= Southern Negev Mountains Natural Region =

Coordinates: 30°02′54″N 35°01′35″E

- Natural Region
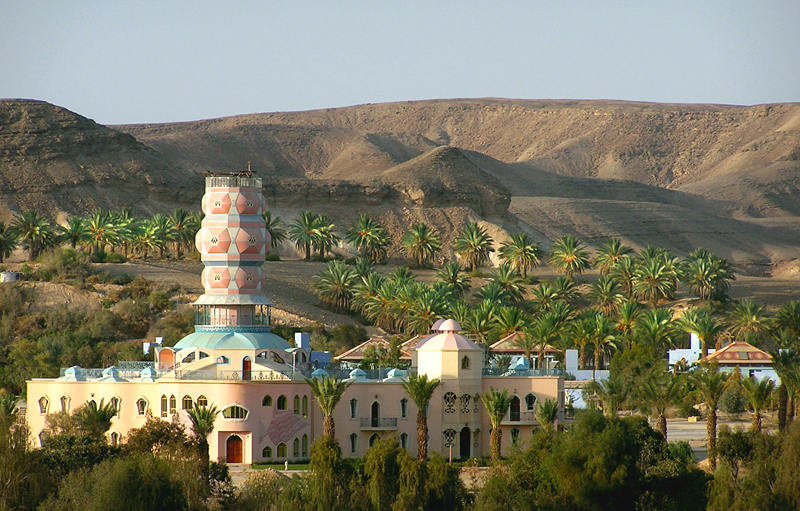
- Neot Smadar, the largest town in the Southern Negev Mountains Natural Region
- Country: Israel
- District: Southern
- Subdistrict: Beersheba
- Largest Town: Neot Smadar

Area
  - Total: 2,937 km^{2} (1,134 sq mi)

Population (2024)
  - Total: 577

Ethnicity
  - Jews and others: 89.4%
  - Arabs: 2.1%

The Southern Negev Mountains Natural Region is a natural region in the Beersheba Subdistrict, in the Southern District of Israel. Neot Smadar is the largest town in the natural region.

== Geography ==
Districts, Subdistricts and Natural Regions of the State of Israel, 2018

The natural region consists of the mountainous southern portion of the Negev Desert in southern Israel, south of Mitzpe Ramon and north of Eilat. It has an area of 2,937 km^{2}, making it the second-largest natural region in Israel. The largest town in the natural region is Neot Smadar, which contains 48 percent of the natural region's population. The natural region contains only three other villages. All localities in the natural region are part of the Hevel Eilot Regional Council.

== Demographics ==
With just 577 residents as of 2024, the Southern Negev Mountains Natural Region is the least populous natural region in Israel. 89 percent of the residents of the Northern Negev Mountains Natural Region are Jewish. There are no Arab towns in the natural region.

Historical population
| Year | Pop. | ±% |
|---|---|---|
| 1983 | 0 | — |
| 1995 | 300 | — |
| 2008 | 410 | +36.7% |
| 2022 | 550 | +34.1% |
| 2024 | 577 | +4.9% |

== Administrative local authorities ==
| Cities | Local Councils | Villages |
|---|---|---|
| [None] | [None] | Hevel Eilot: Neot Smadar; Neve Harif; Shaharut; Shitim |

== Voting Patterns ==
In the 2022 election, 85 percent of voters in the natural region voted for the parties of the center-left coalition led by Yair Lapid, while 8 percent voted for the parties of the right-wing coalition led by Benjamin Netanyahu and 2 percent voted for the Arab parties.

In the 2026 election, 84 percent of voters in the natural region voted for the parties of the center-left coalition led by Gadi Eisenkot, while 10 percent voted for the parties of the right-wing coalition led by Benjamin Netanyahu and 0.8 percent voted for the Arab parties. An additional 4.1 percent voted for the Reservists, and 1.1 percent voted for Amcha Yisrael. Voter turnout increased 15 percent from the 2022 election.
