= Be'er Ora =

Community settlement in southern Israel

Be'er Ora: באר אורה (Hebrew)
- Community settlement
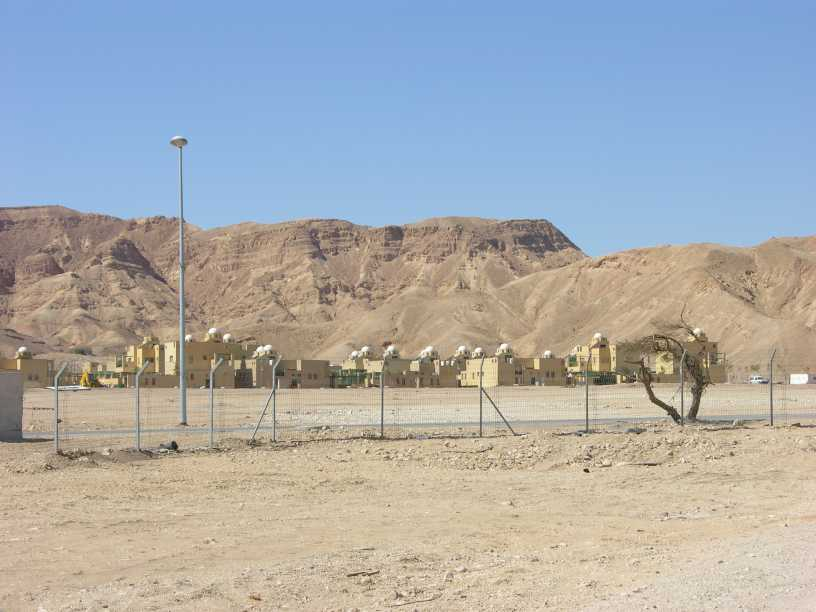
- Etymology: Well of light
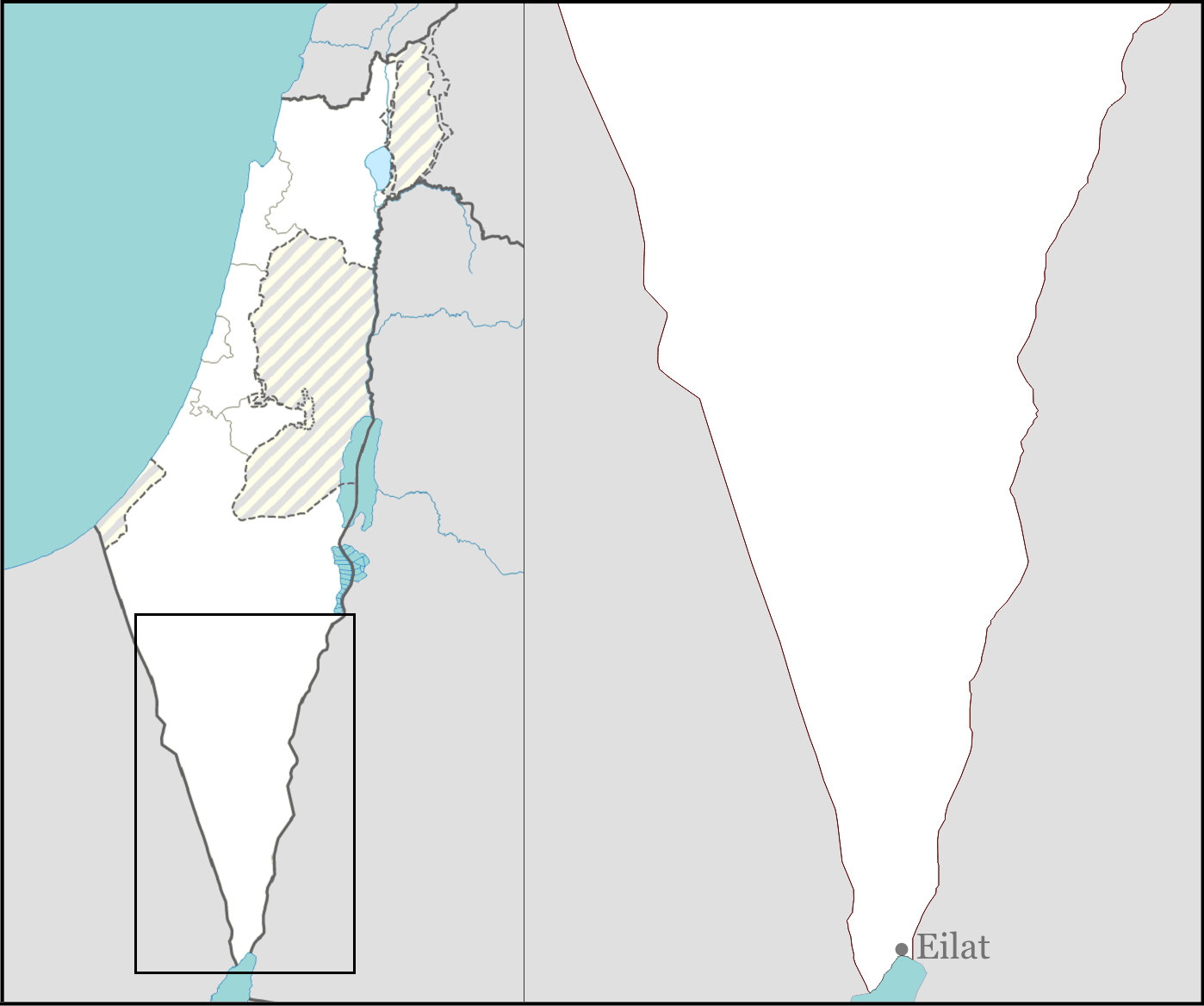
- Location within Southern Negev region of Israel Location within Israel
- Coordinates: 29°42′38″N 34°59′12″E
- Country: Israel
- District: Southern
- Subdistrict: Beersheba
- Council: Hevel Eilot
- Founded: 2001
- Population (2024): 1,378
- Website: www.beerora.org

Be'er Ora (Hebrew: באר אורה, lit. 'Well of light') is a community settlement in the Arava valley, near Eilat, in the far south of Israel. Located in the west of Highway 90, north of kibbutz Eilot, and south of Elifaz and Timna Park, it falls under the jurisdiction of Hevel Eilot Regional Council. In 2024 its population was 1,378.

== Etymology ==
The word Be'er means "well of water". Before the community was established, there was a well within its area that served as the first source of freshwater for Eilat, before Eilat was connected to the national water network. The word Ora (light) is borrowed from the nearby Ora Mountain and Ora Creek.

== History ==
Before the settlement was founded, Be'er Ora was previously the site of an Israeli army base. In 1968, Be'er Ora was the site of the bombing of a school bus carrying Israeli high school students, an incident that led to IDF retaliating against a Palestine Liberation Organization base in neighboring Jordan in the Battle of Karameh.

The current Be'er Ora settlement was founded in 2001 as part of a program to populate the Arava valley and to bring people from central Israel to the Negev desert, which was determined to be a preferred place for new settlement. Previously there was a Gadna army base, also called Be'er Ora, in that location.

In 2004, the government decided to move the activity of Eilat Airport to a then empty area near Be'er Ora. Ramon Airport opened in 2019.
