= Yahel (disambiguation) =

Yahel may refer to:

- Yahel, a kibbutz near Eilat in the far south of Israel
- Yahel Castillo (born 1987), Mexican diver
- Yinon Yahel (born 1978)
- Yahel Sherman, Israelian dj and producer, stagename Yahel
