= Neve Harif =

Kibbutz in southern Israel

Neve Harif: נְוֵה חָרִיף (Hebrew); نفة حريف (Arabic)
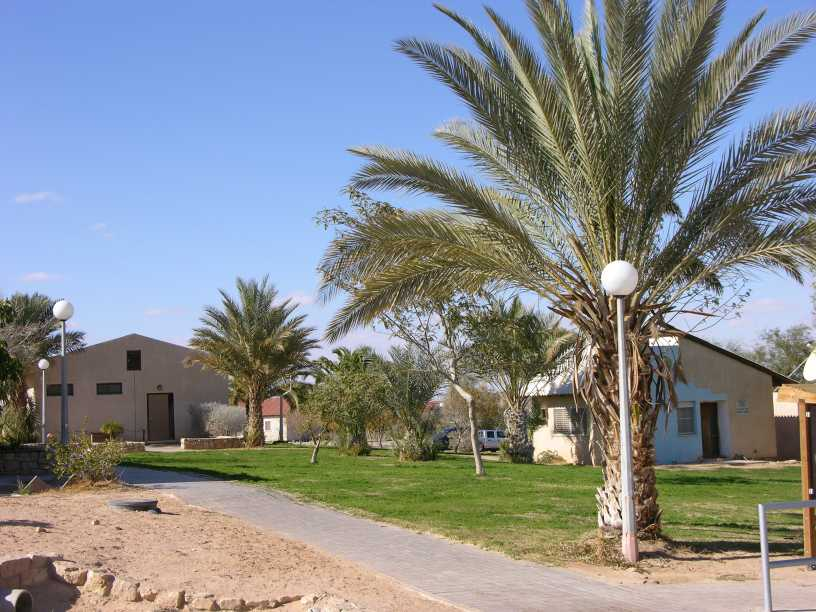

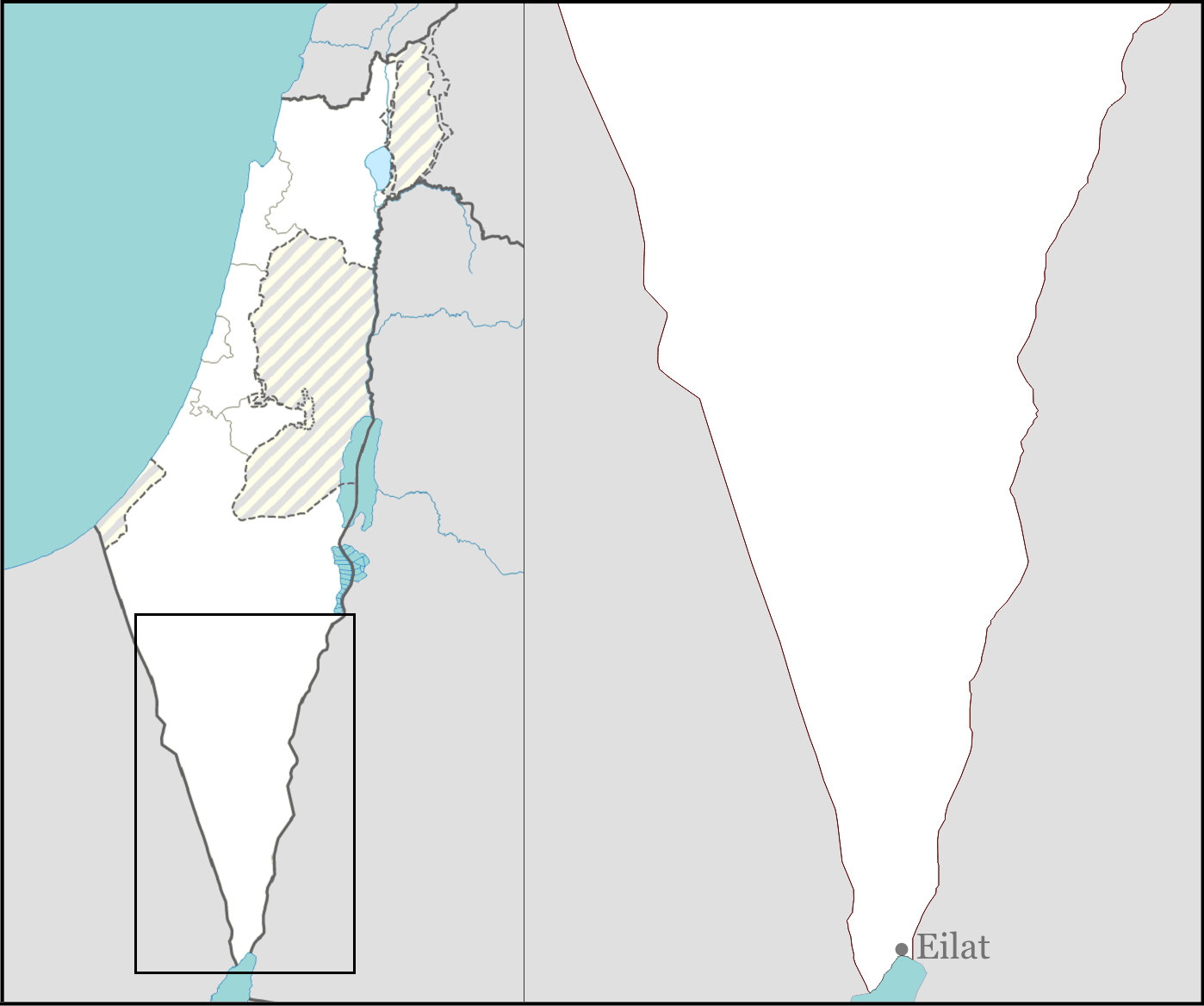
- Location within Southern Negev region of Israel Location within Israel
- Coordinates: 30°2′20″N 35°2′10″E
- Country: Israel
- District: Southern
- Council: Hevel Eilot
- Affiliation: Kibbutz Movement
- Founded: 1983
- Founder: Jewish Urbanites
- Population (2024): 146

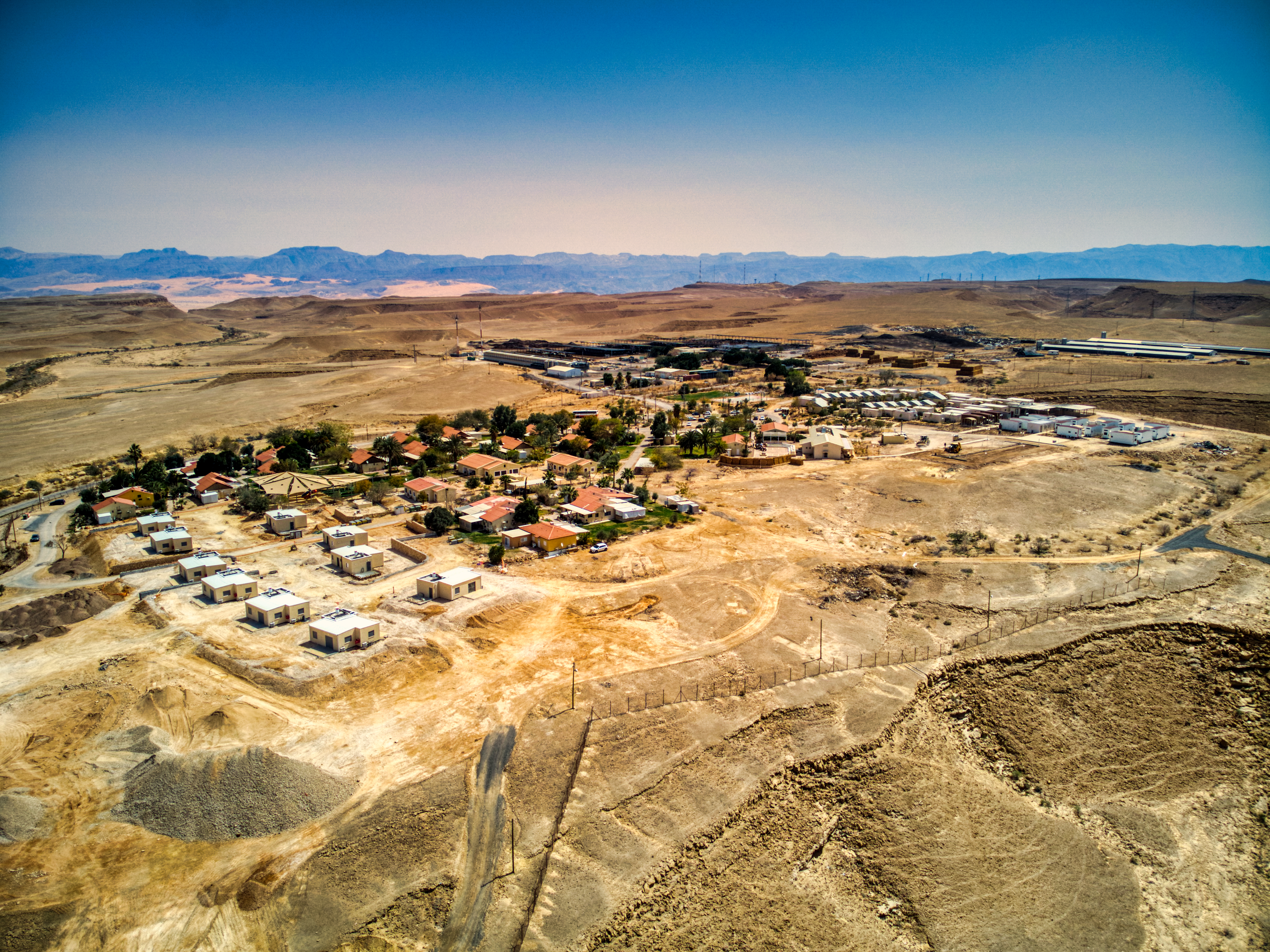
Neve Harif

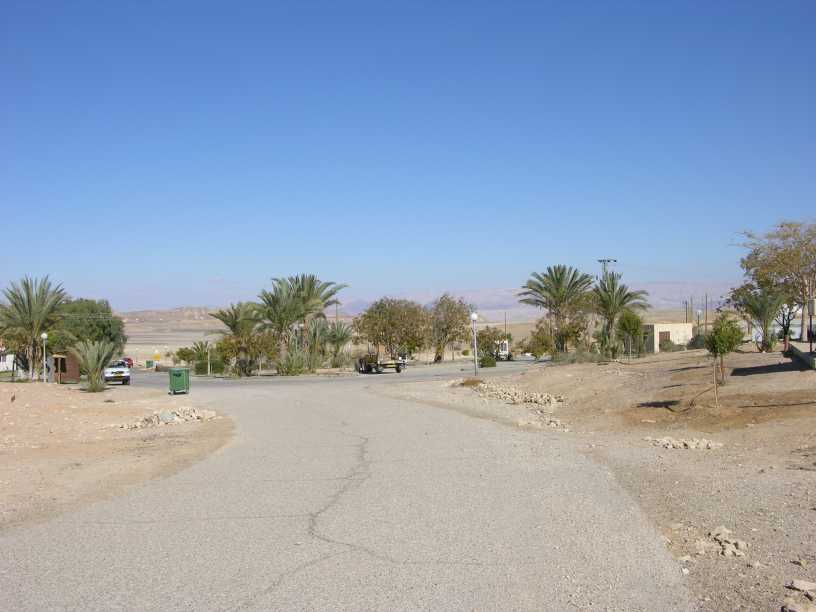

Neve Harif (Hebrew: נְוֵה חָרִיף) is a kibbutz in southern Israel. Located in the Arabah valley near Eilat, it falls under the jurisdiction of Hevel Eilot Regional Council. In 2024 it had a population of 146.

== History ==
The kibbutz was founded in 1983 by city dwellers who wanted to establish a kibbutz that would combine the kibbutz ideology with a modern daily lifestyle. The community was established on a temporary site named Shitim, moving to the current site a year later. The kibbutz was originally named Avida (Hebrew: אבידע) based on its location, but was renamed Neve Harif in honour of Knesset member and kibbutz activist Moshe Harif who was killed in a car crash in 1982.

As of 2023, the population was reported at 135. In older data: in 2008 the population was 127.

According to a 2021 demographic breakdown, the population then was around 108 (with slight fluctuations over years).

Age distribution (2021): majority working-age (15–64), some children (0–14), and a small elderly population (65+).

Ethnic composition: mostly Jewish residents.

Given its small size (around 25–30 families per some older sources) and remote location, Neve Harif is a small, tight-knit kibbutz community.
