= Grofit =

Kibbutz in southern Israel

Grofit: גְּרוֹפִית (Hebrew); جروفيت (Arabic)
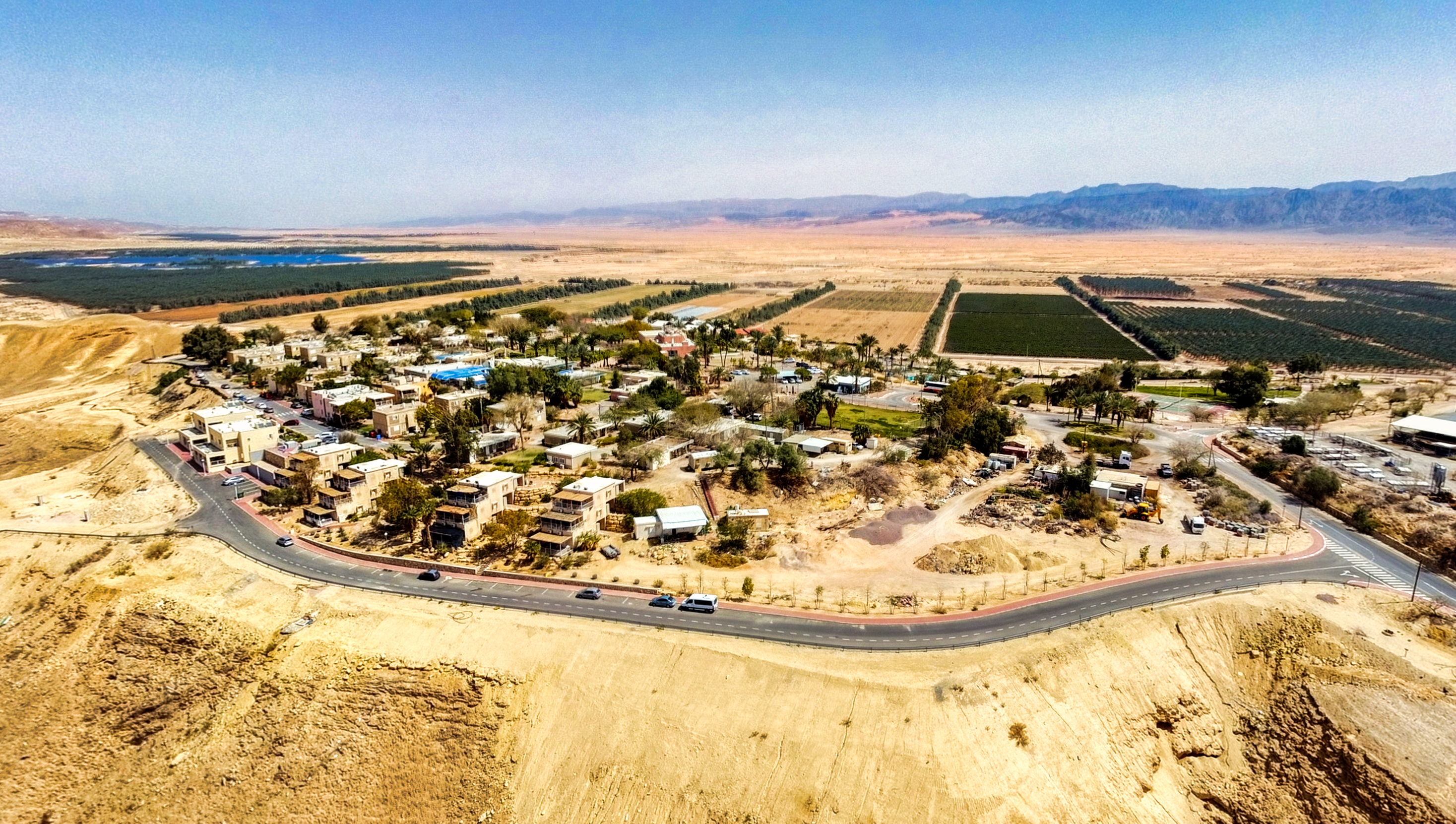
- Etymology: Shoot
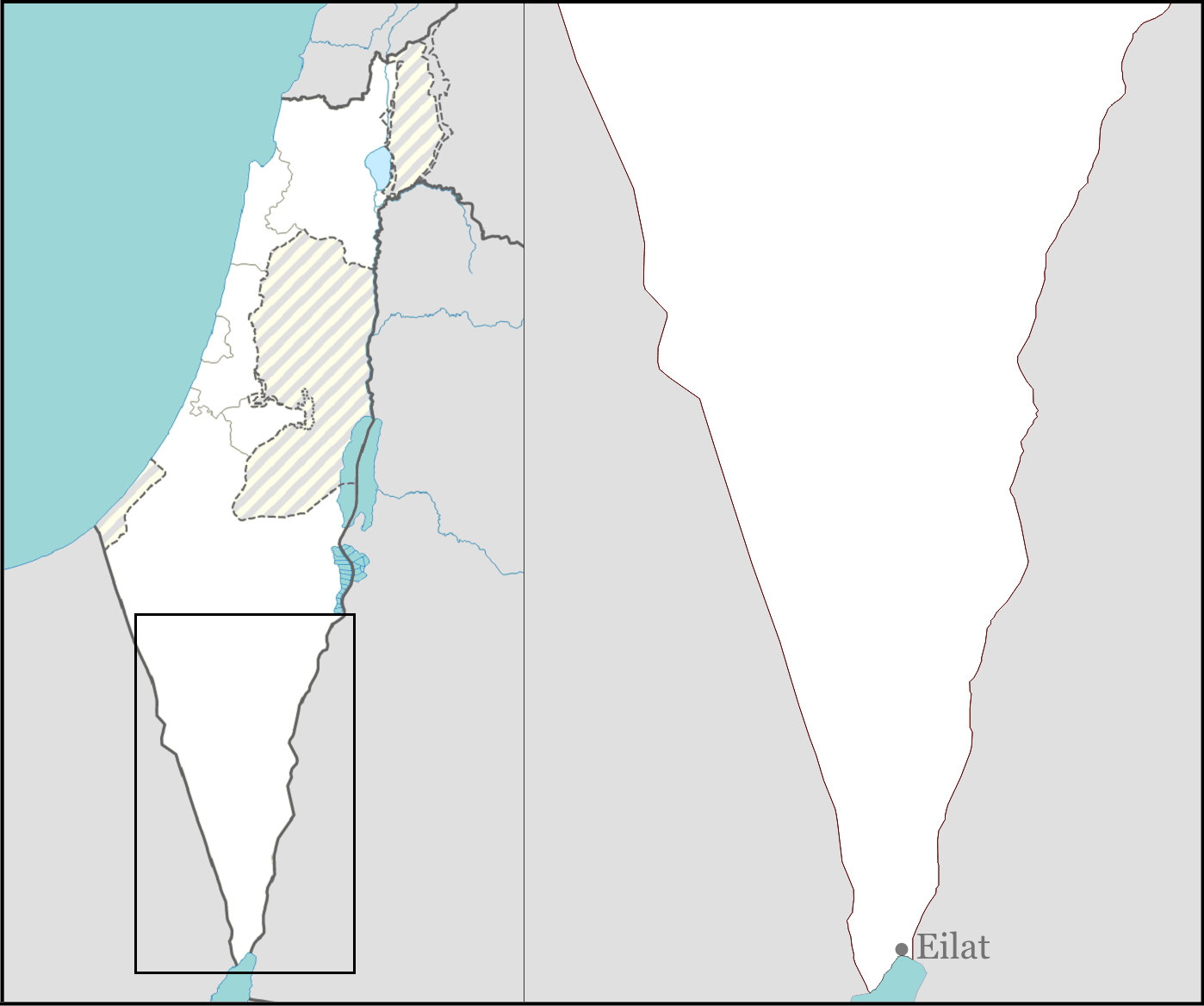
- Location within Southern Negev region of Israel
- Coordinates: 29°56′28″N 35°3′51″E
- Country: Israel
- District: Southern
- Subdistrict: Beersheba
- Council: Hevel Eilot
- Affiliation: Kibbutz Movement
- Founded: 1963
- Founder: Nahal
- Population (2024): 337
- Website: www.grofit.net

Grofit (Hebrew: גְּרוֹפִית, lit. shoot [of a plant]) is a kibbutz in southern Israel. Located near Eilat in the Arabah region, it falls under the jurisdiction of Hevel Eilot Regional Council. In 2024 it had a population of 337.

== History ==
The community was founded in 1963 as a Nahal settlement and is named after the Arabic name of the nearby Grofit Creek. In 1966 the kibbutz was settled by adults who had been members of the HaNoar HaOved VeHaLomed youth movement.

== Notable people ==
- Moshe Ya'alon, Israel's Minister of Defence (2013-2016), IDF Chief of the General Staff (2002-2005)
