= Hevel Eilot Regional Council =

Coordinates: 29.933°N 35.067°E

Hevel Eilot חבל אילות
- Regional council (from 1964)
- Interactive map of Hevel Eilot
- Country: Israel
- District: Southern
- Subdistrict: Beersheba
- Natural region: Arava, Southern Negev Mountains

Government
  - Head of Municipality: Dr. Hanan Ginat

Area
  - Total: 2,649,390 dunams (2,649.39 km^{2}; 1,022.94 sq mi)

Population (2022)
  - Total: 5,300
  - Density: 2.0/km^{2} (5.2/sq mi)
- Website: Official website

Hevel Eilot Regional Council (Hebrew: מועצה אזורית חבל אילות, Mo'atza Azorit Hevel Eilot) is a regional council in the Southern District of Israel, near the city of Eilat. It is the southernmost regional council in Israel.

Only about 5,300 people live in the council in twelve communities. Its area is about 2.2 million dunams (2,200 km^{2}; 850 mi^{2}). The major city of the region, Eilat, governs itself as a city council and is not included in the regional council.

== History ==
Hevel Eilot Regional Council was established in 1964.

In the ceremony participated the General Director of the Ministry of the Interior, the Chairman of the Tamar Regional Council, the Chairman of the Lachish Regional Council and other guests. The area of the regional council was then about two million dunams (2,000 km^{2}; 770 mi^{2}) and was the largest jurisdiction in Israel and had only 250 residents. It then encompassed the localities of Eilot, Yotvata and Grofit.

== Geography ==
The jurisdiction of Hevel Eilot Regional Council is covered by the following borders:

- North: Central Arava Regional Council
- East: Jordan
- South: Eilat
- West: Egypt and the central Negev

Hevel Eilot is a region of arid desert. There is little precipitation in the winter, and summer temperatures rise above 40 °C (104 °F). The flora and fauna are typical for the desert.

Timna Park is a nature reserve that covers a large area in the region.

The region is home to the first commercial solar field in Israel, built by Arava Power Company, located at Kibbutz Ketura.

The region, which is far away from central Israel, is not connected to the national water supply system. Instead, the drinking and irrigation water is derived from desalination of water from the Red Sea.

== Communities in the council ==
There are 13 communities in the council: 10 kibbutzim and three community settlements.

=== Kibbutzim ===
- Eilot (אילות)
- Elifaz (אליפז)
- Grofit (גרופית)
- Ketura (קטורה)
- Lotan (לוטן)
- Neot Smadar (נאות סמדר)
- Neve Harif (נווה חריף)
- Samar (סמר)
- Yotvata (יטבתה)
- Yahel (יהל)

=== Community settlements ===
- Be'er Ora (באר אורה)
- Shaharut (שחרות)
- Shitim (שיטים)

== Demographics ==
Historical population
Year	Pop.	±%
1972	400	—
1983	1,300	+225.0%
1995	2,500	+92.3%
2008	3,010	+20.4%
2022	4,813	+59.9%
2024	5,203	+8.1%

== Voting Patterns ==
In the 2022 election, 82 percent of voters in the regional council voted for the parties of the center-left coalition led by Yair Lapid, while 17 percent voted for the parties of the right-wing coalition led by Benjamin Netanyahu and 1 percent voted for the Arab parties.

In the 2026 election, 80 percent of voters in the regional council voted for the parties of the center-left coalition led by Gadi Eisenkot, while 15 percent voted for the parties of the right-wing coalition led by Benjamin Netanyahu and 0.8 percent voted for the Arab parties. An additional 2.9 percent voted for the Reservists, and 1 percent voted for Amcha Yisrael. Voter turnout increased 15 percent from the 2022 election.
