= Shaharut =

Community settlement in southern Israel

Shaharut: שחרות (Hebrew)
- Community settlement
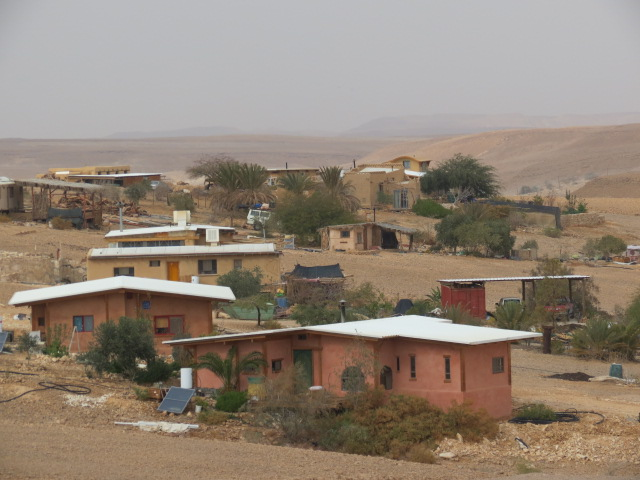
- View of Shaharut

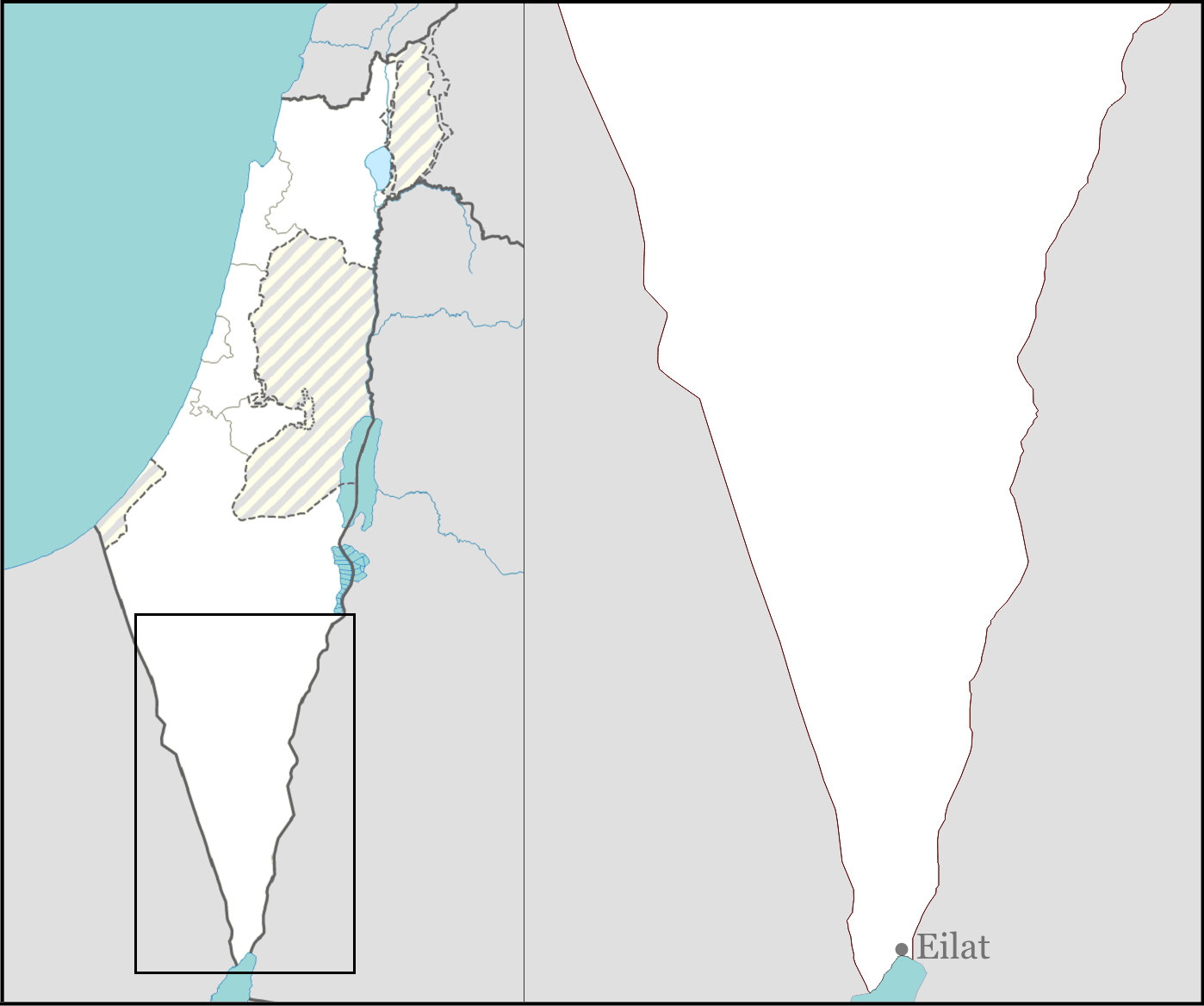
- Location within Southern Negev region of Israel Location within Israel
- Coordinates: 29°54′17″N 34°59′59″E
- Country: Israel
- District: Southern
- Subdistrict: Beersheba
- Council: Hevel Eilot
- Affiliation: HaMerkaz HaHakla'i
- Founded: 1985; 41 years ago
- Founder: Jewish Agency
- Population (2024): 157

Shaharut (Hebrew: שחרות) is a community settlement in the far south of Israel. Located 40 kilometers north of the city of Eilat, and six kilometers west of Yotvata on a ridge above the Arava valley, it falls under the jurisdiction of Hevel Eilot Regional Council. In 2024 it had a population of 157.

== History ==
Shaharut was founded in 1985 by the Jewish Agency and was named after the nearby Mount Shaharut; the word "Shaharut" means "youth", as in Ecclesiastes chapter 11. It is the only settlement in the area that is not in the valley.

== Notable residents ==
- A-WA, musical band
- Anna RF, musical band
