= Yotvata =

Kibbutz in southern Israel

Yotvata: יָטְבָתָה (Hebrew); يوتفاتا (Arabic)
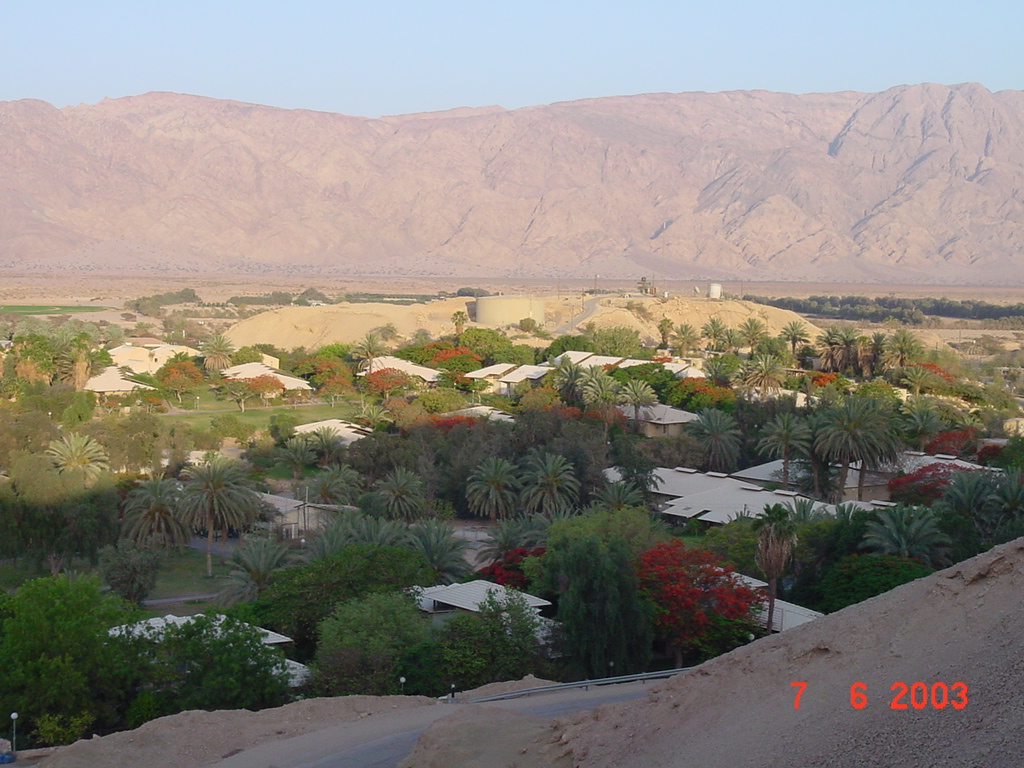
- Yotvata (Edom Mountains in the background).

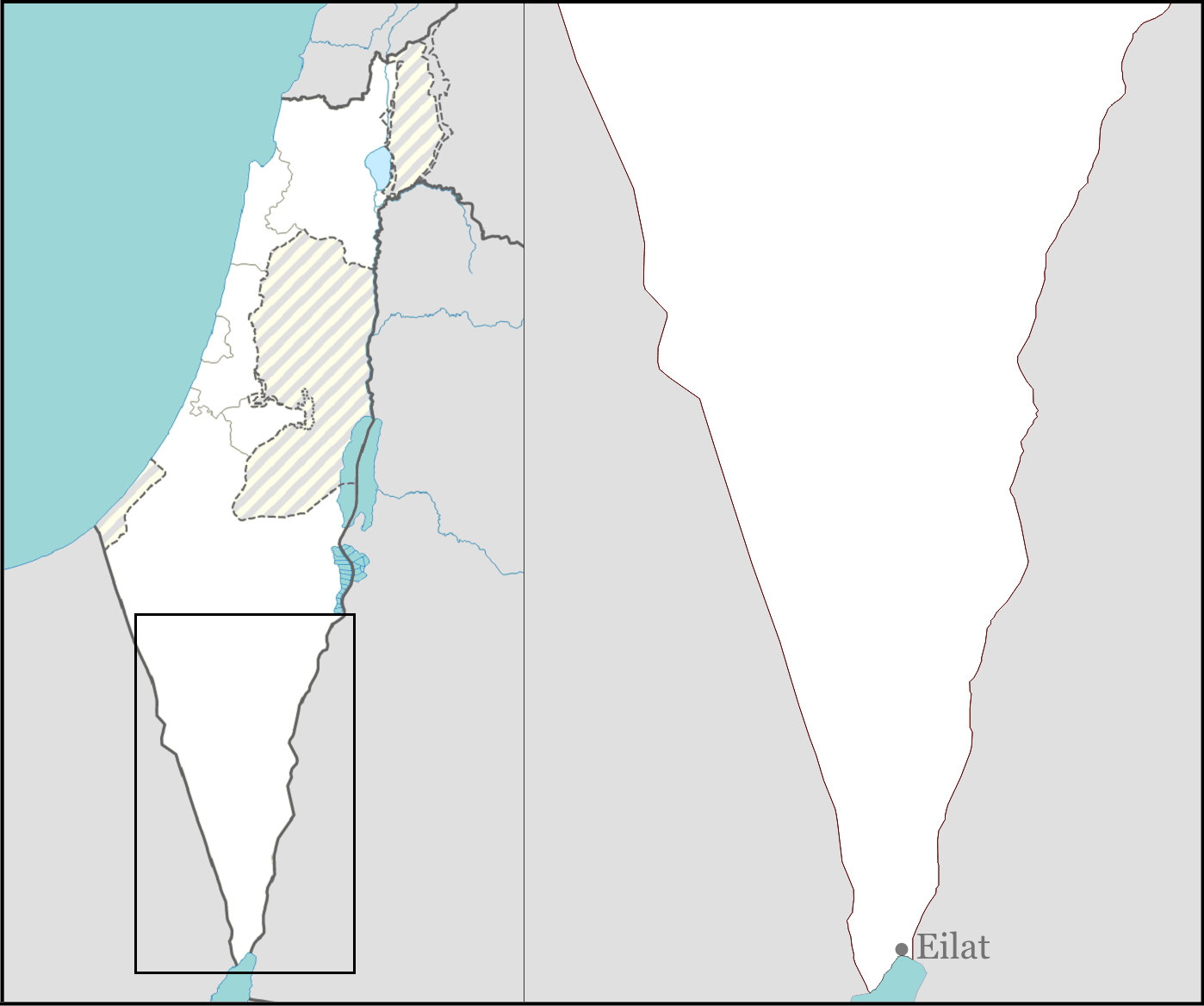
- Location within Southern Negev region of Israel Location within Israel
- Coordinates: 29°53′44″N 35°3′36″E
- Country: Israel
- District: Southern
- Subdistrict: Beersheba
- Council: Hevel Eilot
- Affiliation: Kibbutz Movement
- Founded: 1951
- Founder: Ihud HaKvutzot VeHaKibbutzim Members
- Population (2024): 824
- Website: www.yotvata.org.il

"Yotvat" is also the Hebrew name for Tiran Island.

Yotvata (Hebrew: יָטְבָתָה yotváta (but commonly pronounced yotvetá), Arabic: يوتفاتا) is a kibbutz in the Arava Valley in southern Israel. Located on the Highway 90's segment known as the Arava Road, adjacent to the southern Negev, it falls under the jurisdiction of Hevel Eilot Regional Council. In 2024, it had a population of 824.

The Arava Valley is an arid desert where the average annual rainfall is less than 30 mm and temperatures often exceed 40 °C (104 °F) in summer and 21 °C (70 °F) in winter.

== Location ==
Located approximately 40 km north of the Red Sea, Yotvata is most prosperous Kibbutz in Hevel Eilot Regional Council. Being relatively far from major urban centers (41 kilometers north of Eilat and 130 kilometers south of Dimona), it is the center of the region, where most regional facilities are based, including a regional school, regional council offices, community center, sports center, movies and concert hall, and local airfield.

== History ==
=== Establishment ===
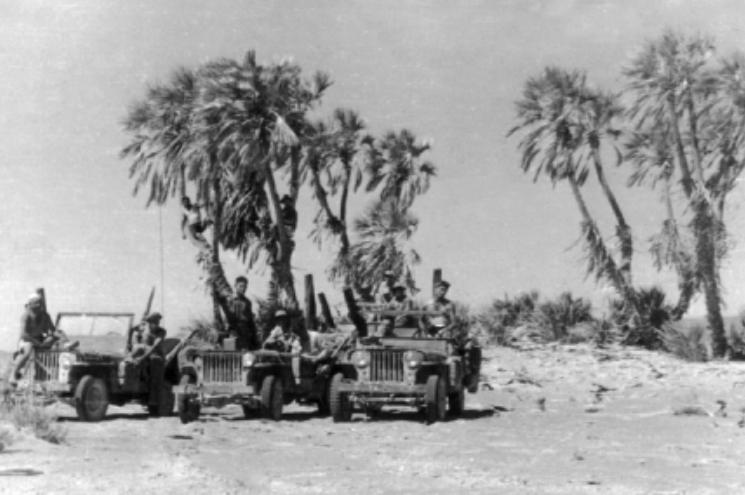
Ein Radian/Yotvata 1948

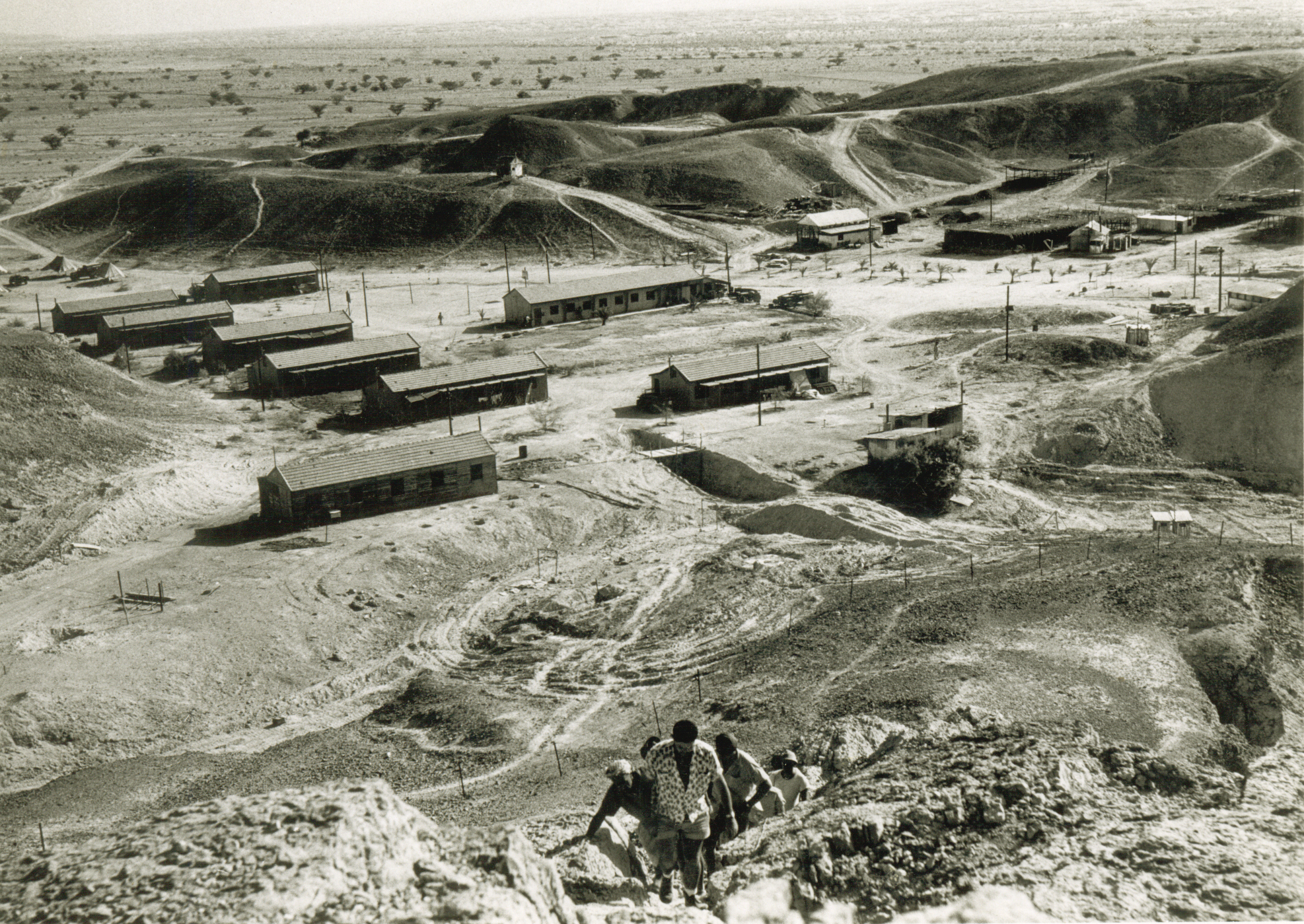
Ein Radian Nahal Settlement

Yotvata was formed in 1951 as a Nahal settlement named Ein Radian. In 1957, it became the first kibbutz in the southern Arava region, affiliated Ihud HaKvutzot VeHaKibbutzim. The kibbutz was named for an Israelite encampment mentioned in Numbers 33:34 and Deuteronomy 10:7: "…from there they went to Gudgodah, and then to Jotbatha, a land of streaming water". Some say that biblical Yotvata was closer to the Red Sea near Taba.

The founders were a small group of men and women after military service. The challenges were many: the burning sun, heat, shortage of water, infertile land, distance from other settled areas and no solid source of income. They experimented with different crops, such as grapes, pomegranates and vegetables. They also tried to raise cattle and chickens but with little success. A date plantation proved more suitable to the arid conditions.

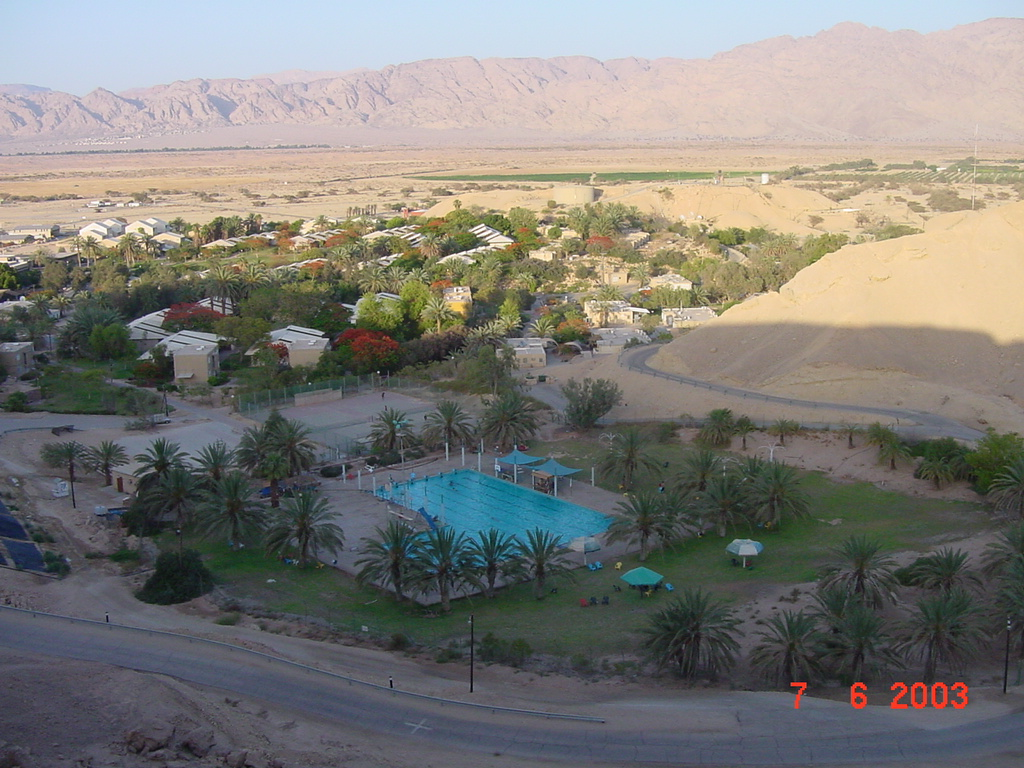
Yotvata - 2003

At that point, they decided to found a dairy that would provide milk to Eilat although breeding milking cows in the desert was considered an impossible mission. In 1962 the dairy was founded, with four cows. The person who came up with the idea was Ori Horazo (1939–1966). The Jewish Agency refused to finance the project but the Israeli Trade and Industry Minister, Pinhas Sapir agreed. In its first year, the dairy produced 500,000 liters of milk. By 2008, it was producing 62 million liters a year and controlled 63% of the Israeli dairy-beverage market (making NIS 400 million a year), and 49% of the fortified milk market (making NIS 250 million a year). It employed 130 workers and had 700 cows. The dairies of Kibbutz Yahel, Lotan, and Ketura provide milk for Yotvata.

In 1960, the first children of the community were born, and six years later the school opened with three first graders; today there are 200 kids in the kibbutz, and 600 students from all of the region communities attend the Maale Shaharut School in Yotvata from 1st grade until 12th grade.

=== Archaeology ===
Judging by the numerous historic forts surrounding, Yotvata's location was a strategic one:

- Southwest of the kibbutz lies a Roman fortress built during the reign of the Emperor Diocletian (dated c. 300 AD) as part of a line of border fortresses (the Limes Arabicus) in the Negev, in order to protect the trade route from marauding Arab nomads.
- East of the kibbutz lies an ancient Arab resting fortress with towers in its corners, dating from the Nabataeans era (c. 700 AD) and served as a resting station for the convoys crossing the desert.
- On a hill west of the kibbutz (50 m) is an ancient fort dating from the Iron Age (c. 12th century BCE). The fort overlooks the wellspring, and is considered to have served the Egyptian copper miners.
- East of the kibbutz to the north and to the south there is a wells-chain (known as Fugaras) connected with a tunnel that leads the aquifer water to the surface. Fugaras is an ancient but sophisticated irrigation system.
- North of the kibbutz are two ancient leopard traps. Leopards are known to have inhabited this area.

== Economy and community ==
Yotvata is a cooperative community, where most adult residents work on the kibbutz in production, services or education. The revenues are equally distributed among the members regardless of their position, along the idea of each one gives as much as he can and gets as much as he needs. Most of daily affairs are conducted communally: education, holidays, dining (three meals a day conducted in the commune dining room give the community more relaxed time to spend together) and more.

Yotvata Dairy is a milk products factory which provides the kibbutz with its main source of income and occupies the highest number of members.

Agriculture ranks second in terms of income. Agriculture branches are irrigated land (onions, potatoes, corn, animal feed, garlic and pumpkins), plantations (dates and mangos) and a big and modern dairy farm.

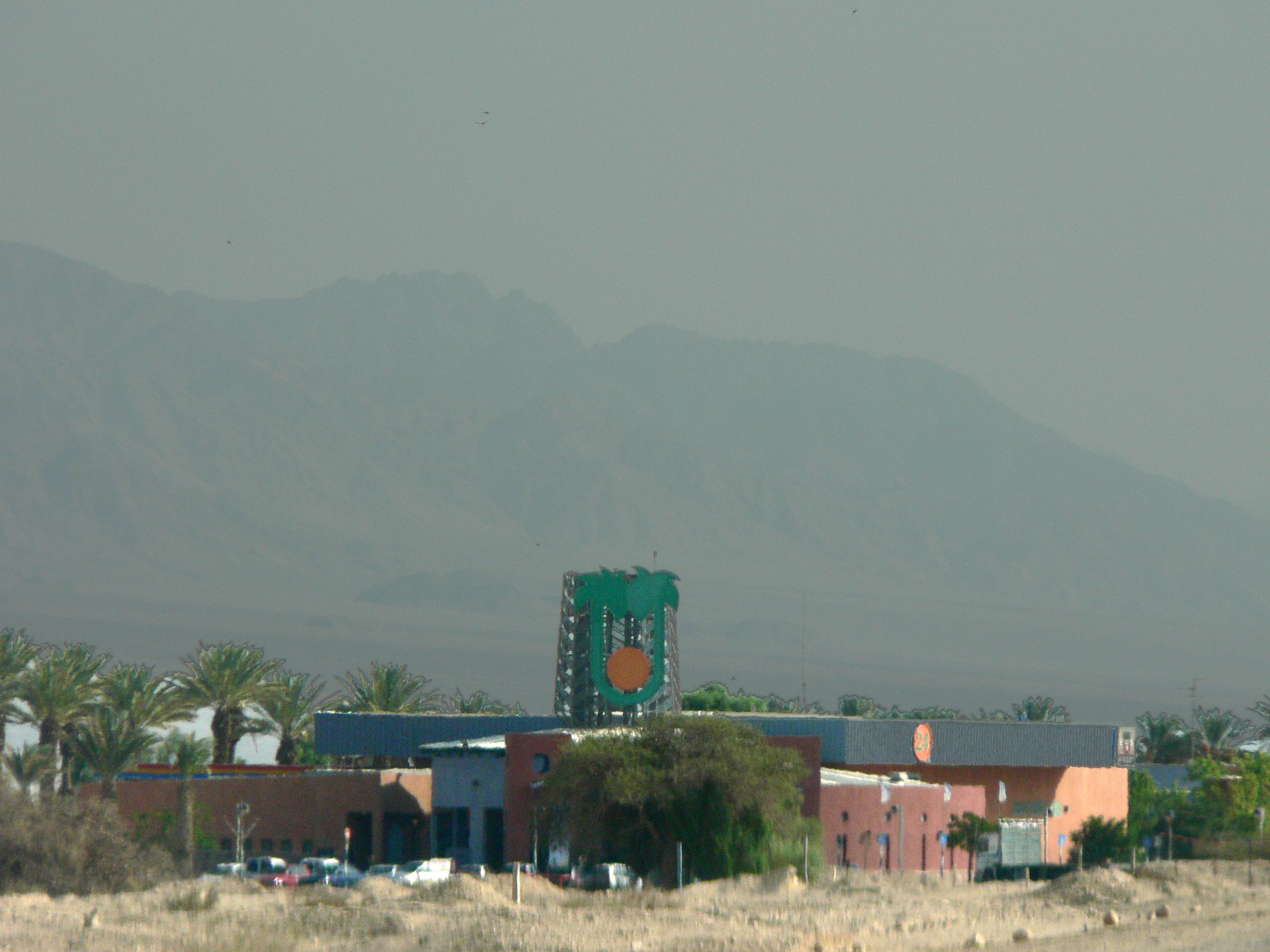
Yotvata's road stop

There is a large road station with restaurant, local ice cream and souvenir shop on the Arava Road.

Other small branches are a picturesque horse stable that lies in the date plantation east to the kibbutz and a few artistic studios.

All members take turns contributing to the kibbutz service branches: kitchen, dining room, laundry, and security. The kibbutz gets all its drinking and irrigation water from aquifer wells in the Arava Valley.

== Attractions ==
Yotvata Hai-Bar Nature Reserve is dedicated to reintroducing extinct species mentioned in the Bible, as well as other endangered desert animals, to the wild. It has three parts: a park for herbivorous animals; a Predators Center that displays reptiles, small desert animals and large predators; and the Desert Night Life Exhibition Hall to observe nocturnal animals during their active hours.

15 km south of Yotvata lies Timna valley, where the sandstone and calcareous rock formations present some breathtaking desert features such as the Solomon's Pillars, Arches and a Mushroom. Timna is also known for its ancient copper mines.

The area provides many great desert walks including canyons, roman routes, sand dunes, fossil hunting, rock-climbing and more.
