= A-WA =

Israeli musical trio

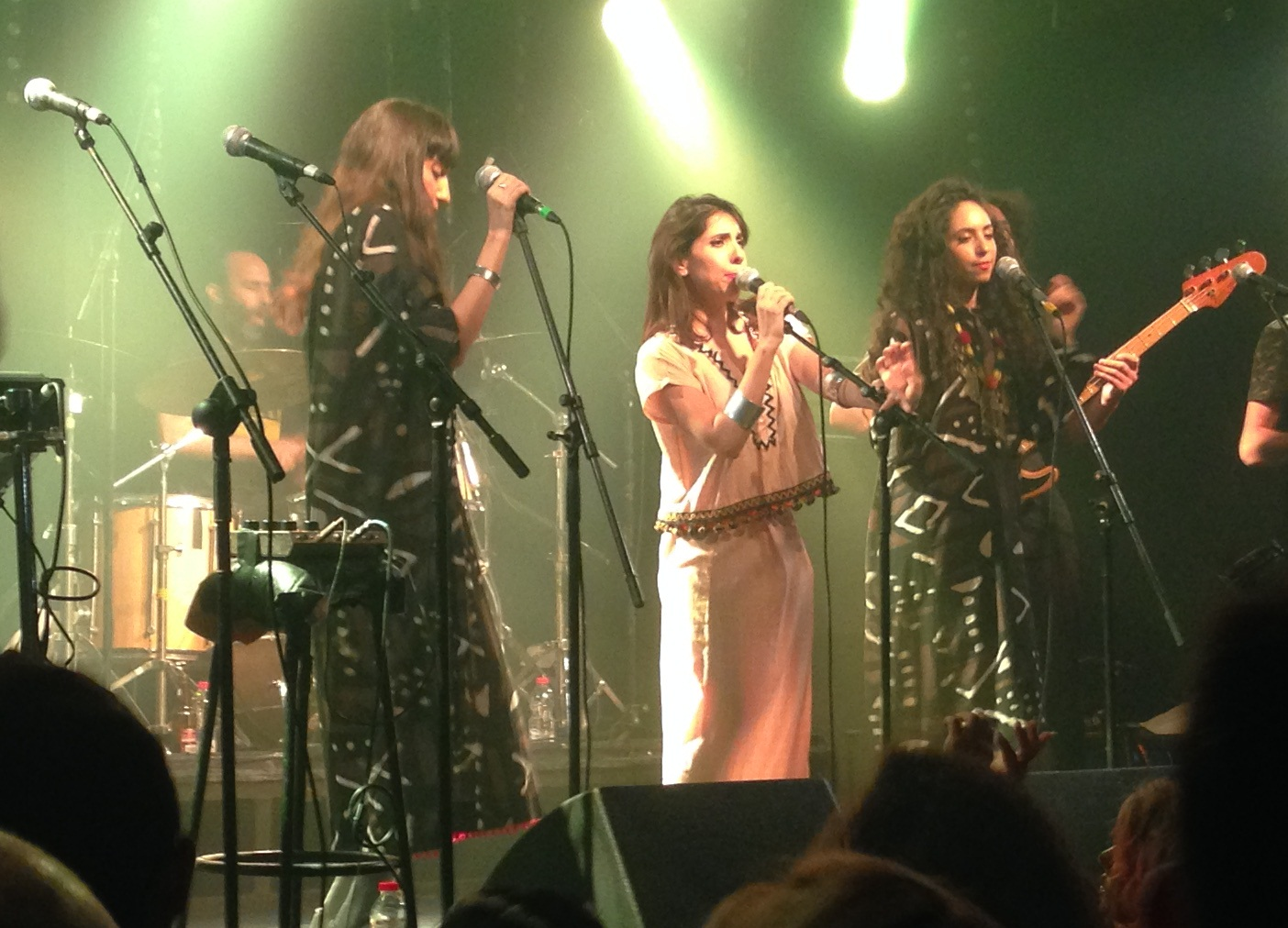
- A-WA performing in 2015

Background information
- Origin: Shaharut, Israel
- Genres: Yemenite; Mizrahi; World; Ethnic electronica; Hip hop
- Years active: 2015-
- Labels: Tôt ou tard; BMG
- Members: Liron Haim; Tagel Haim; Tair Haim
- Website: a-wamusic.com

A-WA (pronounced [ˈeːwa], Arabic for Yes) is an Israeli band made up of the three sisters Tair, Liron, and Tagel Haim. Their single "Habib Galbi" (Love of My Heart) became a global hit, with its Yemenite traditional music mixed with hip hop and electronic music.

== Personal lives ==
The Haim sisters grew up in the community settlement of Shaharut, a village of about thirty families in the Arava Valley desert of southern Israel, to a father of Yemenite Jewish origin and a mother of mixed Ukrainian and Moroccan Jewish heritage. Their paternal grandparents are originally from Sana'a and were brought to Israel during Operation Magic Carpet.

The Haim sisters spent most of their holidays with their paternal grandparents, singing piyyutim, traditional liturgical poems in Hebrew and Aramaic, as well as traditional Yemenite songs in Arabic sung by women. Their parents also played a variety of music genres in their house, with their father playing guitar, bouzouki, and darbuka. At school, the sister took voice, piano, theater, and dance lessons.

Tair has a BA in music from Levinsky College of Education in Tel Aviv, while Liron is an architect, and Tagel is a graphic designer and illustrator. They also have two younger sisters, Shir and Tzlil, and a brother, Evyatar, who is a sound technician and was involved in the production of the album Habib Galbi.

== Musical career ==
A-WA first formed in 2011, after the trio finished college, and they began uploading music to YouTube.

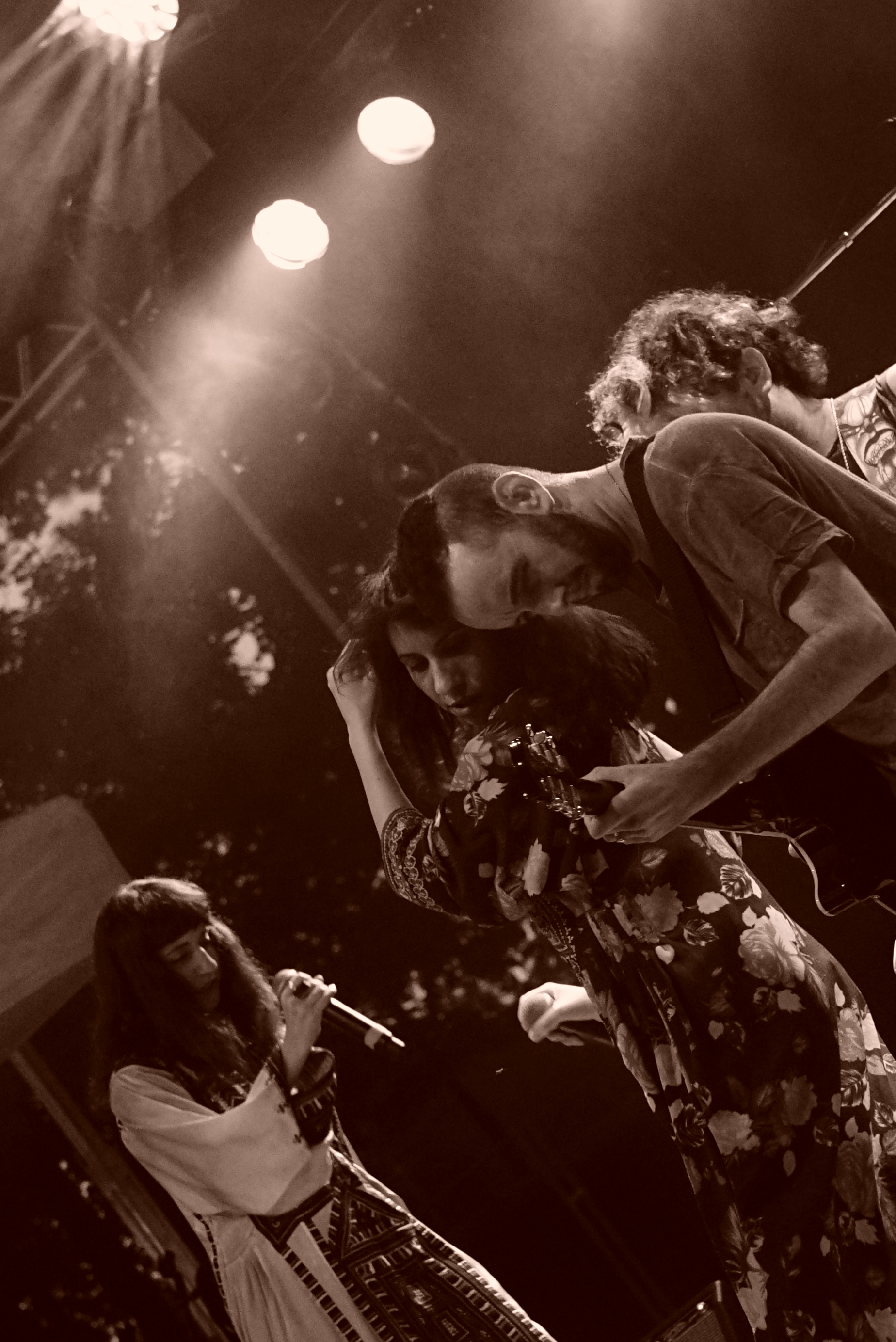
A-WA in 2016

The trio was discovered by Tomer Yosef, the lead singer of Balkan Beat Box, to whom they sent a demo of "Habib Galbi", a traditional Yemenite melody sung in the Yemenite dialect of Judeo-Arabic. He showed the demo to a few elder Yemenite women, who mistook the sisters for actual singers from Yemen. The music video, released in early March, went viral in the Muslim world, especially in Yemen. The three officially released the single in April 2015, and it became the first song in Arabic to hit number 1 on the Israeli pop charts. They toured in Europe after the single's release. The trio debuted the other songs from their debut album during performances in September 2015. The record itself was released in 2016.

A-WA's second studio album, Bayti Fi Rasi, was released in 2019. It is inspired by their great-grandmother Rachel's experiences when immigrating to Israel from Yemen as a single mother and subsequent life in a transition camp. The trio directed a music video for one of the album's songs, "Hana Mash Hu Al Yaman". That same year, the group was invited to perform at the torch-lighting ceremony on Israel's independence day. In September 2019, A-WA was invited to play a Tiny Desk Concert at NPR's headquarters in Washington, D.C. Throughout the end of the year, they toured in Europe and the United States.

In early 2020, Tair released a solo single, titled "Mitbashelet Leat".

== Musical style ==
During their childhood, the three sisters listened to many different kinds of music, including Greek, jazz, R&B, hip hop, reggae, and progressive rock, but their major source of inspiration has been the traditional Yemenite songs heard at their paternal grandparents' home. Their music follows the same trend as did Ofra Haza, their main inspiration, decades ago, mixing in this case traditional Yemenite folk music with electronic tunes, reggae, and hip hop, which they call "yemenite folk n' beat".

The trio also cites psychedelic rock, including Deep Purple and Pink Floyd, as influential in their music.

== Discography ==
- Habib Galbi (2016)
- Bayti Fi Rasi (2019)

== See also ==
- Music of Israel
