= Judeo-Yemeni Arabic =

Judeo-Arabic variety of Yemen

- Yemenite Judeo-Arabic
- Native to: Israel, Yemen
- Ethnicity: Yemenite Jews
- Native speakers: 38,000 (2010–2018)
- Language family: Afro-Asiatic: Semitic; Central Semitic; Arabic languages; Peninsular; Yemeni Arabic; Judeo-Yemeni Arabic
- Writing system: Hebrew alphabet

Language codes
- ISO 639-3: jye
- Glottolog: jude1267
- ELP: Judeo-Yemeni Arabic

Judeo-Yemeni Arabic (also known as Judeo-Yemeni and Yemenite Judeo-Arabic) is a variety of Arabic spoken by Jews from Yemen. The language is written in the Hebrew alphabet. The cities of Sana'a, Aden, al-Bayda, and Habban District and the villages in their districts each have their own dialect.

The vast majority of Yemenite Jews have relocated to Israel and have shifted to Hebrew as their first language. In 1995, Israel was home to 50,000 speakers of Judeo-Yemeni. It is rarely spoken by the younger generation of Yemenite Jewish Israelis, but is used in artistic performances, for example by the musical group A-WA.

In 1995, 1,000 Jews remained in Yemen, and according to Yemeni rabbi al-Marhabi, most of them have since left for the United States. In 2010, fewer than 300 Jews were believed to remain in Yemen. As of 2022, only one Jew is believed to remain in Yemen.

== See also ==
- Judeo-Arabic languages
