= Eilot =

Kibbutz in southern Israel

Eilot: אֵילוֹת (Hebrew)

Hebrew transcription(s)
  - Official: Elot
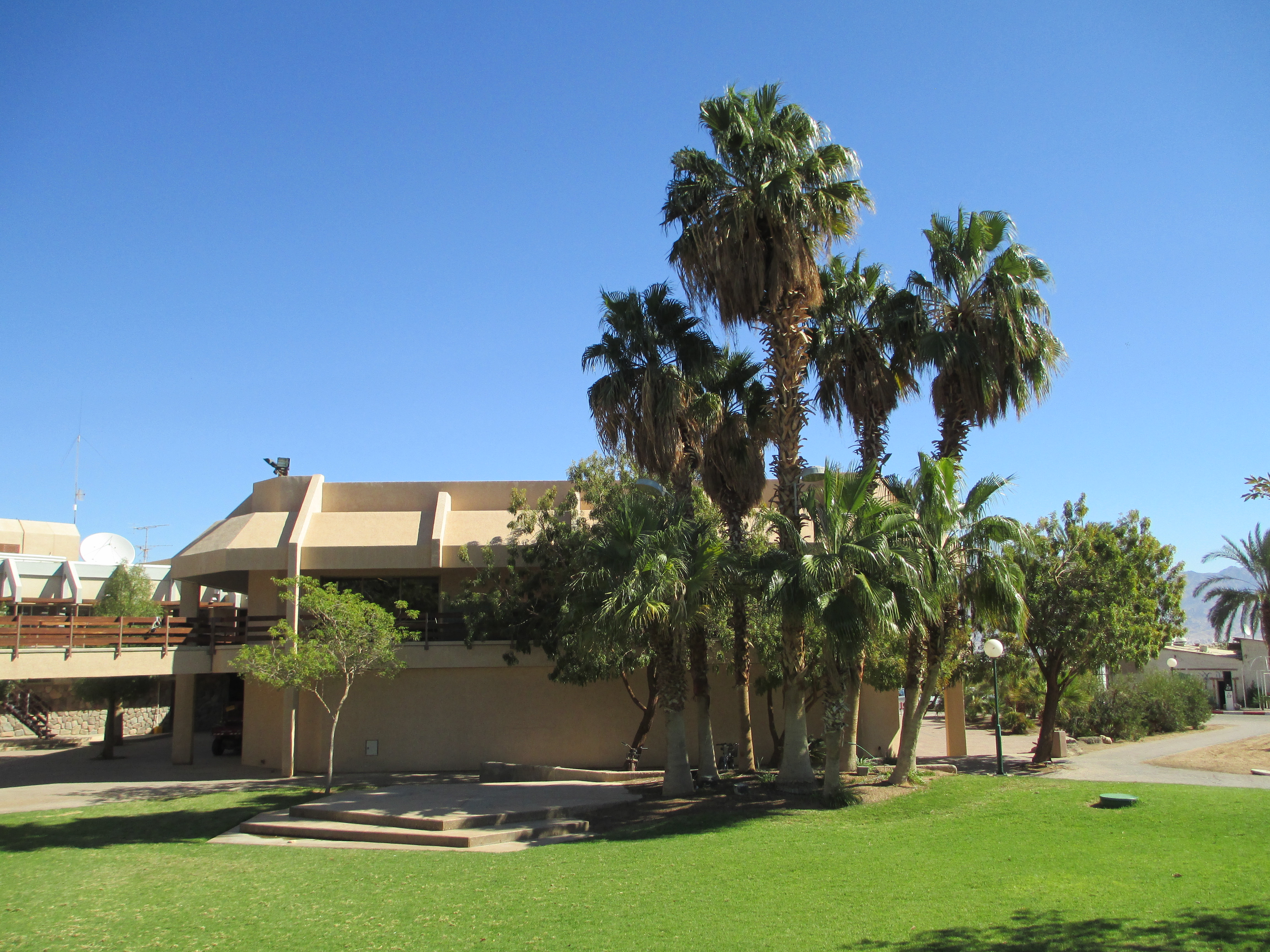
- Dining room at kibbutz Eilot

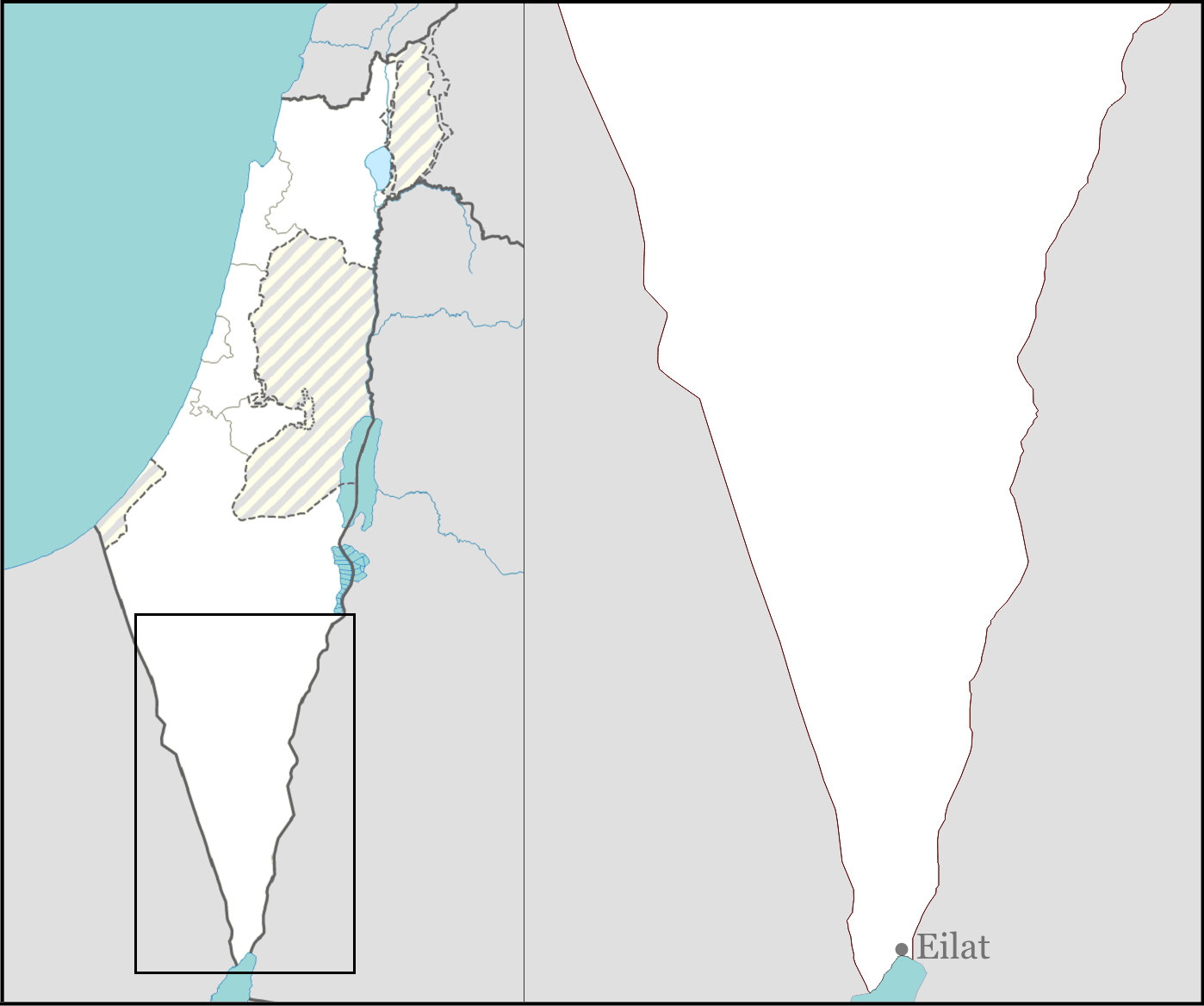
- Location within Southern Negev region of Israel
- Coordinates: 29°34′53″N 34°57′47″E
- Country: Israel
- District: Southern
- Subdistrict: Beersheba
- Council: Hevel Eilot
- Affiliation: Kibbutz Movement
- Founded: 1962
- Founder: Eilat residents
- Population (2024): 419
- Website: www.eilot-tourism.co.il

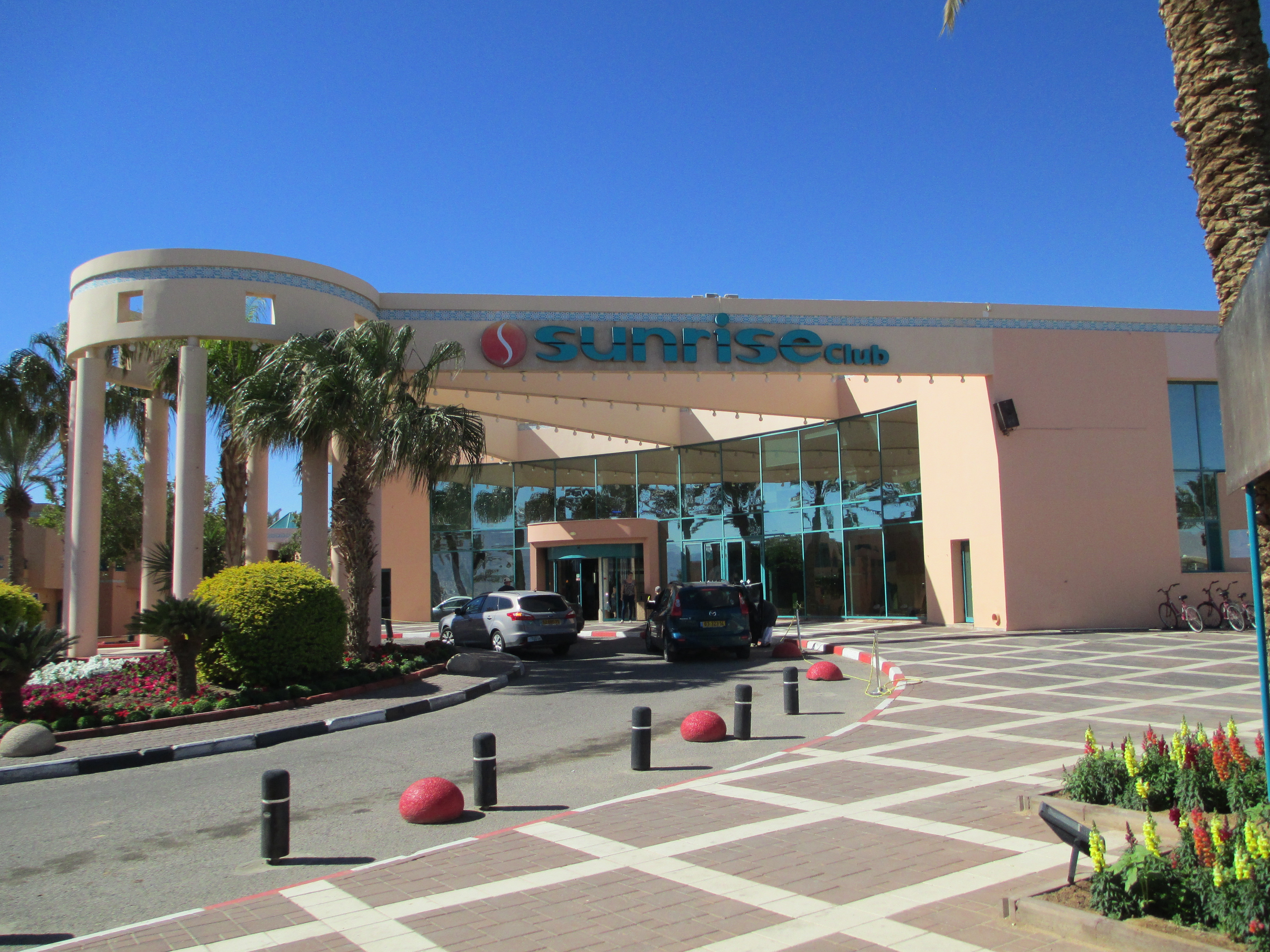
Sunrise Club Hotel in Eilot

Eilot (Hebrew: אֵילוֹת) is the southernmost kibbutz in Israel. It is located in the Aravah Valley, near the border with Jordan. Eilot is less than a kilometer north of Eilat, and just over 3 kilometers north of the Red Sea. It falls under the jurisdiction of Hevel Eilot Regional Council. In 2024 it had a population of 419.

It is noted for its date orchard, though vegetables, other fruits, fishing and tourism are major industries.

== Etymology ==
The origin of the name of the settlement is in the biblical city of Eilat, near Ezion-Geber, also called "Eilot". It was also mentioned in the Books of Kings: "And King Solomon made a navy of ships in Ezion-Geber, which is beside Eloth, on the shore of the Red Sea, in the land of Edom." (1 Kings 9:26).

The Eloth mentioned in the verse is likely close to the present-day location of Kibbutz Eilot.

In July 14, 1962, it was agreed by a majority of votes to determine the new name for the kibbutz.

== History ==
Kibbutz Eilot was begun by a group of 15 young people who descended to Eilat on June 16, 1955, on the advice of Yitzhak Tabenkin, who believed that kibbutzim should be established throughout Israel. The descent to Eilat was contrary to the views held by the government and the Jewish Agency at that time. The members settled in the three huts of Umm Rashresh, on the shore of the Red Sea, and engaged in agriculture in preparation for the establishment of a permanent settlement.

In 1959, it was decided to establish the permanent location of the kibbutz in Nahal Roded, on the site of a former Arab village and where fertile lands were found. It began with the construction of buildings and members of the kibbutz moved to the site at the end of 1962.

The official Aliyah ceremony took place in December 1962, the kibbutz then numbering 60 people, half of whom were members of the kibbutz and the other half reinforcements sent by the United Kibbutz Movement. They were allocated 700 dunams for agricultural cultivation, of which 300 dunams began to grow dates, vegetables and fruits. There was also an industrial laundry which served the Eilat hotels, ships docked at the port of Eilat and nearby Kibbutz Yotvata. The kibbutz also had a commercial fishing operation for a time, and set up a dairy farm and chicken runs. They also established a factory for the production of transformers.

Today tourism is also a major industry.
