= Elifaz, Israel =

Kibbutz in southern Israel

Elifaz: אליפז (Hebrew)
- Kibbutz
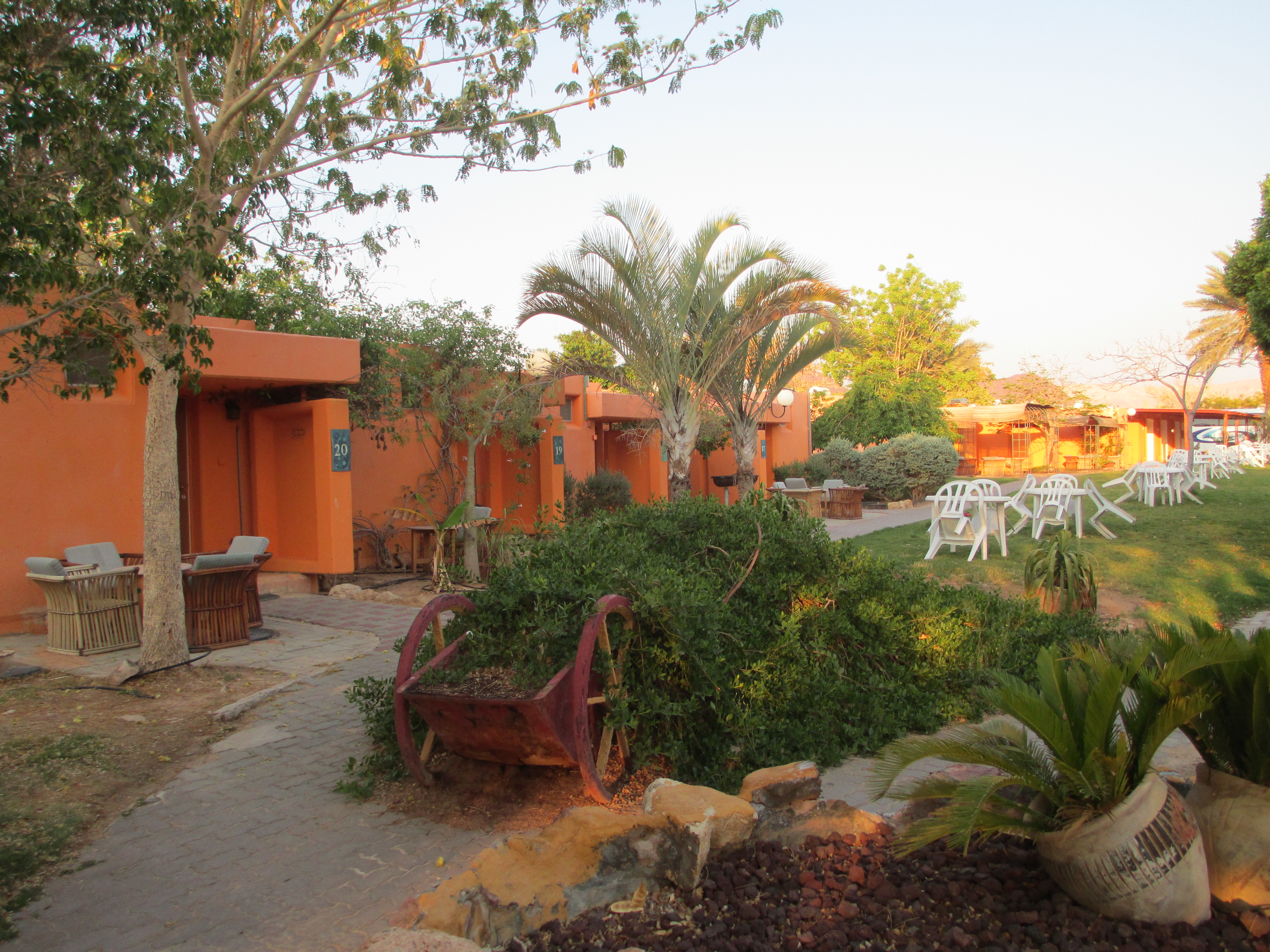

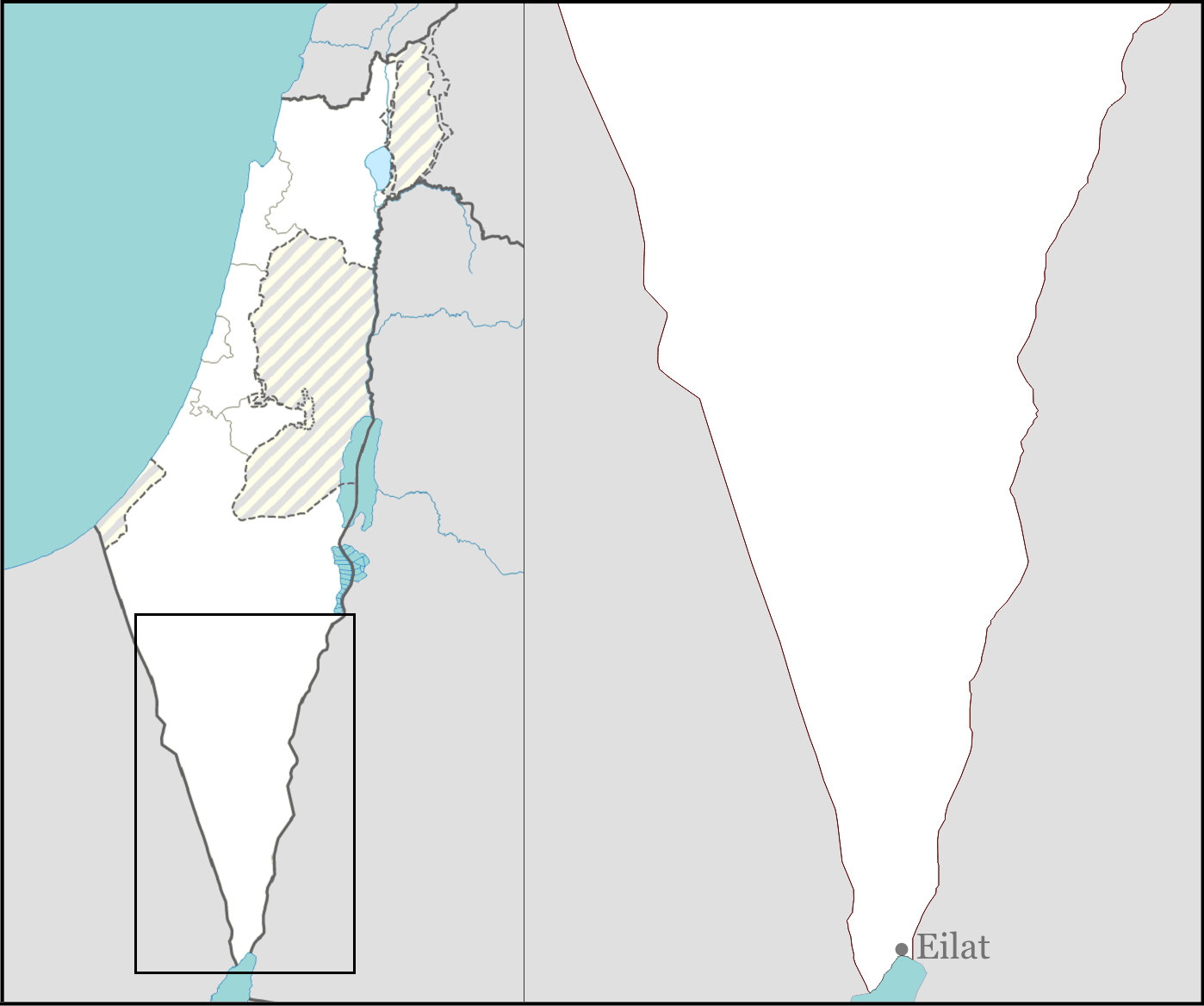
- Location within Southern Negev region of Israel Location within Israel
- Coordinates: 29°47′50″N 35°0′41″E
- Country: Israel
- District: Southern
- Subdistrict: Beersheba
- Council: Hevel Eilot
- Affiliation: Kibbutz Movement
- Founded: 1983; 43 years ago
- Founder: Nahal
- Population (2024): 207
- Website: elifaz.co.il

Elifaz (Hebrew: אליפז) is a kibbutz in the Arava valley, near Eilat, in the far south of Israel. It is under the jurisdiction of the Hevel Eilot Regional Council. In 2024 it had a population of 207.

== History ==
Elifaz was founded in January 1983 by a group of Nahal members from Jerusalem, Bat Yam, Haifa and Nahariya. The kibbutz is affiliated with the Kibbutz HaArtzi movement. The name "Elifaz" was inspired by Eliphaz in the Book of Job (f.e. Job 2:11). In the Negev there are also kibbutzim with the names of the two other "friends" of Job; former Mahane Bildad, since 2001 named Tzukim, and Tzofar.

In 2012 it became the first kibbutz in Israel to accept Druze residents; Haza and Nibal Tafesh were unanimously approved as full-fledged members, making them the first Druze in Israel to join a kibbutz.

In 2014, the solar energy developer Arava Power Company inaugurated six solar fields in the Arava and Negev, generating a total of 36 megawatts of electricity. One of these solar fields is in Elifaz.

== See also ==
- Solar energy in Israel
