= Neot Smadar =

Kibbutz in southern Israel

Neot Smadar: נאות סמדר (Hebrew); نئوت سمدار (Arabic)
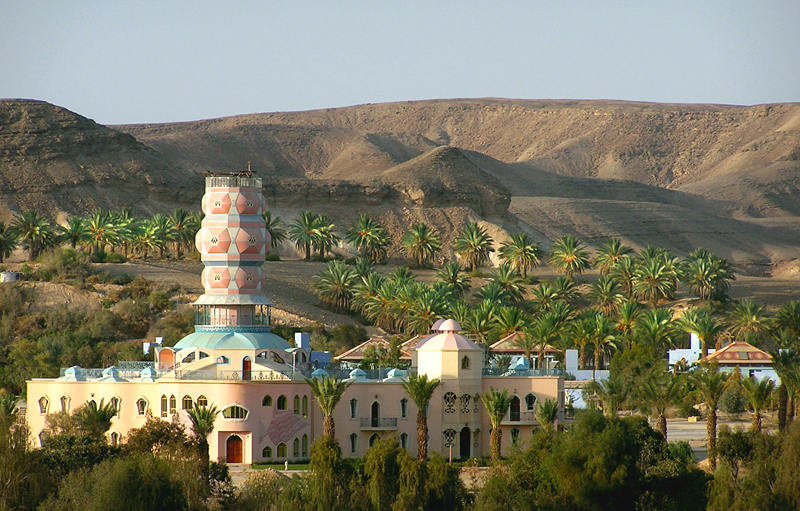

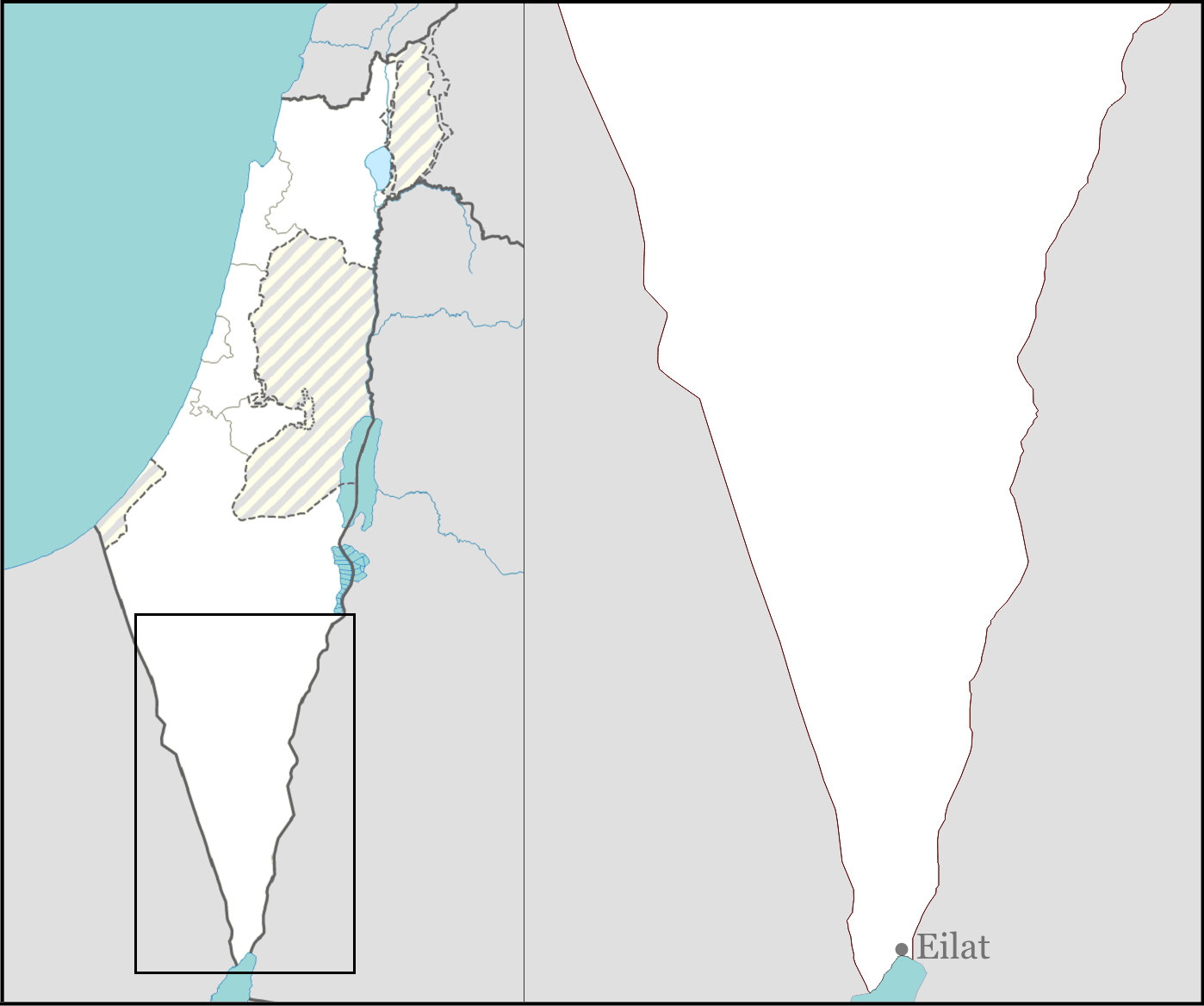
- Location within Southern Negev region of Israel
- Coordinates: 30°2′54″N 35°1′31″E
- Country: Israel
- District: Southern
- Subdistrict: Beersheba
- Council: Hevel Eilot
- Affiliation: Kibbutz Movement
- Founded: 1989
- Founder: Jerusalemite Jews
- Population (2024): 273
- Website: www.neot-semadar.com

Neot Smadar (Hebrew: נְאוֹת סְמָדַר, lit. Oasis of grape blossoms) is a kibbutz in southern Israel which is located in the Arava Desert. It falls under the jurisdiction of Hevel Eilot Regional Council with an area of 80 hectares. In 2024 it had a population of 273. Neot Smadar was named one of the fifty-two "Best Tourism Villages 2025" by UN Tourism.

== History ==
Neot Smadar is located in the southern Negev about 70 km. north of Eilat. The kibbutz was established in 1989, on the grounds of an abandoned kibbutz, Shizafon. Kibbutz Shizafon had been established in 1980, but its plan for growth was unsuccessful and in 1988, after it had just 15 residents left, it was abandoned. When the new pioneers settled on the site, they initially retained the name Shizafon. In 2001, the name was changed to Neot Smadar, partially in memory of Smadar Safra, the wife of one of the founders, Yosef Safra, who had been killed in a traffic accident in 1981.

The guesthouse on a hill nearby was built on the grounds of the abandoned Nahal settlement Ya'alon. Neot Smadar is as an organic community featuring architecturally unique buildings with passive cooling towers. The Art Center houses 14 workshops for Stained glass, ceramics, textile, wood and metals. The building is insulated with mud bricks, and "air conditioning" is supplied by a desert cooling tower.

The kibbutz uses "daily life, work, and the environment as a mirror to observe human behavior and foster mindfulness." Every seven years, the kibbutz members leave their homes and are assigned new ones.

== Economy ==
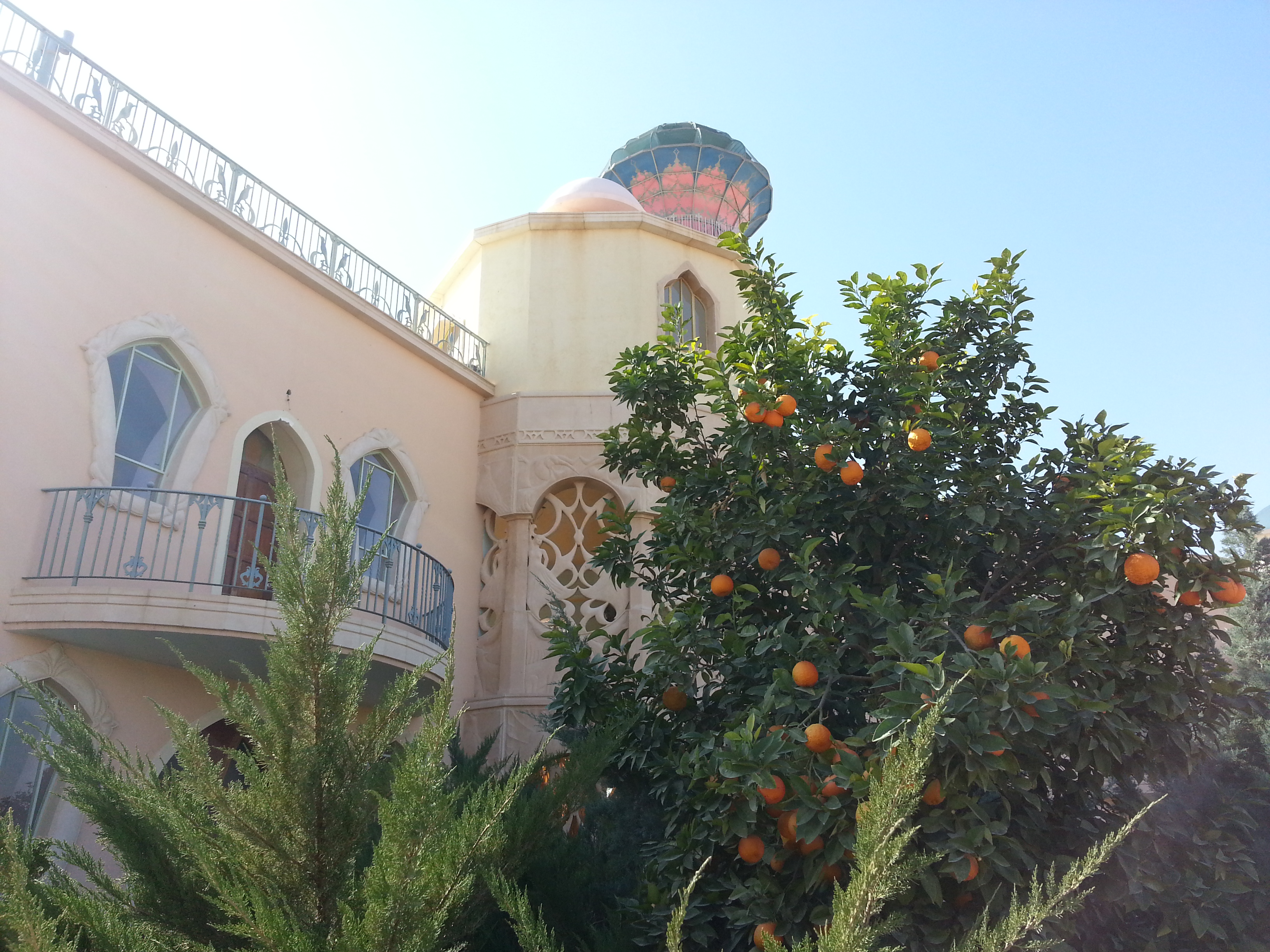

The kibbutz tends 500 dunams of organically cultivated vineyards (origin of the place name), deciduous trees, olives, date plantations and an herb garden. Olive oil is produced in a cold press set up with assistance from ICA and Israel's Ministry of Industry and Trade in 2001. The oil has been conferred the highest grade by Israel's Olive Council. The kibbutz also operates a boutique organic winery and produces a variety of cheeses from fresh goat milk. Its roadside restaurant, Pundak Neot Smadar, offers vegetarian food and sells the kibbutz's organic products.

As a tourism village, the goal is to host 1,000 guests a month. The object is sustainable tourism "that doesn't overwhelm the community."

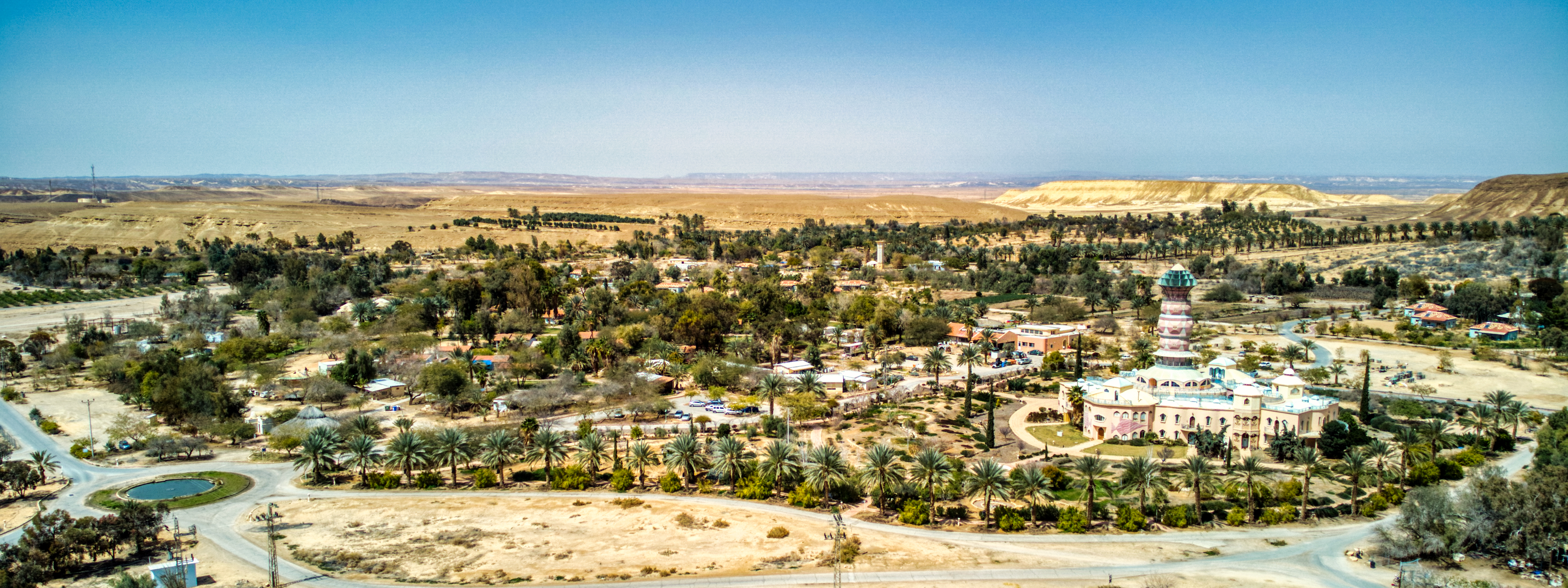
Neot Smadar - West

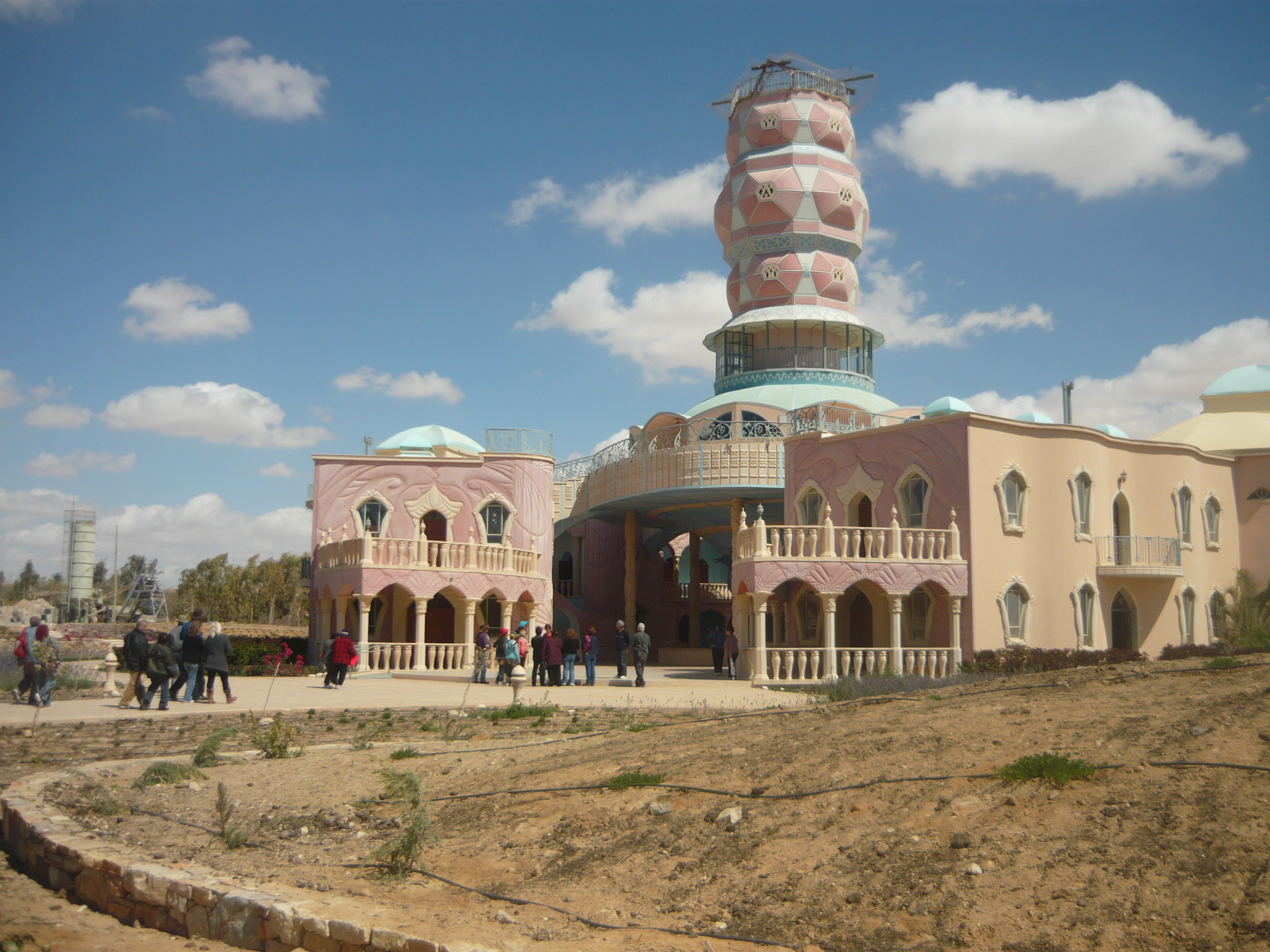
Neot Smadar arts center
