= Shitim =

Shitim: שיטים (Hebrew); شيتيم (Arabic)
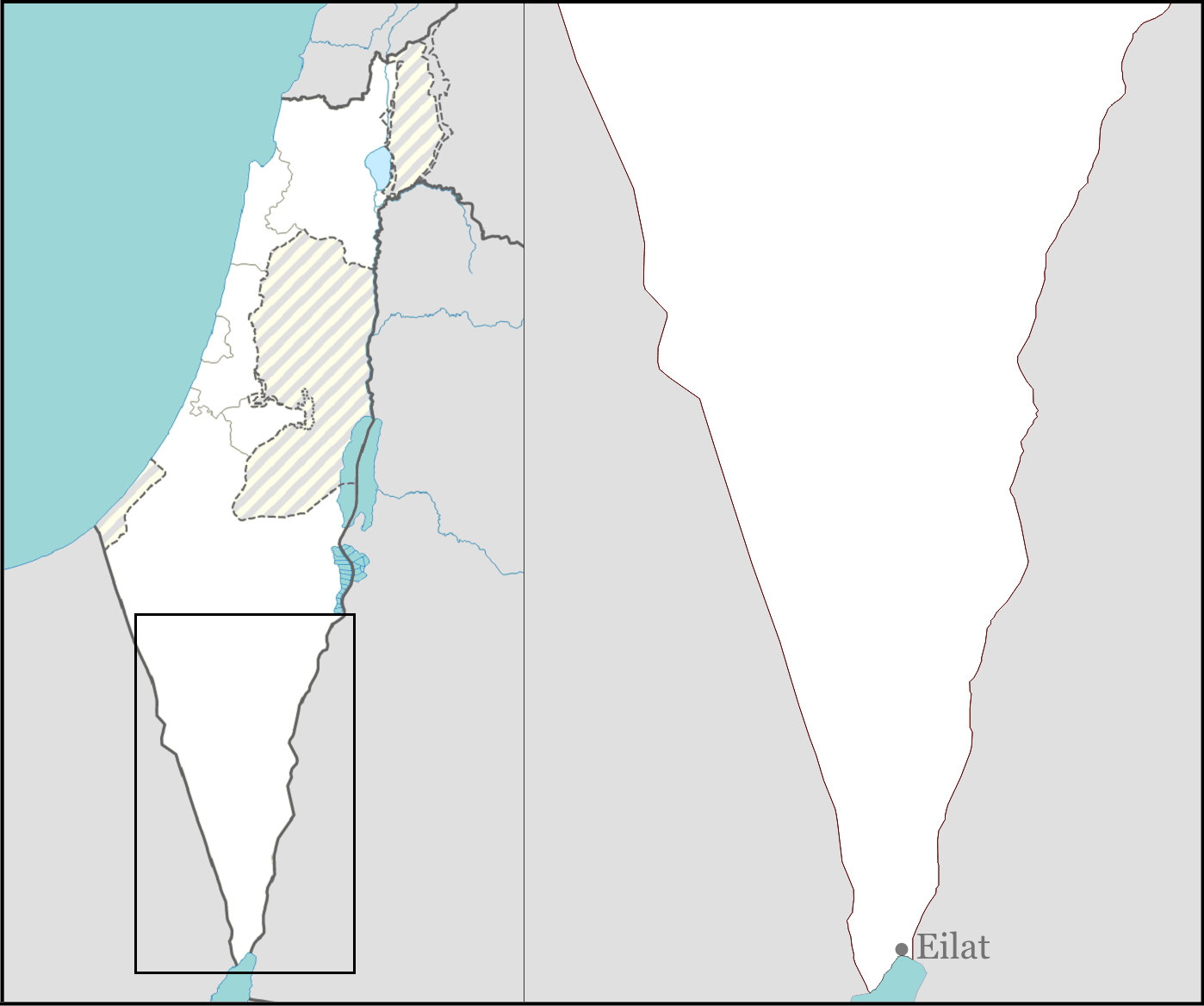
- Location within Southern Negev region of Israel Location within Israel
- Coordinates: 30°10′36″N 35°00′59″E
- Country: Israel
- District: Southern
- Council: Hevel Eilot
- Founded: 1984
- Population (2019): 4

Shitim (Hebrew: שיטים) is a community settlement in southern Israel. Located in the Arabah valley, it falls under the jurisdiction of Hevel Eilot Regional Council. In 2019 it had a population of 4.

== History ==
The village was established in 1984 as a Nahal settlement, with soldiers often living at the site following the end of a combat role and working in nearby kibbutzim. In the early 1990s, the nearby army base was taken over by a different battalion, which largely operated in the West Bank. This caused disruption in the day-to-day agricultural activities of the village and it was abandoned by the IDF in 1997, with the site given to kibbutz Ketura. Attempts to establish a civilian village at the site failed and the settlement was dismantled.

In 2002 a group of followers of Rajneesh founded a guesthouse on the site under the name 'Ashram BaMidbar' (Ashram in the Desert), with people working at the guesthouse re-establishing the village.
