= Ketura, Israel =

Ketura: קְטוּרָה (Hebrew); كيتورا (Arabic)
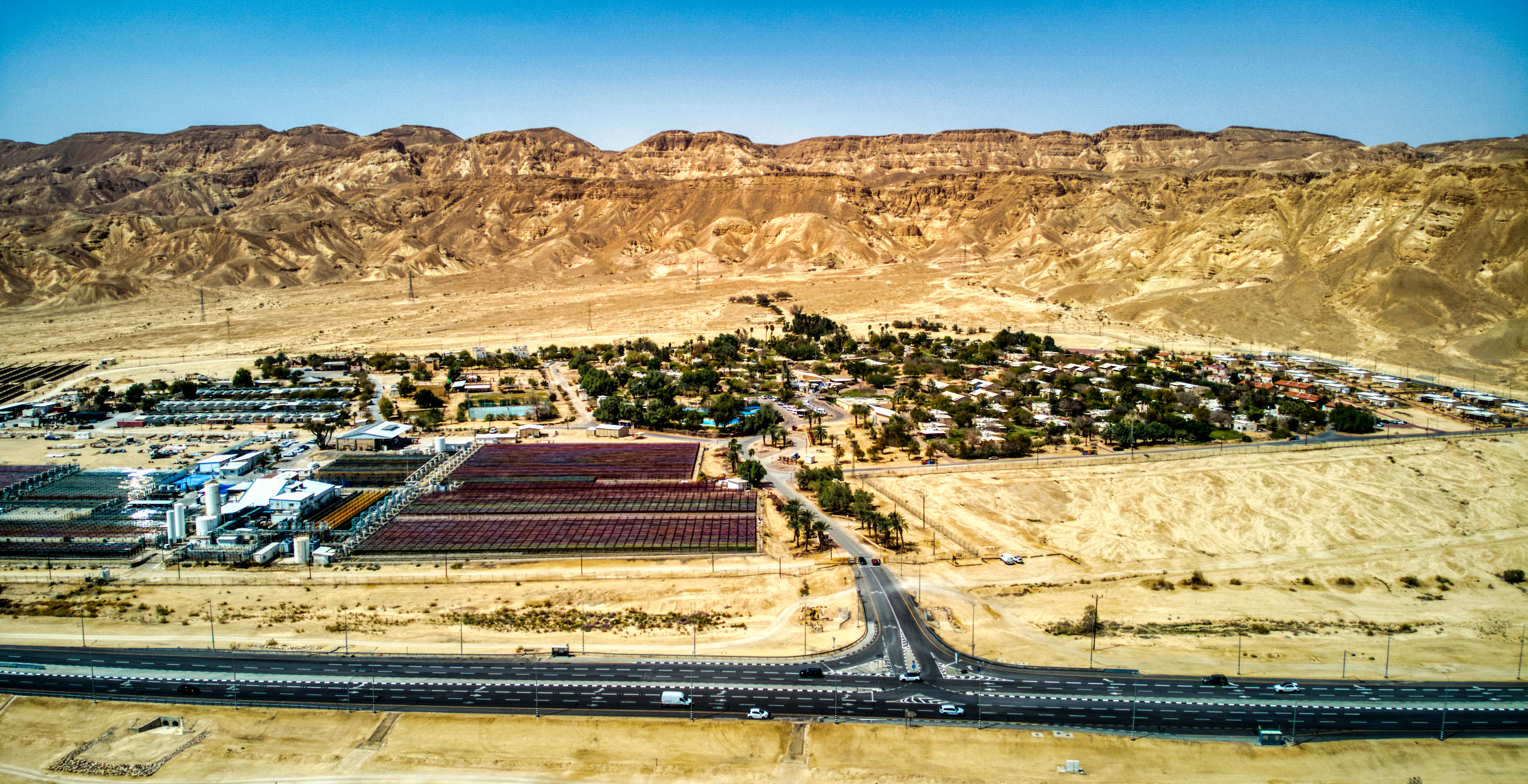

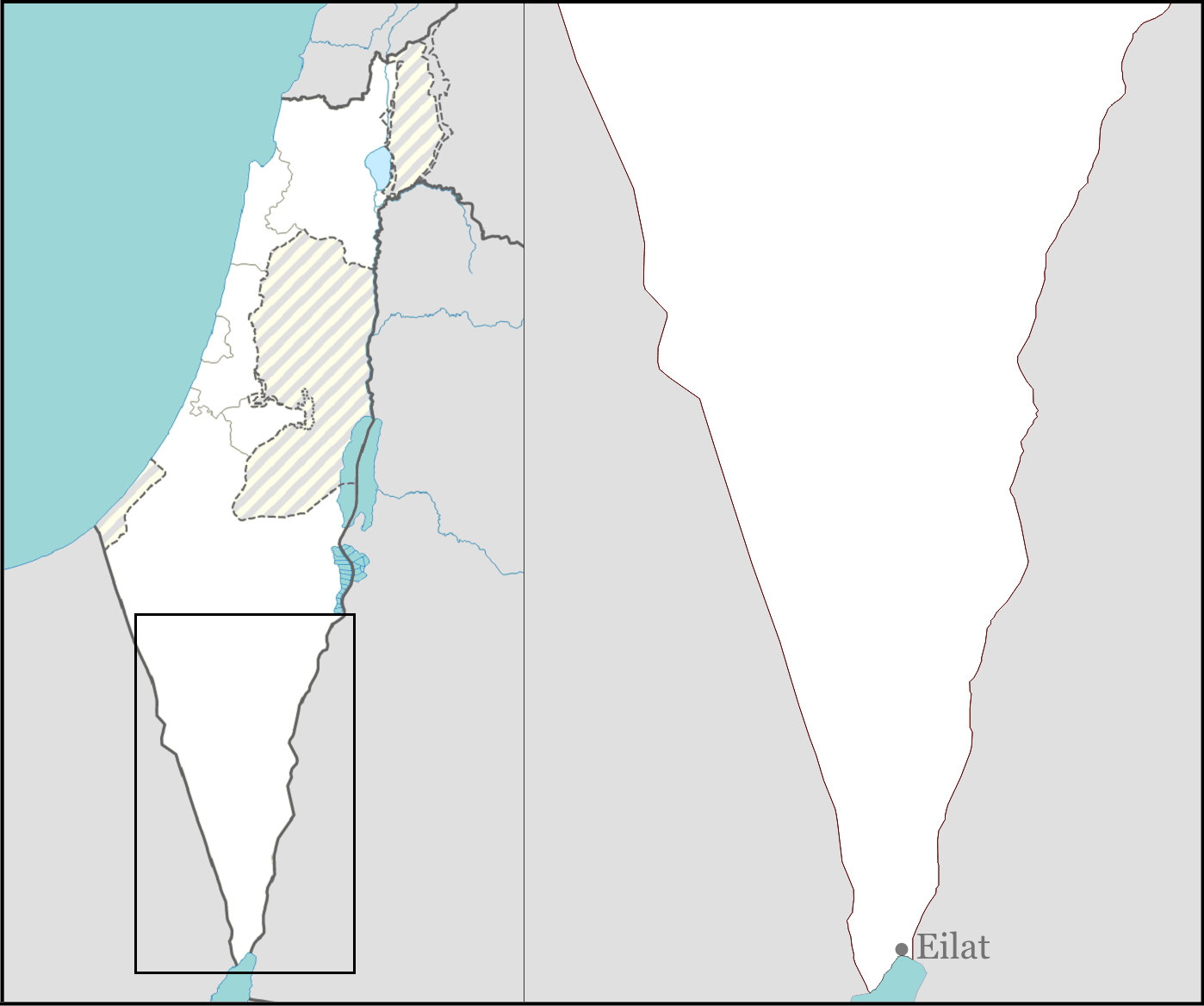
- Location within Southern Negev region of Israel Location within Israel
- Coordinates: 29°58′13″N 35°3′41″E
- Country: Israel
- District: Southern
- Subdistrict: Beersheba
- Council: Hevel Eilot
- Affiliation: Kibbutz Movement
- Founded: November 1973
- Founder: American Young Judaea Members
- Population (2024): 564
- Website: www.ketura.org.il

Ketura (Hebrew: קְטוּרָה) is a kibbutz in southern Israel. Located north of Eilat in the Aravah Valley, it falls under the jurisdiction of Hevel Eilot Regional Council. In 2026, it has a population of around 560 to 570 residents. This includes 165 to 180 adult members and potential candidates, and 150 children and adolescents. The remainder are residents who rent homes from the kibbutz, international students, and temporary residents on various post-army and service year programs.

== Name ==
The name Ketura was taken from a nearby hill and wadi, and is also the name of the second wife of Abraham (Genesis 25:1).

== History ==
Ketura was founded in November 1973 by a group of young American Jewish immigrants, most of them members of the Zionist youth movement Young Judaea. Difficulties in the early years frustrated many of the inhabitants of the kibbutz, which caused many of the founders to leave. At the same time, more Young Judaeans joined the community, along with a variety of other immigrants as well as Israel Boy and Girl Scouts Federation graduates. Ketura is in the Southern Arava - Hevel Eilot Regional Council.

Today Ketura has about 165 members and several young families who are candidates to become members. During the year there are about 500 people living on Ketura, members and their families, students in the Arava Institute for Environmental Studies, volunteers from around the world, Arava International Center for Agriculture Training (AICAT) students from around the world, NOAM youth movement members in various programs such as gap year or service year (shnat sherut), Israeli post-army 'avoda muedefet' participants, and researchers who come to work in regional institutes.

== Religious culture ==
Ketura is unique among kibbutzim for its religious pluralism. Although the kibbutz is not considered a religious kibbutz, Jewish dietary laws (kashrut) and Sabbath rules are observed in the dining room, public areas, and at social and cultural events, and there is a functioning congregation-led egalitarian synagogue. The population of the kibbutz is composed of observant, masorati (moderately observant), and secular members, an unusual situation for a kibbutz. Ketura received the Speaker of the Knesset Prize for religious tolerance as a result of its religious progressiveness.

== Economy ==
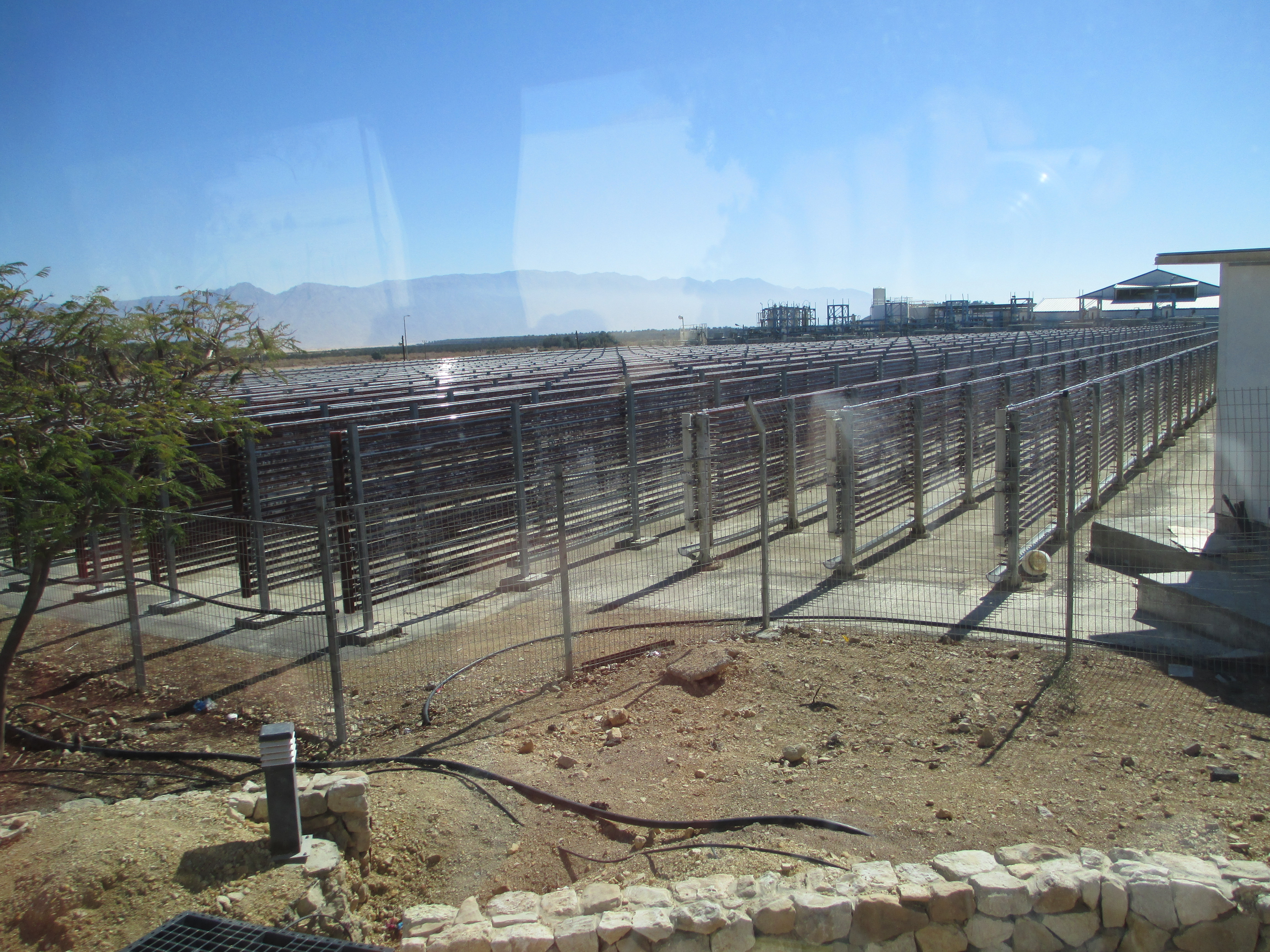
Algae production at Kibbuz Ketura

The kibbutz is best known for its involvement in ecological activities, mainly its partnership in the local algae factory, Algatech, and its guest house and educational seminar center, Keren Kolot. The solar power industry (see below) has been gaining importance locally.

Economic cooperation with other kibbutzim in the area includes a regional date-packing plant, Ardom Computing Services, and Ardag, a large fish hatchery near Eilat. Many members work outside the kibbutz in professional positions such as teachers, physical and occupational therapists, researchers, social workers, and more. Ketura also offers accounting and bookkeeping services, with many members working in these positions. A number of members work in the local NGO—The Arava Institute for Environmental Studies (AIES).

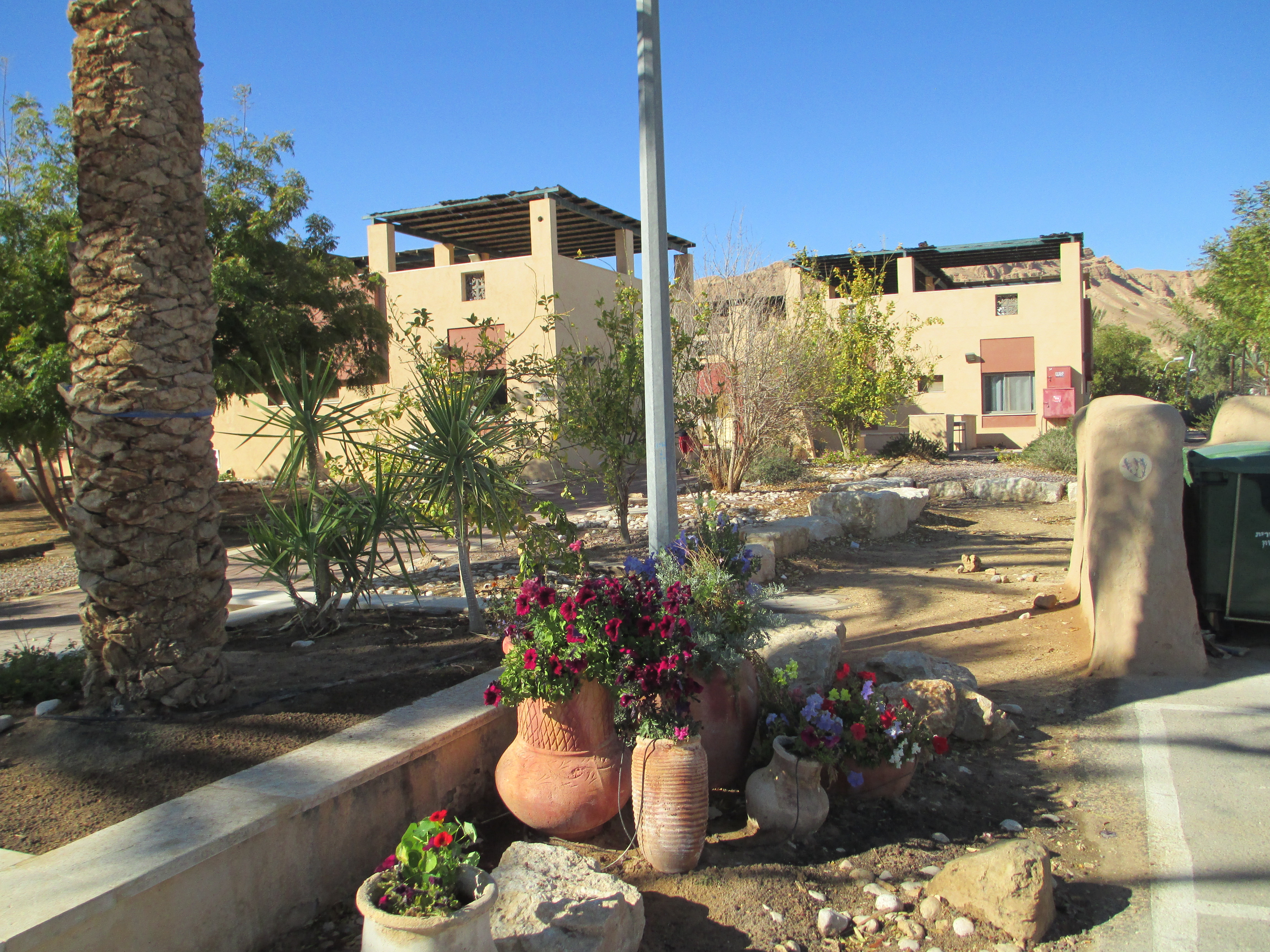
Guest houses in Kibbutz Ketura

=== Agriculture ===
Agricultural enterprises of the kibbutz include date orchards.

=== Guest house and seminar center ===
The kibbutz is well known for its guest house and educational seminar center — Keren Kolot

=== Algae production and processing ===
The red rainwater microalgae (Haematococcus pluvialis) are single-cell organisms, part of the oldest group of living organisms. Their long evolution led them to adapt to extreme conditions and to develop survival mechanisms against bacteria and fungi. Haematococcus pluvialis has been cultivated and processed at Ketura since 1998, when the AlgaTechnologies, Ltd. company was established, for their content of astaxanthin, one of the strongest known natural antioxidant substances, considered to benefic to the immune, cardiovascular and nervous systems, to joints and muscles. The main Algatech product, AstaPure, is natural astaxanthin extracted from the algae. It is mainly sold the United States, Japan and Europe—in total, to more than 30 countries, where it is used as a natural ingredient and pigment for use in cosmetics; and as a nutraceutical, including as an ingredient for dietary supplements. Research has proven astaxanthin to have positive health effects on a multitude of organs and body functions, such as: eyesight, skin, physical effort during sport activities, cognitive abilities, anti-inflammatory effects and so forth. Algatech, to which Kibbutz Ketura is a partner, is considered a leading company in microalgae agriculture and one of the most forward-looking innovators in the field, worldwide.

== Environmentalism ==
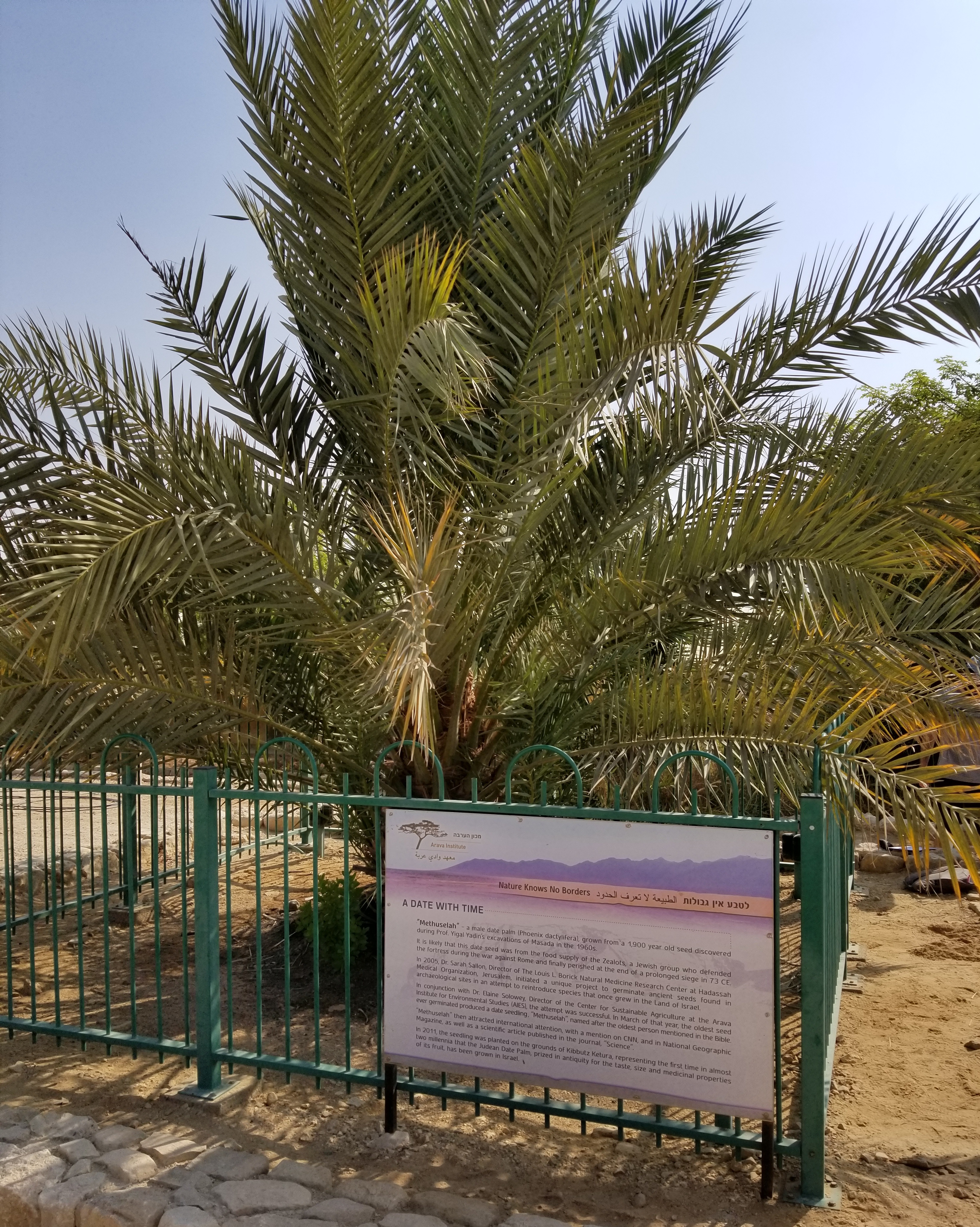
The Judean date palm at Ketura, nicknamed Methuselah

Ketura is part of the Green Kibbutz movement. In addition to promoting awareness, recycling and opening a second-hand store, Ketura planted a community garden and operates a high-tech algae farm.

=== Arava Institute for Environmental Studies ===
Members of Ketura founded the Arava Institute for Environmental Studies (AIES), which is located at Ketura. The institute promotes regional environmental cooperation between Israelis, Palestinians and residents of neighbouring Arab countries in environmental matters, with a focus on desert ecosystems.

=== Solar power ===
Ketura is a partner in the Arava Power Company (APC), producing electricity from solar panels. There is one 4.95MW field on the kibbutz, Ketura Sun, with a second 40MW field opened in 2015, then the largest in Israel.

=== Date palm grown from germinated ancient seed ===
The first surviving example of the Judean date palm, artificially germinated from a 2,000-year-old seed discovered during archaeological excavations in Masada, was planted in Ketura and continues to survive there. It was nicknamed 'Methuselah'. Several others have since been grown from seeds found in the Dead Sea region, including some female specimens, which are likely to one day be pollinated by material from Methuselah.

== Notable people ==
- Yosef Abramowitz

== See also ==
- Agricultural research in Israel
- Grovepoint Capital
- Social entrepreneurship
- Solar power in Israel
- Ecovillages
