= Yahel =

Yahel: יהל (Hebrew); ياهل (Arabic)
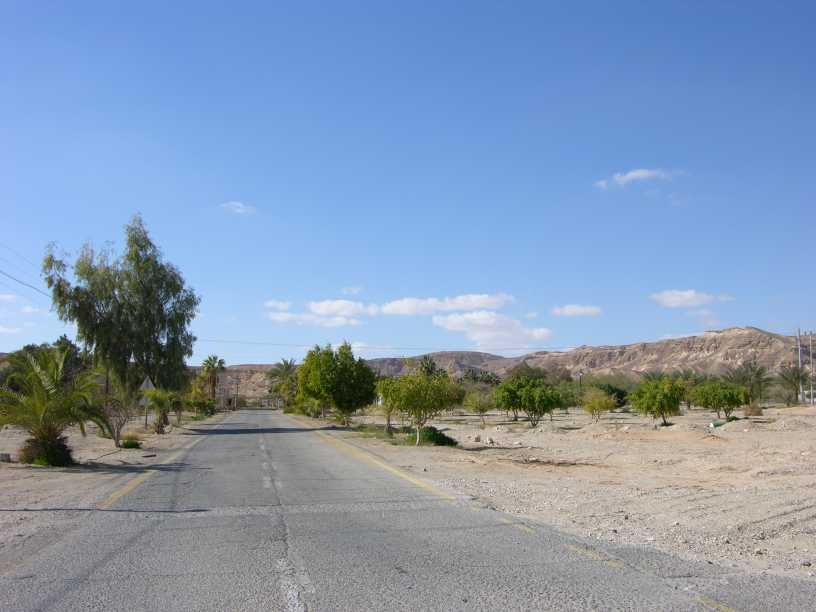
- Entrance to the kibbutz

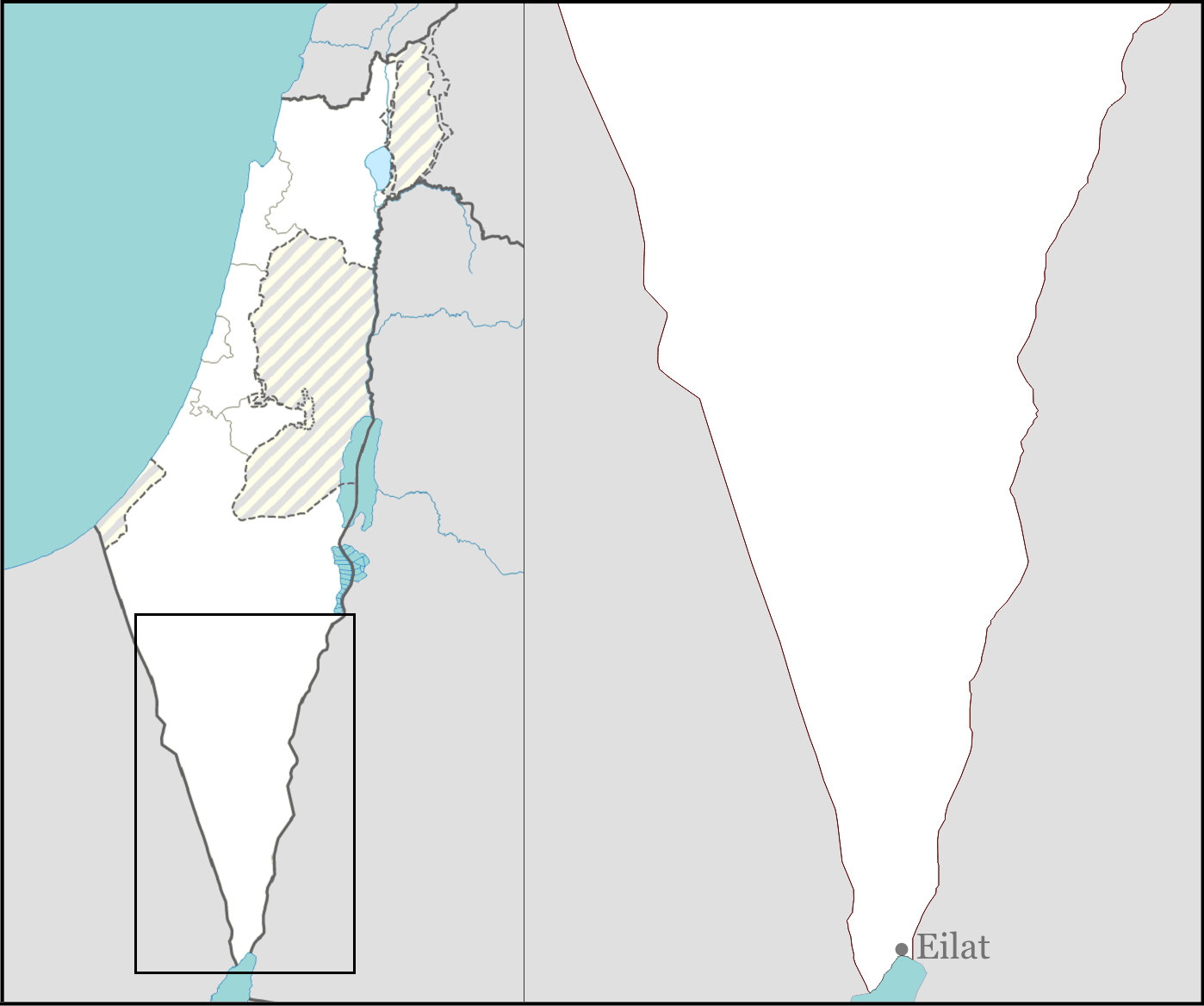
- Location within Southern Negev region of Israel
- Coordinates: 30°5′3″N 35°7′45″E
- Country: Israel
- District: Southern
- Subdistrict: Beersheba
- Council: Hevel Eilot
- Affiliation: Kibbutz Movement
- Founded: 1977
- Founder: Reform movement
- Population (2024): 371

Kibbutz Yahel (Hebrew: יַהֵל) is a Reform kibbutz in southern Israel. Located in the Aravah region of the Negev desert, 60 kilometers from the city of Eilat, it falls under the jurisdiction of Hevel Eilot Regional Council. In 2024 it had a population of 371.

== Etymology ==
The name is symbolic and means: "it shone (shined)". It comes from the Book of Job (Job 31:26).

== History ==
Established in 1977, it was the first kibbutz founded by the Reform Jewish movement.
