= Arava Natural Region =

Coordinates: 29°33′24″N 34°57′04″E

- Natural Region
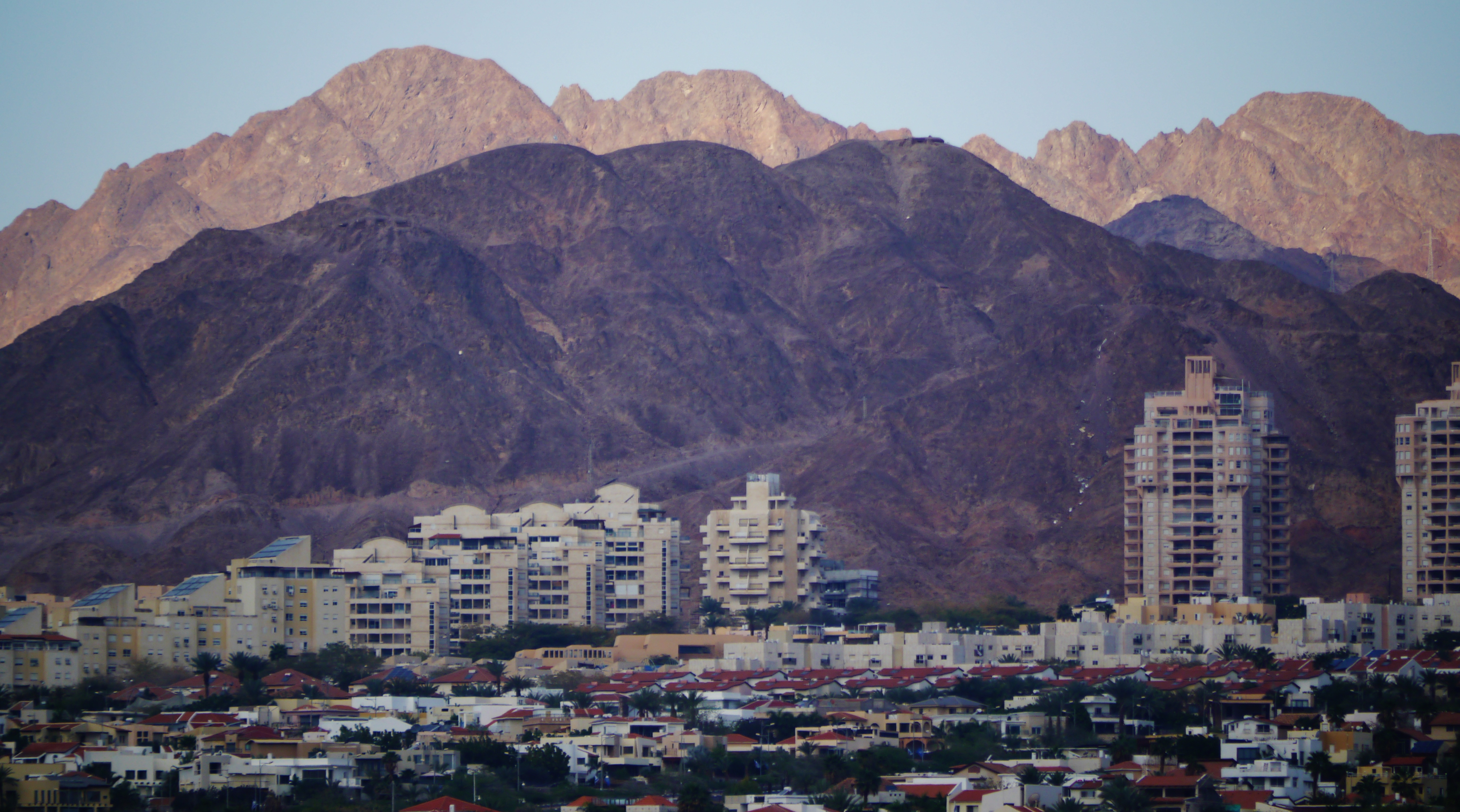
- Eilat and surrounding mountains
- Country: Israel
- District: Southern
- Subdistrict: Beersheba
- Largest City: Eilat

Area
  - Total: 1,123 km^{2} (434 sq mi)

Population (2024)
  - Total: 67,489

Ethnicity
  - Jews and others: 86.2%
  - Arabs: 5.1%

The Arava Natural Region is a natural region in the Beersheba Subdistrict, in the Southern District of Israel. Eilat is the largest city in the natural region.

== Geography ==
Districts, Subdistricts and Natural Regions of the State of Israel, 2018

As its name suggest, the Arava Natural Region contains the entire Arava valley in southern Israel, from Idan all the way to Eilat on the Red Sea coast. It shares a long border with Jordan on its east side. It has an area of 1,123 km^{2}. The largest city in the natural region is Eilat, which contains 83 percent of the natural region's population. There are no other towns in the natural region with more than 2,000 people. The natural region contains the Central Arava Regional Council as well as portions of the Hevel Eilot and Tamar regional councils.

== Demographics ==
86 percent of the residents of the Arava Natural Region are Jewish. 5 percent of residents are Arab, most of whom live in Eilat.

Historical population
Year	Pop.	±%
1972	14,100	—
1983	20,900	+48.2%
1995	36,500	+74.6%
2008	52,400	+43.6%
2022	65,565	+25.1%
2024	67,489	+2.9%

== Administrative local authorities ==
Cities	Local Councils	Villages
Eilat	[None]	Central Arava: Ein Yahav; Hatzeva; Idan; Ir Ovot; Paran; Sapir; Tzofar; Tzukim; Hevel Eilot: Be'er Ora; Eilot; Elifaz; Grofit; Ketura; Lotan; Samar; Yahel; Yotvata; Tamar: Ein Hazeva

== Voting Patterns ==
In the 2022 election, 56 percent of voters in the natural region voted for the parties of the right-wing coalition led by Benjamin Netanyahu, while 41 percent voted for the parties of the center-left coalition led by Yair Lapid and 0.8 percent voted for the Arab parties.

In the 2026 election, 51 percent of voters in the natural region voted for the parties of the right-wing coalition led by Benjamin Netanyahu, while 42 percent voted for the parties of the center-left coalition led by Gadi Eisenkot and 1.6 percent voted for the Arab parties. An additional 3.2 percent voted for the Reservists, and 1.5 percent voted for Amcha Yisrael. Voter turnout increased 24 percent from the 2022 election.
