= High-speed railway to Eilat =

Proposed railway in Israel

The high-speed railway to Eilat (Med-Red) is a proposed Israeli railway that will enable the connection of the main Israeli population centers and Mediterranean ports to the southern city of Eilat on the Red Sea coast, as well as serve commercial freight between the Mediterranean Sea (city of Ashdod) and Red Sea (Eilat). The railway will spur southward from the existing rail line at Beersheba, and continue through Dimona to the Arava, Ramon Airport and Eilat, at a speed of 350 kilometers per hour (220 mph). Its length will be roughly 260 km (160 mi) of electrified double-track rail (not including the Tel Aviv – Beersheba section, an additional 100 km (62 mi)). Currently Dimona railway station is the southernmost passenger train station in Israel and the one with the least boardings/alightings.

The railway, if built, is expected to serve both passengers and freight, including minerals mined from the Negev Desert. The high-speed passenger service will carry travelers from Tel Aviv to Eilat in two hours or less with one intermediate stop (at the Be'er Sheva North railway station), and with a slower service offering from Beersheba to Eilat, stopping at a number of towns and villages in the Arava. The freight service will serve as an alternative to the Suez Canal, allowing countries in Asia to pass goods to Europe through Israel. This possible function of the line was again highlighted in the course of the 2021 Suez Canal obstruction. However, the limited capacity of the Port of Eilat is seen as an impediment to such plans. The line is part of a greater plan to turn Eilat into a metropolitan area numbering 150,000 residents, as well as relocating the Port of Eilat 5 km (3.1 mi) further inland.

== History ==
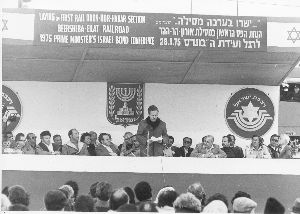
The symbolic laying of the first track of the Beersheba–Eilat railway in the presence of Transport Minister Gad Yaacobi in honour of the Israel Bonds Conference, January 1975

Eilat is located far away from Israel's main population centers, yet serves as an important tourist city and has a strategic location as Israel's only access point to the Red Sea. Historically it has been connected to the rest of the country with poor transportation infrastructure. Both roads to Eilat—Highway 90 and Road 12—have been the scenes of frequent traffic accidents and in some cases terrorist attacks, though in the late 2010s Highway 90 received improvements.

A line was planned after the 1948 Arab–Israeli War, but plans were cancelled in 1952 due to security concerns. In 1955, Prime Minister David Ben-Gurion again decided to build such a railway, and the French expressed interest in the project, just before the Suez Crisis. The idea was again discussed in the 1960s and 70s, and in the 1980s an Australian fund submitted a concrete proposal for funding the construction (at the time estimated at US$250 million). The transportation minister Haim Corfu appointed a committee that recommended starting construction immediately. The government again turned to France to develop the railway. In the 1990s and 2000s, various transportation ministers, including Yisrael Keisar, Meir Sheetrit, Avigdor Lieberman and Shaul Mofaz, promised that such a railway would be built.

In the 2010s the Israeli government approved the construction of a new port and airport for Eilat, a railway, upgraded highways and a light rail system. The plan would see Eilat turn into a metropolitan area numbering 150,000 residents. According to Israeli journalist Guy Bechor, the project would put Israel back on the global trade map.

In 2015, the financial newspaper Globes reported that if the project went ahead, it was likely that Chinese contractors would build the train line and infrastructure, and supply the trains and locomotives.

As of 2019, the project had been indefinitely frozen. But according to a 2020 media report, a rail line to Eilat is planned again. A similar plan was approved by the government in mid 2023.

In 2025, an online meeting open to the public was held to discuss Netivei Israel's plan for the railway between Dimona and Eilat. At the same time, plans to connect Eilat to Kiryat Shmona via Tel Aviv was proposed.

== Planning and financing ==
The project is expected to cost NIS 6–8.6 billion, not including rolling stock, electrification and other related costs—which could be up to NIS 30 billion. Initial planning will cost NIS 150 million and will come out of the Netivei Israel budget (Netivei Israel is a national program to build additional roads and railways). It is estimated that the line would not directly return the investment cost.

In October 2011, Israeli Minister of Transport Yisrael Katz signed a cooperation agreement regarding the railway with his Chinese counterpart. In May 2012, Katz signed a similar agreement with Spain regarding general transportation development, which may involve the railway. He also conducted talks on the subject with the Indian tourism minister. In all, ten countries have taken interest in the project, with Canada, France, Germany, Italy, Japan, South Korea and the United States being the other seven.

On February 5, 2012, the Israeli cabinet unanimously approved continuing to pursue the project. There are three possible financing options: Build-operate-transfer, through an agreement with a foreign government, or complete funding by the Israeli government. Transport minister Katz put his support behind a partnership with a foreign government, and the Prime Minister's Office will have the final say. The finance ministry opposes a deal with a foreign government without issuing a tender.

A ministerial committee approved the plan in 2013.

== Route ==
The route to Eilat crosses hundreds of kilometers of rough desert terrain, with frequent elevation changes and the potential for flash floods. This is particularly challenging to high-speed railway construction whose aim is to avoid sharp curves along the route. The topographically challenging nature of the route (and consequently the large investment required) is one of the main reasons the railway hasn't been constructed to date, despite the frequently expressed desire of various Israeli governments for such a line to be built.

The railway's proposed route can be divided into three parts: Beersheba–Dimona, Dimona – Mount Tzin and Mount Tzin – Eilat. The line would connect to the existing railway to Beersheba which is already double tracked and is planned for electrification but the existing railway between Dimona and Mount Tzin will need to be double-tracked, electrified and upgraded to allow a speed of up to 160 kilometers per hour (99 mph). The project will feature 63 bridges spanning a total of 4.5 kilometers and 9.5 kilometers of tunnels. Four more kilometers of tunnels may be built in the Mount Tzin area to further shorten the route and travel time. Therefore, the railway will have separate tracks for passenger and freight traffic in the Mount Tzin area, where passenger trains will make use of the 4 km shortcut tunnel, while freight trains will use the longer, but more gradually inclining existing freight route.

The Beersheba–Dimona section is 34 km (21 mi), the Dimona – Mount Tzin section is 54 km (34 mi) and the Arava section is about 170 km (110 mi). The Arava section would run through the natural habitat of halocnemum strobilaceum, a desert plant thought to have been extinct, but rediscovered in 2012. The section from Dimona to Hatzeva and Paran through the Mount Tzin area was approved by the National Planning and Construction Committee on March 5, 2013.

A preliminary plan envisioned nine stations in the Arava and Eilat section: from north to south, Hatzeva, Sapir, Paran, Yahel, Yotvata, Timna Airport, Shchoret, Eilat Center and the Port of Eilat.

== Technical and service specifications ==
The railway route in the Arava will allow a maximum speed of 230 to 300 kilometres per hour (143 to 186 mph). The line will be fully electrified and double tracked.

The passenger service will feature an express and regular service options. The route is being planned such that travel on the express route from the Tel Aviv HaHagana Railway Station to Eilat will take two hours or less. An estimated 3.5 million passengers will use the service every year.

The freight service is expected to transport about 2.5 million metric tons (2.5 million long tons) of chemicals and 140,000 cars a year for the local market. In addition to the local market, the railway will serve Asian countries that want to transport freight to Europe by serving as a land bridge from the Red Sea to the Mediterranean Sea; in that respect it will compete with the Suez Canal, although the Israel Port Authority and Israeli Prime Minister Benjamin Netanyahu have stated that it is not meant to compete on a regular basis. According to Netanyahu, China and India have expressed interest in the project. On the other hand, Egyptian officials have criticized the project as an alleged attempt to harm the Egyptian economy.
