= Ein Yahav Airfield =

Coordinates: 30°37′17.39″N 35°12′11.36″E

Ein Yahav Airfield מנחת ספיר
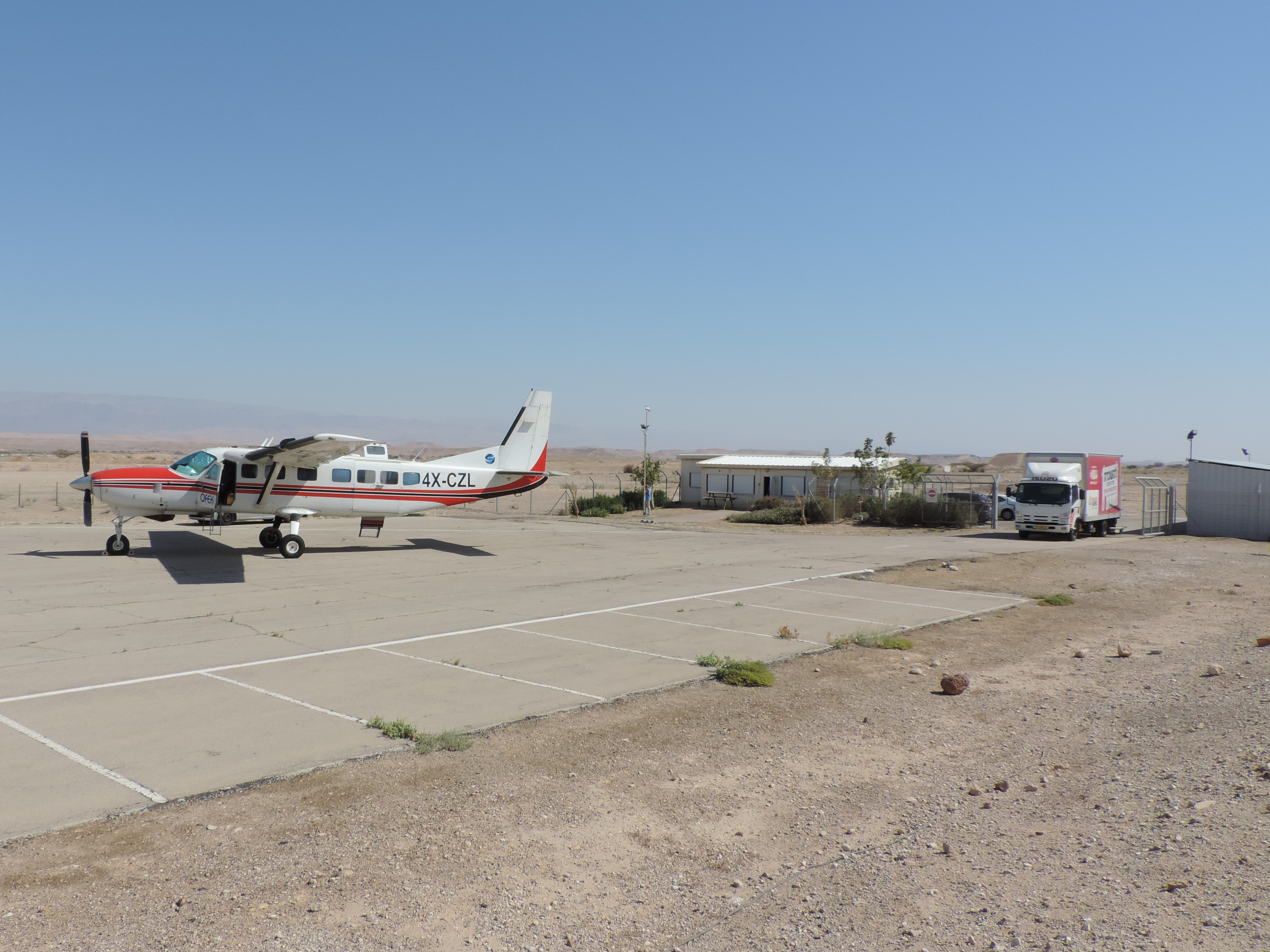
- IATA: EIY; ICAO: LLEY

Summary
- Airport type: Public
- Location: Sapir
- Elevation AMSL: 164 ft / 50 m
- Interactive map of Ein Yahav Airfield

Runways
Direction	Length		Surface
Direction	ft	m	Surface
19/01	4,000	1,219	Asphalt

Ein Yahav Airfield (Hebrew: מנחת עין יהב), officially known as Sapir Airfield (מנחת ספיר), is a small desert airfield in southern Israel's Arabah between the Dead Sea and Eilat. The airfield is located across Highway 90 from Sapir, and not far from Ein Yahav. It was constructed in 1970, and from 1989 until 2012 it had scheduled flights to the now-defunct Sde Dov Airport in Tel Aviv, operated by Elrom Airways. As of July 2019, there are no scheduled flights at the airport.
