= EIY =

EIY or Eiy may refer to:

== Eiy ==
- Alternative name of Ich, Zanjan, Iran

== EIY ==
- IATA code for Ein Yahav Airfield
- Party receiving votes in the 1998 Venezuelan parliamentary election
- Acronym for East India Youth (born 1991), English musician
