= Ovot =

Ovot may refer to:

Oboth or Ovot, a biblical location where the Israelites camped during their Exodus journey

Ir Ovot, a former agricultural cooperative (kibbutz) in Israel which was located in the northeastern Negev's Arava region.
