= Idan, Israel =

Moshav in southern Israel

Idan: עידן (Hebrew)
- Community settlement
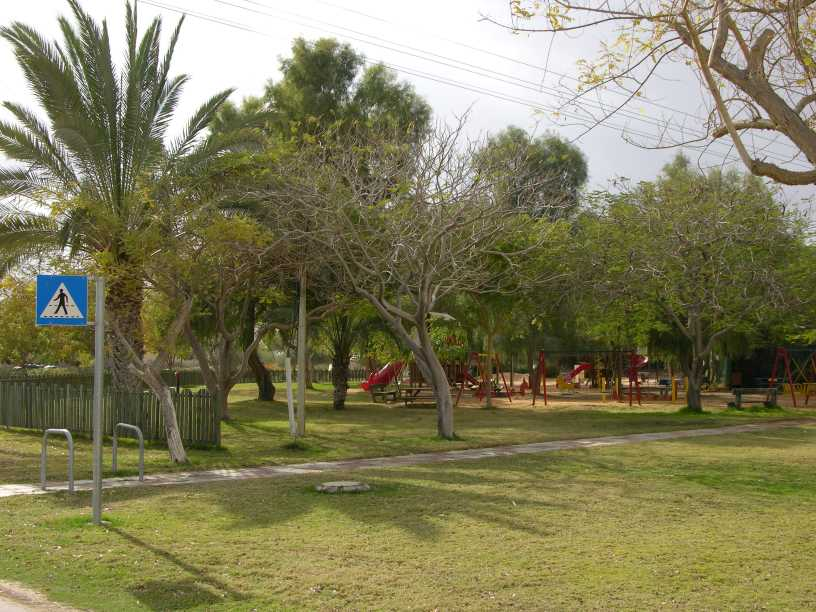

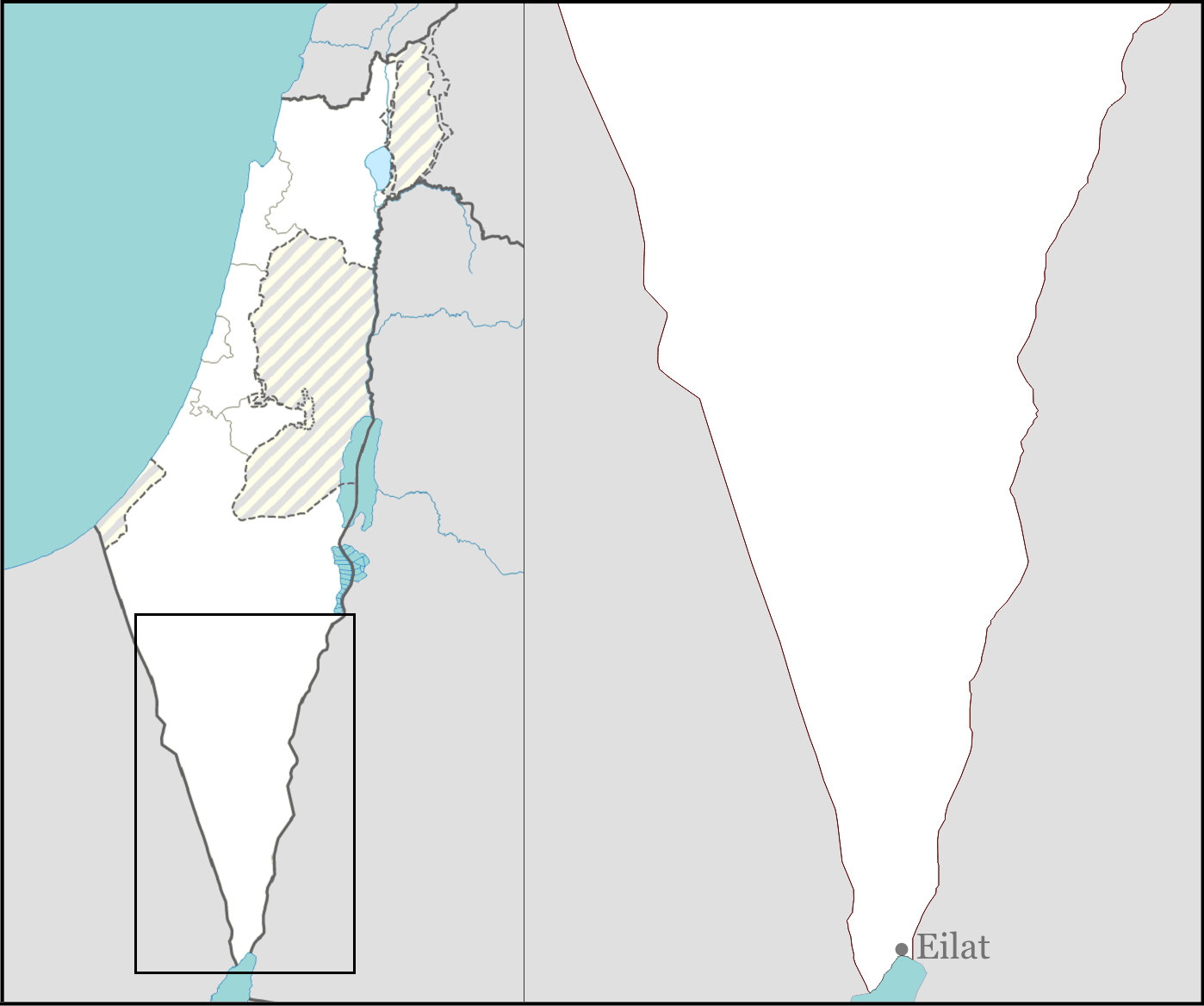
- Location within Southern Negev region of Israel Location within Israel
- Coordinates: 30°48′20″N 35°18′1″E
- Country: Israel
- District: Southern
- Subdistrict: Beersheba
- Council: Central Arava
- Affiliation: Moshavim Movement
- Founded: 1980
- Founder: Immigrants from USA, Canada and South Africa
- Population (2024): 854

Idan (Hebrew: עידן) is a moshav in southern Israel. Located in the Arabah valley, it falls under the jurisdiction of the Central Arava Regional Council. In 2024 it had a population of 854.

== History ==
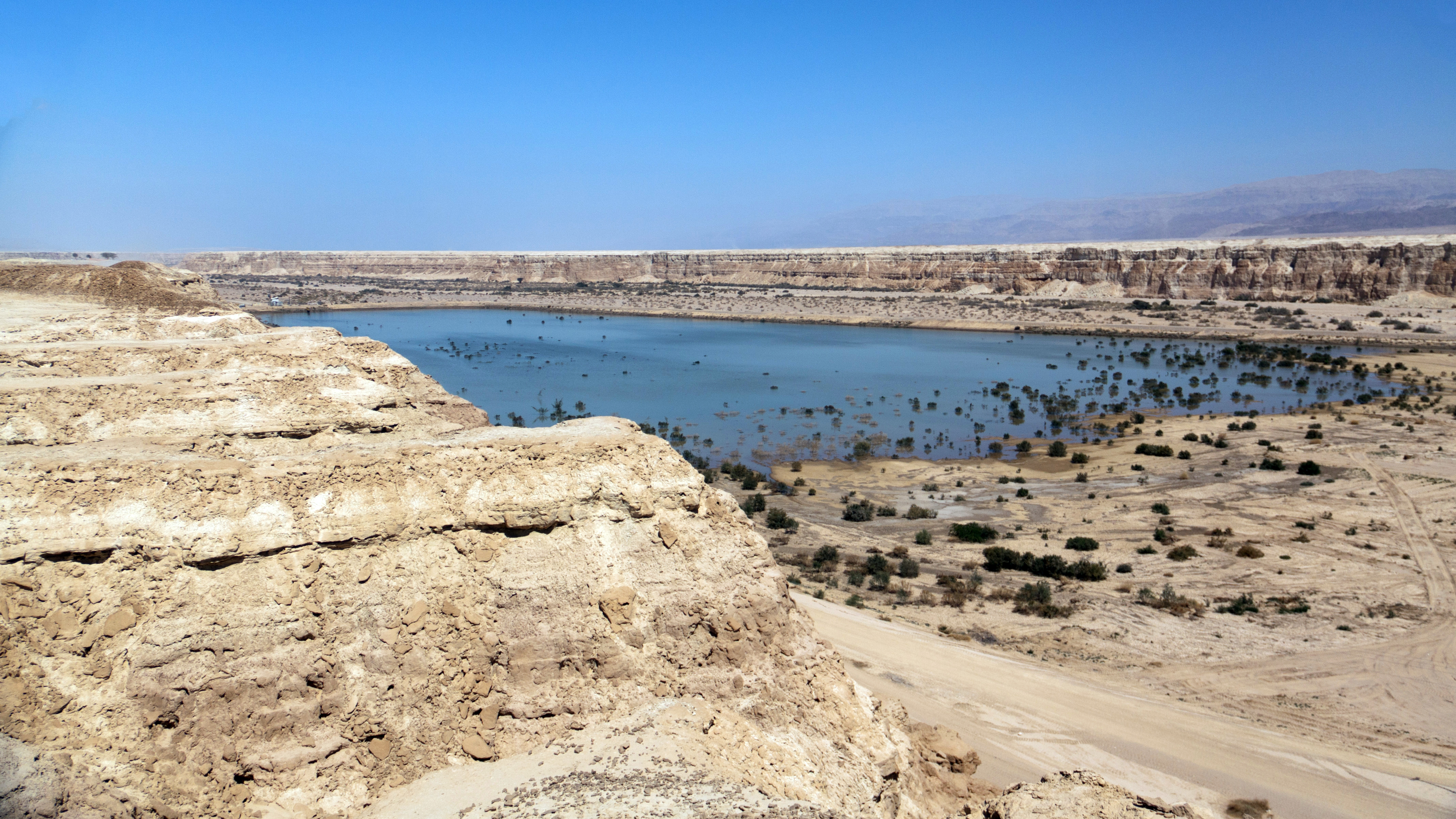
Idan reservoir

Idan was founded in 1980 by immigrants from Canada, the United States, and South Africa, who had organized in 1976. It takes its name from the nearby Idan Stream, which was in turn named after the Arab name for the stream, Wadi al-Aidan. In 2005, it had a population of 150. After the Israel–Jordan peace treaty, some of the lands of Idan were handed over to Jordan.

== Peace road ==
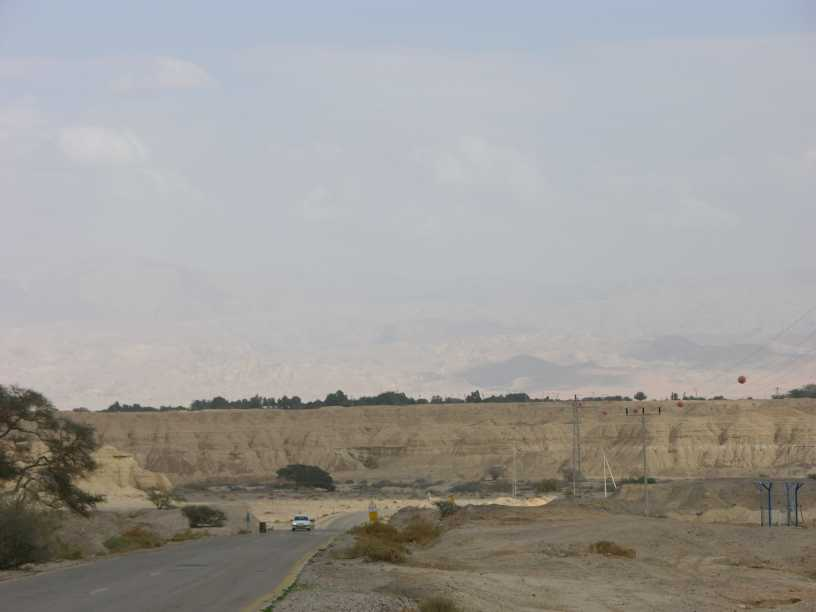
Road to Idan

Between Idan and Hatzeva is a service road, called Peace Road. The Jewish National Fund paved the Peace Route, along the border between Israel and Jordan, for the benefit of central Arava inhabitants, following the Israel-Jordan Peace Treaty of 1994. The road runs along the foot of the Arava Cliffs, opposite the Edom Mountains, and is surrounded by agricultural fields and sandy expanses. A picnic area, lookouts and a trail have been built along the way. The road allows easy access to the eastern part of the Shezaf Nature Reserve.
