= Tzukim =

Tzukim: צוקים (Hebrew)
- Community settlement
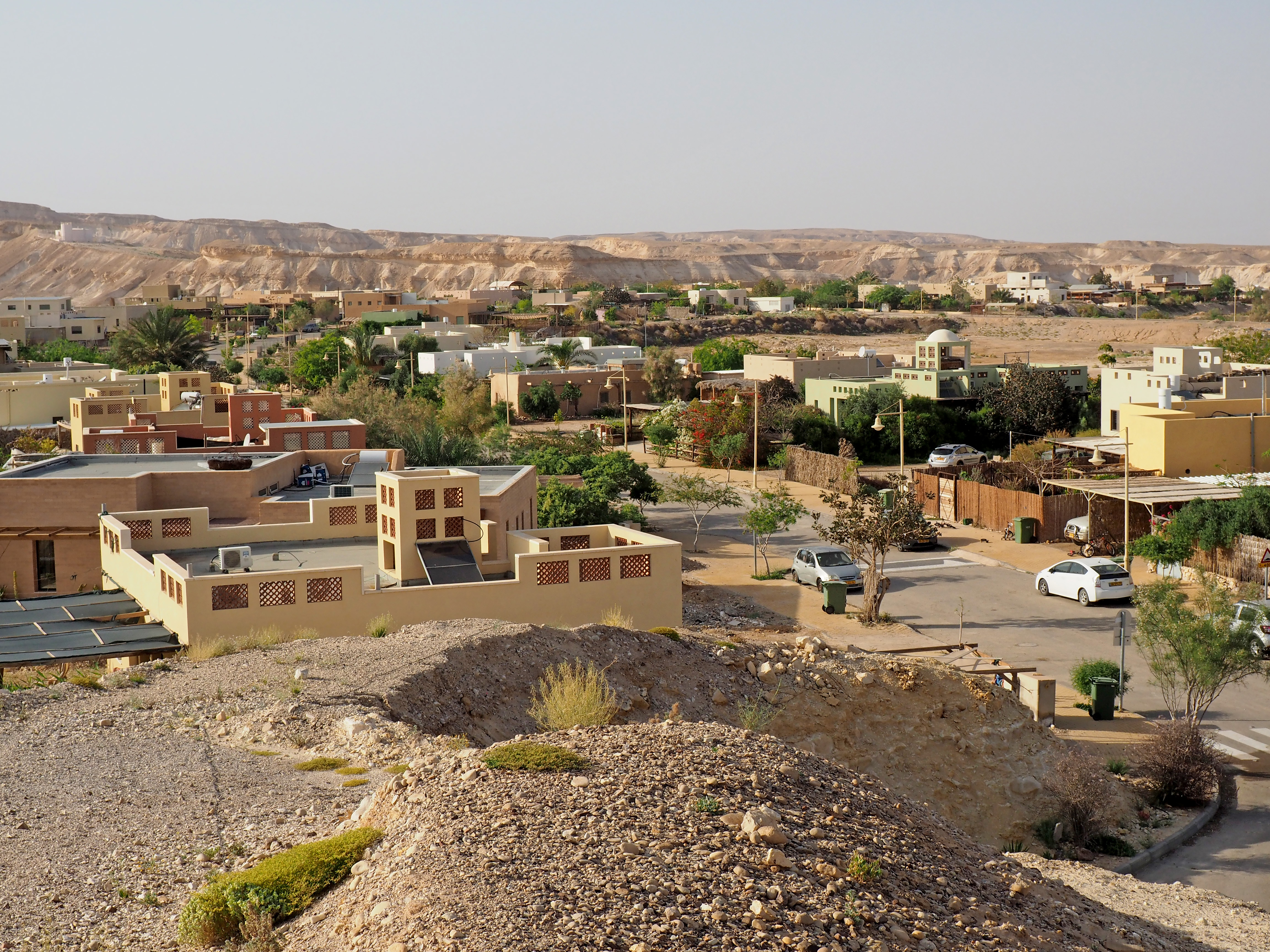
- Etymology: Cliffs
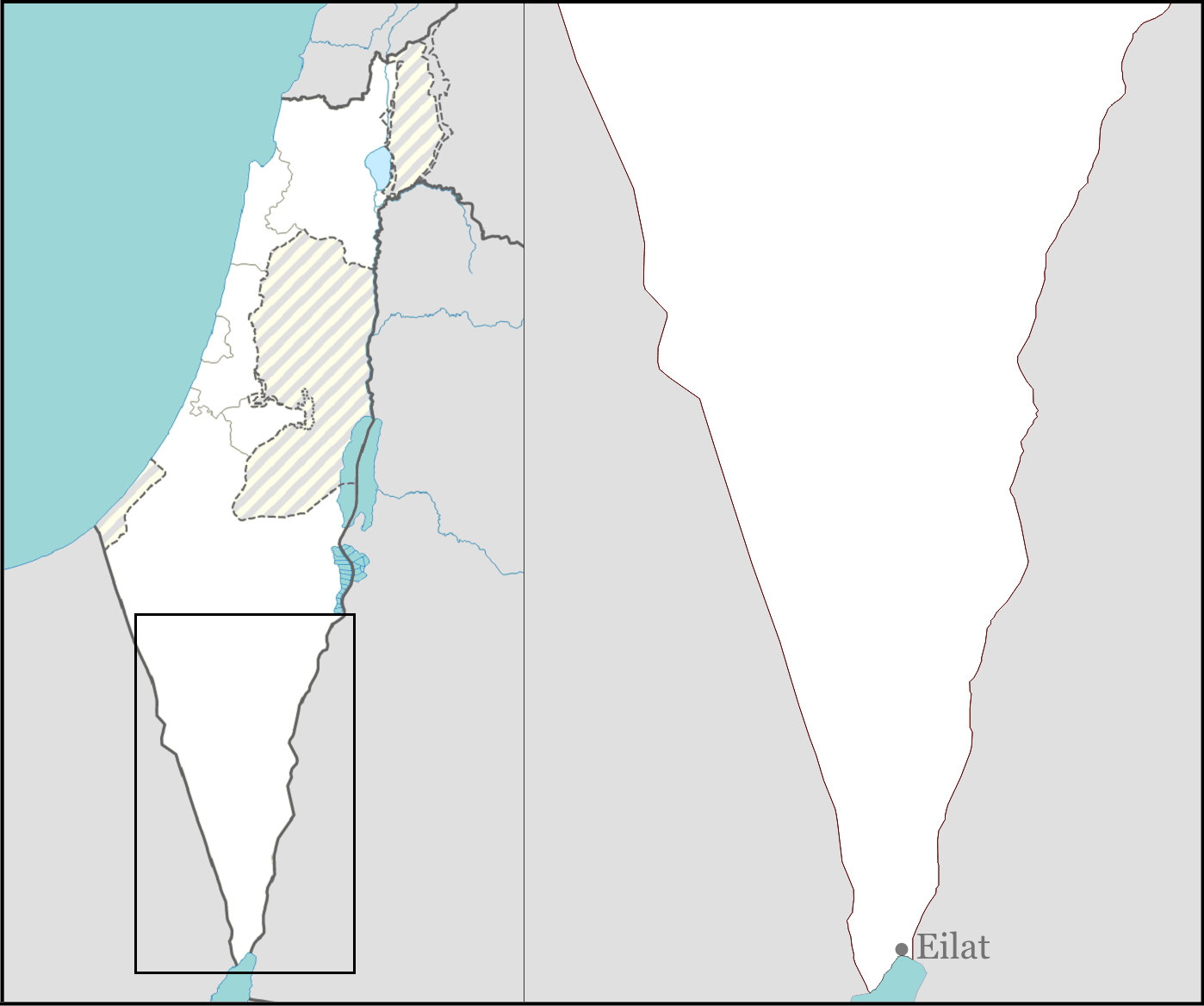
- Location within Southern Negev region of Israel Location within Israel
- Coordinates: 30°29′27″N 35°10′0″E
- Country: Israel
- District: Southern
- Subdistrict: Beersheba
- Council: Central Arava
- Founded: 2001
- Founder: Nahal
- Population (2024): 384

Tzukim (Hebrew: צוקים, lit. 'Cliffs') is a community settlement in southern Israel. Located in the Arava valley, 8 km south of Tzofar, it falls under jurisdiction of the Central Arava Regional Council. In 2024 it had a population of 384.

== History ==
Tzukim was founded in 2001 on land vacated by the Bildad army camp, which was founded in 1983 and named after Bildad, one of the "friends" of Biblical Job. In the Negev there are also kibbutzim with the names of the two other "friends": nearby Tzofar and Elifaz in the southern Arava. Bildad also served as a transit point for new settlement in the Arava valley.

The first settlement phase of Tzukim was supposed to begin in 2003, with fifty families. The first settlers were people in their 40s from central Israel. Tzukim's economy is mainly based on tourism, education and art. 200 guest houses are planned here as well as restaurants and spas. By 2008, twelve rooms had been built and with 70 under construction. Today there 3 active kindergartens and also a youth movement in the settlement.

== Culture ==
Around the cliffs, 7 desert accommodation complexes have been established, ranging from mud huts to luxurious suites.

"Films in the Arava - International Film Festival" is an international open-air desert film event held in the cliffs every year.

The abandoned Bildad camp has been transformed into an artists' village with workshops for ceramics, painting, sculpture, woodwork and jewelry. There is a nature store and a coffee roasting house on site.
