= Central Arava Regional Council =

Regional council in Beersheba, Israel

Central Arava Regional Council מועצה אזורית הערבה התיכונה
- Regional council

Hebrew transcription(s)
  - Translit.: Mo'atza Azorit HaArava HaTikhona
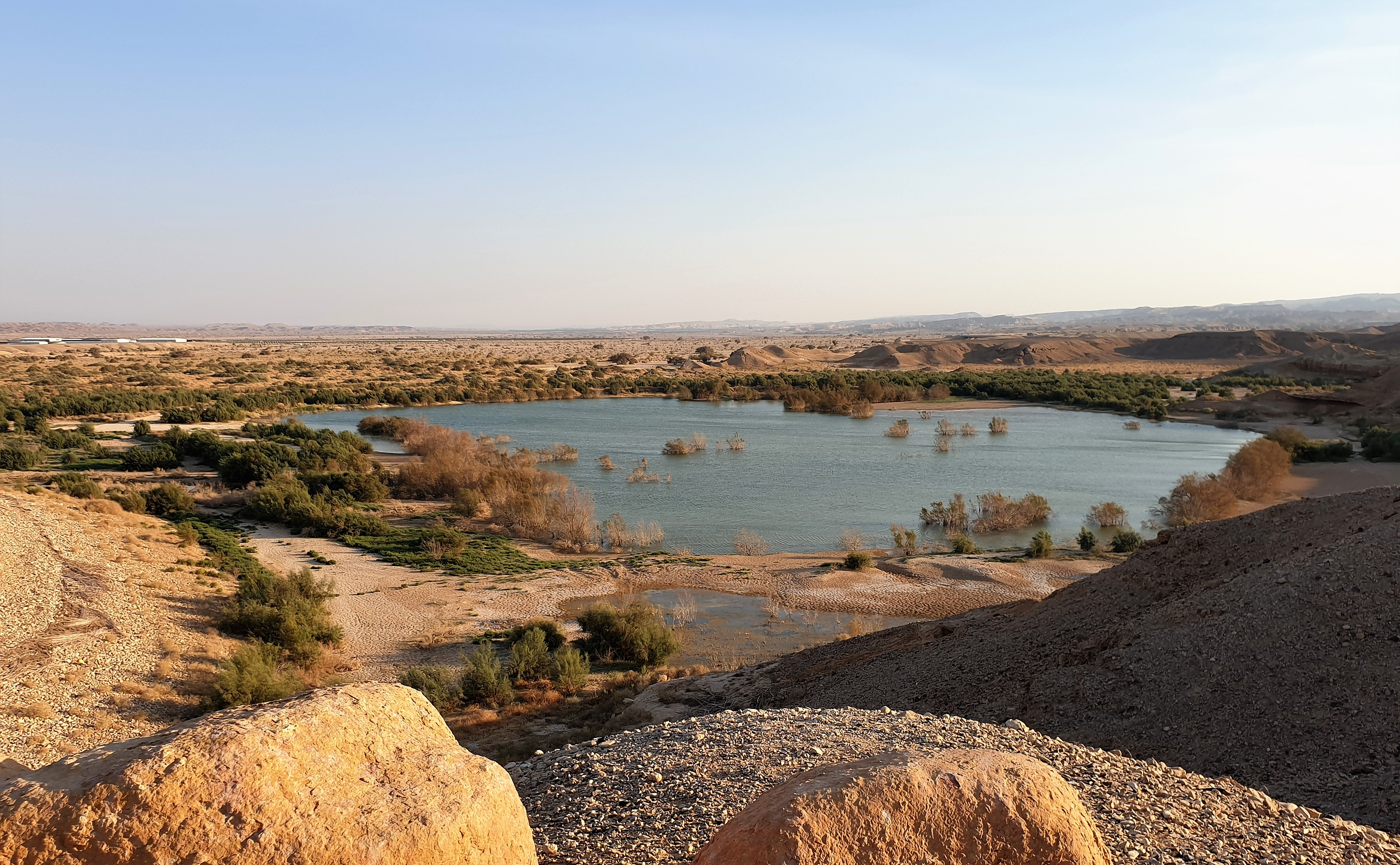
- View of a reservoir on the Nekarot stream
- Interactive map of Central Arava Regional Council
- Country: Israel
- District: Southern
- Subdistrict: Beersheba
- Natural region: Arava
- Founded: 1977

Government
  - Head of Municipality: Meir Tzur

Area
  - Total: 36,910 dunams (36.91 km^{2}; 14.25 sq mi)

Population (2024)
  - Total: 6,752
  - Density: 182.9/km^{2} (473.8/sq mi)

The Central Arava Regional Council (Hebrew: מועצה אזורית הערבה התיכונה) is a Regional Council in the South District of Israel.

It encompasses eight settlements near the eastern border of Israel, south of the Dead Sea. All settlements are located near Route 90, which is the longest north–south road in Israel.

== Settlements in the council ==
The Central Arava Regional Council comprises five moshavim and three community settlements:

=== Moshavim ===
- Ein Yahav (עין יהב)
- Hatzeva (חצבה)
- Idan (עידן)
- Paran (פארן)
- Tzofar (צופר)

=== Community settlements ===
- Ir Ovot (עיר אובות)
- Sapir (ספיר)
- Tzukim (צוקים)

== Demographics ==
Historical population
Year	Pop.	±%
1972	100	—
1983	900	+800.0%
1995	1,800	+100.0%
2008	2,500	+38.9%
2022	6,089	+143.6%
2024	6,752	+10.9%

== Voting Patterns ==
In the 2022 election, 86 percent of voters in the regional council voted for the parties of the center-left coalition led by Yair Lapid, while 14 percent voted for the parties of the right-wing coalition led by Benjamin Netanyahu and 0.5 percent voted for the Arab parties.

In the 2026 election, 78 percent of voters in the regional council voted for the parties of the center-left coalition led by Gadi Eisenkot, while 14 percent voted for the parties of the right-wing coalition led by Benjamin Netanyahu and 1.5 percent voted for the Arab parties. An additional 4 percent voted for the Reservists, and 1.5 percent voted for Amcha Yisrael. Voter turnout increased 27 percent from the 2022 election.
