= Arabah =

Area south of the Dead Sea basin in Israel and Jordan

Coordinates: 30°25′01″N 35°09′05″E

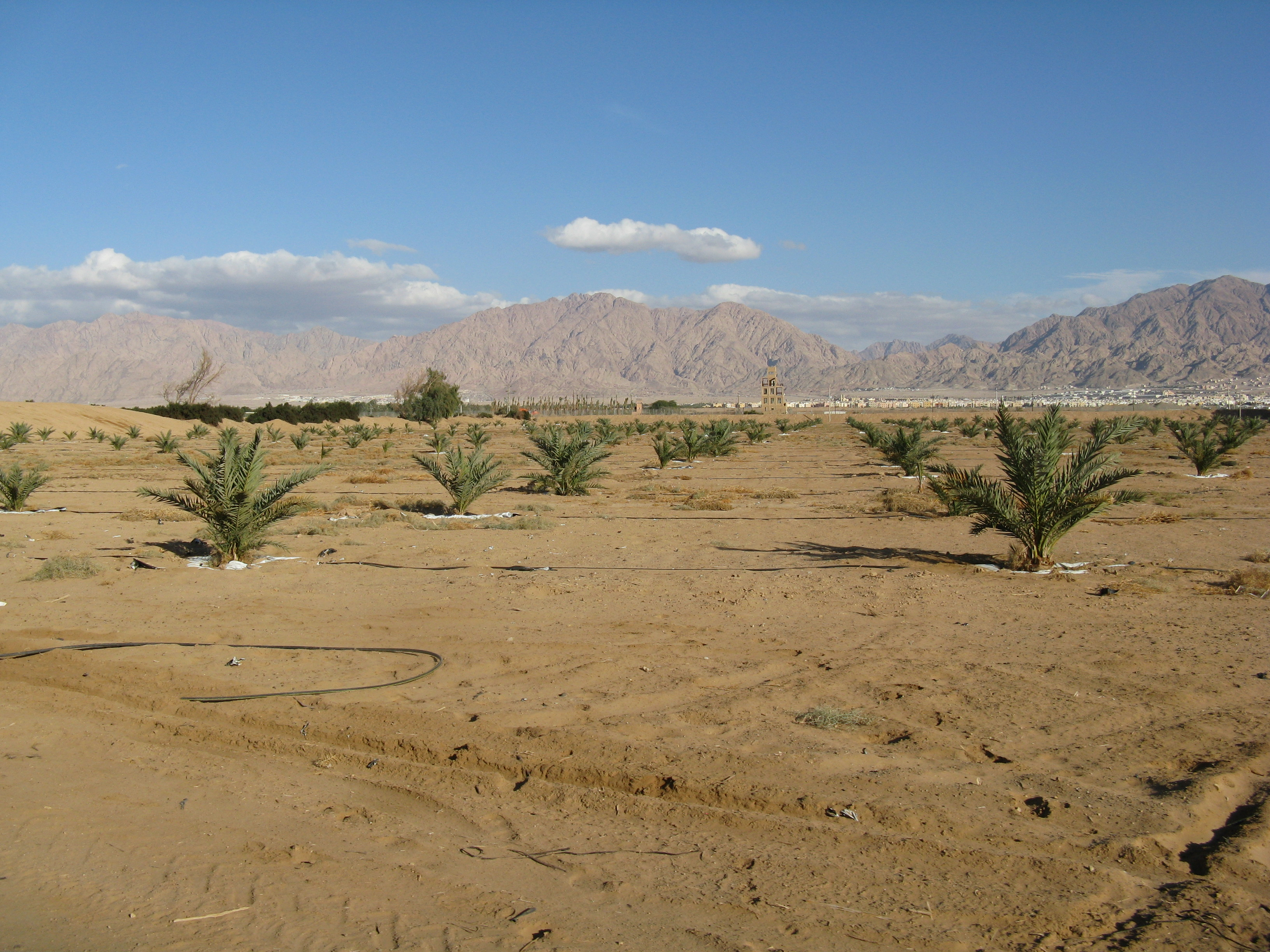
Date palm plantation in the Israeli Arava

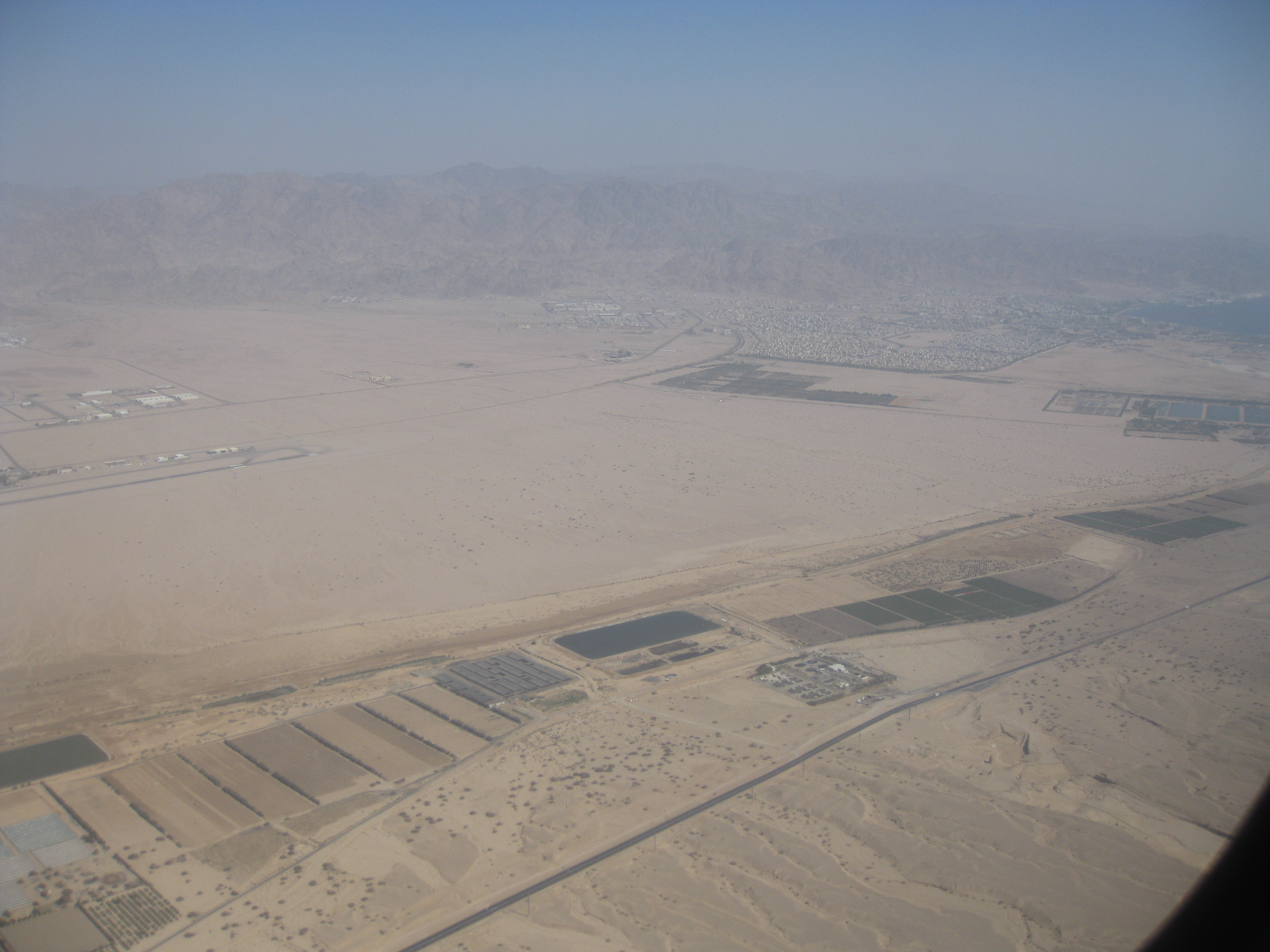
Southern tip of the Arava with King Hussein International Airport, Aqaba and the Gulf of Aqaba seen from Israel

The Arabah/Araba (Arabic: وادي عربة, romanized: Wādī ʿAraba) or Aravah/Arava (Hebrew: הָעֲרָבָה, romanized: hāʿĂrāḇā, lit. 'dry area') is a loosely defined geographic area located south of the Dead Sea drainage basin and north of the Gulf of Aqaba in southeastern Israel and southwestern Jordan.

The old meaning, which was in use up to around the early 20th century, covered almost the entire length of what today is called the Jordan Rift Valley, running in a north–south orientation between the southern end of the Sea of Galilee and the northern tip of the Gulf of Aqaba of the Red Sea at Aqaba–Eilat. This included the Jordan Rift Valley between the Sea of Galilee and the Dead Sea, the Dead Sea itself, and what today is commonly called the Arava Valley. The contemporary use of the term is restricted to this southern section alone.

== Geography ==
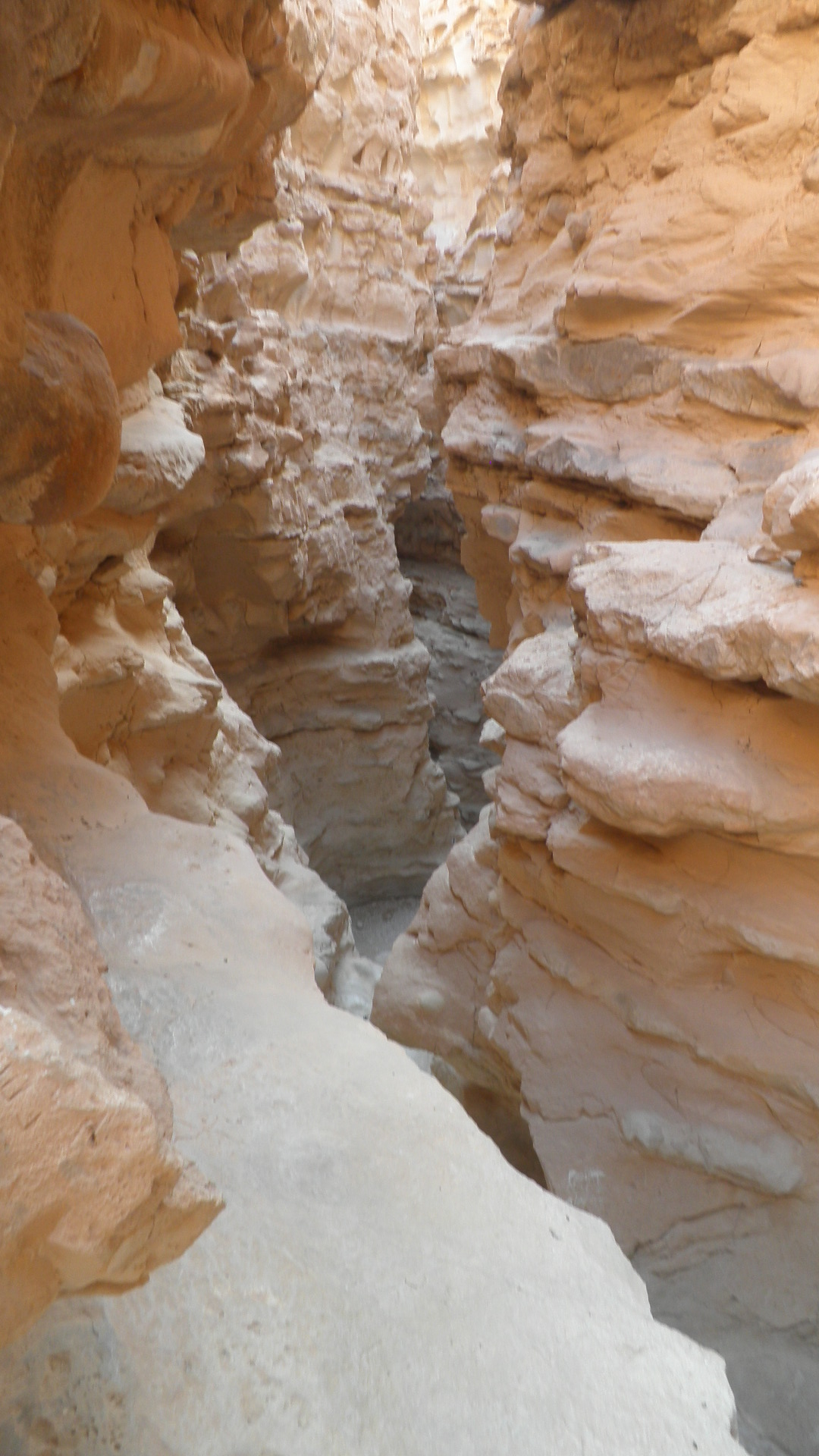
Nahal Barak, in Israel's Southern District, is part of a system of streams draining the Arava desert.

The Arabah is 166 km (103 mi) in length, from the Gulf of Aqaba to the southern shore of the Dead Sea.

Topographically, the region is divided into three sections. From the Gulf of Aqaba northward, the land gradually rises over a distance of 77 km (48 mi), and reaches a height of 230 m (750 ft) above sea level, which represents the watershed divide between the Dead Sea and the Red Sea. From this crest, the land slopes gently northward over the next 74 km (46 mi) to a point 15 km (9.3 mi) south of the Dead Sea. In the last section, the Arabah drops steeply to the Dead Sea, which is 417 m (1,368 ft) below sea level.

The Arabah is scenic with colorful cliffs and sharp-topped mountains. The southern Arabah is hot, dry and virtually without rain.

== Flora and fauna ==
There are numerous species of flora and fauna in the Aravah Valley. Notably the caracal (Caracal caracal) is found on the valley's savanna areas. Acacia trees (genus Vachellia) support several species of large herbivores, including Nubian ibex (Capra nubiana), Arabian oryx (Oryx leucoryx), Asiatic wild ass (Equus hemionus), Dorcas gazelles (Gazella dorcas), and a relict population of Arabian gazelles (Gazella arabica), locally known as acacia gazelles. They are predated and scavenged upon by carnivores including Arabian wolves (Canis lupus arabs), striped hyenas (Hyaena hyaena), and golden jackals (Canis aureus).

=== Important Bird Areas ===
A 15,000 ha (37,000-acre) tract of the northern Arava Valley, from the Ne'ot Hakikar Nature Reserve in the north to the Hazeva and Shezaf Nature Reserve in the south, has been recognised as an Important Bird Area (IBA) by BirdLife International because it supports populations of both resident and migrating bird species, including sand partridges, garganeys, common cranes, black and white storks, Eurasian spoonbills and bitterns, black-winged stilts, desert tawny owls, lappet-faced vultures, Levant sparrowhawks, sooty falcons, Arabian warblers and babblers, Tristram's starlings, hooded wheatears and Dead Sea sparrows.

Furthermore, a 60,000 ha (150,000-acre) tract of the southern Arava Valley, from Yotvata in the north to the Gulf of Aqaba in the south, including the western (Israeli) half of the valley floor and the ridge of the Eilat Mountains, has also been recognised as an IBA, with additional significant species being Lichtenstein's sandgrouse, grey herons, great white pelicans, slender-billed curlews, marsh sandpipers, black-winged pratincoles, white-eyed gulls, white-winged terns, pallid scops owls, European honey buzzards, Egyptian vultures, eastern imperial eagles, lesser kestrels, lanner falcons, Arabian larks, Sinai rosefinches and cinereous buntings. On the eastern (Jordanian) side of the southern Arava Valley is the corresponding, 17,200 ha (43,000-acre), Wadi Araba IBA, about 160 km (99 mi) long by up to 25 km (16 mi) wide. An additional species recorded there is the vulnerable MacQueen's bustard, in very small numbers.

== History ==
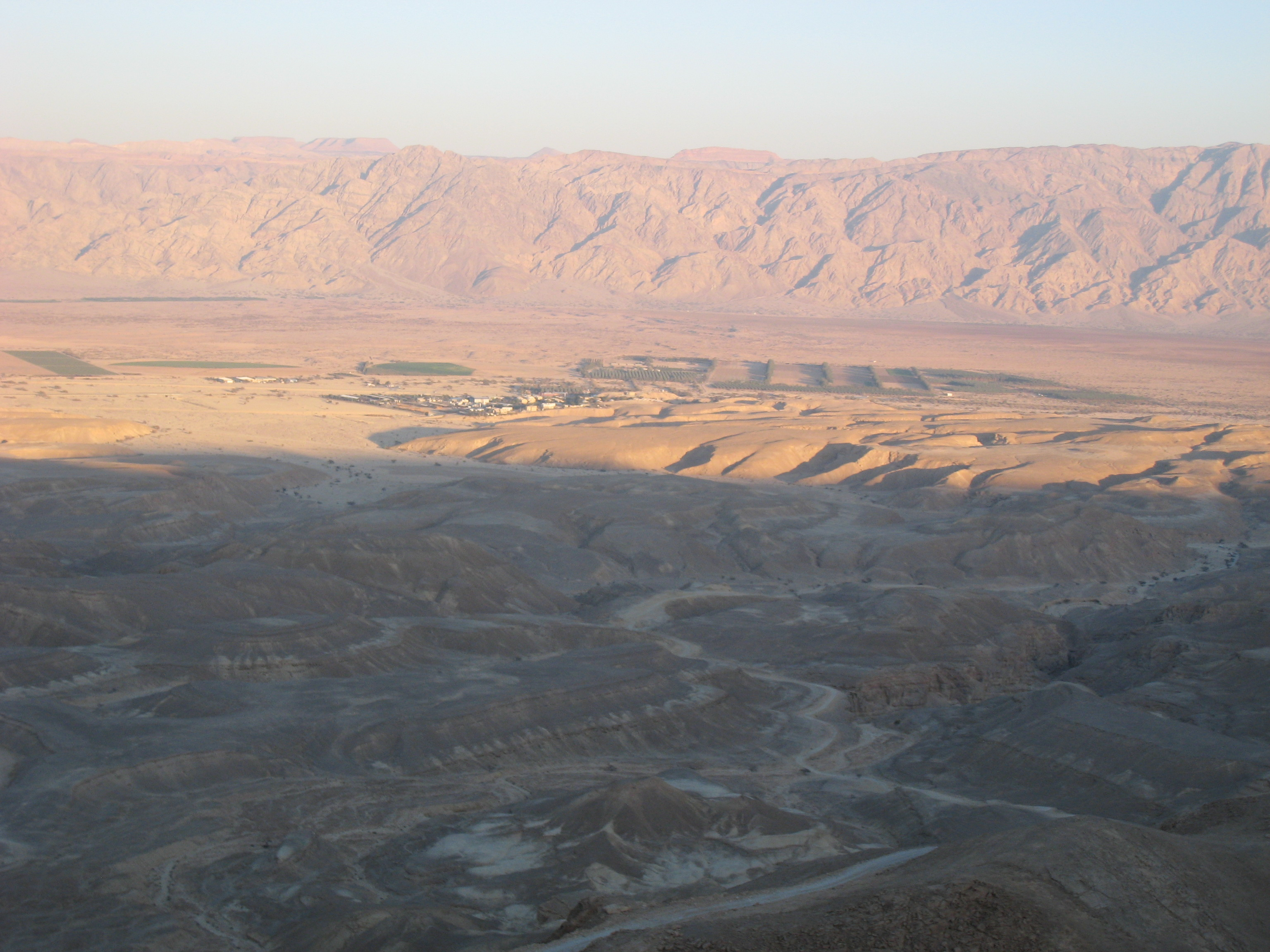
Wadi Arabah and the Edom Mountains in Jordan, seen from Israel

=== Bronze and Iron Ages; Nabatean period ===
In the Bronze and Iron Ages, the Arava was a center of copper production. King Solomon is reported in the Hebrew Bible to have had mines in this area. Copper mining at the Ashalim site predates his reign in the 10th century BCE. The Arabah, especially its eastern part, was part of the realm of the Edomites (called "Idumeans" during Hellenistic and Roman times). Later the eastern Arabah became the domain of the Nabateans, the builders of the city of Petra.

==== Archaeology: Kingdom of Edom ====
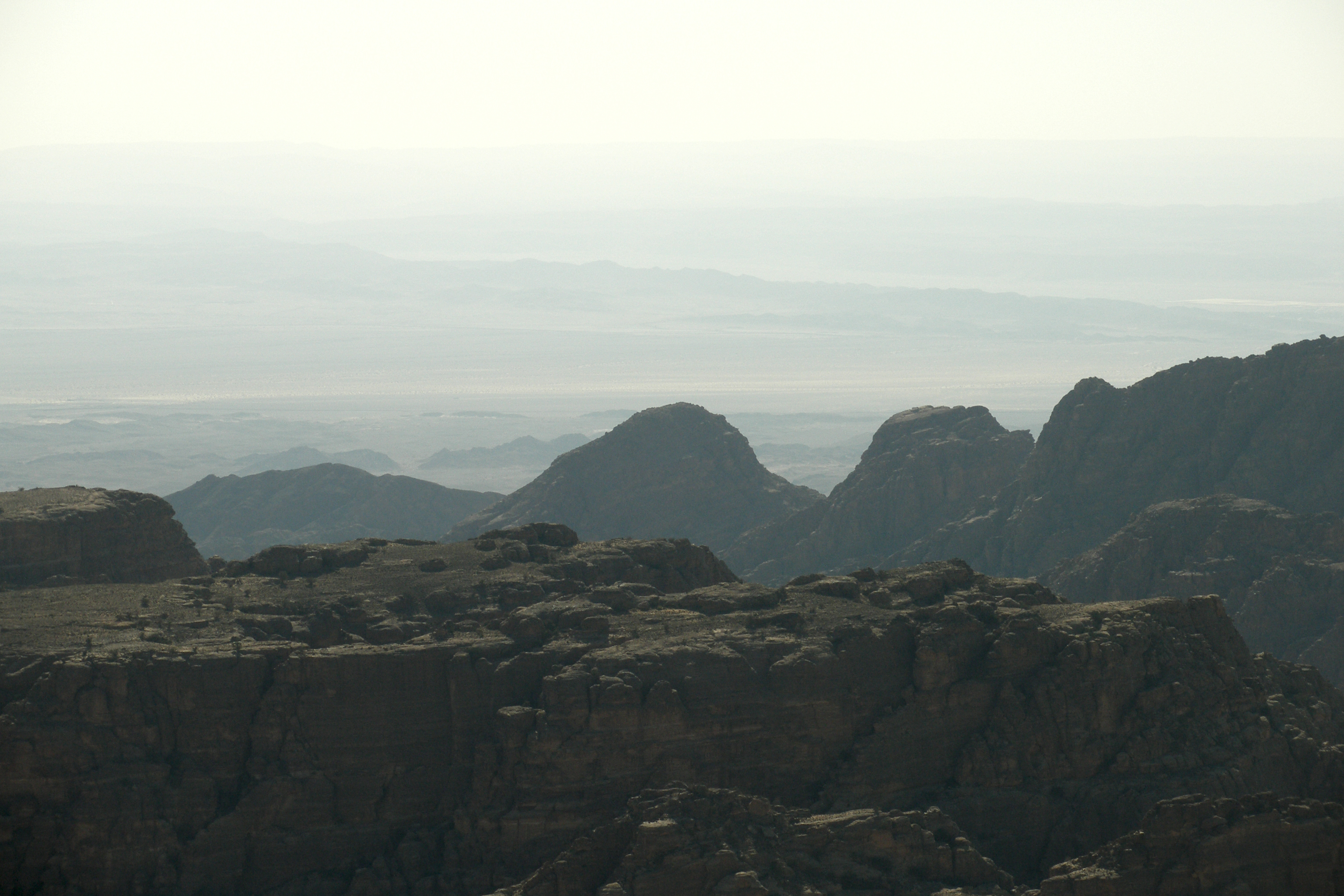
View over Wadi Arabah from peaks of Wadi Musa

The existence of the biblical Kingdom of Edom was proved by archaeologists led by Erez Ben-Yosef and Tom Levy, using a methodology called the punctuated equilibrium model in 2019. Archaeologists mainly took copper samples from the Timna Valley and Faynan in Jordan's Arava valley dated to 1300–800 BCE. According to the results of the analyses, the researchers thought that Pharaoh Shoshenk I of Egypt (the Biblical "Shishak"), who attacked Jerusalem in the 10th century BC, encouraged trade and production of copper instead of destroying the region. Tel Aviv University professor Ben-Yosef reported, "Our new findings contradict the view of many archaeologists that the Arava was populated by a loose alliance of tribes, and they're consistent with the biblical story that there was an Edomite kingdom here".

=== Israel and Jordan, 20th-21st c. ===
The Israel–Jordan Peace Treaty was signed in the Arava on October 26, 1994. The governments of Jordan and Israel promoted development of the region. There was a plan to bring sea water from the Red Sea to the Dead Sea through a canal (Red Sea–Dead Sea Water Conveyance), which follows along the Arabah. This (long envisioned) project was once an issue of dispute between Jordan and Israel, but it was agreed that the project shall be constructed on and by the Jordanian side. In 2021, the project was abandoned by Jordan.

Arava Peace Road

The Peace Road, which starts in Moshav Idan and continues south to Ein Yahav, offers scenic contrasts: on the one hand the open desert, white marl hills, and the hills of the tongue formation, and on the other hand, the well-kept agricultural plots of Araba residents.

Central-and Northern-Arava Research and Development

R&D activity in the Arava Valley began in 1986 under the Negev-Arava R&D framework, with the goal of meeting the new settlements' developmental demands, as they were formally designated as high priority areas along Israel's border.

Park Sapir

Sapir Park is a recreational park in the Arava region that was developed around a groundwater-fed lake that was discovered in the 1980s. The lake covers about 3,000 square meters and includes fishing areas, a boardwalk, a recirculating stream, and grassy banks. The park also contains a sculpture garden and approximately 60 baobab trees.

== Population and localities ==
=== Israel ===
==== Demography ====
The Israeli population of the region is 52,000, of whom 47,500 live in Eilat (52,753 in 2021), and just over 5,000 live in 20 small towns north of Eilat, the largest of which is Yotvata, with a population (as of 2019) of 717 (735 in 2021). Eilat is a city, while all other towns are communal settlements of the kibbutz, moshav and community settlement type.

==== Localities ====
Below is a list of Israeli localities in the Arava, from north to south. They belong to one city council, Eilat, and three regional councils: Tamar (a), Central Arava (b), and Hevel Eilot (c), all part of the Southern District.

- Moshav Ein Tamar (a)
- Moshav Neot HaKikar (a)
- Ir Ovot, community settlement (b)
- Moshav Idan (b)
- Moshav Ein Hatzeva (a)
- Moshav Hatzeva (b)
- Moshav Ein Yahav (b)
- Sapir, community settlement (b)
- Moshav Tzofar (b)
- Tzukim, community settlement (b)
- Moshav Paran (b)
- Kibbutz Yahel (c)
- Kibbutz Neot Smadar (c)
- Kibbutz Neve Harif (c)
- Kibbutz Lotan (c)
- Kibbutz Ketura (c)
- Kibbutz Grofit (c)
- Kibbutz Yotvata (c)
- Kibbutz Samar (c)
- Kibbutz Elifaz (c)
- Be'er Ora, community settlement (c)
- Kibbutz Eilot (c)
- Eilat

=== Jordan ===
==== Demography ====
The total Jordanian population in the region is 103,000, of whom 96,000 live in Aqaba (95,048 as of 2021).

In 2004, the Jordanian administrative district of Wadi Araba had a population of 6,775.

Five major Bedouin tribes comprise eight settlements on the Jordanian side: Al-S'eediyeen (السعيديين), Al-Ihewat (الإحيوات), Al-Ammareen/Amareen (العمارين; see also Palestinian Bedouin), Al-Rashaideh/Rashaydeh (الرشايدة; see also Palestinian Bedouin), and Al-Azazmeh (العزازمة), as well as smaller tribes of the Al-Oseifat (العصيفات), Al-Rawajfeh (الرواجفة), Al-Manaja'h (المناجعة), and Al-Marzaqa (المرزقة), among others. The main economic activities for these Arabah residents revolve around herding sheep, agriculture, handicrafts, and serving in the Jordanian Army.

==== Localities ====
Below is a list of Jordanian population clusters in Wadi Araba:

- Aqaba
- Feifa
- Safi
- Al Mazraa

== Landmarks ==
Timna Valley Park is notable for its prehistoric rock carvings, some of the oldest copper mines in the world, and a convoluted cliff called King Solomon's pillars. On the Jordanian side is Wadi Rum, famous among rock climbers, hikers, campers, and lovers of the outdoors. There is the Jordanian copper mining area of Wadi Feynan, including the site of Khirbat en-Nahas, corresponding to the one from Timna Valley in the west.

Feynan Ecolodge was opened in Wadi Feynan by the Royal Society for the Conservation of Nature in 2005.

== See also ==
- Arava Institute for Environmental Studies, academic program in Israel
- Nahal HaArava, a wadi in the northern part of the Arava
- Negev
- Sands of Samar, an expanse of sand dunes in the southern Arava
- Southern District (Israel)
- Wadi Araba Crossing, southernmost border crossing between Jordan and Israel
