= Ein Yahav =

Moshav in southern Israel

Ein Yahav: עין יהב (Hebrew)
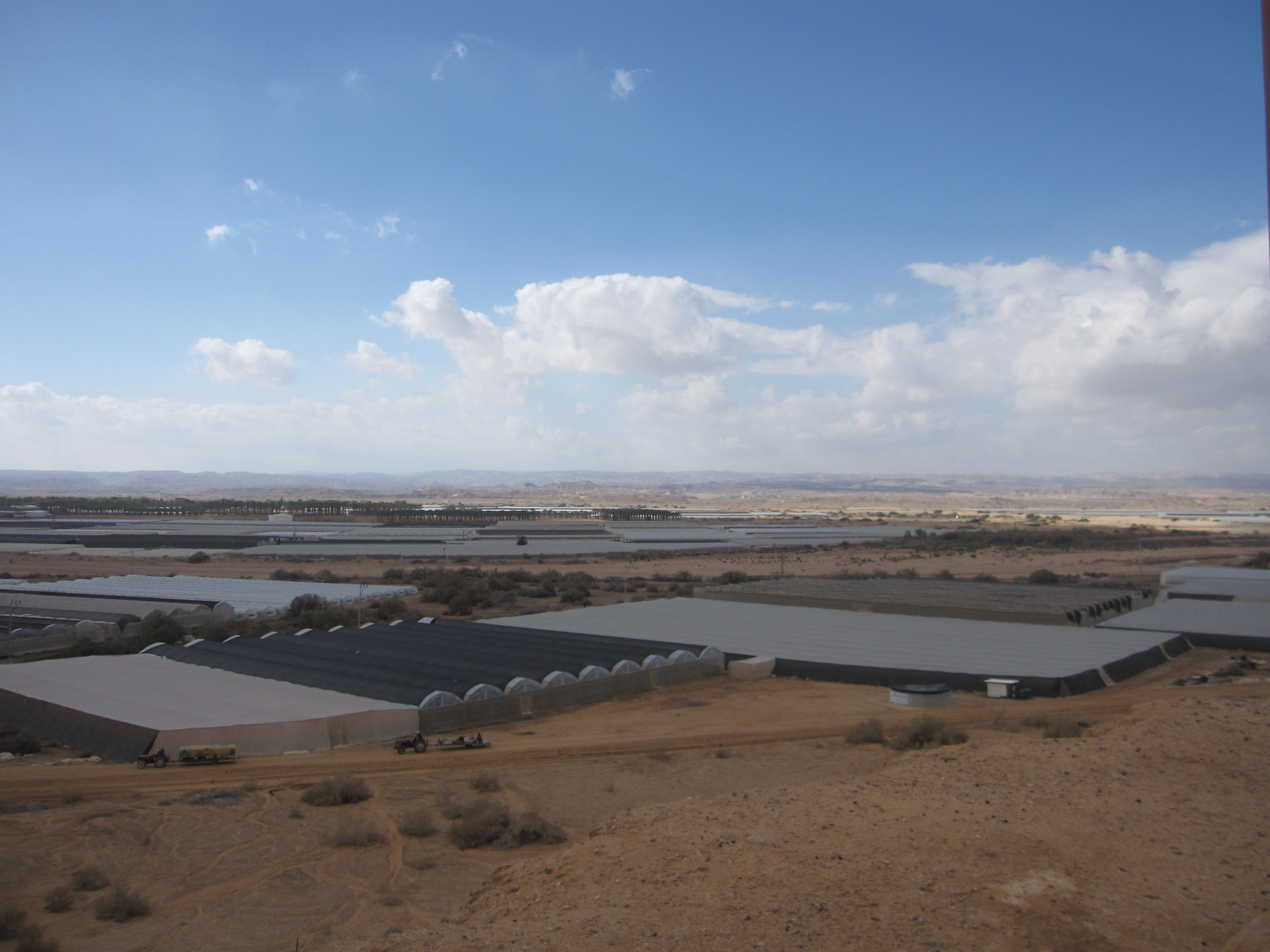
- Etymology: Yahav Spring
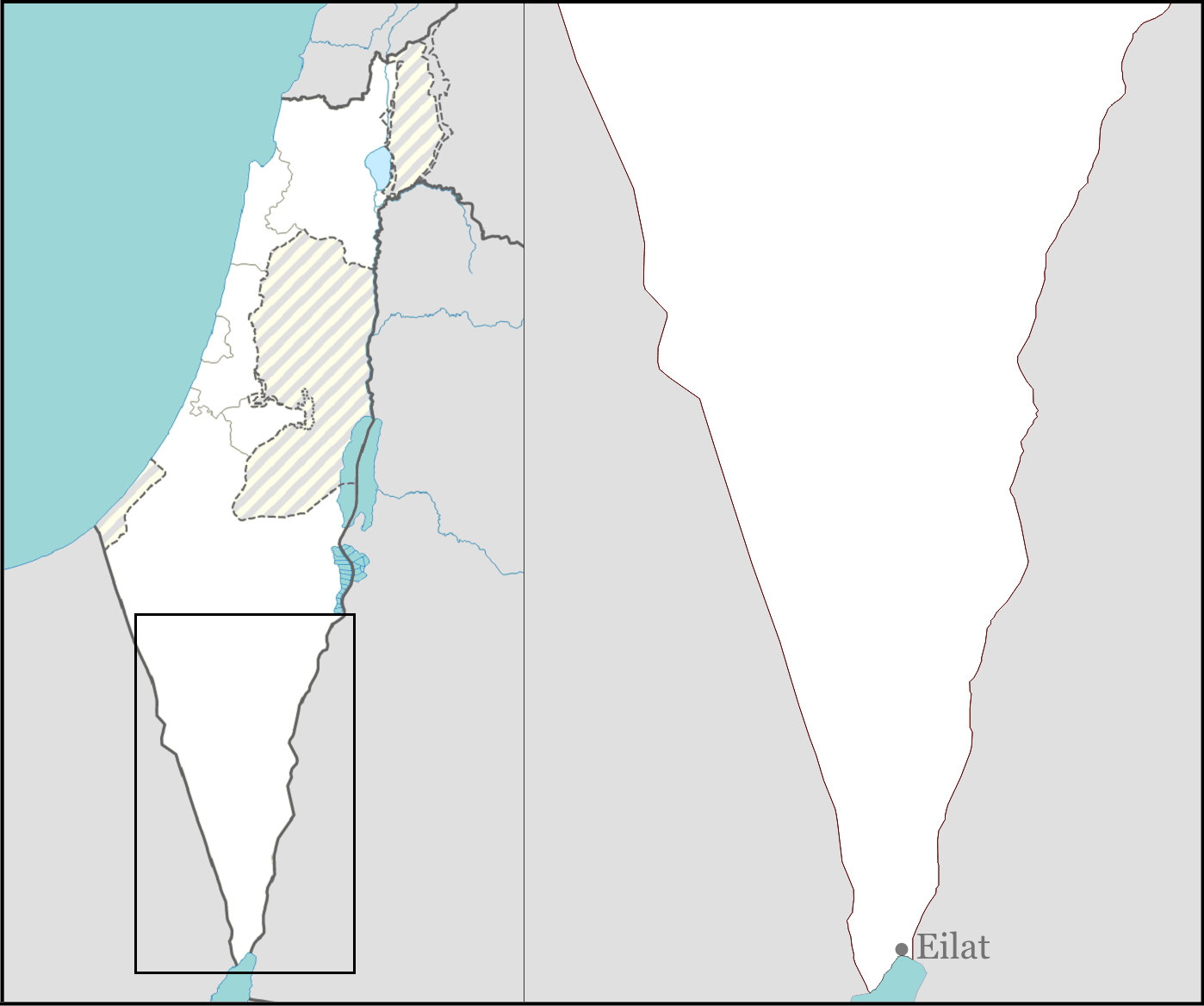
- Location within Southern Negev region of Israel Location within Israel
- Coordinates: 30°39′31″N 35°14′12″E
- Country: Israel
- District: Southern
- Subdistrict: Beersheba
- Council: Central Arava
- Affiliation: Moshav Movement
- Founded: 1962
- Founder: Veteran moshav members
- Population (2024): 1,654

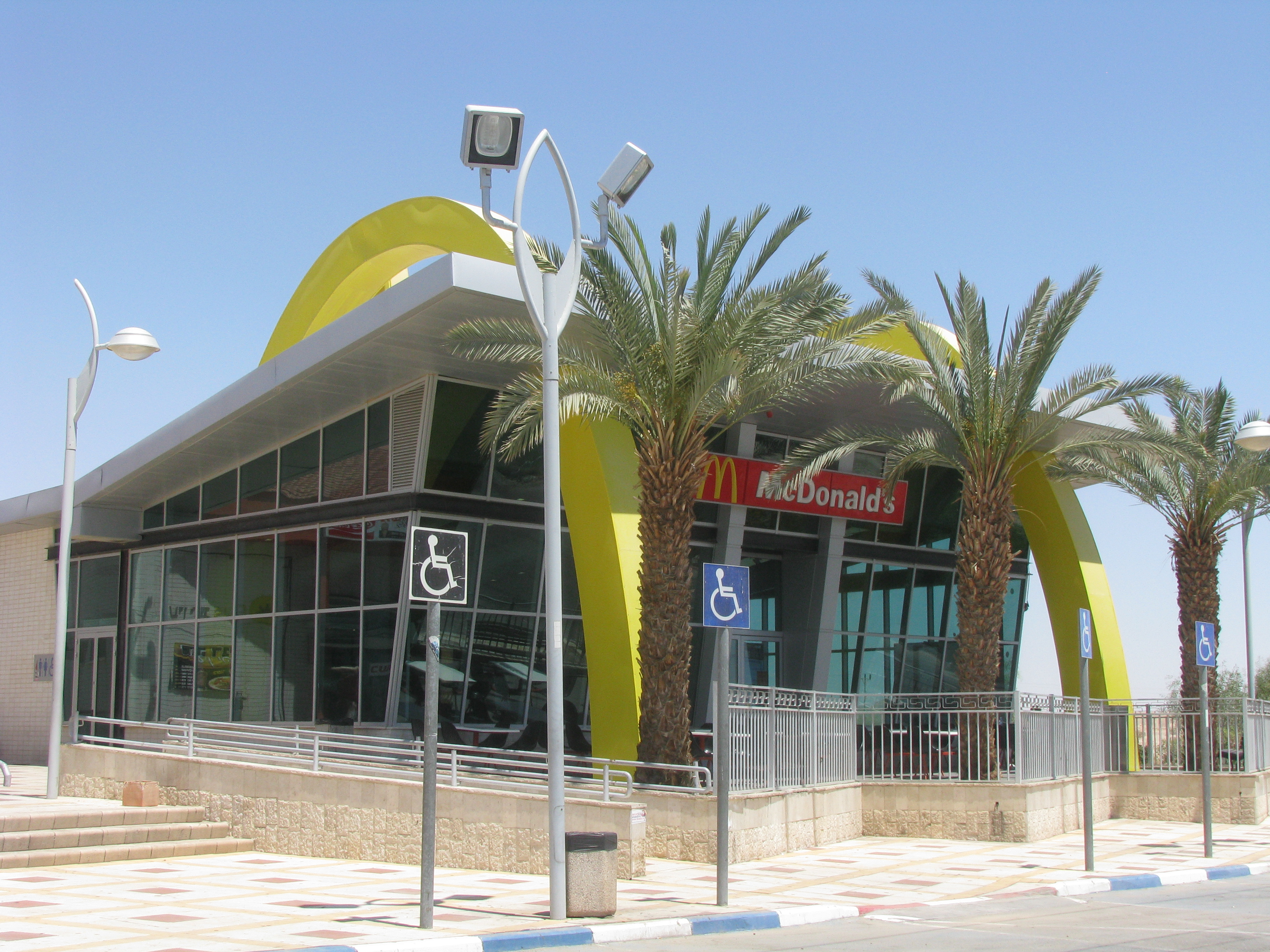
McDonald's at Ein Yahav

Ein Yahav (Hebrew: עין יהב, lit. 'Yahav Spring') is a moshav in southern Israel. Located 100 m below sea level in the northern Arava valley, 12 km south of Hatzeva and between the Yahav and Nikrot streams, it falls under the jurisdiction of the Central Arava Regional Council. In 2024, it has a population of 1,654.

== Etymology ==
Moshav Ein Yahav, lit. 'Yahav Spring', is named after the spring located southwest of the moshav.

== History ==
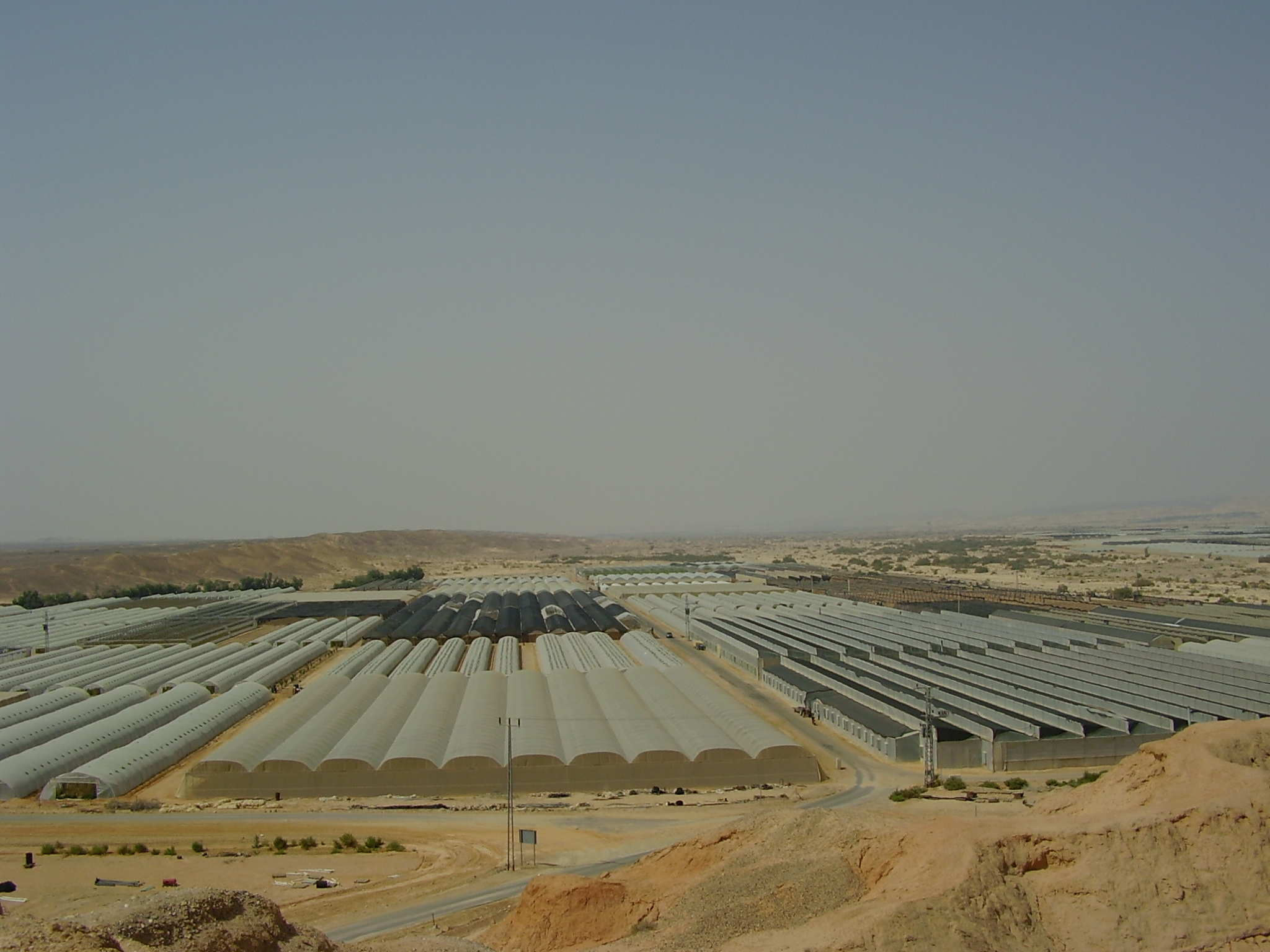
Ein Yahav greenhouses

In 1950, an agricultural experimentation station was set up at Ein Yahav by members of Shahal, a movement to settle arid areas of Israel. The station was abandoned and on 7 October 1953, Israel Defense Forces veterans settled there. In 1959, a Nahal settlement was established 5 km to the east of the original. In 1962, it was civilianized by senior moshavniks and in 1967, the settlement moved to its current location. Ein-Yahav has an airfield nearby (Airport Code: EIY).

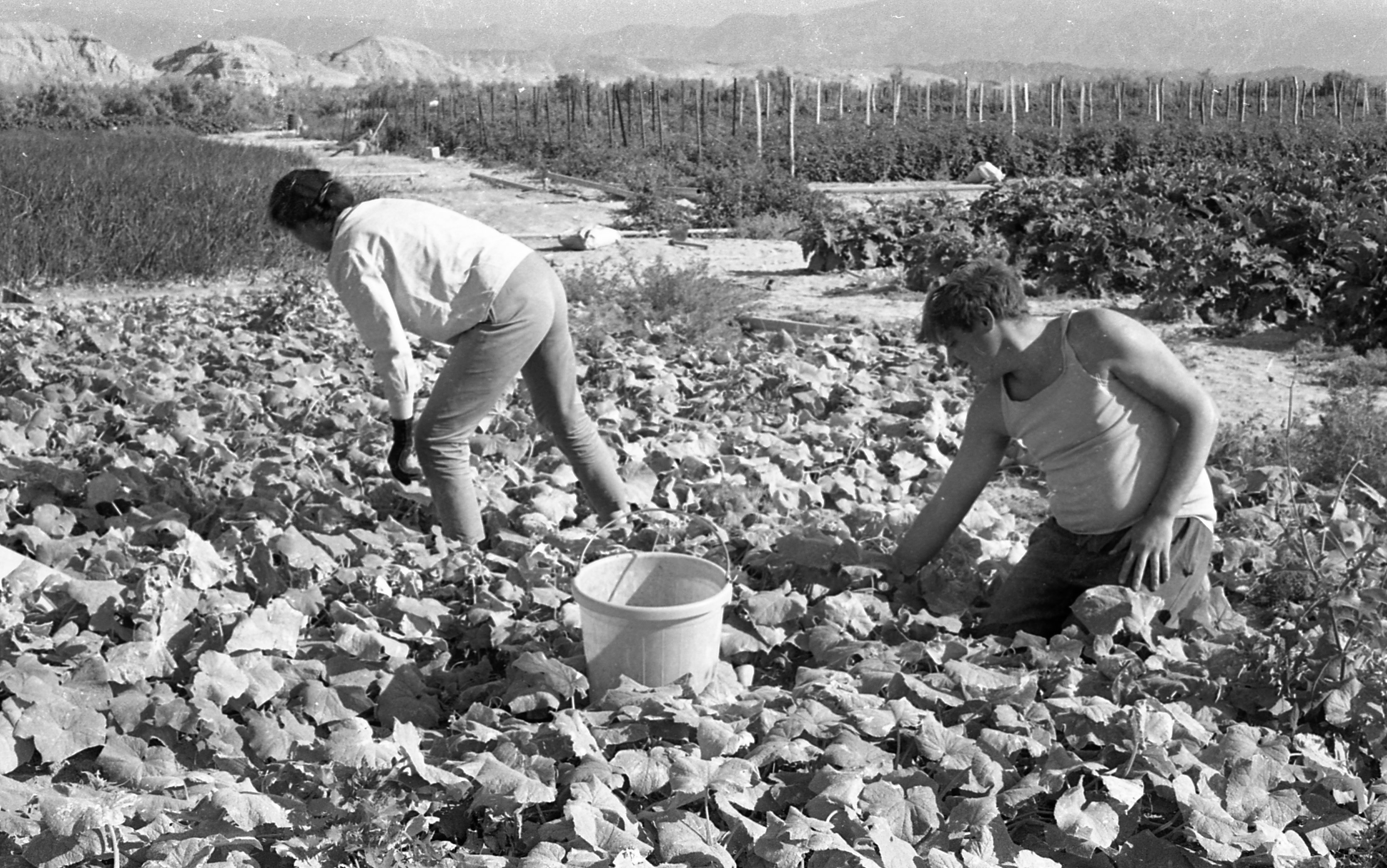
Ein Yahav 1969

Ein Yahav has developed chocolate-colored peppers that combine the nutritional benefits of red and green peppers.

== Archaeology ==
There is an ancient copper-smelting site near Ein Yahav. A small hill with blackened slopes, covered mainly by crushed copper slag, identify the remains of the smelting devices used at the end of the Early Bronze Age for smelting copper.
