= Paran, Israel =

Place in the Southern District, Israel

Paran: פארן (Hebrew)
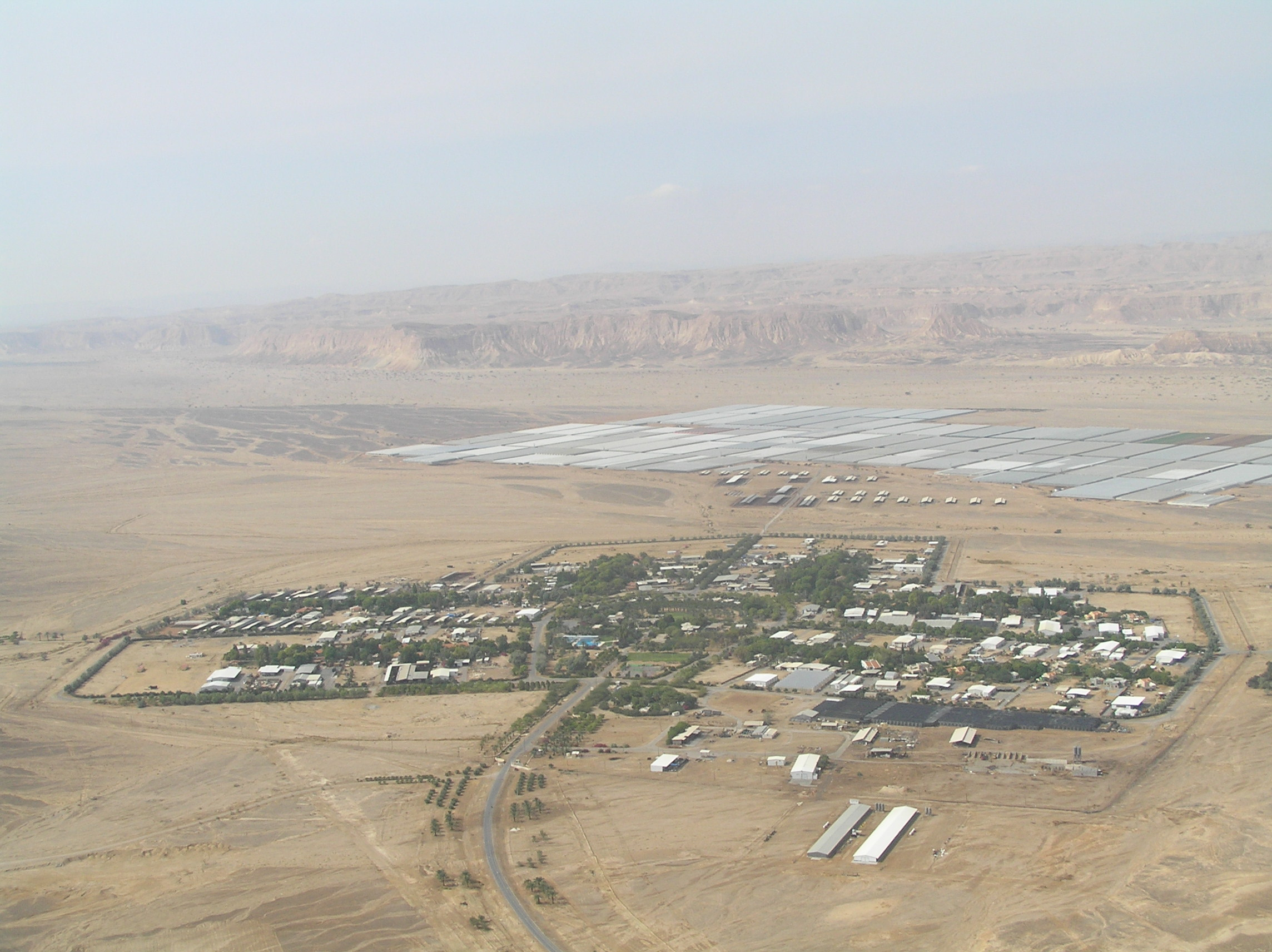
- View of Paran

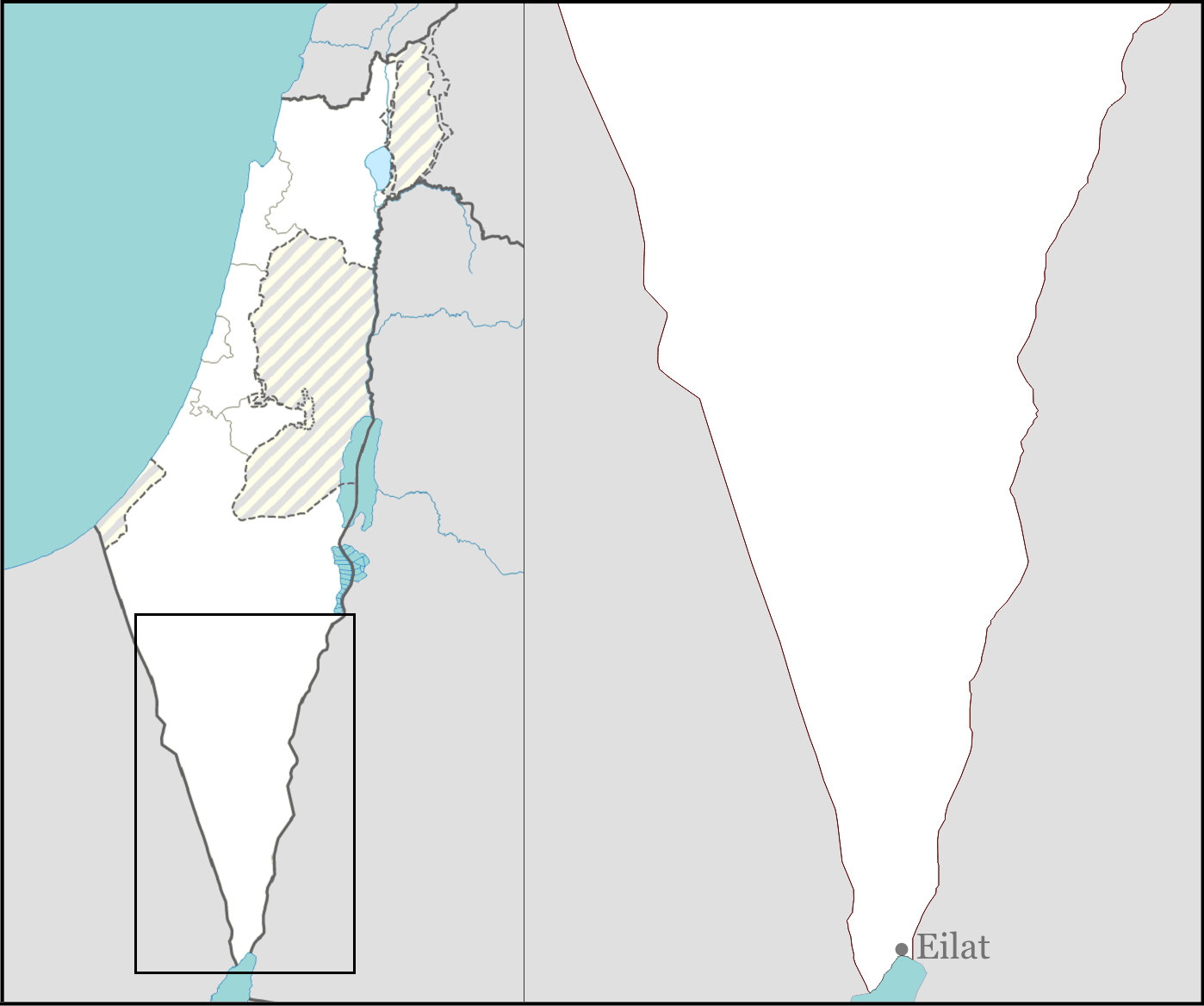
- Location within Southern Negev region of Israel Location within Israel
- Coordinates: 30°21′47″N 35°9′13″E
- Country: Israel
- District: Southern
- Subdistrict: Beersheba
- Council: Central Arava
- Affiliation: Moshavim Movement
- Founded: 1971
- Founder: Nahal
- Population (2024): 1,145

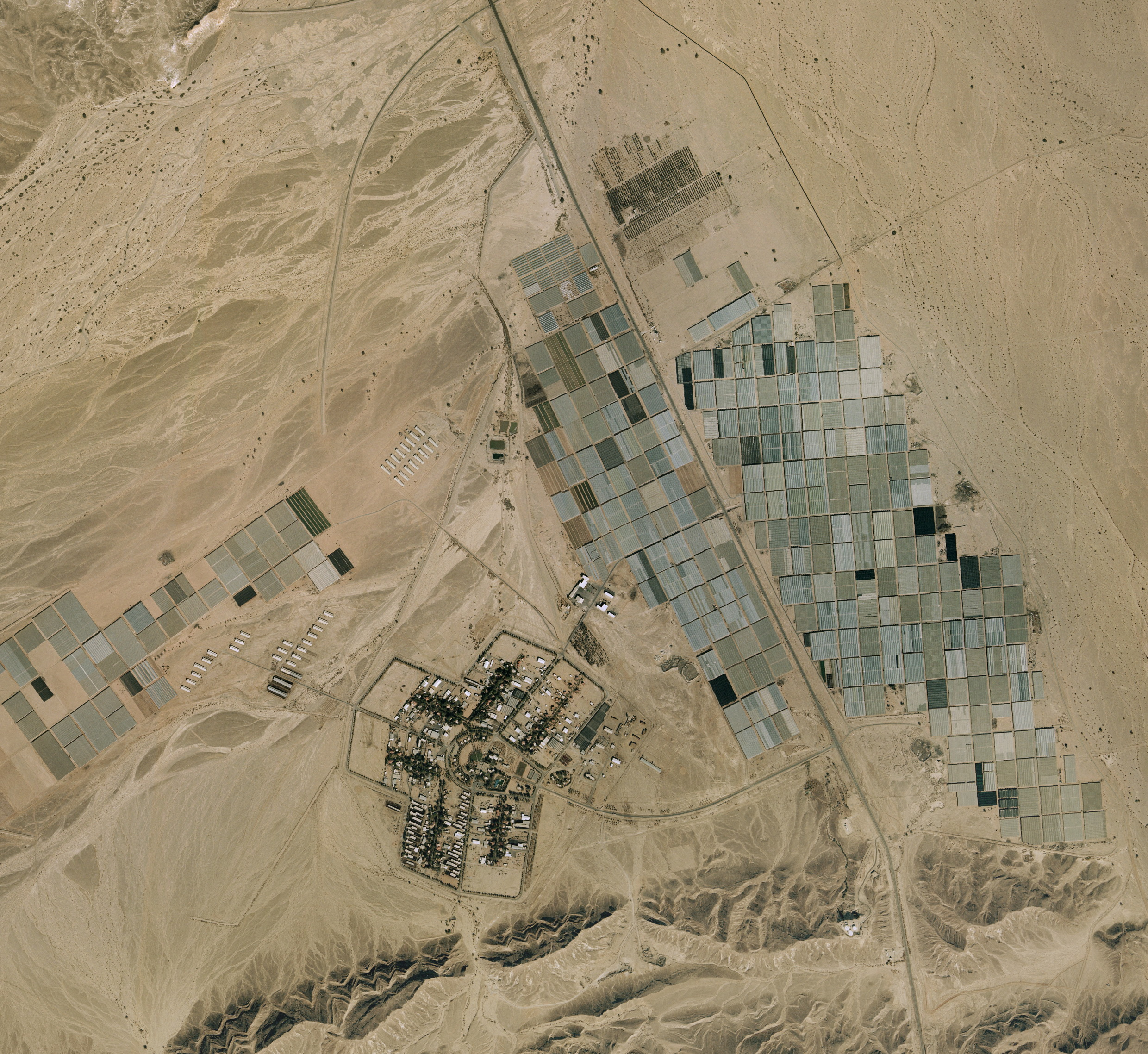
Aerial view

Paran (Hebrew: פארן) is a moshav in southern Israel. Located in the Arava valley around 100 km north of Eilat, it falls under the jurisdiction of Central Arava Regional Council. In 2024 it had a population of 1,145.

== History ==
The moshav is named after a passage in the Book of Genesis (21:20–21): "And God was with the lad, and he grew, and dwelt in the wilderness, and became an archer. And he dwelt in the wilderness of Paran. And his mother took him a wife out of the land of Egypt."

== Economy ==
Each of the family farm units covers 50 dunams (50,000 m^{2}). The main crops are high quality peppers and flowers for export. In addition, 14 of the families run a cowshed of 40-45 dairy cows each. Among the smaller farm branches are a date palm orchard and turkey production.

Some families supplement their income with other activities such as a horseback riding school, a nursery for vegetable and flower seedlings, cottage industries producing arts and crafts articles, and jeep tours.

In 2008 new rules in Israel made solar power profitable. Some families started to produce electricity (commercially) from 50 kWp photovoltaic power plants (per family), using the area's high daily solar radiation and dry weather.

== Services ==
The moshav offers its members a variety of community services including a kindergarten, nursery, members' club, youth club, swimming pool, garage, fitness, public gardens and a well-stocked library, minimarket.
