= Hatzeva =

Moshav in southern Israel

Hatzeva: חצבה (Hebrew)
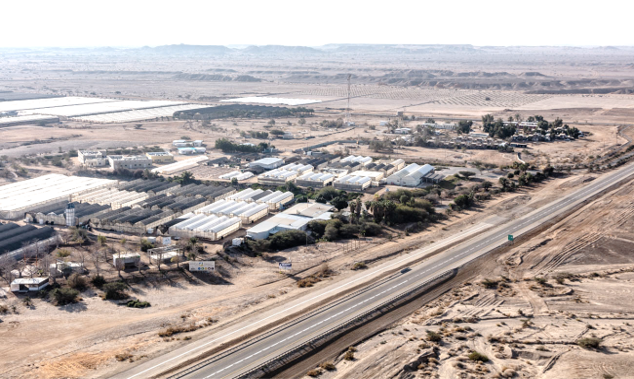

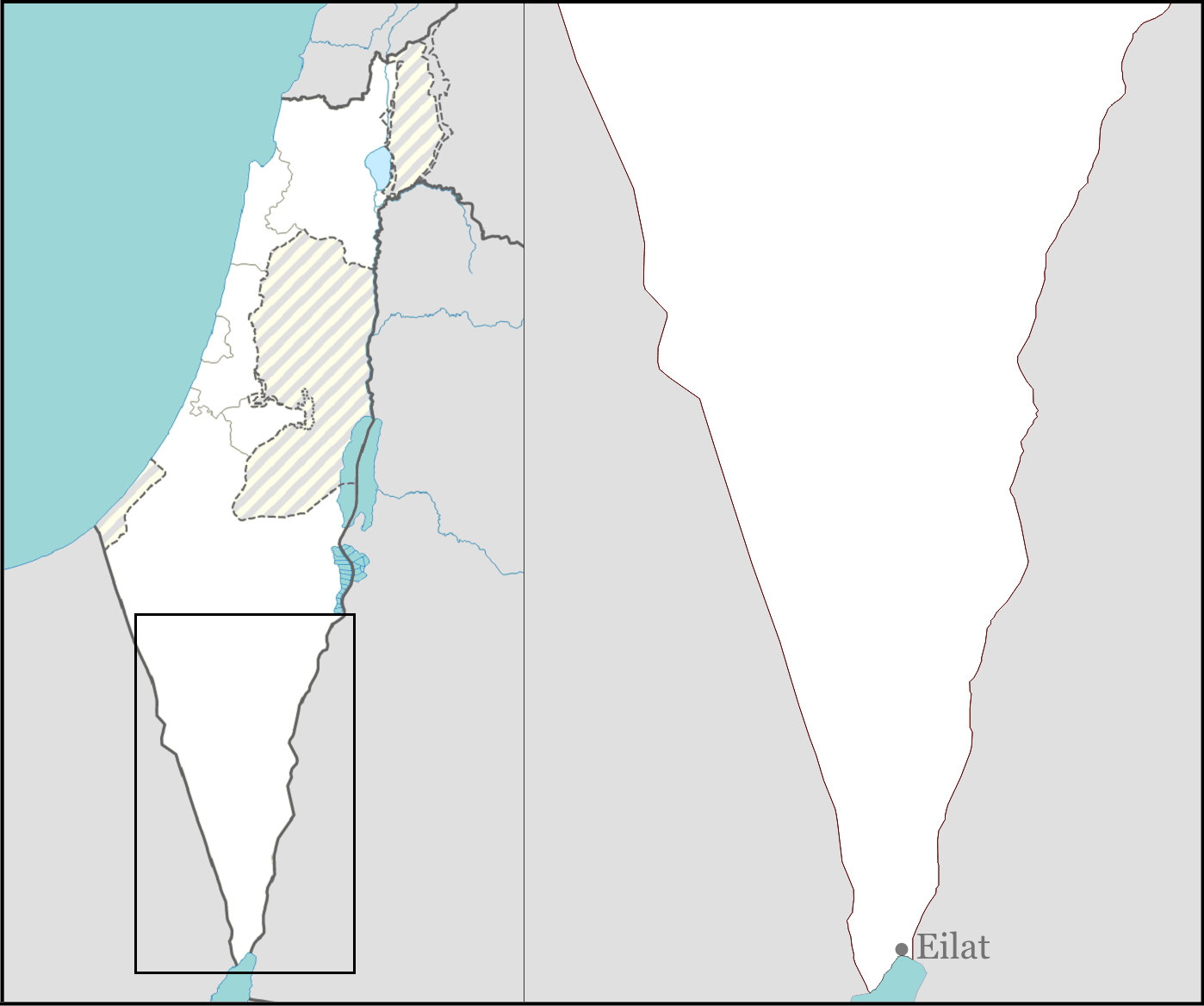
- Location within Southern Negev region of Israel Location within Israel
- Coordinates: 30°46′4″N 35°16′49″E
- Country: Israel
- District: Southern
- Subdistrict: Beersheba
- Council: Central Arava
- Affiliation: Moshavim movement
- Founded: 1968
- Population (2024): 1,297

Hatzeva (Hebrew: חצבה) is a moshav in southern Israel. Located in the Arava valley, 12 km north of Ein Yahav, it falls under the jurisdiction of Central Arava Regional Council. In 2024 it had a population of 1,297.

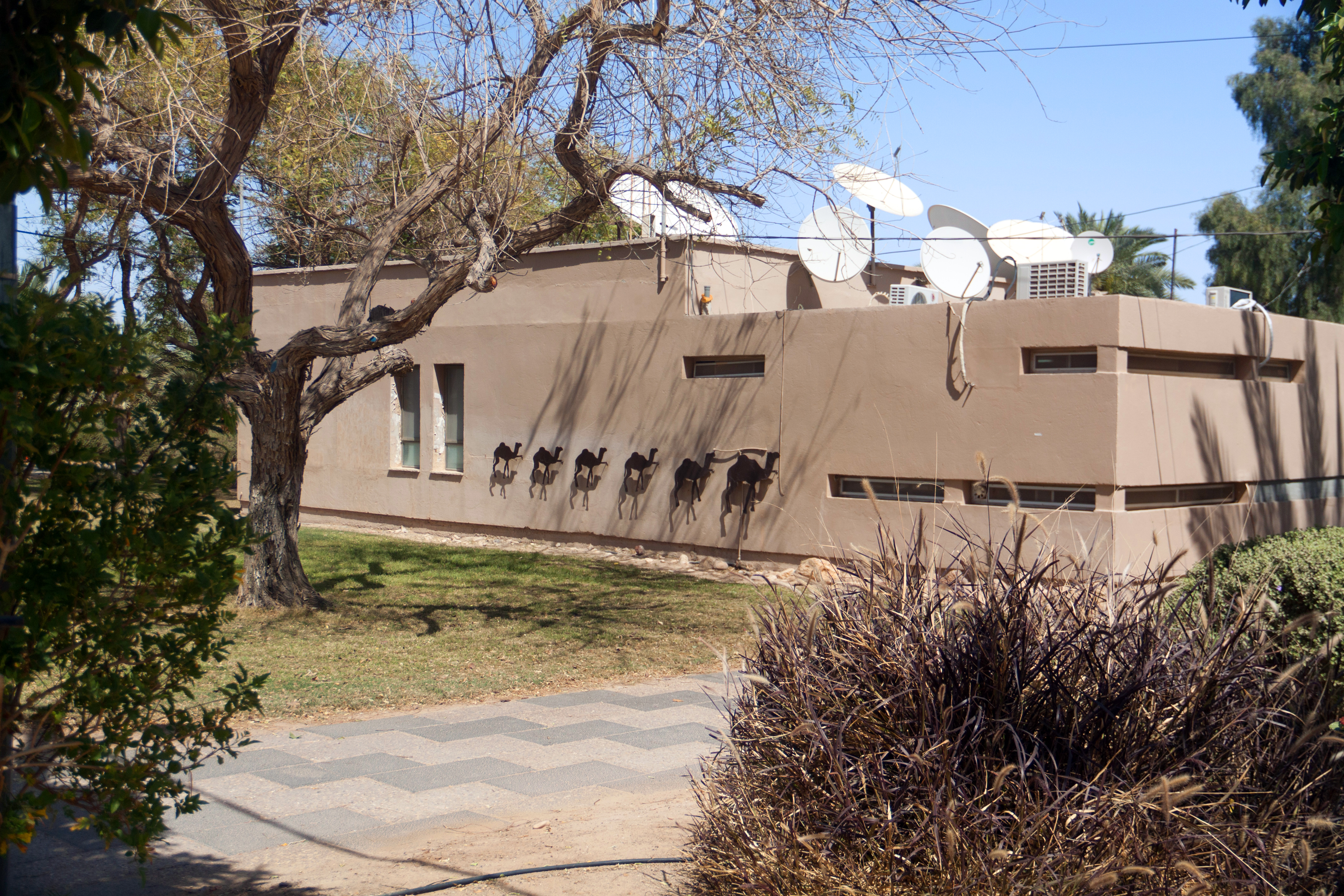
Hatzeva library

== History ==
=== Antiquity ===
The nearby Ein Hazeva archaeological site holds remains of two Judahite fortresses, a Nabataean caravanserai, and a Roman fort, part of the Limes Arabicus. It took advantage of the Spring of Hazeva (in Hebrew Ein Hazeva); for more see Ein Hatzeva, the modern settlement by the name.

=== State of Israel ===
Hatzeva was founded in 1965 as a Nahal settlement near the Arava Road and became a moshav in 1968. It was named after the nearby Hatzeva Fortress. In 1971 its location changed slightly. Near the moshav's access road lies the Hatzeva field school (Gidron), located where the moshav was until 1971. Hashomer Hachadash is a grassroots movement in Hatzeva established to help Israeli farmers and ranchers safeguard their land.

== See also ==
- Israel Goodovitch, architect who designed the hexagonal prefab housing system used in Hatzeva field school in the early 1970s
