= Sapir, Israel =

Sapir: ספיר (Hebrew)
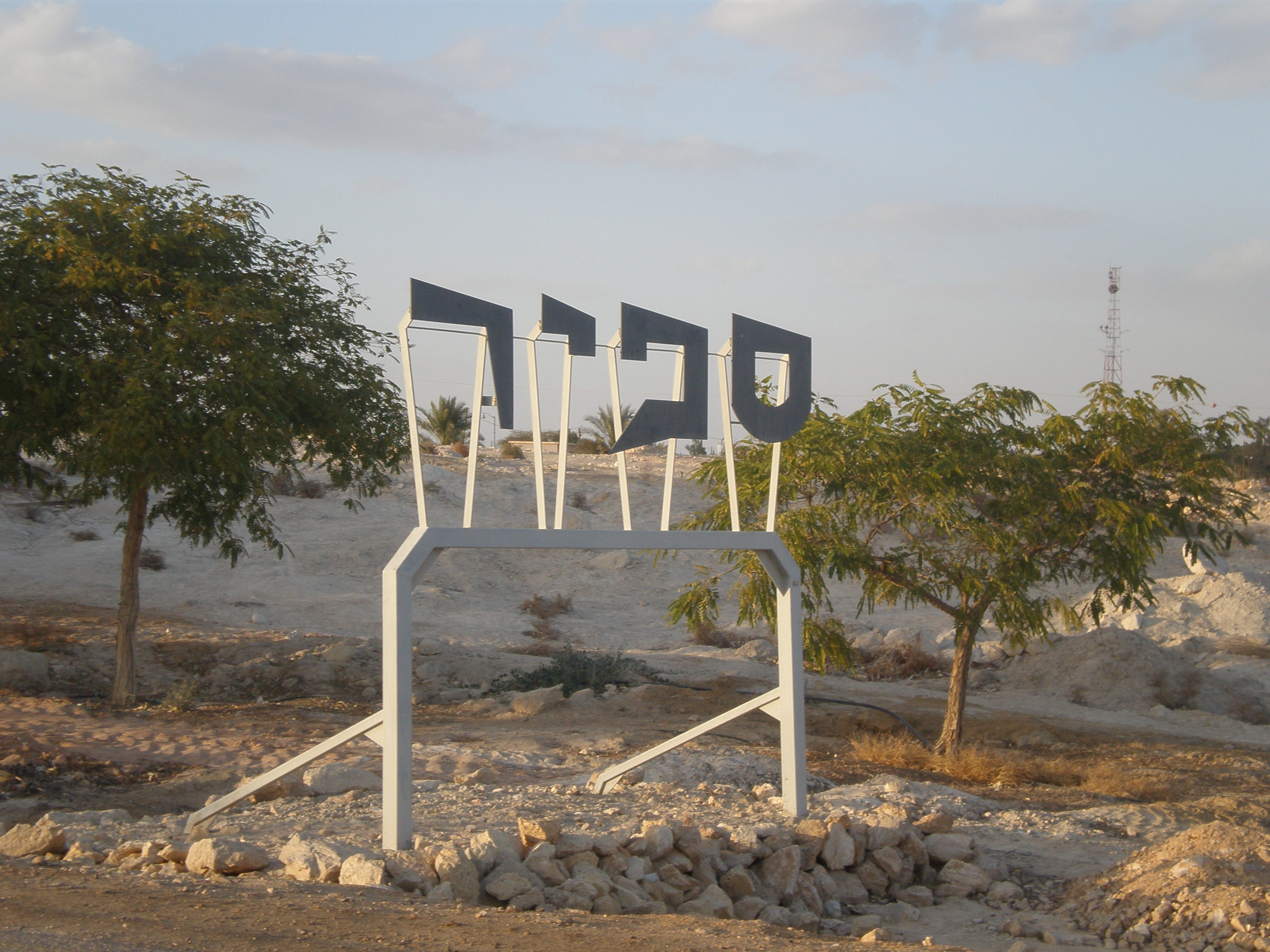

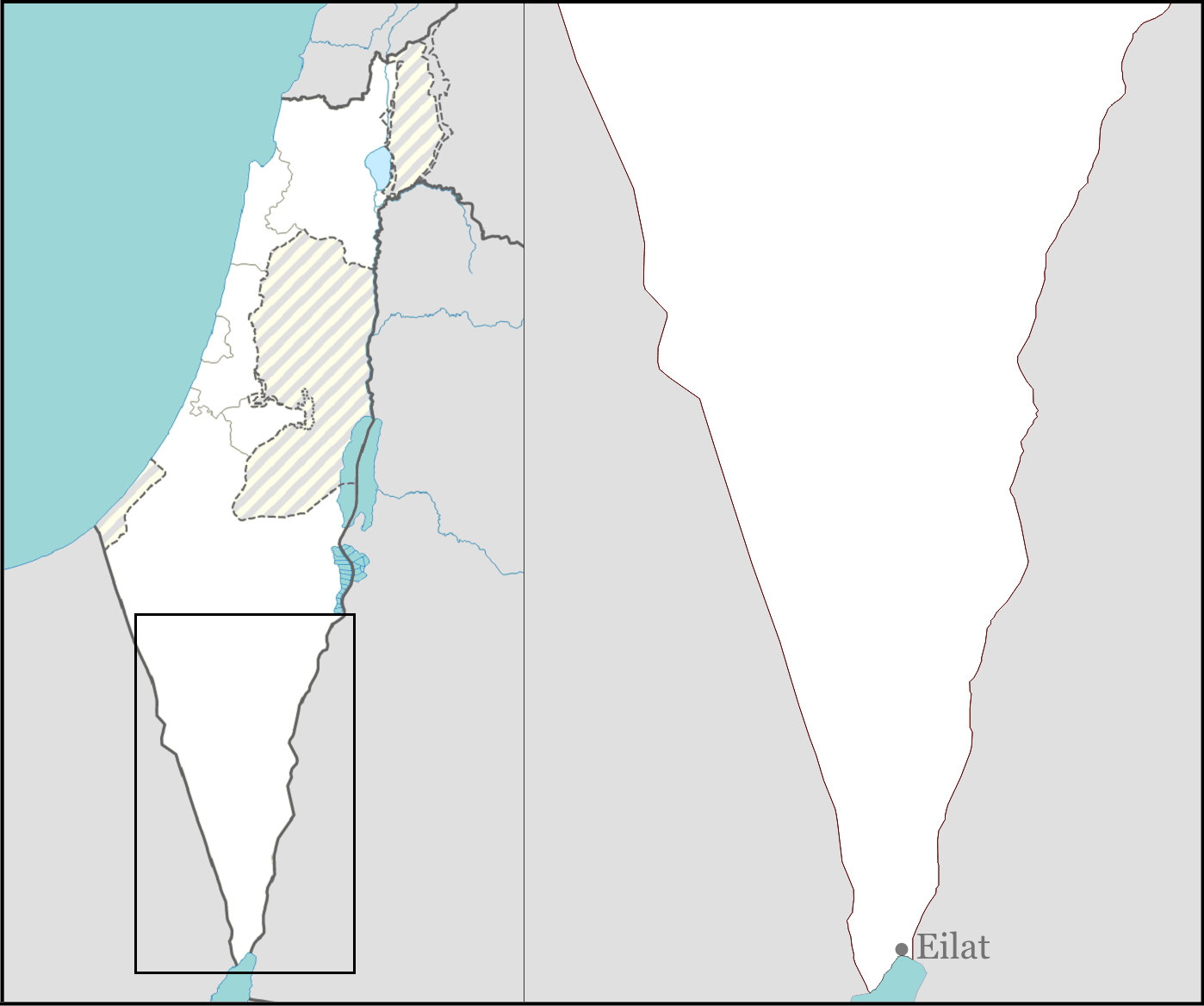
- Location within Southern Negev region of Israel Location within Israel
- Coordinates: 30°36′50″N 35°11′3″E
- Country: Israel
- District: Southern
- Subdistrict: Beersheba
- Council: Central Arava
- Founded: 1979
- Population (2024): 528

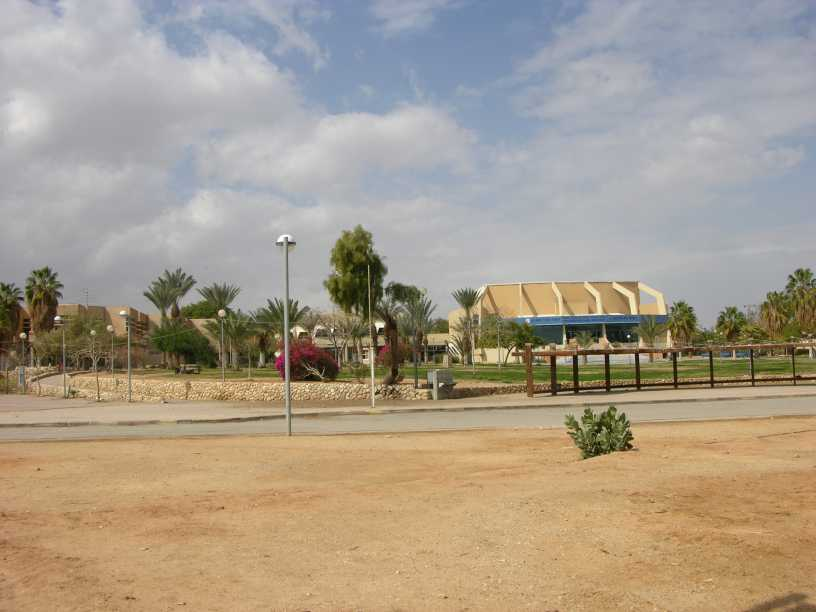
College

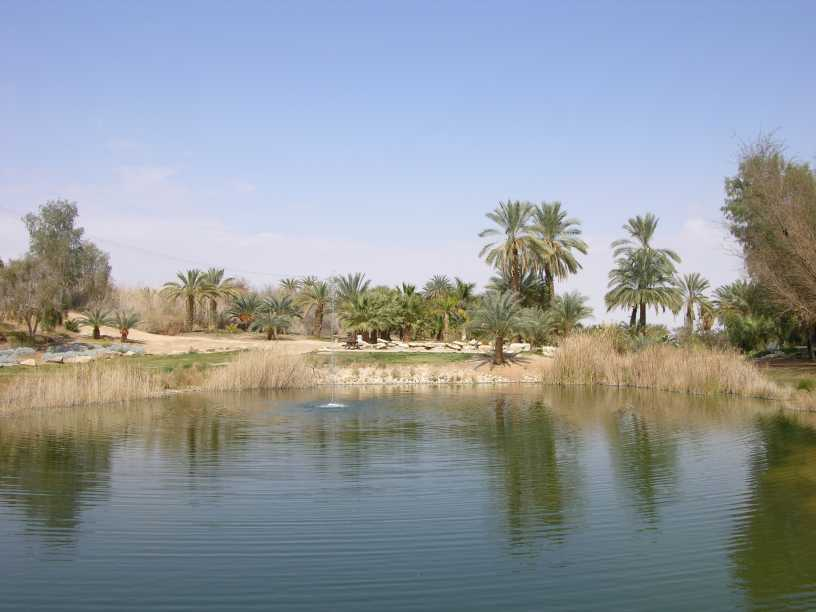
KKL park: life in the desert

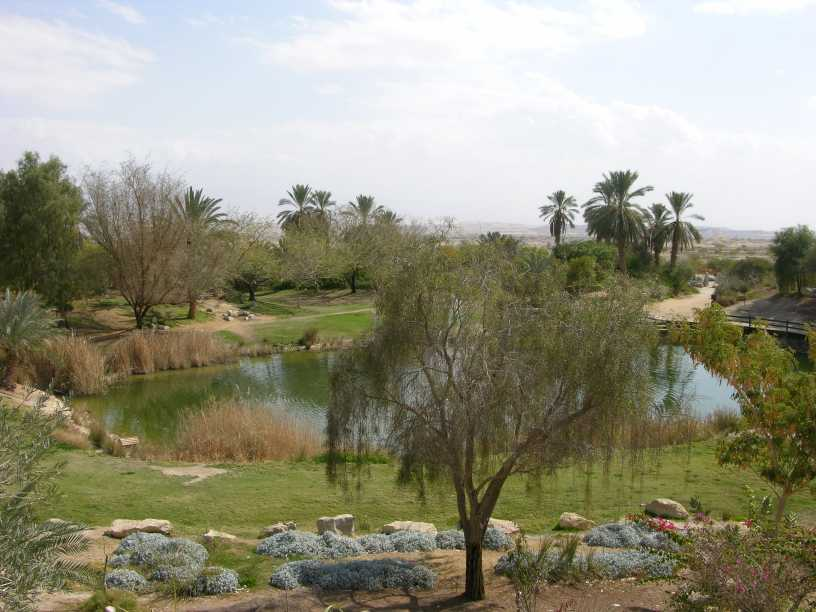
KKL park

Sapir (Hebrew: ספיר) is a community settlement in southern Israel. Located in the Arava valley near Route 90, it falls under the jurisdiction of Central Arava Regional Council. In 2024 it had a population of 528.

== History ==
The village was established in 1979 and is named after Pinchas Sapir. It was planned by the architect Gershon Tzippor and was founded primarily to provide housing for municipal workers of the regional council. As time passed, its nature changed. As of 2006 it houses mostly people of various professions, as opposed to other settlements of the Arava, which mostly do agriculture.

Near the community there is a nature park and an airstrip.
