= Ir Ovot =

Village in southern Israel

Ir Ovot: עיר אובות (Hebrew)
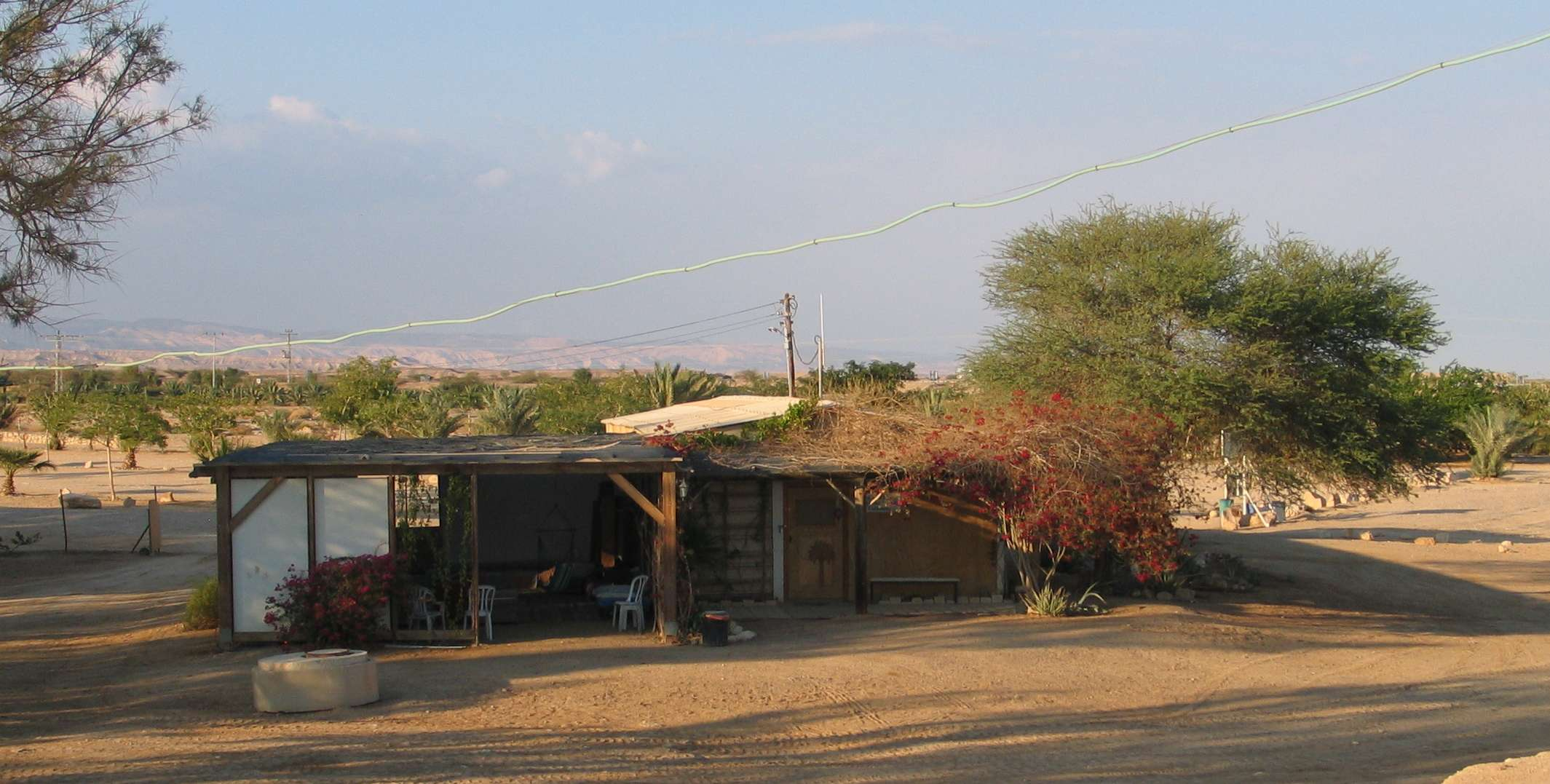
- Etymology: City of Oboth
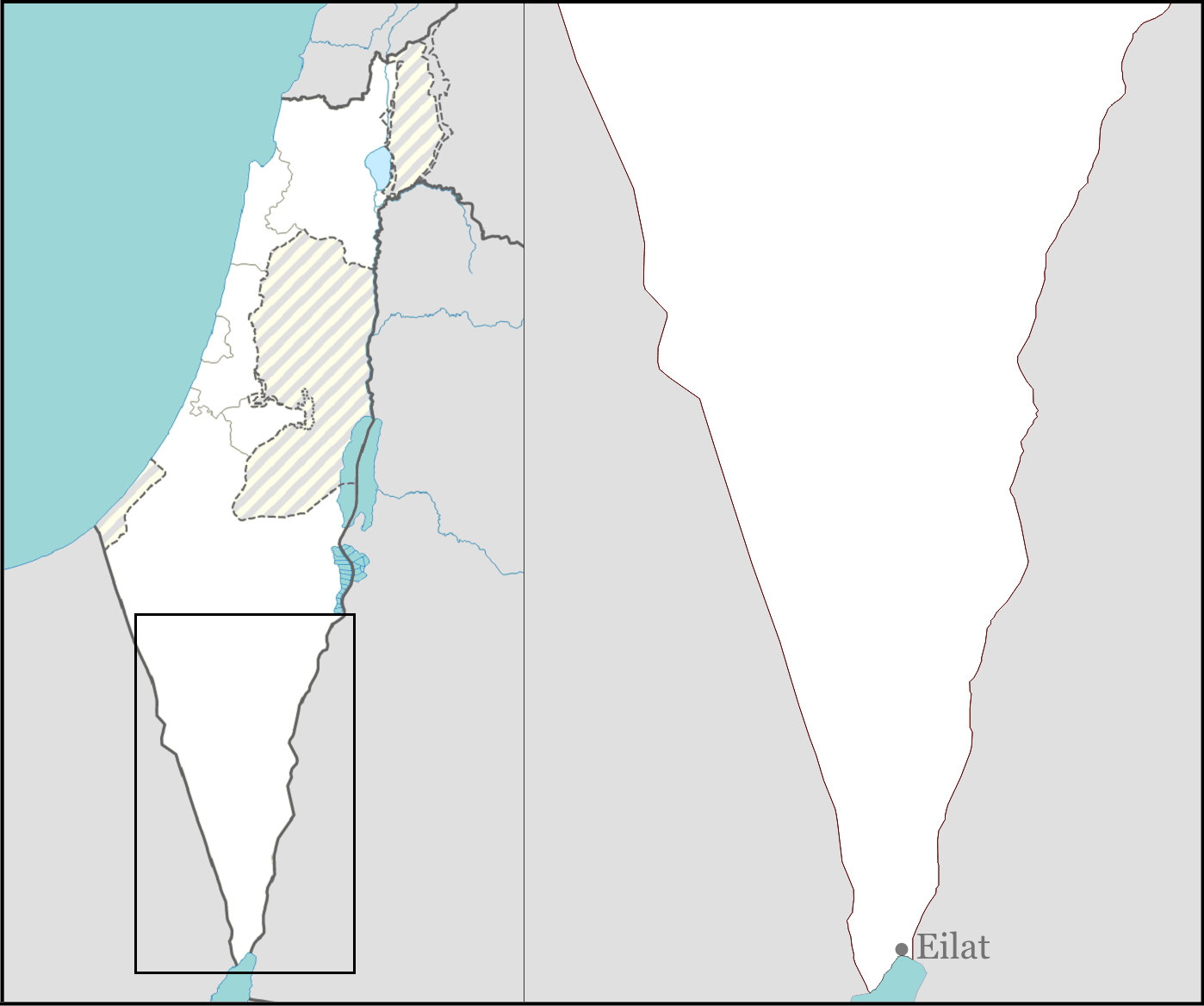
- Location within Southern Negev region of Israel Location within Israel
- Coordinates: 30°48′32″N 35°14′45″E
- Country: Israel
- District: Southern
- Subdistrict: Beersheba
- Council: Central Arava
- Founded: 1967
- Population (2019): 54

Ir Ovot (Hebrew: עיר אובות, lit. 'City of Oboth') is a small community settlement in southern Israel. Located in the northeastern Arava valley, it falls under the jurisdiction of Central Arava Regional Council. It operated as a kibbutz from 1967 until the 1980s. In 2019 it had a population of 54.

It is the site of an extensive archaeological complex known as Tamar Fortress or Hatzevah Fortress (Hebrew: מצודת חצבה) which dates to the 10th century BCE (United Monarchy/First Temple period).

== History ==
Originally the site of the Ein Husub police station during the British Mandate of Palestine, the location was captured by the Israel Defense Forces in 1948. The village of Ir Ovot was founded in 1967, in an area deserted apart from a small military base and roadside cafe on the way to Eilat.

In 2018, a plan was approved for the construction of 250 housing units.

== Geography ==
Ir Ovot is located south of the Dead Sea and southeast of Dimona in the Arabah valley, an arid plain located below the Negev plateau and south of the Jordan Rift Valley within the larger Great Rift Valley. The settlement abuts the Ein Hatzeva bloc of agricultural villages on the opposite side of Highway 90 near the Jordanian border, and is within the boundaries of the Tamar Regional Council. During the period of its governmentally recognised existence as a Kibbutz, its official population was thirty, and it was the smallest community in Israel. pending source--> The community is located close to the biblical site of Tamar, and is west of Hatzeva Junction.

== History of the Hatzeva Fortress ==
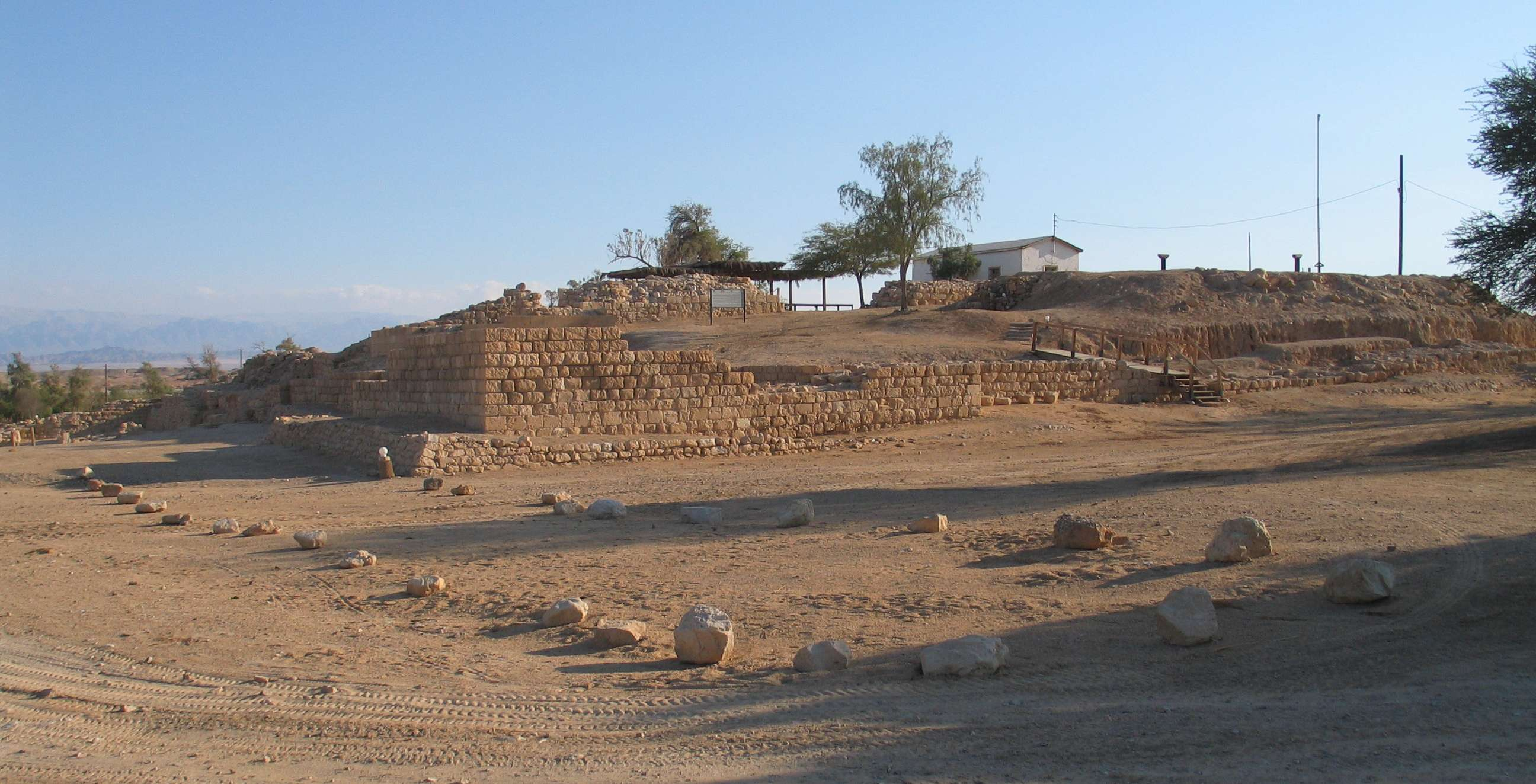
Fortress.

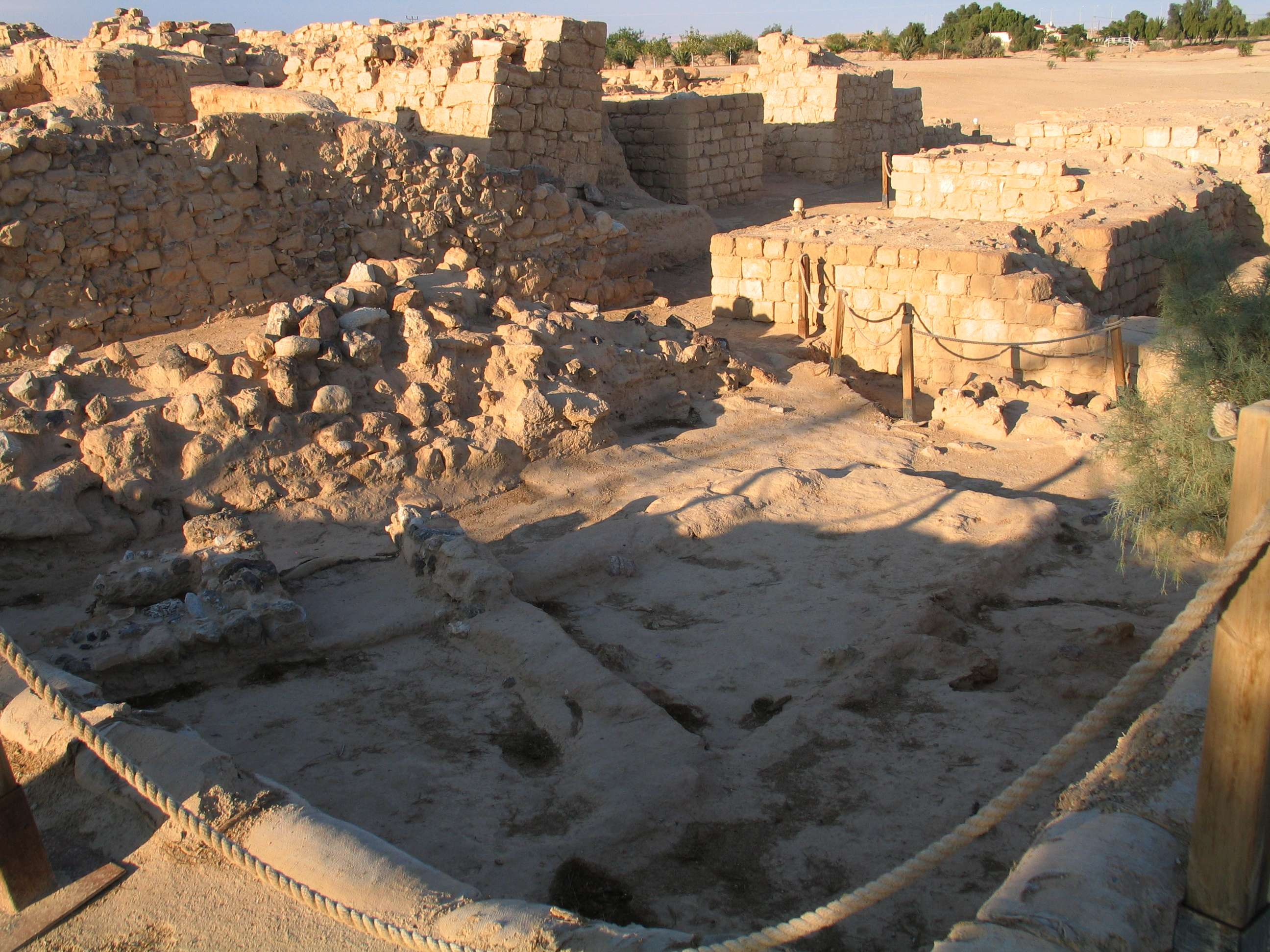
Fortress gate.

First observed and documented by Alois Musil in 1902, the Roman fortress was identified on Fritz Frank's 1932 travels in the region. In 1934, Nelson Glueck identified the location as a Nabatæan caravanserai coopted by the Romans, but the site's true significance was noted by Benjamin Mazar and Michael Avi-Yonah's 1950 discovery of sherds from the First Temple period. In the 1960s, it was first suggested by Yohanan Aharoni that the site might be the same as Tamar of the Book of Ezekiel 47:19 and 48:28, and Eusebius of Caesarea's Tamara.

The first salvage excavation took place in 1972 under Aharoni and Rudolph Cohen's direction, but much of the work was carried out by Cohen, Yigal Yisrael, and recently Tali Erickson-Gini, following the 1986 involvement of "Blossoming Rose" in partnership with the Israel Antiquities Authority, Jewish National Fund and Tamar Regional Council. Known in addition to Tamar as the Hatzeva Fortress, or alternatively identified with Solomon's Tadmor, the site has six strata which indicate Early Israelite, Nabatæan, Edomite, Roman, and Early Arab occupations. It includes a 1,000-year-old shade tree, and the largest Paliurus spina-christi in Israel.

The area was used for training crews in site conservation before their work on the Masada site.

=== 10th century BCE ===
The earliest remains, dating to the Solomonic period of the 10th century BCE, resembles other contemporary Negev plateau fortresses and included period Negevite pottery. Ranging from tenth to sixth centuries BCE, Negevite was also uncovered at Tel Kadesh Barnea and de:Tell el-Kheleifeh; it is probable that this level was destroyed by Pharaoh Shishaq like other sites of that period.

=== 9th–8th century BCE ===
The second layer consists of a very large Iron Age fortification surrounded by a casemate wall. This First Temple period building of the Kingdom of Judah is almost as large as contemporary cities such as Tel Be'er Sheva, and is four times larger than other fortified Negev cities at 10,000 square metres.

Excavation revealed a four-chambered, north-facing gate complex near the northeastern corner and three storerooms, a pair of granaries, a moat and a defensive wall. The city was possibly constructed by King Amaziah of Judah, an 8th-century BCE ruler who fortified the Judean kingdom and went to war with neighbouring Edom in the northern Arabah, or his son Uzziah whose construction of towers in the desert is mentioned by the second Book of Chronicles.

=== 7th–6th century BCE ===
A third fortress from the Late First Temple period from the 7th–6th centuries BCE was found, though because only the walls' foundations remain, reconstructing the floor plan has been difficult. However, an eastern wall with two towers set 14 metres (46 ft) apart was reconstructed.

A pit full of smashed clay and stone, which were reassembled into 74 cultic vessels, was also found, indicating a probable Edomite shrine. Censers, chalices, altars and human figurines were unearthed outside the fortress wall on the site's northern edge in 1993, near the foundations of a small building that seems to have been a shrine. Some of the sherds resemble vessels found in an Edomite shrine at Horvat Qitmit, about 45 kilometres (28 mi) to the northwest. A circular stone stamp seal discovered inside the fortress, picturing two men in long robes on either side of an altar, provides another indicator of Edomite origin. The pit recoveries dating to the end of the seventh century could possibly have been destroyed in the campaign of religious reforms spearheaded by King Josiah mentioned in Book of Kings II.

=== 1st–4th century CE ===
Evidence of Roman administrative and military presence is plentiful, and the junction of the east–west Incense Road to Gaza and the north–south route to the Red Sea probably made it an economically valuable frontier outpost.

The Roman fortress' layout is similar to other imperial outposts in the region. An official Latin inscription that dates several area strongholds to the 3rd century CE was discovered on a large limestone slab at nearby Yotvata bears. This site was the largest in the area at 46 square metres (495 sq ft), and included four projecting towers on the fortress' corners. Artefacts tell of probably destruction in the middle of the fourth century CE, perhaps by a 344 earthquake, though it was promptly rebuilt with improved, stone flooring and again destroyed two decades later, probably from an earthquake in 363.

A thermæ and caravanserai of the same period were also found, and is similar to the thermæ at Ashkelon and others in the nearby country. A row of rooms from an earlier, 1st century BCE to 1st century CE fortress revealed artefacts pointing to a Nabatæan occupation predating Roman annexation. Coins bearing the likeness of Nabatæan kings were found, along with storage jars and other vessels.

=== 7th–8th century CE ===
A building fragment stratum from the Early Arab period was uncovered immediately beneath the ground surface, along with evidence of a farm located above the Roman thermæ's remains and below the modern structures.

== See also ==
- Biblical archaeology
- Incense Route - Desert Cities in the Negev
- Iudaea Province
- History of ancient Israel and Judah
