= British University Vietnam =

Foreign Invested University in Hanoi, Viet Nam

- Trường Đại học Anh Quốc Việt Nam
- Other name: BUV
- Motto: Home of the Lionhearted
- Type: Foreign invested private for-profit University
- Established: 2009
- Founders: Khalid Muhmood MBE & Arabella Peters
- Parent institution: Taylor's Education Group
- Accreditation: Quality Assurance Agency for Higher Education, Ministry of Education and Training
- Affiliations: Pacific Asia Travel Association, British Chamber of Commerce Vietnam, European Chamber of Commerce in Vietnam
- Academic affiliations: University of London, University of Staffordshire, University of Stirling, Arts University Bournemouth, Bournemouth University, Manchester Metropolitan University
- Chair: Professor Michael Driscoll
- Chancellor: Professor Michael Driscoll
- President: Professor Raymond Gordon
- Vice-president: Professor Rick Bennett
- Vice-Chancellor: Professor Raymond Gordon
- Dean: Dr Mark Wheaton
- Director: Professor Raymond Gordon
- Faculty: 94
- Students: 1,986
- Undergraduates: 1,901
- Postgraduates: 85
- Doctoral students: 0
- Location: Lot GD-01, Ecopark Township, Hung Yen, Hung Yen, Vietnam; 20.966251073395817°N 105.93202840797703°E
- Campus: 16,300 square metres (175,000 sq ft); Suburban
- Language: English
- Colours: red, navy blue
- Mascot: Starleo
- Website: buv.edu.vn

British University Vietnam (abbreviated as BUV; Vietnamese: Trường Đại học Anh Quốc Việt Nam) is a private international university in Vietnam with main campus located in Ecopark, Hung Yen.

British University Vietnam was the first university/higher education instiuition (HEI) in Vietnam to earn a 5-star QS rating by Quacquarelli Symonds and is the first HEI in the ASEAN region to pass the International Quality Review (IQR) to receive the QAA's Accreditation. The university's range of subjects includes business, computing, communications, media, visual arts, games, hospitality and tourism.

== History ==
British University Vietnam was founded in 2009 by Khalid Muhmood MBE and Arabella Peters through Dragonfly Education Group, a family business owned by the founders. In 2010, the Vietnamese Ministry of Education and Training (MOET) approved three bachelor's programs: BSc (Hons) International Business Management, BA (Hons) Marketing Management and BSc (Hons) Banking and Finance, with the first two being awarded by the University of Staffordshire and the latter being awarded by the University of London with academic direction by the London School of Economics and Political Sciences (LSE), with both instituitions based in England, United Kingdom.

At the end of 2012, BUV launched a new scholarship scheme named after HRH Prince Andrew, with four full scholarships being awarded annually for the University of Staffordshire's TNE programmes. In 2014, BUV became the Official Registered Centre of the University of London International Programmes, the first one in Vietnam. In 2015, MOET also approved and accreditted BUV for its first-owned, self-awarded bachelor's degree in Finance and Economics.

2015 marked the groundbreaking ceremony to construct Phase 1 of BUV Ecopark campus. The campus construction plan consisted of three phases with a total investment capital of USD 165 million and is invested by Taylor's Education Group, following by an acquisition of the University. In mid-2017, BUV was granted permission to deliver its first TNE postgraduate degree, the Master of Business Administration (MBA), awarded by the University of Staffordshire. In 2018, BUV officially welcomed students to its Ecopark campus. In 2020, BUV announced the British Ambassador's Scholarship, renamed from the previously HRH Prince Andrew's Scholarships. In 2022, the University's Chancellor, Founding President and Chair of the University Council, Sir Graeme Davies, passed away on 30 August 2022 at the age of 85. In his memory, the University renamed their largest Learning Theatre the Sir Graeme Davies Memorial Theatre in 2023. To honour his legacy, his family and the university have collaborated and launched The Sir Graeme J. Davies Scholarship Charity to sponsor the upcoming student intake for the University of London's programmes.

In 2023, BUV became the first university/HEI in Vietnam to achieve 5-star QS certification from Quacquarelli Symonds and the first university/HEI in the ASEAN region to achieve QAA accreditation by fulfilling the IQR standards. BUV also announced TNE partnership with the University of Stirling and Arts University Bournemouth this year, introducing Scotland's TNE degrees to the University, the partnership signing ceremony between the University and the University of Stirling was seen by Scottish Secretary Alister Jack during his visit to Vietnam. In 2024, BUV announced its TNE partnership with Bournemouth University, the fifth TNE partnership with UK universities, which the University is listed to be Bournemouth University's first TNE partnership. This year, BUV was also granted the ability to deliver its self-awarded postgraduate degree in Master of Business Management, with dual-degree option of MSc International Business Management, awarded by the University of Staffordshire.

In 2025, BUV finished their Phase 2 construction of their Ecopark Campus, able to accommodate up to 5,500 students. During the same year, BUV earned the international partner status from the University of London and formed the sixth TNE partnership with Manchester Metropolitan University, delivering MMU degrees in both undergraduate and postgraduate with option for dual award by BUV, with the Manchester Scholarship being announced to mark this milestone. From 2026, as a result from its international partner status with the University of London, the University of London launched the McIntosh Scholarship, their premier global scholarship, for applicants of BUV to its programmes.

== Campus and Facilities ==
=== Ecopark Campus ===
British University Vietnam (BUV) Ecopark Campus is a purpose-built educational facility situated on a 6.5-hectare site in the Ecopark Township, Hung Yen Province. In 2025, the campus completed its second development phase and became the first university in Vietnam to achieve an certification from EDGE, a member of International Finance Corporation. Following a 2025 rebranding, buildings are named after historic United Kingdom castles. The campus master plan prioritises environmental preservation, with buildings occupying only 20% of the total land area. The remaining 80% is dedicated to green space, open-air communal areas, and a regulating pond. The architectural design incorporates a 'honeycomb' facade to optimise natural light and ventilation, alongside shading systems on west-facing structures to mitigate heat absorption.

==== Phase 1 (Completed 2018) ====
The first phase was inaugurated in 2018 and includes the university's primary academic blocks. These buildings house specialised teaching facilities for programmes in business, hospitality, computing, and the creative arts, alongside a sports complex and football pitch.

- Arundel Building (Building A): Named after Arundel Castle, this block contains the primary library, academic support office, lobby and administrative offices.
- Belfast Building (Building B): Named after Belfast Castle, this facility focuses on specialised labs, creative studios, learning kitchens, learning theatres, gyms, hospitality practice spaces, standard classrooms, and Campus Central, BUV's student support office.

==== Phase 2 (Completed 2025) ====
Construction for the second phase reached completion in 2025, significantly expanding the campus footprint with the introduction of three new structures focused on student life and postgraduate studies.

- Cardiff Building (Building C): Named after Cardiff Castle, this serves as the 'Student Hub'. It features an expanded food court and multi-purpose spaces for extracurricular activities.
- Dover Building (Building D): Named after Dover Castle, this block houses the School of Postgraduate Studies, the University of London (UoL) hub, learning theatres, creative studios, recording studios, standard classrooms, student engagement offices, and faculty offices.
- Edinburgh Building (Building E): Named after Edinburgh Castle, this facility provides additional classroom capacity, a sport complex, and underground parkings.

==== Phase 3 (Planned) ====
The third phase is scheduled for completion in 2028. Current plans include the addition of a dedicated indoor sports building and further academic facilities. Following the 2025 naming convention, it is expected that future structures will also adopt UK castle designations.

==== Sustainability and Certifications ====
BUV is the first university in Vietnam to receive the Excellence in Design for Greater Efficiencies (EDGE) Advanced certification, an international green building standard developed by the International Finance Corporation (IFC).

- Phase 1 (Arundel and Belfast Buildings): Awarded EDGE Advanced certification in November 2024.
- Phase 2 (Cardiff, Dover, and Edinburgh Buildings): Awarded EDGE Advanced certification in April 2025.

According to EDGE metrics for Phase 2, the campus achieved the following resource efficiencies compared to conventional university buildings:

- 43% energy savings,
- 40% water savings,
- 61% reduction in embodied carbon.

=== Ba Trieu Campus, Hanoi ===
Prior to the relocation to the Ecopark Township, British University Vietnam (BUV) was headquartered at its Ba Trieu Campus in central Hanoi. Established within the CDC Building at 193 Ba Trieu Street, Hai Ba Trung District, this urban facility served as the university's primary site for teaching and administration from its founding until the inauguration of the Ecopark Campus in 2018. While providing a central location, the campus was contained within a multi-purpose commercial complex, which eventually necessitated the move to a larger, purpose-built facility to accommodate the university's expanding student body and technical requirements.

=== Administrative Office, Hanoi ===
British University Vietnam Company Limited (BUV Co., Ltd) is the administrative and legal entity responsible for the operation of the university. It serves as the primary legislative representative for the institution within Vietnam. The company is headquartered at the Belvedere Centre, 28A Tran Hung Dao Street, Hoan Kiem District, Hanoi. This city-centre location serves two primary functions:

- Administrative Hub: Acting as the registered office for BUV's corporate and legal affairs.
- BUV Training Centre (BUVTC): Hosting specialised teaching facilities for short-term courses and professional development.

BUV Co., Ltd is licensed to manage and deliver a broad spectrum of educational services, including:

- Higher Education: Delivery of undergraduate and postgraduate degree programmes.
- English Language Training: Provision of English for Academic Purposes (EAP) and IELTS preparation.
- Professional Development: Short-term skills training and management advisory services.
- Educational Consultancy: Management advising within the education sector.

=== Transnational Education ===
Besides conducting TNE programmes from its partners in the UK and delivering their own programmes, BUV have franchised their Bachelor in International Hospitality Management to St. Hugh’s College, Laos, allowing students study the programme in Laos can receive a Vietnamese Bachelor award, alongs with optional progression route to BUV. The signing ceremony of both insituitions were graced by Khamphao Ernthavanh, Laos' Ambassador to Vietnam on BUV Ecopark Campus.

== Academic Profile ==
=== Academic Schools ===
British University Vietnam currently has five main school, each delivering and managing their own programmes. The current list of schools are:

- The Business School (TBS): Deliver undergraduate degrees in Business Management, Accounting, Finance, Economics, Tourism, Hospitality, and Events.
- School Computing and Innovative Technologies (SoCIT): Deliver undergraduate degrees in Computing, Data, Software, Artificial Intelligence, and Games.
- School of Communications and Creative Industries (SoCCI): Deliver undergraduate degrees in Arts, Design, Communications, Illustration, Photography and Film.
- The Graduate School (TGS): Deliver postgraduate degrees in Business Management.
- School of Pathways, English, and Lifelong Learning (SPELL): Deliver language learning, summer courses, and foundation programmes.

=== Transnational Education ===
British University Vietnam (BUV) serves as a premier model for transnational education (TNE) in Vietnam. By implementing a franchise, validated, and dual award delivery model in partnership with several UK institutions, BUV ensures that the majority of its programmes are structured according to British academic standards. These degrees are either fully franchised, validated or jointly designed, with the final qualifications awarded by the partner universities.

The following UK institutions currently conduct transnational education programmes in partnership with BUV:

- University of London, Franchise: Undergraduate with Academic Direction by London School of Economics and Political Sciences (Business, Management, Accounting, Finance, Economics, Analytics), Foundation.
- University of Staffordshire, Franchise and Dual award: Postgraduate (Business Administration), Undergraduate (Business, Management, Marketing, Accounting, Finance, Economics, Computer Science, Games, Creative Practices).
- University of Stirling, Franchise: Undergraduate (Data, Artificial Intelligence, Software).
- Arts University Bournemouth, Validated: Undergraduate (Communications, Media, Film).
- Bournemouth University, Franchise: Undergraduate (Tourism, Events).
- Manchester Metropolitan University, Dual award: Postgraduate (Business Management), Undergraduate (Business, Technology, Banking, Finance, Illustration, Animation, Graphic Design).

=== Rankings ===
University rankings

Global – Business and economics
- QS MBA: 251-300 (2027)

Regional – Business
- QS Asia MBA: 41 (2027)

In 2026, British University Vietnam's Arts and Design subjects are ranked #151-200 Globally by QS World University Rankings by Subject 2026. Their MBA programme climbed to #41 on the QS World University Rankings' Full-time MBA Rankings - Asia 2027, a rise of 2 places compare to last year, when the University first made their appearance on global rankings, and #251-300 on the Full-time MBA Rankings - Global 2027 & 2026.

Spoken in QS Higher Education Summit: Asia Pacific 2025, BUV's representative, Professor Rick Bennett, Deputy Vice-chancellor and Vice-president of the University, outlines their roadmap of building strong rankings and reputation to the year of 2050:

- 2022 - First QS 5 Stars (first in Vietnam)
- 2025 - QS 5 Star recertification + QS Global MBA Rankings entry
- 2030 - Entry to the top 100 of the QS World University Rankings: Asia
- 2050 - Entry to the top 100 of the QS World University Rankings

=== Accreditations ===
==== National and International Accreditations ====
British University Vietnam is licensed and accredited by the Ministry of Education and Training (MOET), following the country's national standards, as a foreign-invested higher education institution, and therefore, allowed by the nation's regulatory bodies to deliver and award national degrees in bachelor and master levels. All of contents delivered by BUV is fully-taught by the university, with exceptions of Vietnamese-mandated modules being outsourced to other universities in the region. Additionally, British University Vietnam is recognised by China's Ministry of Education and listed on the Chinese Service Center for Scholarly Exchange's platform, which validate all degrees being taught and awarded by BUV and able to be considered formally by Chinese universities.

In 2023, British University Vietnam is accredited by the Quality Assurance Agency (QAA), followed by an International Quality Review (IQR) conducted by this agency, becoming the first university/HEI in the region to be accredited by QAA, the first foreign-invested university to be listed in MOET's International Accreditation list. The IQR report of QAA on BUV has deemed the following notes as great practices in operation by BUV, being excelled in employer engagement, employability, and personal development for students. QAA also noted a range of recommendations for the university, encouraging the university to consolidate their existing policies to support quality assurance, transparency on documents, governance effective review, mapping student-centered approaches, student engagement in course offerings, define transitions points along student lifecycle, and map institutional data-needs to inform data-driven decision-making.

==== Rating ====
British University Vietnam is awarded by QS-5 stars by Quacquarelli Symonds in 2022. The university is awarded five stars across Teaching, Employability, Academic Development, Facilities, Social Impact, Inclusiveness, and a Specialist Criteria in Economics & Econometrics. Two stars were awarded for Global Engagement, making the overall stars received to be five stars. This achievement have made the university became the first QS-5 stars institution in Vietnam. In 2025, a QS revaluation of the 2022 Stars award were conducted, the newly updated five stars were awarded for Teaching, Facilities, Employability, Good Governance, Social Impact, and Academic Development. While four stars were awarded for Global Engagement, Diversity, Equity & Inclusion, and Specialist Criteria: Economics & Econometrics. This concludes in a five stars overall.

==== Triple Quality Framework ====
Mentioned in the QS Higher Education Summit: Asia Pacific 2025, BUV's representative highlight the university strategy for rankings, accreditation, and reputation, which includes their Triple Quality Framework. The Triple Quality Framework allows BUV to focus on three pillars: Local Accreditation, National Accreditation, and Global Benchmarking. This is evident by BUV is recognised by MOET (Local), receives QAA's accreditation (National), and QS 5-Stars (Global). By following this framework, the University highlights multiple benefits. From higher trust of locals with MOET's accreditation, to their global partnerships efforts, evident by a surge of degree programs, transfer and progression, and awarding partners.

British University Vietnam is considered a case of cross-border accreditation, despite being in Vietnam, having obtained accreditation from the QAA (UK). This model is recognized by international higher education organizations. According to the MACCA Manual – Mercosur Accreditation Agency, "cross-border accreditation plays a significant role in higher education." UNESCO and the OECD define cross-border education as that in which "the teacher, student, program, institution/provider, or course materials cross national borders." This model confirms the already established practice in international higher education: accreditation agencies, whether institutional or programmatic, do not limit their activities to their national territory and can evaluate and accredit universities in different countries.

=== Awards ===
In 2013, British University Vietnam were awarded the following:

- Golden Dragon Award, organised by Vietnam Economic Times and Vietnam Trade Promotion Agency, Ministry of Industry and Trade.

In 2025, British University Vietnam were awarded the following:

- Placed 9th in the AI Innovation in Education category, organised by EDUtech Asia.
- Leading Educational Instituition in AI Application Award, AI4VN - AI Awards 2025, organised by VnExpress.
- Top 3 for Admission Process in the Global Student Satisfaction Awards by Studyportals.
- Top 5 for International Students in Vietnam by EduOpinions.
- Top 50-100 Vietnam 100 Best Places to Work 2025 - Medium Enterprises by Anphabe.

== Programmes ==
British University Vietnam facilitate a wide range of programs, from pre-university, undergraduate and graduate from their awarding partners, dual degree from BUV with partner, or solely awarded by BUV. Currently, BUV's roster of awarding partners includes the University of London (UoL/Lond), University of Staffordshire (Staffs) (2010), University of Stirling (Stir), Arts University Bournemouth (AUB) (2023), Bournemouth University (BU/Bourne) (2024), and Manchester Metropolitan University (MMU/Manc Met) (2025). All programmes listed offered their own Exit qualifications if their final qualifications for the programme is granted by an UK institutions. The currently offered, teach-out, discontinued, and pending programs include:

(* Dual degree option available)

=== Pathways, English & Lifelong Learning ===
- International Foundation Programme, the University of London
- Pathway to University
- IELTS for University
- UniPath (English for Academic Purposes - EAP)

=== Undergraduate ===
==== The Business School ====
Awarded by the University of London, with Academic Direction by London School of Economics

- Bachelor of Science, Finance
- Bachelor of Science, Accounting and Finance
- Bachelor of Science, Economics and Management
- Bachelor of Science, Business and Management
- Bachelor of Science, Data Science and Business Analytics

Awarded by the University of Staffordshire

- Bachelor of Science, International Business Management
- Bachelor of Science, Accounting and Finance
- Bachelor of Science, Finance and Economics*
- Bachelor of Art, Digital & Social Media Marketing

Awarded by Bournemouth University

- Bachelor of Art, Tourism Management
- Bachelor of Art, Events Management

Awarded by Manchester Metropolitan University

- Bachelor of Science, Digital Business and Technology Innovation*
- Bachelor of Science, Banking and Finance*
- Bachelor of Science, International Hospitality and Tourism Business Management*
- Bachelor of Art, Business and Management for Sustainability*
- Bachelor of Art, Human Resource Management and Business*
- Bachelor of Art, Business Entrepreneurship*
- Bachelor of Art, Marketing*

Awarded by British University Vietnam

- Bachelor of International Hospitality Management*
- Bachelor of Finance and Economics*
- Bachelor of Business Technology*
- Bachelor of Banking & International Finance*
- Bachelor of Sustainable Business Management*
- Bachelor of Human Resource Management and Organisational Psychology*
- Bachelor of Business Entrepreneurship and Innovation*
- Bachelor of Marketing Management*

==== School of Computing and Innovative Technologies ====
Awarded by the University of Staffordshire

- Bachelor of Science, Computer Science
- Bachelor of Science, Computer Games Design and Programming
- Bachelor of Science, Games Art

Awarded by the University of Stirling

- Bachelor of Science, Data Science and Artificial Intelligence
- Bachelor of Science, Software Engineering

Awarded by Manchester Metropolitan University

- Bachelor of Science, AI and Data Science*
- Bachelor of Science, Computer Science*

Awarded by British University Vietnam

- Bachelor of Computer Science (Game Innovation)
- Bachelor of Computing and Intelligent Technologies*
- Bachelor of Applied AI and Data Science*

==== School of Communications and Creative Industries ====
Awarded by the University of Staffordshire

- Bachelor of Arts, Contemporary Creative Practice: Graphic Design
- Bachelor of Arts, Contemporary Creative Practice: Illustration
- Bachelor of Arts, Contemporary Creative Practice: Photography
- Bachelor of Arts, Contemporary Creative Practice: Animation

Awarded by Arts University Bournemouth

- Bachelor of Arts, Professional Communication (Business, Design & Strategy)
- Bachelor of Arts, Film and Media Production

Awarded by Manchester Metropolitan University

- Bachelor of Arts, Illustration with Animation*
- Bachelor of Arts, Graphic Design*

Awarded by British University Vietnam

- Bachelor of Design (Illustration & Animation)*
- Bachelor of Design (Graphics)*
- Bachelor of Events and Entertainment Management (Communication, Technology and Business)

=== Postgraduate ===
==== The Graduate School ====
Awarded by the University of Staffordshire

- Master of Business Administration

Awarded by Manchester Metropolitan University

- Master of Science, International Business Management*
- Master of Science, AI for Digital Business*
- Master of Science, Business Analytics*

Awarded by British University Vietnam

- Master of Business*

=== Teach-out/Discontinued ===
==== The Business School ====
Awarded by the University of London, with Academic Direction by London School of Economics

- Bachelor of Science, Management and Digital Innovation

Awarded by the University of Staffordshire

- Bachelor of Arts, Marketing Management
- Bachelor of Arts, Tourism Management
- Bachelor of Arts, Events Management

==== School of Computing and Innovative Technologies ====
Awarded by the University of Staffordshire

- Bachelor of Science, Computer Science: Cyber Security
- Bachelor of Science, Computer Science: Cloud Technologies

==== The Graduate School ====
Awarded by the University of Staffordshire

- Master of Science, International Business Management*

Awarded by British University Vietnam

- Master of Business: Global Management*
- Master of Business: Digital Marketing*
- Master of Business: Creative Industries*
- Master of Business: Tourism and Hospitality*
- Master of Business: Fintech and Data Analytics*

=== Pending Programmes ===
It is listed on the University of London's portal of the below programmes, however, the University have not conducted teaching for these programmes.

With Academic Direction by King's College London

- Bachelor of Science, Psychology

With Academic Direction by Queen Mary University of London

- Master of Business Administration
- Master of Business Administration (Accountancy)
- Master of Business Administration (Entrepreneurship and Innovation)
- Master of Business Administration (Finance)
- Master of Business Administration (Law)
- Master of Business Administration (Leadership)
- Master of Business Administration (Marketing)

With Academic Direction by University College London

- Master of Business Administration (Health)

With Academic Direction by City St George's, University of London

- Master of Science, Supply Chain Management and Global Logistics

== Student life ==
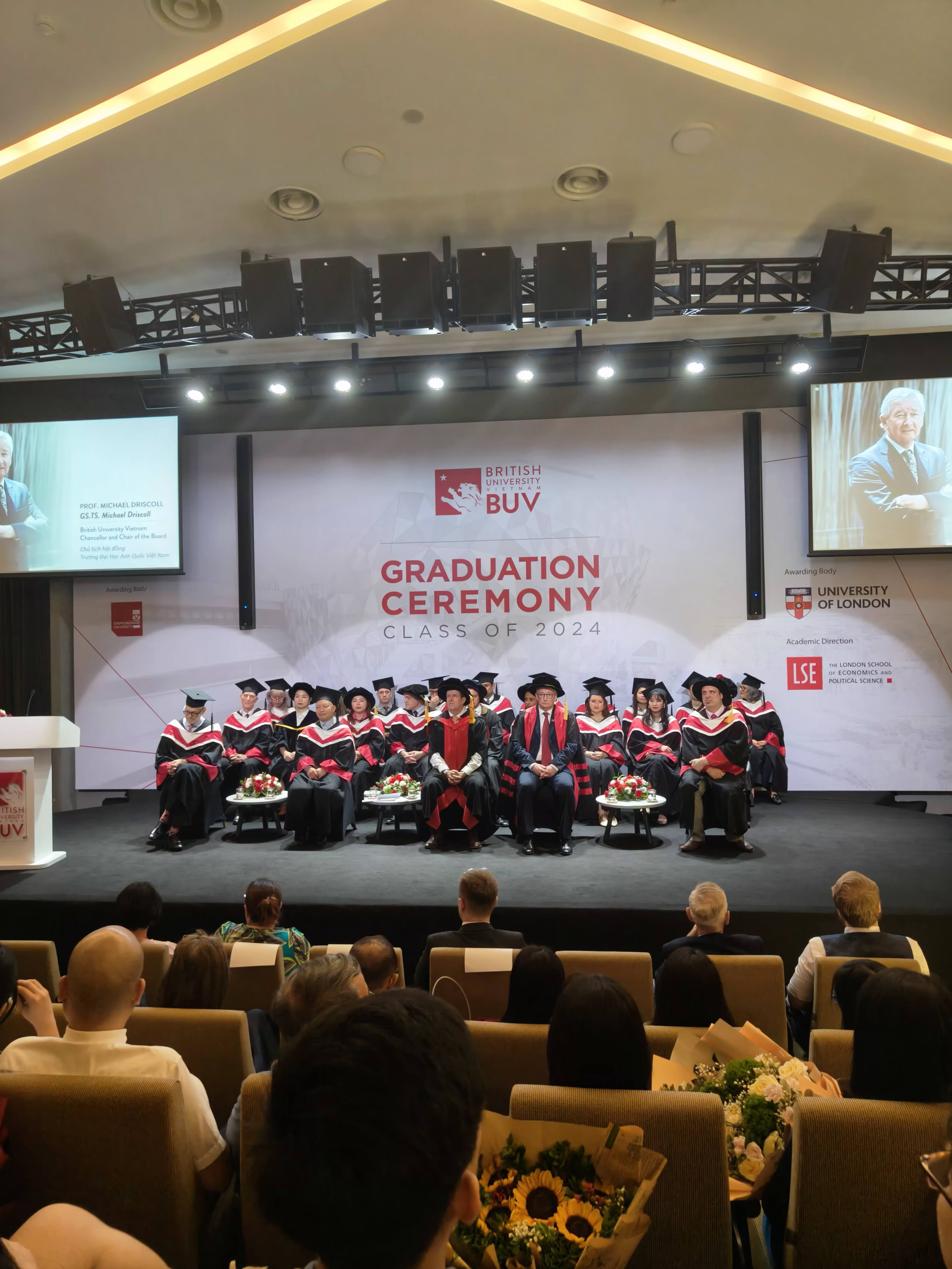
Graduation Ceremony for the Class of 2024

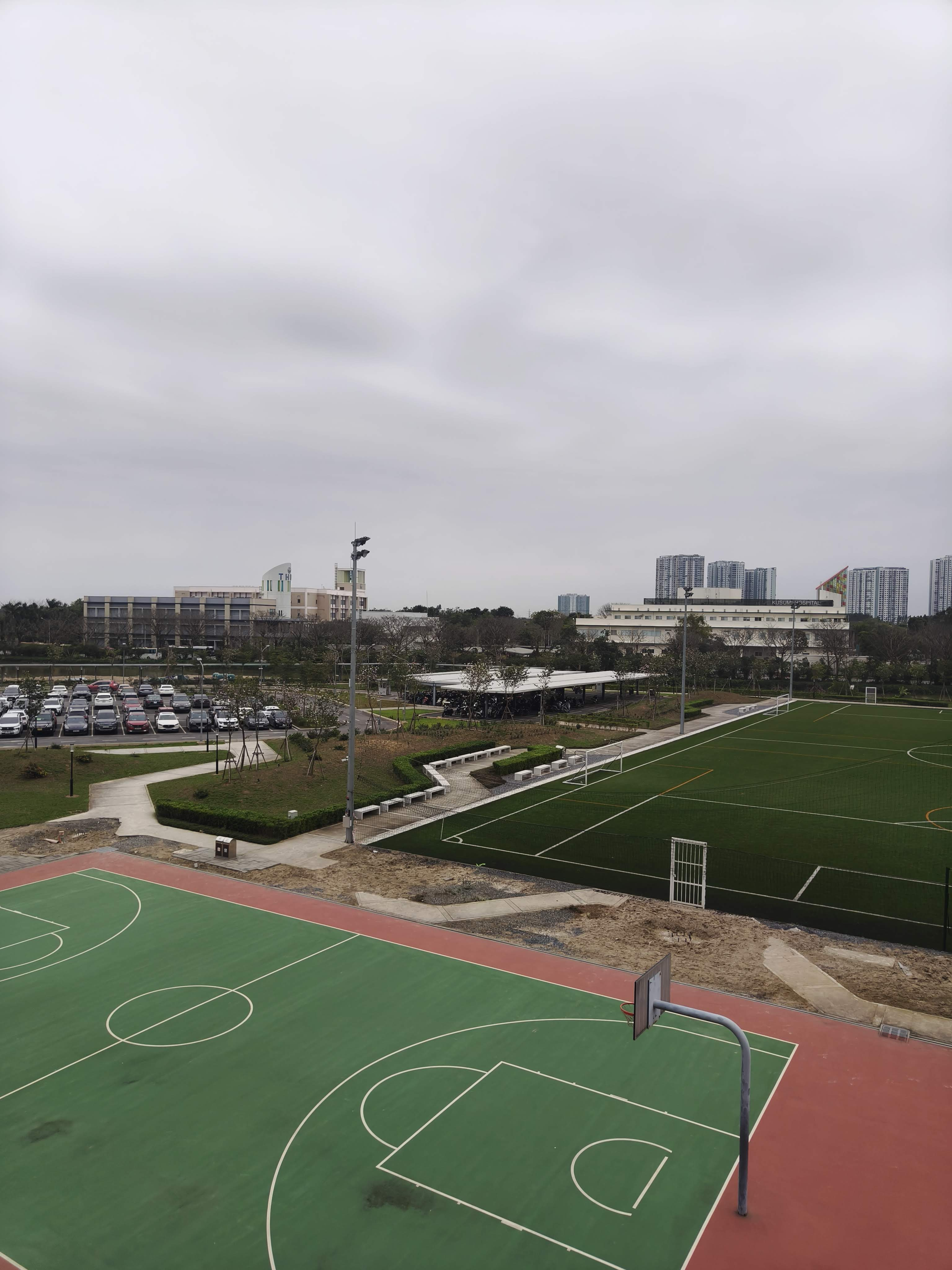
An elevated, wide-angle shot of the campus sports complex, featuring a basketball court in the foreground and a football pitch in the mid-ground.

British University Vietnam's student population stood at 2002 in 2022-2023. BUV currently operates over 30 student clubs and societies, with one student council named the Student Association Committee (SAC). The SAC consists of seven students voted by all BUV students to represent the student community. The SAC is granted authority to dialogue with the University's governing party under the Student Engagement Department's (SE) oversight and is considered an affiliate of British University Vietnam. BUV student clubs include dance, basketball, football, fashion, esports, volunteer, photography, etc., all operated by students under the supervision of SE. Student projects such as TEDxBUV, Hult Prize and Z Marketers are also organised and operated annually by students. Students can also expect well-being and psychological support, from consultation to psychological workshops. BUV offers student accommodation operated by BUV Student Accommodation Management (BASM). These accommodations are situated within Ecopark, 2km away from their main campus.

BUV also partnered with industry partners to ensure students' employment after graduation and during studies. with various internship options, employment opportunities, career coaching, field trips, career fairs, and workshops. BUV currently maintains that 100% of graduates are employed (except study-progressing students) three months after graduation.

BUV students can enjoy international exchanges, transfers, short-term studies, and progression studies organised and managed by the International Office (IO). IO continuously organises discounts, home tuition offers, scholarships, and language requirements exemptions with a partner universities network from the UK, Australia, New Zealand, Germany, France, etc. For the UK, many of which are member of the Russell Group, including the University of Bristol, University of Southampton, University of Exeter, University of York, University of Sheffield, University of Liverpool.

== See also ==
- University of London
- London School of Economics and Political Sciences
- University of Staffordshire
- University of Stirling
- Arts University Bournemouth
- Bournemouth University
- Manchester Metropolitan University
- Taylor's Education Group
