= List of schools in Putrajaya =

List of schools in Putrajaya, Malaysia

This is a list of schools in Putrajaya, Malaysia. It is categorised according to the variants of schools in Malaysia, and is arranged alphabetically.

== Fully residential schools ==
- Sekolah Alam Shah

== National schools ==
=== Primary education: Sekolah Kebangsaan (SK) ===
- Sekolah Kebangsaan Putrajaya Presint 8 (1) [formally known as Sekolah Kebangsaan Putrajaya 1]
- Sekolah Kebangsaan Putrajaya Presint 8 (2)
- Sekolah Kebangsaan Putrajaya Presint 9 (1) [formally known as Sekolah Kebangsaan Putrajaya 2]
- Sekolah Kebangsaan Putrajaya Presint 9 (2)
- Sekolah Kebangsaan Putrajaya Presint 11 (1) [formally known as Sekolah Kebangsaan Putrajaya 4]
- Sekolah Kebangsaan Putrajaya Presint 11 (2)
- Sekolah Kebangsaan Putrajaya Presint 11 (3)
- Sekolah Kebangsaan Putrajaya Presint 14 (1)
- Sekolah Kebangsaan Putrajaya Presint 16 (1) [formally known as Sekolah Kebangsaan Putrajaya 3]
- Sekolah Kebangsaan Putrajaya Presint 16 (2)
- Sekolah Kebangsaan Putrajaya Presint 17 (1)
- Sekolah Kebangsaan Putrajaya Presint 18 (1)
- Sekolah Kebangsaan Putrajaya Presint 18 (2)

=== Secondary education: Sekolah Menengah Kebangsaan (SMK) ===
School code	School name	Postcode	Area	Coordinates
WEA2004	SMK Putrajaya Presint 11(1)	62300	Putrajaya	2.9500°N 101.6780°E
WEA2008	SMK Putrajaya Presint 11(2)	62300	Putrajaya	2.9687°N 101.6720°E
WEA2007	SMK Putrajaya Presint 14(1)	62300	Putrajaya	2.9533°N 101.7220°E
WEA2003	SMK Putrajaya Presint 16(1)	62150	Putrajaya	2.9324°N 101.7090°E
WEA2009	SMK Putrajaya Presint 18(1)	62150	Putrajaya	2.9220°N 101.6940°E
WEA2010	SMK Putrajaya Presint 5(1)	62000	Putrajaya	2.8897°N 101.6766°E
WEA2001	SMK Putrajaya Presint 8(1)	62250	Putrajaya	2.9399°N 101.6850°E
WEA2002	SMK Putrajaya Presint 9(1)	62250	Putrajaya	2.9423°N 101.6780°E
WEA2005	SMK Putrajaya Presint 9(2)	62250	Putrajaya	2.9366°N 101.6760°E

- Sekolah Menengah Kebangsaan Agama Putrajaya

== Private schools ==
=== International schools ===
- International Modern Arabic School
- Nexus International School Malaysia
- Spectrum International School Putrajaya
