= Galvin Lee Kuan Sian =

Malaysian educator, marketing researcher and writer

- 李冠贤
- Born: January 3, 2001 (age 25); Kuching, Sarawak, Malaysia
- Education: University of Bedfordshire (MBA); Taylor's University (BBus, PGCE); University of the West of England (BA)
- Occupations: Educator, marketing researcher, writer
- Employer: Taylor's College
- Known for: AI-integrated, experiential and gamified business education
- Notable work: The HyFlex Operating System; Global Voices: AI Persona Lab
- Awards: Lecturer of the Year (2025); Innovative Educator of the Year (2025)
- Website: galvinlee.com

Galvin Lee Kuan Sian (Chinese: 李冠贤) is a Malaysian educator, marketing researcher, and writer. He is a lecturer of marketing and economics and Programme Coordinator for the Diploma in Business at Taylor's College, and a PhD candidate in Marketing at the Asia-Europe Institute, Universiti Malaya. His work has been associated with the use of artificial intelligence, simulations, and gamification in business education. In 2025, he received the titles Lecturer of the Year and Innovative Educator of the Year at the Global Education Awards 2025.

== Early life and education ==
Lee is from Kuching, Sarawak. He completed an MBA in Marketing at the University of Bedfordshire, a Bachelor of Business (Honours) in Finance and Economics at Taylor's University, and a Bachelor of Arts in Economics at the University of the West of England, Bristol. He also holds a postgraduate diploma in strategic management and has pursued further professional training in education, finance, analytics, and digital pedagogy.

== Career ==
Lee serves at Taylor's College as Lecturer I and Programme Coordinator for the Diploma in Business. His work at the college has included teaching in consumer behaviour, principles of marketing, microeconomics, international business, and entrepreneurship, alongside programme and administrative responsibilities within the School of Diploma and Professional Studies. He has also been involved in academic integrity work, institutional initiatives on student digital engagement, and broader teaching and learning activities within Taylor's Education Group.

== Teaching and educational initiatives ==
Lee's teaching has focused on AI-supported, experiential, and gamified approaches to business education. His project Global Voices: AI Persona Lab has been described as an artificial intelligence-supported learning environment used to guide students through inquiry, reflection, and regional market analysis. News reports on his classroom practice have linked the project to his wider use of simulations and gamification in teaching.

The project was also associated with competition success in 2025, including Gold Awards at the International E-Content Development Competition (e-Condev) and the International University Carnival on E-Learning (IUCEL), recognised by the Ministry of Higher Education, Malaysia. Taylor's University's public profile further lists conference presentations and additional innovation-related teaching projects connected with his work in higher education.

Outside his institutional role, Lee is the founder of the Galvin Lee Innovation Lab, a platform described on his Taylor's profile as focusing on AI-driven educational tools, immersive learning experiences, and digital solutions for teaching and learning. In May 2026, Global Good published an interview profile of Lee and the laboratory focused on AI-enabled learning, educator workload, assessment integrity, and the role of human judgement in technology-supported education.

== Research, publications and commentary ==
Lee is a PhD candidate in marketing at the Asia-Europe Institute, Universiti Malaya. His doctoral work has been associated with research on the influence of dynamic pricing on consumer behaviour in e-commerce firms in Malaysia. His broader research interests include consumer behaviour, digital marketing, e-commerce, international business, economics, higher education, and quantitative analysis. He also sits as a member on the editorial board of the International Journal of Retail and Consumer Research, and regularly reviews for the International Journal of Sustainability in Higher Education and Journal of Educational Research.

His published work has addressed topics such as social commerce, sustainability in higher education, brand strategy, mobile gaming, online shopping behaviour, and digital branding. He has also written commentary on education, public policy, and technology for Malaysian media outlets including Malay Mail, Bernama, Malaysiakini, The Star, and the New Straits Times. In March 2026, Channel News Asia and Free Malaysia Today quoted Lee in coverage of Malaysia's proposed restrictions on social media use by children under 16, reporting his view that the measure would provide crucial support to parents.

=== Selected works ===
- The HyFlex Operating System (2026). Galvin Lee Publications. ISBN 978-629-94927-0-2.
- Lee, G. K. S. (2025). "Trust in Social Commerce: Challenges and Opportunities for Building Consumer Confidence and Shaping Purchase Intention". International Journal of Applied Research in Business and Management 6(1).
- Lee, G. K. S. (2026). "Unbundling Business Education: A Review of Micro-Credentials as Drivers of Higher Education Innovation and Labor Market Alignment". International Journal of Educational Reform.

=== Selected commentary ===
- "How compulsory BM and History can strengthen Malaysia's education hub ambition" on Malay Mail (26 January 2026).
- "Malaysia's Education Hub Ambition: Why Compulsory BM And History Matter" on Bernama (30 January 2026).
- "The under-16 social media ban isn't the hard part, making it work is" on Malay Mail (27 December 2025).

== Awards and recognition ==
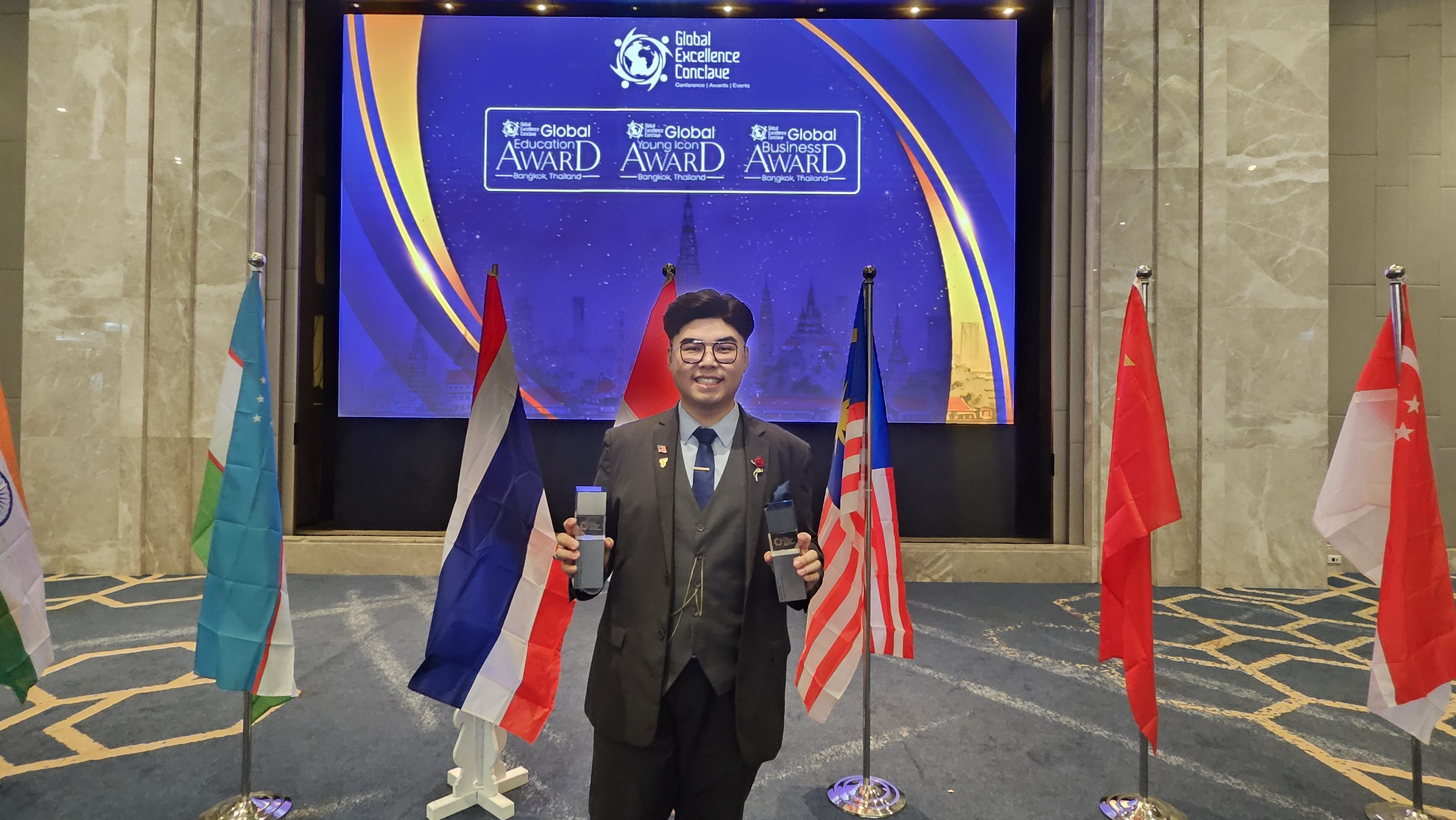
Lee awarded the "Lecturer of the Year" and "Innovative Educator of the Year" at the Global Education Awards 2025.

Lee's most widely reported recognition came at the Global Education Awards 2025, where he received the titles Lecturer of the Year and Innovative Educator of the Year. His Taylor's profile also lists awards from higher-education innovation and e-learning competitions, including e-Condev, IUCEL, IIDEL, EMAS, MJIC, and i-GEN. He has also been listed by the International Federation of Inventors' Associations with the title Inv..

== Professional affiliations and service ==
Lee's public Taylor's profile lists affiliations with professional and academic bodies including the Malaysian Invention and Design Society, the Malaysian Economic Association, the Malaysian Social Science Association, the Chartered Institute of Marketing, the Institute of Marketing Malaysia, the Academy of Marketing Science, and the British Academy of Management. The same profile also lists editorial board, reviewing, judging, and competition-related service roles in education and innovation.
