= BUV =

BUV or buv can refer to:

- Basic utility vehicle, a type of vehicle
- Bun language, a language spoken in Biwat village, Papua New Guinea, by ISO 639 code
- Placeres Airport, an airport in Bella Unión, Uruguay, by IATA code
- Backscatter UV Spectrometer, a UV spectrometer instrument aboard the Explorer 55 NASA satellite
- British University Vietnam, co-founded by British entrepreneur Khalid Muhmood
- Buena Vista station, an Amtrak Thruway station in Buena Vista, Colorado, U.S.; see List of Amtrak stations#Amtrak Thruway stations
