= Arava Institute for Environmental Studies =

Israeli study and research institute

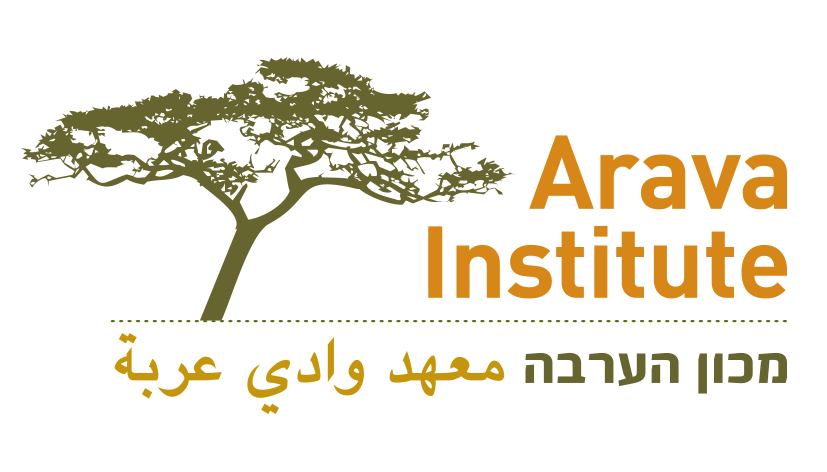
- Motto: Nature knows no borders
- Type: Semester or year-long; undergraduate & graduate
- Established: 1996
- Affiliations: Kibbutz Ketura
- Academic affiliations: Ben-Gurion University of the Negev
- Officer in charge: Dr. Tareq Abu Hamed
- Academic Director: Dr. Jessica Schäckermann
- Location: D.N. Hevel Eilot, 8884000, Israel; 29°58′3.36″N 35°4′15.24″E
- Campus: Rural
- Language: English
- Website: arava.org

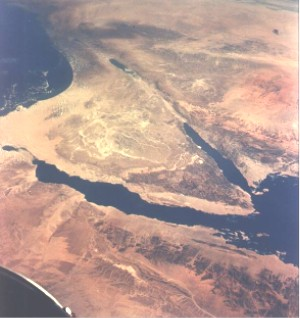
The Arava is a long desert valley in a natural rift located between the Dead Sea and the Gulf of Aqaba, a northern extension of the Red Sea.

The Arava Institute for Environmental Studies is an academic studies and research institute located in Kibbutz Ketura on the Israeli side of the Arava Valley. The Arava Institute's stated mission is to advance cross-border environmental cooperation in the face of political conflict.

== Students and academic programs ==
Students at the Arava Institute live on Kibbutz Ketura while taking classes in sustainable development, water management, environmental law, economic policy, environmental science, and other topics in environmental studies. Classes are taught in English. Members of the faculty are often guest lecturers from universities, both in Israel and abroad, or professionals in fields such as public policy and water management.

Since its founding in 1996, by Alon Tal, the Arava Institute has hosted over 800 graduate and undergraduate students of various nationalities, including Israeli Jews, Israeli Arab, Palestinian, Jordanian, Egyptian, Tunisian, Moroccan, European and American students.

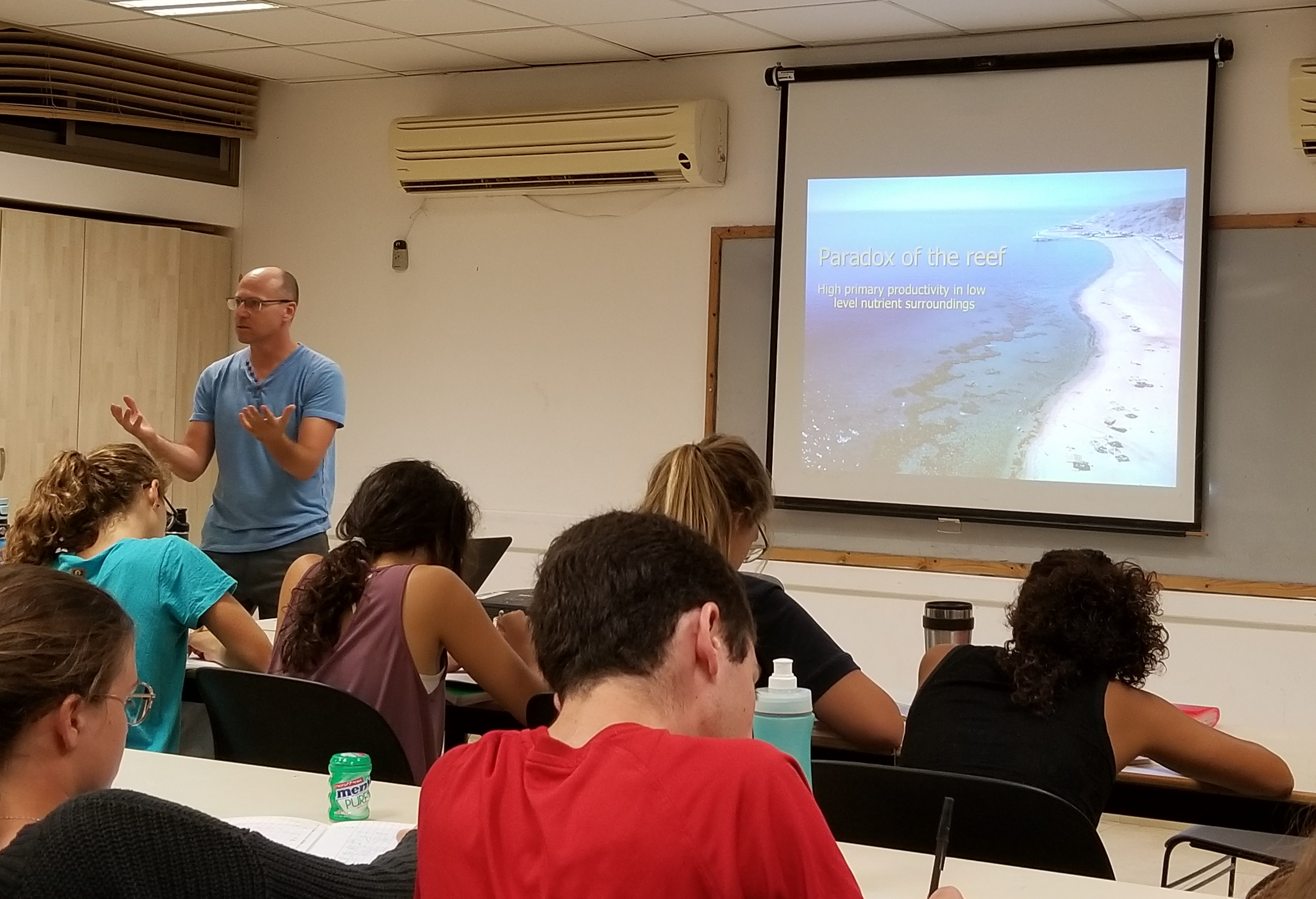
Lecture on the ecology of coral reefs in the Gulf of Aqaba, 2018

AIES students can participate in semester and year-long programs accredited through Ben-Gurion University as well as two master's degree graduate programs granted by Ben-Gurion University – one in Environmental Desert Studies and the other a "Green" MBA that teaches environmental sustainability and efficiency as well as business management skills. A three-week summer course is sometimes offered to study biodiversity and environmental challenges in the Arabah Valley. The Arava Institute is considering establishing a joint Master's program with Al-Quds University, the only Arab institution of higher learning in Jerusalem.

All AIES students are required to completes a non-credit bearing Peace-Building and Environmental Leadership Seminar.

== Alumni ==
- Hashem Shahin, a Muslim Palestinian alumnus, is part of a joint Israeli-Palestinian project to discover the genetic basis of deafness.
- Tamar Keinan, a Jewish Israeli alumna, joined a Jordanian alumnus to create the "Good Neighbors Water Project" for Friends of the Earth Middle East.
- Laithi Gnaim, an Israeli Arab alumnus, established a nongovernmental organization called "Arrasid" (Bearing Witness) which trains Arab farmers in the Beit Netofa Valley in sustainable farming techniques.
- Maya Negev, a Jewish Israeli alumna, working at the Herzog Center for Policy in Tel Aviv University.

The Arava Institute has recently created The Arava Alumni Peace and Environmental Network (AAPEN) to bring together alumni for an annual conference held in varying locations in the Middle East, as well as an online presence on Facebook, a private online network (NING), updated pages on the Arava website for alumni, and a newsletter.

== Research centers ==
In addition to its academic programs, the Arava Institute conducts cross-border studies in four research centers:

- The Center for Hyper-Arid Socio-Ecology (CHASE), directed by Dr. Miri Lavi Neeman, is dedicated to the study of the natural ecosystems in the Arava valley and the interaction between those ecosystems and the region's people. The center brings together Jordanian and Israeli researchers to map the biodiversity of the region. Projects include monitoring of the 2014 Evrona Oil Spill.
- The Center for Renewable Energy and Energy Conservation (CREEC), directed by Dr. Tareq Abu Hamed, conducts research in a wide variety of subjects focusing on energy policy, solar fuels, photovoltaic technologies, biomass, wind and solar thermal energy, as well as building construction techniques customized to conserve energy in desert climates.

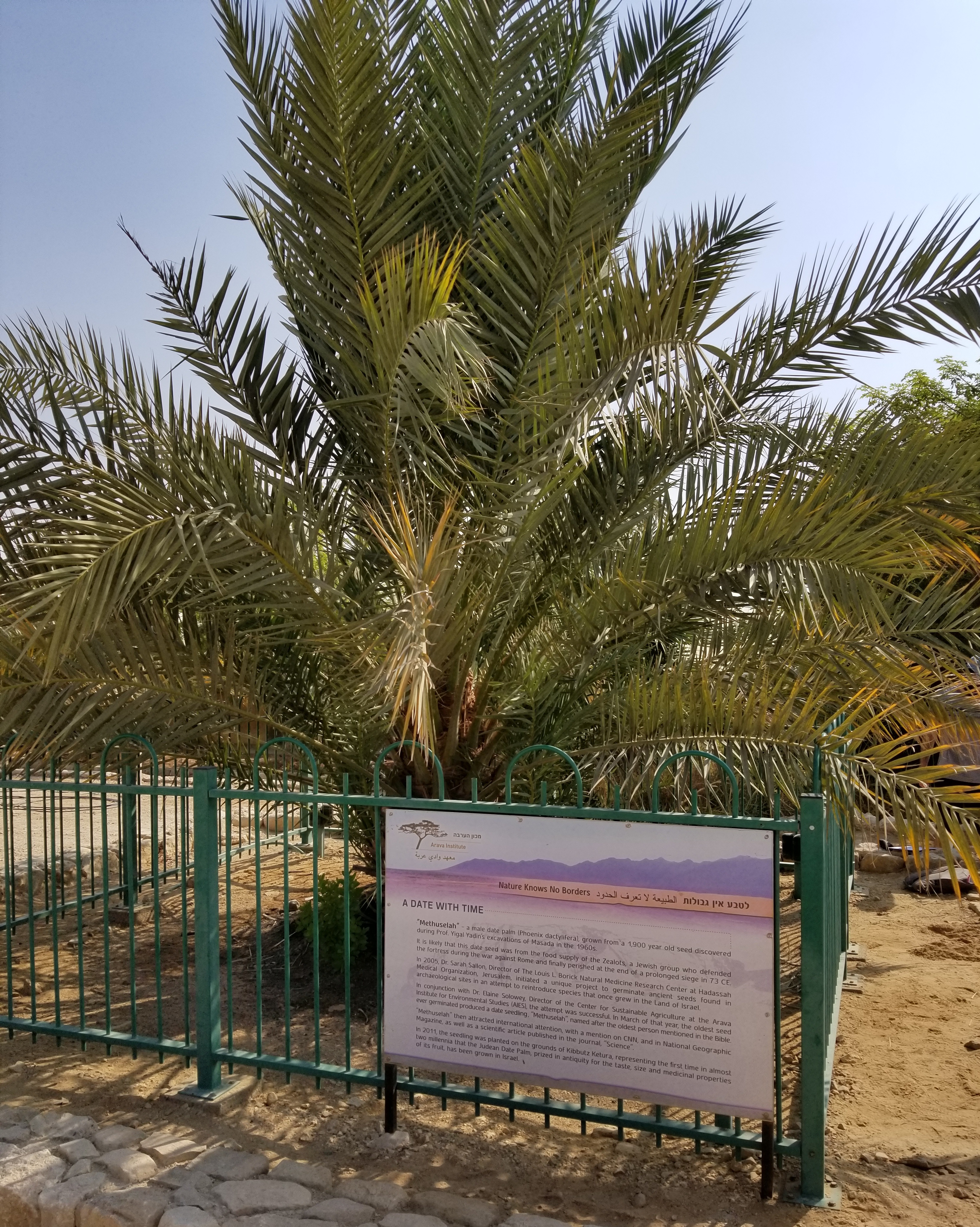
The "Methuselah" tree

- The Center for Sustainable Agriculture (CSA), directed by Dr. Elaine Solowey, is dedicated to the investigation and preservation of arid lands and their natural resources. Among the center's projects is the sprouting of a 2,000-year-old date seed, nicknamed "Methuselah", and the revival of the frankincense tree in Israel 1,500 years after its last appearance in the region.
- The Center for Transboundary Water Management (CTWM), directed by Dr. Clive Lipchin, provides a platform for water professionals and policymakers from Israel, Palestine and Jordan to work in water conservation, desalination, wastewater treatment and education. Its projects include the installation of greywater treatment systems in Israel and the West Bank, and research on sinkholes and desalination in the Dead Sea basin.

In addition, the Arava Center for Sustainable Development (ACSD), under the supervision of Dr. Shmuel Brenner, aims to reduce poverty, enhance sustainability and empower communities by supporting locally driven, environmentally focused development programs worldwide. One of those programs is the agricultural development program "Furrows in the Desert" in Turkana, Kenya, which intends to create greater food security to the region by building local capacity in sustainable agriculture.

== De-extinction projects ==
Although the Arava Institute for Environmental Studies is not an organization dedicated to de-extinction, the institute is known internationally for the revival, reintroduction, and discovery of plants such as the Judean date palm, an unknown Commiphora, and the frankincense tree from germination of ancient seeds found in excavations. The Judean date palm went extinct in the 1500s, while the frankincense tree was extirpated from Israel over 1500 years ago. The specimen of the unknown Commiphora, "Sheba", has yet to be formally described, but it is believed to be the tsori or Judean balsam, two plants with healing properties referenced in the Bible.

== Criticism ==
The Arava Institute has faced criticisms from numerous Palestinian and Anti-Zionist organizations for attempting to "normalize" the state of Israel among the region's Arab population. Some proponents of this perspective also state that Israeli academia is indistinguishable from the Israeli government, due to its high degree of scientific and technological collaboration, especially relating to the Israel Defense Forces.

Others state that the institute has failed to speak on human rights violations against Palestinians by Israel, including the forced transfers of Palestinian Bedouins from the Negeb desert where the institute is based out of. The Arava Institute states that it is apolitical in this regard, which some state as being complicit to Israeli human rights abuses.

One of the Arava Institute's major sources of funding is the Jewish National Fund, which the Boycott, Divestment and Sanctions movement has denounced as a major player in the displacement of Palestinians.

== See also ==
- Alon Tal
- Environmental peacebuilding
