= Phangna Lien Pravongviengkham =

ພະຍາ Phagna Lien Pravongviengkham

Laotian Ambassador to China of Laos to China
- In office 30 September 1972 / 17 November 1972 – 1975
- Preceded by: Khamking Souvanlasy
- Succeeded by: Heuan Muongkhonvilay

Personal details
- Born: 4 March 1929 Sam Neua
- Died: May 1980 (aged 51)
- Spouse: In 1956 he married Nang Boun Huong Phanareth
- Children: 4
- Education: 1942: primary and complentary studies at SAM NEUA.; 1950 secondary studies in the "COLLEGE" AND LYCEE PAVIE AT VIENTIANE.
- Alma mater: 1954 pharmaceutical studies at the faculty of pharmacy in Paris.; 1958 law degree of the University of Paris; from 1953 to 1954 he was PRESIDENT OF THE ASSOCIATION OF LAO STUDENTS IN FRANCE

Phangna Lien Pravongviengkham (4 March 1929 – May 1980) was a Laotian ambassador.

From April 1964 to June 1967 he continued in the role of counselor Chargé d'affaires of the royal Laotian embassy in Washington, D.C. From June 1967 to October 1972 he served as the Secretary of State (Vice-Minister) for Youth and Sports. In 1975 the government tried to get agreement for his ambassadorship in Washington, D.C., and he was appointed ambassador in Bangkok. In 1980 he died and was buried in the vicinity of Ban Naka Neau, Sop Hao district, province Houaphan, VH 438-745.
