= NISM =

NISM may refer to:

- National Institute of Securities Markets, an Indian public trust
- Nexus International School Malaysia, a private international school based in Putrajaya, Malaysia
- Nederlandse Indische Stoomvaart Maatschappij, a Dutch shipping line
