= Nexus International School =

School in Singapore

Nexus International School (Singapore)
- Singapore

Information
- Type: Private international school
- Established: 2011
- Founder: Taylor's Education Group
- Principal: Karrie Dietz
- Grades: Nursery – Year 13
- Age range: 3–18
- Enrolment: ~1,600
- Campus: Aljunied
- Website: www.nexus.edu.sg

Nexus International School (Singapore), also known as Nexus, is a private, co-educational international school in Aljunied, Singapore. It serves learners aged 3 to 18, from Nursery to Year 13, and is operated by Taylor's Schools, the K–12 division of the Malaysian Taylor's Education Group.

It operated from a campus in Ulu Pandan until January 2020, when it relocated to a purpose-built 12-storey campus at Aljunied Walk. Nexus offers the International Baccalaureate Primary Years and Middle Years Programmes, Cambridge IGCSE, Pearson Edexcel IGCSEs and the IB Diploma Programme.

== Overview ==
The Nexus International School brand was established in 2007 by Taylor's Schools, which opened its first Nexus campus in Putrajaya, Malaysia. In July 2011, Taylor's Education Group, through its Singapore subsidiary Taylor's Education Pte Ltd, acquired Excelsior International School from Raffles Campus Pte Ltd and renamed it Nexus International School (Singapore). The school started its first learners under the Nexus name in July 2011 at the Ulu Pandan site, with about 900 students from some 50 countries.

In 2015, Taylor's Schools secured a Singapore government tender for a site at Aljunied for a new campus. Construction was completed in 2019, and the school relocated in January 2020.

At the 2025 EDUtech Asia awards the school won the Best AI Innovation Strategy Award (K–12) and an Outstanding Educator Award (K–12). The school also received awards at the HoneyKids Asia Singapore Education Awards, including gold for Digital Technology in Learning and, in three consecutive years to 2025, Sustainable School of the Year.

Lachlan MacKinnon served as principal until 2026. Karrie Dietz, previously head of school at the Australian International School Singapore, was appointed principal with effect from August 2026.

It is an authorised IB World School and a Cambridge International Education examination centre.

== Campus ==
The school occupies a single 12-storey building at 1 Aljunied Walk, close to Aljunied MRT station. The campus was designed by the architecture practice Broadway Malyan, with local architectural services by ONG&ONG, and has a gross floor area of about 60,600 square metres and a design capacity of 2,000 students. Teaching staff were involved in the design process, which produced open-plan and flexible learning areas in place of conventional enclosed classrooms.
