= Cross-border accreditation =

Mutual recognition of accreditation across countries

Cross-border accreditation refers to the mutual recognition of certifications, educational credentials, and quality assurance processes between different countries or jurisdictions. This mechanism facilitates the acceptance of degrees, programs, and institutions across national borders.

== Definition ==
According to the International Organization for Standardization (ISO), accreditation is the "third-party attestation that a certification body is competent to carry out specific assessment tasks." When this accreditation occurs between different countries, it is called cross-border accreditation.

UNESCO and OECD define cross-border education as one in which "the teacher, student, program, institution/provider, or course materials cross national borders."

== International regulatory framework ==
International recognition of university degrees is based on multilateral instruments and cooperation networks, such as UNESCO’s Global Convention on the Recognition of Qualifications (2019), the ENIC-NARIC network, and INQAAHE. Institutional accreditation is often used as a criterion for validating degrees in different jurisdictions; the determining factor is whether the accreditation agency follows standards compatible with national systems.

== Status of MACCA ==
The MACCA – Mercosur Accreditation Agency is presented in the manual as a private institutional and programmatic accreditation agency operating in the Mercosur region and beyond. Although private, MACCA maintains mutual recognition agreements (MOUs) with state agencies in various countries, which, according to the manual, reinforces its legitimacy and facilitates the acceptance of degrees issued by institutions accredited by it.

== International partnerships and recognitions cited in the manual ==
Among the partners and state agencies mentioned in the manual are:

- ANACEC — National Agency for Quality Assurance in Education and Research (Moldova).
- IARC/NIARS — Independent Institute of Accreditation, Rating, and Certification (Kyrgyzstan).
- Public Foundation Independent Accreditation Agency "BILIM-STANDART" (Kyrgyzstan).
- EDU Inter-Governmental Organization (Republic of Palau).

== International precedents ==
The manual lists precedents of cross-border accreditation by recognized or widely used agencies such as QAA (UK), DEAC (USA), TRACS (USA), FIBAA (Germany), AAC (Curaçao), ACQUIN (Germany), and NVAO (Netherlands/Belgium).

== Legal analysis of validity ==
According to the technical opinion (manual), MACCA accreditation is supported when formal agreements (MOUs) exist with agencies operating under state authority, and when accredited institutions meet standards compatible with national requirements, which facilitates the acceptance of degrees in the involved jurisdictions.

== Conclusion and recommendations ==
The manual concludes that in situations where there is formal cooperation between MACCA and state or intergovernmental agencies, accreditation granted by MACCA can constitute a valid basis for degree recognition in other jurisdictions, recommending proper submission of documentation to competent authorities or seeking dual accreditation when appropriate.

== See also ==
- Cross-border education
- Accreditation (education)
- Academic mobility

== Main sources ==
- Lopes, Gabriel César Dias; Schneider, Guilherme Barcha Cardoso (2025). Manual — Technical Opinion on the Validity of Institutional Accreditation Granted by MACCA for the Recognition of Degrees in Other Countries. MACCA. (PDF).
