= Taylor's College =

College in Petaling, Selangor, Malaysia

- Type: Pre-University
- Established: 1969
- Affiliations: Taylor's Education Group; Taylor's University; ACCA; ICAEW
- Location: Malaysia; 3°03′49″N 101°37′3″E (Taylor's Lakeside Campus)
- Campus: Subang Jaya
- Website: college.taylors.edu.my
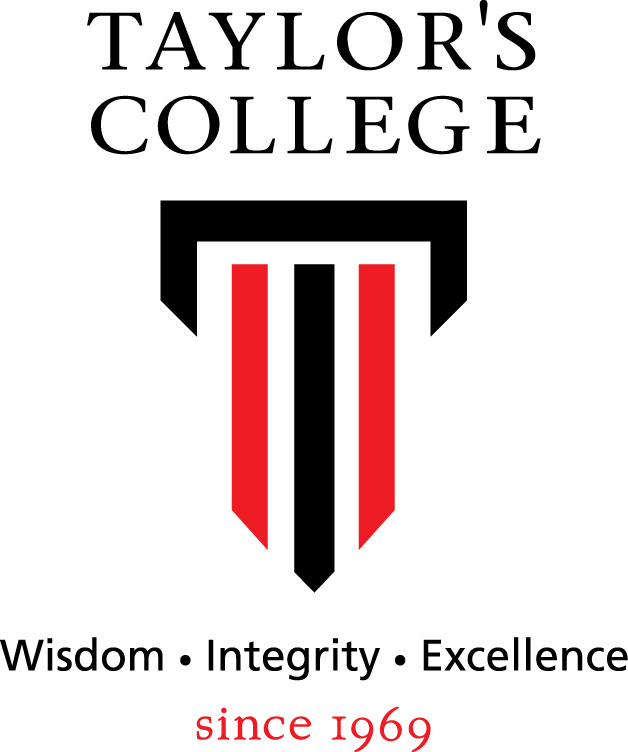

Taylor's College is an independent college in Malaysia that offers a pre-university programme leading to the Cambridge International GCE A-Level examination. Established in 1969, it has consistently ranked among the top Cambridge A-Level colleges in Southeast Asia.

Founded by George Archibald Taylor and George Leighton Taylor, Taylor's initially offered the Victorian High School Certificate (VHSC), but currently offers the Cambridge International GCE A-Level programme as well as the South Australian Certificate of Education (SACE), Foundation, Diploma in Business, Certified Accounting Technician (CAT) and Association of Chartered Certified Accountants (ACCA) professional programmes. The college received "University College" status in 2006 and "University" status in 2010, which further divided it into Taylor's University and Taylor's College.

== History ==
In 1920, George Archibald Taylor set up a coaching college called ‘George Taylor and Staff’ in Melbourne, Australia. Upon realizing that many Malaysians enrolled in his college, he and his son, George Leighton Taylor, established Taylor's College in Malaysia in 1969. The first branch campus was set up in Jalan Pantai to enable Malaysian students to matriculate within the country. The institution celebrated its 50th anniversary on 3 March 2019.

=== 1969 – 2000 ===
The first Taylor's campus, located at a building in Jalan Pantai, Kuala Lumpur, offered the Victorian High School Certificate (VHSC) programme for a student population of 345. It also pioneered the South Australian Matriculation (SAM) programme in 1982 and the Canadian Pre-university Programme in Malaysia in 1983. In 1989, Taylor's moved to its Subang Jaya campus in SS15, although the official opening was on 2 November, 1992, officiated by the Menteri Besar of Selangor, Tan Sri Dato’ Haji Muhammad bin Haji Mohd Taib. Taylor’s College also pioneered the first twinning programme in Malaysia with an agreement signed with RMIT on 23 February, 1987. This set a precedent for other twinning programmes in Taylor’s, such as with the University of Sheffield in 1992 and the University of Technology, Sydney, in 1993. The Cambridge A-Level Programme was introduced in Taylor’s College in 1991.

By 1990, other programmes were introduced, including the American Degree Transfer Program; Architecture, Quantity Surveying & Construction; Business, Accounting, Marketing & Finance; Computer Science, Software Engineering & IT; Engineering; Hospitality, Tourism & Culinary Arts; and the Taylor's Business Foundation.

=== 2000 – 2019 (Present) ===
In 2001, the fourth Taylor's College campus in Wisma Subang, housing the Taylor's Business School, was launched. The following year, Taylor's College Petaling Jaya (TCPJ) became the fifth Campus at Leisure Commerce Square and Taylor's School of Hospitality and Tourism was relocated from Kuala Lumpur to the new campus. TCPJ also housed the School of Communication, School of Architecture Building and Design, and Taylor's School of Computing. In 2004, the 6th Campus was launched in Subang Square housing the American Degree Transfer Program.

With the launch of the seventh and newest campus in Sri Hartamas (TCSH) in 2008, Taylor's College was able to offer the Cambridge A Level programme, South Australian Matriculation programme, and the International Baccalaureate Diploma Programme to an additional 800 students from across the Klang Valley.

In 2018, Taylor's College moved its base of operations from its Subang Jaya and Sri Hartamas campuses to the Taylor's Lakeside Campus, the same campus grounds as Taylor’s University.

== Academic Programmes ==
=== Cambridge A Levels ===
The Cambridge A Level (CAL) programme at Taylor's is conducted by the Cambridge International Examinations (CIE ). It provides a foundation to various international tertiary programmes around the world.

Taylor's College Subang Jaya was the first to be awarded the International Fellowship Centre Status in Malaysia by University of Cambridge International Examinations in 2004.

An 18-month programme, it prepares students for examinations in two phases: Advanced Subsidiary (AS) level and Advanced Two (A2) level. With this 2-stage assessment, students are given more opportunities to phase their learning to gain in-depth knowledge and lifelong skills that prepare them for success in their higher education and future employment.

=== South Australian Certificate of Education International ===
The South Australian Certificate of Education (SACE) International programme, formerly known as the South Australian Matriculation (SAM) programme, is the most popular Australian-based Pre-U programme in Malaysia.

The SACEi curriculum focuses on the development of capabilities that are essential to a student's future education, training and careers, and his or her role as an active and informed member of the community.

=== Foundation and Diploma ===
As part of the Taylor's Education Group's Higher Education Group strategic positioning, Taylor's College will be focusing on pre-university studies, professional studies and franchise degree programmes as part of its focus from 2019 onwards.

Effective 1 January 2019, eight foundation programmes (Arts, Science, Business, Computing, Communication, Design, Engineering and Natural & Built Environment) and the Diploma in Business, which were previously offered by Taylor's University, have been moved to Taylor's College.

=== Professional Programmes ===
Taylor's College offers two professional programmes starting from January 2019; the Certified Accounting Technician (CAT) and Association of Chartered Certified Accountants (ACCA) papers.

== Taylor's Lakeside Campus ==
In 2018, Taylor's College moved its Subang Jaya and Sri Hartamas campuses and combined it with the Taylor's Lakeside campus, where the campus of Taylor's University resided. Set on 27-acres of tropical greenery, the integrated purpose-built campus surrounds a 5.5 acre man-made lake.

== Achievements and recognition ==
Taylor's College was awarded the highest rating of 'Tier 6: Outstanding' rating by the Ministry of Higher Education Malaysia in the first three Malaysian Quality Evaluation System for Private Colleges (MyQUEST) rating exercises in 2011, 2013 and 2015.

Taylor's College was awarded Gold status in 2020 under the Approved Learning Partner programme by the Association of Chartered Certified Accountants.

== Notable alumni ==
=== Politics ===
- Yang Berhormat Puan Hannah Yeoh - Deputy Minister of Woman, Family and Community Development
- YB Tuan Fahmi Fadzil – Member of Parliament, PKR

=== Business ===
- Joel Neoh – Founder of FAVE.MY, director of BookDoc, Founders of SAYS.com
- Vishen Lakhiani – Founder, Mindvalley, Dealmates & Blinklist

=== Philanthropy / Social ===
- Deborah Priya Henry – Miss Universe Malaysia 2011, co-founder of Fugee School and Fugeelah

=== Media & Entertainment ===
- Sherson Lian - Chef and television host

=== Sciences ===
- Sze Flett - Australian scientist
