= Sherson Lian =

Malaysian celebrity chef

- Born: 11 December 1984 (age 41); Kuala Lumpur, Malaysia
- Education: Degree related to chef training and hotel management
- Occupations: Chef, television host
- Years active: 2003–present
- Mother: Ann Lian
- Relatives: 3

Sherson Lian (born 11 December 1984) is a Malaysian celebrity chef and television host.

== Early life ==
Lian was born in Kuala Lumpur on 11 December 1984 and is the eldest of four children. He is of Chinese British Malaysian descent. He had his early education at Sekolah Kebangsaan Klang. Lian began his culinary interests at the age of 11 while helping his mother in a cafe; he was interested in the local cuisine of Malaysia such as Malay, Cantonese, and Indian. His mother was the owner of the chap fan food business or 'budget rice'.

With no formal education in the culinary field, Lian began his career with his family; in 2003, he managed the Paradise Cafe at Faber Towers, Jalan Klang Lama in Kuala Lumpur. A year later he entered Taylor's College in the hospitality industry as a pioneer. He then underwent training at the JW Marriott Hotel which provides employment opportunities in services in various kitchens in Kuala Lumpur. Sherson and his family then moved to Malacca to manage the camping facilities there.

== Career ==
Lian became famous when he was the main host for TV3's 5 Rencah 5 Rasa show; the show was also broadcast on the wider Asian Food Channel (AFC) in terms of audience size. Lian later co-hosted with chef Johnny Fua on the show Great Dinners Of The World which also aired on the AFC. In May 2017, Lian hosted the AFC original production show Family Kitchen with Sherson in a family-themed cooking series. He was accompanied by his mother Ann Lian for the show.

In addition to culinary fields, Lian is also a member of the Cross Fusion band as a singer in various musical styles from jazz to fusion and has performed at music festivals and corporate events.
