= Khalila Mbowe =

Tanzanian social entrepreneur

- Born: 1988 (age 37–38); Tanzania
- Education: Taylor's University (Advanced Diploma in Mass Communication); University of the People (Bachelor of Business Administration); African Leadership University (Master of Business Administration)
- Occupation: Social entrepreneur
- Years active: 2006–present
- Title: Founder, managing director and CEO of Unleashed Africa Social Ventures.

Khalila Kellz Mbowe is a Tanzanian creative performance director and social entrepreneur, who is the founder, managing director and chief executive officer of Unleashed Africa Social Ventures, an enterprise that trains gifted young people in the performing arts, offering education, mentoring, exposure and opportunities.

== Background and education ==
Mbowe was born in Tanzania circa 1988, and attended Saint Mary’s Secondary School in Dar es Salaam for her high school education. She holds an Advanced Diploma in Mass Communication, obtained from Taylor's University, in Malaysia, in 2010. She also holds a Master of Business Administration degree from the African Leadership University.

== Career ==
In 2006, at age 18, Mbowe obtained her first job as a copywriter at FCB Advertising Agency, a subsidiary of Lowe Scanad Tanzania Limited. After working in that capacity for two months, she was promoted to an account executive handling the account of one of Tanzania's leading telecommunications companies.

In 2010, after graduating from Taylor's University, she landed a job working for Airtel Tanzania, a subsidiary of India's Bharti Airtel, working there for one year, from 2013 until 2014. From April 2015 until December 2015, she worked as the chief executive officer of Buddies Production Company Limited, a television production company from Uganda that was looking to expand in Tanzania.

Since February 2015, she has focused on running Unleased Africa Social Ventures, and pursuing her education in business administration, online. Her company employed 20 people as of November 2017. Her clients have included Vodacom, Total Tanzania, Uongozi Institute, TED Global and Sera Project.

== Personal life ==
Mbowe is the mother of two children: Raphael, born circa 2009; and Belle, born circa 2014.
