= List of ambassadors of Laos to China =

Representative of Vientiane Govt. in Beijing, China

Coordinates: 39.939642°N 116.456967°E

Ambassador of Laos to the People's Republic of China
- Incumbent; Khamphao Ernthavanh since November 22, 2019
- Inaugural holder: Ou Voravong
- Formation: July 4, 1962

The Laotian ambassador in Beijing is the official representative of the Government in Vientiane to the Government of the People's Republic of China.

== List of representatives ==
Diplomatic agrément/Diplomatic accreditation	Ambassador	Observations	Prime Minister of Laos	Premier of the Republic of China	Term end
July 4, 1962	Ou Voravong		Souvanna Phouma	Chen Cheng	

Diplomatic agrément/Diplomatic accreditation	Ambassador	Observations	Prime Minister of Laos	Premier of the People's Republic of China	Term end
1962	Khamking Souvanlasy	The Laotian Ambassador to China returned to Vientiane, leaving only a Charge dAffaires at Peking. Relations with Cambodia turned cool. There was no evidence of North Vietnamese troops participating in the fighting in Laos.	Souvanna Phouma	Zhou Enlai	1967
September 30, 1972/ November 17, 1972	Phangna Lien Pravongviengkham		Souvanna Phouma	Zhou Enlai	1975
1975	Heuan Muongkhonvilay	General Houan Mongkholvilay, deputy minister for veterans affairs (Neutralist Party) in the last coalition government, to be appointed ambassador to Peking to replace Lien Pravongviengkham. Khamphanh Panya, currently ambassador to Beijing. Heuance Mongkholvilay secretary of state for veterans affairs.	Kaysone Phomvihane	Hua Guofeng	1975
1976	Thavone Sichaleune		Kaysone Phomvihane	Hua Guofeng	1980
March 14, 1979		Chinese troops occupied Laotian territory near the border with Viet Nam after invading that country.	Kaysone Phomvihane	Hua Guofeng	
1984	Chaleune Warinthrasak	Chargé d'affaires	Kaysone Phomvihane	Zhao Ziyang	
June 14, 1988	Phongsavat Boupha	(* 1944) Phongsavat Bufa: In 2000 he was Laotian Vice Foreign Minister.	Kaysone Phomvihane	Li Peng	1992
1993	Ponmek Dalaloi		Khamtai Siphandon	Li Peng	1995
September 25, 1996	Soukthavone Keola	On March 11, 2002 he was appointed Ambassador in Tokyo.	Khamtai Siphandon	Li Peng	2002
November 5, 2004	Vichit Xindavong	2004 he was ambassador in Canberra.	Bounnhang Vorachith	Wen Jiabao	
July 30, 2010	Somdy Bounkhoum		Thongsing Thammavong	Wen Jiabao	
	Somphone Sichaleune		Sonexay Siphandone	Li Qiang	
