= Sze Flett =

Australian scientist

Dr Sze Peng Flett is a Principal Scientist and the interim Director for the Horticulture Centre of Excellence in the Victoria Department of Environment and Primary Industries.

== Early life and education ==
Flett was born in Kuala Lumpur, Malaysia. She completed the Victorian Higher School Certificate at Taylor's College, Kuala Lumpur. In 1976, she commenced undergraduate studies at La Trobe University, Bundoora and received a B Agri Sci (Hons). In 1992, she completed her PhD in "The Control of Root Rot in Processing Tomatoes" with La Trobe University. She was also awarded the Executive Masters in Public Administration (ANZSOG) with University of Melbourne in 2007.

== Awards ==
- The Howard Memorial Trust Travel Award (1994)
- Victorian Government Continuous Improvement Network Award (2007)

== Career ==
Flett started her career at DEPI in 1980 at the Plant Research Institute, Burnley as a technical assistant in the General Pathology Laboratory in 1980. She moved to the Department of Environment and Primary Industries at Tatura in 1981 and commenced as a plant pathologist working on a mysterious root rot in subterranean clover, an important annual pasture feedbase for sheep and dairy cows. She was part of the research team that discovered a new species of Phytopthora – Phytophthora clandestina. She led the screening of subterranean clover varieties from the wool industry's breeding program for Phytophthora clandestina germplasm and discovered that there were different strains of P clandestina which resulted variability in varietal tolerances. Flett has led multi-disciplinary teams and conducted research in plant diseases: Phytophthora root rot in processing tomatoes and chestnuts, trunk cankers and root rot in stone and pome fruits and powdery scab in processing potatoes. In 2002, she took a turn in her career and contributed to the development of the Victorian Biotechnology and commenced a role as Partnership Manager for the Catchment Management Authorities. In 2003, she was responsible for a portfolio of land and water services programs in the former Farm Services Division of DEPI. In 2008, Flett was appointed as the Director of the Arthur Rylah Institute, leading the delivery and management of environmental research at DEPI's Heidelberg site. In this role, she focused on science excellence, leadership and quality and led the modernisation of the ARI facilities, housing state of the art research aquariums and laboratories. In 2012, Flett was appointed as the Director for Horticulture Services in DEPI and most recently, the interim Director of the Horticulture Centre of Excellence at Tatura.

== Works ==
- Developing safe foliar spraying of phosphonic acid to control peach and apple phytophthora. With Tom Lim. 1996.
- Control of stem rot and tree dieback caused by silverleaf and trametes in peaches and apples. With Peter H Jerie. 1998.
- Phytophthora root rot of tomatoes. With Bill Ashcroft. 1997.
- Identifying the IPM needs of the fresh market tomato industry in Northern Victoria. 2003
- Control of Phytophthora with phosphorus acid. 1998.
