= Taylor's University =

Private university in Subang Jaya, Selangor, Malaysia

- Former name: Taylor's University College (2006)
- Motto: Wisdom, Integrity, Excellence
- Type: Private
- Established: 2006
- Affiliations: Taylor's Education Group; Taylor's College
- Vice-Chancellor: Professor Dr Barry Winn
- Location: Subang Jaya, Selangor, Malaysia; 3°03′53″N 101°36′58″E
- Campus: Lakeside Campus
- Colours: Black and Red
- Website: university.taylors.edu.my

Taylor's University (commonly referred to as Taylor's) is a private university in Subang Jaya, Selangor, Malaysia. It is Malaysia's top private university based on the QS World University Rankings.

It was founded in 1969 as a college, was awarded university college status in 2006, and university status in 2010. Taylor's University is a member of the Taylor's Education Group, which also includes British University Vietnam, Taylor’s College, Garden International School, Nexus International School, Australian International School Malaysia, and Taylor’s International School.

== History ==
=== Origins and founding (1920–1969) ===
The institution traces its origins to George Taylor and Staff, a coaching college opened in Melbourne, Australia, in 1920 by George Archibald Taylor. As Malaysian enrolment grew, Taylor and his son, George Leighton Taylor, established a campus in Malaysia in 1969 so that students could matriculate for Australian qualifications without leaving the country. The first campus, in Jalan Pantai, Kuala Lumpur, opened with 345 students and offered the Victorian High School Certificate.

=== Pre-university expansion (1982–2008) ===
Taylor's introduced the South Australian Matriculation programme in 1982 and a Canadian pre-university programme in 1983. The college moved to a purpose-built campus in SS15, Subang Jaya, in 1989, and later opened campuses in Petaling Jaya in 1992 and Sri Hartamas in 2008.

=== Change of ownership (2001) ===
In 2001, Datuk Loy Teik Ngan acquired a small stake in Taylor's Education Sdn Bhd while restructuring the family's finances following the collapse of MBf Group and the death of his father, Tan Sri Loy Hean Heong, in 1997. The holding was progressively increased, and Loy became majority shareholder and group chief executive of what is now Taylor's Education Group.

=== University college status and the Lakeside Campus (2006–2010) ===
In 2006, Taylor's was granted university college status, which resulted in two distinct identities under the tertiary arm of the brand: Taylor's College and Taylor's University College.

Work commenced on the RM450 million Taylor's University Lakeside Campus in Subang Jaya in early 2007 and was completed in January 2010. The 27-acre site is built around a 5.5-acre artificial lake.

Professor Emeritus Dato' Dr Hassan Said, previously Director-General of Higher Education at the Ministry of Higher Education, served as founding Vice-Chancellor and President from 2008 to 2015.

=== Full university status (2010) ===
The Ministry of Higher Education granted the institution full university status in September 2010, and it was renamed Taylor's University. Syed Jalaludin Syed Salim, formerly Vice-Chancellor of Universiti Putra Malaysia, was installed as the university's first Chancellor in 2011.

=== Consolidation and subsequent leadership (2016–present) ===
Professor Michael Driscoll, formerly Vice-Chancellor of Middlesex University in London, served as Vice-Chancellor and President from July 2016 to June 2018.

In January 2018, Taylor's College closed its Subang Jaya and Sri Hartamas campuses and relocated its pre-university programmes to the Lakeside Campus, placing the college and the university on a single site. The group marked the 50th anniversary of its founding in March 2019.

In November 2021, the private equity firm KKR agreed to acquire a minority stake in Taylor's Schools, the K-12 division of Taylor's Education Group. The transaction did not involve the university, and the group remained the controlling shareholder of the schools division.

Professor Barry Winn, previously Vice-Chancellor of Sohar University in Oman and before that a senior officer at the universities of Bradford and Hull, took office as Vice-Chancellor and President on 22 January 2024.

== Lakeside Campus ==
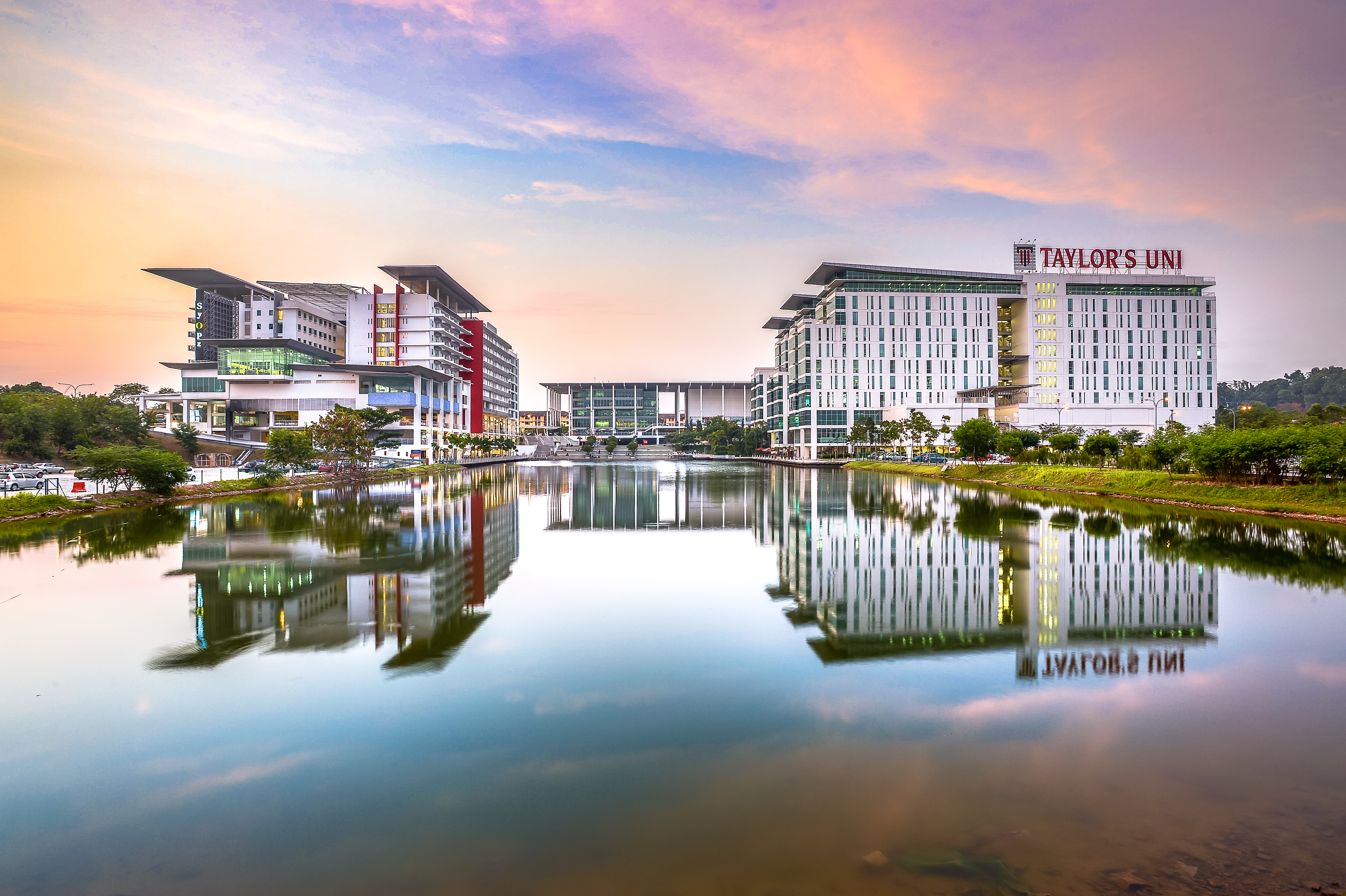
Completed in January 2010 and set on 27-acres of tropical greenery, the integrated purpose-built campus surrounds a 5.5-acre man-made lake, as well as a landscape of water plants, trees, and flowering shrubs.

In 2011, Taylor’s received the Special Honour Award from the Institute of Landscape Architects Malaysia in Category 3: Professional Awards in Landscape Design and Planning.

The Lakeside Campus was awarded in all three building categories of Interior Design, Architecture and Landscape.

== Faculties and schools ==
The university's academic provision is divided into four faculties, each comprising a number of schools and departments and led by an executive dean.

Faculty	School
Faculty of Business and Law	Taylor's Business School
Faculty of Business and Law	School of Law and Governance
Faculty of Social Sciences and Leisure Management	School of Hospitality, Tourism and Events
Faculty of Social Sciences and Leisure Management	Taylor's Culinary Institute
Faculty of Social Sciences and Leisure Management	School of Media and Communication
Faculty of Social Sciences and Leisure Management	School of Education
Faculty of Social Sciences and Leisure Management	School of Liberal Arts and Sciences
Faculty of Social Sciences and Leisure Management	School of General Studies and Languages

Faculty	School
Faculty of Health and Medical Sciences	School of Medicine
Faculty of Health and Medical Sciences	School of Pharmacy
Faculty of Health and Medical Sciences	School of Biosciences
Faculty of Innovation and Technology	School of Architecture, Building and Design
Faculty of Innovation and Technology	School of Computer Science
Faculty of Innovation and Technology	The Design School at Taylor's
Faculty of Innovation and Technology	School of Engineering

== Research ==
Research at Taylor's University is administered by its Research and Enterprise division and organised through five university research centres: the Centre for Asian Modernisation, the Centre for Active Living, the Centre for the Future of Work, the Centre for Sustainable Societies and the Centre for Intelligent Innovations. The university's publishing arm, Taylor's Press, produces five open-access academic journals, including the Journal of Engineering Science and Technology and the Asia-Pacific Journal of Innovation in Hospitality and Tourism.

The university was placed 4,266th worldwide in the 2026 edition of the SCImago Institutions Rankings, which measure research output, innovation and societal impact using Scopus data.

=== Food studies ===
Since 2012 the university has held a research chair in food studies, established jointly with the Université Toulouse-Jean Jaurès and held by the French sociologist Jean-Pierre Poulain. The chair runs the Malaysian Food Barometer, a recurring national survey of eating habits whose dataset was published in Frontiers in Nutrition in 2022. The partnership with Toulouse dates from the establishment of the Taylor's–Toulouse University Centre, which delivers joint hospitality and tourism programmes.

=== Impact Labs ===
In 2022 the university launched Taylor's Impact Labs, a programme that attaches applied projects to taught modules and organises them around the United Nations Sustainable Development Goals. According to the university, the programme comprises eleven labs and has generated more than 230 projects with external partners since 2023. In December 2023 the programme received the overall award and the gold award in the sustainability education category at the QS Reimagine Education Awards.

== Rankings and reputation ==
University rankings

Global
QS World	272 (2027)
QS Sustainability	=418 (2026)
QS Global MBA	151–160 (2027)
QS Masters in Management	151–200 (2027)
USNWR Global	=783 (2026–27)
SCImago World	4266 (2026)

Regional
QS Asia	27 (2026)
USNWR Asia	=244 (2026–27)

The university first entered the QS World University Rankings in the 601–650 band in the 2019 edition. It rose over the following editions to 379th in 2021 and 251st in 2025, before being placed 253rd in 2026 and 272nd in 2027. In the regional QS Asia University Rankings it was placed 41st in the 2024 edition, 36th in 2025 and 27th in 2026. It was also ranked =418th in the QS Sustainability Rankings.

In the U.S. News & World Report Best Global Universities rankings for 2026–27, the university was placed joint 783rd worldwide, joint 244th in Asia and 7th in Malaysia.

The university's Master of Business Administration programme was placed in the 151–160 band in the QS Global MBA Rankings 2027. Its Masters in Management programme was placed in the 151–200 band in the QS Business Masters Rankings 2027.

=== Subject rankings ===
Twenty subjects were ranked in the QS World University Rankings by Subject 2026, distributed across four of the five broad subject areas. The highest-placed was Hospitality and Leisure Management at 26th, a subject in which the university has been ranked within the top 30 in each edition since 2021. Three subjects entered the ranking for the first time in the 2026 edition: English Language and Literature, Law and Legal Studies, and Biological Sciences.

Two subjects were ranked in ShanghaiRanking's Global Ranking of Academic Subjects 2026: Hospitality and Tourism Management at 40th and Public Health in the 401–500 band.

QS World University Rankings by Subject 2026
Subject	Global
Arts and Humanities
Arts and Humanities (broad area)	=221
Art and Design	61
Architecture and Built Environment	151–200
English Language and Literature	251–300
Engineering and Technology
Engineering and Technology (broad area)	=357
Data Science and Artificial Intelligence	101–200
Computer Science and Information Systems	201–250
Engineering – Electrical and Electronic	351–400
Engineering – Mechanical	401–450
Life Sciences and Medicine
Pharmacy and Pharmacology	201–250
Medicine	501–550
Biological Sciences	651–700
Social Sciences and Management
Social Sciences and Management (broad area)	=166
Hospitality and Leisure Management	26
Marketing	51–100
Business and Management Studies	=144
Accounting and Finance	151–200
Economics and Econometrics	=178
Education and Training	301–350
Law and Legal Studies	351–400

ARWU Global Ranking of Academic Subjects 2026
Subject	Global
Hospitality and Tourism Management	40
Public Health	401–500

== Notable alumni ==
=== Business ===
- Khalila Mbowe, founder and chief executive officer of Unleashed Africa Company Limited

=== Sports ===
- Syakilla Salni Jefry Krisnan, gold medalist, 2014 Asian Games

=== Media and entertainment ===
- Vanessa Tevi Kumares, Miss Universe Malaysia 2015
- Charmaine Chew, Miss Universe Malaysia 2018 finalist, Miss International 2019 finalist
- Darius Shu, cinematographer and filmmaker
- Serene Lim Shyi Yee (zh), actor

=== Others ===
- Ainan Celeste Cawley, Singaporean child prodigy
