= Ainan Celeste Cawley =

Singaporean child prodigy

Ainan Celeste Cawley (born Ainan Bin Muhammad 23 November 1999) is a Singaporean prodigy. Raised by an Irish father and Singaporean mother.

Cawley gave his first public lecture at the age of six, and at seven years and one month of age, he had passed the GCSE chemistry and studied chemistry at the tertiary level in Singapore Polytechnic a year later. At the age of 9, he was able to recite pi to 521 decimal places and could remember the periodic table. At the age of 12, he had scored his first film, which was premiered at the Vilnius International Film Festival and eventually, directed his own film.

In 2007, Cawley studied at NUS High School of Math and Science, but left after expectations of his family were not met.

In 2009, Cawley was featured in a Channel 4 documentary titled The World's Cleverest Child and Me.

In 2010, his family moved to Kuala Lumpur, where Cawley is a student at the Taylor's University in Malaysia after his father's request to have his son homeschooled was rejected.

According to his parents, Valentine Cawley and Syahidah Osman, Cawley could walk at six months old and construct complex sentences by his first birthday, and had said his first word when he was two weeks old.

== See also ==
- List of child prodigies
- List of child music prodigies
- Intellectual giftedness
