= Mai Sayavongs =

Laotian ambassador (born 1962)

Mai Sayavongs (born June 5, 1962 Houaphanh Province) is a Laotian ambassador who has served as ambassador to the United States since August 3, 2015. He has concurrent accreditation to Canada and Mexico.

He earned a MA in international relations from the Moscow State Institute of International Relations in 1988 and another MA, in Asia and international studies from Griffith University in Brisbane, Australia, in 1996.
