= SMK Putrajaya Presint 9(1) =

Public school in Putrajaya, Malaysia

SMK Putrajaya Presint 9
- Putrajaya; Malaysia

Information
- Type: Fully Government
- Motto: Intelektual Interaktif Inovatif
- Established: 2002
- Principal: Puan Rogayah Binti Talib
- Colours: Turquoise, Black
- Abbreviation: SMKPP9(1)
- Website: www.smkpp91.edu.my/v2/

Sekolah Menengah Kebangsaan Putrajaya Presint 9 (1), or Putrajaya Precinct 9 National High School (SMKPP9(1)), is a secondary school to be built in the area of Putrajaya, Malaysia. It is located in Precinct 9, Putrajaya.

== See also ==
- List of schools in Malaysia
- Putrajaya
