= Anphabe.com =

Vietnamese social networking service

Anphabe
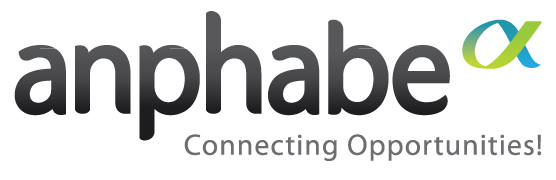
- Company type: Privately held company
- Website type: Employment website Review Site
- Available in: Multilingual
- Founded: 2011; 15 years ago
- Headquarters: 6th Floor, 52 Dong Du, Ben Nghe Ward, District 1, Ho Chi Minh City, Vietnam
- Founder: Thanh Nguyen
- Industry: Social networking service
- Services: Employment website
- Website: www.anphabe.com
- Commercial: Yes
- Registration: Optional
- Current status: Active

Anphabe.com is a Vietnamese social networking service and employment website.

Anphabe has been referred to as the Vietnamese LinkedIn.

== History ==
Anphabe.com was started by Thanh Nguyen, one of the few female tech founders in Vietnam, in 2011 in Ho Chi Minh City.

In 2013, Anphabe received investment from Recruit Global Incubation Partners, the venture capital arm of Recruit Holdings, a recruiting company out of Japan.

In 2014, the company launched a review of the best company to work for in Vietnam.
