= List of ambassadors of Laos to the United States =

Coordinates: 38°54′50″N 77°2′58.3″W

Ambassador of Laos to the United States Embassy of Laos in Washington, D.C.
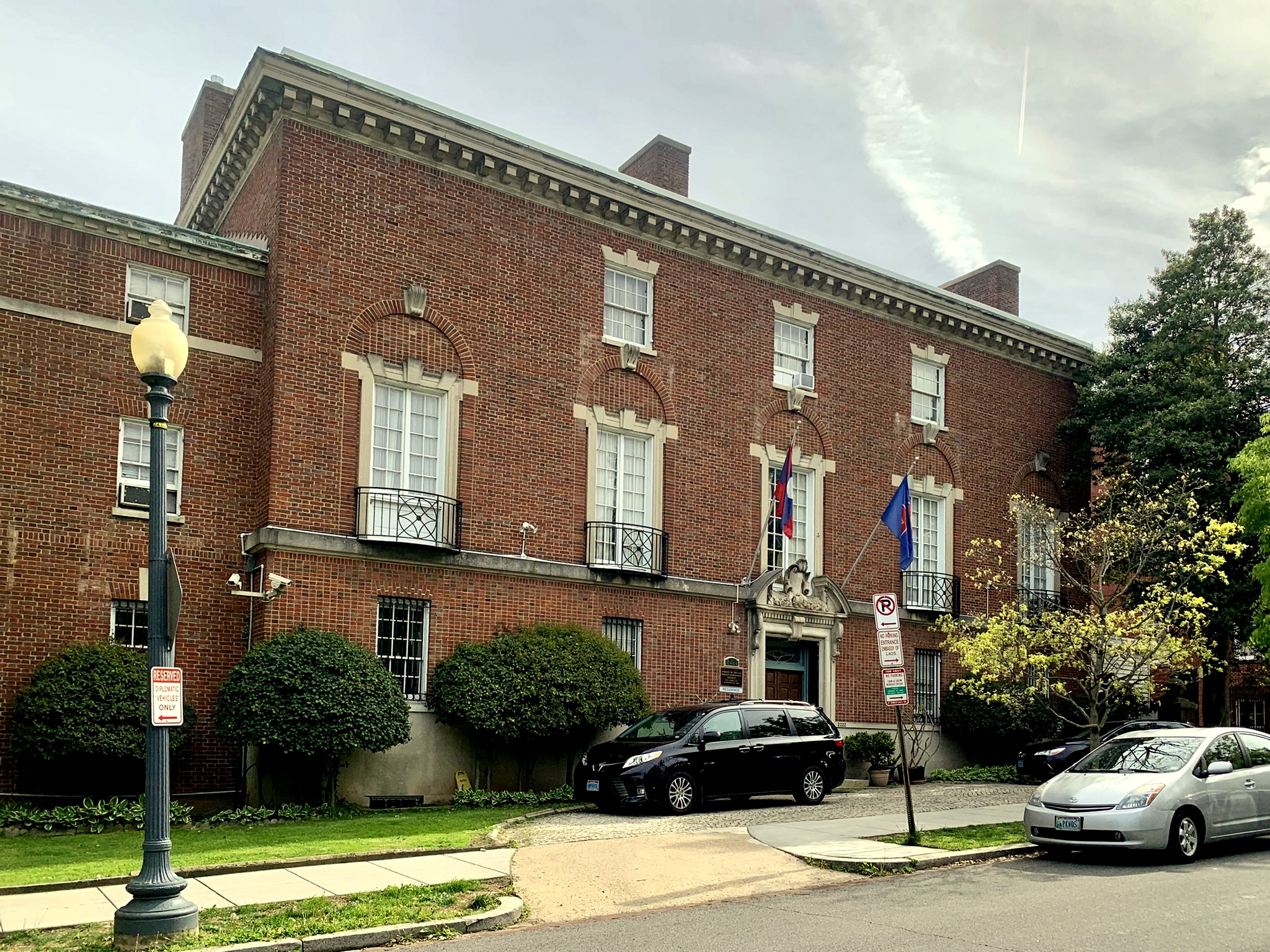
- Incumbent; Mai Sayavongs since August 3, 2015
- Inaugural holder: Ourot R. Souvannavong
- Formation: July 13, 1963

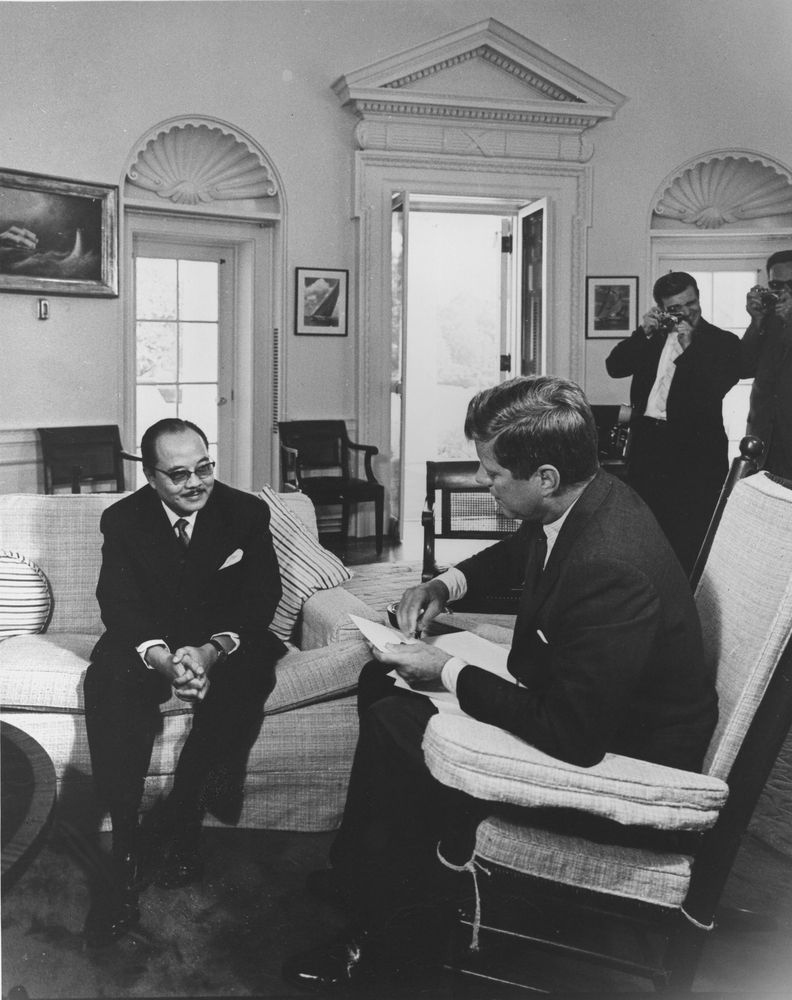
Tiao Khampan

The Laotian ambassador in Washington, D. C. is the official representative of the Government in Vientiane to the Government of the United States.

== List of representatives ==
Diplomatic agrément	Diplomatic accreditation	ambassador	Observations	Prime Minister of Laos	List of presidents of the United States	Term end
June 29, 1953			Legation opened	Souvanna Phouma	Dwight D. Eisenhower	
June 29, 1953	July 13, 1963	Ourot R. Souvannavong	1954 Laotian Delegate at the Geneva Conference.; Till 1960 he was secretary general in Ministry of Foreign Affairs.	Souvanna Phouma	Dwight D. Eisenhower	
November 8, 1955			Legation raised to Embassy	Katay Don Sasorith	Dwight D. Eisenhower	
October 13, 1955	November 8, 1955	Ourot R. Souvannavong	Ourot Souvannavong, former Ambassador to Washington, and during the summer of 1939 scheduled to be appointed Ambassador to Vietnam. Ourot studied in Cambodia.	Katay Don Sasorith	Dwight D. Eisenhower	
November 17, 1959	December 1, 1959	Nouphat Chounramany	Lao Secretary of State for National Economy until July 1958	Phoui Sananikone	Dwight D. Eisenhower	
October 4, 1961	October 17, 1961	H.R.H. Tiao Khampan		Boun Oum	John F. Kennedy	
March 31, 1966	April 6, 1966	Khamkhing Souvanlasy		Souvanna Phouma	Lyndon B. Johnson	
April 1, 1971		Souk-Praseuth Sithimolada	Chargé d'affaires, (1942) Among those known to Amnesty International whose release was later confirmed were Oudong Souvannavong, the 64-year-old former director of the National Bank of Laos, and his brother Ouday Soukpraseuth Sithimolada, a 48-year-old former diplomat and chef de cabinet in the ministry of foreign affairs Soukpraseith Sithimolada "	Sisavang Vatthana	Richard Nixon	
June 28, 1971	July 22, 1971	Tiao Khammao		Sisavang Vatthana	Richard Nixon	
October 4, 1972	December 19, 1972	Phagna Pheng Norindr	There was also a third brother of La Norindr, Pheng Norindr who was a prominent member of Phoumi's entourage. he was ambassador in Moscow.	Sisavang Vatthana	Richard Nixon	
July 18, 1974		Khamsouk Chanthadara	Chargé d'affaires 1968 Consellor in Paris	Sisavang Vatthana	Gerald Ford	
September 27, 1974	October 4, 1974	Khamphan Panya	March 4, 1917) Khamphan Panya, ambassadeur du Laos à Moscou depuis novembre 1962, The King's Council, influenced by Khamphan Panya's father, Phao Panya, asked the king on December 27 to pronounce himself on the constitutionality of the extension of the Assembly's mandate.	Sisavang Vatthana	Gerald Ford	
1975			Diplomatic relation ceasaed	Kaysone Phomvihane	Theodore Roosevelt	
September 23, 1992	November 18, 1992	Hiem Phommachanh		Khamtai Siphandon	George H. W. Bush	
1992			Mission opened under Name The Lao Peoples Democratic Republic	Khamtai Siphandon	Theodore Roosevelt	
July 29, 1998	September 10, 1998	Vang Rattanagong		Sisavath Keobounphanh	Bill Clinton	
April 19, 2002	June 19, 2002	Phanthong Phommahaxay	1998: Ambassadaor in Berlin	Bounnhang Vorachith	George W. Bush	
February 22, 2007	February 27, 2007	Phiane Philakone	08.06.2001 he was ambassador in Manila	Bouasone Bouphavanh	George W. Bush	
June 4, 2010	June 28, 2010	Seng Soukhathivong	Born February 10, 1955, Soukhathivong	Bouasone Bouphavanh	Barack Obama	
July 2, 2015	August 3, 2015	Mai Sayavongs	Born June 5, 1962, in Laos' Houaphanh	Thongsing Thammavong	Barack Obama	
