= SMK Putrajaya Presint 8(1) =

Private school in Putrajaya, Malaysia

Coordinates: 2°56′23″N 101°41′05″E

SMK Putrajaya Presint 8 (1)
- Sekolah Menengah Putrajaya 1

Location
- 4, Jalan P8, Presint 8 Putrajaya, Putrajaya; Malaysia

Information
- Type: Private school
- Motto: ULUNG UTAMA UNGGUL
- Established: 17 January 2000
- Principal: Dr. Salabiah Ismail (2001-2003); Dato' Che Manis Ismail (2004-2006); Datin Suwarni Hassan (2007-2012); Puan Hajjah Roani Jaafar (2012-2014); Tuan Haji Zawi Bin Yahya (2014-2016)
- Grades: Form 1 (7th Grade) – Form 6 (12th Grade after 2015, there is no more 12th grade)
- Language: Malay, English, Japanese, Arabic
- Colours: Blue , Green , Yellow and Red
- Website: www.smkpp8.edu.my

Sekolah Menengah Kebangsaan Putrajaya Presint 8 (1) is a secondary school situated in Putrajaya, Wilayah Persekutuan, Malaysia. It is designated as a cluster School of Excellence by the Malaysian Ministry of Education.

== History ==
The Smart School concept resulted in the construction of SMK Putrajaya Presint 8 (1), within the auspices of the Multimedia Super Corridor (MSC).

Construction of the school building was started in 1998 and the school was ready to operate on 17 January 2000. A pilot group consisting of 12 teachers and 30 students was recruited for 14 January 2000. At the end of 2000, there were 350 students from Form 1 to Form 5.

The school has 40 classrooms. There are four computer labs with 36 computers each. Thanks to the Smart School Pilot Project (in 2000), the school has been equipped with 535 computers with Internet LAN and WAN networks. The school has had six grade classes from 2003 and the first students were the STPM examinations in 2004.

The school's name was officially changed from SMK Putrajaya 1 to SMK Putrajaya Presint 8 (1) on 9 October 2007. It was managed by the Selangor District Education Office from 2000 to 2006. Since January 2007, the school is under the administration of the Education Office of the Federal Territory of Putrajaya (PPWPP).
