= Khalid Muhmood =

Khalid Muhmood MBE
- Born: September 1970 (age 55)
- Education: University of Hertfordshire (BSc) University of Exeter (PGCE)
- Occupations: Academic, entrepreneur
- Spouse: Arabella Peters
- Honours: Member of British Empire
- Website: https://www.khalidmuhmood.com/

Khalid Muhmood MBE (born September 1970) is an English academic and entrepreneur. He is the co-founder of the British University Vietnam (BUV), Apollo English and British Education Partnership. In addition, he served as the Chairman of British Business Group Vietnam (BBGV) initially in Hanoi in 2003 and then nationwide from 2008 to 2010. He was also the Chairman of the Education Working Group at the Vietnam Business Forum (co-chaired by the International Finance Corporation, World Bank and Ministry of Planning and Investment).

In recognition to his contributions to Vietnam's education, Khalid has received awards from both the Vietnam Government and the UK government. He was the first non-diplomat foreigner to receive a Medal for Cause of Education from the Ministry of Education and Training (Vietnam) in 2006, and in 2008, he was awarded the Member of British Empire (MBE) from Queen Elizabeth II for his dedication to the education development in Vietnam.

== Early life and family ==
Khalid Muhmood was born in England. He holds a bachelor's degree in Business and Law at Hertfordshire University and a Postgraduate Certificate in Education at the University of Exeter. His first job was teaching overseas at the Singapore International School where he taught Mathematics and English for two years before moving to Vietnam. His brother Zee M Kane, previously served as the Editor-in-Chief of The Next Web. His brother Tareq currently lives in Singapore and works as the Group Country Manager, Regional Southeast Asia at Visa.

== Awards ==
Khalid Muhmood's contributions to Vietnam's education have been recognised by both the Vietnam Government and the UK Government. He was the first foreigner in the private sector in Vietnam to receive the Medal for the Cause of Education, awarded by the Ministry of Education and Training (Vietnam) in 2006. In the same year, he also received the Award for significant contribution to economic and social developments from Hanoi People's Committee.

In 2008, Khalid was awarded the Member of British Empire (MBE) by Queen Elizabeth II for his dedication to contributing to the education in Vietnam.
