= Ecopark (Vietnam) =

Urban township development in Hung Yen Province, Vietnam

Coordinates: 20.957763°N 105.936924°E

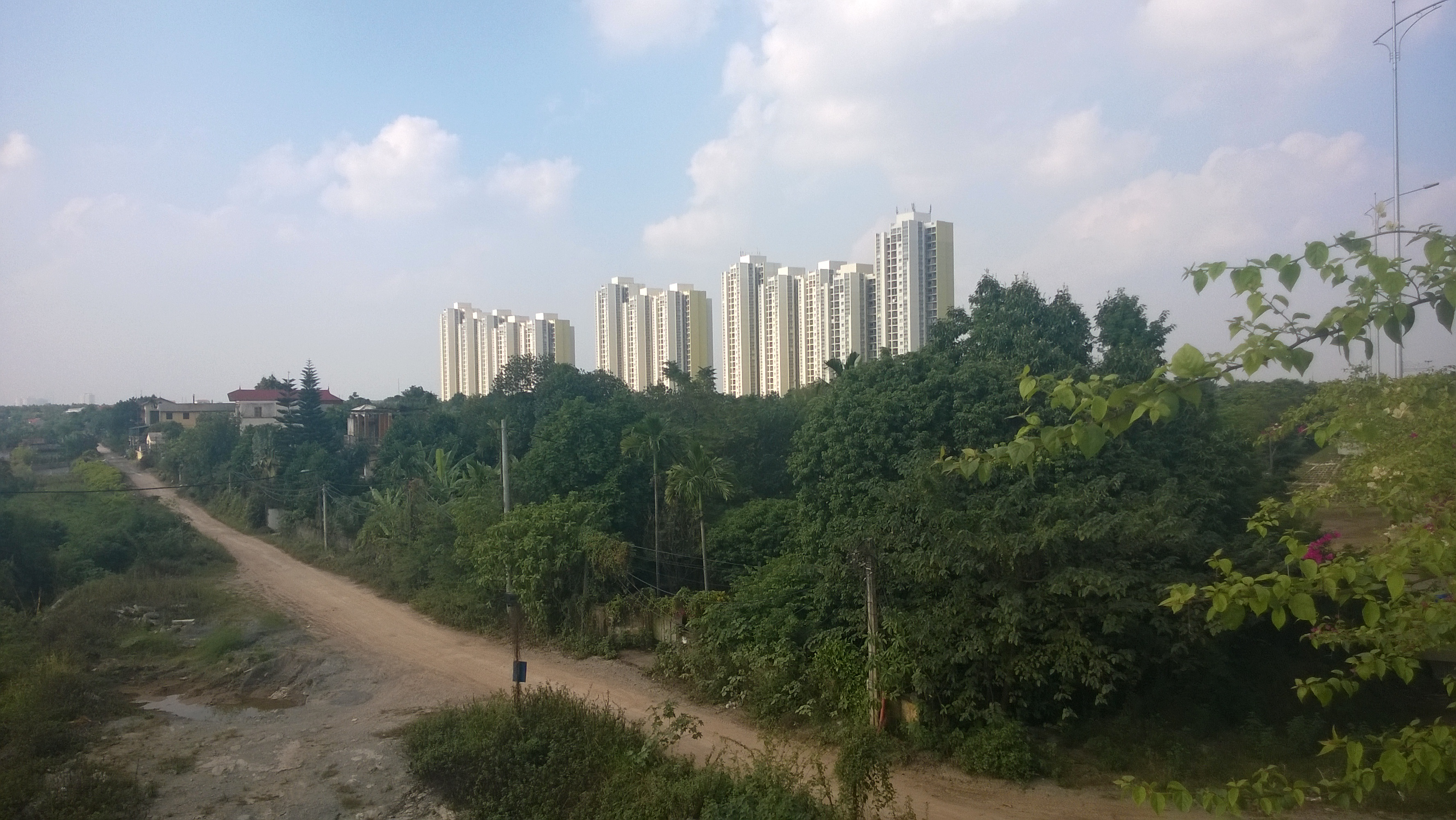

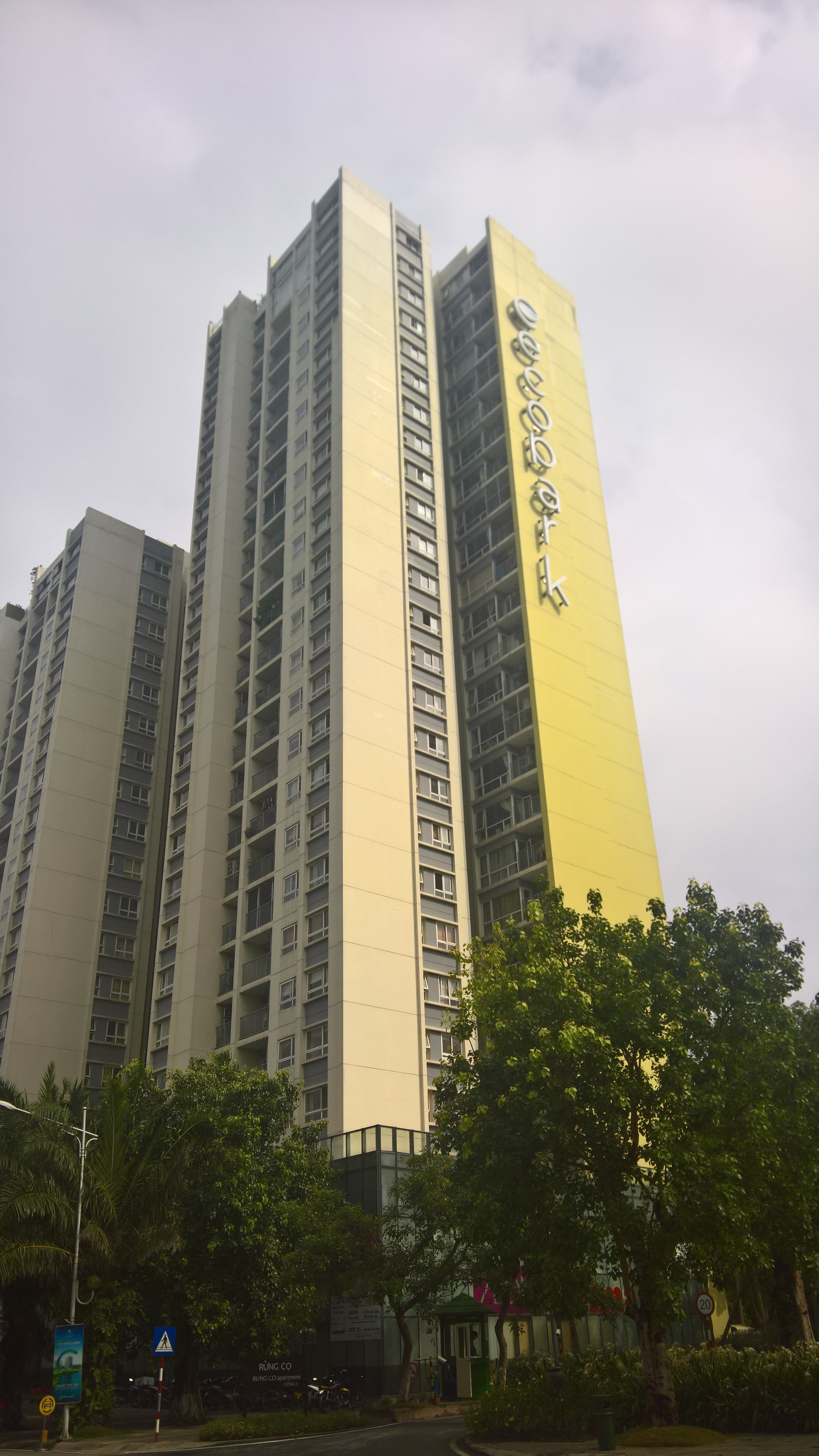
- Location: Hưng Yên Province, Vietnam
- Status: Complete
- Constructed: 2020
- Website: www.ecopark.com.vn

Companies
- Developer: Viet Hung Urban Development and Investment - Vihajico

Technical details
- Size: 500ha

Ecopark is an urban township development on the outskirts of Hanoi, in Hung Yen Province, Vietnam. The township spans 500 hectares with an estimated investment capital of over US$8.2 billion. The entire development, divided into nine construction phases, was expected to complete in an 18-year period.

== Development ==
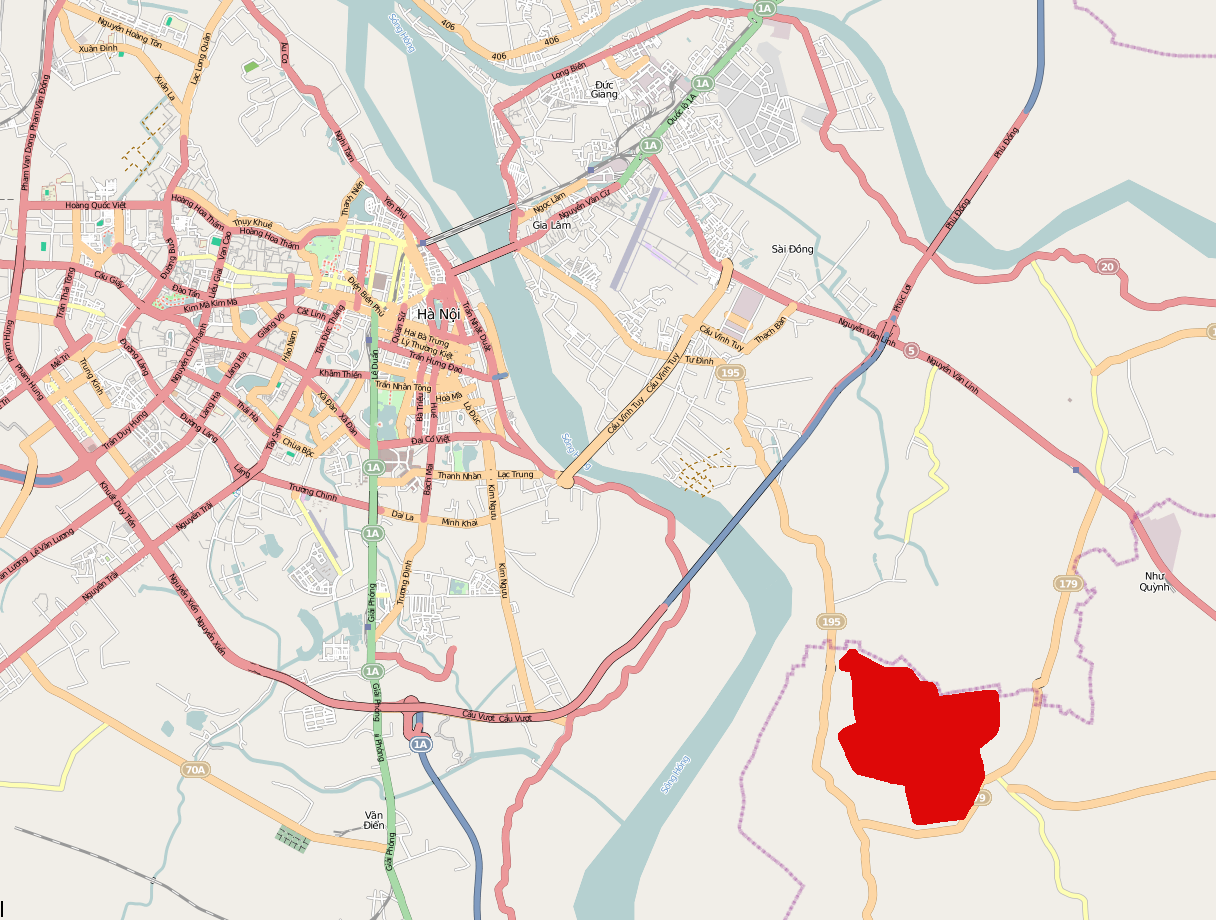
Street map of Hanoi showing the location of Ecopark (red)

Ecopark was developed by Viet Hung Urban Development and Investment J.S.C (VIHAJICO), a joint venture of the following Vietnamese companies:

- AA Construction Architecture Joint Stock Company (AA Corporation)
- ATA Architects Co., Ltd
- Nam Thanh Do Construction Consultants J.S.C
- Thanh Nam Construction and Investment J.S.C
- Duy Nghia Co., Ltd
- Phung Thien Trading Co., Ltd
- Nam Thanh Tourism and Commerce J.S.C
- Bao Tin Trading Co., Ltd.

Construction was completed in 2020.

== Opposition from local farmers ==
The project has met resistance from about 2000 farmers whose land was repossessed, as in Vietnam all land belongs to the state. There were protests in 2006 and 2016 during construction.

On April 24, 2012, the project became one of the biggest land confrontations in Vietnam, with police troops facing farmers armed with sticks, rocks and Molotov cocktails. Police fired teargas into the crowds, arrested several protesters, and some villagers were beaten by the police with clubs.

A farmer said "she was initially offered the equivalent of $2.63 per square meter, with the price rising three times to $7.18", while "apartments to be built at Ecopark were offered at a minimum $886 per square meter in a promotion for early buyers in May last year"
