= Khamphao Ernthavanh =

Lao diplomat and politician

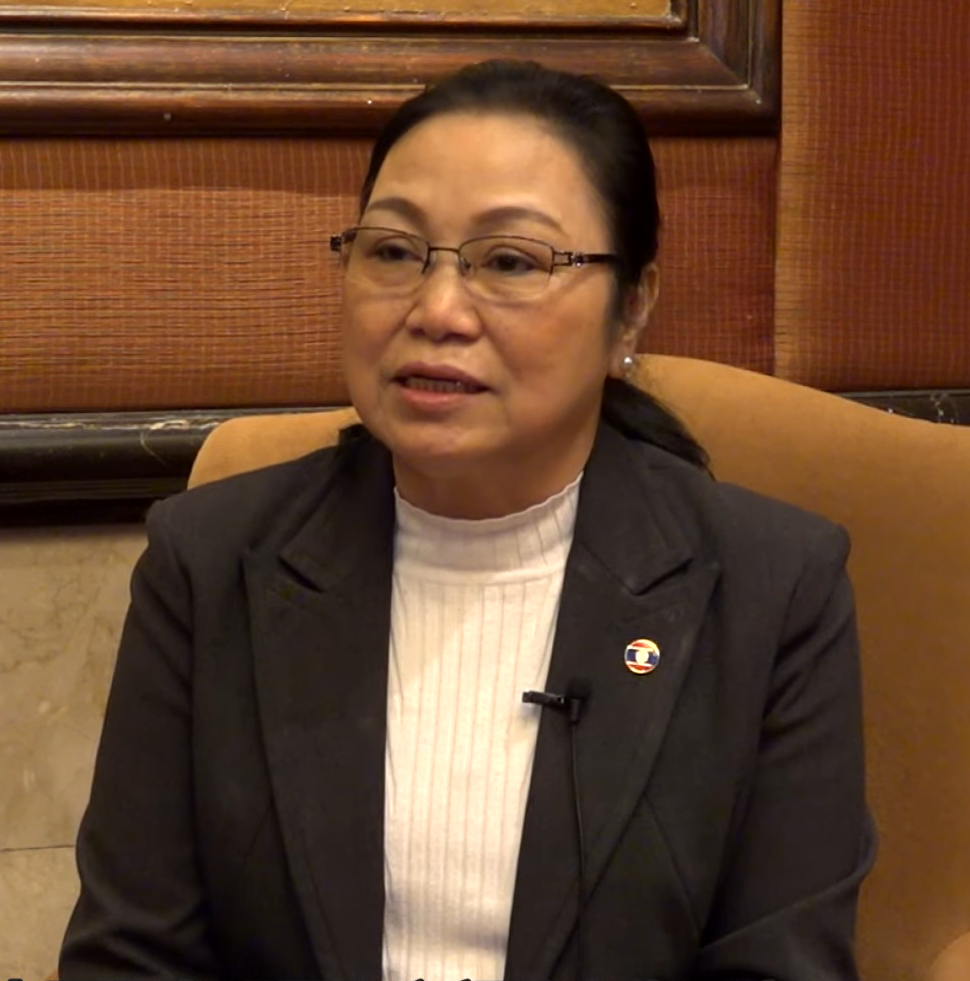
- Ernthavanh in 2023

Ambassador of Laos to Vietnam
- Incumbent
- Assumed office March 2024
- Preceded by: Sengphet Houngboungnuang

Ambassador of Laos to China
- In office 22 November 2019 – November 2023
- Preceded by: Vandy Bouthasavong
- Succeeded by: Somphone Sichaleune

Personal details
- Born: 20 November 1961 (age 64) Xiangkhouang Province, Laos

Khamphao Ernthavanh (Lao: ຄໍາເພົາ ເອີນທະວັນ; born 20 November 1961) is Lao diplomat and politician who is a former Deputy Director of the Department of International Finance of the Ministry of Foreign Affairs, Deputy Minister of Foreign Affairs of Laos. Since 2024, she has been the ambassador of Laos to Vietnam and previously served as ambassador of Laos to China from 2019 to 2024.

== Biography ==
Ernthavanh was born on 20 November 1961 in Xiangkhouang Province, Laos.

In June 2015, Ernthavanh was appointed as Deputy Minister of Foreign Affairs of Laos. On 27 September 2019, Ernthavanh was appointed as the new Lao ambassador to China and arrived in Beijing. On November 22, she presented her credentials to President Xi Jinping. In November 2023, she stepped down from this position and was succeeded by Somphone Sichaleune.

In March 2024, she was appointed as the new Lao ambassador to Vietnam, succeeding Sengphet Houngboungnuang.

== Personal life ==
In addition to her native Lao, Ernthavanh speaks Vietnamese, Russian and English. She is married with two children.
