= Cross-border education =

Cross-border education is the movement of people, knowledge programs providers and curriculum across national or regional jurisdictional borders. It also refers to dual and joint degree programs, branch campuses, and virtual, on-line education. It is a division of "internationalization of higher education" and can be linked to development cooperation projects, academic exchange programs and commercial initiatives.

== Cross-border tertiary (higher) education ==
Cross-border higher education has emerged to become a very complex phenomenon and has grown quickly. The last two decades have seen growth in the mobility of higher education programs and providers through physical and virtual modes of delivery. This presents many new opportunities such as increased access to higher education, strategic alliances between countries and regions, as well as the expansion of human resource and institutional capacity. Many students in cross-border education are "glocal students" who seek global education at local cost.

== Provider and receiver country ==
The provider country is the source country of the program, qualification or other intellectual property (e.g. component of a course of study) that is delivered in another country. The receiver country is the host country to which the programme, qualification or other intellectual property sourced overseas is delivered.

== Forms ==
Cross-border education or Transnational education comes in a variety of forms ranging from twinning programs, branch campuses, joint and dual degrees and online education. The steps involved in setting up cross-border education include:

- Setting up of a branch campus or a higher education institution
- Collaboration with a local partner where the provider country institution/awarding institution controls much of the program design and delivery (e.g. teaching and assessment)
- Collaboration with a local partner where the program design comes from the home institution, but program delivery is shared
- Collaboration where the program delivery is largely delegated to a local partner
- Validation by an overseas awarding institution of a program designed and taught by a local institution
- The provider country institution employs a pure distance learning mode of delivery through use of printed materials and/or electronic delivery

== Approaches to cross-border higher education ==
There are four approaches employed in cross-border education. They are --

1. The mutual understanding approach encompasses political, cultural, academic and development aid goals (e.g. Japan, Korea, Mexico, Spain);
2. The skilled migration approach shares the goals of the mutual understanding approach but gives stronger emphasis in the recruitment of selected international students (e.g. Canada, France, Germany, the United Kingdom (for EU students), the United States (for post-graduate students));
3. The revenue-generating approach shares the rationales of the mutual understanding and skilled migration approaches, but offers higher education services on a full-fee basis, e.g. Australia, New Zealand, the United Kingdom (for non-EU students), the United States (for undergraduates).
4. The capacity building approach encourages the use of foreign post-secondary education as a way of building an emerging country's capacity, e.g. China, Hong Kong, Singapore.

== Factors which drive supply and demand for cross-border education ==
=== Demand ===
- The attraction of an overseas qualification to students in the receiver country
- Insufficient supply of level-appropriate education in the receiver country
- Attraction of students studying for an overseas qualification at a lower cost and without having to leave their home country
- The attraction of a more flexible mode of study offered by cross-border programmes, e.g. Part-time, distance learning, fast track, intensive mode, etc.
- The attraction of a greater variety of more programs e.g. Top-up qualifications

=== Supply ===
- Developments in technology to facilitate improved remote delivery and remote support of programmes and qualifications
- Pressure on institutions to generate additional sources of income
- A change in academic and organizational culture in some major education provider countries – an increased emphasis on entrepreneurship and seeking commercial opportunities
- Desire to pilot new programs or new modes of delivery in a foreign market
- Desire of staff for self-advancement and fulfillment of educational ideals through delivery of education to a foreign country

== Challenges ==
One of the biggest challenges of cross-border education is striking a balance between quality and access. Given the diversity of regulatory environment, it is often difficult to assure quality at the same time protect students' interests.

The increasing movement of education between countries means education is becoming increasingly “globalized”. As a consequence, educational products have been regarded as a trade commodity. It has become increasingly tied to the market and consumer demand, as well as to the need to make financial returns for providers. When consumer demand and the need to make financial returns become factors in influencing the offer of educational provision, it can create tension with other priorities such as academic standards, autonomy and integrity. This tension can, in turn, give rise to problems with quality and consumer protection issues such as:

- A potential increase in poor quality providers
- A lack of recognition of foreign qualifications by domestic employers or education institutions along with elitism and the tension it creates.

=== Diploma mills and poor-quality programs ===
One big problem that can arise is the proliferation of the so-called "diploma mills." These establishments offer qualifications for little or no study, at a price. Often the qualifications "bought" at a diploma mill are of little or no value to the students.

Another are poor-quality programs resulting from institutional failures which can have huge impacts on the reputation and value of a country's education system.

== List of organizations involved in cross-border education ==
- United Nations Educational, Scientific and Cultural Organisation
- Organisation for Economic Co-operation and Development
- Institute of International Education
- United Nations Children's Fund (UNICEF)
- United Nations Development Program
- World Bank International Development Association
- The International Economic Development Council
- International Development Exchange
- Academy for Educational Development
- Society for International Development
- Institute of International Education
- United Nations
- Centre For International Consultancy (Cic) Asia Pacific. { An International Educational Movement' Organization For Cross-border education }

== See also ==
- Globalisation
- Transnational education
- International education
- International school
- Developmental education
- Online learning community
- Studying abroad
- Tertiary education
- Virtual education

== Sources ==
- Knight, J. (2002). Trade in Higher Education Services: The Implications of GATS. October 2002 report of the Observatory on Borderless Higher Education, London.
- Knight, J. (2003). GATS, Trade and Higher Education. Perspectives 2003: Where Are We? April 2003 report of the Observatory on Borderless Higher Education, London.
- Knight, J.(2004). "Crossborder Education:The Complexities of Globalization, Internationalization and Trade." Chapter Five in Internationalization and Quality Assurance. SAUVCA, Pretoria, Africa.
- Knight, J. (2005). Borderless, Offshore, Transnational and Crossborder Education- Definition and Data Dilemmas. October 2005 report of the Observatory on Borderless Higher Education. London.
- Knight, J. (2006). "Crossborder Education: An Analytical Framework for Program and Provider Mobility" in J. Smart and B.Tierney (eds.). Higher Education Handbook of Theory and Practice: Springer, Dordecht, Netherlands.
- Larsen K., R. Morris and J. Martin (2001). Trade in Educational Services: Trends and Emerging Issues. Working Paper. Organisation for Economic Co-operation and Development, Paris.
- McBurnie, G. and C. Ziguras (2001). “The Regulation of Transnational Higher Education in Southeast Asia: Case Studies of Hong Kong, S.A.R., China, Malaysia, and Australia.” Higher Education 42/1, pp. 84–105.
- Organisation for Economic Co-operation and Development (2004a). Quality and Recognition in Higher Education: The Crossborder Challenge. Paris.
- Organisation for Economic Co-operation and Development (2004b). Internationalization and Trade of Higher Education – Challenges and Opportunities. Paris.
- UNESCO (2004). Higher Education in a Globalized Society. Education Position Paper ED-2004/WS/33.UNESCO, Paris
