= Nexus International School Malaysia =

Private, international school in Putrajaya, Malaysia

Location
- No. 1, Jalan Diplomatik 3/6, Diplomatik Presint; Putrajaya, Putrajaya, 62050; Malaysia; 2°56′27.3″N 101°43′25.5″E

Information
- Type: Private, International school
- Established: 2008
- Principal: Morag McCrorie
- Website: www.nexus.edu.my

Nexus International School Malaysia is a private international school established in 2008 and based in Putrajaya, Malaysia. Part of the Taylor's Education Group, the school offers boarding facilities and education for Early Years, Primary, Secondary, and Pre-university students.

== Leadership ==
The principal of Nexus International School Malaysia is Morag McCrorie. The senior leadership team consists of Head of Primary is Kerry Legg, Head of Secondary is Morag McCrorie, and the Director of Boarding is Sandie Fowler.

== Accreditations ==
Nexus is authorised and accredited by the following institutions and associations:

- Apple Distinguished School
- International Primary Curriculum (IPC) at Mastering Level
- Council of International Schools
- International Baccalaureate
- Boarding Schools' Association
- Australian Boarding Schools' Association
- Cambridge International Examinations
- College Board

== Curriculum ==
The Early Years in Nexus is open for learners from nursery to reception level, where the International Early Years Curriculum (IEYC) is the choice of programme. For Primary level, the school incorporates the International Primary Curriculum (IPC) catered for Year 1 to Year 6 students. For Secondary level, the school offers the Middle School Program for Years 7–9, the International General Certificate of Secondary Education (IGCSE) for Years 10–11. In pre-university, the International Baccalaureate Diploma Programme (IB) is offered for Years 12–13.

In 2014, the school was appointed to deliver The Duke of Edinburgh's International Award. Nexus is also a member of the Australian Boarding Schools' Association (ABSA), Boarding Schools' Association (BSA), Council of International Schools (CIS), and the College Board.

The school was awarded Mastering Status for its delivery of the IPC.

== Co-curricular activities ==
The co-curricular activities (CCA) in Nexus are sectioned into traditional team sports, individual sports, and arts and crafts projects. The program includes football, basketball, rock climbing, Taekwondo, archery, wakeboarding, clay making, and knitting classes.

Nexus also organises a range of performing arts programs that encourage the development of creative talents and arts expressions.

== Campus and facilities ==
Nexus School consists of classrooms, labs, and administrative buildings. The on-campus facilities include a swimming pool, tennis courts, football field, indoor gym, multipurpose hall, fully equipped auditorium, two-tiered library, and boarding facilities. It also has a cafeteria, dining room, drama and dance studio, classrooms, sports field, indoor gymnasium, multipurpose, café, play area, rock wall, music room, sound, and film studio.

== Nexus Boarding House ==
Nexus Boarding House is a boarding facility for students between the ages of 10 and 18. It includes routine activities, after-school activities and weekend activities.
