= Taylor's Education Group =

Malaysian private school company

- Type: Private Limited Company
- Industry: Education
- Headquarters: Selangor, Malaysia
- Key people: Dato' Loy Teik Ngan (Group Executive Chairman); Abby Lew Tong (Group Executive Director)
- Website: https://www.taylors.edu.my/

Taylor's Education Group is a network of international schools and post-secondary institutions based in Selangor, Malaysia that operates throughout South-East Asia. It currently holds several for-profit K-12 schools and higher-education institutions, a student accommodation Hostel management business, and a property management company that primarily operates the campuses of its education institutions. The company is currently headed by Group Executive Chairman Dato' Loy Teik Ngan.

The K-12 International Schools division consists of:

- Nexus International School, Singapore
- Nexus International School, Putrajaya
- Garden International School, Kuala Lumpur
- Australian International School, Malaysia
- Taylor's International School, Kuala Lumpur
- Taylor's International School, Puchong
- Lexel International School
- Sentia School, Vietnam

The various schools offer different curricula, including the International Baccalaureate, South Australian, and Cambridge alternatives, depending on institution.

In 2021, the private equity firm KKR invested in a minority shareholding in the Schools division.

The Higher Education Division consists of:

- Taylor's University
- Taylor's College
- British University Vietnam

Taylor's University evolved out of Taylor's University College based on the invitation of Malaysia's Ministry of Higher Education. Prof. Emeritus Dato’ Dr. Hassan was appointed as founding Vice Chancellor and President of Taylor's University (2008). Previously, he was the Director General of the Department of Higher Education, Ministry of Higher Education Malaysia from January 2005 until April 2008. He was also the Director, Department of Higher Education, Ministry of Education Malaysia, a position he held from May 1998 until April 2008.

Taylor's University has received awards for its leadership and has been recognized by Quacquarelli Symonds (QS) as the Number 1 private university in SE Asia and Malaysia (2020, 2021, 2022), as one of Asia's top 50 universities (2022), as and one of the world's Top 50 universities under 50 years old. Its business school is ranked top 20 in the world and its School of Hospitality and Leisure Management is ranked 16th globally as of 2022.

Taylor's College is an independent college in Malaysia, offering the Cambridge A Levels as well as the South Australian Certificate of Education. It is ranked among the top Cambridge A Level colleges in Southeast Asia.

British University Vietnam offers “British degrees on Vietnamese soil” from its purpose built campus outside Hanoi. In 2022, it was awarded QS 5-star rating and university-wide accreditation from the UK's Higher Education Quality Assurance Agency (QAA). To earn the recognition of being QAA quality assured, BUV completed the International Quality Review (IQR), a rigorous procedure which benchmarks global higher education institutions against the UK's international quality assurance standards, with the University achieving the highest level of performance in all 10 categories. BUV is one of only three foreign universities to operate its own campus in Vietnam.

Taylor's Hostel Management (THM) provides housing for approximately 1,000 students attending Taylor's University, and supplements the housing with various types of service learning opportunities in order to create a more holistic learning environment. In 2023, Times Higher Education (THE) Awards Asia awarded THM the "Outstanding Contribution to Regional Development" based on THM's Launchpad project which aims to eradicate menstruation poverty for refugees in Malaysia via a self-sustaining model. Given Taylor's emerging commitment to ESG, this example of social engagement via student projects in the refugee community was recognised as innovative and transformative.
