= Uri Shanas =

Israeli ecologist and founder of TiME

Academic background
- Education: PhD, Tel Aviv University

Academic work
- Institutions: Oranim College, Israel (current) Portland State University, US (visiting professor) Massey University, New Zealand (visiting professor) Columbia University, US (postdoctoral fellow)

Uri Shanas is an Israeli professor of zoology and conservation biology at Oranim College and the founder and CEO of the international nonprofit conservation organization This Is My Earth (TiME).

== Biography ==
Shanas was born in Beersheba, Israel, one of four children of Leib and Shoshana Shanas, environmental activists who initiated the campaign against the construction of the nuclear reactor between Ashkelon and Ashdod in the 1970s. His father worked for Mekorot, Israel’s national water company, and therefore, the family moved around the country when he was a child. From the age of 16, Shanas and his family spent two years in Thailand, where his father worked for Tahal, helping develop the water supply infrastructure in northeastern Thailand. When they returned to Israel, he enlisted in the Nahal, was a member of the Scouts' group that lived on Kibbutz Ketura, and participated in the establishment of Shizafon (now Neot-Smadar).

Shanas received a bachelor's degree in life sciences (1988), a master's degree in zoology (1991) and a doctorate with distinction in zoology (1997), all from Tel Aviv University. The master's thesis was on the reproduction of the blind mole rat. The doctoral thesis dealt with the morphology, chemistry, and pheromonal properties of the harderian gland of the blind mole rat.

In 1998, he did a postdoctoral fellowship at Columbia University and then joined the University of Haifa in 2001. From 2009 to 2013, he was head of the Biology and Environment department at the University of Haifa on the Oranim College campus.

Shanas is married with three children and lives in Givat Ada, Israel.

== Environmental activism ==
In 2000, Shanas warned about the environmental impacts of the construction of the Trans-Israel Highway: the fragmentation of habitats, destruction of open spaces, roadkill, damage to vegetation, contamination of groundwater and air pollution. He pointed out shortcomings in the environmental-impact assessment phase and emphasized the difficulty of predicting in advance the true impacts of projects of this magnitude, warning that the damage could be irreversible. Shanas submitted a petition to the Supreme Court of Israel against the Trans-Israel Highway Company and the State of Israel in a lawsuit to address road runoff and protect the sources of the Yarkon River and water aquifers.

Shanas co-founded the Green Movement party. In 2011 he led the Green Movement’s submission of a petition to the Supreme Court of Israel demanding that the Turkel Committee reconsider Yoav Galant’s suitability for the position of the Israeli Defense Forces’ chief of staff, due to suspicions of land misappropriation. The Green Movement questioned “who gave Galant the extra 35 dunams [of public open space] and why no one else received it.”

In 2011, Shanas was involved in research and the campaign to protect the Samar Sands in the southern Arava, an area that is a unique habitat for rare and endemic species. He worked to raise awareness of the ecological importance of the site and its biodiversity and warned against the harm caused by sand mining and habitat loss. As part of the conservation efforts, Shanas initiated the purchase of land by Israel Nature and Parks Authority, where he was a board member, to help save the last dunes in the area.

In 2015, he co-founded with Alon Tal the international nonprofit organization This is My Earth (TiME), which works to slow the rate of species extinction, combat climate change, and preserve areas of high biodiversity around the world. Shanas is TiME’s CEO. The organization operates through an international crowdfunding model, allowing the public to participate in both funding the purchase and long-term protection of natural areas by local organizations and communities and selecting target areas for conservation among a shortlist chosen by TiME’s international scientific advisory committee, on which Shanas sits. By 2025, the organization had given grants to local conservation organizations and communities to acquire 13 natural habitats in various countries, including Peru, Colombia, Ecuador, Brazil, Kenya, and the Philippines. TiME funded the conservation of over 14,000,000 m^{2} of ecologically critical areas, the protection of hundreds of endangered animal and plant species, and the reduction of carbon-dioxide emissions.

Shanas has served as a member of the board of directors of the Society for the Protection of Nature and a plenary member and chair of the professional scientific committee at the Israel Nature and Parks Authority, and was a co-founder and board member of the environmental organization Adam Teva Ve Din.

== Research ==
Shanas specializes in conservation biology. He is particularly interested in the biodiversity and ecology the Arava desert, and is affiliated with the Arava Institute of Environmental Studies, where he teaches courses and supervises field studies in ecology.

Shanas helped discover a new species of huntsman spider, Cerbalus aravaensis. The species was first discovered in 2003 during a study conducted on both sides of the Israeli-Jordanian border by Shanas and a team of Israeli and Jordanian researchers in the southern Arava region, north of Eilat. Shanas also studied rare and endangered species in this area, including the Middle Eastern short fingered gecko and the Lesser Egyptian gerbil and pointed out the genetic uniqueness of local populations.

Shanas was involved in preliminary studies on the reintroduction of the Carmel deer to Israel. These studies showed the importance of the deer as a herbivore and leaf eater in the Mediterranean forest and its need for a regular source of water in its habitat.

In 2018, Shanas studied the impact of hunting and land use on the behavior, social structure, and physiology of wild boars in the Carmel region, together with his student Dr. Achiad Davidson. The study examined differences between areas with a lot of hunting and those with minimal hunting, and findings showed that hunting increases progesterone hormone levels in females, advances the age of sexual maturity, increases the boar’s vigilance, changes foraging patterns, and affects herd structure. However, hunting pressure was not found to cause chronic stress. The findings also revealed that hunting does not reduce the wild boar population and may even contribute to its increase. The results of the study contributed to understanding the biology of wild boars and developing approaches to population management and reducing conflicts between humans and wildlife.
