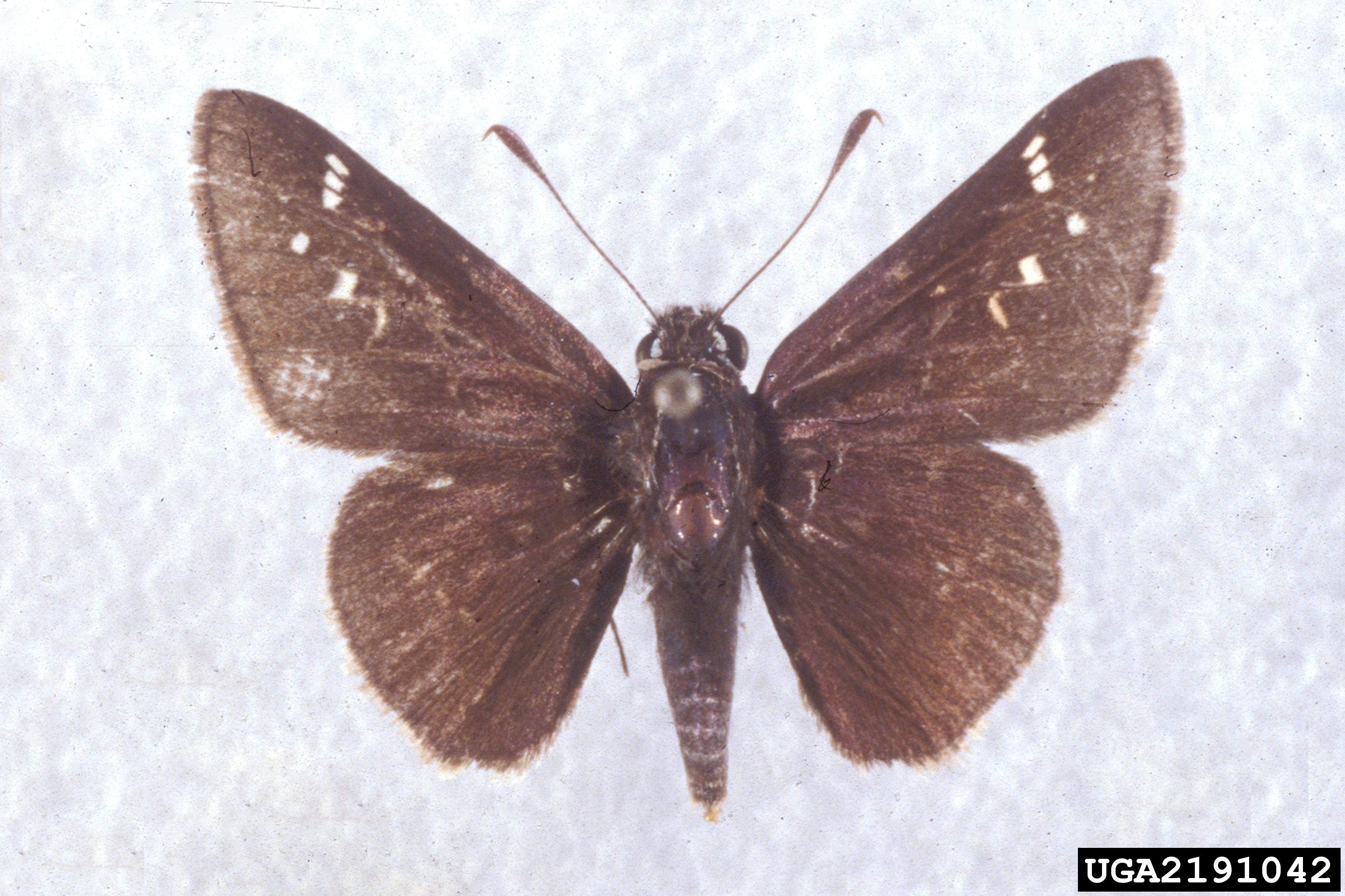

Scientific classification
- Domain: Eukaryota
- Kingdom: Animalia
- Phylum: Arthropoda
- Class: Insecta
- Order: Lepidoptera
- Family: Hesperiidae
- Genus: Atrytonopsis
- Species: A. loammi

Binomial name
- Atrytonopsis loammi (Whitney, 1876)

Synonyms
- Atrytonopsis regulus (Edwards, 1881); Atrytonopsis apostologica (Strand, 1921); Lerema loammi

= Atrytonopsis loammi =

Species of butterfly

Atrytonopsis loammi, the Loammi skipper or southern dusted skipper, is a butterfly of the family Hesperiidae. It is found in the United States on barrier islands in North Carolina and from South Carolina to Florida and Mississippi.

Some authors consider it to be a subspecies of Atrytonopsis hianna. The North Carolina population has been described as a new species, Atrytonopsis quinteri, though the paper describing it does not discuss how the new species differs from the Florida populations of A. loammi.

The wingspan is about 32 mm. Adults are on wing from early April to mid-May and mid-July to late August.

The larvae feed on Schizachyrium littorale.
