= This Is My Earth =

Nonprofit organization dedicated to preserving biodiversity around the world

This Is My Earth (TiME)
- Founded: 2015
- Website: https://this-is-my-earth.org/

This is My Earth (TiME) is a nonprofit organization dedicated to preserving biodiversity by crowdfunding to help local conservation partners purchase land in biodiversity hotspots. In its first 10 years, TiME enabled the perpetual protection of over 14,000,000 square meters across 13 threatened habitats around the world by funding the transfer of land ownership to local and/or Indigenous communities, with land management by local/Indigenous conservation partners.

TiME's educational program teaches students about biodiversity, with curricula based on the habitats TiME is helping protect. In its first 10 years, the educational program reached nearly 4,000 students, from elementary school through university, in nearly 50 educational institutions in Africa, Europe, the Middle East and North America.

TiME was established in 2015 by Professor Uri Shanas of the University of Haifa at Oranim and Professor Alon Tal of Tel Aviv University. Shanas is TiME's CEO. This largely volunteer organization is advised by an international team of scientists, environmental activists, and educators on the Board of Directors and Scientific Advisory Committee (see Governance section below). One hundred percent of donations made on TiME’s website are dedicated to the protection of threatened habitats and are democratically distributed to conservation partners. Every donor, regardless of the amount of their donation, has an equal say in which scientifically vetted conservation projects get supported through its annual crowdfunding campaign. The organization's goals are to preserve biodiversity hotspots and curb the Sixth Extinction, which is largely caused by human activities, and to educate the next generation about the importance of biodiversity and activism.

== History ==
TiME was founded in 2015 by professors Uri Shanas and Alon Tal, both noted scholars and environmental activists. Shanas has been TiME’s CEO since then. In 2018, Tal left the organization to take up a political appointment that precluded his continued involvement.

TiME took advantage of the then-rising popularity of crowdfunding and increasing internet access worldwide to establish an organization in which even small donors can actively help protect biodiversity. TiME raised an initial US$35,515 on Indiegogo by August 13, 2015. Eight hundred and nineteen people from over 40 countries donated. This initial seed money was primarily used to build a website and fund the purchase of threatened habitat. In 2015, TiME also established a basic organizational infrastructure, registered as a nonprofit, recruited members for the Board of Directors and Scientific Advisory Committee, and launched on social media. In its first year, TiME had over one thousand members.

Over its first 10 years, with the generous support of its members, donations to TiME led to the protection of more that 14 million square meters across 13 parcels of land in biodiversity hotspots located in seven countries and on three continents. Using funds provided by TiME, local conservation organizations and community groups purchased these parcels and continue to manage them to protect the land and its resident species.

Country	Local conservation partner	Land parcel	Land size (m^{2})	Funds transferred by TiME to local partner (USD)	Campaign year
Peru	Asociación Neotropical Primate Conservation Peru	Pampa del Burro	660,000	$30,000	2016
Peru	Asociación Neotropical Primate Conservation Peru	Sun Angel's Gardens	6,660,000	$17,000	2017
Belize	Turneffe Atoll Trust	Turneffe Atoll	20,234	$30,000	2018
Colombia	Fundación Biodiversa Colombia	Magdalena Valley	580,000	$70,000	2019
Kenya	Nature Kenya – the East Africa Natural History Society	Dakatcha Woodland	1,214,057	$40,600	2020
Brazil	Instituto Uiraçu	Serra Bonita	2,137,600	$148,373	2020
Kenya	Wildlife Clubs of Kenya	Maasai Mara	80,900	$87,767	2021
Ecuador	Fundación Jocotoco	Chocó Forest	578,335	$50,000	2022
Ecuador	Fundación Jocotoco	Tapichalaca Reserve	538,149	$50,000	2023
Peru	Asociación Neotropical Primate Conservation Peru	Peroles	275,000	$33,384	2024
Colombia	Empulsive Ink	Cabildo Pada Kera	882,800	$100,000	2025
Colombia	SalvaMontes	Reserva Natural Los Magnolios	1,071,000	$100,000	2025
Philippines	Tribes and Natures Defenders	Mount Sagyaan	500,000	$55,000	2025

TiME’s first campaign in 2016 led to the protection of the habitat of the Critically Endangered yellow-tailed woolly monkey (Oreonax flavicauda) in Pampa del Burro, Peru, in the heart of the Tropical Andes Biodiversity Hotspot. TiME raised US$30,000, which was then given as a grant for the purchase of 660,00 m^{2} (163 acres) by the Yambrasbamba Campesino Community in La Esperanza, represented by Mr. Isidoro Lozano. The local NGO Asociación Neotropical Primate Conservation Peru helps the community protect the land.

In 2017, TiME raised funds that enabled the expansion of Sun Angel's Gardens reserve in the Peruvian Amazon. The reserve's biodiversity, including the Near Threatened royal sunangel hummingbird (Heliangelus regalis) and the Endangered white-bellied spider monkey (Ateles belzebuth), was particularly vulnerable to illegal loggers, hunters and squatters because of its horseshoe shape. TiME's grant of US$17,000 was given to the local Indigenous community of La Primavera via the local NGO Asociación Neotropical Primate Conservation Peru to acquire 6,660,000 m^{2} (1,646 acres) inside the U-shape of the reserve, creating contiguous habitat and ensuring the protection of the land.

TiME's fundraising in 2018 resulted in a grant of US$30,000 to Turneffe Atoll Trust to acquire a 20,234 m^{2} (5-acre) plot in Turneffe Atoll, Belize. Part of the Belize Barrier Reef, a global ecological hotspot for marine biodiversity, Turneffe Atoll faces numerous threats because of its close proximity to Belize City, especially unsustainable fishing practices, development and dredging, and the extraction of non-timber products. Some of the threatened species now protected in this habitat are the Critically Endangered hawksbill sea turtle (Eretmochelys imbricata) and the Vulnerable goliath grouper (Epinephelus itajara).

Land in the threatened Tumbes–Chocó–Magdalena biodiversity hotspot in Colombia was protected through TiME's 2019 grant. The 580,000 m^{2} (143-acre) plot costing US$70,000, expanded the El Silencio reserve, which is owned and managed by TiME's local partner, Fundación Biodiversa Colombia. The expanded reserve now preserves more habitat to protect threatened species like the Critically Endangered blue-billed curassow (Crax alberti) and the Critically Endangered brown spider monkey (Ateles hybridus), while increasing the reserve's financial sustainability by making it more attractive to tourists and researchers.

The year 2020 was a milestone for This is My Earth because it raised sufficient funds (nearly US$200,000) to give grants for the purchase of two plots of land in two very different biodiversity hotspots. TiME granted US$40,600 to purchase and protect 1,214,057 m^{2} (300 acres) in Dakatcha Woodland, Kenya, part of the East African Coastal Forests biodiversity hotspot. Now protected is the Endangered Clarke's weaver (Ploceus golandi), which nests only in this particular part of the world, among other threatened species resident in the area. TiME's local partner for this project is Nature Kenya—the East Africa Natural History Society (EANHS), which owns and manages the land. TiME also gave a grant of US$148,373 for the purchase of 2,137,600 m^{2} (528 acres) in the Atlantic Forest in Brazil to its local partner, Instituto Uiraçu, to expand the Serra Bonita Reserve. Among the threatened species now protected in Serra Bonita are the Critically Endangered buff-headed capuchin (Sapajus xanthosternos) and the Critically Endangered banded cotinga (Cotinga maculata), as well as predators that require larger territories, like the puma (Puma concolor) and the Vulnerable harpy eagle (Harpia harpyja).

In 2021, TiME raised funds to protect land in the iconic Maasai Mara ecosystem, which has the highest density of wildlife in Kenya. TiME's grant of US$87,767 to Wildlife Clubs of Kenya purchased 80,900 m^{2} (20 acres) to preserve a critical migratory corridor and habitat for wildlife, including the Critically Endangered black rhinoceros (Diceros bicornis) and the Endangered Masai giraffe (Giraffa camelopardalis spp. tippelskirchi).

This Is My Earth's eighth grant of US$50,000 in 2022 allowed for the purchase of the last large tract of Chocó lowland forest in Ecuador. This land purchase of 578,335 m^{2} (143 acres) expanded the conservation area that TiME’s local partner, Fundación Jocotoco, owns and manages, creating a continuous habitat that rises from 50 m to 5,000 m above sea level and enables animals and plants to migrate to higher elevations as the climate changes. Among the threatened species protected in the Chocó forest are the Critically Endangered great green macaw (Ara ambiguus) and the Endangered brown-headed spider monkey (Ateles fusciceps), among other threatened species.

In 2023, TiME gave a grant of US$50,000 to purchase another conservation site in Ecuador, this time 538,149 m^{2} (133 acres) in the unique upper tropical cloud forest and páramo grasslands. The grant allowed Fundación Jocotoco to expand its Tapichalaca Reserve, protecting many threatened species, including the Endangered jocotoco antpitta (Grallaria ridgelyi) and mountain tapir (Tapirus pinchaque). Preserving this land also enhanced ecological connectivity between two of Ecuador's national parks, Podocarpus and Yacurí.

TiME protected more threatened habitat in the most biologically diverse region in the world, the Tropical Andes biodiversity hotspot, in 2024. A grant of US$33,384 to TiME’s local partner, Asociación Neotropical Primate Conservation Peru, protected 275,000 m^{2} (68 acres) at Peroles, Peru, adjacent to land TiME helped NPC Peru to acquire in 2016. This land purchase expanded the protected habitat of the Critically Endangered yellow-tailed woolly monkey, the Endangered Andean night monkey (Aotus miconax) and other threatened species.

In 2025, TiME was able to fund the purchase all three conservation sites proposed to members in its annual campaign. Spanning the globe, the three now-protected habitats include two in Colombia and one in the Philippines — the first threatened habitat TiME has protected in Asia. For two of the reserves, TiME is partnering with Indigenous communities: the Embera Chami in Cabildo Pada Kera, Colombia (with the help of Empulsive Ink) and the Higa-onon on Mount Sagyaan, Philippines, through their organization Tribes and Natures Defenders. TiME raised US$100,000 for a grant to acquire 882,800 m^{2} (218 acres) in the Northwestern Andean montane forests of Colombia. Here, Cabildo Pada Kera will have a rights-of-nature legal structure — a fundamental departure from human ownership of land — in which the land has legal personhood, hence legal rights, and the previously dispossessed Embera Chami people are the land’s legal guardians. Among the threatened species in Cabildo Pada Kera that are now protected are the Endangered giant otter (Pteronura brasiliensis) and siren glassfrog (Nymphargus siren). TiME’s second land grant in 2025 of US$100,000 expanded by 1,071,000 m^{2} (265 acres) Reserva Natural Los Magnolios in Colombia, owned and managed by its local partner SalvaMontes. The expansion preserves an essential wildlife corridor for threatened and endemic species such as the Critically Endangered Handley’s slender opossum (Marmosops handleyi) and Vulnerable red-bellied grackle (Hypopyrrhus pyrohypogaster). It also protects a recently discovered population of the Critically Endangered orchid Dracula lemurella. Completing the trifecta of 2025 grants, in the Philippines TiME gave US$55,000 to Tribes and Natures Defenders to acquire and manage 500,000 m^{2} (124 acres) of the Higa-onon people’s sacred forest. The land on Mount Sagyaan will protect numerous species including the Critically Endangered Philippine eagle (Pithecophaga jefferyi), the national bird of the Philippines.

== Ecosystem services evaluation ==
Protecting biodiversity hotspots appears to be a very good investment. A recent study by Gavish et al. (2027) based on five conservation sites purchased with TiME grants showed that every dollar donated to TiME for the conservation of the five sites provided an average of $288 in added value (the net value of the land purchase minus the value of an alternative, non-conservation use of the land) through ecosystem services. Due to the many speculative values relating to the evaluation of ecosystem services, this study is particularly useful as a potential tool to compare and prioritize land for conservation based on their ecosystem services.

== Fundraising ==
TiME raises funds in two different ways for two different purposes:

=== Crowdfunding ===
TiME uses crowdfunding to raise funds to make conservation grants. All funds raised through its website go to grants to local organizations to acquire land for conservation; none of these funds are used to support operations. Funds are allocated to candidate sites based on a voting system, in which every donor receives one vote each year to cast for their preferred conservation site, irrespective of the amount they give (US$1 or more).

=== Grants & other funding ===
Grants from foundations and unrestricted donations from individuals are used to cover operating costs, notably TiME’s website, social media, coordination with local partners, and other administrative expenses, as well as to top up funds raised on the website for land-acquisition grants. Operations are also supported by a large number of unpaid volunteers who generously give their time to TiME’s education and grant programs, fundraising, communications and outreach, and administration and governance. Donations restricted to land conservation (but not given through TiME’s website) or for the educational program are also periodically received and allocated accordingly.

== Procedure for land conservation ==
TiME allocates its funds for land-purchase grants democratically based on the relative number of votes by TiME’s donors the candidate conservation sites receive in each year’s fundraising campaign. Once a conservation site reaches the amount requested, it receives the funds to purchase the land.

=== Grant program for land purchases and site selection ===
Privately owned land to be purchased and protected may be proposed to TiME by any nonprofit or nongovernmental organization worldwide via TiME’s Land-Purchase Grant Program on its website. TiME's Scientific Advisory Committee evaluates the merits of proposed sites on the basis of biodiversity, current and future land threats, conservation-management plans and the capacity of the local organization to execute them, approving those best able to protect the most threatened species and habitats in perpetuity. The minimum funds needed to acquire the land are also considered. The top-three approved candidate sites are added to TiME’s annual fundraising campaign, posted on TiME's website, and have one calendar year (January 1 to December 31) to garner as many votes as possible. If a site does not attract enough support and thus funding from TiME to purchase the land, it may continue as a candidate for at least one more year. Votes are reset to zero at the start of the new campaign year, but funds already raised for a site are carried forward.

=== Voting and allocation of donations ===
Each donor receives one vote per year. To become a member for a given calendar year, a donation of at least one US dollar must be made through TiME's website. Once a donation has been made, the donor is given a vote to choose their preferred conservation site.

Each project is allocated funds from donations in proportion to the percentage of votes it receives.

=== Transfer of funds to local organizations and subsequent monitoring ===
Once a site is selected for a land-purchase grant, TiME requests from the local organization that proposed the site a management plan that includes specific goals for protecting and restoring biodiversity and proposes activities to achieve these goals. This plan is reviewed by a team that includes ecologists and conservation experts. Once the plan is approved, TiME and the partner organization sign a legal contract, which includes a commitment by the partner to protect the land for one hundred years. TiME then transfers the funds to the local partner to acquire the land. Each subsequent year, the local partner sends an update to TiME on progress in achieving the goals noted in the management plan and other activities on the site.

== Education ==
This is My Earth has developed an educational program available free to educators for students at primary-, middle-, and high-school and post-secondary learning levels. Curricula are posted on TiME’s website and include level-appropriate activities to teach students about biodiversity and conservation using the candidate sites on the website to engage students in real-life conservation decisions. A free course for educators was offered through the European SchoolNet Academy to learn how to teach TiME’s curricula. As of 2026, TiME’s curricula have been used by close to 4,000 students in nearly 50 institutions across Africa, Europe, the Middle East and North America.

== Governance ==
TiME is led by an international team of scientists, environmental leaders and advocates representing every continent, all working to save biodiversity through the conservation of critical habitats around the world.

=== Board of directors ===
- Dr. Dror Ben-Ami
- Dr. Olga Barbosa
- Mr. Darrell Erb Jr.
- Dr. Deborah Goldberg
- Dr. Clive G. Jones
- Dr. Gladys Kalema-Zikusoka
- Mr. Guy Milhalter
- Mr. Tom Murtha
- Ms. Tauni Sauvage
- Dr. Uri Shanas

=== Scientific advisory committee ===
- Dr. Dianne Brunton
- Dr. Gerardo Ceballos
- Dr. Nick Haddad
- Dr. David Mutekanga
- Dr. Simone Oigman-Pszczol
- Dr. William (Bill) Ripple
- Dr. Uri Shanas
- Dr. Jian Wu
