= Viereck (disambiguation) =

Viereck is a city in Mecklenburg-Vorpommern, Germany.

Viereck may also refer to:

- Viereck's skipper (Atrytonopsis vierecki), a butterfly in the family Hesperiidae

== People with the surname ==
- George Sylvester Viereck (1884–1962), German-American poet, writer and pro-Nazi propagandist
- Henry Lorenz Viereck (1881–1931), American entomologist who specialised in Hymenoptera
- Peter Viereck (1916–2006), American poet

== See also ==
- Verecke, a mountain pass in Ukraine
