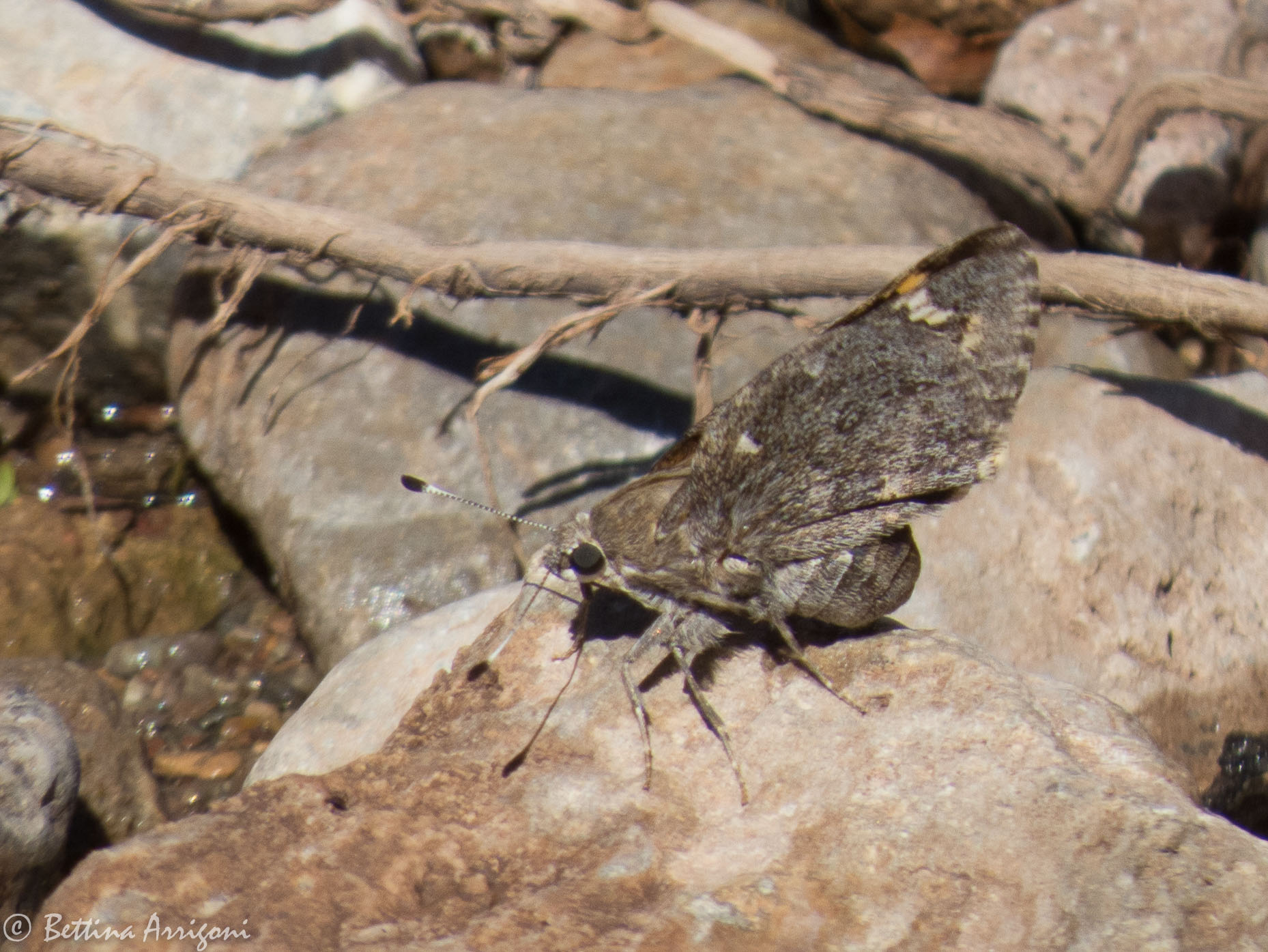

Scientific classification
- Kingdom: Animalia
- Phylum: Arthropoda
- Class: Insecta
- Order: Lepidoptera
- Family: Hesperiidae
- Genus: Atrytonopsis
- Species: A. edwardsi

Binomial name
- Atrytonopsis edwardsi Barnes & McDunnough, 1916

= Atrytonopsis edwardsi =

Species of butterfly

Atrytonopsis edwardsi, the sheep skipper, is a grass skipper butterfly in the family Hesperiidae. The species was first described by William Barnes and James Halliday McDunnough in 1916. It is found in Central and North America.

The MONA or Hodges number for Atrytonopsis edwardsi is 4088.
