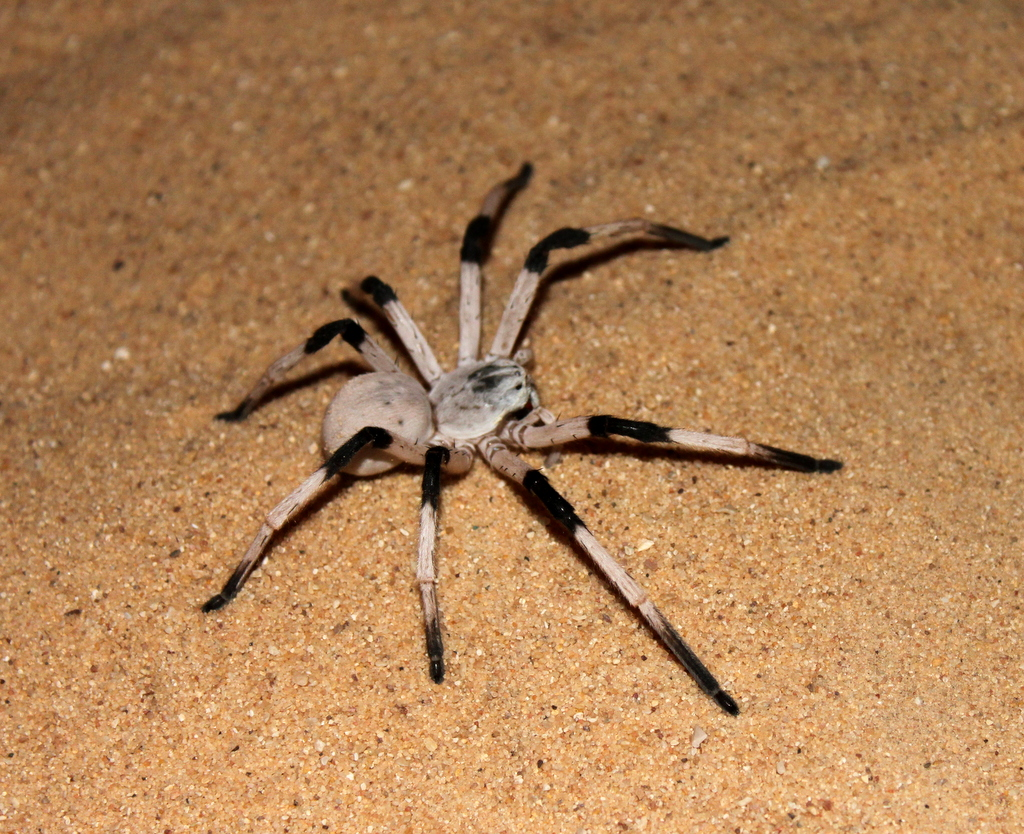
- Cerbalus aravaensis in the Sands of Samar

Scientific classification
- Kingdom: Animalia
- Phylum: Arthropoda
- Subphylum: Chelicerata
- Class: Arachnida
- Order: Araneae
- Infraorder: Araneomorphae
- Family: Sparassidae
- Genus: Cerbalus; Simon, 1897

Type species
- C. pulcherrimus (Simon, 1880)

Species
- 8, see text

Synonyms
- Marmarica Caporiacco, 1928

= Cerbalus =

Genus of spiders

Cerbalus is a genus of huntsman spiders that was first described by Eugène Louis Simon in 1897. It is considered a senior synonym of Marmarica.

== Species ==
As of September 2019 it contains eight species, found in Africa, the Levant, and on the Canary Islands:

- Cerbalus alegranzaensis Wunderlich, 1992 – Canary Is.
- Cerbalus aravaensis Levy, 2007 – Israel, Jordan
- Cerbalus ergensis Jäger, 2000 – Tunisia
- Cerbalus negebensis Levy, 1989 – Israel
- Cerbalus pellitus Kritscher, 1960 – Egypt
- Cerbalus psammodes Levy, 1989 – Egypt, Israel
- Cerbalus pulcherrimus (Simon, 1880) (type) – North Africa
- Cerbalus verneaui (Simon, 1889) – Canary Is.
