= Deborah Goldberg =

American ecologist and Margaret B

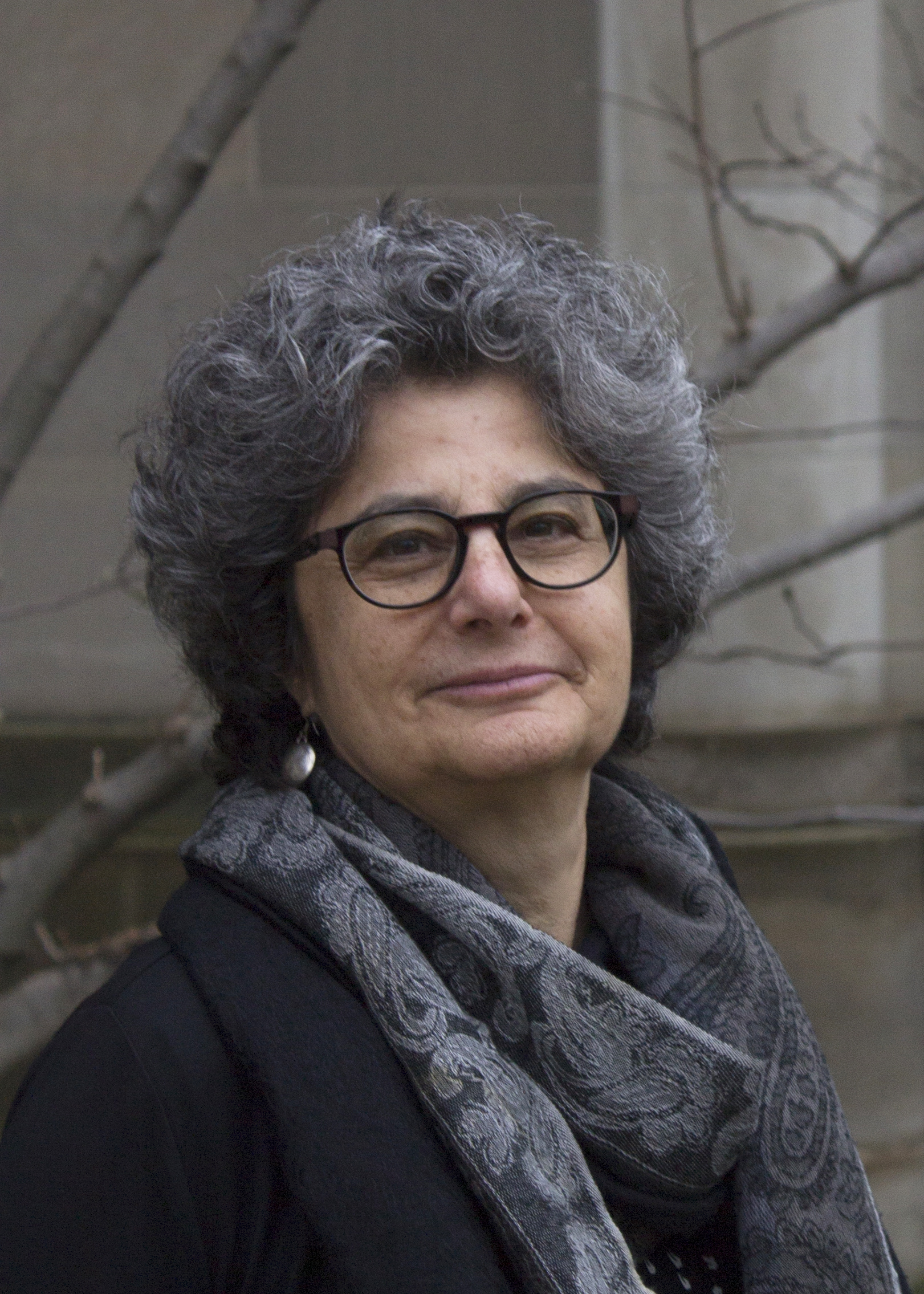
- Citizenship: United States
- Education: Ph.D., 1980, University of Arizona; B.A., 1975, Barnard College
- Scientific career
- Fields: Community ecology, plant ecology
- Institutions: University of Michigan, Ben Gurion University, Hebrew University, University of New Mexico
- Thesis: The Distribution of Evergreen and Deciduous Trees Relative to Soil Type: An Example from the Sierra Madre, Mexico, and a General Model
- Academic advisors: Paul S. Martin; Charles Herbert Lowe
- Notable students: Katharine N. Suding

Deborah Esther Goldberg is an American ecologist and Margaret B. Davis Distinguished University Professor Emerita and Arthur F. Thurnau Professor Emerita in the Department of Ecology and Evolutionary Biology at the University of Michigan.

== Life ==
Prior to becoming the Margaret B. Davis Distinguished University Professor, she was the Elzada U. Clover Collegiate Professor. In April 2015, the Journal of Ecology published a virtual issue of the journal in her honor, reprinting 10 papers that she had previously contributed to the journal.

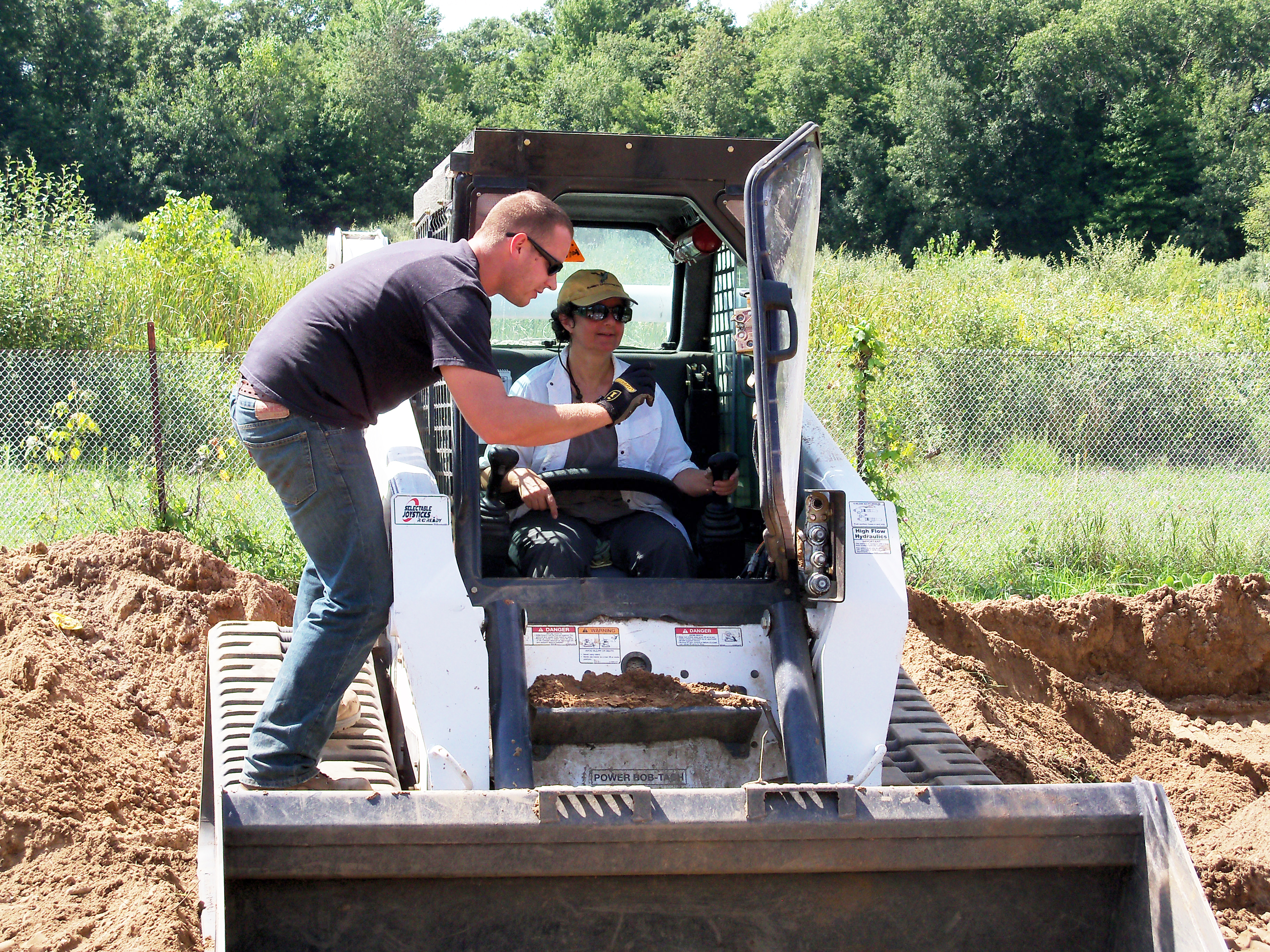
Deborah Goldberg conducting fieldwork

She is known for her study of competitive interactions in plant communities. Goldberg is a member of the board of This is My Earth, a non-profit organization dedicated to preserving biodiversity.

== Awards ==
- 2014, Fellow of the Ecological Society of America
- 2014, Fellow of the American Association for the Advancement of Science
- 2015, Journal of Ecology Eminent Ecologist Virtual Issue In Honor of Deborah Goldberg
- 2018 Margaret B. Davis Distinguished University Professor of Ecology and Evolutionary Biology
