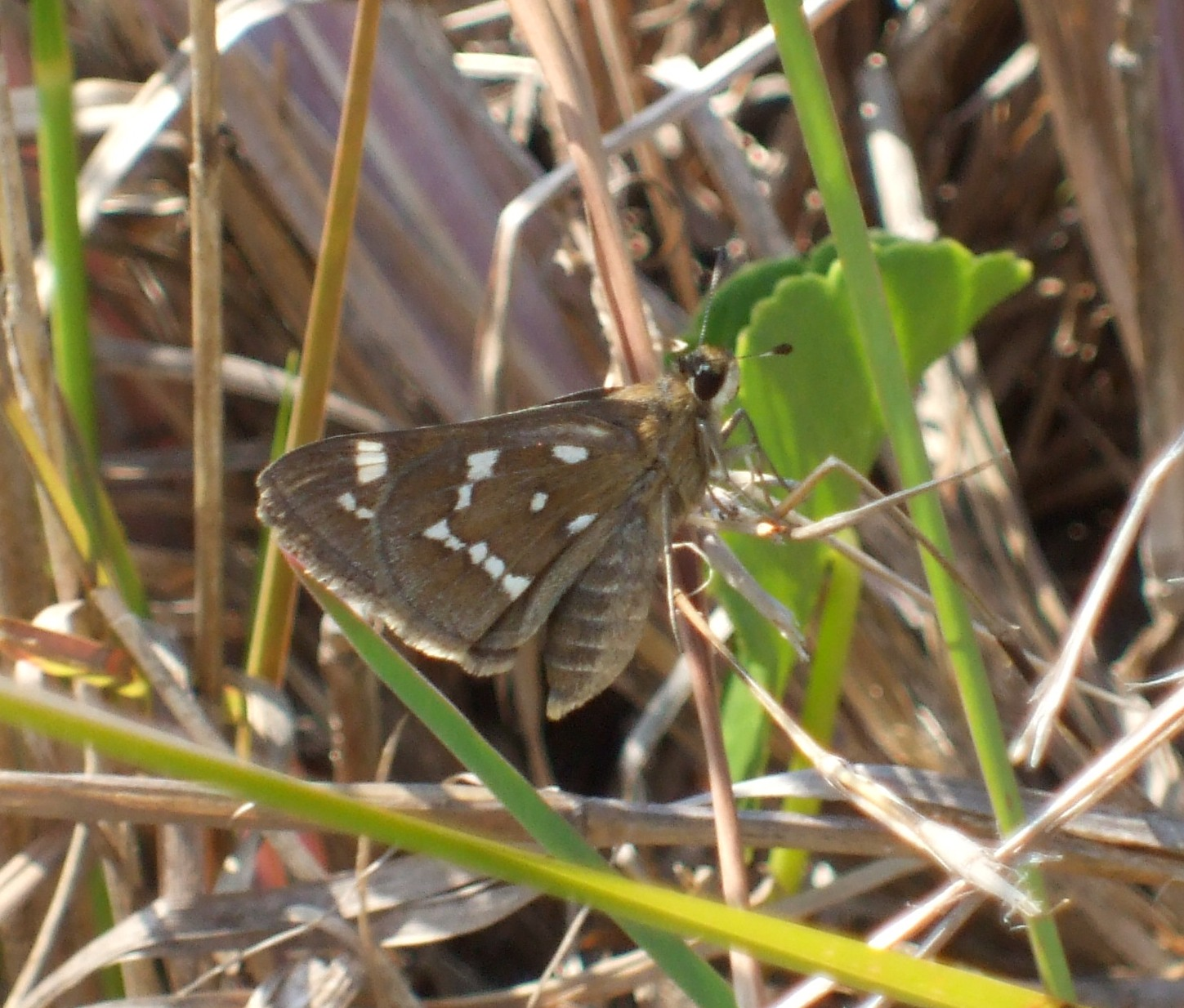
- Atrytonopsis quinteri

Scientific classification
- Kingdom: Animalia
- Phylum: Arthropoda
- Class: Insecta
- Order: Lepidoptera
- Family: Hesperiidae
- Subfamily: Hesperiinae
- Tribe: Hesperiini
- Genus: Atrytonopsis; Godman in Godman & Salvin, [1900]

Species
- 13, see text

= Atrytonopsis =

Genus of butterflies

Atrytonopsis is a genus of butterflies in the skipper family, Hesperiidae. They are native to Mexico and the southwestern United States.

Species include:

- Atrytonopsis austinorum Warren, 2011
- Atrytonopsis cestus (Edwards, 1884) – cestus skipper
- Atrytonopsis deva (Edwards, 1876) – Deva skipper
- Atrytonopsis edwardsi Barnes & McDunnough, 1916
- Atrytonopsis frappenda (Dyar, 1920)
- Atrytonopsis hianna (Scudder, 1868) – dusted skipper
- Atrytonopsis loammi (Whitney, 1876)
- Atrytonopsis lunus (Edwards, 1884) – moon-marked skipper
- Atrytonopsis ovinia (Hewitson, [1866])
- Atrytonopsis pittacus (Edwards, 1882) – white-barred skipper
- Atrytonopsis python (Edwards, 1882) – python skipper
- Atrytonopsis quinteri Burns, 2015
- Atrytonopsis vierecki (Skinner, 1902) – Viereck's skipper
- Atrytonopsis zweifeli Freeman, 1969
