= Sands of Samar =

Coordinates: 29.80°N 35.04°E

The Sands of Samar

The Sands of Samar (Hebrew: חולות סמר), also called the Samar sands or Samar sand dunes, are an expanse of sand dunes in the Arava region of southern Israel. Once encompassing an area of seven square kilometers, agricultural development and sand mining have reduced the sands to 2.3 square kilometers. In recent years environmentalists and local residents have campaigned to preserve what remains of the dunes.

== Location, ecology, history ==
The Sands of Samar are located near Kibbutz Samar in southern Israel, 30 kilometers north of Eilat. Once part of a larger network of dunes, zoning for date groves and other crops, as well as factory pollution and extensive sand mining to support construction projects in Eilat, have vastly reduced the presence of sand dunes in the area. Since Israel's 1994 peace treaty with Jordan, which placed neighboring dunes on the Jordanian side of the border, the Sands of Samar are the last remaining sand dunes on Israel's side of the Arava, constituting a unique and valuable habitat for desert-dwelling organisms. Of the seven square kilometers of dunes that once existed, 2.3 square kilometers remain today.

== Formation ==
The Samar sand dunes were formed over thousands of years as grains of crumbled Nubian sandstone from the Timna Valley were carried south and east toward the salt pan of Yotvata. Over time, eolian processes shaped the sands into stable dune formations.

== Flora and fauna ==
=== Flora ===
- Haloxylon persicum

=== Fauna ===
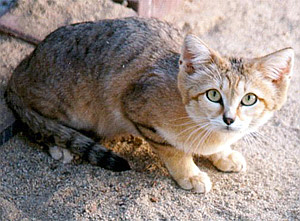
Felis margarita – "sand dune cat"; it's an endangered species.

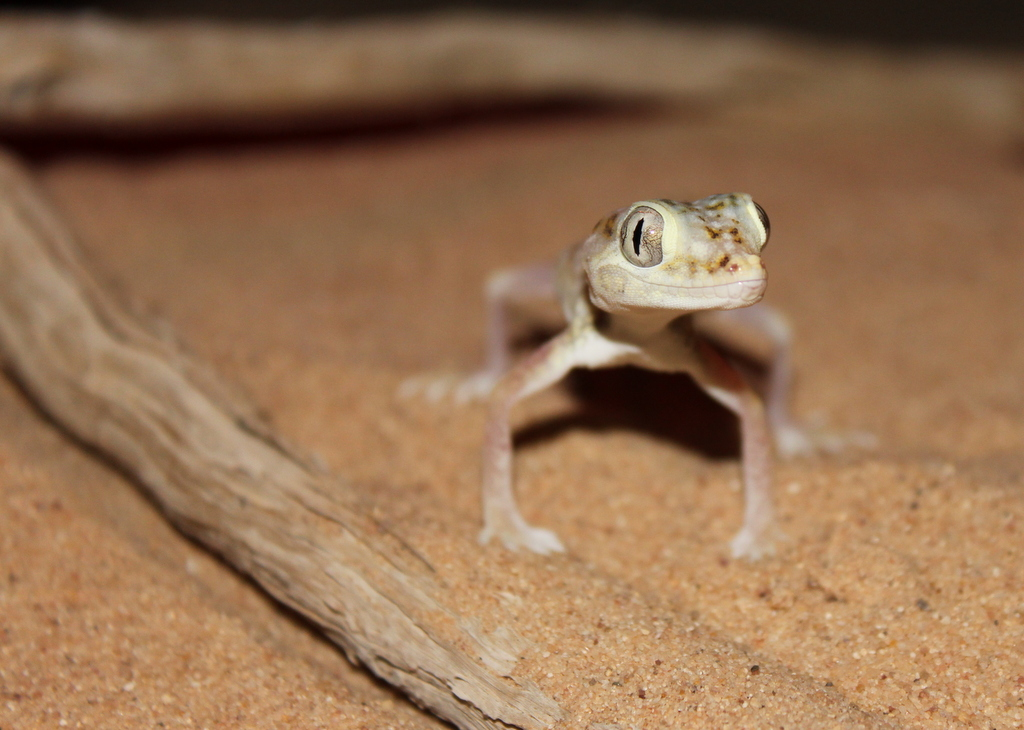
Stenodactylus doriae

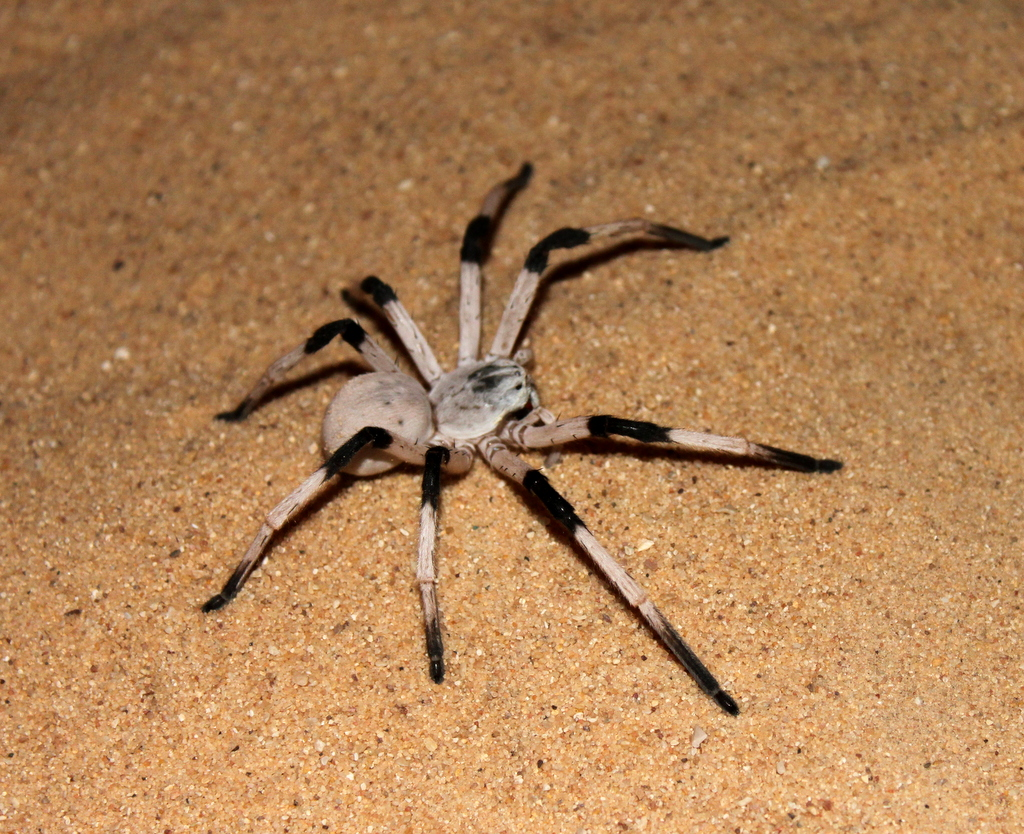
Cerbalus aravaensis

- Cerbalus aravaensis, spider
- Gerbillus gerbillus, rodent
- Stenodactylus doriae, gecko
- Cerastes gasperettii, viper
- Felis margarita (locally extinct), sand cat
- Vulpes rueppelli (locally extinct), fox

Israeli researchers at the University of Haifa, in collaboration with Jordanian academics, discovered evidence indicating that the organisms inhabiting the Sands of Samar have a unique genetic composition. In 2010, researchers identified a never-before-classified species of spider living in the Samar sands – the largest of its kind in the Middle East. Other animals, such as the sand cat, that once roamed the dunes have become extirpated. According to local residents, predators like wolves, foxes and jackals, which thrive on the easy access to food provided by increased agricultural development, have supplanted more delicate organisms uniquely adapted to extreme environments.

== Conservation efforts ==
In November 2008 the Israel Union for Environmental Defense petitioned a court in Beer Sheva to block a new plan submitted by the Israel Land Administration to resume sand mining at Samar. The Union argued that there were feasible alternatives to mining the Sands of Samar and that anyway the available sands would not last for more than five to seven years. After the court determined that there was no legal basis for the Union's claim, an appeal was made to the Supreme Court. In January 2011 the Supreme Court dismissed the appeal, leaving the sands' fate in the hands of the Southern District's planning and building council. IUED proposed offering alternative sand mining sites, but the contractor who won the Land Administration's request for tender turned down the suggestion.

In May 2011, the New York-based Green Zionist Alliance and the Israel-based Green Movement launched a joint campaign to preserve Samar through a public petition combined with an effort to raise enough money to buy back the development rights to the dunes and preserve the area as a national park. The campaign aims to raise one million shekels (NIS), of which more than 130,000 shekels had been pledged as of September 2011.

In October 2011, environmental organizations and local residents petitioned the Land Administration's newly appointed chairman, imploring him to suspend plans to allow bulldozers onto the dunes.

In January 2012, bulldozers razed one third of the dunes and environmental organizations working to save Samar — led by the Green Zionist Alliance, the Green Movement, the Society for the Protection of Nature in Israel and the Israel Union for Environmental Defense — successfully saved the remaining two thirds of the Samar sand dunes, which will be preserved by the state as a wilderness and recreation area.

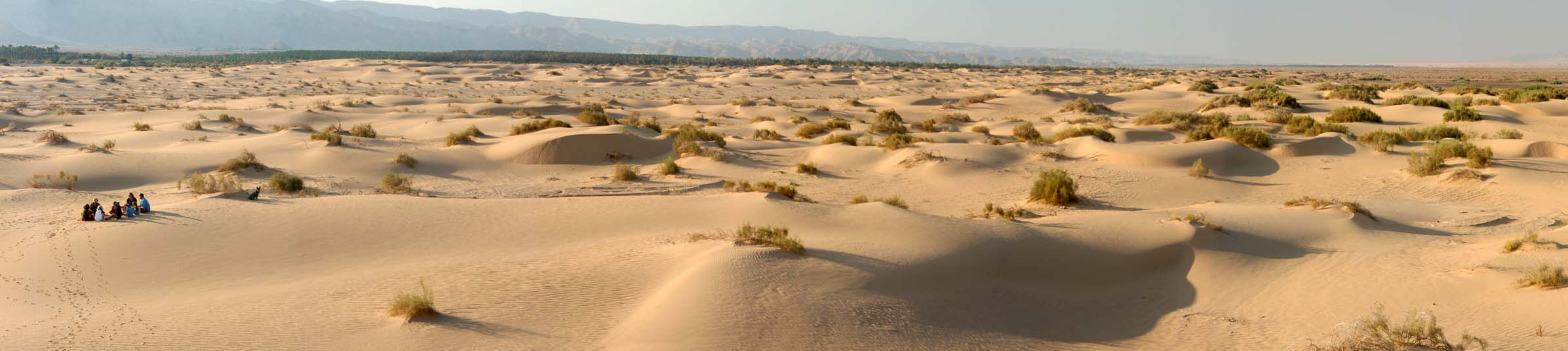
Panorama of the Samar sands

== See also ==
- Israel–Jordan peace treaty
