= Samar, Israel =

Samar: סמר (Hebrew); سامار (Arabic)
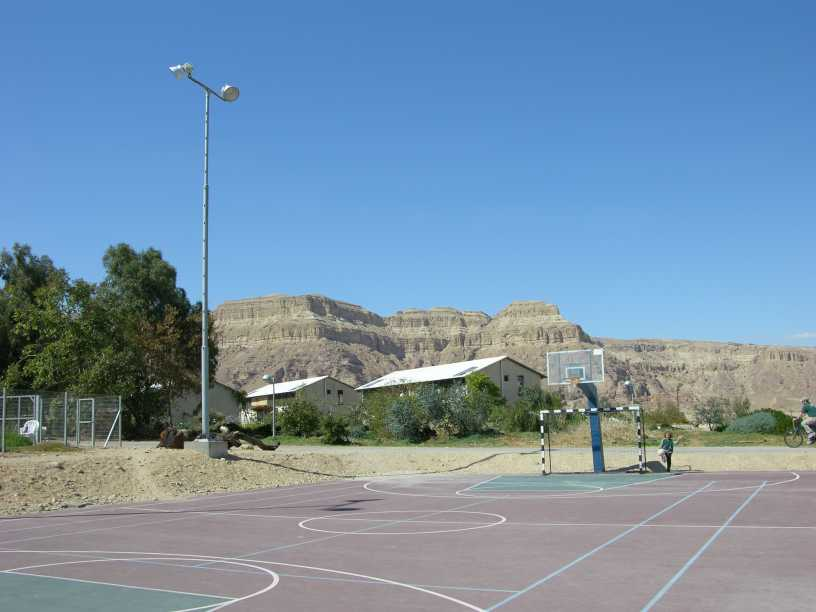
- Sports field

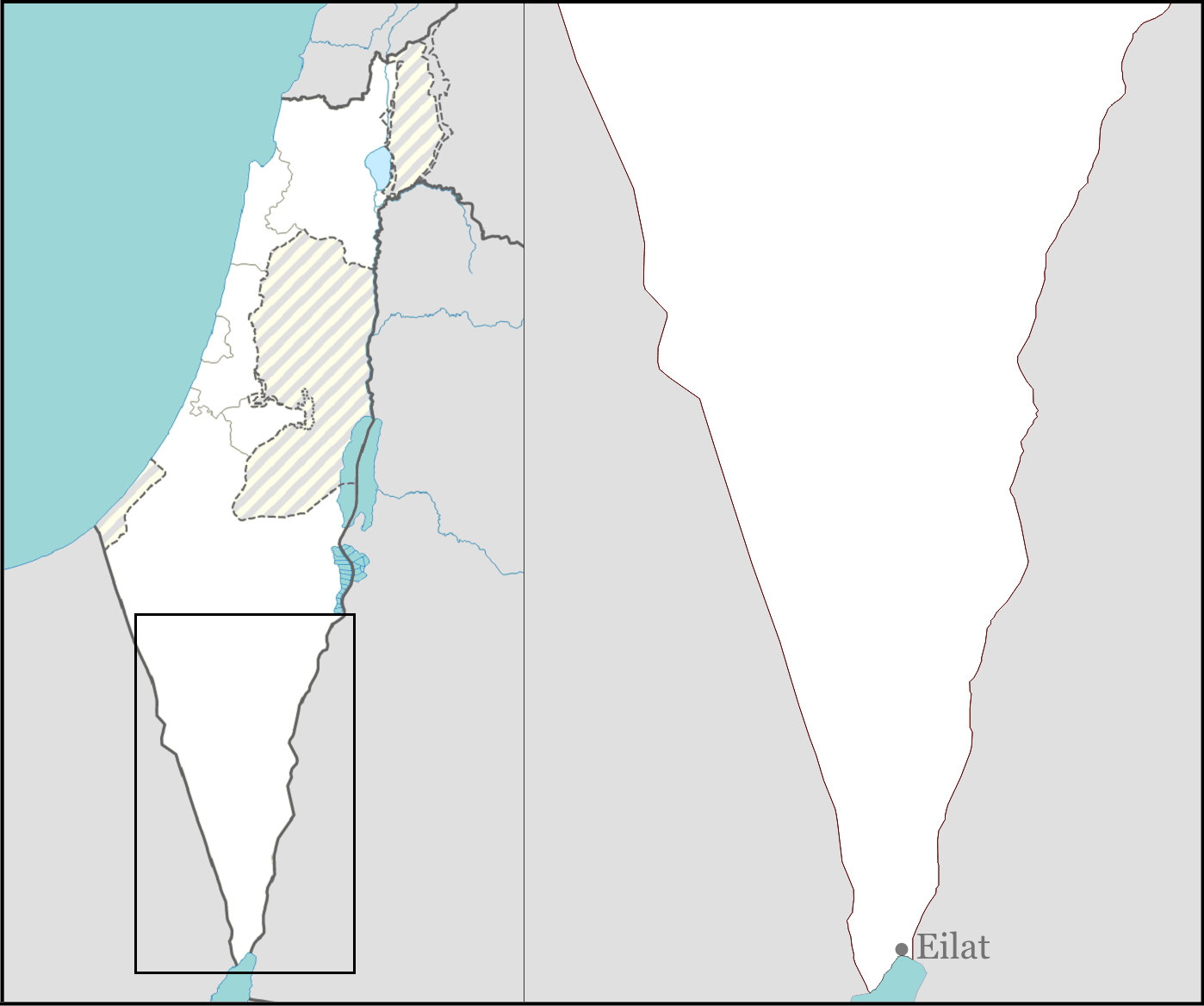
- Location within Southern Negev region of Israel
- Coordinates: 29°50′0″N 35°1′19″E
- Country: Israel
- District: Southern
- Subdistrict: Beersheba
- Council: Hevel Eilot
- Affiliation: Kibbutz Movement
- Founded: 1976
- Founder: Hashomer Hatzair members
- Population (2024): 254

Samar (Hebrew: סָמָר) is a kibbutz in the Aravah Valley in the far south of Israel. Located near and north of Eilat, it falls under the jurisdiction of Hevel Eilot Regional Council. In 2024 it had a population of 254.

== History ==
The kibbutz was founded in 1976 by gar'in from other kibbutzim who wanted to form a different kind of community. The name "Samar" is borrowed from a plant that grows in the Aravah and near the Dead Sea, the Hebrew name of the plant Juncus, a type of wild rush.

Samar is one of the few kibbutzim that continues to maintain a lifestyle consistent with the original socialist ideals of the kibbutz movement.

== Economy ==
Kibbutz Samar is primarily engaged in growing and exporting organic dates. Dates from Kibbutz Samar and other kibbutzim in the Ardom Co-op can be purchased in the United States at Mrs. Green's Natural Market. Locally grown varieties include medjool, nour, zahidi and barhi. There are also around 350 milk cows on the kibbutz, and a similar number of calves.

== Infrastructure ==
Most of Samar's electricity is set to be provided by a 30 m solar power tower that provided 100 kilowatts of electricity, as well as the kibbutz's heating needs. The tower was built by the company AORA, sits on 2 dunams (0.2 hectares), and includes 30 mirrors.

== See also ==
- Sands of Samar
