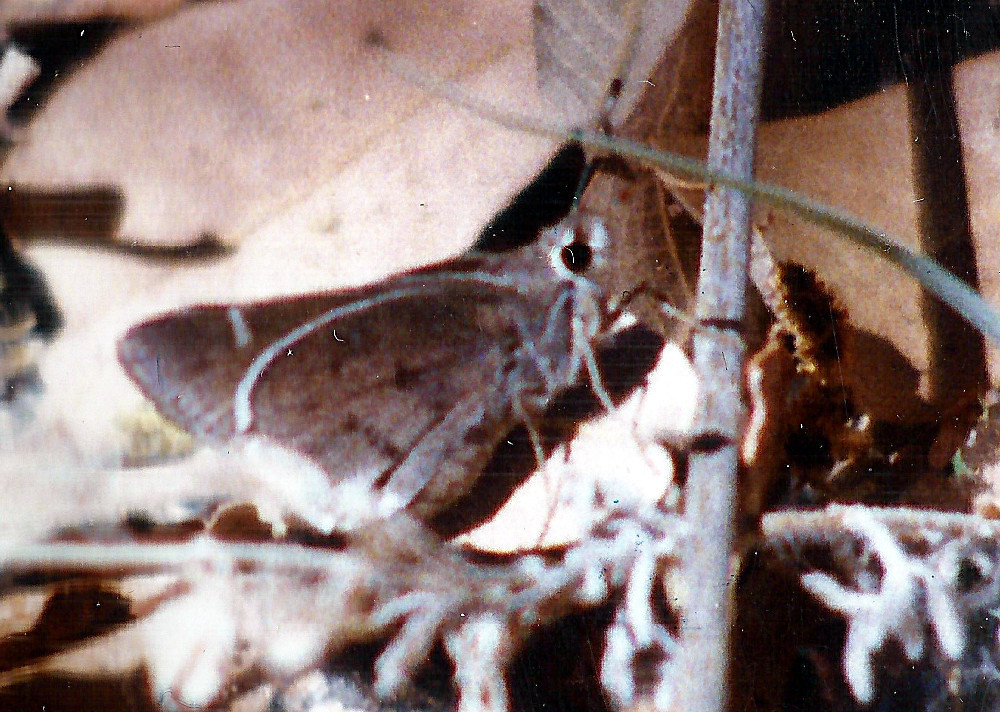

Scientific classification
- Kingdom: Animalia
- Phylum: Arthropoda
- Clade: Pancrustacea
- Class: Insecta
- Order: Lepidoptera
- Family: Hesperiidae
- Genus: Atrytonopsis
- Species: A. deva

Binomial name
- Atrytonopsis deva (W. H. Edwards, 1877)

= Atrytonopsis deva =

Species of butterfly

Atrytonopsis deva, the deva skipper, is a species of grass skipper in the butterfly family Hesperiidae. It is found in Central America and North America.
