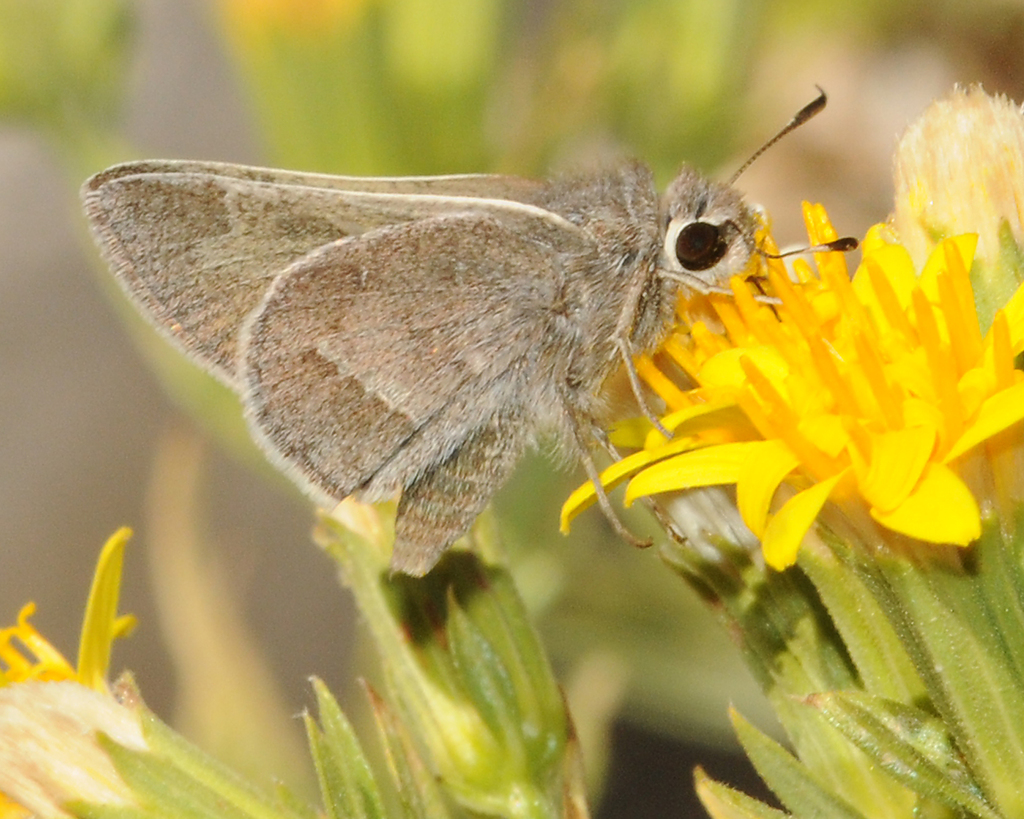

Conservation status
- Vulnerable (NatureServe)

Scientific classification
- Kingdom: Animalia
- Phylum: Arthropoda
- Class: Insecta
- Order: Lepidoptera
- Family: Hesperiidae
- Genus: Atrytonopsis
- Species: A. pittacus

Binomial name
- Atrytonopsis pittacus (W. H. Edwards, 1882)

= Atrytonopsis pittacus =

Species of butterfly

Atrytonopsis pittacus, the white-barred skipper, is a species of grass skipper in the family Hesperiidae. It was described by William Henry Edwards in 1882 and is found in Central and North America.

The MONA or Hodges number for Atrytonopsis pittacus is 4085.
