= Nick M. Haddad =

American ecologist

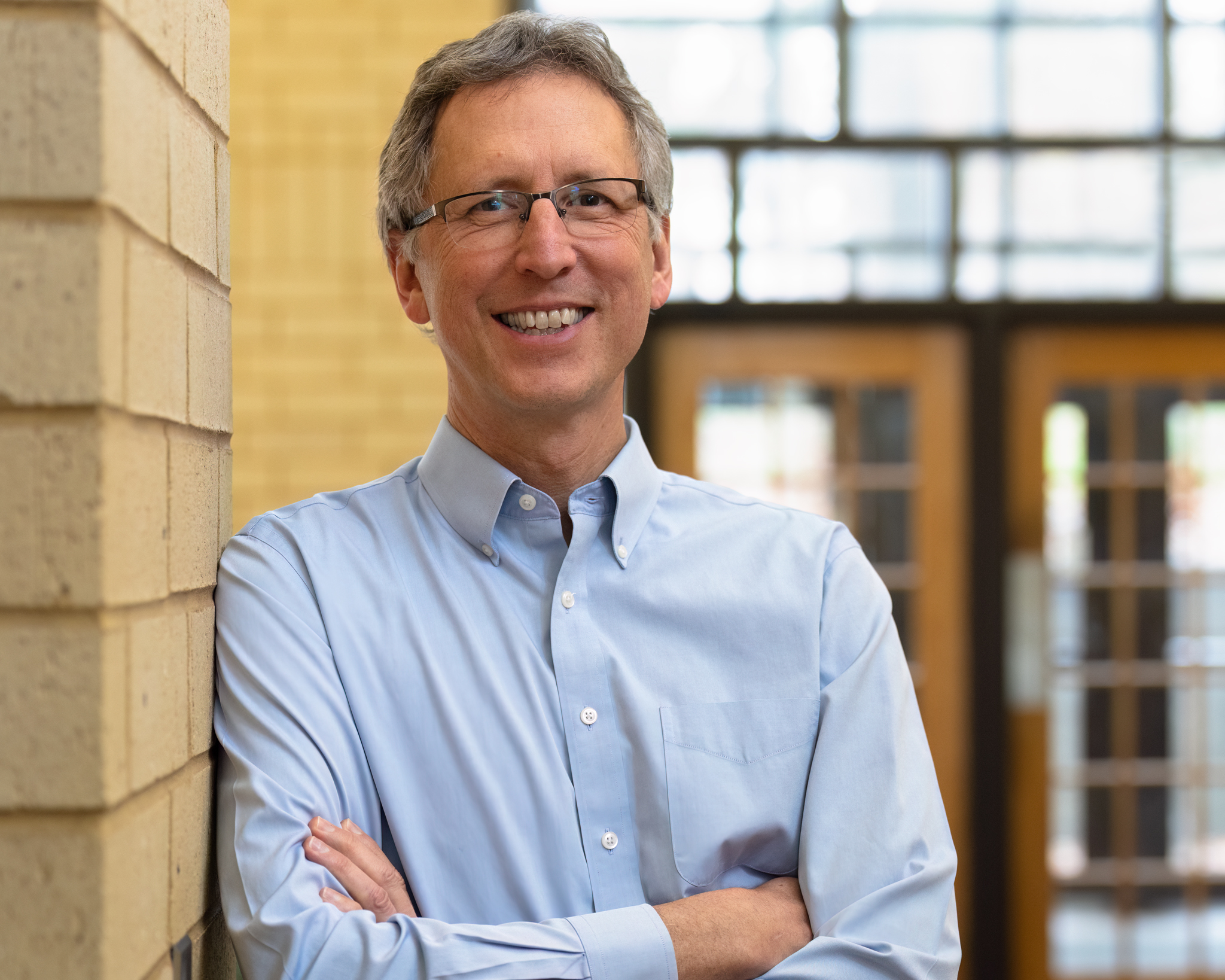
- Education: Stanford University; University of Georgia
- Scientific career
- Workplaces: Michigan State University; North Carolina State University
- Thesis: Do corridors influence butterfly dispersal and density? A landscape experiment (1997)
- Doctoral advisor: Ron Pulliam
- Other academic advisors: David Tilman; Paul Ehrlich
- Website: nickhaddadlab.com conservationcorridor.org

Nick M. Haddad is an ecologist and conservation biologist at Michigan State University. He is a professor in the Department of Integrative Biology and a member of the Ecology, Evolution, and Behavior Program. Haddad is also the co-director of the Long Term Ecological Research (LTER) site at the Kellogg Biological Station (KBS).

== Education and career ==
Haddad earned a Bachelor of Science degree in biology in 1991 from Stanford University, where he conducted ecological research on birds with Tom Sisk, Gretchen Daily, and Paul Ehrlich. He obtained a Ph.D. in Ecology from the University of Georgia in 1997, working under the guidance of Ron Pulliam. He did postdoctoral research with David Tilman at the University of Minnesota from 1997 to 1999, where he studied the effects of plant diversity on the diversity and abundance of insects.

Haddad joined the faculty at North Carolina State University in 1999 as the William Neal Reynolds Distinguished Professor in Applied Ecology and also served as the University Director of the Southeast Climate Adaptation Science Center. Since 2017, Haddad has been a professor at Michigan State University and the co-director of the KBS LTER project. The KBS LTER project was established in 1988 to study how ecological processes and sustainable agricultural practices can be used to manage row-crop agriculture for both yield and the environment.

Haddad has served on the boards of directors of several local and regional conservation organizations, including the Sandhills Ecological Institute.

== Research ==
=== Landscape conservation ===
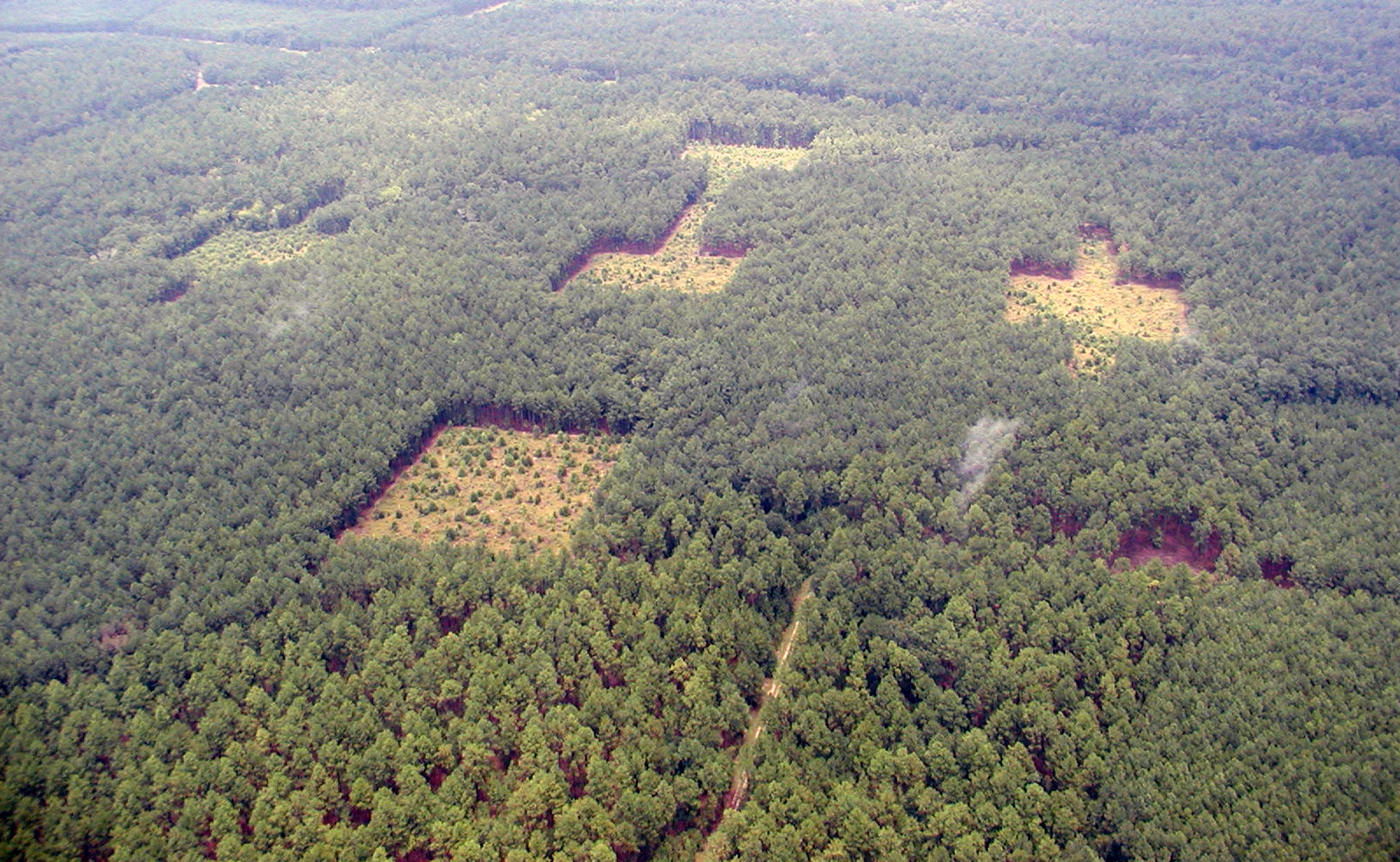
Plots from the long-term corridor experiment at Savannah River Site in South Carolina.

In 1994, Haddad established a large-scale, long-term experiment in collaboration with the US Forest Service at the Savannah River Site in South Carolina to test the ecological effects of landscape corridors. With data from the experiment, Haddad and his collaborators have shown that corridors increase the dispersal of butterflies and other insects, plants, small mammals, and other organisms, and that, relative to isolated fragments, corridors increase plant diversity. Sharon Collinge, now at the University of Arizona, said: "This is really the first to demonstrate this so clearly"—that corridors work—"for an experiment at this spatial scale and this temporal scale." The experiment is still ongoing.

Haddad has worked with others who lead long-term experiments to show that habitat fragmentation reduces biodiversity, and that extinctions continue over decades. Writing in The New Yorker, Michelle Nijhuis writes: "no matter the ecosystem—forest, prairie, patch of moss—the effects of habitat fragmentation are ruinous." In the same study, Haddad and collaborators showed that the world's forests today are highly fragmented, with 20% within 100 meters of the forest edge. Edge effects penetrate far into forests and have negative effects on biodiversity. As observed by David Edwards, "These patches thus fail to maintain viable populations, which over time are doomed—an 'extinction debt' yet to be paid."

In 2013, Haddad created a web portal, Conservation Corridor, to act as an online resource for information, news, and visual content about the science and management of corridors and connectivity in the land- and seascape.

=== Butterfly conservation ===
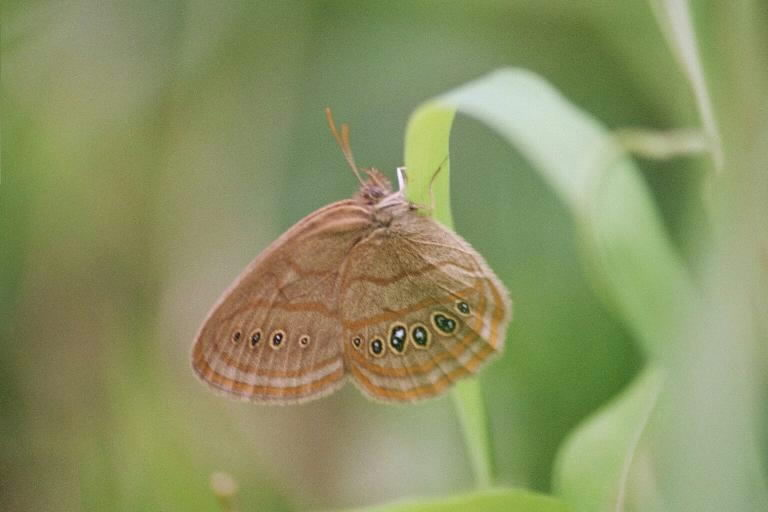
St. Francis' satyr (Neonympha mitchellii francisci) butterfly.

In his 2019 book, "The Last Butterflies: a Scientists Quest to Save a Rare and Vanishing Creature," Haddad recounts his and other studies of six of the world's rarest butterflies, including the St. Francis' satyr, the crystal skipper, the Miami blue, and Bartram's scrub hairstreak butterflies. He describes the threats to their survival and the science that informs the potential for their recovery, noting that butterfly conservation efforts begin too late, when a species is already on the precipice of extinction. Stanford biologist Paul Ehrlich writes: "Haddad's riveting stories reveal the reason for such fates, including discoveries that will direct the future of butterfly and insect conservation for decades to come."

Haddad's research has also shown how disturbances can be key to maintaining populations of rare butterflies. On Radiolab, he described the irony of how fires set on an army artillery range are critical to the maintenance of a rare species, St. Francis' satyr, that occurs only there. In collaboration with the John Ball Zoo, Haddad's lab maintains captive populations of Poweshiek skipperling and Mitchell's satyr butterflies, to provide individuals for release into new restoration sites.

Haddad has also studied broader trajectories of insect decline, including of common species. In studies of records accumulated by practicing and community scientists over 21 years across the state of Ohio, his lab found that butterfly abundances declined by about 2% per year, or 33% in total over the course of the study. He has also collaborated with other butterfly ecologists to show that since 2000 the total number of butterflies across the continental U.S. has decreased by 22%.

== Awards and honors ==
Haddad was named a Fellow of the Ecological Society of America in 2017 for his "pioneering experimental tests of habitat fragmentation and conservation corridors." He has been an Aldo Leopold Foundation Leadership Fellow since 2008. In 2025 he was selected as a Fellow of the American Association for the Advancement of Science.
