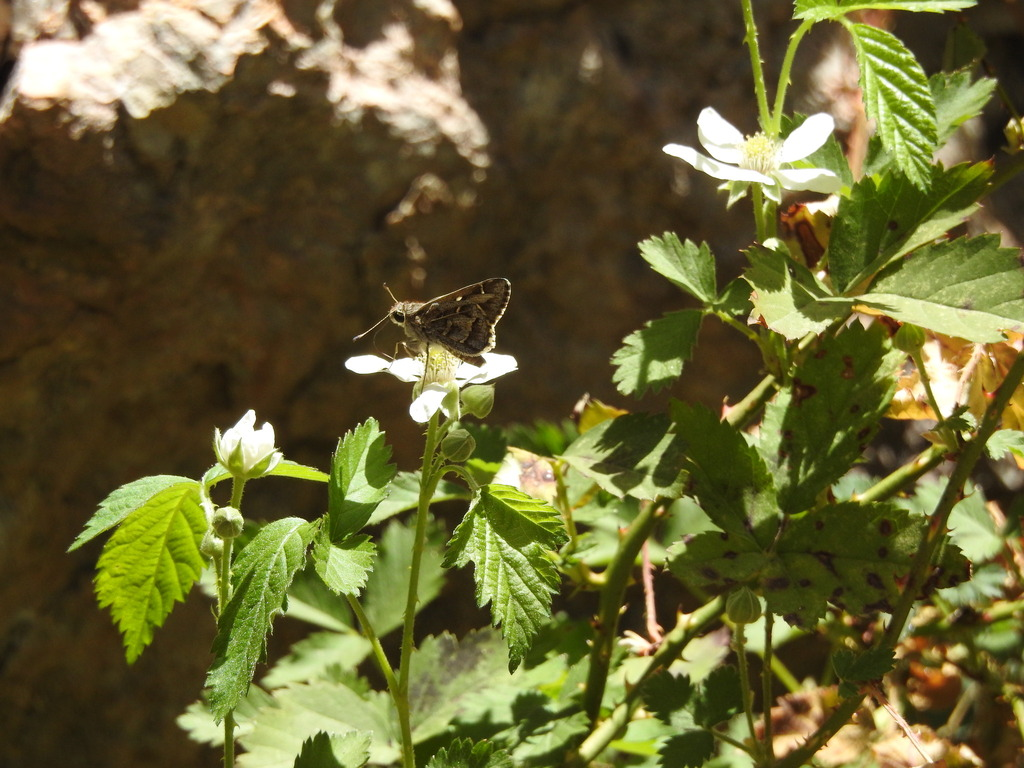

Conservation status
- Imperiled (NatureServe)

Scientific classification
- Kingdom: Animalia
- Phylum: Arthropoda
- Class: Insecta
- Order: Lepidoptera
- Family: Hesperiidae
- Genus: Atrytonopsis
- Species: A. cestus

Binomial name
- Atrytonopsis cestus (W. H. Edwards, 1884)

= Atrytonopsis cestus =

Species of butterfly

Atrytonopsis cestus, the cestus skipper, is a species of grass skipper in the butterfly family Hesperiidae.

The MONA or Hodges number for Atrytonopsis cestus is 4087.
