= Alon Tal =

Israeli politician, activist, and academic

Alon Tal (Hebrew: אלון טל; born 12 July 1960) is an Israeli politician, academic and environmentalist. He was a member of the 24th Knesset between 2021 and 2022, representing the Blue and White political party; founder of the Israel Union for Environmental Defense and the Arava Institute for Environmental Studies; and co-founder of Ecopeace: Friends of the Earth–Middle East, This Is My Earth, Zafuf, the Israel Forum for Demography, Environment and Society, Aytzim: Ecological Judaism, and the Green Movement. Tal was appointed chair of the Department of Public Policy at Tel Aviv University in 2017 and in 2026 was a co-founder of the university's Center for Population Science.

== Early life ==
Tal was born on July 12, 1960, and grew up in Raleigh, North Carolina, as Albert Rosenthal. He was active in the Young Judaea youth movement, served on its national executive board, and participated in its Israel program in 1977. After graduating from the University of North Carolina at Chapel Hill in 1980, he moved to Israel and enlisted in the Israeli army. He changed his name to Alon Tal after making aliyah to Israel and becoming an Israeli citizen. He served in the Nahal paratrooper division and saw action in the 1982 First Lebanon War. After his discharge, Tal attended Hebrew University Law School in Jerusalem. During his time at law school, Tal played saxophone and fiddle in the popular Jerusalem-based rock band, Liquid Plummer. In 1983 he began work as a legal intern in Israel's Environmental Protection Service (part of the Ministry of Interior) and subsequently clerked in the office of Israel's Attorney General, Yitzhak Zamir. In 1986, Tal returned to the U.S. and enrolled in the Harvard School of Public Health, where he studied Environmental Science and Public Policy. His doctoral dissertation, which was funded by the U.S. Environmental Protection Agency, analyzed state strategies to control agricultural nonpoint source pollution.

== Environmental career ==
Tal returned to Israel in 1989 and settled at Kibbutz Ketura with his wife Robyn. In 1990, he founded Adam Teva V'din, the Israel Union for Environmental Defense, one of Israel's leading advocacy groups. In this capacity, he initiated successful legal action to address a range of environmental hazards (for example, illegal sewage discharges and air and water pollution), repeatedly sued the government for inadequate implementation of environmental law, and provided free legal representation to numerous local environmental organizations. In 1995, the organization filed a highly publicized—but ultimately unsuccessful—petition to the Supreme Court to prevent the building of Highway 6.

In 1996, Tal founded the Arava Institute for Environmental Studies at Kibbutz Ketura, an advanced academic program that brings together Israelis, Palestinians, Jordanians and international students. In 1999, he was elected chairman of Life and Environment, the umbrella organization for Israel's environmental groups, which grew from 24 to 80 member groups during his five-year tenure.

In 2001, Tal co-founded the Green Zionist Alliance: The Grassroots Campaign for a Sustainable Israel, a New York–based nonprofit that would later become Aytzim: Ecological Judaism. Since then, Tal has served as one of the Green Zionist Alliance's Israeli representatives.

Between 2004 and 2015 Tal served on the international board of the Jewish National Fund (JNF), Israel's forestry and land reclamation agency, as an elected representative of the Green Zionist Alliance, in partnership with the Conservative Movement. He was appointed chair of the JNF's subcommittee for sustainability, which in 2005 drafted new policies for the organization's forestry, reservoirs and stream restoration program. In 2006, Tal was appointed chair of the Land Development Committee, which oversees the JNF's forestry and land restoration work. Advocating a new sustainable agenda for the organization, he promoted, expanded funding for sustainable afforestation, bike trails and research. In 2014 he launched an initiative to prioritize JNF financial support for environmental projects in Israel's Arab communities.

In 2007, Tal and Mohammad Said Al-Hmaida, former director of the Palestinian Ministry of Environment, prepared a “shadow treaty” for a final settlement between Israel and the Palestinians, which offered an ambitious vision of cooperation and coordinated management. Tal also helped bring together 15 Israeli and 15 Palestinian water experts to consider specific areas of agreement and disagreements in regional water management, which was published in the 2010 book Water Wisdom.

Tal won the Charles Bronfman Prize for young humanitarian leadership in 2006, and used the prize money to establish the Tal Fund, which supports grassroots Israeli environmental activism. Tal received Israel's Environment Ministry's lifetime achievement award as a 48-year-old, in honor of Israel's 60th anniversary in 2008.

In 2015, he joined Professor Uri Shanas as one of the founders of the "This Is My Earth - TIME" initiative an international effort to purchase biodiversity "hot spots" as conservation sanctuaries through crowd sourcing.

Tal has remained active in a range of environmental advocacy initiatives, including preparation of proposed biodiversity protection legislation and involvement in public interest litigation. He was a plaintiff in the successful, 2014 class action suit following the massive oil spill in Israel's Ein Evrona nature reserve, that sought to cover the damage caused by negligence on the part of the Eilat Ashkelon Pipeline Company. In March 2018, along with colleagues in academia and attorney Tzvi Levinson, Tal filed another class action against polluting chemical factories located on the Rotem plain, based on the massive contamination of the underlying groundwater and the resulting polluting of the pristine Boqeq stream in the Dead Sea region. At the time, it was the highest damages ever sought in an Israeli environmental civil action.

== Academic appointments ==
Tal taught at the Tel Aviv University Law School from 1990 until 2004. In 2005 he joined the faculty of the Desert Research Institutes at Ben Gurion University. His research has focused on water policy, monitoring transboundary stream water quality, assessing the Israeli government's environmental enforcement program, evaluating national environmental education programs, forestry policy, surveying Israel's environmental movement and assessing a range of environmental history and policy issues. He has been a visiting professor or affiliated with numerous universities including the Harvard School of Public Health (1989-1997); University of Otago Law School (1998, 2003, 2008, 2016); Stanford University Center for Conservation Biology (2011, 2013–14); Michigan State University (2015-2025) and Renmin University of China (2015). In 2017, Tal returned to Tel Aviv University to assume the position of Chair of the Department of Public Policy. After leaving the Knesset, in 2023 he accepted an appointment as a visiting professor at the Stanford University Business school where he continues to teach climate policy and is an Israel Fellow at the Freeman Spogli Institute for International Studies (2024, 2025).

In 2006, in conjunction with the United Nations Convention to Combat Desertification, he initiated a bi-annual international Conference on Drylands, Deserts and Desertification at Ben Gurion University, which brings together some 500 participants from over 60 countries to discuss a range of research findings and issues associated with sustainable land management in drylands. He chaired five consecutive conferences, most recently in 2014. In May 2025 he chaired a major conference at Stanford University on Climate Resilience and Local Municipal Policies: Lessons from Los Angeles and Tel Aviv.

== Political career ==
=== Green movement ===
In 2008, Tal was among the founders of the Green Movement, which ran in the 2009 Knesset elections on a joint ticket with Meimad. Tal was the third candidate on the slate. The party received 1% of the popular vote, falling short of the required 2% electoral threshold.

In 2010, Tal was elected chair of the party and began promoting a broad social and environmental agenda. Shortly thereafter, the Green Movement took legal action to prevent the appointment of Yoav Gallant as chief of staff of the Israel Defense Forces, due to his seizure of public land next to his home and the filing of a false affidavit to the Supreme Court. The Attorney General eventually accepted the Green Movement's position and Gallant's appointment was cancelled. During Tal's tenure, the party also initiated campaigns to save the Samar sand dunes, to prevent the privatization of national parks, to stop the development of highway overpasses in the Jerusalem Forest and to create a “Green New Deal” for Israel's economy. Tal also successfully sponsored an initiative to ensure gender equality in the party, ensuring parallel female and male party co-chairs.

In 2010 the Green Movement joined with the Hatnuah party for the 2013 elections. Tal was placed 13th on the party list and oversaw the party's environmental platform. Six months after the elections, he stepped down as party chairman to complete his sabbatical at Stanford University, where he wrote his book: "The Land is Full: Addressing Overpopulation in Israel."

In 2019, Tal joined Benny Gantz's new "Kahol Lavan Hosen LeYisrael" (Israel Resilience) party and was placed 25th on the Knesset list; following the merger with Yesh Atid he was ultimately placed 45th on the slate. During the election campaign he was involved in drafting the party's green platform and active in the party's outreach to Israel's environmental community.

Alon Tal is a regular contributor to the Israel Journal of Foreign Affairs and a former board member of the Israel Council on Foreign Relations. His articles have focused on global climate change and Israeli politics.

=== Member of the Knesset ===
In June 2021 Tal entered the Knesset when members from the 36th Government temporarily resigned their seats to serve as ministers in the new government. During his first year as a parliamentarian, Tal was appointed as chair of the Knesset Subcommittee on Environmental and Climate Impacts on Health as well as Co-Chair of the Public Complaints committee. Among the many bills he submitted are the State of Nature Report Law, a new Forestry and Tree Protection Law and Amendments to Israel's Coastal Environment Protection Law, Cleanliness and Class Action Suit Law. Tal was recognized by Shakuf, an Israeli organization that promotes good government as one of the five most diligent members of the twenty-fourth Knesset and Israel's leading parliamentarian in bi-partisan initiatives.

=== Advocacy for sustainable population growth in Israel ===
Tal was one of Israel's first advocates favoring a national policy to reduce population growth as a precondition to a sustainable future. In 2011, a national convention of the Green Party supported a position that in general recognized the importance of the population issue, but chose not to prioritize it immediately.

Tal called attention to population growth as early as 2002, in Pollution in the Promised Land, his survey of environmental history in Israel:

“The most critical single factor in understanding the downside of Israel’s environmental history is population pressure: with an average increase of one million people a decade, the land soon became very crowded. Israel’s population density is now roughly 270 people per square kilometer. Eventually economics, water resources, noise and the general dysfunction caused by the unbearable density will push Israel into a confrontation with advocates of large families and mass immigration. Environmentalists should not be afraid to speak on behalf of the many natural treasures that will otherwise be decimated by the crowds; flora and fauna are the first to pay for human encroachment on shrinking habitat. Future generations will certainly have reason to resent the deafening silence.”

In an article in the Israel Journal of Foreign Affairs, Tal points out that: Overpopulation is another serious obstacle that Israel faces in dealing with climate change. By enacting more campaigns surrounding family size, Israel could begin to tackle climate change on a larger scale. Tal concludes with the statement: "As a democratic country with an intelligent, patriotic citizenry that cares about the planet, Israel may yet rise to met its global climate change commitments".

In 2015, along with Professor Eyal Rotenberg from the Weizmann Institute, Tal founded the non-profit organization "Zafuf" - the Israel Forum for Demography, Environment and Society. The advocacy group, for the first time, brings a diverse group of Israel academics, activists and concerned citizens together to consider the implications of Israel's population dynamics and raise awareness among the general public about how to begin the process of demographic stabilization. He has since written widely in the Israeli and the international press about the perils of overpopulation in Israel and the world. In 2026, along with his colleague, professor Isaac Sasson, he founded the Center for Population Science at Tel Aviv University where he oversees a range of research initiatives about fertility, migration and sustainable population policy.

=== 2022 Knesset elections ===
Tal was listed in the 24th slot on the National Unity party list. He was not re-elected as the party won 12 seats and left office on 15 November 2022.

== Books ==
- Making Climate Tech Work, Policies that Drive Innovation, Washington, Island Press, 2024
- Environment, Climate Change and National Security, A New Front for Israel, Tel Aviv, INSS Press, 2021,(eds. with Kobi Michaeli, Galia Lindenstrauss, Shira Bukchin, Dov Henin and Victor Weiss).
- From Food Scarcity to Surplus - Innovations in Indian, Chinese and Israeli Agriculture, (with Gulati, Ashok, Huang, Jikun) Springer Press, 2021.
- The Land Is Full: Addressing Overpopulation in Israel, New Haven, Yale University Press, 2016. Hebrew Edition, "V'Haaretz Melayah", B'nei Brak, Hotzaat HaKibbutz HaMeuchad, 2017.
- All the Trees of the Forest: Israel’s Woodlands from the Antiquity to the Present, New Haven, Yale University Press, 2013. Hebrew Edition - "Kol Atzei HaYa'ar", B'nei Brak, Hotzaat HaKibbutz HaMeuchad, 2014.
- From Ruin to Restoration, Israel’s Environmental History, (eds., with Daniel Orenstein and Char Miller) Pittsburgh, University of Pittsburgh Press, 2012
- Water Wisdom: Preparing the Groundwork for Cooperative and sustainable Water Management in the Middle East, (eds., with Alfred Abed Rabbo). New Brunswick, NJ: Rutgers University Press, 2010. ISBN 9780813547718
- Building Green: Policy Mechanisms for Promoting Energy Efficiency in Buildings in Israel, (with Yael Bar-Ilan and David Pearlmutter) The Technion, Center for Urban and Regional Studies Press, 2010.
- The Environment in Israel: Natural Resources, Crises, Campaigns and Policy from the Advent of Zionism until Twenty-first Century, (in Hebrew) B'nei Brak, HaKibbutz HaMeuhad Press, 2006.
- Speaking of Earth: Environmental Visions and Speeches, New Brunswick, NJ, Rutgers University Press, 2006.
- Pollution in a Promised Land – An Environmental History of Israel, Berkeley, California, University of California Press, 2002.
- Environmental and Policy, (eds., with Amir Adleman). Jerusalem Institute for Israel Studies, Jerusalem, 2002.
