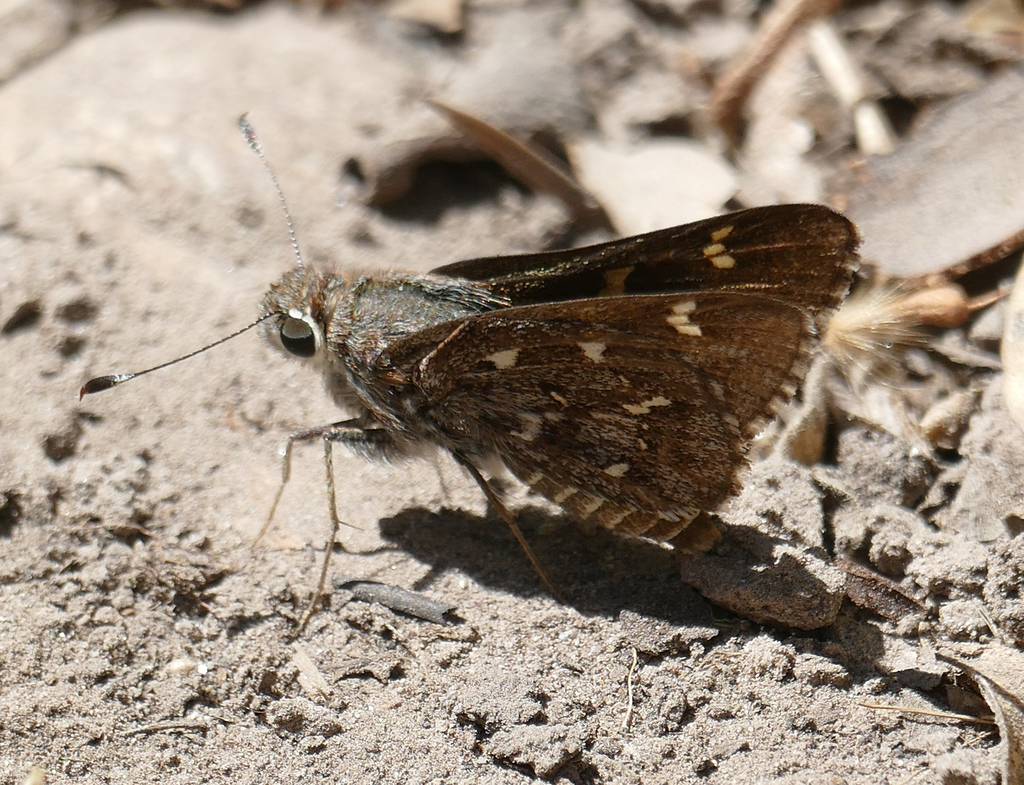

Conservation status
- Apparently Secure (NatureServe)

Scientific classification
- Kingdom: Animalia
- Phylum: Arthropoda
- Clade: Pancrustacea
- Class: Insecta
- Order: Lepidoptera
- Family: Hesperiidae
- Genus: Atrytonopsis
- Species: A. python

Binomial name
- Atrytonopsis python (W. H. Edwards, 1882)

Synonyms
- Pamphila margarita Skinner, 1913

= Atrytonopsis python =

Species of butterfly

Atrytonopsis python, commonly known as python skipper or annual sea-blite, is a species of grass skipper in the butterfly family Hesperiidae. It is found in North America.

== Subspecies ==
Two subspecies are recognised:

- Atrytonopsis python margarita Skinner, 1913
- Atrytonopsis python python W. H. Edwards, 1882
