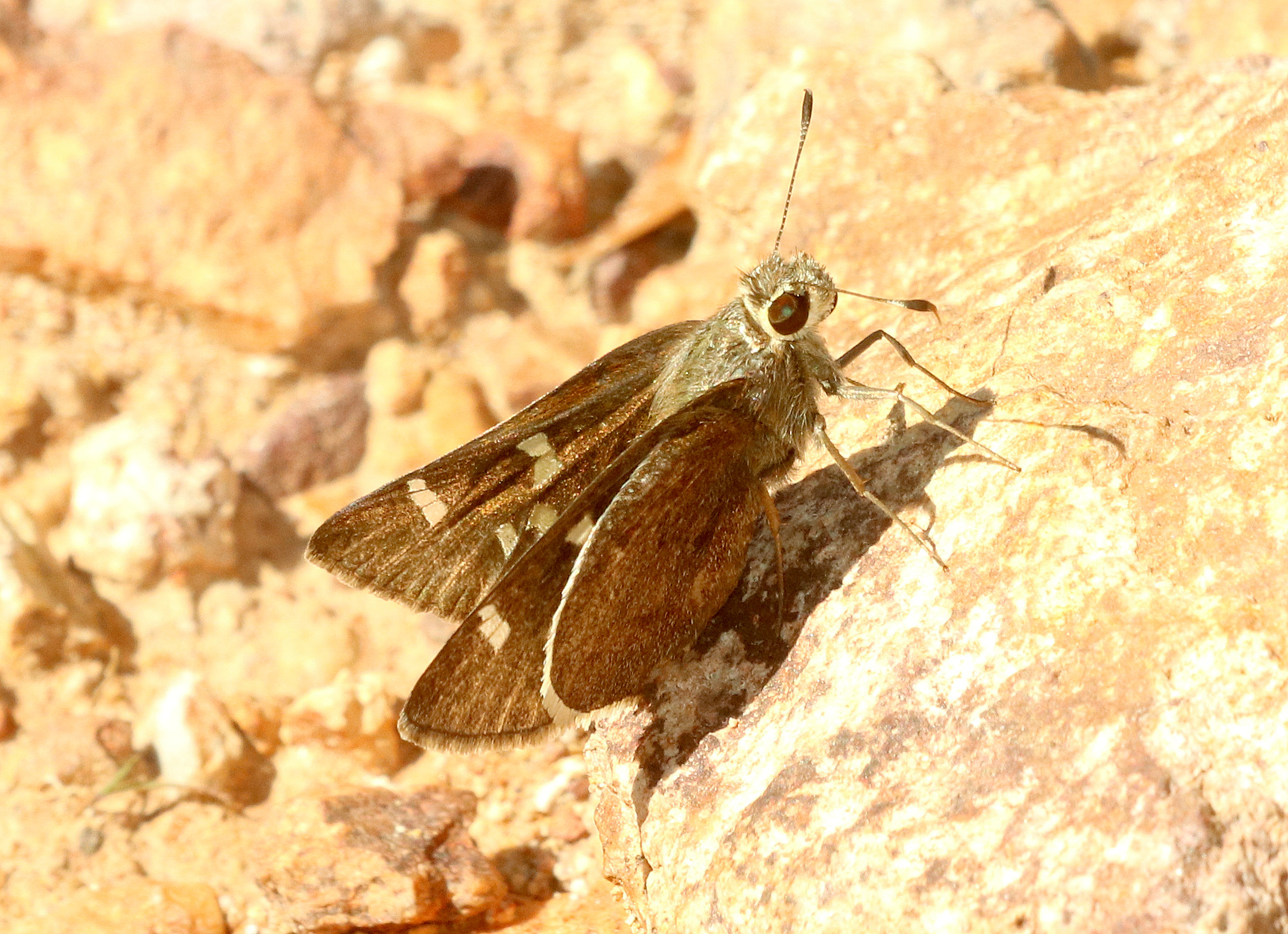

Conservation status
- Vulnerable (NatureServe)

Scientific classification
- Kingdom: Animalia
- Phylum: Arthropoda
- Class: Insecta
- Order: Lepidoptera
- Family: Hesperiidae
- Genus: Atrytonopsis
- Species: A. lunus

Binomial name
- Atrytonopsis lunus (W. H. Edwards, 1884)

= Atrytonopsis lunus =

Species of butterfly

Atrytonopsis lunus, the moon-marked skipper, is a species of grass skipper in the butterfly family Hesperiidae. It is found in Central America and North America.

The MONA or Hodges number for Atrytonopsis lunus is 4082.
