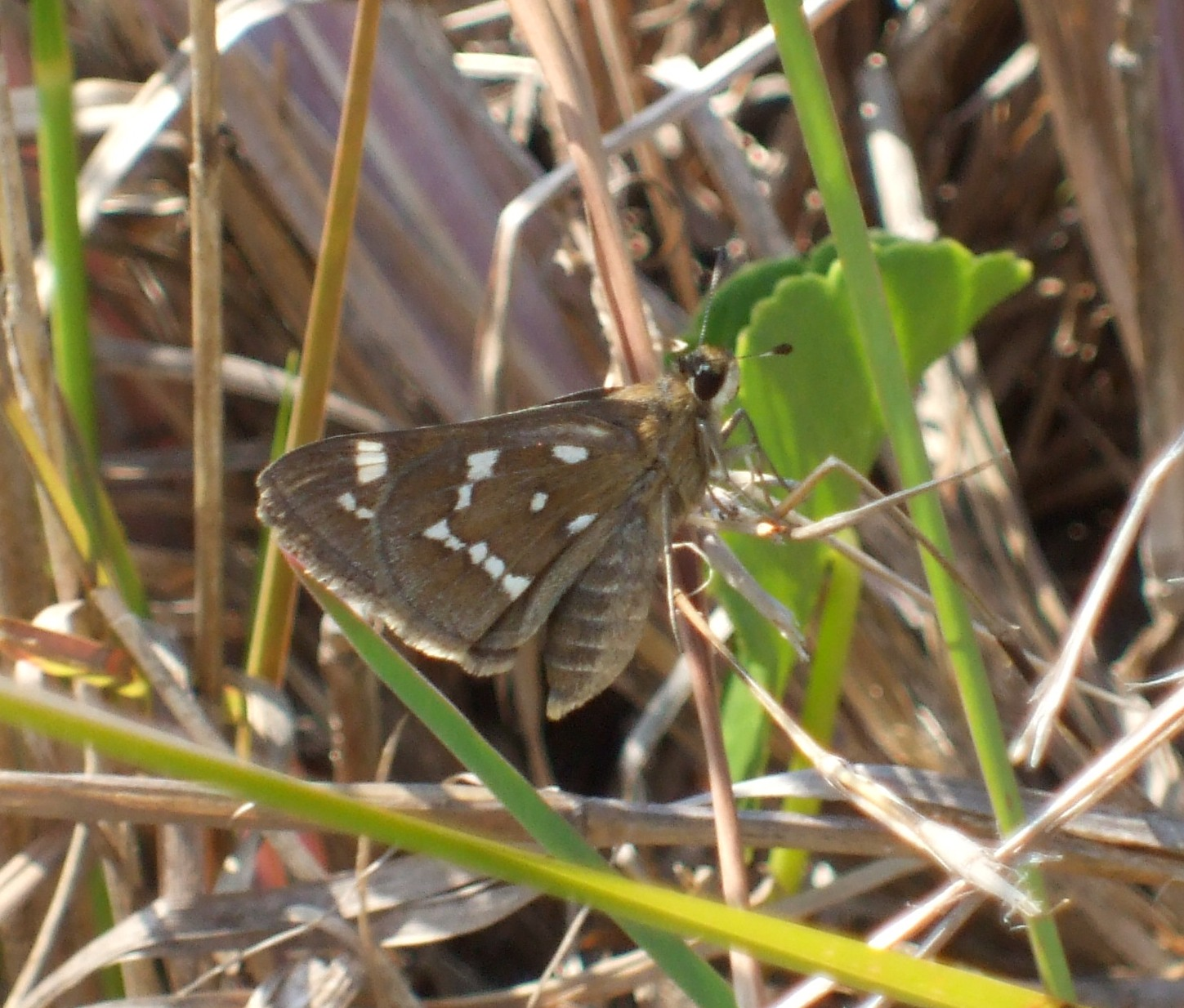

Conservation status
- Critically Imperiled (NatureServe)

Scientific classification
- Kingdom: Animalia
- Phylum: Arthropoda
- Clade: Pancrustacea
- Class: Insecta
- Order: Lepidoptera
- Family: Hesperiidae
- Genus: Atrytonopsis
- Species: A. quinteri

Binomial name
- Atrytonopsis quinteri Burns, 2015

= Crystal skipper =

Species of butterfly

The Crystal skipper (Atrytonopsis quinteri) is a species of butterfly in the family Hesperiidae that is found only along a 30-mile (50 km) stretch of barrier islands in North Carolina's Crystal Coast between Bear Island and the Rachel Carson Reserve. The skipper was first discovered in 1978 by Eric L. Quinter (where the species epithet quinteri comes from) and the paper describing it as a full species was published in 2015.

== Distribution ==
The Crystal skipper is endemic to Bogue Banks, Bear Island, and the Rachel Carson Reserve in North Carolina, USA. Bogue Banks is approximately 25 miles long, Bear Island 3.5 miles long, and the Rachel Carson Reserve 3 miles long. The skipper can also be found on several human-made dredge spoil islands within the vicinity of these natural barrier islands.

Bear Island, part of Hammocks Beach State Park, is completely undeveloped and has the largest skipper population. The second largest population is at Fort Macon State Park, on the eastern end of Bogue Banks. The remaining populations are smaller.

== Taxonomy and common name ==
Burns described Atrytonopsis quinteri as a full species, and details differences in anatomy with related species A. hianna, A. vierecki, A. lunus, A. pittacus, A. python, A. margarita, and A. cestus. The species was believed to be either 1) a full species in the genus Atrytonopsis, 2) a subspecies of A. hianna (the dusted skipper), 3) a subspecies of A. loammi (which some consider to be a subspecies of A. hianna), or 4) the same species as A. loammi. Field guides and checklists often group Atrytonopsis new species 1 with A. loammi. How A. quinteri differs from the very similar A. loammi of coastal Florida is unclear, as Burns does not discuss differences with that species.

A formal common name has not been given for this species, but the most frequently used one is the Crystal skipper. It is called the Crystal skipper because it is native to the section of the North Carolina called the Crystal Coast and because it has white spots on its wings that look like crystals.

== Life cycle ==
The Crystal skipper butterfly is bivoltine, meaning that they have two generations per year. The adult butterflies emerge from their chrysalises in early April to mid-May (the first flight period) and again from early July to the end of August (the second flight period). When the adult butterflies emerge in the first flight period, they mate and the females lay eggs. The eggs then go through four stages of development over 9 days before hatching into a caterpillar. The newly hatched caterpillar builds a shelter out of a seaside little bluestem leaf using silk that they produce in glands near their mouth. This shelter is typically found on living leaves of seaside little bluestem and the caterpillar eats the leaf around their shelter. Over the course of 2-3 months, the caterpillar then goes through six stages of development, called instars. As they grow, they make new shelters made with multiple leaves until they are close to pupation. At that point, the caterpillar moves close to the base of the seaside little bluestem plant and builds a new shelter in the blades of grass right above the ground that looks similar to a tunnel. When they are ready to pupate, they cover the entryway of their shelter with more silk and go through the pupation process until they emerge as a butterfly in the second flight period. These second flight adults also mate and the females lay eggs and caterpillars that go through the same stages of development on seaside little bluestem plants. However, the caterpillar stage is extended significantly over the winter months, as they do not pupate until about a month before the first flight period. Therefore, they are caterpillars for roughly 7-8 months during the fall to springtime.

The Crystal skipper lays its eggs on seaside little bluestem, Schizachyrium littorale, and the caterpillars feed on and live within this grass. Therefore, seaside little bluestem is considered the Crystal skipper’s sole host plant. Seaside little bluestem is a common and abundant plant throughout most of the dunes of the Crystal skipper’s range.

== Habitat ==
The Crystal skipper is found along primary and secondary sand dunes where its host plant, seaside little bluestem (Schizachyrium littorale), is present. Although the largest and most dense populations of the skipper are usually on undisturbed sand dunes, the skipper can also persist in small patches of sand dune habitat, such as undeveloped lots in urban areas. Additionally, the Crystal skipper is found on several human-made dredge spoil islands that have been colonized by seaside little bluestem.

== Conservation status ==
The Crystal skipper is globally rare but locally abundant. Much of the sand dunes on Bogue Banks have been destroyed by development, leaving little habitat for the Crystal skipper outside the two state parks.

The Crystal skipper is a federal species of concern. A “species of concern” is an informal designation by the U.S. Fish and Wildlife Service and is not a term that is defined under the U.S. Endangered Species Act. The Crystal skipper is not federally listed as threatened or endangered. Insects cannot be listed under the North Carolina Endangered Species Act.

== Conservation and restoration ==
Crystal skippers rely on flowering plants for nectar and seaside little bluestem as their primary larval host plant. Preserving native dune vegetation or actively planting seaside little bluestem helps maintain suitable habitat for the species and other native fauna.

Native flowers that are commonly used for sources of nectar during the spring Crystal skipper brood include: Canada toadflax (Nuttallanthus canadensis (L.) D.A. Sutton), white clover (Trifolium repens L.), and seabeach evening primrose (Oenothera humifusa Nutt.). The summer brood of Crystal skippers frequent morning glories (Ipomoea spp), specifically saltmarsh morning glory (Ipomoea sagittata Poir.) and beach morning glory (Ipomoea imperati (Vahl) Griseb.).

Other nectar plants for the Crystal skipper include yellow thistle (Cirsium horridulum Michx.), risky tread-softly or spurge nettle (Cnidoscolus stimulosus), southern dewberry (Rubus trivialis), coastal prickly pear (Opuntia pusilla), whitemouth dayflower (Commelina erecta L.), oakleaf fleabane (Erigeron quercifolius Lam.), pinkladies (Oenothera speciosa Nutt.), lance-leaved Coreopsis (Coreopsis lanceolata L.), largeleaf pennywort (Hydrocotyle bonariensis Comm. ex Lam.), blue-eyed grass (Sisyrinchium L. spp.), chicory (Cichorium intybus L.), Japanese honeysuckle (Lonicera japonica Thunb.), wood sorrel (Oxalis L. spp.), common dandelion (Taraxacum officinale F.H. Wigg.), common vetch (Vicia sativa L.), seaside brookweed (Samolus valerandi L.), lyreleaf sage (Salvia lyrata L.), downy milkpea (Galactia volubilis (L.) Britton), gulf-coast swallowwort (Seutera angustifolia (Pers.) Fishbein & W.D. Stevens), pretty verbena (Verbena bonariensis L.), and Virginia saltmarsh mallow (Kosteletzkya pentacarpos (L.) Ledeb.).

Non-native plants (also called exotic plants) that are a common source of nectar include Lantana species.

== History of Crystal skipper research ==
Early research: 1978-2002

The Crystal skipper was first collected in 1978 by Eric L. Quinter. In the early to mid-1980s, Dr. Burns collected specimens he used to distinguish the Crystal skipper from other species in the same genus. In 2001 and 2002, Dr. Stephen P. Hall with the US Fish and Wildlife Service conducted a survey for Crystal skippers across the entire coastline of North Carolina. Dr. Hall did not find any Crystal skippers outside of its known 30-mile range.

First published studies of the Crystal skipper: 2005-2009

The first bout of intensive research on the Crystal skipper happened between 2005 and 2009, when Dr. Allison K. Leidner conducted her dissertation research on the Crystal skipper under Dr. Nick M. Haddad at NC State University. Dr. Leidner evaluated how the Crystal skipper has responded to fragmentation due to urbanization in its Bogue Bank range using behavioral, mark-recapture, and population genetic studies.

Behaviorally, Dr. Leidner released Crystal skippers at the edges of four different habitat types: dune - beach, dune - maritime forest/shrub, dune - urban, and beach - ocean, and recorded which habitat the butterfly picked to fly into. This allows one to determine if a Crystal skipper will even attempt to enter a habitat type. Dr. Leidner found Crystal skippers are more likely to fly into dunes than any other habitat type, but only the beach habitat was a strong barrier for the Crystal skippers.

While a Crystal skipper might enter a habitat type, they may never make it through the habitat type. Using mark-recapture (MR), Dr. Leidner was able to assess the movement of Crystal skippers through continuous dune habitat and between dune habitat patches that were separated by urban areas. In MR, researchers go to a site, catch butterflies with nets, carefully remove them from the nets with butterfly forceps, and then write a unique alphanumeric code on their wings, and release the butterfly. They then come back to the same sites several times over the adult butterfly life span and catch more butterflies, some of which they have previously caught. Dr. Leidner found that urbanization does not impact movement rates of Crystal skippers between dune habitat patches.

Lastly, a Crystal skipper may enter and move through a habitat type, but not establish a breeding population in the new location. Using population genetics, Dr. Leidner looked at the relatedness of Crystal skippers from Bear Island to Fort Macon State Park to assess the variability in genetics across the skippers’ range and if there are barriers to gene flow, such as urban areas or ocean inlets. She found 3 genetically distinct regions in the range that were separated by natural features: an ocean inlet and a 10 km stretch of maritime forest where there are no dunes.

The research Dr. Leidner conducted overall indicates that skippers are not affected by urbanization in their movements and will be able to persist as long as there are enough good “stepping stone” patches of habitat.
