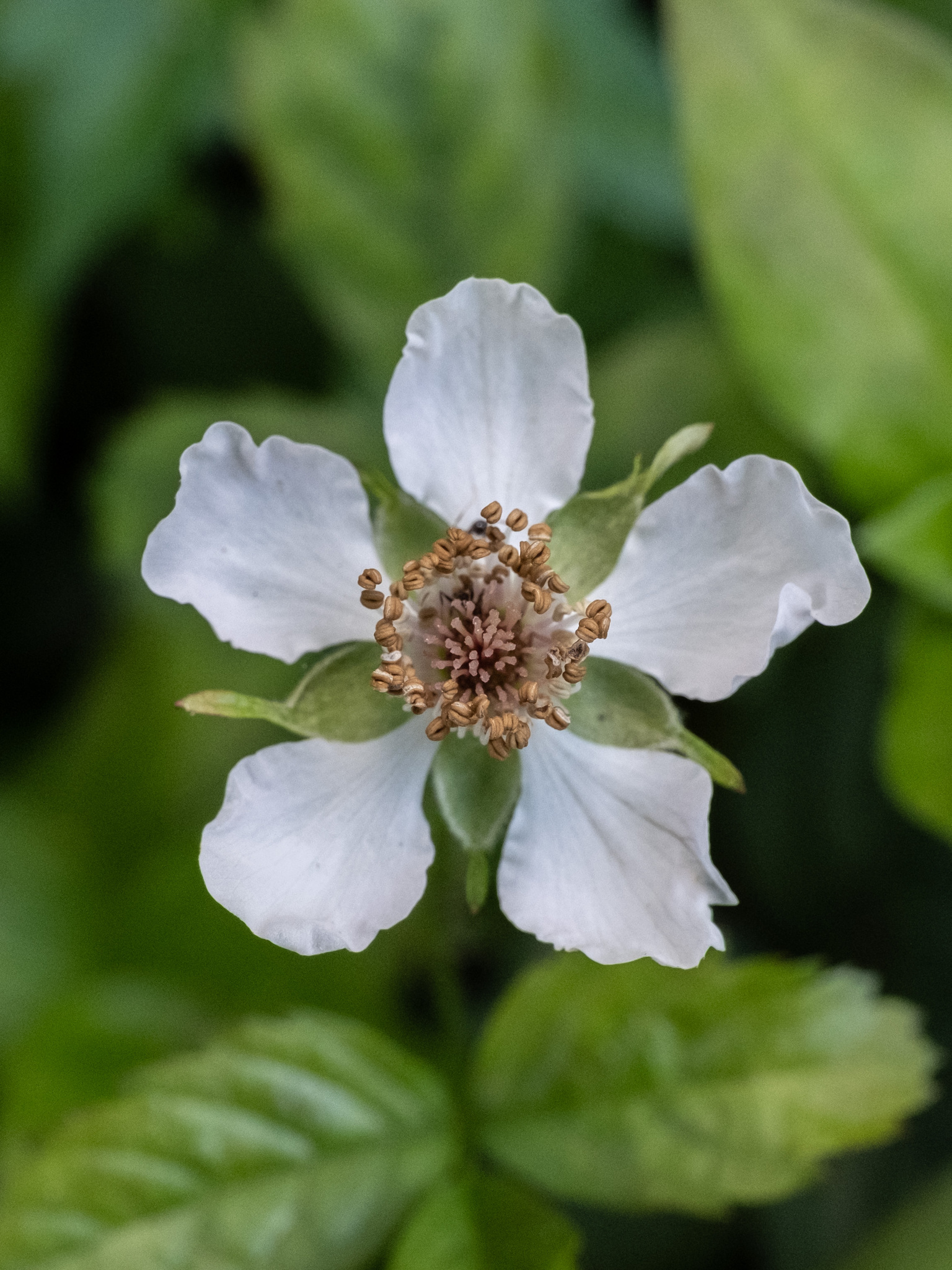

Scientific classification
- Kingdom: Plantae
- Clade: Tracheophytes
- Clade: Angiosperms
- Clade: Eudicots
- Clade: Rosids
- Order: Rosales
- Family: Rosaceae
- Genus: Rubus
- Species: R. trivialis

Binomial name
- Rubus trivialis Michx.

Synonyms
- Rubus ictus L.H.Bailey

= Rubus trivialis =

Berry and plant

Rubus trivialis, commonly known as southern dewberry, is a species of flowering plant in the rose family (Rosaceae). It is distinguished from northern dewberry (R. flagellaris) by its hispid stems. It is a perennial herb and blooms from March to April.

R. trivialis is native to the southern United States and northern Mexico. It has been observed within habitats such as tidal marshes, longleaf pinelands, and coastal hammocks, as well as within disturbed habitats such as alongside roads.
