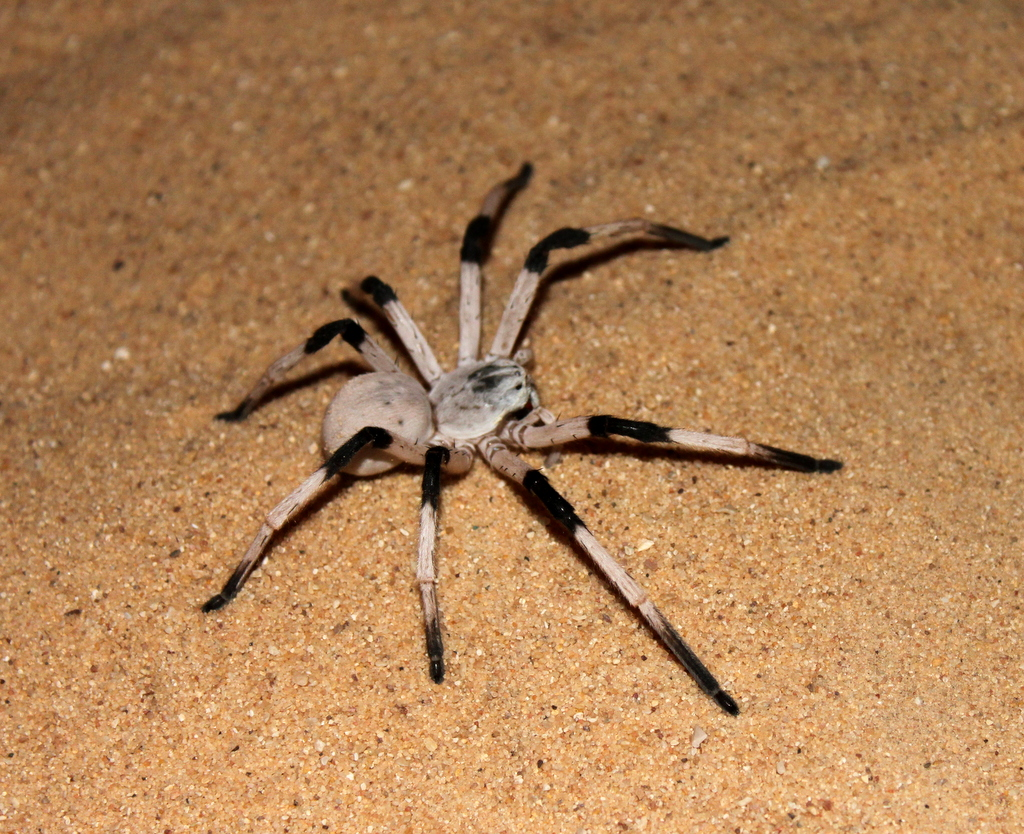

Scientific classification
- Kingdom: Animalia
- Phylum: Arthropoda
- Subphylum: Chelicerata
- Class: Arachnida
- Order: Araneae
- Infraorder: Araneomorphae
- Family: Sparassidae
- Genus: Cerbalus
- Species: C. aravaensis

Binomial name
- Cerbalus aravaensis Levy, 2007

= Cerbalus aravaensis =

Species of spider

Cerbalus aravaensis is a huntsman spider found in the southern Arava Valley of Israel and Jordan. The species was first described by Gershom Levy of the Hebrew University of Jerusalem in 2007, though news agencies later reported it in 2010 as a new discovery (with a slightly different spelling) by a team of biologists from the University of Haifa. The spider has a leg-span of 14 centimeters (5.5 in), making it one of the largest member of the family Sparassidae in the Middle East. Males have a body length of 1.85–2.40 centimeters (0.73–0.94 in), while females' body length is 2.20–2.65 centimeters (0.87–1.04 in).

== Habitat ==
Cerbalus aravaensis lives in sand dunes, and partly stable sands at the edge of salt-marshes. It is nocturnal and is most-active in the hotter summer months. It constructs underground dens with hinged, trap-door-like operculum made of sand and silk, in order to disguise the entrance from predators.

== Conservation ==
The Sands of Samar, the last remaining sand dunes in the southern Arava region of Israel and home to Cerbalus aravaensis, are disappearing. The sands once covered as many as 7 km^{2} (2.7 sq mi), but now cover less than 3 km^{2} (1.2 sq mi) due to re-zoning of areas for agriculture and sand quarries. Mining projects on the sands are intended to be renewed in the near future and thus the habitat's future is uncertain. Should the Sands of Samar be destroyed, it is unlikely that Cerbalus aravaensis would survive.

== Diet ==
The Cerbalus aravaensis mainly eats small invertebrate including beetles. The Cerbalus aravaensis is known to eat geckos called Stenodactylus doriae (Middle Eastern short-fingered geckos).
