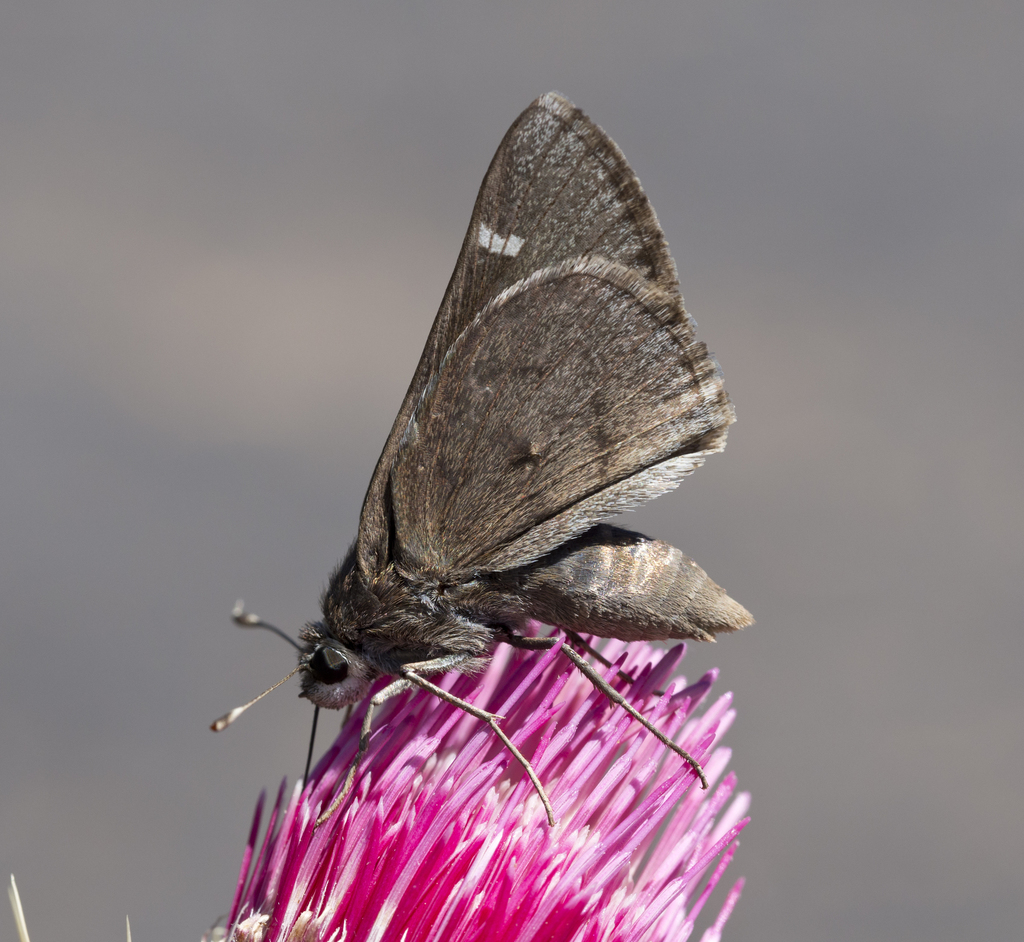

Conservation status
- Apparently Secure (NatureServe)

Scientific classification
- Kingdom: Animalia
- Phylum: Arthropoda
- Class: Insecta
- Order: Lepidoptera
- Family: Hesperiidae
- Genus: Atrytonopsis
- Species: A. vierecki

Binomial name
- Atrytonopsis vierecki (Skinner, 1902)

= Atrytonopsis vierecki =

Species of butterfly

Atrytonopsis vierecki, or Viereck's skipper, is a species of grass skipper in the butterfly family of Hesperiidae. It is found in North America.

The MONA or Hodges number for Atrytonopsis vierecki is 4083.
