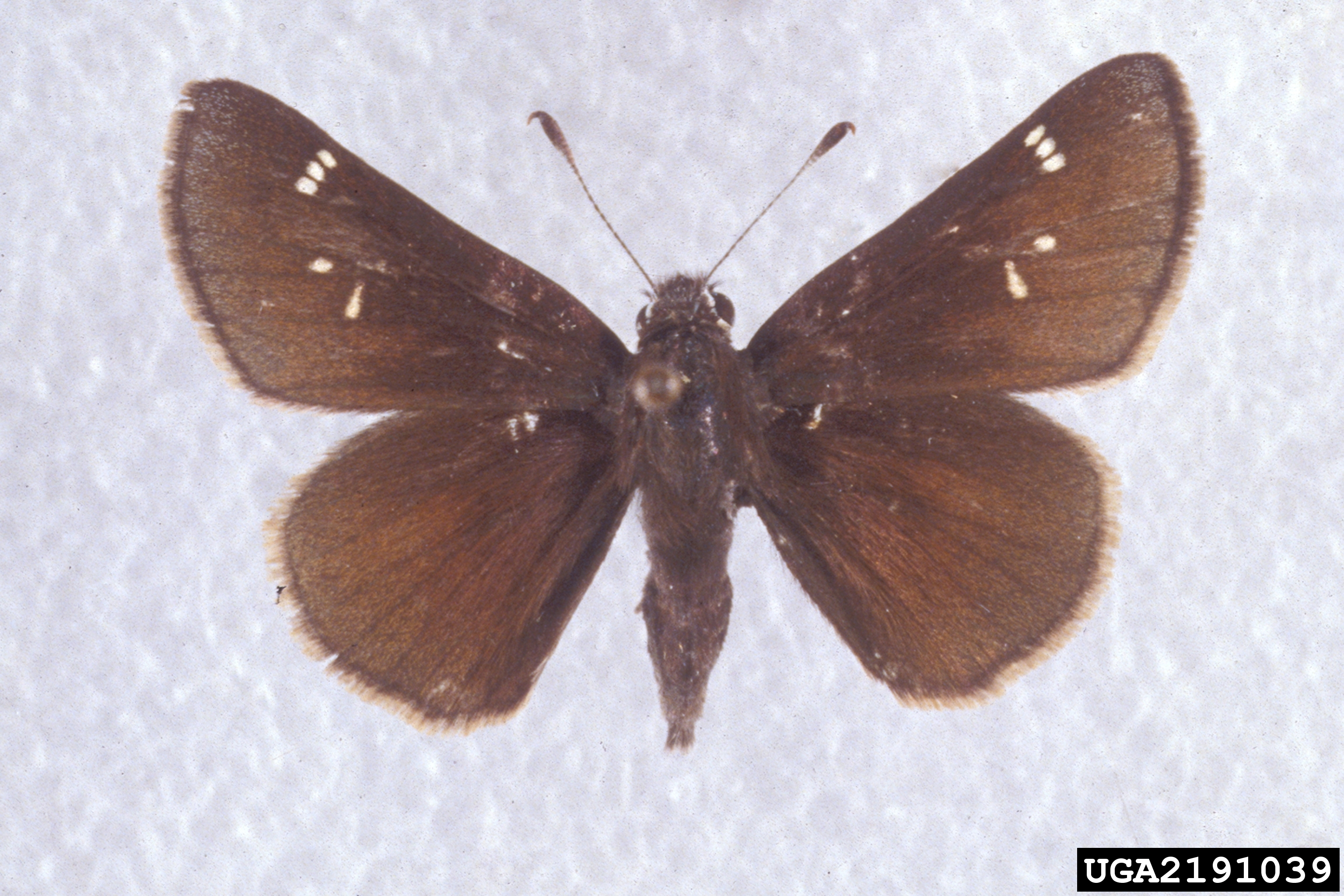

Conservation status
- Apparently Secure (NatureServe)

Scientific classification
- Domain: Eukaryota
- Kingdom: Animalia
- Phylum: Arthropoda
- Class: Insecta
- Order: Lepidoptera
- Family: Hesperiidae
- Genus: Atrytonopsis
- Species: A. hianna

Binomial name
- Atrytonopsis hianna (Scudder, 1868)

Synonyms
- Atrytonopsis grotei (Plötz, 1883); Lerema hianna; Atrytonopsis turneri Freeman, 1948

= Atrytonopsis hianna =

Species of butterfly

Atrytonopsis hianna, the dusted skipper, is a butterfly of the family Hesperiidae. It is found in the United States from eastern Wyoming, central Colorado, northern New Mexico and central Texas east to New Hampshire and Massachusetts, south to peninsular Florida and the Gulf Coast.

The wingspan is 32–43 mm. There is one generation with adults on from May to June in the north. In the south there are two generations with adults on wing from March to October in Florida.

The larvae feed on Andropogon gerardi and Schizachyrium scoparium.

== Subspecies ==
- Atrytonopsis hianna hianna
- Atrytonopsis hianna turneri (Kansas, Oklahoma)
