= Israel Union for Environmental Defense =

The Israel Union for Environmental Defense (Hebrew: אדם טבע ודין, Adam Teva veDin, lit. Man Nature and Law) is an environmentalist group in Israel.

== Tel Aviv islands ==
In November 2002 the Israeli Government appointed a six-member committee to explore the financial feasibility of creating two islands off the coast of Tel Aviv. One of the islands would be for an airport, similar to the Kobe airport in Japan, and the other island would have houses, commercial offices and tourism. Then IUED executive director Phil Warburg called the proposal a "technological fantasy that is highly improper [because of] Israel's economic and environmental constraints."

== See also ==
- Alon Tal
