= Romanian Jews in Israel =

Total population
- From 205,600 to possibly 450,000

Regions with significant populations
- Tel Aviv, Jerusalem, Haifa, Northern District

Languages
- Hebrew (main language for all generations); Older generation: Romanian language, Yiddish

Religion
- Judaism

Romanian Jews in Israel refers to the community of Romanian Jews who migrated to Israel beginning in the later 19th century, continued migrating to Israel after the formation of the modern state in 1948, and live within the state of Israel. The descendants of those who made aliyah in the 1930s, the wave of emigrants after World War II or after the fall of communism, with their children and grandchildren born in Israel, represent about 10% of the population. According to the Association of Romanian Journalists Abroad, about 400,000 Romanian Jews live in Israel. They have established several kibbutzim, moshavim and towns (Kiryat Bialik, Kiryat Tiv'on, Rosh Pinna, Zikhron Ya'akov). Between 1882 and 1884, Romanian Jews in Israel already established nine localities.

== History ==
Mass emigration to Israel ensued (see Bricha and Aliyah). According to Sachar, for the first two post-war years, tens of thousands of Romanian Jews left for Israel; the Romanian government did not try to stop them, especially due to its desire to reduce its historically suspect and now impoverished Jewish minority. Afterwards, Jewish emigration began to encounter obstacles. In 1948, the year of Israeli independence, Zionism came under renewed suspicion, and the government began a campaign of liquidation against Zionist funds and training farms. However, emigration was not completely banned; Romanian Foreign Minister Ana Pauker, herself a Jew with a father and brother in Israel, negotiated an agreement with Israeli ambassador Reuven Rubin, a Romanian immigrant to Israel, under which the Romanian government would allow 4,000 Jews a month to emigrate to Israel; this decision was at least partially influenced by a large Jewish Agency bribe to the Romanian government. This agreement applied mainly to ruined businessmen and other economically "redundant" Jews. Around this time, Israel also secured another agreement with the Romanian government, under which Romania issued 100,000 exit visas for Jews and Israel supplied Romania with oil drills and pipes to aid the struggling Romanian oil industry. By December 1951, about 115,000 Romanian Jews had emigrated to Israel.

Throughout the period of Communist rule, Romania allowed limited numbers of Jews to emigrate to Israel, in exchange for much-needed Israeli economic aid. By 1965, Israel was funding agricultural and industrial projects throughout Romania, and in exchange, Romania allowed emigration of limited numbers of Jews to Israel. When Nicolae Ceaușescu came to power in 1965, he initially ended the trade in deference to the Eastern bloc's Arab allies. However, by 1969, he decided to exchange Jews for cash from Israel. Ceaușescu wanted economic independence from the Soviet Union, which was content to keep Romania a backwater and as nothing more than a supplier of raw materials, but to fund economic projects, he needed hard cash. As a result, from then until the Ceaușescu regime fell in 1989, about 1,500 Jews a year were granted exit visas to Israel in exchange for a payment of cash for every Jew allowed to leave, in addition to other Israeli aid. The exact payments were determined by the age, education, profession, employment, and family status of the emigrant. Israel paid a minimum of $2,000 per head for every emigrant, and paid prices in the range of $25,000 for doctors or scientists. In addition to these payments, Israel also secured loans for Romania and paid off the interest itself, and supplied the Romanian Army with military equipment.

As a result of aliyah, the Romanian-Jewish community was gradually depleted. By 1987, just 23,000 Jews were left in Romania, half of whom were over 65 years old.

== Relations with Romanian culture ==
Romanian Jews in Israel have strong relations with Romanian culture. Moreover, there is an intense activity among writers of Romanian language. In Israel exist 11 associations of writers in foreign languages, including the Association of Israeli Writers of Romanian Language (Romanian: Asociația Scriitorilor Israelieni de Limbă Română). Likewise, there are publications in Romanian languages, weekly, monthly or quarterly, plus several local issues.

Romania has an embassy in Tel Aviv, three honorary consulates in Jerusalem, Beersheba and Haifa and a cultural institute in Tel Aviv.

== Representation in popular culture ==
- In the teen film Lemon Popsicle, Stella ("A-cumming Stella", portrayed by Ophelia Shtruhl) she is immigrant from Romania and in the Sequel "Going Steady" Tammy (Yvonne Michaels) she is daughter of immigrants from Romania.
- The plot of the film The Matchmaker is about Holocaust survivors from Romania who live in Haifa.

== See also ==
- List of Romanian Jews in Israel
- History of the Jews in Romania
- Aliyah from Romania
- List of Romanian Jews
- Israel–Romania relations
