= Elbe Day =

Meeting of American and Soviet troops on April 25, 1945, near the Elbe River in Germany

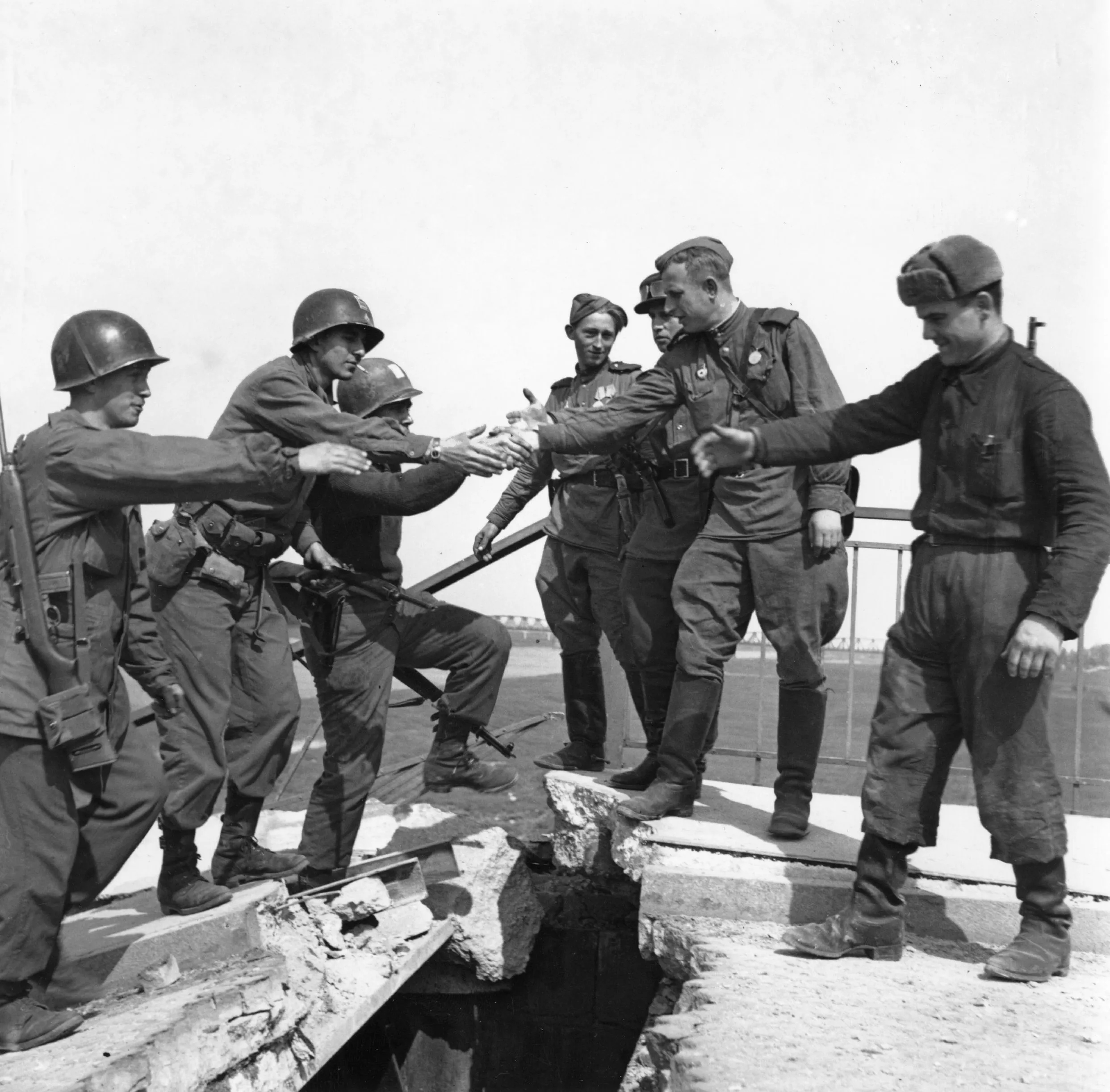
Soviet Lieutenant Charles Thau (center, facing camera) behind handshake, with later identified U.S. soldiers Bernard E. Kirschenbaum (second from left) and Richard Johnson (third from left).

Elbe Day is the name given to April 25, 1945, when American and Soviet troops met near the Elbe River in Germany toward the end of World War II. The encounters occurred as American forces advanced eastward and Soviet forces advanced westward, approaching one another across central Germany. The first documented contact between the two armies took place near Strehla, while the best-known meeting occurred later that day at Torgau, where American and Soviet soldiers met at the damaged Elbe bridge.

The famous Elbe Bridge handshake photograph above was taken by Associated Press photographer Allan Jackson on April 26, 1945, during celebratory activities following the initial contact between American and Soviet troops the previous day. It became one of the most recognizable images associated with the end of World War II in Europe.

The link-up demonstrated that Nazi Germany had effectively been divided by the advancing Allied armies. It became an enduring symbol of cooperation between the United States and the Soviet Union during the war, although their alliance soon gave way to the geopolitical rivalry of the Cold War. The encounter is commemorated annually in Torgau and is commonly known as ‘‘Elbe Day’’ in English and ‘‘Elbe-Tag’’ in German.

== History ==
=== Military situation ===
By April 1945, Allied forces were closing in on the remnants of Nazi Germany from both east and west. Soviet forces had advanced through Eastern Europe and were approaching Berlin, while American and other Western Allied forces had crossed the Rhine and continued eastward into Germany.

American forces of the U.S. First Army were operating west of the Elbe and were ordered to limit their advance east of the Mulde River. Soviet forces of the First Ukrainian Front were advancing toward the Elbe from the east. Small reconnaissance patrols crossed the lines separating the armies and made contact in several locations on April 25.

The meetings were important both militarily and symbolically. They established contact between the advancing Allied armies in central Germany and demonstrated the progress of the campaign against Nazi Germany. The encounters also became enduring images of cooperation between the Western Allies and the Soviet Union.

=== First contact near Strehla ===
The first documented contact between American and Soviet forces occurred on the morning of April 25, 1945, near Strehla, north of Torgau.

Flags displayed at Strehla commemorating the first encounter between American and Soviet troops on April 25, 1945.

First Lieutenant Albert Kotzebue led an American intelligence and reconnaissance patrol from the 273rd Infantry Regiment of the 69th Infantry Division. Near the village of Leckwitz, the patrol encountered a Soviet cavalryman. After establishing that the soldier was Soviet, Kotzebue and his men continued toward the Elbe and crossed the river by boat, where they met additional Soviet personnel.

The Soviet troops were part of the formations advancing toward the river from the east. Lieutenant Colonel Alexander Gordeyev, commander of the Soviet 175th Rifle Regiment, subsequently met Kotzebue’s patrol. The Americans and Soviets arranged a further meeting near the village of Kreinitz, where the patrols could communicate more easily.

The encounter near Strehla preceded the better-known meeting at Torgau by several hours. Although the Torgau meeting became the most widely publicized event associated with Elbe Day, the earlier encounter was the first documented contact of U.S. and Soviet patrols in the area.

=== Meeting at Torgau ===
Later on April 25, another American reconnaissance patrol reached Torgau. The patrol was led by Second Lieutenant William D. Robertson and included Frank Huff, James McDonnell, and Paul Staub. The soldiers were searching the area near the Elbe and trying to establish contact with Soviet forces on the opposite bank.

The Elbe bridge at Torgau had been destroyed, leaving its damaged steel girders above the river. Robertson’s patrol approached the bridge and saw Soviet soldiers on the opposite side. After efforts to establish communication, soldiers began crossing the damaged structure toward one another.

At approximately 4 p.m., the patrols met on the ruined bridge. The American soldiers were greeted by Soviet personnel, including soldiers associated with Lieutenant Alexander Silvashko. The troops shook hands and embraced, celebrating their contact after years of fighting against the same enemy on separate fronts.

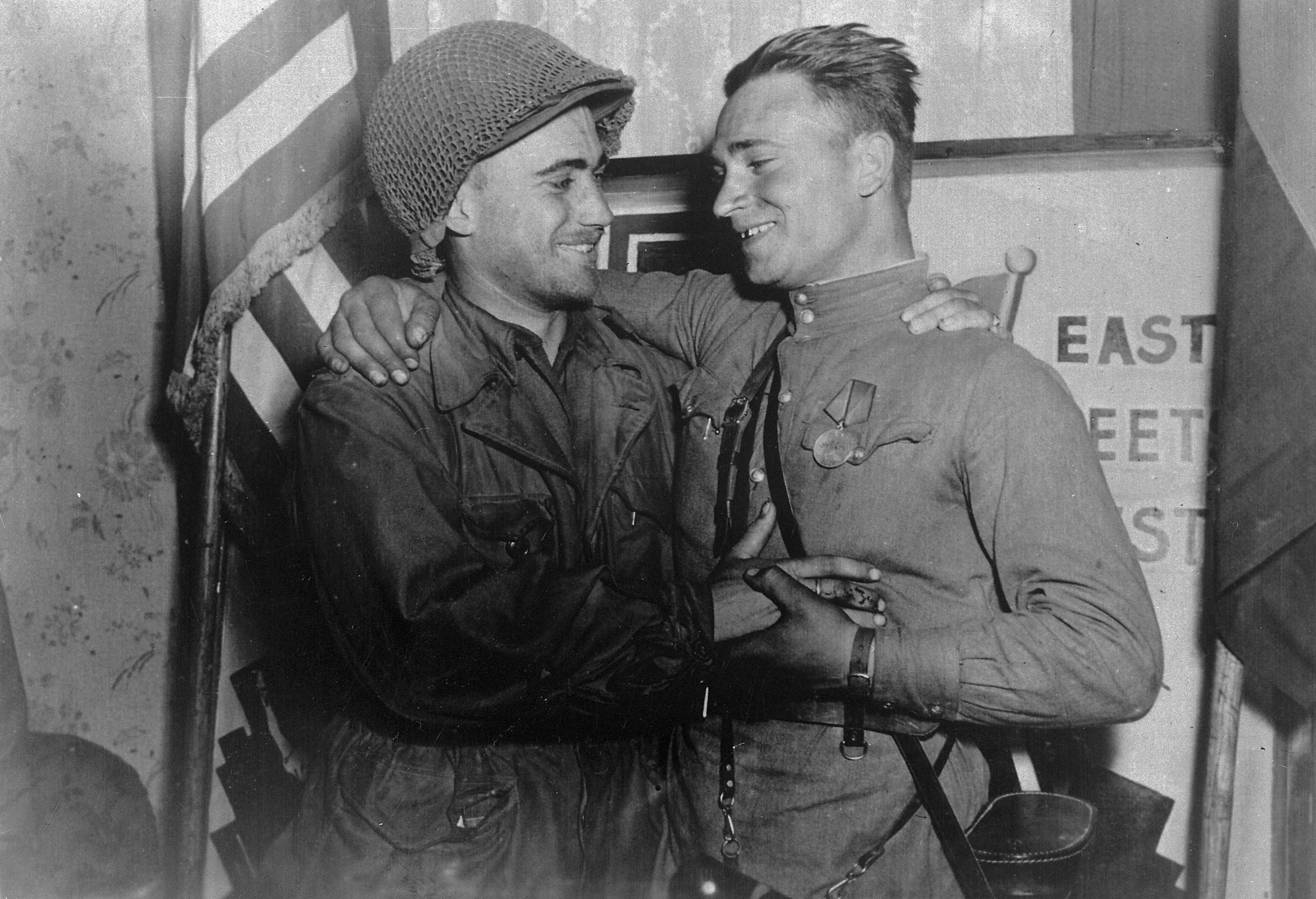
In a staged photograph, U.S. Army Second Lieutenant William Robertson and Red Army Lieutenant Alexander Silvashko are shown after the initial encounter at Torgau.

The meeting at Torgau became the best-known encounter of Elbe Day. Its dramatic location on the destroyed bridge, together with the photographs taken afterward, made it a powerful visual symbol of the Allied armies joining forces in Germany. The earlier meeting near Strehla remained historically important as the first documented contact, but Torgau became the principal site of public commemoration and celebrations.

Linkup celebrations of the occasion began on April 26, including trading of artifacts between soldiers, fraternization, and meals attended by American and Soviet military personnel.

American and Soviet forces dining together under a commemorative banner in Torgau, Germany, on April 26, 1945.

Identities of the soldiers depicted in the Elbe Bridge handshake photograph were the subject of subsequent investigation, leading to the 2008 correction of an earlier misidentification which existed for over a decade.

=== Commanders’ meeting ===
On April 26, American and Soviet commanders met at Torgau to formalize the link-up. The American delegation included Major General Emil F. Reinhardt, commander of the 69th Infantry Division, while the Soviet delegation included Major General Vladimir Rusakov, commander of the 58th Guards Rifle Division.

The commanders’ meeting took place at the former Wehrmacht military prison known as Brückenkopf. The encounter also marked the end of Torgau’s role as a major center of the German military justice system.

The Soviet, American, British, and French governments also issued statements reaffirming their determination to complete the defeat of Nazi Germany. U.S. President Harry S. Truman issued a statement on April 25 announcing the junction of Anglo-American and Soviet forces in Germany.

== Significance ==
The meeting of American and Soviet troops on the Elbe was an important milestone in the final phase of World War II in Europe. The armies had advanced from opposite directions and were now in contact in central Germany, while Berlin was under attack by Soviet forces. The link-up confirmed that the remaining German forces were being cut off and that the defeat of Nazi Germany was approaching.

The encounter also became a symbol of cooperation between the United States and the Soviet Union. During the war, the two countries had been major partners in the coalition against Nazi Germany, despite profound differences in their political and economic systems. The handshake photographs conveyed a message of unity at a time when the defeat of Nazi Germany was imminent.

The wartime alliance did not last. After the war, disagreements over Eastern Europe, Germany, and the international order contributed to the emergence of the Cold War. Nevertheless, the Elbe meeting continued to be remembered as an example of cooperation between the two countries against a common enemy.

== Commemorations ==
=== Torgau ===
The Monument to the Meeting (Denkmal der Begegnung) in Torgau commemorates the encounter between American and Soviet troops in April 1945.

Torgau became the principal site of commemoration for the Elbe meeting. A monument commemorating the encounter was erected in 1945. The city continues to hold anniversary events associated with April 25, bringing together visitors, officials, and representatives of countries involved in the victory.

The commemorations include ceremonies at historical sites connected with the encounter, cultural events, readings, and film screenings. They emphasize both the historical meeting and the hope for peace and international cooperation.

The designation ‘‘Elbe Day’’ became established as a common English-language name for the commemorations. In German, the event is known as ‘‘Elbe-Tag’’. The commemorative tradition developed over time, particularly following German reunification, as the historical meeting became a focus for remembrance and public events in Torgau.

=== United States commemorations ===
The meeting has also been commemorated in the United States. American and Russian representatives have gathered at memorial events to remember the encounter and the wartime alliance between their countries.

On April 25, 2010, U.S. President Barack Obama and Russian President Dmitry Medvedev issued a joint statement commemorating the 65th anniversary of the meeting. The statement recalled the cooperation between American and Soviet troops and invoked the “spirit of the Elbe” as a symbol of what countries could achieve by working together.

=== Cultural references ===
The meeting at Torgau has appeared in films, music, and other cultural works about the end of World War II. The Soviet film ‘’Encounter at the Elbe’’ (’‘Vstrecha na Elbe’’), released in 1949 and directed by Grigori Aleksandrov, used postwar Germany as the setting for a story about relations between Soviet and American forces. The film reflected the political atmosphere of the early Cold War and presented the former allies through the lens of contemporary Soviet-American relations.

The phrase “Spirit of the Elbe” has been used in later political and cultural discussions to refer to the possibility of cooperation between the United States and Russia. The phrase was invoked in the 2010 joint statement by Obama and Medvedev, which connected the historical meeting with the goal of cooperation in contemporary international affairs.

The event has also been referenced in music and popular culture. American singer-songwriter Fred Small wrote “At the Elbe,” a song inspired by the meeting and its message of peace. The encounter has also appeared in historical documentaries and works examining the final days of the war in Europe.

== See also ==
- Elbe Bridge handshake photograph
- Charles Thau
- Allied-occupied Germany
- Line of Contact
- Eastern Front (World War II)
- Western Allied invasion of Germany
- History of Germany (1945–1990)

== Bibliography ==
- MacDonald, Charles B. (1973). The Last Offensive (PDF). United States Army in World War II: European Theater of Operations. Washington, D.C.: Office of the Chief of Military History, Department of the Army.
- "American and Russian Troops Meet at the Elbe". National Archives and Records Administration.
- Getty Images (Hulton Archive) (April 6, 2014). "US & Russian Troops (Torgau, 26 April 1945)".
- United States Holocaust Memorial Museum. "Soviet and US Troops Meet at Torgau". Holocaust Encyclopedia.
- Haynie, Olivia (April 22, 2025). "Hidden in a Famous WWII Photo: Two Heroic Jewish Stories". The Forward.
- Heinz, Joachim; Harmann, Markus (April 25, 2025). "Handschlag von Torgau: Sieben Soldaten und ein Bild für die Ewigkeit". Der Spiegel (in German).
- de Keghel, Isabelle (2009). "Meeting on the Elbe (Vstrecha na El'be): A Visual Representation of the Incipient Cold War from a Soviet Perspective". Cold War History. 9 (4): 455–467. doi:10.1080/14682740903198197.
- Oleschinski, Wolfgang. "Encounter on the Elbe". Torgau Tourism.
- "Ende der Wehrmachtjustiz: Handschlag an der Elbe (25. April 1945)" [End of Wehrmacht military justice: Handshake on the Elbe (April 25, 1945)]. Stiftung Sächsische Gedenkstätten, Erinnerungsort Torgau.
- Truman, Harry S. (April 25, 1945). "Statement by the President Announcing the Junction of Anglo-American and Soviet Forces". Harry S. Truman Presidential Library and Museum.
- FitzGerald, Nora (May 19, 1988). "Front to Front: Soviet-American Book Retells Elbe Meeting That Spelled End for Nazis". Los Angeles Times.
- Magnúsdóttir, Rósa (March 17, 2018). "Celebrating the Spirit of the Elbe: From the 1950s Revival of Soviet-American Relations to the Reset of the 2010s". Zeitgeschichte-online.
- Barack Obama and Dmitry Medvedev (April 25, 2010). "Joint Statement by Presidents of the United States of America and the Russian Federation Commemorating the 65th Anniversary of the Meeting on the Elbe". Obama White House Archives.
- Wilms, Carolin (April 24, 2015). "Spirit of the Elbe". Dayton Daily News.
- Ziemke, Earl F. (1975). The U.S. Army in World War II: The Red Army and the Elbe. Center of Military History, United States Army.
