= Samuel Brand =

Samuel Brand (Hebrew: שמואל ברנד) was a German Jew who became officially the first immigrant to enter the State of Israel after its creation on 14 May 1948. He was also a survivor of the Buchenwald concentration camp in Nazi Germany. Brand carried with him the first visa ever issued by the Government of Israel.

== Immigration ==
Before the establishment of the state, Jewish immigration to Israel had been severely restricted by the then-governing British authorities of the Mandate of Palestine. There were rigid quotas and certificates required. Tens of thousands of Jews who arrived without certificates were regarded as illegal immigrants and chased by British police. Even after the end of the Second World War and the discovery of the full extent of the Holocaust, Jews were restricted from migrating to Palestine. As a result, Jews launched a major organized operation called the Berihah to bring Holocaust survivors to Palestine.

After the Israeli Declaration of Independence was proclaimed on 14 May 1948, the newly formed Government of Israel ended all restrictions to immigration. The Law of Return was passed in 1950, granting automatic citizenship to Jewish immigrants.

== Biography ==
Samuel Brand survived the Holocaust in the Buchenwald concentration camp, which was the largest on German soil. Although an old man by 1948, Brand chose to emigrate from post-war Germany to the newly created Jewish homeland. He traveled on the Greek ship SS Teti, which arrived at the port of Tel Aviv, Israel's largest city, on 14 May. He was the first person from the ship to set foot on Israeli soil. He was welcomed by Israeli leader and future Prime Minister Golda Meir in an official reception, even though the first air raids by the Egyptian air force in the 1948 Arab-Israeli War had just begun.

== First official visa ==
Samuel Brand carried a piece of paper that was the first official visa issued by the Immigration Department of the Government of Israel. It said:

The right to settle in Israel is hereby given.

== See also ==
- Aliyah
- Zionism
