= List of ambassadors of Romania to Israel =

Coordinates: 32.085923°N 34.777879°E

Ambassador of Romania to Israel
- Ambasadorului României în Israel
- Coat of arms of Romania.svg
- Incumbent; Radu Ioanid since March 30, 2020
- Inaugural holder: Nicolae Cioroiu
- Formation: September 21, 1949

The Romanian ambassador in Tel Aviv is the official representative of the Government in Bucharest to the Government of Israel.

== List of representatives ==
Designation	Diplomatic accreditation	Ambassador	Observations	List of prime ministers of Romania	List of prime ministers of Israel	Term end
September 11, 1949	September 21, 1949	Nicolae Cioroiu	(* 1908) Envoy Extraordinary and Minister Plenipotentiary. The Romanian minister in Israel, Nicolae Cioroiu, was recalled to Bucharest in January 1950 following the recall of the Israeli minister from Bucharest (see also Doc. 246, n. 7). 4. Reuven Rubin, Israel's minister to Romania. He had previously been extraordinary and plenipotentiary minister in Rome. From 1950 to 1952 he was Romanian ambassador to the United Kingdom. From 1952 to 1956 he was Deputy Minister of Foreign Affairs after the removal of Ana Pauker. From 1956 to 1957 he was Romanian ambassador to China and Hanoi. From 1957 to 1961 he was Romanian ambassador to India. In 1971 he became director of the History Museum of the PCR. In 1974 he was conspicuous for having "unofficial contacts" with diplomats accredited in Bucharest and making "inappropriate remarks" about the party leadership, got in trouble with the Securitate.	Constantin Ion Parhon	David Ben-Gurion	January 1950
July 4, 1956	July 4, 1956	Gheorghe Chitic	Chargé d'affaires	Chivu Stoica	David Ben-Gurion	1957
1957	July 19, 1957	Petre Manu	In 1961 he became Romanian envoy to Sweden	Chivu Stoica	David Ben-Gurion	1961
February 21, 1966	February 21, 1966	Valeriu Georgescu		Chivu Stoica	Levi Eshkol	1971
December 25, 1971	January 23, 1972	Ion Covaci	Radio Romania International (December 25) said that Ion Covaci has been appointed ambassador to Israel. In 1960 he was third secretary in Tel Aviv. In 1968 he was ambassador in Central Africa. In 1970 he was ambassador in Rangoon. On May 15, 1974 he negotiated during the Ma'alot massacre. On March 5, 1992 he was designated ambassador to Cairo. Ambasadorul României în Israel [Ion Covaci] şi-a prezentat scrisorile de acreditare. Decretul nr. 443/1971 pentru rechemarea tovarășului Valeriu Georgescu din calitatea de ambasador extraordinar și plenipotențiar al Republicii Socialiste România în Israel și acreditarea tovarășului Ioan Covaci în calitatea de ambasador extraordinar și plenipotențiar al Republicii Socialiste România în Israel. 1980 Yitzhak Navon received Romanian Ambassador Ion Covaci who paid his farewall call.	Ion Gheorghe Maurer	Golda Meir	1980
1984	1984	Constantin Vasìliu	10 February 1989 Romania, Tel Aviv Agerpres, 9 February 1989 — Yitzhaq Shamir, prime minister of the state of Israel, received Ion Stoian, secretary of the CC of the RCP, who is in Israel as special envoy of the Romanian head of state.	Constantin Dăscălescu	Shimon Peres	1986
August 6, 1991	August 6, 1991	Radu Homescu	ambasadorului României în Israel, Radu Homescu	Petre Roman	Yitzhak Shamir	June 30, 1995
June 30, 1995	June 30, 1995	Mircea Mironenco	Charge d'affaires	Nicolae Văcăroiu	Yitzhak Rabin	
June 17, 1997	June 9, 1997	Gheorghe Popescu	In 1973 he was Romanian ambassador to the Central African Republic Domnul Gheorghe Popescu se acreditează în calitatea de ambasador extraordinar și plenipotențiar al României în Israel. DECRETUL nr. 220 din 9 iunie 1997 privind acreditarea unui ambasador Publicat în M. Of. nr. 126 din 19 Iunie 1997 în	Victor Ciorbea	Benjamin Netanyahu	2000
2000	September 12, 2000	Mariana Stoica	Valeria Mariana Stoica	Mugur Isărescu	Ehud Barak	2006
April 18, 2007	December 3, 2007	Edward Iosiper	DECRET nr. 746 din 31 iulie 2007privind acreditarea unui ambasador, Publicat în MONITORUL OFICIAL nr. 526 din 2 august 2007]</ref>	Călin Popescu-Tăriceanu	Ehud Olmert	2013
September 1, 2013	January 2, 2014	Andreea Păstârnac	Born September 24, 1967, in Brașov. From 2006 to 2011, he was Ambassador of Romania to Cyprus, and in September 2013 he became Ambassador of Romania to Israel.	Victor Ponta	Benjamin Netanyahu	January 7, 2017
January 7, 2017	January 7, 2017	Ovidiu Ierulescu	Chargé d'affaires a.i., Minister Plenipotentiary	Dacian Cioloș	Benjamin Netanyahu	March 29, 2020

== See also ==
- Israel–Romania relations
