= List of Romanian Jews in Israel =

This is a list of notable Romanian Jews in Israel.

- Aaron Aaronsohn (1876–1919), agronomist, botanist and Zionist activist; discoverer of the wild precursor of domesticated wheat
- Yigal Allon (1918–1980), politician and general
- Mosko Alkalai (1931–2008), actor
- Richard Wurmbrand (1909–2001), Christian minister, founder of Voice of the Martyrs
- Jean Ancel (1940–2008), author and historian specialised in the history of 20th-century Romanian Jewry
- Aharon Appelfeld (1932–2018), novelist and Holocaust survivor
- Moshe Arad (1934–2019), Israeli diplomat
- Uzi Arad (b. 1947), strategist in foreign policy and security
- Yardena Arazi (b. 1951), singer and entertainer
- Shari Arison (b. 1957), American-born businesswoman and philanthropist, Israel's wealthiest woman
- Ted Arison (1924–1999), founder of Carnival Cruise Lines
- Shlomo Artzi (b. 1949), singer-songwriter
- Asaf Avidan (b. 1980), singer-songwriter and musician
- Colette Avital (b. 1940), diplomat and politician
- Haim Aviv (b. 1940), molecular biologist
- Élie Barnavi (b. 1946), historian and diplomat
- Miki Berkovich (b. 1954), professional basketball player
- Herman Berkovits (b. 1947), the personal physician of Benjamin Netanyahu
- Michaela Bercu (b. 1967), model and actress
- Steve Bond (b. 1953), Israeli-American television actor and model
- Rozina Cambos (1951–2012), actress
- Yigal Carmon (b. 1946), intelligence officer, counter-terrorism adviser, Middle East analyst
- Adrian Dvir, computer scientist and author
- Gilad Erdan (b. 1979), politician, member of the Knesset for Likud and the Minister of Public Security, Strategic Affairs and Minister of Information
- Miriam Eshkol (1929–2016), wife of Israeli Prime Minister Levi Eshkol
- Miriam Feirberg (b. 1951), mayor of Netanya, a city in the Centre District of Israel
- Mei Finegold (b. 1982), singer
- Benny Gantz (b. 1959), Army general and politician
- Oded Gavish (b. 1979), professional football player
- Yael German (b. 1947), politician who currently serves as a member of the Knesset for Yesh Atid
- Dan Goldstein (b. 1954), pioneer of the Israeli software industry
- Amos Guttman (1954–1993), film director
- Zvika Hadar (b. 1966), actor, comedian and television host
- Esther Hayut (b. 1953), Chief Justice of the Supreme Court of Israel
- Gabriel Herman, professor specialised in ancient Greek social history
- Eliahu Itzkovitz, notable for executing the concentration camp guard who had killed his family
- Marcel Janco (1895–1984), visual artist, architect and art theorist
- Moshe Idel (b.1947), historian and philosopher of Jewish mysticism
- Yisrael Katz (b. 1955), Likud politician
- Avi Kornick (b. 1983), actor
- Yair Lapid (b. 1963), journalist and politician, former Prime Minister of Israel (July-December 2022)
- Shimon Lev-Ari (1942–2012), actor, translator and archivist
- Adi Lev (1953–2006), actress
- Yonit Levi (b. 1977), television presenter and journalist
- Gita Luka (1921–2001), actress, singer and entertainer
- Sarah Marom-Shalev (b. 1934), politician
- Moshe, Mordechai and Menachem Meir, brothers and businessmen who built the Shalom Meir Tower in Tel Aviv
- Rina Mor (b. 1956), lawyer, writer and beauty queen who won Miss Universe 1976
- Tali Moreno (b. 1981), news anchor and reporter
- Michael Moshonov (b. 1986), actor, singer, musician and TV host
- Meir Nitzan (b. 1931), politician, long-time mayor of Rishon Lezion
- Eyal Ofer (b. 1950), real estate and shipping magnate
- Idan Ofer (b. 1955), business magnate and philanthropist
- Sammy Ofer (1922–2011), shipping magnate and philanthropist
- Yuli Ofer (1924–2011), businessman in real estate and industry
- Keren Peles (b. 1979), singer-songwriter and pianist
- Natalie Portman (b. 1981), actress, producer and director
- Eyal Ran (b. 1972), tennis player and Captain of the Israel Davis Cup team
- Zeev Rosenstein, drug dealer
- Karol Rotner, professional football player
- Reuven Rubin (1893–1974), painter and diplomat
- Edmond Schmilovich, football coach
- Dudi Sela (b. 1985), professional tennis player
- Itay Shechter (b. 1987), professional football player
- Eliyahu Tamler (1919–1948), Irgun commander
- Ada Valerie-Tal (1936–1994), actress
- Idan Vered (b. 1989), professional football player
- Dov Zeltzer (b. 1932), composer and conductor
- Margalit Zimmerman and Lily Zimmerman, sisters, both married at some point to Israeli Prime Minister Ariel Sharon
- Yisrael Zinger (b. 1948), politician and current mayor of Ramat Gan
