= Jewish emigration from Romania =

Emigration of Romania's historic Jewish community to Israel

The emigration of Jews from Romania refers to the historic migration (aliyah) of Romanian Jews to the Land or State of Israel.

== Early period ==
The aliyah (immigration of the Jewish diaspora to the so-called "Land of Israel") of Jews from Romania has been recorded since the 18th century, when the Chief Rabbi of Bukovina emigrated to the city of Safed. Later, in the 19th century, representatives of several Jewish organizations that had been established earlier in Romania held in the city of Focșani the first Zionist (of Zionism, a Jewish movement that advocated for a Jewish state in the Middle East) conference in history in December 1881. After the conference, many Jews emigrated in caravans to modern-day Israel, establishing various settlements such as Rosh Pinna and Zikhron Ya'akov once they arrived. Romanian Jews from Bârlad and Moinești constituted an important part of the so-called First Aliyah in 1882.

== Interwar period and Second World War ==
During the interwar period and the early times of the Second World War, in Romania, many Jews were able to emigrate without restrictions as the Romanian governments of the time wanted to reduce the country's Jewish population. By this time, Romania's Jewish population was remarkably sizeable, about 756,930 people in 1930. These constituted large percentages of the population in some regions, such as Western Moldavia (6.5%), Bessarabia (7.2%, with many still speaking Yiddish), Transylvania (10%) and Bukovina (10.8%). In 1940, when the National Legionary State was established, many Jews asked the state to support their emigration, which was accepted. Subsequently, Ion Antonescu, ruler of Romania, issued a draft order to establish a government directorate for the subject of Jewish emigration, which could never be carried out due to the Legionnaires' rebellion of 1941.

Despite this, during the war, many Jews were killed in Romania during the Holocaust. In 1941, the Jewish population was reduced to just 375,422 people, this number being of 295,084 in 1942 and of 355,972 in 1945 (after some territorial changes). An estimated 270,000 Jews were murdered in the Holocaust in Romania, not counting the ones that died during the Romanian administration of Transnistria or the 135,000 killed in Hungary in Northern Transylvania (which is now part of Romania). After the war, around 300,000 Jews in Romania remained, making it the country the largest with a Jewish population in the region. Many of the survivors decided to emigrate after seeing that a communist regime would be established in Romania.

== Communist period ==
After 1945, a global emigration of Jews to modern-day Israel began. Romania was seen by various Jewish political figures as an important source of Jews, so many of them visited the country to discuss the issue. By 1947, Romania's Jewish population was estimated to be 457,000, an increase due to Jewish survivors of German, Hungarian and Romanian Transnistrian camps, as well as the arrival of refugees from Northern Bukovina, Bessarabia (lands that Romania lost after the war) and Poland and natural population growth. Of these, some 40,000 Romanian Jews emigrated to Palestine in 1947. The next year, the State of Israel was formed, and Romania recognized it on 11 June 1948 under the initiative of Ana Pauker. For the rest of the century, Romania would be the only communist state that maintained uninterrupted relations with Israel.

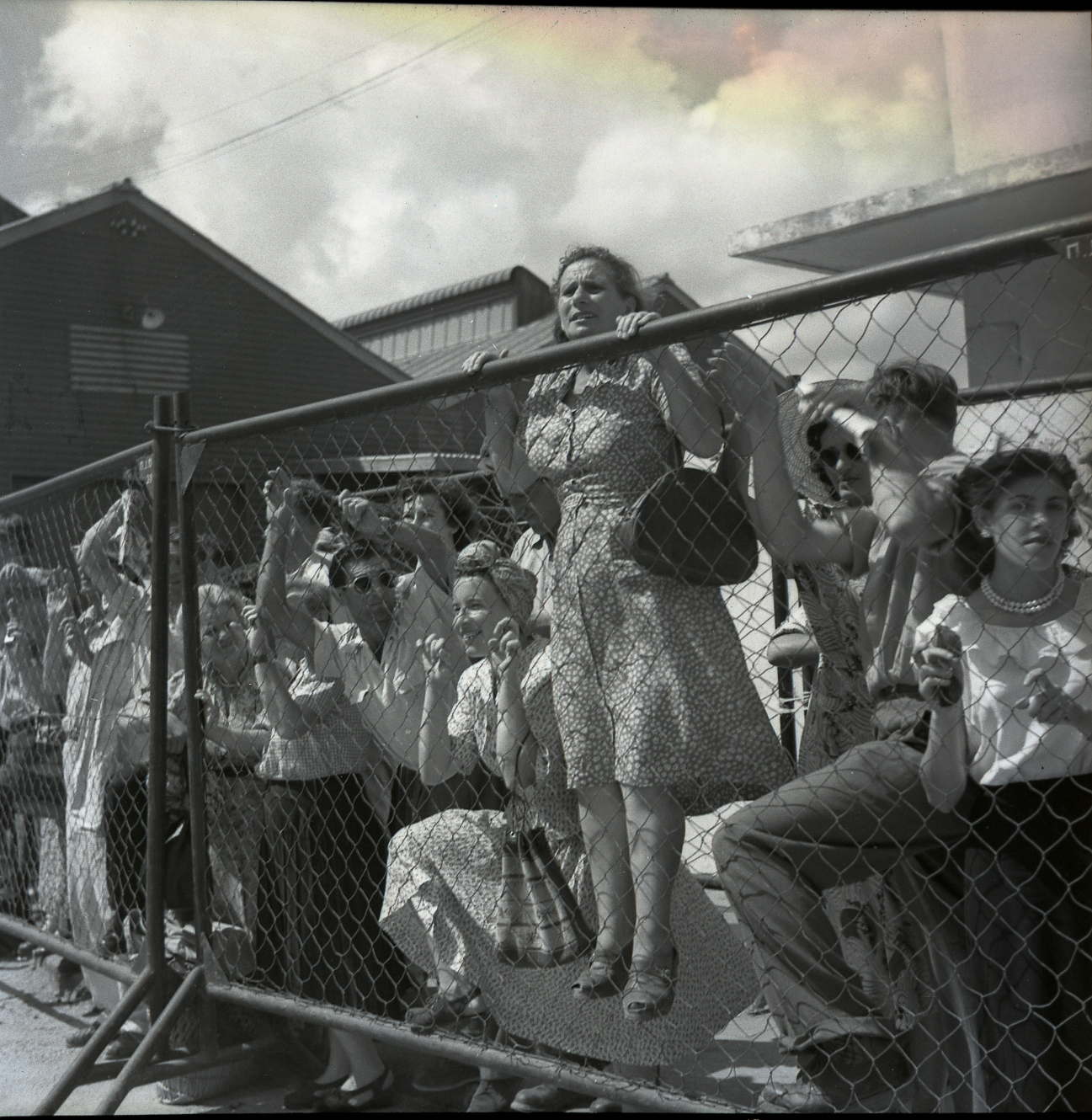
Olim from Romania in the port of Haifa, 1951

According to the Jewish Agency, in 1949, 118,939 Romanian Jews had emigrated to Israel since the war ended. During the following years would begin the nationalization of the industrial sector, leaving around 140,000 Jews without any source of income, which increased the desire for aliyah among them. The period between 1952 and 1957 was the most restrictive towards the Jews in Romania, as the leaders of the Zionist movement in the country were imprisoned. This is probably because Jewish emigration started to affect the Romanian economy. Nevertheless, the Romanian Communist Party (PCR) began to pressure the Jews to make aliyah during this period, most likely due to the secret intention of reducing the national Jewish population.

During the following periods, between 1958 and 1966, aliyah started to be performed again by Jews, with an average of 14,000 Jews leaving the country per year. During 1967 and 1968, this number dropped to 550, increasing to 3,000 between 1969 and 1974 and dropping again to 1,500 between 1975 and 1989 (year in which the communism ended in the country). Between 1991 and 1994, the average number of Jews leaving Romania was 500.

Romanian Jews were, under their own will, "sold" or "exchanged" to Israel in the 1950s with the help of the American Jewish Joint Distribution Committee for about 8,000 lei (about 420 dollars). The price of these Jews usually varied according to their "worth". This practice continued at a slower pace from 1965 under Nicolae Ceaușescu, a Romanian communist leader. During the 1950s, West Germany had been also paying Romania an amount of money in exchange for some Germans of Romania, and, just like the Jews (both of which were regarded as "co-nationals"), their price was "calculated". Ceaușescu, happy with these policies, even declared that "oil, Germans, and Jews are our most important export commodities".

The Israeli government paid to allow Romanian Jews to emigrate, and around 235,000 people made aliyah under this conditions. When Romania was under control of Gheorghe Gheorghiu-Dej, he received 10 million dollars per year, and only he had the access to the money transferred to the secret account. Israel also bought Romanian goods and invested into Romania's economy. After his death, Ceauşescu practically sold the Jews to Israel, and received between 4,000 and 6,000 $ per person. Israel could have transferred nearly 60 million dollars for the aliyah. Another estimation is higher - according to Radu Ioanid, "Ceausescu sold 40,577 Jews to Israel for $112,498,800, at a price of $2,500 and later at $3,300 per head."

== Modern period ==
Due to the Jewish emigration from Romania, the country's Jewish population has been greatly reduced. In the 2011 census, less than 4,000 persons declared to be Jewish. However, in the 2010s, an estimated 8,000 remained in the country (with some 3,000 in Bucharest), although the highest estimates consisted of about 12,000. There have been some cases of Romanian-Jewish families returning from Israel to Romania in the hope that with the country's accession to the European Union and NATO, the situation would have improved. Nowadays, antisemitism in Romania is still present and, just like in many other European countries, it has undergone an increase in recent years.

== See also ==
- German exodus from the Socialist Republic of Romania
- Israel–Romania relations
- Romanian Jews in Israel
- History of the Jews in Romania
