= Charles Thau =

Polish-born Red Army soldier (1921–1995)

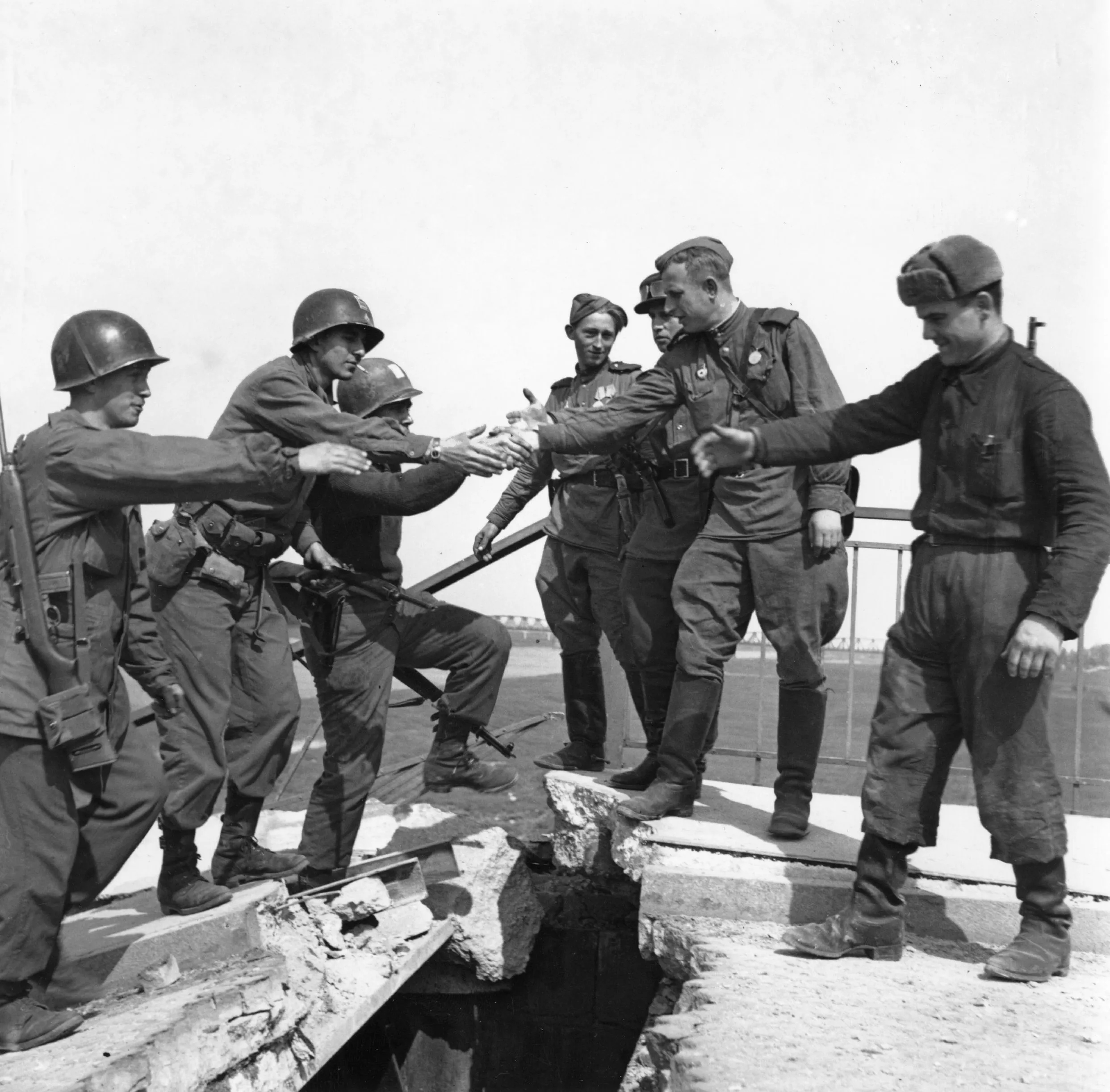
- Chaim (Charles) Thau (center) during the staged Elbe link-up photograph, 26 April 1945
- Born: Chaim Thau; 7 July 1921; Zabłotów, Poland
- Died: 2 April 1995 (aged 73); Milwaukee, Wisconsin, U.S.
- Military career
- Allegiance: Soviet Union
- Branch: Red Army
- Service years: 1942–1945
- Rank: Lieutenant
- Units: 56th Guards Rifle Regiment, 58th Guards Rifle Division
- Conflicts: World War II; Battle of Berlin; Israeli War of Independence
- Awards: Medal "For Courage"; Medal "For Battle Merit"
- Other work: Resistance activities; Bricha operative; US businessman

Charles Thau (born Chaim Thau; 7 July 1921 – 2 April 1995) was a Polish-born Jewish resistance member and Red Army soldier during World War II, who later participated in the Israeli War of Independence. He served in the Red Army as a translator and later as a front-line soldier and was photographed at the American-Soviet link-up at Torgau in April 1945, an event commemorated annually as Elbe Day.

Born in Zabłotów, Poland, Thau survived the Holocaust by fleeing into the Carpathian forests after the Nazi Germany invasion of the Soviet Union in 1941. Thau engaged in partisan resistance before later serving in the Red Army where he was wounded multiple times in combat, including during the Battle of Berlin, and received the Medal "For Courage".

After the war, Thau was active in the Bricha movement in Austria, assisting Jewish displaced persons seeking to leave Europe. In 1948, he participated in the Israeli War of Independence. He subsequently resided in Israel for approximately two years before immigrating to the United States in 1951. He settled in Milwaukee, Wisconsin, where he raised a family, became a businessman, and owned several automobile repair garages.

His appearance in the widely reproduced 1945 photograph provides a visual link between his experience as a Jewish survivor and Soviet soldier and the Allied-Soviet cooperation at the close of World War II.

== Early life and education ==
Born Chaim Thau on 7 July 1921 in the shtetl of Zabłotów (present-day Zabolotiv, Ukraine) in eastern Poland, he grew up in an agrarian Jewish family. His father, Mordechai, was a merchant peddler operating from the family farm, while his mother, Esther, taught Yiddish, German, and Polish from their home, which also functioned as a small classroom. He had two younger brothers.

Zabłotów was a market town with roughly equal Jewish and Christian populations. Archival tax records place the Thau family among the more highly assessed households. In this multilingual environment, he became proficient in several languages. (Note: During the interwar years, Zabłotów's Tuesday markets connected surrounding agrarian communities with Jewish merchants and craftsmen. The town's population was multilingual, speaking Polish, Yiddish, Ukrainian, and German, reflecting the region’s diverse demographics.)

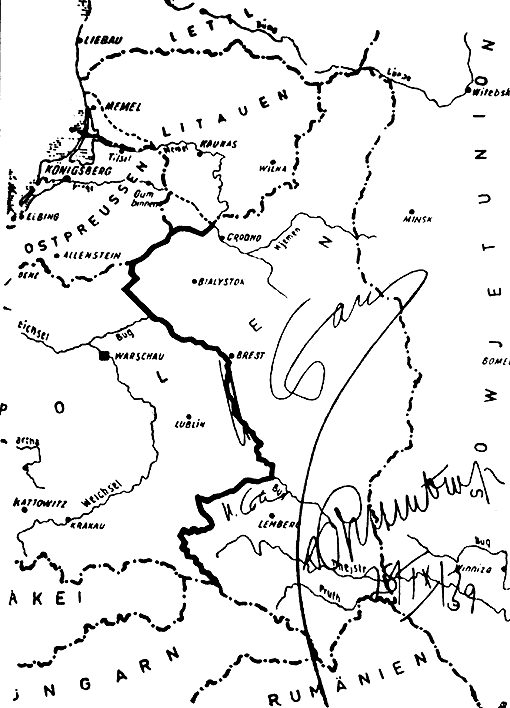
The German–Soviet boundary in occupied Poland, established by the German–Soviet Boundary and Friendship Treaty of 28 September 1939; the map bears the signatures of Joseph Stalin and Joachim von Ribbentrop. Zablotow (Thau's village) was located north of the Romanian border, on the river labeled Pruth, slightly under the letter R in Ribbentrop's signature above.

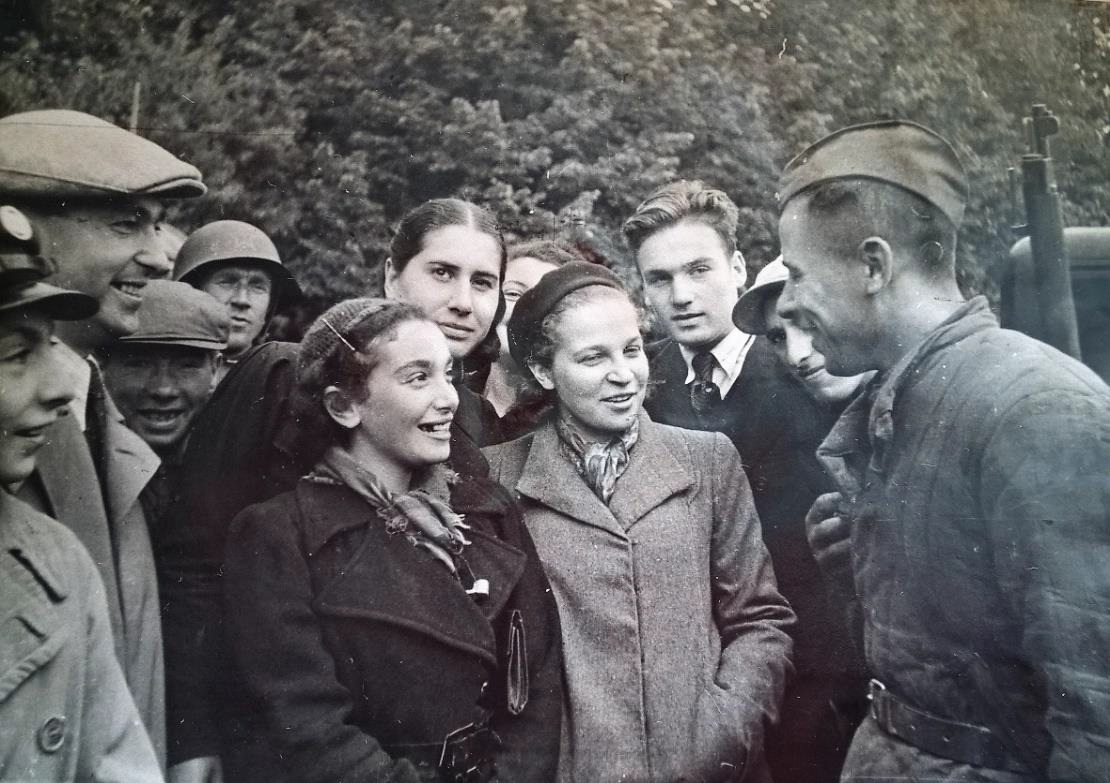
Residents speak with a Red Army soldier, 1939

On 23 August 1939, Nazi Germany and the Soviet Union signed the Molotov–Ribbentrop Pact, whose secret protocol defined their respective spheres of interest in Eastern Europe. Germany invaded Poland on 1 September, followed by the Soviet invasion from the east on 17 September. On 28 September, Germany and the Soviet Union signed the German–Soviet Boundary and Friendship Treaty, establishing a revised boundary through occupied Polish territory. Zabłotów fell within the Soviet zone.

The Soviet occupation brought changes to local administration, education, and public life. Russian was subsequently mandated as the language of instruction in local schools. With Soviet soldiers stationed in Zabłotów and through his interactions with them, Thau learned Russian, adding it to his existing knowledge of Polish, German, Yiddish, and Hebrew.

Contemporary accounts indicate that some residents initially welcomed the Soviets and perceived their presence as protective, but the region was soon incorporated into the Soviet system.

This environment of cultural diversity and relative stability would be abruptly shattered with the German invasion in 1941.

== Nazi invasion and persecution ==
In June 1941, Nazi Germany violated the Molotov–Ribbentrop Pact by invading the Soviet Union in Operation Barbarossa. German and Hungarian forces occupied Zabłotów in early July 1941. (Note: Following the Soviet retreat, Zabłotów fell within the Hungarian occupation zone administered by the Hungarian Carpathian Group (Kárpát Csoport). German security elements, including personnel from Einsatzgruppe, operated in the area shortly thereafter.)

Persecution of the Jewish population intensified thereafter. In the latter half of 1941, German security forces and local collaborators helped carry out mass shootings as part of Einsatzgruppen operations. By the end of the year, approximately 1,100 of the town's roughly 2,700 Jewish residents had been killed.

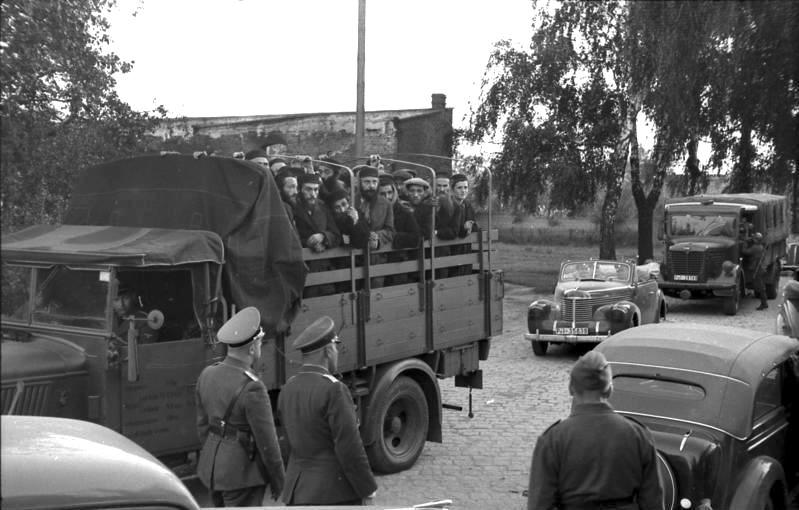
Jews transported, 1941–1942, Zabłotów area

Most of the remaining Jewish residents were subsequently deported to extermination camps. Thau's parents and two younger brothers—Mordechai, Esther, Barrish, and Hershel—did not survive.

== Hiding and partisan activity ==
With the destruction of his community underway, Thau's flight into the forests marked the beginning of a prolonged struggle for survival. His survival represents an anomaly in the broader history of the Holocaust, as only a small fraction of Jewish citizens in the region successfully escaped into the forests or integrated into active partisan formations.

In the forests, the ability to survive involved foraging, acquiring food from nearby farms, and using concealed dugouts (Zemlyanka) to endure winter conditions and avoid detection.

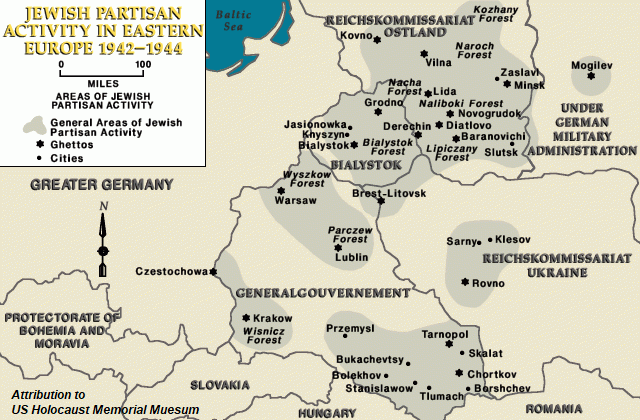
Thau survived in forested areas near the Romanian border

Thau later linked up with a childhood friend, another Jewish survivor, and the two operated together near the Romanian border.

According to Der Spiegel (2025) and The Forward (2025), Thau at times disguised himself as a Wehrmacht officer, using his fluency in German and procured uniforms to enter nearby towns in order to obtain food and medical care. Similar use of disguise has been documented among other partisan groups in comparable conditions.

== Red Army service ==
Thau spent approximately 19 months hiding in the forests. He was discovered by Soviet-aligned combatants operating behind German lines, and was initially suspected of being a Nazi collaborator or Wehrmacht deserter, reflecting broader Red Army suspicion of civilians emerging from occupied territories. His fluency in German contributed to this suspicion. After demonstrating Russian proficiency as well, the suspicions were eased. Archival Red Army records indicate Thau was conscripted into the Red Army by the Strupinetsky District Military Commissariat of Stanislav Oblast. (Note: Conscription date discrepancy: Russian archival documentation records that Thau was "conscripted" (призван) on 10 July 1942 by the Strupinetsky District Military Commissariat of Stanislav Oblast. However, regular Red Army forces did not liberate the Zabolotiv area until 30 March 1944. According to Thau's longstanding family accounts, he spent approximately 19 months in hiding in the forests before linking up with Soviet-aligned combatants behind enemy lines. It remains unresolved how the 10 July 1942 entry relates to Thau’s reported contact with Soviet-aligned combatants behind German lines or whether it was recorded retrospectively by Soviet military authorities.) His language skills were subsequently used for military interrogations and liaison duties.

During the Red Army's westward advance in 1944 and 1945, archival records identify Thau as a Guards sergeant serving as a rifleman in the 56th Guards Rifle Regiment of the 58th Guards Rifle Division. (Note: An archival cover letter incorrectly identifies Thau as having served in the 19th Guards Rifle Division. However, the contemporaneous regimental award order (No. 01) and accompanying service records identify him as a Guards sergeant in the 56th Guards Rifle Regiment of the 58th Guards Rifle Division.)

On 15 January 1945, Thau was wounded during offensive operations in Poland near a position identified in Soviet records as "Height 55.2." (Note: The location identified in Soviet records as "Height 55.2" corresponds to a numbered elevation used for tactical reference on Red Army operational maps. Combat accounts of the 58th Guards Rifle Division (part of the 5th Guards Army) place the unit in mid-January 1945 in the Stopnica–Nida River sector during the opening phase of the Sandomierz–Silesian Offensive. Contemporary military analyses describe this phase as characterized by heavily fortified German positions on elevated terrain that were reduced through concentrated artillery and infantry assaults. See also: D. Sims and A. Schilling, "Breakout from the Sandomierz Bridgehead," Field Artillery (October 1990), pp. 20–24; V. N. Kiselyov, "Sandomirsko-Silezskaya operatsiya 1945," in S. Ivanov (ed.), Voyennyy entsiklopediya, vol. 7 (Moscow: Voenizdat, 2003), pp. 373–374.)

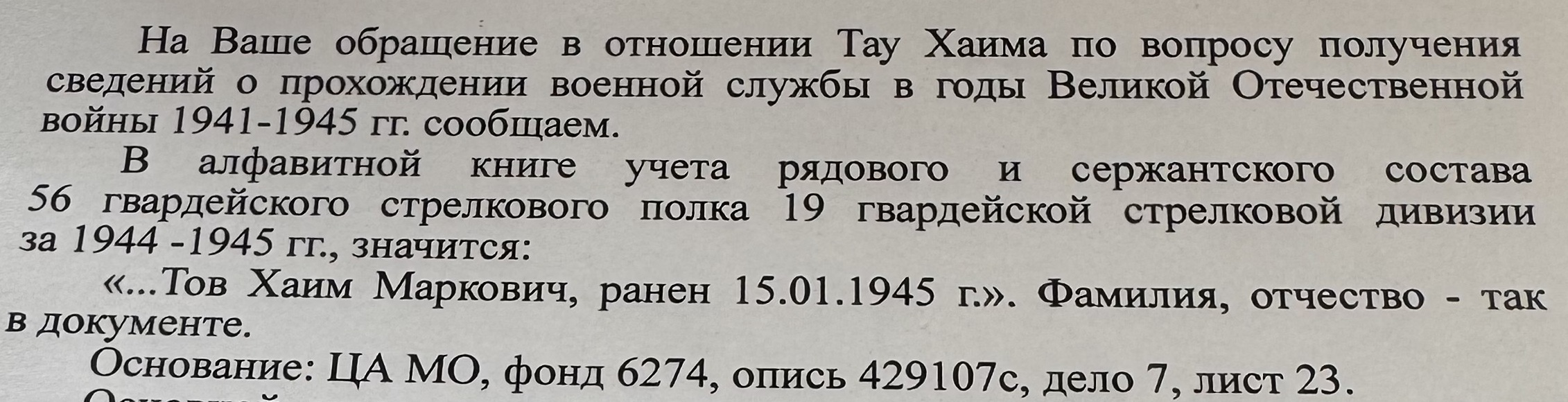
Russian archival letter indicating Thau was wounded on 15 Jan 1945

According to the regimental award citation, after another machine-gun crew was taken out of action by enemy fire, Thau assumed operation of their heavy mounted weapon and opened sustained defensive counter fire against advancing German infantry, thereby enabling the continued advance of Soviet infantry. He was awarded the Medal "For Courage" by regimental order dated 20 January 1945.

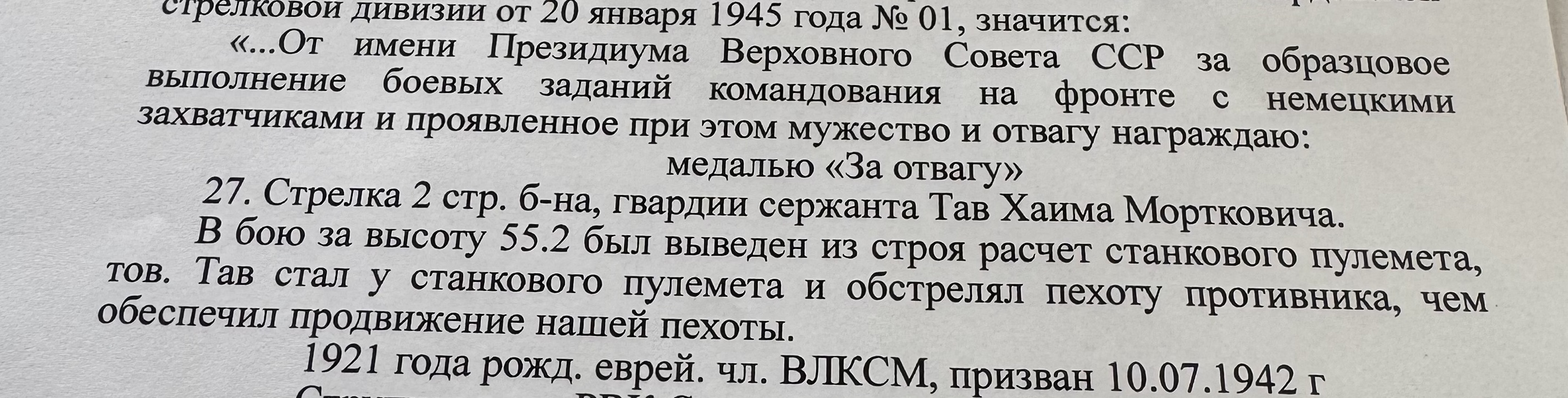
Russian archival excerpt documenting Thau’s Medal ‘For Bravery’ award

Less than a month later, Soviet medical records identify Thau as a crew commander in the 56th Guards Rifle Regiment. On 9 February 1945, he sustained a through-and-through gunshot wound to the right iliac region and was medically evacuated. He returned to frontline service 20 February 1945.

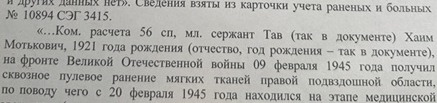
Russian medical archival extract – Thau was wounded on 9 February 1945 in the right abdomen evidenced by a pass-through gunshot, then released less than two weeks later back to front lines.

As casualties among junior officers mounted, experienced enlisted soldiers were promoted. In this context, and for Thau specifically, a later account states that Thau was promoted in the field to lieutenant and assumed command of an anti-tank battery equipped with 76 mm divisional guns within the 58th Guards Rifle Division.

In April 1945, his division reached the Elbe River and took part in the Allied–Soviet link-up at Torgau before advancing toward Berlin. He was later wounded during street fighting in the Battle of Berlin. A bullet fragment remained lodged in his cheek until it was discovered and removed by a dentist in Milwaukee in 1951.

== Elbe link-up (April 1945) ==
By April 1945, Allied operational plans called for US forces advancing eastward to halt along the Elbe–Mulde line in preparation for contact with advancing Soviet formations, culminating in the link-up commemorated annually as Elbe Day. The meeting between elements of the 58th Guards Rifle Division and the US 69th Infantry Division was one of several contacts establishing the Allied–Soviet link-up in central Germany.

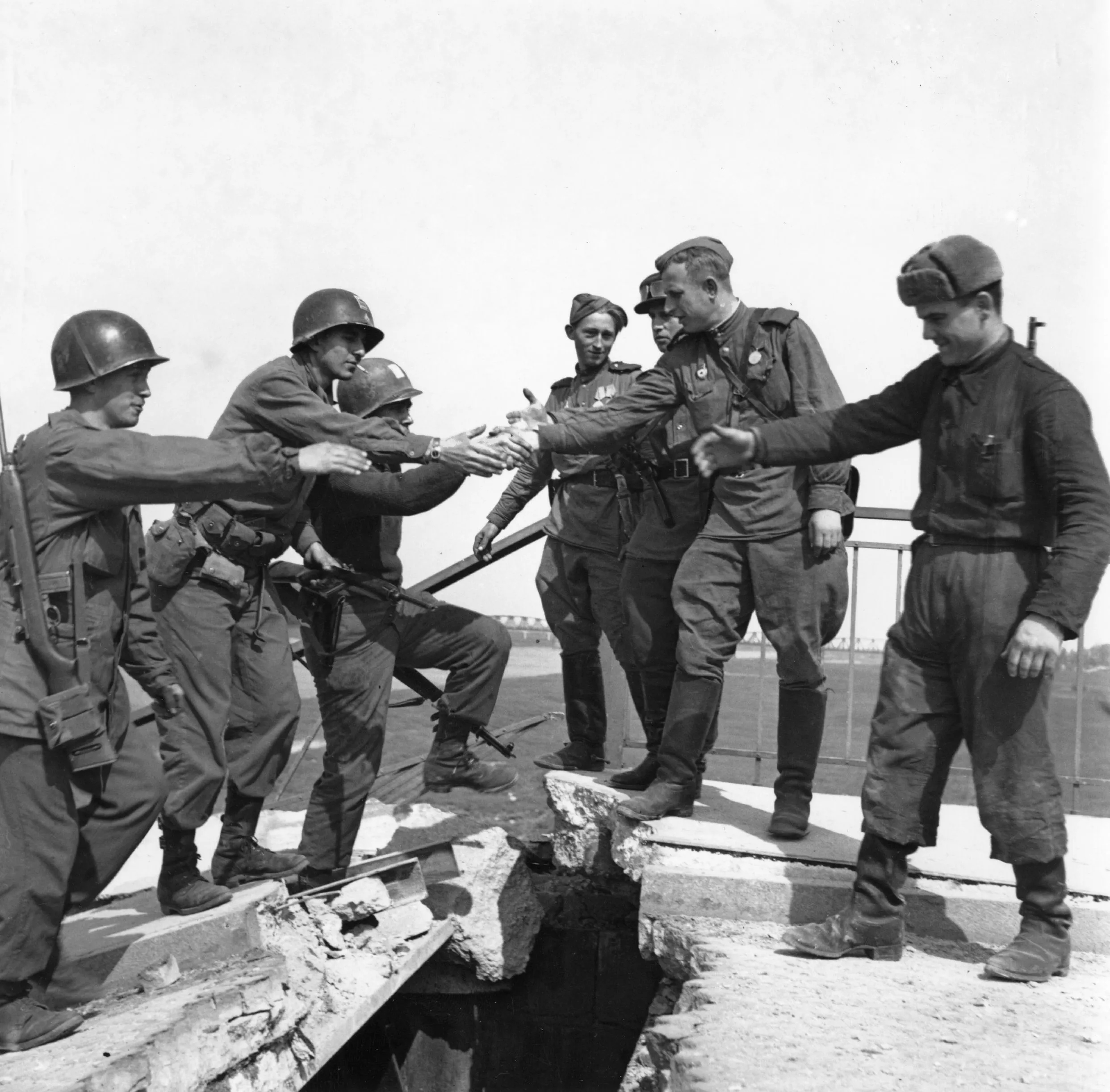
Thau (center) behind the handshake, staged 26 April 1945

Thau appears in the reproduced photograph of the Allied–Soviet link-up, positioned at the center behind the handshake, looking directly into the camera. (Note: The photograph was taken during a formal, press-arranged meeting staged for photographers after the initial contact between US and Soviet patrols earlier on 25 April 1945.) In the image, Thau is depicted wearing a standard Red Army field uniform (gymnastyorka Model 1943) with a sidearm carried in a belt holster. He is also shown wearing Soviet military decorations, including the Medal "For Courage" and the Medal "For Battle Merit". High-resolution reproductions show wound stripes (ranenie stripes) on his right chest, indicating injuries sustained prior to late April 1945. (Note: Decree of the Presidium of the Supreme Soviet of the USSR No. 213 (14 July 1942): "On the establishment of insignia for military personnel of the Red Army wounded in battles.") (Note: The stripes are distinct from the wound he received during the subsequent Battle of Berlin.)

Film from the camera was transmitted to the Associated Press, and was subsequently distributed and reproduced as headlines in newspapers. Later research on the event led to the correction of a long-standing misidentification of one of the American soldiers in the photograph.

== Postwar activities ==
After World War II, Thau returned to Zabłotów to search for his relatives. Finding no survivors among his immediate or extended family, he departed the region and relocated to Salzburg, Austria within the American occupation zone. There, he worked as an automobile mechanic while becoming an active operative in the clandestine Bricha network—an underground effort that facilitated the transit of Jewish Holocaust survivors out of post-war Europe.

=== Bricha operative ===
Operating from the Salzburg region, including the displaced-persons camp at Saalfelden, Thau was involved in logistical operations supporting the movement of Jewish refugees across postwar Europe despite British immigration restrictions. His multilingual fluency and familiarity with regional geography significantly enhanced the efficacy of these clandestine transit routes despite restrictive British immigration policies.

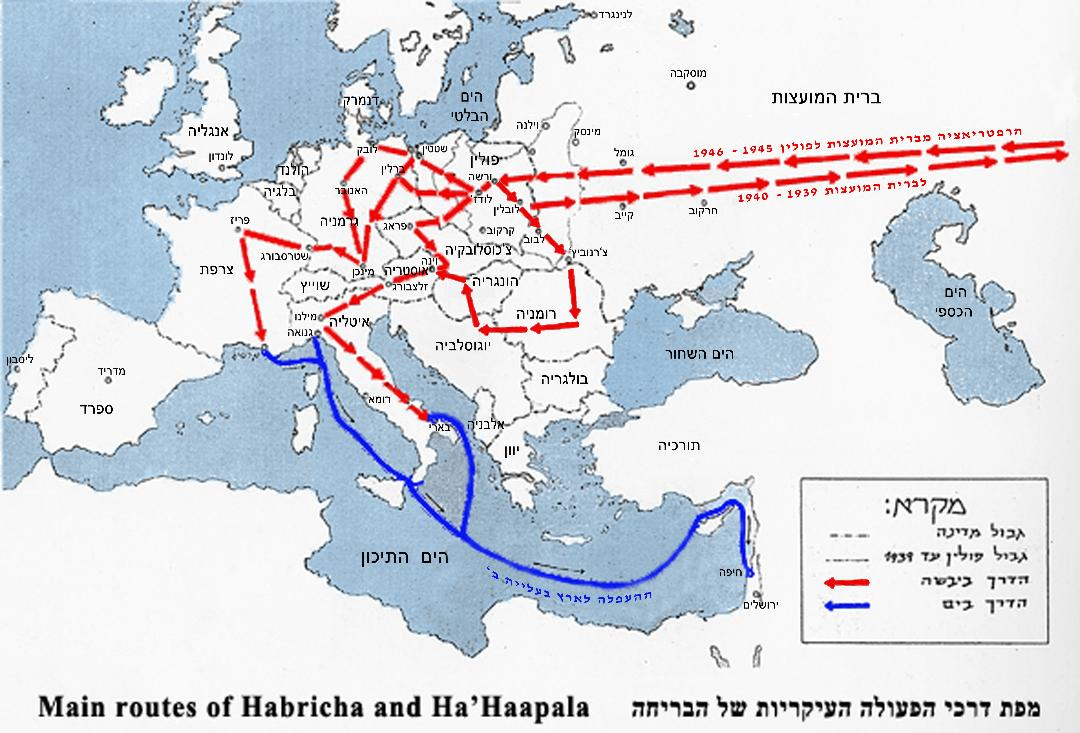
Thau supported routes from Austria over the Alps to Mediterranean ports, 1946–1947

Bricha operations in Austria were closely connected to the displaced-persons camp system established by Allied authorities, which concentrated large numbers of Jewish survivors in the American occupation zone. Camps in the Salzburg region, including Camp Saalfelden, functioned as staging centers where refugee groups were assembled, transportation arranged, and documentation prepared for movement across Alpine transit corridors into Italy and onward to Mediterranean ports.

Bricha unit at Camp Saalfelden, Austria, c. 1947–1948. See top row, third from right labeled “Chaim”

A contemporary photo collage from the late 1940s identifies Thau within the dedicated Bricha unit at Camp Saalfelden.

In 1948, following the dissolution of the Bricha network, Thau participated in the Israeli War of Independence. He subsequently remained in Israel for approximately two years before a Jewish immigration agency sponsored his move to the United States in 1951.

=== Immigration ===
As Thau recalled what soldiers of the 69th Infantry Division had told him at the Elbe link-up about life in America, Thau sought help to immigrate to the USA from the American Jewish Joint Distribution Committee back at Camp Saalfelden. They assisted him in securing a sponsor, as prospective immigrants were required to have one. Attorney David Rabinowitz of Sheboygan, Wisconsin was identified as his sponsor.

Thau arrived in New York on 7 September 1951 aboard the USS General M. B. Stewart, then traveled to Sheboygan and later settled in Milwaukee.

== Business career ==
After years shaped by war and displacement, Thau established a stable civilian life resettling in Milwaukee. Thau anglicized his name to Charles Thau and resumed work as an auto mechanic, a trade he had practiced in postwar Salzburg.

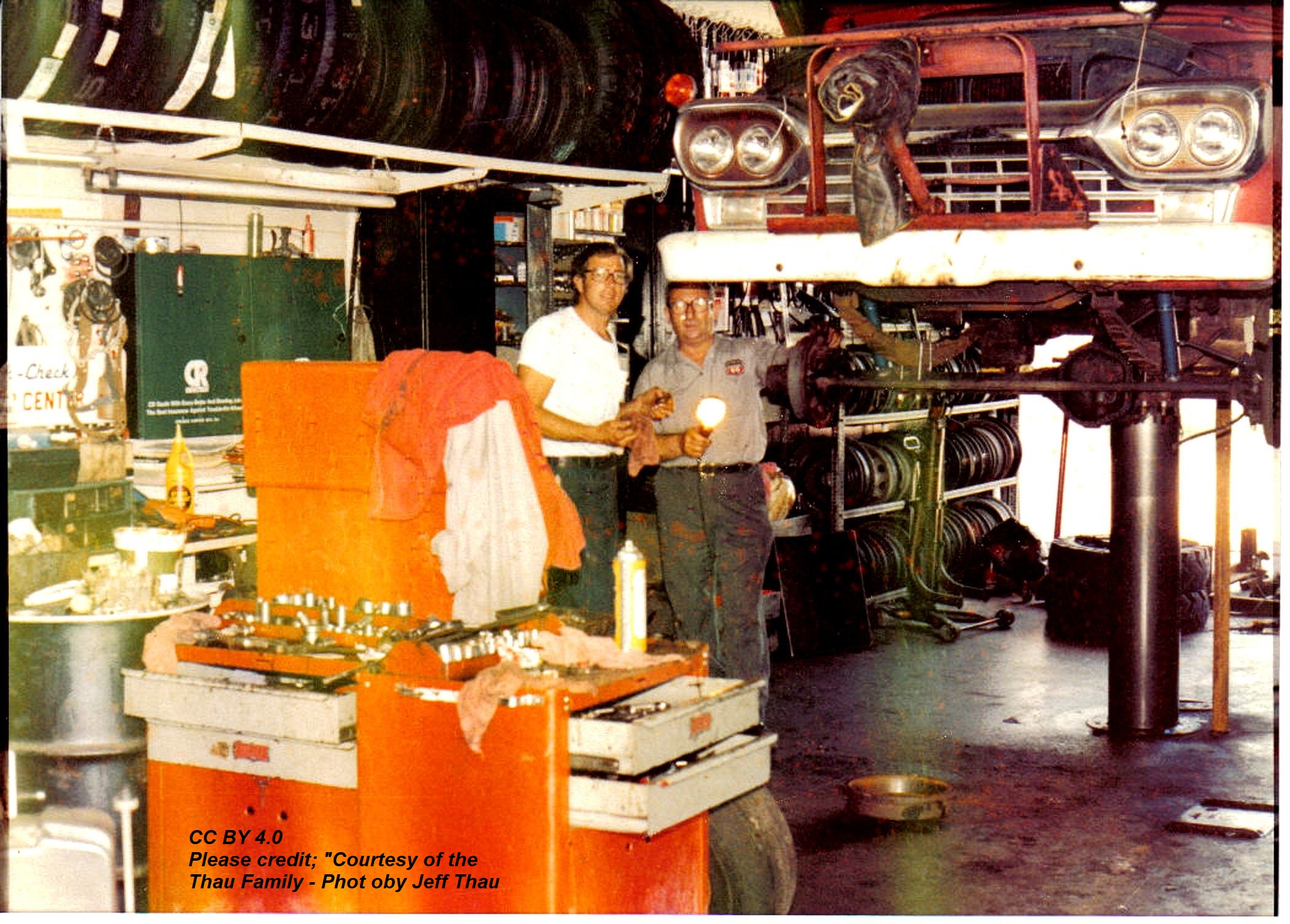
Thau (right) with assistant Glenn Retzlaff in the garage, c. late 1960s

From the early 1950s to the 1990s, he owned and operated multiple service stations, including several Phillips 66–branded locations in Milwaukee. (Note: The earliest site of Thau's garage was located at 59th and Lisbon)

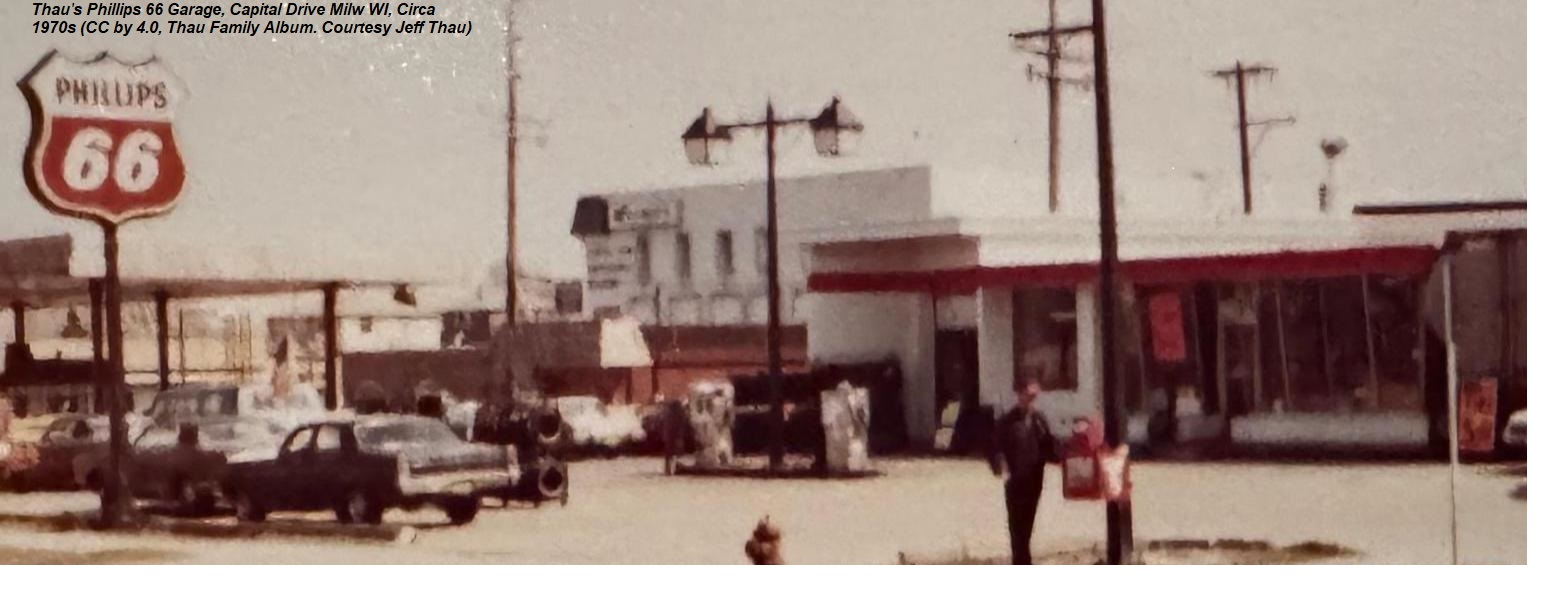
Thau's Phillips 66 Garage on Capital Drive, c. 1970s

Independent records from the early 1960s list his business at 433 South 6th Street. He later operated additional locations on West Greenfield Avenue and on Capital Drive.

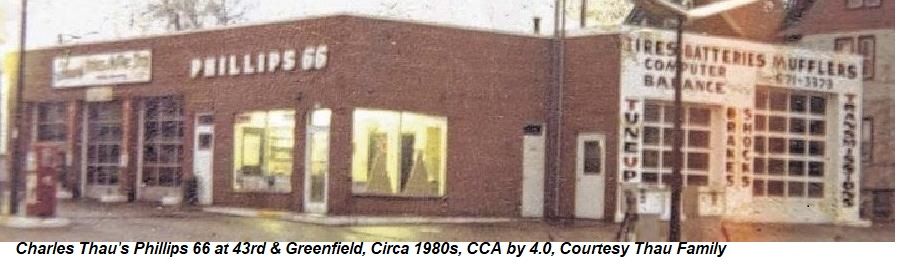
Thau's Brake & Muffler Shop at 43rd and Greenfield, c. 1980s

Thau used his multilingual abilities in Polish, Russian, Yiddish, German, and English to assist newly arrived immigrants from Europe. His garages served as gathering places for Milwaukee's postwar Jewish and European community, where he helped with translations, employment referrals, and introductions. As Thau's multiple Phillips 66 service stations grew across Milwaukee over several decades, he became an established local businessman. During this period Thau remained personally involved in daily operations and maintained close ties with his family and community.

== Personal life ==
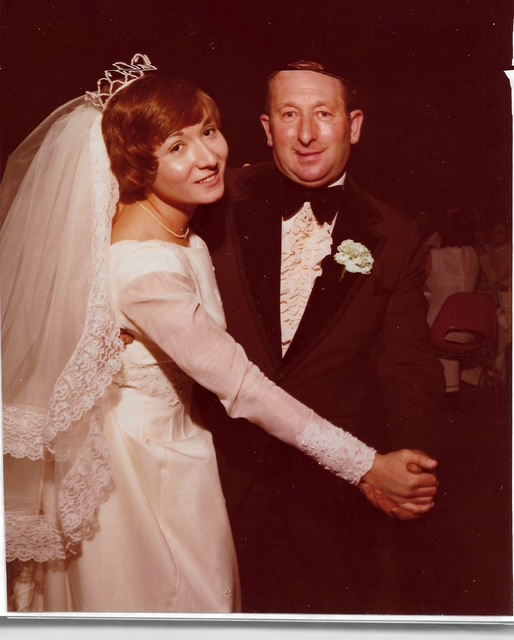
Thau and daughter Esther at her wedding, June 1975

Thau married Ida, a first generation American of Russian descent, and they had three children: Martin, Jeffrey, and Esther.

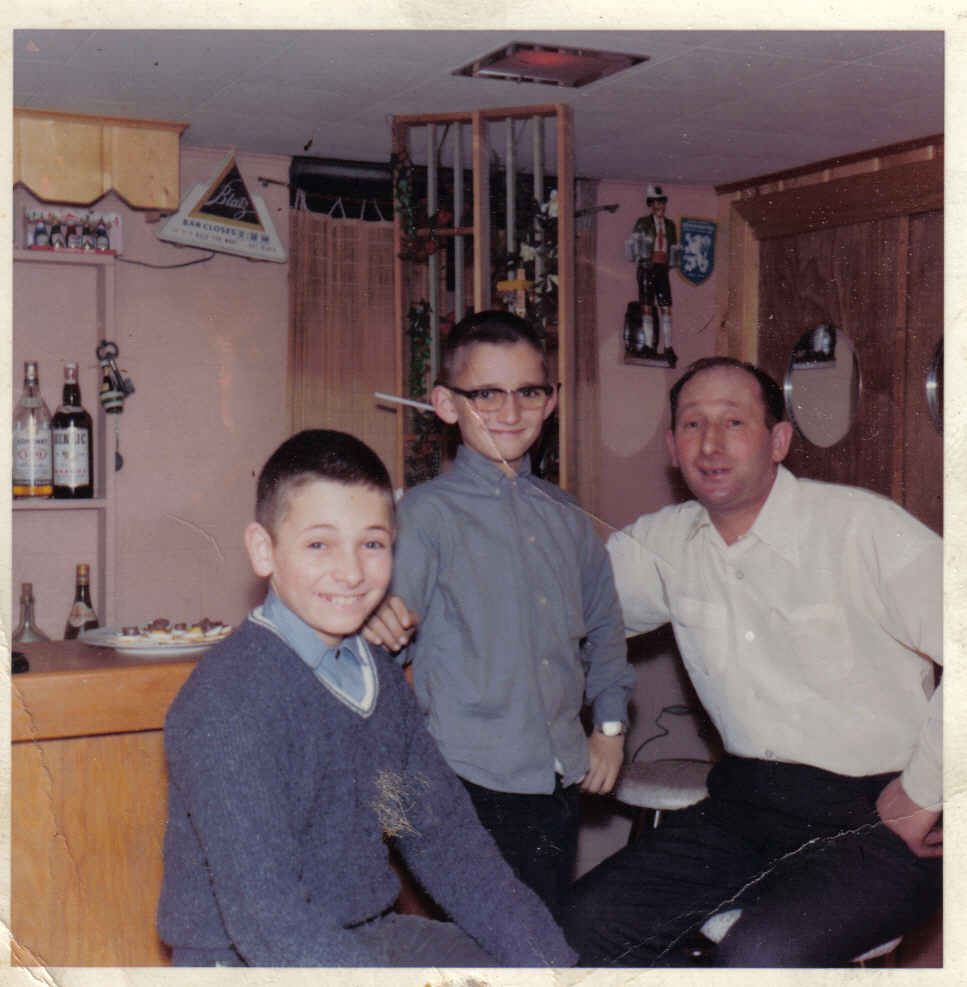
Thau (right) with his sons Jeff (center) and Martin (left), March 1965

In 1951, during a routine dental X-ray in Milwaukee, a bullet fragment from his wartime injury in Berlin was discovered still lodged in his jaw and was surgically removed.

Photographs from the 1960s and 1970s document his family life during the period he operated his businesses in Milwaukee. Charles Thau died on 2 April 1995, several weeks before the 50th anniversary of Elbe Day.

== Legacy ==
Thau's life encompassed Holocaust survival, Jewish partisan resistance, decorated Red Army service, postwar Bricha activities, and eventual resettlement and business life in the United States. His wartime experiences were documented in a 1955 interview with the Milwaukee Journal.

His appearance in Allan Jackson's widely reproduced photograph of the American-Soviet link-up at Torgau provides a lasting visual record of his wartime service. The photograph became an enduring symbol of cooperation between American and Soviet forces in the final weeks of World War II. Thau is noted by the city of Torgau each Elbe Day, along with other known soldiers in the photo.

Since his passing, Thau’s youngest son, USAF Colonel Jeff Thau, has represented his father at Torgau’s Elbe Day ceremonies. A bas-relief at the National World War II Memorial in Washington, D.C. depicts the linkup.

As later historical accounts noted, the photograph also came to hold particular significance in narratives of Jewish survival on both sides of the bridge. That is, in a striking convergence of circumstance, Thau, a Jewish survivor serving with the Red Army, appears at one end of the bridge, while American 69th Infantry Technician Fifth Grade (T/5) Bernard E. Kirschenbaum, also Jewish, appears at the other. Their presence in the photograph represents two Jewish survivors who reached the same historic link-up from opposite sides of the bridge.

Thau's appearance in the photograph, together with his documented wartime and postwar activities, has preserved his place in the historical record of both the Elbe link-up and the experiences of Jewish survivors of World War II.

== See also ==
- Jewish resistance in German-occupied Europe
- Jewish partisans
- Elbe Bridge handshake photograph

== Bibliography ==
- Bauer, Yehuda (1970). Flight and Rescue: Brichah. Random House.
- Brandon, Ray; Lower, Wendy, eds. (2008). The Shoah in Ukraine: History, Testimony, Memorialization (PDF). Bloomington, IN: Indiana University Press in association with the United States Holocaust Memorial Museum. pp. 76–80. ISBN 978-0-253-35084-8.
- Brecher, Michael; Wilkenfeld, Jonathan (1997). A Study of Crisis. University of Michigan Press. ISBN 0-472-10806-9.
- Bronstein, Shalom (2025). "Biographical Dictionary of Jewish Resistance". JewishGen.
- Browning, Christopher R. (2004). The Origins of the Final Solution. Lincoln: University of Nebraska Press. ISBN 978-0-8032-1327-2.
- Central Intelligence Agency (1955). Clothing and Individual Equipment — Soviet Army. Washington, D.C.: Central Intelligence Agency.
- Der Spiegel (2025). "Spirit of Survival: Jewish Partisans from Galicia Remember Soviet Times". Der Spiegel.
- Friedman, Thomas L. (9 May 1995). "Clinton and Yeltsin Honor Dead in Berlin". The New York Times.
- Getty Images (Hulton Archive) (6 April 2014). "US & Russian Troops (Torgau, 26 April 1945)".
- Glantz, David M. (1995). When Titans Clashed: How the Red Army Stopped Hitler. University Press of Kansas.
- Gorbachev, Mikhail (1996). Memoirs. Doubleday. ISBN 978-0-385-48019-2.
- Gross, Jan Tomasz (2002). Revolution from Abroad: The Soviet Conquest of Poland's Western Ukraine and Western Belorussia (Expanded ed.). Princeton, NJ: Princeton University Press. ISBN 978-0-691-09603-2.
- Hadtörténelmi Levéltár (Archive of Military History) (1941). Hadinapló: 1. Hegyi Dandár [War Diary: 1st Mountain Brigade] (Archival record). Budapest, Hungary: Royal Hungarian Army Records, 1941–1944. Fond 1, Gyorshadtest / Kárpát Csoport.
- Haynie, Olivia (22 April 2025). "Hidden in a Famous WWII Photo: Two Heroic Jewish Stories". The Forward.
- Heinz, Joachim; Harmann, Markus (25 April 2025). "Handschlag von Torgau: Sieben Soldaten und ein Bild für die Ewigkeit". Der Spiegel (in German).
- Itskovich, Aleksandr (24 April 2025). Эльба: рукопожатие выживших [Elbe: The handshake of survivors]. Lechaim (in Russian).
- "Zablotov (in Jewish Galicia & Bukovina)". Jewish Galicia and Bukovina. JGB Organization.
- Kahan, Schmuel (2017) [1949]. A City and the Dead: Zablotow Alive and Destroyed: Memorial Book of Zabolotov (Memorial book). New York: JewishGen.
- Lavsky, Hagit (2002). New Beginnings: Holocaust Survivors in Bergen-Belsen and the British Zone in Germany, 1945–1950. Detroit: Wayne State University Press.
- Levine, Allan (2010). Fugitives of the Forest. Lyons Press.
- Lviv Center for Urban History. "Soviet Occupation (1939–1941)". Lviv Interactive.
- MacDonald, Charles B. (1973). The Last Offensive. United States Army in World War II: European Theater of Operations. Washington, D.C.: Center of Military History, United States Army.
- Merridale, Catherine (2006). Ivan's War. New York: Metropolitan Books. ISBN 978-0-8050-7455-0.
- "Gas Station Operator Recalls U.S.–Russ Union". The Milwaukee Journal. 1 May 1955. p. 193 – via Newspapers.com.
- "Muffler and Brake Mechanic Wanted". Milwaukee Journal. Journal Communications. 10 July 1991. p. 70 – via NewsBank.
- "Automobile Garages — Milwaukee". Milwaukee Sentinel. The Milwaukee Sentinel. 5 November 1961. p. 94 – via NewsBank.
- NASA Ames Research Center (2005). "Retired NASA scientist finds place in history twice". Astrogram: 7.
- Nehari, Miri (2015). "The Association". Ha Bricha Association.
- Niedersen, Uwe, ed. (2007). Elbe Begegnung: Link-Up (3rd rev. and exp. ed.). Torgau: Förderverein Europa Begegnungen e.V.
- Ofer, Dalia (1990). Escaping the Holocaust. New York: Oxford University Press. ISBN 978-0-19-506340-0.
- "Poland, Belarus & Ukraine Report: September 9, 1999". Radio Free Europe/Radio Liberty. 11 November 2008.
- Reese, Roger R. (2011). Why Stalin's Soldiers Fought. Lawrence: University Press of Kansas. ISBN 978-0-7006-1777-7.
- Schöne, Günter, ed. (1995). Down by the Riverside: Die Botschaft von der Elbe, 1945–1995 (in German). Leipzig: Thom Verlag.
- Slepyan, Kenneth (2006). Stalin's Guerrillas: Soviet Partisans in World War II. Lawrence, KS: University Press of Kansas. ISBN 978-0-7006-1417-2.
- Snyder, Timothy (2010). Bloodlands: Europe Between Hitler and Stalin. New York: Basic Books. ISBN 978-0-465-00239-9.
- State Archive of Ivano-Frankivsk Oblast (1939). Tax records of Zabłotów (interwar period). Ivano-Frankivsk: State Archive of Ivano-Frankivsk Oblast.
- Tec, Nechama (1993). Defiance: The Bielski Partisans. New York: Oxford University Press. ISBN 978-0-19-509390-2.
- The Octagonian (Summer 2008). "President's Message: Elbe Photo Correction" (PDF). The Octagonian. XCVI (2): 1.
- Thau, Jeffrey (June 2008). "Memories of a Handshake across the Elbe River Remain 63 Years Later". The Jewish Veteran. 61 (3): 9, 25.
- "Obituary for Charles Thau". The Wisconsin Jewish Chronicle. 21 April 1995. p. 22.
- TsAMO (1945a). Award citation for Medal "For Courage" – Chaim (Charles) Thau (Archival record) (in Russian). Podolsk, Russia: Central Archive of the Ministry of Defense of the Russian Federation. Fond 6274, Opis 342210с, Delo 3, List 29.
- TsAMO (1945b). Red Army medical record documenting wound of Chaim (Charles) Thau (Archival record) (in Russian). Podolsk, Russia: Central Archive of the Ministry of Defense of the Russian Federation. Fond 6274, Opis 429107с, Delo 7, List 23.
- TsAMO (20 October 2025). "Archival certificate for Chaim (Charles) Thau" [Archival certificate] (in Russian). Central Archive of the Ministry of Defense of the Russian Federation.
- TsAMO (20 October 2025). "TsAMO award record and service extract for Chaim (Charles) Thau" [Award record and service extract] (in Russian). Central Archive of the Ministry of Defense of the Russian Federation.
- United States Holocaust Memorial Museum (n.d.). "Jewish Resistance: Partisans and the Forest". Holocaust Encyclopedia.
- US Immigration and Naturalization Service (1951). "USS General M. B. Stewart Manifest, 7 Sept 1951, Arrival NY, NY".
- White House Archives (25 April 2005). "President Welcomes Presidents of the Russian Federation". White House Archives.
- White House Archives (25 April 2010). "Joint Statement on the 65th Anniversary of Elbe Day". White House Archives.
- Wilms, Carolin (24 April 2015). "Spirit of the Elbe". Dayton Daily News.
- World Machal. "French Machal Listing". World Machal — Volunteers from overseas in the Israel Defense Forces. "Thau, Charlie; France; Army; 72nd Battalion - Infantry."
- YIVO (n.d.). "Galicia". YIVO Encyclopedia of Jews in Eastern Europe. YIVO Institute for Jewish Research.
- Yad Vashem (n.d.). "Yad Vashem Survivors and Refugee Forms — Chaim Thau (ID 11670697)".
- Zaffern, Bernard H. (2005). "Moscow Celebration of the 60th Anniversary of V-E Day". Fighting 69th Infantry Division Association Bulletin. 58 (3): 9–11.
- Ziemke, Earl F. (1975). The U.S. Army in World War II: The Red Army and the Elbe. Center of Military History, United States Army.
