= Line of Contact =

Farthest advance into German territory at the end of WWII

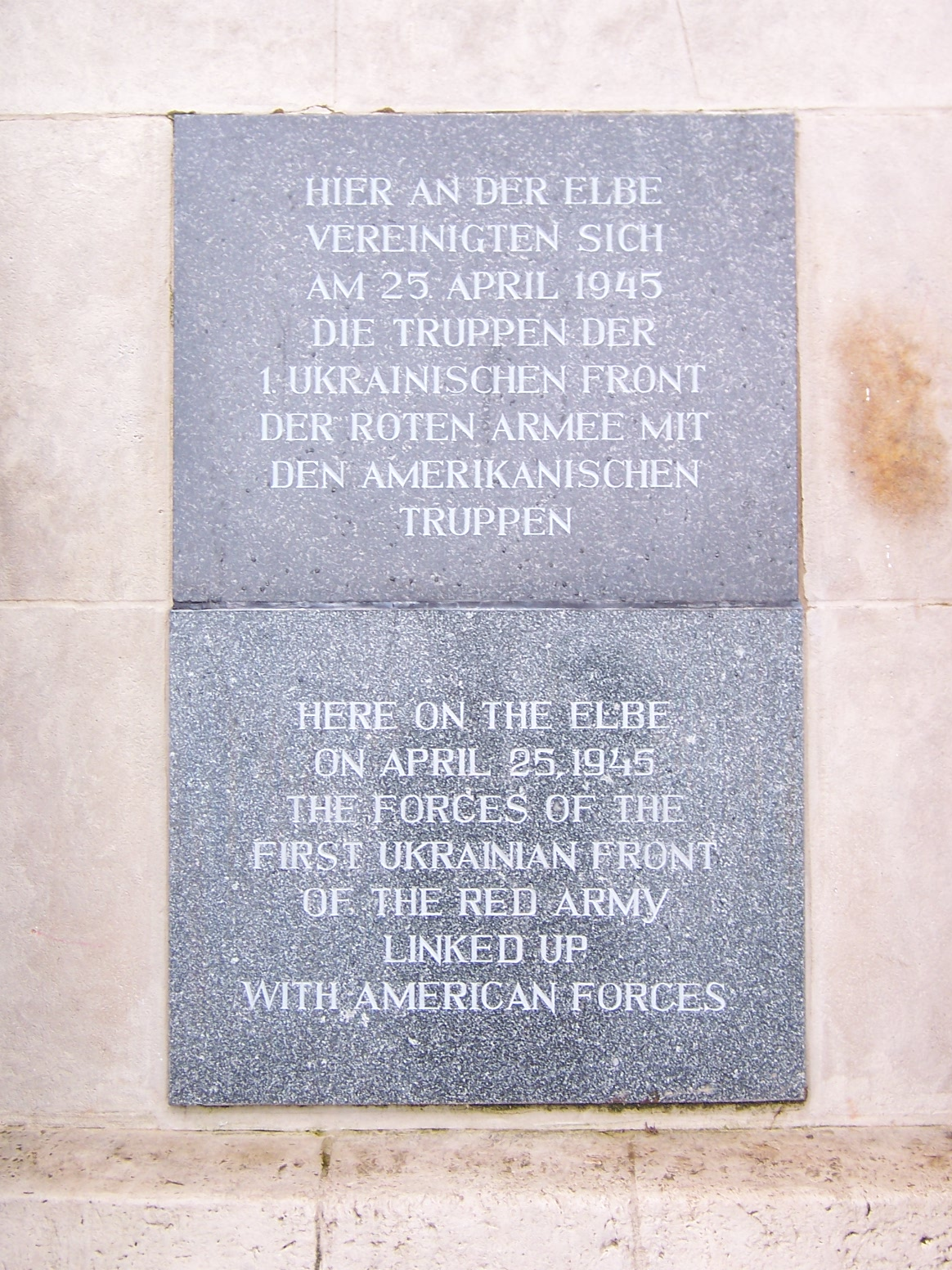
A commemorative plaque now stands where the "East Meets West" moment took place in Torgau on Elbe Day, 1945.

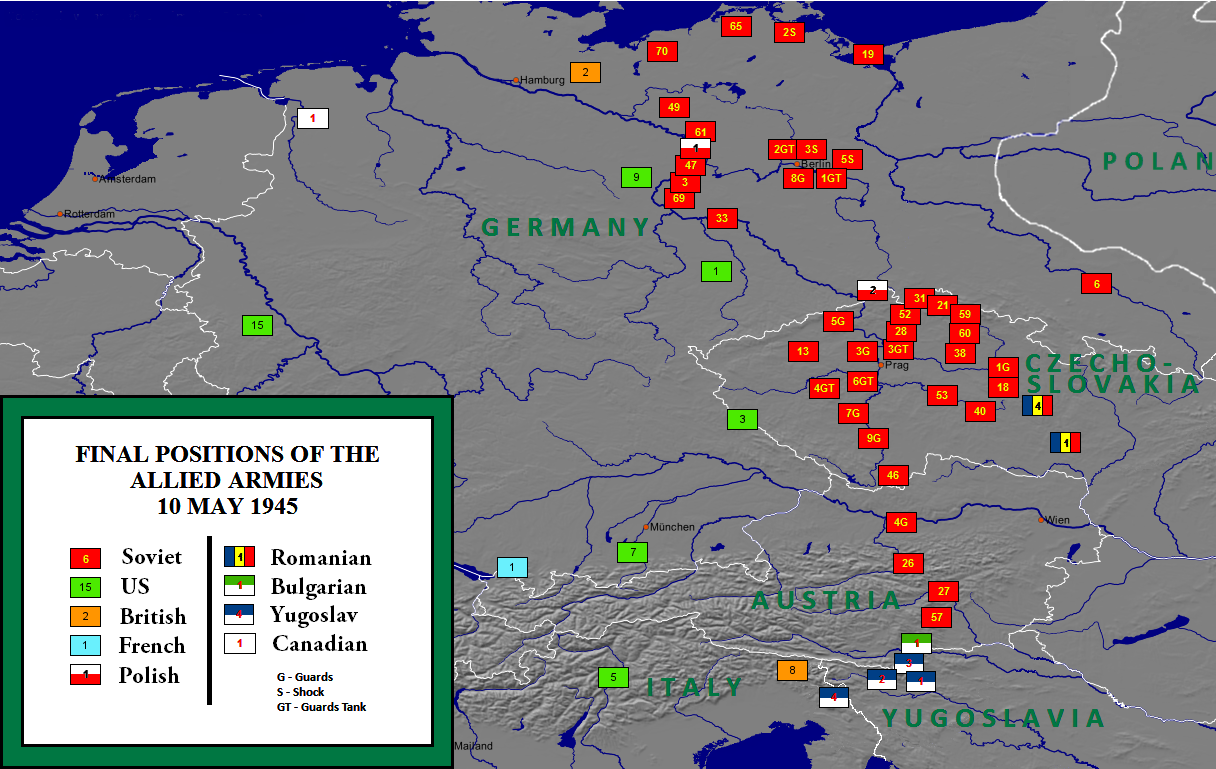
Final positions of the Western Allied and Soviet armies, May 1945

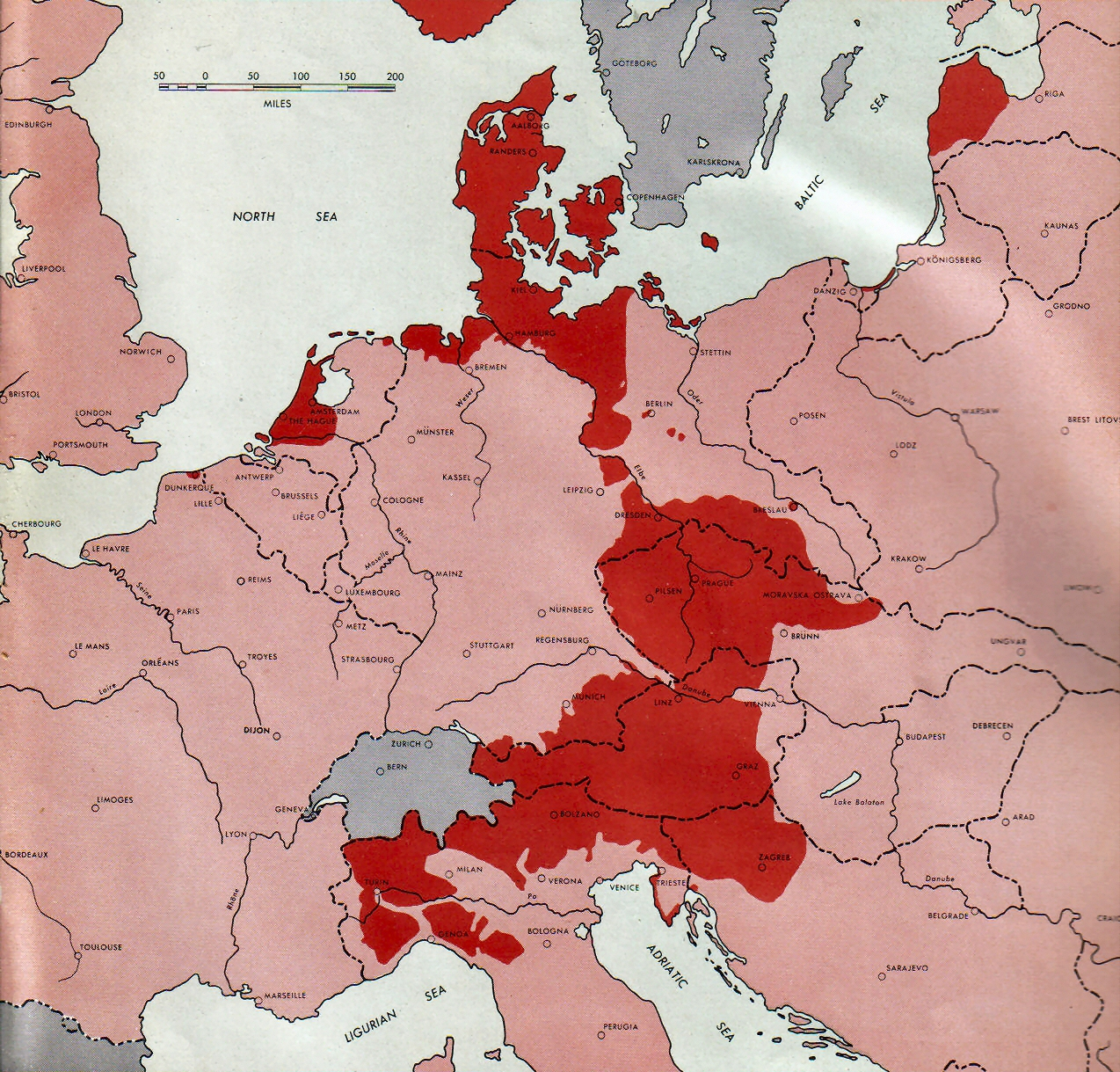
Allied occupied areas, 15 May 1945, with territory under Allied control on 1 May 1945 in pink and later Allied gain in red

The Line of Contact marked the farthest advance of American, British, French, and Soviet armies into German controlled territory at the end of World War II in Europe. In general a "line of contact" refers to the demarcation between two or more given armies, whether they are allied or belligerent.

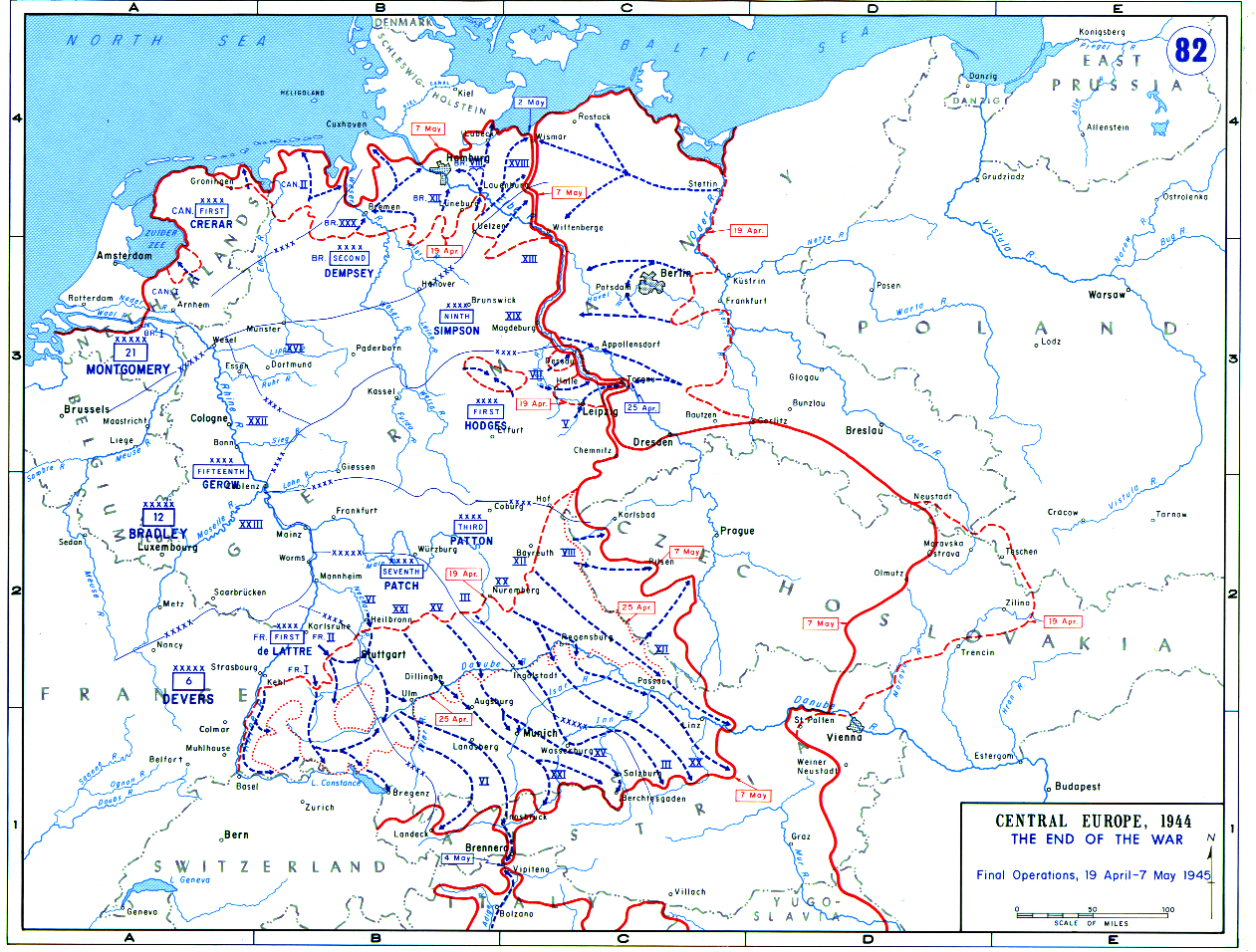
Final positions of the Western Allied and Soviet armies, May 8, 1945. Areas not yet occupied also indicated.

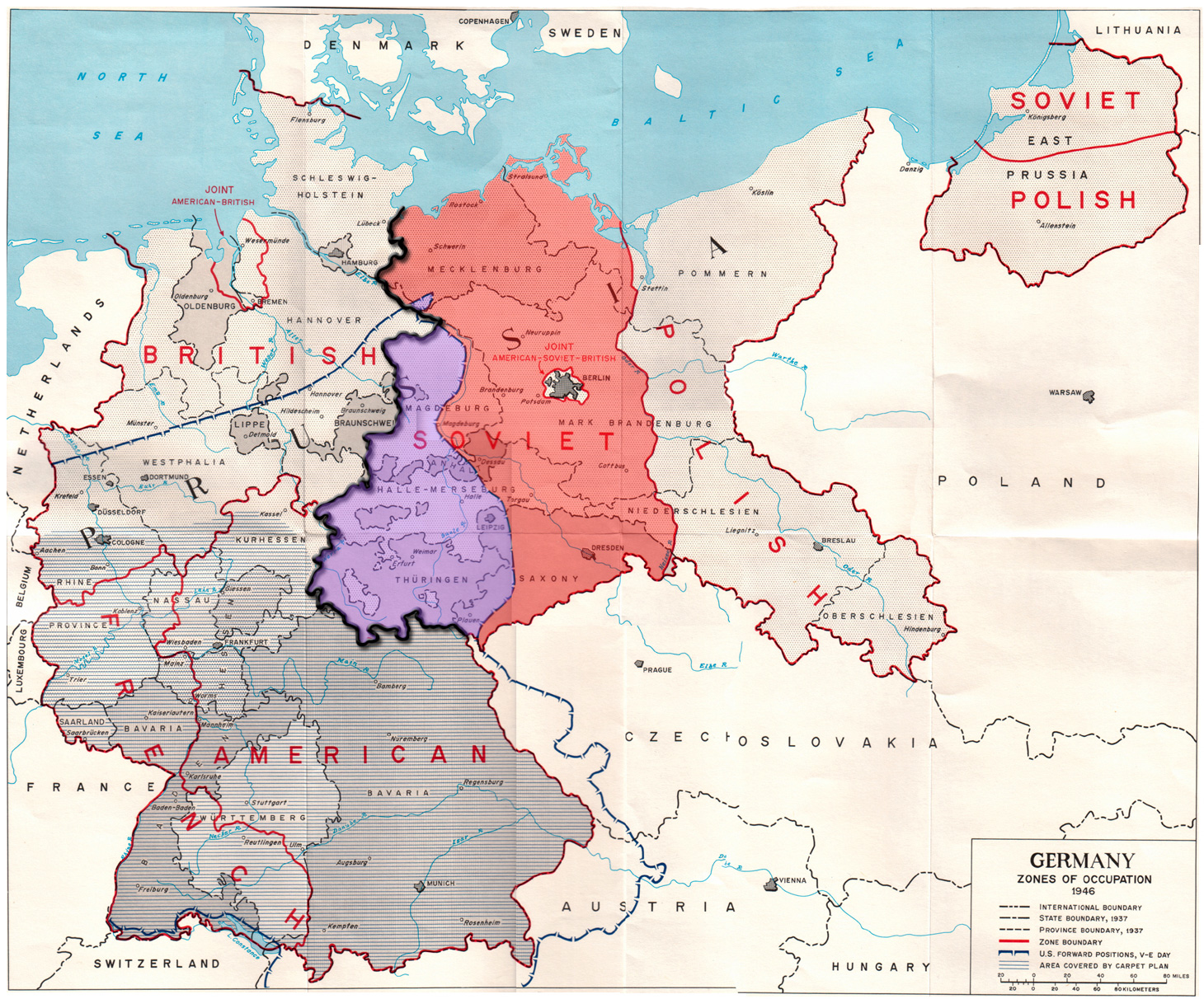
Areas vacated by U.S. forces to Soviet forces in summer 1945 shown in lilac, not including the areas of Mecklenburg already ceded by US/British forces to Soviet control earlier

The first contacts were made by the US 273rd Infantry Regiment, 69th Infantry Division and Soviet 58th Guards Rifle Division.

The first visual contact occurred at 11:30 am, April 25, in the village of Leckwitz, when First Lieutenant Arnold Kotzebue, from the 69th Infantry Division, saw a horseman, named Aitkali Alibekov, riding into the courtyard of one of the houses on the central street. The patrol was on the west bank of the Elbe at 12:05, and across by 12:30. Kotzebue had gone from Leckwitz to the Elbe at Strehla, which he mistook for Groba, on his map, where he made his crossing and engaged in some discussion with several Russian Officers before being returned to the west bank of the river and transported to another crossing site at a ferry farther north. Later that day, after meeting Kotzebue, Major Frederick W. Craig made contact with the Soviets at 16:45 in Clanzchwitz. These two contacts thus far had come in the sector of General Rusakov's 175th Infantry Regiment, whose commander was Lieutenant Colonel Alexander T. Gardiev.

The same day, at 16:00, Second Lieutenant William D. Robertson also made contact with Soviet elements.

The line continued to form as American, British, French and Soviet forces took control of, or defeated, Nazi forces, up until the time of the May 8 unconditional surrender of Germany and beyond. This line of contact did not conform to the agreed-upon occupation zones, as stipulated in the Yalta Conference. Rather, it was simply the place where the two armies met each other. The Western Allies had actually gone far beyond the Yalta agreement boundaries, in some cases up to 320 kilometres (200 mi) past, going deep into the states of Mecklenburg, Saxony-Anhalt, Saxony, as well as Brandenburg. The capital of Mecklenburg, the city of Schwerin, was captured on May 2, 1945. The city of Leipzig, in Saxony, was probably the largest of the cities captured by the Americans that were inside the areas to be later passed to the Soviets. The land of Thuringia was completely occupied by American forces.

Other places where Western Allied Forces crossed the demarcation lines were:

- Schwerin, Magdeburg, taken over by the Soviet from the British on July 1, 1945
- Leipzig, taken over by the Soviets from the Americans on July 3, 1945
- Erfurt, evacuated by American forces between July 1 and 2, and occupied by the Soviets on July 3

Other points of contact between Western Allies forces and Soviet forces before the end of the war in Europe were:

- Wismar on the Baltic coast
- The Stör Canal, where Soviet and American forces met on May 4, 1945
- Dessau and Pratau, contact being made on 26 April 1945, an area east of Leipzig
- Linz, where Soviet and American armies met in Austria
- Trieste, where New Zealand units and Yugoslavian partisans made contact on May 3, 1945

US forces generally held onto these gains within Germany until July 1945, when under orders from President Harry S. Truman – and against the advice of British Prime Minister Winston Churchill – the US forces withdrew to the Yalta agreement boundaries dividing Germany into occupation zones. The Soviet Union might not have allowed American, British and French forces into Berlin, which was completely under their control, if the U.S. had not honored the Yalta agreement boundaries. The German areas relinquished by American troops became part of the Soviet-dominated East Germany.

The US Army did not withdraw from western Czechoslovakia until December 1945, as part of an agreement removing all American and Soviet troops from the country. US, British, French and Soviet controlled territory in Austria was incorporated into an occupation plan. Austria remained technically an occupied country by the Four Powers until 1955, when all foreign troops departed. Austria became a neutral country outside of the Iron Curtain, whereas Czechoslovakia fell inside the Iron Curtain and thus allied with the Soviet Union through the Warsaw Pact.

== See also ==
- Elbe Day
