= Adrian Dvir =

Romanian medium and author (1958–2004)

- Born: 1958; Bucharest, Romania
- Died: 6 June 2004 (aged 45–46); Israel
- Occupation(s): Author, medium, computer developer
- Children: 2
- Website: adriandvir.com (archived)

Adrian Dvir (1958 in Bucharest, Romania – 6 June 2004) was an author and medium.

He held a B.Sc. (Bachelor of Science) in Engineering and an M.Sc. (Master of Science) in Computer Engineering, specializing in computer architecture. Married with two children and living in Israel since 1965, Dvir was employed as a developer of military computer systems. He acknowledged and began to use his abilities as a medium in 1992, and claimed to have first became aware of alien and other-dimensional beings in 1994.

Adrian Dvir died on 6 June 2004 from a severe and fatal attack of Infectious mononucleosis and died in his sleep whilst sitting in his armchair.

== Books ==
Dvir is the author of three books, of which only one has been translated to English. His first book, X3, healing, entities and aliens, was published in Hebrew in 2000, and was closely followed by his second book, Cured by aliens. It was about another year until his first book was translated to English, in 2003. His third book was published in Romanian, and is actually his two previous books under a single binder.
