= Elbe Bridge handshake photograph =

1945 World War II photograph

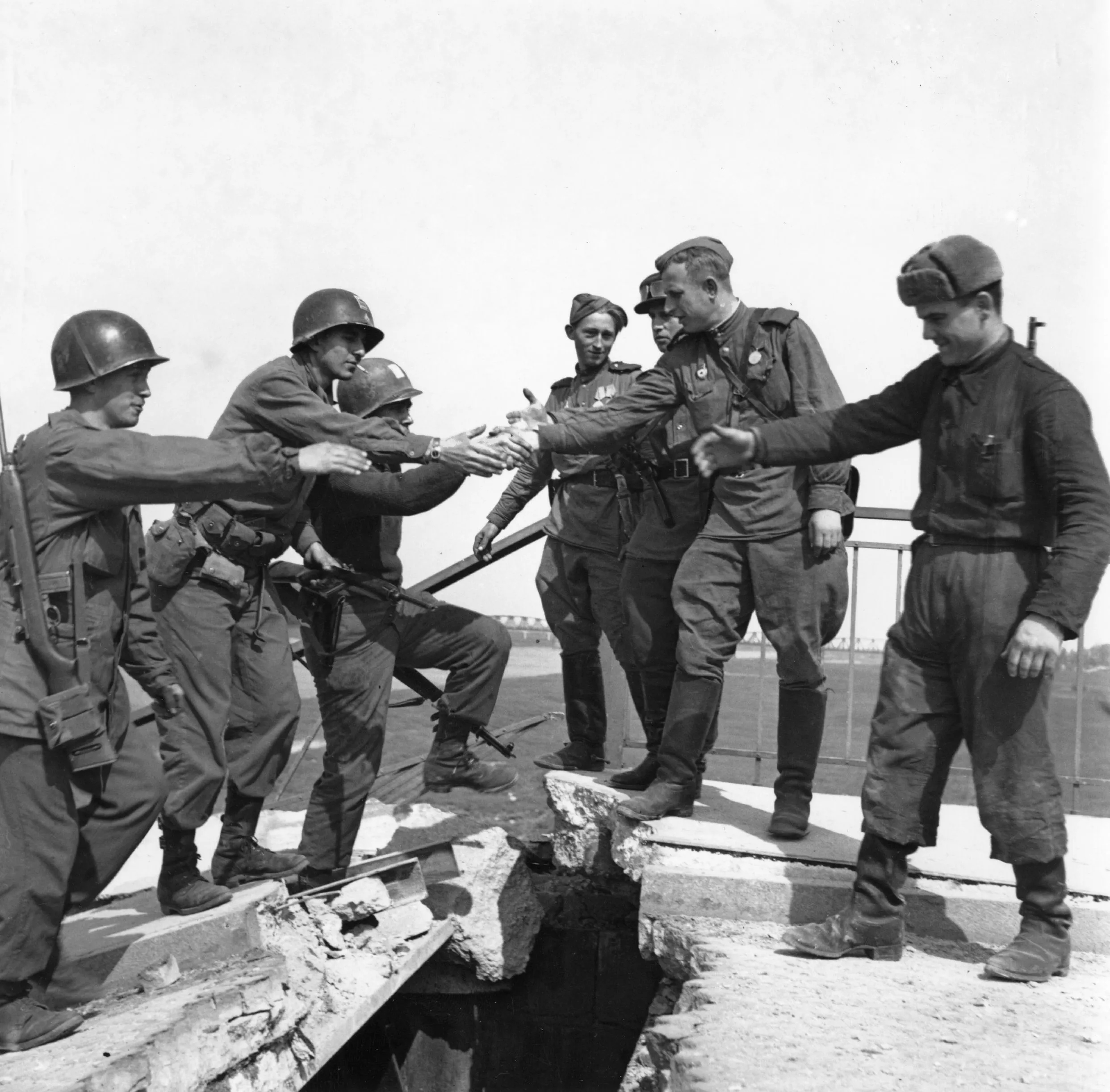
Staged photograph of the American-Soviet link-up on the Elbe River bridge near Torgau, Germany, April 26, 1945. The photograph was taken the day after the initial contact between American and Soviet.

The Elbe Bridge handshake photograph, also known as the "East Meets West" photograph, is a staged World War II photograph taken by American photographer Allan Jackson at Torgau, Germany, on April 26, 1945. It depicts American and Soviet soldiers meeting on the damaged Elbe bridge the day after American and Soviet forces made contact near Torgau. The photograph became one of the widely distributed images associated with the end of World War II in Europe.

For many years, one of the American soldiers in the photograph was misidentified in historical accounts. Archival research conducted in 2008 led to the identification of the soldier as Bernard E. Kirschenbaum rather than Delbert E. Philpott. The photograph remains an enduring visual representation of the American-Soviet link-up at the end of the war in Europe.

The American soldiers shown include Technician Fifth Grade (T/5) Bernard E. Kirschenbaum, second from the left, and Technician Fifth Grade (T/5) Richard Johnson, third from the left. Lieutenant Charles Thau, a Polish-born soldier serving in the Soviet Army, is visible facing the camera behind the handshake at the center of the group. (Note: The photograph was taken during a formal, press-arranged meeting staged for photographers after the initial contact between US and Soviet patrols earlier on 25 April 1945.)

== Background ==
On April 25, 1945, American forces of the 69th Infantry Division and Soviet forces of the 58th Guards Rifle Division made contact near Torgau as Allied forces advanced toward the end of the European war. The encounter became an important symbol of American-Soviet cooperation.

On April 26, Jackson photographed a staged reconstruction of the encounter on the damaged Elbe bridge. The photograph was subsequently reproduced widely and became an enduring visual representation of the American-Soviet link-up.

The photograph was also reproduced in commemorative accounts of the event and used as the inspiration for a bas-relief at the National World War II Memorial in Washington, D.C.

== Identification dispute ==
For many years, the American soldier (second from the left) was identified in publications and commemorative accounts as Delbert E. Philpott, a member of the 69th Infantry Division.

The identification had become well established by 2005. Both a 69th Infantry Bulletin, and NASA's Astrogram identified Philpott as the 69th Infantry soldier (second from the left) and described him as an American veteran invited to Moscow for the 60th-anniversary commemoration of the end of the war. Those articles both state that Philpott attended the Kremlin's "Presidents' Table" as the representative of the veterans group, alongside U.S. President George W. Bush and Russian President Vladimir Putin.

Nevertheless, a conflicting identity was asserted more than a decade earlier. During the 50th-anniversary commemorations in Torgau in 1995, Kirschenbaum encountered Philpott and challenged his claim, according to a later account by Kirschenbaum's daughter, Sara Kirschenbaum. Kirschenbaum also wrote a note in the Torgau city visitors' log that day claiming to be the second American soldier in the photo from the left.

Bernard E. Kirschenbaum's handwritten entry in the Torgau visitors' log, April 25, 1995, identifying himself as the American soldier in the Elbe photograph.

According to Der Spiegel, the entry was not recognized as significant at the time and remained unnoticed until it was revealed during a related 2008 investigation into this photograph.

== The 2008 investigation ==
In 2008, the identification was re-examined after researcher and retired U.S. Air Force colonel Jeff Thau encountered the Kirschenbaum name as published in The Octagonian, the magazine of Sigma Alpha Mu, wherein it was claimed Kirschenbaum was in the photo. Jeff Thau, the son of Charles Thau (the Soviet lieutenant in the photograph), contacted 69th Infantry Division historian Joe Lipsius. Thau subsequently pursued attempts, including multiple calls and discussions directly with Kirschenbaum, to resolve the identity conflicts through historical and archival research.

Lipsius’ and Thau’s investigation highlighted a wartime report by Colonel Adams placing Technician Fifth Grade Bernard E. Kirschenbaum with Adams's American party at Torgau on April 26, 1945.

The available records cited in the investigation for that day placed Philpott's 271st Regiment near Leipzig, while Kirschenbaum's 273rd Regiment was at Torgau.

Following both the 69th Infantry Division and Thau's review of unit records and the Adams report, they were sent to Torgau officials. German historian Uwe Niedersen, who had previously identified Philpott in his published work on the Elbe link-up, located the material he already reviewed from years earlier concerning activities at the Elbe linkup near Torgau in April 1945. (Note: Niedersen had previously published the Philpott identification. In September 2008, he located the materiel he used earlier for identification purposes. Niedersen previously overlooked content identifying T/5 Bernard Kirschenbaum as having remained with Lt. Brooks on the east side of the Elbe and now reversed his long standing position. Thau is, in early September 2008 Niedersen expressed strong confidence that Kirschenbaum was the man in Allan Jackson's photograph.)

In September 2008, Niedersen reversed his decades long concurrence supporting Philpott being in the photo. He communicated his findings to Joe Lipsius, stating his initial support for over a decade which he identified Philpott in the photo was incorrect. He reluctantly conveyed the archival material indeed placed Kirschenbaum with Adams's party at Torgau and that he was now "very sure" Kirschenbaum was the man in the Allan Jackson photograph.

The revised identification was subsequently reported in secondary historical publications. As late as 2017, documents were still being corrected, such as in Military History Now, which credited Thau with researching the identification. In April 2025, The Forward and Der Spiegel independently detailed the identification dispute and subsequent research.

== Aftermath and significance ==
The photograph remains an enduring visual emblem of the brief moment of Allied cooperation at the end of the European war. The resolution of the identification dispute through archival research illustrates the value of continued historical scrutiny of well-known images. The corrected identification has been adopted in subsequent historical accounts, and the photograph continues to be used in commemorations of the American-Soviet link-up.

== Bibliography ==
- Getty Images (April 6, 2014). "US & Russian Troops".
- NASA Ames Research Center (September 2005). "Retired NASA scientist finds place in history twice" (PDF).
- "Faces of War: Meet the Extraordinary People in 10 of WW2's Most Famous Images". Military History Now. July 6, 2017. Editorial note under "Hands Across the Elbe".
- Wilms, Carolin; Powell, Lisa (2023). "78 years ago, a brief meeting of soldiers helps end a war". The Jewish American Warrior / Dayton Daily News.
- Haynie, Olivia (April 22, 2025). "Hidden in a famous WWII photo, two heroic Jewish stories". The Forward. para. 3.
- Heinz, Joachim; Harmann, Markus (April 25, 2025). "Handschlag von Torgau: Sieben Soldaten und ein Bild für die Ewigkeit". Der Spiegel (in German).
- Barratt, Norman (January–April 1996). "The Fighting 69th". The Fighting 69th Infantry Division Bulletin. 49 (2): 39.
- Adams, Charles M. (1945). Report concerning the Torgau link-up (Official military report). 69th Infantry Division, U.S. Army.
- Schöne, Günter; Philpott, Delbert E.; Niedersen, Uwe (1995). Down by the Riverside: Die Botschaft von der Elbe, 1945–1995. Leipzig: Thom.
- Philpott, Delbert E.; Philpott, Donna (1995). Hands Across the Elbe.
- "President's Message: Elbe Photo Correction" (PDF). The Octagonian. XCVI (2). 69th Infantry Division Association: 1. Summer 2008.
- Uwe Niedersen (September 4, 2008). "Letter to Joe Lipsius regarding Bernard Kirschenbaum identification". Letter to Joe Lipsius. Torgau, Germany: Förderverein Europa Begegnungen e.V.
