= Valeriu Georgescu =

Romanian diplomat and trade union leader

Romania's Ambassador to Israel
- In office 19 August 1969 – 1971
- Preceded by: Position established (previously Envoy)
- Succeeded by: Ion Covaci

Romania's Envoy Extraordinary and Minister Plenipotentiary to Israel
- In office February 1966 – 19 August 1969
- Succeeded by: Position upgraded to Ambassador

Romania's Ambassador to Guinea
- In office 1973 – October 1981

Romania's Ambassador to Indonesia
- In office 1984–1988

Personal details
- Born: Romania
- Party: Romanian Communist Party
- Occupation: Diplomat, trade union official
- Known for: First Romanian ambassador to Israel; diplomatic service during the Six-Day War

Valeriu Georgescu is a retired Romanian diplomat who served as Romania's first ambassador to Israel, appointed during the period of the 1967 Six-Day War, and later represented Romania in West Africa and Southeast Asia.

== Early career in the trade union movement ==
Georgescu worked within Romania's early state trade union structure. From 1955 to 1957 he chaired the Central Committee of the Trade Union of Workers in Finance and People's Councils. From 1960 to 1966, he sat on the Council of Romanian Trade Unions.

== Envoy and first ambassador to Israel ==
Georgescu entered the Romanian foreign service in February 1966, when he was appointed extraordinary envoy and minister plenipotentiary to Tel Aviv. On 20 August 1966, he was one of the attendees - part of the presidium as well - at a Maki festive engagement celebrating Romania’s liberation by the Soviet Union at the Sheraton Hotel in Tel Aviv. On 18 May 1967, he had talks with Rolf Friedemann Pauls, the ambassador extraordinary and plenipotentiary of West Germany in Israel, about bilateral relations and the viewpoint of Germany with regard to its relations with other socialist countries.

Georgescu kept his post through the June 1967 Six-Day war, a period when Romania was the only Warsaw Pact country to maintain diplomatic relations with Israel while most of the Communist Eastern bloc severed ties. In a telegram to Bucharest that June, Georgescu reported a discussion with Shmuel Mikunis, secretary general of the Maki, who lauded Romania for its support during the war and contrasted it with the Soviet Union’s position, which Mikunis painted as belligerent to Israel. Georgescu ultimately viewed the war as one of defense from Israel’s behalf.

In August 1969, Georgescu was named Romania's first ambassador to Israel, having previously held the rank of minister.Romania–Israel: Diplomatic Relations, 1948–1969 records that Valeriu Georgescu presented his letters of credence to President Zalman Shazar on 19 August 1969. He served in that post until 1971, after which he continued to work at the Ministry of Foreign Affairs in Bucharest.

=== Ambassador in West Africa ===
From 1973 to October 1981, Georgescu was Romania's ambassador in Conakry, Guinea, with concurrent accreditation to Freetown, Sierra Leone. His mandate was later extended to cover Bamako, Mali, from 1974, Guinea-Bissau, and, from April 1976, Praia, Cape Verde.

=== Ambassador to Indonesia and Southeast Asia ===
From 1984 to 1988, Georgescu served as Romania's ambassador in Jakarta, Indonesia. During that posting he was also accredited to Kuala Lumpur, Malaysia, from November 1985, and to Singapore from February 1986. On February 19, 1986, Georgescu specially presented his credentials to Singaporean president Wee Kim Wee.

== Later life ==
Georgescu is retired from the diplomatic service. He however built a personal art collection over the course of his service in Israel, West Africa, and Indonesia, including works by Romanian artists such as Sabin Bălașa, Ștefan Câlția, Paul Neagu, and Geta Brătescu. In April 2026, the Bucharest auction house Artmark presented part of that collection for sale at the Cesianu-Racoviță Palace and online, describing it as reflecting the range of places where he served.
