= Israel–Romania relations =

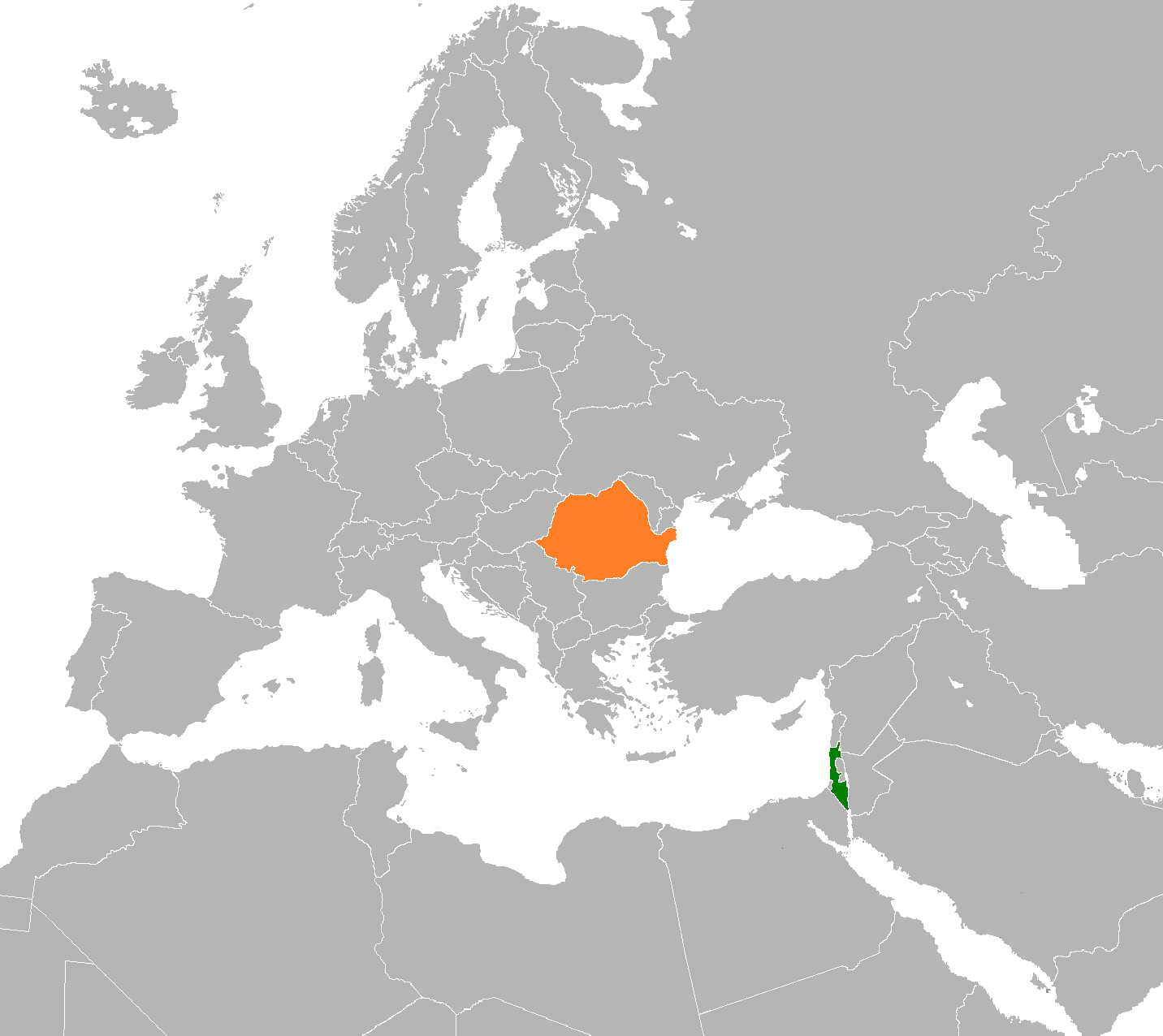
- Israel: Romania

Israel–Romania relations are foreign relations between Israel and Romania. The two nations established diplomatic relations on 11 June 1948. Israel has an embassy in Bucharest. Romania has an embassy in Tel Aviv and a general consulate in Haifa, and 2 honorary consulates (in Jerusalem and Tel Aviv). The two have signed treaties and agreements and both are full members of the Union for the Mediterranean.

== History ==
During the Cold War, Romania was the only communist country not to break its diplomatic relations with Israel. The two countries signed a trade agreement on 30 January 1971 during Israeli Minister of Agriculture visit to Bucharest. In May 1972, Golda Meir was the first Israeli prime-minister to visit Romania. In 1984, the Romanian minister of tourism visited Israel. The Romanian foreign minister Ioan Totu arrived in January 1988 accompanied by his department director, Mielcioiu. The minister of foreign trade and international cooperation, Ioan Unger came with a Romanian delegation in October 1988. Nicolae Ceaușescu's emissaries were sent for talks with Israeli leaders, though the head of state himself did not pay an official visit, claiming he would only do so when the Arab-Israeli conflict was resolved.

In an article in the Israel Journal for Foreign Affairs, Ambassador Avi Millo described how, during his posting (1996-2001), he hosted many dignitaries including the then prime minister, Professor Radu Vasile, at his residence in Bucharest. He served traditional Jewish cuisine to his Romanian guests and used it to teach them about Israeli culture. These meals, he stressed, facilitated conversation, trust, and enhanced the relationship between Israel and Romania.

In 2010, Israeli President Shimon Peres visited Romania and met with several Romanian leaders, among them President Traian Basescu, Senate leader Mircea Geoana and House Speaker Roberta Anastase. They discussed cooperation in the areas of defense, technology, education, business and tourism, and signed two agreements.

In 2014, Romanian Prime Minister Victor Ponta arrived in Israel and met with Israeli President Shimon Peres and Israeli Prime Minister Benjamin Netanyahu.

In March 2016, Romanian President Klaus Werner Iohannis arrived in Israel and met with Israeli President Reuven Rivlin, Knesset Speaker Yuli Edelstein, and other officials. They discussed terrorism, and Holocaust remembrance.

In April 2018, Romania announced that it would move its embassy in Israel to Jerusalem.

On 17 October 2023, Romanian social-democratic Prime Minister Marcel Ciolacu was the first foreign leader to visit Israel after the 2023 Hamas-led attack on Israel.

In June 2024, a Syrian man threw a Molotov cocktail at the Israeli embassy in Bucharest. There were no victims.

== Trade ==
Israel and Romania trade is also influenced by the EU - Israel Free Trade Agreement from 1995. Israel is considered by Romania to be the biggest trade partner in the area of Africa and the Middle East.

Israel - Romania trade in millions USD-$
	Israel imports Romania exports	Romania imports Israel exports	Total trade value
2023	311.8	509.8	821.6
2022	437.7	304.1	741.8
2021	482.7	169.8	652.5
2020	257.9	133.7	391.6
2019	237.9	118.6	356.5
2018	223.7	139.5	363.2
2017	213.9	128.3	342.2
2016	230.3	116.9	347.2
2015	175.5	128.5	304
2014	168	120.4	288.4
2013	164	112.4	276.4
2012	161.9	174.3	336.2
2011	145.2	153.6	298.8
2010	146.1	235.1	381.2
2009	112.3	135.6	247.9
2008	106.2	230.6	336.8
2007	119.2	240	359.2
2006	102.5	219.8	322.3
2005	100.3	186.8	287.1
2004	97.9	136.1	234
2003	76.7	120.9	197.6
2002	79	111.9	190.9

== Tourism ==
Israel and Romania allows the citizens of each other to visit without visa since 2008. Both countries are considered popular travel destination with many flights per day.

Tourism of Romanians in Israel and Israelis in Romania
	2023	2022	2021	2020	2019	2018	2017	2016	2015
Tourists form Israel Arriving to Romania	151,454	159,579	50,310	29,162	235,128	278,211	293,150	252,243	219,486
Tourists from Romania Arriving to Israel	95,300	50,300	2,000	24,800	121,100	106,900	78,900	48,800	43,200

== Resident diplomatic missions ==
- Israel has an embassy in Bucharest.
- Romania has an embassy in Tel Aviv and a consulate-general in Haifa.

== See also ==
- Emigration of Jews from Romania
- Foreign relations of Israel
- Foreign relations of Romania
- History of the Jews in Romania
- List of ambassadors of Romania to Israel
