= Bricha =

Underground organized migration 1944-48

Bricha (Hebrew: בריחה, romanized: briḥa, lit. 'escape, flight'), also called the Bericha Movement, was the underground organized effort that helped Jewish Holocaust survivors settle in British Mandate for Palestine in violation of the White Paper of 1939. It ended when Israel declared independence and annulled the White Paper.

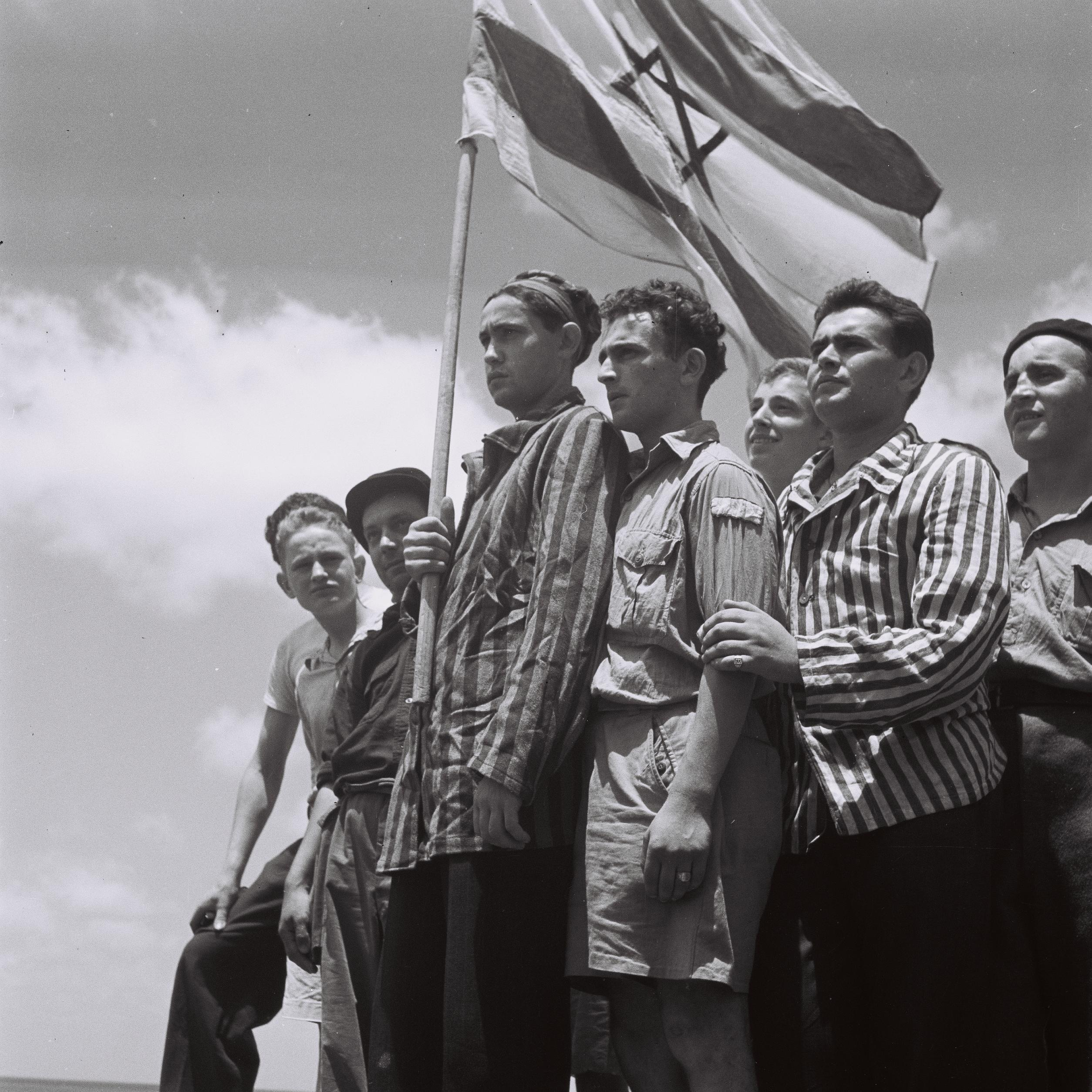
July 15, 1945. Buchenwald survivors arrive in Haifa to be arrested by the British.

After American, British and Soviet armed forces liberated the camps, survivors suffered from disease, severe malnutrition and depression. Many were displaced persons who were unable to return to their homes from before the war. In some areas, the survivors continued to face antisemitic violence; during the 1946 Kielce pogrom in Poland 42 survivors were killed when their communal home was attacked by a mob. For many of the survivors, Europe had become "a vast cemetery of the Jewish people" and "they wanted to start life over and build a new national Jewish homeland in Eretz Yisrael".

The movement of Jewish refugees from the Displaced Persons camp in which they were held (one million persons classified as "not repatriable" remained in Germany and Austria) to Palestine was illegal on both sides, as Jews were not officially allowed to leave the countries of Central and Eastern Europe by the Soviet Union and its allies, nor were they permitted to settle in Palestine by the British.

In late 1944 and early 1945, Jewish members of the Polish resistance met up with Warsaw Ghetto fighters in Lublin to form Bricha as a way of escaping the antisemitism of Europe, where they were convinced that another Holocaust would occur. After the liberation of Rivne, Eliezer and Abraham Lidovsky, and Pasha (Isaac) Rajchmann, concluded that there was no future for Jews in Poland. They formed an artisan guild to cover their covert activities, and they sent a group to Cernăuţi, Romania to seek out escape routes. It was only after Abba Kovner, and his group from Vilna joined, along with Yitzhak Zuckerman, who had headed the Jewish Combat Organization of the Polish uprising of August 1944, in January 1945, that the organization took shape. They soon joined up with a similar effort led by the Jewish Brigade and eventually the Haganah (the Jewish clandestine army in Palestine).

Officers of the Jewish Brigade of the British army assumed control of the operation, along with operatives from the Haganah who hoped to smuggle as many displaced persons as possible into Palestine through Italy. The American Jewish Joint Distribution Committee funded the operation.

Almost immediately, the explicitly Zionist Berihah became the main conduit for Jews coming to Palestine, especially from the displaced person camps, and it initially had to turn people away due to too much demand.

After the Kielce pogrom of 1946, the flight of Jews accelerated, with 100,000 Jews leaving Eastern Europe in three months. Operating in Poland, Romania, Hungary, Czechoslovakia, and Yugoslavia through 1948, Berihah transferred approximately 250,000 survivors into Austria, Germany, and Italy through elaborate smuggling networks. Using ships supplied at great cost by the Mossad Le'aliyah Bet, then the immigration arm of the Yishuv, these refugees were then smuggled through the British cordon around Palestine. Bricha was part of the larger operation known as Aliyah Bet, and ended with the establishment of Israel, after which immigration to the Jewish state was legal, although emigration was still sometimes prohibited, as happened in both the Eastern Bloc and Arab countries (see for example refusenik).

== See also ==
- Aliyah Bet
- Mossad LeAliyah Bet
- Tilhas Tizig Gesheften
- Charles Thau
