= Israel Carmi =

- ישראל כרמי
- Born: Israel Weinman; 1917; Danzig (now Gdańsk, Poland)
- Died: January 20, 2008 (aged 90–91); Israel
- Military career
- Allegiance: Mandatory Palestine / Israel
- Branch: Haganah, British Army, Israel Defense Forces
- Service years: 1936–1948, 1952–1971
- Units: Haganah, Special Night Squads, Palestine Police Force, Buffs (Royal East Kent Regiment), Special Interrogation Group, Jewish Brigade, Southern Command, Negev Brigade, Military Police Corps
- Awards: Colonial Police Medal of Valor
- Other work: Founder of Tilhas Tizig Gesheften (TTG Brigade)

Israel Carmi, or Yisrael Carmi (born Israel Weinman, 1917 – 20 January 2008) was an Israeli soldier and the founder of the Tilhas Tizig Gesheften (TTG) Brigade, known for tracking down and executing former Nazi officers after World War II.

== Life ==
Carmi was born in Danzig (now Gdańsk) in 1917. In 1934 he immigrated to Mandatory Palestine at the age of 17, changing his surname from Weinman to Carmi. He settled in kibbutz Givat HaShlosha. At the age of 19 (1936) Carmi was recruited into the Haganah (anglicised Hebrew: "The Defense"), and in the winter of 1936 Carmi volunteered for the Palestine Police Force on orders from Haganah. During the 1936–1939 Arab revolt in Palestine, Carmi fought whilst outnumbered by the revolting Arabs who tried to overrun Kfar Yehezkel, and in 1938 at the age of 21 Carmi was selected for the Special Night Squads, receiving the Colonial Police Medal of Valor for his duties.

In 1939 at the end of the Arab Revolt, Carmi returned to Givat HaShlosha and married Tonka, promising to stay on the farm and grow oranges and melons. However, this changed with the issuance of the White Paper of 1939. Carmi joined the Posh (Haganah unit), whose goal was to 'prevent the British from arresting the underground leaders and messing up covert training grounds.

When World War II broke out, Carmi enlisted in the British Army on orders from the Haganah and was posted to the Buffs (Royal East Kent Regiment). He reached the rank of sergeant. During the summer of 1942 Carmi was stationed in the Sinai where he stole British arms for future use. Carmi also served with the Special Interrogation Group, (Lions of Judah) a commando unit of German-speaking Jews which saw action in the North African campaign. In July 1943 Carmi was in Benghazi as part of the 2nd Battalion of the Palestine Regiment. Carmi caused a mutiny in the 2nd Battalion after the commander ripped down the Zionist flag Carmi had raised instead of a British flag.

In 1944 Carmi joined the Jewish Brigade. He saw action in the final stages of the Italian campaign. He also engaged in underground Haganah activities. Around October 1944 Carmi travelled to Alexandria and then directly to Italy where he smuggled two Haganah operatives as British soldiers, their mission was to determine the truthfulness of the gas chamber rumors. From here Carmi travelled north to a base established in Fiuggi. After this Carmi and other soldiers left Italy for Germany, on the way there was an incident in which the group attacked Wehrmacht POWs and as a result the British ordered them not to enter Germany and to stay in Tarvisio.

In June 1945 Carmi and operatives left the encampment in Tarvisio to visit the Mauthausen Concentration Camp. Carmi asked to be transferred to the intelligence units, where he gathered information regarding the whereabouts of Nazis. Together with Australian-born Robert Grossman, Carmi travelled back to Italy, this time to Tarvisio, and gathered information from locals around the area, including touting for information. Tarvisio was considered the perfect location because the SS stayed throughout the war and the local train station was used in connection with the deportation of Italian Jews, and the area was also full of refugees and recovering Wehrmacht soldiers. Here Carmi got information regarding a high-ranking Gestapo officer in charge of confiscation of the property of Italian Jews. In turn Carmi went to the home of the Gestapo officer disguised as a British officer and searched the home, finding bags of jewellery, guns, and cash.

Upon threats to kill him, the Gestapo officer offered information providing the addresses and other personal information of other SS or Gestapo officers - receiving 18 pages of names. Carmi gave the list of minor officers to the Allied Intelligence Bureau (AIB), but kept the major officers list. Carmi then organised a group of fellow Jewish Brigade officers to track and kill those whose guilt was "definitively established" by evidence. Members of the group included Meir Zorea, Haim Laskov, Abram Silberstein, Marcel Tobias, and Orly Givon. Some offered membership to the group due to the extrajudicial nature of their actions. The group began killing officers from the list, typically stating "in the name of the Jewish people, I sentence you to death," before carrying out a quick field trial, later the officers were killed by strangulation, and two SS officers were pushed over a mountain ledge.

During the 1948 Arab-Israeli War, Carmi served as an officer in the Israel Defense Forces and fought in the Negev. Following the war, he returned to Givat HaShlosha for a while before becoming a career officer in the IDF. He was appointed a battalion commander in 1952 and subsequently served in a series of command positions. In 1954 he became commander of the Armored Corps School. He served in the Suez Crisis as a deputy to David Elazar, then commanded two brigades. In 1962 he was appointed commander of the Military Police Corps, a position he held until he retired from the IDF in 1971.

== See also ==
- Tilhas Tizig Gesheften
- Inglourious Basterds
- Tscherim Soobzokov
- Jewish Brigade
- Hashomer

== Bibliography ==
- Beckham, Morris (1999). The Jewish Brigade: An Army With Two Masters, 1944-45. Sarpedon Publishers. ISBN 1-885119-56-9.
- Blum, Howard (2009). The Brigade: An Epic Story of Vengeance, Salvation, and World War II. Hardscrabble Entertainment. ISBN 978-0-06-093283-1.
- Soshuk, Levi; Azriel Louis Eisenberg (1984). Momentous Century: Personal and Eyewitness Accounts of the Rise of the Jewish Homeland and State, 1875-1978. Associated University Presses. ISBN 978-0-8453-4748-5.
- Kahana, Ephraim (2006). Historical Dictionary of Israeli Intelligence. Rowman & Littlefield. ISBN 978-0-8108-5581-6.
