= Moshe Tavor =

Moshe Tavor (Hebrew: משה תבור; 1917–6 May 2006) was a member of the Jewish Brigade, a unit of the British Army that fought the Germans in Italy in 1944-45. Tavor and others in the unit resolved to take justice into their own hands and pay back the Germans for the atrocities the German army had committed. Using whatever information they could find, they tracked down Germans who, they believed, had participated in killing Jews, and then - wearing British Military Police uniforms they had acquired to give the misleading impression they were conducting an official inquiry - took their captives to isolated places in the forests and executed them, usually by strangulation. Tavor stated, a year or so before his death, that he did not "regret" committing murder without a proper trial, he only regretted what they "didn't do" to their victims.

In 1960, Moshe Tavor was part of the Israeli team that kidnapped former SS Lieutenant Colonel Adolf Eichmann, who was hiding in Argentina. Eichmann, who had coordinated much of the "Final Solution", was brought to Israel, where he was placed on trial and convicted for crimes against the Jewish people, sentenced to death, and executed on 1 June 1962.

== Early life ==
Moshe was born in the town of Botmarnets, near Vilnius, Lithuania. In 1925, when he was seven years old, he immigrated with his family to Mandatory Palestine and was educated in Tel Aviv, in a social school for the children of workers and later in the vocational school Max Pine, where he specialized in the department of metal and mechanical frames. In 1936 he went to training as a member of a youth movement in Kibbutz Degania Alef.

== See also ==
- Tilhas Tizig Gesheften
