= Joel Levi =

Joel Levi (August 25, 1938, in Kfar Sirkin, League of Nations Mandate for Palestine – June 15, 2014, in Ramat Gan) was an Israeli lawyer.

== Life ==
Joel Levi's parents emigrated to Palestine in the 1930s. He studied law in Tel Aviv at the time of the Eichmann trial and completed his legal clerkship with Gabriel Bach. From 1964 he practiced law in his own firm in Tel Aviv. He specialized in restitution proceedings for victims of National Socialism. Since the Washington Declaration in 1998, Levi has also been increasingly entrusted with cases of restitution of looted art.

Levi was a founding member and long-time board member of the German-Israeli Lawyers Association (DIJV/IDJ). He received the Federal Cross of Merit First Class in 2007.

Levi was the initiator of the exhibition Anwalt ohne Recht about the fate of Jewish lawyers in the Third Reich and the initiator of the book Zu Recht wieder Anwalt.

== Writings (selection) ==
- Die Arisierung jüdischer Anwaltskanzleien. In: Anwälte und ihre Geschichte : zum 140. Gründungsjahr des Deutschen Anwaltvereins. Mohr Siebeck, Tübingen 2011, ISBN 978-3-16-150757-1, S. 305–314.
- Nachwort. In: Barbara Sauer, Ilse Reiter-Zatloukal (Hrsg.): Advokaten 1938 : das Schicksal der in den Jahren 1938 bis 1945 verfolgten österreichischen Rechtsanwältinnen und Rechtsanwälte. Manz, Wien 2010, ISBN 978-3-214-04194-6.
- Die Rolle der jüdischen Rechtsanwälte in der Weimarer Republik. In: „Juden ist der Beruf des Rechtsanwalts verschlossen“ : (§ 1 der 5. VO zum Reichsbürgergesetz v. 27.09.1938); Dokumentation zur Ausstellung „Anwalt ohne Recht – Schicksale jüdischer Anwälte in Deutschland nach 1933“ in Hamm vom 3. September bis 20. Oktober 2008. Rechtsanwaltskammer, Hamm 2010, DNB-IDN 1009508423, S. 36–78.

== Literature ==
- Peter Münch: Viel Arbeit, viel Genuss. In: Süddeutsche Zeitung. 28. Dezember 2013, S. 13.
- Hans Bergemann (Hrsg.): Zu Recht wieder Anwalt : jüdische Rechtsanwälte aus Berlin nach 1945. Hentrich & Hentrich, Berlin 2012, ISBN 978-3-942271-73-8.

== See also ==
- Aryanization
- List of claims for restitution for Nazi-looted art
- The Holocaust
- Nazi Germany
