= Yehiel Duvdevani =

Israeli politician (1896–1988)

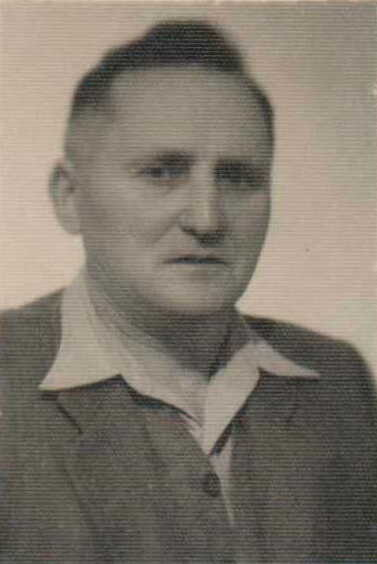
- Duvdevani around 1950

Faction represented in the Knesset
- 1949–1951: Mapai

Personal details
- Born: 1896 Russian Empire
- Died: 30 April 1988 (aged 91–92)

Yehiel Duvdevani (Hebrew: יְחִיאֵל דּוּבְדְּבָנִי; 1896 – 30 April 1988) was a Zionist activist and politician.

== Biography ==
Born in Volhynia region of the Russian Empire (now in Ukraine), Duvdevani attended high school in Kiev, before spending a year at university. He joined the Al HaMishmar movement, which became Dror. In 1923 he made aliyah to Mandatory Palestine, and two years later was amongst the founders of kibbutz Givat HaShlosha.

He became secretary of the Petah Tikva Workers Council. During World War II he enlisted in the Jewish Brigade. Prior to the 1949 elections he was placed nineteenth on the Mapai list, and was elected as the party won 46 seats. However, he did not run for re-election in 1951.

In 1952 Duvdevani was amongst the founders of kibbutz Einat, which was made up of former Givat HaShlosha and Ramat HaKovesh members who had left the HaKibbutz HaMeuhad movement. He later held the post of chief executive of Mekorot between 1954 and 1964, also serving as chair of its board of directors from 1962 to 1964.

He died in 1988.
