= Shmuel Ben-Dror =

Israeli footballer

Shmuel Ben-Dror שמואל בן דרור
Personal information
- Date of birth: 1924
- Place of birth: Petah Tikva
- Date of death: January 6, 2009 (aged 84–85)
- Position: Defender

Senior career*
Years	Team	Apps	(Gls)
- Maccabi Petah Tikva

International career
- Israel
- * Club domestic league appearances and goals

Shmuel Ben Dror (Hebrew: שמואל בן דרור; 1924 – January 6, 2009) was an Israeli association football player.

Ben-Dror was born in moshav Ein Ganim, which later became part of Petah Tikva. He attended Ahad HaAm High School and joined the Haganah as well as the Jewish Settlement Police. During World War II he enlisted in the British Army, served in the Jewish Brigade, and fought in the Italian campaign. He was wounded and hospitalized for an extended period.

Ben-Dror played defense for the Israel national team. He served as their first captain and scored the team's first goal, in 1948.

In addition, he served on the board of directors of the Israel Football Association.
