= Amram Zur =

Amram Zur (died 2005) was Israel's first travel ministry commissioner. He was appointed head of the Jerusalem public relations department.

== Biography ==
Amram Zur served in the Jewish Brigade and later became the first Ministry of Tourism travel commissioner for North America. He was instrumental in increasing the number of visitors to Israel in the 1970s and 1980s and organized the first "peace cruise" travelling between Israel and Egypt.
