= Tilhas Tizi Gesheften =

Group of Jewish Brigade members

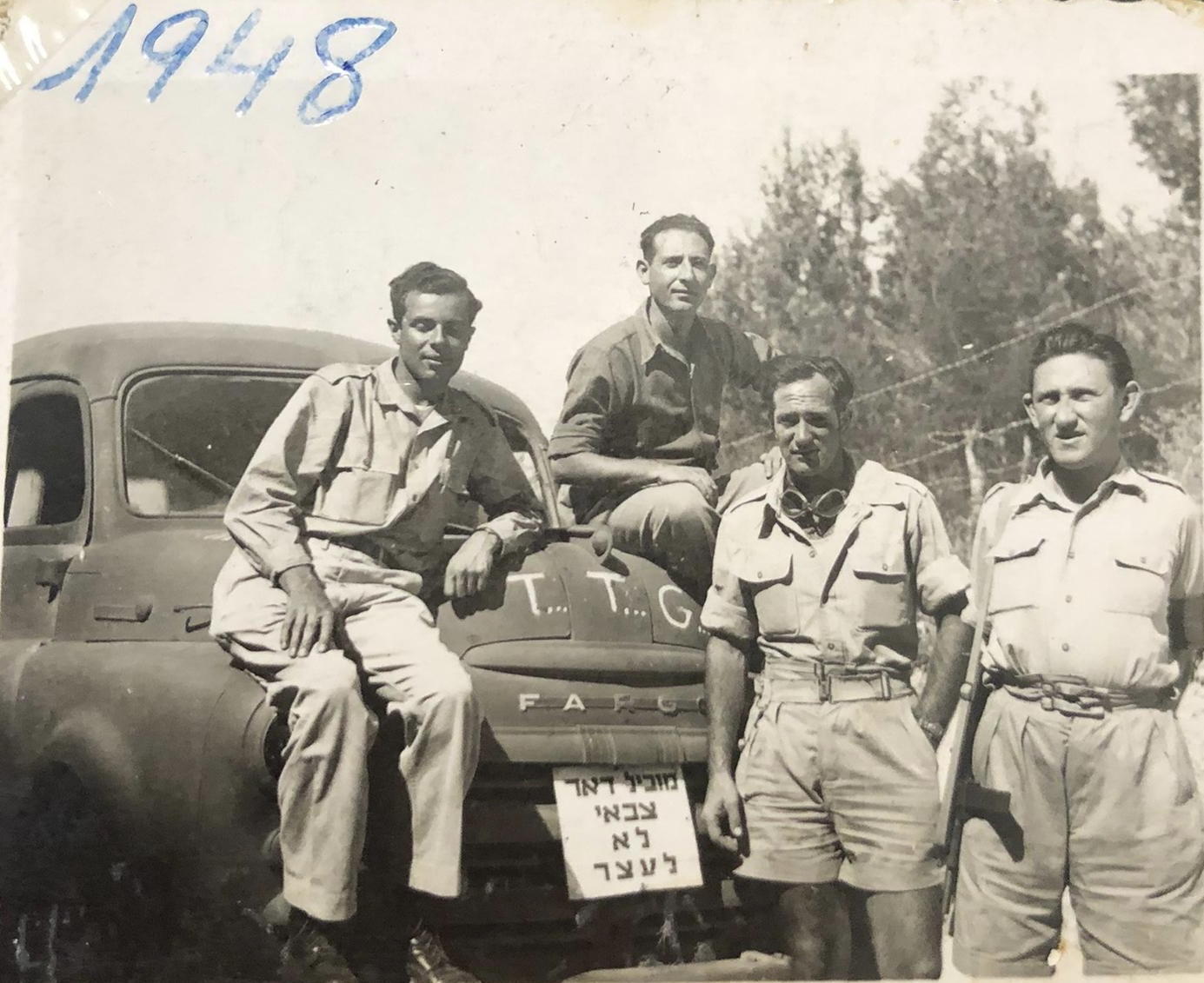
A photograph of a Tilhas Tizig Gesheften group

Tilhas Tizi Gesheften (commonly known by its acronym TTG) was a group of Jewish Brigade members formed immediately following World War II. Under the guise of British military activity, this group engaged in the assassination of Nazis and SS conspirators, facilitated the illegal emigration of Holocaust survivors to Mandatory Palestine, and smuggled weaponry for the Haganah.

== Etymology ==
The three words that make up the phrase are Arabic: تِلحسْ طِيزي, romanized: tilḥas ṭīzī, lit. 'lick my ass' and Yiddish: געשעפטן, romanized: gesheften, lit. 'business', combined to form a modern Hebrew slang expression, meaning 'You-lick-my-ass business'. It has been more colloquially translated as 'up your ass götveren': götveren is a vulgar Turkish slang term for 'queer/fag/faggot'.

== History ==
=== Background ===
Following the collapse of Nazi Germany and before the establishment of the State of Israel, the majority of Jews in Europe were living without clarification of their legal and national statuses. The majority of them were classified as displaced persons, though where they were displaced from and where they ought to be relocated to were points of contention. The official position of the Haganah, as defined by David Ben-Gurion and the Jewish Agency, was that European Jewry had been treated so differently that its members needed to continue to be differently treated. Therefore, in opposition to the policies of quota immigration imposed by the British White Paper, they sought to permit and facilitate unlimited Jewish immigration of Holocaust survivors to Mandate Palestine.

=== Origins ===
The TTG Brigade was created by Israel Carmi, who was an officer of the Jewish Brigade while concurrently acting as a senior representative of the then-underground Haganah. Carmi was initially engaged in revenge operations against those believed to have been responsible, at least in part, for the Shoah. Along with certain of his fellow soldiers in the Jewish Brigade, he was responsible for executing hundreds of Germans, Austrians, and Italians. Most of these were identified by Carmi and his men as having been active members of the SS or otherwise as having assisted in the deportation or extermination of Jews within the Nazi sphere of influence. The number of Nazis they killed is unknown, but may have been as high as 1,500.

The TTG Brigade came into existence when Carmi falsely identified himself at a checkpoint to confuse a sentry and allow him and his companions to have unhindered passage. It led to the creation of fictional paperwork, seals, passes, orders, requisition forms, and even unit uniforms and insignia.

=== Evolution ===
As Carmi's goals shifted from revenge to rescue, so too did the TTG Brigade become more and more an instrument for the liberation of displaced persons and their eventual passage to Palestine. The function of the TTG was first and foremost to provide the illusion of official status before occupying Allied forces. This allowed the members of the brigade to engage in rescue activities without undue interruption or objection from the occupying powers. Purporting to act as if they were under orders as part of the TTG Brigade allowed its members to pass through roadblocks, military checkpoints, and international borders, often with large numbers of displaced Jews in their care.

The second function of the group, which developed over time, was to extract from the Allied forces the greatest quantity of material and personnel assistance for the rescue efforts of the brigade's members. This included the fictional group's requisition and use of civilian and military vehicles, gasoline, rations, medical supplies, and other such materiel. The brigade was also involved, with the assistance of false TTG paperwork, in the acquisition of large quantities of small arms and other martial equipment for use by the Haganah in Palestine.

=== Dissolution ===
The first goal of the group, illegal emigration, became less important as military control of civilian movement became less strict. The group's Zionist goals, centering on illegal immigration to Palestine (Hebrew: הַעְפָּלָה, romanized: haʿappala), became obsolete with the acceptance of the United Nations Partition Plan for Palestine and the international recognition of Israel. As more and more allied forces withdrew from Europe, fewer resources were available for acquisition by the members of TTG. Likewise, as the Palestine war loomed, the military skills they had accumulated encouraged withdrawal of most of them to serve as officers in the newly formed Israel Defense Forces.

Most of the Jews who were rescued in this manner made aliyah to Israel, where they settled in the cities or else became kibbutzniks. Many of these actively supported the war effort during the 1948 Palestine war. The arms and materials stolen by the TTG contributed to the Israeli war effort and warmaking capacity. Most of the members of the TTG Brigade entered service in the Haganah and fought as part of the IDF during the war.

== See also ==
- Displaced persons camps in post–World War II Europe
- Jewish Legion
- Jewish Brigade
- Bricha
- Haganah
- Sh'erit ha-Pletah
- Nakam
- Gmul

== Bibliography ==
- Beckman, Morris (1999). The Jewish Brigade: An Army With Two Masters, 1944-45. Sarpedon Publishers. ISBN 1-885119-56-9.
- Bauer, Yehuda (1970). Flight and Rescue: Brichah. Random House. "Flight and Rescue: Brichah." ASIN B000RJ8XW6
- Blum, Howard (2009). The Brigade: An Epic Story of Vengeance, Salvation, and World War II. Hardscrabble Entertainment. ISBN 978-0-06-093283-1.
- Cohen, Rich (2001). The Avengers: A Jewish War Story. Vintage Books. ISBN 0-375-70529-5.
- Edelheit, Abraham J. (1998). The Yishuv In The Shadow Of The Holocaust: Zionist Politics And Rescue Aliya, 1933-1939. Westview Press. ISBN 0-8133-3643-0.
- Kimche, Jon; Kimche, David (1995). The Secret Roads: the "Illegal" Migration of a People, 1938 to 1948. Secker &Warburg. ISBN 9780883553299. ASIN B0000CJ1UD
- Mankowitz, Zeev W. (2002). Life Between Memory and Hope: The Survivors of the Holocaust in Occupied Germany. Cambridge University Press. ISBN 0-521-03756-5.
- Stone, I. F. (1970). Underground to Palestine. Random House. ISBN 0-394-73620-6.
- Wyman, Mark (1998). DPs: Europe's Displaced Persons, 1945-1951. Cornell University Press. ISBN 0-8014-8542-8.
