= Shraga Har-Gil =

Journalist (1926–2009)

- שרגא הר-גיל
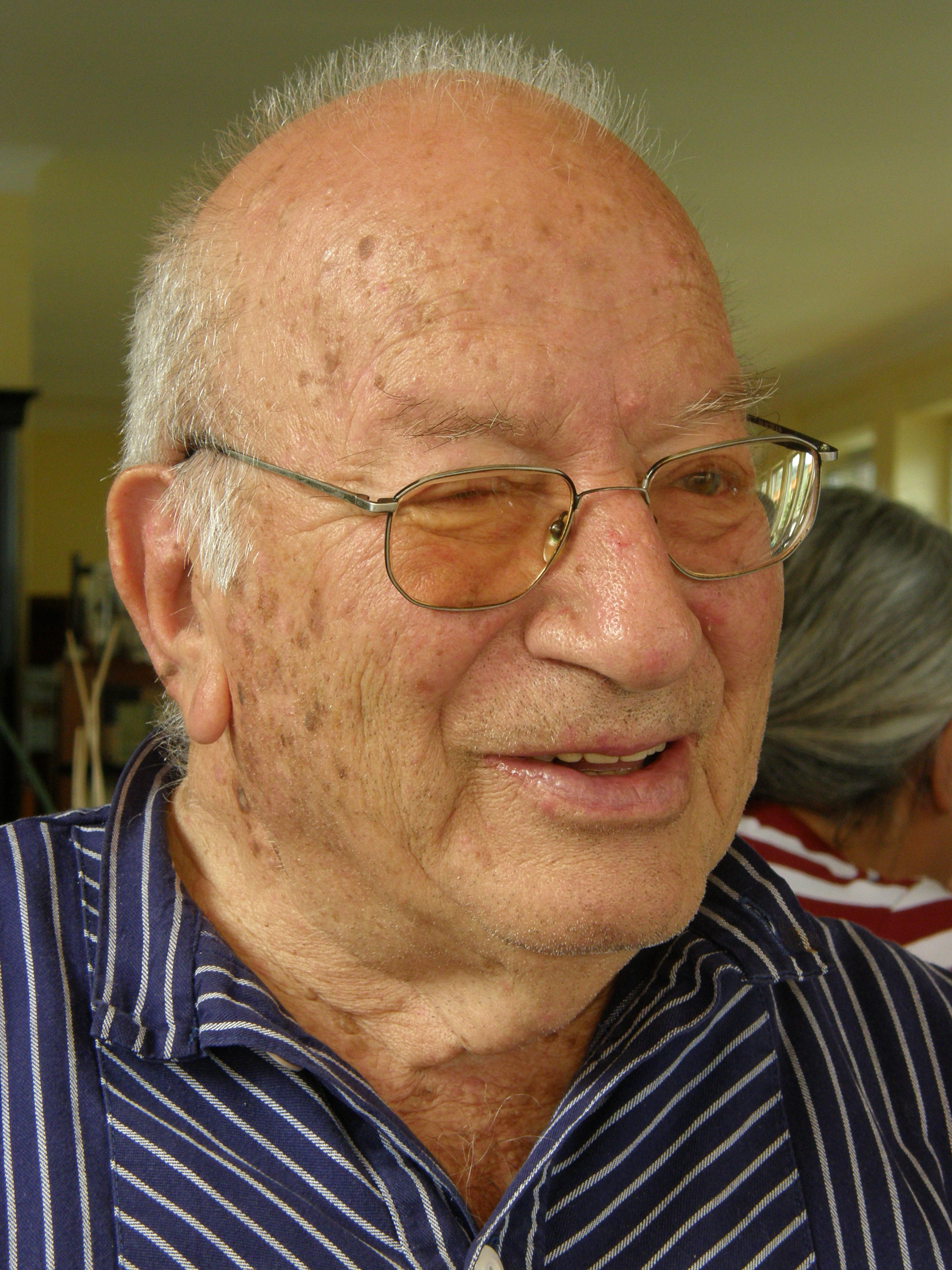
- Har-Gil, 2009
- Born: Paul-Philipp Freudenberger; 19 September 1926; Würzburg, Germany
- Died: 20 September 2009 (aged 83); Würzburg, Germany
- Occupations: Journalist, writer
- Known for: Chief correspondent for Maariv, Middle East correspondent for various German, Austrian, and Luxembourg newspapers
- Partner: Ulla Gessner
- Children: Amir Har-Gil
- Awards: Nominated for Würzburg Peace Prize (2009)

Shraga Har-Gil (Hebrew: שרגא הר-גיל, born Paul-Philipp Freudenberger; 19 September 1926, in Würzburg – 20 September 2009, in Würzburg) was a German-Israeli journalist, Middle East correspondent and a writer. He Hebraized his name to Har-Gil (Mount of Joy) in 1949.

== Life ==
Har-Gil was the second son of a real estate agent whose family lived in Germany for centuries. His mother was an Orthodox Jew, his father a Social Democrat. In 1935 the whole family fled the Gestapo and escaped to Mandatory Palestine. During the Second World War he joined the British Army and fought in the Jewish Brigade. He fought in the Israel Defense Forces during the 1948 Arab-Israeli War, during which he was severely wounded and left permanently handicapped. However, this did not hinder him in attaining prominence in his literary career both as a journalist and an author of short stories.

He was the chief correspondent for the then-biggest Israeli newspaper Maariv for twenty years and subsequently became Middle East correspondent for German, Austrian and a Luxemburg newspapers. Time and again he focused upon the problem of the Middle East conflict and the difficult way towards peace. "There is no peace because there is no confidence". He never stopped advocating for dialogue even with the Hamas: "You have to negotiate with enemies not with friends."

In his next career he set out to establish himself as a literary writer with an emphasis on Judaica and Israel. In this capacity he made many lecture tours throughout Germany. He was invited repeatedly to lecture in Germany at the Jewish Culture-Festival in the Rhineland.

In 2009 Har-Gil was nominated for the Würzburg Peace Prize. He should be honored, because he, whose whole life first in Germany, then in Mandatory Palestine and Israel, was imprinted with the effects of anti-Semitism, hatred and wars, in spite of all he said: "I don't hate!" and he continued: "War is no solution, never!"

From 1999 Har-Gil and his German life partner Ulla Gessner, who became his co-author, lived together in Tel Aviv.

== Books (selection) ==
- Auserwählt und trotzdem heiter. Witze aus Israel, 1970 (hg. mit Uri Sela)
- Alte Liebe rostet nie, Erzählungen aus Würzburg als die Nazizeit begann, 2004 (Vorwort H. Steidle)
- Der schöne Busen der Nachbarin. Geschichten aus 50 Jahren Israel, 2006 (Vorwort P. Pagel)
- Täubele, mein geliebtes Täubele. Jüdische Geschichten, 2008
- Ein Witz geht um die Welt, in: Jüdischer Almanach "Humor" 2004 (Hg. Gisela Dachs)
- Onkel Schlomo – ein ungewöhnlicher Jecke, ebd. "Die Jeckes" 2005

== Movie ==
- Die Kunst des Überlebens. Documentation about Har-Gil's life and love from Amir Har-Gil (son), 52 min. Israel 2003, Germany WDR 3 (Red. Felix Kuballa) 9. July 2004 (first broadcast)
