= Mordechai Gichon =

Israeli archaeologist and military historian (1922–2016)

Mordechai Gichon (Hebrew: מרדכי גיחון; born August 16, 1922; died September 19, 2016) was an Israeli non-fiction author and military historian.

== Early life and military career ==
Gichon was born Mordechai Gicherman in Berlin, Germany, to a Jewish family. In 1934, the family moved to Mandatory Palestine and settled in Tel Aviv, where his father Nachum ran a German-language newspaper. Gichon was educated at the Ben-Yehuda Gymnasium, and later at the Hebrew University of Jerusalem.

In 1940, he joined the Haganah, and in 1942, he enlisted in the British Army to fight in World War II. He saw action in Europe with the Jewish Brigade. Following the war, Gichon became one of the Nakam, who hunted down and killed former Nazis, and was among the Jewish Brigade veterans who organized Aliyah Bet, or illegal immigration of Holocaust survivors to Palestine. Gichon was placed in charge of an assembly point in the Netherlands from where Holocaust survivors were sought out and helped in their journey to Palestine. He was discharged from the British Army in 1946, and returned to Palestine, where he resumed his studies at the Hebrew University of Jerusalem.

In 1947, he rejoined the Haganah and served as an intelligence officer in the Jerusalem area during the 1947–48 Civil War in Mandatory Palestine. During the 1948 Arab-Israeli War, Gichon served in the newly created Israel Defense Forces, and established military intelligence units in the Jerusalem area.

Following the war, Gichon remained in the IDF as a career military intelligence officer, and in 1950 he was promoted to the rank of lieutenant colonel. He served in several senior positions, and was involved in the 1956 Sinai Campaign. He retired from the army in 1963. During his military service, he completed a master's degree in 1956.

== Academic career ==
Gichon's academic career began in 1961, during his military service. When Israel Bar was arrested as a Soviet spy, Gichon was asked to take his place as head of the Department of Military History at Tel Aviv University. He served in this position from 1961 to 1965, when he moved to the Department of Classics and began studying archaeology. He completed a PhD in 1969. He wrote his thesis with the guidance of Professor Michael Avi-Yonah. He was appointed an associate professor in 1971 and a professor in 1980. In 1990, he retired from Tel Aviv University as a professor emeritus in archaeology.

== Personal life ==
Gichon married Chava Goldberg (formerly Renate Eva Goldberg), the daughter of physicist and inventor Emanuel Goldberg, in 1948. The couple had three children.

== Books ==
- Battles of the Bible with Chaim Herzog.
- En Boqeq: Ausgraben in einer Oase am Toten Meer
- Palestine from Bethther to Tel Hai
- Sinai as a Border Region in Historic Retrospect
