= Jewish Brigade =

Palestinian Jewish unit of the British Army (1944–1946)

- Insignia of the Jewish Brigade
- Active: 1944–1946
- Country: United Kingdom
- Branch: British Army
- Type: Infantry
- Size: 5,000
- Engagements: Second World War; Italian Campaign

Commanders
- Notable commanders: Ernest Benjamin

The Jewish Infantry Brigade Group, more commonly known as the Jewish Brigade Group or Jewish Brigade, was a military formation of the British Army in the Second World War. It was formed in late 1944 and was recruited primarily among Jews of the Yishuv from Mandatory Palestine. It was mostly commanded by Anglo-Jewish officers. The Jewish Brigade served in the latter stages of the Italian Campaign, taking part in the Spring 1945 offensive in Italy. It was disbanded in 1946.

After the war, some members of the brigade assisted Holocaust survivors to illegally emigrate to Mandatory Palestine as part of Aliyah Bet, in defiance of British restrictions. Other members formed the vigilante groups Gmul and the Tilhas Tizig Gesheften, which assassinated Nazi war criminals.

The training and combat experience provided by the brigade would prove instrumental in building the Israel Defense Forces and fighting the 1948 Arab-Israeli War. Numerous veterans of the brigade went on to serve as senior Israeli military officers.

In 2018, Italy posthumously awarded the brigade's members the Gold Medal of Military Valor for their role in the Italian Campaign, Second World War.

== Background ==
=== Anglo-Zionist relations ===
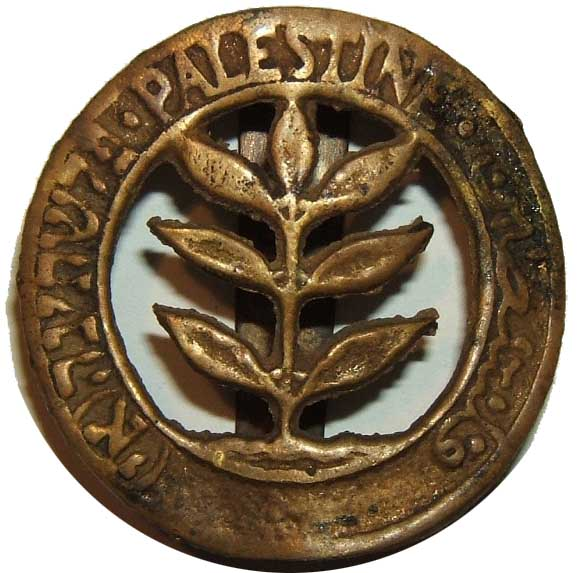
Jewish Brigade pin

Sleeve patch of the brigade

After the First World War, the British Empire replaced the Ottoman Empire as the preeminent power in the Middle East. This change brought closer the Zionist Movement's goal of creating a Jewish state. The Balfour Declaration indicated that the British Government supported the creation of a Jewish homeland in Palestine in principle, marking the first official support for Zionist aims. It led to a surge of Jewish emigration in 1918–1921, known as the "Third Aliyah".

The League of Nations incorporated the Declaration in the British Mandate for Palestine in 1922. Jewish immigration continued through the 1920s and 1930s, and the Jewish population expanded by over 400,000 before the beginning of the Second World War.

In 1939, the British Government of Neville Chamberlain appeared to reject the Balfour Declaration in the White Paper of 1939, abandoning the idea of establishing a Jewish Dominion. When the United Kingdom declared war on Nazi Germany in September 1939, David Ben-Gurion, the head of the Jewish Agency, stated: "We will fight the White Paper as if there is no war, and fight the war as if there is no White Paper."

=== Origins of the Jewish Brigade ===
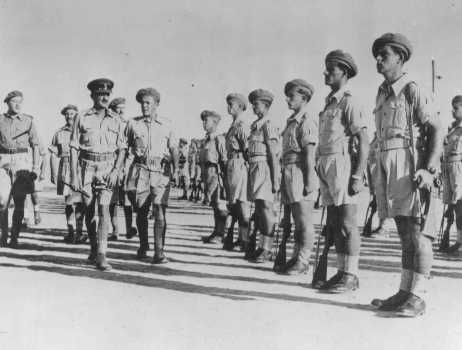
Brigadier Ernest Benjamin, commander of the Jewish Brigade, inspects the 2nd Battalion in Palestine, October 1944.

Chaim Weizmann, the President of the Zionist Organization (ZO), offered the British government full cooperation of the Jewish community in Mandatory Palestine. Initially, the British authorized the enlistment of Palestinian volunteers in the Royal Army Service Corps (RASC) and in the Royal Pioneer Corps, on condition that an equal number of Jews and Arabs was to be accepted. The Jewish Agency promptly scoured the local Labour Exchange offices to recruit enough Arab unemployed as "volunteers" to match the number of Jewish volunteers, and others were recruited from the lower strata of the Arab population, offering cash bounties for enlistment.

The quality of the recruits was, not surprisingly, abysmally low, with a very high desertion rate particularly among the Arab component, so that at the end, most units ended up formed largely by Jews. The volunteers were formed in a RASC muleteers unit and a RASC Port Operating Company, and in the pioneer companies 601 to 609. Of the pioneer companies, all but two were lost in Greece, with most forced to surrender after being unable to evacuate in time. The last two companies were returned to Palestine and disbanded there.

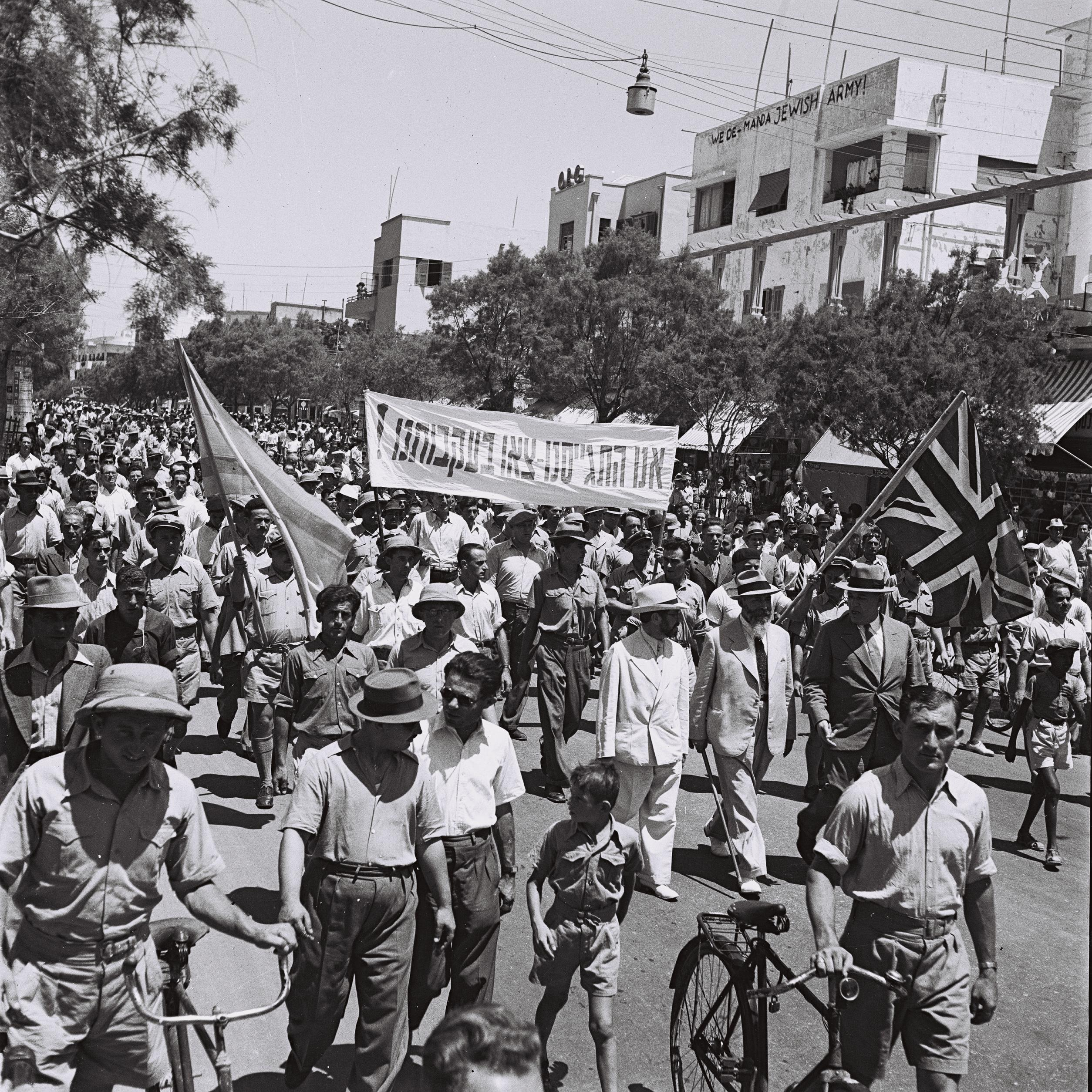
Volunteers marching on Allenby Street in Tel Aviv in favor of enlistment into the British army, 13 July 1940

From 1942, a large number of further Palestinian Arab-Jewish mixed units were formed, with the same mixed ethnic composition and the same quality problems encountered in the Pioneers Companies. These included six RASC (Jewish) Transport Units, a women's Auxiliary Territorial Service and a Woman Territorial Air Force Service, and several auxiliaries in local units of the Royal Army Ordnance Corps, Royal Engineers, and Royal Army Medical Corps. Jewish volunteers were also recruited to serve in coastal artillery batteries defending Palestine. Jewish logistical and engineering personnel from Palestine were deployed in the Battle of France, Invasion of Greece, North African campaign, and in the Italian campaign even before the arrival of the Jewish Brigade. A small number of Jewish personnel from Palestine also served in the Pacific theater. While deployed to do support tasks, some personnel from these units were equipped with weapons and engaged in combat when needed.

The British recruited Jews as commandos in small numbers. In 1940 No. 51 Commando was formed for volunteers from Palestine, composed predominantly of Jewish volunteers with a minority of Arabs as well. The unit fought in East Africa against the Italians. In 1942, the Special Interrogation Group, a commando unit composed primarily of German-speaking Jews from Palestine, was deployed in North Africa. In addition, Jews from Palestine also enlisted in the Royal Air Force, Royal Navy, and British Merchant Navy.

There was no designated all-Jewish, combat-worthy formation. Jewish groups petitioned the British government to create such a force, but the British refused. At that time, the White Paper of 1939 was in effect, limiting Jewish immigration and land purchases. The British authorities initially hesitated to recruit Jews from Palestine into infantry roles.

The core of what would later become the Jewish Brigade was formed when the British began recruiting Jewish volunteers from Palestine into the Royal East Kent Regiment ("the Buffs"), to be used as guards for military facilities including prisoner of war camps in Palestine. The recruits were given training that emphasized discipline but included little live-fire practice. Arab volunteers were recruited into separate companies. In August 1942 the Palestine Regiment was formed. The existing Buffs companies were absorbed into the Palestine Regiment. Recruitment continued, but it was plagued by the same mixed recruiting and its associated low-quality problems. The regiment was derisively called the "Five Piastre Regiments", due to the large number of Arab "volunteers" who had enlisted just for the cash bonus provided by the Jewish Agency. The Palestine Regiment ultimately came to consist of three Jewish and one Arab battalion. It had the role of guard duty in Palestine, Egypt, and Libya. The volunteers, eager for a chance to engage in combat against the Germans, were frustrated with being relegated to guard duty and morale plummeted.

By contrast to the infantry battalions, other units that would later become part of the brigade were formed prior and came with previous experience. In 1940, during the Axis bombing campaign against Mandatory Palestine, the British decided to recruit Jews as anti-aircraft gunners following a particularly deadly Italian air raid against Tel Aviv. In October 1940, the 1st Palestine Light Anti-Aircraft Battery was formed, and it became operational in 1941. The unit defended Palestine from further air attacks and served with British forces elsewhere in the Mediterranean. The 743rd Artisan Works Company of the Royal Engineers was formed in September 1941. It initially served in Palestine, building military bases and fortifications, before providing support to British forces in North Africa. In addition, the 178th General Transport Company of the Royal Army Service Corps, which was formed in February 1941, also served with British forces in North Africa and subsequently Italy. It was also among the first units to widely use Hebrew and Zionist insignia.

From the start of the war, the Jewish Agency had sought to establish a Jewish army to fight alongside the Allies. The first negotiations between Zionist leaders and British officials took place as early as September 1939. From 1940 to 1941, the Zionist leadership requested that a full division composed of Jews from Britain, the dominions, and refugee communities be formed, but this was rejected in October 1941. The Zionist leadership then focused its efforts on the recruitment of Jews in Palestine.

After early reports of the Nazi atrocities of the Holocaust were made public by the Allied powers in the spring and early summer of 1942, British Prime Minister Winston Churchill sent a personal telegram to the US President Franklin D. Roosevelt suggesting that "the Jews... of all races have the right to strike at the Germans as a recognizable body." The president replied five days later saying: "I perceive no objection..."

In February 1944, negotiations between the Jewish Agency and British officials over a Jewish fighting force resumed. British officials opposed creating a large Jewish fighting force, fearing that it would bolster Jewish national claims, provoke Arab opposition, and become the basis for Jewish rebellion against British rule. As a compromise, they proposed forming a brigade group instead of a larger force. Disagreements persisted, especially due to the British considering the deployment of the planned Jewish force to the Far Eastern theatre, which was opposed by the Jewish Agency. Chaim Weizmann bypassed the negotiations and appealed directly to Churchill. Churchill agreed to form a Jewish fighting force, preferring that it be a smaller brigade rather than a full division. He formally recommended the formation of such a brigade and that it be deployed to fight in Italy to the Secretary of State. According to Rafael Medoff, Churchill consented because he was "moved by the slaughter of Hungarian Jewry [and] was hoping to impress American public opinion." On 9 August, the War Cabinet approved Churchill's proposal. On 29 August, Churchill announced the British government's agreement to form a Jewish brigade group to Parliament.

== Jewish Brigade ==
=== Creation ===
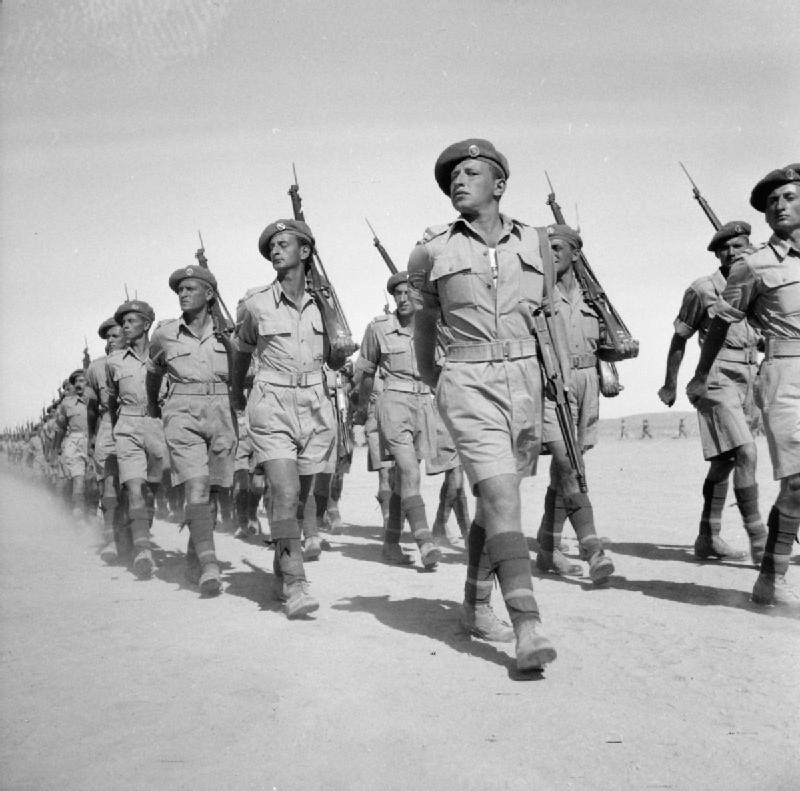
1st Battalion of the Jewish Brigade on parade

On 20 September 1944, an official communique by the War Office announced the formation of the Jewish Brigade Group of the British Army. The Jewish Brigade Group headquarters was established in Egypt at the end of September 1944. The formation was styled a brigade group because of the inclusion under command of an artillery regiment.

The three Jewish battalions of the Palestine Regiment became the brigade's infantry battalions. In addition, veterans of the 1st Palestine Light Anti-Aircraft Battery and Palestinian Jewish soldiers who had served as coastal artillery crews in Palestine became part of the brigade's artillery regiment. The 743rd Artisan Works Company of the Royal Engineers was redesignated as the 643rd Field Engineering Company and became the brigade's combat engineering unit, while the 178th General Transport Company was added to the brigade as its transport unit. Following the announcement of the brigade's formation, recruitment of additional volunteers got underway. Large numbers of young people, particularly recent high school graduates and even schoolboys, volunteered. A Jewish Agency campaign among labor settlement members yielded about 200 volunteers. In addition, the British authorities recruited among Jewish refugees from Europe who were detained in Mauritius after they had tried to enter Palestine in 1940, with 212 joining and another 300 rejected as medically unfit. With recruitment proceeding at an unsatisfactory pace, General Harold Alexander, the commander of the 15th Army Group, warned that if it did not improve he would add 1,000 non-Jewish British soldiers and 33 officers to the brigade, prompting a renewed recruitment campaign. Ultimately, some 2,000 new recruits enlisted between 1944 and 1946, with most joining between September 1944 and February 1945.

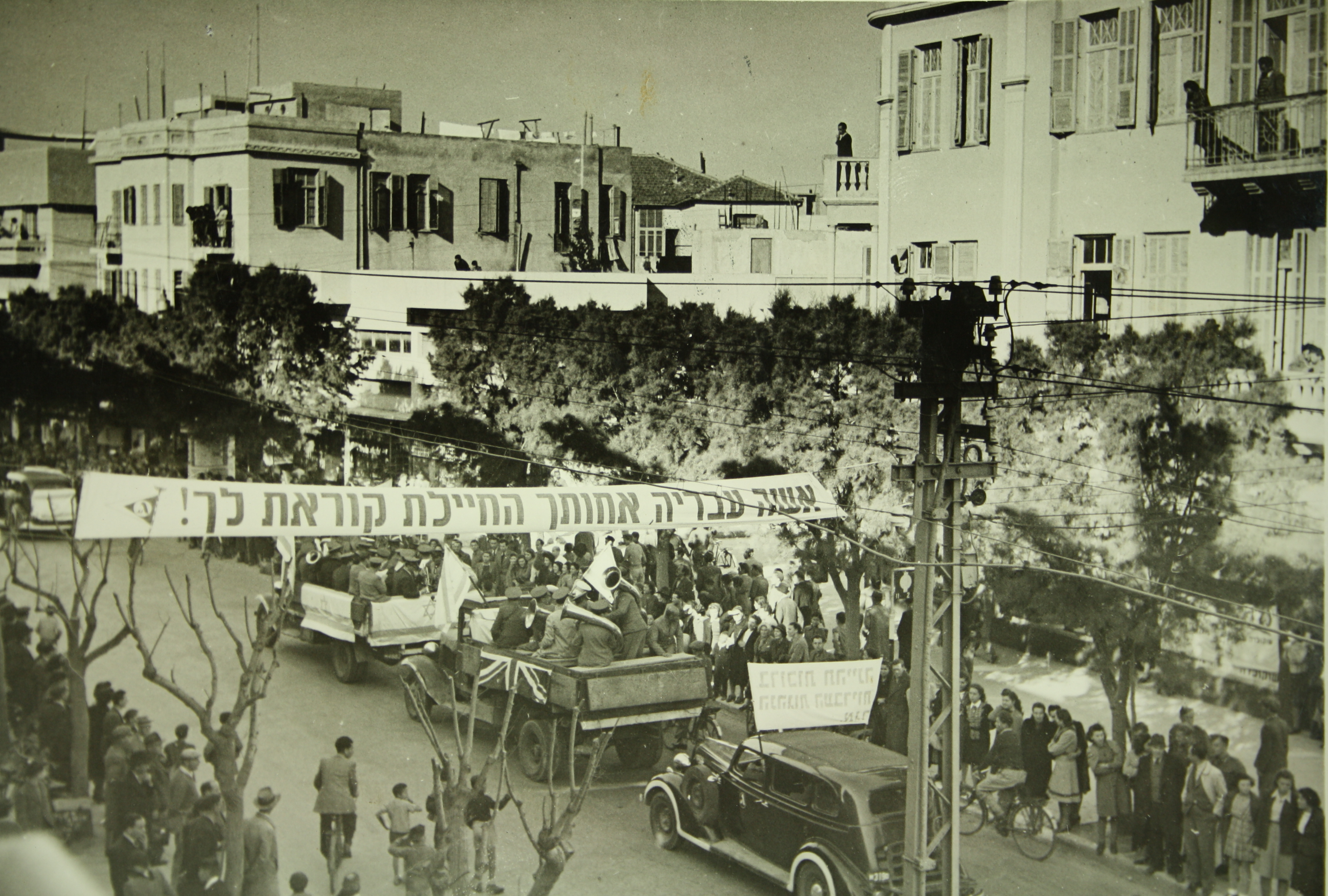
A march in Tel Aviv for recruitment to the British Army during the Second World War

In addition, Jewish and non-Jewish British personnel were transferred to the brigade, including officers and NCOs to lead it. A British Jewish officer, Brigadier Ernest Benjamin, was placed in command of the brigade. He commanded it with the support of several other British Jewish officers. All three battalion commanders were initially British, with two later replaced by Palestinian Jews. The rest of the command structure was mostly Palestinian Jewish, with more Palestinian Jewish officers and NCOs replacing British ones as the brigade matured. An experienced British artillery unit was folded into the brigade's artillery regiment, which would ultimately comprise about 600 Palestinian Jewish and 300 British personnel. The brigade's medical, ordnance field park, signals, REME, and provost units were composed mostly of British non-Jewish personnel.

The Zionist flag was approved as its standard. It included more than 5,000 soldiers organized into three infantry battalions, an artillery regiment, and several supporting units. The Jewish Brigade's composition, consisting of combat and support units, was as follows:

- 1st Battalion, Palestine Regiment
- 2nd Battalion, Palestine Regiment
- 3rd Battalion, Palestine Regiment
- 200th Field Regiment, Royal Artillery
- 643 Field Company, Royal Engineers
- Jewish Brigade Group Postal Section, Royal Engineers
- 178 General Transport Company, RASC
- 140 Field Ambulance, RAMC
- Jewish Brigade Group Ordnance Field Park Section, RAOC
- Jewish Brigade Group Provost Section
- Jewish Infantry Brigade Workshops, REME
- Jewish Brigade Group Light Aid Detachment, REME

The New York Times quoted The Rev. Dr. Israel Goldstein that the British announcement of the creation of a Jewish Brigade "is a belated but nevertheless welcome token of recognition of the Jewish part in the war effort, particularly the contribution of Jewish Palestine." The Manchester Guardian lamented, "The announcement that a Jewish Brigade will fight with the British Army is welcome, if five years late. One regrets that the British Government has been so slow to seize a great opportunity."

Jewish Brigade headquarters under both Union Flag and Zionist flag

In September 1944, the brigade's three infantry battalions were deployed to Egypt and underwent five weeks of intensive training overseen by Brigadier Benjamin. On 31 October 1944, Benjamin declared the battalions to be ready. The brigade was then deployed to Italy, where it joined the British Eighth Army, which was engaged in the Italian campaign under the 15th Army Group. The brigade landed in Taranto, Italy, in November 1944, where its infantry battalions underwent additional training until February 1945 and was assigned to the 10th Corps of the British VIII Army under the command of General Richard McCreery. The brigade's artillery regiment trained separately, with training lasting from November 1944 to March 1945. It would join the rest of the brigade in March after the infantry battalions had already seen combat. The brigade's engineering company, which up to that point had engaged in construction works behind the lines, was sent to Italy in September 1944, absorbed additional soldiers from other Palestinian Jewish engineering units in Italy, and underwent a few months of training as a combat engineering field company. On 8 February, Brigadier Benjamin met with senior Jewish Agency official Moshe Sharett and confirmed that the brigade was nearly ready for combat, although he expressed concern that two-thirds of the brigade's officers lacked combat experience.

=== Military engagements ===
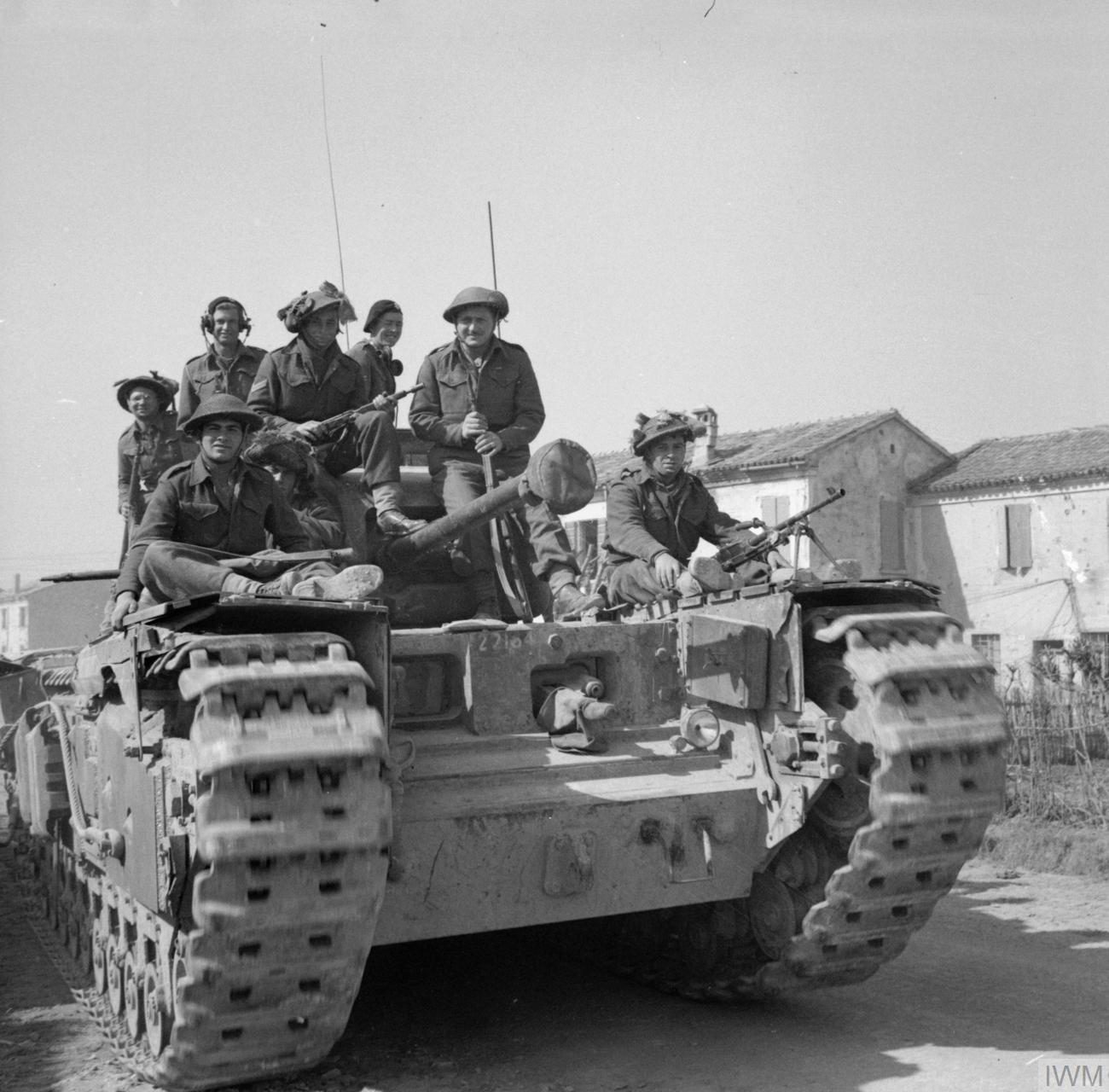
Men of the Jewish Brigade ride on a Churchill tank in the Mezzano-Alfonsine sector, 14 March 1945.

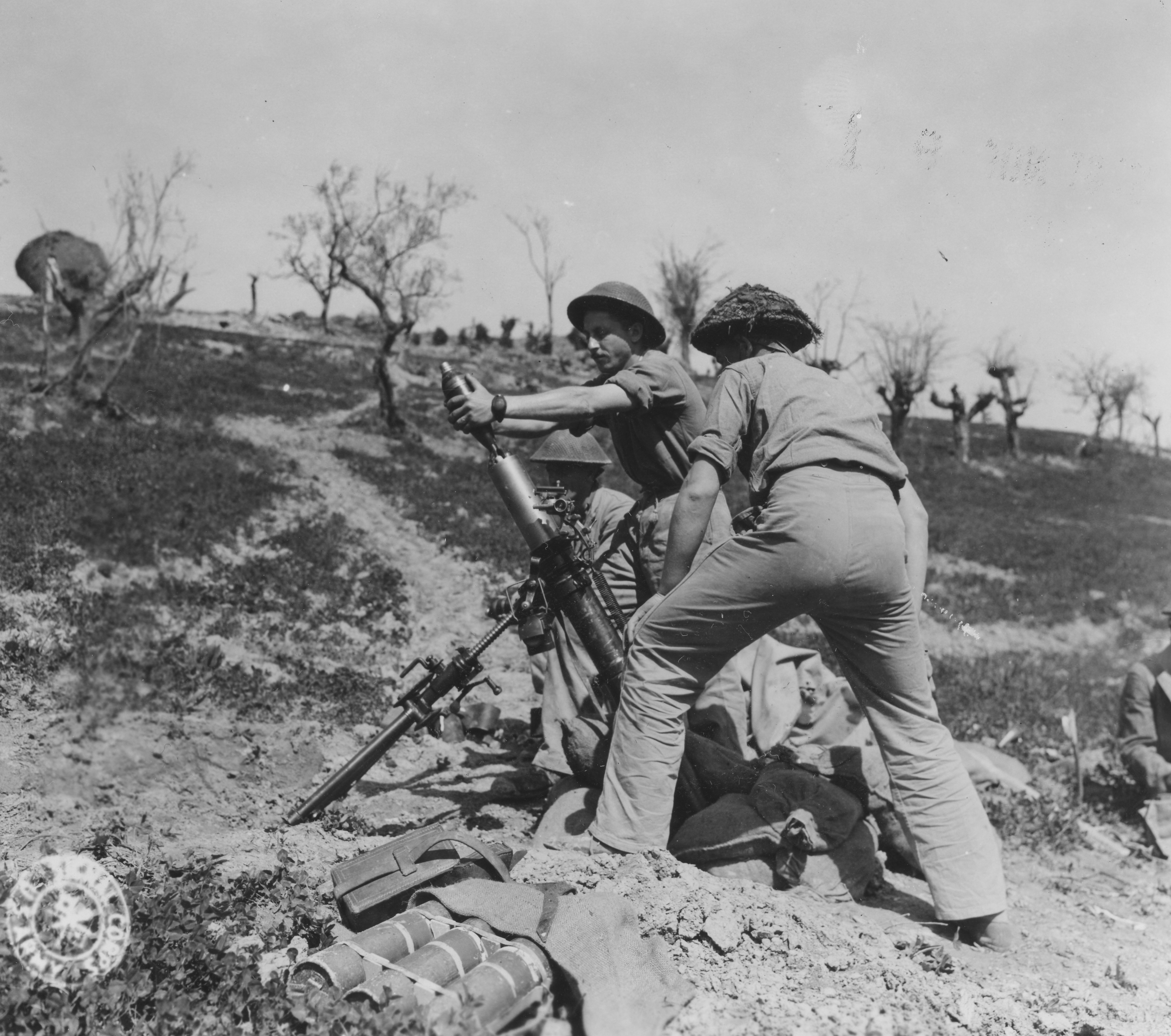
A Jewish Brigade mortar team in action, 30 March 1945.

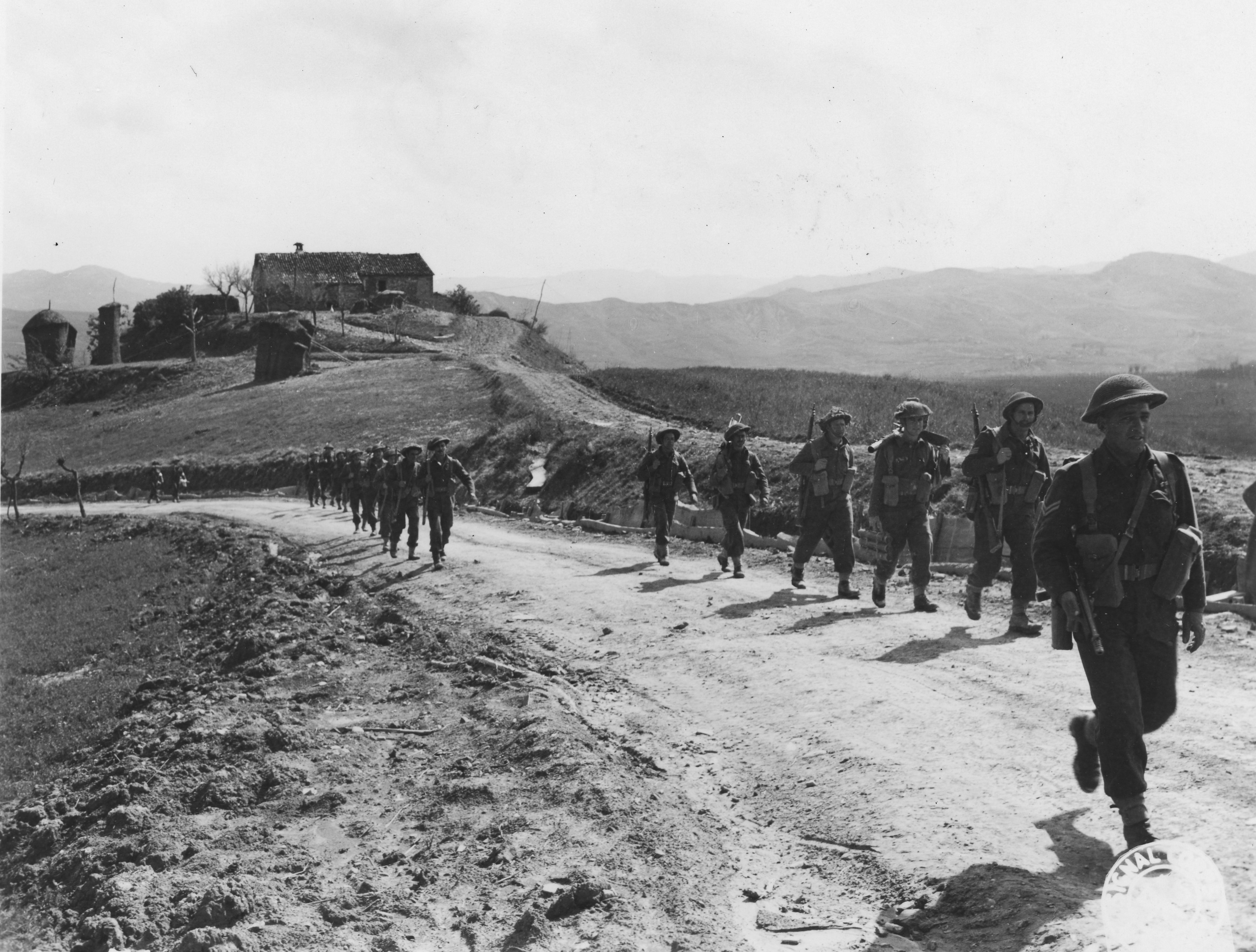
Jewish Brigade soldiers moving to take positions in the Brisighella sector, 24 March 1945.

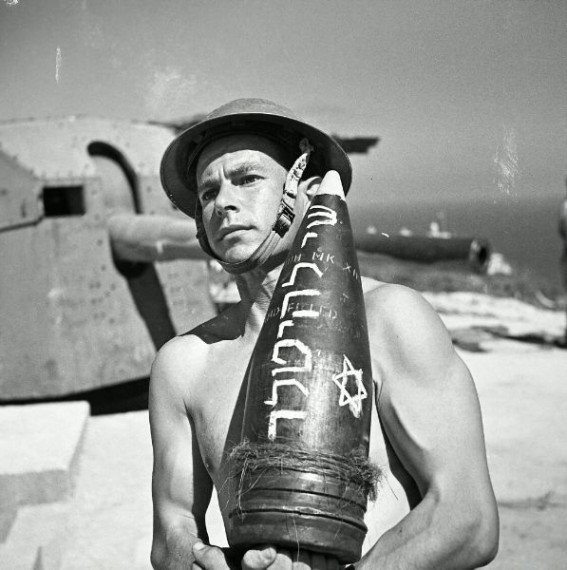
Joseph Wald, a Jewish Brigade soldier, carries an artillery shell. The Hebrew inscription on the shell translates as "A gift to Hitler."

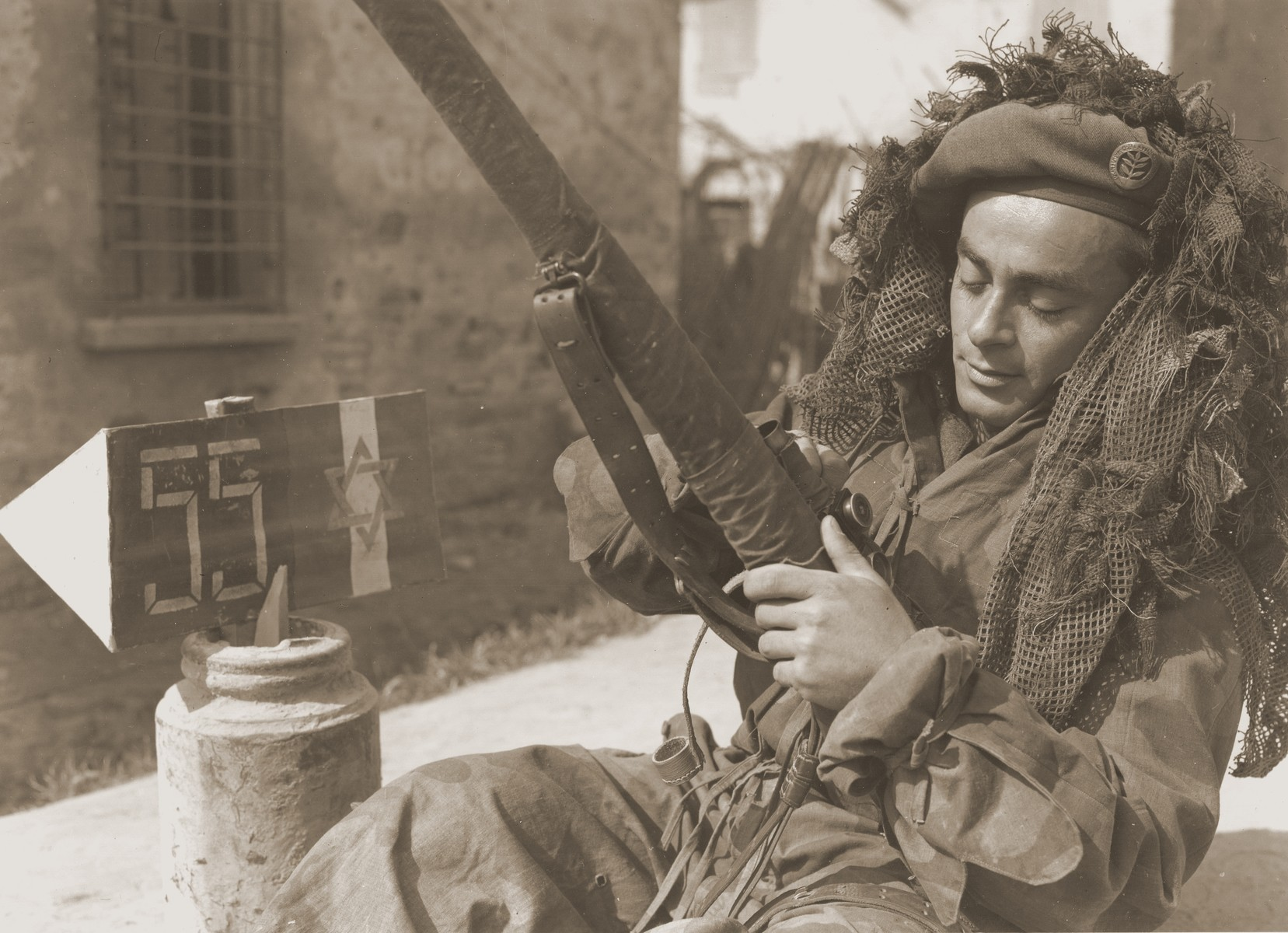
A Jewish Brigade sniper, Lance Corporal Jacob Feinbuch, prepares his rifle for action.

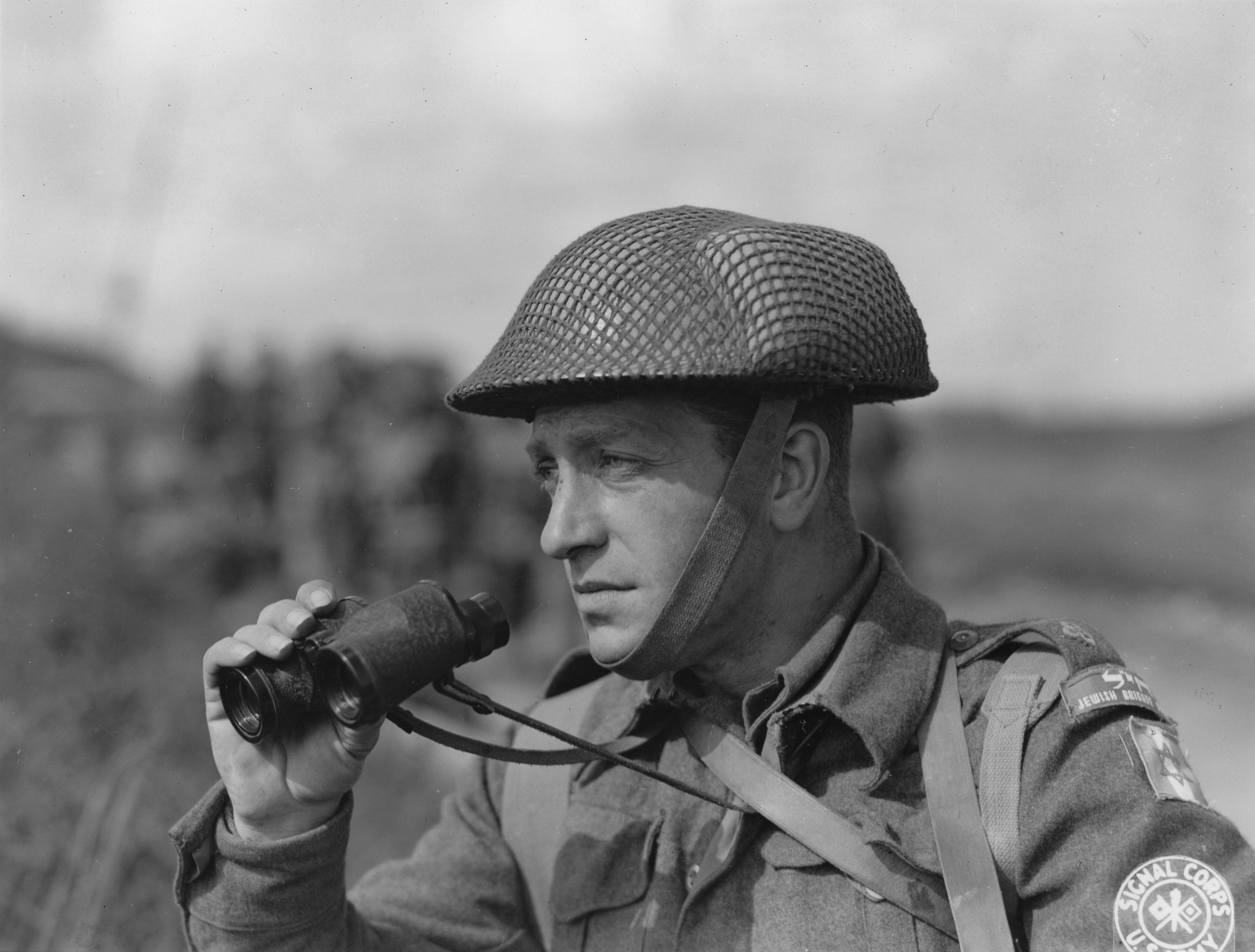
A platoon commander in the Jewish Brigade, Lieutenant Max Winer, pictured on 28 March 1945.

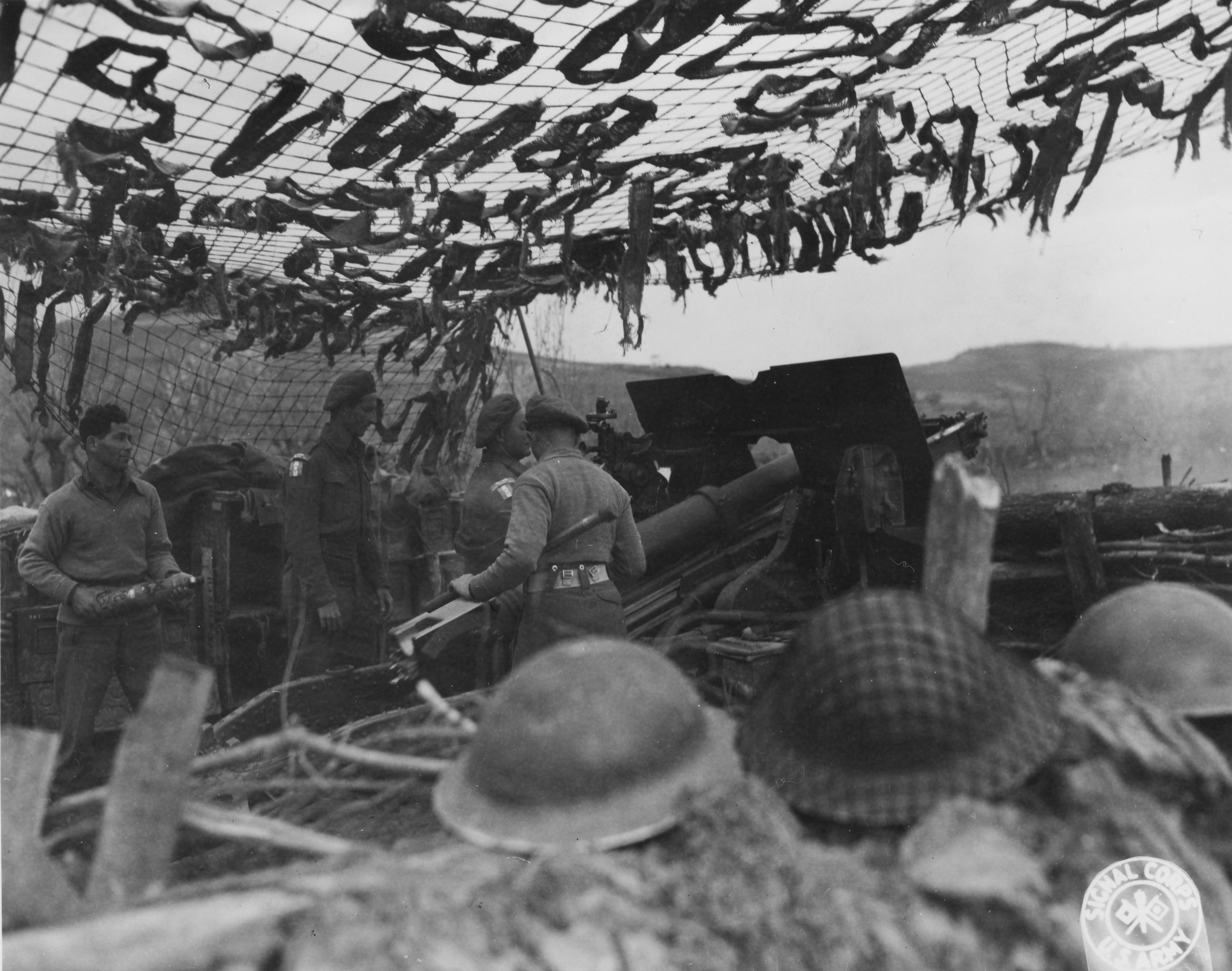
Jewish Brigade artillery in action, 28 March 1945.

The Jewish Brigade was initially incorporated into the British Eighth Army under the British Army's 5th Corps, which was part of the Allied 15th Army Group. It was first attached to the 8th Indian Division and was deployed facing the Gothic Line. It took positions on the front line for the first time on 3 March 1945 along the south bank of the Senio River in the Mezzano-Alfonsine sector, between Alfonsine and Ravenna, replacing the British 2nd Armoured Brigade. The German forces it faced were elements of the 362nd Infantry Division and 42nd Jäger Division. It immediately began engaging in patrol actions, including nightly reconnaissance patrols sometimes done jointly with the North Irish Horse, and repeatedly clashed with German troops. The brigade's first patrol action, during which a German soldier was killed, was led by a former refugee from Germany. In addition to patrol clashes, the opposing sides fired at each other from their positions, and the area was also heavily mined which resulted in a number of injuries to brigade soldiers. On 15 March, brigade soldiers carried out a successful ambush, killing eight German soldiers. On the following day they captured an additional eight prisoners. By 17 March, all three of the brigade's infantry battalions had taken casualties.

The brigade first entered into large-scale combat operations at Alfonsine on 19 March. Its first large-scale combat action was an advance on La Giorgetta. Preparations for attacking it had been underway since 16 March when Lieutenant Yohanan Peltz had discovered German artillery on high ground in the area overlooking the Allied flank, and subsequently conducted patrols to map out the area and clear a path for tanks. On 17 March his patrol had been pinned down by artillery fire for two hours before withdrawing under cover of a smokescreen. On 19 March, after Allied intelligence suggested a possible German withdrawal, four patrols advanced. Two patrols failed after running into heavy fire and a minefield, losing six killed. The other two captured three German positions, killed about 30 German soldiers, and took 12 prisoners, with one prisoner killed by German machine gun fire during the withdrawal.

On the following day, an assault was launched on La Giorgetta through a cleared corridor in a minefield. Lieutenant Yohanan Peltz led 96 soldiers supported by three Churchill tanks of the North Irish Horse. With one group suppressing enemy fire, Peltz led another group in a bayonet charge on the German command center, which was located in a farmhouse, capturing it within minutes and securing La Giorgetta at the cost of 3 killed and 6 wounded. On the same night, the brigade repelled a determined counterattack at the cost of 3 wounded. The brigade advanced in tandem with nearby Indian troops and with armored, artillery, and air support. Many of the airmen flying in support of the brigade were South African Jews, and the planes flew in a Star of David formation as a tribute to the brigade.

Small-scale action persisted afterward, with a brigade soldier killed on 21 March and three German prisoners captured the following day. This marked the end of operations in the Mezzano-Alfonsine sector. On 22 March, the brigade withdrew from the sector and was replaced by the Cremona Combat Group of the Italian Co-belligerent Army.

The brigade was subsequently transferred to the British 10th Corps and deployed to the Brisighella sector near Faenza, replacing the 43rd Independent Gurkha Infantry Brigade. It was to operate as a support unit to the Italian Co-belligerent Army's Friuli Combat Group, which was positioned to the east of the brigade. To the west the brigade was flanked by Free Polish divisions. All brigade combat units were in place by 27 March. Facing them were the 11th and 12th Regiments of the German 4th Parachute Division, which was commanded by Generalleutnant Heinrich Trettner.

The brigade's forces immediately began engaging in small-scale actions with German paratroopers. Both sides sent out probing patrols which sometimes clashed. The two sides also engaged in intermittent artillery and mortar exchanges. On 28 March a brigade patrol clashed with enemy troops and lost one killed. On the following day, brigade soldiers on a reconnaissance mission clashed with enemy forces. Six German paratroopers were killed while the brigade lost one killed and two wounded. On the same day, mortar fire against the brigade's positions killed another two soldiers and wounded fifteen. On 30 March, another brigade patrol clashed with German soldiers and inflicted casualties on them while losing one soldier killed and two wounded. From 31 March to 1 April, the brigade engaged in heavy fighting, succeeding in establishing an outpost on a hill overlooking the Senio River while losing four killed, thirteen wounded, and one missing. Brigade soldiers subsequently captured Fugnana and Plicotto to secure their sector. The Germans suffered casualties in turn, with enemy casualties observed being removed by ambulance.

During this period, a patrol led by Lieutenant Antony Van Gelder sent out to find enemy prisoners for intelligence managed to capture fourteen German soldiers found sleeping in a bunker. Until 10 April, the front was relatively quiet, with the brigade engaging in some small-scale actions and taking some prisoners. On 6 April, an internal explosion took place in a building being used as an outpost, killing five brigade soldiers including Lieutenant Van Gelder. On the following day, the brigade lost one killed and eight wounded in patrol clashes.

On 10 April, the brigade returned to offensive operations, participating in an assault across the Senio River as part of the "Three Rivers Battle" of the Spring 1945 offensive in Italy. The assault was preceded by heavy artillery bombardment and aerial bombing, with the brigade's heavy mortars and Bren guns also firing to soften up enemy positions in its sector. With smoke grenades providing cover, brigade soldiers crossed the river on pontoon bridges laid by engineers and took positions, with a company led by Uri Shay supported by the 643rd (Palestine) Field Company (engineering company) reaching the Fantaguzzi Mill and fortifying itself there. Brigade forces subsequently expanded the bridgehead. They met minimal resistance as the Germans had largely retreated.

Subsequently, brigade forces advanced toward Monte Ghebbio on 11 April and were delayed at Cuffiano by strong resistance. Brigade soldiers managed to wipe out German squads hidden in houses and the Germans began withdrawing by nightfall. The fighting cost the brigade three killed and twenty wounded. Subsequently, the brigade unit linked up with the Friuli Combat Group. Meanwhile, the Germans launched several counterattacks against the brigade position at the Fantaguzzi Mill, which began shortly after midnight. Brigade soldiers managed to hold the enemy off throughout the night with artillery support. At dawn reinforcements arrived. By midday the fighting had ended with the mill remaining in brigade hands.

On 12 April, the brigade was assigned a series of objectives. It was ordered to support the Free Polish forces to its right and the Italian Co-belligerent Army's Foglore Combat Group to its left. Continuing their advance, brigade units met varying levels of resistance. The advance on Monte Ghebbio resumed, supported by artillery, armor, and combat engineers. The assault on the mountain itself was carried out by a company led by Major Maksim Kahan, who led his troops up the mountain facing sniper and mortar fire as well as minefields. Close to the summit, Kahan called in an artillery barrage and then split his force into two assault teams, which advanced with bayonets fixed and drove the German paratroopers from their positions. The assault on Mount Ghebbio cost the brigade three killed and eight wounded.

In their subsequent advances, brigade forces captured Mount Querzola, linked up with Free Polish forces to their right flank, and pushed toward Imola, which was liberated by Polish forces before their arrival. On 13 April the brigade lost two killed and ten wounded in combat around La Torre. Other units met minimal to no resistance. The brigade's 2nd and 3rd battalions were subsequently pulled back south of the Senio River and on 15 April, the 1st battalion was pulled back as well. The soldiers were initially told that the pause was temporary but this in fact marked the end of their combat operations in World War II. The Jewish Brigade's three infantry battalions had spent 48 days on the frontline in Italy - 3 March to 20 April 1945.

Although the infantry battalions were pulled out of action on 15 April, the brigade's support forces such as the artillery, signals, and engineering units, continued to take part in the Allied advance. As the Allies advanced on Bologna, the brigade was ordered to take command of a sector in the Monte Grande area north of San Clemente, which overlooked Bologna and was at the junction of the US Fifth Army and British Eighth Army. The brigade's headquarters took a newly formed improvised unit called MAC GP Force under its command, which comprised six British and Indian battalions. It included British light anti-aircraft guns, the only British mountain artillery in Italy, assorted logistical and engineering forces, and the Jewish Brigade's signals unit. This force replaced the 10th Indian Division, which was ordered to support the Polish advance on Bologna. The sector initially fell under the command of the British 13th Corps before being transferred to the British 10th Corps. MAC GP Force engaged in artillery exchanges with the Germans. After the Indian battalions began their advance on 20 April, MAC GP Force was disbanded. Jewish Brigade headquarters and its signals unit were then pulled from the front line.

The Jewish Brigade's artillery unit, the 200th Field Regiment, remained active on the front line, supporting the Italian forces of the Friuli Combat Group. On 13 April, it took new positions and resumed firing three days later as the Germans retreated. It was subsequently ordered to advance to new positions and support the Polish advance on Bologna. The regiment provided fire support to the Polish forces from Castel San Pietro Terme and came under attack by enemy aircraft. On 22 April, it returned to Faenza. An engineering company which had remained north of the Senio on guard duty and had been intended as an addition to MAC GP Force before it was disbanded was also tasked with dismantling bailey bridges behind the front line before advancing north. It did not see further combat. On 17 April, machine gun companies from the infantry battalions were redeployed to secure bridges along the Po River and cover engineering units working on them. From mid-April the brigade's RASC company also worked under the 10th Corps' confiscation officer to manage captured German equipment. On 25 April, the British 10th Corps formally ended its participation in combat operations in Italy. Some brigade support personnel continued to be active for a while after, with the RASC company later temporarily separating from the Jewish Brigade to oversee transport operations in the Eighth Army's sector and the signals unit being reassigned to British 5th Corps to manage traffic along supply routes on 25 April before rejoining the rest of the brigade in May.

The commander of the British 10th Corps praised the Jewish Brigade's performance:

The Jewish Brigade fought well and its men were eager to make contact with the enemy by any means available to them. Their staff work, their commands and their assessments were good. If they get enough help they certainly deserve to be part of any field force whatsoever.

Based on interviews with brigade veterans, Morris Beckman wrote that brigade members may have summarily executed surrendering German soldiers, particularly SS soldiers, in order to take revenge for the Holocaust, in addition to other abuse such as mock executions. German and Austrian-born brigade soldiers would curse at German prisoners in their own language or ask them whether they knew the fates of their relatives. Samuele Rocca wrote that no executions occurred but that there were symbolic acts of humiliation, such as German prisoners being made to paint the Star of David on vehicles or clean synagogue ruins in Turin. In one incident, after fourteen Germans were captured by a brigade patrol, a soldier urged that they be executed and others mocked the prisoners. A few days later, Brigadier Benjamin issued an order that live prisoners were needed for intelligence gathering and that they must be treated in accordance with the laws of war. Although acknowledging the trauma that many brigade soldiers had suffered, including loss of family in the Holocaust, he warned that revenge would undermine operational goals. However, Benjamin and his staff understood the desire for vengeance among the soldiers, and no Jewish Brigade soldier was ever put on trial for abusing prisoners.

The Jewish Brigade was represented among the liberating Allied units at a papal audience. The Jewish Brigade was then stationed in Tarvisio, near the border triangle of Italy, Yugoslavia, and Austria. They searched for Holocaust survivors, provided survivors with aid, and assisted in their immigration to Palestine. They played a key role in the Berihah's efforts to help Jews escape Europe for British Mandatory Palestine, a role many of its members were to continue after the Brigade disbanded. Among its projects was the education and care of the Selvino children. In July 1945, the Brigade moved to Belgium and the Netherlands.

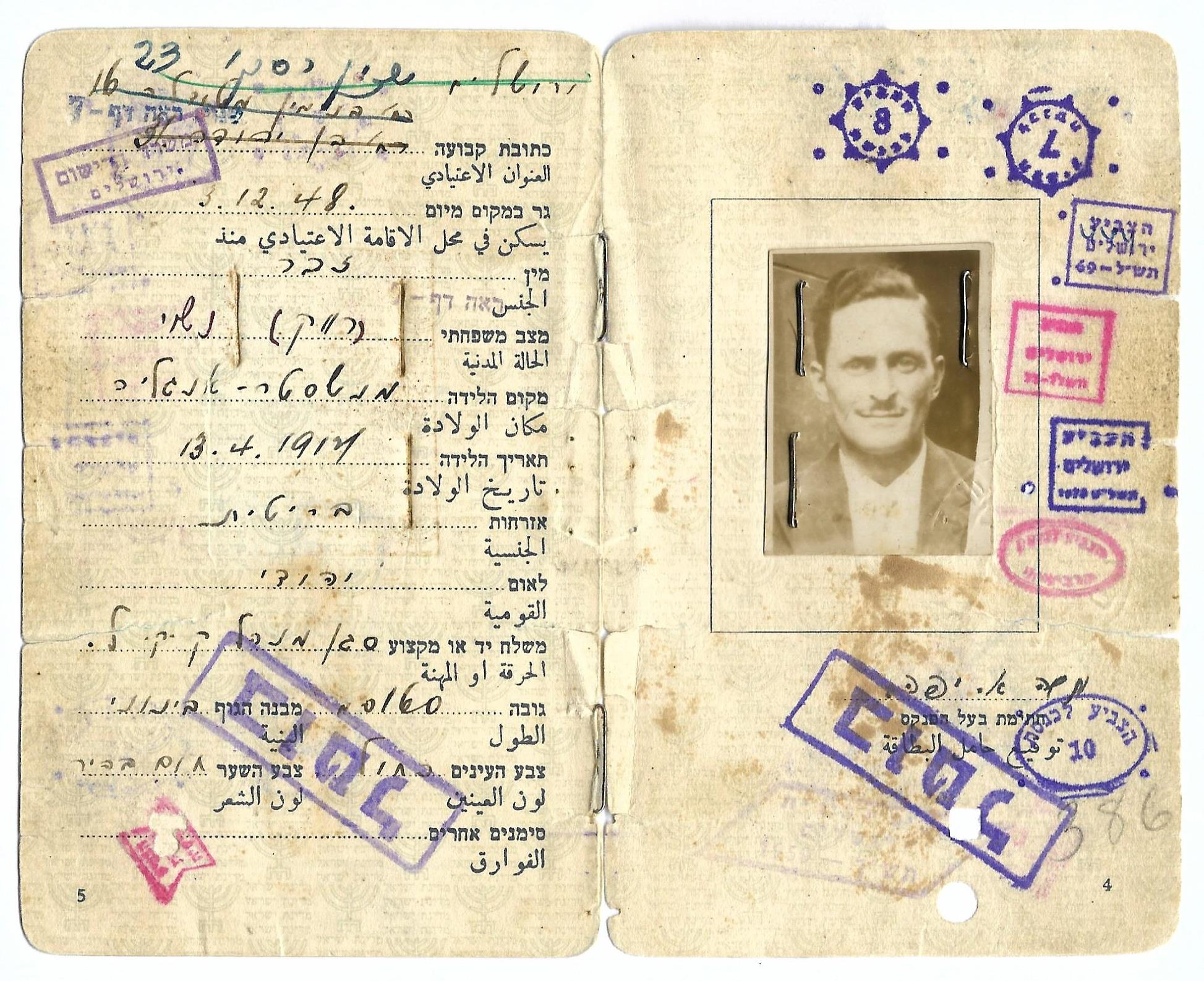
1949 Israeli ID issued to the Brigade's chief Rabbi Maurice Abraham Jaffe.

==== Casualties ====
Sources give different figures on the Jewish Brigade's casualties. Some sources cite the brigade's combat losses as 30 killed and 70 wounded. According to a Haaretz article on the efforts of Yael Driver, the daughter of brigade officer and Israeli general Shlomo Shamir, in tracking down the families of the brigade's fallen, 35 brigade soldiers were killed during its combat operations. Morris Beckman put the brigade's casualties at 83 dead and 200 wounded. Samuele Rocca gave the figure of brigade casualties up to 15 April 1945 as 57 killed, of whom 30 were Palestinian Jews and 27 were British, and 150 wounded. Howard Blum also put the brigade's losses at 57 killed and 150 wounded.

According to a list of the fallen from a book on the brigade by Yaakov Lifshitz, 59 brigade soldiers were lost. In addition to those killed in combat, this figure includes deaths from other causes such as accidents and suicide, as well as one soldier who went missing in action and whose fate remains unknown. The list includes 17 soldiers who died after the end of the war in Europe.

33 of the brigade's dead are buried in the Commonwealth's Ravenna War Cemetery at Piangipane.

== Post-war deployment and disbandment ==
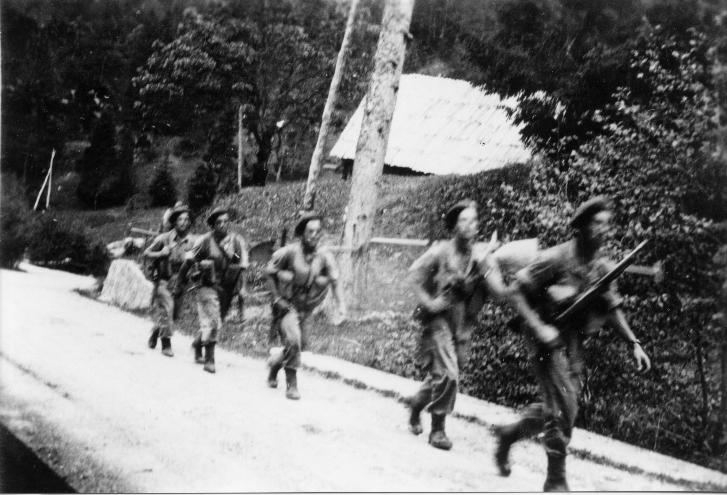
Jewish Brigade soldiers in Tarvisio

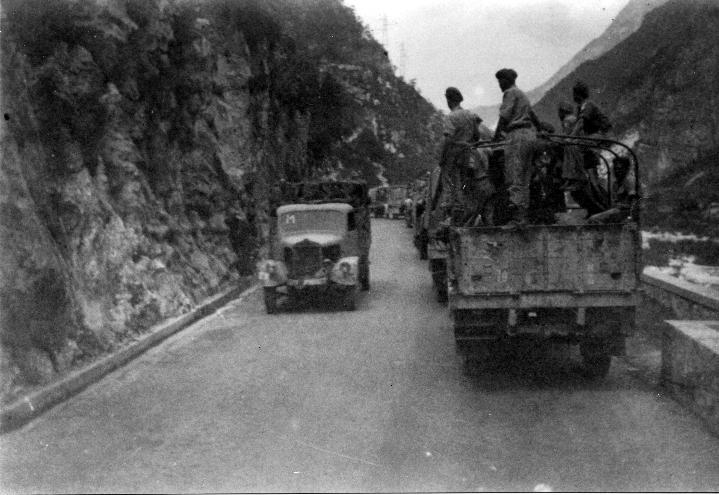
Jewish Brigade troops on the Italian-Austrian border

Tilhas Tizig Gesheften, commonly known by its initials TTG, loosely translated as "kiss [literally, lick] my arse business", was the name of a group of Jewish Brigade members formed immediately following the Second World War. Under the guise of British military activity, this group engaged in the assassinations of Nazis, facilitated the illegal immigration of Holocaust survivors to Mandatory Palestine, and smuggled weaponry to the Haganah.

The Jewish Brigade also joined groups of Holocaust survivors in forming assassination squads known as the Nakam, for the purpose of tracking down and killing former SS and Wehrmacht officers who had participated in atrocities against European Jews. Information regarding the whereabouts of these fugitives was gathered either by torturing imprisoned Nazis or by way of military connections. The British uniforms, military documentation, equipment, and vehicles used by Jewish Brigade veterans greatly contributed to the success of the TTG. With the end of the war in Europe, a secret unit within the Jewish Brigade called Gmul ("Recompense") was formed to hunt Nazis. Working in teams of no more than five men, Gmul operatives generally approached their targets wearing British military police uniforms and told them they were being taken for interrogation before killing them. The operation lasted for three months, during which between 100 and 200 Germans were killed according to some estimated. It ended when the British, hearing complaints about disappearances from German families, understood what had been happening and redeployed the brigade to the Netherlands and Belgium. The Haganah command also issued an order to end the Gmul operations. However, brigade members continued to hunt and kill Nazis, working under the name "Operation Judgement" in secret killing squads. The number of Nazis the TTG killed is unknown. Some estimates place the death toll in the hundreds and up to 1,500. According to Mordechai Gichon, who gathered intelligence on Nazi war criminals to facilitate the killings, the operation was stopped after about 30 executions, as the Jewish leadership in Palestine wanted to focus on facilitating clandestine immigration, telling the soldiers that helping Jews get out of Europe was more important than revenge. There were at least two instances in which brigade veterans were implicated in the assassinations of Jewish Kapos. Kangaroo courts executed two Kapos, one by gunshot and another by drowning him in a river.

Meir Zorea, a Captain in the brigade, and a future Israeli general and politician who had been awarded the Military Cross for his actions in combat, took part in the assassinations. Of his activities, he recalled: "We only eliminated those directly involved in the slaughter of Jews. At first we put a bullet through their heads. Then we strangled them. With our bare hands. We never said anything before we killed them. Not why or who we were. We just killed them like you kill a bug."

According to Israel Carmi, who partook in the operations, the soldiers received information from a Nazi who betrayed known war criminals to brigade soldiers in exchange for them sparing the lives of himself and his wife. After a tip-off, Carmi and two other soldiers confronted the couple at their house in Austria and saw that their home was filled with clothing, jewellery, and other items that the wife admitted had belonged to Jews. After they were threatened with execution, the man agreed to give them a list of SS NCOs and officers. Upon returning the following day, the man had indeed produced a list of identities of war criminals along with their crimes. Most of the names were handed to brigade staff and British intelligence to deal with except for those of the highest ranking SS officers, who the soldiers wanted to deal with personally. After receiving confirmation that the list was accurate, brigade squads dispatched the remaining targets of the list, using the ruse of military police to get them to come with them. Carmi recalled that "usually they came without a struggle. Once in the car we told the prisoner who we were and why we took him. Some admitted guilt. Others kept silent. We did the job."

A brigade soldier who participated in the killings, Ze'ev Keren, who in the future would be a Mossad operative and take part in the capture of Adolf Eichmann, recalled "I strangled them myself once we got in the forest. It took three to four minutes. We weighted the bodies with heavy chains, and threw them into lakes, rivers, streams. They were remote places. We left no trace of our activities."

Shmuel Givon, another brigade soldier who participated, recalled that on a trip to the Austrian Alps, he and his teammates met two SS men and learned that they had been high-ranking Totenkopf officers. After the SS men admitted to having committed crimes against Jews, they were pushed off a cliff.

After assignment to the Eighth Corps District of the British Army of the Rhine (Schleswig-Holstein), the Jewish Brigade was disbanded in the summer of 1946.

=== Involvement in the Bricha ===
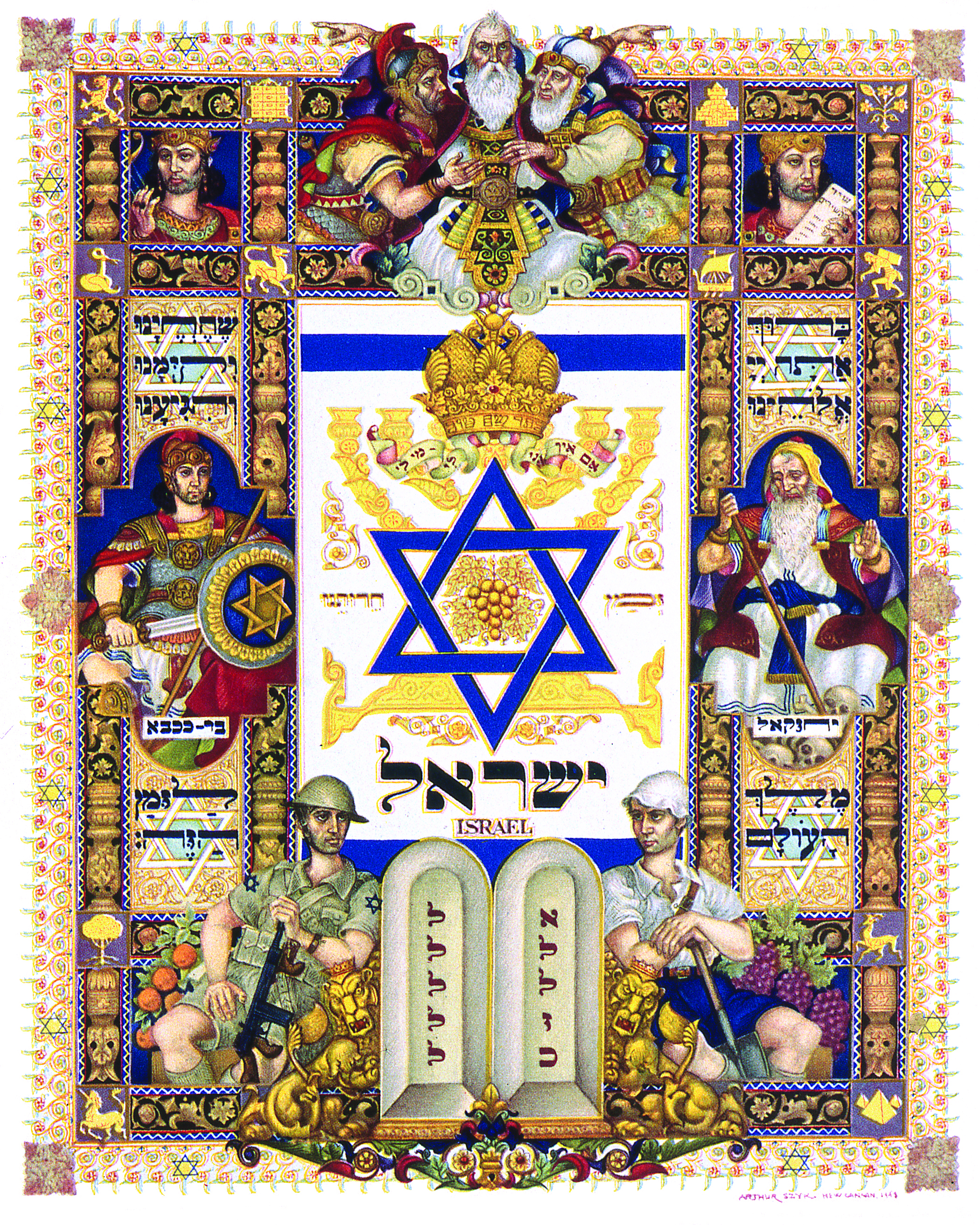
A 1948 art piece by Arthur Szyk celebrating the birth of Israel, showing a soldier of the Jewish Brigade in the lower left

Many members of the Jewish Brigade assisted and encouraged the implementation of the Bricha. In the vital, chaotic months immediately before and after the German surrender, members of the Jewish Brigade supplied British Army uniforms and documents to Jewish civilians who were facilitating the illegal immigration of Holocaust survivors to Mandatory Palestine. The most notable example was Yehuda Arazi, code name "Alon," who had been wanted for two years by the British authorities in Palestine for stealing rifles from the British police and giving them to the Haganah. He and his partner Yitzhak Levy had enlisted in the Jewish Brigade using falsified names.

In 1945, Arazi and his partner Yitzhak Levy travelled from Mandatory Palestine to Egypt by train, dressed as sergeants from the Royal Engineers. From Egypt, the pair travelled through North Africa to Italy and, using false names, joined the Jewish Brigade, where Arazi secretly became responsible for organising illegal immigration. This included purchasing boats, establishing hachsharot, supplying food, and compiling lists of survivors.

When Arazi reached the Jewish Brigade in Tarvisio in June 1945, he informed some of the Haganah members serving in the Brigade that other units had made contact with Jewish survivors. Arazi impressed upon the Brigade their importance in Europe and urged the soldiers to find 5,000 Jewish survivors to bring to Mandatory Palestine. Jewish Brigade officer Aharon Hoter-Yishai recalled that he doubted the existence of 5,000 Jewish survivors. Regardless, the Jewish Brigade accepted Arazi's challenge without question. For many Jewish soldiers, this new mission justified their previous service in the British forces that had preceded the creation of the Jewish Brigade.

Another Jewish Brigade soldier actively involved in the Bricha was Israel Carmi, who was discharged from the Jewish Brigade in the autumn of 1945. After a few months, the Secretariat of Kibbutz HaMeuchad approached Carmi about returning to Europe to assist with the Bricha. Carmi's previous experience working with survivors made him an important asset for the Bricha movement. He returned to Italy in 1946 and attended the 22nd Zionist Congress in Basel, where he gained insight into how the Berihah operated throughout Europe.

Carmi proposed establishing a second Bricha route across Europe in case the existing route collapsed. He proposed dividing the Bricha leadership into parts: Mordechai Surkis, working from Paris, would be responsible for the financial workings. Ephraim Dekel in Prague would run the administrative element, and oversee the Berihah in Poland, Czechoslovakia and Germany. Carmi, working from Prague, would oversee activities in Hungary, Yugoslavia, and Romania.

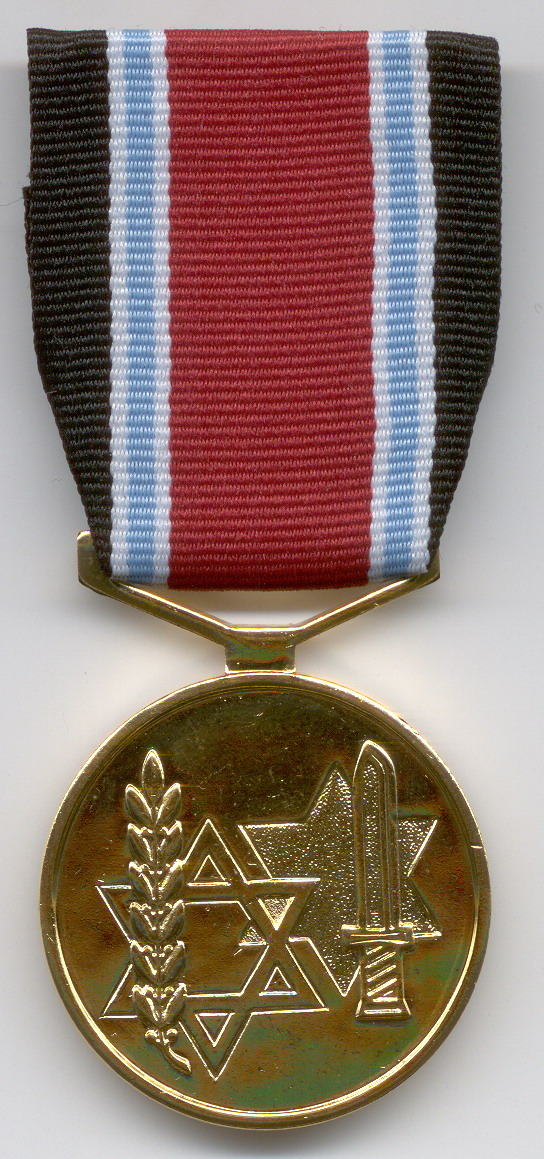
The Fighters against Nazis Medal

Jewish Brigade soldiers, assisting with the Bricha, specifically took advantage of the chaotic situation in post-war Europe to move Holocaust survivors between countries and across borders. Soldiers were intentionally placed by Merkaz Lagolah at transfer points and border crossings to assist the Jewish DPs (displaced persons). For example, Judenberg, a sub-camp of the Mauthausen concentration camp, acted as a Bricha point where Brigade soldiers and partisans worked together to assist DPs. Similarly, in the city of Graz, a Bricha point was centred in a hotel where a legendary Bricha figure, Pinchas Zeitag, also known as Pini the Red or "Gingi," organised transports westwards to Italy.

One of the Jewish Brigade's greatest contributions to the Bricha was the use of their British Army vehicles to transport survivors, up to a thousand people at a time, in truck convoys to Pontebba, the brigade's motor depot. These secret transports generally arrived at 2 or 3 a.m., and the Brigade always ensured that DPs were greeted by a soldier or an officer and welcomed into a dining hall with food and tea. Everyone was given a medical examination, a place to sleep, and clean clothing. Within a few days the group was moved to hachsharot in Bari, Bologna and Modena. After recuperating and completing their hachshara training, the DPs were taken to ports where boats would illegally set sail for Mandatory Palestine. Historians estimate that the Jewish Brigade assisted in the transfer, between 1945 and 1948, of 15,000–22,000 Jewish DPs as part of the Bricha and the illegal immigration movement.

=== Military legacy ===
The Volunteer Ribbon was awarded to members of the Jewish Legion of WW1 and Jewish Brigade of WW2

In 1948, after the Israeli Declaration of Independence, many Jewish Brigade veterans served with distinction in the Israel Defense Forces during the 1948 Arab–Israeli War. Veterans of the brigade brought with them British Army discipline and training as well as combat experience, which proved important in shaping the Israel Defense Forces. Many veterans served as high-ranking officers in the Israeli military, with 35 becoming generals.

== Legacy ==
=== Medals and awards ===
The Italian Gold Medal of Military Valour awarded in 2018 to the warflag of the Jewish Brigade

The IDF's 7th Armored Brigade is considered the heir of the Jewish Brigade

Among the brigade's soldiers, 78 were mentioned in dispatches, and 20 received military decorations (7 Military Medals, 7 Order of the British Empire medals, 4 Military Crosses, and 2 US awards). Veterans of the Brigade were later entitled to the Volunteer Ribbon and the Fighters against Nazis Medal of the State of Israel.

In October 2018, after a unanimous support vote by the Italian Parliament, the war flag of the Jewish Brigade Group was awarded the Italian "Medaglia d'Oro al Valor Militare" for its contribution to the liberation of Italy during World War II. The medal was attached to the warflag of the Israeli 7th Armored Brigade, heirs of the Jewish Brigade Group, in a celebration at the Bet Hagdudim (Battalions Museum) in Avihayil.

=== Legacy ===
The Jewish Brigade inspired numerous memoires, books and films. In 1998, filmmakers Chuck Olin (Director) and Matthew Palm (co-producer) released their award-winning documentary, In Our Own Hands. The film aired on PBS in the United States and played in numerous film festivals around the world.

=== In popular culture ===
In Leon Uris novel Exodus, and the subsequent film, protagonist Ari Ben Canaan of the Haganah succeeds in organising the movement of refugees to Palestine, through his experience of action and use of procedures gained during the war as an officer of the Jewish Brigade.

=== Political controversy in Italy ===
During the 2026 Liberation Day commemoration in Italy (25 Aprile), tensions arose in several Italian cities, especially in Milan, regarding the participation of representatives associated with the Jewish Brigade. The group has been part traditionally represented during this commemoration, since the aftermath of the war.

On April 25th 2026, some pro-Palestinian activist groups and segments of the organizing committees objected to the Brigade’s presence, citing the ongoing conflict in the Middle East and opposing the display of Israeli symbols during the commemoration. In certain instances, this led to restrictions on participation extended to autonomous Jewish citizens, tensions along the procession routes, and reports of the Brigade’s representatives being blocked or asked to withdraw from the marches.

Critics of the exclusions argued that preventing participation risked distorting the historical record of the resistance and the allied war effort in Italy.

== Partial list of notable veterans of the Jewish Brigade ==
British Jews

- Ernest Benjamin, soldier
- Bernard M. Casper, Rabbi
- Edmund Leopold de Rothschild, financier

Palestinian Jews

- Shmuel Agmon, Israeli mathematician
- Yehuda Amichai, Israeli poet and author
- Shimshon Amitsur, Israeli mathematician
- Yehuda Arazi, Israeli military officer and businessman
- Meir Argov, Israeli activist and politician, signer of the Israeli Declaration of Independence
- Ted Arison, Israeli-American businessman
- Yehoshua Bar-Hillel, Israeli philosopher, mathematician, and linguist
- Hanoch Bartov, Israeli author and journalist
- Ephraim Ben-Artzi, Israeli general and businessman
- Haim Ben-Asher, Israeli politician
- Gideon Ben-Yisrael, Israeli politician
- Shmuel Ben-Dror, Israeli association football player
- Yehezkel Braun, Israeli composer
- Zvi Brenner, soldier
- Israel Carmi, founder of Tilhas Tizig Gesheften
- Reuven Dafni, Israeli diplomat
- Yehiel Duvdevani, Israeli politician and senior official in Mekorot
- Michael Evenari, Israeli botanist
- Yisrael Galili (Balashnikov), Israeli weapons designer
- Mordechai Gichon, author and military historian
- Amir Gilboa, Israeli poet
- Elazar Granot, Israeli politician and writer
- Dov Gruner, Irgun fighter
- Shraga Har-Gil, journalist, Middle East correspondent and writer
- Yehoshafat Harkabi, chief of Israeli military intelligence
- Reuven Helman, Israeli athlete
- Ze'ev Herring, Israeli politician
- Aharon Hoter-Yishai, Israeli Military Advocate General
- Yigal Hurvitz, Israeli farmer, businessman and politician
- Hans Jonas, American philosopher
- Maksim Kahan, Israeli Olympic sports shooter
- Haim Laskov, fifth Chief of Staff of the Israel Defense Forces
- Guenter Lewy, author and political scientist
- Mordechai Maklef, third Chief of Staff of the Israel Defense Forces
- Danny Matt, Israeli military officer
- Shimon Mazeh, Israeli military officer, agronomist, and businessman
- Issachar Miron, Israeli-American composer
- Nissan Nativ, Israeli actor and director
- Yitzhak Orpaz, Israeli writer
- David Rubinger, Israeli photojournalist
- Gideon Schocken, Israeli general
- Shlomo Shamir, commander of the Israeli Navy and Israeli Air Force
- Chaim Sheba, Israeli physician and founder of Sheba Medical Center
- Mordechai Surkis, Israeli politician
- Israel Tal, Israeli general and leader of the Merkava tank program
- Adin Talbar, Israeli diplomat and athlete
- Avraham Tamir, Israeli general and statesman
- Moshe Tavor, Israeli Nazi hunter
- Meir Zorea, Israeli general and politician
- Amram Zur, first Travel Ministry commissioner of Israel
- Shalom Zysman, politician

== See also ==
- Fighters against Nazis Medal
- Jewish Legion
- Jewish Parachutists of Mandate Palestine
- Special Interrogation Group (SIG)
- The Sixth Battalion – a documentary about Jewish soldiers forced to fight for the Nazis in the Slovak Republic during the Second World War.
- Tilhas Tizig Gesheften, a paramilitary sister effort undertaken by many members of the brigade
- Volunteer Ribbon

== Sources ==
- Adler, Cyrus; Szold, Henrietta (1946). American Jewish Year Book, Volume 48. American Jewish Committee.
- Beckham, Morris (1999). The Jewish Brigade: An Army With Two Masters, 1944–45. Sarpedon Publishers. ISBN 1-885119-56-9.
- Blum, Howard (2002). The Brigade: An Epic Story of Vengeance, Salvation, and WWII. New York: HarperCollins. ISBN 0-06-019486-3.
- Casper, Bernard M (1947). With the Jewish Brigade. London: Edward Goldston. Contains a foreword by E F Benjamin former commander of the Jewish Brigade. Casper was Senior Chaplain to the Brigade.
- Joslen, H. F. (2003) [1960]. Orders of Battle: Second World War, 1939–1945. Uckfield, East Sussex: Naval and Military Press. ISBN 978-1-84342-474-1.
- Medoff, Rafel (2002). Militant Zionism in America: The Rise and Impact of the Jabotinsky Movement in the United States. University of Alabama Press. ISBN 978-0-8173-1071-4.
- Paraszczuk, Joanna (3 March 2010). "We Proved to the World That We Can Fight; Veterans Attend a Special Showing in Tel Aviv of Chuck Olin's Award-winning Documentary About the Outstanding all-Jewish Brigade that Helped Defeat Hitler". The Jerusalem Post.
- In Our Own Hands: The Hidden Story of the Jewish Brigade in World War II (DVD). Film Resource Center. 1998. Archived from the original on 22 February 2008.
- Rocca, Sam M (2013). The Jewish Brigade Group and the Jewish Units in the British Army in World War II. Italy: Soldiershop Publishing. Archived from the original on 19 September 2013.
- Maj.-Gen. Shamir (Rabinowicz), Shlomo. Divine Intervention and a Jewish Flag in the British Army. Israel (2014). ISBN 978-965-555-748-0. (Private edition in Hebrew). Shamir was the Jewish Brigade Covert Commander on behalf of the Haganah and the Jewish Institutions in Palestine.
- Maj.-Gen. Shamir (Rabinowicz), Shlomo. Dance of the Fire, The Jewish Brigade in WWII, Facts, Myths, Appraisal. UK (2025). ISBN 978-1-917458-31-3. Unicorn Publishing Group. Shamir was the Jewish Brigade Covert Commander on behalf of the Haganah and the Jewish Institutions in Palestine. Introduction by the President of the State of Israel.
