= Maksim Kahan =

Israeli sports shooter

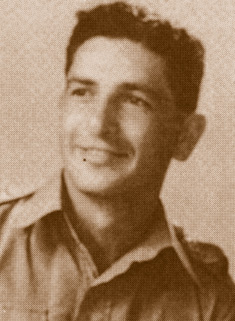
- Kahan in 1948

Personal information
- Native name: מקסים קאהן
- Born: 25 January 1918 South Africa
- Died: 18 May 2006 (aged 88)

Sport
- Sport: Sports shooting

Maksim Kahan (Hebrew: מקסים קאהן; 25 January 1918 – 18 May 2006) was an Israeli military and police official and sports shooter.

Kahan was born in South Africa and immigrated to Mandatory Palestine in 1935. He studied at the Technion and joined the Haganah, serving as a senior weapons instructor. In 1940, he enlisted in the British Army and served in the Buffs. He later became a company commander in the Jewish Brigade with the rank of Major and fought in the Italian campaign. He led the assault on Monte Ghebbio during the Spring 1945 offensive in Italy, during which his company ascended the mountain while facing minefields as well as mortar and sniper fire. Kahan called in an artillery barrage and then led an infantry assault which drove the Germans out of their positions. After the German surrender he visited displaced persons camps and participated in Aliyah Bet operations in Belgium and the Netherlands. He also engaged in procurement of munitions for the Haganah.

During the 1948 Arab-Israeli War, Kahan served in the Israel Defense Forces as an officer in the Carmeli Brigade. He was initially a company commander before being given command of the brigade in August 1948. Following his military service he joined the Israel Police and became a senior commander.

Kahan competed in the trap event at the 1964 Summer Olympics. He won a gold medal in the 1969 Maccabiah Games, setting a Maccabiah record for clay pigeon shooting.

Kahan was married to Carmela and they had four children. One of his sons was killed in action during an exchange of fire in the Golan Heights in 1970 while serving in the IDF Combat Engineering Corps. Kahan died in 2006 at the age of 88.
