= Ernest Benjamin =

Canadian-British general

Brigadier Ernest Benjamin CBE
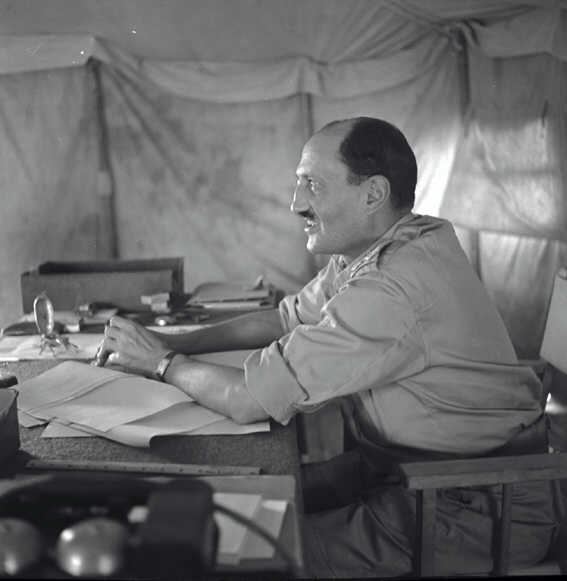
- Benjamin inspects the 2nd Battalion, Jewish Brigade, Palestine, October 1944.
- Born: 5 February 1900; Toronto, Ontario, Canada
- Died: 14 March 1969 (aged 69)
- Military career
- Allegiance: United Kingdom
- Branch: British Army
- Service years: 1919–1950
- Rank: Brigadier
- Service number: 18035
- Unit: Royal Engineers
- Commands: Jewish Brigade
- Conflicts: World War II • Battle of Madagascar • Italian campaign
- Awards: Commander of the Order of the British Empire

Brigadier Ernest Frank Benjamin CBE (Hebrew: לוי בנימין, Levi Binyamin; 5 February 1900 – 14 March 1969) was a Canadian-born British Jewish officer who commanded the British Army's Jewish Brigade during the Second World War.

== Biography ==
Benjamin was born in Toronto, Ontario, Canada, the son of Frank David Benjamin. In 1908 the family moved to England.

Benjamin was a cadet at the Royal Military Academy, Woolwich, and was commissioned as a second lieutenant in the Royal Engineers on 17 July 1919. He was promoted to lieutenant on 17 July 1921, and served as an adjutant from 3 October 1922 until 23 September 1923. On 24 May 1927 he was appointed adjutant to the Divisional Engineers of the 49th (West Riding) Division, Territorial Army, with the temporary rank of captain (with pay and allowances of a lieutenant). He was promoted to captain on 17 July 1930, and left 49th Division on 23 November 1931.

On 10 January 1936 Benjamin was appointed a General staff Officer, 3rd Grade in Malaya serving until 11 January 1939, by which time he has been promoted to major. On 8 July 1943 he received a mention in despatches in recognition of his "gallant and distinguished services" in the Madagascar campaign of 1942.

By then he was serving on the staff at Middle East Command, first as Assistant Quartermaster-General, then as Deputy Director of Military Training. In September 1944 Benjamin was appointed commanding officer of the Jewish Brigade, a 5,000-man volunteer brigade group of Jewish volunteers from Mandatory Palestine, overseeing its training in Egypt, and eventual deployment to the Eighth Army in Italy, seeing action in the Spring 1945 offensive in Italy. Following V-E Day, 8 May 1945, the Jewish Brigade was sent to Tarvisio on the Italian-Austrian-Yugoslav border, where Benjamin was promoted to lieutenant colonel on 1 June 1945, backdated to 13 May. In July 1945 the brigade was sent to the Netherlands, and then to Belgium, as part of VIII Corps. On 13 December 1945 Benjamin was made a Commander of the Order of the British Empire. The Jewish Brigade was eventually disbanded in June 1946.

On 13 May 1948, he completed his tenure as a regimental lieutenant colonel, but remained on full pay as a supernumery officer. He retired from the Army on 4 September 1950, having exceeded the age limit, and was granted the honorary rank of brigadier.
