= Reuven Helman =

Israeli sportsman (1927–2013)

- ראובן הלמן
- Born: 1927; Tel Aviv, Mandatory Palestine
- Died: July 11, 2013 (aged 86); Paris
- Known for: Maccabi Olympian; War Veteran; Weightlifting Champion; Track and Field Champion; Grenade Flinging
- Children: Noava, Aryela and Hedva

Reuven Helman (Hebrew: ראובן הלמן; 1927 – July 11, 2013) was a former Maccabiah Olympian recognized as a weightlifting champion, distinguished athlete in Track and Field, the Decathlon and for his career as an athletic instructor. He competed in shot-put and javelin. Helman came in second in 1957 in the International Maccabiah Games in Tel Aviv, and had also competed in 1953.

== Personal life ==
Helman became an adherent of the Chabad Lubavitch Movement after visiting its spiritual head, Rabbi Menachem M. Schnerson. He attributed his strength to kosher eating, clean living and exercise.

== Military service ==
Helman enlisted in the British Army during World War II and served in the Jewish Brigade. He received a War Medal for his service. He subsequently served in the Israel Defense Forces. Helman fought in the 1948 Arab–Israeli War and was dubbed the “human cannon” for his ability to fling grenades over 75 meters when army supplies were short. He also fought in the Six-Day War and Yom Kippur War.

== See also ==
- List of select Jewish weightlifters
