= Yehuda Arazi =

Israeli paramilitary official (born 1907)

- יהודה ארזי
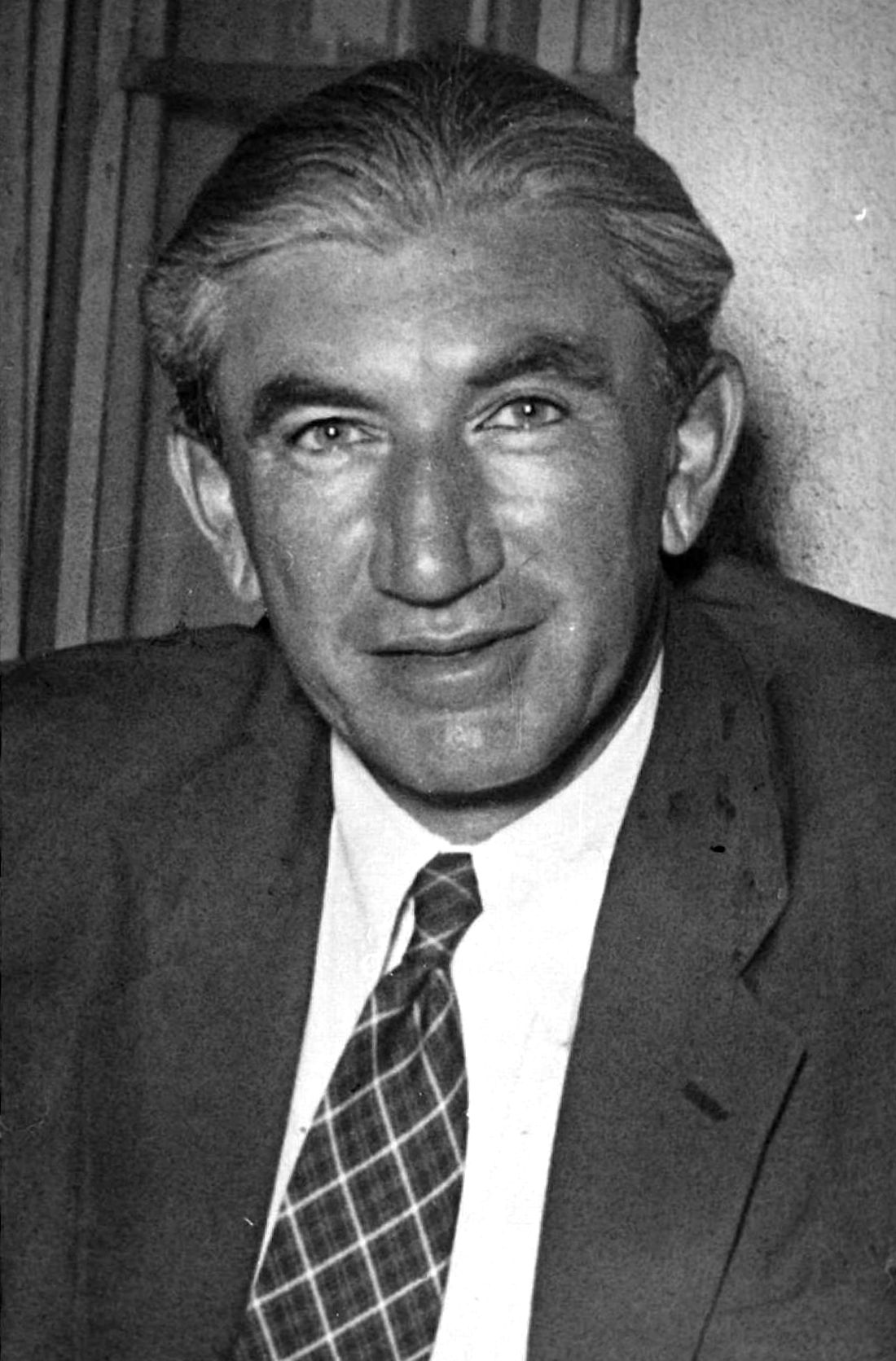
- Born: November 27, 1907; Łódź, Poland
- Died: February 25, 1959 (aged 51); Israel
- Other name: Alon
- Occupations: Military officer, businessman
- Known for: Haganah, Mossad LeAliyah Bet, La Spezia affair
- Spouse: Rivka Albin
- Children: Ruth, Dan

Yehuda Arazi (Hebrew: יהודה ארזי; 27 November 1907 – 25 February 1959), code name Alon, was an Israeli who was active in the Haganah in Palestine during the British Mandate era.

== Biography ==
Arazi was born in Łódź to a Jewish family in 1907. He immigrated with his parents to Tel Aviv in Mandatory Palestine in 1924, studying in the Gymnasia Herzlia. While in Palestine, Arazi joined the Haganah and the Palestine Police Force. As a police officer, he was most notably involved as the investigating officer in the 1933 murder of Chaim Arlosoroff. In 1936, Arazi was sent back to Poland to help smuggle matériel to Palestine.

In 1931 he married Rivka Albin, a year later their daughter Ruth was born. She married in 1955 the Supreme Court judge Gabriel Bach. His son Dan was born in 1941.

In 1943 he stole 5,000 rifles from the British Police for the Haganah, and had to go into hiding. In 1945, after two years of living in hiding as a wanted man in Palestine, Arazi and his partner Yitzhak Levy travelled to Egypt by train dressed as Royal Engineers sergeants. From there, they travelled through North Africa and into Italy, where they joined the Jewish Brigade of the British Army using falsified names. He was head of the Italy branch of the Mossad LeAliyah Bet, the Haganah agency involved in facilitating illegal Jewish immigration to Palestine, and was involved in the "La Spezia" affair.

After the independence of Israel in 1948, Arazi became a private businessman and built the Ramat Aviv Hotel. He died of brain cancer in 1959. Shortly before his death, he befriended the artist Chaim Goldberg, also a Polish Jew, who was commissioned to execute several sculptures and a fully functional water fountain for the front of his hotel. The artist established his studio in a former munitions factory that he received from Arazi, that was located behind the hotel.

Arazi and the La Spezia affair gave the inspiration to Leon Uris for Ari Ben Canaan in Exodus.

Arazi was known as “King of Ruses”, changing disguises and identities according to needs.
