= Gmul =

Short-lived secret unit created in the Jewish Brigade in 1945

Gmul ('Recompense') was a short-lived secret unit created in the Jewish Brigade in 1945 at the end of World War II to identify and kill Germans, particularly SS members, who had taken part in atrocities against Jews. In their three months of operations, they assassinated 100 to 200 Nazi war criminals. Eventually, the British having received complaints about the disappearances, forced an end to the killings.

The Gmul members operated in teams of up to five men typically wearing British Military Police uniform. The teams told targets they were being taken in for interrogation.

A major intelligence breakthrough was achieved by an interrogation of a former Gestapo official in northern Italy: Lists of dozens of senior Nazi names, dates of birth and positions. Gmul tracked each person down, pressured them for more information, and then shot them.

The British stopped Gmul's activity further to hearing complaints from German families about disappearances. The British relocated the British Brigade to Belgium and Netherlands, effectively shutting Gmul down.

== See also ==
- Nakam
- Tilhas Tizig Gesheften
