= Mordechai Surkis =

Israeli politician (1908–1995)

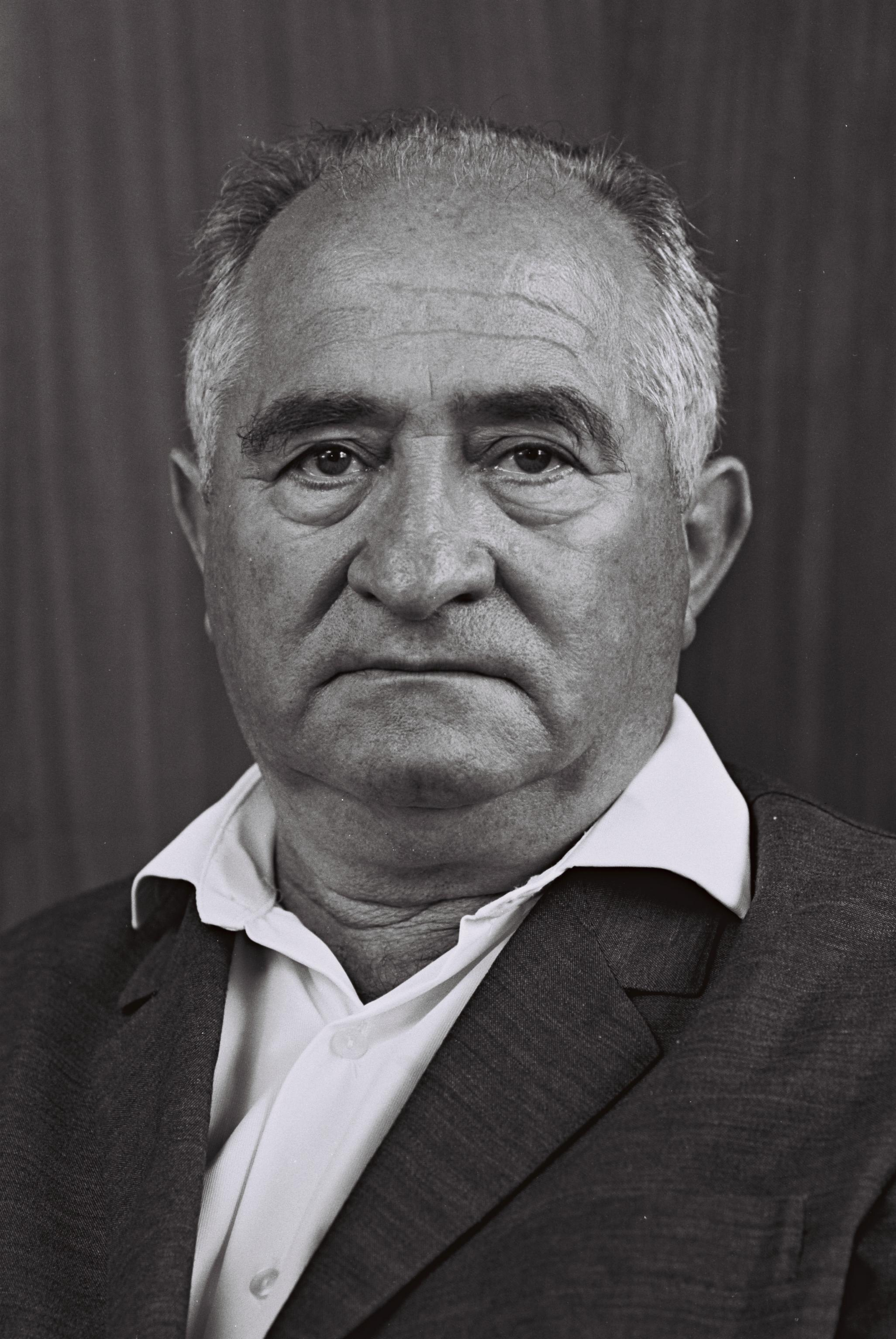
- Surkis in 1965

Faction represented in the Knesset
- 1965–1968: Rafi
- 1968–1969: Labor Party
- 1969–1974: Alignment

Personal details
- Born: 21 January 1908 Stanyslaviv, Austria-Hungary
- Died: 26 May 1995 (aged 87)

Mordechai Surkis (Hebrew: מרדכי סורקיס; 21 January 1908 – 26 May 1995) was an Israeli politician who was the first mayor of Kfar Saba, as well as serving as a member of the Knesset for Rafi and its successors between 1965 and 1974.

== Biography ==
Born in Stanyslaviv in Austria-Hungary (today Ivano-Frankivsk in Ukraine, from 1919 to 1939 in Poland) to Jewish parents, Surkis emigrated to Mandatory Palestine in 1933. He became a member of the Haganah, and during World War II, served in the Jewish Brigade.

In 1951 he became head of Kfar Saba local council. Under his leadership Kfar Saba was declared a city and he became the city's first mayor in 1962, a position he held until 1965. Between 1959 and 1965 he also chaired the Local Government Association. A member of the Mapai central committee, he joined Rafi in 1965 when it was formed by a group of breakaway Mapai members headed by David Ben-Gurion. Later in the year he was elected to the Knesset on the Rafi list. He retained his seat in the 1969 elections, by which time Rafi had merged into the Alignment, but lost his seat in the 1973 elections.

He died in 1995 at the age of 87.
