= Gabriel Bach =

Israeli judge (1927–2022)

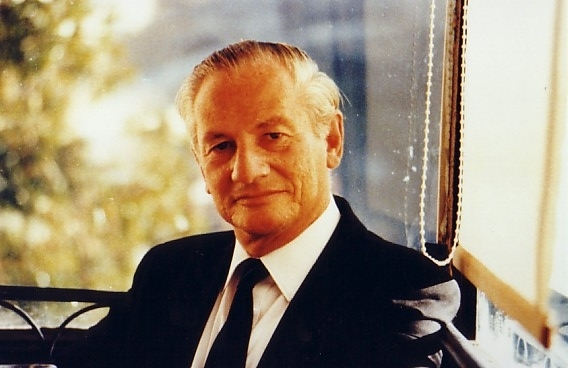
Bach in 2012

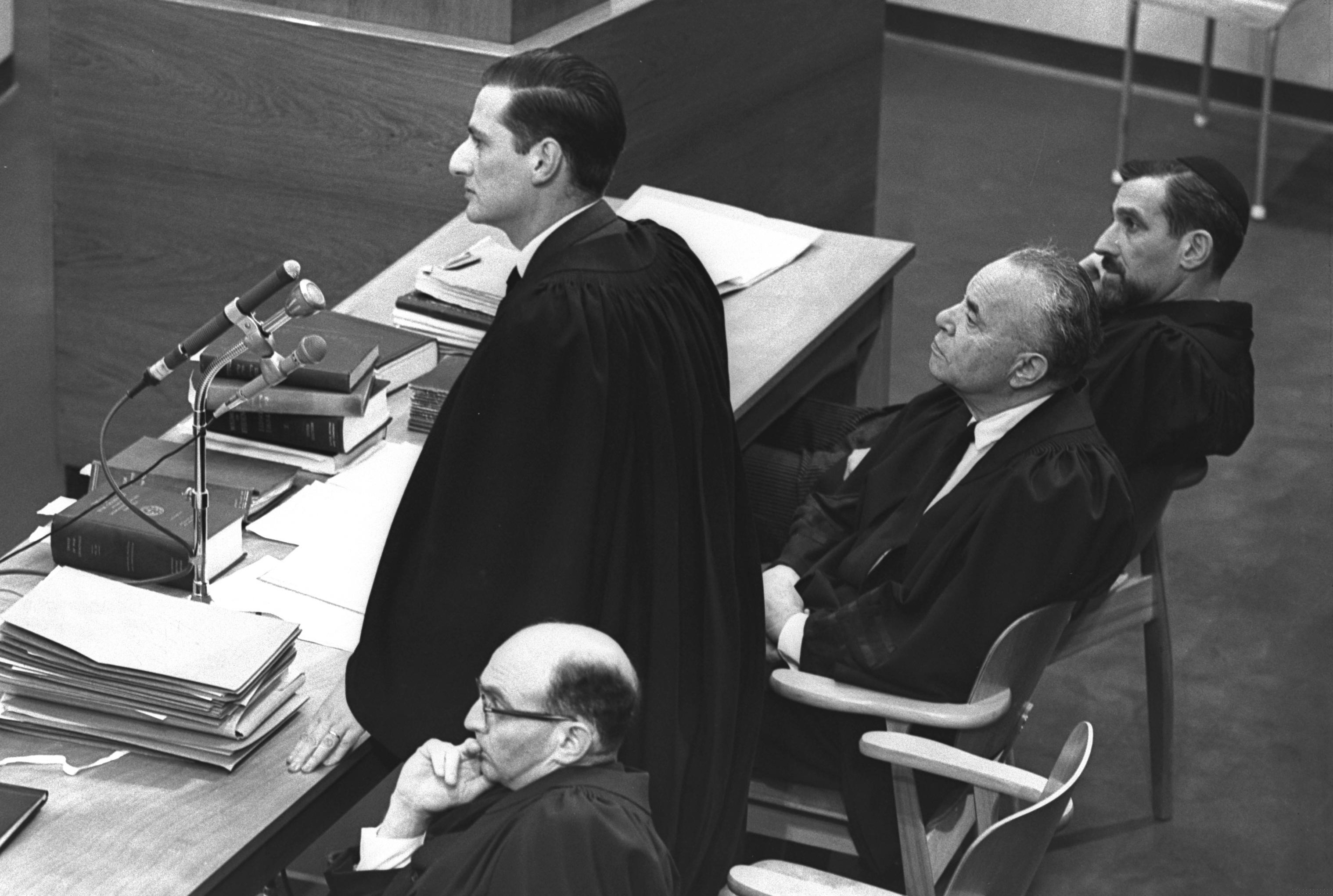
Bach in 1961

Gabriel Bach (Hebrew: גבריאל בך; 13 March 1927 – 18 February 2022) was a German-born Israeli jurist, who was a judge of the Supreme Court of Israel and was the deputy prosecutor in the prosecution of Adolf Eichmann.

== Biography ==
Bach was born in Halberstadt, Province of Saxony, Prussia, Germany, on 13 March 1927. He was the son of Victor Bach, who was the general manager of the Hirsch copper and brass factory, and his wife Erna (née Benscher) Bach. He grew up in Berlin-Charlottenburg, Berlin, and attended Theodor Herzl School in what became the Adolf-Hitler-Platz.

In October 1938 the Bach family emigrated from Nazi Germany to Amsterdam, where he continued to attend school. He was the only survivor of his Jewish classmates from this school. In 1940, a month before the invasion of the Netherlands by the German army, the family booked a passage to Mandatory Palestine and settled in Jerusalem. He joined the Haganah in 1943 and attended high school at the Hebrew University Secondary School, graduating in 1945.

After a year of studies at the Hebrew University of Jerusalem, he received a scholarship to study law at University College London. After graduating with honors in 1949, he interned in a law office before returning to Israel, where he did military service in the Israel Defense Forces in the Military Advocate General's Corps from 1951 to 1953, and was discharged from active service with the rank of captain. In his military reserve duty he served as a judge on the Military Court of Appeals, reaching the rank of colonel.

In 1953 Bach began working in the State Attorney's Office. In 1961 he was appointed Deputy Attorney General and as the second of the three prosecutors in the Eichmann trial.

In 1969, he was appointed State Attorney. In 1982 he was appointed a judge of the Supreme Court of Israel and retired in 1997. In 1984 he served as the precedent-breaking Chairman of the Central Elections Committee. He was subsequently appointed the chairman of several senior government committees and fact finding commissions.

He subsequently represented Israel at international conferences. Bach was a long-term board member of the Israel Council on Foreign Relations.

Bach married Ruth Arazi, the daughter of Yehuda Arazi, in 1955. The couple lived in Jerusalem. He died on 18 February 2022, at the age of 94. Eulogizing Bach, Professor Dina Porat wrote:

Gaby was known for his liberal views and for his spirited defense of the rights of the accused. He was a tireless advocate of freedom of expression and women's rights. His rulings generally reflected those values, as did his work in a large number of investigative committees. Moreover, Gaby stressed the importance of treating everyone with respect and fairness, and was always true to his word... Gaby was involved in many trials, and his conduct and fair rulings garnered him much favor in the eyes of the public. Examples of this include the mitigation of the sentence of Carmela Bohbut, who killed her abusive husband; the defense of Mordechai Rahamim, an El Al security guard who shot and killed terrorists in Zurich; the arrest of Rabbi Meir Kahane and the restrictions imposed upon him; and the trial of Michael Rohan, who attempted to set the al-Aqsa Mosque ablaze.

== Awards ==
- 1949: Buchman Prize
- Commander's Cross of the Order of Merit of the Federal Republic of Germany (10 October 1997)
- Friend of Jerusalem
- Honorary Member of the University of London
- Lemkin Award, Los Angeles (2011)
- Jülich Society Prize for Tolerance (2014)
- Mensch International Foundation awarded to him as "Mensch" (2014)

== Headings ==
- Genocide trials in Israel, in: Herbert Reginbogin and Christoph Safferling (eds.): The Nuremberg Trials. International criminal law since 1945. International Conference on the 60th Anniversary - The Nuremberg Trials : International Criminal Law Since 1945. 60th Anniversary International Conference. KG Saur, Munich 2005 ISBN 3-598-11756-6 Bilingual. Post: pp. 216–223, in English, German summary

== Movie ==
- Gabriel Bach, The Prosecutor and the Eichmann trial by Wolfgang Schoen and Frank Gutermuth, TV Schoen film D 2010 TV Schoen Movie

== Literature ==
- Peter Kasza : Purified he gave himself only from the gallows Süddeutsche Zeitung of 27 January 2007
