= Morris Beckman (writer) =

British writer

- Born: 21 February 1921; Hackney, London, England
- Died: 24 May 2015 (aged 94); Childs Hill, London, England
- Occupation: Writer
- Writing career
- Period: 1944–2015

Morris Beckman (21 February 1921 – 24 May 2015) was an English writer and anti-fascist activist.

== Biography ==
=== Early life ===
Morris Beckman was born in the north-eastern London Borough of Hackney. He attended Hackney Downs School. In 1939, when World War II started, he tried to enlist in the Royal Air Force to become a pilot, but was turned down and signed up for the Merchant Navy as a radio officer.

=== Merchant Navy ===
After three months training to become a radio officer, studying Morse code, Beckman was assigned to merchant vessels participating in the Battle of the Atlantic until 1942 and was torpedoed twice. He was posted to Bombay in 1942 and spent two years with the Mogul Line, crewing auxiliary vessels for the Royal Indian Navy across the Bay of Bengal, the Red Sea and the Persian Gulf. Beckman's vessels landed troops at Port Augusta during the Allied invasion of Sicily in 1943 and, three months later, at Taranto during the Allied invasion of Italy. In 1944 his ship was attacked by the Luftwaffe en route to Alexandria, lost a propeller and was towed to Port Sudan. He caught paratyphoid, convalesced in Karachi, then worked his passage back home via Durban and New York.

By 1946 he was permanently onshore back in London and helped to found the 43 Group. He made his home at Amhurst Road in Hackney.

=== Career ===
Beckman tried his hand at several businesses and eventually went into partnership with John David Gold to start a men's clothes manufacturer, opening their first factory in Crawley in 1952. The firm steadily expanded, at one time having several factories in the UK and one in Malta. In 1975, faced with increasingly cheap imports from Hong Kong, Taiwan and Singapore, the company went into liquidation. Beckman started further small-scale businesses in the same industry, eventually giving up work for writing in the 1980s.

=== Writing ===
While working for the Mogul Line, Beckman wrote many articles and short stories which were published in the Sind Gazette and Egyptian Mail amongst other newspapers. His first and only novel, Open Skies and Lost Cargoes, was published by Thacker & Co in Bombay in 1944. Beckman wrote little after leaving the Merchant Navy until the 1980s when he began to document his experiences growing up in Hackney, serving in the Merchant Navy and fighting British fascist groups with the 43 Group. Since The 43 Group was published, Beckman lectured in Britain, Germany, Holland and Ireland to groups interested in the fight against fascism. Subsequent autobiographical works are The Hackney Crucible about growing up in Hackney before World War II, and Atlantic Roulette about the Battle of the Atlantic. Beckman also wrote The Jewish Brigade: An Army With Two Masters about the Jewish Brigade.

== Publications ==
- Ocean Skies and Lost Cargoes (1944)
- The 43 Group, Centerprise (1993)
- The Hackney Crucible (1996)
- Atlantic Roulette (1996)
- The Jewish Brigade (1999)
- Flying the Red Duster, Spellmount (2011)

== Death ==
He died in 2015, aged 94.
