= Orli Markman =

Israeli military official (born 1969)

Orly Markman
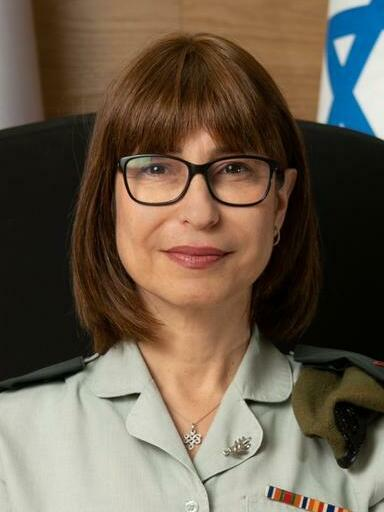
- Orly Markman
- Native name: אורלי מרקמן
- Born: 1969 (age 55–56) Be'er Sheva, Israel
- Rank: Aluf
- Conflicts: Second Intifada; Operation Summer Rains; Second Lebanon War; Operation Cast Lead; Operation Pillar of Defense; Operation Protective Edge; Gaza war
- Alma mater: Hebrew University of Jerusalem; Tel Aviv University

Orly Markman (Hebrew: אורלי מרקמן; born 1969) is an IDF officer with the rank of Aluf (Major General), currently serving as the President of the Military Court of Appeals. In February 2022, she was promoted to the rank of Aluf, becoming the third woman in IDF history to receive this rank, following Orna Barbivai and Yifat Tomer-Yerushalmi, and the first to serve as the President of the Military Court of Appeals.

== Biography ==
Markman was born in Israel. She grew up in Neighborhood B in Be'er Sheva, attended the "Yaelim" and "Netivot Yoram" schools, and graduated from Comprehensive High School D in the city.

She enlisted in the IDF as part of the Atuda, in 1991, completed a bachelor's degree in law from the Hebrew University of Jerusalem. In 1993, she was certified as a lawyer after completing an internship in the military prosecution. In 1999, she graduated with distinction with a master's degree in law from Tel Aviv University.

=== Professional career ===
Markman served as a military prosecutor in the Gaza Strip area, as an assistant to the Chief Military Advocate, as the advocate for the Air Force and Navy, and as a senior assistant to the Chief Military Prosecutor.

In 2000, she was appointed as a judge in the Southern Command and Ground Forces District Military Court. In 2009, she was promoted to the rank of Lieutenant Colonel and appointed as the president of the court. In 2010, she was appointed as the president of the IDF and Home Front District Military Court. In 2013, she additionally became the president of the Special Military Court that deals with senior officers and indictments carrying a death sentence. In November 2016, she was promoted to the rank of Brigadier General and in January 2017, after serving in an acting capacity for several months, she was appointed as a judge and deputy president of the Military Court of Appeals.

In February 2022, she was promoted to the rank of Aluf (Major General) and appointed as the President of the Military Court of Appeals.

=== Notable Cases Judged ===
- She judged the case of a soldier who raped a female soldier in Camp 80, sentencing him to four years in prison and ordering him to pay 20,000 NIS in compensation to the victim.
- As the president of the Southern Command Military Court in Qastina:
  - She judged the case of two Givati Brigade soldiers who used a Palestinian child in a "neighbor procedure" during Operation Cast Lead. They were convicted of exceeding authority to the point of endangering life and unbecoming behavior of a soldier, sentenced to three months' conditional imprisonment, and demoted from Staff Sergeant to Sergeant.
- As the president of the Special Military Court in Kirya:
  - She judged the case of the commander of the Tzabar Battalion of the Givati Brigade, Lt. Col. Liran Hajbi, who was convicted of unbecoming behavior towards two female soldiers under his command, and was demoted to the rank of Major and ordered to pay 5,000 NIS in compensation to the complainant against him.
  - She judged the case of Brigadier General Ofek Buchris.

== Personal life ==
Markman is married to attorney Gilad Markman, and they have four children. She resides in Rehovot.
