= Yifat Tomer-Yerushalmi =

Major general of the Israel Defense Forces (born 1974)

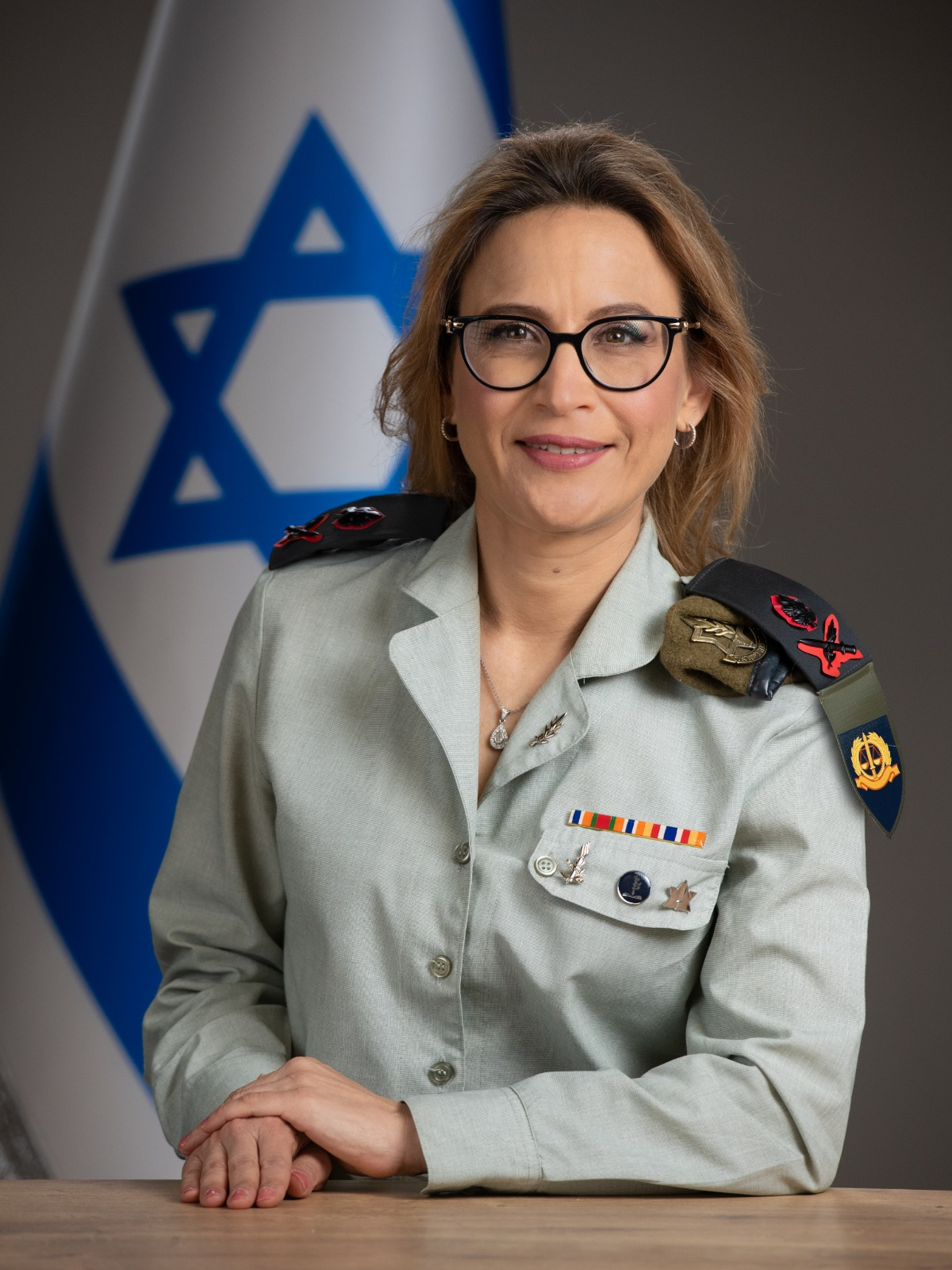
- Tomer-Yerushalmi in 2022
- Native name: יפעת תומר-ירושלמי
- Born: 1974 (age 51–52); Netanya, Israel
- Allegiance: Israel
- Branch: Israeli Ground Forces
- Service years: 1992–present
- Rank: Aluf
- Conflicts: Second Intifada; Operation Summer Rains; Second Lebanon War; Operation Cast Lead; Operation Pillar of Defense; Operation Protective Edge; Gaza war
- Education: Tel Aviv University, Hebrew University of Jerusalem

Yifat Tomer-Yerushalmi (Hebrew: יפעת תומר-ירושלמי; born 1974) is an Israeli major general who served as the Israel Defense Forces' chief military advocate from 1 September 2021 to 31 October 2025. She was the second woman in the history of the IDF to hold this rank. Previously, she served as the gender affairs advisor to the chief of staff of the IDF.

She resigned and was subsequently arrested on 2 November 2025 after admitting to authorizing the release of classified surveillance of alleged Israeli abuse of Palestinian prisoners at Sde Teiman detention camp during the Gaza war.

== Early life and education ==
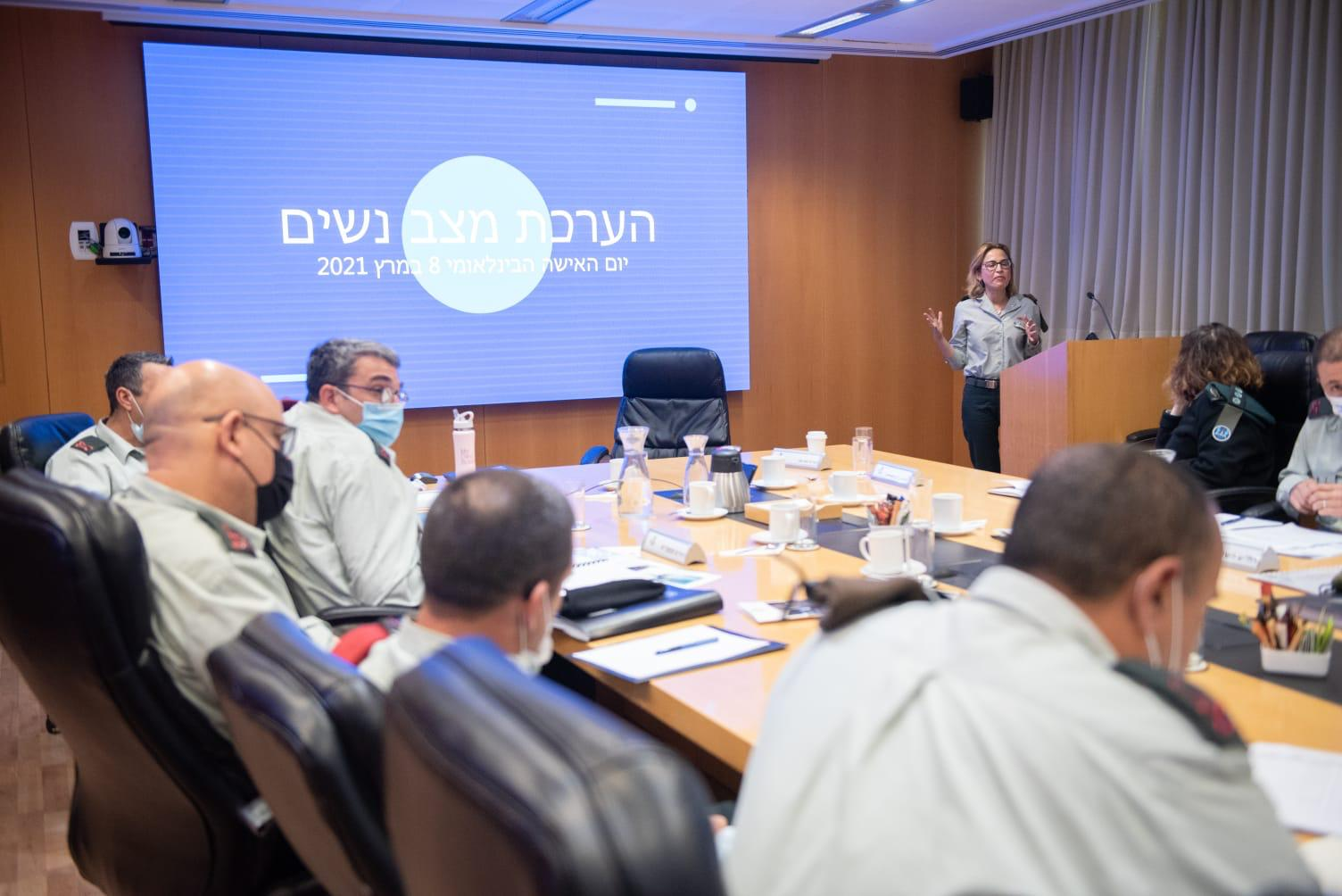
The advisor for gender affairs Yifat Tomer Yerushalmi at the IDF General Staff Forum on International Women's Day, 8 March 2021.

Tomer-Yerushalmi grew up in Netanya. She studied law at the Hebrew University of Jerusalem, as part of the Military Academic Reserve, and graduated with honors. In 1996, after completing her studies, she enlisted in the Israel Defense Forces and joined the Military Advocate General. In 1997, she was certified as a lawyer after interning at the Chief Military Prosecutor's office. In 1999, she graduated with a master's degree in law with honors from Tel Aviv University. Simultaneously, she served as a teaching assistant in a criminal law course. In 2003, she was sent by the IDF to pursue a master's degree at The Judge Advocate General's Legal Center and School in Charlottesville, Virginia, United States, which she completed with distinction.

Tomer-Yerushalmi is a graduate of the IDF Command and Staff College "Afak".

== Military career ==
During her military service, she held various positions in the Military Advocate General's Corps, including: senior assistant to the chief military prosecutor, legal assistant to the chief military prosecutor, Menachem Finkelstein, deputy prosecutor of the Central Command, head of Legal Supervision Branch, and head of Legislation and Communication Branch.

As assistant to the chief military prosecutor, she was involved in formulating legal opinions regarding the 1997 Israeli helicopter disaster and the Ansariya ambush.

In this role she handled major legal issues, including: the legal implications of the Second Intifada, handling conscientious objectors and more.

As head of legal supervision in the Military Advocate General's Corps, she sought the demotion of Colonel Elhanan Tannenbaum due to his involvement in serious crimes of drug trafficking and forgery, during which time he was kidnapped by Hezbollah. Tomer-Yerushalmi represented the army's position before a special committee, headed by Brigadier General (res.) Amnon Strashnov, which ordered his demotion to the rank of private.

In 2007 she was appointed as a judge of the military court in the jurisdictions of the General Staff, Central, Home front, and Air Force.

In 2010 she was promoted to deputy president of the military court for the General Staff and Home Front. During her tenure as a judge, she handled complex and sensitive cases in various fields, including severe sex offenses; drug trafficking and use; unauthorized military weapon possession; negligent manslaughter, and more.

In 2015 she returned to the Military Advocate General's Corps, appointed as head of the Advisory and Legislation Department and promoted to the rank of brigadier general. In this role, she headed a department providing legal counsel to all IDF branches in constitutional, administrative, and civil law. She also coordinated legislative processes related to the IDF and represented the military's positions in various issues in government offices and Knesset committees.

In July 2019 the chief of general staff, Lt. Gen. Aviv Kohavi, decided to appoint her as the advisor to the chief of general staff for gender affairs, and she began her role in September 2019. As the Advisor for Gender Affairs, Tomer-Yerushalmi focuses on promoting gender equality, ensuring a safe and respectful service environment, and preventing sexual harassment in the IDF. During her tenure, she initiated the establishment of the "Metsapim" center, which opened in October 2020, dealing with the integration of parenthood and service, providing support and guidance for regular service members during pregnancy and early parenthood stages, as well as during fertility treatments.

On 1 September 2021 she entered the role of chief military advocate, was promoted to the rank of major general, becoming the second female major general in the history of the IDF, after Orna Barbivai, and the first woman to head the Military Advocate General's Corps.

=== Resignation ===
On 31 October 2025, Tomer-Yerushalmi resigned from her post after admitting she was responsible for leaking a classified surveillance video to the media. The video, which was broadcast by Israel's Channel 12 in August 2024, allegedly showed the sexual assault of a Palestinian detainee by Israeli soldiers at the Sde Teiman detention camp. The leak and the video generated significant political backlash.

The leaked footage showed soldiers at the Sde Teiman facility taking a detainee aside and surrounding him with riot shields to block visibility. Reports indicated that the detainee was subsequently stabbed in the rectum with a sharp object, an act characterized by some sources as sexual assault or sodomy; the alleged stabbing was not shown in the film. The detainee reportedly suffered serious injuries and required hospitalization because of the alleged abuse. Following an investigation into the incident, five Israeli reserve soldiers were charged with aggravated abuse and causing serious bodily harm; they denied the charges.

In her resignation letter, Tomer-Yerushalmi stated that she had approved the release of the material "in an attempt to counter false propaganda against the army's law enforcement authorities", referring to claims by right-wing political figures that reports of detainee abuse were fabricated. She emphasized the military's legal and ethical duty to investigate unlawful acts, even in war, and expressed regret that the principle that "there are actions which must never be taken even against the vilest of detainees" was no longer universally accepted. Her resignation came after a criminal probe was launched into the leak, and she was placed on leave.

Defense Minister Israel Katz welcomed Tomer-Yerushalmi's resignation, stating that anyone who spreads "blood libels against IDF troops is unfit to wear the army's uniform". Prime Minister Benjamin Netanyahu was quoted saying, that the publication of the video was "perhaps the most severe public relations attack that the state of Israel has experienced since its establishment".

On 2 November, the IDF stated that Tomer-Yerushalmi had gone missing. Search efforts focused on Hatzuk Beach in Tel Aviv. At the time, she was scheduled to be questioned as part of the criminal investigation into the leak. She was found alive at a beach in Herzliya after several hours, with police, military, and rescue forces participating in her search. She was arrested by police later that night, along with former IDF prosecutor Matan Solomesh. On 7 November, she was released to ten days of house arrest. Her missing phone was recovered by civilians on Hatzuk Beach and turned in to the police that same day. On 9 November, she was admitted to the Tel Aviv Sourasky Medical Center after reportedly overdosing on pills, although her condition was thought to be stable. Police Commissioner Daniel Levi confirmed that she had attempted suicide.

She was discharged from the hospital in early December; her house arrest ended while she was hospitalized.

In May 2026, IDF Chief of Staff decided to formally dismiss Tomer-Yerushalmi from military service, which would strip her of eligibility for financial benefits normally granted to discharged senior officers.

== Personal life ==
Tomer-Yerushalmi is married and a mother of three children. She resides in Ramat HaSharon.

== Articles written ==
- Y. Tomer-Yerushalmi, R. Polyak, Military Investigation Immunity, in Menachem Finkelstein's Book – Law, Security and Book, p. 169 (Nevo Publishing), 2020
- Yifat Tomer-Yerushalmi, Vision for Equality in the IDF, Israel Hayom, 8 March 2020
