= Alex Stein (judge) =

Israeli jurist (born 1957)

- אָלֵכְּס שְׁטַיין
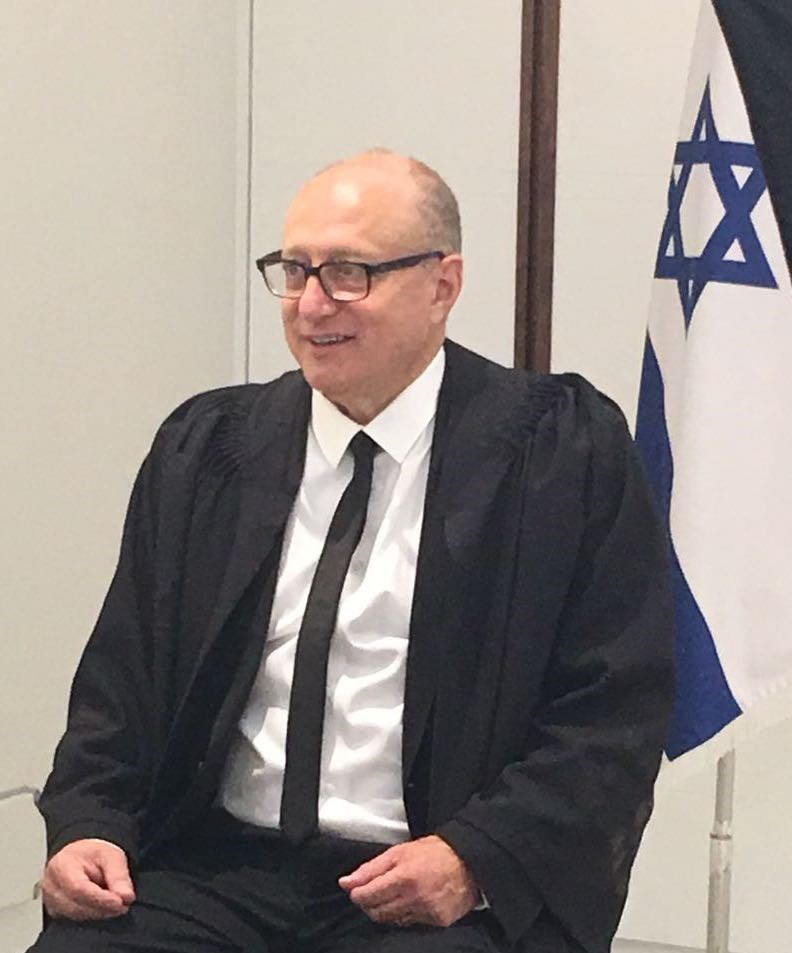
- Alex Stein

Justice of the Supreme Court of Israel
- Incumbent
- Assumed office 9 August 2018

Personal details
- Born: October 27, 1957 (age 69) Chișinău, Soviet Union, (Moldova)
- Education: Hebrew University of Jerusalem (LL.B.), (MA); University of London (LL.D.)

Alex Stein (Hebrew: אָלֵכְּס שְׁטַיין; born 27 October 1957) is an Israeli jurist who has served as a justice of the Supreme Court of Israel since 2018. He is considered to be a conservative justice and one of the most prominent legal scholars in Israel.

== Early life and education ==
Alex Stein was born to a Jewish family in Chișinău, Soviet Union in 1957. He immigrated to Israel with his family in 1973. He completed his high school studies at the Leo Baeck School in Haifa, and was drafted into the Israel Defense Forces in 1976, serving in the C4I Corps. He participated in Operation Litani and the 1982 Lebanon War.

After being discharged, he studied law at the Hebrew University of Jerusalem, earning a Bachelor of Laws in 1983 and a Master of Laws in 1987. He later studied at University College London and earned a Doctor of Philosophy in law from the University of London in 1990. He clerked for Rachel Sukar, head of the Criminal Litigation Department in the Attorney General's Office, from 1982 to 1983, then for Supreme Court Justice Menachem Elon from 1983 to 1984.

== Academic and legal career ==
Stein was admitted to the Israel Bar Association in 1984, and worked as an attorney with two law firms in Jerusalem from 1984 to 1987, specializing in commercial litigation. In his reserve military service, he served in the Military Advocate General's Office as a legal officer in the military government of the Gaza Strip.

After earning his doctorate in law in 1990, Stein joined the Faculty of Law of the Hebrew University of Jerusalem in 1991. During his tenure there, he was appointed a full Professor and served as Deputy Dean of the Faculty of Law. In 2004, he moved to New York City and joined the Faculty of the Cardozo School of Law at Yeshiva University, where he taught from 2004 to 2016. He taught at Brooklyn Law School from 2016 to 2018. He was also a visiting professor at Harvard University, Yale University, Columbia University, the University of Toronto, and the University of Oxford.

In his academic career, Stein authored five books and over eighty articles, sat on the editorial boards of two law reviews, and founded an online legal journal dedicated to medical malpractice. In 2014, Stein was one of the most cited scholars in the field of evidence law in the United States. He has authored four books, two of which are widely recognized as pioneering contributions to the fields of tort law and evidence. With over eighty published articles—many featured in the world’s foremost academic journals—his scholarship spans torts, evidence, medical malpractice, and the economic analysis of law. His expertise has earned him invitations to speak at academic conferences across the globe, and his insights have been cited by prominent international media outlets, including The New York Times, Frankfurter Allgemeine Zeitung, and Nature.

In February 2018, Stein was selected to serve as a Justice on the Israeli Supreme Court by the Judicial Selection Committee. After returning to live in Israel, he was sworn in on 9 August 2018 upon the retirement of Justice Uri Shoham. A petition against his candidacy for the Supreme Court on grounds of his long-term residency in the United States was thrown out. The Judicial Selection Committee had questioned him about his son who was living in the United States and had not served in the Israel Defense Forces, while he assured them that his son would do military service. His appointment received praise by Nick Allard, President and Dean of Brooklyn Law School who said “Stein is one of the world’s brilliant legal minds." He has since continued holding seminars to law schools, visiting Notre Dame Law School in 2024 with US Supreme Court Justice Amy Coney Barrett.

== Personal life ==
Stein is married to Shirley Blaier-Stein, an author, an attorney and autism rights activist and is a father of five. One of his children has special needs. He is a chess enthusiast, having been a teenage chess champion in the Soviet Union and an arbitrator in the Israeli Chess Federation.

Stein had a Facebook account where he had criticized the Israeli Supreme Court over judicial activism, which he deleted when he became a Justice of the Israeli Supreme Court.
