= Killing of Abdel Fattah al-Sharif =

2016 shooting by an Israeli soldier

Coordinates: 31.5236°N 35.1037°E

- Part of the Israeli–Palestinian conflict (2015–2016)
- Date: 24 March 2016
- Deaths: 2 (1 attacker shot before the incident)
- Injuries: 1 (Israeli soldier wounded before the incident)
- Victim: Abdel Fattah al-Sharif
- Perpetrator: Elor Azaria
- Charges: Manslaughter
- Verdict: Found guilty
- Convictions: 18 months' imprisonment, 12 months' probation, rank demotion

On March 24, 2016, Elor Azaria, an Israel Defense Forces (IDF) soldier, fatally shot Abdel Fattah al-Sharif, a Palestinian, in the head as the latter lay wounded on the ground in the Tel Rumeida neighborhood of Hebron. Al-Sharif had stabbed an Israeli soldier. Azaria was arrested and the Israeli Military Police opened an investigation against him for the charge of murder, but later reduced the charge to manslaughter.

The soldier's act sparked widespread public debate in Israel, that became a continuation of an already widespread debate over how one should implement the rules of engagement orders in the wake of the wave of Palestinian political violence.

Azaria was convicted of manslaughter and sentenced to 18 months' imprisonment, twelve months' probation, plus a demotion in rank. He was released from prison after serving nine months. The Palestinian Authority said the trial of Azaria was a farce. The family of al-Sharif, which had demanded Azaria receive a life-sentence, said that the Israeli military gives harsher sentences to Palestinian children convicted of throwing stones. In 2026, Azaria was pardoned by the president of Israel.

== Incident ==
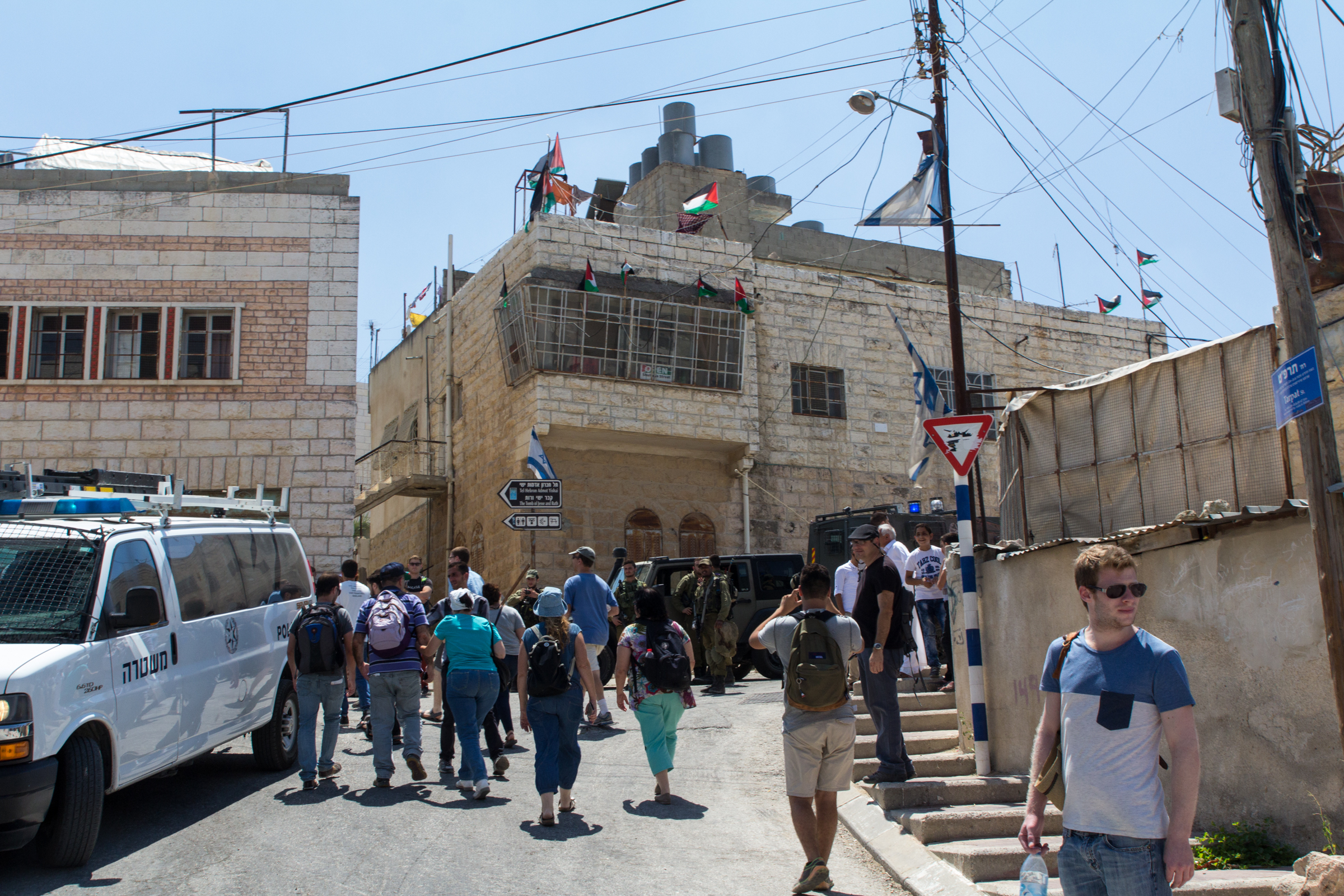
Site of the shooting, several months before the incident

On 24 March 2016, two Palestinians armed with knives, Ramzi Aziz al-Tamimi al-Qasrawi and Abdel Fattah al-Sharif, approached an Israeli military post guarded by soldiers of the Shimshon Battalion of the IDF's Kfir Brigade in the Tel Rumeida neighborhood of Hebron and stabbed an Israeli soldier in the hand and shoulder, moderately injuring him. The soldiers opened fire, killing al-Qasrawi and seriously injuring al-Sharif.

A few minutes later, reinforcements arrived, including Elor Azaria, a medic from the battalion. Azaria approached the wounded al-Sharif and fatally shot him in the head while standing less than two meters away. A video of Azaria killing al-Sharif was published by B'Tselem, and went viral on Israeli social media, sparking controversy.

== Investigation and trial ==
Following the shooting, Azaria's company commander, Major Tom Na'aman, reported it to the battalion commander, Lieutenant Colonel David Shapira, who in turn reported it to the commander of the Kfir Brigade, Colonel Guy Hazut. Four hours after the incident, an initial investigation was opened and Azaria was suspended from duty. After the video was posted to social media, and after a report by Colonel Hazut was submitted to Chief Military Advocate General Sharon Afek, a military police investigation was opened and Azaria was detained. Azaria was initially treated as a murder suspect, but on 31 March, prosecutors told a court they were looking into manslaughter charges. The initial investigation found that the shooting occurred three minutes after IDF soldiers shot and neutralized the knife-wielding assailants and pathologists ruled that Azaria's shot was responsible for the assailant's death and not his previous wounds. An IDF investigation whose details were revealed on March 27 found that Azaria had said the assailant "needs to die" before killing him. At trial, a fellow unit member testified that this was said after the shooting. In his testimony, Azaria denied he said that, and suggested other things he said may have been misinterpreted. The investigation also found that fellow soldiers had tried to calm him.

During a court hearing on 24 March, Azaria's attorney said the soldier feared the assailant had an explosive vest hidden under his shirt. IDF officials rejected this, saying the assailants had already been checked for explosives and that Azaria did not follow the procedures for such concerns before opening fire. During the investigation, Azaria also stated that the assailant tried to reach for a knife that was "within reach" of him, while video footage showed the knife was a significant distance away from the assailant, who was critically injured.

On 31 March, military judge Lieutenant Colonel Ronen Shor ordered the shooter released from jail to open arrest at his base, the headquarters of the Kfir Brigade. The judge, however, stayed this decision until the next day while the prosecution, which wanted his detention extended for a week, appealed against the decision. He was also barred from making any contact with the witness or carrying a gun. The prosecution's appeal was rejected on 1 April, with the shooter being transferred to open arrest on his base. A further appeal hearing by a military appeals court was set on 5 April. The military appeals court upheld the decision of the lower court on 5 April.

On 3 April, it was reported that both the Israeli and Palestinian pathologists had determined that it was Azaria's bullet which killed al-Sharif. It was also noted by the prosecution that the temperature during the incident was cold, so al-Sharif wearing a coat at the time wouldn't have been suspicious. The military prosecution announced on 14 April that the soldier will be charged with manslaughter. Azaria's identity had been kept under gag order, which was lifted on 18 April following his indictment. Vice News obtained a classified IDF document concerning the killing. The document described internal investigations concluding that Azaria had actually killed al-Sharif because he felt that "he needs to die" since he was a terrorist. The report stated that both Palestinian assailants had already been checked by another soldier before Azaria's arrival at the scene. It also stated that Azaria had changed his version of events during his questioning, stating that he shot the assailant because he felt that there was a threat to his life.

The trial opened on 9 May in a Jaffa court and Azaria was charged with manslaughter and conduct unbecoming of a noncommissioned officer. He denied the charge of manslaughter during his arraignment on May 23, pleading not guilty. The body of al-Sharif was returned to his family for his funeral, which was held on 28 May. On 29 May, Azaria's defence team demanded the body be returned, arguing its absence hampered legal proceedings.

IDF's lead investigator testified in court on 1 June that an ambulance driver, Ofer Ohana, who took many videos of the incident, had moved a knife thought to have been used in the earlier stabbing closer to al-Sharif and tampered with evidence to make it look like Azaria had killed him in self-defence. The prosecution's video footage revealed that the knife was lying three to four metres away from the injured al-Sharif and was thus out of his reach both before and after the shooting. Ohana, who was filming the incident, stopped his video after the shooting, moved the knife and then started the video again. The prosecution also showed additional footage which showed Azaria shaking hands with far-right activist Baruch Marzel. The lead investigator also stated that Azaria had sent a text message to his father, telling him that he made sure that the injured al-Sharif was killed. The prosecution showed footage which appeared to show Ohana kicking the knife towards al-Sharif after the shooting. Military prosecutors took a statement from Ohana and confiscated his phone after filing a warrant request in court. According to testimonies by eyewitnesses, the second attacker was also executed with a shot to head while lying on the ground after being incapacitated. A forensics expert testifying before the court on 8 June said that the video of the incident showing Azaria shooting al-Sharif had not been tampered with. Azaria's lawyer alleged that Imad Abu Shamsyieh, who documented the killing, wasn't there by happenstance. He also said that his son had been arrested a month and a half ago. Shamsyieh responded that his son had indeed been arrested but he had been released by the police later and hadn't done anything wrong. Azaria's commander, Major Tom Naaman, testified before the court on 16 June that the victim posed no danger and Azaria had said that the victim needed to die.

On 16 June, Dr. Hadas Gips, a pathologist from the Abu Kabir Forensic Institute, testified before the court. She stated that bleeding in al-Sharif's brain suggested that his heart was still beating when the bullet fired by Azaria hit his head. She also said that the rest of his wounds were not immediately fatal and that he could have been saved had he been given medical treatment. When questioned by the defence team about the potential consequences of the shootings which preceded the one by Azaria, Gips stated that even after a shooting to the head which paralyzes the brain centers, the heart continues to beat sporadically. So if al-Sharif was shot in the head beforehand, there wouldn't be bleeding in other parts of the body that are not in the brain. She stated that the shot to the head was the last shot. In response to the question of whether there could be movement in the limbs after the brain fails to function, she replied that there could be small muscle cramps but that she had have reservations about this and that it was outside her area of expertise.

On 5 July, Ohana was questioned by prosecutors. When questioned about the conversation he had with Azaria's father, he refused to divulge any details. When asked about the knife used by al-Sharif being moved, he answered that he had moved the knife closer after it had been moved further away from its original location by an ambulance driving away so that al-Sharif wouldn't be claimed to be another innocent person shot by Israelis. The prosecution, however, showed a video in which the knife was still far from al-Sharif's body even after the ambulance arrived. It also alleged that both Ohana and Azaria had attempted to cover up the fact that the shooting was in revenge and that he had told Azaria to lie to the police. Ohana denied this, saying that he only told Azaria he would help him get a lawyer. The prosecution further stated that Ohana lied when he said he thought that al-Sharif had a bomb, because he would not have moved so close to his body if that was the case.

Colonel Yariv Ben-Ezra, the commander of Hebron Brigades at the time of shooting, testified on 6 July that the shooting was unwarranted and that there were no explosives.

On 11 July, a soldier present at the scene testified that he saw Azaria cock his gun and heard him say that al-Sharif deserved to die.

David Shapira, another superior of Azaria who was present at the scene, testified on 12 July that Azaria never mentioned a bomb threat and only stated his fear of the knife next to the stabber. Shapira further stated that when he asked Azaria after the shooting about why he didn't kick away the knife, he responded that he felt threatened. Shapira stated that he then told Azaria that he didn't believe him and Azaria fell silent.

On 24 July, Azaria was cross-examined for the first time by the prosecution. Azaria stated that he shot al-Sharif when he started moving as he feared he might detonate an explosive device or would try to reach the knife near him. On 25 July, Azaria stated that the knife was not near al-Sharif, contradicting his earlier statement that it was. He also said that Tom Naaman had lied, stating Shapira was only involved second-hand.

On 26 July, the final day of the cross-examination, Azaria denied that his motive for shooting al-Sharif was revenge and that Shapira was lying. He said that the reason he shot al-Sharif was that people were shouting that al-Sharif had a bomb on him and that al-Sharif made him suspicious. Later in the evening, when questioned by the judges about why he didn't shoot earlier if he thought al-Sharif posed a danger to others, he replied that he didn't know. He also dismissed the videos submitted as evidence.

On 23 August, senior IDF Reserves officers Uzi Dayan, Shmuel Zakai and Dan Bitton, who were set to testify on Azaria's behalf, submitted their declarations to the court, which were subsequently leaked to the public. Dayan stated that the investigation against Azaria was unjustified and that the command as well as the management of the scene should be blamed. Zakai stated that the pictures of the incident certified that the prosecution was in error, and that Azaria acted out of a reasonable concern that al-Sharif may have been carrying a bomb. He blamed IDF command for the incident, asserting that they acted contrary to instructions. He also criticized Defense Minister Moshe Ya'alon, IDF Chief of Staff, IDF Spokesperson as well as the Senior Command for their behavior after the incident, arguing that it destroyed any chance of Azaria receiving a fair trial. Dan Bitton criticized officers at the scene of the incident and argued that a "wrong verdict" will lead to a situation in which no soldier will be able to shoot to save lives. Azaria's legal team criticized the leak of their declarations and that it was done to prevent them from testifying for Azaria.

On 28 August, Eliyahu Liebman, civilian security chief for Jewish settlers in Hebron, testified. He backed Azaria's position that al-Sharif presented a threat as he was wearing a jacket on a hot day, saying that the description of "neutralized" did not apply to al-Sharif. He told the court that there was no justification for the accusations, as soldiers had shot attackers in the head in the past to stop their attacks and prevent them from detonating suicide belts. In response to his position that al-Sharif posed a threat, the prosecution showed footage of Liebman leisurely walking near al-Sharif with his back turned. Liebman responded by saying that he did not sense a clear and present danger and did not speak about it because it was not his responsibility to assume command from an army officer.

On 29 August, Azaria's platoon commander backed his position that he feared al-Sharif could detonate a suicide bomb. He also said he had warned Na'aman about the bomb threat, but that Na'aman ignored his orders and had posted a soldier to watch over al-Sharif. The prosecution questioned his remarks, stating that he did not make any such statements during the investigation and also questioned why he was standing close to al-Sharif during the incident. A police sapper who also testified on the same day stated that the body of a terrorist should be regarded as being booby-trapped until it has been inspected by bomb experts. He also stated that the bodies of stabbers shouldn't be moved until they had been inspected by explosives experts, and that their clothing was appropriate considering the weather during the incident.

On 30 August, Asher Horowitz, a member of Hebron's emergency response team, testified, stating that it was feared that al-Sharif was booby-trapped because he was wearing a jacket on a hot day. He alleged that Na'aman was a leftist who detested settlers and that his testimony was influenced by his political views.

On 31 August, defense attorneys produced a report by retired pathologist Yehuda Hiss which stated that al-Sharif had died before Azaria shot him in the head and that the movements of his hand shown in footage could have been spasms.

On 1 September, Magen David Adom (MDA) paramedic Zahi Yahav testified, saying that he had heard screams that al-Sharif might be booby-trapped and that he had escaped from the area of the incident as he genuinely feared that he could be blown up. On the same day, Azaria's deputy company commander testified and stated that he heard the brigade commander, battalion commander and the battalion commander say that Azaria was lying. He also stated the process was causing concern among the soldiers and might influence their testimonies.

On 5 September, a lieutenant in the Kfir Brigade who was not at the scene said that he found Azaria's belief that al-Sharif was wearing a suicide vest was plausible and that he therefore was justified in killing him. However, during the cross-examination, the prosecution proved that he had only heard Azaria's story after he had already gotten advice from his defense lawyer, with the lieutenant also admitting he had never encountered an explosive vest during his military career. On the same day, surgeon Dov Shimon submitted his opinion that al-Sharif did not die due to Azaria shooting him. Shimon had also requested the court to gag the publication of his name, which was denied. During the cross-examination of Shimon, the prosecutor stated Shimon was an expert in cardiology, not in forensic medicine. He also alleged that Shimon was fired from Hadassah Medical Center for submitting a false medical document in the past, which he said was the reason behind Shimon requesting a gag on the publication of his name. Shimon denied this but admitted that he had submitted a forged document to the medical center, stating it was provided to him by the Ministry of Health. He said he was persecuted by his superiors at the medical center.

On 11 September, a former chief bomb expert of Israel Police stated that although IDF was supreme in West Bank, the police's bomb squad was responsible for bomb-related issues. Another bomb expert, Ofer Ashkuri, was alleged by the prosecution to have copied his expert report from documents used by the defense. Ashkuri denied the allegation. One of Azaria's former non-commissioned officer junior commanders also testified on his behalf, stating that he was a good soldier, never lost control of his emotions and never made any comments disparaging Palestinians. He also criticized the top three commanders who testified against Azaria as treating him too harshly for making a mistake in what he described as a "chaotic terror scene" where people felt their lives were in danger. He also agreed with the defense's argument that the other soldiers felt influenced to testify against Azaria because of the actions of their commanders.

On 14 September, Ronen Bashari, the deputy director of MDA, said that the area where the shooting occurred was extremely dangerous. He also stated that there had been a change in MDA's regulations to allow a Palestinian attacker's body to be removed under IDF's order before the bomb squad arrives. Later, Yehuda Hiss testified that al-Sharif had died before being shot by Azaria. He was also critical of forensic pathologist Gips' analysis of al-Sharif's death, arguing that Gips' analysis was contradicted by medical journals and accused Gips of not performing all necessary autopsy procedures. Gips disputed Hiss' accusations while the prosecution pointed out his admitted involvement in organ harvesting. Later in the day, Yissachar Herman, a psychiatrist, testified that Azaria's judgment was impaired due to him not having slept properly before the incident. The prosecution, however, showed that Azaria had slept for eight hours the night before the incident. Herman also stated that Azaria had learning disabilities and had told him that he had trouble reading the material from his interrogation. The prosecution, however, showed the court that Azaria had completed the IDF's medic course with a score of 93.

Ex-deputy IDF chief Uzi Dayan testified on Azaria's behalf on 19 September, stating that terrorists should be killed even if they don't pose a danger. He also stated that it is up to a soldier in the field to determine whether a situation is dangerous. Reserve General Danny Bitton on the same day also said that the shooting was justified if Azaria thought he was in danger. He also stated that the military court is not able to determine whether Azaria really felt a danger and that a full military operational investigation wasn't done before the military police started investigating.

On 25 September, a soldier who was injured in the attack testified on Azaria's behalf, stating that there was a legitimate concern for explosives. The prosecution said that he didn't mention any such concern during his first testimony. The soldier acknowledged this, but commented that he, at the time, was "not at his best". He also admitted that once al-Sharif fell to the ground, he no longer viewed him as a threat. Eli Bin, the head of MDA, also testified on the same day that, according to instructions at the time of the incident, an attacker shouldn't be approached if there is a concern about explosives. He also stated that following subsequent discussions, it was decided that concern about explosives would remain until the outer clothing of the attacker had been removed. The prosecution, however, showed the video of MDA rescue worker Ofer Ohana kicking the knife towards al-Sharif's body. He also questioned the credibility and neutrality of Ben and MDA and presented evidence that some MDA employees had refused to treat Palestinians in the past because of anti-Palestinian ideology.

On 27 September, Shmuel Zakai testified on Azaria's behalf, stating that Azaria didn't shoot to kill and that the video footage proved Azaria was in danger. He opined that Azaria was afraid of a bomb while criticizing Azaria's company commander Na'aman, stating that the incident would have been avoided had he properly clarified the rules of engagement. Zakai explained that in some operational situations, orders are given that alter the rules of engagement, such as when opening fire would put IDF soldiers at risk, stating Na'aman did not give that order and left the soldier with the previous and unclear rules of engagement. He also criticized his former brigade commander, Yariv Ben-Ezra, for his orders. Mark Weiser, a psychiatrist who met with Azaria after the incident to assess his mental standing, also testified. He stated that the shooter did not suffer from PTSD, contradicting his attorney's statements. In response to Azaria's accusations that he was collaborating with the prosecution to convict him at any cost and that he had laughed at him, Weiser stated that he told Azaria he wasn't conspiring against him nor had he laughed at him, but might have smiled at him when Azaria said he wanted to harm him as he considered it humorous.

On 26 October, Yoni Bleichbard, the head of settlement security in Hebron, testified for the defense. He said that he wouldn't have reported Azaria's shooting, which he thought was justified. When questioned about Ben-Ezra's testimony that he had reported the incident as irregular, he stated that he didn't know what the commander was thinking and what he understood. He also alleged that Ben-Ezra's testimony was full of contradictions and that the scene was handled improperly, leading to the shooting. He also said that he did not remember exactly what he saw Azaria do or what he told the IDF about it. Upon being questioned by the prosecution, he said that Azaria's lawyer, Eyal Beserglick, had sought his help to "destroy the brigade commander" and he had repeatedly rejected his requests. Beserglick stated that what he said to him was terminology regarding undermining the reliability of the brigade commander. When questioned about Beserglick's message to have him court ordered as well his replies to cause a commotion and not to speak anything if he was forced to be there, he said that he did all he could not to come, as he was against the attempt to turn him into a "state liar".

Hadas Gips testified again on the same day. She maintained that Azaria's shot killed al-Sharif. Azaria's lawyers objected, citing the testimony of Yehuda Hiss. They also questioned her objectivity and her expertise, alleging that the IDF prosecution had pushed her in the direction they wanted her to go and doubting that she was an expert in the specific area of the testimony. In response to the remark that she had presented several articles to support her conclusion, she responded that she did so out of professionalism, knowing that there was a counter opinion by Hiss, but that she could have testified without submitting the articles.

The prosecution submitted its summations on 7 November. It stated that Azaria had lied in his testimony and had changed his story five times. According to the summations, Azaria had never told any of the witnesses who testified that al-Sharif posed a danger, and his motive for shooting al-Sharif was to exact revenge for him stabbing his friend. His claim of feeling threatened was an after-the-fact construction.

Azaria's lawyers submitted their summations on 20 November. It argued that he should be acquitted of all charges because his version of the events had been confirmed during the investigation. It further claimed that Azaria never told anyone that al-Sharif deserved to die and that, in any event, the shot he placed in his head followed intense pressure after a traumatic event. The summations also stated that his worry of a bomb threat was legitimate and that his commanders were the ones to blame. It also questioned whether Colonel Maya Heller, the presiding judge in the trial, could try the case objectively and accused her of being biased against Azaria.

The prosecution and the defense team delivered their closing statements on 23 November. Azaria's attorney Ilan Katz called the trial "unwarranted", stating that security forces had shot "neutralized" attackers before, but there was no trial against them. He also criticized former Defense Minister Moshe Ya'alon's remarks that Azaria had "sinned". The prosecutor Colonel Nadav Weisman stated that Azaria shot al-Sharif out of revenge, citing statements from his commanders and a fellow soldier that they heard him say al-Sharif stabbed his friend and needed to die. He further stated that acquitting him would create a dangerous precedent and his actions were illegal, and so should be convicted.

== Court verdict and sentencing ==
The verdict of the military court was scheduled for 4 January 2017. The hearing of the verdict was later relocated to IDF's headquarters in Tel Aviv due to the anticipated crowds and protesters. On 4 January, Azaria was convicted of manslaughter by a panel of three judges. The verdict was announced by Central Command Chief Justice Colonel Maya Heller. The sentencing was originally scheduled for 15 January. Channel 2 reported that the IDF had held a meeting with the shooter's father on the previous day, asking him to drop the appeal and fire their attorneys, which would be taken into consideration for a pardon. He was also reportedly offered to meet with senior IDF officials for a plea bargain. Azaria's defense team, in a letter to Lieberman, called this a criminal offense. The IDF, however, denied that they had made any such offer and stated that the meeting was held to ask his family if it needed any assistance. The defense team called the denial a lie. The court acceded to the defense team's request for postponement of sentencing discussions on 11 January, shifting it to a week and a half later.

During the sentencing hearing on 24 January, Azaria's defense team asked the court to toss out the manslaughter conviction over the alleged offer by the IDF to his father for a lenient sentence, claiming "tampering" with legal proceedings. The court rejected this request and stated that the hearings would continue but that it would revisit the allegations later. His father also appealed for lenient sentencing, asking the court to consider Azaria's service and character as well as the physical and psychological health problems being faced by the family since the trial began, stating that his son had also received death threats from Palestinians. He also stated that he had been given an offer of lenient sentencing for his son and requested the court to sentence his son to time already served in open arrest on his base. Several witnesses also testified for his character. The prosecution asked the court to sentence Azaria to a prison term of three to five years during a hearing on 31 January. It also asked that his rank to be demoted to private. Colonel Guy Hazut, commander of Kfir Brigade, stated that what Azaria had done was serious and that he should be punished, but stated that the punishment shouldn't be severe. He accepted a meeting with Azaria's father but denied he had any discussion with him about the appeal or a reduction in punishment.

On 21 February, the court delivered Azaria's sentence. Regarding Hazut's meeting with Azaria's father, it ruled that he had good intentions for the meeting even though he was misguided and thought Azaria would get less prison time if he expressed regret than if he filed an appeal. The court took Azaria's character and the situation at the time of the shooting into account, sentencing him to a prison term of one year and six months, 12 month probation thereafter, in addition to a rank demotion to private.

=== Appeal ===
Azaria filed for an appeal against the decision on 1 March. Most of his defense team also quit in protest. His father and his only remaining lawyer later said that during a meeting between Major General Sharon Afek and Azaria's main defense lawyers Ilan Katz and Eyal Besserglick, they had been threatened that if they appealed against the verdict, the IDF would file a counter-appeal for a stricter sentence. The IDF and both Katz and Besserglick denied this. The start of Azaria's sentence, scheduled for 5 March, was also postponed by the Military Court of Appeals pending the result of the appeal. The military prosecution filed an appeal on 7 March to increase the length of Azaria's sentence, which they considered to be "lenient". The first hearing of Azaria's appeal began on 3 May. In mid-July, as his military service had been completed, he was allowed to return home and remain under house arrest until his appeal was heard.

Azaria's appeal was rejected on 30 July by the military court, which also rejected a request by military prosecutors to increase the length of his sentence. Judges declared that his version of events was unreliable and were also quoted saying that the original reason for him to kill al-Sharif was revenge. Azaria appealed to IDF Chief of Staff Gadi Eizenkot for leniency on 3 August while standing by his claim that he believed al-Sharif had an explosive device. His attorneys submitted an official request to the Military Court of Appeals to delay his prison sentence until Chief of Staff Eizenkot ruled on whether to commute his sentence. Azaria's request to delay the start of his sentence was rejected on 8 August, with the court citing a 2010 ruling that a pardon request is not sufficient grounds for delaying the start of a prison term and also stated that sentences are to begin immediately after being handed down.

On September 27, Eisenkot reduced Azaria's sentence from 18 months to 14 months. Eisenkot stated that while he did not approve of his actions, he nonetheless reduced the sentence out of considerations for compassion, mercy and Azaria's combat service, and that a message had been sent to all soldiers not to act like him. Azaria submitted a pardon request to President Reuven Rivlin on October 19. Rivlin's office, however, issued a statement on November 19, saying that the appeal had been rejected, adding that he had taken into account both the offenses committed by Azaria and their circumstances.

Another pardon appeal, this time by his parents, was turned down on 24 December by the President, who stated that a new request could be made only six months after the previous decision.

=== Imprisonment and aftermath ===
Azaria began his prison term on 9 August at Prison Four. He was released on 8 May 2018 after serving nine months of his sentence following a parole board order. Azaria term was shortened by two additional days, after prison commanders granted him an early release to attend his brother's wedding, in accordance with regulations that allow for early release in such circumstances.

In accordance with a decision the IDF made in October 2017, about half of Azaria's discharge pay was withheld as a result of his conviction. Azaria, who would have originally been entitled to NIS 48,000 ($13,720), received NIS 24,000 ($6,860) instead.

In September 2026, Israeli President Isaac Herzog approved a request by Defense Minister Israel Katz to expunge Azaria's criminal record, more than a decade after the shooting and after Azaria had completed his prison sentence. Herzog's office stated that the decision took into account "the time that had passed since the shooting and the fact that Azaria had completed his sentence," and was intended to allow him to "open a new chapter in his life." The Israeli military said that Azaria "refrained from expressing remorse and taking responsibility for his actions." The decision was welcomed by National Security Minister Itamar Ben-Gvir, while human rights groups criticized it.

== Reactions ==
The shooting immediately drew widespread condemnation, including from the Israeli Defense Minister at that time, Moshe Ya'alon, and Israeli Prime Minister Benjamin Netanyahu, who called it a violation of the IDF's ethical code. Ya'alon said, "The incident is highly severe, and completely contrary to the IDF's values and its combat morals. We must not allow, even as our blood boils, such a loss of faculties and control. This incident will be dealt with in the strictest manner." Netanyahu also called criticism of the army over the shooting "outrageous". IDF Spokesperson Brigadier General Moti Almoz said it was "a very severe incident. This is not the IDF culture or the Jewish people's culture." The controversy turned into a bitter political debate, splitting Israel's right-wing government and inspiring demonstrations in Ramle and Beit Shemesh in support Azaria, whose identity had yet to be made public. Azaria has also attracted widespread support on Israeli social media, with more than 13,000 people joining Facebook support groups and another 50,000 signing a petition backing his actions. Supporters of the soldier posted a video online of the moments before the shooting, which they say was evidence the soldier was justified to fear the assailant may have had an explosive device. The two most prominent figures who have given vocal support to Azaria and his family have been the right-wing Israeli education minister, Naftali Bennett, whose "The Jewish Home" party organized the demonstration in the city of Ramle, and the former Minister of Foreign Affairs, Avigdor Lieberman. Israeli lawmakers from the center-left reacted harshly, warning of the dangers of moral decline and of loose rules of engagement in the military.

On 31 March 2016, Palestinian President Mahmoud Abbas commented on the killing in an interview with Ilana Dayan sent on Israeli TV: "This is inhumane, to shoot a living man. I don't want to blame the entire Israeli people. I know, the Israelis are human beings. They are humane. But unfortunately, we read the responses and the protests in Israel against putting the soldier on trial, against arresting him. Such statements are disturbing and frustrate us a great deal." On the same date, Netanyahu spoke with Azaria's father, stating that he understood his distress as he himself was a father of a soldier. He also reassured him that the difficult situations faced by soldiers confronting terrorists would be taken into account and that the system would be fair to his son.

On 6 April, IDF Chief of Staff Gadi Eizenkot stated during a meeting with soldiers at the Tze'elim camp that the shooting ran counter to the professional and ethical norms of behavior demanded of IDF troops.

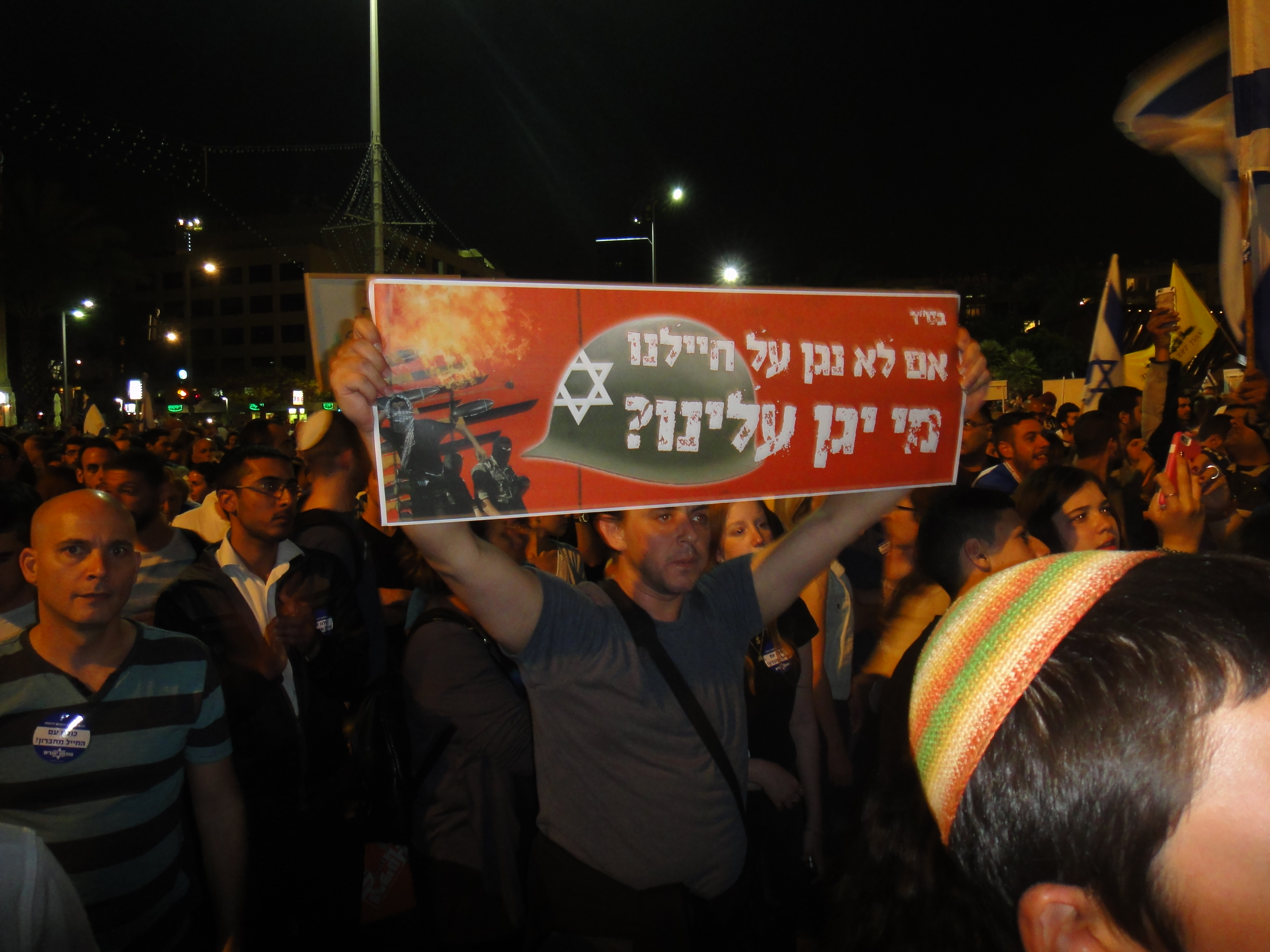
Demonstration in support of Azaria in Rabin Square. Translation of text on the poster: "If we don't protect our soldiers, who will protect us?"

A demonstration in support of Azaria was organised by his family and former Knesset member Sharon Gal in Tel Aviv's Rabin Square on 19 April. Singers Eyal Golan and David D'Or and rapper Subliminal were slated to perform at the rally. However, Golan and D'or pulled out of the rally, citing the rally becoming politicized as the reason. The organizers had hoped for a large crowd numbering tens of thousands. However, the rally drew only an estimated 2,000 people. The rally was attended by a number of pop icons, public figures and extremist figures. On 19 April, Netanyahu urged for "balance" in Azaria's trial and said that he was sure the court would act wisely in weighing Azaria's killing of al-Sharif and the context in which he did so. On 25 July, Defence Minister Avigdor Lieberman said the government must not express a stance on the shooting until the end of the trial and also criticized the earlier reaction of his predecessor Ya'alon. On 12 September, Lieberman stated that he would support Azaria even if he was convicted and urged the court to "ignore the noise" and judge according to the facts.

During an interview with Channel 2 News, Netanyahu stated he had no regrets about calling Azaria's parents. When questioned whether he had made telephone calls to parents of other soldiers who had transgressed, he replied that he hadn't but had talked to those parents of soldiers who were killed or missing. Netanyahu was criticized by opposition politicians and the media for comparing the parents of fallen soldiers to parents of soldiers charged with criminal conduct, like Azaria's. The Prime Minister's Office later issued a statement rejecting these remarks and called them a "base, distorted and lying" misrepresentation. Netanyahu himself also denied these accusations, saying his words had been misunderstood or misinterpreted.

On 8 October, Bennett called for an immediate pardon of Azaria if convicted because it was important to back soldiers in their efforts to "protect Israel from terrorists". He also raised doubts that Azaria was receiving a fair trial. His statements were criticized by Zionist Union MK Eyal Ben-Reuven as well as Yesh Atid MK Elazar Stern, both former soldiers.

Moti Almoz, in response to criticism leveled at him for his statements regarding the incident, stated on 14 November that he had no regrets about denouncing Azaria. He defended the handling of the incident by senior IDF officers, stating it couldn't have remained within the army. He also criticized Israeli politicians who had criticized the IDF for putting Azaria on trial.

On 28 December, former defense minister Moshe Ya'alon criticized politicians who praised Azaria and attacked him, Netanyahu, and the IDF. He also criticized Netanyahu for switching his opinion about the shooting and "embracing" Azaria. He also condemned Azaria's actions during the incident.

On 1 January 2017, Azaria's defense team wrote a letter to Lieberman in which it asked for a state investigation into the trial, arguing that due process had been compromised. They cited public comments made after the shooting by IDF Chief of Staff Eizenkot, the IDF Spokesperson's Unit and then-Defense Minister Moshe Ya'alon, as well as the fact that Azaria was not present for the preliminary operational review following the incident. They also stated that an unnamed senior military official who was quoted by Channel 10 News as saying that Azaria would be convicted was the Military Advocate General, who was trying to influence the decision of the judges. The IDF Spokesperson's Unit rejected these accusations as baseless and incorrect while military officials stated that the Military Advocate General Sharon Afek had never made any such comments.

Human Rights Watch blamed Israeli officials for the incident on 2 January, stating that they encouraged soldiers and police officers to kill Palestinians they suspect of attacking Israelis even when they no longer pose a threat.

On 3 January, Eizenkot criticized those depicting the shooter as a "confused little kid", saying this demeaned the army's character. Former IDF Chief of Staff Benny Gantz as well as 53 reserve battalion commander supported his statements.

After the verdict was announced, many Israeli politicians including Netanyahu called for Azaria to be pardoned while others accused the Israeli military of "abandoning" him. Protests also erupted outside the courthouse in response to the verdict. The Palestinian Authority meanwhile called the trial "farcical", alleging that the Israeli government was trying to "deflect attention from its wide crimes." The Palestinian cameraman who recorded the incident stated that he had received threats to his life and was attacked by Israeli settlers. After reports emerged that some soldiers at the scene of the January 2017 Jerusalem truck attack had fled and hesitated in firing at the truck, some right-wing commenters alleged that they hadn't quickly responded because of the court verdict given in Azaria's case, fearing they would face similar punishment. The IDF, however, stated that at least two soldiers fired at the attacker, and denied a connection between troops' response to the case, as did a cadet who was present at the incident. Dozens of people illegally protested against the conviction outside the residence of the President of Israel on 8 January. At least seven protesters were arrested for public order offenses.

General Eyal Zamir, head of Southern Command, stated on 10 January at the Haifa Leadership Conference that Azaria committed a criminal offense, but it was a threshold. He also stated the IDF couldn't compromise its values or it will lose its morality. Colonel Nimrod Aloni, commander of Paratroopers Brigade, reiterated the need to follow the rules of engagement at the forum. Defense Minister Lieberman later called on people to calm down regarding the verdict while telling them to remember that Azaria is an excellent soldier and that al-Sharif was a terrorist who came to murder Jews. He also stated that everything was being done to guard the IDF's values and Azaria.

After the sentencing, several ministers called for Azaria to be pardoned. Meanwhile, al-Sharif's father criticized the sentence as a "joke", his family stating that Palestinians were jailed longer for stone-throwing. Protests continued outside the courthouse as Azaria was sentenced. Netanyahu also backed a pardon for Azaria, saying that it is important to consider the "challenging circumstances" young soldiers face. Some human rights organisations and Palestinian leaders criticized the sentencing as overly lenient. The Arab League also criticized the length of the sentence, alleging it showed "racism", while Office of the United Nations High Commissioner for Human Rights called it "excessively lenient" and "unacceptable". On 12 March, revelers in a Hebron settlement paid tribute to Azaria during a parade organized to commemorate Purim.

In 2024 the United States imposed visa restrictions on Azaria and his family, blocking them from entry into the United States. State Department spokesperson Matthew Miller explained that the restrictions were imposed for "gross violations of human rights."
