= Danny Efroni =

Chief Military Advocate General of the Israel Defense Forces

- דני עפרוני
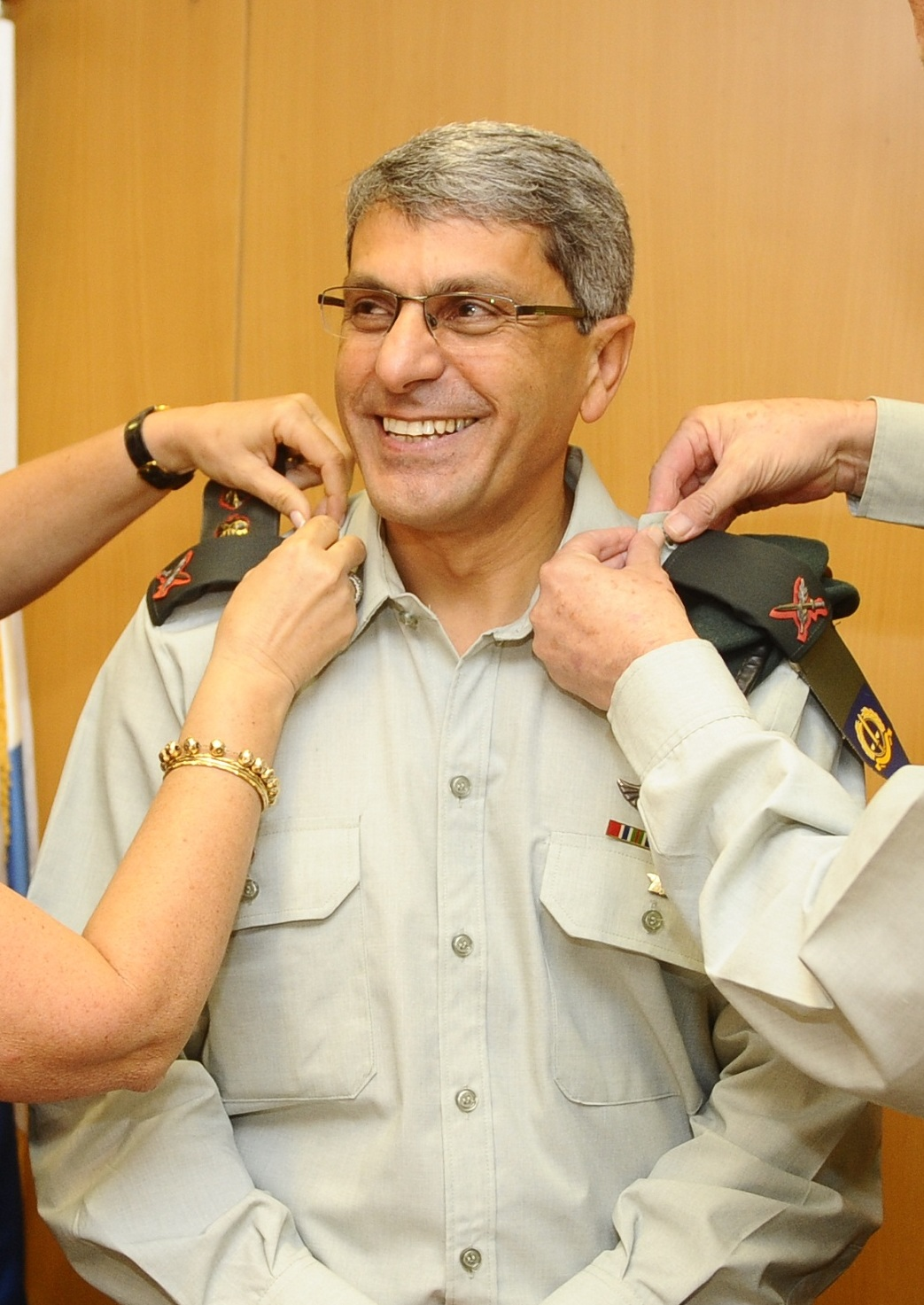
- Born: 17 November 1958 (age 67)
- Military career
- Allegiance: Israel
- Service years: 1976–2009, 2011–2015
- Rank: Aluf (major general)
- Unit: Military Advocate General
- Conflicts: 1982 Lebanon War, First Intifada, al-Aqsa Intifada, Second Lebanon War, Operation Protective Edge

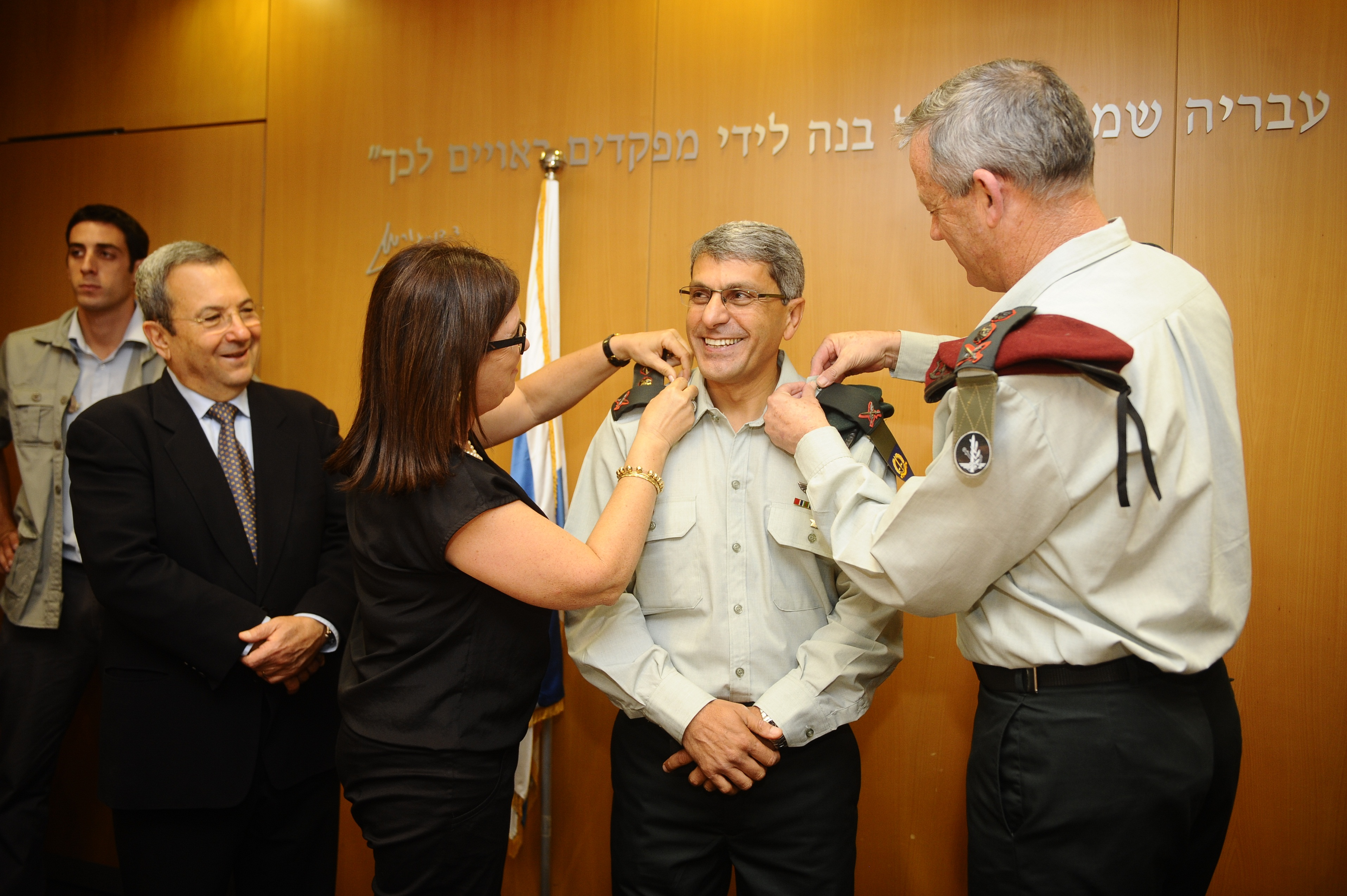
Danny Efroni being promoted to the rank of Tat Aluf (September 15, 2011)

Danny Efroni (Hebrew: דני עפרוני; born November 17, 1958) was the Chief Military Advocate General of the Israel Defense Forces in 2011-2015.

== Military and legal career ==
Danny Efroni was drafted into the Israel Defense Forces in 1976, after graduating from the Hebrew Reali School of Haifa. He served in an operational unit in the Intelligence Directorate.

In 1990, after receiving his law degree from Tel Aviv University School of Law, Efroni joined the Military Advocate General as a military prosecutor in the West Bank. In 1993 he returned to the Intelligence Directorate to head a regional branch of the operational unit he served in previously.

In 1996, Efroni returned to the service in the Military Advocate General. He fulfilled the positions of the Deputy Chief Military Prosecutor (1996–2000), the District Attorney for the Northern Command (2000–2003) and the Chief Military Defense Attorney (2003–2004). In 2004, he was appointed Deputy Military Advocate General.

In 2009, Efroni retired from the army, but returned to service in August 2011 when he was named successor to Chief Military Advocate General Avichai Mandelblit.

On September 15, 2011, Efroni was promoted to the rank of Tat Aluf (brigadier general) and appointed Chief Military Advocate General. The appointment was announced in August 2011.

On September 27, 2012, he was promoted to the rank of Aluf (major general).

On October 22, 2015, Efroni was succeeded as Chief Military Advocate General by brigadier general Sharon Afek.
