= Alex Stein =

Alex Stein may refer to:

- Alex Stein (comedian) (born 1986), American right-wing YouTube personality and comedian
- Alex Stein (judge) (born 1957), Israeli jurist and law professor

== See also ==
- Alexander Stein (1906–1993), Soviet Russian writer
