= Uri Shoham =

Israeli judge

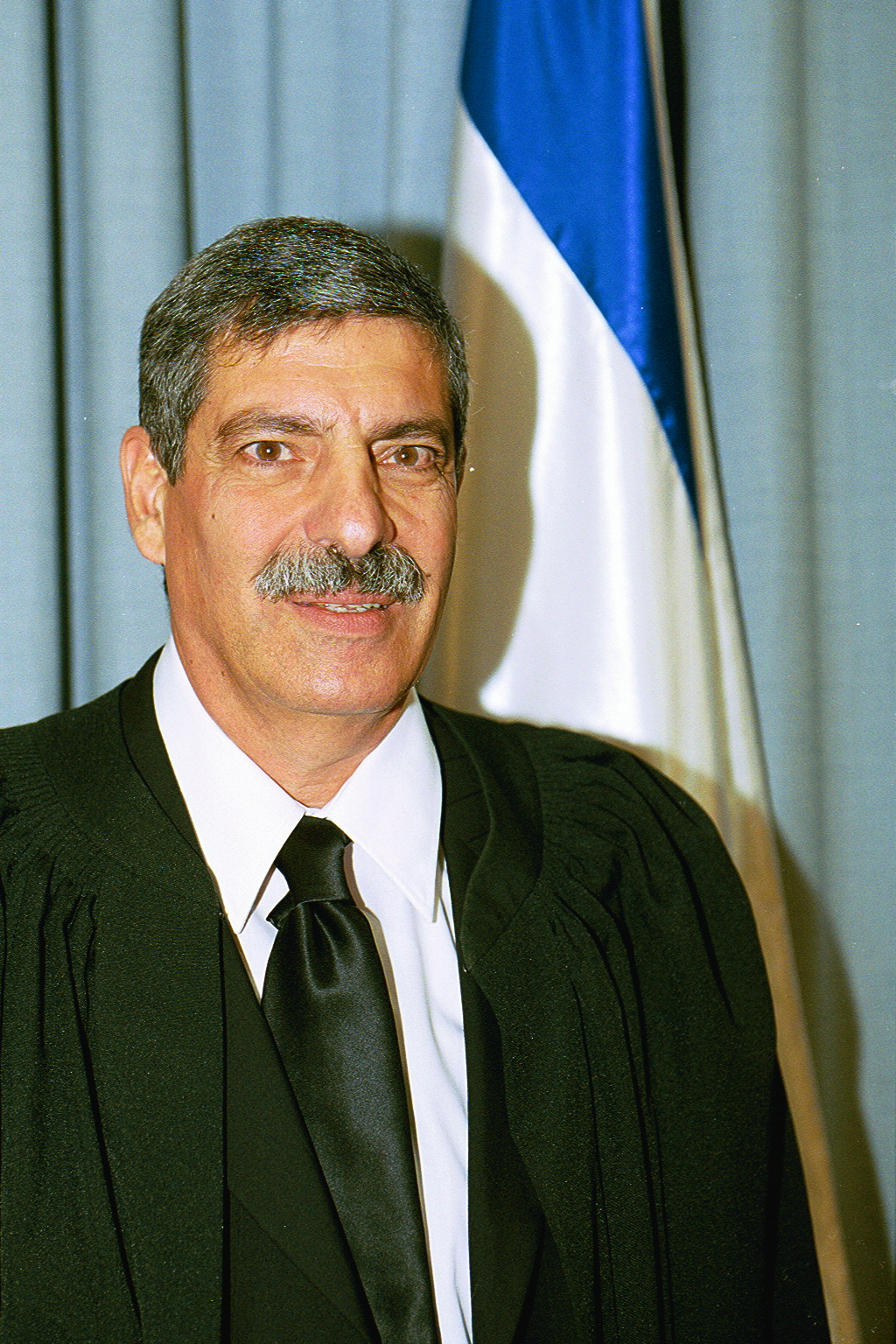
Uri Shoham

Uri Shoham (Hebrew: אורי שהם; August 3, 1948) is a judge on the Supreme Court of Israel. He previously served as a district court judge in Tel-Aviv and a Judge Advocate General. His appointment to the court was viewed as a victory for Mizrahi Jews, as the court had consisted largely of judges of Ashkenazi descent.

== Early life and education ==
Shoham was born in Iraq on 3 August 1948 and moved to Israel with his family in 1951. He grew up in Tel Aviv and attended the Ironi Dalet High School. In 1966, he began his military service in the Israel Defense Forces as part of the Atuda program, serving in the Combat Engineering Corps. In 1971, he received a BA in law from the Hebrew University of Jerusalem, and received a law license in 1975. In 1977, he received a master's degree in law from the Hebrew University of Jerusalem.

== Career ==
He served in the Military Advocate General's office of the IDF in a number of positions, including as a judge and prosecutor in the IDF legal system. He served as President of the Military Court of Appeals for the Judea, Samaria, and Gaza Areas, was Chief Military Prosecutor from 1995 to 2000, and then served as Deputy President of the Military Court of Appeals. He completed his military service with the rank of Brigadier General.

In September 2001, he was appointed a judge on the Tel Aviv District Court. While serving in this position in 2009, he imposed several long sentences on members of organized crime groups. Shoham was threatened by the crime groups, and he was given increased security by the police. He was appointed to the Supreme Court in 2012.

== Personal life ==
Shoham is married with two daughters.
