= Elor =

Elor is a given name and surname. Notable people with the name include:

- Amit Elor (born 2004), American freestyle wrestler, 2024 Olympic champion and 8x world champion
- Elor Azaria, IDF soldier found guilty in the killing of Abdel Fattah al-Sharif
