= Avichai Mandelblit =

Israeli jurist and military officer (born 1963)

- אביחי מנדלבליט
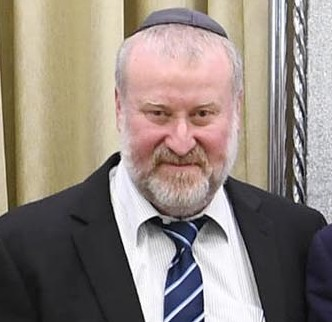

14th Attorney General of Israel
- In office 1 February 2016 – 1 February 2022
- Prime Minister: Benjamin Netanyahu; Naftali Bennett
- Preceded by: Yehuda Weinstein
- Succeeded by: Gali Baharav-Miara

17th Cabinet Secretary
- In office 29 April 2013 – 1 February 2016
- Prime Minister: Benjamin Netanyahu
- Preceded by: Zvi Hauser

Personal details
- Born: 29 July 1963 (age 63) Tel Aviv, Israel
- Spouse: Ronit
- Education: Tel Aviv University; Bar-Ilan University

Military service
- Allegiance: Israel
- Branch/service: Israeli Army
- Years of service: 1985–2011
- Rank: Aluf (Major general)
- Commands: Military Advocate General
- Battles/wars: First Intifada; Second Intifada; Second Lebanon War; Operation Cast Lead

Avichai Mandelblit (Hebrew: אביחי מנדלבליט; born 29 July 1963) is an Israeli jurist who served as the Attorney General of Israel from 2016 to 2022. Mandelblit had a long career in the Israel Defense Forces legal system, eventually serving as the Chief Military Advocate General between 2004 and 2011. In April 2013, he was appointed Cabinet Secretary. In February 2016, he was appointed Attorney General. In November 2019, following a three-year investigation, Mandelblit formally indicted Israel's sitting prime minister Benjamin Netanyahu on three charges of fraud and breach of trust, and one charge of bribery.

== Early life ==
Avichai Mandelblit was born and raised in Tel Aviv. His parents were Baruch (Mickey) and Ada Mandelblit. His father, a clothing merchant and deputy head of the Israel Football Association, was an Irgun veteran and member of the right-wing Herut party. At age 26, Mandelblit became an Orthodox Jew and a disciple of rabbi Baruch Ashlag.

Mandelblit postponed his mandatory military service in the Israel Defense Forces to attend Tel Aviv University as part of the Atuda program. He joined the IDF in 1985, after graduating with a bachelor's degree in law. He later earned a Ph.D. in law from Bar-Ilan University.

== Military career ==
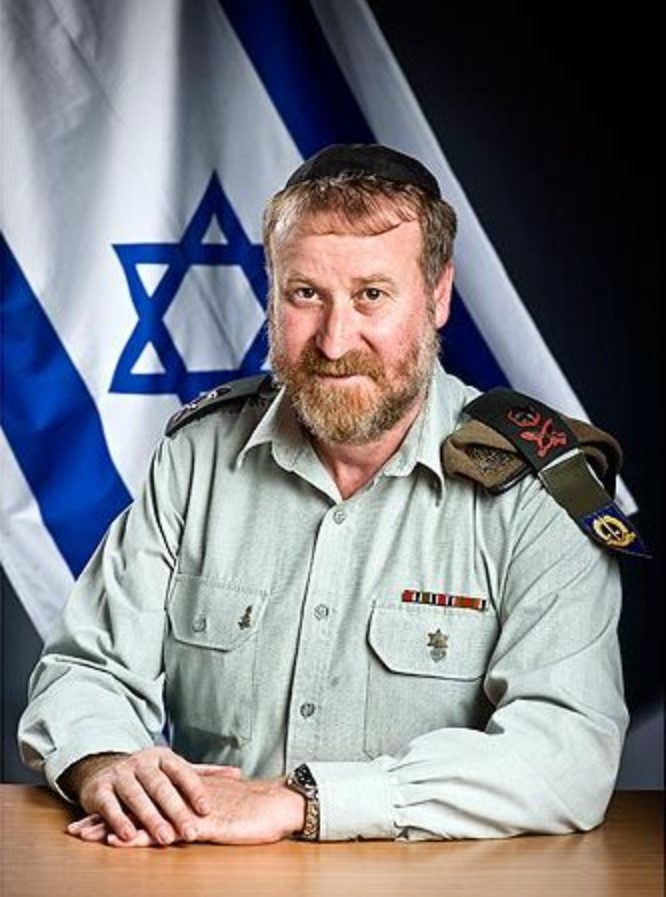
Mandelblit during his time as Military Advocate General

Upon joining the IDF, he held a variety of positions in the Military Advocate General's Office. Between 1991 and 1992, he served as a judge on the Military Court of the Gaza region. In 1993, he was appointed senior assistant to the Chief Military Prosecutor, and later became his deputy. In 1997, he was appointed Deputy President of the Military Court of the Southern Command and the Ground Forces. In 2000, he was appointed as the Head of the Chief Military Defense, and, in 2003, as the Deputy Military Advocate General. In 2004, he was promoted to the rank of Tat Aluf (Brigadier General) and appointed as the Chief Military Advocate General. In 2009, he was promoted to the rank of Aluf.

During his service as the Chief Military Advocate General, Mandelblit frequently expressed the IDF's legal viewpoint upon different issues of the international humanitarian law. In December 2007, he declared that the IDF's use of cluster bombs during the Second Lebanon War complied with international humanitarian law. He was also among the harsh critics of the Goldstone Report, stating:

We ourselves set up investigations into 140 complaints. It is when you read these other reports and complaints that you realize how truly vicious the Goldstone report is. He made it look like we set out to go after the economic infrastructure and civilians, that it was intentional. It's a vicious lie.

— Avichai Mandelblit

On 15 September 2011, Mandelblit was succeeded as the Chief Military Advocate General by Danny Efroni.

== Cabinet Secretary ==
After retiring from the military in 2011, Mandelblit served until 2013 as a researcher at the Institute for National Security Studies.

In 2013, Prime Minister Benjamin Netanyahu appointed Mandelblit to the post of Cabinet Secretary which he served during the thirty-third government of Israel and the beginning of thirty-fourth government of Israel. During this role he was in charge of establishing the Kotel compromise.

== Attorney General of Israel ==
Mandelblit was appointed Attorney General of Israel in 2016, with the support of Netanyahu and his Justice Minister Ayelet Shaked.

As attorney general, Mandelblit gained "a reputation as a meticulous legalist" who prioritizes the rule of law; although a longtime member of the Likud party, Mandelblit was described by colleagues and friends as an apolitical attorney general whose decisionmaking is not colored by political considerations. He opposed Section 7 of the proposed nation-state law, which would have allowed Jewish communal settlements to refuse to accept non-Jewish residents. After his retirement as attorney-general, he became a critic of the government's proposed judicial overhaul, stating that it threatens Israel's liberal democratic system.

As of June 2020, Mandelblit is also serving as acting State Attorney because the entering Justice Minister Avi Nissenkorn has yet to appoint a new State Attorney to succeed Shai Nitzan. The High Court approved this arrangement.

=== Indictment of Netanyahu ===
Although Mandelblit had a close working relationship with Netanyahu dating back to Mandelblit's time as IDF's Military Advocate General, Mandelblit pursued criminal probes into Netanyahu relating to allegations of corruption by the prime minister and his associates. In July 2016, Mandelblit opened an initial review of Netanyahu's conduct in an unspecified case, and was criticized by some on the left who viewed Mandelblit as protecting the prime minister. In January 2017, Mandelblit approved law enforcement questioning of Netanyahu in connection with Case 1000 (an inquiry into allegedly illegal gifts). After the separate Case 2000 (Yediot Aharonot–Israel Hayom affair) against Netanyahu emerged, Mandelblit moved slowly on the case. In September 2017, Mandelblit indicted the prime minister's wife, Sara Netanyahu; as part of a plea agreement, Sara Netanyahu was ordered to pay the equivalent of US$15,000.

In February 2018, police recommended that Prime Minister Netanyahu be indicted for bribery in cases 1000 and 2000. Later that year, another case, the Bezeq–Walla! affair Case 4000 emerged, and the prime minister fell under suspicion after his former allies Shlomo Filber and Nir Hefetz, turned state's evidence and became witnesses against Netanyahu. In December 2018, after State Prosecutor Shai Nitzan recommended that Netanyahu be indicted, Mandelblit announced that he would "work quickly" to decide whether to indict Netanyahu. Mandelblit said he would not act "at the expense of quality decisions and professionalism" and "would not be influenced by anything other than the evidence and the law".

In February 2019, Mandelblit announced he had accepted police recommendations to indict Netanyahu on three charges and that an indictment would be formally issued following a hearing. Contested pre-indictment hearings concluded in October 2019.

On 21 November 2019, Mandelblit indicted Netanyahu on charges of bribery, fraud, and breach of trust (in connection with Case 4000) and fraud and breach of public trust (in connection with Case 1000 and Case 2000). At the same time, Mandelblit indicted Yedioth Ahronoth owner Arnon Mozes on a bribery charge and Bezeq-Walla! owner Shaul Elovitch and his wife Iris on charges of bribery and obstruction of justice.

== Mandelblit tapes ==
On 13 October 2020, Amit Segal had leaked an audio talk of Madelblit that implied that Madelblit was blackmailed, and that he got a tailored case against him.

On 14 October 2020 The Times of Israel had reported that "The release of the tapes by Channel 12 on Tuesday was seen by allies of Netanyahu—whom Mandelblit indicted on corruption charges earlier this year—as supporting an unsubstantiated conspiracy theory that the attorney general had been blackmailed by the state attorney, prosecutors and police into filing the charges as part of a 'witch hunt' aimed at ousting the premier. The newly aired recordings, while highlighting a beef between Mandelblit and Nitzan years before the Netanyahu investigations began, do not provide evidence for any such blackmail."

== Personal life ==
Mandelblit lives in Petah Tikva with his wife and six children.
