= Harry Trusted =

British Colonial Attorney-General

Sir Harry Herbert Trusted QC
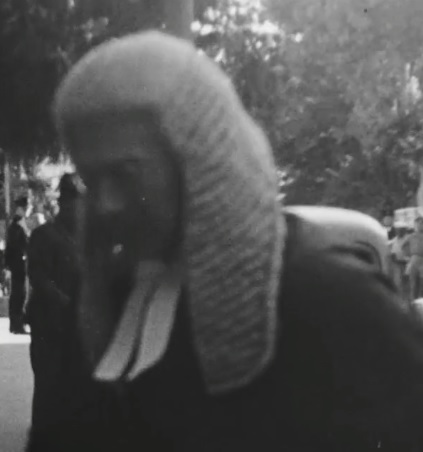

Attorney General of the Leeward Islands
- In office 1927–1929

Personal details
- Born: 27 June 1888 Birmingham, England
- Died: 8 December 1985 (aged 97) Surrey, England
- Spouse: Mary Warmington (m. 1911; died 1983)
- Parent: Rev. Wilson Trusted (father)
- Relatives: Sir Marshall Warmington (Father-in-law)
- Education: Ellesmere College; Trinity Hall, Cambridge
- Occupation: Attorney-General

Sir Harry Herbert Trusted QC (27 June 1888 – 8 December 1985) was a British colonial Attorney-General and Chief Justice.

== Education ==
Trusted was educated at Ellesmere College and Trinity Hall, Cambridge. He studied law at the Inner Temple, but joined the Middle Temple on 31 January 1911, withdrawing Middle Temple in 1913.

== Career ==
Trusted was called to the bar in 1911 at Inner Temple and served overseas in the Duke of Cornwall's Light Infantry during the First World War (1914–1918).

In 1925 he was appointed a Puisne Judge in the Leeward Islands Supreme Court, becoming Attorney-General in 1927. In 1929 he was transferred to be Attorney-General of Cyprus.

From 1932 to 1936 he served as Attorney-General of the British Mandate for Palestine, then replaced Michael McDonnell as Chief Justice in 1936. As Chief Justice he is remembered for granting additional powers to the Bedouin Tribal Courts on condition they abandoned the practice of ordeal by fire (Bish'a). In January 1938, he presided over the murder trial of Mordechai Schwarcz, a Jewish Palestine Police Force officer who had murdered an Arab police officer. He found Schwarcz guilty of murder and sentenced him to death by hanging. Schwarcz was executed later that year, becoming the only Jew to be executed for murdering an Arab during the Mandate era.

In 1941 he moved to be Chief Justice of the Federated Malay States, which lasted until 1946. For much of that time he was a Prisoner of War of the invading Japanese army.

In 1948 he chaired a Commission of Inquiry into the anti-Jewish riots in the British Protectorate of Aden.

== Personal life ==
Trusted was born in Birmingham, the only son of the Rev. Wilson Trusted of Salisbury in 1888.

He had married Mary Warmington, daughter of Sir Marshall Warmington, 1st Baronet. They had 2 sons and 3 daughters. His son John Marshall Trusted died at 21.

He died in Surrey in 1985.

== Honour ==
Trusted was knighted in 1938.
