= Military Advocate General =

Israeli military legal unit

Military Advocate General logo

The Military Advocate General (MAG Corps') (Hebrew: הפרקליטות הצבאית, HaPraklitut HaTzva'it) is responsible for implementing the rule of law within the Israel Defense Forces. The unit's objectives include integrating the rule of law amongst IDF commanders and soldiers; providing commanders with the tools for the effective performance of their missions in accordance with the law; and working with the IDF to achieve its goals on all legal fronts. The MAG Corps has the ability to provide legal advice in emergencies and during warfare.

The Military Advocate General's Corps (MAG Corps) was founded prior to the establishment of the State of Israel as the "Legal Service" within Haganah. The MAG Corps, as it is today, was established in 1948 concurrent with the IDF, as the "Military Prosecution". In 1950, the unit was renamed the Military Advocate General's Corps.

Since 2015, the Military Advocate General holds the biannual IDF International Conference on LOAC. The conference brings together world-renowned academics and practitioners (governmental and otherwise) from around the world to discuss pertinent issues in LOAC.

== Overview ==
The principal activities of the Military Advocate General are:

- Maintaining prosecution and legal defense systems before the military tribunals.
- Providing military authorities with legal advice on military law and the law in general (including international law).
- Maintaining the military tribunal system in areas falling under the jurisdiction of the IDF.
- Supervision over the rules of conduct in the IDF.
- Supervision over the investigatory arms in the IDF and over the military detention centers.
- Representing the IDF before public and institutional bodies.
- Teaching law and jurisprudence in the IDF and its values among soldiers and commanders.

== Departments ==
The Military Advocate General consists of the following bodies:

=== International Law Department ===
Head of the service, Aluf Yifat Tomer-Yerushalmi; a member of the General Staff, but not professionally subordinate to the Chief of Staff.

=== Legal Advice and Legislate Affairs Department ===
Coordinates and directs the CMAG Command; serves as acting CMAG during the Chief's absence.

=== Military Prosecution ===
Headed by the Chief Military Prosecutor, they are responsible for criminal prosecution. The Chief Military Prosecutor has exclusive authority to submit appeals to the Military Court of Appeals over rulings rendered by the District Military Tribunals.

The Military Prosecution is responsible for upholding the rule of law in the IDF by enforcing the law against IDF soldiers that have committed offences under the jurisdiction of the military justice system. Additionally, the Military Prosecution is responsible for prosecuting residents of the West Bank that have violated the law and are under the jurisdiction of the Military Courts.

Officers in the Military Prosecution handle cases that concern offences that have occurred within the military context or have a military service nexus. In addition, they also handle cases concerning crimes that are unique to the military legal system, such as absenteeism.

=== Military Defense ===
Responsible for defending soldiers and officers before the military tribunals, during appeals to the Military Court of Appeals, and providing representation and legal advice to members of the military while they undergo an investigation.

The Military Defense specializes in the defense of soldiers in military-criminal law, and consists of dozens of enlisted defense lawyers working in each district of the Military Courts, as well as numerous lawyers serving in reserve duty. The military defenders handle thousands of cases annually dealing with a variety of offences in the military justice system, and assist soldiers and commanders throughout legal and related proceedings.

=== Legal Supervision and Doctrine Branch ===
Composed of three departments: The Administrative Justice Dept. oversees administrative conduct and provides legal advice on areas related to administrative law. The Amnesty Dept. centralizes amnesty appeals to the President, provides legal opinion to the Chief of Staff as an authority confirming verdicts and sentences (including their reductions), provides legal advice to the committee for erasing the criminal records of soldiers prior to their recruitment, handles prisoner releases in the framework of peace agreements, and treats appeals to the Supreme Court. The Supervisory Dept. attends to criticisms of MAG bodies, and coordinates its activities with investigatory entities outside the IDF.

=== Department of the Legal Advisor to the Region of Judea and Samaria ===
The legal advisor in the Israeli-occupied West Bank, referred to as the Israeli district name of Judea and Samaria Area, is charged with providing legal advice regarding military activities and military administration to the military commander of the West Bank and to the head of the civil administration. In that role, the division has a difficult task in balancing security interests with humanitarian concerns and plays an active role in settling disputes between Israelis and Palestinians.

The division provides legal advice on various aspects of security measures, planning and zoning, land registration, economic activity, municipal governance, etc. The division plays a major part in the financial war against terrorist organizations in both seizing terror-related funds and the tracking and arresting of individuals involved in those activities. The division plays a central role in planning the route, determining passage arrangements, as well as petitions to the High Court of Justice and compensation issues relating to the Security Barrier.

=== School of Military Law ===
The School of Military Law is responsible for providing training in the IDF on matters of military law and for the professional development of those serving in the MAG Corps. The School of Military Law trains and accredits IDF officers to conduct disciplinary proceedings, and supervises disciplinary proceedings in the IDF. The School of Military Law coordinates the process for requests by soldiers for pardons or sentence reduction.

The legal training provided by the School of Military Law to IDF commanders and soldiers include in-depth studies of military law, analysis of real events and lessons-learned, practical workshops, the use of advanced training methods and conducting certification courses. The primary topics covered in these trainings are the areas of international law relevant to IDF activity and other legal issues relating to IDF activities, such as command responsibility. The School of Military Law also operates the Military Training and Exercise Administration, the purpose of which is to challenge IDF commanders with the legal aspects of operational scenarios during trainings and exercises that take place in the IDF.

The School of Military Law is responsible for training and accrediting officers and soldiers in the MAG Corps, upon their arrival to the unit and throughout their service. For decades, the School of Military Law has run the Legal Officer Training Course, which constitutes the MAG Corps' accreditation course and is the flagship course for MAG Corps officers. This course is the bridge between legal studies in university and the military context, and prepares dozens of new officers annually for the challenges they will face in their new roles as they join the ranks of the MAG Corps. The School of Military Law provides advanced command and management courses for officers, a course for soldiers serving as legal assistants, and more. The School of Military Law runs continued legal education courses, professional seminars and conferences.

The School of Military Law responsibility extends to training and accrediting officers to be able to adjudicate disciplinary hearings for soldiers ("disciplinary officers"). The School of Military Law trains all officers in the IDF to become "disciplinary officers", and conducts specialized training for senior officers and officers who are appointed to adjudicate special offences.

The School of Military Law provides ongoing instruction and advice to commanders and soldiers with respect to disciplinary proceedings, among others, through a designated call center. The School of Military Law provides regular advice to commanders regarding their authorities and particular disciplinary proceedings. The School of Military Law provides information to soldiers regarding their rights and provides them with the option to ask questions regarding their particular disciplinary proceedings.

The School of Military Law coordinates the supervision of disciplinary proceedings in the IDF on behalf of the Deputy Military Advocate General. The School of Military Law assists the Deputy Military Advocate General in examining claims by soldiers with respect to the standard of the disciplinary proceedings conducted against them, and to deal with cases that require intervention, including invalidating proceedings or ordering a new hearing. This is all done in accordance with the authority conferred to the Deputy Military Advocate General pursuant to Military Justice Law.

The School of Military Law arranges filing requests for pardons or sentence mitigation by soldiers to the President of the State of Israel. In this context, the School of Military Law handles such requests by soldiers convicted in the Military Courts, and assists a committee headed by the Chief Education Officer, which considers requests to expunge the criminal records of soldiers who were convicted prior to his or her enlistment in the IDF.

The School of Military Law operates the Secretariat of the Military Committee for Sentencing Review. This committee, headed by a military judge, is authorized to reduce a soldier's prison sentence, as per considerations provided in the law, which include the soldier's behavior during his or her term in prison, the chances for the soldier's rehabilitation, as well as other unique military considerations.

== List of chief military advocates general ==
Following is a list of the chief military advocates general of Israel. Before the position was created, the head of the IDF's justice division—called the military prosecution—was Avraham Gorali.

No.	Portrait	Chief Military Advocate General	Took office	Left office
1	Aharon Hoter-Yishai	Aharon Hoter-Yishai	1948	1950
2	Aharon Moyal [he]	Aharon Moyal	1950	1953
3	Meir Zohar [he]	Meir Zohar	1953	1961
4	Meir Shamgar	Meir Shamgar	1961	1968
5	Tzvi Hadar [he]	Tzvi Hadar	1968	1973
6	Tzvi Inbar [he]	Tzvi Inbar	1973	1979
7	Dov Shefi [he]	Dov Shefi	1979	1984
8	Ben-Tziyon Farkhi [he]	Ben-Tziyon Farkhi	1984	1986
9	Amnon Straschnov	Amnon Straschnov	1986	1991
10	Ilan Schiff [he]	Ilan Schiff	1991	1995
11	Uri Shoham	Uri Shoham	1995	2000
12	Menachem Finkelstein	Menachem Finkelstein	2000	2004
13	Avichai Mandelblit	Avichai Mandelblit	2004	2011
14	Danny Efroni	Danny Efroni	2011	2015
15	Sharon Afek	Sharon Afek	2015	2021
16	Yifat Tomer-Yerushalmi	Yifat Tomer-Yerushalmi	2021	2025
17	Itay Offir [he]	Itay Offir	2025	

== Notable MAG Alumni ==
The Military Advocate General alumni list includes many former officers who are leaders in their respective fields, among them: Meir Shamgar, Uri Shoham, Pnina Sharvit-Baruch, Joel Singer, Roy Schöndorf, Daniel Reisner, and Prof. Gabriella Blum.

== Reception ==
=== Human rights investigations ===
Israeli human rights organization B'Tselem has expressed strong criticism towards the Israeli military's investigative mechanisms managed by the MAG. As a result of what B'Tselem describes as a history of ineffective investigations that fail to hold senior officials accountable and often result in a whitewash of alleged misconduct, B'Tselem no longer files requests for investigations with the MAG.

The investigative mechanisms within the Israeli military, as described by B'Tselem, reveal significant structural issues that potentially hinder accountability for top political and military officials. The Military Advocate General (MAG), who plays a crucial role in this system, is tasked with both advising the military on legal matters during combat and making decisions about prosecuting violations of the law. This dual responsibility creates a conflict of interest, especially when unlawful actions stem from directives that the MAG has approved.

These investigations typically focus only on the actions of individual soldiers on the ground, rather than examining broader policy decisions or political and military officials responsible for these directives. Additionally, these investigations are often seriously delayed and follow operational inquiries that might allow soldiers to synchronize their testimonies, potentially compromising the integrity of the findings. The MPIU also frequently lacks direct access to the incident sites, which can further impede comprehensive and effective investigations.

=== Military personnel ===
In remarks related to the Gaza war, retired commander Herzi Halevi said that military AG Yifat Tomer-Yerushalmi did not have authority to restrict his actions. He further clarified that military legal advisers had assured him they would defend his decisions.

== See also ==
- Judge Advocate General
