= Avraham Gorali =

Israeli military lawyer (1911–1954)

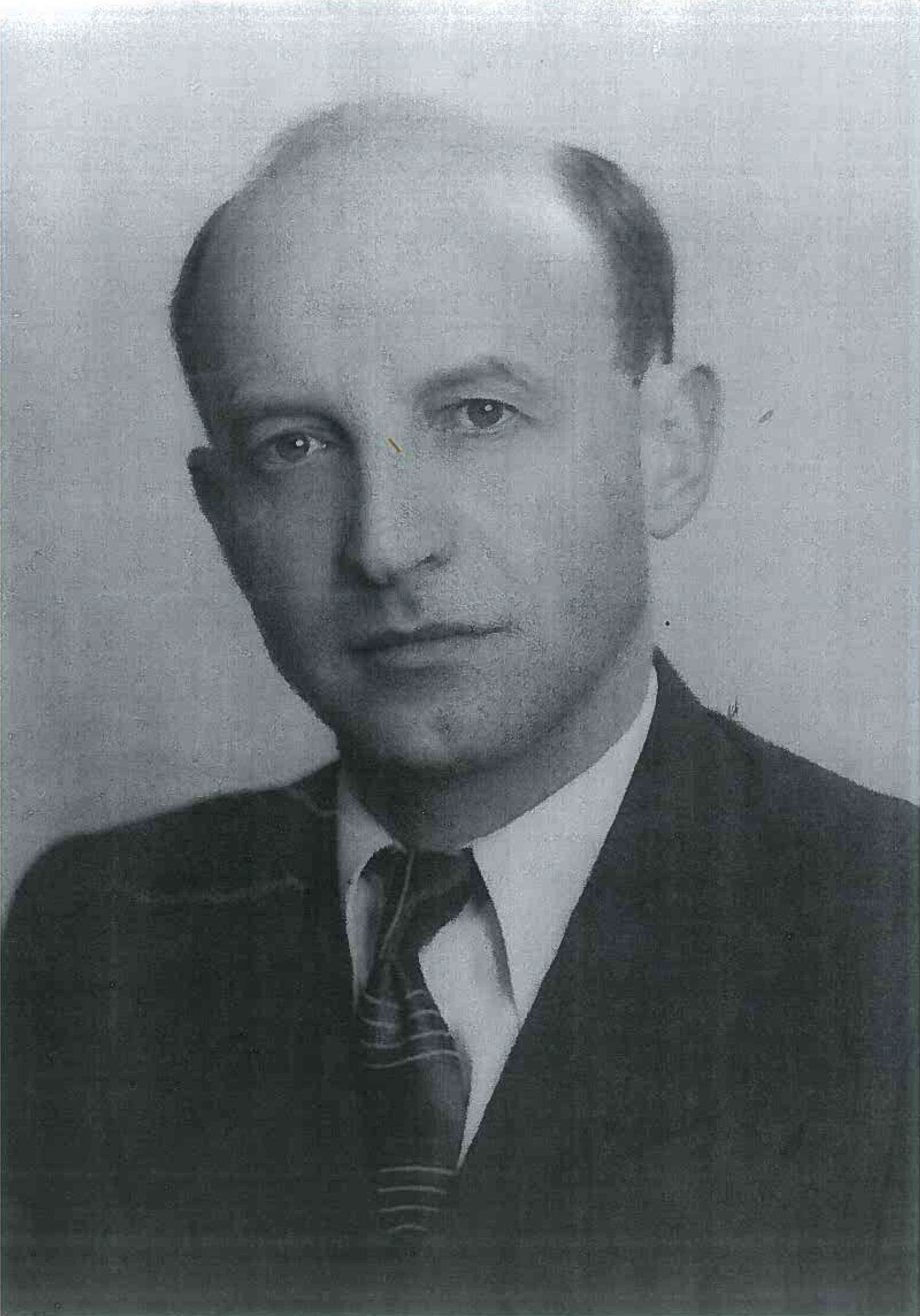
Avraham Gorali portrait c. 1950

Avraham Gorali (Hebrew: אברהם גורלי; October 15, 1911 – October 11, 1954) was the first Chief Military Prosecutor of Israel. He helped formulate Israel military justice. He was succeeded by Aharon Hoter-Yishai.

== Biography ==
Avraham Gorali was born in Kovel, Poland and studied law in Vilna. In 1934, he moved to Mandate Palestine. He worked as research assistant at Hebrew University where his received his doctorate.

In 1954, he was killed in a road accident.

== Legal career ==
Gorali founded the Law Library Publishing House. From 1936, he handled the cases of Haganah prisoners in British prison and their release.
