= Amnon Straschnov =

Israeli judge

- אמנון סטרשנוב
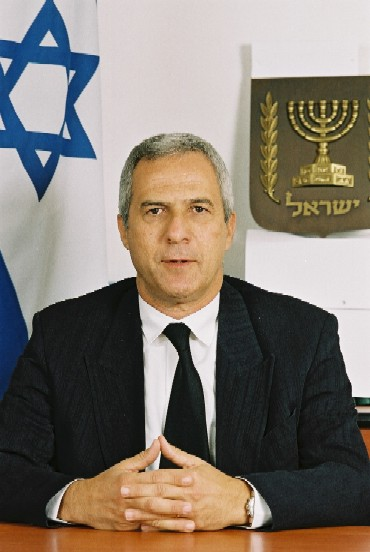
- Born: 24 June 1947 (age 79); Pardes Hanna, Mandatory Palestine
- Education: Hebrew University; JAG School, University of Virginia
- Military career
- Allegiance: Israel
- Unit: Military Advocate General (1986–1991)
- Conflicts: Six-Day War; First Intifada

Amnon Straschnov (Hebrew: אמנון סטרשנוב; born July 24, 1947) is a retired Israeli judge.

== Biography ==
Amnon Staschnov was born in Pardes Hanna. After graduating from Pardes Hanna Agricultural High School in 1964, he went on studied law in the Hebrew University as part of the Atuda program. He completed a commander's course in the Israel Defense Forces and participated in combat in the Jerusalem area during the Six-Day War. After receiving a BA in law in 1968, he joined the military prosecution. During his legal internship he also acted as a football referee, including refereeing matches in the Liga Leumit, then the top division, and the State Cup. Staschnov attended The JAG School at the University of Virginia as an Israeli military student. He lives in Ra'anana with his wife Miriam and has 4 sons.

== Judicial career ==
Straschnov served as a military lawyer, and was a prosecutor for the IDF Northern Command. He served as Chief Military Prosecutor and graduated from Graduate Officer Course of the U.S. Army Judge Advocate General's School. He was president of the Military Courts in the West Bank from 1982 to 1984, and served as Military Advocate General of the IDF from 1986 to 1991, during the First Intifada.

In 1991 he was selected by the Judicial Committee to serve as a judge on the Tel Aviv District Court, a position from which he retired in 2002.

He is the author of Justice Under Fire (1994, Hebrew).

Straschnov was critical of the Israeli police's use of leaks in the financial scandal involving Israeli Prime Minister Ehud Olmert.

He was President of the Israeli Institute of Commercial arbitration and is affiliated with the Jerusalem Center for Public Affairs.
