= Mordechai Schwarcz =

British Palestine police officer and murderer

- Schwarcz in 1937
- Born: December 16, 1914; Komárno, Austria-Hungary
- Died: August 16, 1938 (aged 23); Acre Prison, Acre, Mandatory Palestine
- Cause of death: Execution by hanging
- Organization(s): Haganah; Palestine Police Force
- Status: Executed
- Motive: Anti-Palestinian sentiment
- Conviction: Murder
- Penalty: Death

Details
- Victims: Mustafa Khoury
- Date: September 1, 1937
- Country: Mandatory Palestine

Mordechai Schwarcz (Hebrew: מרדכי שוורץ; December 16, 1914 – August 16, 1938), usually spelt Schwartz, was a Czechoslovakia-born Jewish police officer in Mandatory Palestine, who was tried, convicted, and executed for the murder of a fellow police officer who was an Arab. Schwarcz was the only Jew to be executed by British Mandate authorities for the murder of a Palestinian.

== Biography ==
Schwarcz was born in Komárno, then in the Austro-Hungarian Empire, to a Jewish family, one of 14 children. Over the objections of his parents he made aliyah in 1933. He joined the Palestine Police Force, and like most Jewish police officers, also joined the Haganah.

Schwarcz was one of the policemen stationed at the High Commissioner's summer camp in Atlit to guard against bandits during the 1936–1939 Arab revolt in Palestine. On the night of September 1, 1937, he shot dead Mustafa Khoury, an Arab policeman with whom he shared a tent. Khoury was sleeping when he was killed. Schwarz was arrested the following day. It has been claimed that Khoury was a "fanatical nationalist" who mocked Schwarcz and expressed satisfaction over Jews being killed during the rebellion. One of Schwarcz's friends testified that the Khoury had entered the tent drunk, boasting about having raped and murdered Jews and that "Schwarcz's turn would come." Shortly before committing the murder, two of Schwarcz's friends had been killed in the rebellion.

At his trial in Haifa, Schwarz, who was defended by Aharon Hoter-Yishai, claimed that he had heard gunfire and rushed outside the tent, only to find Khoury dead upon returning. The court rejected this defence. In January 1938, Chief Justice Harry Trusted found Schwarcz guilty of murder and sentenced him to death by hanging. The Supreme Court of Mandatory Palestine upheld the conviction and sentence, the Privy Council in London refused to intervene in the case, and High Commissioner Harold MacMichael confirmed the sentence. One justice on the Supreme Court of Mandatory Palestine dissented in the decision to uphold Schwarcz's conviction, Gad Frumkin, who was later a nominee for the Supreme Court of Israel.

Appeals for clemency came from Justice Trusted, as well as American and international Jewish organizations. A clemency petition with 70,000 signatures was submitted to the Mandate government by Mizrach leader Meir Bar-Ilan.

Moshe Sharett, the director of the Jewish Agency's Political Department, wrote a letter to MacMichael, requesting a pardon, but he refused to commute the sentence. While awaiting execution, Schwarcz confessed to the murder. However, he claimed it was not done "maliciously and intentionally," saying Khoury had provoked him.

"The truth is that I did the deed, but I'm not to blame for his death, because he was to blame. I've always been opposed to shedding the blood of an innocent man. But he brought me to the point where I did what I did without realizing it. He told me, 'Just as four Jews were killed today in Hadera, we'll kill you all. We'll annihilate all the Jews, not one of you will be left here.' And thus he provoked, threatened and mocked me for two nights. Out of both sorrow and fear, I didn't sleep the night before the deed. I was in a daze the whole day afterward. On the second night he again began to provoke me."

Schwartz said he fled to the latrines, planning "to stay there all night," but that he was "assailed by fear and panic."

"They were chasing me and shooting at me. And when I returned to the tent confused, he once again enraged and mocked me, and I completely lost my sanity and did what I did."

Schwarcz was hanged in Acre Prison on August 16, 1938, after receiving last rites from Rabbi Yehoshua Kaniel of Haifa. As he walked to the gallows, he cried out, "Shema Yisrael." On the day before his execution he wrote the following to the newspaper Davar.

I should like you to publish these lines after my death. My final requests of the Jewish public in this country and abroad is not to take any action likely to lead to violence and disturbance in connection with my execution.

In order to prevent this opportunity from being exploited by certain persons for provocative purposes which may lead to innocent bloodshed, I wish to say that I have no connection with that movement, and my conceptions are opposed to terrorism and bloodshed.

My own case I regard as a private mistake in a moment of temporary aberration. I profoundly regret whatever I have done and willingly accept my fate.

My regards to all my friends in Ramat Gan and Sh'chunath Borochow. I hope they will forgive me for having proved false to my education and our movement.

Do not try to emulate me. Goodbye all.

== Aftermath ==
The Haganah disowned Schwarcz over his actions, and refused to acknowledge him as a casualty from its ranks. Throughout the following decades, only a handful of journalists and researchers wrote about him. In contrast to the other Olei Hagardom, he was largely forgotten. However, when Menachem Begin became Prime Minister of Israel, he added Schwarcz to the official list of Olei Hagardom. In 1987, after repeated appeals from Schwarcz's fiancée, the Haganah veterans' organization finally agreed to have his picture displayed in the museum exhibit for Olei Hagardom, with a note that he was from the Haganah.

Several journalists have investigated his case and the political struggle that took place over his acceptance as a national martyr. On March 8, 2010, an article by journalist Yossi Melman in Haaretz entitled "The Battle Over the Memorialization of the Forgotten Hanged Man" reported on the attempt by veterans of the Lehi and Irgun groups to have him acknowledged as someone who had acted out of a nationalist motive and had contributed to the foundation of the State of Israel and the opposition by veterans of the Haganah.
