= Aharon Hoter-Yishai =

Israeli attorney

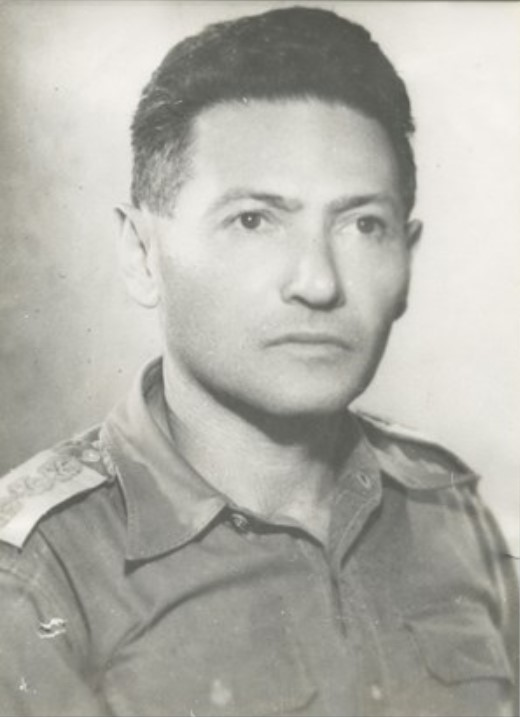
Aharon Hoter-Yishai

Aharon Hoter-Yishai (Hebrew: אהרן חטר-ישי; January 1, 1905 – May 20, 2003) was an Israeli military officer and lawyer.

== Early life and career ==
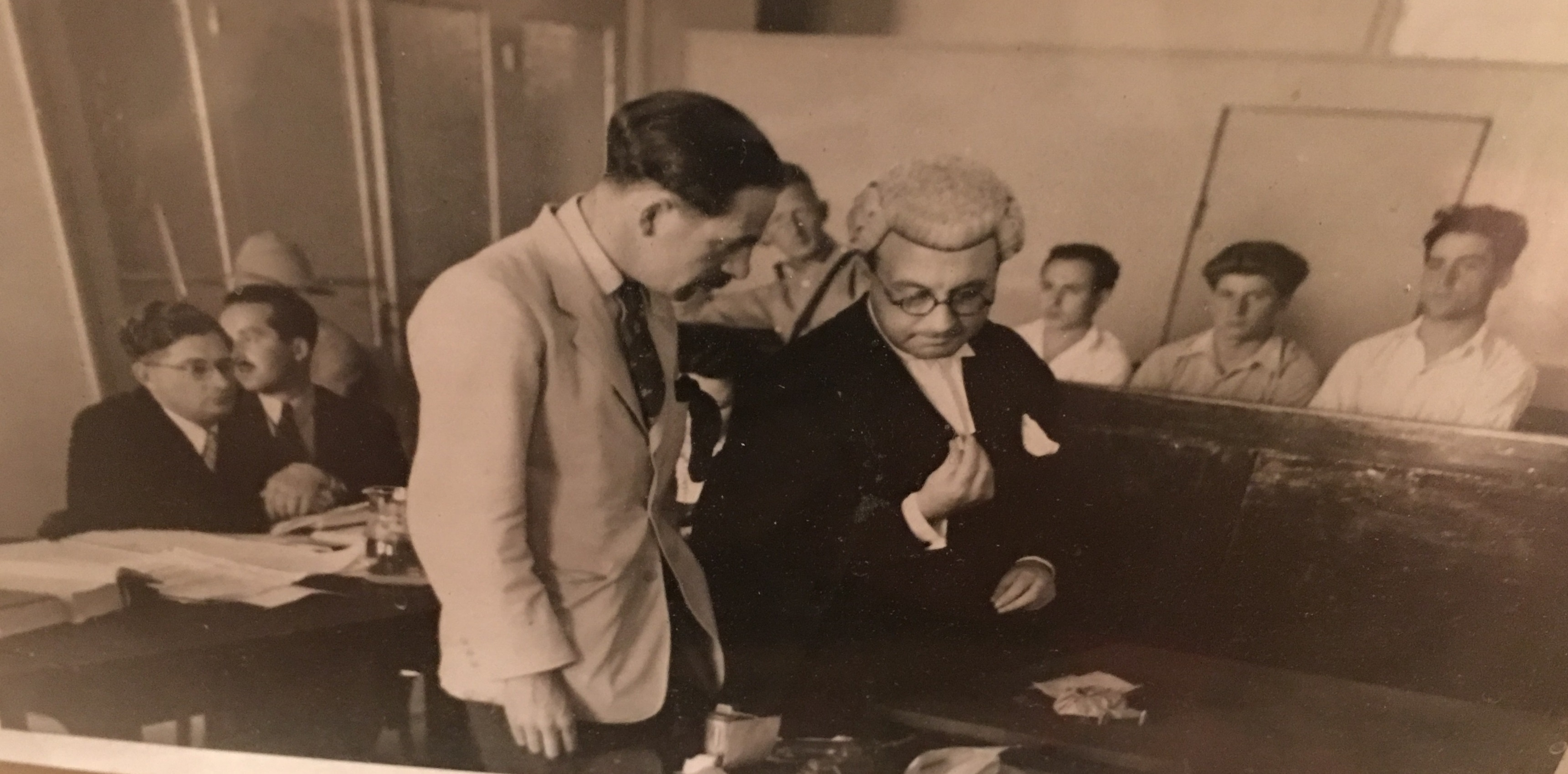
Hoter-Yishai with Philip Joseph (in wig) during the trial of Shlomo Ben-Yosef

Hoter-Yishai was born as Aharon Khotorsky in the Russian Empire in 1905, and was one of five children. He moved to Ottoman Palestine at age 8 with his twin sister and older brother. His parents and two other sisters later joined them. During World War I the family lived in Hadera, where his parents purchased a farm. After the war he studied at the Herzliya Hebrew Gymnasium in Tel Aviv.

In 1926, he began studying law at the Mandatory Law School in Jerusalem. He also joined the Haganah and participated in its first officer's course in 1927. After being certified as a lawyer, he moved to Haifa. He proceeded to practice law and was involved in many cases involving illegal Jewish immigration, illegal weapons possession, illegal agricultural activities, and violence. He represented Shlomo Ben-Yosef and Mordechai Schwarcz at their trials.

He married Rachel Rabinovitz in 1930. They had three children: On, Dror, and Smadar.

== Military career ==
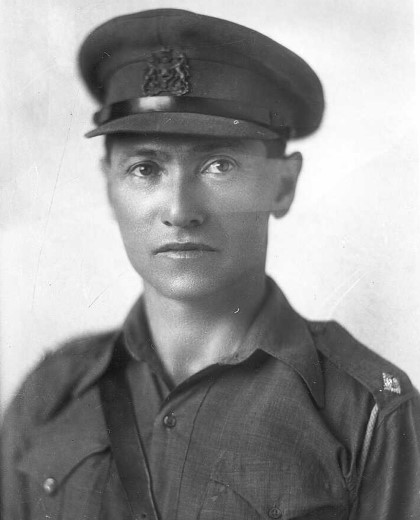
Hoter-Yishai as an officer in the British Army

After the outbreak of World War II, Hoter-Yishai enlisted in the British Army in 1941 and initially served in the Buffs. He became an officer and commanded units serving in guard duties in Palestine and North Africa. He eventually reached the rank of Captain. He organized his battalion's cultural activities as well as cultural and educational work among Libyan Jews while stationed in Benghazi. He became an officer in the Jewish Brigade following its establishment. During the brigade's participation in the final stages of the Italian campaign, he served as commander of the headquarters company of the brigade's 2nd battalion as well as spokesperson for the entire brigade.

After the German surrender, Hoter-Yishai was tasked with coordinating the activities of the brigade involving assisting Jewish refugees in immigrating to Palestine by Yehuda Arazi of the Mossad LeAliyah Bet, the Haganah agency involved in facilitating illegal Jewish immigration. He traveled throughout Europe to locate Holocaust survivors in order to assist them in immigrating to Palestine. He visited several of the Nazi camps and places where Jewish survivors were including Freimann Flak-Kaserne and the St. Ottilien Archabbey. In June 1945 he arrived at Theresienstadt. He also visited the camps at Dachau, Bergen-Belsen, and Mauthausen. He found many refugees in a dire situation and discovered that some of those who had returned to their home countries had not survived due to the hostility of locals. He confronted British and American officers in demanding improvements in the refugees' living conditions and a halt in repatriations to their original countries. He pressured David Ben-Gurion to visit the refugees before returning to Palestine from a conference in London in 1945 and organized a gathering of Jewish soldiers from numerous Allied armies in Paris. He also helped organize professional courses for soldiers to help them reintegrate into civilian life and gather evidence regarding looted Jewish property for the Nuremberg trials.

On his return to Palestine in January 1946, Hoter-Yishai became involved in efforts to help discharged soldiers reintegrate into civilian life. He also resumed his legal career, defending two officers in the British Army accused of making political speeches, participants in the Birya affair, and the owners of a ship carrying illegal Jewish immigrants. He also helped raise money for Jewish refugees in displaced persons camps.

During the 1947–1948 civil war in Mandatory Palestine and 1948 Arab-Israeli War, Hoter-Yishai served as an officer in the Haganah and Israel Defense Forces. He became an administrative officer in the 7th Armored Brigade after its founding and organized the brigade's judicial system based on the British Army model, which served as a template for other IDF units. In December 1948, he was transferred to the Military Advocate General. He became the IDF's first Chief Military Advocate General.

Hoter-Yishai was at the forefront of absolving Meir Tobianski posthumously. Tobianski had been put on trial in June 1948 and executed for being a traitor. Hoter-Yishai presided over a retrial at which he was found not guilty.

After shaping and institutionalizing the Military Advocate General's Office, Hoter-Yishai was discharged from the IDF with the rank of Colonel.

== Later life ==
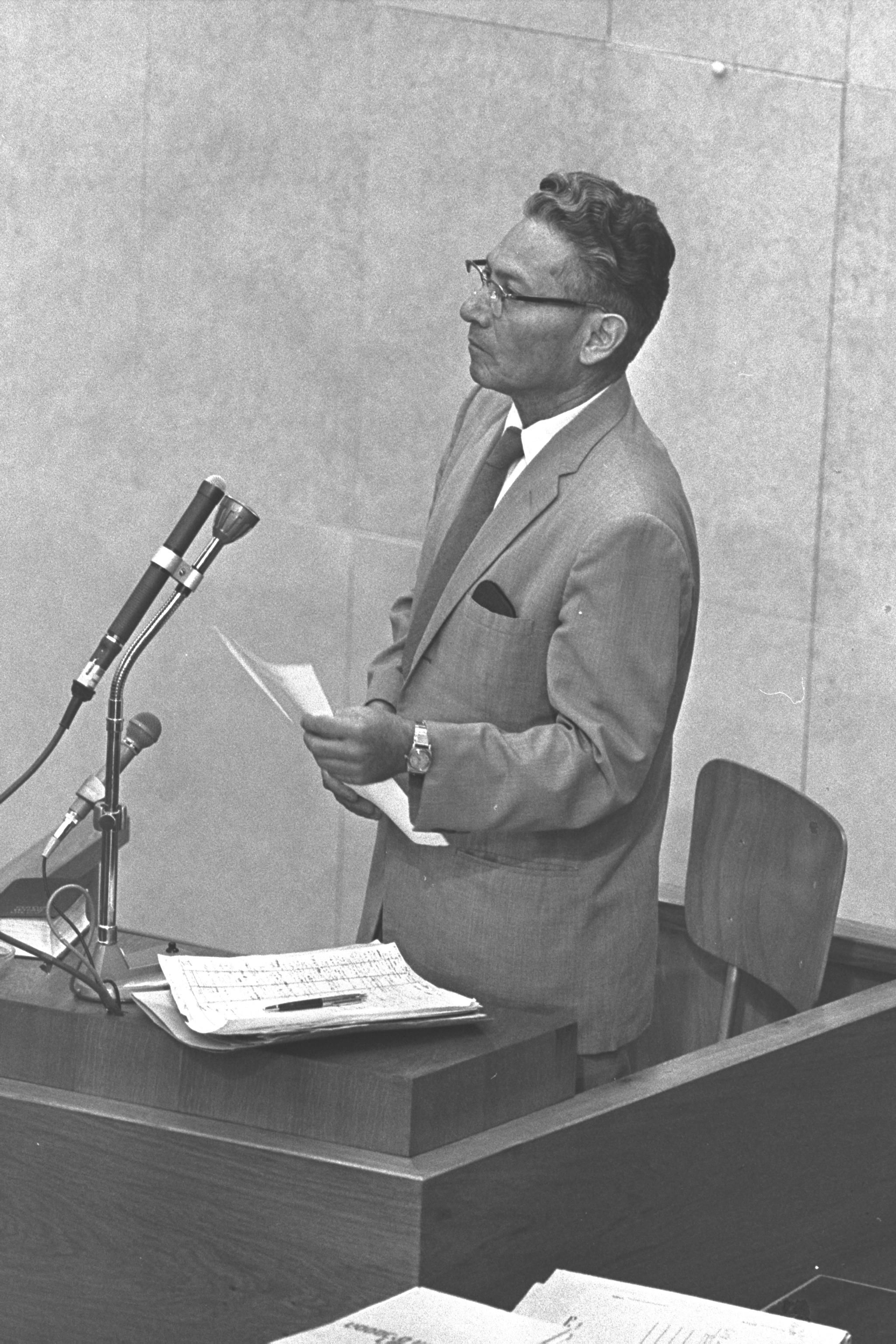
Hoter-Yishai at the Eichmann trial in 1961

After leaving the IDF, Hoter-Yishai subsequently resumed practicing law. He also engaged in other public activities, including compiling a report on the Lavon Affair and serving as Chairman of the Sports Association. He was also a member of the investigative committee on the Kafr Qasim massacre and the Yad Vashem committee.

In 1961 Hoter-Yishai was called as witness in the trial of Adolf Eichmann. He testified regarding what he found at the concentration camps he encountered:

Attorney General: "Mr. Hoter-Yishai, in 1945, at the end of the Second World War, you were in Europe as an officer in the second battalion of the Jewish Brigade – is that correct?"

Witness Hoter-Yishai: "Correct...I believe that if I were to try to confine myself to a few sentences, I could say: We found a collection of living people who, psychologically, were not very different from those corpses we found lying there without limbs and even heads. From the physical point of view, everything was done, to a certain extent, especially during the first stages, in order to put them back on their feet, as far as that was possible. If my memory serves me correctly, there were, at the time, in Bergen-Belsen, 52,000 refugees, of whom 27,000 died in the course of receiving medical treatment."

Hoter-Yishai released a book in 1958 and another one in 1991. He suffered a stroke in 1992 that left him partially paralyzed and unable to speak, and devoted himself to writing. He released a further book and worked on another one which remained unpublished. He died in 2003 at the age of 98.
