= Sharon Afek =

Israeli general (born 1970)

Sharon Afek שָׁרוֹן אֲפֵק
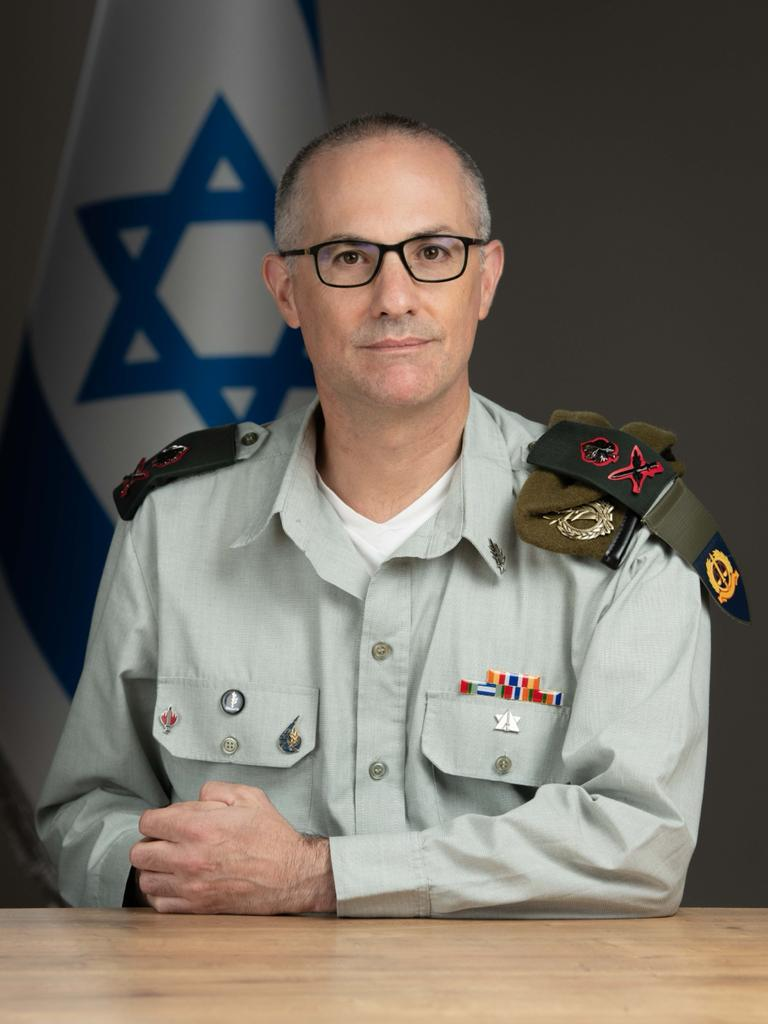
- Born: 10 August 1970 (age 56)
- Military career
- Allegiance: Israel
- Rank: Aluf (General officer)
- Unit: Military Advocate General
- Conflicts: First Intifada; Second Intifada; Second Lebanon War; Operation Protective Edge

Sharon Afek (Hebrew: שָׁרוֹן אֲפֵק; born August 10, 1970) is an Israeli military officer, who has served as the Deputy Attorney General (Director of Legal Counsel and Legislative Affairs) in Israel's Ministry of Justice. Previously, Afek was the chief military advocate general of the Israel Defense Forces (IDF) in 2015–2021.

== Military career ==
After receiving his law degree from Tel Aviv University School of Law, Afek joined the Military Advocate General Corps, beginning his career in the International Law Department of the unit. He then fulfilled various senior positions in the Military Advocate General Corps, including the deputy head of the International Law Department, the Air Force District Attorney, the legal advisor for Judea and Samaria Area and the deputy military advocate general.

Afterwards, he served as the commander of the interservice “Afek” course of the IDF Staff and Command College.

On October 22, 2015, Afek was promoted to the rank of Aluf (general officer) and appointed chief military advocate general. On July 12, 2018, Afek was promoted to the rank of major general from IDF chief of staff Gadi Eisenkot.

As Military Advocate General, Afek functioned as both a legal adviser to the military an as a military attorney general, responsible for law enforcement and military prosecution.

During his tenure in office, Afek dealt with a number of high-profile cases, most notably the fallout from a 2016 incident in which soldier Elor Azaria shot to death a subdued Palestinian attacker in Hebron. The soldier was subsequently convicted of manslaughter. In an interview with the Israeli Bar Association, Afek referred to the case as a legal and moral landmark in the history of military law.

As a Military Advocate General Afek led a series of reforms in the IDF's law enforcement policies, including amendments to the drug enforcement regime, allowing soldiers using cannabis for the first time on civilian circumstances to emerge the legal proceedings with an unscathed record and no jail time, by receiving treatment, being put on probation and undergoing drug tests.

Afek graduated cum laude with an LLB degree from Tel Aviv University and completed his master's degree in law, summa cum laude, at Tel Aviv University. Afek also holds a master's degree, cum laude, in national security studies from Haifa University (as a joint program with the IDF's National Security College). Additionally, he attended the Senior Executives in State and Local Government program at Harvard University.

On September 1, 2021, Afek was succeeded as Chief Military Advocate General by Major General Yifat Tomer Yerushalmi.

== Deputy Attorney General ==
After retiring from the IDF, Affek was named in the candidates list for the Supreme Court of Israel.

In September 2022, the Israeli Minister of Justice, Gideon Sa'ar announced that he will recommend Afek for the role of Deputy Attorney General.

Afek's nomination was unanimously approved by a selection panel headed by the Attorney General of Israel, Gali Baharav-Miara.

== Private life ==
In an interview to Israel Bar association official magazine, Sharon Afek revealed he is gay, making him the first member of high command and the most senior Israeli military officer to come out. The First Lady of Israel, Michal Herzog, is his paternal cousin.

== See also ==
- Sexual orientation and gender identity in the Israeli military
