= Daniel Reisner =

Israeli attorney (1963–2026)

- דניאל רייזנר
- Born: 1963; Israel
- Died: 14 July 2026 (aged 62–63)
- Education: Tel Aviv University (L.L.B; 1985)
- Occupation: Attorney
- Employer: Herzog, Fox & Neeman
- Known for: Head of the Israel Defense Forces International Law Department (1995–2004)
- Title: Colonel (Res.) Adv.
- Successor: Col. Pnina Sharvit-Baruch

Colonel (Res.) Adv. Daniel Reisner (Hebrew: דניאל רייזנר; born in Israel in 1963, died in 2026) was the former Head of the International Law Branch of the Israel Defense Forces (IDF) Legal Division, and a partner with Herzog, Fox & Neeman.
