= Menachem Finkelstein =

Military Advocate General of Israel

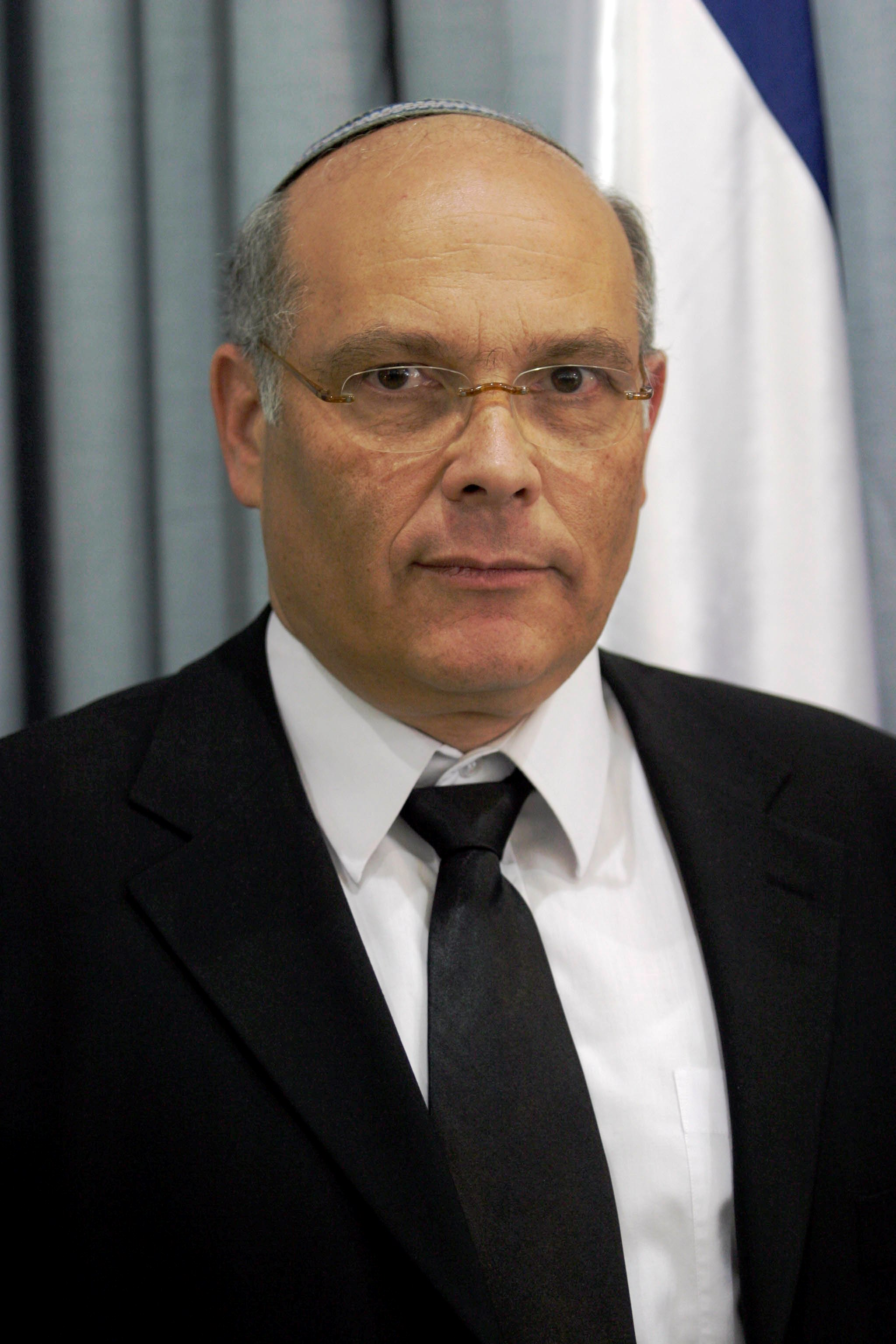
Menachem Finkelstein

Menachem Finkelstein (Hebrew: מנחם פינקלשטיין) was Israel's Military Advocate General from 2000 to 2004, during the height of the Second Intifada.

Finkelstein was born in 1951 and received an Orthodox Jewish upbringing. He passed the Israeli bar exam in 1976. He served in the Judge Advocate General's office in the IDF from 1973 to 2004, becoming a Major-General. He presided over the judgment that targeted killings were a legal part of the war on terror. In 2004 Hamas's Sheikh Yassin was killed under the policy. In July 2003 Finkelstein decided not to open a criminal investigation into the death of International Solidarity Movement activist Rachel Corrie, but he did open an investigation into the death of Tom Hurndall in October 2003. In 2004 he testified before the Knesset's Law and Constitution committee and noted that "In all the fatality cases we have investigated, there has never been a single incident of deliberate shooting [of civilians by the IDF]." He retired from the army in 2004 and became a district judge.

== Works ==
English :

Conversion: halakhah and practice (translated from the Hebrew by Edward Levin). Ramat-Gan: Bar-Ilan University Press, 2006. This book was praised by Aaron Kirschenbaum and by Daniel Sperber.

"Legal Perspective in the Fight Against Terror – The Israeli Experience." IDF Law Review. 1 (2003): 341–349.

"The Dilemma of The Military Judge Advocate – General" (2000). In Cohen, Stuart A. (ed.). Democratic Societies and Their Armed Forces: Israel in Comparative Context. Routledge. pp. 175-183.

"The Israeli Military Legal System - overview of the current situation and a glimpse into the future." With Yifat Tomer. Air Force Law Review. 52 (2002): 137-167.

"War and Morality: Image and Reality", JUSTICE. 30 (Winter 2002): 11-15.

"Conversion in the Age of Immigration", JUSTICE. 19 (Winter 1998): 47-49.
