= Military Courts Unit =

- יחידת בתי הדין הצבאיים
- Active: 1948–present
- Country: Israel
- Branch: Israel Defense Forces
- Type: Military judicial authority
- Role: Administration of military justice
- Part of: Military Advocate General's Corps
- Garrison/HQ: Tel Aviv
- Nickname: Unit 205

Commanders
- Current commander: Maj. Gen. Orly Markman

Insignia
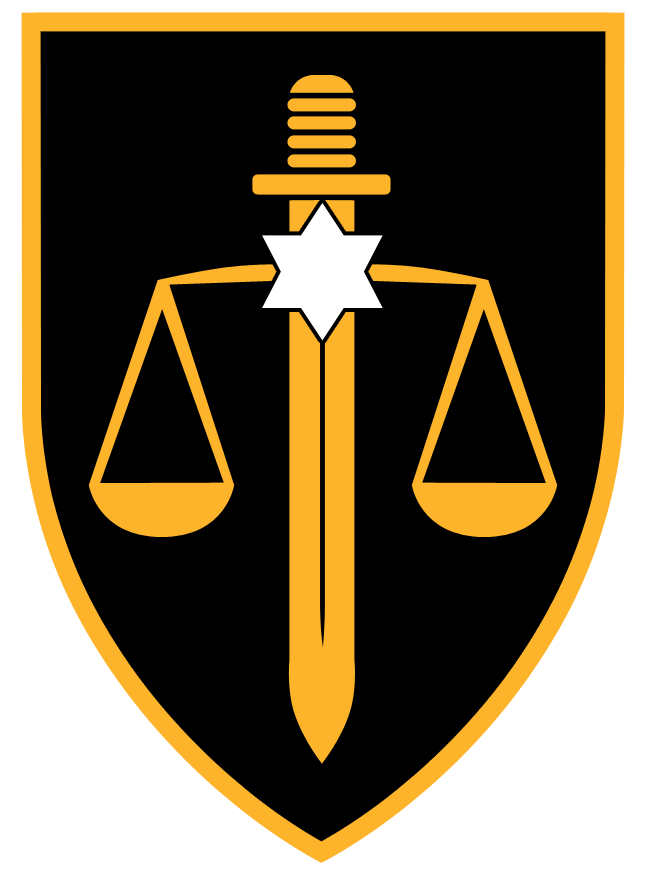
- Emblem

The Military Courts Unit (Hebrew: יחידת בתי הדין הצבאיים), also known as the 205th Unit, is the judicial authority of the Israel Defense Forces (IDF). It operates the system of military courts established under the Military Justice Law of 1955, and is responsible for adjudicating cases involving soldiers, officers, career service members, and in certain cases civilians subject to military jurisdiction.

== History ==
The first IDF military trial took place in June 1948, shortly after the establishment of the State of Israel. The Military Courts Unit was formally organized later, and its jurisdiction and procedures were codified in the Military Justice Law of 1955.

== Structure ==
The unit is headed by an officer with the rank of Aluf (Major General), who also serves as the President of the Military Court of Appeals. The current president is Maj. Gen. Orly Markman.

The system includes:

- District Military Courts
  - Central District – covering the Central Command, Home Front Command and Israeli Air Force.
  - Southern District – covering the Southern Command and the Israeli Ground Forces.
  - Northern District – covering the Northern Command and the Israeli Navy.
- Specialized Courts
  - Special Military Court – cases involving senior officers.
  - Naval Military Court – cases involving naval personnel.
  - Field Military Court (Hebrew: בית דין שדה) – convened during wartime for urgent proceedings.
- Military Court of Appeals – the highest court in the system. Its rulings are subject to review by the Supreme Court of Israel.

== Role and jurisdiction ==
The Military Courts Unit enforces discipline and law within the IDF, hearing cases ranging from disciplinary violations to serious crimes. Its decisions are legally binding, and the courts are regarded as independent under Israeli law.

== See also ==
- Military Advocate General
- Israel Defense Forces
- Supreme Court of Israel
