= Atuda =

Program of the Israeli Defense Forces

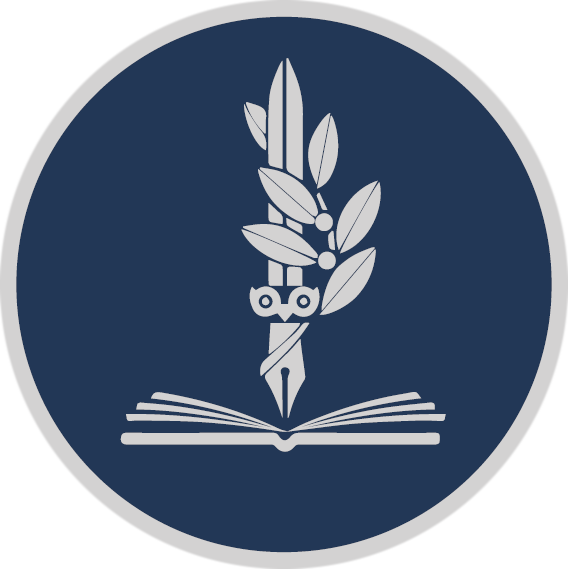
The new Atuda badge, since 2019

Atuda, or Academic Atuda (Hebrew: עתודה אקדמית, literally: Academic Reserve), is a program of the Israel Defense Forces which enables high school graduates to defer the draft and attend university prior to their military service. After they complete their studies, they join the army and serve in a position that fits the professional knowledge they gained during their studies. The program is similar to other programs worldwide such as the American Army Reserve Officers' Training Corps.

== Programs ==
Israelis are drafted at 18 years old, generally after graduation from high school. In many fields, the army needs soldiers with a much broader education and academic background, such as engineers, physicians, economists, nurses, and lawyers. The Atuda program was created for this purpose.

An Israeli soldier who participates in the Atuda program is called an Atudai (Hebrew: עתודאי), or an Atudait (Hebrew: עתודאית) for a female academic soldier. After finishing his or her studies, the Atudai serves two years and eight months of obligatory service in the army, like any other male soldier, female soldiers also sign to extend their service to the same length as their male counterparts, and then serve an additional two or three years of regular service, depending on the degree they study. The difference between obligatory service and regular service is, among other things, reflected in the salary they earn. Usually, the Atudai attends officer training after completing their studies, but before starting obligatory service.

In addition to the Academic Atuda program, the IDF operates the Technologic Atuda (Hebrew: עתודה טכנולוגית) program, which trains future soldiers in technology. This program is shorter (one or two years instead of three or four), and usually takes place in technological colleges instead of universities. Upon completion, the soldiers are granted a technician or a practical engineer diploma.

The tuition payments are partially paid by the army. If the enrollees wish to opt out of the program, e.g. if they changed their mind, they will have to settle the prior tuition payments with the army, which, as a consequence, turn into debt.

== See also ==
- Reserve Officers' Training Corps
- Education in Israel
