= Zvika Hadar =

Israeli actor, comedian and television host

- צביקה הדר
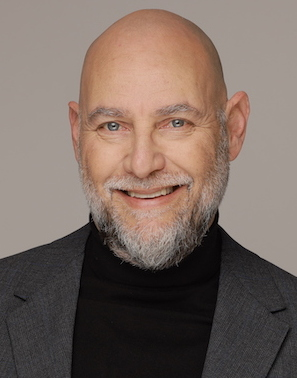
- Hadar in 2022
- Born: Zvi Fruchter; 7 April 1966 (age 60); Beersheba, Israel
- Occupations: Reality and game show host, television and actor
- Notable work: Shemesh, Ha-Comedy Store

Zvika Hadar (Hebrew: צביקה הדר, Hebrew pronunciation: [ˈt͡svika haˈdaʁ]; born 7 April 1966) is an Israeli actor, comedian and television host.

== Biography ==
Zvi (Zvika) Fruchter (later Hadar) was born in Beersheba, Israel, to Romanian Jewish family. As a child, he studied piano. Early in his career, he composed numbers for musicals.

Hadar first appeared on television as Jojo Khalastra on the satiric show Ha-Comedy Store. He was the host of Kokhav Nolad, the Israeli version of Idol for ten seasons. He has also acted in a number of Israeli movies including starring in Pick a Card.

In September 2012, Hadar suffered cardiac arrest upon arriving at clinic in Tel Aviv for a checkup. The cardiologist performed CPR and revived him. He was transferred taken to Ichilov Hospital and was released after cardiac catheterization.

He is a devoted supporter of Hapoel Be'er Sheva.

== Awards and recognition ==
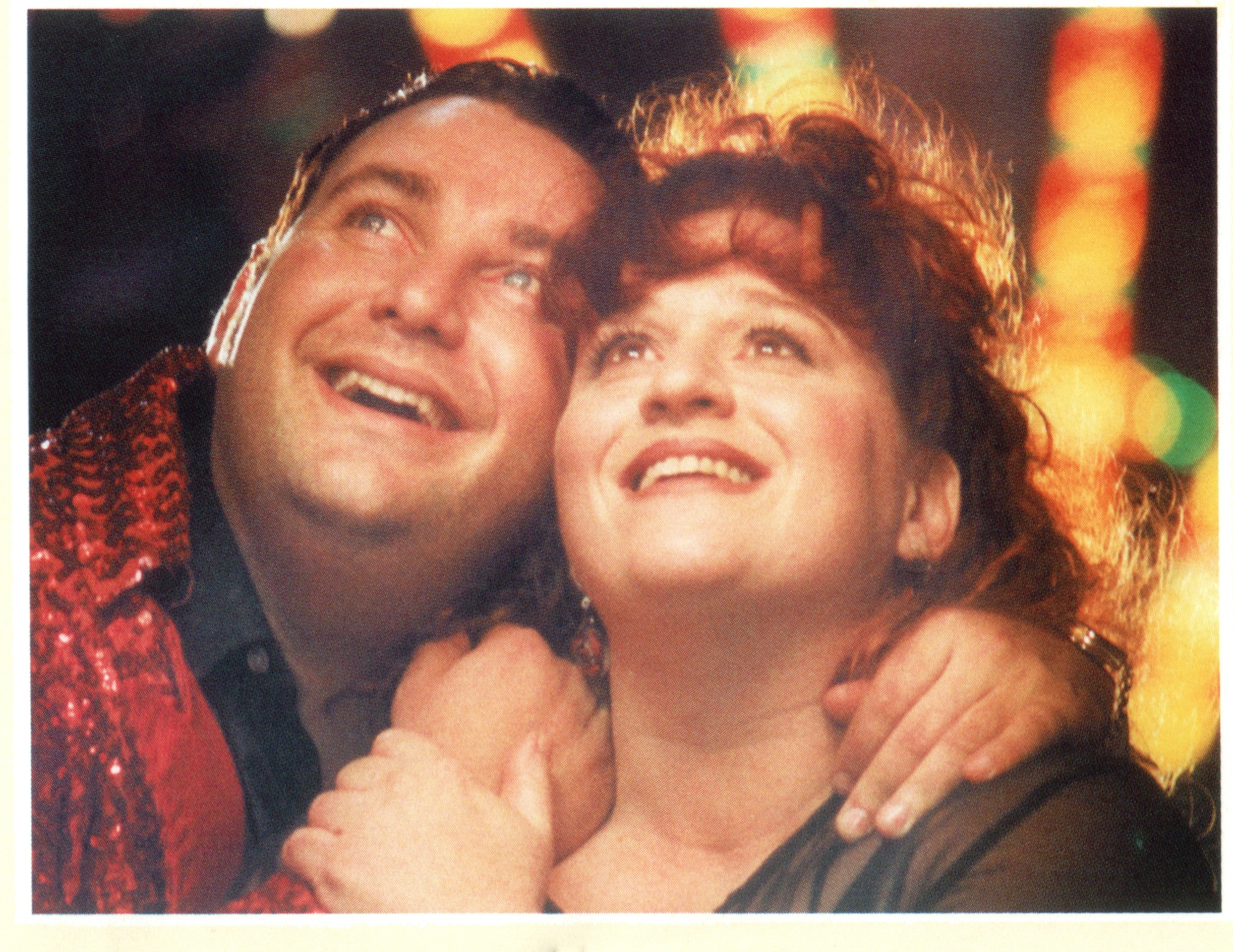
Zvika Hadar in Afula Express

In 1999, he was nominated for Best Actor award at the Awards of the Israeli Film Academy for his role in Afula Express.

== Filmography ==
- 1997–2004: Shemesh as Nachum Shemesh
- 1999: Kochavim Baribu'a (TV series)
- 1997: Afula Express as David
- 2001: Shachar (TV series)
- 2010: Blue Natalie (TV series) as Gadi Amit
- 2013: Hunting Elephants as Daniel
- 2017: Zvika and Eyal do school (TV series) with Eyal Doron
