= Chana Orloff =

Ukrainian sculptor (1888–1968)

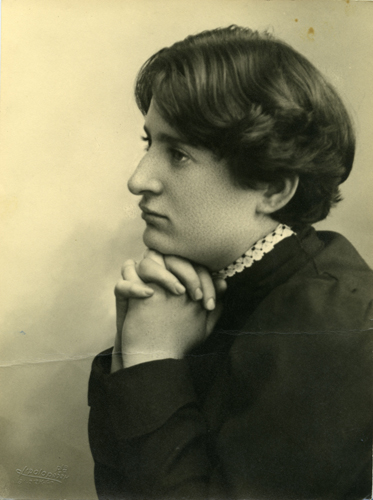
Chana Orloff, Gabriel Talphir Archive, The Information Center for Israeli Art, Israel Museum, Jerusalem

Chana Orloff (Hebrew: חנה אורלוף, Russian: Анна Рафаиловна Орлова; 25 June 1888 – 16 December 1968) was a Ukrainian-born French and Israeli Art deco and figurative art sculptor.

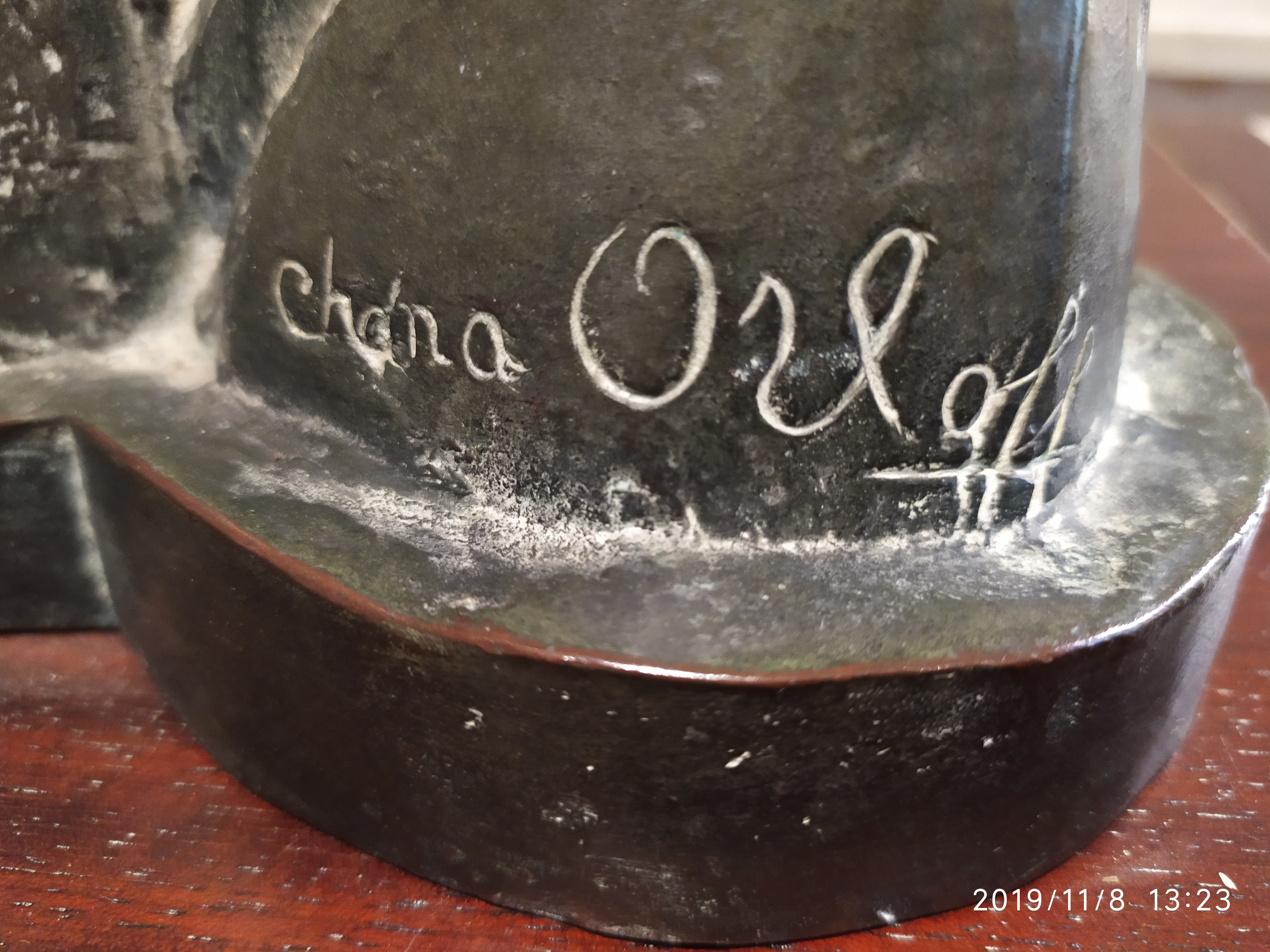
Signature of Orloff on the sculpture of Reuven Rubin, 1926, bronze

== Biography ==
Chana Orloff, 1915, Amazone, bronze, 73.5 cm

Chana Orloff was born on June 25, 1888, the eighth of nine children in Aleksandrovsk. Her elder brothers were born in the Jewish agricultural colony Trudolyubovka (Aleksandrovsk uyezd) in southeastern Ukraine (then Russian Empire)., on the coast of the Sea of Azov, part of the Black Sea. Her father and his family stemmed from the Jewish colony of Veselaya (Aleksandrovsk uyezd) As a teenager she took classes in sewing and dressmaking in Mariupol to ensure she could earn a living and avoid an arranged marriage.

In order to escape the pogroms in this period in Ukraine, Orloff immigrated with her family to Ottoman Palestine in 1905 and settled in Petah Tikva (Gateway of Hope), the first Jewish agricultural settlement in Palestine. She worked as a seamstress designing and sewing European-style clothing for local Jewish settlers. Eventually she moved away from her family and rented a room of her own in the Neve Tzedek neighborhood of Jaffa, to be closer to her clients. Zvi Nishri (Orloff), the pioneer in physical education in Israel, was her brother. Orloff took class at the Gymnasia Herzliya, where Nishri was a teacher, and joined the Hapoel Hatzair workers movement and Hapoel Rishon LeZion sports club. After five years in Palestine, she was offered a teaching position in sewing and dressmaking at Hovevei Zion School for Girls in Jaffa. Orloff went to Paris to study fashion with the expectation she would return to Palestine to begin her teaching position. In Paris she took classes in drawing and fashion design and worked at the haute couture house of Paquin. In 1911 she matriculated at the École nationale supérieure des arts décoratifs in hopes of pursuing a career in fine art. She enrolled simultaneously in informal classes at the Académie Russe in Montparnasse. In 1916, she married Ary Justman, a Warsaw-born Jewish writer and poet. The couple had a son in 1918, but Justman died of influenza in the epidemic of 1919. When the Nazis invaded Paris, Orloff fled to Switzerland with her son and the Jewish painter Georges Kars. In February 1945, Kars committed suicide in Geneva, after which Orloff returned to Paris, to find that her house had been ransacked and the sculptures in her studio destroyed.

== Art career ==
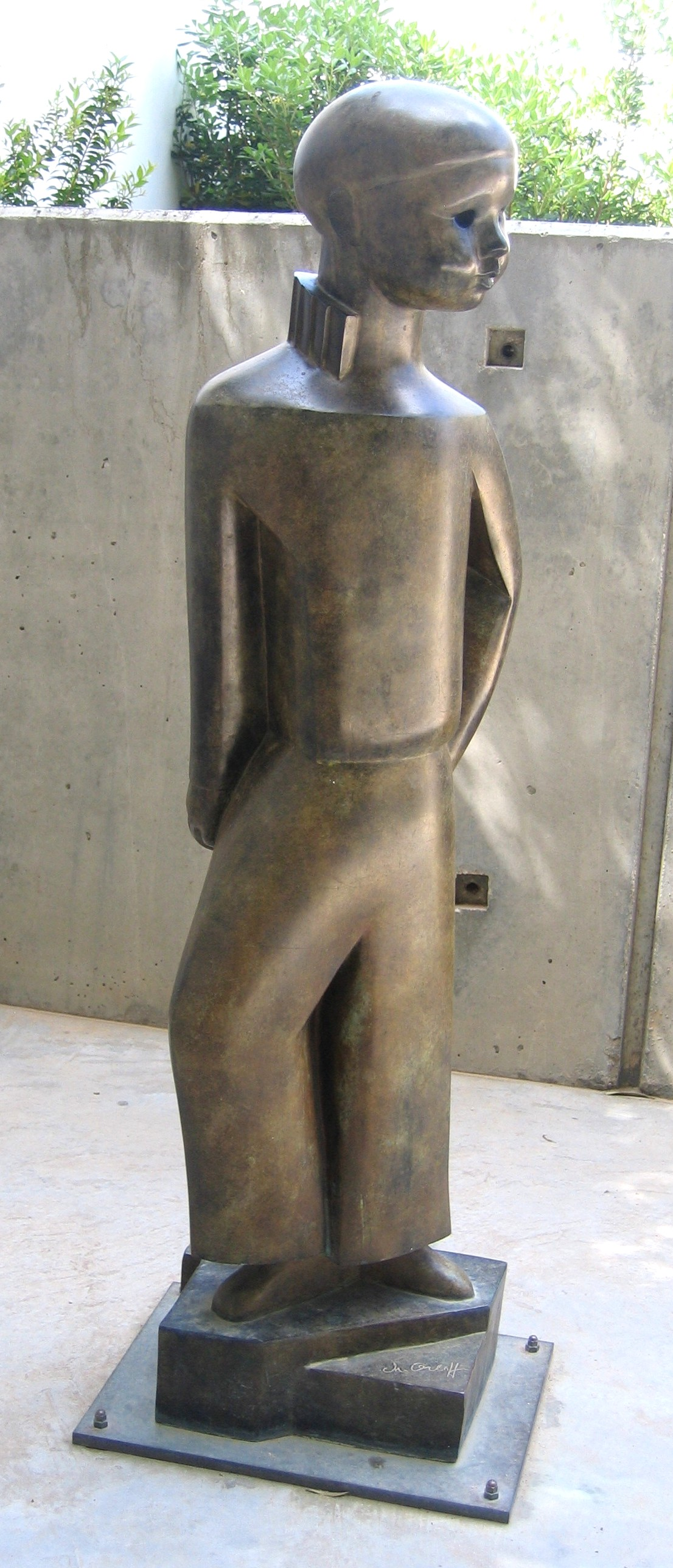
My Son, 1924, Tel Aviv Museum of Art

In Paris, Orloff became friendly with other young Jewish artists, among them Marc Chagall, Jacques Lipchitz, Amedeo Modigliani, Jules Pascin, Chaïm Soutine, and Ossip Zadkine. In 1913, she exhibited in the Salon d'Automne. After the establishment of the State of Israel, Orloff began spending an increasing amount of time there. The Tel Aviv Museum of Art held an exhibition of 37 of her sculptures in 1949. She remained in Israel for about a year in order to complete a sculpture of David Ben-Gurion, The Hero Monument to the defenders of Ein Gev and The Motherhood Monument in memory of Chana Tuchman Alderstein who died during the 1947–1949 Palestine war. After her return to Paris in 1950, Orloff received support and friendship from the Ukrainian-born artist Norman Carton to further grow her Parisian career using photography. She became a mentor to him. In addition to monuments, Orloff sculpted portraits of Israeli Prime Minister David Ben-Gurion and future Prime Minister Levi Eshkol; the architects Pierre Chareau, and Auguste Perret; painters Henri Matisse, Amedeo Modigliani, Pablo Picasso, and Per Krohg; and the poets Hayyim Nahman Bialik, and Pierre Mac Orlan. .

Orloff died in Israel on 16 December 1968.

== See also ==
- Visual arts in Israel
- Women of Israel
