= Jojo Khalastra =

Jojo Khalastra ז'וז'ו חלסטרה
- Ha-Comedy Store character
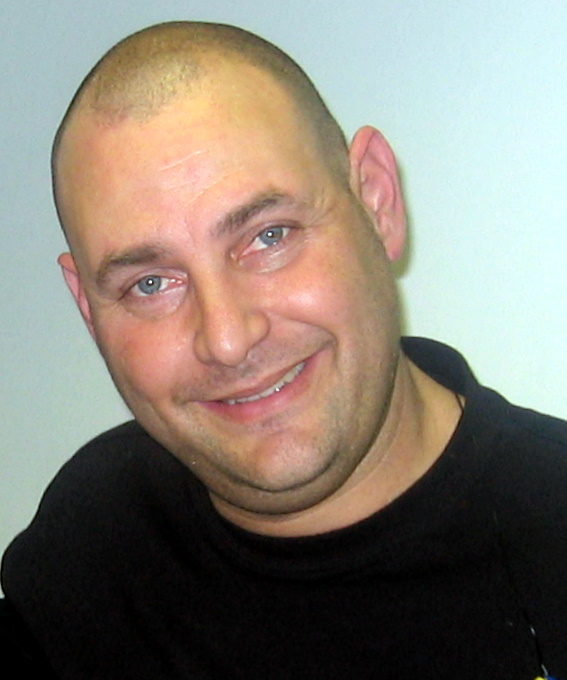
- Zvika Hadar, who portrayed the character.
- First appearance: Ha-Comedy Store
- Portrayed by: Zvika Hadar

In-universe information
- Alias: Jojo Abuksis
- Gender: Male
- Religion: Judaism
- Nationality: Israeli

Jojo Khalastra (Hebrew: ז'וז'ו חלסטרה) was an Israeli satiric character played by Zvika Hadar in 1994–1995.

Initially the character was called Jojo Abuksis, making his TV debut in 1993 on Dudu Topaz's show in 1993.

Jojo Khalastra appeared on The Comedy Store, a show on Israel Television's Channel Two, as the iconic Mizrahi ars, a Hebrew slang term derived from Arabic referring to a stereotyped male character who wears flashy jewelry and clothing. Khalastra in his current form debuted in 1994 and soon became the show's signature character. With his leopard-skin shirt and a trademark hairdo, Khalastra was known for his malapropisms and humorous yet insightful take on social affairs in Israel.

From his name and accent, it is clear that Jojo represents a stereotypical Mizrahi Jew."Khalastra" is an invented word that the character uses to describe his hot-blooded response to perceived slights.

The role of Jojo Khalastra turned Hadar into a cultural icon among young Israelis and the show was deemed a runaway success.

Hadar would find greater success with his own sitcom Shemesh, which referenced Jojo on several occasions, this was intentional as many of the same people involved with The Comedy Store helped make Shemesh.

== See also ==
- Culture of Israel
- Television in Israel
