= Zionist youth movement =

Jewish nationalist organization

A Zionist youth movement (Hebrew: תנועות הנוער היהודיות הציוניות, romanized: tnuot hanoar hayehudiot hatsioniot) is an organization formed for Jewish children and adolescents for educational, social, and ideological development, including a belief in Jewish nationalism as represented in the State of Israel. Youth leaders in modern youth movements use informal education approaches to educate toward the movement's ideological goals.

== History ==
Most Zionist youth movements were established in Eastern Europe in the early twentieth century, desiring the national revival of the Jewish people in their own homeland, and soon formed an active and integral part of the Zionist movement. All emphasised aliyah (emigration to the Land of Israel) and community, with many also focussing on a return to nature.

Blau-Weiss is considered by some to have been the first Zionist youth movement. Established in Germany in 1912, its youth leaders were inspired by the culture of outings and hikes prevalent in the German Youth Movement. Adopting an official Zionist platform in 1922, the movement stressed an agricultural way of life, leading many of its members to the kibbutz movement in Mandatory Palestine.

With the upsurge in European nationalism and antisemitism, pogroms in Eastern Europe, and the barring of Jewish members from German youth groups incubated the Zionist national consciousness of the Jewish youth, appealing to their idealism.

Youth movements played a considerable role in politics, Jewish education, community organisation, and Zionism, particularly between the two world wars. Within Europe, they were the nucleus of the Jewish resistance movements in the ghettos and camps of the Holocaust, and the Jewish partisans. They also led the Beriha or escape from Europe following World War II, particularly to Palestine, where most surviving members settled. According to the International School for Holocaust Studies, the stated aim was bringing Jews to Palestine out of a sense of Zionism. Some also saw immigration to Palestine as a first step towards the survivors' recuperation and return to normal life.

Many of Eastern Europe's movements established themselves as worldwide organisations, although these were less influential. Alumni in Palestine organised their movements there from the 1920s, with an emphasis on pioneering and personal fulfillment (hagshama atzmit). There they strengthened the New Yishuv, particularly building the kibbutz movement and most affiliated with or established Israel's political parties.

After the Israeli Declaration of Independence in 1948, some of the movements' roles, such as education, were taken on by the State. With the growth and development of the country, the movements' aims have been adjusted despite lessened public interest in the pioneering ideals of earlier Zionism.

In the Jewish diaspora, the nature of Zionist youth movements has varied in time and place. During periods when the general Zionist movement has been strong, such as that preceding the Six-Day War, movements have been particularly active. As well as acting towards Zionist causes, the movements have been seen as an important Jewish education and socialisation when it has not been otherwise available. Hence, with the development of stronger community structures, youth movements have often played a lesser role. Many youths, particularly from the large community of American Jews, have opted for Jewish social groups without ideological pursuits.

== Educational methods ==
Youth movements employ informal education methods to educate an ideology to their members. This is often achieved through regular meetings that socialise participants within their groups, as well as camps. Particularly on camps, but in all interactions movements create a counter-culture that produces a particular social environment where members can express themselves freely, although with an underlying focus towards the movement's ideology. Recently, there have been suggestion that youth movement counter-culture is waning, and needs to be revived.

Activities and camps are essentially peer-led, usually by youth leaders who are often a few years older than the participants. Because of this, a friendly relationship is created between leaders and participants that encourages leadership by personal example (dugma ishit), whereby a leader's method of education is by being a moral, active and ideological member of the movement themself.

== Historical movements ==
- Avukah: Founded 1925 by Rabbi Phineas Smoller
- Betar: was established in 1923 in Riga, Latvia and named for the Hebrew initials of Joseph Trumpeldor. Betar was the youth arm of Revisionist Zionism and later the Herut party. Its ideology included territorial ambitions, the establishment of a just society, anti-socialist sentiments, and military training for pioneers.
- Blau-Weiss: Established in Germany in 1912. Emphasized agricultural labor and kibbutz settlement. Disbanded in 1929.
- Bnei Akiva Religious Zionist movement founded in 1929 with a philosophy of Torah Va'Avodah "Torah and Labor".
- Dror: Founded in Russia before the First World War. Emphasized socialist ideology and Jewish self-defense. In 1925 joined with Poalei Zion. In 1938 merged with HeHalutz.
- Ezra: Founded in Germany in 1919 and had some original affiliation with Agudat Israel party.
- Gordonia: 1925–1951. Associated with Labour Zionism and its namesake A. D. Gordon. Founded in Poland, and active in Palestine from 1937. Idealized manual labor, mutual aid and human values. After helping to establish the United Kibbutz Movement, it merged with other youth movements.
- Habonim: Founded in London in 1930 and affiliated with Labor Zionism. In 1958 it was the largest youth Zionist movement with 20,000 members. Its members established many kibbutzim. Merged with HaNoar HaOved VeHaLomed in 1959.
- Hanoar Ha'oved: Established in 1926 by the Histadrut, the General Federation of Jewish Labor. It emphasized active participation in a working society. Merged with Hnoar Ha'oved in 1959 to establish Hanoar Ha'oved Vehalomed and Hanoar Hadati Ha'oved Vehalomed.
- HaNoar HaTzioni: Founded in 1926 by Yitzhak Steiger and established in 1931. The movement contains six kibbutzim in Israel and is formally against teaching young children to believe in a certain political way (like most youth movements at the time). Children are taught to argue and form their own opinion even if that opinion is contrary to the group's opinion. All thoughts are welcome except for extreme ones. Yitzhak Steiger had this idea after leaving the Marxist movement Hashomer Hatzair.
- Haoved Hadati: Founded in Poland in the 1930s by national religious scouts. The Vilna branch was called "Torah Va'Avodah". Later established in the United States with groups in New York, Chicago, Cleveland, and other cities. There was a Hachshara in New Jersey, and a Camp Moshava The Vilna group was established in 1922.
- Hashomer Hatzair: "The Young Guard", a Labor Zionist, secular Jewish youth movement founded in 1913 in the Kingdom of Galicia and Lodomeria, Austria-Hungary
- Hebrew Scouts Movement in Israel
- HeHalutz: First meeting held in Moscow in 1919. Ideology was strongly influenced by Joseph Trumpeldor. In 1935 membership reached 100,000.
- Maccabi Hatzair: Founded in Germany in 1926. In 1933 the youth group was a strong basis for the World Maccabi Organization, which was involved in sports, aliya, and settling Israel.
- HaMahanot HaOlim: " Model Government"; started by groups from the Herzliya Gymnasium in 1926. Eventually merged with Kibbutz Hameuhad.
- Young Judaea: Founded in 1909 in the USA by the Zionist Organization of America. In 1967, Hadassah Women's Zionist Organization of America became its patron.

== Modern movements ==
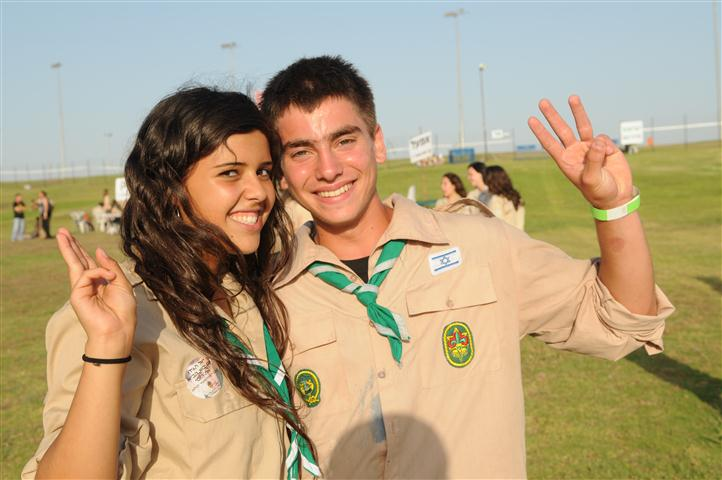
Hebrew Scouts uniform

Zionist youth movements, both in Israel and the diaspora, continue to play a large role in community organisation, Jewish education, welfare, politics and activism. While upholding and adjusting their individual movement ideologies, diaspora movements commonly idealise Jewish continuity and identity in opposition to cultural assimilation, and Zionism in the way of active community involvement while living in Israel (termed by some as aliyah nimshechet or continuing ascent), with importance placed upon leadership skills and personal development. In some countries, resistance in response to anti-Semitism is also a significant political focus.

Movements generally focus on education for school-age youths, who are known as chanichim (Hebrew for educatees; singular chanich or chanicha), approximately aged 8 to 18. The nucleus of movement leaders (madrichim, singular madrich/a; literally guides) are graduates (bogrim, singular boger/et) of the movement, although it is popular for senior chanichim to also lead junior groups.

Much of a movement's activity is carried out through regular meetings or events, in many countries weekly, as well as camps one or more times a year. Leaders use methods of informal education to inspire and teach chanichim within a particular ideological framework or to induce discussion and thought. Such events are also highly social and often involve recreational activity., making the educational and ideological pursuits more enjoyable for participating youths.

=== List of modern movements ===
- AJ6: The Association of Jewish Sixthformers, based in the United Kingdom, with a branch in Shelomi, Israel.
- Ariel (youth movement): 1980–ongoing. Split from Bnei Akiva in Israel, separating its meetings for males and females, and with each branch having its own rabbi for authority.
- BBYO: 1923–ongoing. Formerly associated with B'nai B'rith. Active internationally.
- Beyajad. 1988–ongoing. Active in Monterrey, Mexico.
- Betar: 1923–ongoing. Associated with Revisionist Zionist movement and Likud party. Its members were heavily involved in Jewish resistance in the ghettos of Nazi Eastern Europe. Active internationally and counts with branches in many countries around the world, including 3 new branches recently founded: two in Brazil and one in Italy.
- Bnei Akiva: 1929–ongoing. Associated with Religious Zionism and, in Israel, the National Religious Party (most international branches are apolitical). Ideology of Torah ve'avodah – torah study and contributing to the build-up of the nation. Bnei Akiva claims to be the largest Zionist Youth Movement in the world, with over 50,000, members internationally (35 Countries) with another 100,000 in Israel.
- Canadian Young Judaea: 1917–ongoing. Largest movement in Canada.
- Chazit Hanoar: Politically unaffiliated, Jewish and Zionist education. Active in South America.
- Club Z: 2018–ongoing. Club Z was born out of a need to create an ongoing, comprehensive, and honest Jewish education program for the unaffiliated Jewish teens in the San Francisco Bay Area. Today, Club Z is a national organization for Jewish teens, raising modern-day Zionists who are articulate and knowledgeable leaders.
- Ezra: 1919–ongoing. Religious movement, originally affiliated with the Agudat Yisrael party in Israel. In Palestine from 1936. Has founded many kibbutzim and moshavim and now Ezra Olami works in USA Canada Russia Belarus Ukraine England Germany.
- Federation of Zionist Youth (FZY): 1910–ongoing. (As FZY since 1935). Pluralistic – believes in teaching Jewish and Israeli culture, promoting righteousness, defense of Jewish rights and aliyah.
- Habonim Dror: Merger of Dror (est. 1915) and Habonim Union (1929) in 1980. Associated with Labour Zionism, the United Kibbutz Movement and Labor party. Dror members were among the leaders of the Warsaw ghetto uprising. Active internationally. A secular youth movement.
- Haihud Hahaklai (the Agricultural Union): 1978–ongoing. Associated with a union of agricultural villages, but politically non-partisan. Active in Israel.
- Hamaccabi Hatzair: 1926–ongoing. Founded in Germany, associated with the World Maccabi Jewish sports organisation, while the youth movement also promoted aliya and pioneering through rural settlement.
- HaMahanot HaOlim: 1926–ongoing. Associated with the United Kibbutz Movement. Five principles of pioneering, Zionism, socialism, democracy and humanism. Established originally by Herzlia Gymnasium. Active in Israel.
- Hanoar Hatzioni: 1926–ongoing. Scouting movement with pluralistic outlook. Active in 16 countries worldwide and has a strong belief in Judaism, Zionism and Pluralism, all of which should be looked at in an holistic framework.
- Hanoar Haoved Vehalomed: 1924–ongoing. Established as HaNoar HaOved ("the working youth") by the Histadrut (General Federation of Jewish Labor in Palestine) to meet the social, cultural and education needs of working youth. After merging in 1959 with the Habonim Union, the current movement was formed, "the Working and Student Youth". Active in Israel.
- Hashomer Hatzair: 1913–ongoing. A Zionist-socialist youth movement founded in Galicia (today's Poland). Established what was the Mapam party, following the migration to Israel and founding of kibbutzim by many members in the early 1920s. Its members were heavily involved in Jewish resistance in the ghettos of Nazi Eastern Europe including Mordechai Anielewicz, leader of the Jewish Combat Organization during the Warsaw Ghetto Uprising. Active internationally.
- Hebraikeinu: 1990; Affiliated to Maccabi World Union, established in the club A Hebraica de São Paulo Brazil.
- Hehalutz: 1918–Initially established in Russia under Joseph Trumpeldor to prepare potential olim for labour and pioneering work. Mostly collapsed after World War II (ongoing in Argentina and Mexico only). Active in Latin America.
- Hineni: 1976–ongoing. Modern Orthodox Judaism, Politically Active, Modern Orthodox, Pluralist Zionist movement. Not associated with particular Zionist ideology or party. Active in Australia.
- Hatzofim Haivriim (the Hebrew Scouts): 1919–ongoing. Associated with the world Scouting movement, whose ideals it generally shares. Active in Israel.
- LJY-Netzer: 1947–ongoing. The youth movement of Liberal Judaism (UK) in the UK, they operate under the banner of Progressive Zionism and support a Two State Solution. They became affiliated with Netzer Olami in the early 90s.
- Magshimey Herut: 1999–ongoing. Acitivist movement associated with Revisionist Zionism made up of religious and non-religious young adults. Ideology a combination of retaining the borders of Greater Israel and social activism on behalf of Israel's poor. Affiliated with the Herut party. Active in North America and Israel.
- Netzer: 1979–ongoing. Associated with the World Union for Progressive Judaism. Central focus on Reform Zionism and social activism through tikkun olam (repairing the world). Netzer Olami also claims to be the largest zionist youth movement in the world with over 30,000 members worldwide. Active internationally.
- Noar Masorti or NOAM: Associated with Conservative Judaism. Active in Israel, Argentina, Brazil, Chile, France, Mexico, Spain, Ukraine, Germany, Uganda and the UK.
- NFTY: 1939–ongoing. Formerly the North American Federation of Temple Youth. The organized youth movement of Reform Judaism in North America. Affiliated with the Union for Reform Judaism and Netzer Olami.
- Sinai Youth Movement: 1955–ongoing. Modern Orthodox Judaism. Active in the United Kingdom.
- Tzeirei Ami: 1978–ongoing. Chilean pluralistic Zionist scouting movement. Active in South America. Affiliated with HaNoar HaTzioni.
- United Synagogue Youth: 1951–ongoing. The youth movement of the Conservative Judaism. Affiliated with the United Synagogue of Conservative Judaism. Active in North America.
- Young Judaea: 1909–ongoing. Formerly associated with Hadassah Women's Zionist Organization. Focus on Zionist Jewish identity and social action in a pluralist environment. Active as the largest movement in the USA.

== Preparation (Hachshara) ==
Most diaspora movements organise programmes in Israel, aiming for personal and ideological development, experience and training, such that participants would either remain in Israel as a form of ideological fulfillment or return to their diaspora communities and movements in a leadership capacity. Many of these programs cover most of the year following one's graduation from high school and are known as shnat hachshara (year of preparation) like their predecessors. Most require of their programmes' participants a two-year commitment to their movement on return from the program in Israel.

Many such programmes are coordinated together with the Department for Jewish Zionist Education of the Jewish Agency for Israel, whose Machon L'Madrichei Chutz La'Aretz (Institute for Leaders from Abroad) has been a component in many movements' year programmes since 1946. Year programmes may also include:

- studying at a Jewish educational institution, such as a yeshiva, or independent study programmes
- touring Israel
- volunteer work in a kibbutz; in a development town; with welfare and charity organisations; with the Magen David Adom ambulance service; in schools; on Israeli summer camps; with the IDF in Sar-El at archaeological digs; etc.
- experience or training with the IDF, such as the 8-week Marva Army Experience Program
- a historical tour of Poland and the remains of Nazi Europe

== Fulfillment (Hagshama) ==
As well as education, the movement experience is directed towards hagshama atzmit, or personal fulfillment of one's ideology, often closely aligned with that of their movement. Typically, for a diaspora movement member, this involves immigration to Israel, seen as an ultimate goal of Zionist ideals. Many movements organise groups of participants to take this difficult step together, forming a gar'in of olim (group of immigrants) who are prepared together for the process of aliyah.

== Service Year (Shnat Sherut) ==
In Israel, it is common for active movement participants to commit a year of movement leadership between completing high-school and conscription into the Israel Defense Forces.

== See also ==
- Birthright Israel
- Hakhshara
- Youth aliyah
- Youth group
- Youth village
