= Ha-Comedy Store =

- הקומדי סטור
- Genre: Sketch comedy
- Ending theme: Two Princes by The Spin Doctors
- Country of origin: Israel
- Original language: Hebrew
- No. of seasons: 3
- No. of episodes: 90

Production
- Running time: 30 minutes per episode

Original release
- Network: Channel 2
- Release: 1994 – 1997

Related
- Shemesh

Ha-Comedy Store (Hebrew: הקומדי סטור, 'The Comedy Store') was an Israeli entertainment program which was broadcast on the Israeli Channel 2 between the years 1994-1996. In its prime it starred Zvika Hadar, Assaf Ashtar, Ruby Duenyas, Gil Sassover and Itai Segev.

The show scheduled weekly consisted different short nonsense styled skits including recurring nooks, such as "JoJo Ticked-Off" (החלסטרה של ז'וז'ו, HaKhalastra shel Jojo) and "Jacques' Bulletin" (המבזק של ז'ק, HaMivzak shel Jaqcues) and music segments which were mostly parodies of famous Israeli songs.

During the first seasons, the show won a great success, and coined a number of unique expressions to the Hebrew language such as "Laflaf" (לפלף, 'nerd'; plural 'laflafim' לפלפים), "Khalastra" (חלסטרה, a slang word used by 'JoJo' to describe his resent and anger at various things on his nook 'JoJo Ticked-Off'). The character which is mostly remembered and identified with the show is apparently Jojo Halastra, played by Tzvika Hadar, which was a parody on the Israeli Ars.

In 1995, a "Ha-Comedy Store" album was released containing all of the most popular songs and skits.

After the third season the shows' popularity descended after some of the actors left the show.

== Cast ==
- Zvika Hadar (1994-1995)
- Assaf Ashtar
- Ruby Duenyas
- Gil Sassover
- Itai Segev (1994-1995)
- Erez Ben Harush (1994)
- Rubi Moskovitz (1994)
- Lior Halfon (1995-1996)
- Yaniv Katzir (1995-1996)
- Arik Silbermann (1994)

== See also ==
- Jojo Khalastra
- Ofer Idels and Roni Cohen, "Israeli Nonsense: humor, globalization and vegetables during the early nineties," Humor, (2024): 1-16.
