= Young Judaea =

American Zionist youth movement

Young Judaea Global, Inc.
- Formation: 1909; 117 years ago
- Tax ID no.: 45-2640858
- Legal status: 501(c)(3) nonprofit organization
- Purpose: Zionist youth movement
- Headquarters: 575 8th Avenue, 11th floor
- Location: New York, New York, United States
- Coordinates: 40°45′18″N 73°59′30.5″W
- Region served: United States
- President: Mike Berman
- Chief Executive Officer: Adina Frydman
- Subsidiaries: Young Judaea Camp Tel Yehudah Inc, Young Judaea Sprout Lake Camp Inc, Friends of Sprout Lake Inc; Camp Young Judaea Midwest
- Revenue: $5,254,837 (2014)
- Expenses: $8,873,322 (2014)
- Employees: 29 (2013)
- Volunteers: 46 (2013)
- Website: youngjudaea.org

Young Judaea is an American peer-led Zionist youth movement that runs programs throughout the United States for Jewish young people in grades 2–12. In Hebrew, Young Judaea is called Yehuda Hatzair (יהודה הצעיר) or is sometimes referred to as Hashachar (השחר) (lit. "the dawn"). Founded in 1909, the nonprofit organization is the oldest Zionist youth movement in the United States.

== History and organization ==
Founded in 1909, Young Judaea is a peer-led youth movement. Its programs include youth clubs, conventions, camps and Israel programs with an emphasis on social action and Jewish identity. Young Judaea has 15 regions in the United States and is affiliated with the Federation of Zionist Youth (United Kingdom) and Tzofim (Israel). The age levels are Ofarim (Hebrew for "fawns"; grades 2–5), Tsofim ("scouts"; grades 6–7), and Bogrim ("elders"; grades 8–12). Young Judaea's university arm was formerly called HaMagshimim, meaning "the fulfillers"), now college programs focus primarily on volunteering and interning in Israel as well as birthright trips.

In 1967, Hadassah became the sponsor of Young Judaea. During this period, Young Judaea grew to become the largest Zionist youth movement in America. It took on Tikkun Olam as a fundamental pillar, becoming involved in the national civil rights and Soviet Jewry movements and helping local communities across the country.

In 1997, Young Judaea entered into partnerships with its two sister movements: the Hebrew Scouts Movement in Israel (Tzofim); and the Federation of Zionist Youth (FZY) in the United Kingdom. This was done to strengthen the connection between Jewish, Zionist youth in Israel and the diaspora. These partnerships are said to have allowed for a greater exchange of ideas and experiences, fostering a stronger sense of global Jewish identity and commitment to the Zionist cause.

After almost 70 years of association with Hadassah, Young Judaea moved toward organizational independence in 2012. Despite the change, the movement continued to grow, learn, and build new experiences for the next generations of Judaeans.

== Principles ==
All Young Judaea programs are centered around the movement's ideology. The charter of the organization, officially titled "Yehudah Hatzair Leumi Chukah," outlines the ideology and goals of the organization. Its main points include:

- Young Judaea is a politically non-partisan and religiously pluralistic organization.
- Young Judaea is a Zionist youth movement, recognizes the State of Israel as a central part of Jewish life and encourages visiting Israel.
- As a Jewish youth movement, Young Judaea stresses Jewish values, Jewish education, and the preservation of the identity of the Jewish people.
- Social action is a part of both the Jewish and Zionist identities and as such Young Judaea works to help Jews and others in need both local and worldwide.
- A cohesive community can be built regardless of religious and political affiliations.

== Leadership ==
Young Judaea is a peer-run organization with mazkiriyot (boards) of peer leaders on local, regional, and national levels.

The National Mazkirut is elected at Young Judaea's National Midwinter Convention by a convention body consisting of Bogrim (9th-12th grade members of the movement). The National Mazkirut serves for a one-year period.

The regional Mazkirut activity levels varie throughout the country. Most regions with an active mazkirut contain at least some of the positions listed below.

=== Young Judaea leadership positions ===
- Mazkir or Mazkira (literally: "secretary") This position is president of the Mazkirut.
- Merakez/et Irgun (literally: organizational coordinator) This position is the Administrative Vice President (AVP) of the Mazkirut. Responsibilities include finances, membership, and logistics for the national level and overseeing the regional AVPs, along with acting as general Vice President to the Mazkir. The Midwest Region of Young Judaea divides the position of AVP into an AVP of Logistics and an AVP of Finance.
- Merakzei Chinuch (literally: educational coordinators) These positions create educational programming for each of the different age groups. Prior to the mid-1990s there was one national coordinator for all of the age groups.
  These positions exist on both a national and regional levels with the national level coordinators assisting the regional ones.
  - Bogrim. This position creates curriculum and activities for the Bogrim (8th–12th grade) age group. Responsibilities include programming for the Bogrim National Midwinter Convention and National Summer Convention.
  - Ofarim/Tsofim. This position creates curriculum and activities for the Ofarim and Tsofim (2nd–7th grade) age group. Responsibilities include programming, encouraging members to attend Ofarim/Tsofim regional summer camps and encouraging continuing participation in Young Judea after finishing the Ofarim/Tsofim age level.
- Merakez/et Tikkun Olam v'Yisroel Social Action and Israel Programmer (SAIP). This position develops social action events and ensures that tikkun olam values are built into all programs at the national level and regional levels. Their educational focus is defined by tikkun groups—different social action groups formed that are focused on five different issues (threats to Israel, pikuach nefesh, environmentalism, human rights, and poverty). They also manage volunteer opportunities for participants. Along with that, the National SAIP is in charge of updating Young Judaeans on Israeli current events.
- Pirsumim (literally: "advertising") This position is responsible for publishing newsletters, informational documents and advertisements for the movement. This includes the national online newsletter (Kol Ha'Tnua; literally "voice of the movement), event promotion, web pages, and press releases.
- Merakez/et Havurah Metahnenet (Russian Programming Coordinator) This position plays the role of coordinating events and programming in relations to Machaneh Tel Yehudah’s Havurah Program. Machaneh Tel Yehudah’s Havurah program is a part of Young Judaea to inspire Russian-speaking Jews to strengthen their identity, culture, and heritage in a unique community. S/he must engage the Russian-Jewish community to influence their self-identity.
- National Zarit (international Liaison) Enhances communication and programming between YJers international

== Merchavim and regions (past and present) ==
Young Judaea was traditionally divided into five units, called Merchavim (the singular: Merchav), which were titled according to their geographical location in the United States (including Puerto Rico). The Merchavim were subdivided into geographical regions. In the past each region was composed of clubs on the local level although this practice has all but ceased. Until the mid-1970s, the regions were referred to using English language names. more recently the regions were referred to using Hebrew language names.

The two Merchavim with active mazkiriyot are:

- The Midwest Merchav is composed of Pneinu Artza (the Great Plains – North Dakota, South Dakota, Nebraska, Kansas, Missouri, Iowa, Minnesota, Wisconsin, Illinois, and Indiana), Ayelet Hashachar (the central states – Michigan, Ohio, West Virginia, Kentucky), and Ruach B'Tzion (western Pennsylvania, abbreviated WPA)
- The Northeast Merchav contains Ya'ar Penn (eastern Pennsylvania, abbreviated "EPA"), Empiria (English: Empire – New York state, excluding Long Island and New York City, and Fairfield County, Connecticut), Ganei Yehudah (New Jersey), Eeyey Tsiyon (Long Island/New York City abbreviated "LINYC" or "LI/NYC"), and Uri Tsafon (New England – Maine, Vermont, New Hampshire, Rhode Island, Massachusetts, and Connecticut, excluding Fairfield County)

The three Merchavim without active mazkiriyot are:

- The Southeast Merchav (known colloquially as "Boom Boom") contains G'lil Yam (North Carolina, minus Hendersonville and Asheville, Virginia, Maryland, Delaware, and the District of Columbia), Or Hadarom (Florida minus the Panhandle and Puerto Rico), and Lev Hadarom (Georgia, Alabama, Mississippi, Tennessee. South Carolina, Arkansas, eastern Louisiana, the Florida Panhandle, and western North Carolina)
- The Southwest Merchav is a single region, Ookaf Hadarom (Texas, Oklahoma and western Louisiana)
- The West Merchav contains Chagurat Hashemesh (Arizona, New Mexico, Colorado, Utah, Wyoming, and Montana), Ruach Hama'arav (Nevada and California), and Yoreh (Washington state, Oregon and Idaho)

The Northeast Merchav currently has three mazkiriyot in Empire, LINYC, and New Jersey. The three mazkiriyot act mostly independently although they plan a convention together, traditionally held at the end of the school year. The northeast is considered to be the most active area for regular Young Judaea programming.

The Midwest Merchav currently operates with one merchav wide Mazkirut. This Mazkirut traditionally plans a convention held in early march each year. Midwest also still maintains the only traditional "club" left in Young Judaea in Pittsburgh. This club has regular meeting and events and is run by a Va'ad (small group of teens with a certain task) and assisted by a parent volunteer. The Chicago area has sporadic programming run by a combination of local members and the merchav wide Mazkirut.

No other merchavim or regions have currently active mazkiriyot.

== Programs ==
=== Conventions ===
Conventions are central to the Young Judaea experience. They fall into two categories: Merchav/Regional, and National. Merchav/Regional Conventions are organized by the local Regional/Merchav Mazkirut, there are two a year and are held in late fall/early winter and spring. During these conventions, regional Mazkirut are elected. Typical convention programming features educational workshops called sadnaot, educational activities called peulot, prayers, and plenty of chofesh (free time) for socializing. The National Midwinter convention takes place every year during Presidents' Day weekend. National Summer Convention is held in mid-August at Camp Tel Yehudah. Both of these conventions are open to any member of the movement in 9th through 12th grade. At the Midwinter Convention the movement elects a new National Mazkirut and makes amendments to the Chukah (the movement's constitution). At the Summer Convention, the newly elected members of the National Mazkirut are sworn in and changes are made to the Chukah.

=== Summer camps ===
Like many other youth movements, YJ operates summer camps for its members. The age restrictions and age groups and differ by each YJ camp and their different policies/ programming. For example, Camp Judaea in North Carolina starts at Rishonim (Campers going into grades 1, 2, and 3) and goes through Offarim (Campers going into grade 4), Oranim (Campers going into grade 5), Sayarim (Campers going into grade 6), Tsofim (Campers going into grade 7), Kesher (Campers going into grade 8), Bogrim (Campers going into grade 9), and Tikkun Olam/ Chalutzim (Campers going into grade 10.)

- Camp Young Judaea Midwest in Waupaca, Wisconsin
- Camp Young Judaea Texas in Wimberley, Texas
- Camp Young Judaea Sprout Lake in Verbank, New York
- Camp Young Judaea Sprout Brooklyn Brooklyn, New York
- Camp Young Judaea Sprout Westchester Croton-On-Hudson, New York
- Camp Judaea in Hendersonville, North Carolina

Tel Yehudah allows teens going in to the 9th grade, 10th grade, 11th grade, and 12th grade to attend. Although some YJ camps age group programs overlap with the ages at Tel Yehudah. For example, Camp Judaea still has Bogrim and Tikkun Olam/ Chalutzim while TY starts its first 2 years, many campers either choose to waive the first and/or second year of TY to finish their camps programming, or they can choose to go during another session, (bloc at TY).

Camp Tel Yehudah, the national teen leadership Camp in Barryville, New York. Programs there include Alumim (Jewish/Israeli history and development of a Jewish Identity for entering 9th graders), Yachad (community building for entering 10th graders), Hadracha (leadership and activism for entering 11th graders), and Alternative Summer Break (an immersive community service program open to rising 10th–12th graders). Tel Yehudah has two sessions that are each three and a half weeks long.

The Alumim age group includes two days of hiking, one day of rafting on the Delaware River, and a one-day trip to a big city (often either Philadelphia or New York City). The Yachad age group includes the choice of a four-day kayaking, hiking, biking, photography or volunteering trip in Manhattan. The Hadracha age group goes to Washington, D.C. for four days on "Day on the Hill" to meet with national leaders and representatives and discuss specific modern-day issues, as well as national advocacy organizations.

=== Israel programs ===
As a Zionist movement, Israel trips are a crucial part of the Young Judaea experience. Youth entering 11th–12th grade can spend several weeks in Israel through Gesher Israel.

Recent high school graduates can also apply to spend 9 months on the Young Judaea Year Course in Israel program. Young Judaeans participating in Young Judaea Year Course are often able to transfer credits received on Year Course to their college. The basic Year Course program is broken up into sections with participants spending four months living in Jerusalem, four months living in Tel Aviv with the option to spend two of those months participating in Marva, training and serving as a junior medic, volunteering, interning, living on a kibbutz, and finally one month exploring special interests around the country. Young Judaea Year Course differentiates itself from most other movement freshman year abroad programs by immersing participants in Israeli life. Participants are encouraged to become part of Israeli society for their year in Israel. There are also many specialty tracks catering to participants' hobbies or interests, including fitness and business.

Young Judaea alumni founded Kibbutz Ketura together with members of the Hebrew Scouts in 1973.

=== Social activism ===
Young Judaea has been active in social action projects including involvement in bringing constituencies to Darfur rallies and raising funds for victims of Hurricane Katrina.

Young Judaea has raised nearly $30,000 for various causes, including Hadassah Hospital, the Arava Institute for Environmental Studies, and Latet, all in Israel. In the fall of 2005, after Hurricane Katrina ravaged the Gulf Coast, Young Judaea embarked on a program called Caravan 4 Katrina. The "Caravan" consisted of four truckloads (two from the Northeastern U.S. and two from the Southeastern U.S.) of food, toys, and clothes were collected and delivered to Katrina victims in Jackson, Mississippi in time for Thanksgiving.

Another activism program Young Judaea leads is an annual Alternative Winter Break. Starting in 2007, participants traveled to different regions of the United States to perform community service and learn about the culture of the region. Previous trips have included New Orleans LA; Navajo Nation AZ; New York City, NY; Los Angeles, CA; Southern Florida; and Puerto Rico.

== Songs ==
Singing is a large part of Young Judaea camps around America. The official song of Young Judaea is Ani v'Ata by Arik Einstein. Many songs sung in Young Judaea can be found in the Young Judaea shiron (song book).

== Alumni ==
A number of Young Judaea alumni groups have been established. There is an online Young Judaea alumni blog, the Chorsha.

Four alumni from the camp in Sprout Lake -- MLB.com reporter Jonathan Mayo, Daniel Miller, Jeremy Newberger, and Seth Kramer, of Ironbound Films -- were the producers of Heading Home: The Tale of Team Israel, a 2018 award-winning documentary film about the Israel national baseball team competing for the first time in the World Baseball Classic.

== See also ==
- Zionist youth movements
- Federation of Zionist Youth
- Givat Massuah
- Guide to the Hadassah Archives on Long-term Deposit at the American Jewish Historical Society
