= Federation of Zionist Youth =

The Federation of Zionist Youth (FZY) is Britain's oldest Jewish, Zionist, pluralist youth movement, founded in 1910. It is affiliated with Young Judaea in the United States and the Hebrew Scouts movement in Israel. It runs weekly activities, political campaigns, year-long programmes and summer programmes for hundreds of young British Jews.

Ideologically, FZY's vision statement is: "The Jewish People, living in peace in the State of Israel as One Nation and as a Light Unto the Nations."

FZY's Jewish, Zionist, pluralist ideology is committed to four aims:

- Tarbut – Jewish culture
- Tzedaka – values of charity and righteousness
- Magen – defence of Jewish rights
- Aliyah nimshechet – moving to Israel and continuing to do good for the state

== FZY centenary year ==
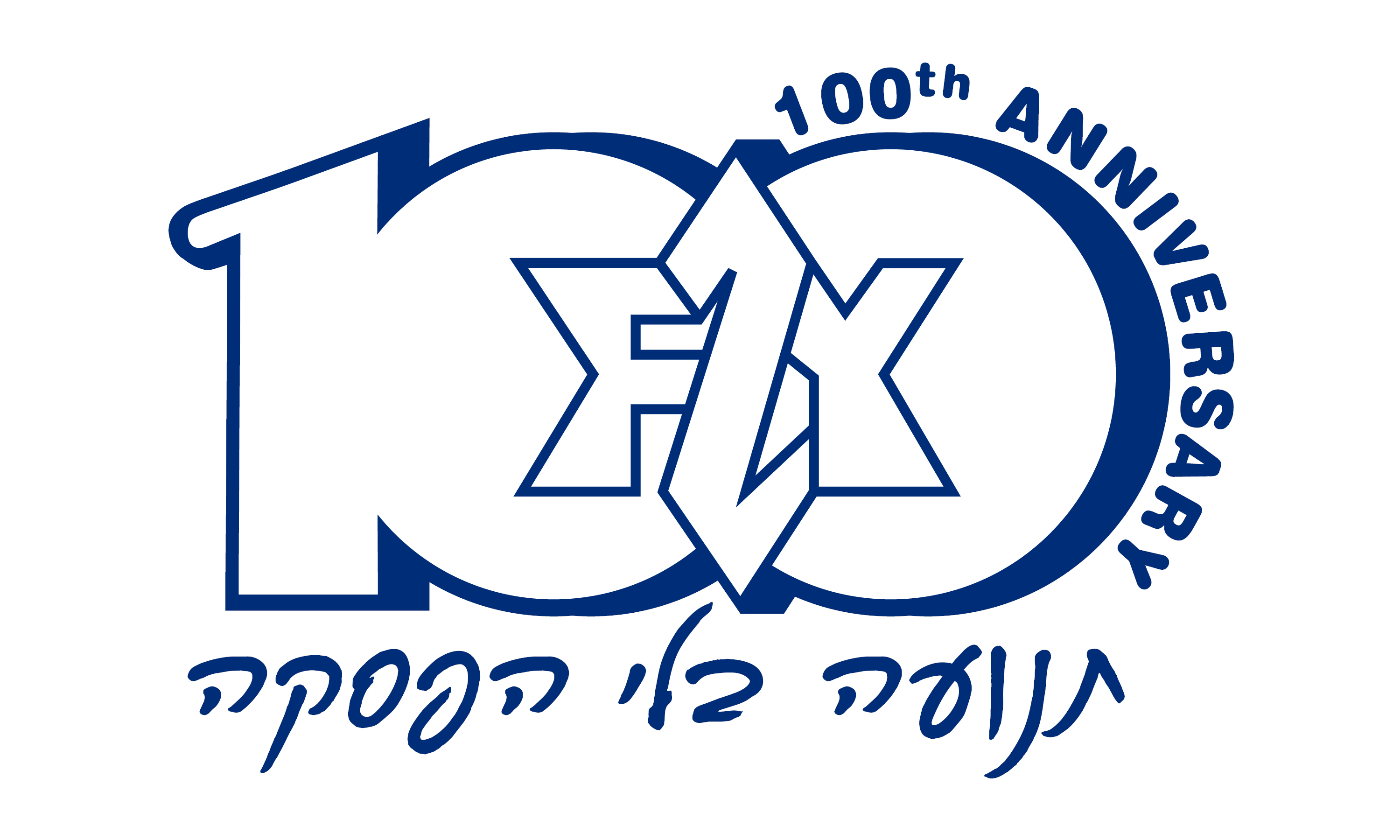
Official FZY logo for its 100th anniversary

In 2009/2010 FZY celebrated 100 years since its founding. To commemorate its centenary year it chose a new logo and organised a number of celebratory events.
