= Dudu Faruk =

Israeli musical artist

Dudu Faruk דודו פארוק
- Born: Ori Comay; 21 October 1996 (age 30)
- Occupations: Rapper; singer; actor
- Years active: 2013–present

Ori Comay (Hebrew: אורי קומאי; born 21 October 1996), better known by his stage name Dudu Faruk (Hebrew: דודו פארוק), is an Israeli rapper, singer and actor. His musical style is trap integrated with mizrahi music. The typical lyrics of his songs are blunt, include explicit references to violence and sex, yet also humorous.

== Early life ==
Comay grew up in the neighborhood of Ma'oz Aviv in the north of Tel Aviv. He attended the multidisciplinary school Lady Davis in Ne'ot Afeka.

== Career ==
Comay first created the mock persona "Dudu Faruk" when he was a high school student in 2013, as a parody Instagram account.

Faruk's manner of speaking and the clothes that he wears, usually a white tank top and baseball cap, are associated with the trope of an ars.

Comay later began recording and releasing songs in Faruk's character. His independent videoclips first achieved online virality around 2017.

In January 2019 Faruk appeared, in character, in a live interview on the popular television talk show Ofira and Berkovic. The hosts confronted him, demanded that he will expose his real identity, and criticized his provocative lyrics. Faruk failed to answer them, and eventually walked out before the interview was supposed to end. The incident shattered his fake persona, and caused severe damage to his career.

== Controversy ==
Faruk's songs contain explicit, violent and chauvinistic lyrics, yet he became extremely popular among teens and kids, which concerned parents' organizations. The chairwoman of the Women's International Zionist Organization in Israel, Gila Oshrat, formally requested from Hadera mayor, Zvi Gendelman, and from then minister of Culture and Sports, Miri Regev, to cancel Faruk's show at the Boom Box Festival.

== Discography ==
=== Studio albums ===
- Osef Hachashmal (2018)
- Shhh... (2021)
