= Camp Young Judaea Texas =

Jewish summer camp in Woodcreek, Texas

Coordinates: 30.027°N 98.118°W

- Location: Woodcreek, Texas, U.S.
- Type: Summer camp
- Operated by: Young Judaea
- Established: 1952
- Website: cyjtexas.org

Camp Young Judaea Texas, commonly known as CYJ Texas, is a Jewish overnight summer camp and retreat center located in the Texas Hill Country. Founded in 1952, CYJ Texas is affiliated with Young Judaea.

== History ==
Camp Young Judaea Texas was established in 1952 by Young Judaea. In its initial year, approximately 100 children from across Texas attended the camp, which was then rented from "Camp Christian" in Center Point, Texas. The camp was founded with the goal of strengthening religious identity and fostering Zionist beliefs. The establishment of the camp was funded by bank loans and private donations.

In 1971, the camp moved to its current location in Woodcreek, Texas.

The camp's 2020 season was cancelled due to the COVID-19 pandemic.

In 2024, the camp offered scholarships to 16 Israeli campers, in response to the October 7 attacks on Israel in 2023.

== Campus and facilities ==
CYJ Texas is situated on a campus in Woodcreek, Texas. Key facilities include:

- Dining Hall (Chadar Ochel): The 10,400-square-foot dining hall has a seating capacity for 600 campers and staff
- Camper Cabins (Tzrifim): The camp has 22 cabins, designed to accommodate up to 28 campers and eight staff per session
- Auditorium (Bar Yadin Beit Ha'am): A 15,000-square-foot auditorium used for communal gatherings and events.
- The Jodi Braham Center for Arts, Crafts & Design (Merkaz Omanut)
- Aquatic Center: Features a large free-form pool with a mushroom water feature and two waterslides (one open, one closed). The camp also offers waterfront activities at a lake, including paddleboarding, boating, and fishing. Future plans include an expanded Aqua Park.
- Ropes Courses: includes both a low ropes course for teamwork and a high ropes course (approximately 50 feet high) with three different levels and a zip-line element
- Sports Center: An 18,000-square-foot facility with a basketball court and an indoor soccer pitch. The camp also has outdoor sports facilities.

The camp also serves as a retreat center outside of the summer season, hosting events such as family reunions, corporate conferences, and religious retreats. In 2017, the camp announced plans to build a new "retreat village," which would add 42 rooms to the campus.
