= Barryville, New York =

Coordinates: 41°28′39″N 74°54′40″W

- Hamlet and CDP
- Hamlet of Barryville
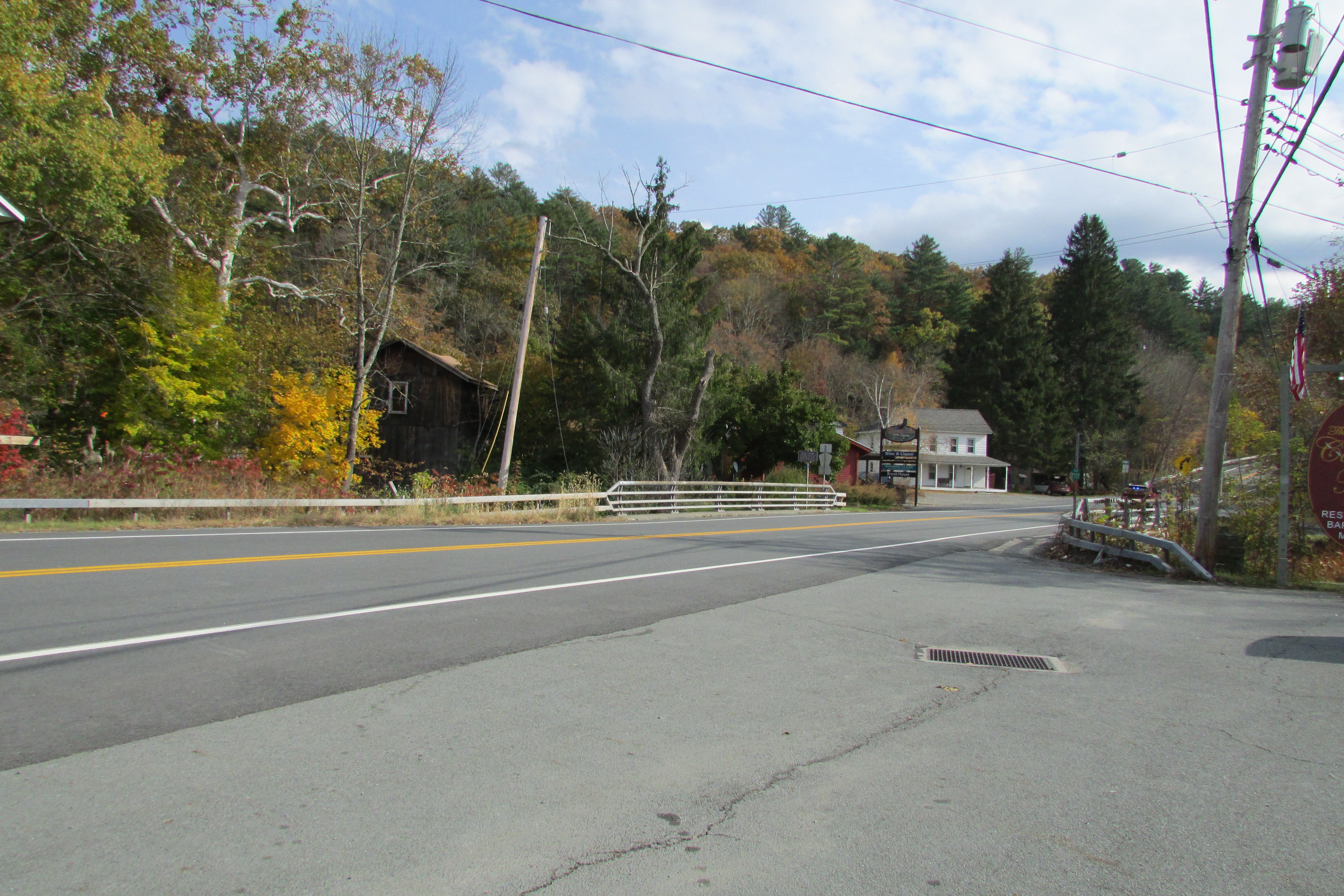
- NY 97 leading into Barryville
- Interactive map of Barryville, New York
- Country: United States
- State: New York
- County: Sullivan
- Town: Highland
- Established: 1853
- ZIP code: 12719
- Area code: 845
- Website: townofhighlandny.com

Barryville is a hamlet (and census-designated place) in Highland, Sullivan County, New York, United States. As of the 2020 census, Barryville had a population of 222. Previously known as "The River," the hamlet was renamed for William T. Barry, postmaster general under President Andrew Jackson.

== History ==
Barryville is a hamlet in the Town of Highland. The town was created by an act of the County Board of Supervisors on December 17, 1853. The Town of Lumberland was subdivided into the present day Towns of Lumberland, Highland and Tusten because the traveling distance for town meetings was too great. The town takes its name from highland ridges above the Delaware River. It was first inhabited by the Lenape and the trappers of Minisink and Mamakating. Colonial period hunters, trappers and lumbermen were drawn to Highland because of its streams and lakes, dense hardwood and conifer forests and wild game.

On July 22, 1779, the Upper Delaware's only major battle of the American Revolutionary War, the Battle of Minisink was fought on the plateau above Minisink Ford, New York. The battle was fought between the colonial militia of Goshen who suffered a devastating defeat against a group of Indians and Tories commanded by Mohawk Chieftain Joseph Brant. Highland was settled sometime after the War towards the turn of the century. The former hamlet of Lumberland Post Office, now Eldred, was established by 1814.

Delaware and Hudson Canal on the Delaware River in Barryville, NY. Provisions for educating the children of the inhabitants were made shortly after the first settlement in the town. The first store was opened in 1828 and the first tavern in 1830. Barryville developed with the construction of the Delaware and Hudson Canal in 1828. A blacksmith shop, a gristmill and a broomhandle factory were established in Barryville shortly thereafter. Later a glass factory opened which made molded glass. The town grew with the canal, providing a large maintenance area and supply depot for its canal worker. Between 1827 and 1898 the D&H Canal carried coal from the Moosic Mountains of Pennsylvania to the coal markets of New York City.

The later development of the Erie Railroad (now Norfolk Southern) helped in the development of the resort communities of Yulan and Highland Lake. By the early part of the twentieth century, the town's major industry was catering to the summer visitors who traveled to Highland via the railroad. When the Erie Railroad ceased to carry passengers and the automobile became the main mode of transportation, Highland slowly emerged as a second home community. Many persons began to purchase homes for weekend, vacation and summer use. Today there are a good number of people who now make Highland their primary residence while commuting to the New York metropolitan area to work.

Erie Railroad Many of the people who live in the town today are descendants of early settlers. The historical and architectural resources of Highland are rich and quite diverse in character. Among the most important are Locks No. 68, No. 69 and No. 70 of the D&H Canal, the Toll House, the Roebling Aqueduct, the Barryville Town Hall, the Barryville Congregational Church and Montoza Cemetery.

Locks No.'s 68, 69 and 70 of the Delaware and Hudson Canal (D&H Canal) are three of the 108 that once existed along the Canal. It was used primarily for the transportation of coal by barge from the Pennsylvania mountains to New York City and extended from Honesdale, Pennsylvania to Kingston, New York. The Canal was in active use from 1828 until 1898. The No. 68 and No. 70 locks are in good shape for historic interpretation. Lock No. 69 is thought to be largely intact, although its present owner filled it in 1981.

The Toll House stands on the New York side of the Roebling Bridge and was built somewhere between 1900 and 1905. This small, two-story structure served as the toll house for the Lackawaxen Bridge (Roebling Aqueduct) after the D&H Canal was closed. The Roebling Aqueduct is believed to be the oldest suspension bridge in America. Built by John Roebling, designer of the Brooklyn Bridge, it carried the D&H Canal across the river. After 50 years of use as an aqueduct, it became a highway bridge in 1898. The bridge consists of four spans, 132 feet to 142 feet, the widest to allow logging rafts to pass through. The bridge is a National Historic Landmark and a National Historic Civil Engineering Landmark. The National Park Service purchased and restored it several years ago.

The Barryville Town Hall is a relatively intact mid-nineteenth century schoolhouse of typical form. It is built in the Greek Revival style with stucco-covered rubble stone incised to resemble cut marble blocks. The building was used as a schoolhouse from 1867 to 1960. The town is seeking funds to restore the deteriorating exterior walls and foundation. The building has been converted for judicial use, including making it handicapped accessible.

The original Congregational Church in Barryville was organized in 1799, but the first church structure was not erected until 1835. Known as the Union Church, this structure burned in 1877 and was replaced by the present day structure in 1903. The church is no longer used for religious purposes, but its owner has adaptively reused it, preserving its historical integrity. A cemetery behind the church is the resting place for several Confederate soldiers killed on July 15, 1864, when a train carrying 833 prisoners of war to the federal prison at Elmira, NY collided with a coal train at Shohola. Nineteen guards and 51 soldiers were killed in the accident; some were buried along the tracks; the others were laid to rest in the Congregational Church Cemetery.

The Montoza Cemetery is located north of Barryville on Mail Road. It was laid out by John W. Johnson, a Barryville attorney who also wrote Reminiscences, an invaluable set of recollections of the early history of the area that has been published with the help of the town. Stones in the cemetery date back to 1861. Still older stones are found in the old Eldred Cemetery.

Other outstanding historical and architectural resources include the Eldred Congregational Church, St. Anthony's Cemetery, the Chapin Estate Stone Arch Waterfalls and the Minisink Battleground and Monument.

Camp Tel Yehudah Barryville is the home of Camp Tel Yehudah, a Young Judaea summer camp. The camp is home to campers from across the United States and a few places international locations including Israel and the United Kingdom.

== Trivia ==
The Delaware River section between Narrowsburg and Barryville is considered a good spot for smallmouth fishing.

Spring House was listed on the National Register of Historic Places in 2009.

== See also ==
- Barryville Chamber of Commerce
- History Walk and Brochure
