= Spring House (Barryville, New York) =

- U.S. National Register of Historic Places
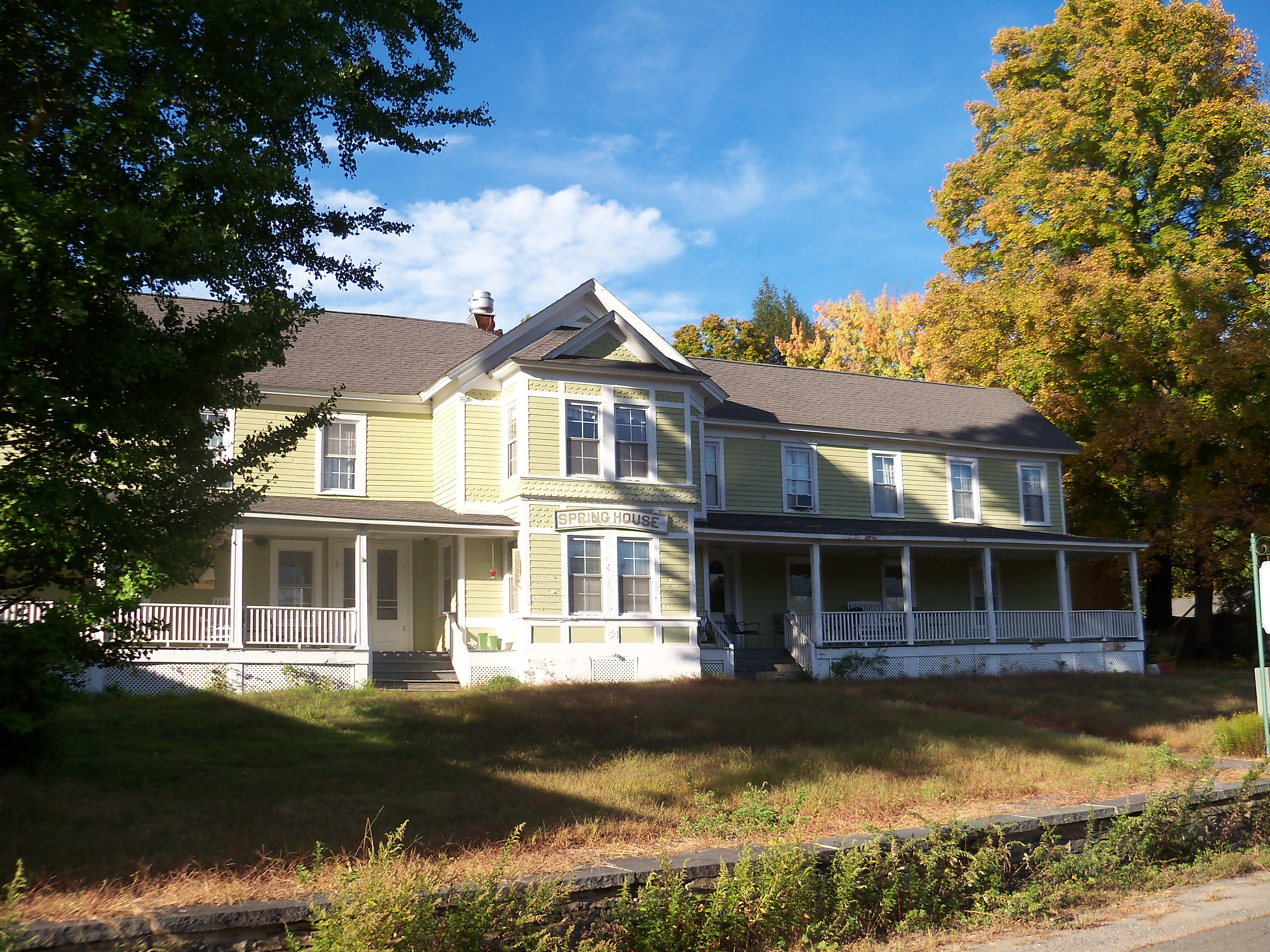

- Location within New York Location within the United States
- Nearest city: 54 River Rd., Barryville, New York
- Coordinates: 41°28′41.38″N 74°55′7.13″W
- Area: 1.79 acres (0.72 ha)
- Built: 1880; 146 years ago
- NRHP reference No.: 09000970
- Added to NRHP: December 2, 2009

Spring House is a historic inn located at Barryville in Sullivan County, New York. It was built as a residence about 1880 and almost immediately enlarged as a hotel and boarding house. The original house is the 2-story main block with gable roof, a small south gable-roofed wing, and a two-by-two-bay rear wing. Long narrow wings were added shortly after the original construction. It is now configured as a long, narrow, rectangular building, two stories tall, eleven bays wide and two bays wide with a 2 1/2-story cross-gabled center section.

It was added to the National Register of Historic Places in 2009.
