= Hebrew Scouts Movement in Israel =

Hebrew Scouts Movement in Israel תנועת הצופים העבריים בישראל
- Headquarters: Philips House
- Country: Israel
- Founded: 1919
- Founder: Aryeh Croch
- Membership: 100,000
- Chairman: Raz Pearl
- General Secretary: Cali Cohen
- Website zofim.org.il

The Hebrew Scouts Movement in Israel (Hebrew: תנועת הצופים העבריים בישראל, Tnuat HaTzofim HaIvriyim BeYisrael) is an Israeli Jewish co-ed Scouting and Guiding association with about 100,000 members. The Hebrew Scouts Movement is now the largest youth movement in Israel.

It is a member of the Israel Boy and Girl Scouts Federation, which is a member of the World Organization of the Scout Movement (WOSM) and the World Association of Girl Guides and Girl Scouts (WAGGGS).

Established in 1919, the Tzofim (Hebrew Scouts Movement) was the first Zionist youth movement in Israel and remains today the largest "National Youth Movement" in the country. Tzofim is famously known as the first egalitarian scouting movement in the world, where boys and girls participate together on an equal basis.

== History ==
=== Establishment ===
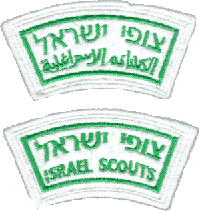
Israel Scouts Badges

The organization was established during Passover of 1919 by some youth and sports associations, including the "Meshotetim" association and the "Herzliya" association that held activities in the format of the founder of world scouting, Baden-Powell. As the head of the movement elected Zvi Nishri. The connection between the associations was loose if at all and it was not yet a fully consolidated movement in every sense of the word.

The first Scout tribe, "Meshotetei BaCarmel" in the Hadar neighborhood of Haifa, was established in 1925 by the Haifa's Reali School. It was initiated by a teacher – Aryeh Croch (who later stood for many years at the head of the Hebrew Scouts Movement).

In 1939, the religious Scouts, named "Adat HaTzofim" joined to the Hebrew Scout Movement with the leadership of Asher Rivlin as the head of Jewish religious scouting in Israel.

In the 1940s the movement sent the best scouting graduates to the Palmach. During that time the center of the movement was in the north of the country and the Palmach recruits were trained on the "Reali" school ground before joining to the organization. The Hebrew Scout Movement in Israel also sent its graduates across the country to create Jewish settlements and Hebrew labor, as part of the establishment of the new Jewish state.

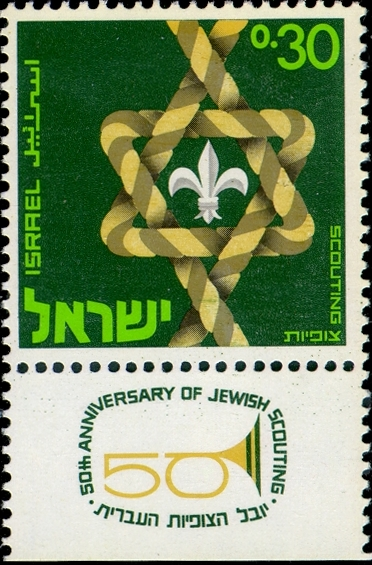
Israeli postal stamp, 1968

=== 1950s split ===
In 1951, during the split of HaKibbutz HaMeuhad there was also a split in the Hebrew Scouts Movement. Most members of the movement wanted to preserve its democratic and non-partisan character.

At the Movement's Council, which met in October 1950, it was decided to add to the Hebrew Scouts Movement principles in opposition to totalitarian regimes (communism, fascism). Following this decision, supporters of Mapam, who supported communism, broke away from the movement, and created in May 1951, the "Pioneering Scout movement" who joined after a short time the "HaMahanot HaOlim" youth movement, that was also associated with KM and Mapam.

The Hebrew Scouts Movement remained in contact with the United Kibbutz Movement, which was informally identified with Mapai, and not with the communist ideology.

=== Tzofim Tzabar Olami ===
In the 1970s, the first chapter of the Hebrew Scouts outside of Israel was established. It was originally established in New York City as "Shevet Tzabar" (Today known as "Shevet Tapuach"). Established by the Shaliach of the Jewish Agency, it jumpstarted a movement of the Tzofim all over the United States, Canada, Europe, and more.

In 2009, Tzabar tribes were established also in Ukraine, Moldova and the United Kingdom, and "Tzofim Tzabar Olami" organization came to reality, as part of the Hebrew Scouts Movement in Israel, managing Israeli Scouts overseas worldwide.

== Today ==
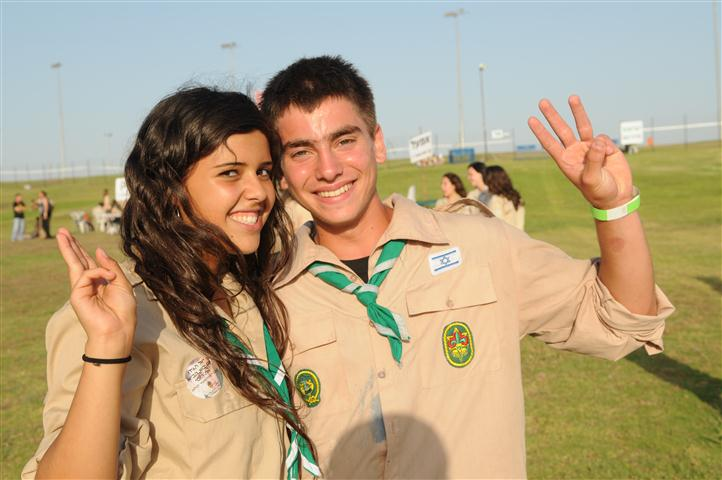
Hebrew Scouts uniform

Today the Hebrew Scouts Movement has around 100,000 members from the ages of 9 to 18 years old in about 230 scout tribes; it is the largest youth movement in Israel.

The movement is divided into 15 regional leaderships operating relatively autonomously, but subject to the provisions and procedures of the movement. The "Tzabar" Scouts for Israeli children living abroad, which operates in the United States, Canada, Australia, Hong Kong, Netherlands, United Kingdom, Portugal, Spain, Switzerland, Germany, Cyprus, Greece and the former Soviet Union, have separate managements and activities, but the same values and principles.

Regions of the Hebrew Scouts Movement in Israel:

- Tzafon region (North)
- Haifa region
- HaTzuk region
- hahoresh region
- HaShahar region
- Dror region
- Menashe region
- Dan region
- Ramat-Gan region
- Tel Aviv-Yafo region
- Ayalon region
- HaHof region
- Jerusalem region
- Yehuda region
- Sorek region
- Darom region (South)

Some of the regions incorporate a large area (the South region – from Kiryat Gat to Yeruham) and some regions include only one big city (the Tel-Aviv-Yafo region). In addition to the regions there are also various segments of scout tribes, such as the Sea Scouts and Adat HaTzofim, a religious division which was once a separate organization.

Every region has both professionals and volunteers working for it, and has offices, vehicles, equipment, financial plan, events, camps, trips and more.

== Tzofim Tzabar Olami ==
Tzofim Tzabar is the name for the Hebrew Scouts regions located outside Israel, in the United States, Canada, Australia, Hong Kong, Netherlands, United Kingdom and the former Soviet Union. It aims to foster Zionism and love of Israel among Israelis who live in these countries. Activities are held in Hebrew, and the members work in similar settings to the Scouts in Israel, and pass the rest of courses and seminars on topics such as identity and culture. Under the existing backlog Scouts 56 tribes that meet on a weekly basis. Tzabar is an active educational framework for Israelis to strengthen Jewish identity and Israeli-Zionist, maintaining contact with the Israeli-Zionist culture and the State of Israel, and providing tools for members of the graduating addressing the issue of their return.

== Age groups ==
Each age group has its own name in the Hebrew Scouts movement. During the year there is a celebration in which members of every age-group pass a test according to their age, and after passing the test members are given the new rank they have earned (rank is a scout-scarf in different colors).

Ages	Name	Scarf Colors
9–10	Ofarim – עופרים	Yellow
10–11	Nachshonim – נחשונים	Yellow+Blue
11–12	Meshotetim – משוטטים	Blue
12–13	Hotrim – חותרים	Orange
13–14	Mavtichim – מבטיחים	Orange+Green
14–15	Solelim – סוללים	Green
15–16	Madrichim – מדריכים	Green+White*
16–17	Bonim – בונים	Green+White*
17–18	Magshimim – מגשימים	Green+Gray*

*From the age of 15–18 years, the scout-scarf changes according to the member's role in the scout tribe.

== Organizational structure ==
Organizationally, it is possible to divide the Hebrew Scouts Movement in the following way:

- The National Leadership is the head of the Hebrew Scouts Movement in Israel. The chairman of the national leadership is also the chairman of the Hebrew Scouts Movement in Israel. As of this period, it is Eli Ben-Yosef.
- On the movement management in charge the Secretary-General.
- Departments and Divisions:
  - Department of Finance
  - Department of Marketing and Public Relations
  - Education Division
    - All scout regions in Israel
    - Program Department
      - Israel Scouts Website
      - Israel National Scouting Center
      - Department for Special Needs
    - Department for Immigrant Absorption
    - Department of "the next way" – which is responsible for the formulation and management of tens of different scouting volunteer programs for scouts aged 18 to 19 years old, and some special army-programs for scouts who continue being scouts during their compulsory army service.
    - Safety Department
    - Department for Youth at Risk
    - Sea Scouts Sector
    - Religious Scouts Sector
  - Tzofim Tzabar Olami
    - Department of International Relations
      - The Israel Scouts delegation to North America
      - The Friendship Caravan
      - The Poland Delegation
      - International Programs in Israel
      - International Delegations
    - Garin Tzabar
    - Tzabar Scouts (Israel Scouts Overseas)
  - Human Resources Department
  - Operations and Procurement Department
    - Israel Scouts Ranch
  - Resource Development Department

== Religious Scouts division ==
"Adat HaTzofim" or "Religious Scouts" is a religious division of 12 Scout tribes in the Hebrew Scouts Movement in Israel. Shevet Masuot in Jerusalem is the largest and oldest tribe in this division. It was founded in 1945, and has operated continuously since then.

The purpose of the Religious Scouts is to allow all young Scouts to belong to the Scout Movement regardless of origin, political views, or spiritual views, while emphasizing the bridge between religious and secular youth. "Adat HaTzofim" educates and works with the same values of the Scouts movement, but also uses the teachings of the bible of Israel and the Jewish religion.

== Israel Scouts Ranch ==
The Israeli Scouts Ranch is a camping and outdoor education facility located in the Galilee region of Israel. It is owned and operated by the Hebrew Scouts movement, and serves as a hub for Scout activities and events in the country.

The Israeli Scouts Ranch covers a large area and includes a variety of facilities and amenities, including cabins, tents, a dining hall, and classrooms. The ranch is also home to a number of educational programs and activities, including wilderness survival skills, environmental education, and leadership development.

The Israeli Scouts Ranch is a popular destination for Scout groups from all over Israel, and is often used for Scout camps, training programs, and other Scout events. It is also open to the public for day use and rental for events and activities.

Overall, the Israeli Scouts Ranch is an important part of the Scout movement in Israel, providing a place for Scouts to learn new skills, develop leadership abilities, and experience the outdoors. It is a valuable resource for Scout groups from around the country.

== Notable alumni ==
=== Politics and government ===
- Benjamin Netanyahu
- Merav Michaeli
- Asaf Zamir
- Aryeh Eldad
- Ofer Berkovich
- Daniel Friedmann
- Yoav Gallant
- Zvi Gendelman
- Ada Feinberg-Sireni
- Miki Haimovich
- Ronen Hoffman

=== Academia ===
- Rachel Elior
- Ruth Gavison
- Idit Keidar

=== Music, literature and arts ===
- Din Din Aviv
- Doron Medalie
- Gidi Gov
- Amos Oz
- Shlomo Artzi
- Galila Ron-Feder Amit
- Dudu Faruk
- Ayelet Zurer

=== Media ===
- Michael Karpin
- Tamar Ish-Shalom
- Moti Kirschenbaum
- Lucy Ayub

=== Military and security ===
- Aviv Kochavi
- Herzi HaLevi
- Ghassan Alian
- Giora Romm

=== Business ===
- Shimon Mizrachi

== See also ==
- Israel Boy and Girl Scouts Federation
