= Camp Tel Yehudah =

Jewish summer camp in Barryville, New York, US

- Barryville, New York

Information
- Established: 1948
- Superintendent: David Weinstein
- Campus size: 150 acres; 60.7 ha
- Website: www.telyehudah.org

Deer in the early morning at Camp Tel Yehudah

Camp Tel Yehudah is the official national teen leadership camp of Young Judaea, a Zionist youth movement in North America. It is located in Barryville, New York, and provides immersive, summer experiences for Jewish teenagers from ages 13–17 (going into high school up until college). It is located on the banks of the Delaware River.

== Camp organization ==
There are two sections of the camp, Aleph and Bet. Aleph is a bit older with cozy bunks (most that have bathrooms but not showers), and many apple trees.

Tel Yehudah used to have four sessions: Regular (now called Alumim) - where first-time campers learned about Jewish history. Ulpan - where campers learned Hebrew through songs, Israeli folk dances, and conversation, Machon - leadership training, and Machoneh Avodah (affectionately called M.A.), during which teens lived in the tents, prepared their own meals, grew vegetables, and milked cows. M.A. was meant to simulate life on a kibbutz in order to prepare graduates who would be making aliyah and living on Kibbutzim around Israel. Later, M.A. was changed to "Machaneh Hachshara" (M.H.).

The age groups are Alumim (rising 9th graders who learn about general Jewish and Zionist history), Yachad (rising 10th graders who take part in programs centered on the importance of togetherness and community), and Hadracha (rising 11th graders who learn how to be successful leaders). Each group has different trips: Alumim goes to Niagara Falls, Yachad has Special Interest Week- campers (chanichim) choose to go biking, backpacking, kayaking, or to New York City, where they take part in social action or photography, and Hadracha goes to Washington, D.C. for a "Day on the Hill." where they advocate for modern issues of their choosing.

Seniors who will be graduating from high school can apply to work at the camp in support roles. There are positions such as babysitters, kitchen help, logistics and office staff.

They say the ha-motzi before eating meals, and sing the Birkat Hamazon afterward. They often sing songs out of the Young Judaea shiron book of Jewish songs and prayers- and dance around the Hadar Ochel (dining hall).

The Hadar Ochel at TY, with campers and staff walking around after lunch.

The "Beit Ha'am", a large wooden building at the heart of the Aleph section, is where plays, dances, and many major activities happen at the camp. The Israeli singer David Broza played on a stage outside the Beit ha'Am during a reunion event at the camp in 2023.

== Notable events ==
In 2006, after days of rain, a devastating flood swept across Camp Tel Yehudah and the surrounding areas. The Delaware River overflowed into the Bet section of the camp. The campers were evacuated to a nearby shelter. The 10th anniversary of the flood was commemorated in the summer of 2016 during an insurance company themed maccabiah. The water va'ad represented the company that now provides Tel Yehudah's flood insurance.

In 2008, a delegation from Young Judaea's sister movement, the Federation of Zionist Youth (FZY) in the United Kingdom, attended Camp Tel Yehudah's second session. This group, which was called Hanhaga, consisted of thirty 16- to 17-year-olds from across the Atlantic Ocean.

In 2017, the camp was given a torah scroll.

== See also ==
- Machon
