= Zvi Nishri =

Israeli physical education teacher (1878–1973)

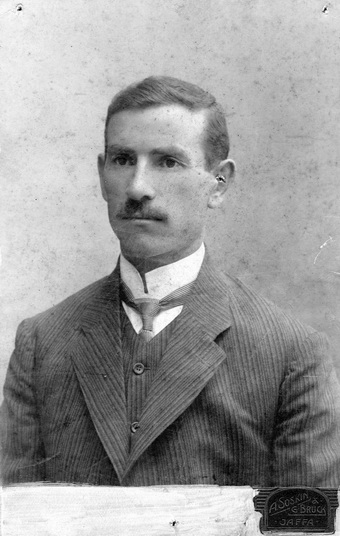

Personal information
- Native name: צבי נשרי
- Nationality: Russian-born Palestinian/Israeli
- Born: January 4, 1878 Russia
- Died: July 22, 1973 (aged 95)

Zvi Nishri (Hebrew: צבי נשרי; January 4, 1878 – July 22, 1973) was a pioneer in modern physical education in British Mandate for Palestine and later, Israel.

== Biography ==
Zvi Orloff (later Nishri) was born to a Jewish family in Russia, where he served as a soldier. His sister was the sculptor, Chana Orloff. Raful Eitan was a nephew.

He immigrated to Palestine in 1903. He initially worked as a laborer, in Petah Tikva.

== Physical education career ==
In 1906 he became involved in physical education. In 1908, he started to teach physical education, and by 1912, he was involved in training teachers on the subject. In 1911, he introduced Scandinavian gymnastics to Palestine. He taught at the Herzliya High School for 40 years.

Nishri authored the first physical education publications in Hebrew, and established the first physical education and sports terminology in Hebrew. In 1913, he began a prolific career as an author, writing publications on gymnastics, football, and other physical education topics.

Nishri was a founder in Palestine of the Maccabi movement, which he coached in gymnastics, and of the Hebrew Scout Movement.

== Awards and recognition ==
Nishri was inducted as a member of the International Jewish Sports Hall of Fame in 1981. The Wingate Institute established a prize in his honor. In addition, the Wingate Institute's Terner Pedagogical Centre contains the Zvi Nishri Archives.

== Published works ==
- Nishri Zvi, (Heb.) A Summary of the Physical Education History, Tel Aviv: The Ministry for Education and Culture, The Department for Physical Training, 1953

== See also ==
- Sports in Israel
- Education in Israel
