= Orly Weinerman =

Israeli actress, model and singer (born 1971)

- אורלי ויינרמן
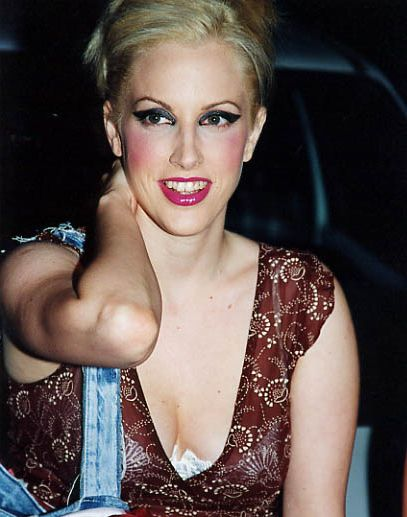
- Born: 21 June 1971 (age 55); Tel Aviv, Israel
- Partner: Saif al-Islam Gaddafi (2005–2026)
- Modeling information
- Hair color: Blonde
- Eye color: Blue

Orly Weinerman (Hebrew: אורלי ויינרמן; born 21 June 1971) is an Israeli actress, model and singer.

Weinerman was a member of the cast of Shemesh, an Israeli situation comedy. After Shemesh, Weinerman moved to London where she attempted to make a career in modelling and advance her acting career. Returning to Israel, Weinerman appeared at the Beauty City beauty fair.

In 2006, the German newspaper Der Spiegel, the Spanish newspaper La Voz de Galicia and the AP Archive Interview reported that Weinerman was romantically linked to Saif al-Islam Gaddafi, son of the Libyan leader Muammar Gaddafi. Weinerman initially publicly denied having any contact with Saif al-Islam. In 2012, she said that she considered marriage with Saif Gaddafi and that "everything should be done" to save him from death.

== Filmography ==
Weinerman has acted in the following Israeli TV series:

- 1989 Ha-Hofesh Ha'Acharon
- 1997 Florentine
- 1997 to 2003 Shemesh
- 1998 to 1999 Only in Israel (season 2)
- 1998 Parpar Layla

Additionally, she has appeared as herself in the following Israeli TV series:

- 1999 Parpar Layla
- 2004 Mishpachat Kamichli
