= Shemesh (TV series) =

- שמש
- Genre: Sitcom
- Created by: Zvika Hadar
- Written by: Assaf Ashtar, Ruby Duenyas
- Theme music composer: Teapacks
- Opening theme: "Eize Olam" by Teapacks
- Country of origin: Israel
- Original language: Hebrew
- No. of seasons: 6
- No. of episodes: 142

Production
- Running time: 24 minutes

Original release
- Network: Channel 2 (Keshet)
- Release: December 25, 1997 – June 22, 2004

Related
- Ha-Comedy Store

Shemesh is an Israeli television sitcom that aired for 6 seasons on Channel 2 from 1997 to 2004. It was produced by Teddy Productions.

The show was successful in its original run, becoming an exclusive show on the satellite provider yes by Season 4. It was Israel's second successful sitcom, following Krovim Krovim.

== Premise ==
The series follows Nahum Shemesh, a young provincial man from the southern Israeli city of Beersheba who moves to central Tel Aviv-Yafo where he opens a small restaurant, "The Empire of the Sun" (a play on the character's name, as Shemesh means sun in Hebrew, as well as a reference the 1987 Steven Spielberg film of the same name). Throughout the series, Shemesh, along with his friends and neighbors, navigate personal and professional challenges in their quests for success. The series explores the cultural tensions between different facets of Jewish-Israeli society, with the provincial Shemesh clashing with the urbanites of Tel Aviv-Yafo and their "northern" perspectives. Alongside this, the series humorously highlights stereotypes associated with various Jewish subethnicities, depicting characters that reflect common (and often exaggerated) views—such as the image of Romanian Jews as frugal misers, Georgian Jews as lacking intelligence, and Yemenite Jews as "primitive."

The episodes of the show often follow absurd premises. For example, in one episode, Shemesh buys Bar a video game where when players lose in the game, time in real life reverses. In another instance, Sassi gets recruited by the Shin Bet.

In addition to drawing inspiration from 1990s American sitcoms, such as Married... with Children and Seinfeld, the series is heavily influenced by the real-life story of its lead actor, Zvika Hadar. At the time, Hadar was a rising star who had moved to Tel Aviv-Yafo and found success after growing up in Beersheba. The main character is an exaggerated, fictionalized version of Hadar, sharing several traits with the actor—including a deep passion for the football team Hapoel Be'er Sheva.

== Characters ==
=== Main characters ===
- Nachum Shemesh (Zvika Hadar): A Romanian Jew from Beersheba who moved to Tel Aviv-Yafo to open a restaurant. An avid fan of the football club Hapoel Be'er Sheva, as well as the secret son of Paul Newman, Shemesh works to make Empire of the Sun successful and navigate a rocky love life. He married Etti in Season 6. In the series finale, he briefly dies and goes to heaven, only to be sent back to Earth upon the discovery that his time was not up. Known for his sarcasm and cynicism, Shemesh often directs his dry humor toward his employees.
- Esther 'Etti' Hillel (Galit Giat): A Yemenite Jewish waitress at Empire of the Sun. Etti is Shemesh's main love interest, and the two marry at the start of Season 6. Originally from Lod, Etti moved to Tel Aviv-Yafo with dreams of becoming a famous actress. Throughout the series, she continues to pursue this goal. During that season, she briefly finds success as an actress on a soap opera, only for her show to be canceled when the network goes bankrupt.
- Sasson "Sassi" Feldman-Shvilly/Siton (Zvulun Moshiashvili): Empire of the Sun's cook and Shemesh's personal assistant. A Georgian Jew from Ness Ziona, Sassi is often ridiculed—primarily by Shemesh, but also by Tenzer—for his short stature and perceived lack of intelligence. Despite his naïveté and dimwitted nature caused by a hypnosis trick gone awry, Sassi is a loyal friend and an exceptionally talented chef. Midway through the series, it is revealed he is the long-lost son of the Georgian foreign minister (played by Moshiasvhili's real-life father, Mordechai Moshiasvhili). In Season 4, Sassi enters a polyamorous marriage with Ogen and Hemmi.
- Ogen Siton (Orly Weinerman): Ogen is a stereotypical "dumb blonde". Ogen is a close friend and love interest of Sassi. She has a brother named Oneg, who appears once in Season 2. In Season 4, it is revealed that her apparent lack of intelligence was actually a persona created by the Mossad. In the same season, she enters a polyamorous marriage with Sassi and Hemmi.
- Yshayahu Tenzer (Gadi Rabinovich): A lawyer who lives above Empire of the Sun with a penchant for chaos and a love of pastrami sandwiches. Known for his mean-spirited and sometimes sadistic nature, he is frequently called a "manyak" (מניאק), Israeli slang for someone unpleasant or annoying, or an immoral or cruel person. Despite his often friendly but strained relationship with Shemesh, which at times borders on rivalry, Tenzer frequently helps him avoid bankruptcy and legal trouble. His character name, Tenzer, is inspired by a character from Shmuel Yosef Agnon's short story "Different Faces." In the series finale, he marries an equally sadistic traffic officer.
- Bar Sela (Eliad Nachum): A child who Shemesh's best friend and a frequent visitor at Empire of the Sun, often spending time there due to implied neglect from his mother. Sharing the experience of growing up without a father, Bar and Shemesh develop a close bond, with Shemesh acting as a father figure who watches over Bar and imparts his street wisdom. Bar becomes a b'nai mitzvah in the series finale.

=== Supporting characters ===
Each season introduced at least one new character to the main cast. These characters typically had their own story arcs and left before the season's end. Occasionally, however, a character proved popular or integral enough to stay on for a longer period.

- Rakefet Sela (Dana Shrier): Bar's often neglectful mother, a French-Jewish spiritual guru. In Season 1, she shares a friendly rivalry with Shemesh and has a close friendship with Etti. After the first season, her character appears only occasionally, with sporadic mentions after Season 3 and a single appearance in Season 4 until the series finale.
- Mano Bari (Charlie Buzaglo): A philosophy student who moves to Israel from Italy. In Season 2, he develops a romantic relationship with Etti. It's later revealed that Mano is Bar's biological father, the result of a brief affair with Rakefet in Italy. At the end of Season 3, Mano meets Sivan, whom he eventually marries.
- Sivan (Dorit Bar Or): A former classmate and rival of Etti who starts dating Shemesh in Season 3 and later becomes engaged to him. She is portrayed as mean, bossy, and a gold digger, showing little respect for Shemesh or his down-to-earth values. Eventually, the wedding plans fall apart, and she tries to escape with all the guests' gift checks. At the end of Season 3, she meets Mano Bari, whom she later marries—a fact only revealed in the series finale.
- Hemmi Alze-Siton (Yehezkel Lazarov): Hemmi is a copywriter and television commercial director, embodying the lifestyle of a yuppie striving for success in the Tel Aviv-Yafo's social scene. Introduced in Season 4, he becomes a romantic rival to Sassi for Ogen's affections. The rivalry is resolved when Hemmi, Sassi, and Ogen enter a polyamorous marriage, structured after Channel 2's partnership model. While smarter than his spouses, Hemmi is still portrayed as somewhat dim-witted. He vanishes from the series after the birth of their child, Yakubu—who is implied to have been conceived from an affair due to his dark skin tone—and only reappears in the series finale, where he inadvertently causes Shemesh's temporary death.
- Marcus Emek (Aryeh Moskona): Originally introduced in Season 2 as a timid career consultant at Tel Aviv University, he reappears in Season 4 as a shrewd businessman. Contacted by Shemesh to help save his struggling restaurant, Marcus becomes the representative of the mysterious lessees known only as "the Koreans." He is overly touchy and socially oblivious but displays a cunning and intelligent nature throughout the season. Despite this, he is frequently ridiculed by the restaurant staff. Marcus leaves the show when Shemesh intentionally violates the terms of his lease with the Koreans, forcing him out. His name, "Marcus Emek," is a pun: "cus emek" is Hebrew slang meaning "god damn it" and with the prefix "Mar" (meaning "mister" or "bitter"), his name can be interpreted as "Mr. God Damn It" or "Bitter Vagina Valley" ("cus" being slang for vagina and "emek" meaning valley).
- Zoe (Moran Stavitzki): Zoe is a young and hip club-goer who moves into the building at the start of Season 5. She embodies the younger, vibrant side of Tel Aviv-Yafo 's nightlife scene, often seen partying, drinking, and experimenting with drugs—presenting a stark contrast to the older main cast. Most of the characters (aside from Bar) struggle to understand her clubber slang or her taste in music, with Shemesh once dismissively calling it "electronic noise."
- Ravit Hillel (Sharon Durani): Etti's younger sister who temporarily moves in with Etti and Shemesh in Season 6. She is portrayed as carefree, irresponsible, and flirtatious, having just returned from an extended trip to India. Ravit frequently indulges in hedonistic pursuits, choosing fun over planning for the future. Later in the season, she pretends to stalk Etti as a publicity stunt to boost her sister's career before eventually returning to India.
