= Hapoel Rishon LeZion =

Hapoel Rishon LeZion is an Hapoel sports club in the city of Rishon LeZion, Israel. it may refer to:

- Hapoel Rishon LeZion F.C., the city association football club
- Hapoel Rishon LeZion (handball), the city handball club
