= AJ6 =

AJ6 was a Jewish organisation open to all Jews in school years 11-13 in the UK. It was founded in 1977. AJ6 was peer-led and had its own constitution. Until 2007, It ran both a membership side and a services side, the latter covering schools and campus. However, in October 2007, AJ6 handed over the services part of the organisation to the UJIA. In July 2009, AJ6 ceased to exist in its previous form, teaming up with UJIA-JAMS to deliver activities through both mainstream and Jewish schools. In September 2023 the delivery of provision for Jewish students in mainstream schools (JAMS) and Jewish 6th form provision.

== Activities ==
Following the closure of AJ6 in 2009, a new programme of activities such as campus visits, university mentors, campus skills training, advocacy sessions and university activist training is being developed. These new activities will be planned and run by professional youth workers, with input and assistance from experienced students and from sixtform participants. The programmes will be run with a similar ethos as AJ6 always had: cross-communal participation, an emphasis on peer leadership and an inclusive and supportive atmosphere for debate.

== History ==
AJ6's vision was of an educated and tolerant Jewish community, responsible for one another, excited and enriched by its Judaism and inspired by its younger members. Its mission was to educate and develop Jewish fifth- and sixth-formers, enabling them to shape Jewish life at school, on campus and in the wider community.

AJ6 held regional meetings, where Jews aged 15–18 met with each other to socialize, discuss issues relevant to their lives and talk about future events.

In 2005 at AJ6's national conference, Shlomi, a small town on the northern Israeli border was made a region, making AJ6 an international movement. AJ6 had strong connections with Shlomi and invited young people over for conference, as well as giving them the opportunity to participate in AJ6's annual Israel and Europe tours in the summer. Conference 2006 saw the election of Shlomi's first regional chair, Doron Gerlitz. In addition to this, AJ6 Israel Tour Participants stayed in Shlomi with young Israelis for 2 days as part of the mifgashim, or encounters in order to educate AJ6 members about life in Israel.

As well as regional activities AJ6 ran four major national events a year: National Weekends in October, April and July and a five-day Conference in December. There were also at least two national "balls" each year: the Spring Ball and the summer Boat Ball.

Like many other Jewish youth movements, AJ6 ran summer tours to Israel and Europe. In 2006, AJ6 became the first movement to include Paris on its Europe tour and in 2007 AJ6 was the first movement to run a 2 week Israel tour.

AJ6 also had its own gap year programme, AJ6 Yearscheme - Shnat Hachshorah. Each year, about half a dozen participants from the UK and several from Shlomi spent ten months in Israel.
