= Ars (slang) =

Derogatory term for an Israeli man of a macho subculture

Ars (Hebrew: ערס `ars), or Arsim (the plural in Hebrew) is an Israeli subculture, and a slang term in Hebrew. Originally used as an ethnic slur referring to Mizrahi Jews, the term has evolved and is now more broadly applied to describe anyone part of a perceived thuggish subculture of machismo. An ars is often depicted as loud and brash. The stereotype of an ars typically includes being crude, using vulgar language, hanging out with criminal types, seeking fights, and wearing flashy clothing (e.g. tank tops) and jewelry. The term derives from the Arabic word for pimp. Those who attempt to be an ars but are perceived as lacking the confidence of a typical ars are referred to by the slang term "Ars TzaAtzua" (Toy ars).

== Etymology ==
The term derives its origin from the Arabic word Ars (Arabic: عرص, ʿarṣ), which means "shepherd" and is used colloquially to refer to pimps (who "shepherd" prostitutes). The term has no connection to the British English slang word arse.

== History ==
While ars originated as a derogatory term for Mizrahim, it is also used for members of other ethnicities in Israeli society, such as Russian-speaking immigrants or young men of Ethiopian origin.

In 2013, an Israeli labor court ruled that a prospective employer discriminated against a Mizrahi applicant by calling him an ars. This case set the precedent for recognizing the term ars as a racial epithet.

In 2014, a documentary series called Arsim v’Frekhot (frekha is a feminine equivalent epithet aimed at Mizrahi women) was broadcast on Israeli television. The series examines the history of discrimination against Mizrahim.

The mannerisms associated with pimps in the early days of the State of Israel, which formed the basis of the stereotypical ars: lack of education, associating with criminals, being prone to violence, hailing from low class neighborhoods, dressing in loud clothing, wearing gold chain necklaces or bracelets and using vulgar speech. Related terms used by the Ashkenazi majority were "pushtak" (vacuous) and "tchakh-chakh" (riffraff).

Sometimes the word ars is "feminized" by adding a feminine suffix (arsit), although it is not commonly used for women. The word frekha is the closest feminine epithet that is applied to Mizrahi women. A "frekha" is the implied partner, neighbor, or relative of the ars, but the characteristics ascribed to her are different – the frekha is low-class, dresses gaudily, wears too much makeup, has long and brightly colored nails; she is flighty, shallow, a slave to fashion, and uneducated.

Dudu Faruk is a comedic character and musician based on the "ars" stereotype. His songs include "Arak Arak Arak" and "Tik Tok".

== See also ==
- Maroco sakin
- Jojo Khalastra
- Chav
- Gopnik
- Guido (slang)
- Greaser
