= Eyal Doron =

- אייל דורון
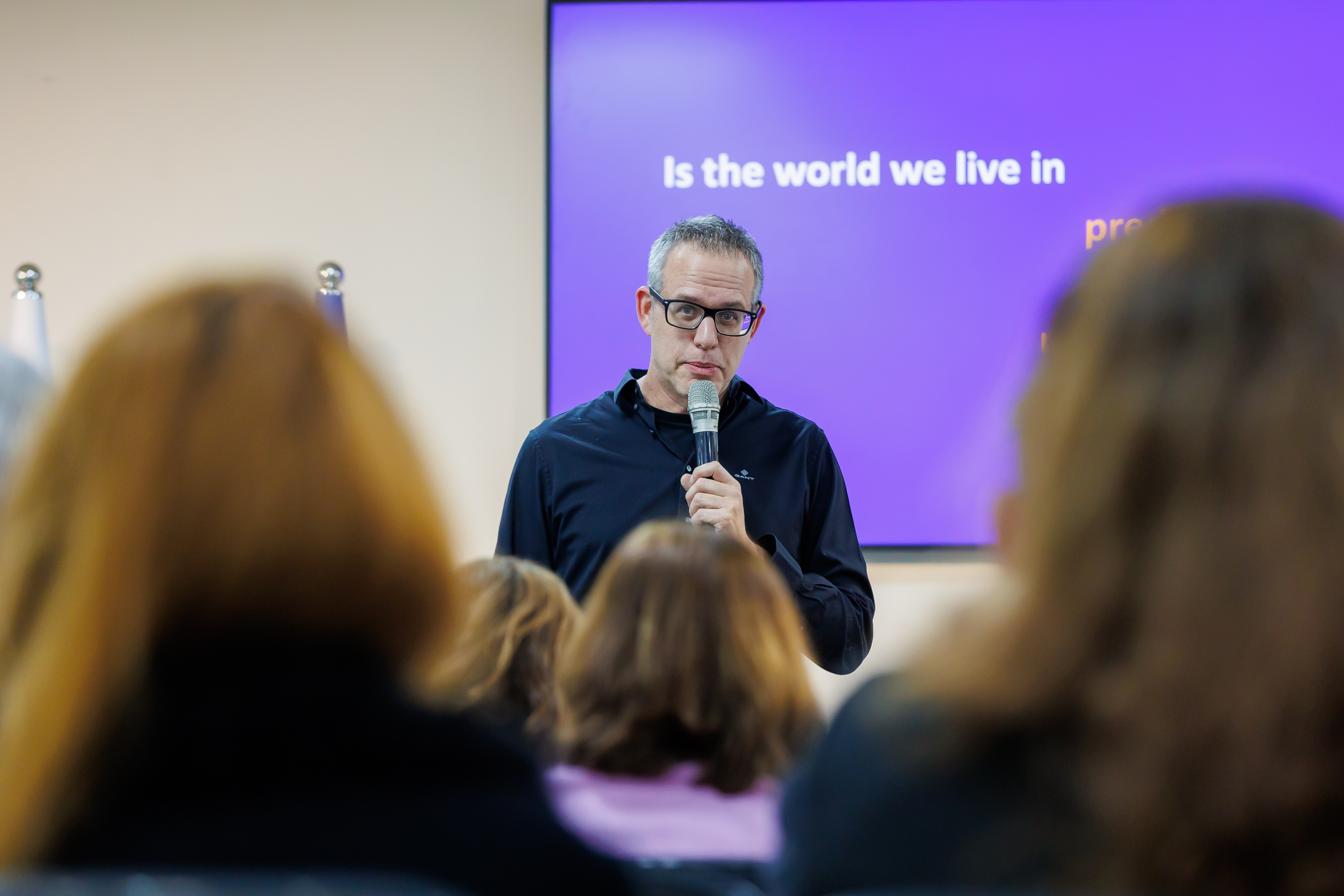
- Education: Tel Aviv University; University of Haifa
- Website: www.eyaldoron.co.il

Eyal Doron (Hebrew: אייל דורון) is a lecturer and researcher in the field of creative thinking, author, executive coach and organizational consultant in Israel and worldwide, and head of the executive management program at the Reichman University. Formerly a TV and theater creator. In recent years Doron has been engaged in the field of creative education and the challenges of the new world of work in the technological age with the rise of artificial intelligence.

Since 2010 Doron has advised executives and organizations in processes that nurture creative leadership abilities and in solving complex problems. Doron has worked with large companies such as Google Israel, playtika, innoviz, government ministries, Maccabi Health Services, Teva and large banks in Israel.

== Biography ==
Doron was a screenwriter, content editor and playwright on television and in theater. In 2008 he created the comic-dramatic series "I Didn't Promise You" which aired on Yes and the documentary series "On Life and Death" which aired on Channel 10.

Since 2014 he has lectured at the School of Psychology at Reichman University and runs an executive training program at the university's School of Management.

== Education ==
Doron studied at the School of Theater Studies at Tel Aviv University and completed his doctorate in 2005, under the supervision of Prof. Shimon Levy. His doctoral thesis was: "Catharsis in Theater and Television – The Experience of Watching Television and Its Connection to the Theater-Going Experience"

He completed a post-doctorate at the School of Expressive Therapies at the University of Haifa under the supervision of Prof. Rachel Lev-Wiesel and Prof. Mario Mikulincer, in which he researched creativity among children and youth. As a result, he founded the SEISEI method for developing creative thinking, which was recognized as one of the 100 most innovative educational methods in the world for 2019 by the Finnish organization HundrED, a non-profit organization promoting innovation in education. The method has been scientifically tested.

== Books ==
- "Life in an amusement park", 2014, Keter Publishing. The book surveys the topics he researched and examines self-actualization in the 21st century.
- "Reinventing: Parenting and Education in the 21st Century", 2019. presenting a model for creative parenting adapted to educating children in a changing world.
- "People to Learn From: Eight life changing lessons", 2023. In the book, Doron gives "courses" on eight figures including: Reid Hoffman, Jacinda Ardern, Mister Beast, Carl Honoré, Oprah Winfrey and more.

== On television and in theater ==
=== On television ===
In 2008 he created the comedic-dramatic series "I Didn't Promise You" which aired on yes. Later that year he created the documentary series "On Life and Death" which aired on Channel 10.

Between 2009 and 2014 he created for Keshet 12 three seasons of "How to Be Happy in Six Lessons", in which he served as editor-in-chief, writer and director.

In 2017 he appeared in the program "Tzvika and Eyal Make a School", which focuses on the role of parents vis-à-vis the education system, together with Tzvika Hadar for Channel 13

In 2017 he created two episodes of "The System" with Mickey Haimovich on the subjects of "Vanishing Professions" and "Rethinking Computer Education"

In 2018 he created the film "Homework Revolution" for Channel 13

As part of Science Night in 2018, he led together with the Ministry of Science and Technology "Israel's Great Happiness Experiment"

=== In theater ===
Between 2001 and 2005 he created the play "Let's Not Talk About It" which he wrote and directed.

In 2005 he created "Have They Ever Made a Movie About You?" which premiered at the Beit Lessin Theater. And that same year he created a play based on Brecht's "The Informer" which was performed as part of the Short Theater Festival at Tzavta.

Over the years he also created the play "The Wheat Sea", the satirical play "Sea. Land. Sea." and the comedy "Relationship Theory" which was performed in collaboration between the Tzavta and Tel Aviv Theatre Group theaters.

== Family ==
Doron is married with two children, Itamar and Alona.
