= Zvi Gendelman =

Israeli politician

- צבי גנדלמן
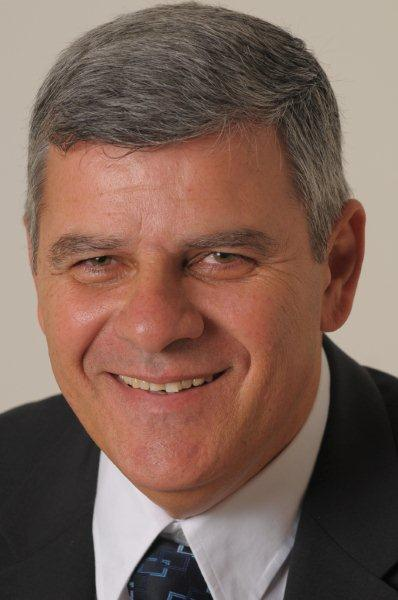
- Born: September 12, 1956 (age 70); Tiberias, Israel
- Military career
- Allegiance: Israel Defense Forces
- Service years: 1974–2007
- Rank: Tat aluf
- Commands: 7th Armored Brigade, 460th Brigade, 319th Division, 36th Division and Military attaché in the United Kingdom, Ireland and Finland
- Conflicts: 1982 Lebanon War; South Lebanon conflict (1985–2000); First Intifada; Second Intifada
- Other work: Chairman of Sha'ar Menashe association, CEO of Cinema City Rishon LeZion, mayor of Hadera

Zvi "Zvika" Gendelman (Hebrew: צבי "צביקה" גנדלמן; born September 12, 1956) is an Israeli politician who is the current mayor of Hadera. He is also a former Brigadier-general in the Israel Defense Forces. A member of a centrist independent political group, Gendelman was elected in the 2013 municipal elections, defeating then-Mayor Chaim Avitan. He was re-elected in 2018.

== Biography ==
Zvi Gendelman was born in Tiberias, Israel on September 12, 1956. At the age of 7, his family relocated to Hadera, where he grew up and was educated.

He enlisted in the IDF naval special forces unit of the Israeli Navy, Shayetet 13. After an injury, he moved to the Armored Corps, where he was trained as a fighter and in a tank commander's course. Subsequently he completed an Officers Course and was a tank commander. In Operation Litani (1978) Gendelman, as a company commander, led the forces in the occupation of the town Bint Jbeil. During the Lebanon War he was the brigade operations officer. At the end of the war he became 7th Armored Brigade officer and eventually the regiment commander. Gendelman served as commander of 460th Brigade and in 1996 was promoted to brigadier general, and was the bang division commander, and the commander of the company and battalion commanders course. In 1999, he was appointed as a commander of the 36th Division, having served in that capacity for two years.

In October 2000, the 2000 Hezbollah cross-border raid occurred with kidnapping of Israeli soldiers. Shortly after the event, Gendelman stood alone at a press conference and took over responsibility for the incident. Following the event, he wrote Chief of Staff Shaul Mofaz a letter of resignation. The resignation was not accepted. Peled committee, which investigated the circumstances of the case, did not receive command decisions. Chief of Staff Shaul Mofaz has decided to write a comment command. A Channel 2 investigation sided with Gendelman's lack of guilt. Gendelman continued in his position as commander of the division until May 2001. He then commanded a course for company commanders and battalion commanders.

In 2003 he was appointed as Military attaché in the United Kingdom, Ireland and Finland; a position he held until 2006.

=== Post-retirement ===
In the late of 2008, Gendelman announced his intention to run for mayor of Hadera in the municipal elections, but was defeated by incumbent mayor Chaim Avitan. Later on, he was in the business market, dealing with various of innovations and management of projects. In 2013, Gendelman run again for office in the municipal elections, beating then-incumbent Mayor from the Likud party, Chaim Avitan.

In October 2018, plagued by an ongoing probe which was launched months earlier, and while leaving his centrist Yesh Atid party to form an independent group called Hadera BeTnufah (Hadera On The Rise), he was re-elected with 41% of the vote.

=== Personal life ===
Gendelman has a master's degree in political science and National Security from Haifa University. He is divorced and has 4 children.
