= List of Arkia destinations =

Destinations of the Israeli airline Arkia

As of September 2023, Arkia operates to the following destinations:

== List ==
Country	City	Airport	Notes	Refs
Albania	Tirana	Tirana International Airport Nënë Tereza		
Armenia	Yerevan	Zvartnots International Airport	Resumes 2 April 2026	
Austria	Vienna	Vienna International Airport		
Azerbaijan	Baku	Heydar Aliyev International Airport		
Bosnia and Herzegovina	Sarajevo	Sarajevo International Airport	Terminated	
Bulgaria	Burgas	Burgas Airport	Terminated	
Bulgaria	Plovdiv	Plovdiv Airport	Terminated	
Bulgaria	Sofia	Vasil Levski Sofia Airport		
Croatia	Dubrovnik	Dubrovnik Airport	Terminated	
Croatia	Zadar	Zadar Airport	Terminated	
Cyprus	Larnaca	Larnaca International Airport		
Cyprus	Paphos	Paphos International Airport		
Czech Republic	Prague	Václav Havel Airport Prague		
Egypt	Sharm El Sheikh	Sharm El Sheikh International Airport	Terminated	
Estonia	Tallinn	Lennart Meri Tallinn Airport	Begins 1 April 2026	
Finland	Rovaniemi	Rovaniemi Airport	Terminated	
France	Grenoble	Alpes–Isère Airport	Terminated	
France	Lyon	Lyon–Saint-Exupéry Airport	Terminated	
France	Paris	Charles de Gaulle Airport		
France	Strasbourg	Strasbourg Airport	Terminated	
Georgia	Batumi	Batumi International Airport	Seasonal	
Georgia	Tbilisi	Tbilisi International Airport		
Germany	Berlin	Berlin Brandenburg Airport	Terminated	
Germany	Munich	Munich Airport		
Greece	Athens	Athens International Airport		
Greece	Corfu	Corfu International Airport	Seasonal charter	
Greece	Heraklion	Heraklion International Airport	Seasonal	
Greece	Kalamata	Kalamata International Airport	Seasonal charter	
Greece	Karpathos	Karpathos Island National Airport	Terminated	
Greece	Kos	Kos International Airport	Terminated	
Greece	Mykonos	Mykonos Airport	Seasonal	
Greece	Preveza/Lefkada	Aktion National Airport	Seasonal	
Greece	Rhodes	Rhodes International Airport	Seasonal	
Greece	Skiathos	Skiathos International Airport	Terminated	
Greece	Thessaloniki	Thessaloniki International Airport		
Greece	Volos	Nea Anchialos National Airport	Terminated	
Hungary	Budapest	Budapest Ferenc Liszt International Airport		
Hungary	Hévíz	Hévíz–Balaton Airport	Terminated	
Iceland	Reykjavík	Keflavík International Airport	Begins 22 June 2027	
India	Goa	Dabolim Airport	Terminated	
India	Goa	Manohar International Airport	Terminated	
India	Kochi	Cochin International Airport	Terminated	
Ireland	Dublin	Dublin Airport	Terminated	
Israel	Eilat	Eilat Airport	Airport closed	
Israel	Eilat	Ramon Airport	Focus city	
Israel	Haifa	Uri Michaeli Haifa International Airport	Terminated	
Israel	Jerusalem	Atarot Airport	Airport closed	
Israel	Tel Aviv	Ben Gurion Airport	Hub	
Israel	Tel Aviv	Sde Dov Airport	Airport closed	
Italy	Bergamo	Orio al Serio International Airport	Terminated	
Italy	Catania	Catania–Fontanarossa Airport	Terminated	
Italy	Milan	Milan Malpensa Airport		
Italy	Naples	Naples International Airport	Terminated	
Italy	Rome	Rome Fiumicino Airport		
Italy	Verona	Verona Villafranca Airport	Seasonal	
Lithuania	Vilnius	Vilnius Čiurlionis International Airport	Seasonal	
Moldova	Chișinău	Chișinău International Airport	Terminated	
Montenegro	Tivat	Tivat Airport	Seasonal	
Morocco	Essaouira	Essaouira-Mogador Airport	Terminated	
Morocco	Marrakesh	Marrakesh Menara Airport	Resumes 4 January 2027	
Netherlands	Amsterdam	Amsterdam Airport Schiphol		
North Macedonia	Ohrid	Ohrid St. Paul the Apostle Airport	Terminated	
Norway	Bergen	Bergen Airport, Flesland	Terminated	
Norway	Longyearbyen	Svalbard Airport	Seasonal charter	
Norway	Oslo	Oslo Airport, Gardermoen	Terminated	
Philippines	Manila	Ninoy Aquino International Airport	Begins 3 January 2027	
Poland	Warsaw	Warsaw Modlin Airport	Terminated	
Portugal	Lisbon	Lisbon Airport		
Romania	Bucharest	Henri Coandă International Airport	Terminated	
Serbia	Belgrade	Belgrade Nikola Tesla Airport		
Seychelles	Mahé	Seychelles International Airport	Seasonal	
Slovakia	Bratislava	Bratislava Airport	Terminated	
Slovakia	Piešťany	Piešťany Airport	Terminated	
Slovakia	Poprad	Poprad-Tatry Airport	Seasonal	
Slovenia	Ljubljana	Ljubljana Jože Pučnik Airport	Terminated	
Spain	Barcelona	Josep Tarradellas Barcelona–El Prat Airport		
Spain	Ibiza	Ibiza Airport	Seasonal	
Spain	Madrid	Madrid–Barajas Airport	Terminated	
Spain	Málaga	Málaga–Costa del Sol Airport		
Sri Lanka	Colombo	Bandaranaike International Airport	Terminated	
Switzerland	Geneva	Geneva Airport		
Switzerland; France; Germany	Basel; Mulhouse; Freiburg	EuroAirport Basel Mulhouse Freiburg		
Tanzania	Zanzibar City	Abeid Amani Karume International Airport	Seasonal charter	
Thailand	Bangkok	Suvarnabhumi Airport		
Thailand	Phuket	Phuket International Airport	Seasonal	
Turkey	Istanbul	Istanbul Airport	Terminated	
Ukraine	Odesa	Odesa International Airport	Terminated	
United Arab Emirates	Dubai	Dubai International Airport		
United Kingdom	London	London Stansted Airport		
United Kingdom	Manchester	Manchester Airport	Terminated	
United States	New York City	John F. Kennedy International Airport		
Vietnam	Hanoi	Noi Bai International Airport		
