= Ovda Airport =

Military airport in Israel

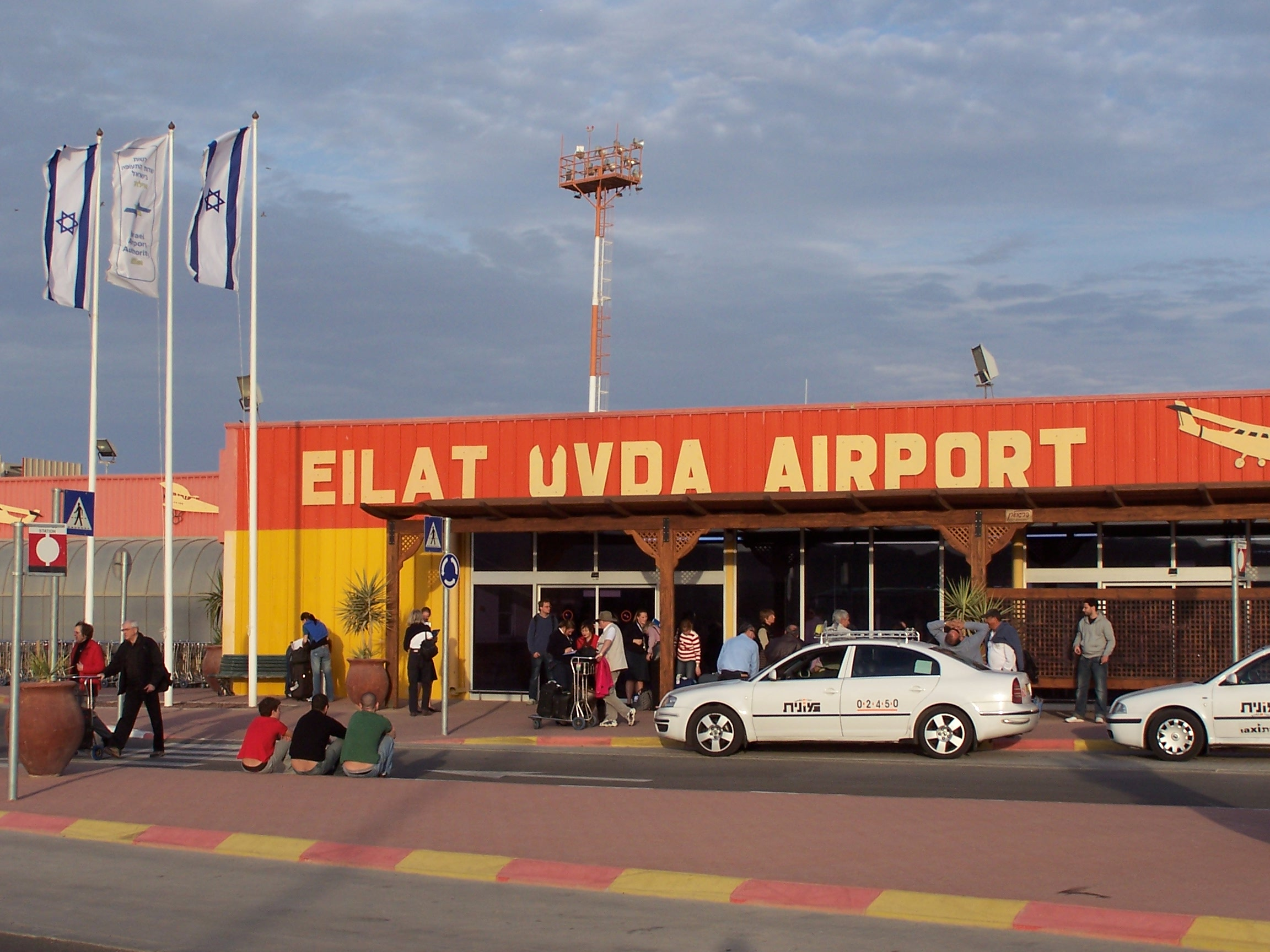
- The first terminal

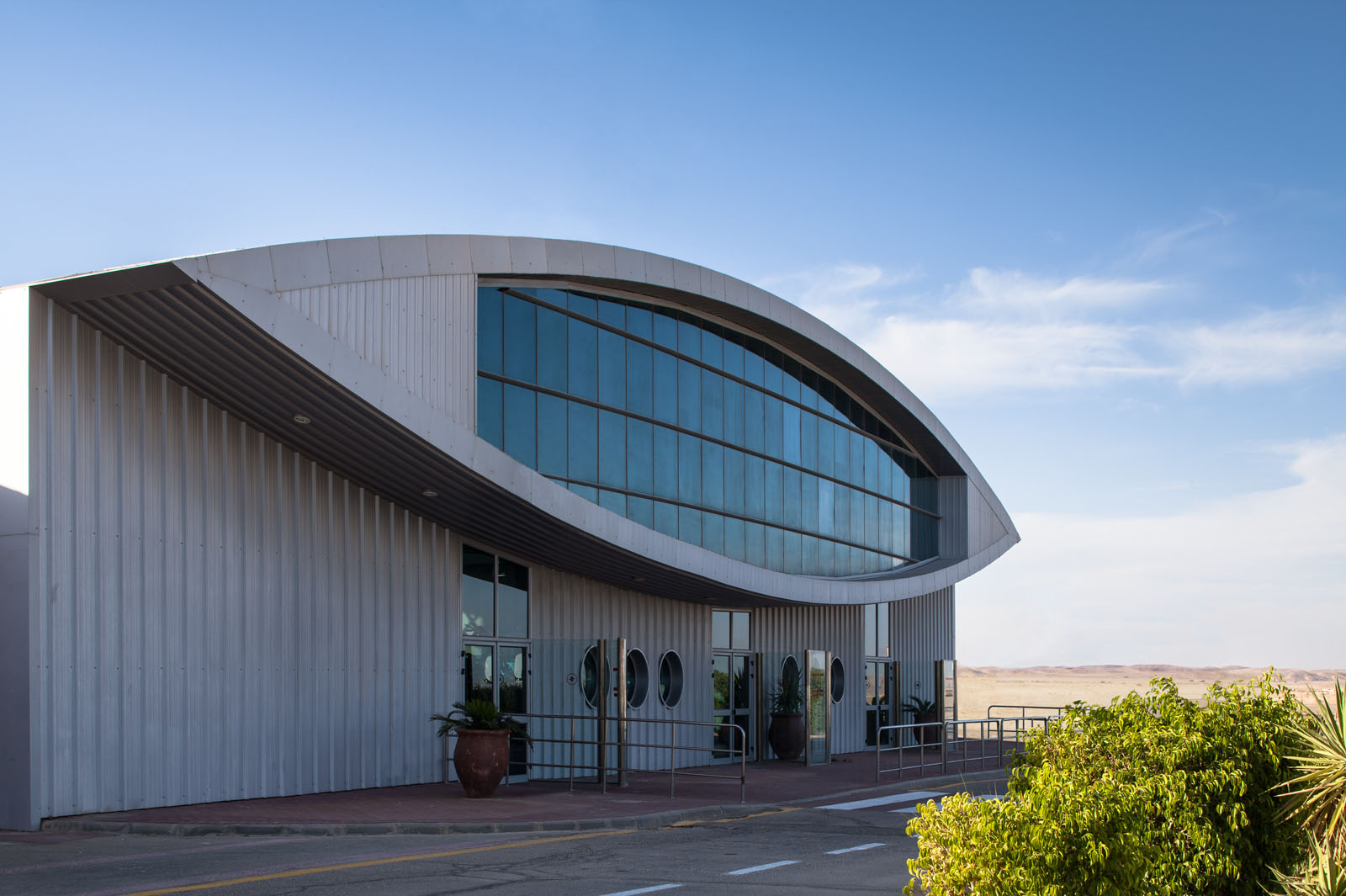
- The new terminal
- IATA: VDA; ICAO: LLOV

Summary
- Airport type: Military
- Operator: Israeli Air Force
- Elevation AMSL: 1,492 ft / 445 m
- Coordinates: 29°56′25″N 34°56′9″E
- Website: http://www.iaa.gov.il

Map

Runways
| Direction | Length | | Surface |
| Direction | ft | m | Surface |
|---|---|---|---|
| 03L/21R | 8,530 | 2,600 | Asphalt |
| 03R/21L | 9,843 | 3,000 | Asphalt |

Statistics (2017)
- Passengers: 209,078
- Source: Israel Airports Authority

Ovda Airport was the former civilian part of the Ovda Israeli Air Force Base in the Uvda region of southern Israel, about 40 km (25 mi) north of Eilat. It was the country's second international airport. Ovda was originally built and opened as a military airbase in 1981 and was joint-used as a civilian airport a year later but ceased handling civilian flights on 31 March 2019 following the opening of Ramon Airport, which is located much closer to the city of Eilat than Ovda.

== History ==
Ovda Airbase was constructed for the Israeli Air Force (IAF) by the United States as a replacement for Etzion Air Force Base and opened in 1981. The Israeli Airports Authority began operations from Ovda Airport in 1982, after the signing of the peace treaty with Egypt. Previously all charter flights from Europe had landed at Etzion, however this was one of four airports in the Sinai that were handed over to Egypt as part of the Camp David Accords. A civilian terminal was built at the airport which handled direct charter flights from Europe.

In 1988 a decision was made that international flights bringing tourists to Eilat would land at Ovda, instead of at Eilat. This allowed the operation of large, wide-body aircraft, such as the Boeing 747, which could not operate from Eilat Airport. Between the late 1980s and 2019 most international flights landed at Ovda instead of Eilat. The runway at Ovda also allowed long range flights to take off for any European destination without the need to refuel.

In 2005, the airport had 746 international aircraft movements and 82,479 international passenger movements.

On 23 July 2014 after the temporary stoppage of international air traffic to Tel Aviv Ben Gurion Airport, due to rocket fire on Israeli cities from Gaza, Ovda Airport was opened to accept all international traffic. It was the diversion airport for flights to Israel until replaced in that role by Eilat Ramon Airport.

The airport ceased all civilian flights on March 31, 2019, now that Ramon Airport in the Timna Valley has opened.

In 2020 a plan was announced to establish Airpark, a large commercial aircraft storage facility at Ovda capable of storing hundreds of aircraft. The facility will be operated in association with IAI, a leading provider of aviation maintenance services. The fact that the co-located military facilities provide security as well as existing aircraft maintenance capabilities in the area were pointed to as favorable location factors in addition to the dry desert climate which limits corrosion.

== Airlines and destinations ==
All civilian traffic was transferred to Ramon Airport on 1 April 2019.

Prior to its closure to civilian traffic, Ovda airport received mostly international flights from Europe operated as charter flights or by low cost carriers. Most domestic flights (to and from Ben Gurion Airport, Haifa Airport and - prior to its closure - Sde Dov Airport) continued to use Eilat Airport as it was much more centrally located.

== Statistics ==
Total passengers and aircraft movements at Ovda Airport
| Year | Total passengers | Total aircraft movements |
|---|---|---|
| 2009 | 104,340 | 1,474 |
| 2010 | 124,316 | 1,370 |
| 2011 | 139,353 | 1,466 |
| 2012 | 118,732 | 1,006 |
| 2013 | 121,395 | 1,074 |
| 2014 | 94,585 | 821 |
| 2016 | 128,595 | 1,009 |
| 2017 | 209,515 | 1,631 |

== See also ==
- Taba Airport
- Operation Uvda
