= List of El Al destinations =

Destinations of EL AL Israeli Airlines

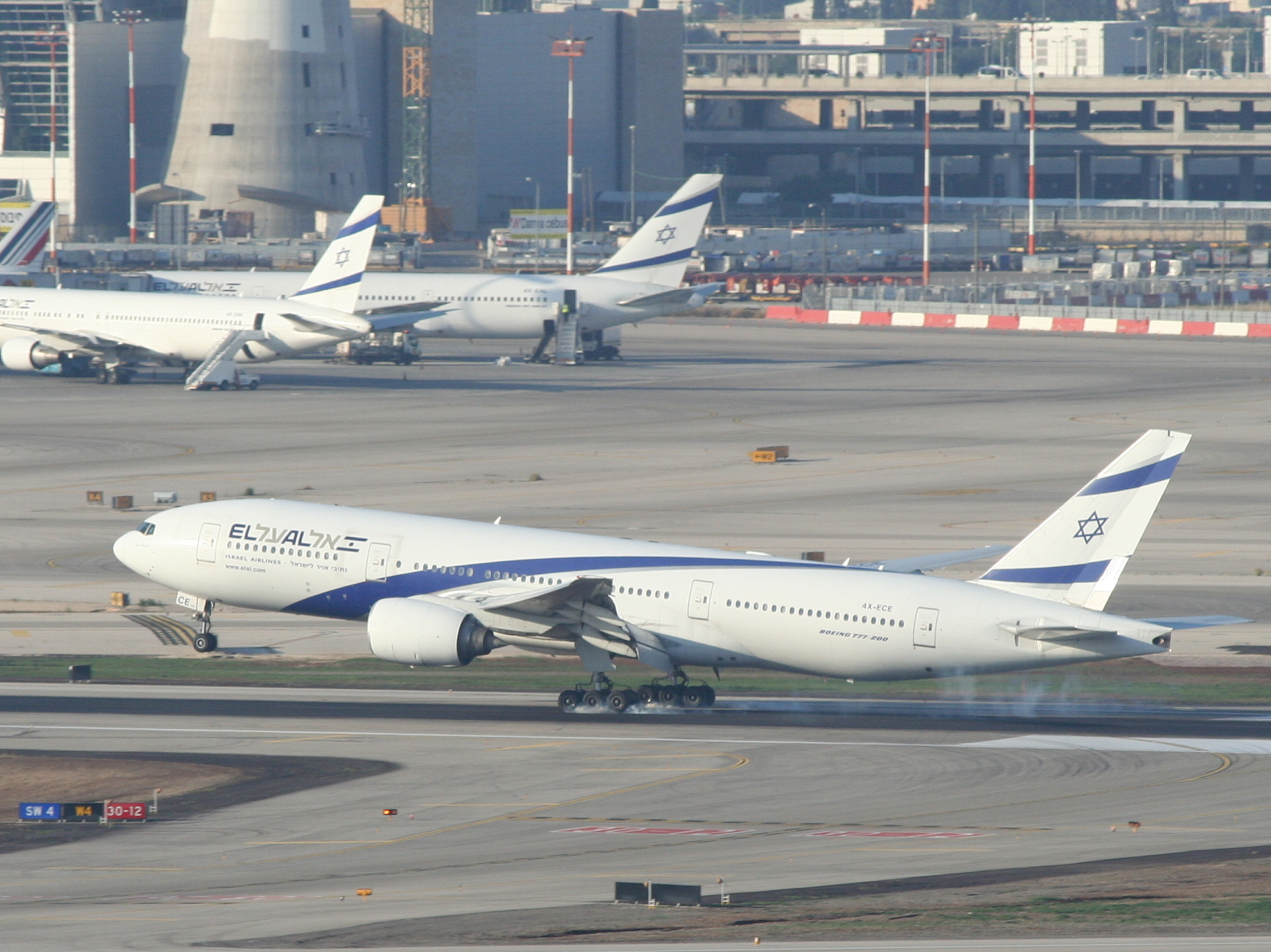
An El Al Boeing 777-200ER lands at Ben Gurion International Airport. Two more El Al aircraft can be seen in the background.

El Al was established by the Israeli government in November 1948. Initially offering a weekly service between Tel Aviv and Paris in 1949, the airline began flying to many European destinations the same year, with services to the United States and South Africa starting in 1951. Following delivery of their first Boeing 707–420 in May 1961, the carrier started flying scheduled New York City–Tel Aviv flights—the longest non-stop route flown by any airline at the time.

El Al flies to 51 destinations in Europe, Asia, Africa and North America. Following is a list of airports served by the carrier as part of its scheduled services.

== COVID-19 outbreak ==
On 30 January 2020, El Al suspended flights to Beijing because of the outbreak of COVID-19.

In March 2020, the airline saw reduced demand and cancelled flights to Europe. El Al proposed in early March 2020 to lay off one out of every six of its 6,200 employees. Israel has discontinued the entry from some nations of all non-Israelis and mandated that Israelis who return from said nations put themselves into a self-imposed two-week quarantine.

Due to the special circumstances caused by the coronavirus outbreak, and the recommendations by the Ministry of Health (of Israel) to the public, we are compelled to make commercial adjustments to certain flights, although as part of this we are providing alternative options on other flights. We apologize to our customers for the inconvenience.

— El Al, 2 March 2020

On 11 March, El Al suspended eight out of ten employees, and drastically reduced operations. The remaining employees, including all pilots, were to be paid 20% less.

== Destinations ==
Country	City	Airport	Notes	Refs
Argentina	Buenos Aires	Ministro Pistarini International Airport	Begins 29 November 2026	
Austria	Vienna	Vienna International Airport	Passenger	
Belarus	Minsk	Minsk National Airport	Terminated	
Belgium	Brussels	Brussels Airport	Terminated	
Belgium	Liège	Liège Airport	Terminated	
Brazil	São Paulo	São Paulo/Guarulhos International Airport	Terminated	
Bulgaria	Sofia	Vasil Levski Sofia Airport	Passenger	
Canada	Gander	Gander International Airport	Terminated	
Canada	Montreal	Montréal–Mirabel International Airport	Terminated	
Canada	Montreal	Montréal–Trudeau International Airport	Terminated	
Canada	Toronto	Toronto Pearson International Airport	Terminated	
China	Beijing	Beijing Capital International Airport	Terminated	
Croatia	Dubrovnik	Dubrovnik Airport	Terminated	
Croatia	Zagreb	Zagreb Airport	Terminated	
Cyprus	Larnaca	Larnaca International Airport	Terminated	
Cyprus	Nicosia	Nicosia International Airport	Airport closed	
Czech Republic	Prague	Václav Havel Airport Prague	Passenger	
Denmark	Copenhagen	Copenhagen Airport	Terminated	
Egypt	Cairo	Cairo International Airport	Terminated	
Ethiopia	Addis Ababa	Addis Ababa Bole International Airport	Terminated	
France	Marseille	Marseille Provence Airport	Terminated	
France	Nice	Nice Côte d'Azur Airport	Passenger	
France	Paris	Charles de Gaulle Airport	Passenger	
France	Paris	Orly Airport	Terminated	
Georgia	Tbilisi	Shota Rustaveli Tbilisi International Airport	Terminated	
Germany	Berlin	Berlin Brandenburg Airport	Passenger	
Germany	Berlin	Berlin Schönefeld Airport	Airport closed	
Germany	Cologne/Bonn	Cologne Bonn Airport	Terminated	
Germany	Düsseldorf	Düsseldorf Airport	Terminated	
Germany	Frankfurt	Frankfurt Airport	Passenger + cargo	
Germany	Hanover	Hannover Airport	Terminated	
Germany	Munich	Munich Airport	Passenger	
Greece	Athens	Athens International Airport	Passenger	
Greece	Athens	Ellinikon International Airport	Airport closed	
Greece	Rhodes	Rhodes International Airport	Terminated	
Hong Kong	Hong Kong	Hong Kong International Airport	Terminated	
Hungary	Budapest	Budapest Ferenc Liszt International Airport	Passenger	
India	Delhi	Indira Gandhi International Airport	Terminated	
India	Mumbai	Chhatrapati Shivaji Maharaj International Airport	Terminated	
Iran	Tehran	Tehran Mehrabad International Airport	Terminated	
Ireland	Dublin	Dublin Airport	Terminated	
Ireland	Shannon	Shannon Airport	Terminated	
Israel	Eilat	Eilat Airport	Airport closed	
Israel	Eilat	Ramon Airport	Terminated	
Israel	Jerusalem	Atarot Airport	Airport closed	
Israel	Tel Aviv	Ben Gurion Airport	Hub	
Italy	Milan	Milan Malpensa Airport	Passenger	
Italy	Naples	Naples International Airport	Terminated	
Italy	Rome	Rome Fiumicino Airport	Passenger	
Italy	Venice	Venice Marco Polo Airport	Seasonal	
Japan	Tokyo	Narita International Airport	Passenger	
Jordan	Amman	Queen Alia International Airport	Terminated	
Kazakhstan	Almaty	Almaty International Airport	Terminated	
Kenya	Nairobi	Jomo Kenyatta International Airport	Terminated	
Latvia	Riga	Riga International Airport	Terminated	
Luxembourg	Luxembourg City	Luxembourg Airport	Terminated	
Mexico	Mexico City	Mexico City International Airport	Terminated	
Moldova	Chișinău	Chișinău International Airport	Terminated	
Morocco	Casablanca	Mohammed V International Airport	Terminated	
Morocco	Marrakesh	Marrakesh Menara Airport	Terminated	
Netherlands	Amsterdam	Amsterdam Airport Schiphol	Passenger	
Poland	Kraków	Kraków John Paul II International Airport	Terminated	
Poland	Lublin	Lublin Airport	Cargo	
Poland	Warsaw	Warsaw Chopin Airport	Terminated	
Portugal	Lisbon	Lisbon Airport	Passenger	
Romania	Bucharest	Henri Coandă International Airport	Passenger	
Russia	Moscow	Moscow Domodedovo Airport	Suspended until 25 March 2027	
Russia	Saint Petersburg	Pulkovo Airport	Terminated	
Seychelles	Mahé	Seychelles International Airport	Terminated	
South Africa	Johannesburg	O. R. Tambo International Airport	Terminated	
South Korea	Seoul	Incheon International Airport	Resumes 27 March 2027	
Spain	Barcelona	Josep Tarradellas Barcelona–El Prat Airport	Passenger	
Spain	Madrid	Adolfo Suárez Madrid–Barajas Airport	Passenger	
Switzerland	Geneva	Geneva Airport	Passenger	
Switzerland	Zürich	Zürich Airport	Passenger	
Sudan	Khartoum	Khartoum International Airport	Terminated	
Thailand	Bangkok	Suvarnabhumi Airport	Passenger	
Thailand	Phuket	Phuket International Airport	Passenger	
Turkey	Antalya	Antalya Airport	Terminated	
Turkey	Istanbul	Istanbul Atatürk Airport	Airport closed	
Turkey	Istanbul	Istanbul Airport	Terminated	
Ukraine	Dnipro	Dnipropetrovsk International Airport	Terminated	
Ukraine	Kyiv	Boryspil International Airport	Terminated	
Ukraine	Odesa	Odesa International Airport	Terminated	
United Arab Emirates	Dubai	Dubai International Airport	Passenger	
United Kingdom	London	Heathrow Airport	Passenger	
United Kingdom	London	Luton Airport	Passenger	
United Kingdom	London	London Stansted Airport	Terminated	
United Kingdom	Manchester	Manchester Airport	Terminated	
United States	Atlanta	Hartsfield–Jackson Atlanta International Airport	Terminated	
United States	Baltimore	Baltimore/Washington International Airport	Terminated	
United States	Boston	Logan International Airport	Passenger	
United States	Chicago	O'Hare International Airport	Terminated	
United States	Fort Lauderdale	Fort Lauderdale–Hollywood International Airport	Terminated	
United States	Las Vegas	Harry Reid International Airport	Terminated	
United States	Los Angeles	Los Angeles International Airport	Passenger	
United States	Miami	Miami International Airport	Passenger	
United States	Newark	Newark Liberty International Airport	Passenger	
United States	New York City	John F. Kennedy International Airport	Passenger	
United States	Orlando	Orlando International Airport	Terminated	
United States	San Francisco	San Francisco International Airport		
Uzbekistan	Tashkent	Tashkent International Airport	Terminated	
Zambia	Livingstone	Livingstone Airport	Terminated	

== See also ==
- Transport in Israel
