= Israir =

Low-cost airline of Israel

Israir ישראייר
IATA	ICAO	Call sign
6H	ISR	ISRAIR
- Founded: 1989; 37 years ago (as Knafei HaEmek); 1996; 30 years ago (as Israir)
- Operating bases: Ben Gurion Airport
- Fleet size: 10
- Destinations: 19
- Parent company: Rami Levy group (as BGI)
- Headquarters: Tel Aviv, Israel
- Key people: Uri Sirkis, CEO
- Website: Official website

Israir Airlines Ltd., more commonly referred to as Israir, is an Israeli low-cost airline headquartered in Tel Aviv. It operates domestic scheduled and air taxi flights from Ben Gurion International Airport, and Ramon Airport as well as scheduled and charter international services from Ben Gurion International Airport to Europe and Asia. It also operates VIP flights, and is Israel's second largest airline after El Al, surpassing Arkia Israel Airlines during the coronavirus pandemic, employing some 350 staff.

== History ==
=== Foundation and early years ===
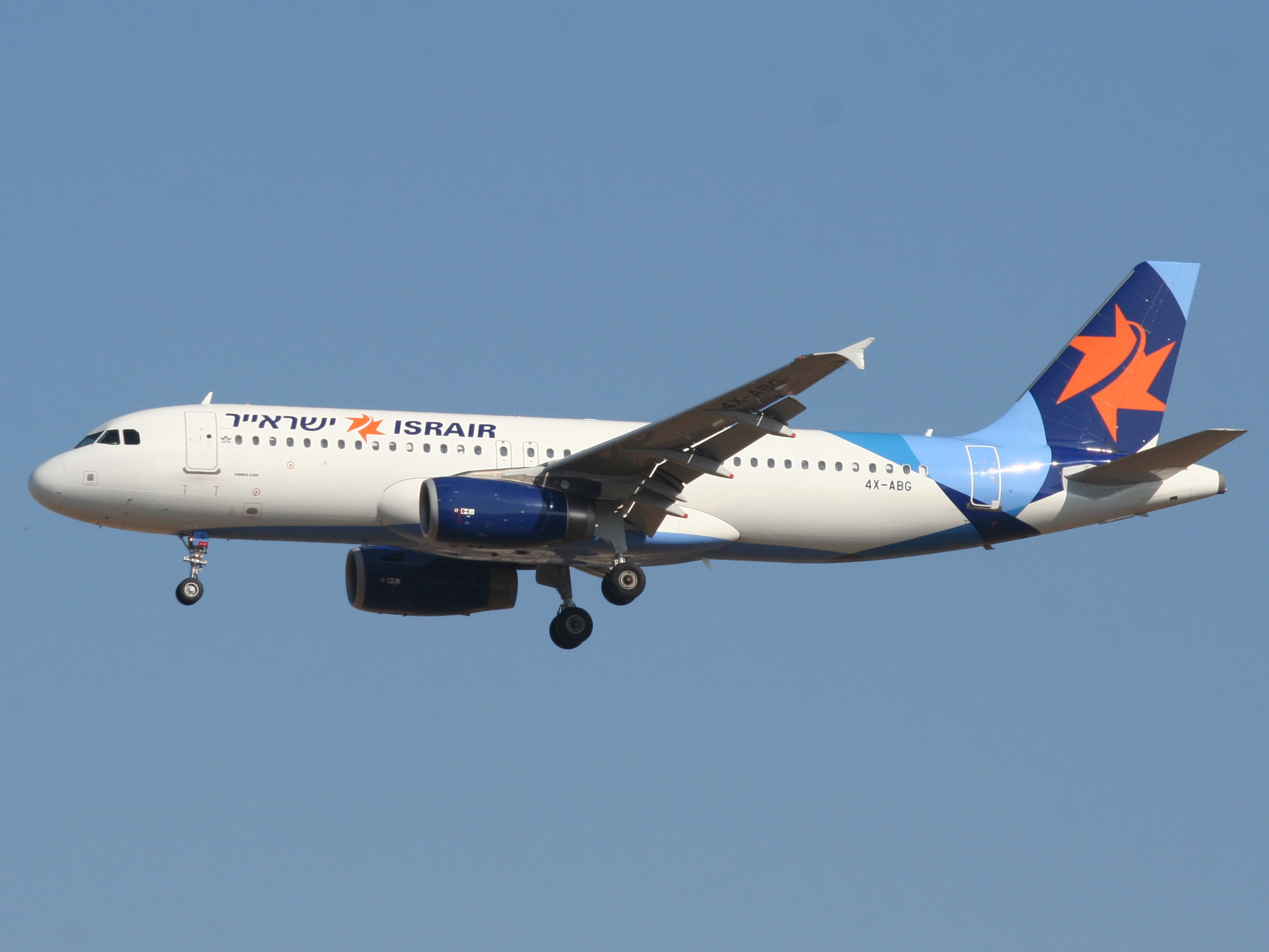
Israir A320-200

Israir Airlines was established in 1989 as Kanfei HaEmek (Valley Wings) before changing its name to Israir Airlines in 1996. It is now wholly owned by the Rami Levi Group. The airline began with domestic services from Eilat Airport, Ben Gurion International Airport, Sde Dov Airport, and Haifa Airport in the north of the country. It expanded its operations to begin international charter flights in 1999, building up a route network that now covers much of Europe, as well as regularly flying to other destinations in Asia, Africa, and North America. The airline is said to have modeled itself on US low-cost carrier JetBlue.

The airline expanded operations across the Atlantic Ocean when regular charter service to New York City's John F. Kennedy International Airport was started in June 2004. Permission was granted to the airline to convert this to regular scheduled service by the Israeli government and the FAA on May 1, 2006. In April 2008, the airline received an Airbus A330 for its New York flights to replace the Boeing 767 aircraft it had previously been wet-leasing. However, it instead cancelled the flights in 2008 for cost reasons and phased out widebody aircraft.

In 2006, Israir signed a deal to acquire Airbus A320 narrow-body aircraft. This made it the first Israeli airline to purchase Airbus aircraft.

In early 2007, the airline announced plans to introduce Sky-Torah scrolls on each of its aircraft. These were effectively Torah scrolls which would be carried on board its flight for Jewish passengers to use for prayer. This is a first for any Israeli airline and was seen by many as a means to attract many Haredi passengers to the airline at a time when they were showing great dissatisfaction with arch-rival, El Al, following their flying of aircraft on the Shabbat.

In early 2008, when restrictions were lifted on Israeli airlines' destinations, Israir applied for designated carrier status on routes from Israel to London, Paris, Berlin, Moscow, Amsterdam, Rome, Budapest, Las Vegas, and Miami – some of which had previously been served by the airline as charter destinations.

=== Developments since 2010 ===
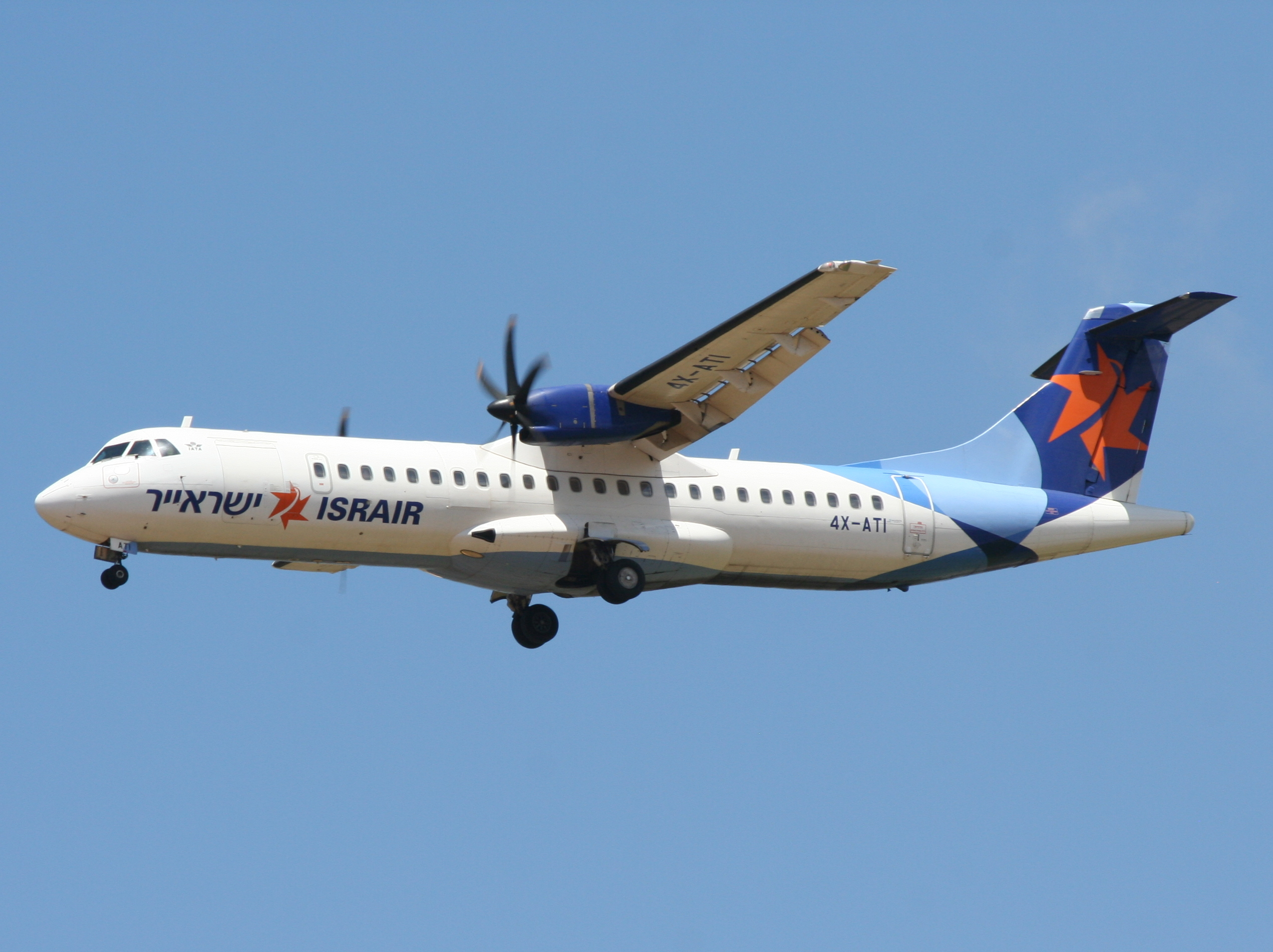
A former Israir ATR 72-200 in 2014

Israir received the first of the two ATR 72 aircraft it had on order in early July 2011 to replace the ATR 42, with the second one expected to follow later that month. In 2014, the airline posted losses of 18.4 million shekel. On 25 May 2015, an Israir Airbus A320-200 has been seized by Portuguese authorities while in Lisbon over unpaid debts to Portuguese airline euroAtlantic Airways for a leasing contract in 2008. Also in May 2015, El Al confirmed it was in talks to merge its subsidiary Sun D'Or into Israir. While Sun D'Or would be dissolved, El Al would gain shares in Israir instead.

In October 2020, it was announced that the company is being auctioned off, the bids need to be submitted by November 8. On October 4, the first bid was submitted by Rami Levy and Shalom Haim through BGI Investments. On October 13, Dubai-based NY Koen Group, headed by Naum Koen, has announced its intention to participate in the auction.

In 2025, Israir announced plans to relaunch of flights to New York from Tel Aviv providing competition to the route after U.S. carriers suspended service in the wake of Iran's attacks on Israel. The airline acquired two former American Airlines A330-200 widebody aircraft to operate the longhaul service.

In August 2026, the airline received final regulatory permission from the Federal Aviation Authority to begin service between Israel and the United States, with service between New York City and Ben Gurion Airport in Tel Aviv. The airline had planned to begin service on October 19 but may start earlier, given the timing of the FAA approval.

== Destinations ==
Country	City	Airport	Notes	Refs
Albania	Tirana	Tirana International Airport Nënë Tereza		
Armenia	Yerevan	Zvartnots International Airport	Terminated	
Austria	Salzburg	Salzburg Airport W. A. Mozart		
Azerbaijan	Baku	Heydar Aliyev International Airport		
Bosnia and Herzegovina	Sarajevo	Sarajevo International Airport	Seasonal	
Bulgaria	Burgas	Burgas Airport	Seasonal	
Bulgaria	Plovdiv	Plovdiv Airport	Seasonal charter	
Bulgaria	Sofia	Vasil Levski Sofia Airport		
Bulgaria	Varna	Varna Airport	Seasonal charter	
Croatia	Split	Split Saint Jerome Airport	Terminated	
Cyprus	Larnaca	Larnaca International Airport		
Cyprus	Paphos	Paphos International Airport		
Czech Republic	Prague	Václav Havel Airport Prague		
Egypt	Sharm El Sheikh	Sharm El Sheikh International Airport	Terminated	
Finland	Rovaniemi	Rovaniemi Airport	Seasonal	
France	Grenoble	Alpes–Isère Airport	Seasonal	
France	Nice	Nice Côte d'Azur Airport	Terminated	
Georgia	Batumi	Alexander Kartveli Batumi International Airport		
Georgia	Tbilisi	Shota Rustaveli Tbilisi International Airport		
Germany	Berlin	Berlin Brandenburg Airport		
Germany	Düsseldorf	Düsseldorf Airport		
Germany	Leipzig	Leipzig/Halle Airport	Terminated	
Germany	Stuttgart	Stuttgart Airport	Seasonal	
Greece	Athens	Athens International Airport Eleftherios Venizelos		
Greece	Chania	Chania International Airport "Daskalogiannis"	Seasonal	
Greece	Corfu	Corfu International Airport "Ioannis Kapodistrias"	Seasonal	
Greece	Rhodes	Rhodes International Airport "Diagoras"	Seasonal	
Greece	Thessaloniki	Thessaloniki Airport "Makedonia"		
Greece	Thira	Santorini International Airport	Seasonal	
Hungary	Budapest	Budapest Ferenc Liszt International Airport		
Hungary	Debrecen	Debrecen International Airport	Terminated	
Iceland	Reykjavík	Keflavík International Airport	Terminated	
Italy	Bari	Bari Karol Wojtyła Airport		
Italy	Bergamo	Orio al Serio International Airport	Terminated	
Italy	Bologna	Bologna Guglielmo Marconi Airport		
Italy	Catania	Catania–Fontanarossa Airport	Seasonal	
Italy	Milan	Milan Malpensa Airport		
Italy	Naples	Naples-Capodichino International Airport	Seasonal	
Italy	Olbia	Olbia Costa Smeralda Airport	Seasonal	
Italy	Rome	Leonardo da Vinci–Fiumicino Airport		
Italy	Verona	Verona Villafranca Airport	Seasonal	
Israel	Eilat	Eilat Airport	Airport closed	
Israel	Eilat	Ramon Airport		
Israel	Haifa	Uri Michaeli Haifa International Airport	Terminated	
Israel	Tel Aviv	David Ben Gurion International Airport	Base	
Israel	Tel Aviv	Sde Dov Airport	Airport closed	
Lithuania	Vilnius	Vilnius Čiurlionis International Airport		
Moldova	Chișinău	Chișinău Eugen Doga International Airport	Terminated	
Montenegro	Tivat	Tivat Airport	Seasonal	
North Macedonia	Skopje	Skopje International Airport	Terminated	
Norway	Bergen	Bergen Airport, Flesland	Terminated	
Norway	Oslo	Oslo Airport, Gardermoen	Terminated	
Poland	Warsaw	Warsaw Chopin Airport	Terminated	
Portugal	Lisbon	Humberto Delgado Airport	Terminated	
Romania	Bucharest	Henri Coandă International Airport		
Serbia	Belgrade	Belgrade Nikola Tesla Airport	Terminated	
Spain	Madrid	Madrid-Barajas Airport		
Spain	Málaga	Málaga–Costa del Sol Airport	Seasonal	
Switzerland	Basel	EuroAirport Basel Mulhouse Freiburg		
Tanzania	Zanzibar	Abeid Amani Karume International Airport	Seasonal charter	
Turkey	Istanbul	Istanbul Airport	Terminated	
United Arab Emirates	Dubai	Dubai International Airport	Terminated	
United Kingdom	London	Luton Airport		
United States	New York City	John F. Kennedy International Airport		

=== Codeshare partners ===
Israir has codeshare agreements with the following airline:

- American Airlines
- Smartwings

== Fleet ==
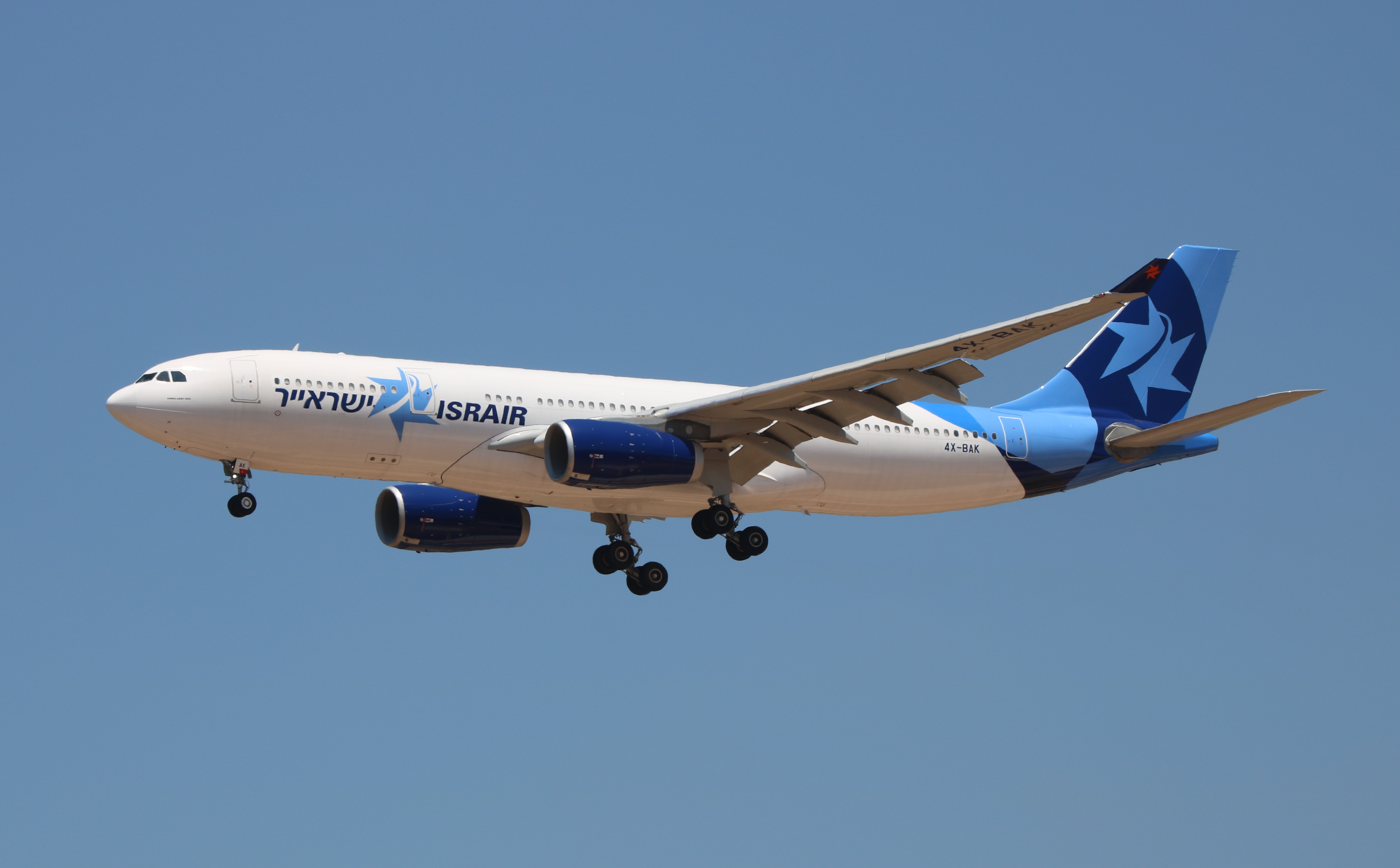
An Israir Airbus A330-200 in 2026

=== Current fleet ===
As of July 2026, Israir operates the following aircraft:

Israir fleet
Aircraft	In service	Orders	Passengers					Notes
Aircraft	In service	Orders	J	W	Y+	Y	Total	Notes
Airbus A320-200	8	—	8	—	—	156	164	
Airbus A320-200	8	—	—	—	—	174	174	
Airbus A330-200	2	—	20	21	54	152	247	Former American Airlines aircraft, retaining their interior configuration.
Total	10	—						

=== Fleet development ===
Israir announced during December 2025 that it would purchase two Airbus A330 aircraft for $74 million.

== Incidents and accidents ==
- In June 2001, one of Israir's ATR 42-320 aircraft was damaged beyond repair following a heavy landing at Ben Gurion Airport. Despite the aircraft being written off, no passengers were injured in this incident.
- On July 6, 2005, a fully loaded Israir 767 accidentally taxied onto an active runway at JFK, and a Douglas DC-8 cargo aircraft narrowly avoided collision by taking off at full throttle above them, with only 45 feet of clearance over the 767.
- In May 2007, an Israir aircraft on a test flight was almost shot down by Israeli F-16 jets after it entered a demarcation zone where airlines are expected to identify themselves.
- Later that month, on May 23, an Israir flight had to make an emergency landing following smoke build up in the cabin on approach at Berlin-Schönefeld International Airport. No one was injured in the incident.
- In July 2008, an Israir aircraft flew from Eilat Airport to Ben Gurion International Airport with a small hole in its frame. The hole was discovered by mechanics at Ben Gurion and there was an investigation as to whether or not Israir knew of the hole, which, as it turns out, was caused by Israir workers in Eilat when they crashed a mobile staircase into the aircraft's body. The plane was scheduled to fly to Italy from Tel Aviv, and at an altitude of over 10,000 meters, the plane would most likely have experienced a decompression.
- In January 2025, an Israir aircraft that was meant to fly from Tel Aviv to London declared an emergency and returned to Ben Gurion International Airport after flying in circles for three hours to burn fuel before landing.
