= Eilat Airport =

Former airport of Eilat, Israel (1949–2019)

Eilat Airport שדה התעופה הישן של אילת
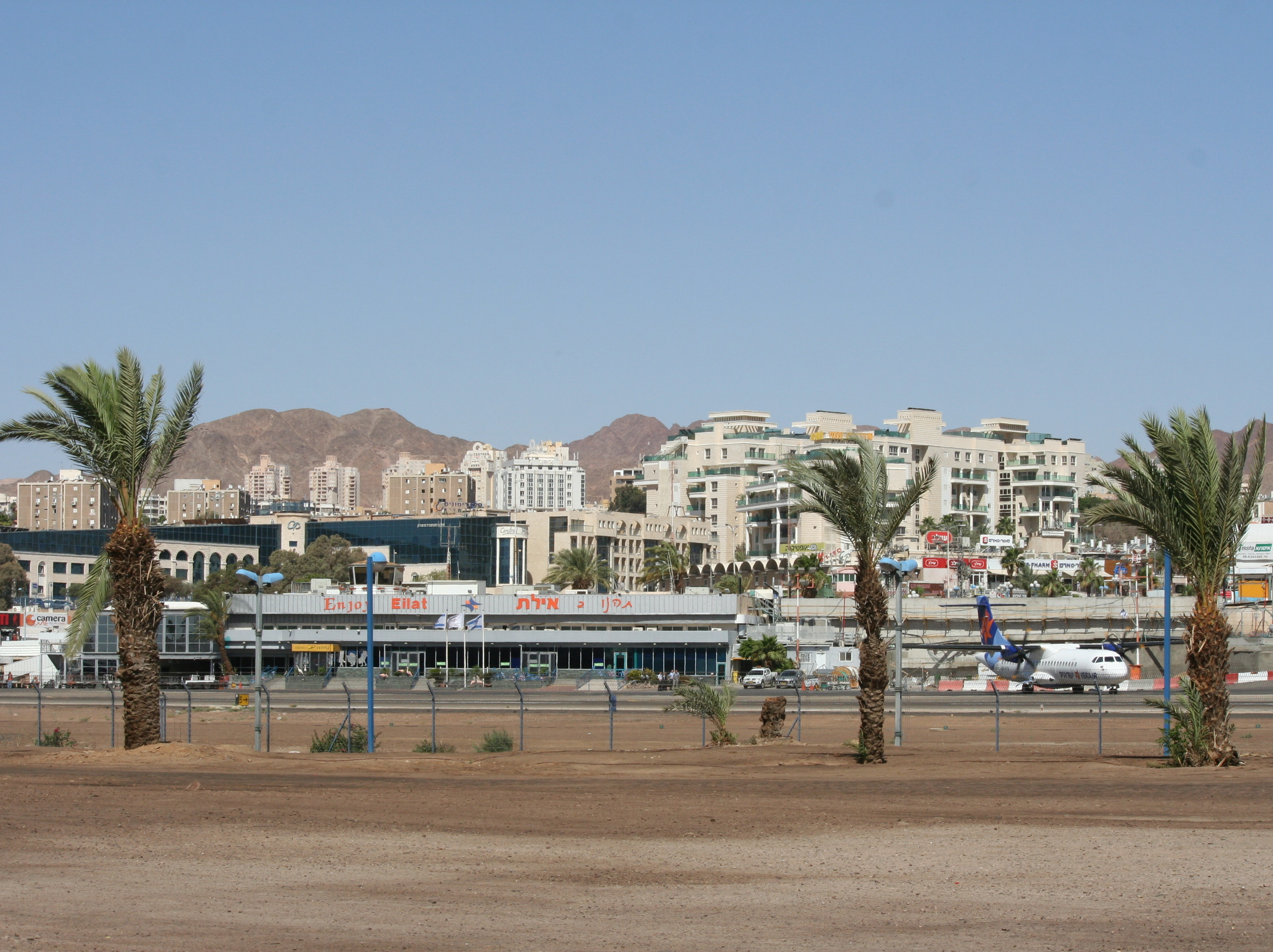
- IATA: ETH; ICAO: LLET

Summary
- Airport type: Defunct
- Owner/Operator: Israel Airports Authority
- Serves: Eilat, Israel
- Opened: 1949
- Closed: March 18, 2019
- Focus city for: Arkia; Israir Airlines
- Elevation AMSL: 42 ft (13 m)
- Coordinates: 29°33′30″N 34°57′32″E
- Website: iaa.gov.il

Map
- Location within Israel

Runways
Direction	Length		Surface
Direction	ft	m	Surface
~~03/21~~	~~6,234~~	~~1,900~~	~~Asphalt~~ (Closed)

Statistics (2014)
- Passengers: 1,424,098
- Aircraft movements: 18,966
- Source: Israel Airports Authority

Eilat Airport (Hebrew: שְׂדֵה הַתְּעוּפָה אֵילַת, romanized: Namal HaTe'ufa Eilat; Arabic: مطار إيلات (IATA: ETH, ICAO: LLET)), also known as J. Hozman Airport, was an airport located in Eilat, Israel. It was named after Arkia Airlines founder Yakov Hozman (Jacob Housman) and was located in the center of Eilat adjacent to Route 90 (The Arava Road). Due to its short runway and limited capacity it mainly handled domestic flights from Tel Aviv (Sde Dov Airport and to a lesser extent Ben Gurion Airport) and Haifa Airport, while Uvda International Airport, located some 60 km (40 mi) north of the city, handled Eilat's international carriers.

The airport was expected to cease operations on October 27, 2018, with the opening of the new Ramon Airport. However, the opening of the new airport was delayed until January 21, 2019.

Following the inauguration of Ramon Airport located approximately 20 km north of the city, Eilat Airport ceased operations on March 18, 2019. The new, larger airport now handles all of Eilat's domestic and international flights as Uvda Airport also ceased receiving civilian traffic upon the opening of Ramon Airport.

== History ==
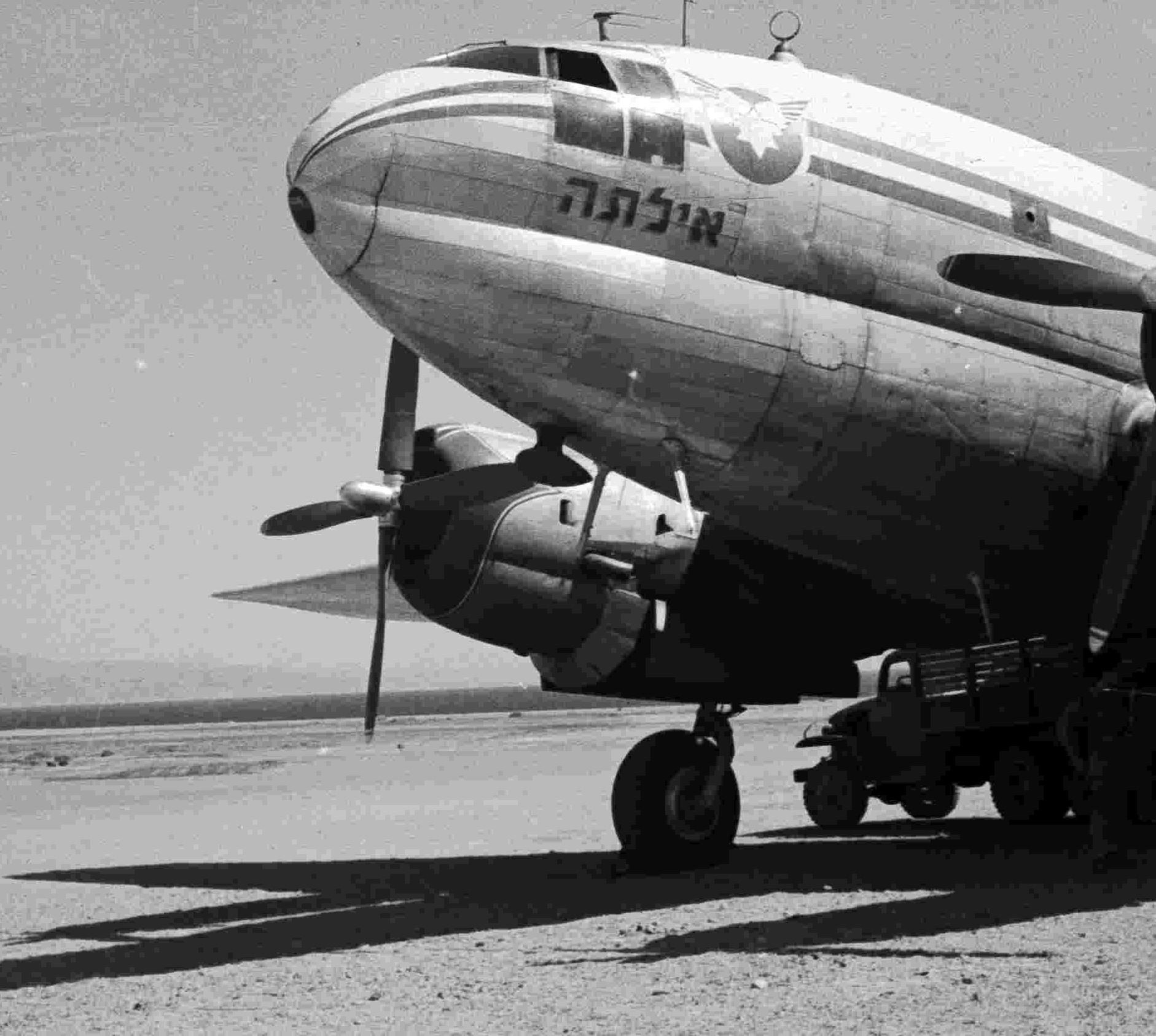
C-46 Commando 4X-ACT Eilata operated by El Al in Eilat Airport (~1952)

Eilat Airport was established in 1949 by the Israel Air Force, following the 1947–1949 Palestine war. During its early years, the airport aimed to establish a comprehensive set of connections to towns across the country, most notably with Tel Aviv and Haifa. Consequently, a regular route from Eilat to Lod Airport (now Ben Gurion International Airport) was started. Soon after, a route to Haifa Airport became operational. In December 1950, following their establishment, Arkia Israel Airlines became the largest domestic operator at Eilat Airport, taking the position of the former companies Eilata and Aviron. To this day, they retain this position. Later, in 1964 the runway was expanded to 1,500 metres (4,900 ft), and a passenger terminal was built. Five years later, the runway was further expanded to 1,900 metres (6,200 ft). In 1975, Eilat Airport started to attract Scandinavian airlines. The first international flight arrival to Eilat, of the Danish airline, Sterling Airlines landed in this year. Afterward, many international routes were established directly linking Eilat with Europe; however, the airport was still unable to handle landings of large aircraft, which had to fly to Uvda International Airport.

In the 1994 peace agreement between Israel and Jordan it was decided to transfer operations from Eilat Airport to Aqaba Airport. The original plan was to rename Aqaba Airport as Aqaba-Eilat Peace International Airport. The agreement was never followed, however, and an agreement between the two countries in March 1997 stipulated that domestic flights would continue to use Eilat Airport, whilst no further action to move international flights took place.

In August 2005, a Katyusha rocket fired from Jordan landed near a taxi traveling just 15 yards (14 m) from the airport perimeter fence. On August 8, 2013, the Israeli military instructed the airport to cancel all landings and departures after a security assessment. Militants in Egypt's Sinai Peninsula had fired rockets towards the city in recent years, but it was not immediately clear if that was the reason for the closure.

== Final years of service ==
During its latest period of service, Eilat Airport sustained peak loads concentrated into Thursdays, Saturdays, and Sundays. On Thursdays and Sundays, flights were handled in a period of a few hours in the mornings, and on Saturdays only the evening hours were used. Often there were days when 10,000 passengers on 120 flights were channeled through the 2,800 m^{2} terminal, which counted as one of the highest peak loads worldwide in this category.

International passenger traffic decreased from a magnitude of 20,000 a year in the late 2000s to 5,000 a year in the 2010s. Most international traffic to Eilat was handled by Ovda Airport instead, while Eilat Airport handled about 1.5 million domestic passengers per year. A little more than half of them flew to or from Sde Dov Airport in Tel Aviv (which itself was closed several months after the closing of Eilat Airport), while the rest flew mostly to Ben Gurion Airport, with smaller numbers to Haifa Airport.

Although the airport was capable of handling Boeing 767 aircraft, for large numbers of these aircraft, significant investment would have been needed. Consequently, the largest aircraft that regularly flew to the airport were Boeing 757s. The main problem at the airport was the lack of ramp space, with just two parking positions for large aircraft. As a result, El Al operated regular shuttle flights to Ben Gurion International Airport carrying passengers from around the world on 757s and 737s.

The small size of the airport is perhaps best illustrated with the fact that a Boeing 757 could not taxi past another aircraft to parking positions. As a result, controllers were responsible not only for ensuring that valuable space was utilised, but also for ensuring that other aircraft were kept circling until larger aircraft were parked. Despite these limitations, the airport successfully handled ten to twenty times more traffic than airports of a comparable size. It is for this reason that plans to relocate the airport were so important in the short-term scale. In 2006, a NIS 5.5 million renovation programme of Eilat Airport's terminal and runway was undertaken, designed to sustain the airport until it was replaced.

== End of operations ==
Since the beginning of the 1990s, authorities in Eilat had considered relocating the airport out of the city limits. There were numerous reasons behind this idea, primarily the fact that safety would be improved as, in its current location, there is the chance of aircraft crashing into buildings in the city. Other reasons were the pure value of the land which the airport occupied, and the fact that the airport divided the city of Eilat into two parts with the hotels and tourist areas on one side, and the residential buildings on the other.

On 24 July 2011 the Israeli cabinet approved the construction of a new airport in Timna Valley, 18 km (11 mi) north of Eilat, next to Be'er Ora. Ramon Airport opened in 2019 and is named in memory of the first Israeli astronaut Ilan Ramon (who died during the Space Shuttle Columbia disaster in 2003) and his son Assaf Ramon (who died in 2009 when his F-16 fighter jet crashed over the West Bank). It has a 3,600 m (11,800 ft) runway, 1,700 metres (5,600 ft) longer than the runway in Eilat, which allows large aircraft (except the Airbus A380) to land. The length of the runway at Ramon Airport allows for flights that have to divert from Tel Aviv Ben Gurion Airport to land there and avoid the potential political issues of a flight diverting to another country.

== The site after closure of the airport ==
Following the inauguration of Ramon Airport, Eilat Airport ceased all operations on March 18, 2019. Its land, located in the heart of the city, was expected to be used for real estate development. All in all some 750,000 square metres (8,100,000 sq ft) of former airport land was to be redeveloped as part of larger plans to develop the city of Eilat. The focus of new development is planned to be on tourism. In addition to freeing up the land of the former airport itself, the closure also allowed for an end of height restriction laws affecting buildings in the vicinity. Plans called for 1,700 hotel beds and 1,920 housing units on former airport grounds. As Sde Dov Airport in Tel Aviv (which likewise occupied potentially high value real estate in a growing Israeli city) also shut down in 2019, Israel had two major projects of former airport land redevelopment going into the 2020s.

== Statistics ==
Total passengers and aircraft movements at Eilat Airport
Year	Total passengers	Total aircraft movements
2009	1,056,752	16,662
2010	1,293,254	18,298
2011	1,394,900	18,455
2012	1,448,423	18,248
2013	1,463,682	17,663
2014	1,424,098	18,966
