= Sde Dov Airport =

Defunct airport of Tel Aviv, Israel (1938–2019)

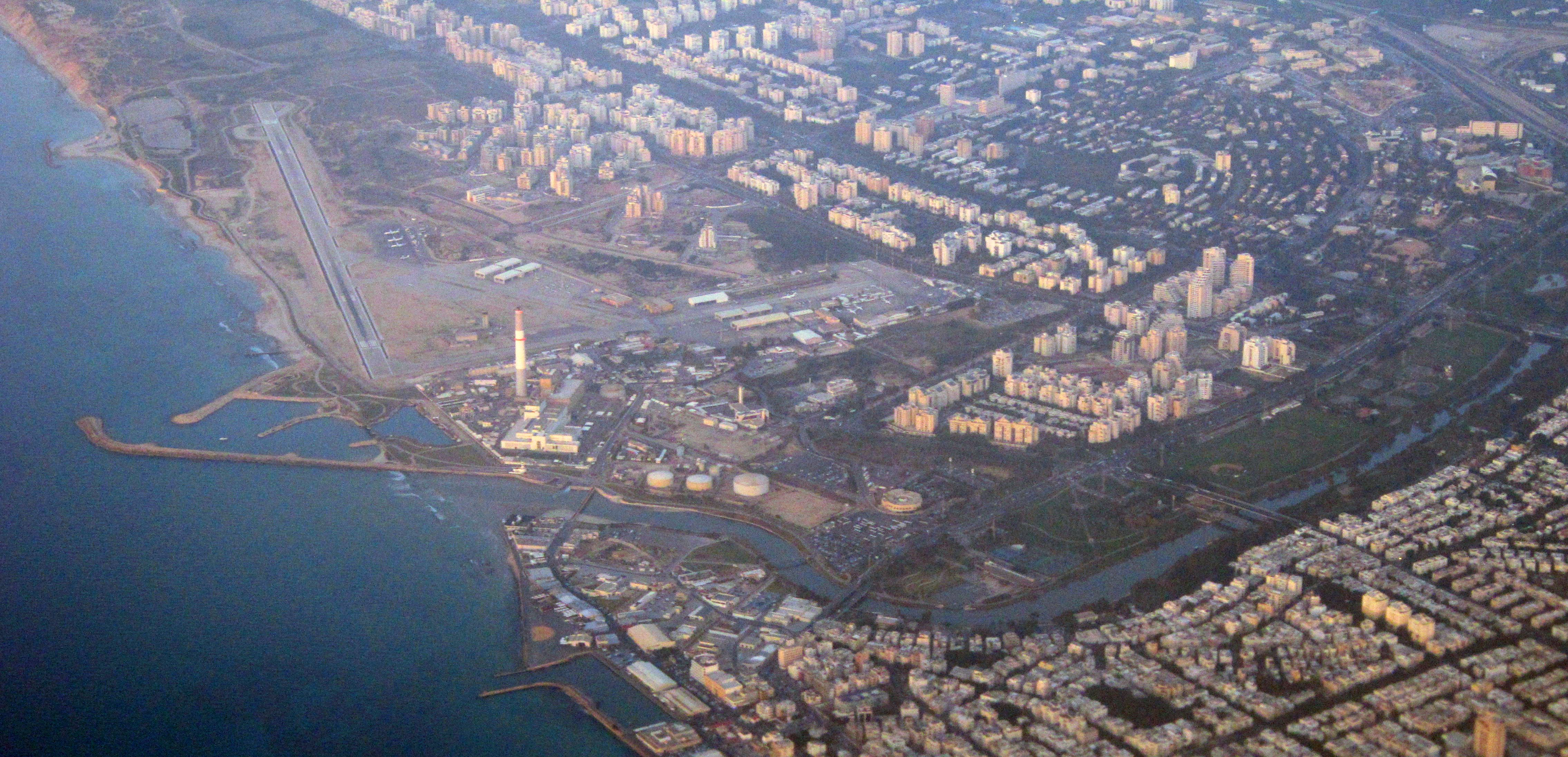
- Sde Dov Airport and Reading Power Station, 2012.
- IATA: SDV; ICAO: LLSD

Summary
- Airport type: Defunct
- Operator: Israel Airports Authority
- Serves: ~~Tel Aviv~~
- Location: Tel Aviv, Israel
- Opened: 23 September 1938
- Closed: 30 June 2019
- Elevation AMSL: 42 ft (13 m)
- Coordinates: 32°6′38.99″N 34°46′46.01″E
- Website: www.iaa.gov.il

Map
- Location within Israel

Runways
Direction	Length		Surface
Direction	ft	m	Surface
~~03/21~~	~~5,712~~	~~1,741~~	~~Asphalt~~ (Closed)

Statistics (2007)
- Total Passenger Movements: 703,649
- Total Aircraft Movements: 36,427

Sde Dov Airport (Hebrew: שְׂדֵה דֹּב, lit. Dov Field, Arabic: مطار سدي دوف), also known as Dov Hoz Airport (Hebrew: נמל התעופה דב הוז, Nemal HaTe'ufa Dov Hoz, Arabic: مطار دوف هوز) (IATA: SDV, ICAO: LLSD) was an airport in Tel Aviv, Israel that mainly handled scheduled domestic flights to Eilat, northern Israel (Haifa, the Galilee, and the Golan Heights), as well as having served as a base for the Israeli Air Force (IAF). It was the largest airport in Tel Aviv proper, and the second largest in the area, after Ben Gurion Airport on the outskirts of Lod. The airport opened in 1938 and was named after Dov Hoz, one of the pioneers of Jewish aviation. It ceased operations on 30 June 2019 after a controversial, long-delayed plan came into effect to close the airport in order to build high-end residential apartments on its valuable beachfront property. Commercial flights were moved to Ben Gurion Airport and military flights were moved to other IAF bases. The airport was a focus city for Arkia Israel Airlines and Israir Airlines.

== History ==
=== Early history ===
In 1937, the mayor of Tel Aviv, Israel Rokach, asked the British mandate authorities for permission to create an airport in Mandatory Palestine, promising to solve the transportation problem of Jews during the Arab revolt of 1936–1939 when travelling from Tel Aviv through Arab territory to the main airport at Lydda, to catch Palestine Airways flights to Haifa, was difficult and dangerous. Works began on a plot of land north of the Yarkon River, Tel Aviv, and when completed in October 1938, the airport served regular flights to Haifa, with the option of flights to Beirut. In 1940, the airport's name was changed to Sde Dov in memory of Dov Hoz, one of the pioneers of Jewish aviation. Sde Dov was abandoned after Palestine Airways ceased operations in August 1940, and the site was used as a British Army base until December 1947 when with British permission the runway was reopened by the Haganah.

In the 1948 Arab–Israeli War, the airport served as a base of the Israeli Air Force. It was a central base, home to 21 aircraft at the time. The first military flight was made in December 1947, when Pinchas Ben Porat flew an RWD-13 to Beit Eshel to rescue an injured soldier.

=== After the war ===
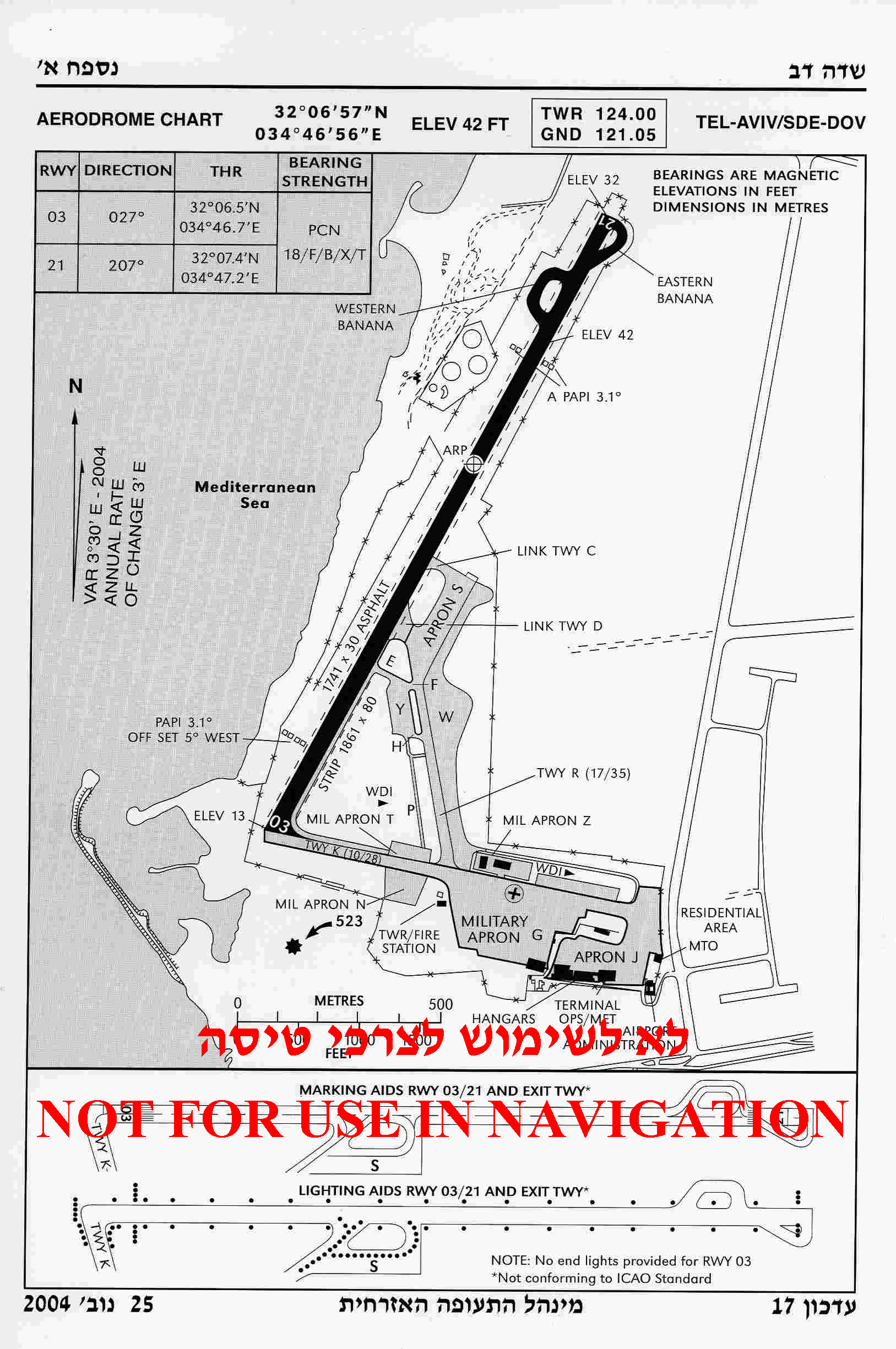
Sde Dov Airport Chart

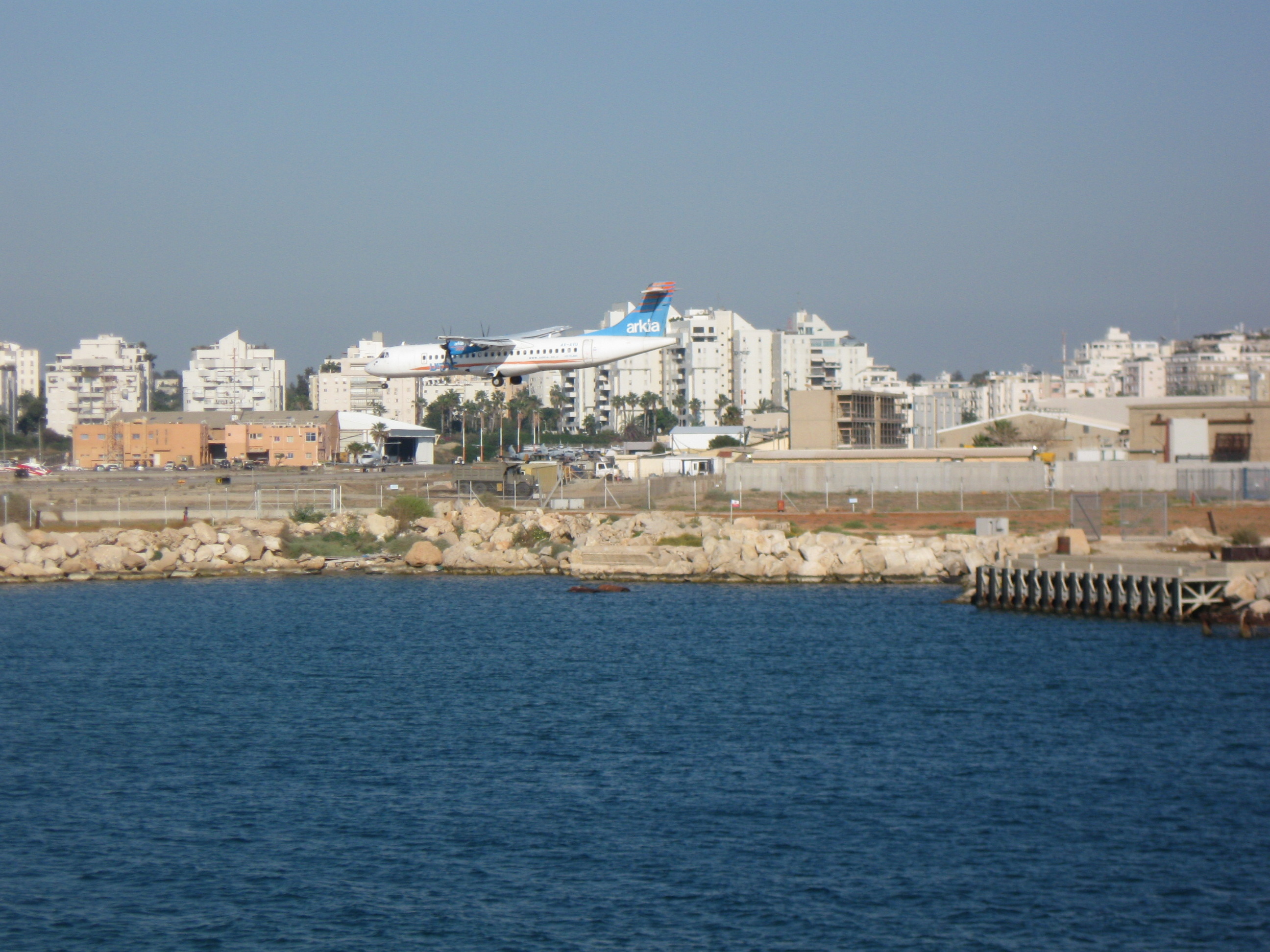
An Arkia ATR-72-500 on final approach at Sde Dov

Following the 1948 war, the Arab orchards to the east of Tel Aviv were opened for development, and the military started using the Sde Dov airport on a regular basis. The airport regained its commercial operations, initially serving domestic flights, mostly to single customers, on Piper Cub aircraft. It later expanded operations to scheduled service on larger aircraft to various parts of Israel. As a result of the land availability, an additional, north–south, runway was built with no opposition. By 1960, land in Tel Aviv became scarce, and the municipality demanded that the airport be relocated northward, so as to allow residential development in its place. However, a committee that investigated the options for such a relocation in 1961 found no feasible site in proximity to Tel Aviv and suggested that flights be moved to Lod airport (now known as Ben Gurion Airport), and that road access from Tel Aviv to Lod be improved. This option, however, was blocked by the Israel Defense Forces.

The government set up a second committee in 1968 which suggested that the old east–west runway be closed and the airport's area reduced, allowing for development to the east of the airport. They suggested that the old east–west runway be replaced by a new runway in the sea, adjacent to the beach. The old runway was closed, and a high density upper-middle income neighborhood was built to the east of the airport, although the new runway was never constructed due to the high cost involved.

As the new residential area suffered from aircraft noise, residents joined in the demand that the airport be relocated. Despite this, the number of flights to the airport increased as the newly formed Israel Airports Authority strived to reduce congestion at Ben Gurion Airport by shifting all domestic turbo-prop flights to Sde Dov. Once again, the only feasible alternative proposed at this point was to build a runway in the sea and again, the high cost of this project meant that it never happened. This was a large issue in the area during the whole of the 1980s.

=== Recent history and closure ===
The early 1990s saw a rapid rise in land values in the Tel Aviv area following the massive immigration wave from the former Soviet Union and the rapid economic growth fueled by Israel's subsequent hi-tech boom. This brought the issue of relocation back to light. Despite this, in 1997 Sde Dov was declared an international airport for private flights.

Statistics for Sde Dov Airport (not including Air Force traffic)
Year	Total Passengers	Total operations
2000	831,748	37,489
2001	879,922	38,884
2002	808,774	38,624
2003	757,817	37,674
2004	666,879	35,716
2005	662,951	34,687
2006	628,888	31,958
2007	703,649	36,427
2008	646,789	34,688
2009	661,830	31,886
2010	655,772	32,990
2011	658,741	31,821
2012	735,887	26,793

The issue remained unresolved until late 2006 when it was announced that the airport would be vacated to make way for residential redevelopment. The plan to close the airport was strongly opposed by the Tel Aviv and Eilat municipalities, and its implementation was postponed numerous times until the airport finally closed on 30 June 2019. By 31 July 2019, a Caterpillar 950M loader started the first phase of removing the runway and within days the runway was unrecognizable.

== The airport prior to closure ==
Sde Dov Airport mostly handled domestic flights within Israel, as well as general aviation activity and limited international flights, mostly to nearby Cyprus. The airport had two terminals. The IAF took up about 40% of overall movements (take-offs and landings), and used the airport as a base for some of its operations, as well as a convenient hub for military and government passenger traffic. Due to its location in the centre of Israel, air-force and civilian pilots alike crossed the airspace controlled by Sde Dov's air traffic control tower from north to south and vice versa in order to reach their destination, without landing at Sde Dov. This significantly increased the air traffic density above and around the airport, and efforts were made to keep "crossing traffic" away from the approach and departure patterns in order to minimise their effect on air traffic safety at Sde Dov. The airport had seven check-in desks and 45 aircraft stands.

== The former airport site after closure ==
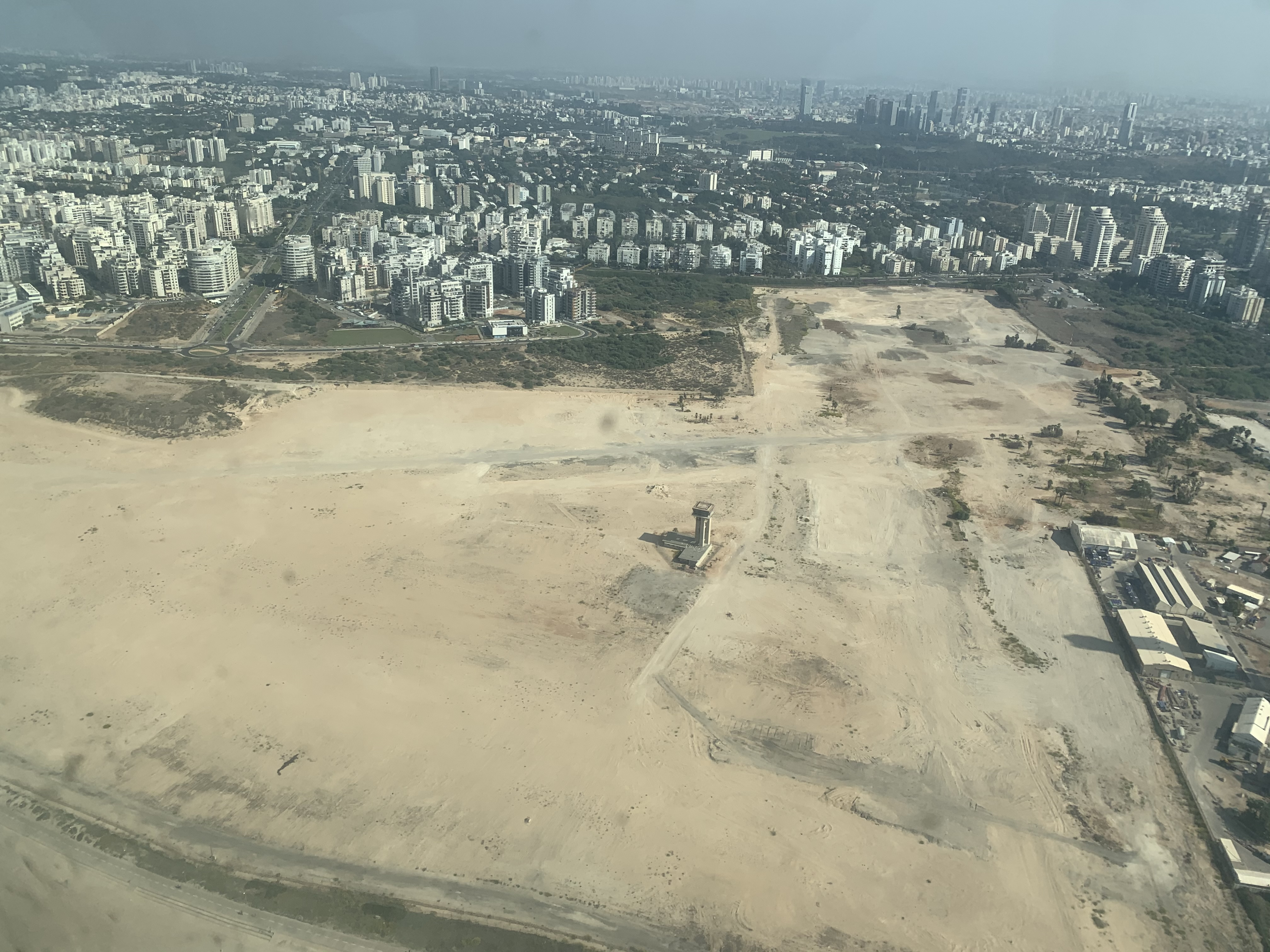
The grounds of Sde Dov Airport after it was demolished (October 2020).

In early 2020, the Israeli Defense Ministry completed demolition of the old airport structures ahead of redevelopment. The former tower was left standing and will remain as a historic preserved building. Per plans approved in 2020, the 750 dunams (0.75 km^{2}; 0.29 sq mi) site is to become host to 16,000 housing units, 35 high rise office towers and 250,000 m^{2} (2,700,000 sq ft) of hotels. As the former Eilat Airport also shut down in 2019, Israel has the opportunity to redevelop two centrally located former airport sites in growing cities going into the 2020s. Criticizing the plans for redevelopment as overly focused on luxury apartments, the Israeli newspaper Haaretz called the planned housing "premium homes that only Israel's landed gentry can buy".

== Airlines and destinations ==
As of July 2019, the airport no longer serves any traffic. Prior to its closure, both Arkia and Israir Airlines operated scheduled services out of the airport. The airport primarily served domestic flights to Haifa Airport and Eilat Airport.

== See also ==
- Meigs Field – an airport near downtown Chicago whose closure was likewise controversial
- Eilat Airport – closed the same year as Sde Dov for similar reasons
