= King Hussein International Airport =

International airport in Aqaba, Jordan

King Hussein International Airport مطار الملك الحسين الدولي
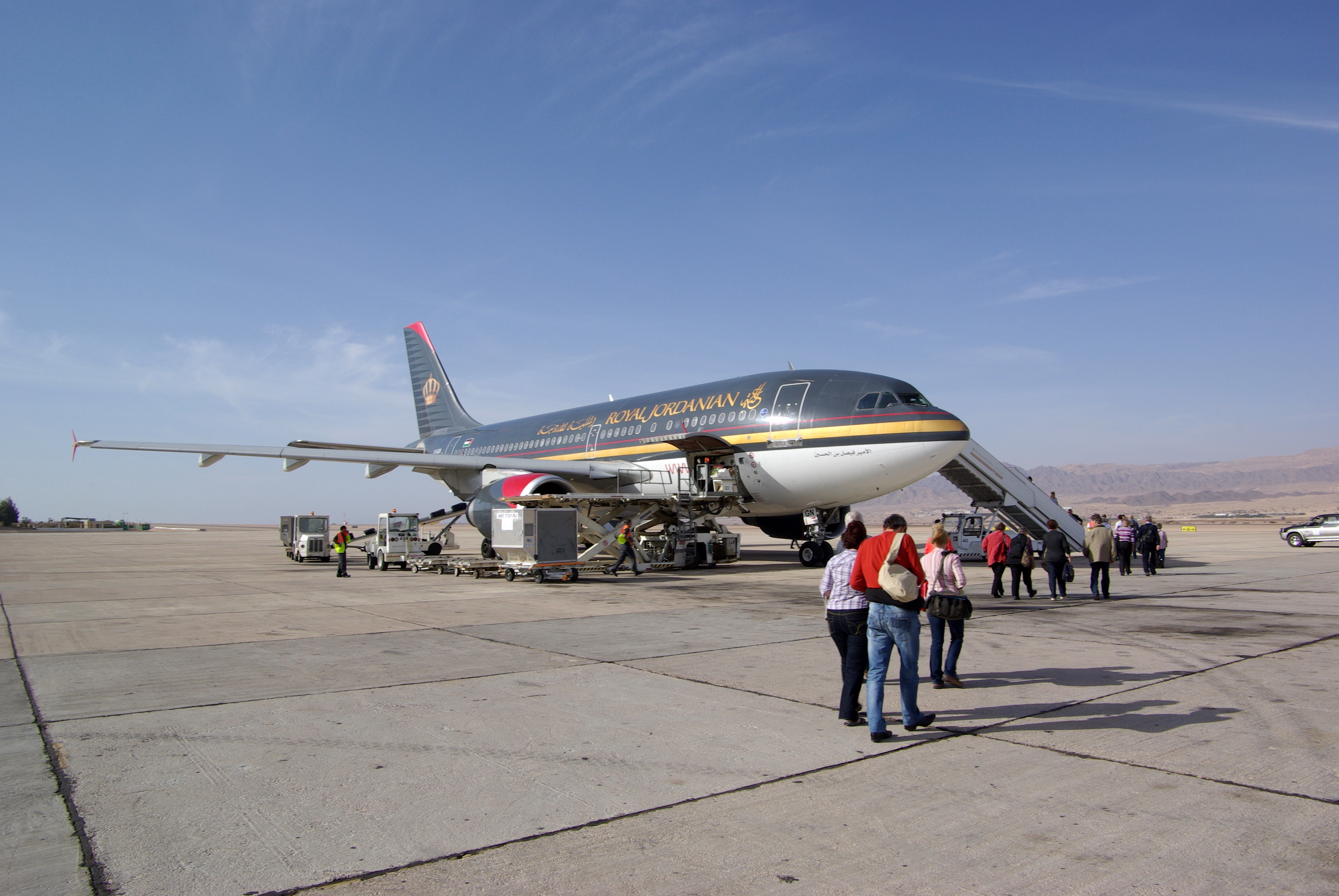
- Passengers boarding Royal Jordanian flight at King Hussein International Airport
- IATA: AQJ; ICAO: OJAQ

Summary
- Airport type: Public
- Operator: Aqaba Airports Company (AAC)
- Serves: Aqaba, Jordan
- Focus city for: Royal Jordanian
- Elevation AMSL: 173 ft (53 m)
- Coordinates: 29°36′41.83″N 35°1′5.04″E
- Website: khiaops.com

Map
- Location of airport in Jordan

Runways
Direction	Length		Surface
Direction	m	ft	Surface
01/19	3,000	9,842	Asphalt

Statistics (2023)
- Passengers: 309,000

King Hussein International Airport, Arabic: مطار الملك الحسين الدولي, (IATA: AQJ, ICAO: OJAQ), also known as Aqaba Airport, is a minor international airport located in the vicinity of a northern suburb of Aqaba, Jordan. It is the country's only civilian airport besides Amman's City Airport and Queen Alia International Airport.

== Location ==
The location of Aqaba is unusual, for within a 15 miles (24 km) radius there are three other countries, Egypt, Saudi Arabia and Israel. The airport has a single runway equipped with a category 1 instrument landing system (ILS). Thanks to its normally excellent weather conditions, the airport is rarely closed, though strong southerly winds bring sandstorms across the Red Sea from Egypt. Just across the border in Israel and nominally serving Eilat a new airport called Ramon Airport opened in 2019 despite earlier proposals to jointly develop airport infrastructure in the region following the Israel Jordan Peace Treaty of 1994.

== History ==
On 19 July 2026, the Islamic Revolutionary Guard Corps said that several American aircraft had been struck as part of a ballistic missile attack targeting the airport, resulting in "severe damage" to multiple planes. Israeli sources said that an Iranian missile had been intercepted by an American Aegis Ballistic Missile Defense System with remaining fragments landing north of Eilat, just across the Israel–Jordan border, after being shot down using Israel's Iron Dome system.

== Facilities ==
=== Infrastructure ===
A new cargo terminal covering 6,000 square metres (65,000 sq ft) and a new cargo apron measuring 220 by 600 metres (720 by 1,970 ft) opened in January 2005. There are also separate buildings for general aviation and a Royal Pavilion – King Abdullah II owns a palace along the shoreline and regularly visits. The Royal Jordanian Air Academy are also regular visitors on land-away cross country training exercises. The airport includes also buildings for the Ayla Aviation Academy, the Aero Wings for Industry's assembly plant for light planes, the Jordan Private Jets Services (JPJets)'s private jet terminal, and the Al Baddad International Group's maintenance centre.

== Airlines and destinations ==
The following airlines operate regular scheduled and charter flights at Aqaba Airport:

Airlines	Destinations
Belavia	Seasonal charter: Minsk
Royal Jordanian	Abu Dhabi, Amman–Queen Alia, Moscow–Domodedovo (resumes 20 December 2026), Riyadh
Turkish Airlines	Istanbul (suspended)

== See also ==
- List of the busiest airports in the Middle East
