= Ramon Airport =

International airport in Southern District, Israel

Ramon Airport נמל התעופה רמון
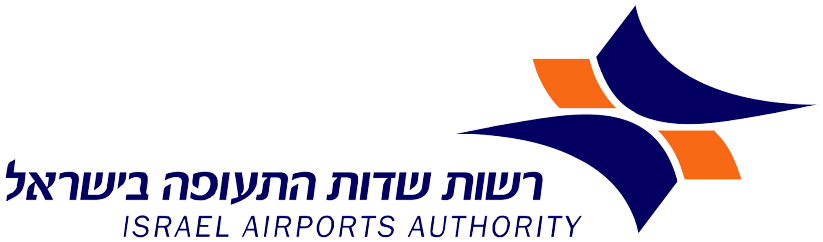

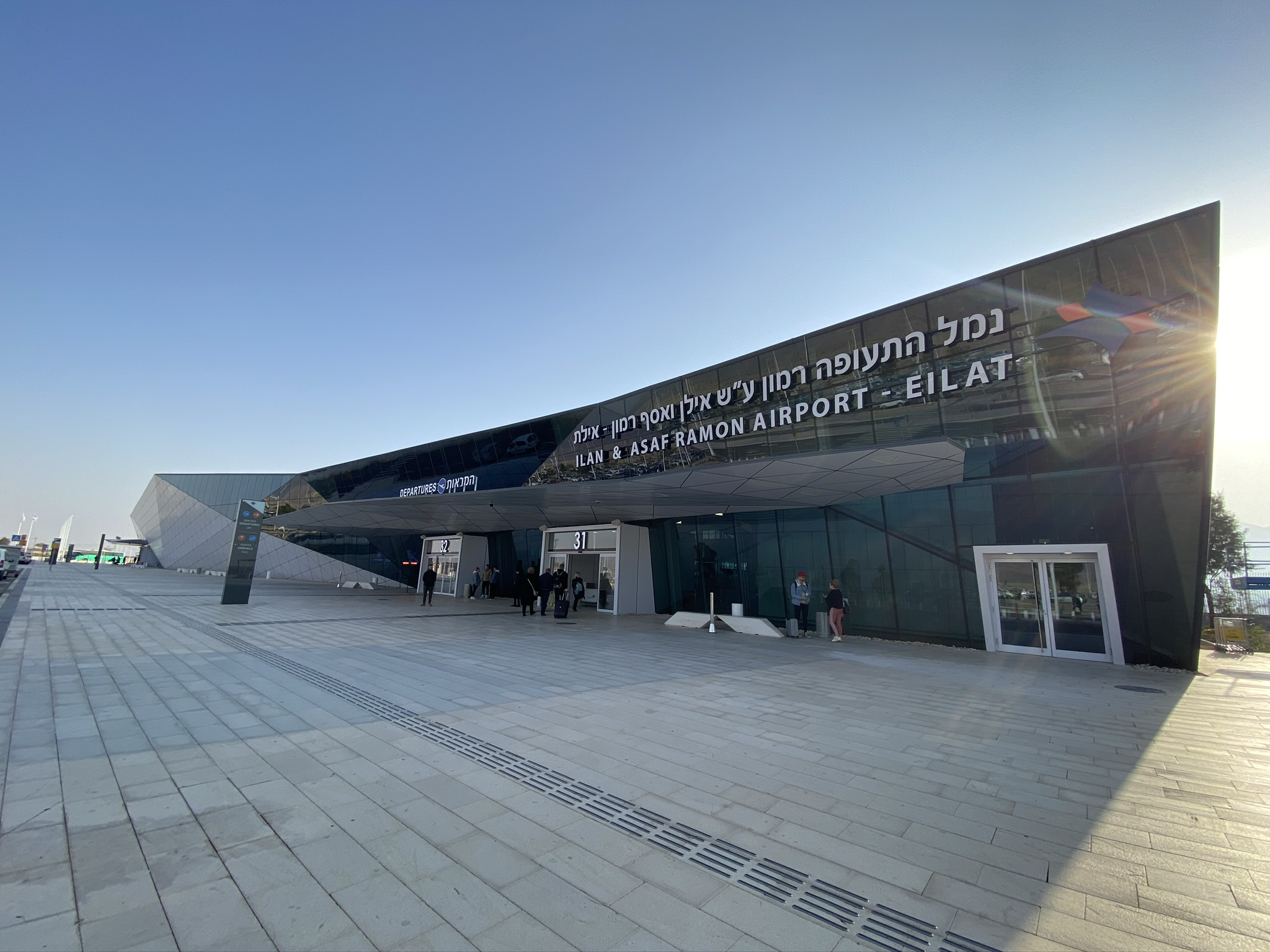
- IATA: ETM; ICAO: LLER

Summary
- Airport type: Civilian
- Operator: Israel Airports Authority
- Serves: Eilat, Israel
- Location: Southern District, Israel
- Opened: January 21, 2019 (7 years ago)
- Elevation AMSL: 288 ft (88 m)
- Coordinates: 29°43′25.3″N 35°00′41.1″E
- Website: iaa.gov.il

Map
- Location within Israel

Runways
Direction	Length		Surface
Direction	m	ft	Surface
01/19	3,600	11,811	asphalt

Ramon Airport (Hebrew: נמל התעופה רמון) (IATA: ETM, ICAO: LLER), named after Ilan and Assaf Ramon and unofficially also known as Eilat-Ramon Airport, is an international airport located in the Timna Valley in southern Israel. Ramon Airport is the second busiest in Israel (after Ben Gurion Airport) and has replaced the former Eilat Airport and Ovda Airport for civilian traffic. It also serves as the primary diversion airport in Israel.

The airport is located 18 km (11 mi) north of Eilat, next to Be'er Ora. Unlike the previous airport in Eilat, it has ample ramp space and a longer 3,600 m (11,800 ft) runway, which allows large aircraft to land and park. The airport was originally due to open in April 2017, but the opening was pushed back and the airport opened on January 21, 2019. The Irish low-cost carrier Ryanair inaugurated the first international flight service with a Boeing 737–800 from Poznan, Poland, on March 4, 2019.

The airport is designed to handle 2 million passengers annually in its initial phase, with expansion plans to accommodate up to 4.5 million passengers by 2030.

== History ==
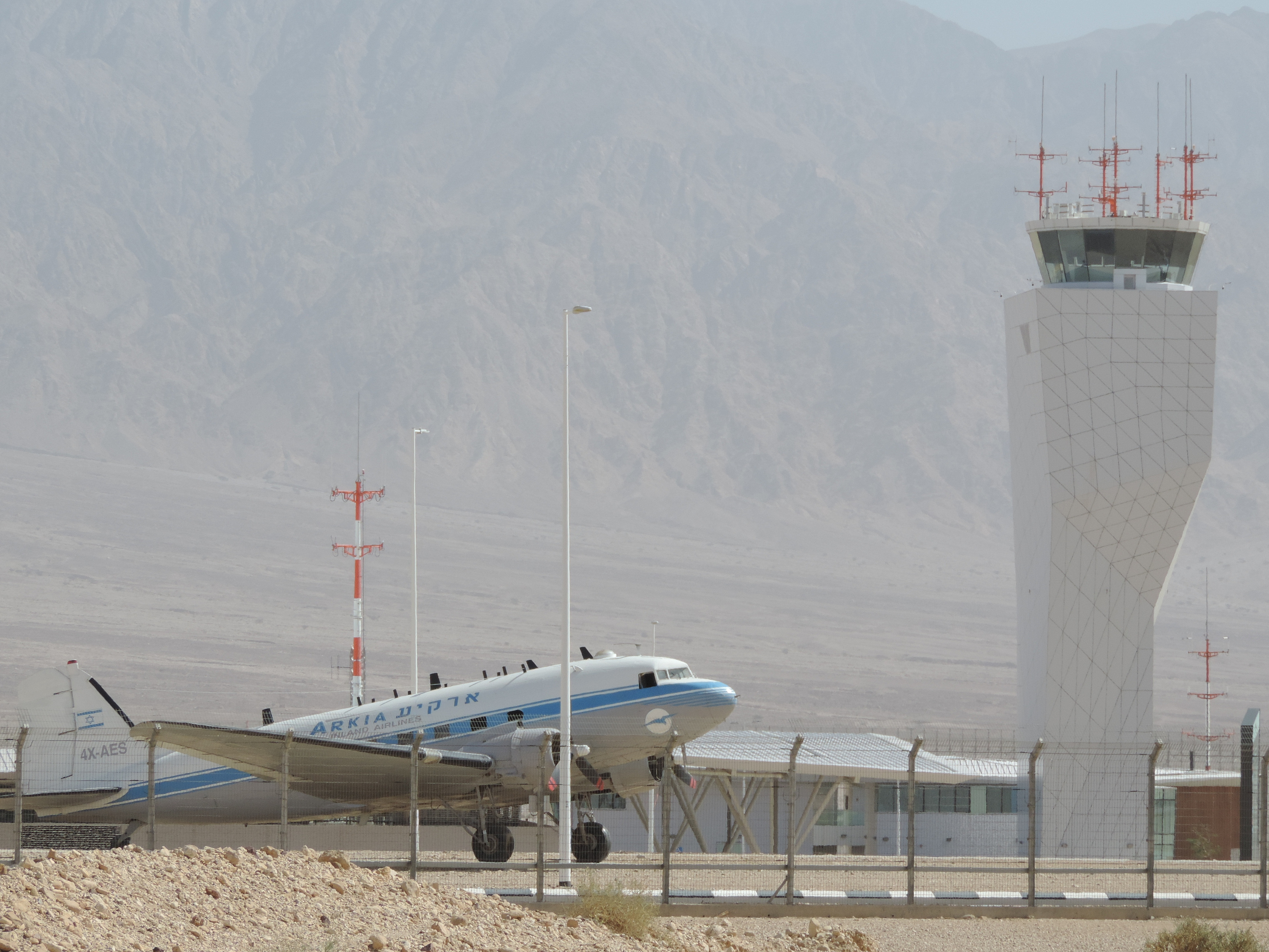
The airport's control tower

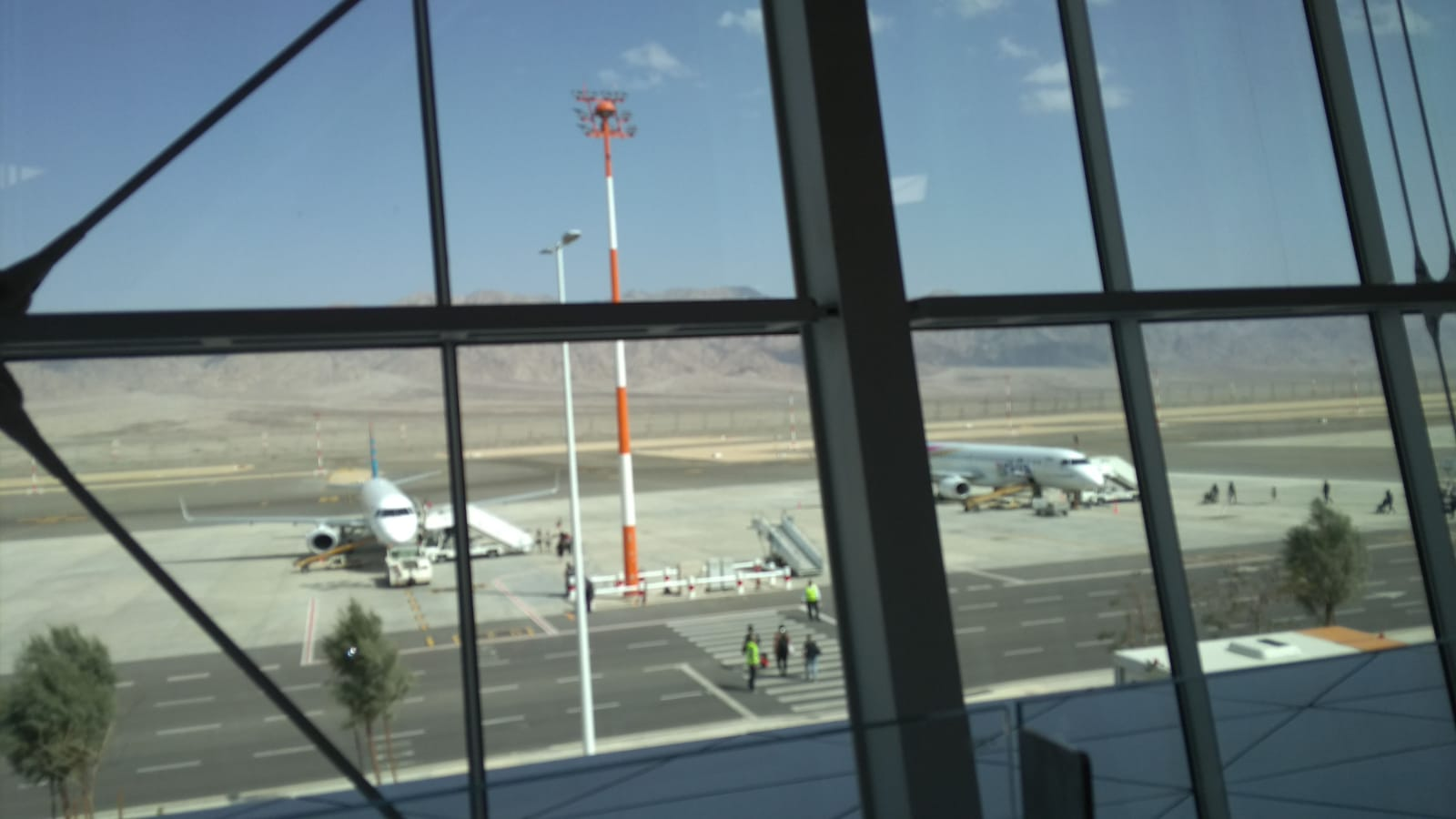
Planes at Ramon Airport

=== Background ===
Eilat Airport was established in 1949, when most of what would later be Eilat was empty. As the city developed, much of it was built around the airport. In the 1994 Peace Agreement between Israel and Jordan it was decided that operations would be transferred from Eilat Airport to Aqaba Airport in Jordan. The original plan was to rename Aqaba Airport as Aqaba–Eilat Peace International Airport. The agreement was never carried out, and an agreement between the two countries in March 1997, stipulated that domestic flights would continue to use Eilat Airport, whilst no further action to move international flights took place. Nonetheless, the construction of Ramon Airport angered Jordan, as this was seen by the Jordanian side as reneging on the promise of a joint airport made in the 1990s.

Removing the Eilat Airport from the city center was considered necessary for further development of Eilat, as it would allow, among other things, the construction of additional hotels close to the shoreline. It would also reduce noise pollution. The project is part of a larger plan to develop the city, which includes mega-projects such as moving the Port of Eilat to a location near the Jordanian border (for which removing the original airport is necessary), the Railway to Eilat, and upgrading the Arava Road.

The airport is named in memory of the first Israeli astronaut Ilan Ramon, who perished in the Space Shuttle Columbia disaster, and his son Assaf Ramon who died six years later when his F-16 fighter jet crashed in a training accident.

=== Planning and construction ===
The South District Planning and Construction Committee gave its approval for the project in 2003, and advanced planning was approved by the Israeli government in July 2010.

Construction was authorized on July 24, 2011, before advanced planning had been completed. The project's projected cost was ₪1.95 billion and it was funded partly by real estate revenue from selling the land on which the former Eilat Airport sat. The planning budget, approved on May 6, 2010, was ₪56 million. There was a plan to make the airport a build-operate-transfer (BOT) project, but the Israel Airports Authority (IAA) objected, and the government authorized it to plan and oversee the project. Despite this, it was estimated that if the IAA took on the funding completely on its own, it would go bankrupt and default on its debts. Danya Cebus was selected to build the passenger terminal. The terminal was planned to feature a duty-free shop, a feature which had not been present in Eilat Airport as Eilat Airport virtually only saw domestic flights. Mer Group was selected to provide command and control for the airport, including CCTV and perimeter protection.

In May 2013, the cornerstone was laid in a ceremony attended by government officials and members of the Ramon family. Construction began two weeks later.

The first test flight and landing in the airport took place on September 5, 2017. In January 2019, Jordan objected to Israel's opening of the airport, arguing that operation of the airport threatens the kingdom's airspace.

Ovda Airport which was built as a military airbase and is still used for that purpose had become the main airport for international flights to Southern Israel in the 2010s, as the facilities at Eilat Airport did not allow for the operation of larger and heavier planes. After Eilat Ramon Airport opened, Ovda was closed to civilian traffic.

== Facilities ==
The airport is located 18 km (11 mi) north of Eilat. Aside from Highway 90, it may also someday be reachable from the center of the country and Eilat via a proposed high-speed rail line and a light rail line that will connect it to the city. A bus terminal and a park and ride facility was built next to the airport at a cost of ₪400 million. The bus terminal will replace the Eilat Central Bus Station. When the airport opened in 2019, the new bus station was not completed, and shuttle services are available for passengers to connect from the airport to the city of Eilat. All in all, the airport will be able to handle 2 million passengers a year.

The airport features a 3,600 m (11,800 ft) runway and has eight remote-parking stands for large aircraft and nine for turboprop airplanes. The land area of the airport covers 5,500 dunams (5.5 km^{2}), and the main terminal building is 45,000 m^{2} (480,000 sq ft). It has the world's tallest anti-missile fence 26 m (85 ft) tall and 4.5 km (2.8 mi) long.

The runway is unusually long for an airport aimed to handle only two million passengers per year, which is in part due to the easily available real estate in the desert surrounding the site and also allows it to serve as a diversion airport for all types of aircraft originally scheduled to fly into Ben Gurion Airport. This avoids the numerous issues that would occur if a flight originally scheduled to fly into TLV were re-routed outside of Israel.

== Airlines and destinations ==
The following airlines operate regular scheduled and charter flights to and from Ramon Airport:

Airlines	Destinations
airHaifa	Haifa, Tel Aviv
Arkia	Tel Aviv
Israir	Tel Aviv

== Accidents and incidents ==
On 7 September 2025, the airport's passenger terminal was struck by a drone fired by the Houthis from Yemen, injuring two people.

== See also ==
- Eilat Airport – the former "city" airport serving Eilat
- Ovda Airport – a military airbase in use as Southern Israel's international airport prior to the opening of Ramon Airport
- Aqaba Airport – just 12 km (7 mi) great circle distance from Ramon Airport across the border in Jordan
- Taba Airport – across the border in Egypt, great circle distance 27 km (17 mi)
- Haifa Airport
- Railway to Eilat – proposed rail line that could serve the airport and/or reduce the need for domestic flights
- List of the busiest airports in the Middle East
