= Israel Airports Authority =

Israeli public corporation

- Hebrew: רשות שדות התעופה בישראל; Arabic: سلطة المطارات في إسرائيل
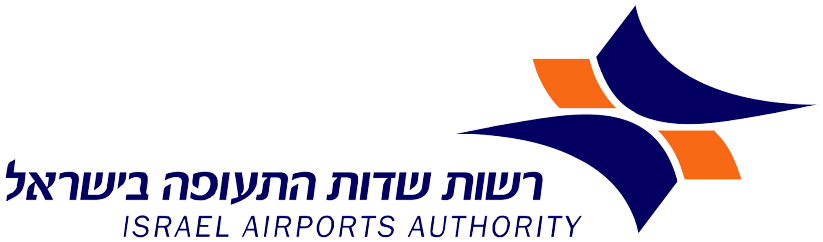
- Logo of Israel Airports Authority

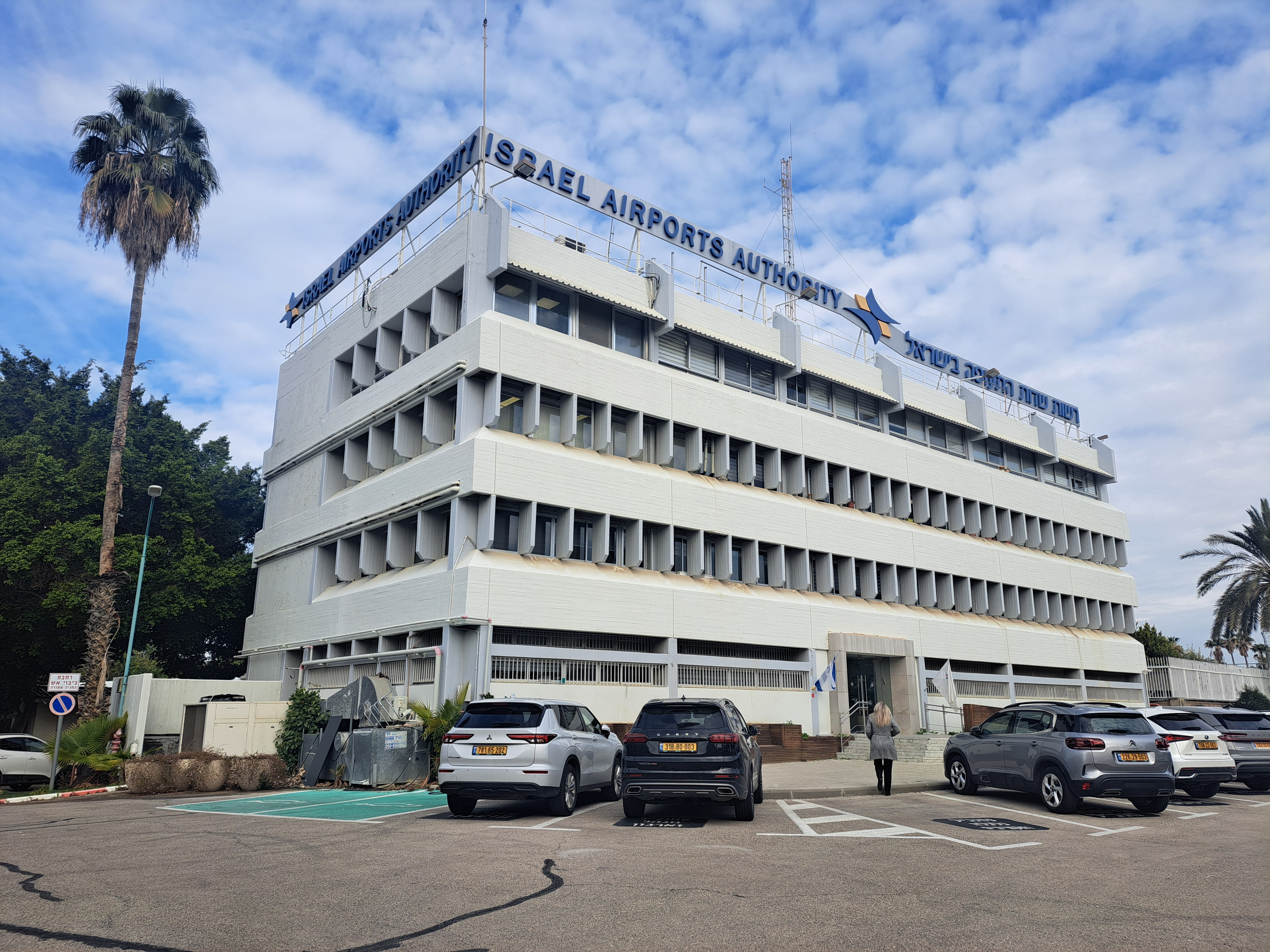
- IAA headquarters at Ben Gurion Airport

Agency overview
- Formed: 1977; 49 years ago
- Headquarters: Ben Gurion Airport, Israel
- Agency executive: Sharon Kedmi, Director-General
- Parent agency: Ministry of Transport and Road Safety
- Website: www.iaa.gov.il

The Israel Airports Authority (IAA, Hebrew: רשות שדות התעופה בישראל, Reshut Sdot HaTe'ufa BeYisra'el; Arabic: سلطة المطارات في إسرائيل) was founded in 1977 as a public corporation mandated by the Israel Airports Authority Law. The authority is responsible for the management of Israel's major civil airports and land-to-land border terminals between Israel and its neighbours (Egypt, Jordan, and the Palestinian Authority). The authority's head office is on the grounds of Ben Gurion International Airport. As of 2024, the authority is headed by the CEO Sharon Kedmi.

== Facilities ==
=== Airports ===
- Ben Gurion Airport
- Ramon Airport
- Haifa Airport
- Herzliya Airport
- Rosh Pina Airport

=== Border terminals ===
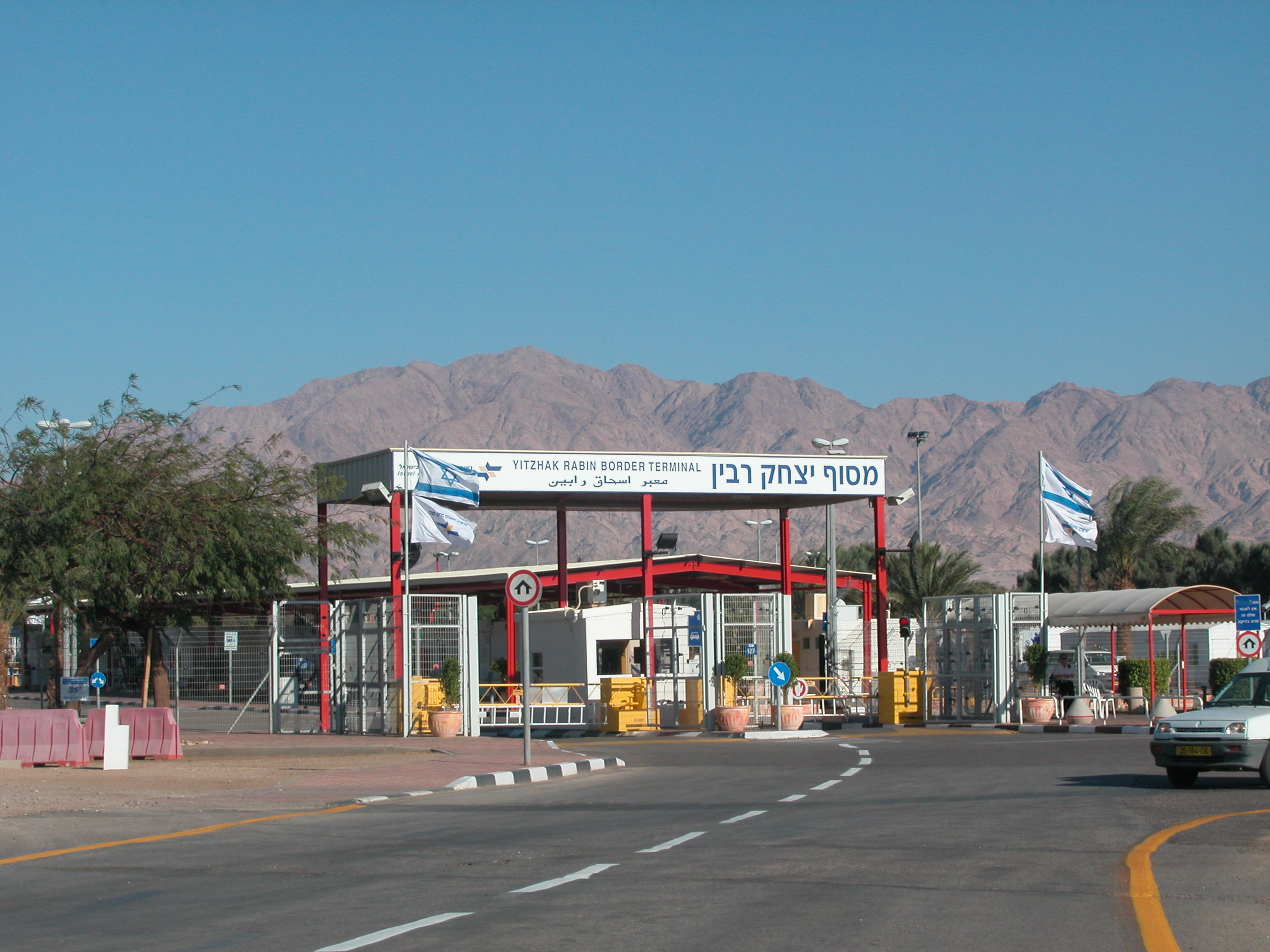
The Yitzhak Rabin Border Terminal

Egypt

- Kerem Shalom border crossing
- Nitzana Border Crossing
- Taba Border Crossing

Jordan

- Allenby Bridge
- Jordan River Crossing
- Yitzhak Rabin Crossing (aka Wadi Araba Crossing)
