= Arkia =

Israeli airline

Arkia ארקיע
IATA	ICAO	Call sign
IZ	AIZ	ARKIA
- Founded: 1949; 77 years ago (as Israel Inland Airlines)
- Operating bases: Ben Gurion Airport
- Hubs: Ramon Airport
- Fleet size: 7
- Destinations: 32
- Parent company: Jordache Enterprises (70%)
- Headquarters: Ben Gurion Airport; Tel Aviv, Israel
- Key people: Oz Berlovich (CEO)
- Employees: 420 (as of 2020)
- Website: www.arkia.co.il

Arkia (Note: Hebrew: ארקיע; lit. 'I will soar') (stylized as arkia), legally incorporated as Arkia Israeli Airlines Ltd, is an Israeli airline. It is Israel's second largest airline, operating scheduled domestic and international services, as well as charter flights to destinations in Western Europe and across the Mediterranean. Its main base and headquarters is Ben Gurion Airport, with a hub at the Ramon Airport.

As of 2020, there are 420 employees employed at Arkia.

== History ==
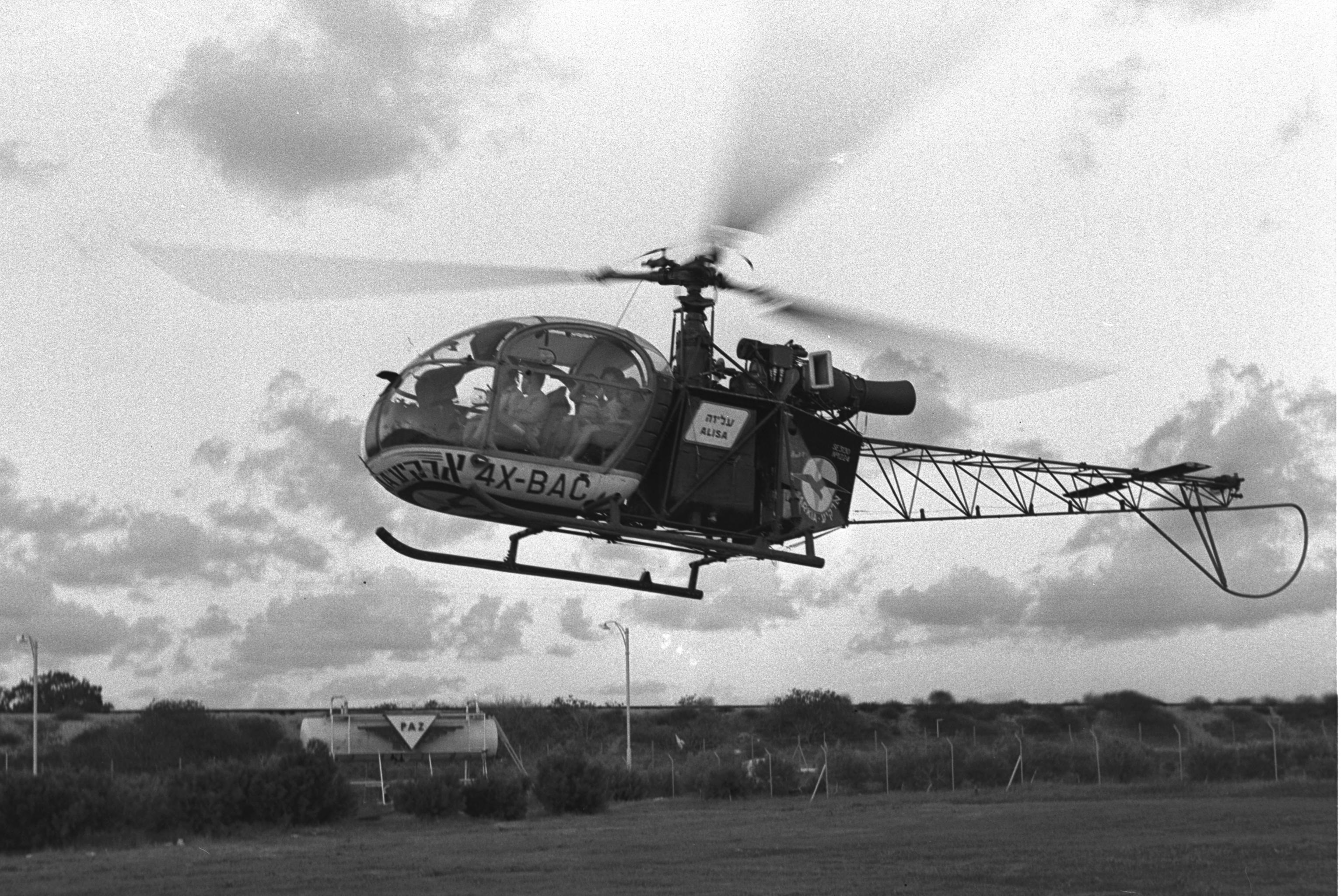
Arkia operated the first Israeli civilian helicopter service in October 1959.

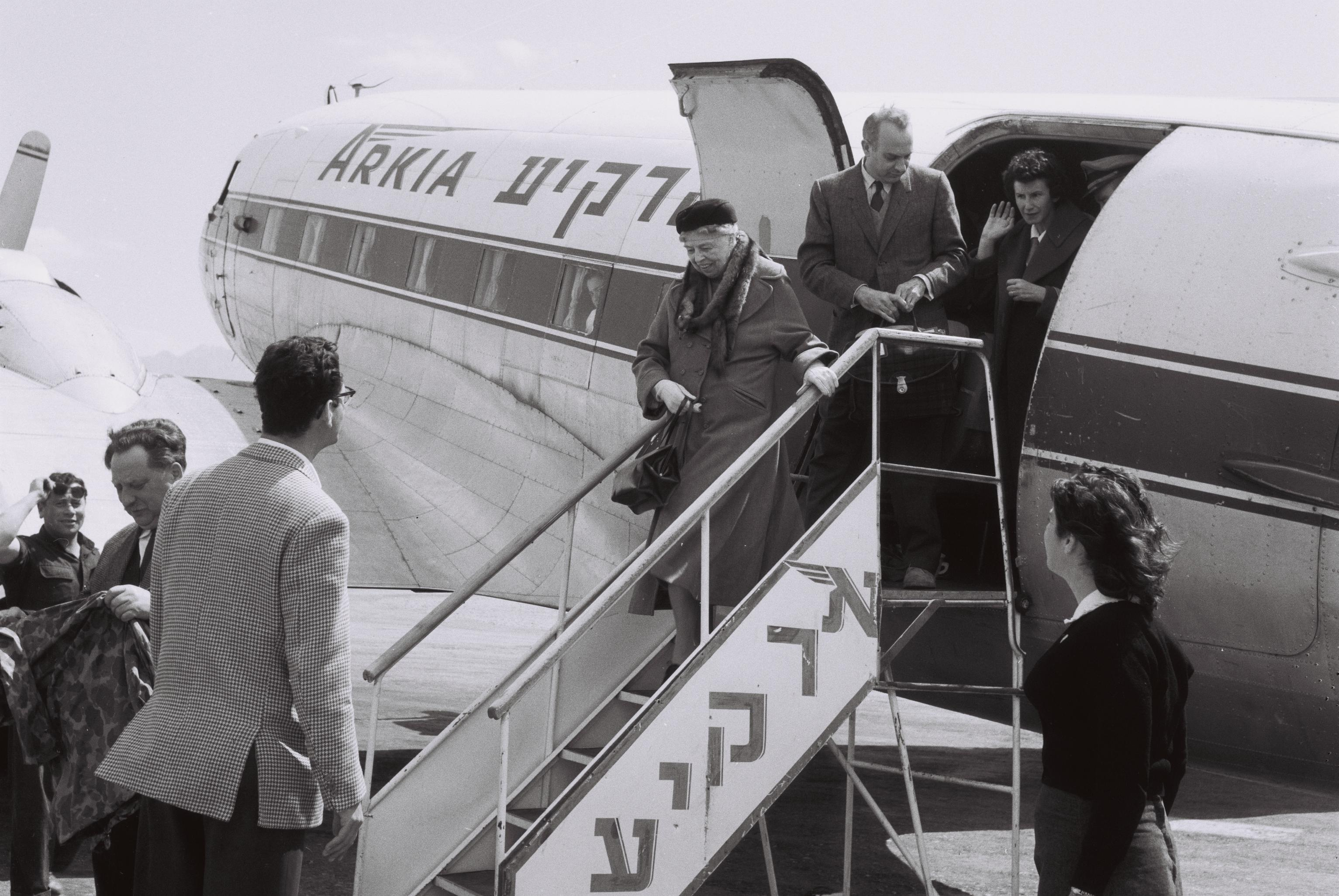
Eleanor Roosevelt arriving for a visit in Eilat on an Arkia airplane on March 26, 1959

=== Foundation and early years ===
Arkia was founded in 1949 as Israel Inland Airlines when it became clear that there was demand for a local airline to connect Tel Aviv with different regions of the reborn state of Israel, especially with Eilat, Israel's important seaport situated on the Gulf of Aqaba. Flights commenced in 1950 with de Havilland DH.89 aircraft, followed by Douglas DC-3s, to inter-connect major towns in Israel from Rosh Pinna in the North to the port of Eilat in the South. El Al held a 50% stake in the airline at this time with the Histadrut, Israel's labour federation, being the other shareholder. The airline later adopted the name Eilata Airlines - Aviron, and Arkia Israel Airlines. In its first year of service, Israel Inland Airlines carried 13,485 passengers, using a Curtis Commando.

During the 1950s, the airline continued to grow, upgrading its fleet to the larger DC-3, and operating two flights a day on the Tel Aviv-Eilat route. This allowed Arkia to have annual passenger figures of over 70,000. As Eilat continued to grow during the 1960s, so did the airline, introducing the Handley Page Dart Herald 200 turboprop aircraft to its fleet between 1967 and 1968, enabling Arkia to expand with new routes to Jerusalem, and Sharm-el-Sheikh. A subsidiary, Kanaf Arkia Airline and Aviation Services, was founded when the airline acquired 50% of the stock of Kanaf Airlines and Aviation Services, and by the end of the 1960s, scheduled flights were in operation across Israel, from Rosh Pinna in the north, to Ofira in the south.

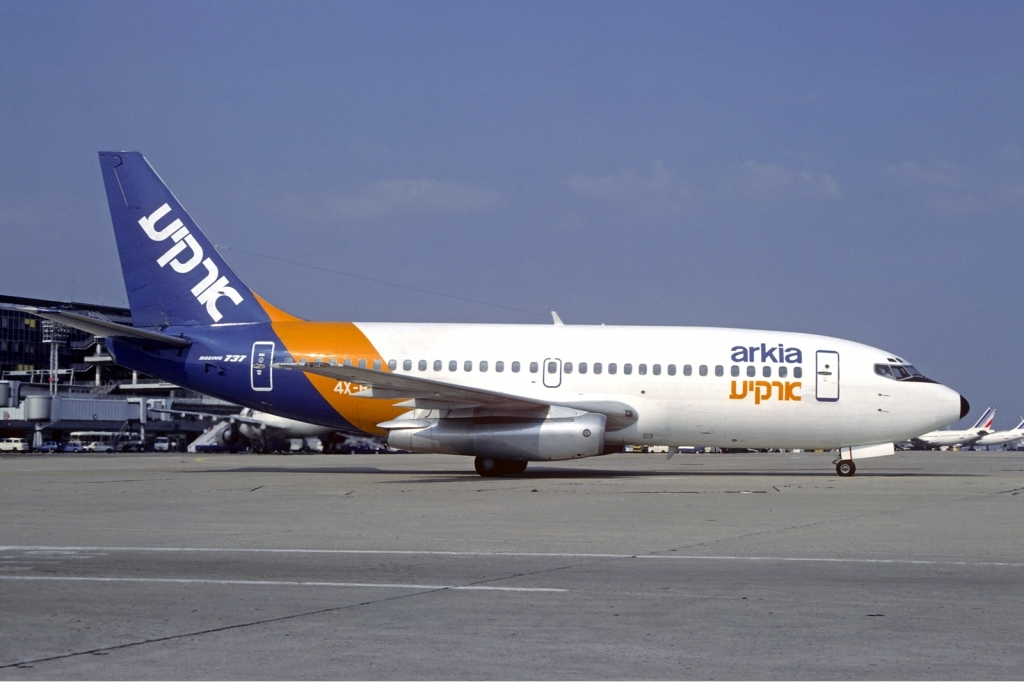
Arkia Boeing 737-200 at Orly Airport, Paris, France, 1982

In March 1980, Kanaf Arkia acquired the remaining stock of Arkia and merged the two operators. The airline grew quickly during the 1980s, moving both into the international charter market and airline maintenance.

=== Development during the 2000s ===
The airline is now owned by Kanaf-Arkia Airlines (70%) and airline employees (30%). In 2006, the Nakash brothers of Jordache Enterprises bought Knafaim's 70% share.

In February 2007, the Israeli Tourism Ministry awarded Arkia a scheduled operator's licence for flights to Dublin, and Larnaca, a destination dropped by El Al. In July 2007, it was announced that the airline planned to file for further scheduled carrier status on routes to New York City and Bangkok, currently served under charter status. Furthermore, in early 2008, after the Israeli Tourism Ministry opened up the airline market, the airline applied for scheduled carrier status for routes to Barcelona, Berlin, Moscow, and Paris. The licence for Paris was granted in February 2008, and the airline announced that both economy and business class would be offered on this route. At this time, the airline also announced that it would add two Boeing 737 aircraft to its fleet within two years, as well as four Boeing 787 Dreamliner aircraft it had on order which were to be delivered in 2012. The order for the 787 aircraft was moved to a leasing subsidiary owned by MG Aviation and leased to Norwegian Air Shuttle. The order was replaced with an order for four Airbus A330neo aircraft.

In November 2018, Arkia became the launch customer of the Airbus A321LR when it received its first aircraft of the type. In May 2024, Arkia announced it was wet-leasing a Boeing 737-700 from Ukrainian company SkyUp.

In January 2025, Arkia announced it would begin direct flights between NYC and Tel Aviv starting on 8 February 2025 using Airbus A330-900 aircraft operated by Iberojet.

In May 2025, Arkia announced it would begin a 2nd direct flight between NYC and Tel Aviv starting in June 2025 using Boeing 787-9 aircraft operated by Neos.

In January 2026, Arkia implemented an interline agreement with JetBlue, providing a connection for passengers travelling to and from Israel to have access to JetBlue's network in the U.S. and the Caribbean.

Arkia announced in July 2026 that two new weekly flights between JFK and TLV would start operating in August on 787-9 aircraft leased from Neos with increased premium seating and that one of its existing flights would be replaced starting in September with an A330-300 leased from Hi Fly.

== Destinations ==
=== Interline agreements ===
- Jetblue

== Fleet ==
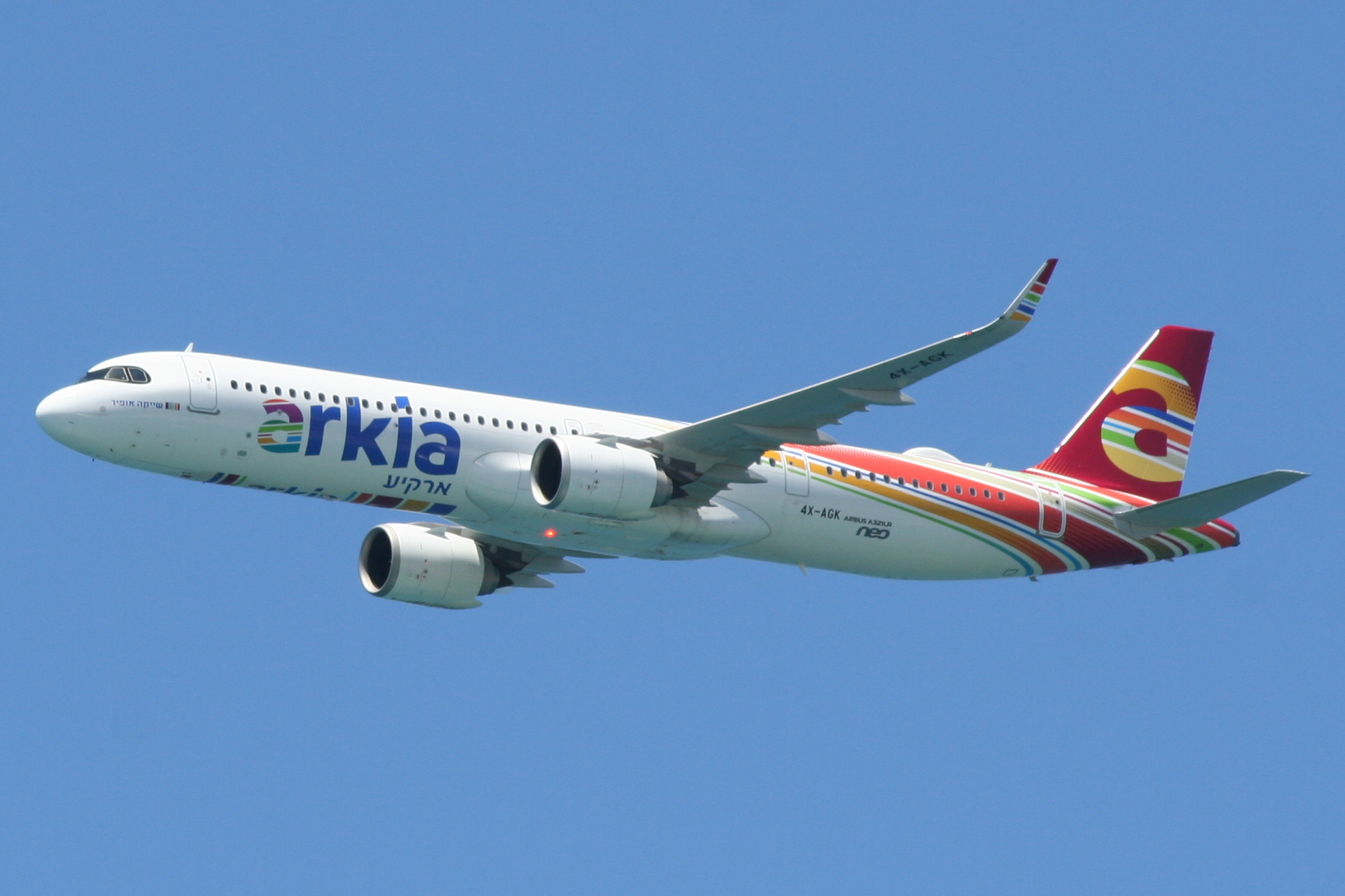
Arkia Airbus A321LR

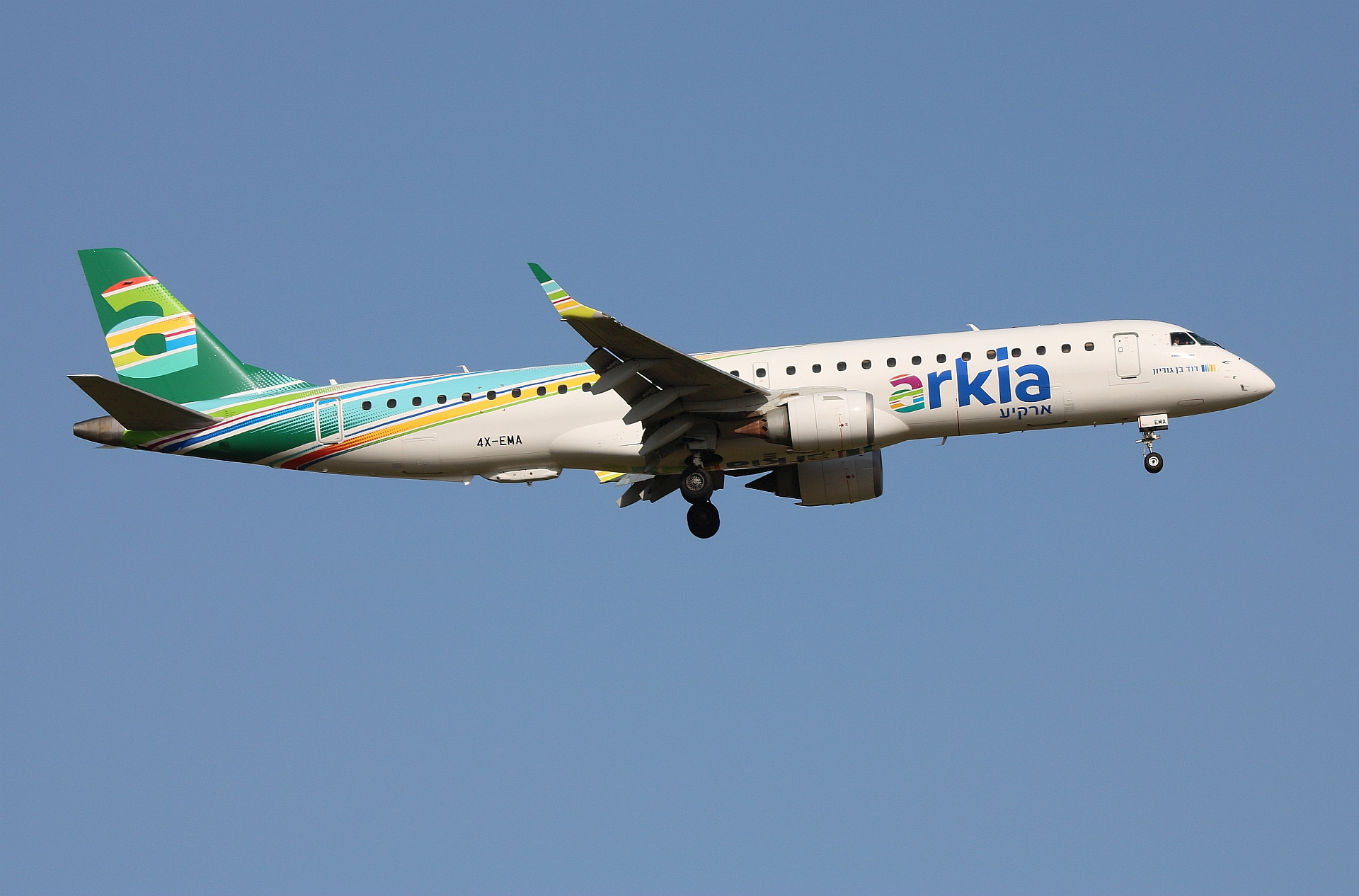
Arkia Embraer 195

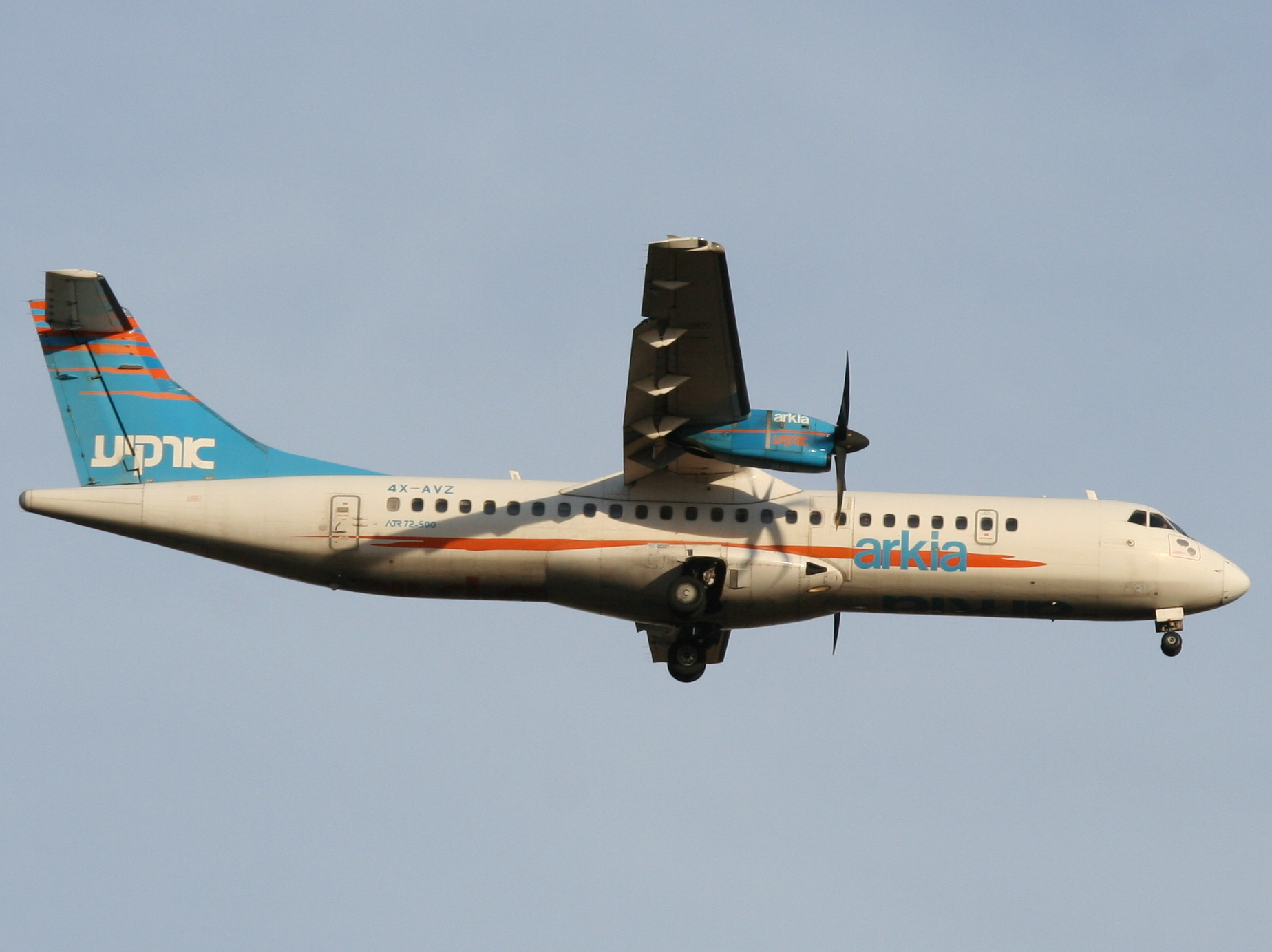
A former Arkia ATR 72-500 in an earlier livery

=== Current fleet ===
As of July 2026, Arkia operates the following aircraft:

Aircraft	In service	Orders	Passengers	Notes
Airbus A320-200	3	—	180	
Airbus A321LR	2	—	219	Launch customer.
Embraer 195	2	—	122	
Total	7	—		

=== Former fleet ===
As of August 2025, Arkia operated 1 Airbus A320, 2 Airbus A321neo and 3 Embraer 195.

Arkia Israel Airlines has also operated the following aircraft:

Aircraft	Introduced	Retired	Notes
ATR 72-500	1998	2017	
Boeing 737-200	1982	2000	
Boeing 757-200	1993	2007	
Boeing 757-300	2000	2019	
Curtiss C-46 Commando	1950	Unknown	
de Havilland Canada Dash 7	Unknown	Unknown	
Douglas DC-3	1955	Unknown	
Embraer 190	Unknown	Unknown	
Handley Page Dart Herald	1964	Unknown	
Vickers Viscount	1980	Unknown	

=== Livery ===
In May 2017, Arkia unveiled a new livery, ahead of the delivery of new aircraft, which consists of a lower-case 'a' on the vertical fin, which also features the striping effect and multicoloured stripes on the aft section and the winglets of each aircraft. The colour of the stripes and logo will vary between each aircraft.

== Incidents and accidents ==
- On 28 November, as part of al-Qaeda's 2002 Mombasa attacks, Arkia Israel Airlines Flight 582, a Boeing 757-300, was narrowly missed by two anti-aircraft missiles, fired at it shortly after take-off from Moi International Airport in Mombasa, Kenya. The plane continued onward and landed safely in Tel Aviv, Israel.
