= Eilat (disambiguation) =

Eilat is a city in Israel.

Eilat may also refer to:

== Places ==
- Eilat Mountains, mountain range in Israel
- The Gulf of Aqaba (or, Gulf of Eilat), an arm of the Red Sea
- Port of Eilat, a port facility on that gulf
- Eilat Airport, an Israeli airport located in the city of Eilat, and named for Arkia Airlines founder Yakov Hozman (Jacob Housman)
- Eilat Light, a lighthouse

== Given name ==
- Eilat Mazar (1959–2021), archaeologist

== Surname ==
- Yoni Eilat, actor and singer
- Gideon Eilat (1924–2015), Jewish rebel during the Mandate of Palestine
- Eliahu Eilat (1903–1990), Israeli diplomat and President of the Hebrew University of Jerusalem

== Other ==
- One of several ships in the Israeli navy named INS Eilat
- Eilat stone, a blue-green stone (also known as King Solomon stone) mined in the vicinity of the city of Eilat.
