= Eilat Pride =

Annual LGBT event in Eilat, Israel

Eilat Pride (Hebrew: מצעד הגאווה באילת) is an annual Lesbian, Gay, Bisexual and Transgender (LGBT) pride festival that is held in Eilat, Israel. The event was established in 2001. In 2010 there were three assaults on parade goers.

== See also ==
- Tel Aviv Pride
- LGBT rights in Israel
