= Eilat =

City in Southern Israel

Eilat אֵילַת (Hebrew) إيلات (Arabic)
- City
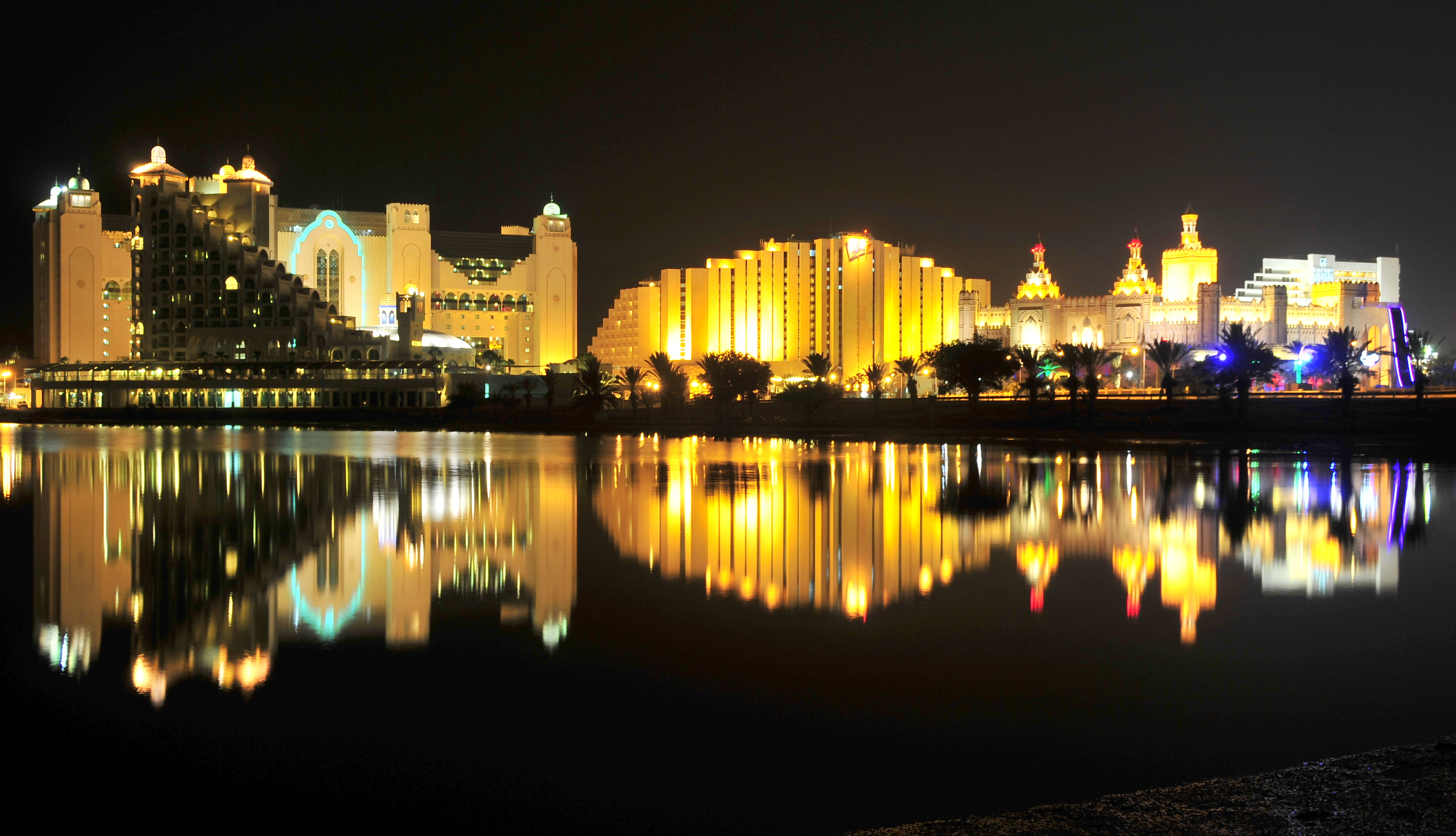
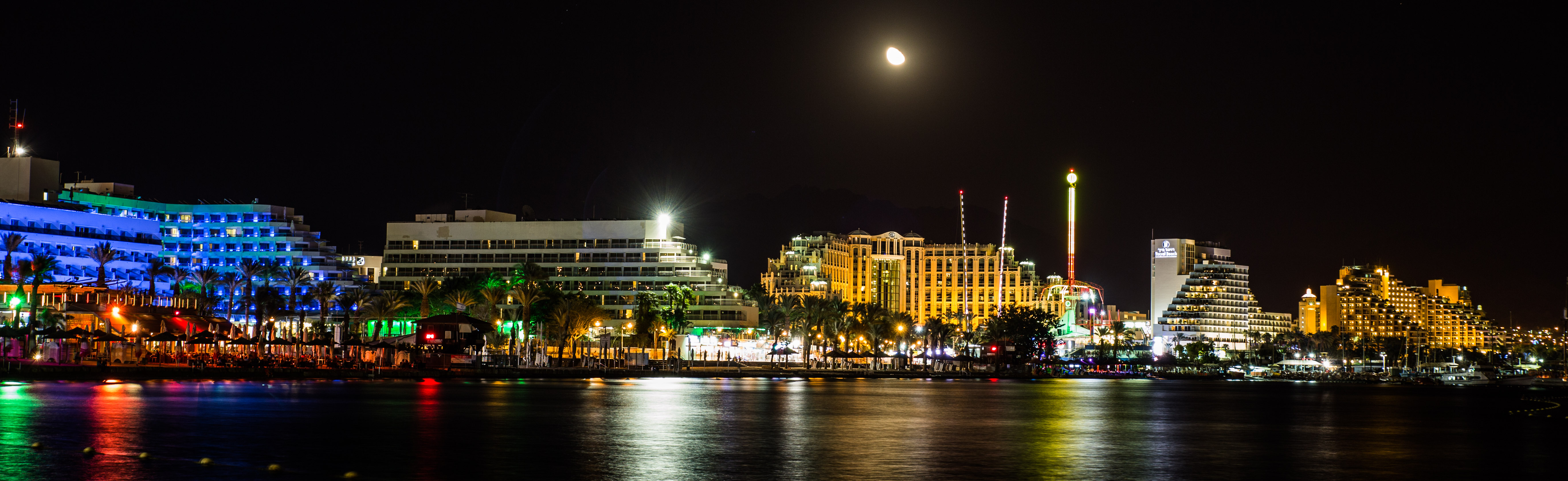
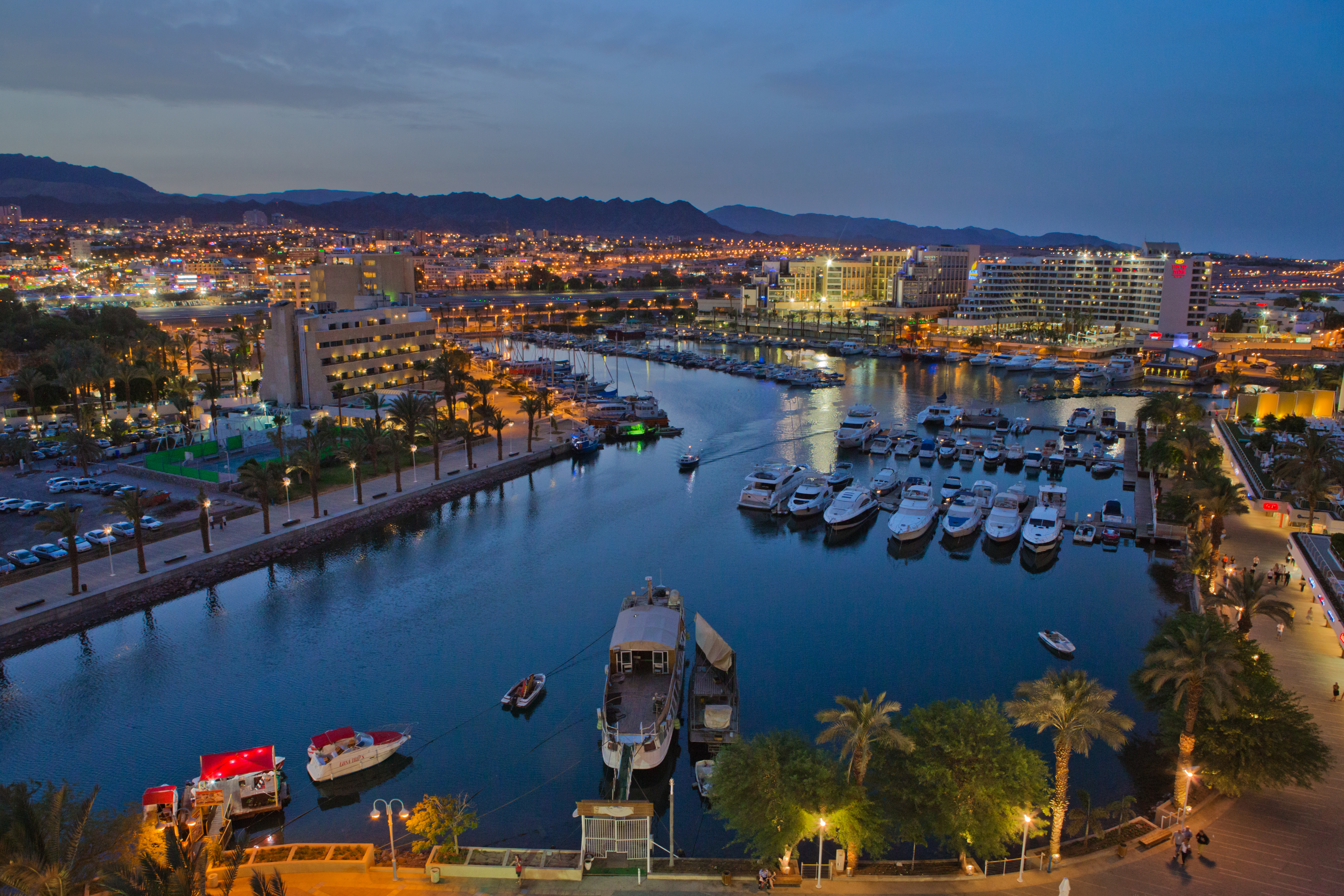
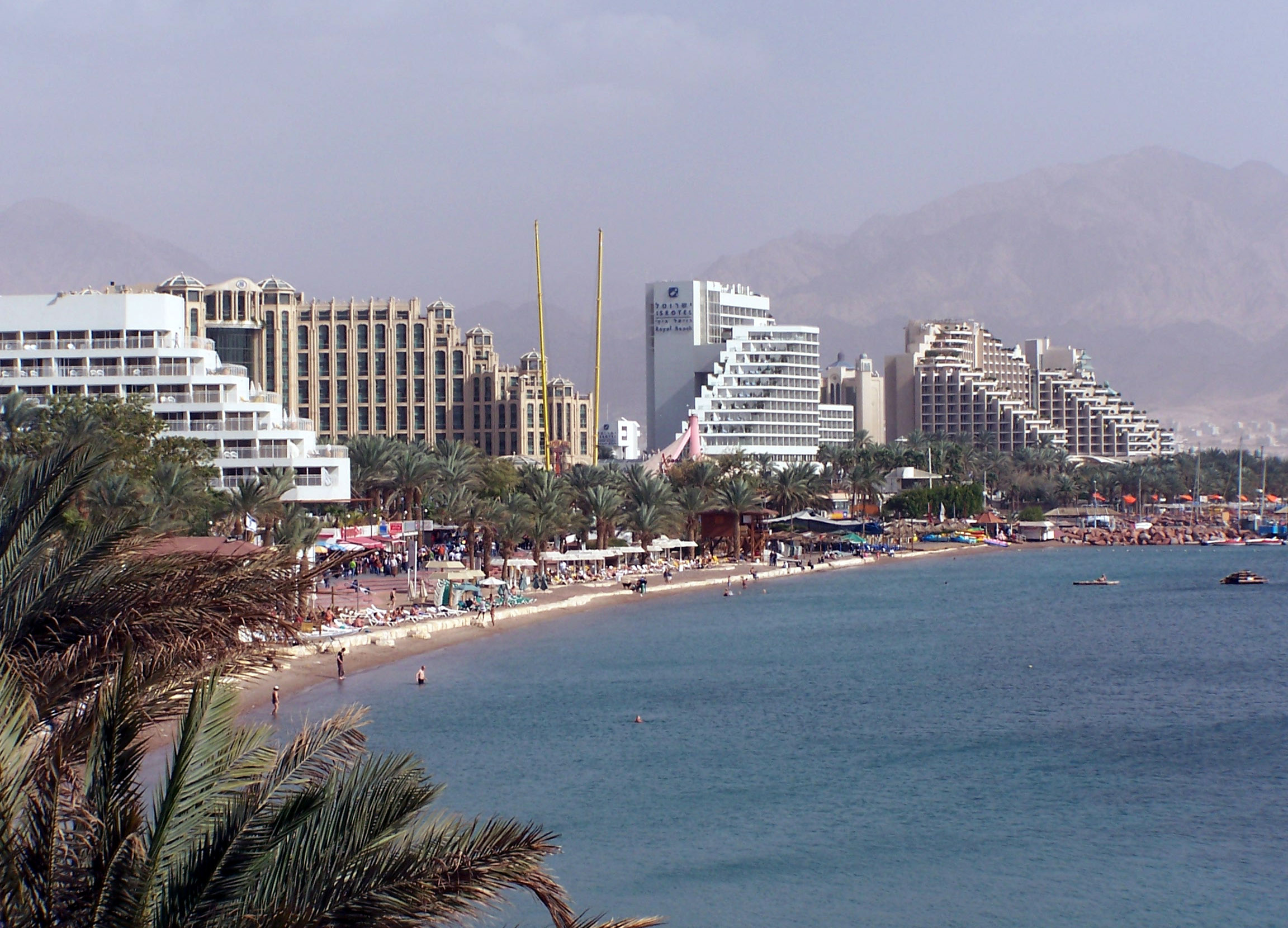
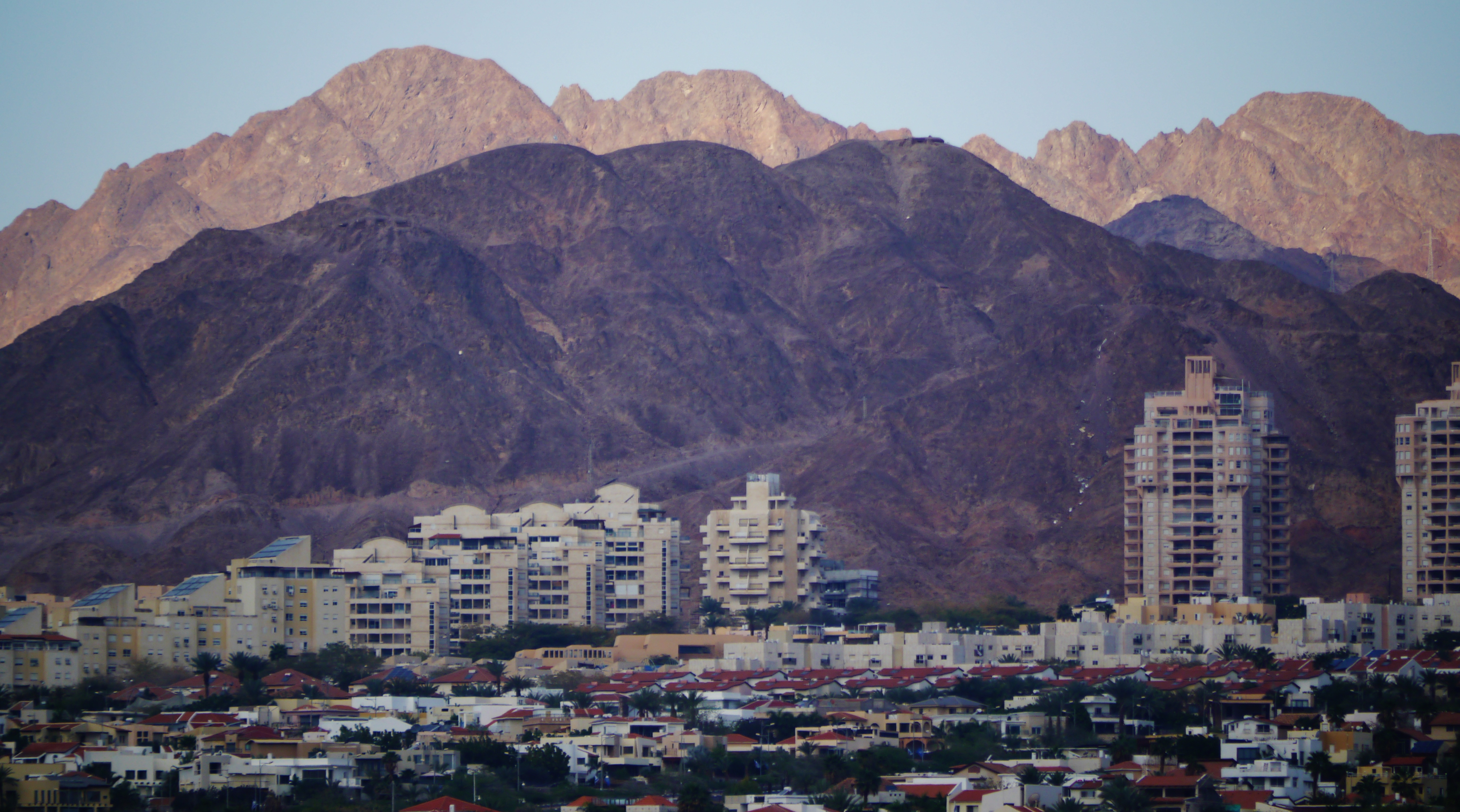
- From upper left: Eilat coastline at night (×2), evening view of Eilat marina, view of Eilat North Beach, view from the promenade to the outskirts and the surrounding mountains of Eilat.

- Flag Coat of arms
- Interactive map of Eilat
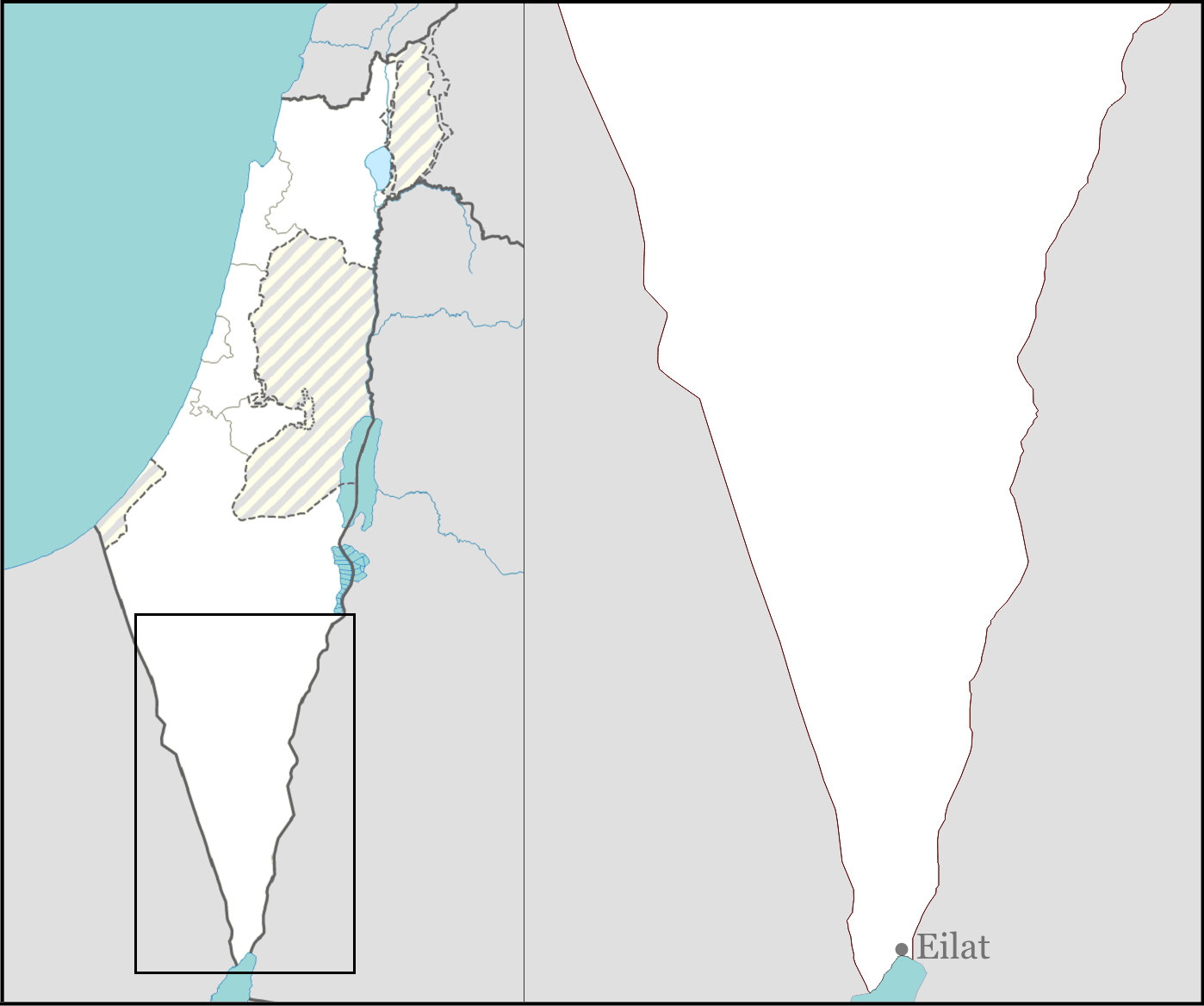
- Location within Southern Negev region of Israel Location within Israel
- Coordinates: 29°33′25″N 34°57′06″E
- Country: Israel
- District: Southern
- Subdistrict: Beersheba
- Natural Region: Arava
- Founded: 7000 BCE (earliest settlements); 1951 (Israeli city)

Government
  - Mayor: Eli Lankri

Area
  - Total: 84,789 dunams (84.789 km^{2}; 32.737 sq mi)

Population (2024)
  - Total: 56,004
  - Density: 660.51/km^{2} (1,710.7/sq mi)

Ethnicity
  - Jews: 78.6%
  - Arabs: 4.9%
  - Others: 16.5%
- Website: www.eilat.muni.il

Eilat (/eɪˈlɑːt/ ay-LAHT, UK also /eɪˈlæt/ ay-LAT; Hebrew: אֵילַת [eˈlat]; Arabic: إِيلَات, romanized: Īlāt) is Israel's southernmost city, with a population of 56,004, a port and popular resort at the northern tip of the Red Sea, on what is known in Israel as the Gulf of Eilat and in Jordan as the Gulf of Aqaba. The city is considered a tourist destination for domestic and international tourists heading to Israel.

Eilat is located at the southernmost tip of Israel, at the southern end of the Arava valley and the Negev desert, adjacent to the Egyptian resort city of Taba to the south, the Jordanian port city of Aqaba to the east, and within sight of Haql, Saudi Arabia, across the gulf to the southeast.

Eilat hosts numerous hotels, holiday resorts, and beaches. Its renowned coral reefs make it a popular destination for diving tourism, with activities such as snorkeling and scuba diving. The city's shopping centers benefit from its status as a tax-free zone. Notable attractions include the Dolphin Reef, where visitors can swim with dolphins; the Coral Beach Nature Reserve, the northernmost shallow coral reef on Earth; the Coral World Underwater Observatory, the Ice Mall, and the city's marina and sea-side promenade, home to many bars, restaurants and shops. The city also offers opportunities for hiking and exploration in nearby natural reserves like Timna Valley Park and the Eilat Mountains.

Eilat's arid desert climate and low humidity are moderated by proximity to a warm sea. Temperatures often exceed 40 °C (104 °F) in summer, and 21 °C (70 °F) in winter, while water temperatures range between 20 and 26 °C (68 and 79 °F). Eilat averages 360 sunny days a year.

== Etymology ==
The name Eilat was given to the abandoned frontier post of Umm al-Rashrāsh (Arabic: أم الرشراش) in 1949 by the Committee for the Designation of Place-Names in the Negev, referring to Elath, a biblical location thought to be located nearby in modern Jordan, possibly at Tell el-Kheleifeh. Elath was mentioned multiple times in the Hebrew Bible, notably as a station of the Exodus where King Solomon built ships. The Jordanian location of Elath was known at the time of the renaming; one committee member, Yeshayahu Press, stated "when the real Eilat finally is in our hands, our settlement will expand and reach over to there."

== Geography ==
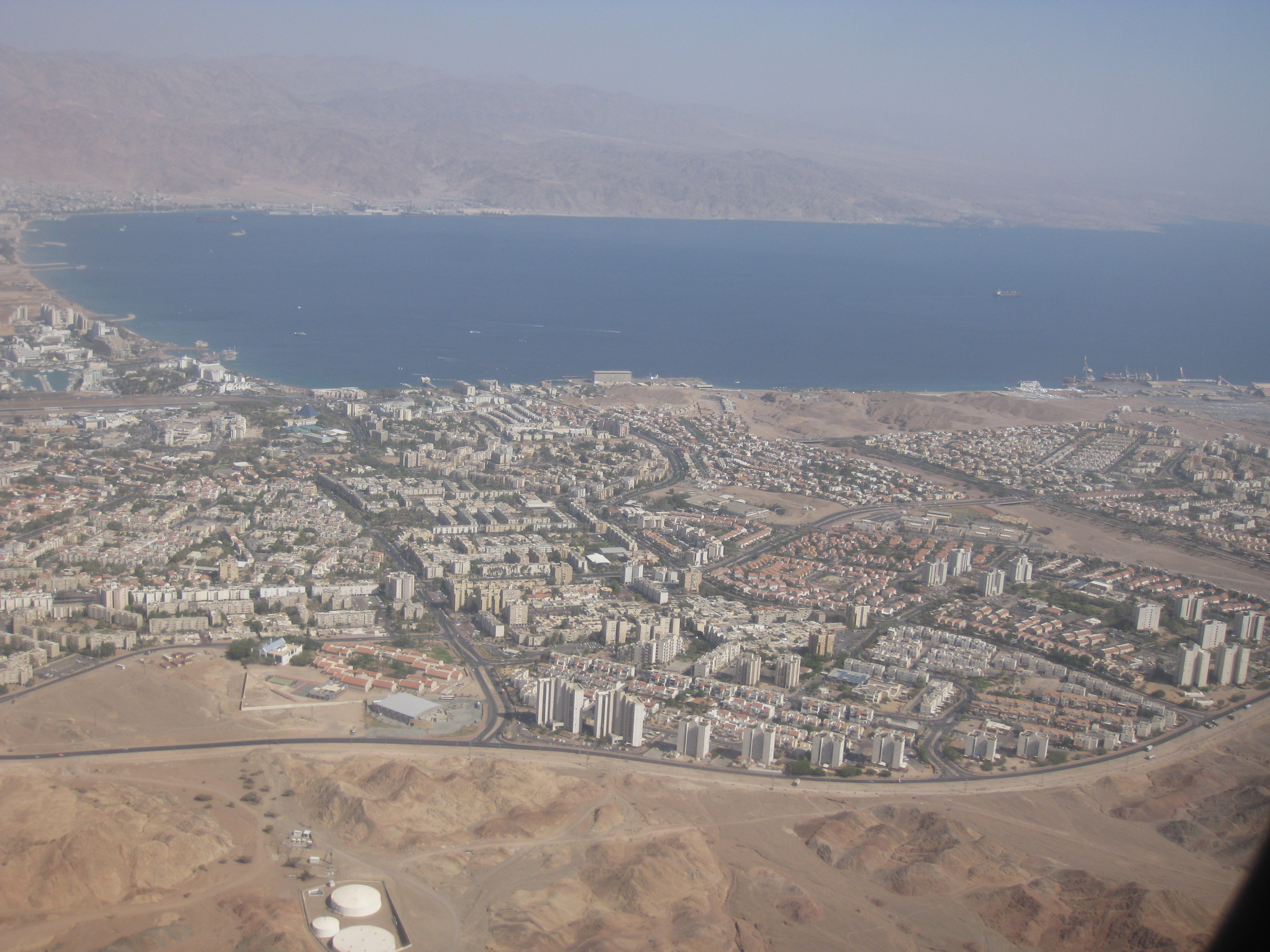
Eilat aerial view

The geology and landscape are varied: igneous and metamorphic rocks, sandstone and limestone; mountains up to 892 metres (2,927 ft) above sea level; broad valleys such as the Arava, and seashore on the Gulf of Aqaba. With an annual average rainfall of 28 millimetres (1.1 in) and summer temperatures of 40 °C (104 °F) and higher, water resources and vegetation are limited. "The main elements that influenced the region's history were the copper resources and other minerals, the ancient international roads that crossed the area, and its geopolitical and strategic position. These resulted in a settlement density that defies the environmental conditions."

== History ==
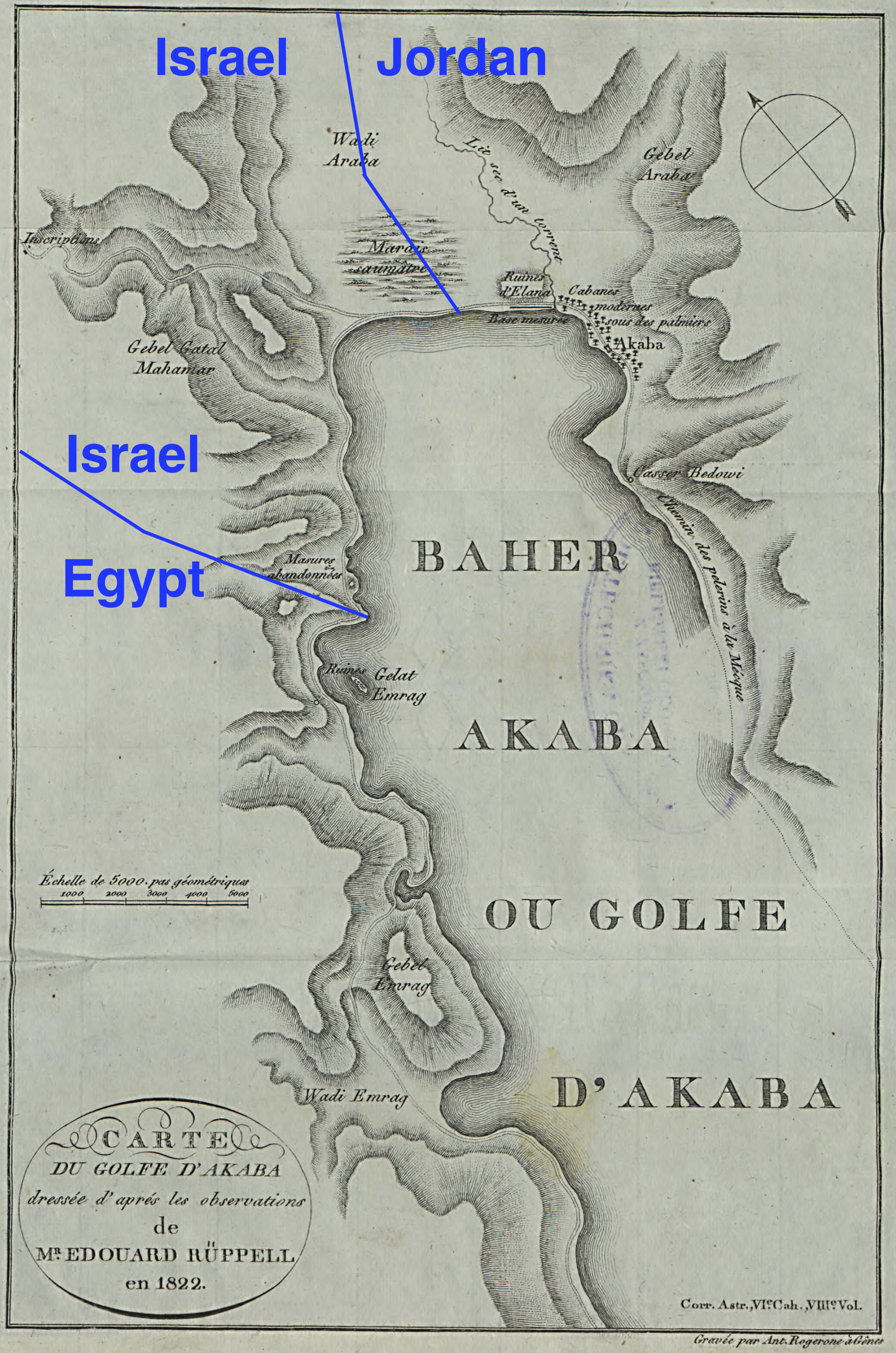
1822 (Eduard Rüppell)

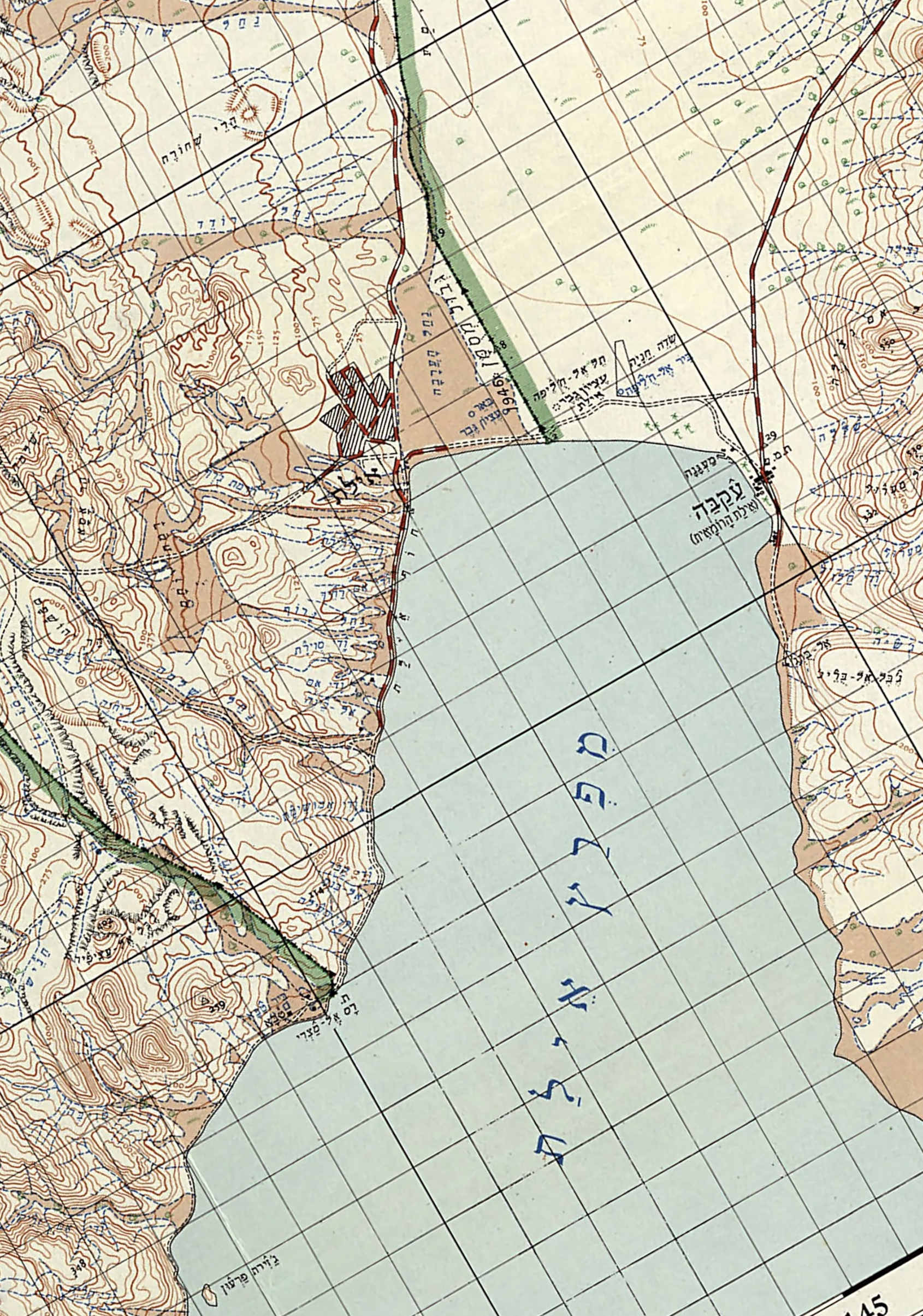
1952–58 (Survey of Israel)

On the left a map drawn by the first foreigner to explore the area in modern times with current borders overlaid; modern Eilat is located between the mountain "Gatal Mahamar" and the area labelled "marais saumâtre" (brackish marsh). On the right, an early Israeli map drawn shortly after the founding of modern Eilat.
The site of ancient Elath, later Ayla, is located midway between modern Eilat and Aqaba, Jordan, on the Jordanian side of the border; the Israeli map includes the words Hebrew: אֵילַת הרומאית, lit. 'Roman Eilat'. The mound shown on the 1822 map as "Ruines d'Elana" is today known as Tell el-Kheleifeh, speculated to be Biblical Ezion-Geber; it is shown on the Israeli map as Hebrew: עֶצְיֹן גֶּבֶר, lit. 'Ezion-Geber'. The mountain peak named "Gebel Gatal Mahamar" in 1822 is named Hebrew: הַר שְׁלֹמֹה, lit. 'Mount Solomon' in the Israeli map

=== Early history ===
Archaeological excavations uncovered impressive prehistoric (Neolithic) tombs dating to the 7th millennium BC at the western edge of Eilat, while nearby copper workings and mining operations at Timna Valley are one of the oldest on earth.

An Islamic community of 250–400 residents flourished for one or two generations in the area during the Umayyad period. It dealt in agriculture, copper mining and smelting, as well as trading with pilgrims by taking advantage of the adjacent Darb el-Hajj ('Way of the Hajj') route in the 8th century CE. There was some sporadic reuse of the abandoned site by pastoralists during the 9th. It was one of six very similar contemporary villages discovered in close vicinity, two along the northbound leg of the Darb, and three to the southwest, along the coastal road, all of them depending on the nearby port of Ayla and the Hajj road. Its remains were found and excavated in 1989, between the industrial zone at the northern edge of Eilat and nearby Kibbutz Eilot.

=== Modern city ===
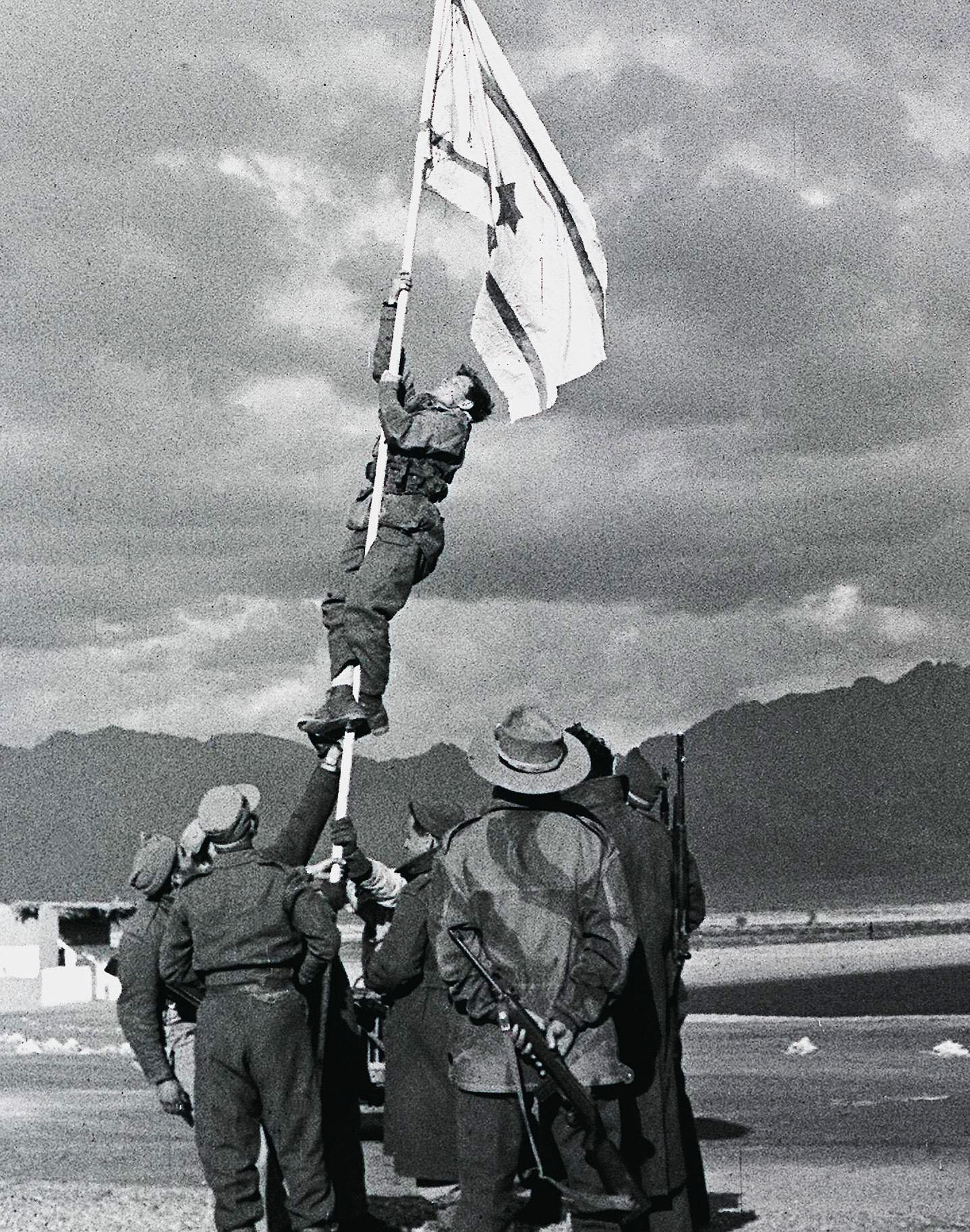
The raising of the Ink Flag, when Eilat was captured during Operation Uvda

During the British Mandate era, a British police post existed in the area, which was known as Umm Al-Rashrash. The area was designated as part of the Jewish state in the 1947 UN Partition Plan. During the 1948 Arab–Israeli War, the abandoned police post, which consisted of five clay huts, was taken without a fight on 10 March 1949, as part of Operation Uvda. This marked the end of Israel's war for independence. The memorial at the historical place of March 1949 was declared a National Heritage Site in 1994.

The town developed over the following years. Eilat Airport was built in 1949 and individual ships began arriving in the 1950s, but as there were no dedicated port facilities they unloaded their goods at sea. In the early 1950s, Eilat was a small and remote town, populated largely by port workers, soldiers, and former prisoners. The town's development accelerated in 1955, when it had a population of about 500. The Timna Copper Mines near the Timna Valley and the Port of Eilat were opened that year and concerted effort by the Israeli government to populate Eilat began, starting with Jewish immigrant families from Morocco being resettled there. Eilat began to develop rapidly after the Suez Crisis in 1956, with its tourism industry in particular starting to flourish. The Israeli Navy's Eilat naval base was founded that year. The town's population grew to 5,300 in 1961. Yoseftal Medical Center and the Eilat–Ashkelon pipeline were completed in 1968, and the population increased further, reaching 13,100 in 1972 and 18,900 in 1983.

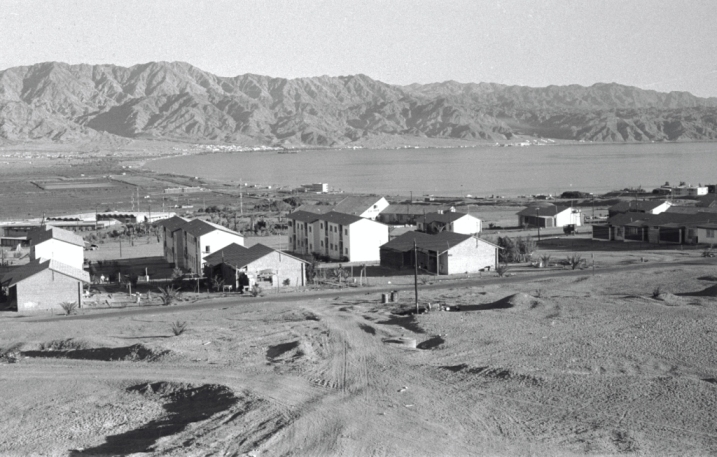
Eilat in 1963

After the 1948 Arab–Israeli War Arab countries maintained a state of hostility with Israel, blocking all land routes; Israel's access to and trade with the rest of the world was by air and sea alone. Further, Egypt denied passage through the Suez Canal to Israeli-registered ships or to any ship carrying cargo to or from Israeli ports. This made Eilat and its sea port crucial to Israel's communications, commerce and trade with Africa and Asia, and for oil imports. Without recourse to a port on the Red Sea Israel would have been unable to develop its diplomatic, cultural and trade ties beyond the Mediterranean basin and Europe. This happened in 1956 and again in 1967, when Egypt's closure of the Straits of Tiran to Israeli shipping effectively blockaded the port of Eilat. In 1956, this led to Israel's participation alongside Britain and France in the war against Egypt sparked by the Suez Crisis, while in 1967, 90% of Israeli oil passed through the Straits of Tiran. Oil tankers that were due to pass through the straits were delayed. The straits' closure was cited by Israel as an additional casus belli leading to the outbreak of the Six-Day War. Following peace treaties signed with Egypt in 1979 and Jordan in 1994, Eilat's borders with its neighbors were finally opened.

==== Israeli–Arab conflict ====
Eilat is especially defended by its own special forces unit LOTAR Eilat. It is a reservist special forces unit of the IDF trained in counter-terrorism and hostage rescue in the Eilat area, which has taken part in many counter-terrorist missions in the region since its formation in 1974. The Lotar unit is composed solely of reservists, citizens who must be Eilat residents between the ages of 20 and 60, who are on call in case of a terrorist attack on the city. It is one of only three units in the IDF authorized to free hostages on its own command. In 2007 the Eilat bakery bombing killed three civilian bakers. This was the first such attack in Eilat proper, although other terror attacks had been carried out in the area.

In 2011, terrorists infiltrated Israel across the Sinai border to execute multiple attacks on Highway 12, including a civilian bus and private car a few miles north of Eilat, in what became known as the 2011 southern Israel cross-border attacks.

In order to prevent terrorist infiltration of Israel from the Sinai, Israel has built the Egypt–Israel barrier, a steel barrier equipped with cameras, radar and motion sensors along the country's southern border. The fence was completed in January 2013.

During the Gaza war and ensuing Red Sea crisis, the port saw an 85% reduction in volumes and by 12 July 2024 the port of Eilat declared bankruptcy resulting in it seeing no economic activity or revenue for eight months.

In March 2026, Eilat was the targeted by missiles and drone attacks during the 2026 Iran war.

==== Future development plans ====
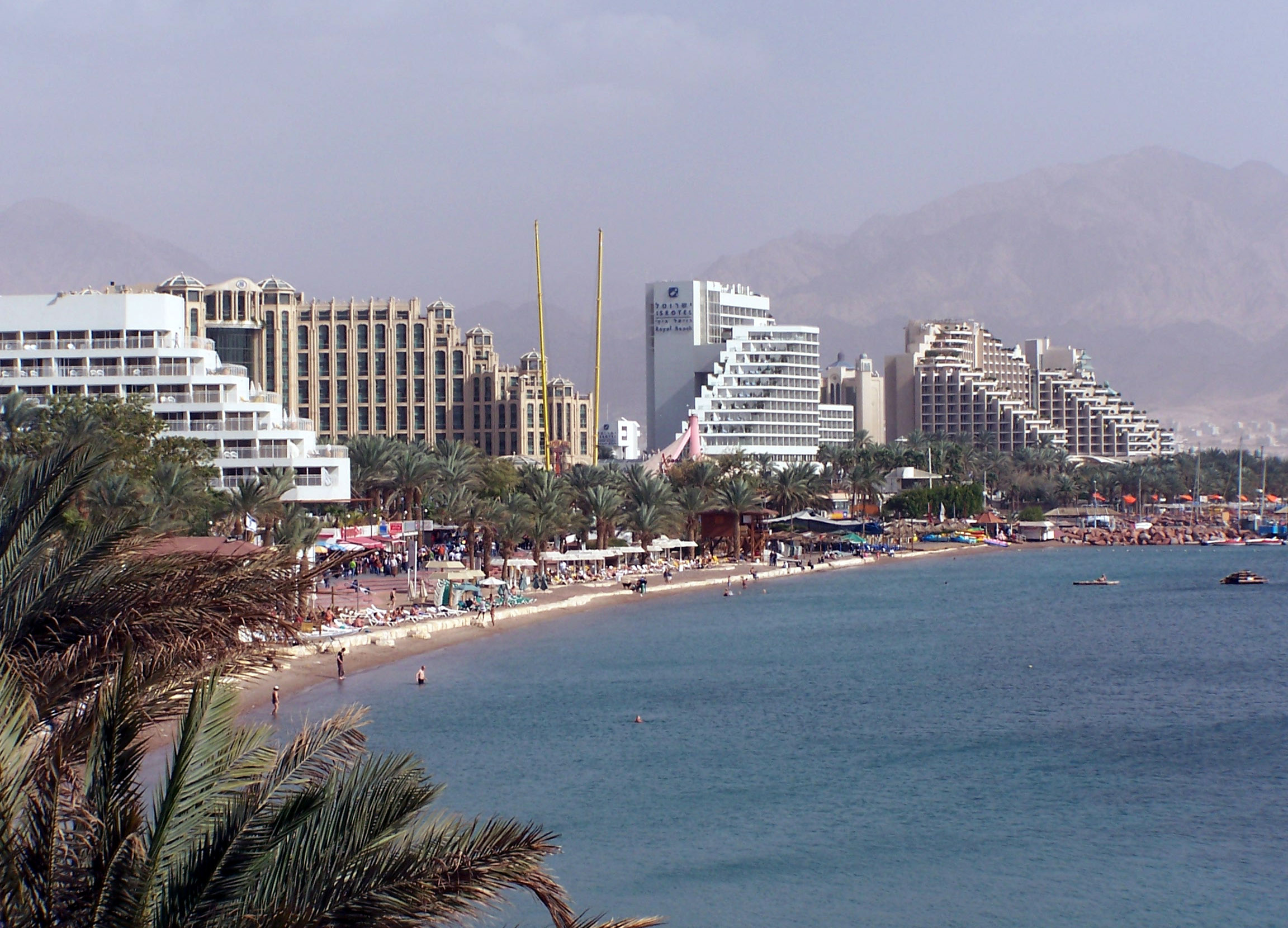
Eilat's north beach

In July 2012, Israel signed an agreement with China to cooperate in building the high-speed railway to Eilat, a railway line which will serve both passenger and freight trains. It will link Eilat with Beersheba and Tel Aviv, and will run through the Arava Valley and Nahal Zin (see Zin Desert).

The former Eilat Airport was closed on 18 March 2019 after the opening of Ramon Airport. The land occupied by the former airport is to be redeveloped. The new Ramon Airport opened in January 2019, 18 kilometres (11 miles) north of Eilat and replaced both Eilat Airport and the civilian use of Ovda Airport. Hotels and apartment buildings, containing a total of 2,080 hotel rooms and 1,000 apartments will be constructed on the site, as well as 275 dunams of public space and pedestrian paths. The plans also set aside space for the railway line and an underground railway station. The plan's goal is to create an urban continuum between the city center and North Beach, as well as tighten the links between the city's neighborhoods, which were separated by the airport.

In addition, there are plans to move the Port of Eilat and the Eilat–Ashkelon pipeline terminal to the northern part of the city, as well as to turn it into a university town of science and research, and brand it an international sports city. All these projects are part of a plan to increase Eilat's population to 150,000 people and build 35,000 hotel rooms.

In January 2026, Merkot and Minister of Energy and Infrastructure Eli Cohen announced that the water company was investing ₪ 800 million NIS to expand the capacity of the Sabcha desalination plant and double the water supply to Eilat.

== Climate ==
Eilat has a hot desert climate (Köppen: BWh) with very hot, dry summers and warm, similarly dry winters. Winters are usually between 11–23 °C (52–73 °F). Summers are usually between 26–40 °C (79–104 °F). There are relatively small coral reefs near Eilat; however, 50 years ago they were much larger. They are the only coral reefs in Israel.

Climate data for Eilat (Temperature: 1987–2010, Precipitation: 1980–2010, extremes 1987–present))
Month	Jan	Feb	Mar	Apr	May	Jun	Jul	Aug	Sep	Oct	Nov	Dec	Year
Record high °C (°F)	32.2 (90.0)	35.8 (96.4)	38.7 (101.7)	43.4 (110.1)	45.2 (113.4)	47.4 (117.3)	48.3 (118.9)	48.8 (119.8)	48.9 (120.0)	44.3 (111.7)	38.1 (100.6)	33.6 (92.5)	48.9 (120.0)
Mean maximum °C (°F)	26.3 (79.3)	29.3 (84.7)	32.8 (91.0)	38.2 (100.8)	42.1 (107.8)	43.6 (110.5)	44.1 (111.4)	43.2 (109.8)	41.9 (107.4)	39.7 (103.5)	33.4 (92.1)	28.0 (82.4)	44.1 (111.4)
Mean daily maximum °C (°F)	21.3 (70.3)	23.0 (73.4)	26.1 (79.0)	31.0 (87.8)	35.7 (96.3)	38.9 (102.0)	40.4 (104.7)	40.0 (104.0)	37.3 (99.1)	33.1 (91.6)	27.7 (81.9)	23.0 (73.4)	31.5 (88.6)
Daily mean °C (°F)	15.8 (60.4)	17.4 (63.3)	20.5 (68.9)	24.7 (76.5)	29.1 (84.4)	32.0 (89.6)	33.8 (92.8)	33.7 (92.7)	31.3 (88.3)	27.4 (81.3)	22.0 (71.6)	17.1 (62.8)	25.4 (77.7)
Mean daily minimum °C (°F)	10.4 (50.7)	11.8 (53.2)	14.6 (58.3)	18.4 (65.1)	22.5 (72.5)	25.2 (77.4)	27.3 (81.1)	27.4 (81.3)	25.2 (77.4)	21.8 (71.2)	16.3 (61.3)	11.9 (53.4)	19.4 (66.9)
Mean minimum °C (°F)	5.9 (42.6)	7.4 (45.3)	10.1 (50.2)	13.4 (56.1)	17.7 (63.9)	21.5 (70.7)	24.8 (76.6)	24.8 (76.6)	22.0 (71.6)	17.4 (63.3)	11.5 (52.7)	7.5 (45.5)	5.9 (42.6)
Record low °C (°F)	1.2 (34.2)	0.9 (33.6)	3.0 (37.4)	8.4 (47.1)	12.1 (53.8)	18.5 (65.3)	20.0 (68.0)	19.4 (66.9)	18.6 (65.5)	9.2 (48.6)	5.3 (41.5)	2.5 (36.5)	0.9 (33.6)
Average rainfall mm (inches)	4 (0.2)	3 (0.1)	3 (0.1)	2 (0.1)	1 (0.0)	0 (0)	0 (0)	0 (0)	0 (0)	4 (0.2)	2 (0.1)	5 (0.2)	24 (1)
Average rainy days (≥ 0.1 mm)	2.1	1.8	1.6	0.9	0.7	0	0	0	0	0.7	0.8	1.9	10.5
Average relative humidity (%)	32	28	25	19	16	15	17	18	23	27	29	33	24
Mean monthly sunshine hours	229.4	237.3	251.1	273	319.3	324	347.2	347.2	291	282.1	246	217	3,364.6
Source: Israel Meteorological Service

Eilat mean sea temperature
Jan	Feb	Mar	Apr	May	Jun	Jul	Aug	Sep	Oct	Nov	Dec
22 °C (72 °F)	21 °C (70 °F)	21 °C (70 °F)	23 °C (73 °F)	25 °C (77 °F)	26 °C (79 °F)	28 °C (82 °F)	28 °C (82 °F)	28 °C (82 °F)	27 °C (81 °F)	25 °C (77 °F)	23 °C (73 °F)

== Demographics ==
Historical population
Year	Pop.	±%
1955	500	—
1961	5,300	+960.0%
1972	13,100	+147.2%
1983	18,900	+44.3%
1995	32,500	+72.0%
2008	47,300	+45.5%
2017	50,724	+7.2%
2022	55,213	+8.8%
2024	56,004	+1.4%
Source: CBS

The overwhelming majority of Eilat's population are Jews. Arabs constitute about 4% of the population. Eilat's population includes a large number of foreign workers, estimated at over 10,000 working as caregivers, hotel workers and in the construction trades. Eilat also has a growing Israeli Arab population, as well as many affluent Jordanians and Egyptians who visit in the summer months.

In 2007, over 200 Sudanese refugees from Egypt who arrived in Israel illegally on foot were given work and allowed to stay in Eilat.

== Education ==
The educational system of Eilat accommodates more than 9,000 children in eight day-care centers, 67 pre-kindergartens and kindergartens, 10 elementary schools, and 3 six-year high schools. Also, there are some special-education schools and religious schools. Ben Gurion University of the Negev maintains a campus in Eilat. The Eilat branch has 1,100 students, about 75 percent from outside the city. The Hebrew University of Jerusalem also maintains a campus in Eilat. In 2010, a new student dormitory was funded and built by the Jewish Federation of Toronto, the Rashi Foundation, Ben-Gurion University of the Negev and the municipality of Eilat. The SPNI's Eilat Field School on the outskirts of Eilat offers special hiking tours that focus on desert ecology, the Red Sea, bird migration and other aspects of Eilat's flora and fauna. The Hesder Yeshiva Ayelet Hashachar, is based in Eilat, established in 1997.

== Healthcare ==
Yoseftal Medical Center, established in 1968, is Israel's southernmost hospital, and the only hospital covering the southern Negev. With 65 beds, the hospital is Israel's smallest. Special services geared to the Red Sea region are a hyperbaric chamber to treat victims of diving accidents and kidney dialysis facilities open to vacationing tourists.

== Transportation ==
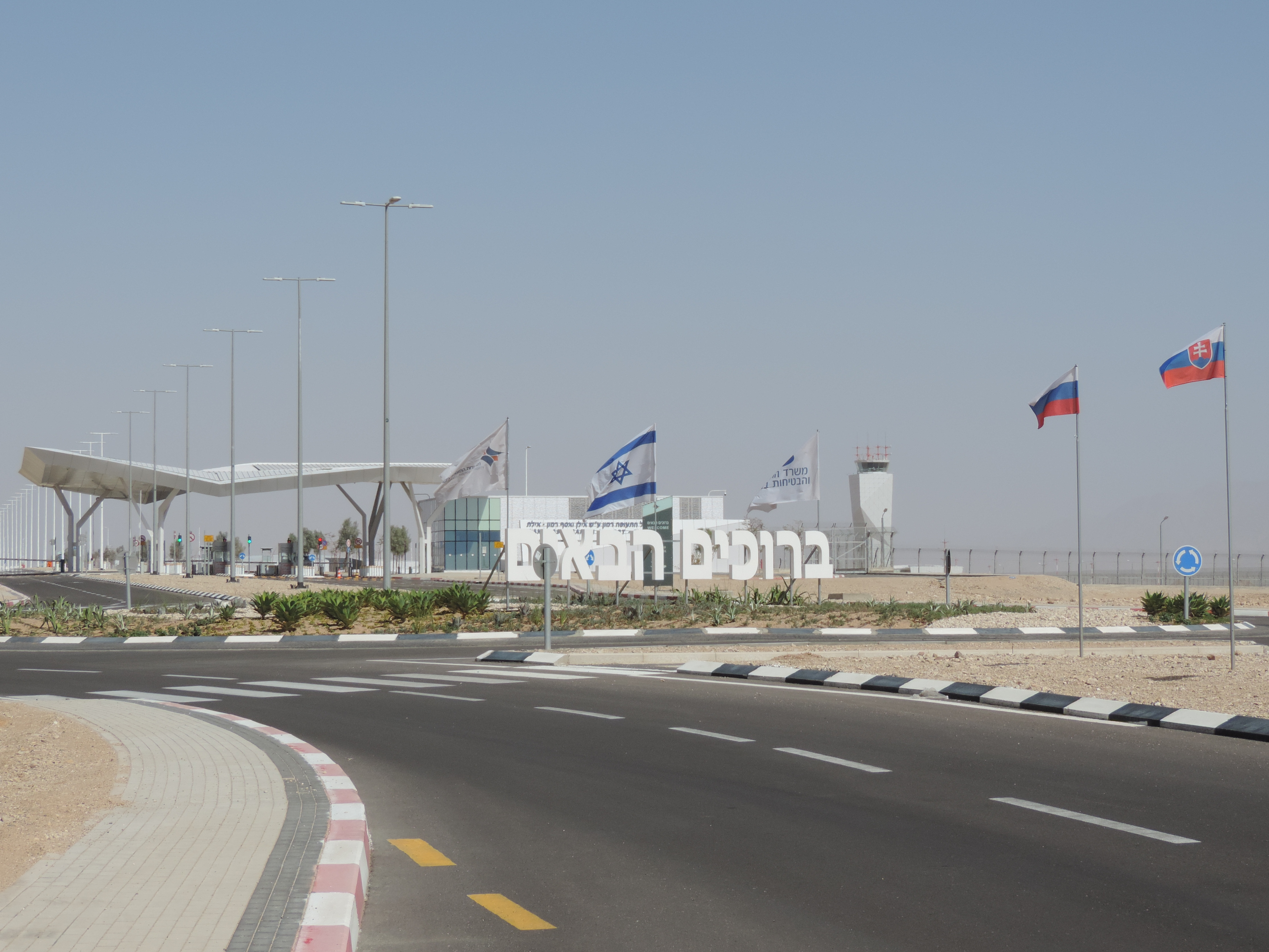
Ramon Airport

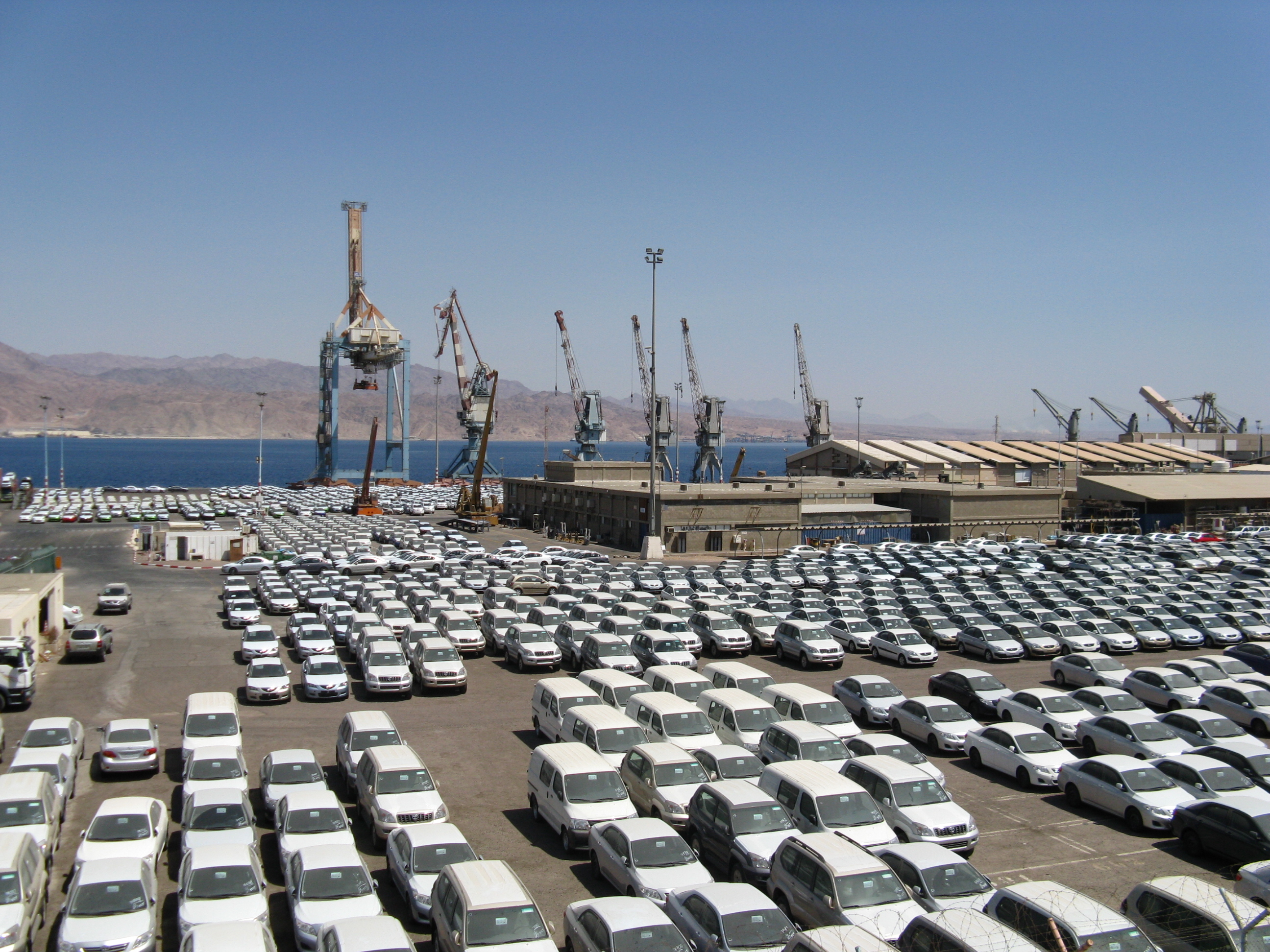
Port of Eilat

=== Air ===
Since 2019, Ramon International Airport has handled commercial domestic and international flights to Eilat (IATA: ETM, ICAO: LLER).

==== Former airports ====
- Eilat Airport is located in the city centre and was used largely for domestic flights (IATA: ETH, ICAO: LLET). The former site is to be redeveloped.
- International flights often used Ovda International Airport some 50 kilometres (31 mi) northwest of the city (IATA: VDA, ICAO: LLOV). While no civilian flights use the airport any longer, it remains in use as a military airbase and for aircraft storage.

=== Road ===
Eilat has two main roads connecting it with the center of Israel – Route 12, which leads North West, and Route 90 which leads North East, and South West to the border crossing with Egypt.

==== Bus ====
Egged, the national bus company, provides regular service to points north on an almost hourly basis as well as in-city on a half-hourly basis during daylight hours. In part due to the comparatively long travel times, there are different booking procedures for buses to Eilat, including the option of advance reservations.

=== Border crossings with Egypt and Jordan ===
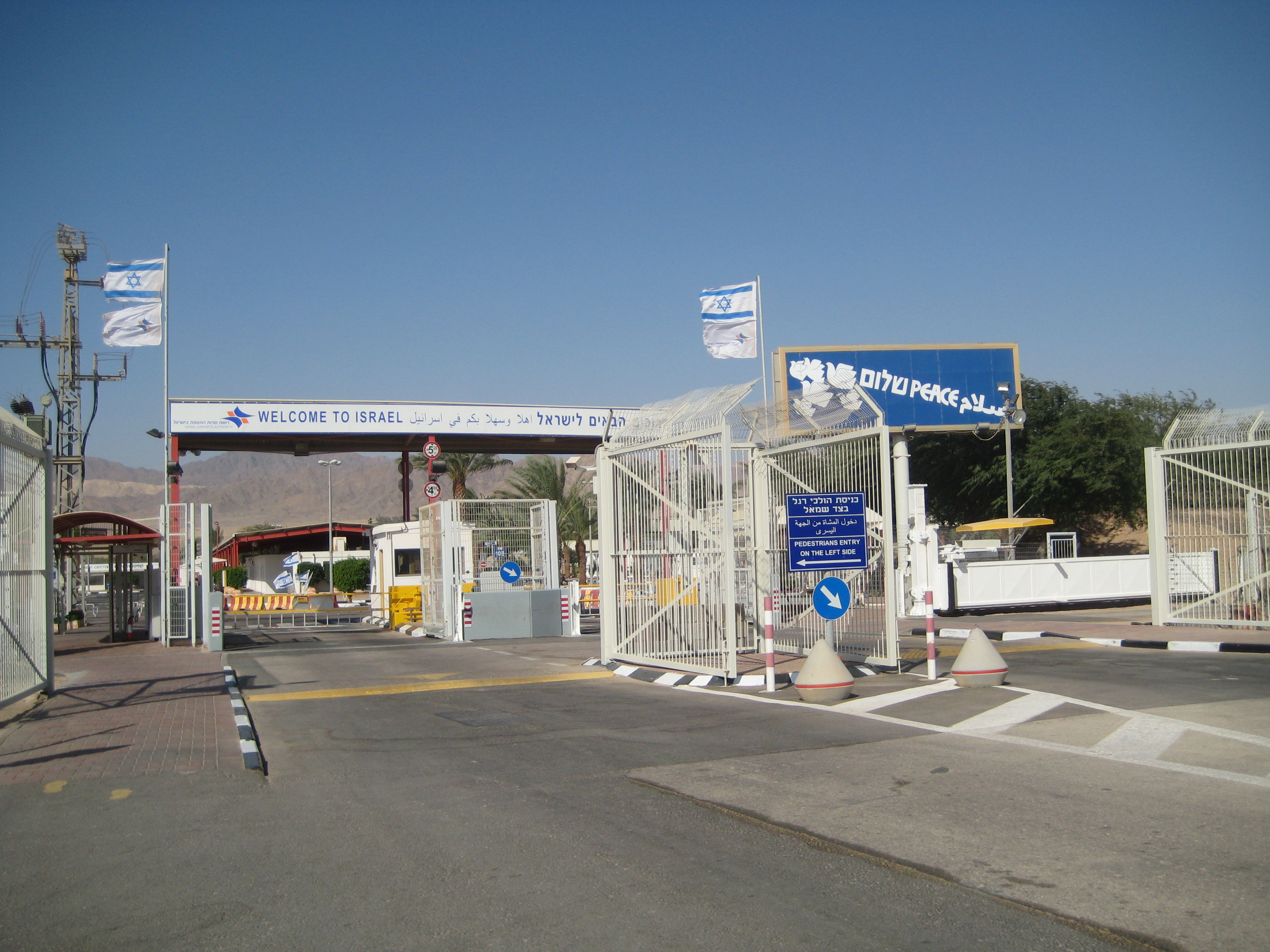
Yitzhak Rabin Crossing

- The Taba Border Crossing allows crossing to and from Taba, Egypt.
- The Wadi Araba Crossing, renamed the Yitzhak Rabin Border Crossing on the Israeli side, allows crossing to and from Aqaba, Jordan.

=== Maritime ===
The Port of Eilat and Eilat Marina allow travel by sea.

=== Rail ===
Future plans also call for a rail link, sometimes referred to as the Med-Red to decrease travel times substantially from Eilat to Tel Aviv and Jerusalem, via the existing line at Beer Sheba; planning is underway. As of 2021 Dimona railway station is the southernmost passenger train station in Israel.

== Economy ==
In the 1970s tourism became increasingly important to the city's economy as other industries shut down or were drastically reduced. Today tourism is the city's major source of income, although Eilat became a free trade zone in 1985.

=== Tourism ===
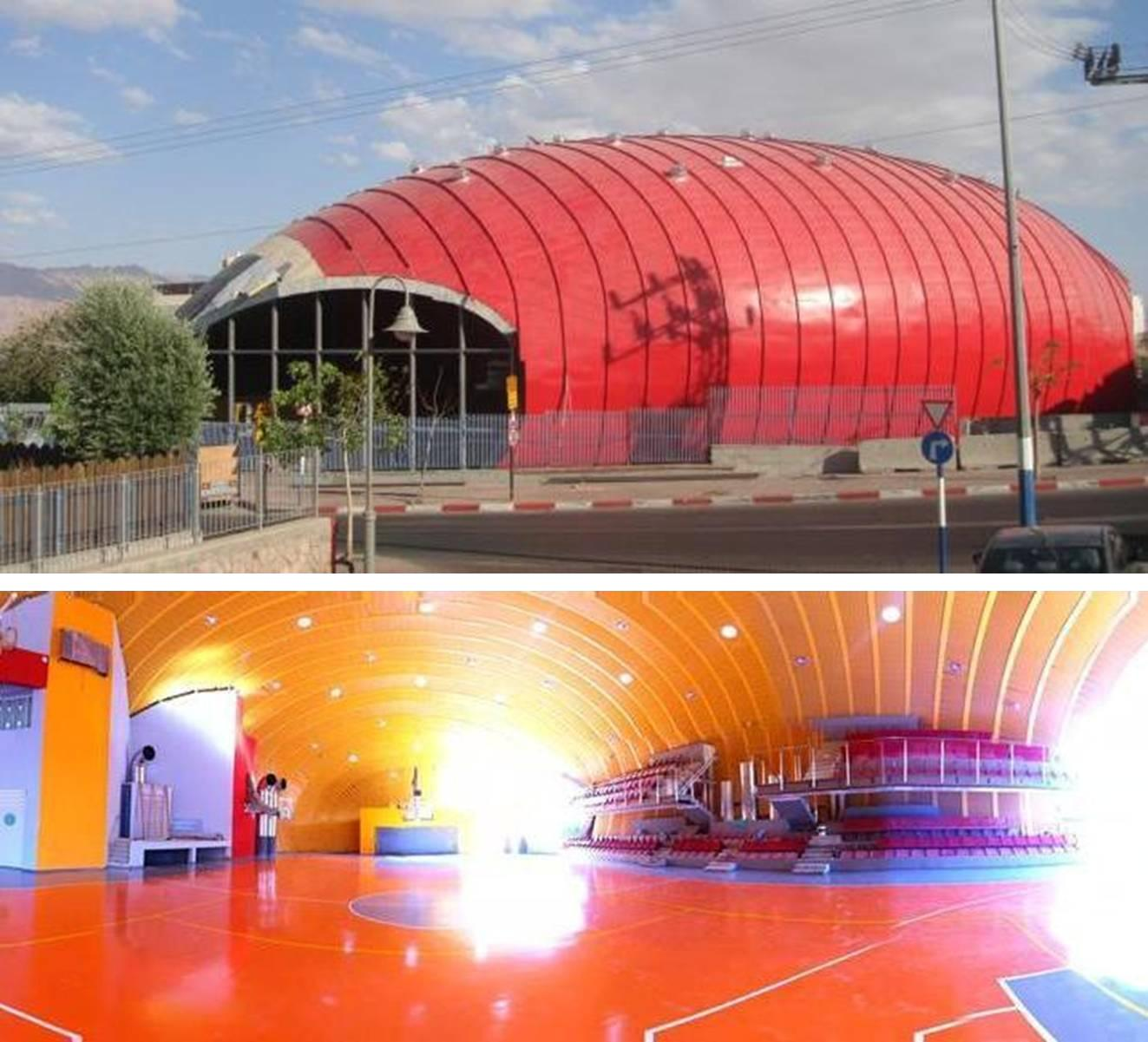
Eilat Sports Center, a $3 million project, was completed in 2013.

Eilat offers a wide range of accommodations, from hostels and luxury hotels to Bedouin hospitality. In recent years Eilat has been the target of militants from Egypt and Gaza causing a reduced tourist inflow to the region. Attractions include:

- Birdwatching and ringing station: Eilat is located on the main migration route between Africa and Europe. International Birding & Research Center in Eilat.
- Camel tours
- Coral Beach Nature Reserve, an underwater marine reserve of tropical marine flora and fauna
- Coral World Underwater Observatory, located at the southern tip of Coral Beach, it has aquaria, a museum, simulation rides, and shark, turtle, and stingray tanks. The observatory is the biggest public aquarium in the Middle East.
- Dolphin Reef, a marine biology and research station where visitors can swim and interact with dolphins
- Freefall parachuting.
- Yotvata Hai-Bar Nature Reserve, established in the 1960s to conserve endangered species, including Biblical animals, from this and similar regions. The reserve has a visitors' center, care and treatment enclosures, and a large open area where desert animals are acclimated before re-introduction into the wild. Hai-Bar efforts have successfully re-introduced the Asian wild ass, or onager, into the Negev. The Hai-Bar Nature Reserve and animal re-introduction program were described in Bill Clark's book "High Hills and Wild Goats: Life Among the Animals of the Hai-Bar Wildlife Refuge". The book also describes life in Eilat and the surrounding area.
- Marina, with some 250 yacht berths
- Timna Valley Park, the oldest copper mines in the world; Egyptian temple of Hathor, King Solomon's Pillars sandstone formation, ancient pit mines and rock art
- "What's Up", a portable astronomical observatory with programs in the desert and on the promenade
- Ice Mall, ice skating rink and shopping mall

=== Dive tourism ===
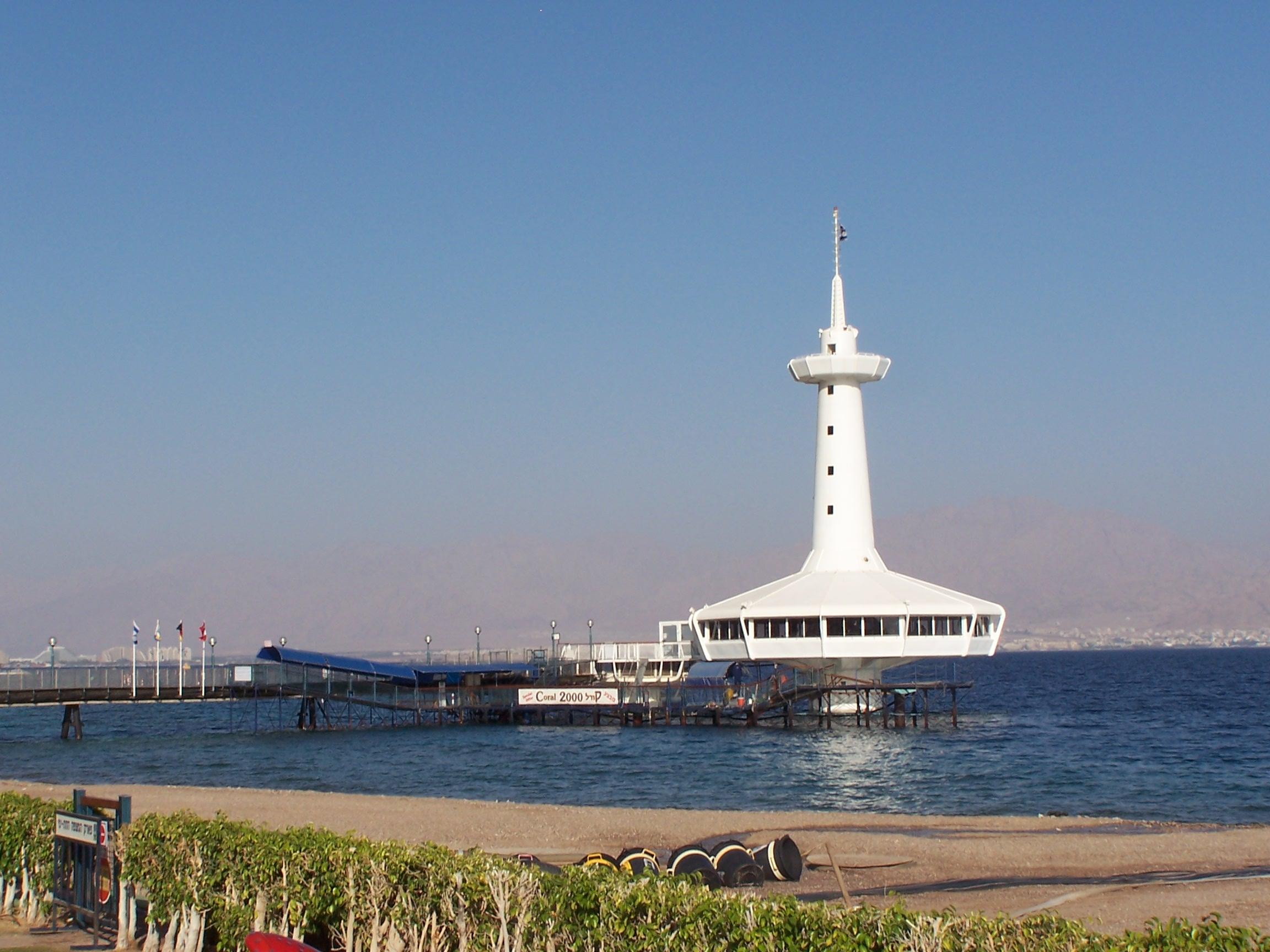
Coral World Underwater Observatory

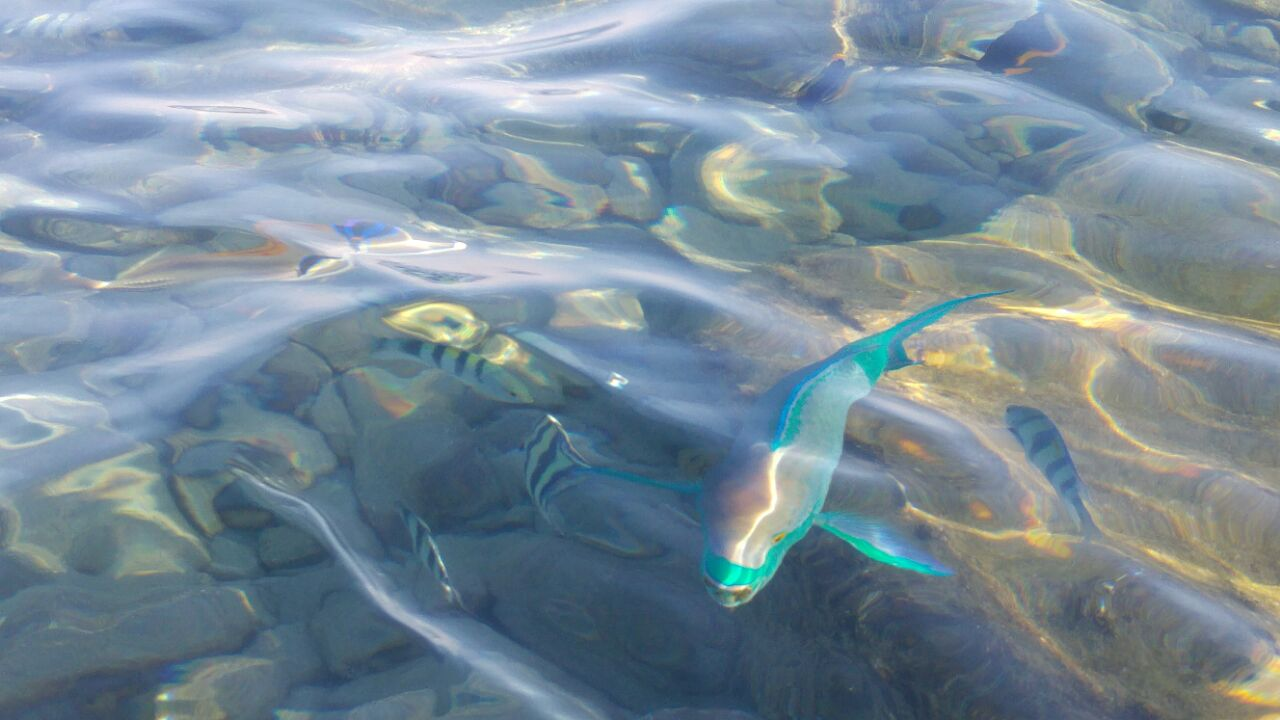
Eilat sea

Skin and scuba diving equipment is for hire on or near all major beaches. Scuba diving equipment rental and compressed air are available from diving clubs and schools all year round. Eilat is located in the Gulf of Aqaba, one of the most popular diving destinations in the world. The coral reefs along Eilat's coast remain relatively pristine and the area is recognized as one of the prime diving locations in the world. About 250,000 dives are performed annually in Eilat's 11 km (6.8 mi) coastline, and diving represents 10% of the tourism income of this area. In addition, given the proximity of many of these reefs to the shore, non-divers can encounter the Red Sea's reefs with relative ease. Water conditions for SCUBA divers are good all year round, with water temperatures around 21–25 °C (70–77 °F), with little or no currents and clear waters with an average of 20–30 metres (66–98 feet) visibility.

=== Museums ===
- Eilat City Museum
- Eilat Art Gallery

=== Film ===
Eilat has been utilized by film and television productions – domestic and foreign – for location shooting since the 1960s, most notably in the early 90s as a tropical locale for season 2 of the Canadian production Tropical Heat.

It was also used in the films She, Madron, Ashanti and Rambo III.

== Archaeology ==
Despite harsh conditions, the region has supported large populations as far back as 8,000 BCE. Several Neolithic sites have been discovered in Eilat in its vicinity. One of them is a late Neolithic burial site with fan scrapers, dated by archaeologists to 5410–4250 BCE.

Exploration of ancient sites began in 1861, but only 7% of the area has undergone serious archaeological excavation. Some 1,500 ancient sites are located in a 1,200-square-kilometer (460 sq mi) area. In contrast to the gaps found in settlement periods in the neighbouring Negev Highlands and Sinai, these sites show continuous settlement for the past 10,000 years.

== Voting patterns ==
In the 2022 election, 62 percent of voters in Eilat voted for the parties of the right-wing coalition led by Benjamin Netanyahu, while 35 percent voted for the parties of the center-left coalition led by Yair Lapid and 1 percent voted for the Arab parties.

In the 2026 election, 57 percent of voters in Eilat voted for the parties of the right-wing coalition led by Benjamin Netanyahu, while 36 percent voted for the parties of the center-left coalition led by Gadi Eisenkot and 1.7 percent voted for the Arab parties. An additional 3.2 percent voted for the Reservists, and 1.6 percent voted for Amcha Yisrael. Voter turnout increased 24 percent from the 2022 election.

== Notable people ==
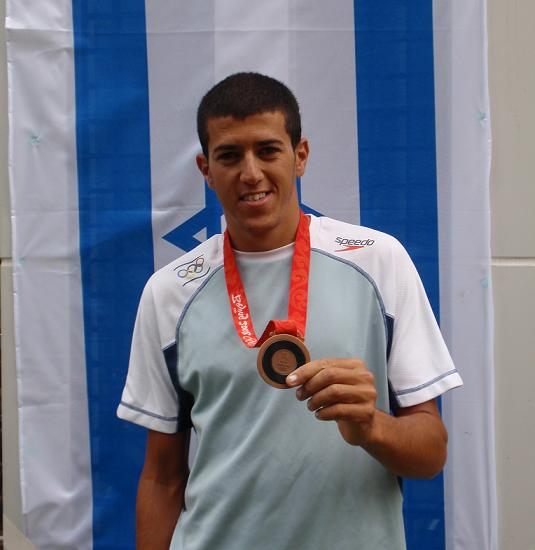
Shahar Tzuberi

- Shawn Dawson (born 1993), basketball player
- Gadi Eizenkot (born 1960), Chief of General Staff of the Israel Defense Forces
- Eden Harel (born 1976), actress
- Amit Ivry (born 1989), Olympic swimmer and national record holder
- Keren Karolina Avratz (born 1971), singer, songwriter
- Shaul Mofaz (born 1948), former Minister of Defense, former Chief of General Staff of the Israel Defense Forces
- Ziki Shaked (born 1955), first Israeli ship's captain to go around the world under the Israeli flag, from Eilat to Eilat
- Eyal Zamir (born 1966), Chief of General Staff of the Israel Defense Forces
- Shahar Tzuberi (born 1986), Israeli Olympic bronze-medal-winning windsurfer, 2008 Olympic Games in Beijing
- Raviv Ullman (born 1986), Israeli-American actor, musician
- Ghil'ad Zuckermann (born 1971), linguist, with a focus on language revitalization

== Twin towns – sister cities ==
Eilat is twinned with:

- Acapulco, Mexico
- Antibes, France
- Arica, Chile
- Durban, South Africa
- Kamen, Germany
- Kampen, Netherlands
- Karlovy Vary, Czech Republic
- Los Angeles, United States
- Palanga, Lithuania
- Piešťany, Slovakia
- Sopron, Hungary
- Sorrento, Italy
- Yalta, Ukraine
- Yinchuan, China
- Ushuaia, Argentina

Eilat has streets named after Antibes, Durban, Kamen, Kampen and Los Angeles as well as a Canada Park.

== Panoramic views ==
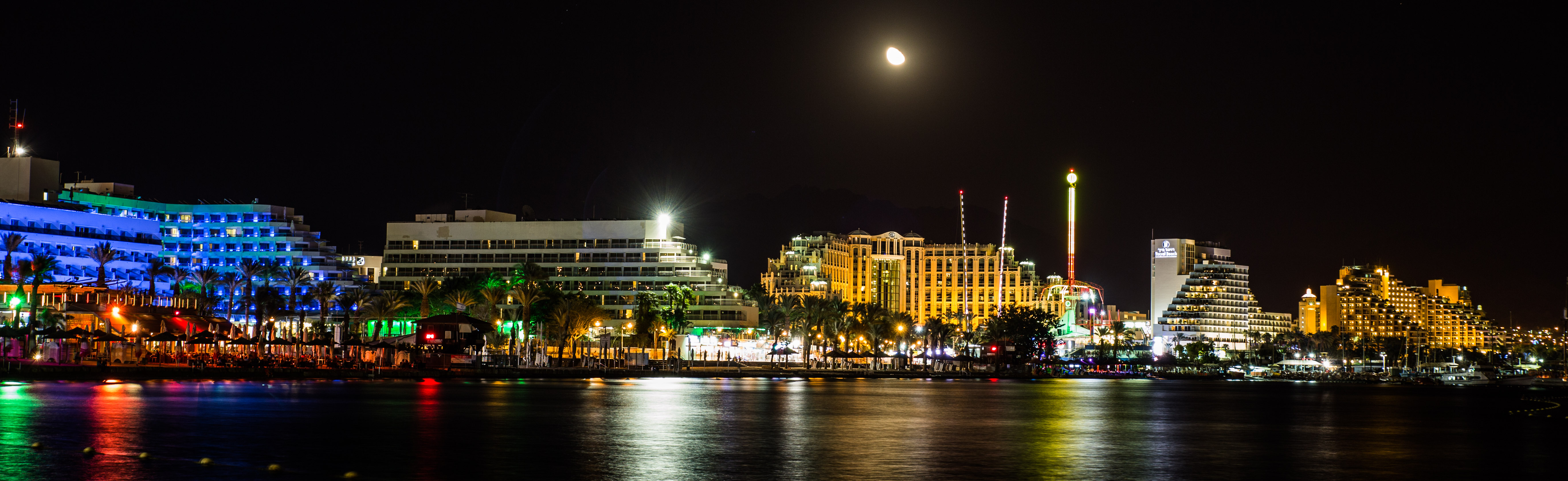
Eilat coastline at night
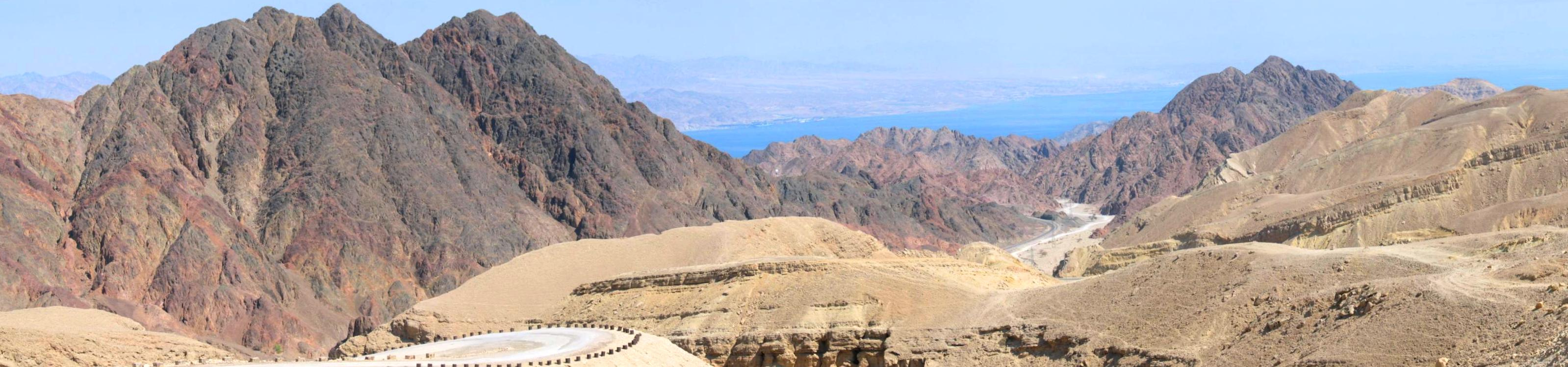
Panorama of the Eilat Mountains

== See also ==
- Bnei Eilat F.C.
- Eilat Pride
- Eilat Sports Center
- Eilat stone
- Hapoel Eilat B.C.
- Operation Ovda
- Red Sea Jazz Festival
- Yotvata Airfield
