= Ziki Shaked =

Israeli captain & sailing instructor

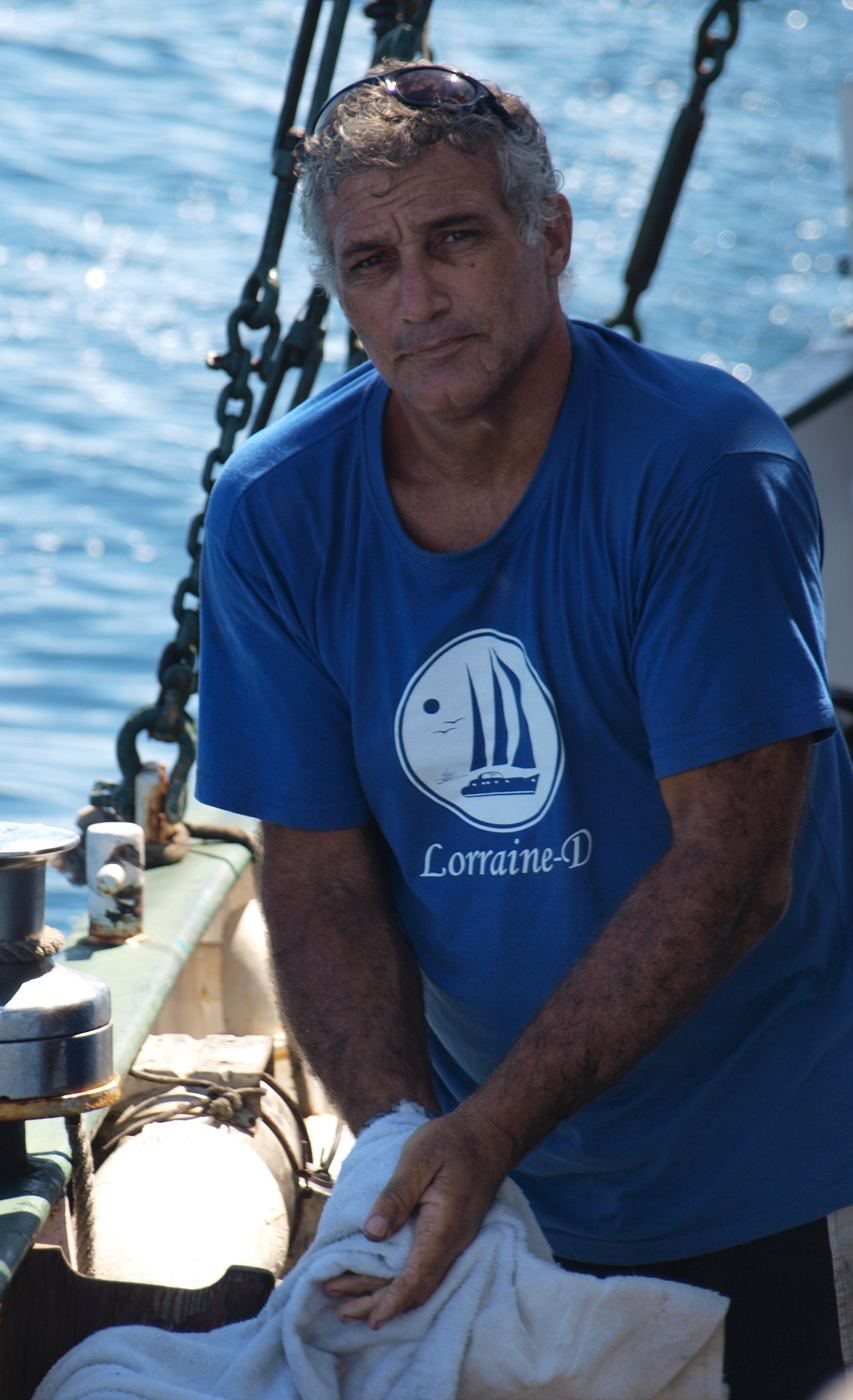
Ziki Shaked, an Israeli captain, who went around the world under the Israeli flag.

Ziki Shaked (Hebrew: ציקי שקד; born 1955) is an Israeli captain, sailing instructor, and founder of the school of sailing in Eilat.

In 2010–2012, he traveled around the world on his yacht, "Lorraine-D", and joined a small group of Israeli captains who traveled around the world under the Israeli flag.

The yacht "Lorraine-D" started from Eilat and two years later came back to Eilat. The route passed through the Suez Canal into the Mediterranean Sea, the Atlantic Ocean, through the Panama Canal to the Pacific Ocean, the Indian Ocean, the Gulf of Aden, and the Red Sea.

The boat travelled to unique places, such as the Galápagos Islands, Easter Island, the Pitcairn Islands, and Vanuatu. At various times, people from different countries of the world, including Israel, Russia, Finland, and France, joined this journey.
