= Dolphin Reef =

Coordinates: 29°30′55″N 34°55′34″E

The Dolphin Reef is a tourist attraction in Eilat, Israel. It advertises the following activities that they claim focus mainly on dolphins and conserving them: swimming with dolphins, diving lessons, guided tours, lectures and workshops and an information centre.

== History ==
The Dolphin Reef opened in 1990. The site is home to Black Sea bottlenose dolphins that are not trained to perform and there are no dolphin shows, but they are able to interact freely with human visitors. The dolphins, known for their curiosity and friendliness, approach the observation posts and floating piers, and swim alongside the people who snorkel and dive there.

The sea-pen covers an area of 10,000 square metres (110,000 sq ft), and is enclosed with buoyed nets. It is an average of 12 metres (39 ft) deep. The eastern side has a steeply sloping wall profile, giving way to a sandy slope. Many species of fish can be found in the area. Angelfish, butterflyfish, cuttlefish, bluespotted and blackspotted stingrays are common.

The Dolphin Reef Dive Center offers individual and group diving tours, as well as special therapy sessions for the disabled and seminars on animal and dolphin behavior.

== See also ==
- Tourism in Israel
- Wildlife of Israel
