= Eilat Mountains =

Mountain range in southern Israel

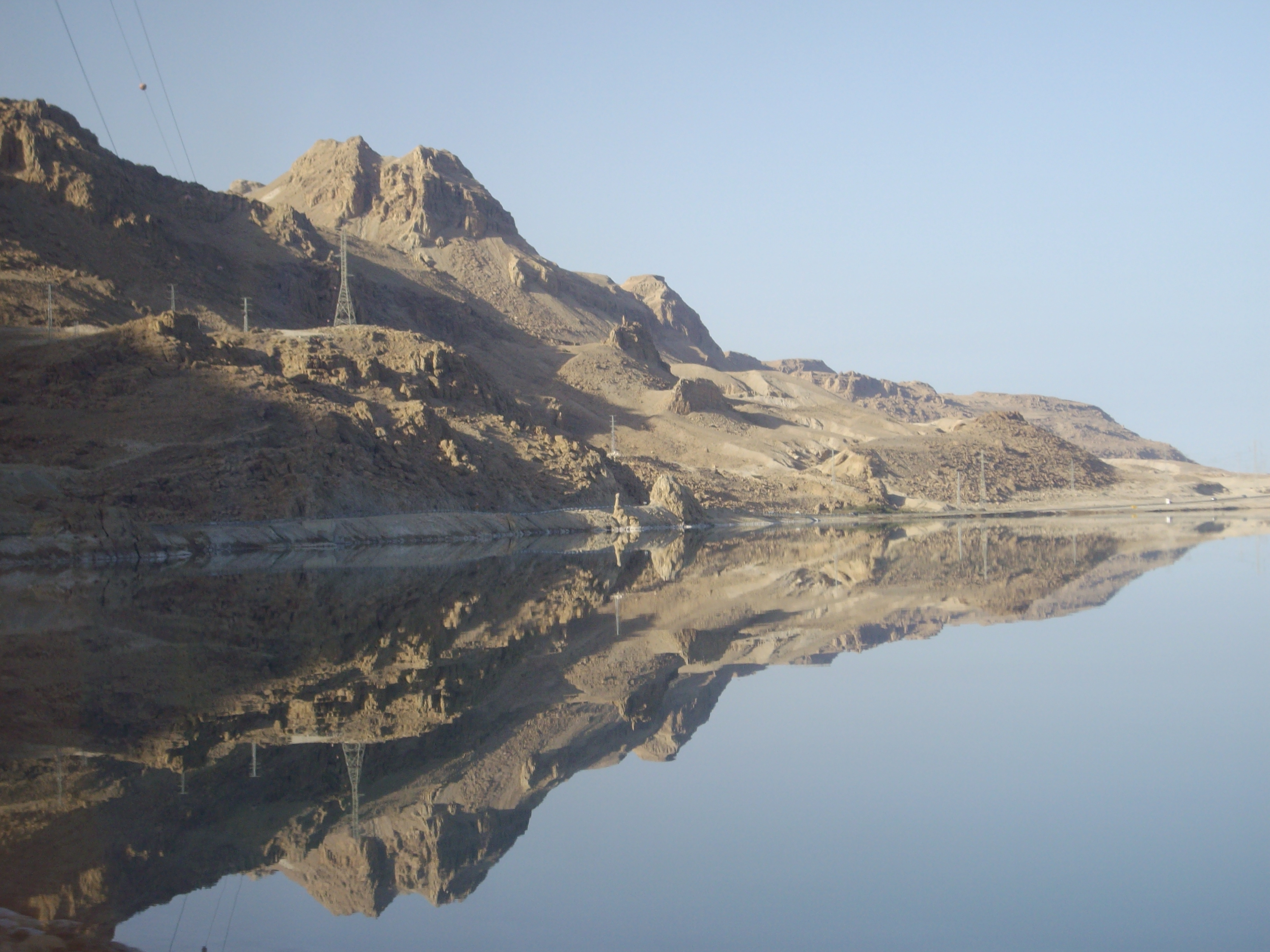
- Eilat Mountains reflection in the Gulf of Aqaba, 2007

Highest point
- Elevation: 900 m (3,000 ft)
- Coordinates: 29°40′02″N 34°54′51″E

Geography
- Location within Israel
- Location: Southern Negev, Israel

Geology
- Mountain type: Igneous rock

The Eilat Mountains (Hebrew: הרי אילת Harei Eilat) are a mountain range within the southern Negev in southern Israel. The ranges of the Timna Valley belong to the Eilat Mountains. Among the central block of mountains, Mount Hezekiah is the highest, followed by Mount Solomon. The mountains overlook the Gulf of Aqaba, which is part of the Red Sea.

The rock formations in the Eilat mountains are a mix of granite, limestone, and sandstone, that can be described as "extremely colorful".

== Etymology ==
The mountain range is named after the nearby city of Eilat and the biblical name of the city Eilot (Eiloth), situated where today the city of Aqaba (Jordan) is located.

== Neighboring countries ==
From the top of Mt. Tzfachot, in the southern tip of the mountain range, visitors may see Egyptian land (via the Sinai Peninsula) when looking southwestward. Visitors looking eastward, across the Gulf of Aqaba, may also see Jordanian land. On clear days, as well, Saudi Arabia can be seen, looking southeastward (also across the Gulf of Aqaba).

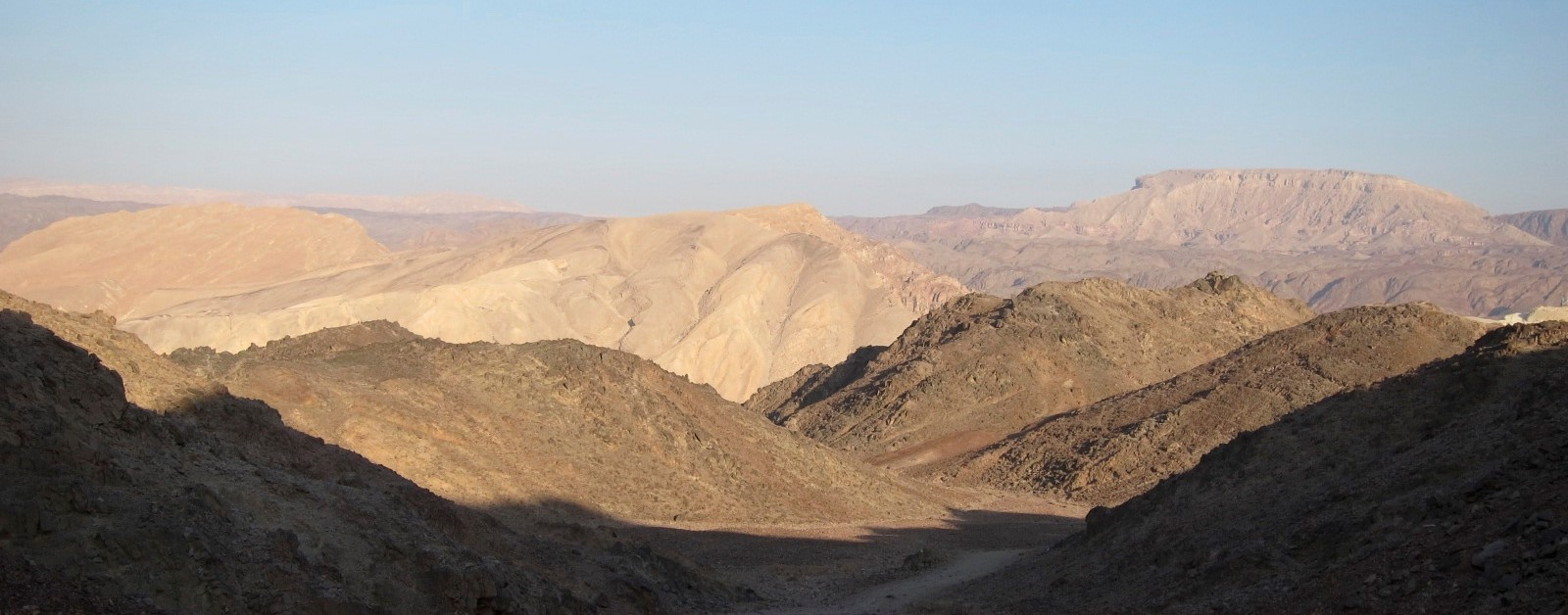
In the background, Egypt can be seen from Mt. Tzfachot, July 2013

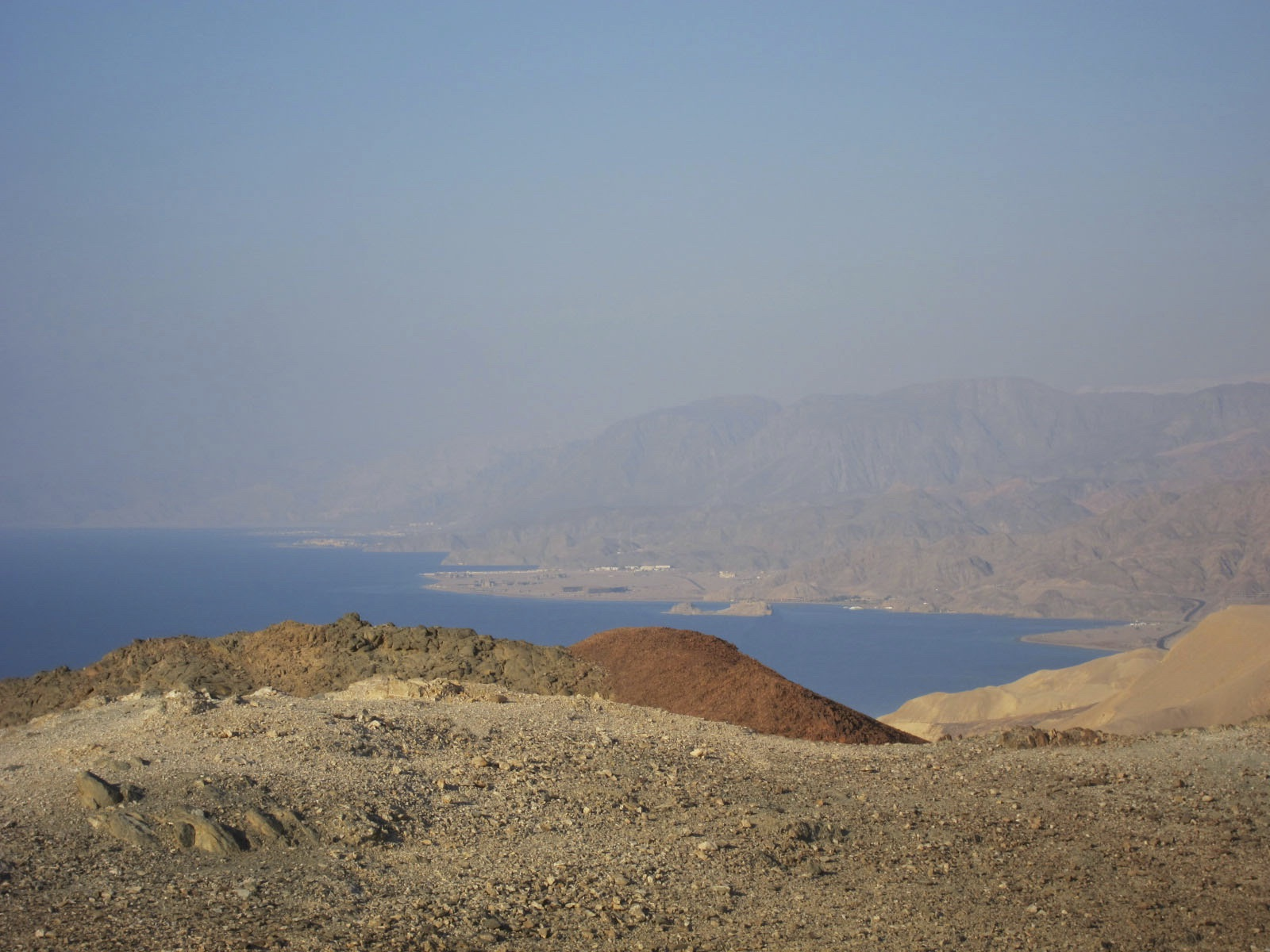
From atop Mount Tzfachot looking south. Israel in the foreground and in the background - the Egyptian western coast of the gulf: the city of Taba and Pharaoh's Island.

== Fauna ==
The ridge of the Eilat Mountains along the western side of the southern Arava Valley forms part of a 60,000 ha Important Bird Area (IBA), as designated by BirdLife International, because it supports populations of various bird species, especially waterbirds and raptors on seasonal migration.
