= Eilat stone =

Type of gemstone

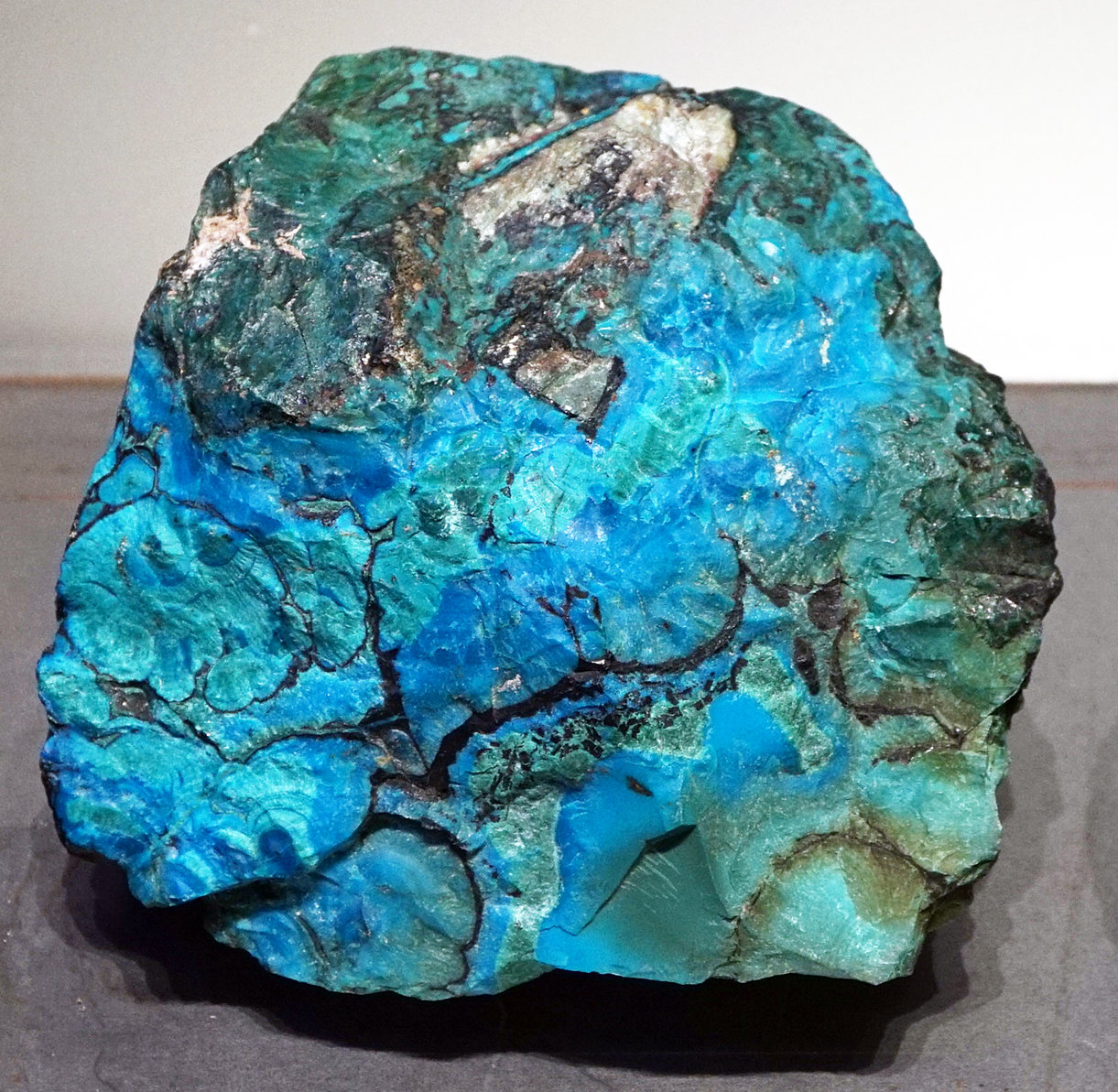
Eilat stone, mineral

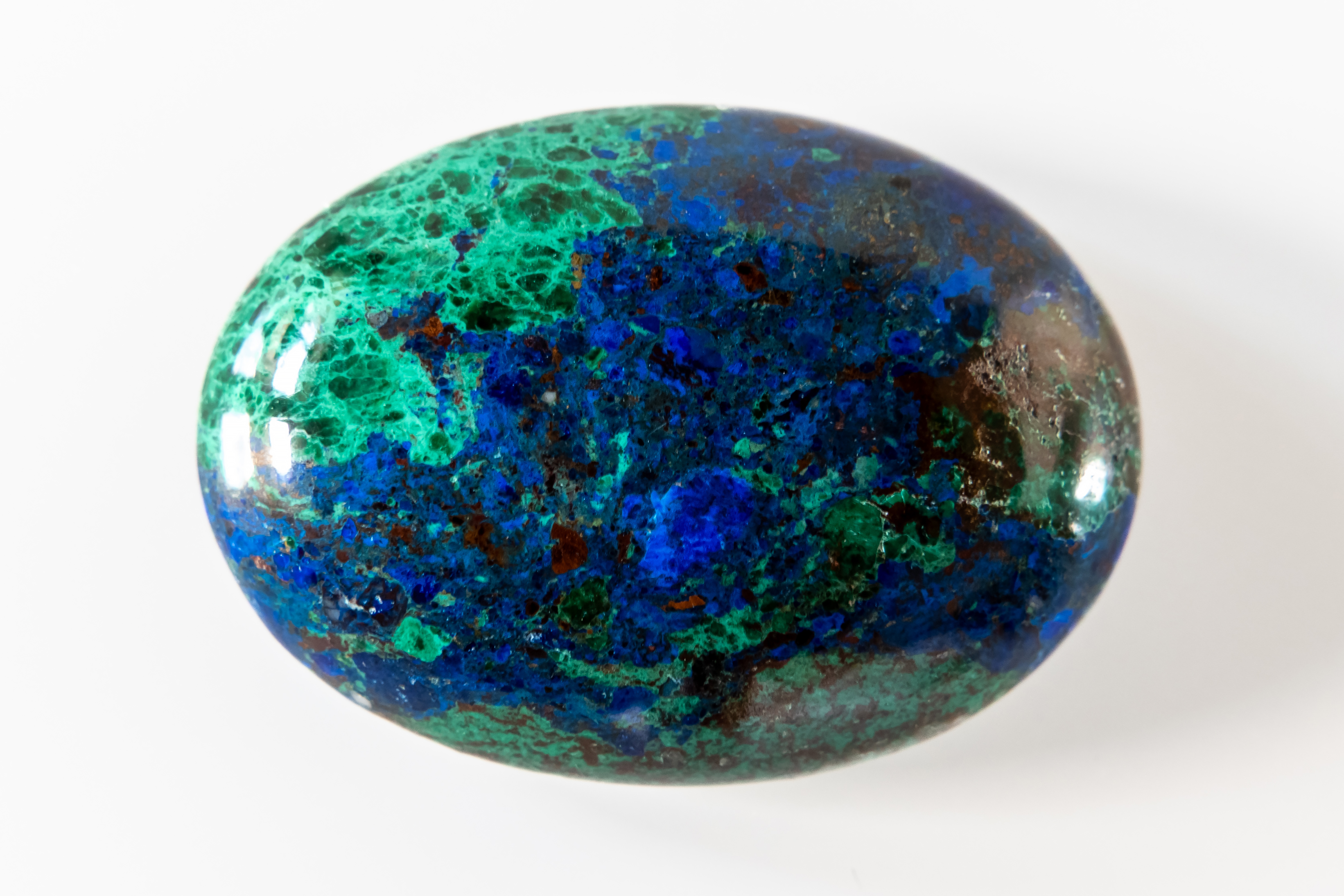
Eilat stone, oval cabochon

Eilat Stone (Hebrew: אבן אילת) or eilatstone is a gemstone that derives its name from the city of Eilat in Israel, located near where it was once mined. It is characterized by a green-blue heterogeneous mixture of several secondary copper minerals, including malachite, azurite, turquoise, pseudomalachite, and chrysocolla. Eilatstone is the national stone of Israel, and is also known as the King Solomon stone.
