= Eilat City Museum =

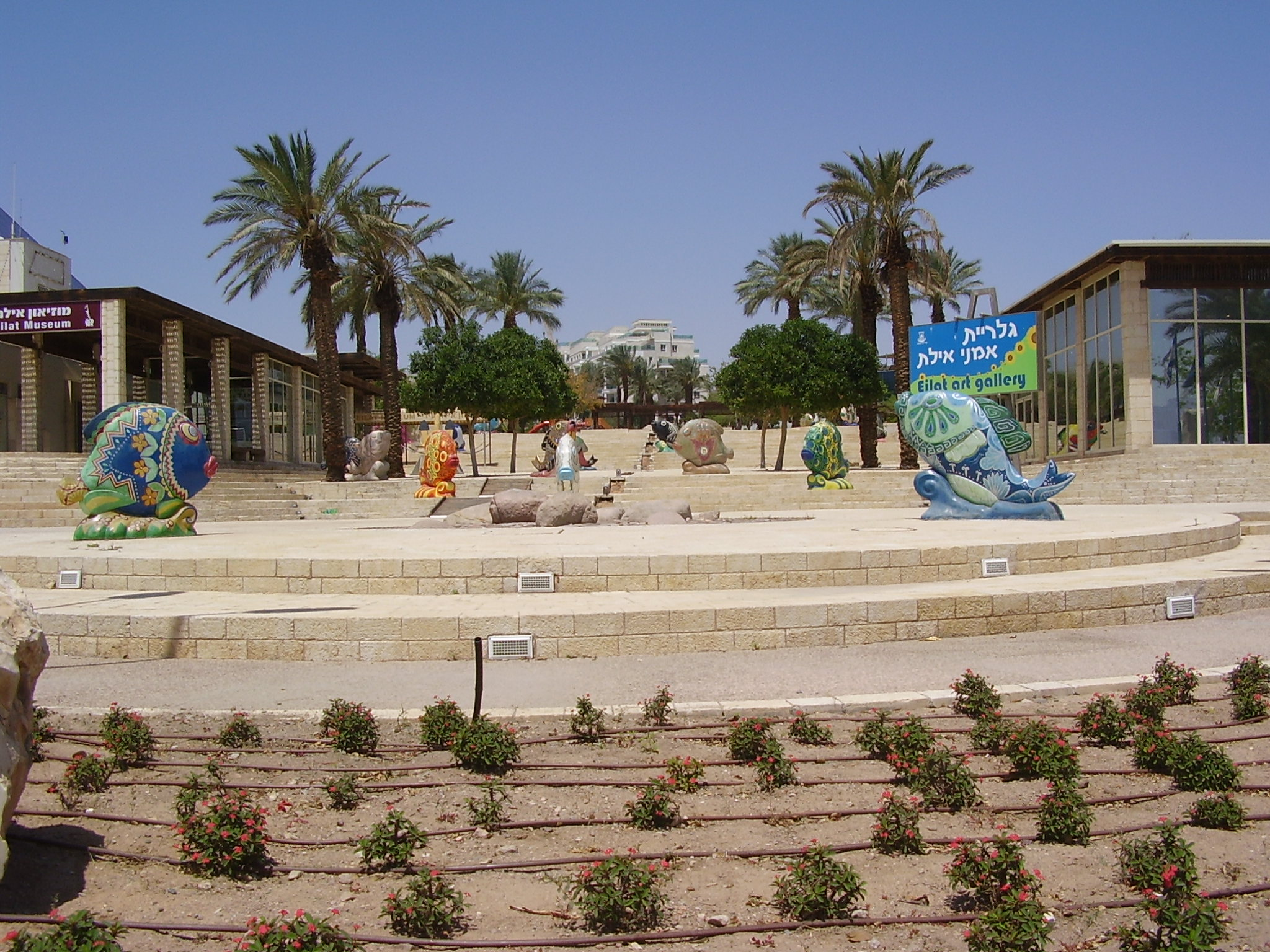
- Location: Eilat, Israel
- Coordinates: 29.551692°N 34.952926°E
- Type: History Museum

The Eilat City Museum (Hebrew: מוזיאון היסטורי "אילת עירי") is a history museum in Eilat, Israel. The museum is dedicated to the history of the development of the city of Eilat.

== History ==
The museum was established by a group of veteran volunteers from the city of Eilat.

== Collections ==
The museum has exhibits about the capture of the city of Eilat in 1949, the history of the Israel Red Sea Outpost. The museum has a collection of photos about the development of the city of Eilat dating from the 1940s to the 1960s. The museum contains information and multimedia about the companies that settled in this part of Israel such as the Salt Company, Mekorot Underwater Observatory Company and the Eilat Electric Company. The museum contains exhibits about the establishment of the city of Eilat as well as information about Israel's southern border, and there are also exhibits in the museum about the Eilat pipeline. The museum also contains information about Timna Copper Mines and the port of Eilat, as well as exhibits about the city's environment. The museum contains exhibits about Operation Uvda. The museum also has a missile storage container obtained from the Karina-A boat. The museum has exhibits about the fauna of Israel's Red Sea coastal territories. The museum has a reconstructed model of a bus from the Ma'ale Akrabim massacre.

== Gallery ==
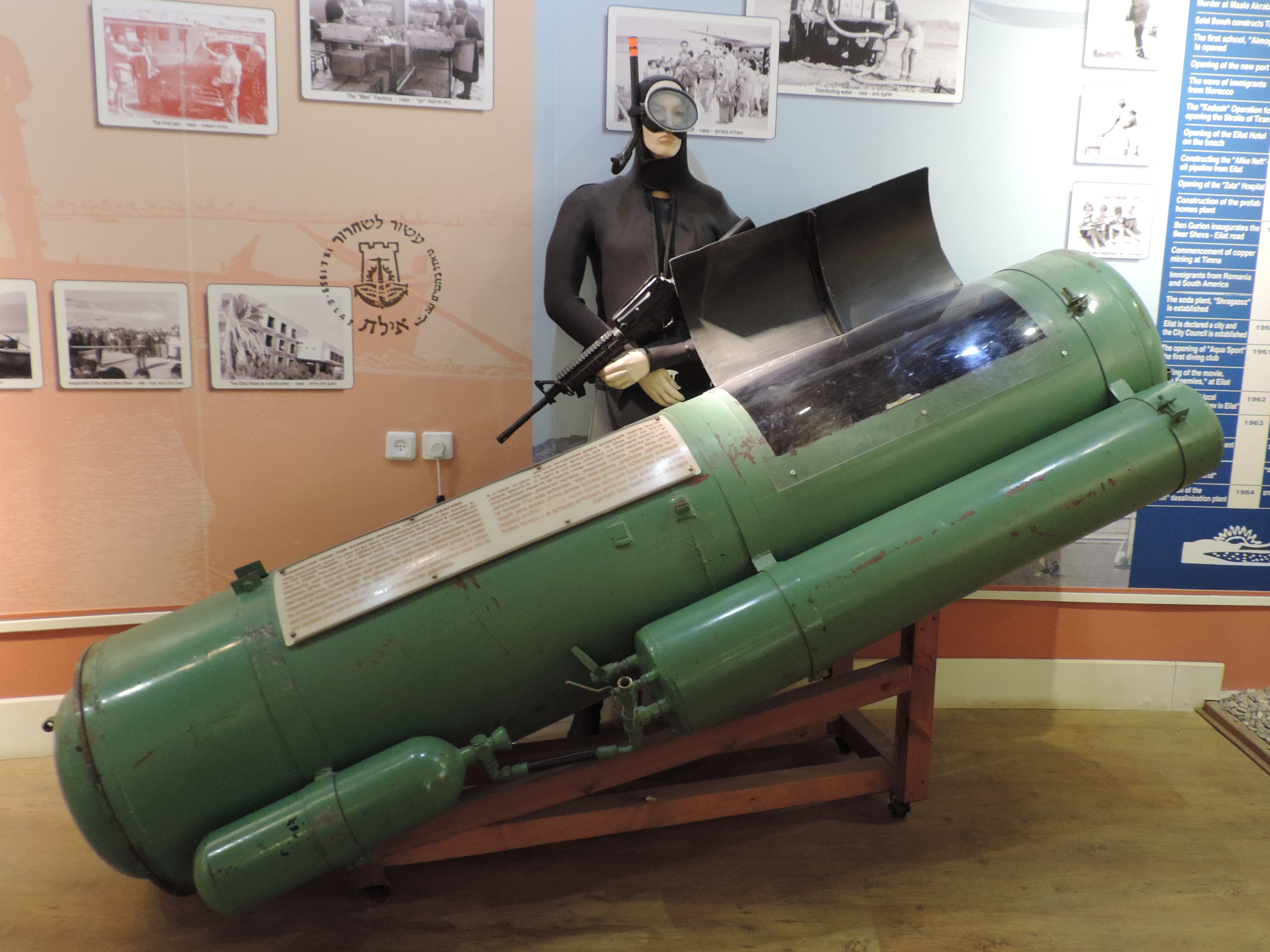

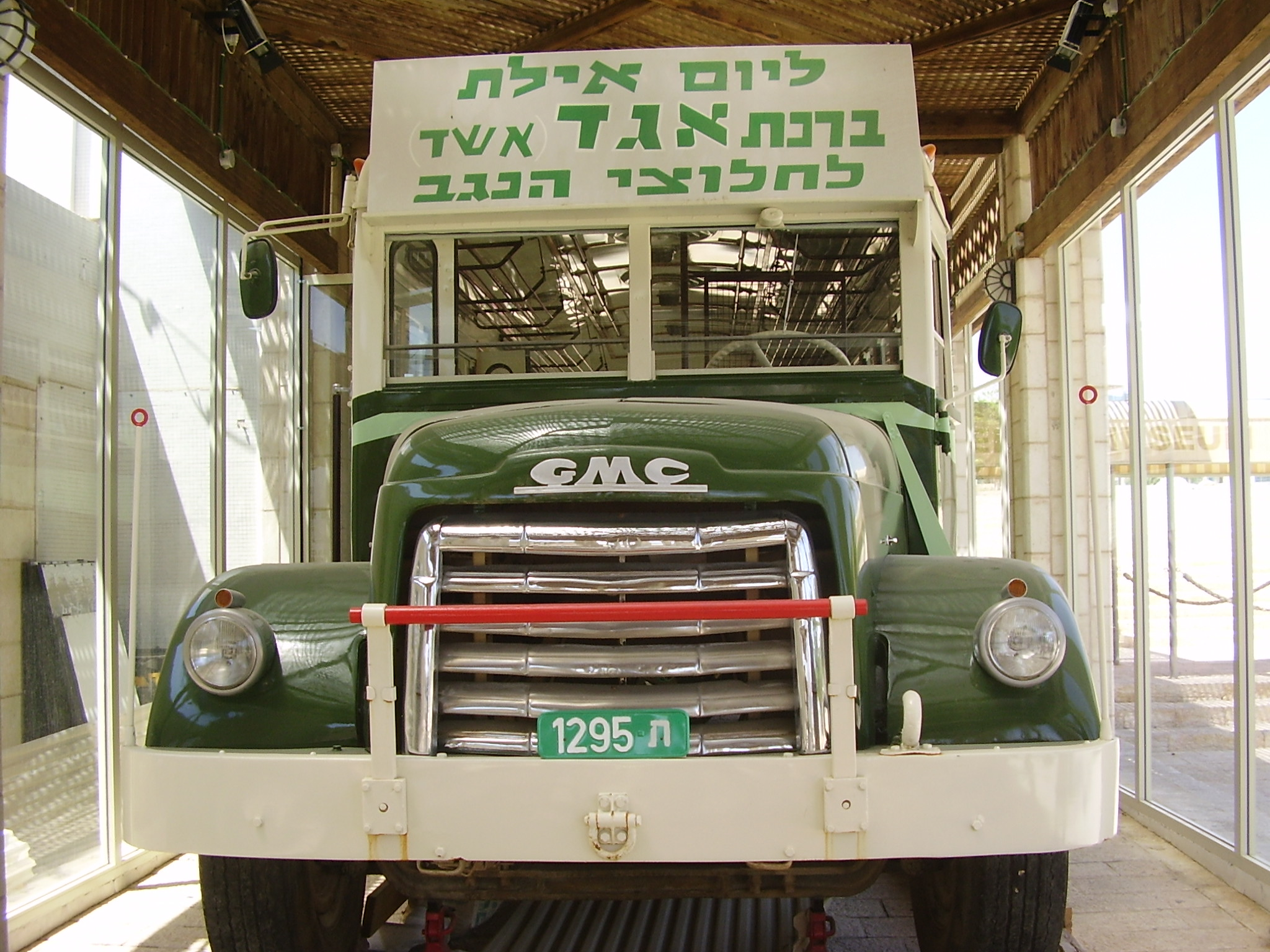

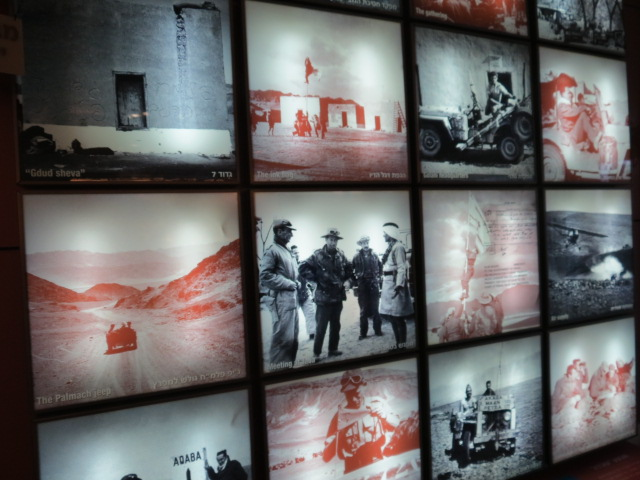

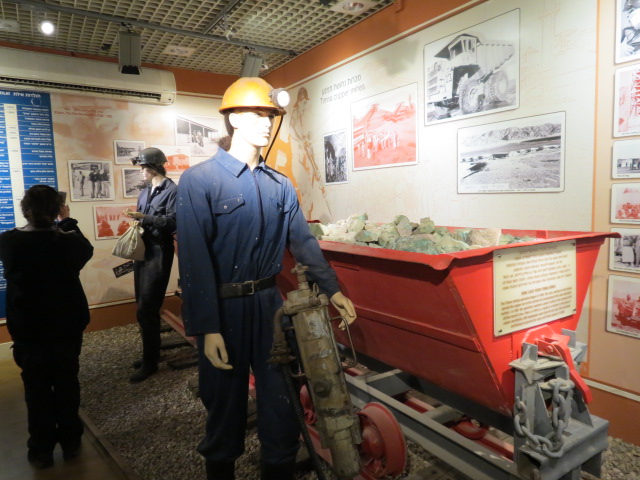

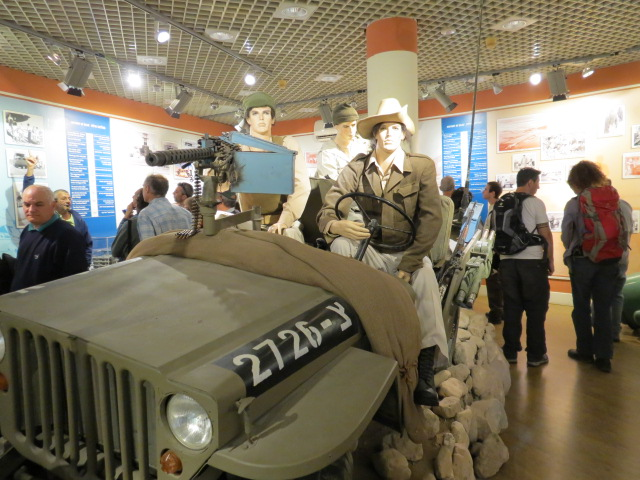
