= List of airports in Israel =

Map of Israeli airports

This is a list of airports in Israel.

== Airports ==
=== International airports ===
Currently there are three international airports operational in Israel, managed by the Israel Airports Authority. Ben Gurion Airport serves as the main entrance and exit airport in and out of Israel. Ramon Airport being the second largest airport serves as the primary diversion airport for Ben Gurion Airport. Another, smaller, international airport is Haifa Airport, which also has a military base alongside its civilian terminal.

Airport name	ICAO	IATA	City served	Location	Founded
Ben Gurion Airport	LLBG	TLV	Tel Aviv and Jerusalem	Lod, Central District	1937
Ramon Airport	LLER	ETM	Eilat	Be'er Ora, Southern District	2019
Haifa Airport	LLHA	HFA	Haifa	Haifa, Haifa District	1934

=== Unscheduled domestic airports ===
Two other airports are managed by the Israel Airports Authority, and have no scheduled flights.

Airport name	ICAO	IATA	City served	Location	Founded
Herzliya Airport	LLHZ		Herzliya	Herzliya, Tel Aviv District	1948
Rosh Pina Airport	LLIB	RPN	Rosh Pinna	Mahanayim, Northern District	1943

=== Private airstrips ===
There are about 14 other airstrips across Israel and the Golan Heights, which are mostly used privately or for flight trainings.

Airstrip name	ICAO	IATA	Location	Founded
Arad Airfield	LLAR		Arad, Southern District	N/A
Bar Yehuda Airfield	LLMZ	MTZ	Masada, Southern District	1963
Be'er Sheva Teyman Airfield	LLBS	BEV	Be'er Sheva, Southern District	1950s
Ein Vered Airfield	LLEV		Ein Vered, Central District	N/A
Ein Yahav-Sapir Airfield	LLEY	EIY	Sapir, Southern District	1970
Fik Airfield	LLFK		Afik, Northern District	1981
Habonim Airfield	LLBO		Habonim, Haifa District	N/A
Kiryat Shmona Airport	LLKS	KSW	Kiryat Shmona, Northern District	N/A
Megiddo Airfield	LLMG		Megiddo, Northern District	1942
Mitzpe Ramon Airfield	LLMR	MIP	Mitzpe Ramon, Southern District	N/A
Rishon LeZion Airfield	LLRS		Rishon LeZion, Central District	N/A
Tnuvot Airfield	LLTN		Tnuvot, Central District	N/A
Yotvata Airfield	LLYO	YOT	Yotvata, Southern District	N/A

=== Military airbases ===
All military airbases are owned by the Israeli Air Force.

Airbase name	ICAO	IATA	Location	Founded
Ein Shemer Airfield	LLES	HDA	Ein Shemer, Haifa District	1942
Hatzerim Airbase	LLHB		Be'er Sheva, Southern District	1966
Hatzor Airbase	LLHS		Hatzor Ashdod	1942
Nevatim Airbase	LLNV	VTM	Nevatim, Southern District	1983
Ovda Airbase	LLOV	VDA	Uvda region, Southern District	1981
Ramat David Airbase	LLRD		Ramat David, Northern District	1942
Ramon Airbase	LLRM		Mitzpe Ramon, Southern District	1982
Sdot Micha Airbase			Sdot Micha, Jerusalem District	1962
Tel Nof Airbase	LLEK		Rehovot, Central District	1939

=== Spaceport ===
Israel's only spaceport is part of a military airbase. Traffic is restricted by the Israeli Air Force. It is also managed partially by the Israel Space Agency.

Airbase/Spaceport name	ICAO	Location	Founded
Palmachim Airbase	LLPL	Palmachim, Central District	Second half of 1960s

=== Closed airports ===
Airport name	ICAO	IATA	City served	Location	Founded	Closed
Atarot Airport (Jerusalem-Atarot)	LLJR	JRS	Jerusalem	Jerusalem, Jerusalem District	1925	2001
Eilat Airport (Eilat-J. Hozman)	LLET	ETH	Eilat	Eilat, Southern District	1949	2019
Sde Dov Airport (Tel Aviv-Sde Dov)	LLSD	SDV	Tel Aviv	Tel Aviv, Tel Aviv District	1937	2019

== By passenger numbers ==
Rank	Airport	Passenger numbers	Ref
2025
1	Ben Gurion Airport	19,160,160	
2	Ramon Airport	743,429	
3	Haifa Airport	282,227	
2023
1	Ben Gurion Airport	21,088,237	
2	Ramon Airport	262,415	
2020
1	Ben Gurion Airport	4,808,980	
2	Ramon Airport	486,553	
2017
1	Ben Gurion Airport	20,781,211	

== Gallery ==
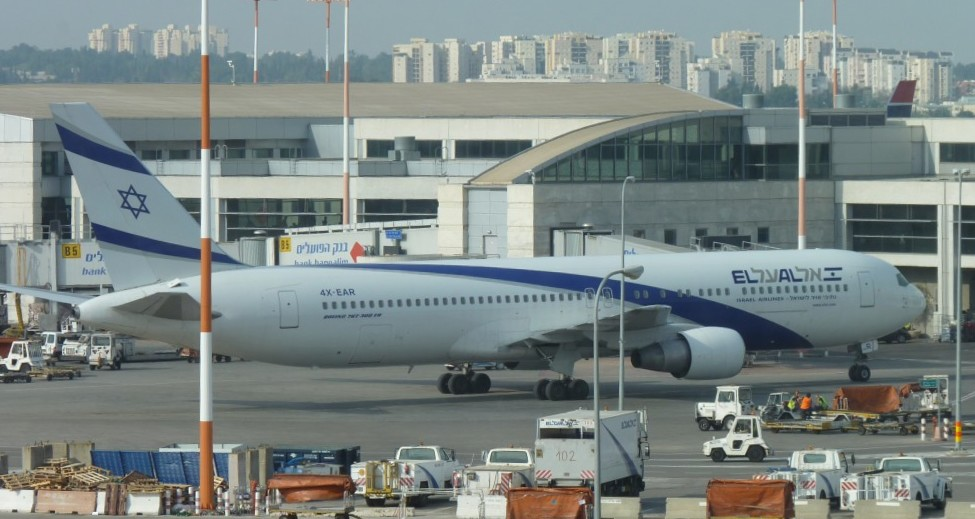
El Al at Ben Gurion Airport

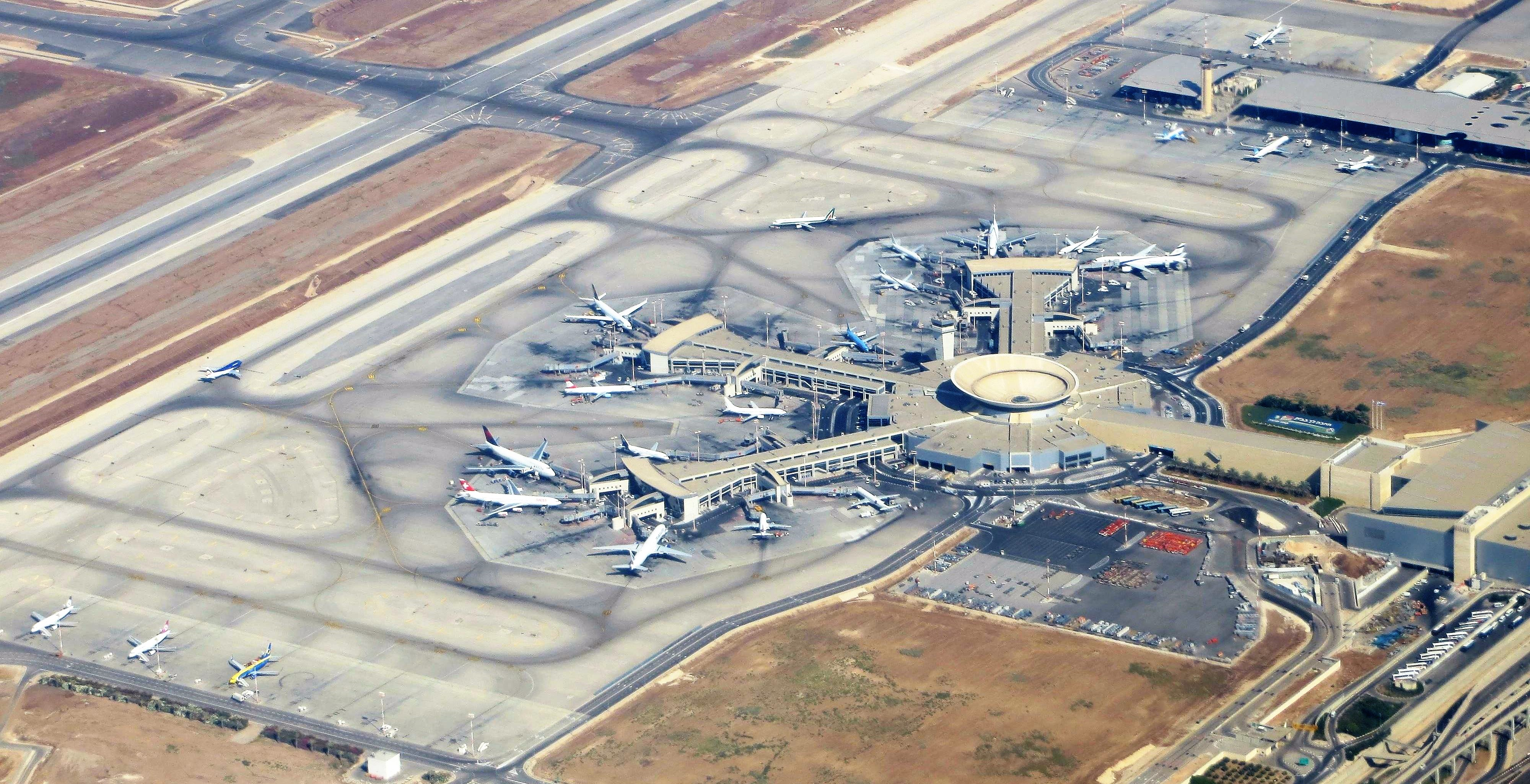
Aerial view of Ben Gurion Airport

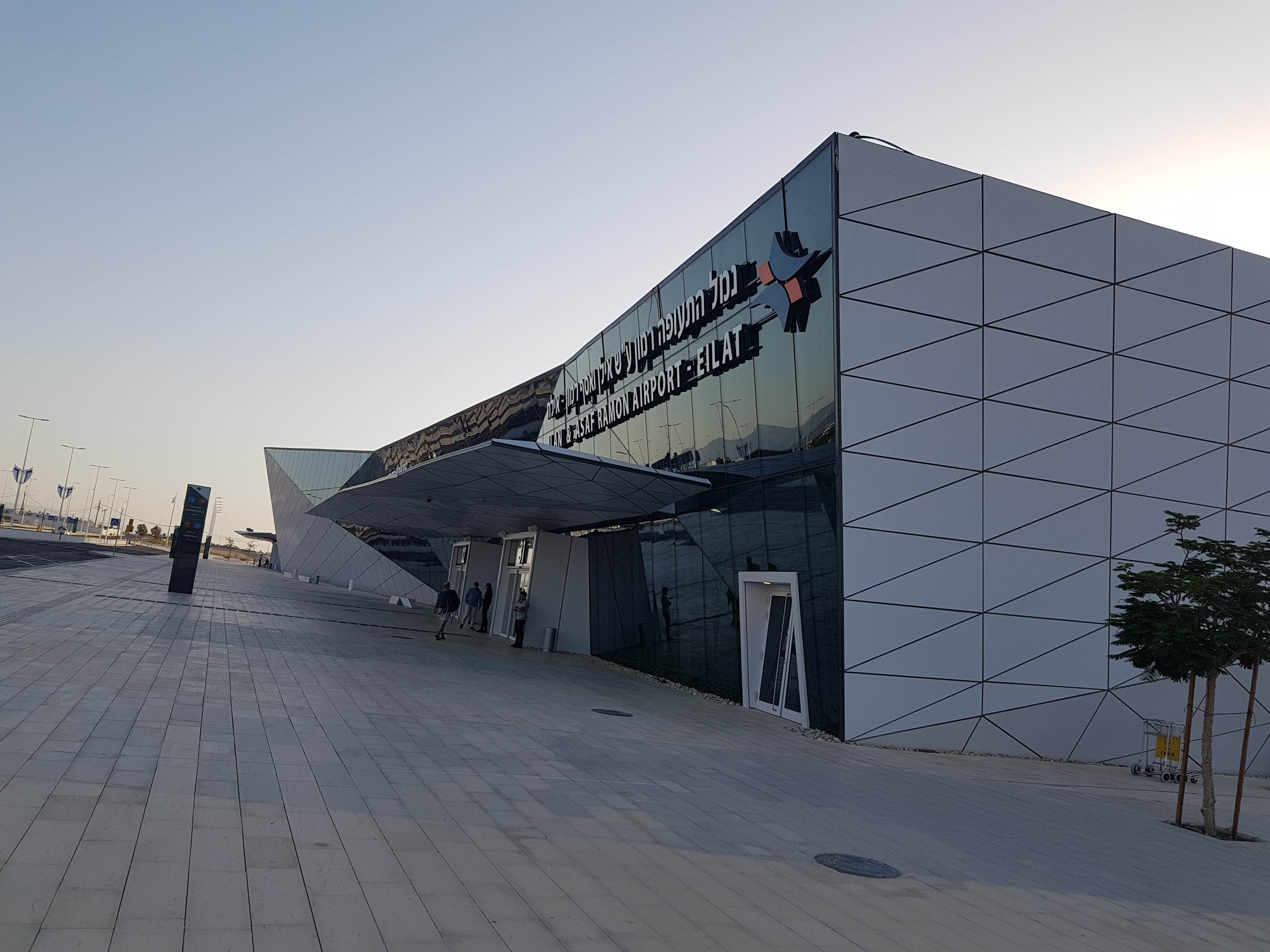
Terminal of Ramon Airport

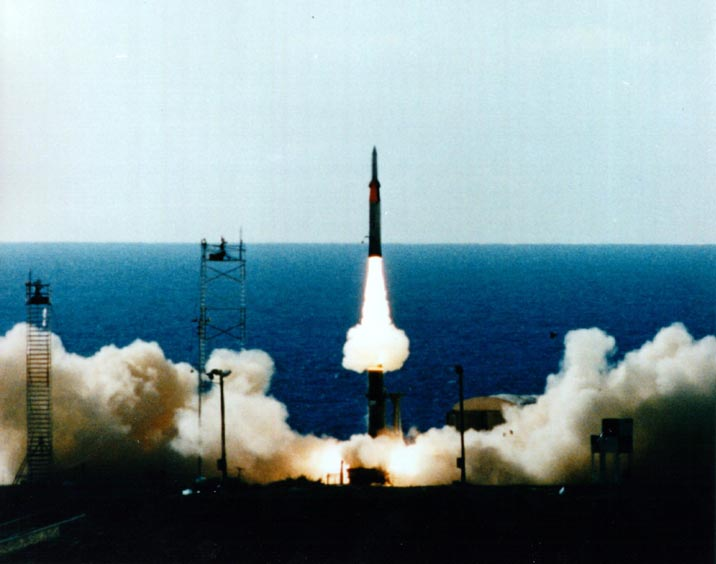
Test launch 1996 from Palmachim Airbase

== See also ==
- Transportation in Israel
- List of airports by ICAO code: L#LL – Israel
- Wikipedia: Airline destination lists: Asia#Israel
- List of the busiest airports in the Middle East
