= List of airlines of Israel =

This is a list of airlines currently operating in Israel.

== Scheduled airlines ==
=== International and domestic ===
Airline	Image	IATA	ICAO	Callsign	Commenced operations
Air Haifa		E2	HFA	Air Haifa	2024
Arkia		IZ	AIZ	ARKIA	1950
El Al		LY	ELY	EL AL	1948
Israir		6H	ISR	ISRAIR	1989

=== Domestic ===
Airline	Image	IATA	ICAO	Callsign	Commenced operations
Ayit			AYT	AYIT	1985

== Cargo ==
Airline	Image	IATA	ICAO	Callsign	Commenced operations
Challenge Airlines		5C	ICL	CAL	1976, renamed in 2022

== Defunct ==
This is a list of defunct airlines from Israel.

Airline	Image	IATA	ICAO	Callsign	Commenced operations	Ceased operations	Notes
Aeroel Airways			ROL		1992	1999	
Aviron Aviation Company					1936	1947	
CAL Cargo Airlines				CAL	1976	2022	renamed Challenge Airlines IL
Chim-Nir Aviation			ETN	CHIMNIR	1991	2019	
Commercial Aviation Company					1939		
Elrom Airways		00	ELR	ELROM	1990	2012	
Israel Inland Airlines		IZ			1950	1980	Renamed/merged to Arkia
Jet Link			JEK	Jet Ops	1996		
Kanfei HaEmek				Knafei HaEmek	1989	1996	Renamed/merged to Israir Airlines
MAOF airlines		MG			1981	1985	
Palestine Airways					1934	1940	
Tamir Airways			TMI	TAMIRWAYS	2004	2007	
Up		LY	ELY	EL AL	2013	2018	Merged to El Al

== See also ==
- List of defunct airlines of Israel
- List of airports in Israel
- List of defunct airlines of Asia
- List of airlines
