= Transport in Beersheba =

The Israeli city of Beersheba occupies a central role in southern Israel. Because of its central position in the Negev it is situated on important national routes reaching down to the far southern port of Eilat. Be'er Sheva is also home to a population of 195,000, with an estimated metro population at over 500,000 making it one of the largest cities in Israel. Much of the cities high-tech industry is concentrated in the center of the city, with Industrial estates existing in the south of the city, both of these areas are thus extensively served.

== Air ==
Be'er Sheva is home to a small airfield, Be'er Sheva (Teyman) Airport. At present, the airfield has no commercial operations. It can be used for private flights. The airfield is operated by Ayit Aviation.

== Buses ==
Buses are the principal form of public transport within the city. The main operator is Dan Be'er Sheva, which operates 27 services, mainly originating in the Beersheba Central Bus Station.

The inter city bus service connects northwards to Jerusalem and Tel Aviv, westwards to Sderot and Ashkelon, eastwards to Arad and Dimona and southwards to Mitzpe Ramon and Eilat. Most of the inter-city bus services are operated by "Metropoline" bus company, while the rest are operated Dan BaDarom and Egged.

All intercity bus-service runs through the Beersheba Central Bus Station.

== Rail ==
Be'er Sheva is served by two railway stations, Be'er Sheva North Railway Station, opened in 1956 and renovated in 2005, and Be'er Sheva Center Railway Station, opened in 2000. Both are operated by National Rail carrier, Israel Railways, and are part of the Railway to Beersheba, which extends northwards to Tel Aviv, and Ben Gurion Airport, and south to Dimona, and the Dead Sea factories (for freight only). The Be'er Sheva North University station is the terminus of the line to Dimona. All stations of Israel Railways can be accessed from Beersheba using transfer stations in Tel Aviv and Lod. Until 2012, the railway to Beersheba used a slow single-track configuration with sharp curves and many level crossings which limited train speed. Between 2004 and 2012 the line was double tracked and rebuilt using an improved alignment and all its level crossings were grade separated. The rebuilding effort cost NIS 2.8 billion and significantly reduced the travel time from Tel Aviv and Haifa to Beersheba. The current travel time to Tel Aviv is approximately one hour though this is expected to be reduced in the future as Israel Railways adds faster rolling stock to its fleet. The Beersheba Light Rail, a light rail system for the city and outlying towns, is also planned.

== Road ==
Beersheba is a central hub of the southern Israel road network. Connected to Tel Aviv via Highway 40, the second longest highway in Israel, which passes to the east of the city and is called the Beersheba bypass because it allows travelers from the north to go to southern locations, avoiding the more congested city center. From west to east, the city is divided by Highway 25, which connects to Ashkelon, Sderot, and Ofakim and the Gaza Strip to the northwest, and Dimona to the east. Finally, Highway 60 connects Beersheba with Jerusalem and the Shoket Junction, and goes through the West Bank. On the local level, a partial ring road surrounds the city from the north and east, and Road 406 (Reger Blvd.) goes through the city center from north to south, tracing the old route of the route 40 before the opening of the Be'er Sheva bypass. Highway 40 rejoins it to the south of the city.
