= LGT =

LGT may refer to:

- LGT Group, royal family-owned private banking and asset management company
- Locomotiv GT, a Hungarian rock band
- Lateral gene transfer
- Last Generation Theology
- ICAO airline code of Longtail Aviation
