= Bucharest Constantin Brâncuși Airport =

Planned Romanian airport

Bucharest Constantin Brâncuși Airport Aeroportul Constantin Brâncuși București
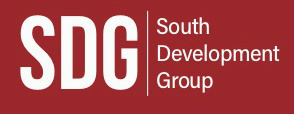
- IATA: TBA; ICAO: TBA

Summary
- Airport type: Public / Cargo
- Owner: South Development Group
- Serves: Bucharest, Romania
- Location: Bucharest
- Website: southdevelopmentgroup.com

Runways
Direction	Length		Surface
Direction	ft	m	Surface
R1	13,123	4,000
R2	13,123	4,000

Statistics (2024)
- Passengers: 12,000,000 (estimated)

Bucharest Constantin Brâncuși Airport/Bucharest South Airport (Romanian: Aeroportul Constantin Brâncuși/Aeroportul București Sud) is a proposed new facility to support the existing Otopeni Airport. In June 2018 Romania's Government adopted a strategic investment package including a proposal for construction of Bucharest Constantin Brancusi Airport/Bucharest South Airport.

The airport is named after Romanian artist Constantin Brâncuși, a famous Romanian sculptor, painter and photographer who made his career in France. The new airport is planned to be constructed on an area of up to 600 hectares (1,500 acres), equipped with at least two terminals and have a capacity of around 30 million passengers p/a, supporting Bucharest Otopeni Airport as an alternative international airport both in terms of passenger and freight operations. Airport ground access will be provided through the new Bucharest-Alexandria-Craiova highway and new Bragadiru-Unirii Square subway station projects. The investment package is to be prepared and awarded under a public-private partnership by the National Commission for Strategy and Forecasting.

== History ==
In November 2019 Abu Dhabi Airports announced the signing of a MoU with South Development Group for the development of Bucharest Constantin Brâncuși Airport.

== Terminals ==
The airport is projected with at least 5 terminals, which are planned to be constructed in 3 phases.

== Future development ==
The airport plans a second 4,000 m (13,000 ft) runway in addition to the existing 4,000 m (13,000 ft) runway.

The airport targets to become an important cargo hub in Eastern Europe. The cargo terminal will be built in collaboration with Liège Airport.
