= LLKS =

LLKS may refer to

- Kiryat Shmona Airport (ICAO code: LLKS)
- Union of Lithuanian Freedom Fighters (Lietuvos laisvės kovos sąjūdis)
