= Challenge Airlines =

Israeli cargo airline

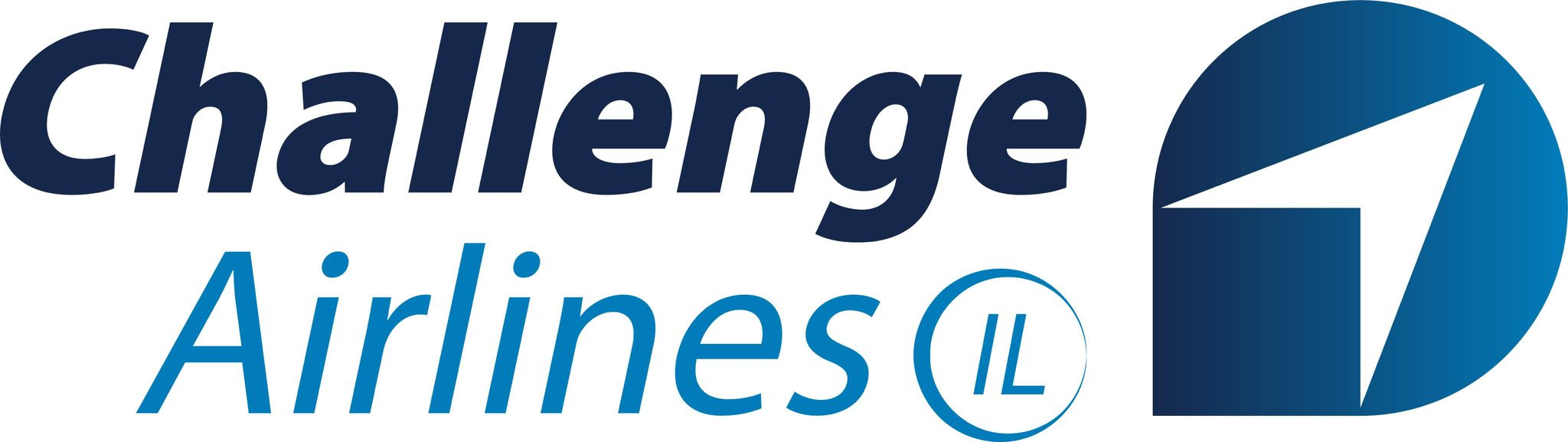
IATA	ICAO	Call sign
5C	ICL	CAL
- Founded: 1976; 50 years ago
- Hubs: Ben Gurion International Airport, Tel Aviv; Liège Airport, Belgium
- Fleet size: 3
- Destinations: 4
- Headquarters: Ben Gurion International Airport, Israel
- Website: https://www.challenge-group.com/

Challenge Airlines, formerly CAL Cargo Airlines Ltd. (Hebrew: ק.א.ל. קווי אוויר למטען), is a cargo airline with its corporate headquarters in Shoham, Israel.

== History ==
CAL was established in June 1976, starting charter operations in November of that year. Originally, the airline leased aircraft from El Al as required; however, on 1 December 1999, it began operating scheduled services using its own aircraft following receipt of Israeli government licences.

In 1997, CAL purchased the Liège Airport Cargo Handling Services (LACHS) cargo terminal in Belgium. The facility, which is still fully owned and operated by CAL, caters to CAL's specialty in nonstandard cargo. In 2010, CAL was purchased privately by Offer Gilboa and expanded its flight operations to include daily flights to and from Tel Aviv's Ben Gurion Airport and New York's John F Kennedy International Airport.

The new name Challenge Airlines was adopted in 2016. In 2017, the airline made news headlines for buying a Boeing 747 on Chinese e-commerce website Taobao.com for around US$23.3 million.

== Operations ==
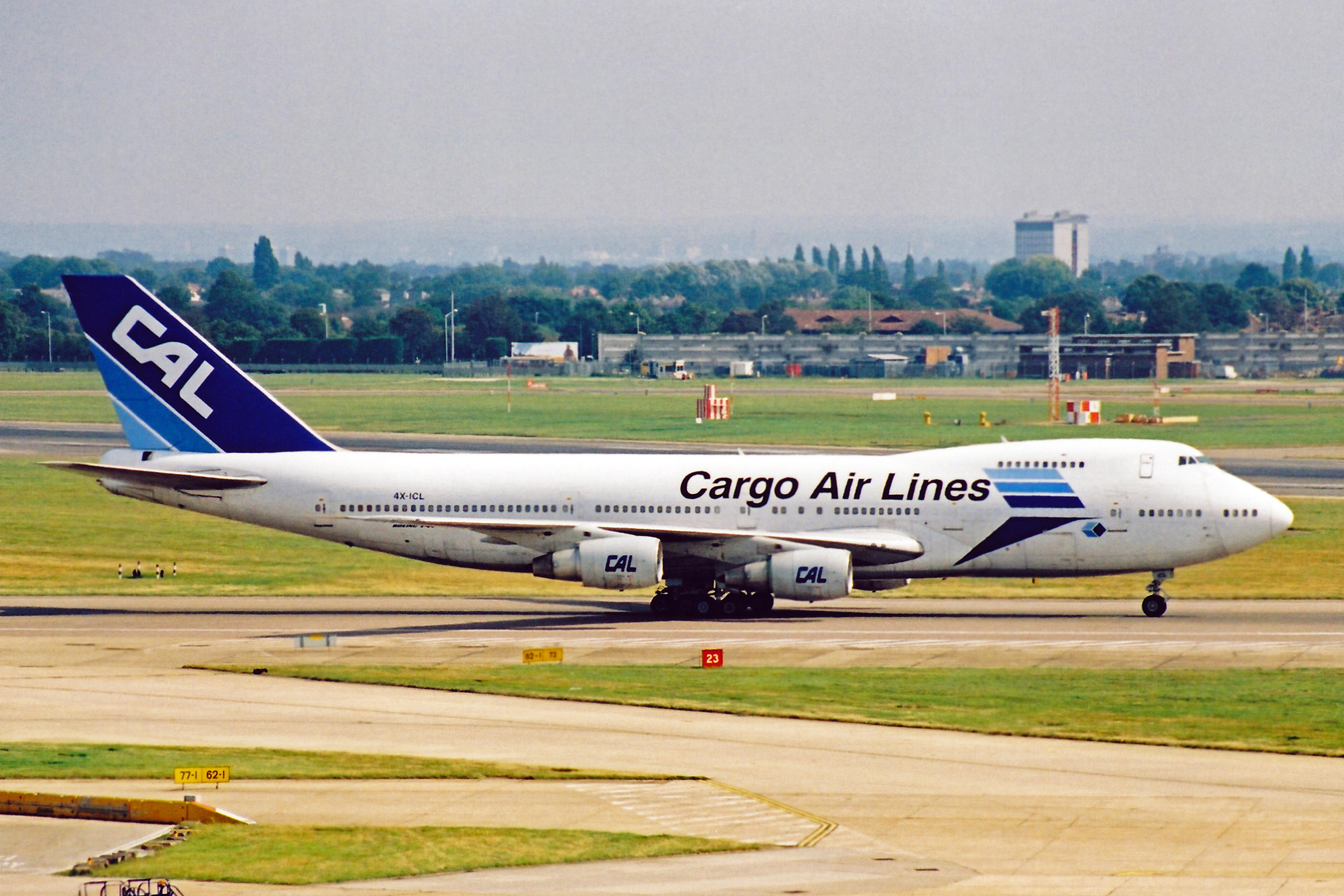
Cargo Airlines Boeing 747 at London Heathrow

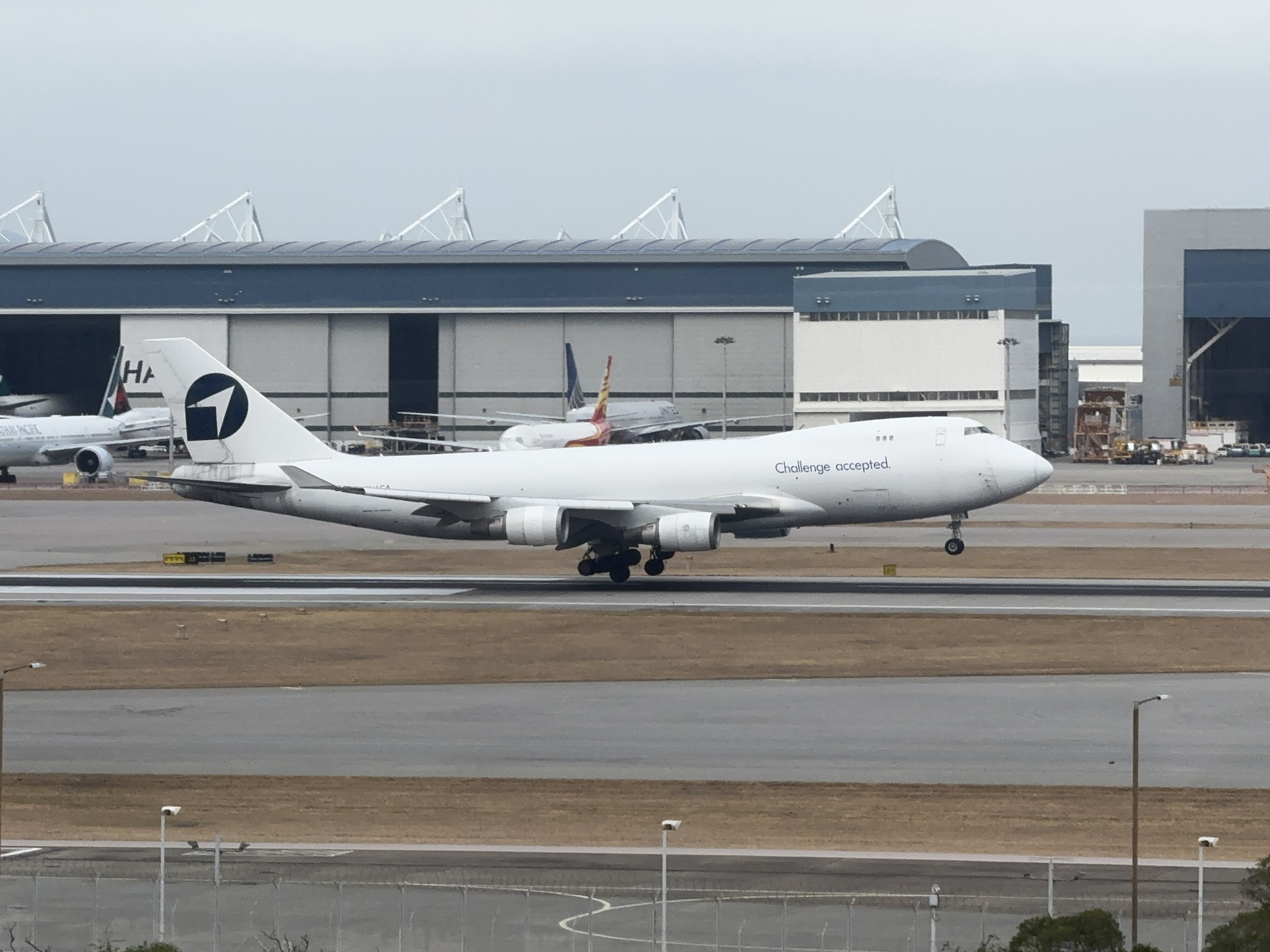
CAL 747-400ERF 4X-ICA on short final to Hong Kong International Airport

Challenge IL operates daily scheduled cargo flights and charter services carrying nonstandard goods and general cargo internationally. Its main base is Tel Aviv's Ben Gurion Airport and it has a hub at Liège Airport in Belgium. The airline carries approximately 100,000 tons of cargo annually, including all categories of nonstandard cargo: temperature-controlled pharmaceutical and healthcare products, live animals, dangerous goods, oversize and overweight cargo, fresh perishable products, and valuable goods such as fine art. The company slogan is Challenge accepted.

== Controversies and military shipments to Israel ==
In May 2024, four Belgian NGOs (Amnesty International, the National Coordination for Action for Peace and Democracy, the Human Rights League and Vredesactie) published allegations that Challenge Airlines was transporting military arms from the United States to Israel, transiting through Liège Airport. The report cited ten flights that allegedly transited through Liège Airport between 7 November 2023 and 4 March 2024, each carrying several dozen tons of ammunition components for small arms, detonators, and parts for F-35 and F-16 fighter jets. This investigation prompted a decree from the Wallonian government to prohibit all transit of weapons - with or without transshipment - to Israel.

Challenge Airlines subsequently tried to appeal against the ban, and while it won the legal challenge, the prohibition on transits remained in place due to a subsequent Royal Decree from the Federal Minister of Mobility.

In April 2026, during Israel's war against Iran, Challenge Airlines was also named as being the carrier of two separate consignments that were being shipped from the United Kingdom to Israel via Belgium, in breach of the arms embargo. In this case the shipments comprised military aircraft components from the Wolverhampton factory of Moog Inc., the US weapons manufacturer, and fire control / laser targeting equipment from Elbit Systems. The shipments were seized by Belgian customs official at Bierset airport in Liège, and a criminal investigation initiated.

In November 2026, investigative outlet The Intercept reported that Challenge Airlines had been transporting extensive volumes of components for bombs and munitions from the United States to Israel via John F. Kennedy International Airport. According to the article, parts for BLU-109 2,000 lb bombs and precision guidance kits for Joint Direct Attack Munitions, or JDAMs, had been shipped over an 18-month period from December 2024 to June 2026.

== Destinations ==
Challenge IL operates freight services to the following scheduled destinations (as of May 2024).

Country	City	Airport	Notes	Refs
Belgium	Liège	Liège Airport	Hub	
China	Zhengzhou	Zhengzhou International Airport		
Hong Kong	Hong Kong	Hong Kong International Airport		
Norway	Oslo	Oslo Gardermoen Airport		
Israel	Tel Aviv	Ben Gurion Airport	Hub	

Malta-based Challenge Airlines MT received its AOC in 2022 and in the following year was delivered the first Boeing 767-300F. The fleet currently consists of two Boeing 767-430Fs.

ACE Aviation (ACE Air Cargo Europe) was established in 2016. In the month of April of the following year all ground operations were transferred to ACE Belgium Freighters S.A.. It received its AOC in 2019 and flight operations started in the month of May with Boeing 747-400F transferred from the main airline. On June 16, 2020, the corporate name was changed to Challenge Airlines (BE) S.A. The fleet currently consists of three Boeing 747-400Fs

== Fleet ==
=== Challenge Airlines IL ===
As of July 2026, Challenge Airlines IL operates the following aircraft:

Challenge Airlines IL fleet
Aircraft	In fleet	Orders	Notes
Boeing 747-400ERF	1		
Boeing 747-400F	1		
Boeing 767-300BDSF	1		
Total	3		

=== Challenge Airlines MT ===
As of July 2026, Challenge Airlines MT operates the following aircraft:

Challenge Airlines MT fleet
Aircraft	In fleet	Orders	Notes
Boeing 767-300BDSF	3		
Boeing 777-300ERSF	1		
Total	4		

=== Former fleet ===
As of August 2025, Challenge Airlines IL operated 2 Boeing 747-400ERF, 2 Boeing 747-400F, 3 Boeing 767-300BDSF and 1 Boeing 777-300ERSF

Challenge Airlines IL historic fleet
Aircraft	Total	Year introduced	Year retired	Replacement	Notes	Refs
Boeing 707	1	1986	1987	Boeing 747-200F		
Boeing 747-100F	1	1993	1993	None	Leased from Atlas Air	
Boeing 747-200F	4	1999	2017	Boeing 747-400F	One aircraft was written off in a landing accident in Liège Airport.	
Boeing 747-400BCF	1	2016	2019	None	Transferred to Challenge Airlines BE.	
Boeing 747-400ERF	2	2019	2022	None	Transferred to Challenge Airlines BE.	

== See also ==
- List of airlines of Israel
- Economy of Israel
