= Israel Tal =

Israeli general (1924–2010)

- Israel Tal
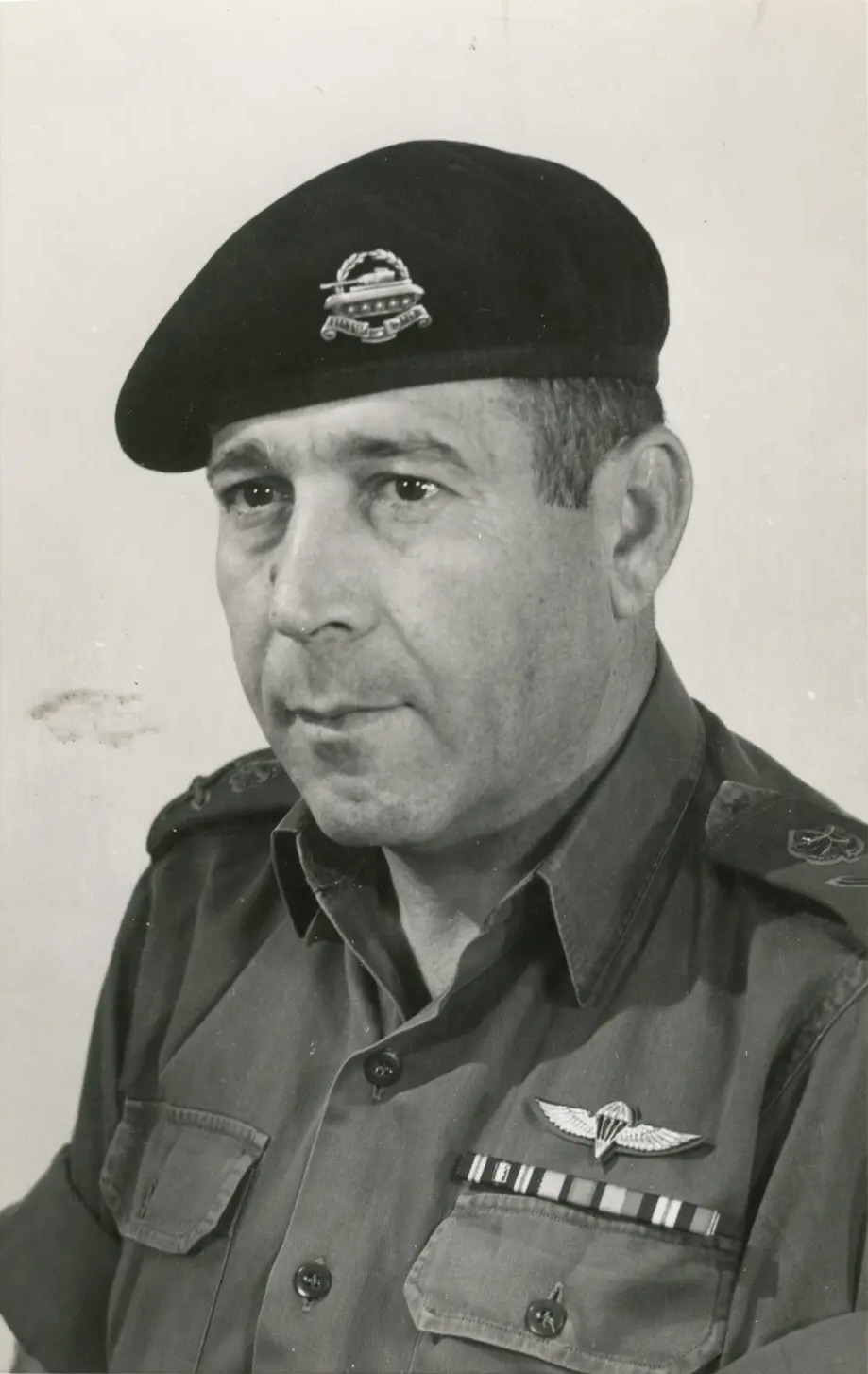
- Born: 13 September 1924; Mahanayim, Mandatory Palestine
- Died: 8 September 2010 (aged 85); Rehovot, Israel
- Military career
- Allegiance: Israel
- Branch: Israel Defense Forces
- Service years: 1943–74, 1979–89
- Rank: Aluf (Major General)
- Nicknames: Talik, Mr. Armour
- Commands: Bahad 1-IDF Officers School (1954–56), 7th Armored Brigade (1959–60), Commander of the Armored Forces (Gaysot Hashiryon), 84th Armored Division, Deputy Chief of the General Staff
- Conflicts: World War II, 1947–1949 Palestine war, Sinai War, Six-Day War, Yom Kippur War
- Awards: Israel Security Award (1961, 1973); Israel Prize (1997)

Israel Tal (Hebrew: ישראל טל; 13 September 1924 – 8 September 2010), also known as Talik (Hebrew: טליק), was an Israel Defense Forces (IDF) general known for his knowledge of tank warfare and for leading the development of Israel's Merkava tank.

== Biography ==
Tal was born in Mahanayim, Mandatory Palestine. On his mother's side he was descended from Hasidic Jews who migrated to Safed and Tiberias in 1777. He lived in Safed from the age of five and survived the 1929 Palestine riots. Later he lived in moshav Be'er Tuvia. He was expelled from school when he was in the ninth grade due to his rambunctious behavior, as he was always playing war games with his friends.

Tal began his military service at the age of 17, when he enlisted in the British Army during World War II, serving in North Africa and Italy. He served with the Palestine Regiment and then with the Jewish Brigade after its establishment, and was a machine gunner. After being discharged in 1946, he joined the Haganah. He served as a junior infantry officer during the 1947–1949 Palestine war, as a brigade commander during the 1956 Sinai War, an armored-division commander in Sinai Peninsula during the Six-Day War, and commander of the southern front during the final stages of the Yom Kippur War.

Israel Tal died in Rehovot on 8 September 2010.

== Military career ==
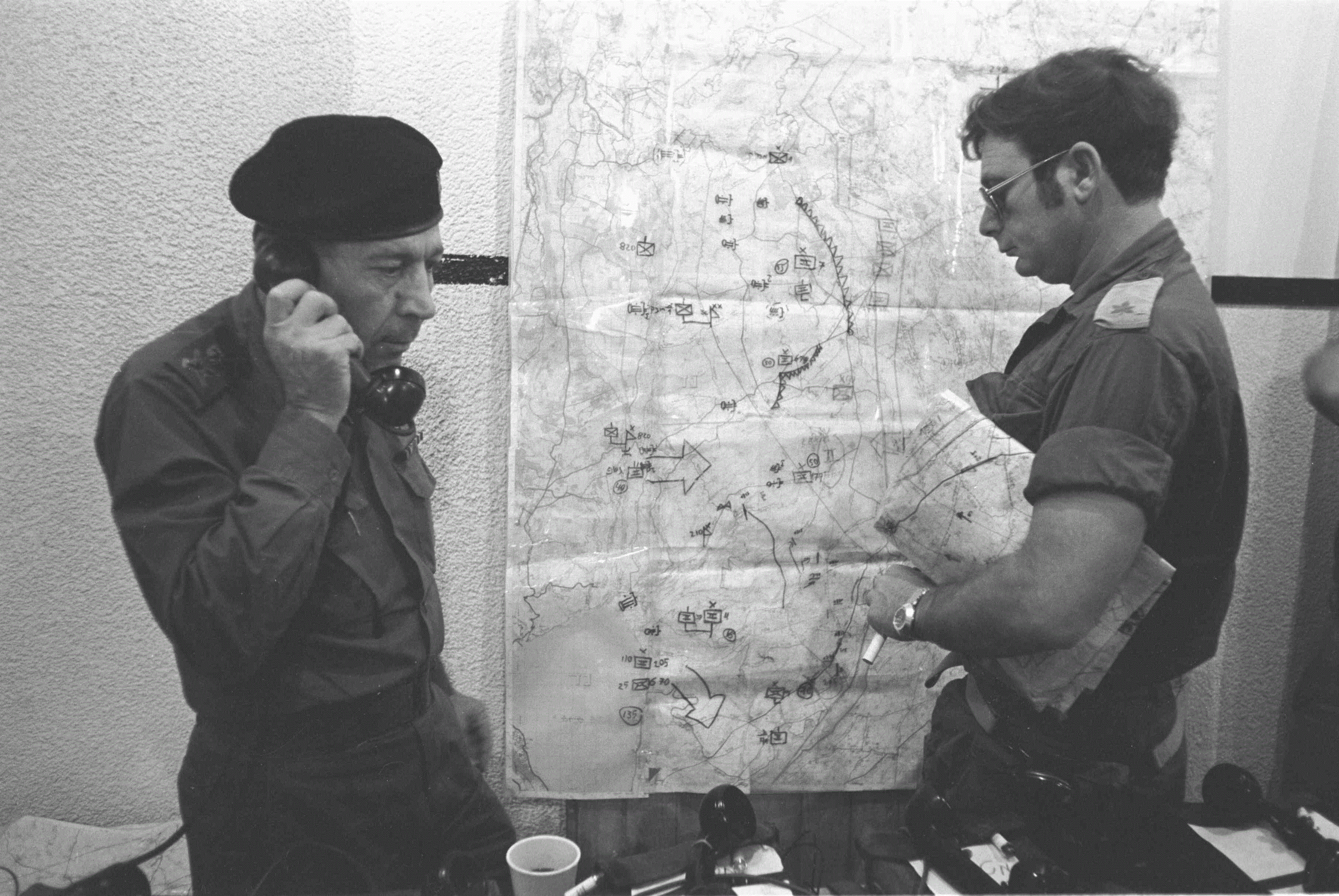
Tal (left) during the Yom Kippur War

Tal, who had been a hero of the Six-Day War, was an early opponent of the Bar Lev Line. He and General Ariel Sharon argued that it would not succeed in fending off Egyptian forces. After the official end of the Yom Kippur War, Tal, serving as commander of the southern front, received an order from Chief of Staff General David Elazar and Defense Minister Moshe Dayan to attack Egyptian forces. Tal refused to follow the order, insisting that it was an unethical order and requesting authorization for the requested attack from the Prime Minister and the Supreme Court. Such authorization never came. Tal won the argument, but his refusal to follow the order as a practical matter eliminated his chance of being nominated for the position of Chief of Staff to succeed General Elazar.

In 1970, the Israeli government decided it needed an independent tank-building capability due to the uncertainty of overseas sales for political reasons. Tal led a development team that took into consideration Israel's battlefield characteristics and lessons learned from previous wars, and began the development and building of Israel's Merkava tank.

== Armor doctrine ==
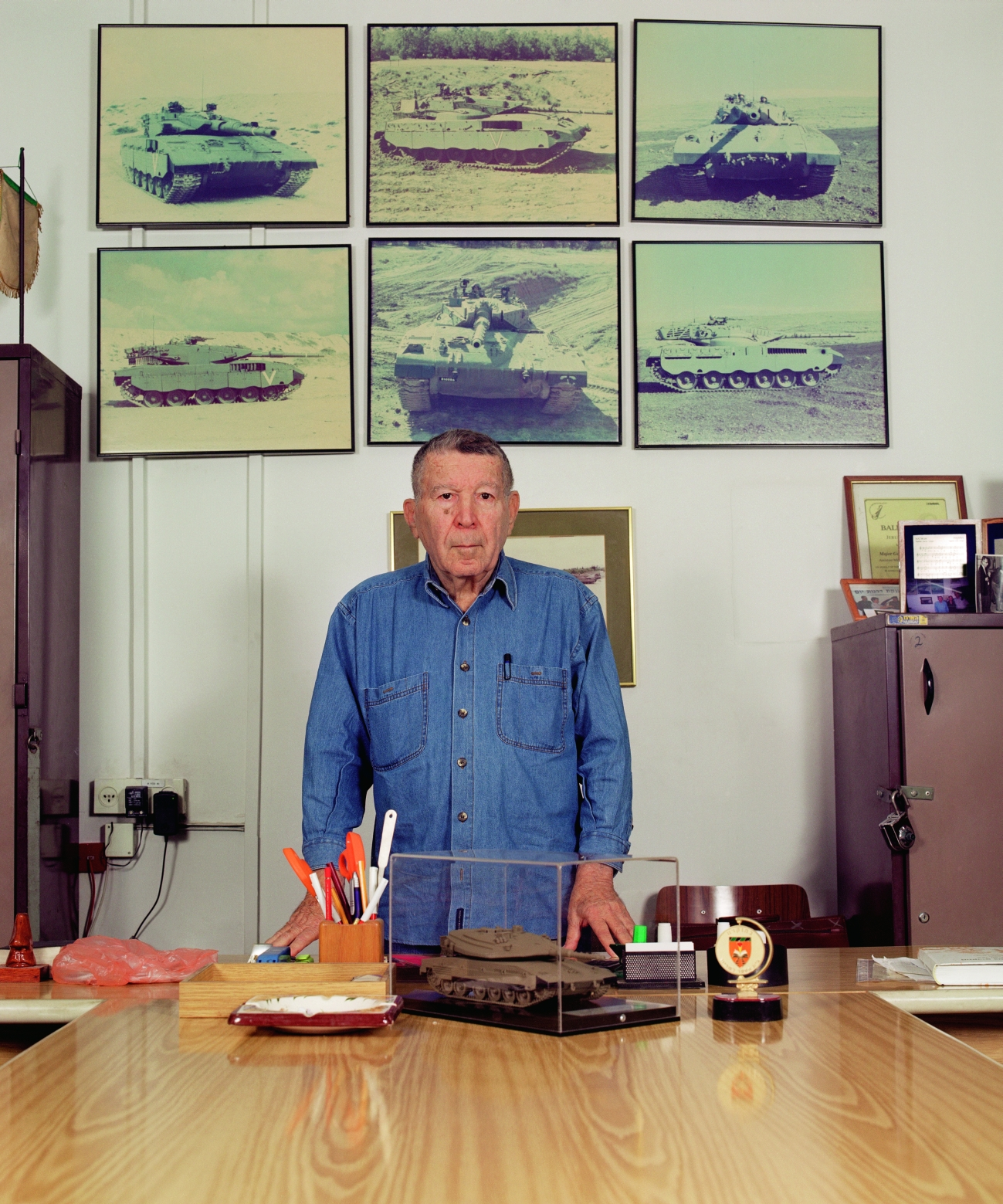
Tal with Merkava tank model, 2005

Tal was the creator of the Israeli armored doctrine that led to the Israeli successes in the Sinai surprise attack of the Six-Day War. In 1964, General Tal took over the Israeli armored corps and organized it into the leading element of the Israel Defense Forces, characterized by high mobility and relentless assault. He re-trained all Israeli gunners to hit targets beyond 1.5 kilometres (0.93 mi). In open terrain, such long-distance gunnery proved vital to the survival of the Israeli armored corps in subsequent wars. Israel's Arab opponents, especially Egypt and Syria, normally fired their Soviet-made tank guns from a distance of between 200 and 500 metres (220 and 550 yd), and quite often tank units advanced to within 100 metres (110 yd) of their targets before firing their main guns. This gave the Israelis an opportunity to exploit this weakness in Arab military doctrine. Its mobility is considered comparable to the German Blitzkrieg and many hold it to be an evolution of that tactic. Tal's transformation and success in 1967 led the IDF to expand the role of armor. However, this resulted in reduced attention to other less glamorous, but essential aspects of the army, such as the infantry. Following the 1973 surprise attack, this excessive focus on fast-striking offensive armor left the IDF temporarily without adequate defensive capability. Only in the latter stages of the war (with the aid of a US$1.1 billion airlift, Operation Nickel Grass) did the armor break out and show its potential; General Avraham Adan's armor broke through the Egyptian lines, crossed the Suez Canal and enveloped the Egyptian 3rd Army near Suez. While the IDF has become a more balanced force since 1973, Tal's development of armored doctrine has been very important to the IDF and has influenced armored doctrines in other parts of the world.

== Awards and honours ==
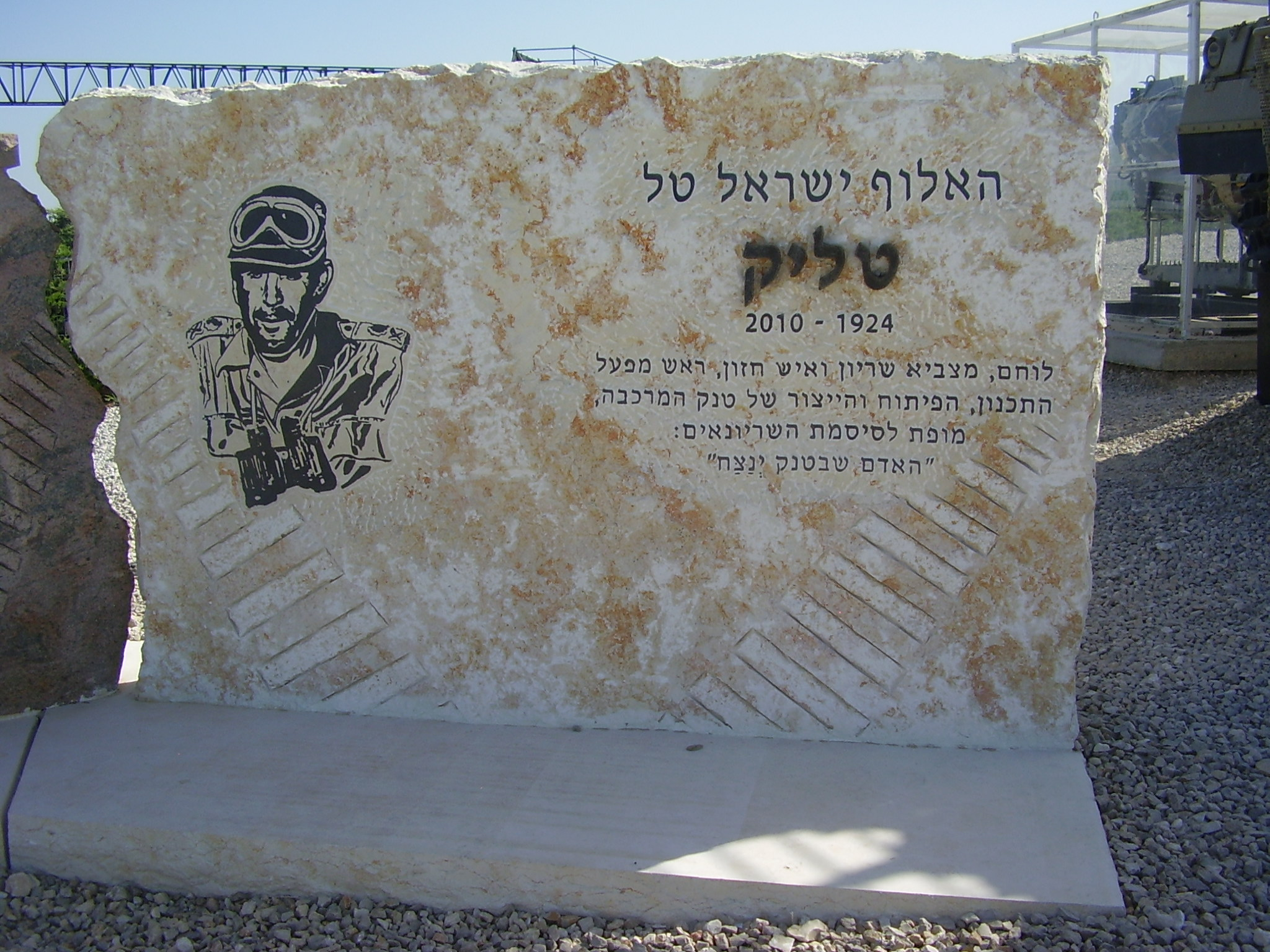
Major-General Israel Tal memorial in Latrun

Israel Tal was awarded the Eliyahu Golomb Israel Security Award in 1961 and 1973. In 1997, Tal was awarded the Israel Prize for his special contribution to the society and State of Israel.

In 1991, he received an honorary doctorate at Ben-Gurion University of the Negev. In 2002, he was chosen "Knight of Quality Government" by the Movement for Quality Government in Israel in the "Military and Security" category. Israel Tal's picture appears in the Patton Museum of Cavalry and Armor's "Wall of Greatest Armor Commanders" along with compatriot Moshe Peled, Americans George S. Patton and Creighton Abrams and German Field Marshal Erwin Rommel.

== See also ==
- List of Israel Prize recipients
