= Tamir Airways =

Israeli domestic airline

IATA	ICAO	Call sign
-	TMI	TAMIRWAYS
- Founded: 2004
- Ceased operations: May 2007
- Hubs: Sde Dov Airport
- Secondary hubs: Rosh Pina Airport
- Fleet size: 2
- Headquarters: Tel Aviv, Israel
- Key people: Udi Tamir, CEO
- Website: tamir-air.co.il

Tamir Airways was an Israeli regional airline based in Tel Aviv.

== Destinations ==
The airline operated domestic scheduled and air taxi flights from Sde Dov Airport, Tel Aviv to Rosh Pina Airport as well as owning the rights to fly to the defunct Kiryat Shmona Airport. Tamir Airways also operated private international charter services from Sde Dov Airport and Ben Gurion International Airport in Tel Aviv to Europe and the Mediterranean region. On May 17, 2007, the airline announced that it would be stopping its scheduled domestic services due to a dispute with the Transport Ministry.
