= Longtail Aviation Flight 5504 =

2021 engine failure incident in the Netherlands

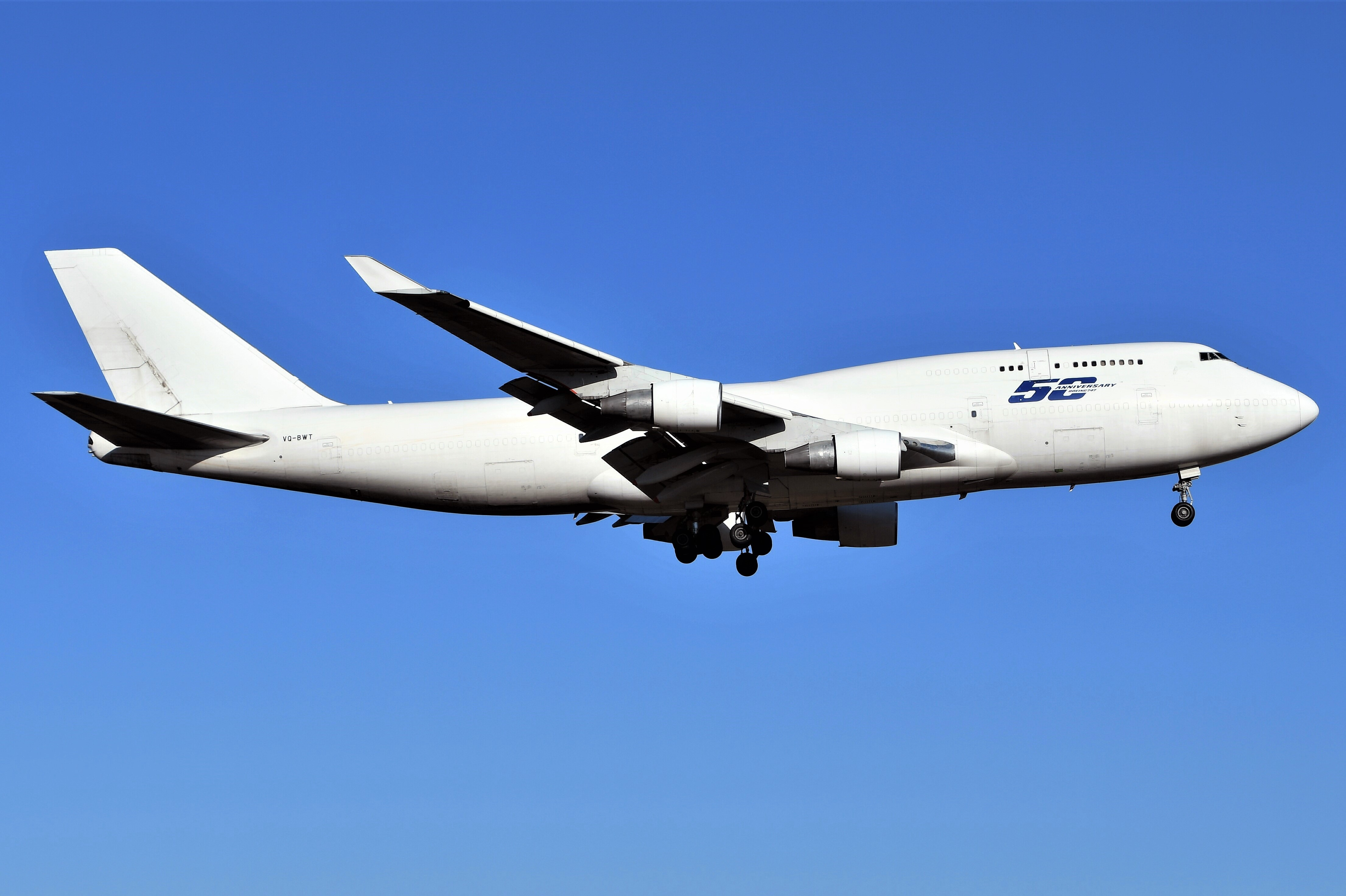
- VQ-BWT, the Boeing 747-400(BCF) involved, seen in March 2021 after its return to service

Incident
- Date: 20 February 2021
- Summary: Engine failure with parts detached from aircraft
- Site: Near Meerssen, Netherlands
- Total fatalities: 0
- Total injuries: 2 (on ground)

Aircraft
- Aircraft type: Boeing 747-412(BCF)
- Operator: Longtail Aviation
- IATA flight No.: 6T5504
- ICAO flight No.: LGT5504
- Call sign: LONGTAIL 5504
- Registration: VQ-BWT
- Flight origin: Maastricht Airport, Maastricht, Netherlands
- Destination: John F. Kennedy International Airport, New York, United States
- Occupants: 3
- Crew: 3
- Fatalities: 0
- Survivors: 3

Ground casualties
- Ground injuries: 2

On February 20, 2021, Longtail Aviation Flight 5504, an international cargo flight operated by Longtail Aviation from Maastricht, Netherlands, to New York, United States, suffered an engine failure shortly after departure that caused debris to fall to the ground near the Dutch town of Meerssen. Two people on the ground were slightly injured and there was property damage to buildings and cars. The Boeing 747-400 cargo plane diverted to Liege Airport with the failed engine shut down and landed there safely.

A criminal investigation was launched to determine if there was criminal negligence involved, but it was closed a month later with no finding of negligence. A separate aviation safety investigation was also launched by the Dutch Safety Board (DSB, OVV).

On the same day, United Airlines Flight 328, a Boeing 777-222, suffered similar circumstances over the United States. All 241 occupants onboard survived without injuries.

== Accident ==
At 16:11 local time, a Boeing 747-400BCF registered as VQ-BWT, operating as Longtail Aviation Flight 5504, experienced a nominally contained engine failure shortly after departing Maastricht Aachen Airport in the Netherlands in a southerly direction. Nevertheless, two people were injured by debris that also fell in a residential area. An elderly woman suffered a head injury that was treated at a hospital, and a child suffered burns after touching a piece of debris on the ground.

The converted freighter aircraft, originally delivered in 1991, was powered by four Pratt & Whitney PW4056-3 engines, a version of the earlier PW4000-94 engine. "A few seconds after the plane took off, air traffic control noted an engine fire and informed the pilots. They then switched off the engine concerned and sent out an emergency signal," according to Maastricht Aachen Airport. Metal parts of engine #1 (s/n P727441), believed to be turbine blades, came down in the Sint Josephstraat area of the village of Meerssen, approximately 2 km past the end of the runway.

The crew declared an emergency and diverted to land on the longer runway at Liège, Belgium, about 19 miles (31 km) south of the Dutch border. After entering a holding pattern over the Belgian Ardennes to dump fuel, the aircraft made a precautionary 3-engine landing without further incident.

Screenshot from local 1Limburg TV press interview, with damaged car and emergency response vehicle in background.

A local fire department representative reported that multiple witnesses on the ground saw the aircraft flying with an active engine fire. Video of a 747 in flight with smoke trailing from one engine was also posted to Twitter. Falling debris damaged parked cars, and press accounts of the incident included a widely circulated photo of the destruction showing what appears to be a part of an engine blade wedged in the roof of a car like a knife stuck in a block of butter. Maastricht Airport spokesperson Hella Hendriks told Reuters: "Several cars were damaged and bits hit several houses. Pieces were found across the residential neighbourhood on roofs, gardens and streets." Meerssen police publicly requested that possible fragments be left in place to aid the investigation, but later asked residents to turn in the parts. Local residents reportedly collected over 200 pieces of the engine after what some described as a "rain of debris." The blade-like parts were approximately 5 centimetres (2 in) wide and up to 25 centimetres (10 in) long.

== Investigation ==
The Dutch Safety Board (OVV) immediately started an exploratory investigation where researchers initially collected evidence to determine whether an extensive investigation is necessary. A spokeswoman for the OVV stated "We immediately started collecting debris on Saturday and are now also going to look at the aircraft itself." The Aviation Team of the Dutch national police also started an investigation to determine if there was criminal negligence, but they did not travel to Belgium to examine the aircraft, instead asking for assistance from their Belgian counterparts. The criminal negligence investigation was closed a month later finding no negligence or guilt.

Martin Amick, the CEO of Longtail Aviation, said, "we are now in the process of working closely with the Dutch, Belgian, Bermuda and UK authorities to understand the cause of this incident." CNN reported that Boeing technical advisers are supporting the U.S. National Transportation Safety Board with its investigation. The NTSB would be involved in the investigation since the Boeing 747 is built in the U.S.

Europe's EASA aviation regulator said it was aware of the two Pratt & Whitney jet engine incidents, and was requesting information on the causes to determine what action may be needed. After receiving more information, EASA said the Longtail and United incidents were unrelated: "Nothing in the failure and root analysis show any similarity (between the two incidents) at this stage."

The aircraft and cargo were released two days after the incident, but the OVV retained the damaged engine and the "black box" recorders. Longtail Aviation dispatched a replacement engine on another of their 747 freighters to facilitate the repairs necessary for return to service. The aircraft was returned to service and has been seen servicing Maastricht Airport.

The OVV's "Shortened Investigation" report concluded on April 19, 2023, with reports released in both Dutch and English, that the engine failure was caused by elevated gas temperatures that existed for an extended period of time in the turbine of the engine causing wear and deformation of outer transition duct panels. A service bulletin aiming to resolve this issue was not incorporated by the operator.

== See also ==
- United Airlines Flight 328
- Qantas Flight 32
- United Airlines Flight 1175
- Southwest Airlines Flight 1380
