= Yotvata Airfield =

Coordinates: 29°54′04″N 35°04′03″E

Yotvata Airfield מנחת יטבתה
- IATA: YOT; ICAO: LLYO

Summary
- Airport type: Public
- Location: Yotvata, Israel
- Elevation AMSL: 249 ft / 76 m
- Interactive map of Yotvata Airfield

Runways
Direction	Length		Surface
Direction	ft	m	Surface
02/20	3,346	1,020	asphalt

Yotvata Airfield (Hebrew: מנחת יטבתה) was a small desert airfield in south Israel 40 km north of Eilat adjacent to Kibbutz Yotvata. The runway is in a state of disrepair. In 2025, Yotvata airfield was considered “Permanently Closed” on Google Maps.

== See also ==
- Yotvata
- List of airports in Israel
