= Longtail Aviation =

Bermudian airline

IATA	ICAO	Call sign
6T	LGT	LONGTAIL
- Founded: 1999
- Hubs: L.F. Wade International Airport
- Fleet size: 9
- Headquarters: St. George's, Bermuda
- Key people: Anatoly Galunov, CEO
- Website: https://www.longtailaviation.com

Longtail Aviation is a charter airline based in St. George's, Bermuda and was formed in August 1999.

== Fleet ==
The fleet consisted of the following aircraft (as of June 2024):

- 2 Dassault Falcon 900B
- 1 Cessna Citation S/II
- 1 Beech King Air 350
- 1 Beech King Air 200
- 1 Boeing 737-700BBJ (as of August 2019)
- 2 Boeing 747-400F (as of December 2020)
- 3 Boeing 747-400M (as of June 2024, 1 aircraft stored, 2 scrapped)
- 1 Boeing 767-200F Reg. VP-BMA

== Incidents ==
- On 20 February 2021, a Longtail Aviation Flight 5504, a Boeing 747-412BCF registered as VQ-BWT, encountered an engine failure above the village of Meerssen, shortly after taking off from Maastricht Aachen Airport on the way to John F. Kennedy International Airport. Debris fell from the failed Pratt & Whitney PW4056 engine, injuring two people on the ground. The aircraft was able to land safely at Liège Airport.
