= List of airports by ICAO code: L =

Due to the size of this list, it has been split into two lists:

- List of airports by ICAO code: LA-LJ
- List of airports by ICAO code: LK-LZ
