= Kiryat Shmona Airport =

Kiryat Shmona Airport שדה התעופה קריית שמונה
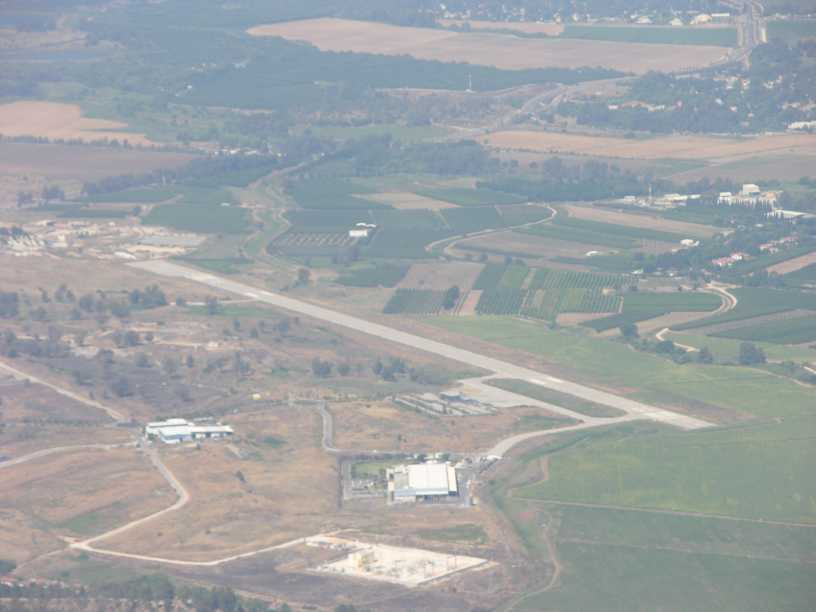
- IATA: KSW; ICAO: LLKS

Summary
- Airport type: Public
- Owner: Disputed
- Operator: Metailey Kiryat Shmona Inc.
- Serves: Kiryat Shmona
- Elevation AMSL: 376 ft (115 m)
- Coordinates: 33°13′00.00″N 35°35′48.00″E

Map
- Location within Northeast Israel Location within Israel

Runways
Direction	Length		Surface
Direction	ft	m	Surface
03/21	4,423	1,348	Asphalt

Kiryat Shmona Airport (Hebrew: שדה התעופה קריית שמונה) (IATA: KSW, ICAO: LLKS) is a public Israeli airport located 2 km east of the northern town of Kiryat Shmona. The airport is operated by Kiryat Shmona Travellers Inc.

== History ==
Its history was checkered based on lack of economic viability and local political differences. Arkia handled domestic flights until end of 2003, when it closed down due to a lack of passenger traffic. Now rights to fly a domestic route to and from the airport are held by Tamir Airways, while rights to operate the landing strip are owned by a separate company that is in a dispute with Tamir Airways. In 2006, the new airport terminal was opened. Tamir Airways announced that it would stop flying to Upper Galilee shortly before the Second Lebanon War broke out, but they changed their mind because they saw it as a "mission of national importance". Nevertheless, they ceased their (twice a day) flights to Sde Dov Airport on June 1, 2007. The next closest airport is Ben Ya'akov near Rosh Pina, 30 km south.

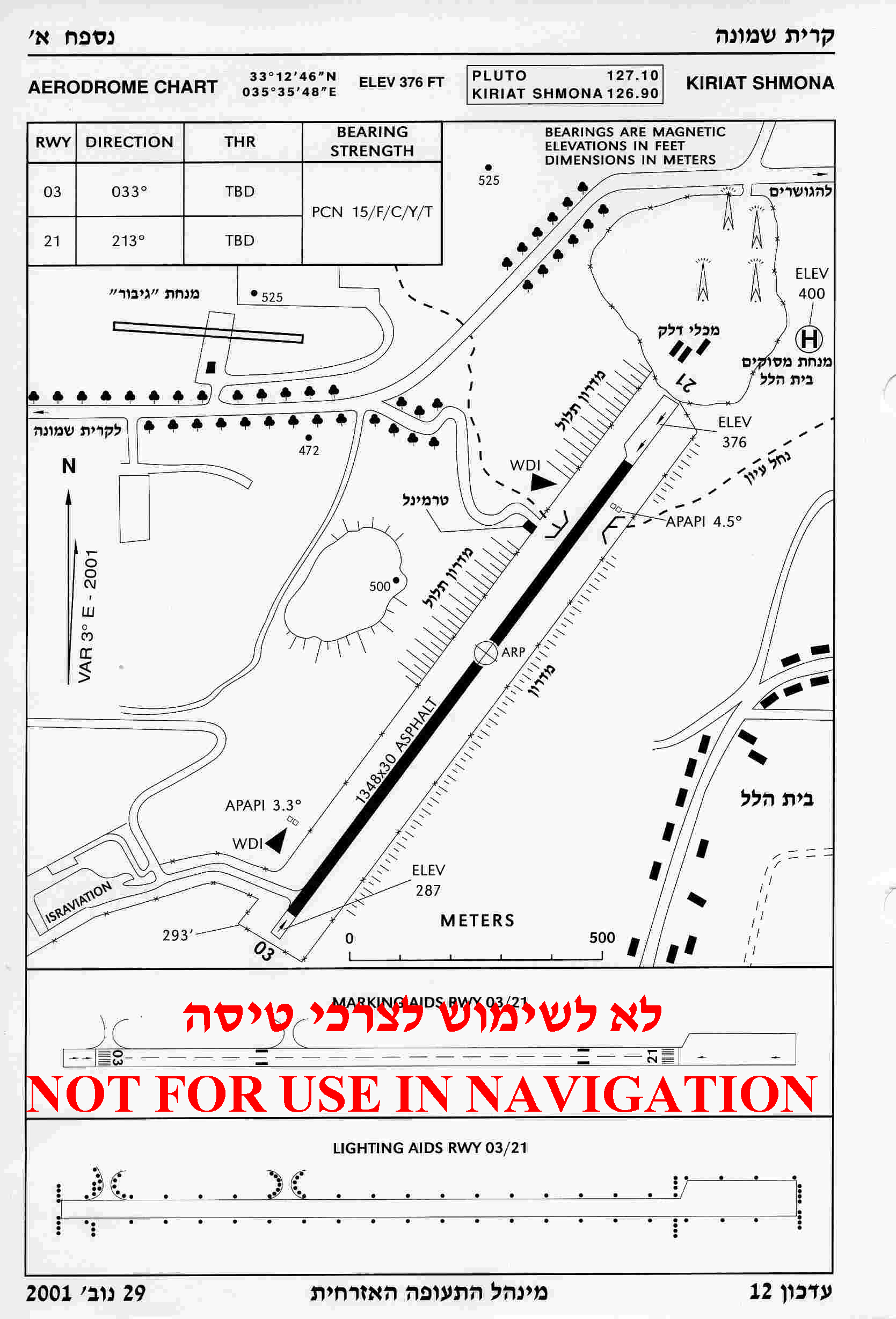
Kiryat Shmona Aerodrome chart

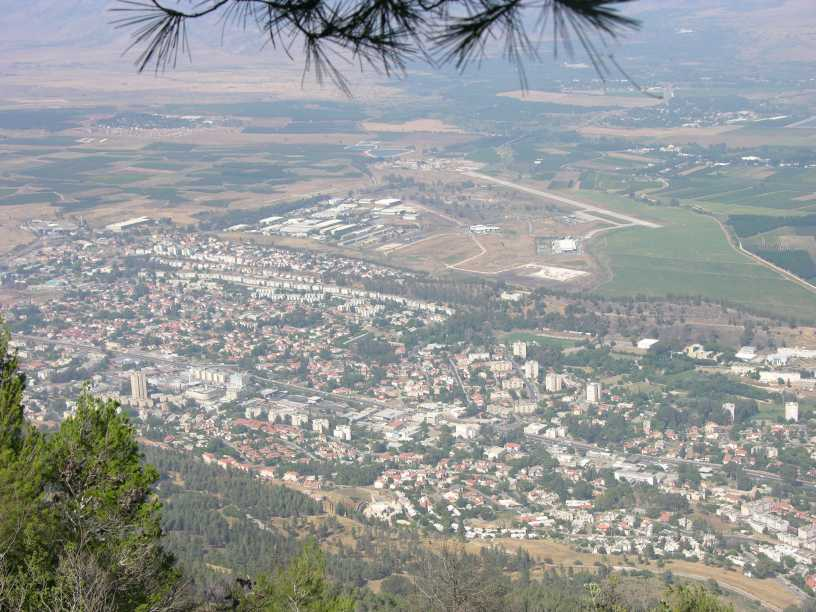
Kiryat Shemona and its airport in the background

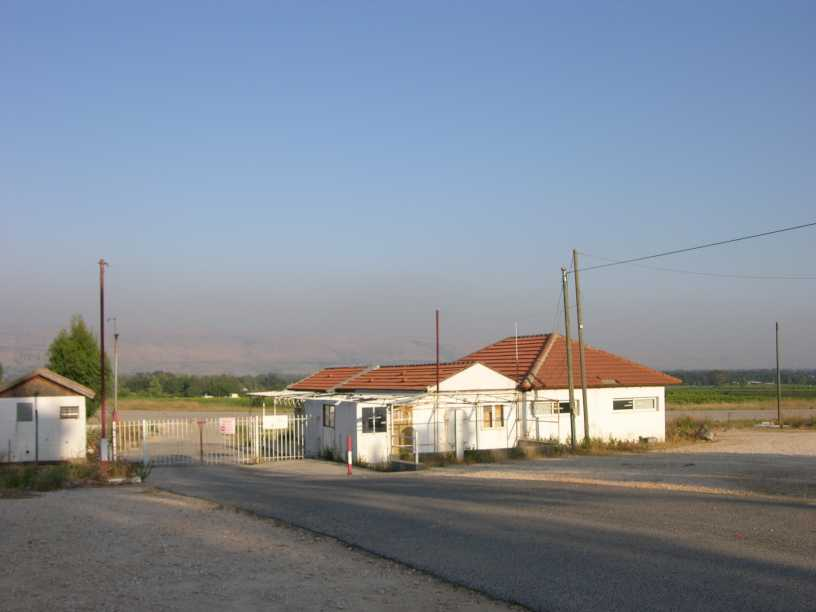
Old (previous) terminal, permanently closed

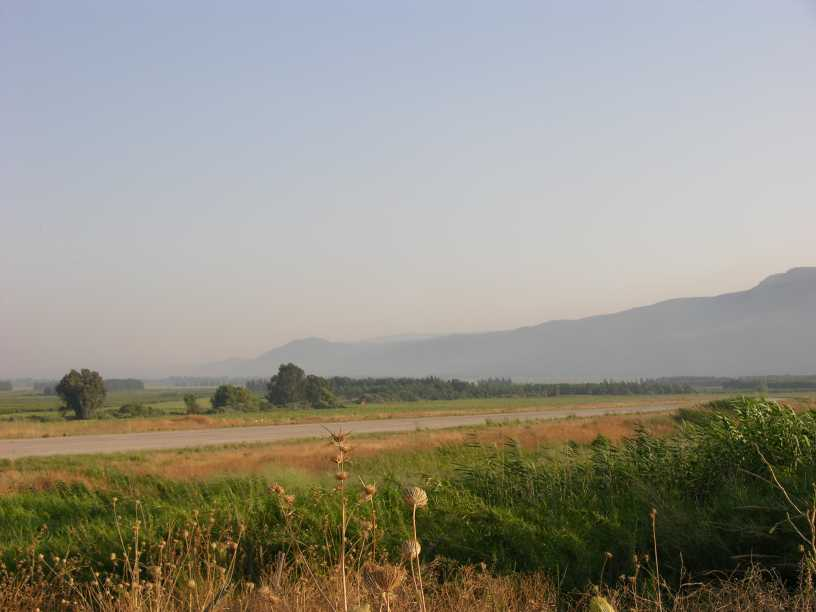
Runway 21 with Naftali hills in the background
