= Mahanayim =

Mahanayim: מחניים (Hebrew)
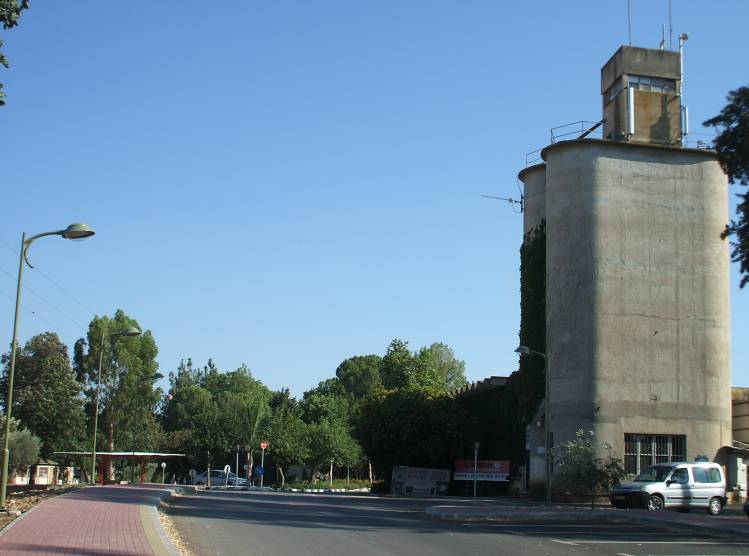

- Location within Northeast Israel Location within Israel
- Coordinates: 32°59′21″N 35°34′13″E
- Country: Israel
- District: Northern
- Subdistrict: Safed
- Council: Upper Galilee
- Affiliation: Kibbutz Movement
- Founded: 1898 (first establishment); 1916 (first re-establishment); 1939 (second re-establishment)
- Founder: Galician Jews (1898); Poale Zion members (1916); Yodfat members (1939)
- Population (2024): 860
- Website: www.kibm.co.il

Mahanayim (Hebrew: מחניים, מַחֲנַיִם) is a kibbutz in northern Israel. Located on the Korazim Plateau, around three kilometres northeast of Rosh Pinna, it falls under the jurisdiction of Upper Galilee Regional Council. In 2024 it had a population of 860.

== History ==
The land on which Mahanayim stands was purchased in 1892 by the Ahavat Zion (Love of Zion) Hovevei Zion organization, with the aim of establishing a moshava in the area. In 1898 a number of families from Galicia settled in the area, naming it Mahanayim after the biblical city in Gilead, where Jacob stayed before he met again with his brother Esau and saw angels, therefore calling it Mahanayim (camps) of God (Genesis 32:2). However, it was not a success, largely due to the settlers' lack of familiarity with the region, a shortage of money, and a lack of professionalism, resulting in the community disintegrating. The Jewish Colonization Association ran a trial of growing tobacco in the area, but it too was a failure, and the village was abandoned in 1912.

In 1916 a kvutza of Poale Zion members arrived in the area, establishing the first working settlement in the Upper Galilee. According to the 1922 census of Palestine by the British Mandate authorities, Mahanayim had a population of 30 Jews. In the same year it became a moshav, but was abandoned in 1928. The village was established for a third time in 1939 by members of kibbutz "Yodfat" from Safed.

Starting in 1979, the community's metalworks was used by Meir Dagan (later head of the Mossad) as a site to secretly assemble bombs to be used by proxies in the civil war in nearby Lebanon.

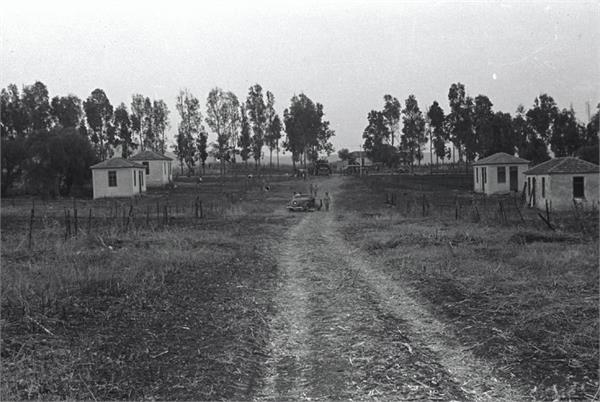
Mahanayim abandoned buildings 1939

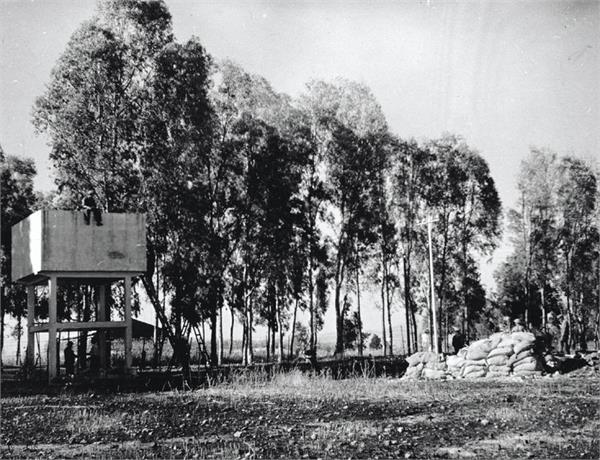
Mahanayim 1940

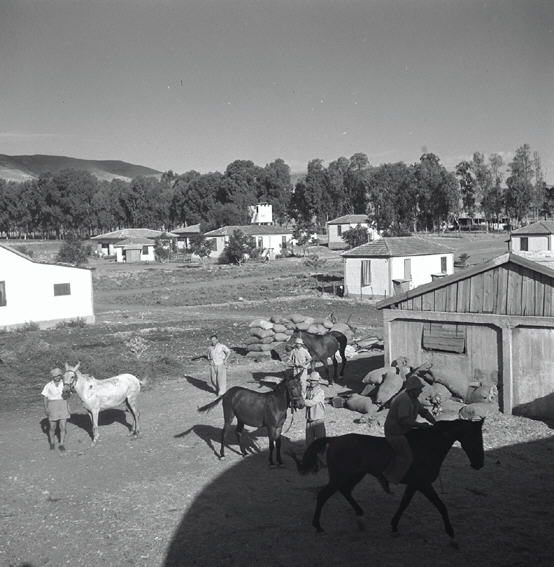
Mahanayim 1947

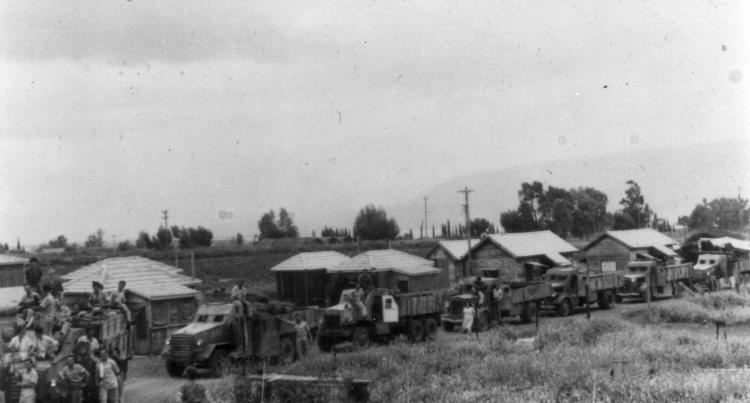
Convoy from Tiberias in Mahanayim in 1948

== Economy ==
Kibbutz Mahanayim operates a guesthouse offering alternative medical treatments. A sculpture studio and stained glass workshop on the grounds of the kibbutz are open to guests.

Ben Ya'akov Airport is located to the south of the kibbutz.

== Notable residents ==
- Israel Tal, IDF commander and pioneer in tank warfare.
- Meir Dagan (later head of the Mossad)
