= Ayit =

Israeli airline

Coordinates: 31°17′11.8″N 34°43′27.4″E

Ayit Aviation עיט שירותי תעופה ותיירות
IATA	ICAO	Call sign
-	AYT	AYIT
- Founded: 1985; 41 years ago
- Hubs: Be'er Sheva (Teyman) Airport
- Focus cities: Herzliya Airport; Ben Ya'akov Airport
- Fleet size: 8
- Destinations: 2 scheduled, 6 others chartered
- Headquarters: Beersheba, Israel
- Key people: Eli Peretz (President & CEO)
- Website: ayit.co.il

Ayit Aviation and Tourism (Hebrew: עיט שירותי תעופה ותיירות) is an Israeli domestic airline established in 1985 and reorganized in 2008.

== History ==
Ayit flew between Sde Dov Airport, near Tel Aviv, and Ben Ya'akov Airport near Rosh Pinna. As part of its agreement to operate the route, the airline agreed that IDF personnel would be allowed to fly from Tel Aviv to Rosh Pinna for free. 12,000 tickets were given to the Defense Ministry as a result.

A new route from the Rosh Pina Airport to Eilat Airport was announced in 2016. Due to the closure of Sde Dov Airport in 2019 the company no longer maintains flight routes to and from the airport

== Fleet ==
The Ayit fleet consists of the following aircraft:

Ayit Fleet
Aircraft	Total	Routes\Operations	Notes
Embraer ERJ 145ER	1	Domestic, International	(as of July 2026)
Embraer ERJ 145LR	2	Domestic, International	(as of July 2026)
Short 360	1	Domestic and short haul	Not active
Cessna 152	1	Domestic, Flight training	Not active
Cessna 172	3	Domestic, Flight training	
Cessna 206	1	Domestic	Not active
Cessna 414	1	Domestic	Not active
BN-2 Islander	1	Domestic	Not active
PA-31-350 Chieftain	1	Domestic	Not active
Piper PA-32	1	Domestic	Not active
Short SC.7 Skyvan	1	Skydiving	
Texan G10	2	Flight school	
DA-42 NG	1	Twin-engine training & air taxi	

== See also ==
- Aviation in Israel
