= Liège Airport =

Cargo airport serving Liège, Wallonia, Belgium

Liege Airport Luchthaven Luik Aéroport de Liège Flughafen Lüttich

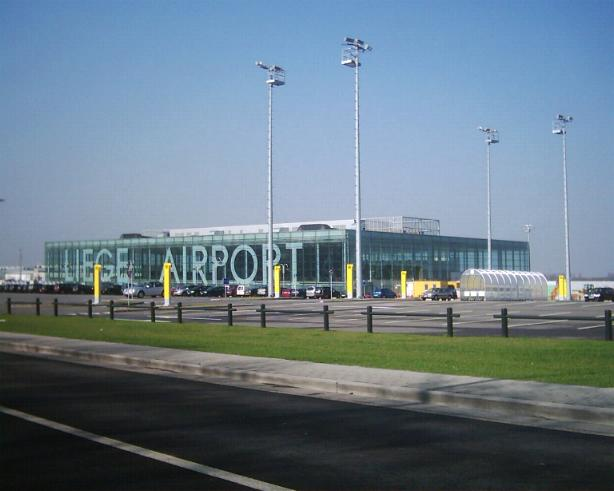
- IATA: LGG; ICAO: EBLG

Summary
- Airport type: Public
- Owner: Walloon government & private investors
- Operator: Liege Airport s.a.
- Serves: Liège
- Location: Grâce-Hollogne, Liège Province, Wallonia, Belgium
- Hub for: ASL Airlines Belgium; CAL Cargo Air Lines; CMA CGM Air Cargo; Ethiopian Cargo; FedEx Express; Qatar Airways Cargo
- Elevation AMSL: 651 ft (198 m)
- Coordinates: 50°38′11″N 005°26′34″E
- Website: www.liegeairport.com

Map
- Location in Belgium

Runways
Direction	Length		Surface
Direction	m	ft	Surface
04R/22L	3,690	12,106	Asphalt
04L/22R	2,340	7,677	Asphalt

Statistics (2018)
- Freight (tonnes): 871,000
- Passengers: 299,292
- Sources: Belgian AIP

Liege Airport (Note: Dutch: Luchthaven Luik; French: Aéroport de Liège; German: Flughafen Lüttich) (IATA: LGG, ICAO: EBLG), previously called Liege-Bierset Airport, (Note: Dutch: Luchthaven Luik-Bierset; French: Aéroport Liège-Bierset; German: Flughafen Lüttich-Bierset) is an international airport located in Grâce-Hollogne, 9 km (6 miles) west of the city of Liège, Wallonia, Belgium. The airport mainly focuses on air freight. At the end of 2021, freight traffic reached 1,412,498 tonnes (+26%). Liege Airport is now the 5th biggest cargo airport in Europe and the 22nd biggest in the world.

== Overview ==
The first terminal on the site opened in 1930.

The airport is mainly used for freight/cargo operations, but also serves a number of destinations for passengers (mainly charters). Liège is located in the centre of the golden triangle Paris – Amsterdam – Frankfurt that handles 66% of European freight, and 75% when taken together with London. In 2018, it was the seventh biggest cargo airport in Europe. Liège Airport is the biggest cargo airport in Belgium, and the third-biggest for passengers after Brussels Airport and Brussels South Charleroi Airport. It is the global hub of ASL Airlines Belgium (the former TNT Airways) and is also used by several other cargo carriers on a scheduled or irregular basis.

== Airlines and destinations ==
=== Passenger ===
As of the evening of 4 January 2026, there are no regular passenger flights on commercial airlines at Liège airport. In July 2025, TUI announced that, after 30 years of service, they would axe all flights from Liège. The last regular passenger flight was on 4 January 2026.

Airlines	Destinations

=== Cargo ===
Airlines	Destinations
Air Canada Cargo	Basel/Mulhouse, Toronto–Pearson
Air China Cargo	Hangzhou, Shanghai–Pudong, Ürümqi
ASL Airlines Belgium	Chicago–O'Hare, Halifax, Hangzhou, Jinan, New York–JFK, Shanghai–Pudong, Tokyo–Narita
Atlas Air	Almaty, Atlanta, Birmingham (AL), Chicago–O'Hare, Indianapolis, Mexico City–AIFA, Miami, Milan–Malpensa, Seoul–Incheon, Singapore, Stuttgart, Tel Aviv, Zaragoza
Beijing Capital Airlines	Nanchang
Challenge Airlines	Atlanta, Larnaca, Mexico City, New York–JFK, Oslo, Tel Aviv, Toronto–Pearson
China Cargo Airlines	Yantai
CMA CGM Air Cargo	Atlanta, Chicago–O'Hare, Hong Kong
Compass Cargo Airlines	Sofia, Zhengzhou
Ethiopian Cargo	Abidjan, Accra, Addis Ababa, Budapest, Chongqing, Copenhagen, Guangzhou, Hong Kong, Johannesburg–O.R. Tambo, Juba, Lagos, Miami, New York–JFK, Shanghai–Pudong, Zaragoza
FedEx Express	Indianapolis, Memphis, Oakland
FedEx Feeder	Copenhagen, Gothenburg, Munich, Milan–Malpensa, Nuremberg, Stuttgart, Vienna
Icelandair Cargo	Reykjavík–Keflavík
Magma Aviation	Abuja, Accra, Atlanta, Bamako, Brazzaville, Chicago–O'Hare, Douala, Dubai–Al Maktoum, Entebbe, Greenville/Spartanburg, Hong Kong, Johannesburg–O.R. Tambo, Kigali, Kinshasa–N'djili, Lagos, Lilongwe, Lusaka, Mumbai, Nairobi–Jomo Kenyatta, Niamey, Ouagadougou
MNG Airlines	Istanbul, New York–JFK, Toronto–Pearson
MSC Air Cargo	Atlanta, Indianapolis, Mexico City–AIFA, Seoul–Incheon
My Freighter Airlines	Zhengzhou
Network Aviation Group	Abuja, Accra, Bangui, Brazzaville, Dubai–Al Maktoum, Entebbe, Hong Kong, Lagos, Libreville, Luanda, Johannesburg–O.R. Tambo, Nairobi–Jomo Kenyatta, New York–JFK, Port Harcourt
Qatar Airways Cargo	Atlanta, Chicago–O'Hare, Doha, Houston–Intercontinental, Los Angeles, Mexico City–AIFA
SF Airlines	Qingdao
Supernova Airlines	Ostrava

== Accidents and incidents ==
- On February 20, 2021, a Boeing 747-400 freighter airplane, flying Longtail Aviation flight 5504, which was bound for John F. Kennedy International Airport in New York City from the nearby Maastricht Aachen Airport in the Netherlands, had to divert to the airport after take-off after one engine caught fire and debris fell over the town of Meerssen. Two people on the ground were injured.
- On January 20, 2023, heavy snowfall prohibited a Qatar Airways plane carrying nine sloths from embarking from their stopover. Three animals died overnight and the incident led to criticism, for instance from the Walloon Minister for Animal Welfare Céline Tellier.

== Ground transportation ==
=== By car ===
The airport is located next to the E42 (exit 3), close to an important highway junction.

=== By bus ===
An express bus (number 57) links the airport to Liege-Guillemins where connections can be made with local, national and high speed international trains (Eurostar, ICE). Bus number 53 goes to Liege city centre (Place Saint-Lambert) where connections are available with Liege-Saint-Lambert railway station and bus hub, and to Pont-de-Seraing railway station and bus hub. Buses 83 and 85 connect the airport with Liege's city centre (Place Saint-Lambert) where connections are available with Liege-Saint-Lambert railway station and bus hub, and Bierset-Awans railway station.

== See also ==
- Transportation in Belgium
