= Be'er Sheva Airfield =

Be'er Sheva Airfield שדה תימן
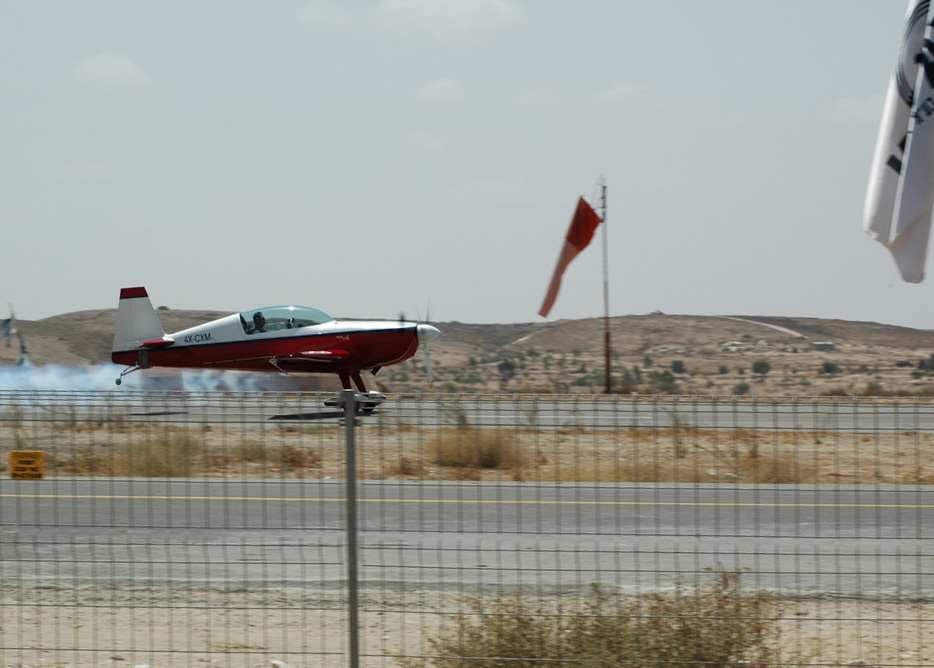
- IATA: BEV; ICAO: LLBS

Summary
- Airport type: Public
- Operator: Ayit Aviation
- Location: Beersheba
- Elevation AMSL: 656 ft (200 m)
- Coordinates: 31°17′13″N 34°43′22″E
- Interactive map of Be'er Sheva Airfield

Runways
Direction	Length		Surface
Direction	ft	m	Surface
14/32	3,384	1,031	Asphalt

Be'er Sheva Airfield (Hebrew: שְׂדֵה תֵּימָן), also known as the Teyman Airfield (IATA: BEV, ICAO: LLBS) is an Israeli airfield located near Beersheba. The airfield is mainly used for flight training, general aviation activity, gliding and skydiving operations. The main operator of the airfield is Ayit Aviation, owned by Captain Eli Peretz, who has managed the airfield for the last 25 years.

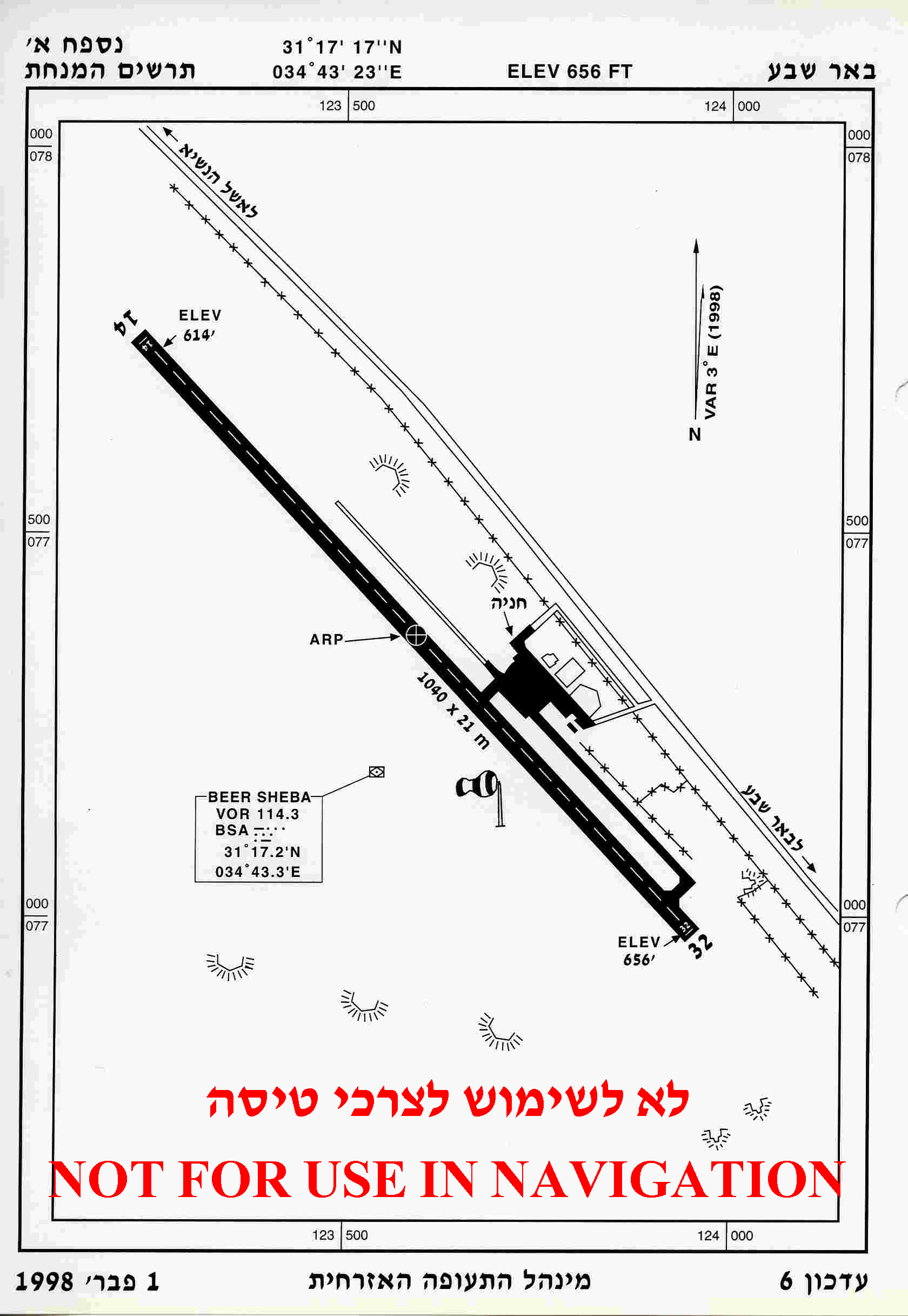
Be'er Sheva (Teyman) Airfield chart

== History ==
=== British Mandate ===
The Sde Teyman strip was built during early WW2, for the use of the RAF to aid in the western desert campaign.

=== Israel ===
During the Suez Crisis the airstrip was converted for the IAF Mustang squadron.

As of 1958, Arkia started to have direct flights between Be'er Sheva and Eilat using DC3 planes. The airfield was not well suited for commercial planes and due to dust and poor construction Arkia stopped the flights in 1960. In 1964, after covering the airstrip with a special chemical coating, Arkia was able to start flying again.

In 1974 Arkia started to use the Islander planes and added the Neve Zohar as a destination.

In 2001, the Israeli transportation agency declared that the airstrip would be upgraded and maintained. The maintenance started in 2003 and the airstrip was transferred to Ayit Aviation and Tourism.

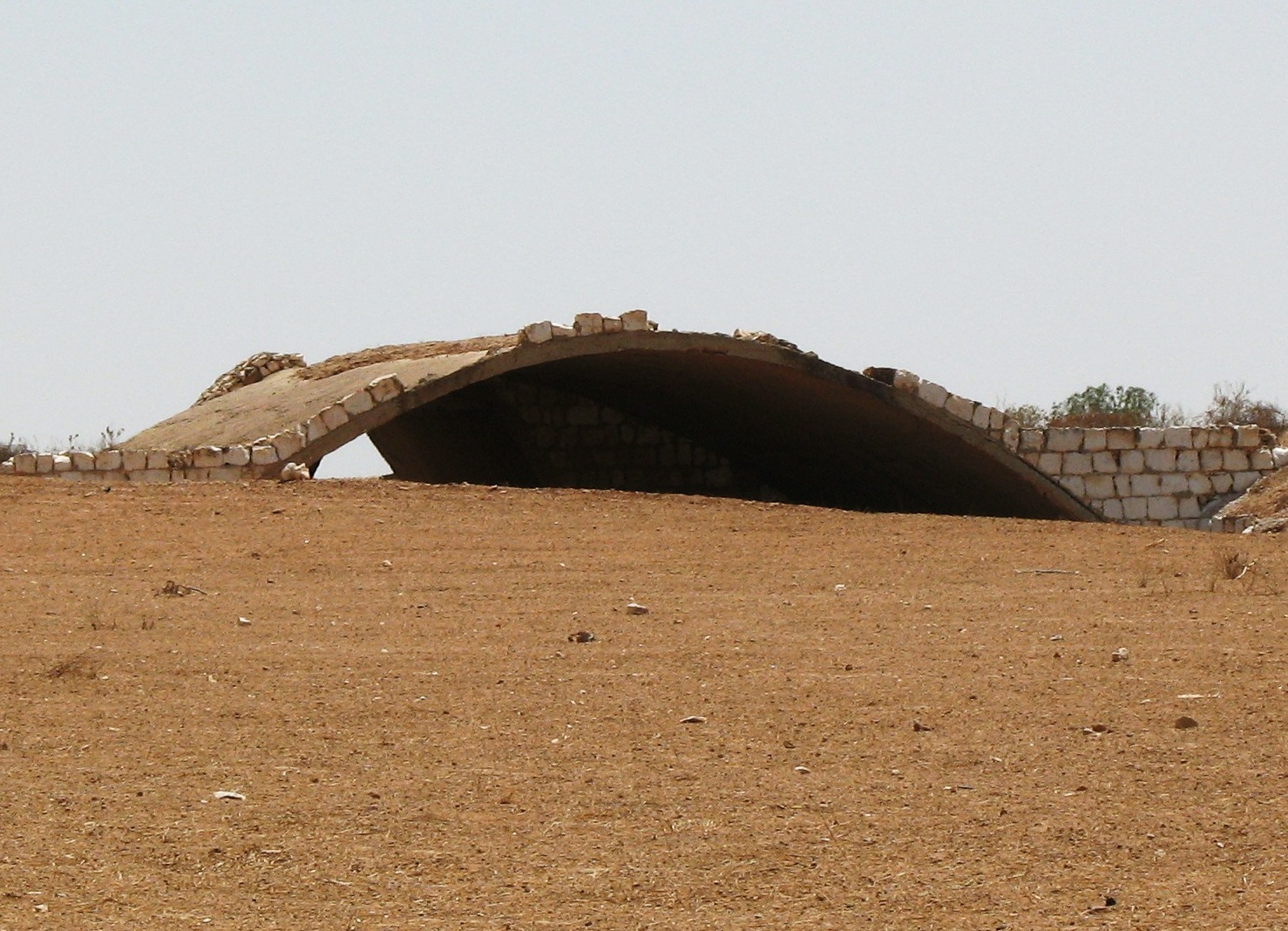
RAF built Hardened aircraft shelter

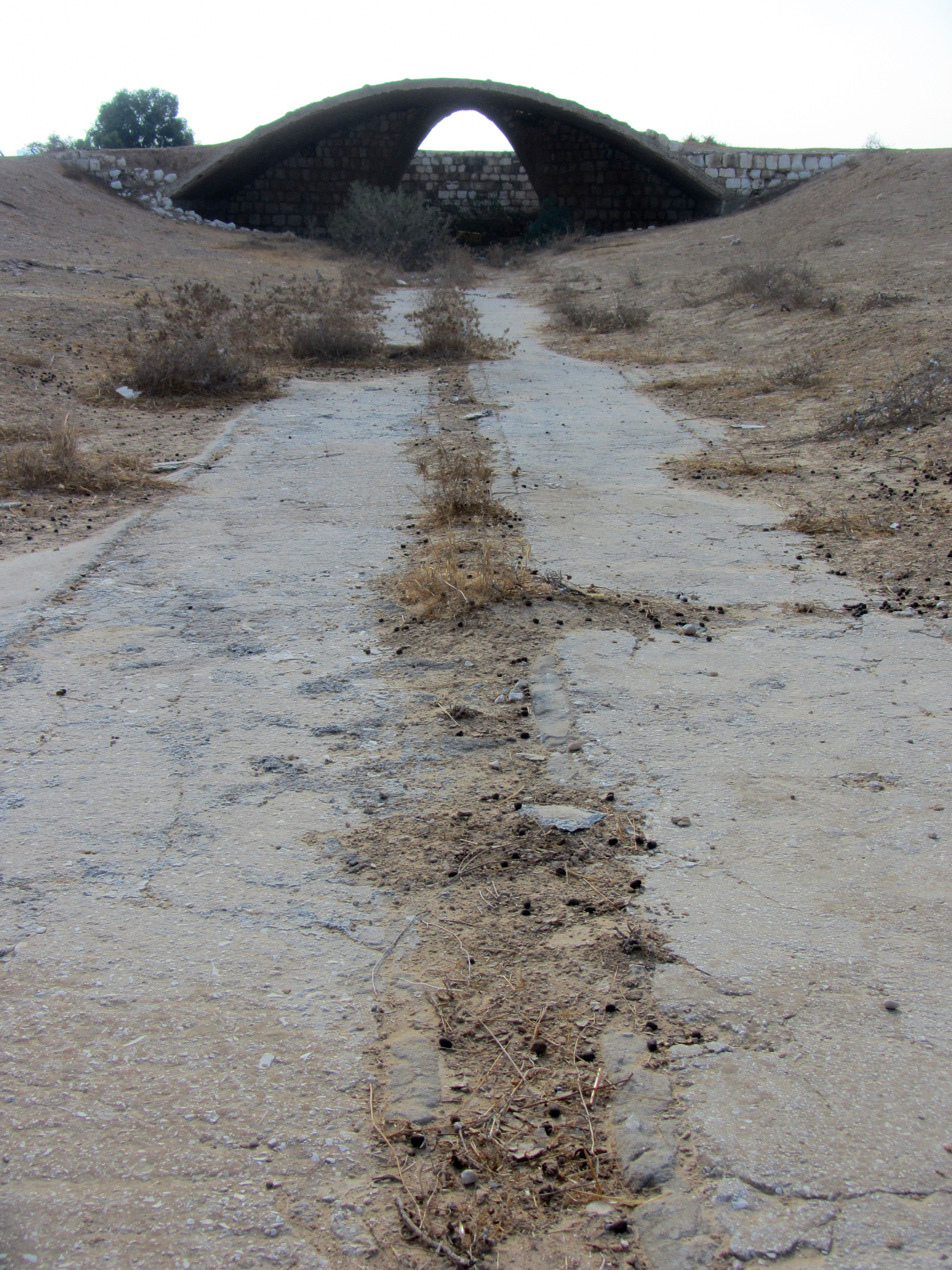
RAF British built hardened aircraft shelter

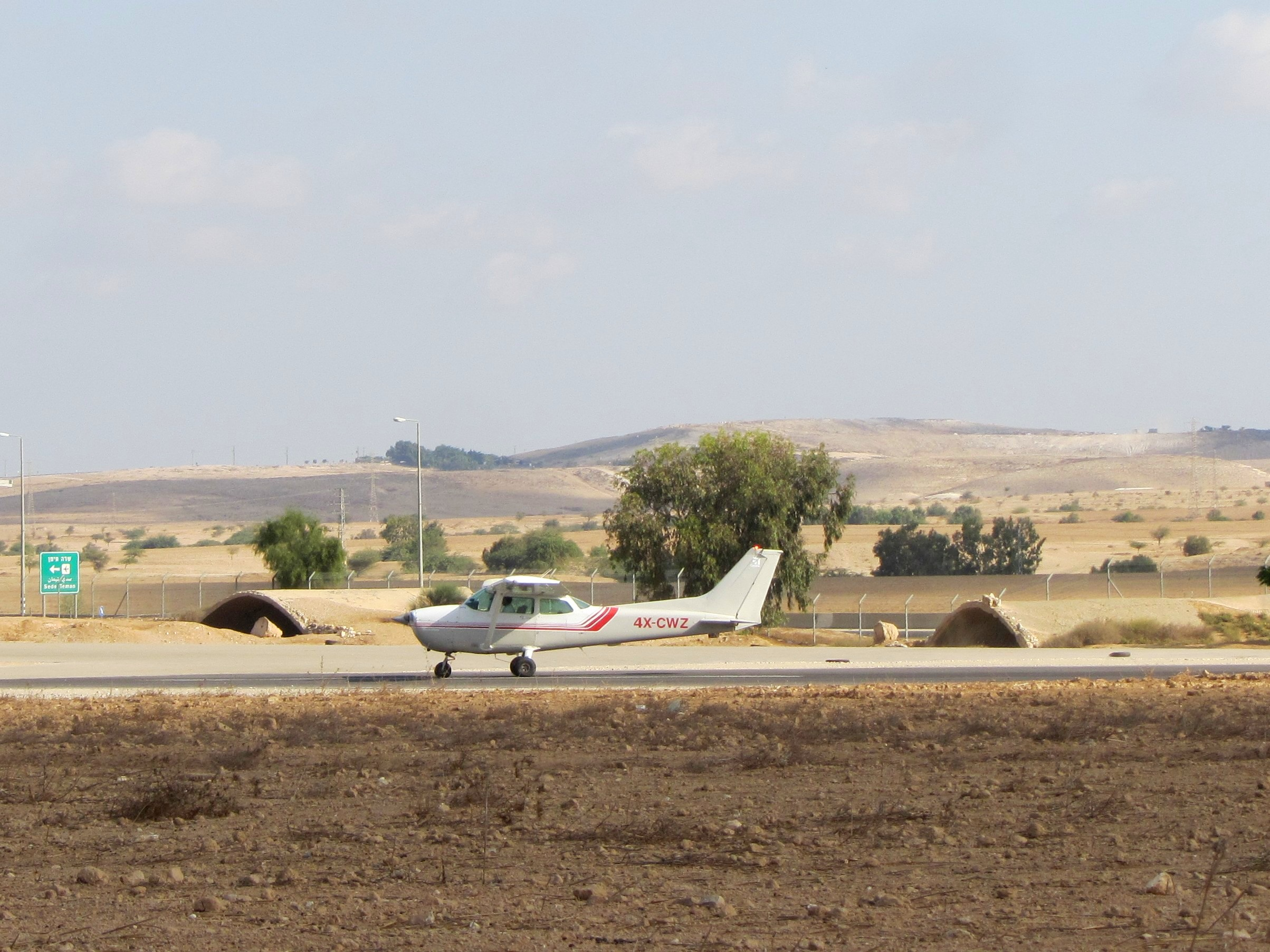
Training plane in Sde Tayman

== See also ==
- Sde Teiman detention camp
