= Rosh Pina Airport =

Israeli Airport

Rosh Pina Airport שדה התעופה ראש פינה مطار روش بينا
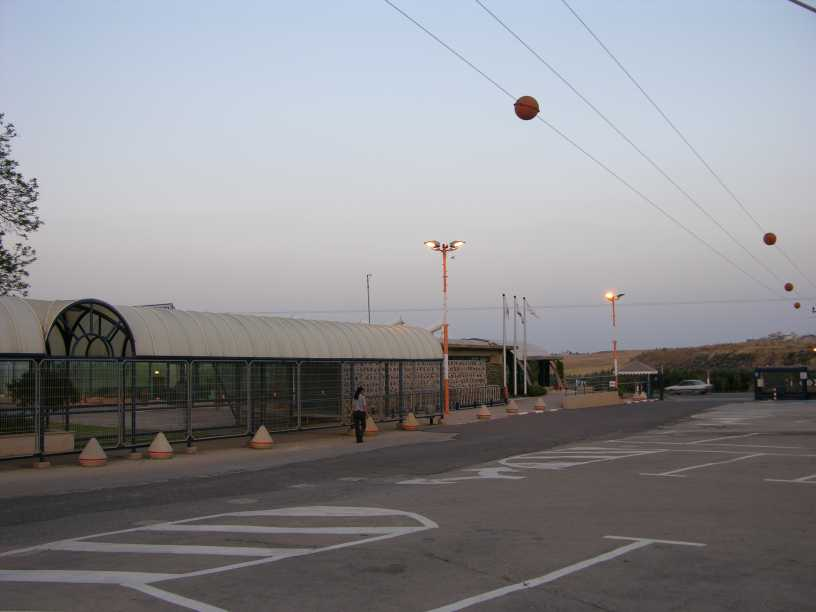
- IATA: RPN; ICAO: LLIB

Summary
- Airport type: Public
- Operator: Israel Airports Authority
- Location: Rosh Pinna, Mahanayim
- Elevation AMSL: 922 ft / 281 m
- Coordinates: 32°58′51.77″N 35°34′18.87″E

Map

Runways
Direction	Length		Surface
Direction	ft	m	Surface
05/23	3,190	972	Asphalt
15/33	3,655	1,114	Asphalt

Rosh Pina Airport (Hebrew: שְׂדֵה הַתְּעוּפָה רֹאשׁ פִּינָּה, Arabic: مطار روش بينا) (IATA: RPN, ICAO: LLIB), officially Isaac Ben Jacob Rosh Pina Airport, sometimes called Mahanayim Airport due to its proximity to Mahanayim, is an Israeli airport located in Rosh Pinna, near the Safed-Hatzor-Rosh Pina Industrial Park. The airport is located 16 km from Safed, 29 km from Tiberias and 30 km from Kiryat Shmona.

== History ==
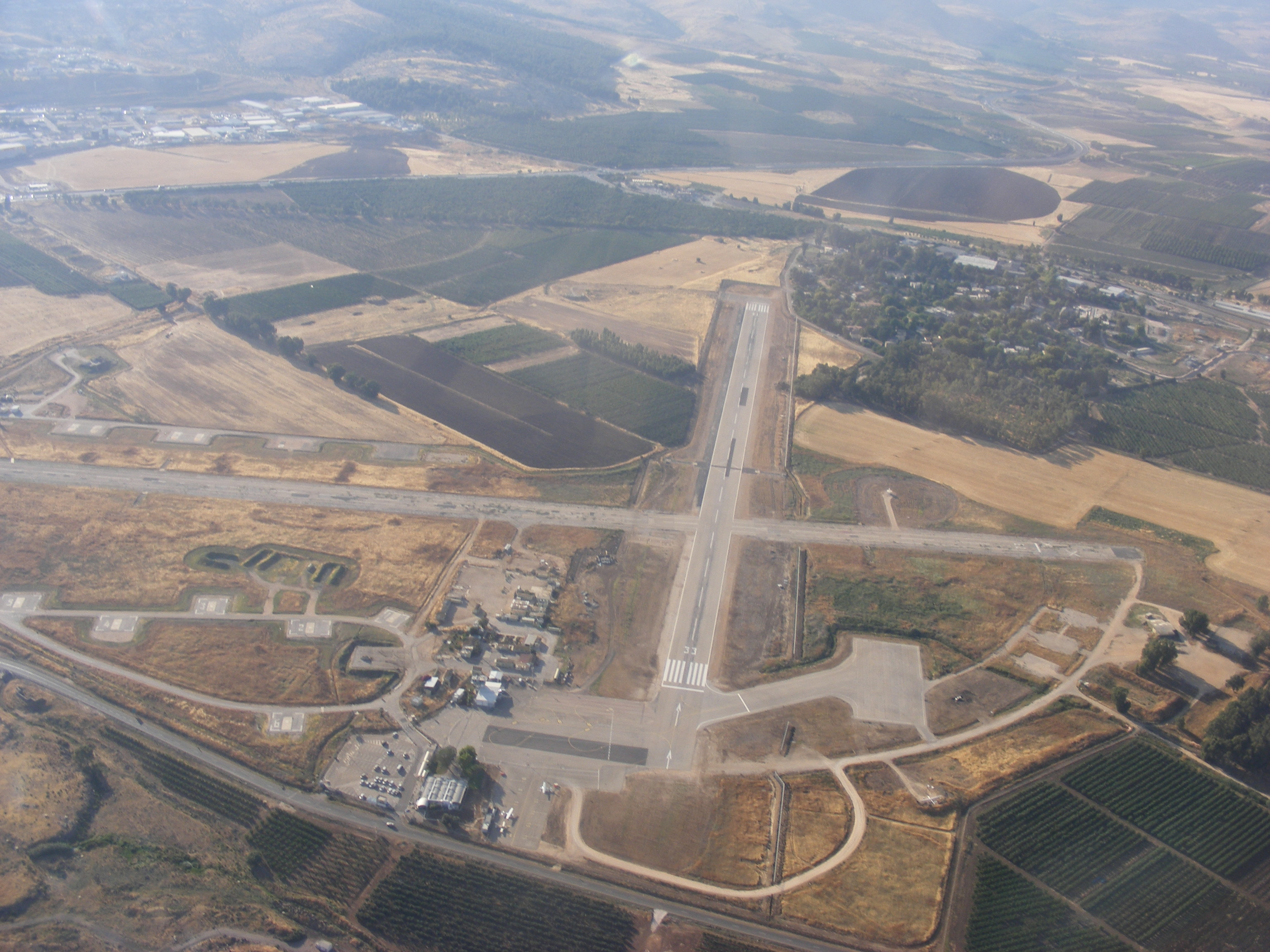
Aerial view

The airport was built in 1943 during the British Mandate for Palestine and became RAF Station Machanaim. Using 400 mules and Indian soldiers, Major Ronald John Jarvis Horton laid the foundations. With his mules and wooden chariots, he then trekked overland to India and Burma where he fought the Japanese at Kohima. Mahanayim served the British army against Vichy France in Syria. After the British evacuation in 1948, the airport was transferred to Israel for use by the IAF. In the 1950s, Arkia Israel Airlines began service to the airport, working from a hut which served as a passenger terminal and air traffic control tower. By 1968, a new terminal building had been constructed and three years later, in 1971, a fire station and control tower were erected. Following increased activity, the passenger terminal was further expanded in 1994. In 2008 the airport was closed temporarily for the testing of an Elbit Systems unmanned aerial vehicle (UAV).

== Airlines and destinations ==
Since the closure of Tel Aviv-Sde Dov, which was the only destination served from Rosh Pina by Ayit Aviation and Tourism there are currently no more scheduled flights at the airport.

== Statistics ==
Since the beginning of the century the airport saw decreasing number of passengers. The drop off in passenger volume has been attributed to major upgrades undertaken on the road infrastructure to the northern periphery of Israel since the early 2000s, leading to a viable alternative to air service to the region. (For example, Egged bus №845, which as of July 2019 travels from Rosh Pina to Tel Aviv in about an hour and 45 minutes.) Most flights from Rosh Pina were to Sde Dov Airport in Tel Aviv. However, Sde Dov closed in mid-2019, making travel by air from Tel Aviv to Rosh Pina even less convenient.

Year	Total Domestic Passengers	Total Domestic Operations
1999	168,915	21,647
2000	123,595	18,137
2001	127,123	19,593
2002	108,016	17,926
2003	80,277	15,706
2004	54,764	14,995
2005	45,306	13,149
2006	16,110	11,592
2007	16,790	11,017
2008	19,766	9,703
2009	19,050	7,614
2010	23,067	10,275
2011	15,782	9,273
2012	15,224	9,491
Source: Israel Airports Authority

== Accidents ==
- On 19 April 1974 two Sikorsky CH-53 Sea Stallion helicopters collided over the airport. One of the helicopters managed to land safely while the other helicopter crashed and caught fire. All 8 IDF soldiers on board died.
- On 4 February 1997 two Sikorsky CH-53 Sea Stallion helicopters took off from the airport on their way towards the Israeli Security Zone in southern Lebanon. The helicopters collided over She'ar Yashuv in northern Israel and crashed, killing all 73 IDF soldiers on board (see 1997 Israeli helicopter disaster).
