= Bowen Zhou =

Chinese computer scientist and AI entrepreneur

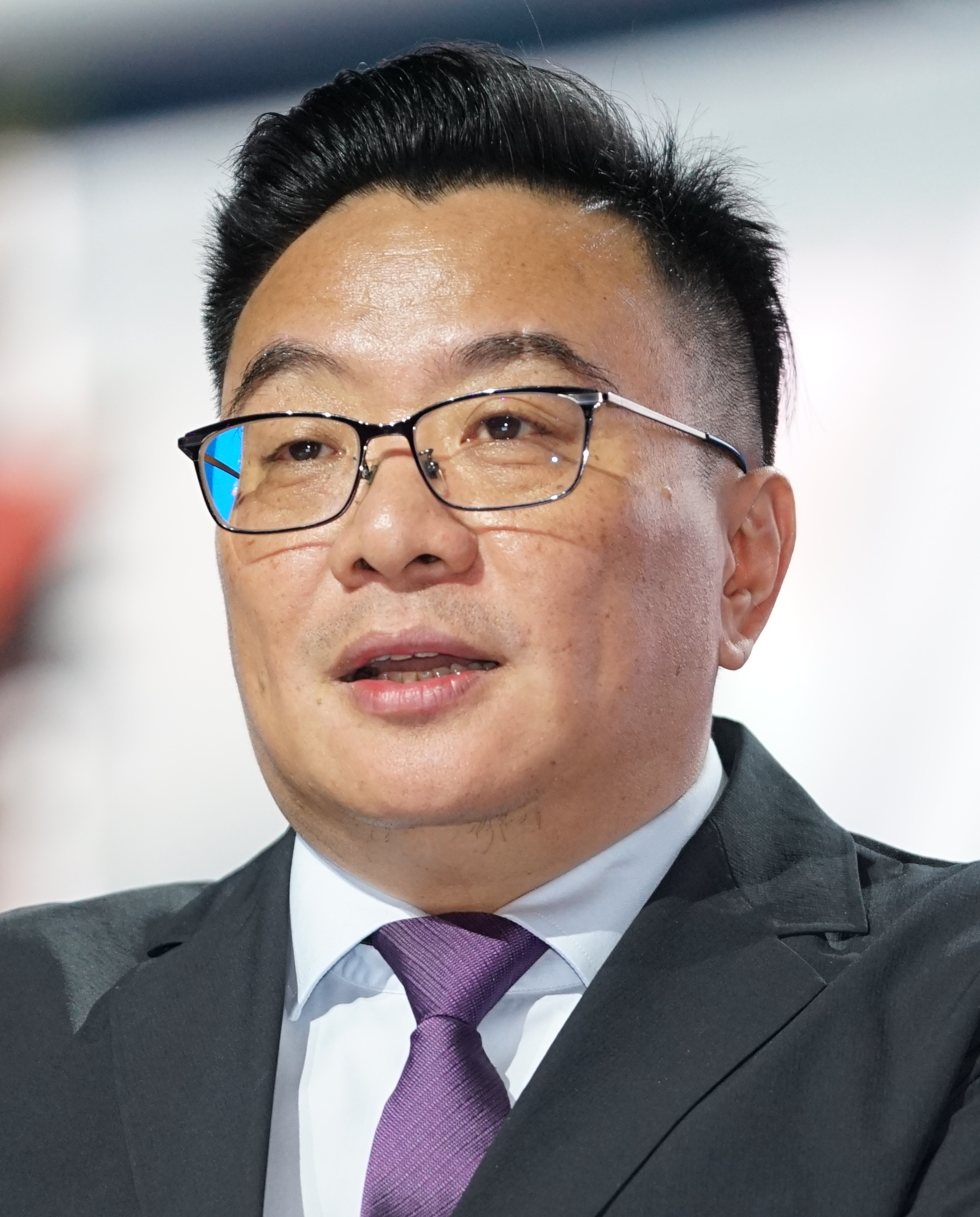
- Zhou at AAAI 2026
- Born: Zhou Bowen (Chinese: 周伯文)
- Education: Univ. of Science and Technology of China (BS); Chinese Academy of Sciences（MS） University of Colorado Boulder (PhD)
- Occupations: Computer scientist, entrepreneur
- Known for: Natural language processing, Large language models, IBM Watson
- Title: Founder of Frontis.ai; Professor at Tsinghua University

Bowen Zhou (Chinese: 周伯文; born October 1976) is a Chinese computer scientist and entrepreneur specializing in artificial intelligence (AI). Currently, he serves as the Director and Chief Scientist of the ShangHai Artificial Intelligence Laboratory, and the founder of the AI startup Frontis.ai (Xianyuan Technology). He is also a Chair Professor in the Department of Electronic Engineering at Tsinghua University. He previously held senior leadership roles at JD.com and IBM Research, including Chief Scientist of IBM Watson.

== Education ==
Zhou received his bachelor's degree from the University of Science and Technology of China . He subsequently moved to the United States, earning a PhD in Electrical and Computer Engineering from the University of Colorado Boulder.

== Career ==
=== IBM and JD.com ===
Zhou spent 15 years at IBM's Thomas J. Watson Research Center in New York. During his tenure, he served as the Chief Scientist of the IBM Watson Group and Director of the AI Foundations Lab, where he was a key technical contributor to the development of IBM Watson.

In 2017, Zhou joined the Chinese e-commerce giant JD.com as Senior Vice President. He served as the President of JD Cloud & AI and Chairman of the JD Technology Committee, overseeing the company's AI research and cloud computing infrastructure.

=== Academia and entrepreneurship ===
In 2022, Zhou returned to academia as a tenured professor at Tsinghua University's Department of Electronic Engineering. He also founded Frontis.ai (Beijing Xianyuan Technology), a startup focused on large-scale model applications and industrial AI solutions.

== Research and Recognition ==
Zhou's research interests include Artificial General Intelligence (AGI ), Large Language Models, DeepLearning, natural language processing(NLP), AI Safety, AI Alignment, and AI for Science. He has Published over 200 papers in conferences such as NeurIPS, ACL , and AAAI.

Zhou was elected a fellow of the IEEE in 2019 for his "leadership in human language technologies." He is also a fellow of the CAAI (Chinese Association for Artificial Intelligence).
