= 2014 Ben Gurion Airport flight bans =

The 2014 Ben Gurion Airport flight bans were a series of flight bans at Ben Gurion Airport in Israel due to the 2014 Gaza War.

== FAA flight bans ==
On 21 July 2014, the United States State Department advised U.S. citizens to "consider the deferral of non-essential travel to Israel" in consideration of the firing of rockets into different parts of Israel (including cities).

On 22 July, a rocket landed about a mile from Tel Aviv's Ben Gurion Airport. Delta Air Lines diverted a flight which was in the air to Paris. Delta Air Lines and United Airlines suspended all flights to Tel Aviv indefinitely, and US Airways also cancelled flights. After this, the Federal Aviation Administration (FAA) prohibited U.S. airlines from flying to or from the airport for up to 24 hours and cited "the potentially hazardous situation created by the armed conflict in Israel and Gaza." The European Aviation Safety Agency (EASA) stated that it "strongly recommends" that airlines do not fly into or out of the Tel Aviv airport. On 23 July, the FAA extended its prohibition for another 24 hours, however halfway through the extension, 36 hours into the flight ban, the FAA lifted their ban.

Former New York City mayor Michael Bloomberg flew to Ben Gurion on El Al on the 23rd of July in order to prove that Israel's airports are safe and to show his solidarity with Israel. He told CNN, "The fact that one rocket falls far away from this airport – a mile away – doesn't mean you should shut down air traffic into a country and paralyze the country."

== Israel's reaction ==
Shortly after the FAA announcement, Yisrael Katz, the Israeli Transportation Minister, stated that "Ben Gurion airport was safe for take-offs and landings, and that there was no security concern for passenger planes." Israel previously stated that the Iron Dome has successfully intercepted "about 90% of rockets headed toward populated or strategic areas". Israel's Civil Aviation Authority wrote a document which said that Israel is taking efforts to avoid commercial airline cancellations of flights going into Ben-Gurion Airport. It submitted the document to Transportation Minister Katz, indicating that the airport was safe for landings and departures. One significant measure taken by the aviation authorities to increase the level of safety at Ben Gurion during the Gaza operation was to route all commercial traffic through the airspace north of the airport and away from the direction of Gaza. This move was facilitated by frequently employing runway 03/21, a new runway at the airport that was completed less than two months before the conflict began.

In response to the cancellations, on 23 July, Israel offered to open up Ovda Airport (in southern Israel, 60 km (37 mi) north of Eilat) to international flights, due to its distance from Gaza. There was crowding and chaos at the airport after it opened; 5,000 people were expected to pass through the airport on 24 July. Among the airlines flying to the airport were Air Europa, Air Méditerranée, and Neos. The Iron Dome intercepted a rocket over Eilat (which is farther south than the Ovda airport) on 24 July.

== Airlines responses ==
Some airlines which cancelled flights include Aegean Airlines, Aeroflot, Air Baltic, Air Berlin, Air Canada, Air France, Air Serbia, Air Sinai, Alitalia, American Airlines, Austrian Airlines, Brussels Airlines, Croatia Airlines, Cyprus Airways, Delta Air Lines, easyJet, Finnair, Germanwings, Iberia, KLM, Korean Air, LOT Polish Airlines, Lufthansa, Meridiana, NIKI, Norwegian Air Shuttle, Pegasus Airlines, Royal Jordanian, Scandinavian Airlines, Swiss International Air Lines, Tailwind Airlines, TAROM, TUIfly, Transaero, Turkish Airlines, United Airlines, US Airways, Wizzair, and Vueling.

Other airlines, such as Korean Air and Norwegian Air Shuttle, had already cancelled flights before the rocket strike.

El Al followed these cancellations by stating that there is "no chance" that they will cancel any flights. Arkia, Azerbaijan Airlines, Belavia, Bluebird Airways, British Airways, Bulgaria Air, Czech Airlines, Ethiopian Airlines, Israir, Rossiya Airlines, Thai Airways, Siberia Airlines, Yakutia Airlines and Ukraine International Airlines also continued flying.

El Al announced that four planes would be sent to Istanbul to retrieve those who were stranded there because of flight cancellations.

Over the 23rd and 24 July period, both the FAA and the EASA lifted the ban on the flights to Israel, while some carriers, such as Air France, chose not to renew their coverage yet. Aeroflot and TAROM resumed flights on 23 July, Air Berlin, Air Canada, Air Méditerranée, Alitalia, American Airlines, Delta Air Lines, easyJet, FedEx Express, Iberia, LOT Polish Airlines, Scandinavian Airlines, Transaero, UPS Airlines, and US Airways renewed usual service on 24 July, Air France, Finnair, Turkish Airlines, United Airlines, Vueling Airlines, and Wizz Air renewed regular service on 25 July, Air Berlin, Austrian Airlines, Brussels Airlines, Germanwings, Lufthansa, Norwegian Air Shuttle, and Swiss International Air Lines resumed flights on 26 July, and Air Sinai and Egyptair resumed flights on 3 August.

== Later threats ==
On 20 August, Hamas threatened to fire additional rockets at Ben Gurion on 21 August at 06:00. Their warning stated that all airlines should cancel their flights. In response to the warnings, Royal Jordanian canceled their flights to Ben Gurion.
