= Shmuel Zakai =

Israeli brigadier-general (born 1963)

- שמואל זכאי
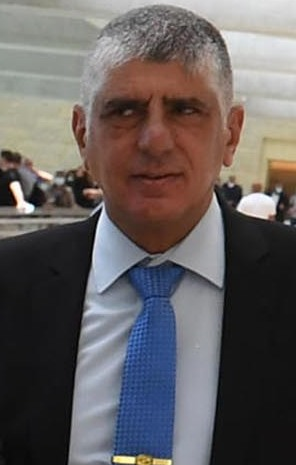
- Shmuel Zakai, 2021
- Born: 1963 (age 62–63); Afula, Israel
- Alma mater: Tel Aviv University
- Military career
- Allegiance: Israel
- Branch: Israel Defense Forces
- Service years: 1981 – 2004
- Rank: Brigadier General
- Commands: 51st Battalion; Geffen Battalion; Carmeli Brigade; Elyakim Military Base; Hiram Formation; Golani Brigade; 80th Division; Gaza Division
- Conflicts: 1982 Lebanon War; South Lebanon Conflict; First Intifada; Second Intifada
- Other work: Ben Gurion Airport; Civil Aviation Authority of Israel

Shmuel Zakai (Hebrew: שמואל זכאי; born 1963) is an Israeli brigadier general who was forcibly discharged from the Israel Defense Forces (IDF) in November 2004 by order of chief of staff Moshe Yaalon.

Zakai resigned as commander of the IDF's Gaza Division, a position he had held since March 2004, after failing a polygraph test during an investigation into leaks to the Israeli media during the Days of Penitence operation in the northern Gaza Strip in October 2004. Zakai was accused of leaking reports to the media that the IDF wanted to end the operation before the political echelon did.

After resigning as head of the Gaza Division, Zakai was removed from the IDF altogether after 24 years of service, with Yaalon saying that his actions had constituted "an abandonment of a division during combat." He was replaced by Aviv Kochavi, a former commander of the Paratroopers Brigade.

Zakai's previous positions include:

- 2002–2004: Commander, Edom Division
- 1999–2001: Commander, Golani infantry brigade
- 1998–1999: Commander, Hiram Formation (Northern Command)
- 1995–1996: Battalion commander, IDF Officer's School
- 1993–1994: Deputy commander, Hiram Formation
- 1981–1994: Served in various positions in the Golani Brigade, up to battalion commander.

Zakai was reportedly close to Defense Minister and former chief of staff Shaul Mofaz, who promoted him to brigadier general before he attained a division command.

Zakai is a graduate of the IDF Staff College and has a degree in humanities from Tel Aviv University.
