= Ben Gurion Airport =

Main international airport of Israel

Ben Gurion International Airport נמל התעופה בן גוריון
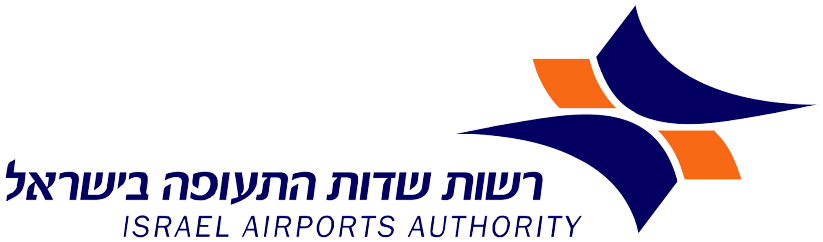

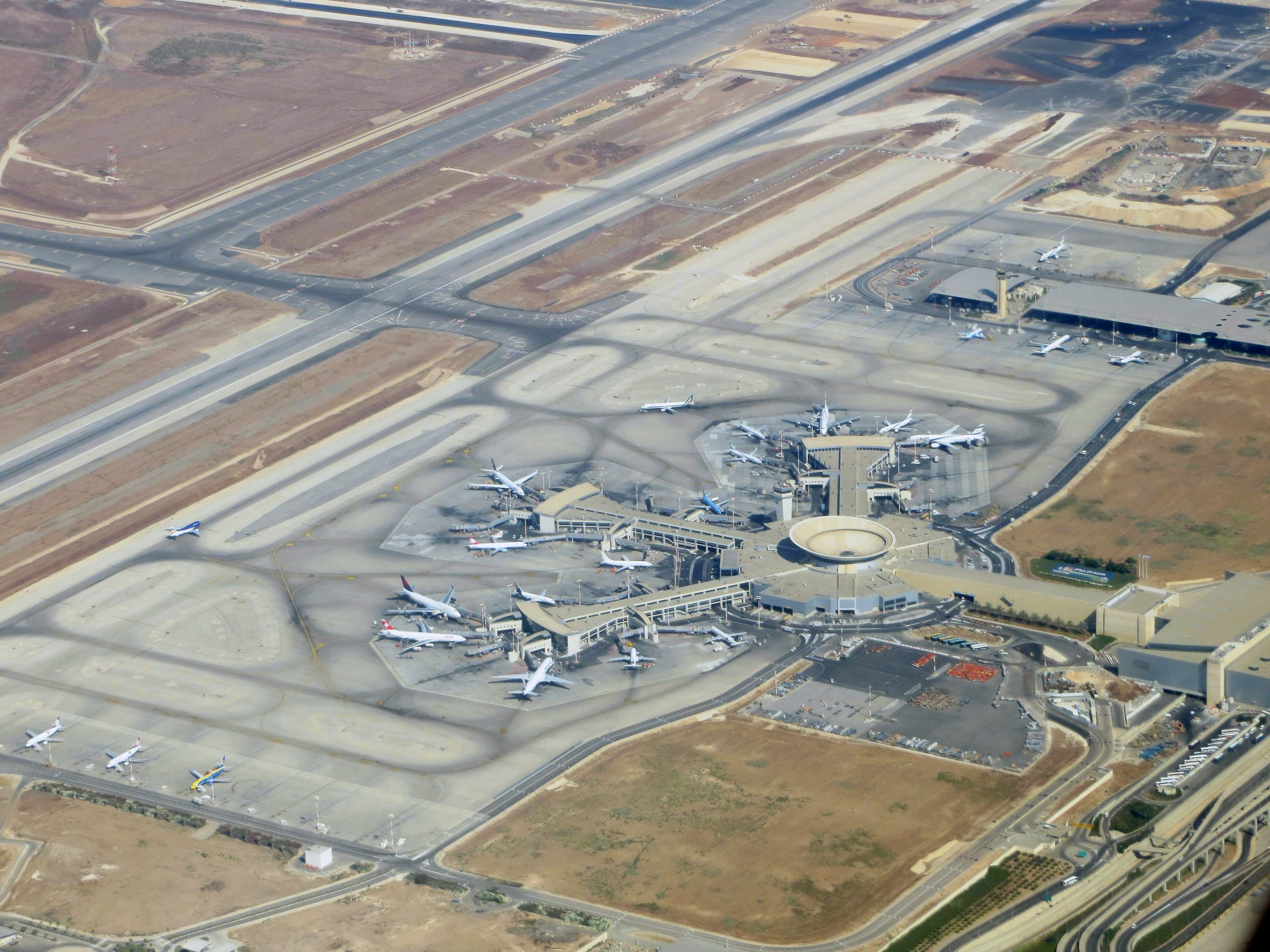
- IATA: TLV; ICAO: LLBG

Summary
- Airport type: Public
- Owner: Ministry of Transport and Road Safety
- Operator: Israel Airports Authority
- Serves: Gush Dan and Greater Jerusalem
- Location: Central District, Israel
- Hub for: Arkia; CAL Cargo Airlines; El Al; Israir; Sundor
- Elevation AMSL: 135 ft (41 m)
- Coordinates: 32°00′34″N 034°52′58″E
- Website: iaa.gov.il

Map
- Location within Israel Location within the Middle East

Runways
Direction	Length		Surface
Direction	m	ft	Surface
03/21	2,772	9,094	Asphalt Concrete
08/26	4,062	13,327	Asphalt Concrete
12/30	3,112	10,210	Asphalt Concrete

Statistics (2025)
- Total passengers: 19,160,160 ▲32%
- International passengers: 18,470,531 ▲33%
- Domestic passengers: 689,629 ▲6%
- Aircraft movements: 140,736 ▲30%
- Source: Civil Aviation Authority of Israel

Ben Gurion International Airport (Hebrew: נמל התעופה בן-גוריון, romanized: Nēmāl ha-tē‘ufā Bēn-Guriyôn; Arabic: مطار بن غوريون الدولي, romanized: Maṭār Bin Ġūriyūn ad-duwalī) (IATA: TLV, ICAO: LLBG), commonly known by the Hebrew-language acronym Natbag (נתב״ג), is the main international airport of Israel and the busiest in the country. It lies on the northern outskirts of Lod, 45 kilometres (28 mi) northwest of Jerusalem and 20 kilometres (12 mi) southeast of Tel Aviv. Known as Lod Airport until 1973, it was renamed that year in honour of David Ben-Gurion, Israel's first prime minister, following his death. The airport is operated by the Israel Airports Authority and serves as a hub for El Al, Israir, Arkia and Sundor.

The airport was built in 1934 during the British Mandate and served as a Royal Air Force station during the Second World War. Israeli forces captured it in July 1948, during Operation Danny, and it became the country's principal point of arrival for Jewish immigrants, from the airlifts of the early 1950s to Operation Solomon in 1991. In 1972 it was the scene of the hijacking of Sabena Flight 571 and the Lod Airport massacre, in which 26 people were killed; four years later, hostages rescued in Operation Entebbe were flown back to the airport, and in 1977 the Egyptian president Anwar Sadat landed there at the start of the first visit to Israel by an Arab head of state. Terminal 3, designed by Skidmore, Owings & Merrill, opened in 2004 and replaced the original Terminal 1, which now handles domestic and low-cost international flights.

Operations at the airport have repeatedly been disrupted by regional conflict. Several foreign airlines suspended flights during the 2014 Israel–Gaza conflict and the Gaza war; in May 2025 a Houthi ballistic missile struck inside the airport's perimeter, and the following month it was closed for eleven days during the Twelve-Day War with Iran. The airport was also brought to a near standstill by the COVID-19 pandemic, closing to passenger traffic entirely for several weeks in early 2021.

In 2025 the airport handled 19.2 million passengers, making it one of the busiest airports in the Middle East, and it is regarded as central to Israel's economy, tourism and trade. By the mid-2020s it was operating close to its capacity limits, and the Israel Airports Authority has pursued a long-term expansion programme that has included a runway reconfiguration completed in 2014, a new control tower in 2015, a fourth concourse at Terminal 3 and a planned on-site hotel; Ramon Airport, opened in 2019, was designed partly as an emergency alternative. The airport's security screening relies heavily on passenger profiling, which supporters credit with preventing attacks on departing flights and which Israeli civil-rights organisations have challenged in the Supreme Court as discriminatory towards Arab passengers. A 2007 government review found serious shortcomings in Israeli aviation safety, and the U.S. Federal Aviation Administration downgraded Israel's safety rating in 2008 before restoring it in 2012.

== History ==
=== British Mandatory period (1934–1948) ===
The terminal at Lod Airport in 1958

The airport began during the British Mandate for Palestine as an airstrip of two unpaved runways on the outskirts of the town of Lydda (now Lod), near the Templer colony of Wilhelma. It was built in 1934, largely at the urging of Airwork Services. The first passenger service at the new airport was the Misr Airwork route Cairo—Lydda—Nicosia, inaugurated on 3 August 1935. Subsequently, Misr flew via Lydda to Haifa and Baghdad. The first continental European airline with a regular service to Lydda was LOT Polish Airlines since 4 April 1937. Holland's KLM, which had since 1933 stopped at Gaza en route to Batavia, Dutch East Indies (now Jakarta, Indonesia), moved the service to Lydda in 1937. Imperial Airways, too, used Lydda as a refueling stop en route to India.

During World War II, Imperial Airways and later British Overseas Airways Corporation continued the service to Lydda until the fall of France in June 1940. When the Japanese military advanced into Burma and Malaya in February 1942, KLM curtailed its route to Batavia and made Lydda the eastern terminus of the route. Misr Airwork, which had suspended flights upon the British declaration of war, resumed the weekly Cairo—Lydda—Nicosia service in May 1940.

In 1943, the airport was renamed "RAF Station Lydda" and continued to serve as a major airfield for military air transport and aircraft ferry operations between military bases in Europe, Africa, the Middle East (mainly Iraq and Persia) and South/Southeast Asia. In 1944, as the German threat in the Middle East subsided, Aviron Aviation Company initiated service four times a week between Lydda and Haifa.

On 25 February 1946, Irgun and Lehi fighters carried out a coordinated night raid on RAF Station Lydda and two other Royal Air Force airfields in Palestine, destroying 22 Handley Page Halifax bombers, seven Supermarine Spitfires and four Avro Ansons across the three bases.

=== Israel ===
==== 20th century ====
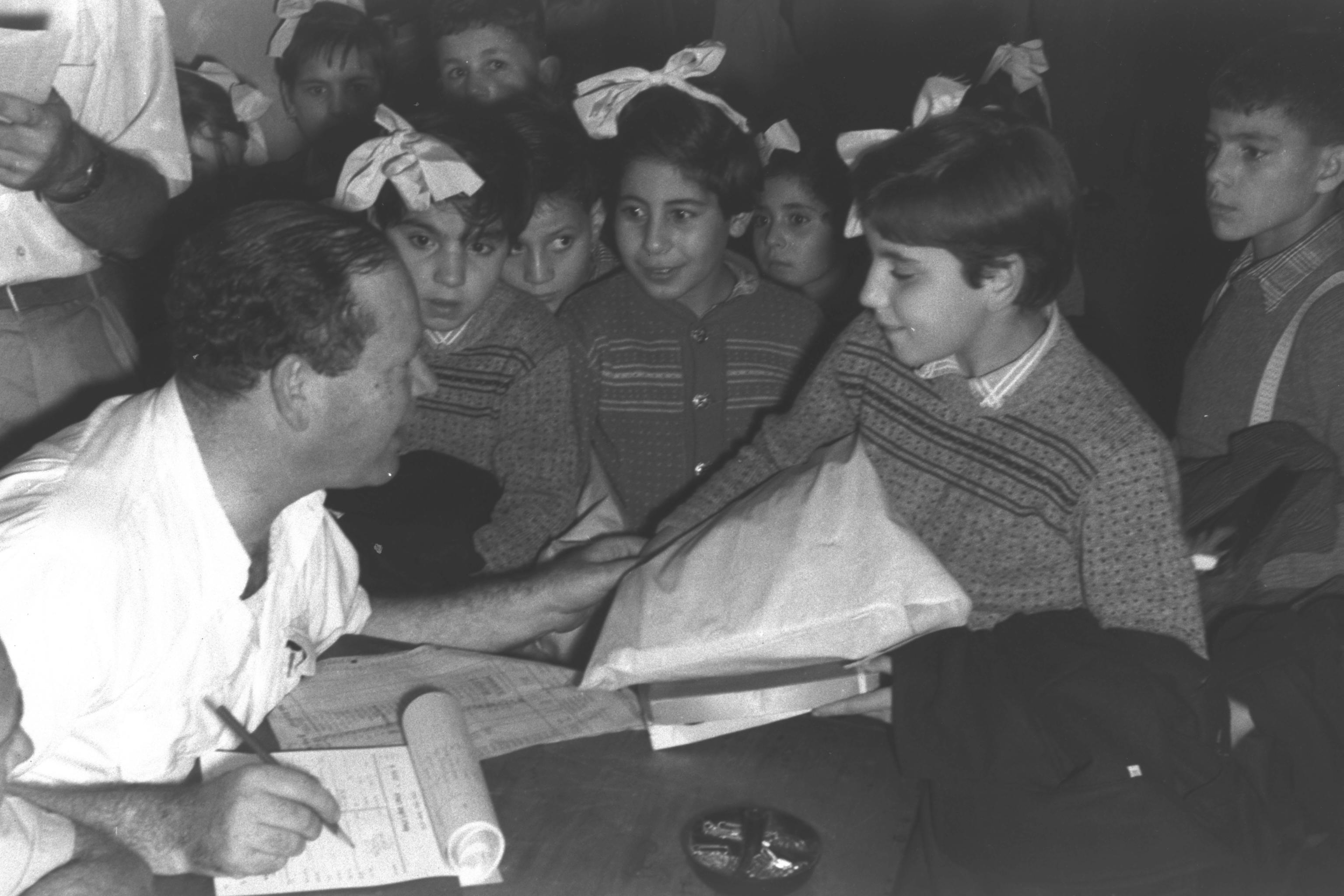
Jewish immigrant children from Morocco arriving at Lod Airport in 1949

Soldiers of the Israel Defense Forces captured the airport on 10 July 1948, in Operation Danny, transferring control to the newly declared State of Israel. In 1948 the Israelis changed the official name of the airport from "Lod International Airport" to "Tel Aviv-Lod International Airport". Flights resumed on 24 November 1948. El Al was founded the following year and flew its inaugural service from the airport to Paris via Rome, while Arkia began domestic flights to Eilat and Haifa in 1950. A terminal expansion completed in 1951 raised the airport's capacity to 100,000 passengers a month, as it handled the mass immigration of the period, including airlifts of Jewish communities from Yemen and Iraq.

In the 1960s the airport received its first scheduled jet services, from London and Athens, and El Al launched its first jet route to New York using a leased Boeing 707. Air traffic grew considerably after the Six-Day War in 1967, as many foreign airlines began operating scheduled flights to the airport.

===== 1972 attacks =====
On 8 May 1972, four Black September militants hijacked Sabena Flight 571 en route from Vienna and forced it to land at the airport, demanding the release of Palestinian prisoners held in Israel. After a standoff of some 23 hours, Sayeret Matkal commandos disguised as aircraft technicians stormed the parked airliner in an operation codenamed Isotope, killing the two male hijackers and capturing their two female accomplices; one passenger was fatally wounded and later died. The assault was led by Ehud Barak; Benjamin Netanyahu, who took part as a team leader, was wounded by friendly fire. Both later served as prime minister of Israel.

Later that month, on 30 May 1972, three members of the Japanese Red Army acting on behalf of the Popular Front for the Liberation of Palestine arrived at the airport on an Air France flight using forged passports. After clearing immigration they collected their luggage from the baggage carousel, took out automatic rifles and grenades and opened fire in the arrivals hall, killing 26 people and wounding 78 in what became known as the Lod Airport massacre. Seventeen of the dead were Christian pilgrims from Puerto Rico and one was Canadian; of the eight Israelis killed, the best known was the biophysicist Aharon Katzir, then president of the Israel Academy of Sciences and Humanities. Two of the attackers, Tsuyoshi Okudaira and Yasuyuki Yasuda, died during the attack.

The only attacker who survived, Kozo Okamoto, was wounded and captured. He received a life sentence but was released in 1985 as part of a prisoner exchange with the PFLP-GC, in what became known as the Jibril Agreement.

===== 1973–1980 =====
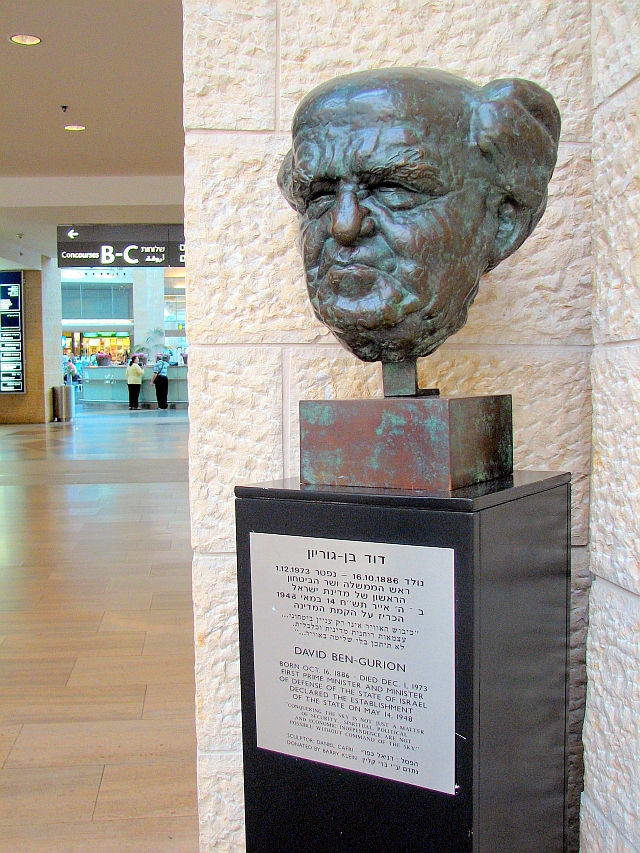
Bust of David Ben-Gurion at the airport, which was renamed in his honour in 1973

The airport's name was changed from Lod to Ben Gurion International Airport in 1973 to honour Israel's first Prime Minister, David Ben-Gurion, who died that year.

During the Yom Kippur War, the airport was the main Israeli terminus for Operation Nickel Grass, a large-scale United States airlift of military equipment that began in October 1973. The first C-5 Galaxy transport touched down on 14 October, and by the time the airlift wound down a month later, American aircraft had flown 567 missions to Israel, delivering more than 22,000 tons of tanks, artillery, combat aircraft and other matériel.

On 27 June 1976, Air France Flight 139, which had departed the airport for Paris, was hijacked and diverted to Entebbe in Uganda. After Israeli commandos freed the hostages in Operation Entebbe on 4 July, the rescued passengers were flown back to the airport, where Prime Minister Yitzhak Rabin and Defence Minister Shimon Peres met them and the soldiers on the tarmac.

On the evening of 19 November 1977, Egyptian President Anwar Sadat landed at the airport at the start of the first visit to Israel by an Arab head of state. He was received with a formal ceremony, including a 21-gun salute, and was greeted by Prime Minister Menachem Begin, President Ephraim Katzir and former prime minister Golda Meir. In 1980, following the Egypt–Israel peace treaty, a flight from Cairo landed at the airport for the first time in almost forty years.

===== 1980s–1990s =====
More buildings and runways were added over the years, but with the onset of mass immigration from Ethiopia and the former Soviet Union in the 1980s and 90s, as well as the global increase of international business travel, the existing facilities became inadequate, prompting the design of a new terminal that could also accommodate the expected tourism influx for the 2000 millennium celebrations. The decision to go ahead with the project was reached in January 1994.

===== Gateway for immigration =====
Beyond its commercial role, the airport has been the principal point of arrival for Jewish immigration to Israel. In its first years it received the airlifts that brought Jewish communities from Yemen and Iraq, traffic that contributed to the terminal expansion completed in 1951. The best known of the later operations was Operation Solomon, in which more than 14,300 Ethiopian Jews were flown from Addis Ababa to the airport over some 36 hours on 24 and 25 May 1991, mostly aboard Boeing 747s; one aircraft is reported to have carried about 1,000 passengers, a record for a single flight.

==== 21st century ====
During the 2014 conflict with Gaza, several airlines banned their flights to the airport for a couple of days.

Ramon Airport, near Eilat, opened in January 2019, partly to serve as an emergency alternative able to accommodate Israel's entire passenger fleet if Ben Gurion cannot operate during a conflict.

The COVID-19 pandemic brought the airport's operations to a near-standstill. El Al suspended nearly all scheduled passenger flights on 27 March 2020, and Terminal 1 closed entirely for lack of traffic, leaving Terminal 3 operating at a fraction of its normal capacity. The airport was closed to passenger traffic entirely between 26 January and 6 March 2021, during Israel's third nationwide lockdown. Annual passenger numbers fell by 80.6 percent in 2020 compared with the previous year, and recovered only partially thereafter: the 21.9 million passengers handled in 2023 remained below the 24.8 million recorded in 2019.

In October 2023, with the outbreak of the Gaza war, the number of airlines that flew into the airport dropped to just 7. By February 2024, only 45 airlines flew into the airport.

On 4 May 2025, the Houthis launched a ballistic missile which landed within the perimeter of the airport, injuring six people. Magen David Adom said that two others were treated for acute anxiety. A month later, the airport was shut down for eleven days (13–24 June) as Israel closed its skies for civil aviation due to the Twelve-Day War.

On 18 March 2026, during the 2026 Iran War, a missile strike damaged three empty private planes parked at the airport, leading Israeli authorities to reduce to 130 the maximum number of passengers permitted on outbound flights.

As of May 2026, dozens of United States Air Force aerial refuelling aircraft, primarily KC-135 Stratotankers and KC-46 Pegasus tankers, were deployed at Ben Gurion Airport, having arrived from early 2026 amid heightened regional military activity involving the United States and Israel linked to tensions with Iran. Satellite imagery analysed by the Financial Times indicated that their number rose from about 36 in March to around 50–52 by May 2026. The deployment was reported to have placed additional strain on civilian operations at the airport because of congestion and limited infrastructure capacity, with the aircraft expected to remain until the end of 2027.

In June 2026, Etihad Airways increased its Ben Gurion service to six daily flights to Zayed International Airport in Abu Dhabi, making it the airline's most frequently flown route. The AUH-TLV route had 100,000 passengers in the first quarter of 2026, with more than two-thirds using Abu Dhabi as a hub to travel to Etihad destinations elsewhere in Asia.

On 20 August 2026, the busiest travel day of the year, a wildcat strike by airport workers protesting staff shortages halted check-in and arrivals for more than an hour, disrupting some 107,000 passengers and more than 600 scheduled flights and leaving delays and crowding for hours afterwards. The Histadrut denied having called the strike. Prime Minister Benjamin Netanyahu said the airport would "continue to be open and operate as usual", and the Ministry of Finance estimated the damage at NIS 25–30 million (about $8–10 million).

== Operation and management ==
The airport is operated by the Israel Airports Authority, a government-owned body established under a 1977 Knesset law that made it responsible for operating, managing and developing Israel's airports and land border crossings. The authority's head office is located at the airport.

== Passenger terminals ==
=== Terminal 1 ===
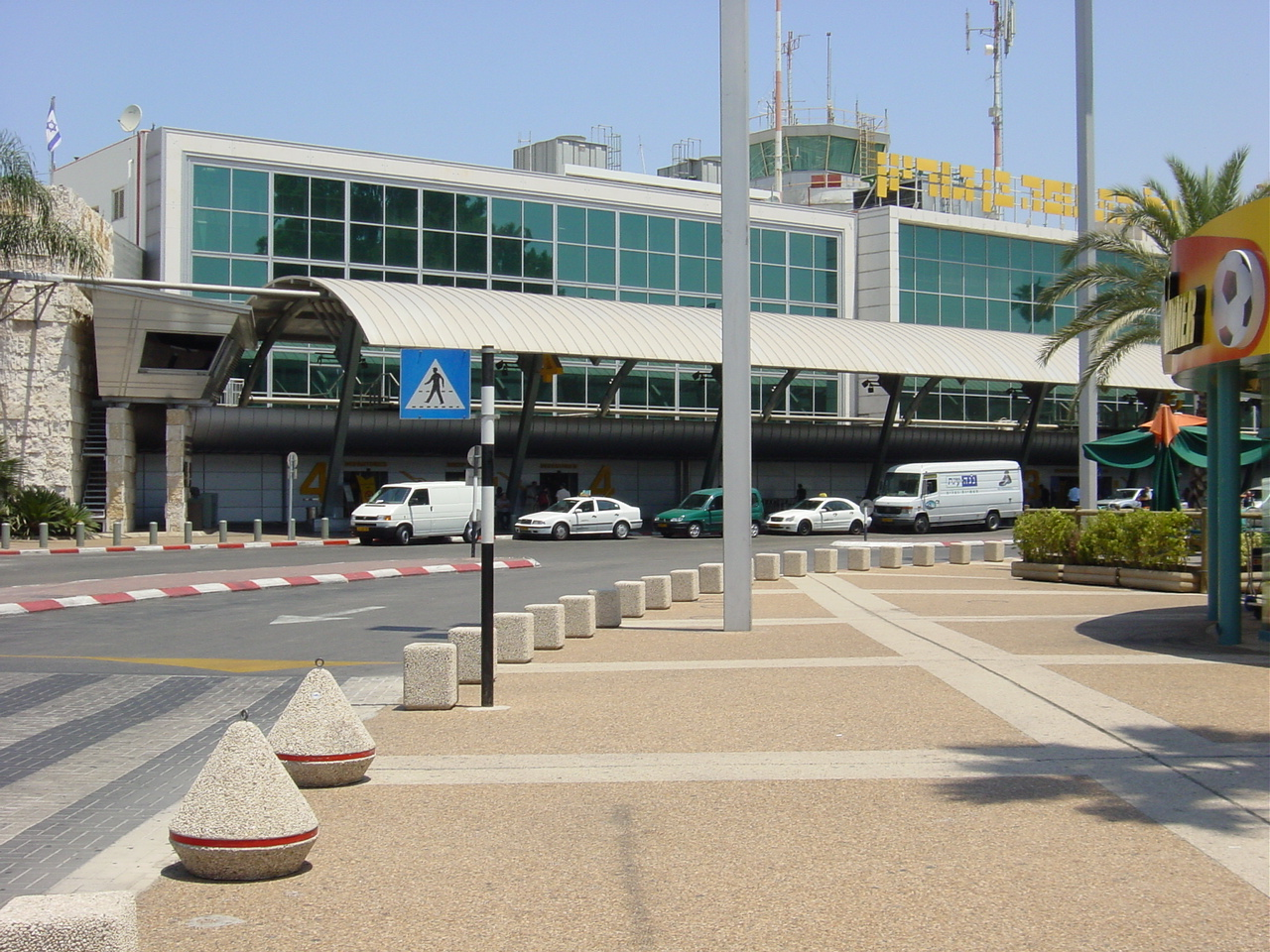
Terminal 1, which handles domestic and some low-cost international flights

==== History ====
Before the opening of Terminal 3, Terminal 1 was the airport's main terminal; passengers were taken by apron bus to aircraft parked on the tarmac. It closed in 2003 and reopened after renovation in 2007 to handle domestic flights.

The renovations for the terminal were designed by Yosef Assa with three individual atmospheric themes. Firstly, the public halls have a Land-of-Israel character with walls painted in the colors of Israel's Judean, Jerusalem and Galilee mountains. The departure hall is given an atmosphere of vacation and leisure, whilst the arrivals hall is given a more urban theme as passengers return to the city.

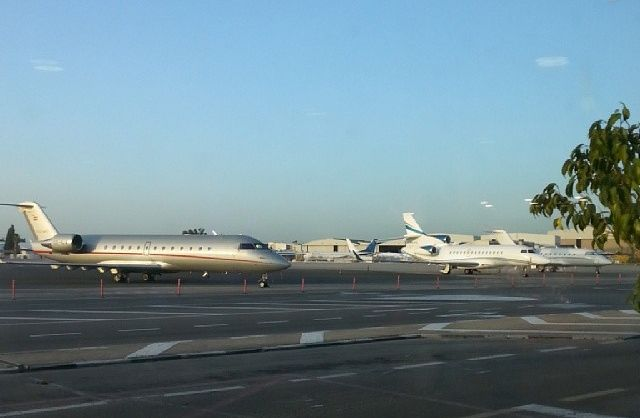
Private jets on the apron at Terminal 1

In February 2006, the Israel Airports Authority announced a NIS 4.3 million plan for a VIP wing in Terminal 1 for private-jet passengers and crews, with its own security, passport control and customs facilities.

In May 2019, the Fattal hotel group opened Israel's first private airport terminal, located in the Masada hall next to Terminal 1's main entrance. The facility runs under a ten-year agreement with the Ministry of Finance, the Israel Airports Authority and the Israel Tax Authority, and offers passengers a private check-in, security and customs process, lounge space, and vehicle transfers to and from their aircraft for a fee.

==== International low-cost and domestic terminal ====
After reopening for domestic flights in 2007, Terminal 1 was also used from July 2008 for summer charter and low-cost international flights. It closed again for further renovation in October 2008 and reopened in summer 2009. In 2015, following another expansion, the Israel Airports Authority opened Terminal 1 to all low-cost carriers under certain conditions. Flights using Terminal 1 pay lower airport fees than those using Terminal 3.

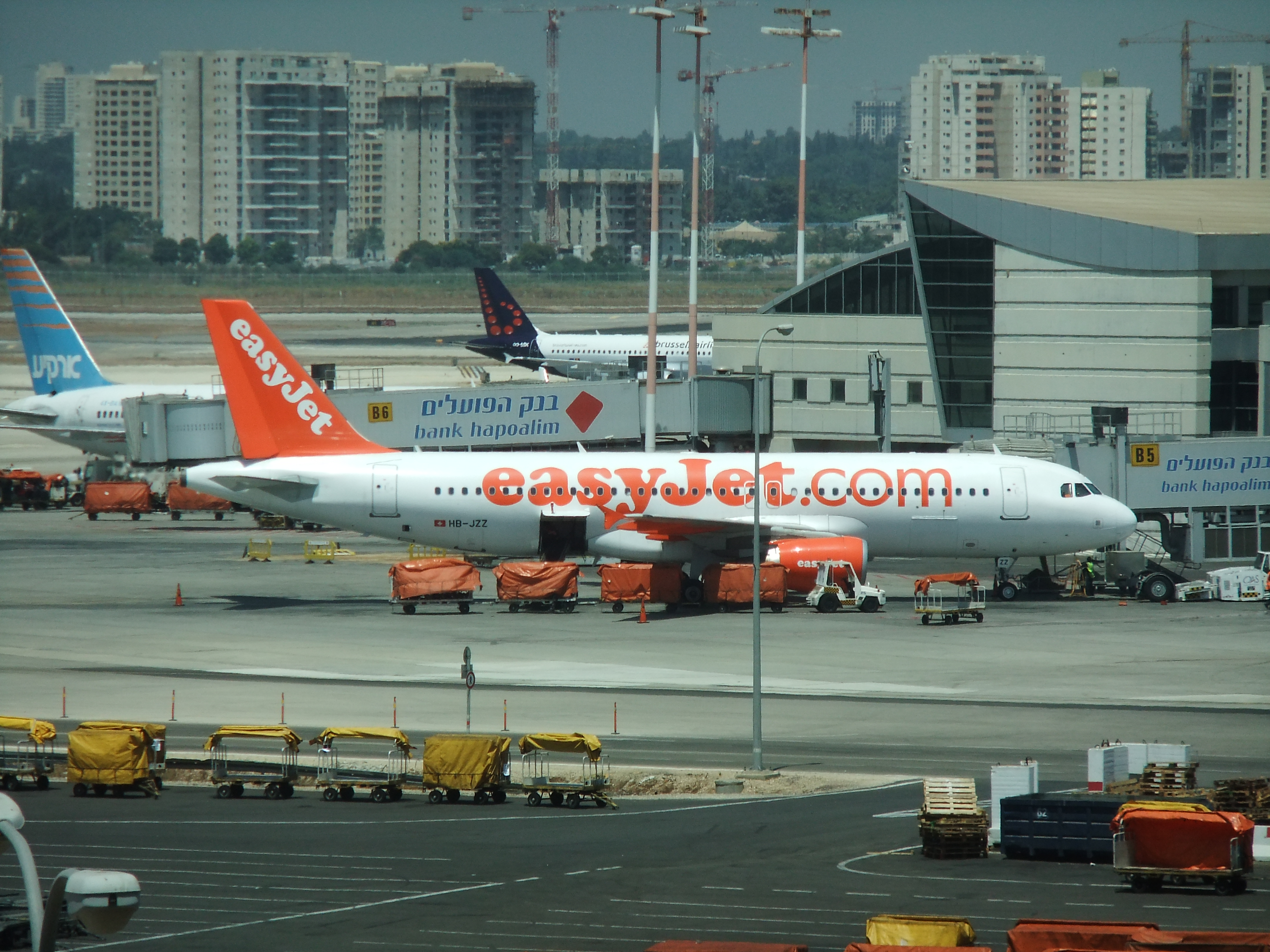
An easyJet Switzerland Airbus A320 at Terminal 3

=== Terminal 3 ===
Terminal 3 was inaugurated in late 2004, with Prime Minister Ariel Sharon speaking at the ceremony on 28 October, and opened to passengers the following month, replacing Terminal 1 as the main international gateway to and from Israel. The building was designed by Skidmore, Owings & Merrill (SOM). Moshe Safdie & Associates and TRA (now Black & Veatch) designed a linking structure and the airside departure areas and gates. Ram Karmi and other Israeli architects were the local architects of record.

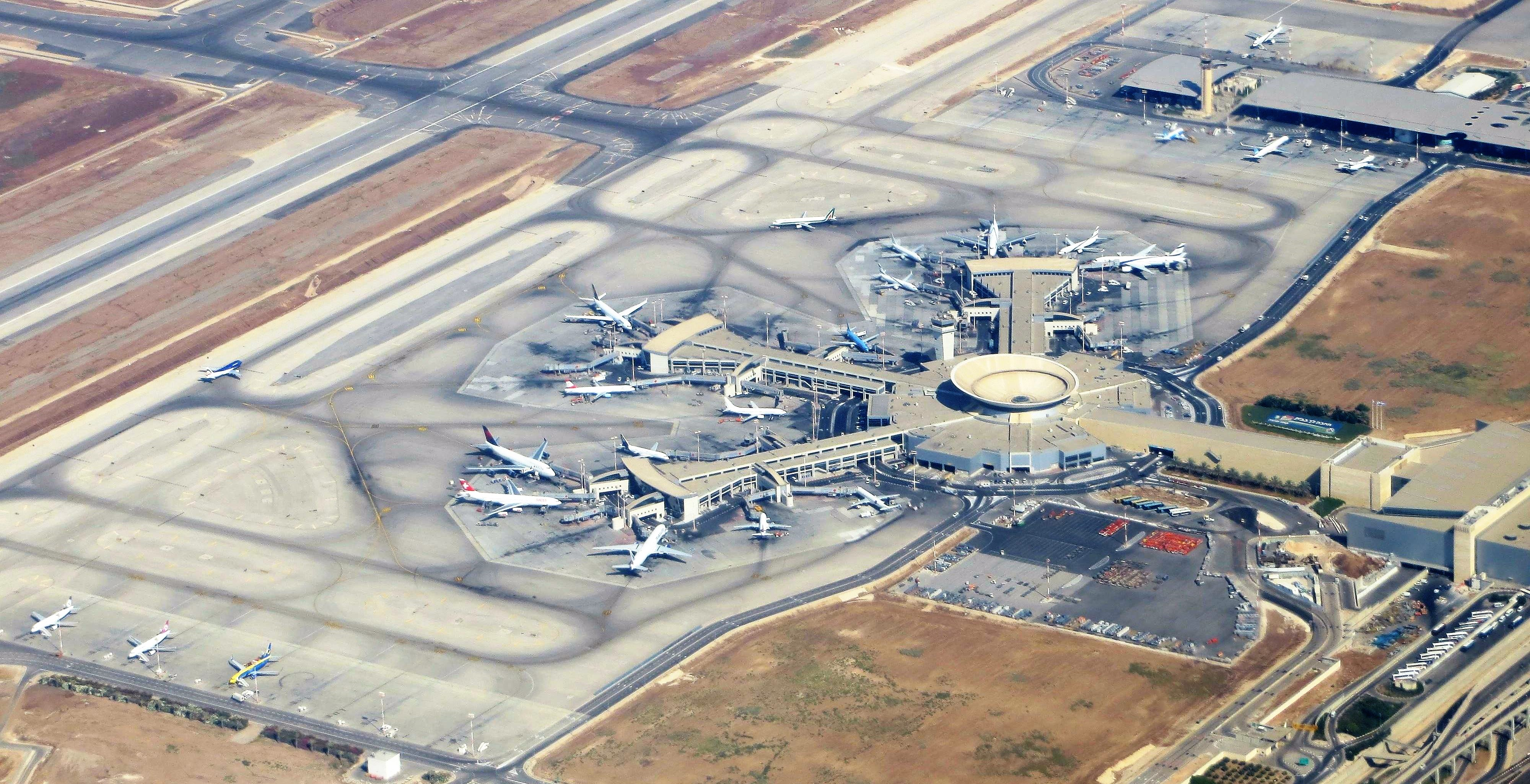
Aerial view of Terminal 3

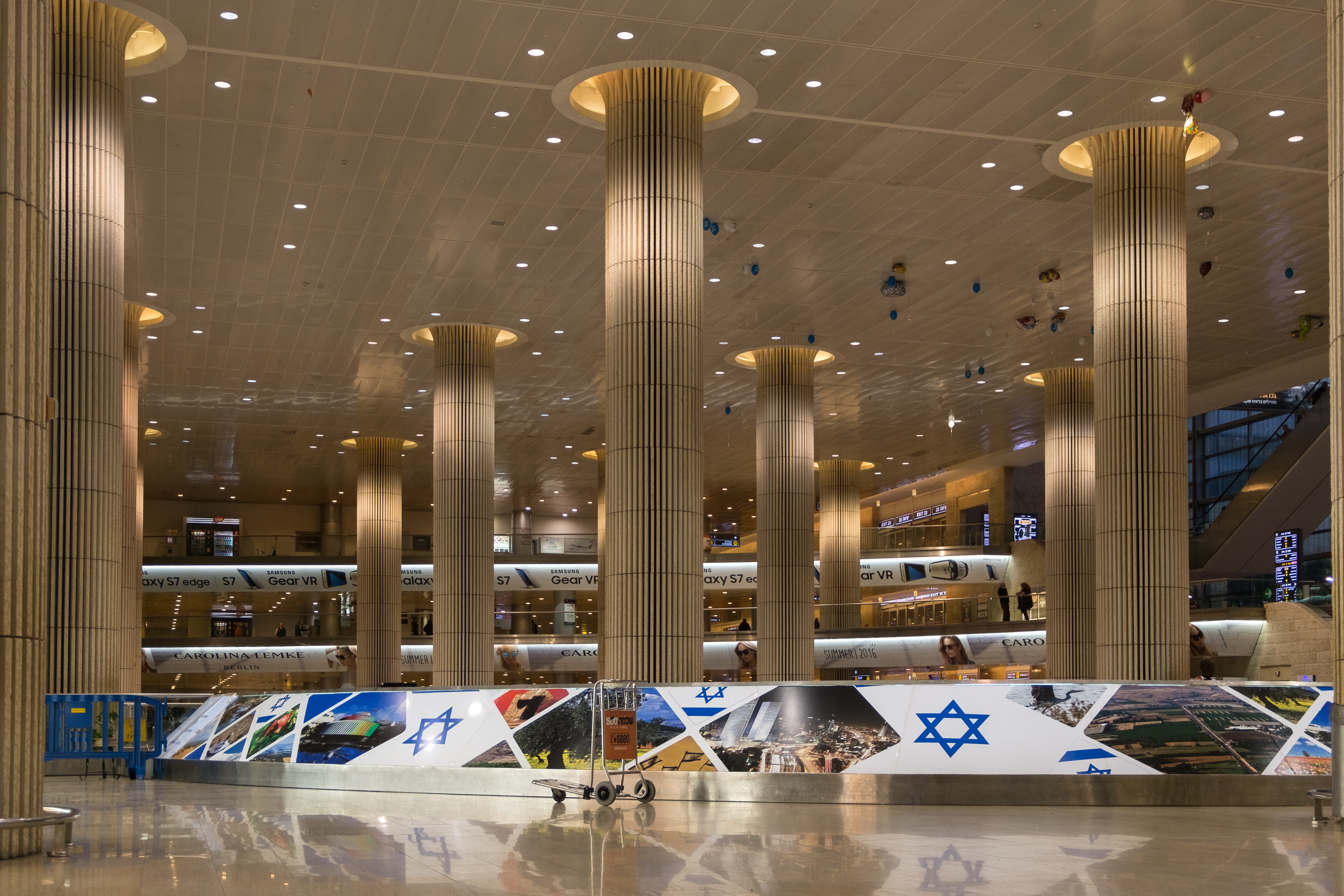
Terminal 3 arrivals hall

The design was intended to reflect what its architects saw as the emotional character of arrival in and departure from Israel; Hamid Kia, the lead architect at SOM, contrasted air travel in the United States, where "not many people are greeted upon arrival", with Israel, where "departure or arrival is a very emotional experience". Safdie's firm designed the connector between the landside and airside buildings so that arriving and departing passengers share a single volume and can see one another through a glass partition, with views towards the Judean Hills and a garden planted with the Seven Species. The departures rotunda is covered by an inverted dome suspended above the concourse beneath a white fabric ceiling that diffuses daylight, while the arrivals hall is arranged around a central fountain, with tiered balconies and monumental columns. Vertical surfaces are clad in Jerusalem stone, used together with exposed white architectural concrete, glass and aluminium.

The upper level departures hall, with an area of over 10,000 m^{2} (110,000 sq ft), has 110 check-in counters and flight information display systems. The same level houses a retail and dining area, Buy & Bye, which is open to the general public as well as to passengers and includes shops, restaurants and a post office. Passport control and the security check are entered from this level, and a tilted glass wall gives views of aircraft taking off and landing. The arrivals hall is on the ground floor, which also has 20 additional check-in counters serving Star Alliance airlines, and car rental counters are on an intermediate level between the two halls. Terminal 3 has two synagogues, one in the greeters' hall and one in the duty-free hall, both open around the clock.

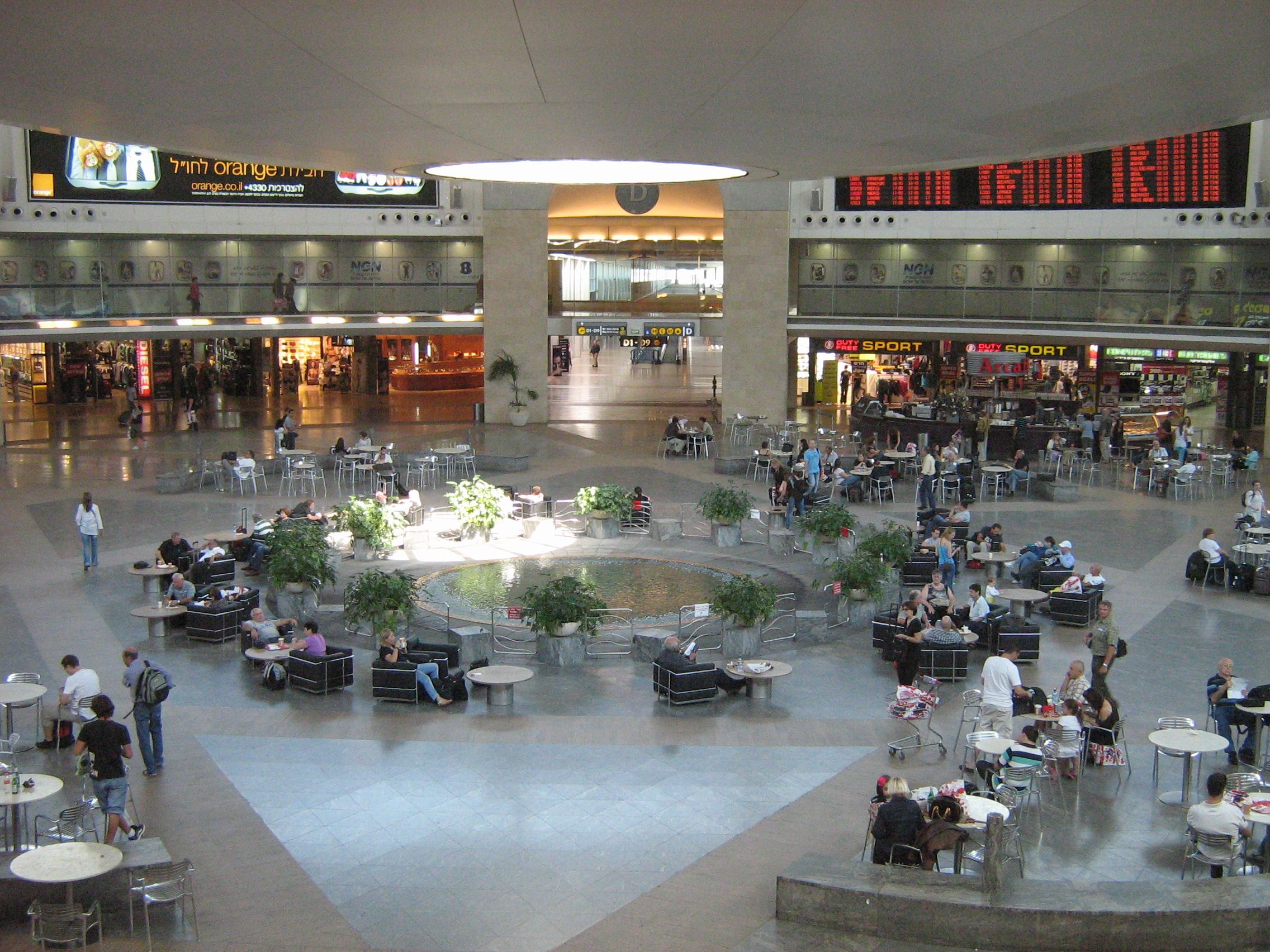
Airside duty-free rotunda, Terminal 3 departures

After the main security check, passengers wait for their flights in the star-shaped duty-free rotunda. A variety of cafes, restaurants and duty-free shops are located there, open 24 hours a day, as well as a synagogue, banking facilities, a transit hall for connecting passengers and a desk for VAT refunds.

Terminal 3 has a total of 40 gates divided among four concourses (B, C, D, and E), each with 8 jet bridge-equipped gates (numbered 2 through 9), as well as two stand gates (bus bays 1 and 1A) from which passengers are ferried to aircraft. Two gates in Concourse E use dual jet bridges for more efficient processing of very large widebody aircraft. Concourses B, C, and D were opened when Terminal 3 opened in 2004, while concourse E was completed in 2018.

The terminal has several business lounges, including the exclusive El Al King David Lounge on Concourse D for El Al first- and business-class passengers and club members, as well as the pay-to-enter JETEX lounge on Concourse C and the Aspire Lounge on Concourse E.

Plans for a hotel near Terminal 3 were first announced in 2007, but tenders issued in 2015 and 2017 drew no bidders, and the project advanced only after the tender was reissued on improved terms.

=== Former and unopened terminals ===
==== Terminal 2 ====
Terminal 2 was inaugurated in 1969 when Arkia resumed operations at the airport after the Six-Day War, mainly serving domestic flights, though it also handled international flights at various times. After domestic services were transferred to the refurbished Terminal 1 in 2007, activity at Terminal 2 declined, and it was subsequently demolished; a building on the site is now used by UPS.

==== Terminal 4 ====
This terminal, built in 1999, was meant to handle the crowds expected in 2000, but never officially opened. To date, it has only been used as a terminal for passengers arriving from Asia during the SARS epidemic.

== Expansion and development ==
In December 2017, the IAA announced a $1.43 billion expansion plan for Ben Gurion Airport, intended to keep pace with passenger numbers that were forecast to grow by roughly half over the following five years. The plan included 86 additional check-in counters, self-service check-in kiosks, six additional baggage-screening machines, eight new jet bridges and two additional bus gates for Terminal 3, together with a new terminal dedicated to domestic flights, to be built as domestic services transferred from the closing Sde Dov Airport.

In the meantime, to ease overcrowding at Terminal 3's check-in area, the IAA erected a temporary tent covering about 2,450 square metres (26,400 sq ft) and connected to the terminal's eastern wing, providing 26 additional check-in positions, which opened in mid-2018 as a stopgap pending a permanent extension.

In August 2018, the IAA published a tender for the construction and operation of a new terminal, dedicated to handling private and executive aircraft traffic.

In November 2022, construction began on a new western interchange connecting the airport to Highway 1 near Kfar Chabad, at an estimated cost of about NIS 1 billion. Most of its traffic will run through tunnels beneath the highway, and is meant to cut the driving distance from the Tel Aviv–Jerusalem direction by roughly 10 kilometres (6.2 mi), reducing entry time to the terminal area by about half; construction was expected to take about four years.

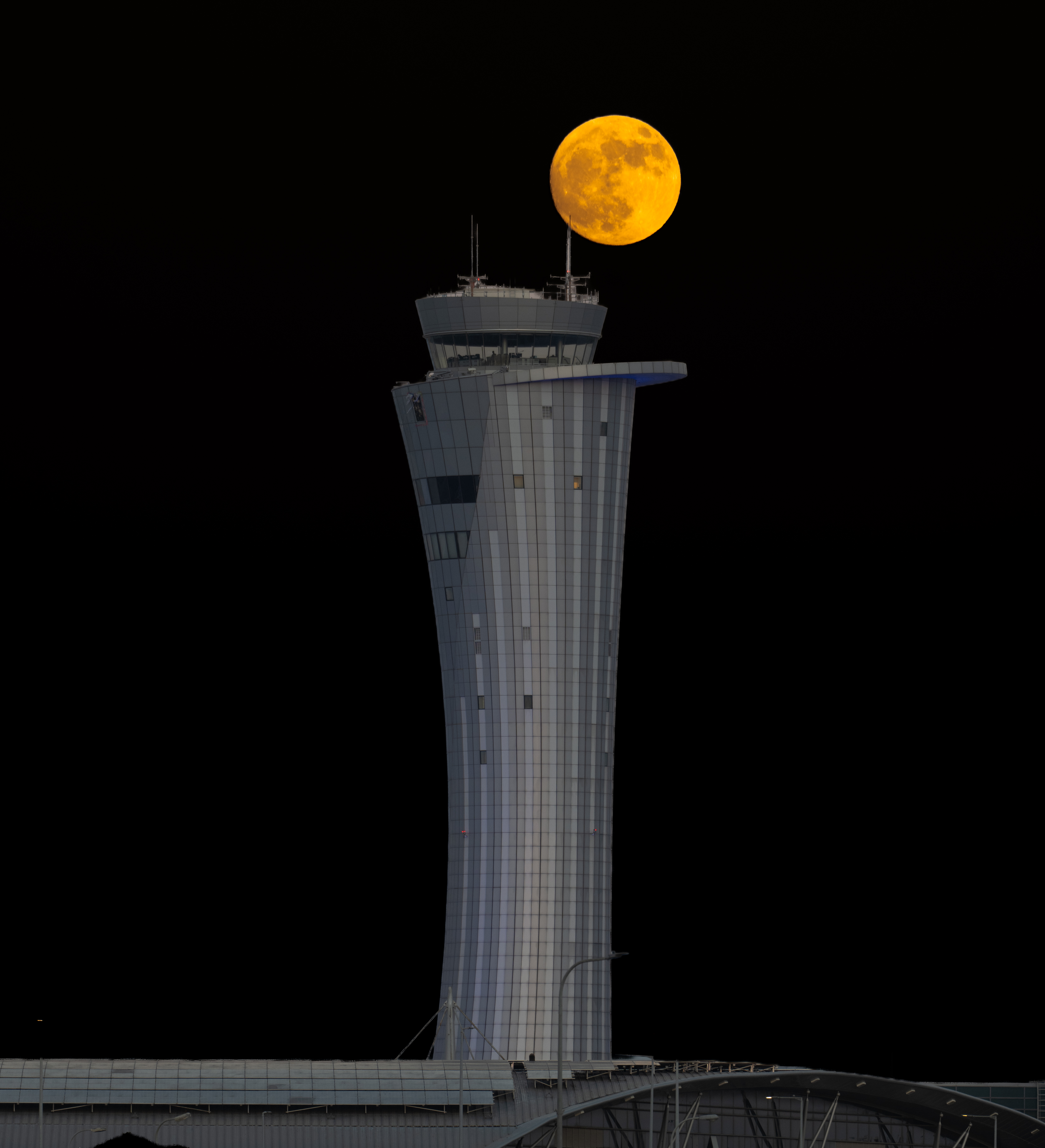
The air traffic control tower, completed in 2015, at night

A new air traffic control tower was built next to Terminal 3 to replace an older tower dating from 1985. Completed in 2015 and standing approximately 100 metres (330 ft) tall, it was designed by Pelleg Architects, with Leo A. Daly as architect of record, and built by Danya Cebus for the Israel Airports Authority. Its height allows controllers to oversee the whole airfield with minimal blind spots. The tower stood empty for several months after its official opening because of a labour dispute between air traffic controllers and the Israel Airports Authority, and did not become fully operational until late 2015.

In June 2026, Israel's planning authorities approved a building permit for the airport's first on-site hotel: a five-star, eight-storey property developed by Brown Hotels (part of the Israel Canada group), to be built above a planned baggage-screening facility on the eastern side of Terminal 3 and covering about 32,000 square metres (340,000 sq ft), with around 260 rooms.

== Office buildings ==
The Airport City development, a large office park, is located east of the main airport property. It is at the junction of the Jerusalem and Tel Aviv metropolitan areas.

The head office of El Al is located at Ben Gurion Airport.

The head offices of the Civil Aviation Authority and Challenge Airlines IL are located in the Airport City office park nearby the airport.

Israel Aerospace Industries maintains its head office on airport grounds as well as extensive aviation construction and repair facilities.

== Runways ==
=== Main runway ===
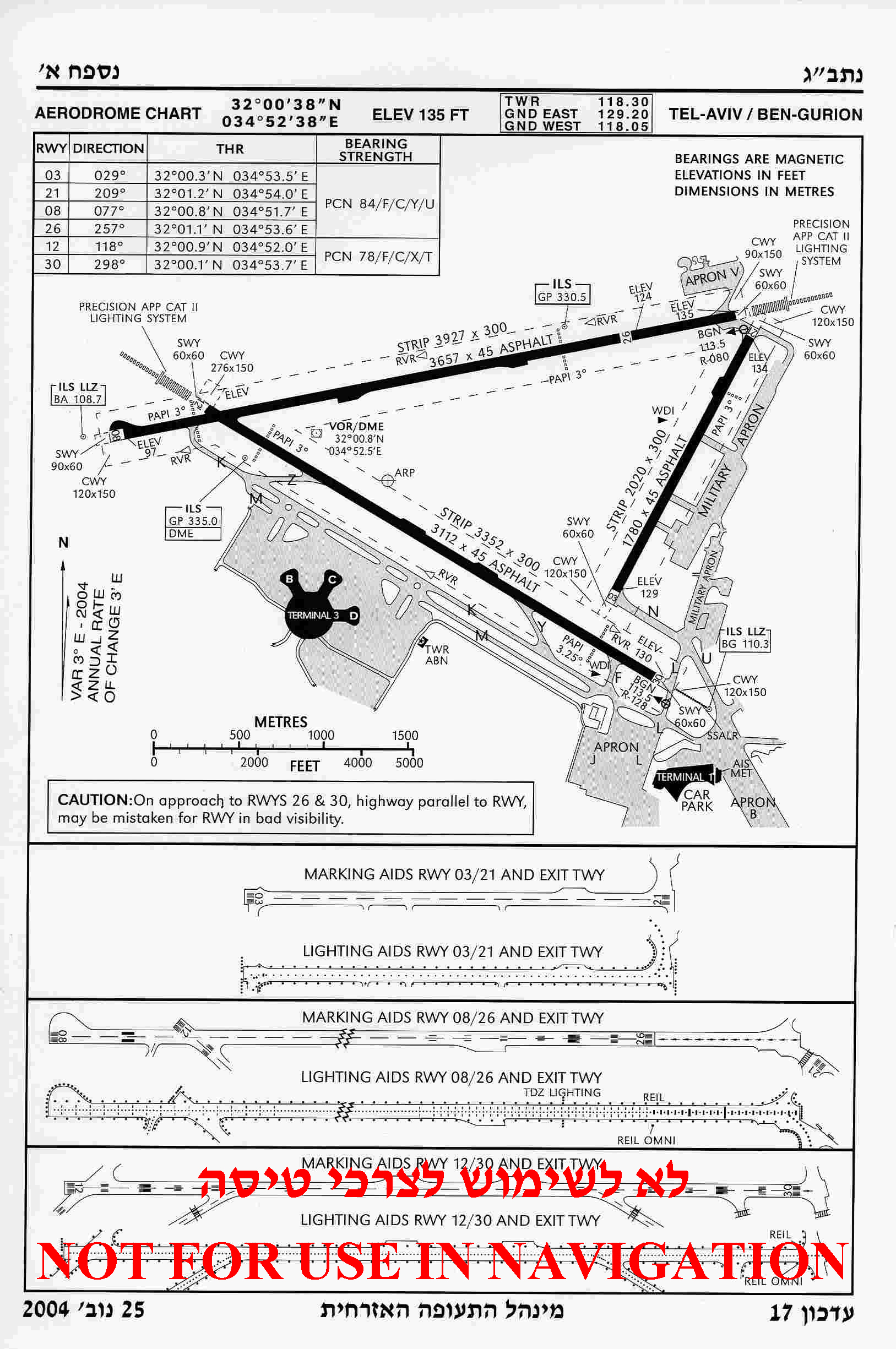
Runway and taxiway layout before the reconfiguration completed in 2014

The closest runway to terminals 1 and 3 is 12/30, 3,112 m (10,210 ft) in length, and is followed by a taxiway. Most landings take place on this runway from west to east, approaching from the Mediterranean Sea over southern Tel Aviv. It was closed for three months in 2018 for resurfacing, a project completed two months ahead of schedule.

=== Quiet runway ===
Airport layout following the runway and taxiway reconstruction and reconfiguration completed in 2014

The longest runway at the airfield, 4,062 m (13,327 ft), and the main take off runway from east to west (direction 08/26), is referred to as "the quiet runway" since jets taking off in this direction produce less noise pollution. A NIS 24 million renovation project completed in February 2006 reinforced the runway and made it suitable for wide-body aircraft such as Airbus A380.

=== History and development ===
The main runway (12/30) is the oldest surviving runway in the airport, with the quiet (08/26) and short (03/21) runways having been built in the late 1960s and 1970s. Since very little commercial traffic could operate on the short runway, for approximately forty years, the airport mostly relied on runways 12/30 and 08/26. This presented a problem, however: the fact that these two runways intersected near their western end created a crisscross pattern between aircraft landing and taking off, which reduced the number of aircraft that could arrive at and depart from the airport at peak times and imposed operational restrictions.

With passenger traffic projected to increase, plans were drawn in the 1980s and 90s for the extension of runways 03/21 and 08/26 as a means of alleviating some of Ben Gurion's safety and capacity concerns. These plans were approved in 1997 and construction began in 2010. The extension of runway 03/21 allows the airport to operate in an "open V" configuration, allowing for simultaneous landings and take offs on runways 08/26 and 03/21 and thus more than double the number of aircraft movements which can be handled at peak times, while increasing the overall level of air safety in and around the airport. Construction took four years and cost NIS 1 billion (financed from the Israel Airports Authority budget) and was completed 29 May 2014. It included paving 22 kilometres (14 mi) of runways and taxiways, using more than 1.5 million tons of asphalt, laying one million meters of runway lighting cables, 50,000 metres (160,000 ft) of high-voltage power lines and 10,000 light fixtures. The construction of several new taxiways between the existing runways and terminals also significantly reduced taxi times at the airport.

== Security procedures ==
=== Overview ===
Security at Ben Gurion International Airport operates on several levels.

All cars, taxis, buses and trucks go through a preliminary security checkpoint before entering the airport compound. Armed guards spot-check the vehicles by looking into cars, taxis and boarding buses, exchanging a few words with the driver and passengers. Armed security personnel stationed at the terminal entrances keep a close watch on those who enter the buildings. If someone arouses their suspicion or looks nervous, they may strike up a conversation to further assess the person's intent. Plainclothes armed personnel patrol the area outside the building, and hidden surveillance cameras operate at all times. Inside the building, both uniformed and plainclothes security officers are on constant patrol. Departing passengers are personally questioned by security agents before arriving at the check-in desk.

Until August 2007, Arab passengers' luggage and passports were marked with colour-coded labels, a practice reported as discriminatory and discontinued that year. The Israel Airports Authority rejected the allegations, saying that it treated all passengers with respect.

=== Baggage screening ===
After check-in, all checked baggage is screened using X-ray and CT scanners and put in a pressure chamber to trigger any possible explosive devices which have a trigger dependent on air pressure. Following the check-in process, passengers continue to personal security and passport control. Before passing through the metal detectors and putting carry-on baggage through the X-ray machine at the security checkpoint, passports and boarding passes are re-inspected and additional questions may be asked. Before boarding the aircraft, passports and boarding passes are verified once again. Security procedures for incoming flights are not as stringent, but passengers may be questioned by passport control depending on country of origin, or countries visited prior to arrival in Israel. Passengers who have recently visited Arab countries are subject to further questioning.

=== Ethnic profiling and legal challenges ===
The airport's security model relies heavily on profiling and on the questioning of passengers rather than on screening technology alone, an approach that supporters credit with the absence of a successful attack on a departing aircraft for more than four decades. Pini Schiff, a former head of security at the airport, has argued that Israel "can't afford an attack" because "a terrorist attack at an airport is more than an attack, it's a hit on the reputation of the entire country", while the aviation security consultant Nerri Yarkoni has said that "if you don't profile, you'll lose aviation".

The approach has drawn sustained criticism from Israeli civil-rights organisations, which say it subjects Arab citizens of Israel and Palestinian travellers to systematically harsher treatment. According to the legal centre Adalah, passengers are assigned a security classification numbered from one to six after initial questioning, with Arab passengers generally receiving the two highest ratings, and may then be subjected to repeated questioning, manual searches of their luggage, body searches and escorting through the terminal, a process the organisation says averages about three hours.

In 2007 the Association for Civil Rights in Israel (ACRI) petitioned the Supreme Court of Israel against the Airports Authority, the General Security Service and the Ministry of Transport, seeking an end to the use of Arab nationality as a criterion in security screening. The state told the court that the security service and the Airports Authority had begun an internal review in 2006 with the aim of eliminating differences in the screening of Israeli citizens, and that a new checked-baggage inspection system, which became operational in March 2014, had removed the need for open searches of luggage in the check-in area. In March 2015 the court dismissed the petition without ruling on whether ethnicity could be used as a screening criterion, holding that the authorities should first be allowed to complete the changes and assess their effect; in recognition of the petition's role in bringing them about, it ordered the state to pay the petitioners' costs of NIS 30,000. ACRI called the ruling a missed opportunity to end formal ethnic discrimination at Israel's airports, arguing that Arab citizens continued to face separate and degrading inspections. Yarkoni has acknowledged that the system may be "too blunt and unjust by singling out too many Arabs", but argues for refining profiling rather than abandoning it.

== Aviation safety ==
In February 2007, Transport Minister Shaul Mofaz set up a review panel under former Israeli Air Force commander Maj. Gen. (res.) Amos Lapidot to examine civil aviation safety across Israel. When the panel reported in August 2007, it concluded that air traffic control at the airport still relied on outdated technology, that unlicensed radio broadcasts were causing persistent interference with controllers' communications, and that shared use of the airspace by military and civilian traffic had left it congested and badly coordinated. Among its recommendations were an overhaul of the Israel Airports Authority's operating regulations and the creation of a separate body to oversee aviation safety. A separate assessment by the U.S. Federal Aviation Administration raised similar concerns about outdated equipment, short runways and the mixing of civilian and military traffic in a congested airspace; the FAA subsequently downgraded its safety rating for Israeli civil aviation oversight in 2008.

The rating was restored to Category 1 in November 2012, after new safety measures were installed at Ben Gurion Airport and new aviation legislation and regulations were adopted.

== Airlines and destinations ==
=== Passenger ===
The following airlines serve regular scheduled and charter destinations at Ben Gurion Airport.

Airlines	Destinations
Aegean Airlines	Athens, Larnaca, Thessaloniki; Seasonal: Heraklion, Rhodes
Air Canada	Toronto–Pearson (resumes 30 November 2026)
Air Europa	Madrid
Air France	Paris–Charles de Gaulle
Air India	Delhi (resumes 1 December 2026)
Air Seychelles	Mahé
airBaltic	Riga
airHaifa	Eilat
American Airlines	New York–JFK (resumes 29 March 2027)
Animawings	Bucharest–Otopeni (suspended)
Arkia	Amsterdam, Athens, Baku, Bangkok–Suvarnabhumi, Barcelona, Basel/Mulhouse, Batumi, Belgrade, Budapest, Dubai–International, Eilat, Geneva, Hanoi, Lisbon, London–Stansted, Málaga, Marrakesh (resumes 4 January 2027) Milan–Malpensa, Munich, New York–JFK, Paphos, Paris–Charles de Gaulle, Prague, Rome–Fiumicino, Sofia, Tallinn (begins 1 April 2027), Tbilisi, Thessaloniki, Tirana, Vienna, Vilnius, Yerevan (resumes 2 April 2027); Seasonal: Corfu, Heraklion, Ibiza, Kalamata, Mahé, Manila (begins 3 January 2027), Mykonos, Poprad, Preveza/Lefkada, Phuket, Reykjavík-Keflavík (begins 22 June 2027), Rhodes, Tivat, Verona, Zanzibar
Austrian Airlines	Vienna
Azerbaijan Airlines	Baku
azimuth	Krasnodar, Mineralnye Vody, Sochi
Belavia	Minsk
Bluebird Airways	Amsterdam, Athens, Barcelona, Bergamo, Berlin, Bologna, Bucharest–Otopeni, Budapest, Heraklion, Larnaca, Munich, Naples, Paphos, Prague, Rome–Fiumicino, Vienna; Seasonal: Burgas, Chania, Corfu, Düsseldorf, Kos, Mykonos, Preveza/Lefkada, Rhodes
British Airways	London–Heathrow
Brussels Airlines	Brussels
Bulgaria Air	Sofia
Centrum Air	Samarqand, Tashkent
Condor	Frankfurt
Cyprus Airways	Larnaca
Delta Air Lines	Atlanta (suspended until 18 December 2026), Boston (suspended), New York–JFK
Druk Air	Seasonal charter: Paro
El Al	Amsterdam, Athens, Bangkok–Suvarnabhumi, Barcelona, Berlin, Boston, Bucharest–Otopeni, Budapest, Buenos Aires–Ezeiza (begins 29 November 2026), Dubai–International, Frankfurt, Geneva, Lisbon, London–Heathrow, London–Luton, Los Angeles, Madrid, Miami, Milan–Malpensa, Moscow–Domodedovo (suspended until 25 March 2027), Munich, New York–JFK, Newark, Paris–Charles de Gaulle, Phuket, Prague, Rome–Fiumicino, San Francisco, Seoul–Incheon (begins 27 March 2027), Sofia, Tokyo–Narita, Venice, Vienna, Zürich
Ethiopian Airlines	Addis Ababa
Etihad Airways	Abu Dhabi
Eurowings	Düsseldorf, Hamburg
Flydubai	Dubai–International (suspended)
FlyOne	Bucharest–Otopeni, Chișinău Yerevan
Hainan Airlines	Beijing–Capital, Shenzhen (all flights suspended)
HiSky	Bucharest–Otopeni, Chișinău
Iberia Express	Madrid
Israir	Athens, Basel/Mulhouse, Baku, Bari, Batumi, Berlin, Bologna, Bucharest–Otopeni, Budapest, Dubai-International, Düsseldorf, Larnaca, London–Luton, Madrid, Milan–Malpensa, New York–JFK, Rome–Fiumicino, Tbilisi, Thessaloniki, Tirana, Tivat, Vilnius; Seasonal: Catania, Corfu, Málaga, Sarajevo, Stuttgart, Verona; Seasonal charter: Plovdiv, Rovaniemi, Varna, Zanzibar
ITA Airways	Rome–Fiumicino
KLM	Amsterdam
LOT Polish Airlines	Kraków, Warsaw–Chopin
Lufthansa	Frankfurt, Munich
Neos	Milan–Malpensa, Verona
Qanot Sharq	Tashkent, Samarqand
Red Wings Airlines	Moscow–Zhukovsky, Sochi
SKY Express	Athens
SkyUp Airlines	Chișinău
Smartwings	Prague
Sundor	Belgrade, Chișinău, Kraków, Larnaca, Marrakesh (begins 15 December 2026), Naples, Paphos, Lyon, Porto, Tbilisi, Tirana, Warsaw–Chopin; Seasonal: Basel, Batumi, Cagliari, Catania, Copenhagen, Dubrovnik, Heraklion, Kefalonia, Mykonos, Rhodes, Salzburg, Varna, Verona, Zagreb
Swiss International Air Lines	Zürich
TAP Air Portugal	Lisbon (suspended until 27 March 2027)
TAROM	Bucharest–Otopeni
Transavia	Lyon, Marseille, Paris–Orly; Seasonal: Nice (begins 23 December 2026)
TUS Airways	Bergamo, Bologna, Larnaca, Naples, Paphos, Rome–Fiumicino
United Airlines	Chicago–O'Hare, Newark, San Francisco (resumes 28 March 2027), Washington–Dulles
Uzbekistan Airways	Samarqand, Tashkent
Wizz Air	Athens, Bratislava, Bucharest–Otopeni, Budapest, Catania, Cluj-Napoca, Debrecen (suspended), Heraklion (suspended), Iași, Kraków, Larnaca, London–Gatwick, London–Luton, Milan–Malpensa, Naples, Palermo, Rhodes (suspended), Rome–Fiumicino, Sofia, Thessaloniki (resumes 29 March 2027), Varna, Venice, Vilnius, Warsaw–Chopin

=== Cargo ===
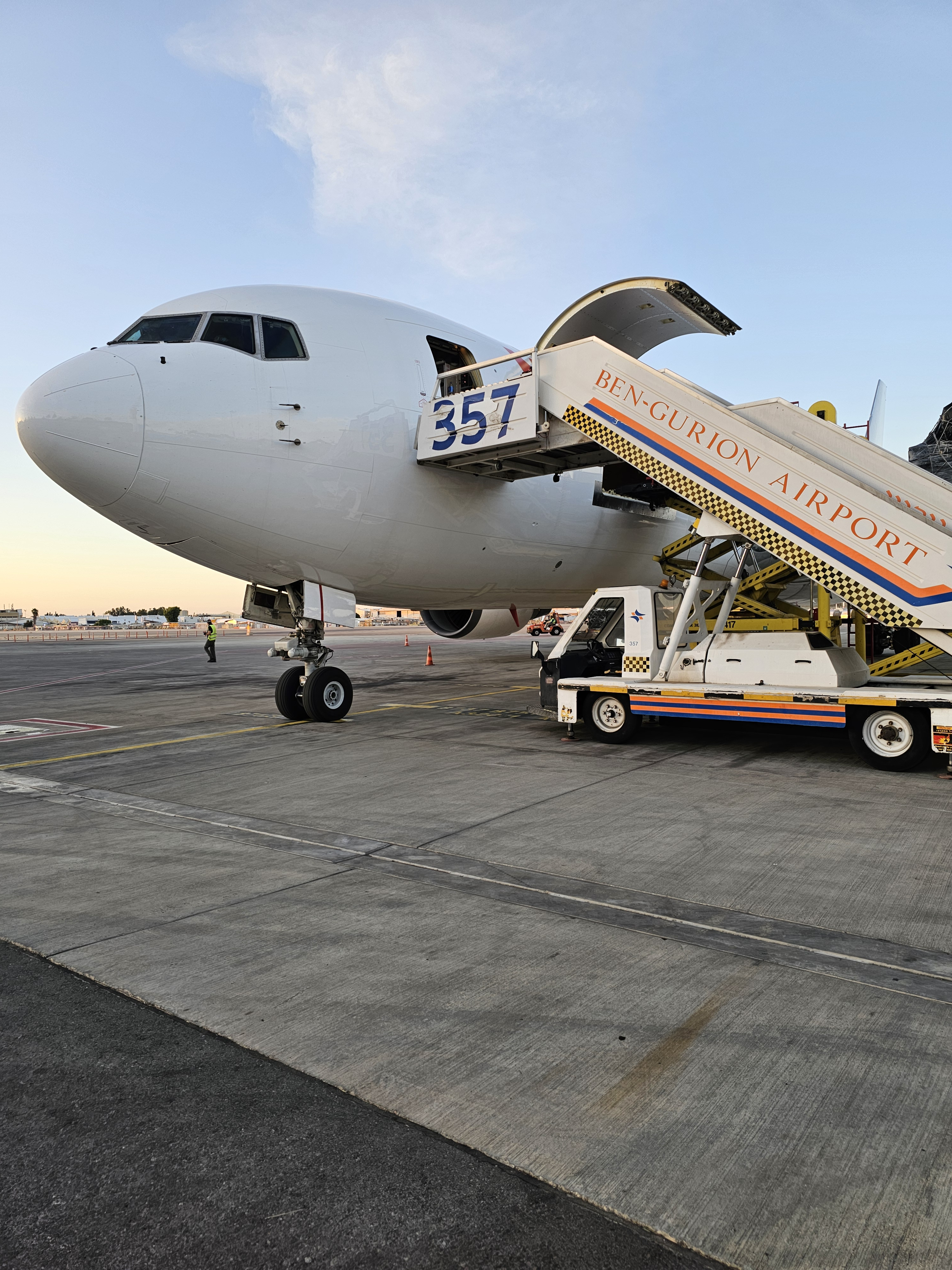
My Freighter Airlines (Uzbekistan) Boeing 767-300F on apron stand in Ben Gurion Airport

Cargo activity at the airport grew by 9.5 percent in 2025. Challenge Airlines was the largest dedicated freighter operator, while El Al carried most of the cargo transported in the holds of passenger aircraft.

Airlines	Destinations
ASL Airlines	Leipzig/Halle
Astral Aviation	Nairobi–Jomo Kenyatta
Cargoair	Cologne/Bonn
Challenge Airlines	Almaty, Athens, Dubai-Al Maktoum, Helsinki, Hong Kong, Larnaca, Liège, Milan-Malpensa, New York–JFK, Oslo
DHL Aviation	Leipzig/Halle
El Al Cargo	Frankfurt, Liège, Lublin, New York–JFK, Seoul–Incheon
Kalitta Air	Almaty, Dubai, Hong Kong
Lufthansa Cargo	Frankfurt
My Freighter	Tashkent
Silk Way West Airlines	Baku
UPS Airlines	Cologne/Bonn, Larnaca

== Statistics ==
Domestic flights from Sde Dov Airport, which closed in July 2019, were transferred to Ben Gurion.

Usage statistics for commercial operations
Year	Passengers	Change	Flights	Change
1999	8,916,436			
2000	9,879,470	▲10.8%	80,187	
2001	8,349,657	▼15.5%	69,226	▼13.7%
2002	7,308,977	▼12.5%	63,206	▼8.7%
2003	7,392,026	▲1.1%	61,202	▼3.2%
2004	8,051,895	▲8.9%	66,638	▲8.9%
2005	8,917,421	▲10.7%	70,139	▲5.3%
2006	9,221,558	▲3.4%	76,735	▲9.4%
2007	10,526,562	▲14.2%	84,568	▲10.3%
2008	11,550,433	▲9.7%	94,644	▲11.9%
2009	10,925,970	▼5.4%	89,442	▼5.5%
2010	12,160,339	▲11.3%	95,171	▲6.4%
2011	12,978,605	▲6.7%	99,527	▲4.6%
2012	13,133,992	▲1.2%	97,824	▼1.7%
2013	14,227,612	▲8.3%	104,850	▲7.2%
2014	14,925,369	▲4.9%	112,653	▲6.9%
2015	16,299,406	▲9.2%	118,861	▲5.5%
2016	17,936,810	▲10.0%	127,575	▲10.1%
2017	20,781,226	▲15.8%	142,938	▲12.9%
2018	22,949,676	▲10.8%	157,312	▲10.1%
2019	24,821,767	▲8.2%	167,886	▲6.7%
2020	4,457,439	▼80.6%	49,223	▼67.3%
2021	6,719,901	▲50.8%	75,321	▲53.0%
2022	20,008,532	▲197.8%	143,884	▲91.0%
2023	21,882,716	▲9.4%	152,411	▲5.9%
2024	14,532,427	▼33.6%	108,563	▼28.8%
2025	19,160,160	▲31.8%	140,736	▲29.6%

Busiest routes to and from TLV (2025)
Rank	Airport	Passengers	Annual change	Share	Carriers
1	Athens	1,178,745	▲21.1%	6.4%	Aegean, Arkia, Bluebird, El Al, Israir, SKY Express, Wizz
2	Dubai–International	1,119,786	▲48.6%	6.1%	Arkia, El Al, flydubai, Israir
3	Larnaca	1,012,937	▲17.3%	5.5%	Aegean, Arkia, Bluebird, Cyprus Airways, Israir, Sundor, TUS, Wizz
4	Paris–Charles de Gaulle	791,482	▲20.2%	4.3%	Air France, Arkia, El Al, Israir
5	Budapest	744,726	▲60.5%	4.0%	Arkia, Bluebird, El Al, FLYYO, Israir, TUS, Wizz
6	Eilat	686,852	▲5.4%	3.6%	Arkia, El Al, Israir
7	New York–JFK	669,475	▲26.4%	3.6%	Arkia, Delta, El Al
8	Rome–Fiumicino	642,230	▲56.3%	3.5%	Arkia, Bluebird, El Al, Israir, Wizz
9	Newark	532,120	▲38.3%	2.9%	El Al, United
10	Bucharest–Otopeni	529,462	▲28.5%	2.9%	Animawings, El Al, FlyOne, FLYYO, HiSky, Israir, TAROM, Wizz

Busiest countries served to and from TLV (2025)
Rank	Country	Passengers	Share	Annual change
1	Greece	2,285,326	12.4%	▲25.2%
2	United States	1,652,277	8.9%	▲25.0%
3	United Arab Emirates	1,527,770	8.3%	▲71.3%
4	Italy	1,269,017	6.9%	▲49.6%
5	Cyprus	1,264,412	6.8%	▲17.6%
6	France	1,074,333	5.8%	▲25.5%
7	Georgia	908,644	4.9%	▲30.7%
8	Germany	848,069	4.6%	▲42.0%
9	Hungary	748,424	4.1%	▲61.3%
10	United Kingdom	726,586	3.9%	▲15.0%

Busiest airlines serving to and from Ben Gurion Airport (2025)
Rank	Airline	Headquarters	Passengers	Share
1	El Al Israel Airlines	Israel	6,929,030	36.2%
2	Israir	Israel	2,281,480	11.9%
3	Arkia	Israel	2,149,342	11.2%
4	Wizz Air	Hungary	1,258,858	6.6%
5	Bluebird Airways	Greece	809,037	4.2%
6	flydubai	United Arab Emirates	801,379	4.2%
7	Aegean Airlines	Greece	400,732	2.1%
8	Etihad Airways	United Arab Emirates	375,598	2.0%
9	TUS Airways	Cyprus	341,051	1.8%
10	Lufthansa	Germany	321,756	1.7%

Top Dedicated Freighters serving to and from Ben Gurion Airport (2025)
Rank	Airline	Headquarters	Cargo Volume (Tons)	Share (%)	Annual change
1	Challenge Airlines	Israel	98,981	35.5%	▲21.7%
2	DHL Aviation	Germany	38,153	13.7%	▲1.9%
3	El Al Cargo	Israel	24,064	8.6%	▲20.9%
4	My Freighter Airlines	Uzbekistan	22,505	8.1%	▲34.6%
5	Silk Way West Airlines	Azerbaijan	19,662	7.1%	▼25.2%
6	Atlas Air	United States	12,160	4.4%	Steady
7	FedEx Express	United States	11,308	4.1%	▲10.5%
8	Lufthansa Cargo	Germany	10,358	3.7%	▲25.7%
9	National Airlines	United States	9,479	3.4%	▼20.0%
10	Cargoair	Bulgaria	5,190	1.9%	Steady

Top Passenger Airlines by Cargo volume (Belly Cargo) serving to and from Ben Gurion Airport (2025)
Rank	Airline	Headquarters	Cargo Volume (Tons)	Share (%)	Annual change
1	EL AL Israel Airlines	Israel	59,589	58.3%	▼13.4%
2	United Airlines	United States	7,332	7.2%	Steady
3	Hainan Airlines	China	6,977	6.8%	▲62.1%
4	Air France	France	6,117	6.0%	▲34.2%
5	Air Europa	Spain	4,135	4.0%	▲30.4%
6	flydubai	United Arab Emirates	2,269	2.2%	▲33.9%
7	Etihad Airways	United Arab Emirates	1,829	1.8%	▲166.6%
8	Azerbaijan Airlines	Azerbaijan	1,647	1.7%	Steady
9	Arkia	Israel	1,624	1.6%	Steady
10	Delta Airlines	United States	1,536	1.5%	Steady

== Ground transportation ==
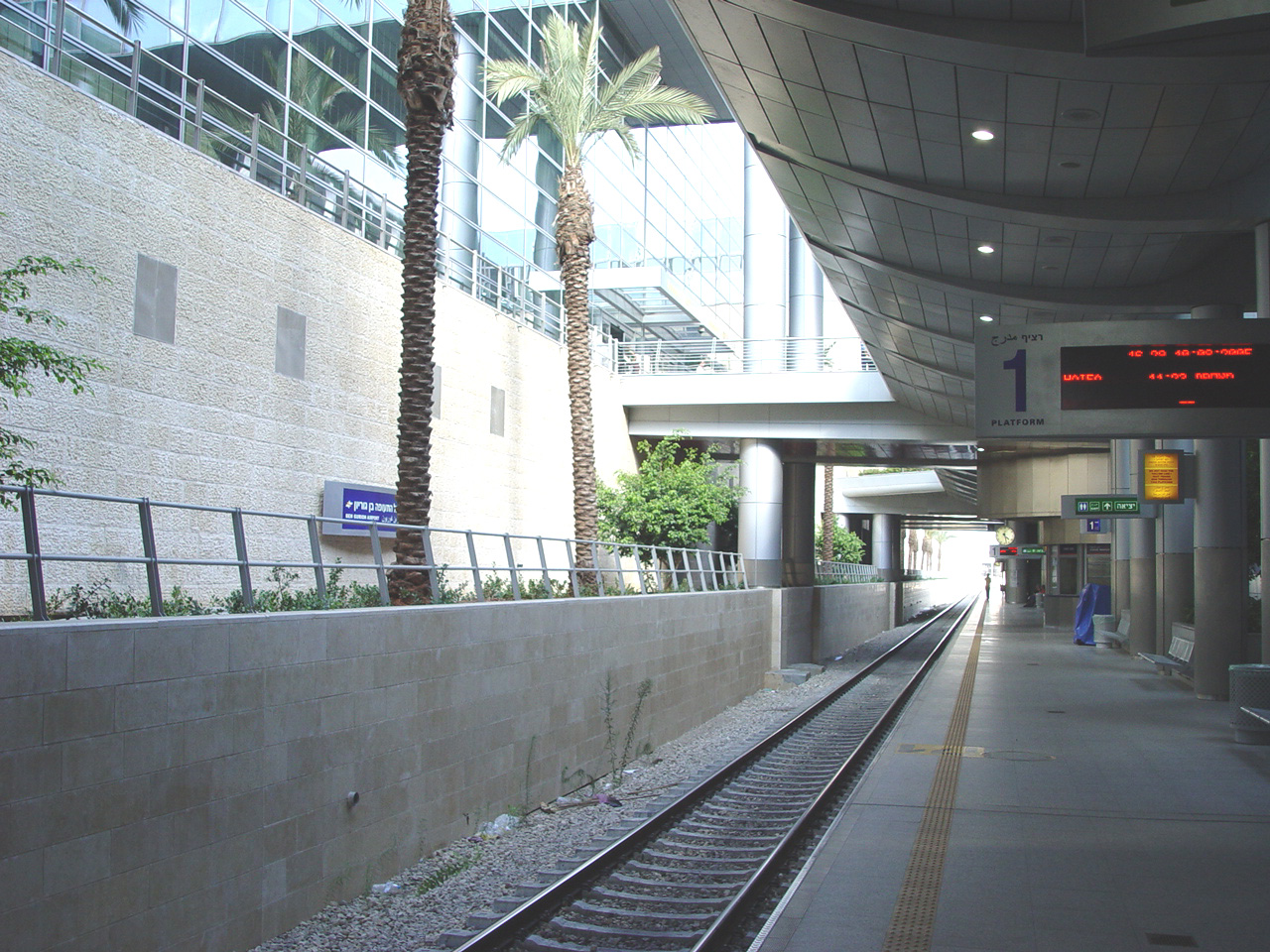
Platform 1 of the airport train station at Terminal 3

Israel Railways serves the airport railway station on the lower level of Terminal 3, running northwest towards Tel Aviv and Haifa and southeast towards Modi'in and Jerusalem; free shuttle buses connect the station to Terminal 1.

Afikim operates line 485, a direct bus service to Jerusalem, and Kavim line 445 runs to Tel Aviv, both from Level 2 of Terminal 3; Metropoline serves Beersheba, and Egged route 5 shuttles between the terminals and the Airport City business park outside the airport, where passengers can transfer to other Egged services. A free shuttle runs between the terminals roughly every 15 minutes, around the clock.

Licensed metered taxis operate 24 hours a day from both terminals. Shared taxi vans, known in Hebrew as monit sherut, also run to Jerusalem and Haifa.

The airport lies on Highway 1, the Tel Aviv–Jerusalem motorway, and has about 20,000 parking spaces; the long-term lots are several kilometres from the terminals and are reached by a free shuttle bus.

== Economic and environmental impact ==
=== Economic significance ===
Ben Gurion Airport is one of the busiest airports in the Middle East and serves as Israel's principal gateway for international trade, tourism, and business travel. Israeli media have described the airport as "a linchpin of Israel's economy and international standing, acting as a critical artery for travel, tourism, business, diplomacy, freight and more."

By the mid-2020s the airport was operating close to its capacity limits, handling as many as 2.3 to 2.6 million passengers a month during peak season. A government-approved plan to expand the airport's capacity to 40 million annual passengers was underway, while a long-delayed second international airport intended to relieve pressure on Ben Gurion remained unbuilt more than a decade after its initial approval, amid political disagreement over its location.

=== Noise pollution ===
Because of the airport's proximity to some of Israel's largest population centres, aircraft noise has long affected residents living under its flight paths, and the possibility of building another international airport elsewhere in the country has been considered partly for this reason. Under Israel Airports Authority policy, residential buildings exposed to noise levels of 65 decibels (Ldn) or higher qualify for acoustic treatment, funded and coordinated by the Authority, including sound-dampening exterior doors, windows and roofing together with air conditioning; at least a quarter of eligible buildings are treated each year. Noise-reduction measures also include routing aircraft over less populated areas where possible, developing quieter takeoff procedures, operating aircraft noise-monitoring systems, and restricting aircraft that do not meet international noise standards.

== Service quality ==
=== Passenger rankings ===
In a December 2006 Airports Council International survey of passenger satisfaction, Ben Gurion ranked first among 40 European airports and eighth of 77 airports worldwide. It was named the best airport in the Middle East in the 2007, 2008 and 2009 surveys.

=== Awards ===
Year	Award	Category	Results	Ref
2007	Airport Service Quality Awards by Airports Council International	Best Airport in Middle East	Won	
2007	Airport Service Quality Awards by Airports Council International	Best Airport by Size (5–15 million passengers)	2nd	
2008	Airport Service Quality Awards by Airports Council International	Best Airport in Middle East	Won	
2008	Airport Service Quality Awards by Airports Council International	Best Airport by Size (5–15 million passengers)	2nd	
2009	Airport Service Quality Awards by Airports Council International	Best Airport in Middle East	Won	
2010	Airport Service Quality Awards by Airports Council International	Best Airport in Middle East	3rd	
2011	Airport Service Quality Awards by Airports Council International	Best Airport in Middle East	3rd	
2012	Airport Service Quality Awards by Airports Council International	Best Airport in Middle East	4th	
2013	Airport Service Quality Awards by Airports Council International	Best Airport in Middle East	4th	
2014	Airport Service Quality Awards by Airports Council International	Best Airport in Middle East	3rd	
2015	Airport Service Quality Awards by Airports Council International	Best Airport in Middle East	3rd (tie)	

== Accidents and incidents ==
- On 13 February 1939, a Fokker F.XVIII (VQ-PAF) of the newly founded Commercial Aviation Company Ltd. was being flown around the airport for an inaugural celebration. While landing the pilot lost control and veered off into the mud, damaging it beyond repair.
- On 5 February 1950, a Douglas C-54A-10-DC (4X-ACD) of El Al skidded off during takeoff, caught fire, and was damaged beyond repair. All 50 occupants survived.
- On 15 May 1953, a Douglas C-47 of the USAF as part of a US military attaché in Israel caught fire standing at night and was burned out. Sabotage was suspected.
- On 26 October 1969, a Vickers 833 Viscount (4X-AVC) of Arkia crashed during a nighttime training flight and was damaged beyond repair. All three occupants survived.
- On 30 November 1970, a Boeing 707-373C (N790TW) of TWA was taking off for a cargo flight to Frankfurt at 02:00 on runway 30 when an empty, unlit IAF Stratocruiser (4X-FPS/037) was towed across the runway; the 707 hit the Stratocruiser and both aircraft caught fire. Both planes were damaged beyond repair, and all three crew on the 707 survived. However, two persons were killed on the ground.
- On 8 May 1972, Sabena Flight 571 was hijacked by Black September militants and flown to the airport, where Israeli commandos stormed the aircraft the next day; one passenger was fatally wounded.
- On 30 May 1972, three Japanese Red Army members opened fire in the arrivals hall, killing 26 people in the Lod Airport massacre.
- On 16 August 1973, a Boeing 720-023B (OD-AFR) of MEA was hijacked en route from Benghazi to Beirut over Cyprus by a male hijacker with two guns who demanded to be flown to Ben Gurion; he was overpowered by ground police upon arrival.
- On 31 July 1980, a Boeing 707-358C (4X-ATX) of El Al had a fire erupt in the rear lavatory prior to departure at Ben Gurion; the aircraft was evacuated and fire services had to cut a hole in the fuselage to put out the flames. The aircraft was later repaired.
- On 16 February 1987, a Convair CV-240-24 (N93218) of IAI was destroyed in a hangar fire.
- On 1 December 1988: 1988 Ordzhonikidze bus hijacking. Five men in Ordzhonikidze hijacked a school bus, demanding 2,000,000 rubles and an airplane to fly them to Israel. The bus went to Mineralnye Vody Airport and the hijackers boarded an Ilyushin Il-76T of Aeroflot in exchange for 30 hostages. The plane arrived at Ben Gurion the following day, and the hijackers surrendered.
- On 18 June 2001, a ATR 42–320 (4X-ATK) of Israir could not lower its starboard main undercarriage and had to land without it; none of the 42 occupants were injured. The plane was written off and converted into a training rig.
- On 8 April 2015, a British Aerospace BAe 125-800A (4X-CZO) of Arrow Aviation aborted a takeoff from runway 26 due to a swerve issue, and after stopping a fire broke out in the right main gear wheel area. The plane, an air ambulance, was substantially damaged.
- On 28 March 2018, a Boeing 737-76J (WL) (D-ABLB) on Germania Flight 4915 to Berlin collided with a Boeing 767-300ER (4X-EAK) on El Al Flight 385 to Rome while both aircraft were in the pushback/towing phase at 06:22. The 737's tail fin hit the right horizontal stabilizer of the 767 after ground controllers cleared both for pushback without realizing they were blocking each other. The 737 was later repaired, but the 767 was written off.
- On 4 May 2025, a Houthi ballistic missile struck inside the airport's perimeter.

== In popular culture ==
The singer-songwriter Meir Ariel's song "Terminal Luminalette" (טרמינל לומינלט), from the 1970s, depicts a visit to the airport by a man recently discharged from psychiatric care, for whom watching aircraft take off becomes a source of emotional relief; the song has been read as a commentary on Israeli anxiety and vulnerability.

== See also ==
- Transportation in Israel
- Uri Michaeli Haifa International Airport
- List of the busiest airports in Asia
- List of the busiest airports in the Middle East
