= Cargoair =

Bulgarian cargo airline

Cargoair Карго Ер
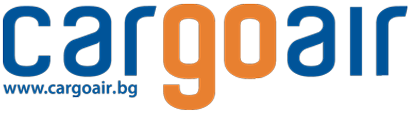

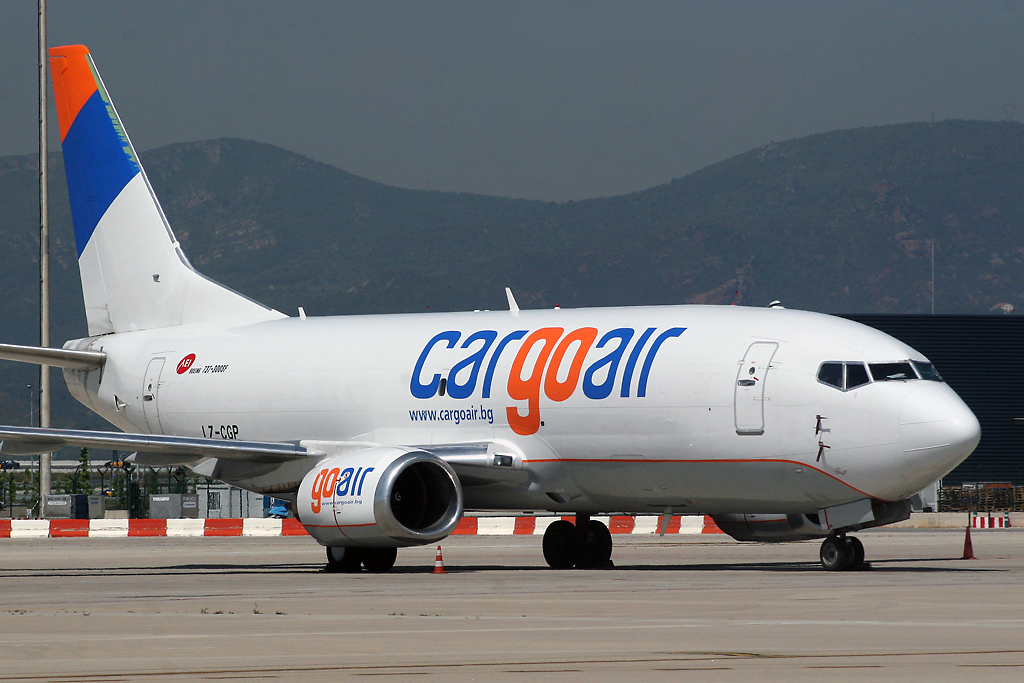
- Boeing 737-300SF
IATA	ICAO	Call sign
–	CGF	CLEVER
- Founded: November 2007
- AOC #: BG 31
- Hubs: Sofia Airport; Cologne/Bonn Airport
- Secondary hubs: Leipzig/Halle Airport
- Fleet size: 14
- Destinations: Cargo Charters
- Headquarters: Sofia, Bulgaria
- Key people: Peter Cenkov (CEO)
- Website: cargoair.bg

Cargo Air Ltd (Bulgarian: Карго Ер), branded as cargoair, is a Bulgarian cargo airline headquartered in Sofia, Bulgaria. The company operates charter flights throughout Europe and the Middle East. The airline's main bases are Leipzig/Halle Airport and Vasil Levski Sofia Airport.

== History ==
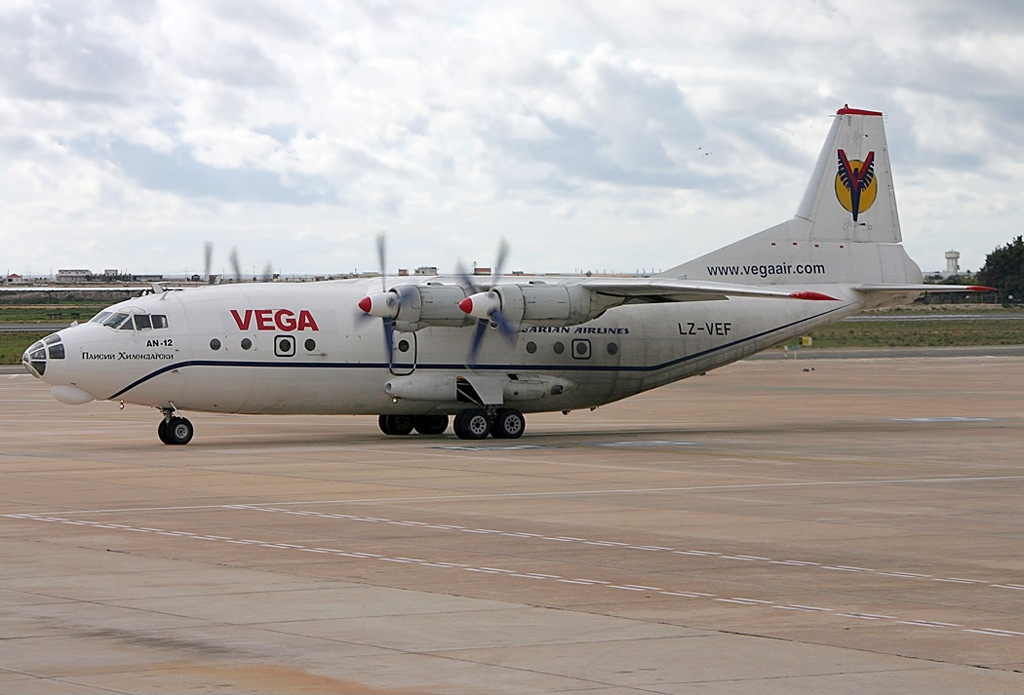
Antonov An-12

The air carrier was established on 4 July 1997 as Vega Airlines. It started unscheduled operations in November of the following year with Antonov An-12 and went on until the beginning of next decade. It halted operations and underwent a comprehensive reorganization. Firstly it was renamed Cargoair on 26 October 2006 and rebuilt in the first part of the following year. In November 2007, Cargo Air was established as General Sales Agent of the Belarusian cargo airline Ruby Star, offering to its customers' logistics services with Antonov An-12 and Ilyushin Il-76 aircraft. That same year Cargoair also purchased a Boeing 737-300F and flight operations were restarted on 15 September 15.

From July 2009 Cargo Air began operations for TNT Airways on its European network. In September 2009 Cargoair purchased a second Boeing 737-300F. Due to increasing demand for long term aircraft lease operations and ad-hoc charters, the company management decided to purchase a third Boeing 737-300F, delivered in September 2011.

In February 2013, the company purchased a passenger Boeing 737-400; its conversion to freighter configuration was completed in July 2013. On 15 July 2013 the Boeing 737-400F began commercial service for European Air Transport. In November 2013 Cargoair add second Boeing 737-400F in their fleet.

In July 2015 Cargo Air added a third Boeing 737-400F also operated for European Air Transport. In January 2016 Cargoair added fourth Boeing 737-400. In February 2016, the airline purchased two Boeing 737-800BCF.

In November and December 2016 the airline added two more Boeing 737-400F to their fleet. In summer 2017 Cargo Air started passenger/ACMI flights on behalf of Air Mediterranean and Travel Service.

== Fleet ==
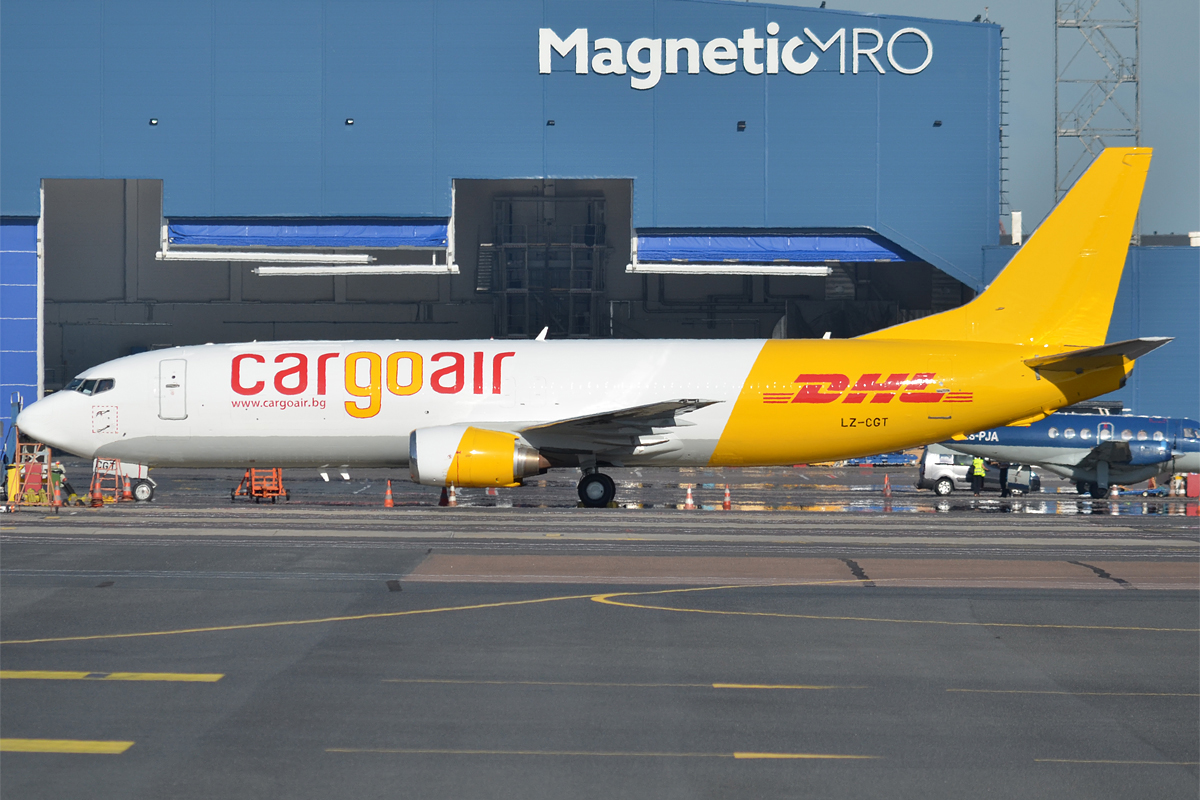
Cargoair Boeing 737-4Y0 in DHL livery at Tallinn Airport, 2015

As of August 2025, Cargoair operates the following aircraft:

Cargo Air fleet
Aircraft	Total	Orders	Notes
Boeing 737-300SF	3	—	
Boeing 737-400SF	6	—	2 operated for DHL Aviation
Boeing 737-800SF	5	—	
Total	14	—	
