= Civil Aviation Authority of Israel =

Israeli Aviation Authority

- רשות התעופה האזרחית

Agency overview
- Formed: 13 May 2005
- Jurisdiction: Government of Israel
- Minister responsible: Miri Regev
- Agency executive: Shmuel Zakai
- Parent agency: Ministry of Transport
- Website: www.caa.gov.il

The Civil Aviation Authority (CAA or CAAI, Hebrew: רשות התעופה האזרחית, romanized: Rashut HaTe'ufa HaEzraḥit, Arabic: هيئة الطيران المدني الإسرائيلية) is the civil aviation authority of Israel. Its head office is the Golan House in Airport City.

== History ==
The Civil Aviation Authority is a statutory authority which regulates aviation in the country. The former Civil Aviation Administration, which was a department of the Ministry of Transport was converted into the present authority on May 13, 2005 following the guidelines set forth in the Civil Aviation Authority Law of 2005. Its head office is in the Golan House building in the Airport City business park near Ben Gurion Airport; prior to 2010 its head office was on the airport grounds.

Its functions include regulating civil aviation according to laws, regulations, and international conventions Israel is party to, as well as advancing and promoting certain objectives such as: ensuring the utmost level of flight safety and an appropriate level of service from aviation providers, maintaining a safety net for Israeli air carriers, environmental compliance, and the implementation of government policies relating to civil aviation.

One of the authority's efforts included advising the Knesset during the formulation of the Aviation Law of 2011 (חוק הטיס) – a comprehensive piece of legislation which established a clear legal framework for most matters relating to aviation in the country, which replaced the former set of outdated and sometimes incomplete or conflicting aviation laws and regulations, some of which dated back to Mandatory times.

The Chief Investigator's office within the authority investigates aircraft accidents and serious incidents and publishes reports on those accidents and incidents.

Due to the large number of issues caused by communication problems, the CAA has ordered all Israeli pilots to take a test in basic English language comprehension, but the Israel Air Pilots Association objected to this request.
