= October 1949 =

Month of 1949

<<	October 1949					>>
Su	Mo	Tu	We	Th	Fr	Sa
						1
2	3	4	5	6	7	8
9	10	11	12	13	14	15
16	17	18	19	20	21	22
23	24	25	26	27	28	29
30	31

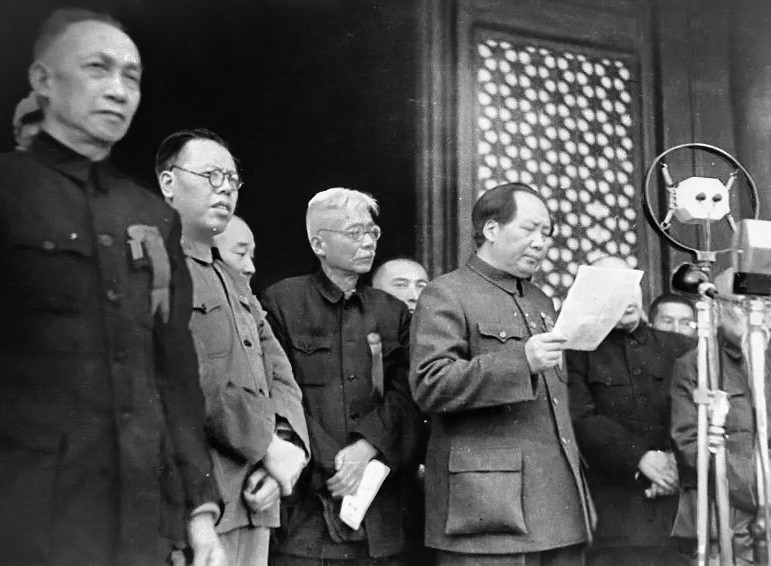
October 1: Mao Zedong proclaims the founding of the People's Republic of China.

The following events occurred in October 1949:

== October 1, 1949 (Saturday) ==
Flag of China

- Zhou Enlai became the 1st Premier of the People's Republic of China.
- The new flag of China was officially unveiled in Beijing's Tiananmen Square.
- A nationwide steel strike began in the United States at 12:01 a.m. EST after last-minute negotiations failed.
- "That Lucky Old Sun" by Frankie Laine topped the Billboard singles chart.
- Born: Isaac Bonewits, Druid and author, in Royal Oak, Michigan (d. 2010)
- Died: Nykyta Budka, 72, Ukrainian Roman Catholic bishop (died in the Gulag); Buddy Clark, 37, American singer (plane crash)

== October 2, 1949 (Sunday) ==
- The Soviet Union announced diplomatic recognition of the People's Republic of China and termination of diplomatic relations with the Nationalist Chinese government.
- On the last day of major league baseball's regular season, the New York Yankees and Brooklyn Dodgers captured the pennants of their respective leagues, each by one game.
- Born: Richard Hell, punk rock musician, as Richard Meyers in Lexington, Kentucky; Annie Leibovitz, photographer, in Waterbury, Connecticut

== October 3, 1949 (Monday) ==
- WERD, the first radio station owned and operated by African-Americans, was established in Atlanta, Georgia.
- In conjunction with the next day's opening of a comic strip exhibition, fourteen comic strip artists including Ham Fisher, Milton Caniff, Alex Raymond and Rube Goldberg sketched US President Harry S. Truman as he stood on the terrace of the White House Rose Garden.
- Born: Lindsey Buckingham, musician best known as lead guitarist and co-vocalist of Fleetwood Mac, in Palo Alto, California
- Died: Midhat Frashëri, 69, Albanian diplomat, writer and politician

== October 4, 1949 (Tuesday) ==
- In Washington, D.C. the Library of Congress, in connection with a US Savings Bond campaign, opened a touring exhibition tracing the history of techniques in comic strips from prehistoric cave painting to the present day.
- Born: Armand Assante, actor, in New York City
- Died: Federico Beltrán Masses, 64, Cuban-born Spanish painter

== October 5, 1949 (Wednesday) ==
- The flag of the United Nations was hoisted from the United Nations Headquarters to mark the completion of the steel work on the structure.
- Yugoslavia extended diplomatic recognition to the People's Republic of China.
- The Puget Sound fishermen's strike of 1949 began in the Pacific Northwest.
- The Walt Disney animated package film The Adventures of Ichabod and Mr. Toad was released.
- Died: Yoshio Kodaira, 44, Japanese serial killer (executed by hanging)

== October 6, 1949 (Thursday) ==
- Kim Il Sung's North Korea established a diplomatic relationship with the newly proclaimed People's Republic of China by Chairman Mao after the Chinese Civil War, following the Liberation of Beijing, both countries had close ties between Pyongyang and Beijing.
- President Truman signed the Mutual Defense Assistance Act, the first US military foreign aid legislation of the Cold War era.
- "Tokyo Rose" Iva Toguri D'Aquino was sentenced to ten years in prison and fined $10,000 for broadcasting Japanese propaganda to American troops during World War II.
- Communist authorities in Shanghai banned news dispatches by reporters from countries which did not recognize the PRC.
- Henri Queuille resigned as Prime Minister of France.
- The drama film The Heiress starring Olivia de Havilland, Montgomery Clift and Ralph Richardson premiered in New York.
- Born: Bobby Farrell, dancer and member of the pop and disco group Boney M., in San Nicolaas, Aruba (d. 2010)

== October 7, 1949 (Friday) ==
October 7: The German Democratic Republic is established.

- The German Democratic Republic, commonly referred to as East Germany, began to function as a state when its constitution was promulgated.

== October 8, 1949 (Saturday) ==
- The West Berlin City Assembly called on the western powers to incorporate West Berlin into West Germany.
- Born: Sigourney Weaver, actress, in Manhattan, New York
- Died: Gheorghe Mironescu, 75, 33rd Prime Minister of Romania

== October 9, 1949 (Sunday) ==
- Elections to the Austrian National Council were held, won by the Austrian People's Party.
- The New York Yankees defeated the Brooklyn Dodgers 10–6 to win the World Series, four games to one.
- Died: Emanuele Foà, 57, Italian engineer and engineering physicist

== October 10, 1949 (Monday) ==
- Pilots Woody Jongeward and Bob Woodhouse landed their Aeronca in Yuma, Arizona after setting a new flight endurance record of 1,124 hours and 14 minutes.
- The 3rd National Hockey League All-Star Game was played at Maple Leaf Gardens in Toronto. A team of NHL all-stars defeated the Toronto Maple Leafs 3–1.
- Norway held an election to the Storting. The Labour Party won 85 out of 150 seats.
- Born: Jessica Harper, actress, producer and singer, in Chicago, Illinois
- Died: Chikuhei Nakajima, 65, Japanese naval officer, engineer and politician

== October 11, 1949 (Tuesday) ==
- Wilhelm Pieck became 1st State President of East Germany.
- At the United Nations, Soviet diplomat Yakov Malik proposed that each of the 39 member countries release a full account of atomic bombs and other weapons they possessed. American delegate Warren Austin dismissed the idea as meaningless if there were no means of verification.

== October 12, 1949 (Wednesday) ==
- Otto Grotewohl became 1st Prime Minister of East Germany.
- Control of the famous Waldorf-Astoria Hotel in New York City was sold to the Hilton Hotel chain for $3 million.
- The musical comedy film Love Happy premiered in San Francisco, marking the last feature film starring the Marx Brothers.
- Born:
  - Randy Kryn, Civil Rights Movement historian, as Randall Lee Kryn
  - Carlos the Jackal, terrorist, as Ilich Ramírez Sánchez in Michelena, Venezuela

== October 13, 1949 (Thursday) ==
- Indian Prime Minister Jawaharlal Nehru addressed both houses of US Congress with a speech assuring Americans that his country would not stay neutral "where freedom is menaced, or justice threatened," but stopped short of pledging military assistance.
- The French National Assembly approved Socialist Jules Moch as the next prime minister of France by just one vote over the minimum required. 311 votes were cast in Moch's favour with 223 against; he needed 310.
- Died: Michael J. O'Doherty, 75, Roman Catholic Archbishop of Manila

== October 14, 1949 (Friday) ==
- The Smith Act trial of Communist Party leaders ended after nine months with all eleven defendants found guilty of criminal conspiracy.
- In Guatemala, more than 300 people were killed by two days of storms and flooding.
- Born: Katha Pollitt, poet, essayist and critic, in Brooklyn, New York
- Died: Roman Lysko, 35, Ukrainian Greek Catholic priest (died of starvation in prison)

== October 15, 1949 (Saturday) ==
- Communist troops were reported to be in full control of Guangzhou.
- President Truman nominated nineteen new federal judges, including Virgin Islands Governor William H. Hastie, the first African-American to be named to the Federal Circuit Court of Appeals.
- Died: Elmer Clifton, 59, American writer, film director and actor; Fritz Leiber, 67, American actor; László Rajk, 40, Hungarian Communist politician (executed)

== October 16, 1949 (Sunday) ==
- The Greek Civil War ended after three-and-a-half years when the communist rebels surrendered.
- A 168-day walkout by 7,500 workers at the Singer Manufacturing Company plant in Elizabeth, New Jersey ended in failure. The strike was one of the longest and costliest in New Jersey's history.

== October 17, 1949 (Monday) ==
- East Germany and the Soviet Union established diplomatic relations.
- Jules Moch abandoned his attempt to form a government, leaving French President Vincent Auriol to find another candidate for Prime Minister.
- The science fiction novel Red Planet by Robert A. Heinlein was published.
- The Harold Robbins novel The Dream Merchants was published.
- Born:
  - Owen Arthur, 5th Prime Minister of Barbados, in Barbados (d. 2020)
  - Bill Hudson, musician and actor, in Portland, Oregon
  - Dean Shek, Chinese actor and producer of Hong Kong feature films, in Beijing (d. 2021)

== October 18, 1949 (Tuesday) ==
- Communist Chinese forces captured the port city of Xiamen.
- Exiled King Leopold III of Belgium agreed to a referendum on his return to Belgium, promising to remain in Switzerland if he received less than 55% support.

== October 19, 1949 (Wednesday) ==
- Torrential rains and flooding in Guatemala left 4,000 dead and did $40 million US worth of damage.
- The United States completed its Japanese war crimes trials.

== October 20, 1949 (Thursday) ==
- The French Assembly endorsed René Mayer as Prime Minister of France.
- The Canadian Seamen's Union called off its six-and-a-half-month-old strike against Canadian East Coast shipowners.
- China Life founded, as predecessor name was People's Insurance Company of China.
- Born: Valeriy Borzov, sprint athlete, in Sambir, Ukrainian SSR, Soviet Union
- Died: Jacques Copeau, 70, French theatre director, producer, actor and dramatist

== October 21, 1949 (Friday) ==
- Sentencing was handed down in the Smith Act trial of Communist Party leaders, with ten of the eleven defendants getting five years in prison. The eleventh, Robert G. Thompson, got only three years because of his distinguished war record. All were additionally fined $10,000.
- German Field Marshal Erich von Manstein testified in his own defense for two-and-a-half hours at his war crimes trial in Hamburg, saying that Hitler "lacked in many respects the qualities to make him a good commander" and describing the Nazi persecution of the Jews and other groups as "very repulsive."
- West German Chancellor Konrad Adenauer claimed that the German Democratic Republic was illegal and that West Germany had "responsibility" for all Germans.
- Born: Benjamin Netanyahu, 9th Prime Minister of Israel, in Tel Aviv, Israel; LaTanya Richardson, actress and producer, in Atlanta, Georgia
- Died: Laura of Saint Catherine of Siena, 75, Colombian Roman Catholic nun

== October 22, 1949 (Saturday) ==
- Nowy Dwór Mazowiecki train disaster: in Poland, an express train bound for Warsaw from Gdańsk derailed, killing 200.
- 20 people were killed and another 40 injured in Cali, Colombia when a mob stormed a Liberal Party meeting.
- West German Chancellor Konrad Adenauer refused to recognize East Germany.
- Born: Stiv Bators, lead singer of punk rock band The Dead Boys, as Steven Bator in Youngstown, Ohio (d. 1990); Butch Goring, ice hockey player and coach, in Saint Boniface, Winnipeg, Canada; Arsène Wenger, footballer and manager, in Strasbourg, France
- Died: Craig Reynolds, 42, American actor

== October 23, 1949 (Sunday) ==
- Georges Bidault agreed to try to form the next French government after René Mayer also failed.
- Born: Würzel, guitarist of the rock band Motörhead, as Michael Burston in Cheltenham, England (d. 2011)
- Died: J. R. Clynes, 80, British trade unionist and politician; Almanzo Wilder, 92, husband of American writer Laura Ingalls Wilder and father of Rose Wilder Lane

== October 24, 1949 (Monday) ==
- On United Nations Day, the cornerstone was ceremonially laid for the permanent headquarters of the United Nations in New York City. Secretary-General Trygve Lie placed copies of the Charter, the Universal Declaration of Human Rights and a program of the dedication ceremony into a metal box that was placed under the cornerstone.
- A 44-day strike of operating employees of Missouri Pacific lines ended after an agreement was reached to arbitrate unsettled union grievances.
- Two days of parliamentary elections concluded in Iceland. The Independence Party remained the largest in the Lower House of the Althing, winning 13 of 35 seats.
- The Churchill-Roosevelt Highway was turned over to the Government of Trinidad and Tobago

== October 25, 1949 (Tuesday) ==
- The Battle of Guningtou began in the Chinese Civil War.
- A British de Havilland Comet piloted by John Cunningham flew 2,980 miles from London to Tripoli and back in a record time of 6 hours 38 minutes.
- In further testimony at his war crimes trial, Erich von Manstein said he could have held the Soviets to a stalemate on the Eastern Front if Hitler had not interfered with his plan.
- The Puget Sound fishermen's strike of 1949 began to wind down after three weeks as some of the biggest packers agreed to give the strikers a wage increase.

== October 26, 1949 (Wednesday) ==
- President Truman signed the Fair Labor Standards Amendment of 1949 which raised the minimum wage from 40 to 75 cents per hour.
- Born: Antonio Carpio, Chief Justice of the Supreme Court of the Philippines, in Davao City, Philippines; Kevin Sullivan, professional wrestler, in Cambridge, Massachusetts (d. 2024)
- Died: Lionel Halsey, 77, Royal Navy officer and courtier

== October 27, 1949 (Thursday) ==
- The Battle of Guningtou ended with the Communists failing to take Taiwan.
- A cyclone in southeast India drowned at least 1,000 people and left another 50,000 homeless.
- Died: František Halas, 48, Czech poet

== October 28, 1949 (Friday) ==
- 1949 Air France Lockheed Constellation crash: A Lockheed 749 Constellation of Air France crashed into a mountain on São Miguel Island in the Azores while trying to land at Santa Maria Airport. All 48 aboard were killed.
- Georges Bidault became Prime Minister of France.
- Eugenie Anderson became the first female ambassador in US history when she was sworn in as the envoy to Denmark.
- Born: Caitlyn Jenner, Olympic gold medalist decathlete and television personality, as Bruce Jenner in Mount Kisco, New York
- Died: Guregh Israelian of Jerusalem, 55, Armenian Patriarch of Jerusalem
  - killed in the Air France Lockheed Constellation crash:
    - Bernard Boutet de Monvel, 68, French sculptor
    - Marcel Cerdan, 33, French middleweight boxing champion
    - Kay Kamen, 57, American merchandising executive with the Walt Disney Company
    - Ginette Neveu, 30, French classical violinist

== October 29, 1949 (Saturday) ==
- In Edinburgh, James Graham, 6th Duke of Montrose put the first signature on a national covenant demanding self-rule for Scotland while remaining under the British crown. Another 600 delegates lined up behind him to also sign the document, with the goal of collecting 1 million signatures.
- Born:
  - Abdullah Gül, President of Turkey 2007 to 2014; in Kayseri
  - Paul Orndorff, professional wrestler, in Brandon, Florida (d. 2021)
- Died: George Gurdjieff, Armenian-born mystic and philosopher

== October 30, 1949 (Sunday) ==
- Communist authorities ended price subsidies on rationed goods in East Germany.
- The Egyptian by Mika Waltari topped The New York Times Fiction Best Seller list for the first of sixteen consecutive weeks.
- Born: Pramod Mahajan, politician, in Mahbubnagar, India (d. 2006)

== October 31, 1949 (Monday) ==
- The month-old Bethlehem Steel strike ended with an agreement to provide the 80,000 workers with a non-contributory pension plan and a contributory insurance program.
- The Guangxi Campaign began in the Chinese Civil War.
- Died: Jindřich Bišický, 60, Czech World War I photographer; Lorenzo Massa, 66, Argentine Catholic priest; Edward Stettinius Jr., 49, American businessman and 49th US Secretary of State
