= August 1949 =

Month of 1949

<<	August 1949					>>
Su	Mo	Tu	We	Th	Fr	Sa
	1	2	3	4	5	6
7	8	9	10	11	12	13
14	15	16	17	18	19	20
21	22	23	24	25	26	27
28	29	30	31

The following events occurred in August 1949:

== August 1, 1949 (Monday) ==
- Massachusetts Governor Paul A. Dever signed a bill banning Communists from holding state jobs and requiring all future applicants to take loyalty oaths.
- Born:
  - Jim Carroll, author, poet and musician, in Manhattan, New York (d. 2009)
  - Gulbuddin Hekmatyar, Afghan politician and warlord, in Kunduz
  - Mugur Isărescu, Prime Minister of Romania, in Drăgășani, Romania

== August 2, 1949 (Tuesday) ==
- Britain, France and the United States issued separate statements rejecting the USSR's charge of July 19 that the North Atlantic Treaty was a violation of the Italian peace treaty. US Secretary of State Dean Acheson said that "Italy is left quite free by the provisions of the peace treaty to join with other states in a collective defense arrangement."

== August 3, 1949 (Wednesday) ==
- In the Indonesian conflict, formal ceasefire orders were issued to both Dutch and Indonesian forces, effective at midnight August 10 in Java and midnight August 14 in Sumatra.
- The Dutch Upper House ratified the North Atlantic Treaty by a vote of 29 to 2.
- The Basketball Association of America merged with the National Basketball League to create the National Basketball Association (NBA).
- One-time pretender to the Spanish throne Don Jaime de Bourbon Battenberg married opera singer Charlotte Tiedemann in Innsbruck, Austria.
- Born: Valeri Vasiliev, ice hockey player, in Gorky, USSR (d. 2012)

== August 4, 1949 (Thursday) ==
- Italy and Yugoslavia signed a one-year trade agreement worth about 54 billion lire.
- Born: John Riggins, NFL running back, in Seneca, Kansas
- Died: Liberato Pinto, 68, 79th Prime Minister of Portugal

== August 5, 1949 (Friday) ==
- The Ambato earthquake killed 5,050 people in Ecuador.
- Menarsha synagogue attack: A grenade attack on a synagogue in the Jewish quarter of Damascus, Syria claimed 12 lives.
- Swedish actress Ingrid Bergman announced through her publicist that she was seeking a divorce from her husband Petter Lindström and planned to retire from the screen after her present film was finished. Bergman's press statement made no mention of rumors that she was having an affair with Italian director Roberto Rossellini.
- Mann Gulch Fire burned over and ultimately killed 13 USDA Forest Service wildland firefighters, including 12 of the 15 smokejumpers dropped on it.
- Died: Ernest Fourneau, 76, French medicinal chemist

== August 6, 1949 (Saturday) ==
- Major General Maxwell D. Taylor was named to succeed the outgoing Frank L. Howley as commandant of the American sector of Berlin.

== August 7, 1949 (Sunday) ==
- Siege of Surakarta: Indonesian Republic forces briefly infiltrated the city of Surakarta. Though repulsed by the Dutch, the attack provided a morale boost for the Indonesians.
- Darul Islam was proclaimed in Indonesia.
- A British Gloster Meteor set a new endurance record for jet aircraft in a 3,600-mile (5,800 km) flight over England that lasted 12 hours and 3 minutes.
- Born:
  - Alan Campbell, Northern Irish pastor, in Belfast, Northern Ireland (d. 2017)
  - Walid Jumblatt, Lebanese politician, in Moukhtara, Lebanon

== August 8, 1949 (Monday) ==
- Greece, Turkey and Iceland were approved for admission to the Council of Europe.
- Bhutan and India signed the Treaty of Friendship, calling for peace between the two nations and non-interference in each other's internal affairs.
- Born: Keith Carradine, actor, singer and songwriter, in San Mateo, California

== August 9, 1949 (Tuesday) ==
- The Lanzhou Campaign began.
- Actor Jimmy Stewart married Gloria Hatrick McLean in a Presbyterian church in Hollywood.
- Born: Ted Simmons, baseball player, in Highland Park, Michigan
- Died: Harry Davenport, 83, American actor; G. E. M. Skues, 90, British lawyer, author and inventor of nymph fly fishing; Edward Thorndike, 74, American psychologist

== August 10, 1949 (Wednesday) ==
- US President Harry S. Truman signed an amendment to the National Security Act of 1947, reorganizing the armed forces and renaming the National Military Establishment the Department of Defense.
- Died: Homer Burton Adkins, 57, American chemist; John George Haigh, 40, English serial killer (executed by hanging)

== August 11, 1949 (Thursday) ==
- The Third Geneva Convention received final approval at a conference of 60 nations, adopting almost unanimously three revised agreements regulating the treatment of wounded combatants, prisoners of war and civilians in occupied territory.
- The Australian coal strike broke up when the central executive of the Miners Federation in Sydney authorized the 23,000 strikers to go back to work on Monday.
- Born: Eric Carmen, singer and songwriter, in Cleveland, Ohio; Ian Charleson, actor, in Edinburgh, Scotland (d. 1990)

== August 12, 1949 (Friday) ==
- The Fourth Geneva Convention was adopted, which included humanitarian protections for civilians in a war zone.
- Moscow radio read a bulletin describing Yugoslavia as an "enemy of the Soviet Union" and charging the Tito government of "merging itself to an even greater extent with imperialist circles against the Soviet Union and entering into blocs with them."
- The Constituent Assembly of India adopted a measure conferring citizenship on Indians living abroad if they, their parents or grandparents were born in India. About 3 million people living abroad were made eligible for Indian citizenship under the new rules.
- Big Ben was slowed down by 4½ minutes when a flock of starlings perched on its minute hand.
- Born: Fernando Collor de Mello, 32nd President of Brazil, in Rio de Janeiro, Brazil; Mark Essex, mass murderer, in Emporia, Kansas (d. 1973); Mark Knopfler, guitarist and lead singer of the rock band Dire Straits, in Glasgow, Scotland
- Died: Al Shean, 81, German-born comedian and vaudeville performer

== August 13, 1949 (Saturday) ==
- A Douglas C-47 Skytrain crashed in the Andes en route from Bogotá to Ibagué, killing all 32 aboard.
- Born: Bobby Clarke, ice hockey player and executive, in Flin Flon, Manitoba, Canada

== August 14, 1949 (Sunday) ==
- Federal elections were held in West Germany. The Social Democratic Party won a plurality of seats in the Bundestag.
- The 2nd World Festival of Youth and Students opened at Újpest Stadium in Budapest.
- Born: Bob Backlund, professional wrestler, in Princeton, Minnesota; Ivan Boldirev, ice hockey player, in Zrenjanin, Yugoslavia; Morten Olsen, footballer and manager, in Vordingborg, Denmark
- Died: Muhsin al-Barazi, 44 or 45, 24th Prime Minister of Syria (executed); Husni al-Za'im, 52, President of Syria (executed)

== August 15, 1949 (Monday) ==
- A Douglas DC-3 of Transocean Air Lines en route from Rome to Shannon, Ireland got lost, ran out of fuel and crashed in the Atlantic Ocean fifteen miles off the Irish coast. 49 of the 58 aboard were rescued from life rafts, but 9 perished.
- Maurice Feltin was made Archbishop of Paris.
- Born:
  - Beverly Burns, pilot and first woman to captain the Boeing 747 jumbo jet, in Baltimore, Maryland (d. 2025)
  - Phyllis Smith, American actress known for The Office, Inside Out and The OA

== August 16, 1949 (Tuesday) ==
- The Vatican clarified a point of confusion among Roman Catholics by issuing a declaration that permitted marriages between Communists and Catholics, but only by treating them as "mixed" marriages between Catholics and non-Catholics. Participants would be required to sign a written declaration that all their children would be baptized and brought up Catholic, and Mass was not to celebrated.
- Born: Barbara Goodson, voice actress, in Brooklyn, New York
- Died: Ramón Briones Luco, 76, Chilean lawyer and politician; Margaret Mitchell, 48, American author (Gone with the Wind); Otto Steinbrinck, 60, German U-boat commander and industrialist; Tom Wintringham, 51, British soldier, military historian, author and Marxist politician

== August 17, 1949 (Wednesday) ==
- The Karlıova earthquake in eastern Turkey caused 320 casualties.
- Matsukawa derailment: A Tōhoku Main Line passenger train derailed and overturned, killing 3 people in an apparent case of sabotage.
- The body of Theodor Herzl, the founder of modern Zionism, was reinterred at the newly named Mount Herzl in Jerusalem. Herzl, who died in 1904, had been buried in Vienna but specified in his will that he wished for his body, and those of his immediate relatives, to be transferred to the Jewish state he hoped would someday be a reality.
- Hashim al-Atassi became Prime Minister of Syria.
- Born: Sue Draheim, fiddler, in Oakland, California (d. 2013)
- Died: Gregorio Perfecto, 57, Filipino journalist and jurist

== August 18, 1949 (Thursday) ==
- The Soviet Union sent Yugoslavia a note threatening to "resort to other more effective measures" unless the Tito government ceased the alleged mistreatment of Soviet citizens in Yugoslavia.
- The US Senate confirmed Attorney General Tom C. Clark as an Associate Justice of the Supreme Court by a vote of 73 to 8.
- Kemi Bloody Thursday: two protesters die in the scuffle between the police and the strikers' protest procession in Kemi, Finland.
- Died: Paul Mares, 49, American jazz cornet and trumpet player

== August 19, 1949 (Friday) ==
- Manchester BEA Douglas DC-3 accident: A Douglas DC-3 of British European Airways crashed on Saddleworth Moor in the South Pennines in Northern England, killing 24 of the 32 aboard.
- Peru broke off diplomatic relations with Cuba, charging that anti-government leaders sought by the police had been granted asylum by the Cuban embassy in Lima.
- Exorcism of Roland Doe: The Maryland newspaper The Catholic Review published a story claiming that a priest had performed a successful exorcism on a 14-year old Mount Rainier boy earlier that year. Subsequent supernatural claims surrounding the events inspired elements of the 1971 William Peter Blatty novel The Exorcist and the 1973 film adaptation of the same name.
- The screwball comedy film I Was a Male War Bride starring Cary Grant and Ann Sheridan was released.

== August 20, 1949 (Saturday) ==
- The Hungarian Constitution of 1949 was adopted and the Hungarian People's Republic proclaimed.
- Born: Phil Lynott, bassist, singer and songwriter (Thin Lizzy), in West Bromwich, Staffordshire, England (d. 1986)

== August 21, 1949 (Sunday) ==
- It was unofficially reported from the Vatican that the bones of Saint Peter had been discovered beneath St. Peter's Basilica, which, if verified, would confirm the longstanding tradition which held that the early Christian leader had been buried there.
- Born: Loretta Devine, actress and singer, in Houston, Texas; Daniel Sivan, professor of the Hebrew language, in Casablanca, Morocco

== August 22, 1949 (Monday) ==
- The Queen Charlotte Islands earthquake struck the sparsely populated Queen Charlotte Islands and the Pacific Northwest Coast.
- The horror comedy film Abbott and Costello Meet the Killer, Boris Karloff starring Abbott and Costello and Boris Karloff was released.
- Died: Amado Aguirre Santiago, 86, Mexican general and politician

== August 23, 1949 (Tuesday) ==
- The Dutch–Indonesian Round Table Conference opened in The Hague.
- Yugoslavia accused the USSR of attempting to interfere in its internal affairs but offered to repatriate 31 Russians being held on espionage charges.
- The trial of Erich von Manstein began in Hamburg.
- Ku Klux Klan representatives from six Southern states met in Montgomery, Alabama to unite into a nationwide organization claiming a membership of 265,000.
- Born: Shelley Long, actress, in Fort Wayne, Indiana; Rick Springfield, musician and actor, in Guildford, New South Wales, Australia; Leslie Van Houten, convicted murderer and member of the Manson Family, in Altadena, California

== August 24, 1949 (Wednesday) ==
- President Truman declared the North Atlantic Treaty to be in effect following deposit by France of the last required instrument of ratification.
- Born: Bantz J. Craddock, United States Army general, in Parkersburg, West Virginia; Anna Lee Fisher, chemist, physician and astronaut, in New York City; Stephen Paulus, composer, in Summit, New Jersey (d. 2014); Jerry Zucker, businessman and philanthropist, in Tel Aviv, Israel (d. 2008)

== August 25, 1949 (Thursday) ==
- Judge Harold Medina refused to declare a mistrial in the Smith Act trial despite defense contentions that juror Russell Janney, author of The Miracle of the Bells, discussed the case out-of-court and had answered falsely about having an anti-Communist bias during the jury selection process.
- RCA reported the development of a color television which could be adapted to existing black-and-white receivers through the use of a converter.
- Born: Martin Amis, novelist, in Oxford, England (d. 2023); Gene Simmons, musician, entrepreneur and founding member of the rock band Kiss, as Chaim Witz in Tirat Carmel, Haifa, Israel
- Died: Will Henry Stevens, 67, American painter and naturalist

== August 26, 1949 (Friday) ==
- The Federal Circuit Court of Appeals in San Francisco upheld the restoration of American citizenship to three Japanese-American women who had renounced it while being held in internment camps during the war but, according to them, did not do so of their own free will. The court characterized conditions in the camps as "unnessarily cruel and inhuman treatment."
- The US submarine Cochino sustained an explosion in its battery room and sank during training maneuvers north of Hammerfest, Norway. One crew member perished, and six aboard a sister vessel were swept overboard and drowned during rescue operations in heavy seas.
- Born: Leon Redbone, singer-songwriter, on Cyprus (d. 2019)

== August 27, 1949 (Saturday) ==
- The Lanzhou Campaign ended in Communist victory with the capture of the city of Lanzhou.
- The first of the two Peekskill riots took place when a free-for-all fight involving several hundred people resulted in the postponement of an open-air concert by Paul Robeson on the outskirts of Peekskill, New York.
- Died: Abdulkerim Abbas, 27 or 28, Chinese Uyghur leader (plane crash); Dalelkhan Sugirbayev, 43, Chinese Kazakh leader (plane crash)

== August 28, 1949 (Sunday) ==
- The Greek Army captured Mount Gramos from the Communists.
- Born: Martin Lamble, drummer of the folk rock band Fairport Convention, in St John's Wood, London, England (d. 1969); Svetislav Pešić, basketball coach, in Novi Sad, Yugoslavia; Charles Rocket, actor, as Charles Claverie in Bangor, Maine (d. 2005)

== August 29, 1949 (Monday) ==
- The Soviet Union conducted its first nuclear weapons test, exploding the RDS-1 at the Semipalatinsk Test Site in the northeast of the Kazakh SSR.
- American engineer Abe Silverstein was appointed as chief of research at the National Advisory Committee for Aeronautics' Lewis Flight Propulsion Laboratory in Cleveland, Ohio (now the Glenn Research Center).
- Born: Stan Hansen, professional wrestler, in Knox City, Texas
- Died: Franciszek Latinik, 85, Polish general

== August 30, 1949 (Tuesday) ==
- Apartheid was officially introduced to South African post offices when counters in two Cape Town offices were segregated into white and non-white sections, with more to follow soon.
- Born: Peter Maffay, musician, in Brașov, Romania
- Died: Arthur Fielder, 72, English cricketer; Sevasti Qiriazi, 77 or 78, Albanian pioneer of female education

== August 31, 1949 (Wednesday) ==
- Italy and Greece signed a treaty of economic collaboration in which Italy agreed to pay Greece $101 million US in war reparations and compel Italian nationals in the Dodecanese Islands to sell off their properties there within a year's time.
- At the 83rd and last encampment of the Grand Army of the Republic in Indianapolis, thousands watched as six of the last sixteen surviving veterans of the Union Army in the American Civil War traveled a metaphorical last mile over a parade route via automobile, then held their final "Campfire" at the Indiana Roof Ballroom.
- Born: Richard Gere, actor and activist, in Philadelphia, Pennsylvania; Hugh David Politzer, theoretical physicist and Nobel laureate, in New York City
