= December 1949 =

Month of 1949

<<	December 1949					>>
Su	Mo	Tu	We	Th	Fr	Sa
				1	2	3
4	5	6	7	8	9	10
11	12	13	14	15	16	17
18	19	20	21	22	23	24
25	26	27	28	29	30	31

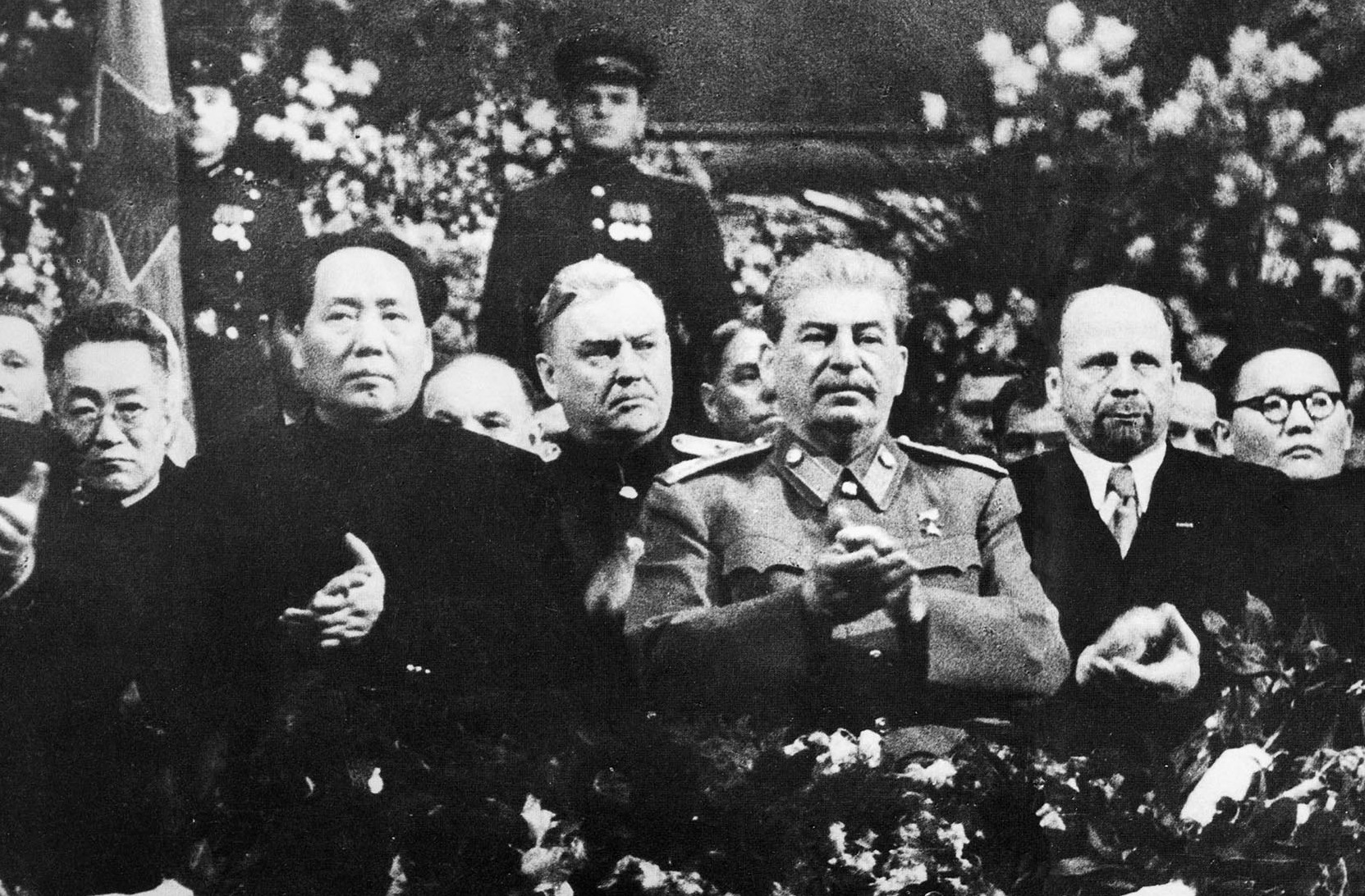
December 21: Joseph Stalin's 70th Birthday Celebration.

The following events occurred in December 1949:

== December 1, 1949 (Thursday) ==
- The UN General Assembly adopted by a vote of 53 to 5 a resolution to observe the UN charter and their treaties faithfully as the best guarantee of peace. All five dissenting votes came from the Eastern Bloc.
- Born: Pablo Escobar, drug lord, in Rionegro, Colombia (d. 1993); Sebastián Piñera, President of Chile, in Santiago, Chile (d. 2024); Kurt Schmoke, politician and lawyer, in Baltimore, Maryland

== December 2, 1949 (Friday) ==
- A note from the US State Department was delivered to the Chinese Nationalist government protesting the shelling of the merchant ship Sir John Franklin in the Yangtze River approaches on November 28, denouncing the action as "unjustifiable". The note concluded: "The government of the United States is constrained to point out to the Chinese Nationalist government the seriousness with which it views this attack upon American life and property. It is therefore requested that the Chinese Nationalist government immediately issue such orders as will preclude the possibility of any future incident of this nature."
- The University of Sarajevo was established.
- Died: Eugene Neeley, 53, American football player

== December 3, 1949 (Saturday) ==
- A Congressional investigation was ordered into allegations that the late Harry Hopkins, a close advisor of President Roosevelt, had helped the Soviets get atomic secrets and materials out of the United States during World War II.
- Born: John Akii-Bua, Olympic hurdler, in Abako, Uganda (d. 1997); Heather Menzies, model and actress, in Toronto, Canada (d. 2017)
- Died: Philip Barry, 53, American dramatist; Maria Ouspenskaya, 73, Russian actress

== December 4, 1949 (Sunday) ==
- Czechoslovakia's Roman Catholic bishops warned the Communist government that they could not submit to church control laws which eliminated religious freedom in the country.
- KPHO-TV signed on the air in Phoenix as the first television station in Arizona.
- Born: Jeff Bridges, actor, in Los Angeles, California; Pamela Stephenson, actress, comedian and psychologist, in Takapuna, Auckland, New Zealand

== December 5, 1949 (Monday) ==
- Israeli Prime Minister David Ben-Gurion told the Knesset that Israel would not give up its control of Jerusalem. After his statement the body unanimously voted in support of this policy.
- Composer Arturo Toscanini was made a lifetime senator of the Italian Republic for his contributions to music.
- Actress Shirley Temple divorced actor John Agar, accusing him of excessive drinking and having affairs with other women.
- Died: Arthur Bedford, 67 or 68, Royal Navy officer

== December 6, 1949 (Tuesday) ==
- The Chinese Nationalist government rejected the US protest against the shelling of American merchant vessels and warned that blockade runners must suffer the consequences if they tried to evade Nationalist warships.
- Died: Lead Belly, 61, American folk and blues musician

== December 7, 1949 (Wednesday) ==
- Manhattan Project director Leslie Groves told the House Un-American Activities Committee that within a month of taking charge of the atomic program, he learned that Russian spies were active in atomic laboratories in the United States. Groves testified that he knew of only one batch of atomic materials that were bought by the Russians and shipped out of the country, but that he did not know "how many more leaked through."
- An Arrow Air Douglas DC-3 crashes near Benica, California due to undetermined reasons, killing all nine aboard.
- Born: Tom Waits, singer-songwriter, composer and actor, in Pomona, California; Cathy Wayne, entertainer, in Arncliffe, New South Wales, Australia (d. 1969)
- Died: Rex Beach, 72, American novelist, playwright and Olympic water polo silver medalist

== December 8, 1949 (Thursday) ==
- The Chinese Nationalist government moved its capital from Chengdu in western China to Taipei, Taiwan.
- The United Nations Relief and Works Agency for Palestine Refugees in the Near East UNRWA was formed.
- The musical film On the Town starring Gene Kelly, Frank Sinatra, Betty Garrett, Ann Miller and Vera-Ellen was released.
- Born: Mary Gordon, writer, in Far Rockaway, Queens, New York

== December 9, 1949 (Friday) ==
- The National Football League and the All-America Football Conference agreed to merge into a single league.
- East Germany banned the Christmas holiday.

== December 10, 1949 (Saturday) ==
- The 1949 Nobel Prizes were presented in Stockholm. The recipients were Hideki Yukawa of Japan for Physics, William Giauque (United States) for Chemistry, Walter Rudolf Hess (Switzerland) and António Egas Moniz (Portugal) for Physiology or Medicine and William Faulkner for Literature. In Oslo, Baron Boyd-Orr of the United Kingdom was awarded the Peace Prize.
- Federal elections were held in Australia. The incumbent Labor Party of Prime Minister Ben Chifley was defeated by the opposition Liberal Party led by Robert Menzies.
- Died: Duncan Stewart, 45, British diplomat and 2nd Governor of Sarawak (assassinated)

== December 11, 1949 (Sunday) ==
- The event commonly referred to as the Číhošť miracle occurred in the Church of the Assumption of the Virgin Mary in the village of Číhošť, Czechoslovakia, when churchgoers reported seeing an iron cross on the main altar move several times on its own.
- The embalmed body of Bulgarian Communist leader Georgi Dimitrov, who died July 2, was placed on view in a white stone mausoleum in Sofia.

== December 12, 1949 (Monday) ==
- A Douglas DC-3 operated by Pakair crashed into a mountain at and burst into flame 30 miles north of Karachi Airport in Pakistan. All 26 aboard were killed.
- Born: Bill Nighy, British actor, in Caterham, Surrey

== December 13, 1949 (Tuesday) ==
- The Israeli government moved from Tel Aviv to Jerusalem, although Prime Minister David Ben-Gurion avoided proclaiming Jerusalem the "capital".
- Saint Lucy's Day celebrations in Sweden turned tragic when three festival queens in Norrköping were killed by a train that struck their festival chariot.
- The White House Reconstruction began without fanfare. Over the next three years the historic structure would be gutted, expanded and rebuilt while President Harry S. Truman and his family lived in Blair House across the street.
- Born: Robert Lindsay, English actor, in Ilkeston, England; Randy Owen, lead singer of country music band Alabama, in Fort Payne, Alabama; Tom Verlaine, singer, songwriter and guitarist (Television), in Denville, New Jersey (d. 2023)

== December 14, 1949 (Wednesday) ==
- The Indonesian Parliament ratified the Dutch-Indonesian agreement to establish a sovereign United States of Indonesia by a vote of 226 to 62.
- Former vice-prime minister of Bulgaria Traicho Kostov was found guilty of all treason charges against him and sentenced to death.
- The Guangxi Campaign ended.
- In an interview with The New York Times in Rome, actress Ingrid Bergman and director Roberto Rossellini confirmed reports that they planned to marry as soon as Bergman's divorce from her first husband was finalized. When asked about rumors that Bergman was pregnant, Rossellini replied, "Whether she is or not is nobody's affair."
- The war film Sands of Iwo Jima starring John Wayne premiered in San Francisco.
- Born: Bill Buckner, baseball player, in Vallejo, California (d. 2019); Cliff Williams, bassist of the rock band AC/DC, in Romford, England

== December 15, 1949 (Thursday) ==
- West Germany became the direct recipient of Marshall Plan aid under an agreement signed by Chancellor Konrad Adenauer and US High Commissioner John J. McCloy.
- Moro rebels in the Sulu province of the Philippines ambushed a crack constabulary combat unit, killing 71 officers and men.
- The Birdland jazz club opened in New York City.
- Born: Don Johnson, actor, filmmaker and musician, in Flat Creek, Missouri; Abdul Karim Al-Kabariti, Prime Minister of Jordan, in Amman, Jordan

== December 16, 1949 (Friday) ==
- Mao Zedong arrived in Moscow to confer with Joseph Stalin.
- Sukarno was elected first 1st president of the United States of Indonesia by electors from all sixteen states of the East Indian islands.
- The Parliament Act 1949 received Royal Assent in the United Kingdom.
- The Voortrekker Monument outside Pretoria in South Africa was inaugurated.
- An auto parts product and sales brand, Denso was founded in Kariya, Aichi Prefecture, Japan, under the predecessor's name of Nippon Denso.
- Born: Billy Gibbons, lead vocalist and guitarist of the rock band ZZ Top, in Houston, Texas
- Died: Traicho Kostov, 52, Bulgarian politician (executed by Communist authorities for treason); Sidney Olcott, 76, Canadian-born filmmaker; Lee White, 61, American actor

== December 17, 1949 (Saturday) ==
- The Tierra del Fuego earthquake at the southern tip of South America reached 7.8 on the moment magnitude scale, making it the most powerful earthquake ever recorded in the south of Argentina.
- Burma diplomatically recognized Communist China, the first non-Communist country to do so.
- Born: Dušan Mitošević, footballer and manager, in Žitište, Yugoslavia; (d. 2018); Paul Rodgers, singer, songwriter and lead vocalist of rock bands Free and Bad Company, in Middlesbrough, England

== December 18, 1949 (Sunday) ==
- The Philadelphia Eagles defeated the Los Angeles Rams 14-0 in the 1949 NFL Championship Game at Los Angeles Memorial Coliseum.
- Nikita Khrushchev was made a secretary of the Central Committee of the Communist Party of the Soviet Union.
- Parliamentary elections were held in Bulgaria, the first non-competitive elections held under Communist rule. Voters were presented with a single list of candidates from the Fatherland Front, which claimed almost 100% approval.

== December 19, 1949 (Monday) ==
- Syrian Army Commander Sami al-Hinnawi and some of his associates were arrested and accused of plotting to unite Iraq and Syria under the Iraqi crown.
- Robert Menzies became Prime Minister of Australia for the second time.
- The trial of Erich von Manstein ended with the German general found guilty of nine war crimes charges and acquitted on eight. Manstein was sentenced to 18 years in prison by a British military court.
- Born: Sebastian, singer, as Knud Christensen in Sønderborg, Denmark

== December 20, 1949 (Tuesday) ==
- Clark Gable and Sylvia Ashley were married at a ranch in Solvang, California. It was the fourth marriage for both of them.
- EC Comics published the first in its new line of pulp-suspense comics titled The Crypt of Terror (cover date April–May 1950). In a few issues' time the comic would be renamed to a much more familiar title: Tales from the Crypt.
- Born: Cecil Cooper, baseball player and manager, in Brenham, Texas; Oscar Gamble, baseball player, in Ramer, Alabama (d. 2018); Claudia Jennings, actress, as Mary Chesterton in Saint Paul, Minnesota (d. 1979)

== December 21, 1949 (Wednesday) ==
- Joseph Stalin was awarded the Order of Lenin as part of celebrations of his 70th birthday. The creation of the Stalin Peace Prize (later renamed the Lenin Peace Prize) was also announced, to be given to between five and ten people every December 21 starting in 1950. Press dispatches from the Eastern Bloc reported that Stalin had received millions of congratulatory messages, but his birthday was not mentioned in Yugoslavian newspapers.
- At a Four Power Allied meeting in Tokyo, Soviet representative Kuzma Derevyanko walked out with his delegation rather than answer to an American charge that Russia was forcing thousands of Japanese prisoners into forced labor in Siberia.
- The romantic religious epic film Samson and Delilah directed by Cecil B. DeMille and starring Hedy Lamarr and Victor Mature was released.
- The war film Twelve O'Clock High starring Gregory Peck premiered in Los Angeles.
- Born: Thomas Sankara, revolutionary and President of Burkina Faso, in Yako, French Upper Volta (d. 1987)

== December 22, 1949 (Thursday) ==
- Eleven US Army Air Force flyers including Rogers Hornsby Jr., son of the baseball Hall of Famer, were killed when their Boeing B-50 Superfortress crashed into a swamp near Savannah, Georgia.
- Born: Maurice Gibb (d. 2003) and Robin Gibb (d. 2012), twin members of the pop group the Bee Gees, in Douglas, Isle of Man
- Died: Gertrude Bacon, 75, English aeronautical pioneer

== December 23, 1949 (Friday) ==
- Pope Pius XII invited all Protestants and Jews to "return to the one true church" to unite against militant atheism. Protestant and Jewish leaders who commented said they had no intention of accepting the invitation.
- The New York Stock Exchange rose to its highest levels since August 1946.
- Born: Adrian Belew, guitarist, songwriter and producer, in Covington, Kentucky

== December 24, 1949 (Saturday) ==
- Mungyeong Massacre: Soldiers of the South Korean Army killed 86 to 88 unarmed civilians in Mungyeong on suspicion of being communists or communist supporters.
- Pope Pius XII opened the Holy Door at St. Peter's Basilica to mark the beginning of the 1950 Holy Year.
- The United States and Yugoslavia signed an agreement allowing American civil airplanes to use Yugoslav airfields and fly through Yugoslav airspace en route to other countries.
- Martial law was lifted in the Athens, Peloponnese and island regions of Greece.
- Born: Randy Neugebauer, politician, in St. Louis, Missouri

== December 25, 1949 (Sunday) ==
- The Czech government outlawed as "traitors" all persons who fled the country after the Communist coup of February 1948.
- The Khabarovsk War Crime Trials began in the Soviet city of Khabarovsk. Twelve members of the Japanese Kwantung Army were put on trial for manufacturing and using biological weapons during World War II.
- Actors Cary Grant and Betsy Drake were married in a private home in Phoenix, Arizona. Howard Hughes flew the couple in from Hollywood and served as best man.
- Born: Simone Bittencourt de Oliveira, singer, in Salvador, Bahia, Brazil; Nawaz Sharif, three-time prime minister of Pakistan, in Lahore, Pakistan; Sissy Spacek, actress, in Quitman, Texas; Joe Louis Walker, blues musician, in San Francisco, California (d. 2025)
- Died: Leon Schlesinger, 65, American film producer

== December 26, 1949 (Monday) ==
- Albert Einstein published his new "Generalized Theory of Gravitation".
- Yugoslavia and Britain signed a 5-year trade agreement valued at $616 million US.
- Born: José Ramos-Horta, President of East Timor, in Dili, Portuguese Timor
- Died: Julius Brandt, 76, Austrian actor, film director and screenwriter

== December 27, 1949 (Tuesday) ==
- Queen Juliana of the Netherlands transferred sovereignty over Indonesia in a ceremony in Amsterdam.
- Argentine President Juan Perón sued two prominent newspapers, La Nación and La Prensa, for printing a statement by opposition Deputy Col. Atilio Cattáneo claiming that Perón had enriched himself through the presidency.
- Born: Klaus Fischer, footballer and coach, in Kreuzstraßl, Regen, West Germany
- Died: Antoni Ponikowski, 71, Polish academician and 7th prime minister of Poland

== December 28, 1949 (Wednesday) ==
- The United States diplomatically recognized Indonesia.
- Time magazine announced that Winston Churchill had been chosen "man of the half-century" as featured in a special supplement in the January 2, 1950 issue.
- Born: Yasmin Aga Khan, philanthropist, in Lausanne, Switzerland
- Died: Jack Lovelock, 39, New Zealand athlete (hit by a train)

== December 29, 1949 (Thursday) ==
- The Hungarian government issued a sweeping decree ordering the nationalization of all remaining businesses still in private hands or financed by foreign capital. American, British, Swiss, French and Dutch firms were affected by the order.
- KC2XAK in Bridgeport, Connecticut became the first regularly operating UHF television station.

== December 30, 1949 (Friday) ==
- India diplomatically recognized Communist China.
- Born: Bruce Fairbairn, musician and record producer, in Vancouver, British Columbia (d. 1999)
- Died: Leopold IV, Prince of Lippe, 78

== December 31, 1949 (Saturday) ==
- Israel rejected a request by the UN Trusteeship council for the removal of Israeli government offices from Jerusalem.
- The Khabarovsk War Crime Trials ended with all twelve defendants found guilty and sentenced to terms ranging from 2 to 25 years in a labor camp.
- Big Ben became part of televised New Year's Eve festivities for the first time when cameras were set up on the roof of St Thomas' Hospital to show viewers the big clock striking in the new year, a sight that has been a TV tradition ever since.
- Born: Delwa Kassiré Koumakoye, 6th and 13th Prime Minister of Chad, in Bongor, Chad
- Died: Josef Maria Auchentaller, 84, Austrian artist; Raimond Valgre, 36, Estonian composer

December 1949 was the twelfth and final month of the common year. It began on a Thursday and ended after 31 days on a Saturday. It was also the last month of the 1940s.
