= Charles Collingwood =

Charles Collingwood may refer to:

- Charles Collingwood (actor) (born 1943), British actor, best known for his work in the BBC Radio 4 soap opera The Archers
- Charles Collingwood (journalist) (1917–1985), American newscaster for CBS
- Sir Charles Arthur Collingwood (1887–1964), British barrister and High Court judge
