= Obice da 305/17 =

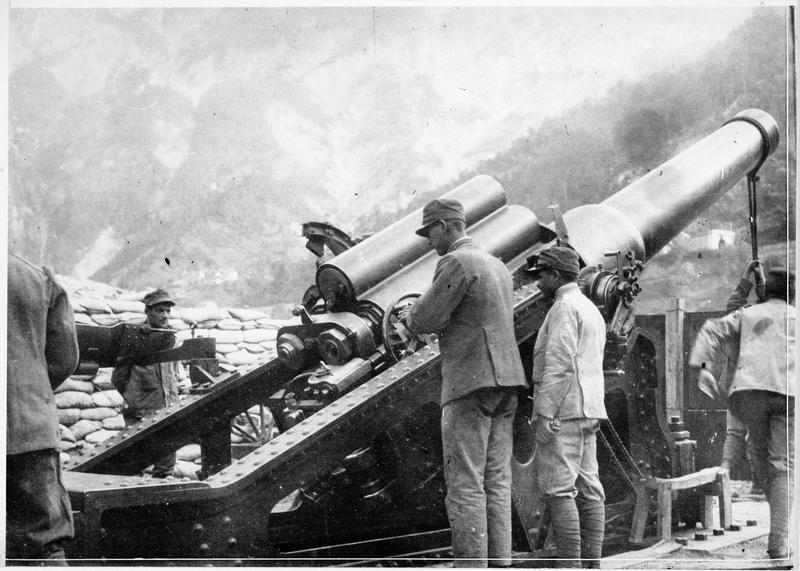
- A 305/17 on a Garrone coastal mount.
- Place of origin: Kingdom of Italy

Service history
- In service: 1914–1959
- Used by: Kingdom of Italy; Nationalist Spain
- Wars: World War I Spanish Civil War; World War II

Production history
- Designer: Armstrong-Pozzuoli
- Designed: 1908
- Manufacturer: Armstrong-Pozzuoli; Vickers-Terni
- Produced: 1914−1917
- No. built: 30-44

Specifications
- Mass: Combat: 33.7 t (33.2 long tons)
- Barrel length: 5.8 m (19 ft) L/17
- Crew: 10
- Shell: Separate loading bagged charge and projectile
- Shell weight: 295–442 kg (650–974 lb)
- Caliber: 305 mm (12 in)
- Breech: Interrupted screw
- Recoil: Hydro-pneumatic
- Carriage: Box trail
- Elevation: -20° to +65°
- Traverse: 360°
- Rate of fire: Maximum: 1 round every 5 minutes Sustained: 1 round every 12 minutes
- Muzzle velocity: 545 m/s (1,790 ft/s)
- Maximum firing range: 17.6 km (11 mi)

Obice da 305/17 was an Italian howitzer (sometimes classified as mortar) used during World War I. Produced by the Armstrong works in Italy between 1914 and 1917, approximately 30-44 were built. Originally the Obice da 305/17 Modello 15 was a stationary coastal defense gun but was later adapted to a mobile siege artillery role. A number also served during World War II.

== History ==
In 1908 the Italian coastal artillery analyzed reports from the Russo-Japanese War of the performance of their Armstrong 280 mm (11 in) howitzers that they had supplied to Japan and found them unsatisfactory. They then turned to the companies Armstrong, Krupp, Schneider, St Chamond and Vickers-Terni for proposals for a 305 mm (12 in) howitzer. The Inspector General of Artillery chose the design from Armstrong-Pozzuoli, with modifications to the ammunition, and loading system.

== Design ==
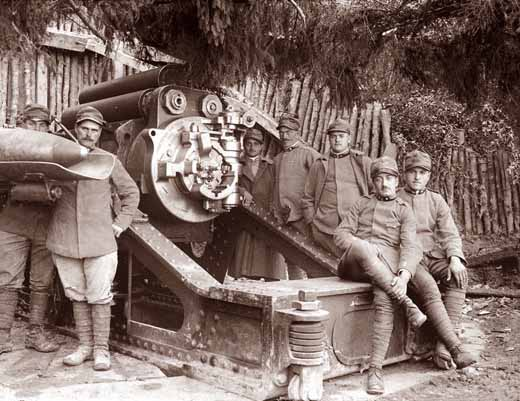
A 305/17 showing its box trail carriage, screw breech, traverse wheels and loading tray.

The 5.8 m (19 ft) long barrel of the 305/17 was made of steel and was rifled with 60 left-hand constant twist grooves. Although the overall length of the barrel and breech was 19 calibers, the Italians designated their artillery by the length of the barrel only which was 17 calibers. The barrel was then inserted into a ring cradle which housed two cylinders of the hydraulic recoil mechanism and the pneumatic recuperator cylinder located above the barrel. The barrel was mounted on trunnions towards the middle and the wedge-shaped box trail carriage had a large open space behind the breech to allow for recoil, high angles of elevation and reloading. The weight of the barrel and breech was 12.79 t (12.59 long tons). The 305/17 had an interrupted screw breech and used separate loading bagged charges and projectiles.

=== Variants ===
- Obice da 305/17 G Modello 1915 - The initial model was a stationary coastal defense gun which rested on a metal platform designed by General Garrone which allowed for 360° of traverse. The G in the guns designation stood for Garrone. For traverse the carriage pivoted in the center and there were four castor wheels at the edges of the carriage.
- Obice da 305/17 G Modello 1916 - The Modello 1916 was a modified version which was lightened and simplified to allow the gun to be broken down into multiple loads and reassembled in the field to act as a mobile siege gun. For transport, it was broken down into the barrel, recoil system and ring cradle, top carriage and gun platform. Once onsite a pit could be dug for the pyramid-shaped earth anchor and then assembled with winches and ramps in 24 hours.
- Obice da 305/17 G Modello 1917 - The Modello 1917 was also a mobile version designed to disassembled and used in a siege artillery role. A gun battery consisted of two howitzers with 8 wagons, 2 machine guns for defense, a utility wagon, and 5 artillery tractors. The wagons could be towed at 6–8 km/h (4–5 mph) and set up time remained 24 hours.
- Obice da 305/17 D.S. - These guns were mounted on the same "De Stefano" carriage for land use and the resulting guns were classified by their size in millimeters 305, their length in calibers 17 and lastly by their carriage type DS which stood for De Stefano. The De Stefano carriage was a clever, but strange looking monstrosity which looked something like a child's 4-wheeled toy-horse when the gun barrel was elevated. The carriage was a large 4-wheeled box-trail design with two non-steerable wheels on the front and two castering wheels at the rear. The wheels were fitted with detachable grousers designed by major Crispino Bonagente for traction on soft ground and were towed in one piece by a Pavesi-Tolotti artillery tractor. When not on the move the grousers were removed and the steel wheels rode on an inclined set of steel rails when in firing position. The steel rails were mounted on a firing platform made of wooden beams which allowed the gun 360°of traverse. When the gun fired recoil which was not absorbed by the recoil mechanism was transmitted to the wheels and the carriage rolled up the inclined rails and then rolled back into firing position. The box trail carriage was tall and wide enough that the breech of the gun was accessible at high angles of elevation without a pit being dug and the gun crew had a bucket and hoist for ammunition handling.

== Service ==
=== World War I ===
Although the majority of combatants had heavy field artillery prior to the outbreak of the First World War, none had adequate numbers of heavy guns in service, nor had they foreseen the growing importance of heavy artillery once the Italian Front stagnated and trench warfare set in. Fortresses, armories, coastal fortifications, and museums were scoured for heavy artillery and sent to the front. Suitable field and rail carriages were built for these guns in an effort to give their forces the heavy field artillery needed to overcome trenches and hardened concrete fortifications. Indirect fire, interdiction and counter-battery fire emphasized the importance of long-range heavy artillery. In order to address the Italian Army's lack of long-range heavy artillery 254B, 254/40, 305/17, 305/40, and 305/46 Naval Guns were converted to land use.

The first howitzers entered service with units of the coastal artillery in 1914, with 12 at La Spezia, 4 at La Maddalena and 4 at Messina. In October 1917, 38 pieces were available in the three versions. A number of guns were disassembled and redeployed to the Alpine front to act as siege artillery. After the loss of 9 guns following the Battle of Caporetto, another 18 were produced between 1 July 1918 and 30 June 1919, thus reaching the total of 44 guns, of which 8 were in reserve.

=== Spanish Civil War ===
In 1937, 5 pieces were delivered to the Nationalists during the Spanish Civil War.

=== World War II ===
In 1939, 10 Modello 16 and 17 Modello 17's were in service. These armed the 540th battery of the 22nd Artillery Group of the Guardia alla Frontiera (G.a.F.), a battery of the XXIX and one of the XXXI Group of the 24th artillery Regiment G.a.F. and the 4th Army Army Artillery Grouping. These were used in the French Campaign, the defense of Naples and in the defense of the Sicilian coast. Another 16 guns on a shielded coastal mount were supplied to 4 coastal batteries of the Regia Marina, manned by MILMART personnel. Some guns remained in service in the post-war period and were retired in 1959.

== Photo Gallery ==
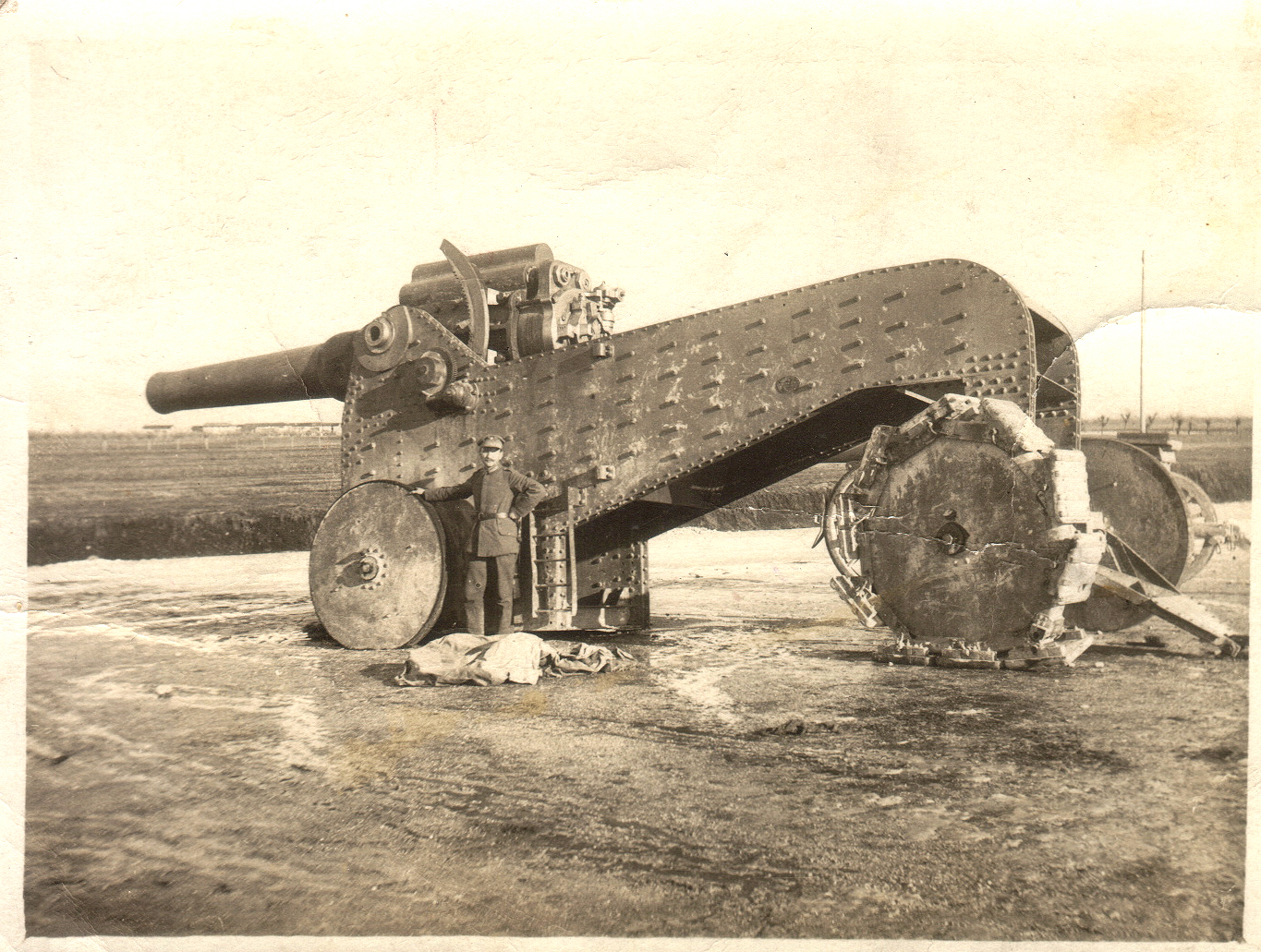
A 305/17 modello 16 howitzer on a De Stefano carriage with Bonagente grousers.

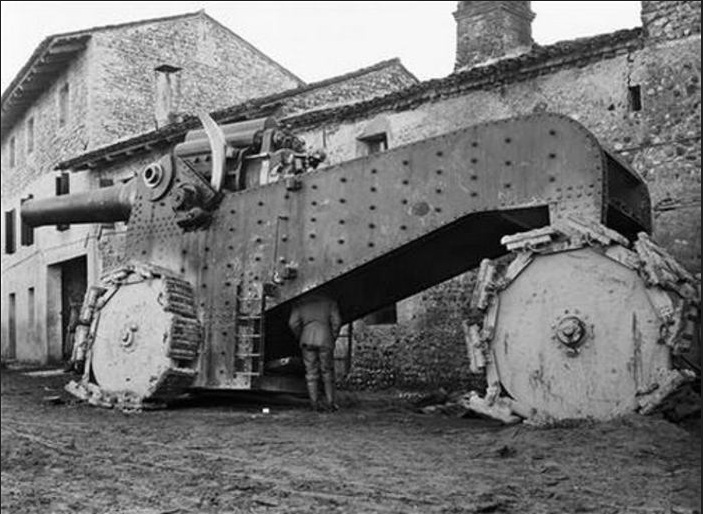
A 305/17 modello 16 captured by the Austrians in a village near Udine. Photo by Jindřich Bišický.

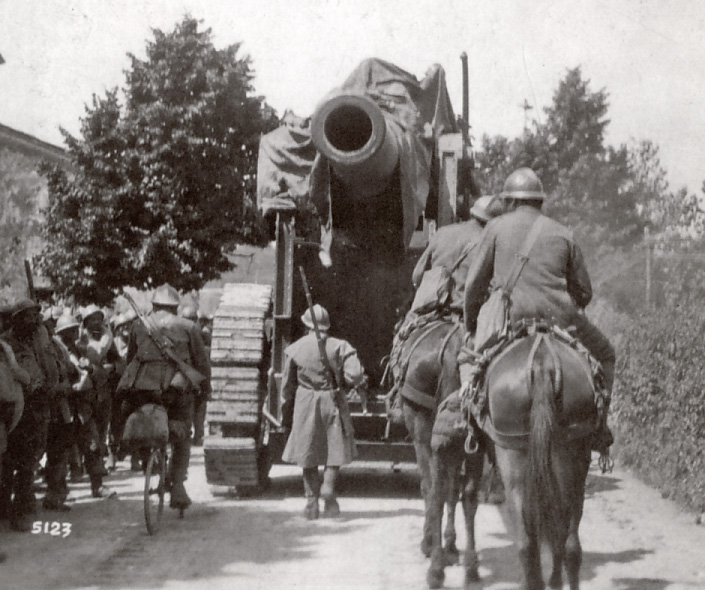
305/17 modello 16 howitzer in retreat after the Battle of Caporetto.

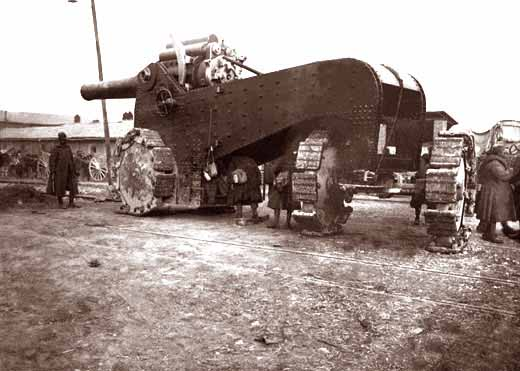
A 305/17 gun in traveling position showing its castering rear wheels.

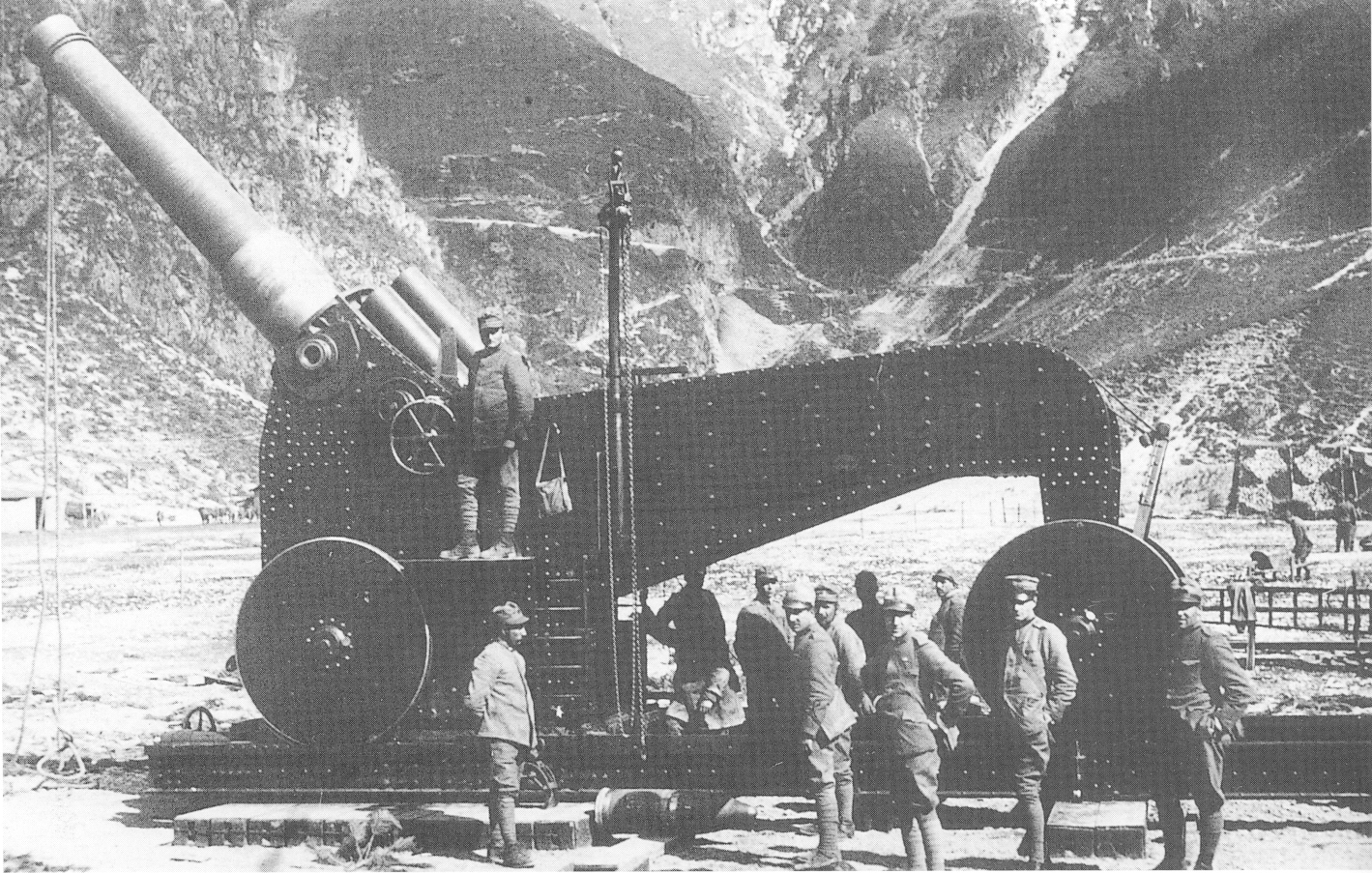
A 305/17 showing its firing platform.

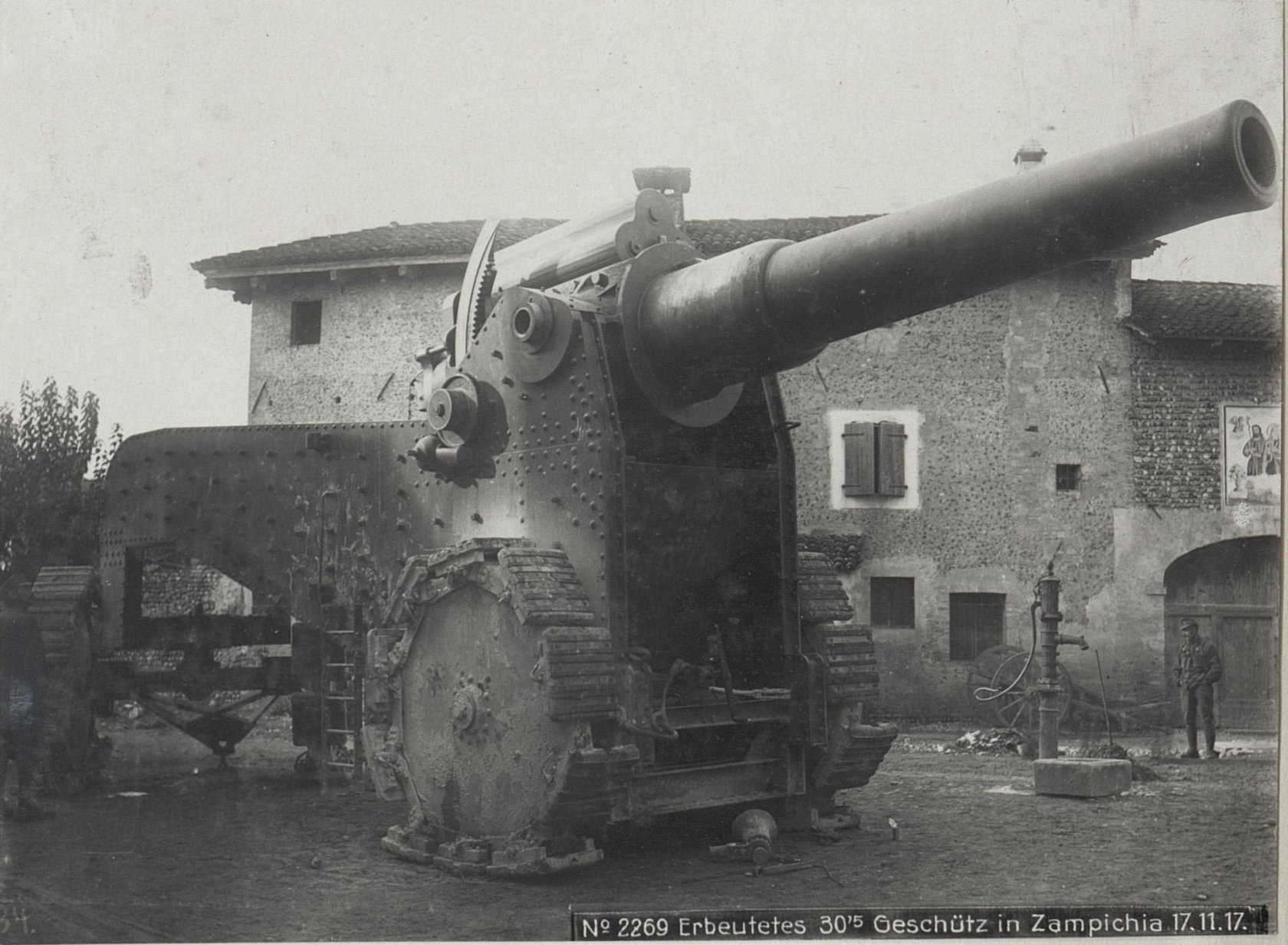

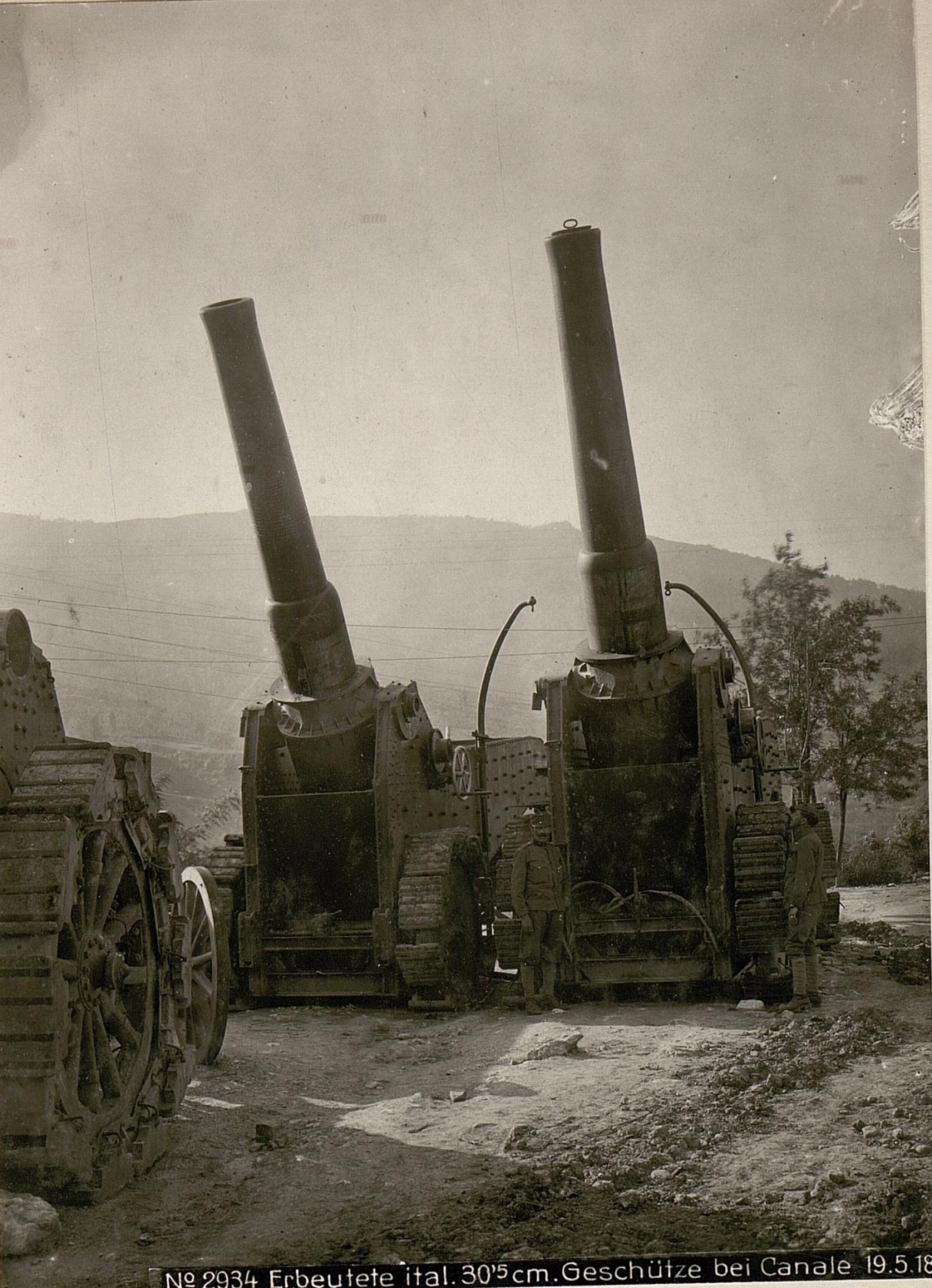

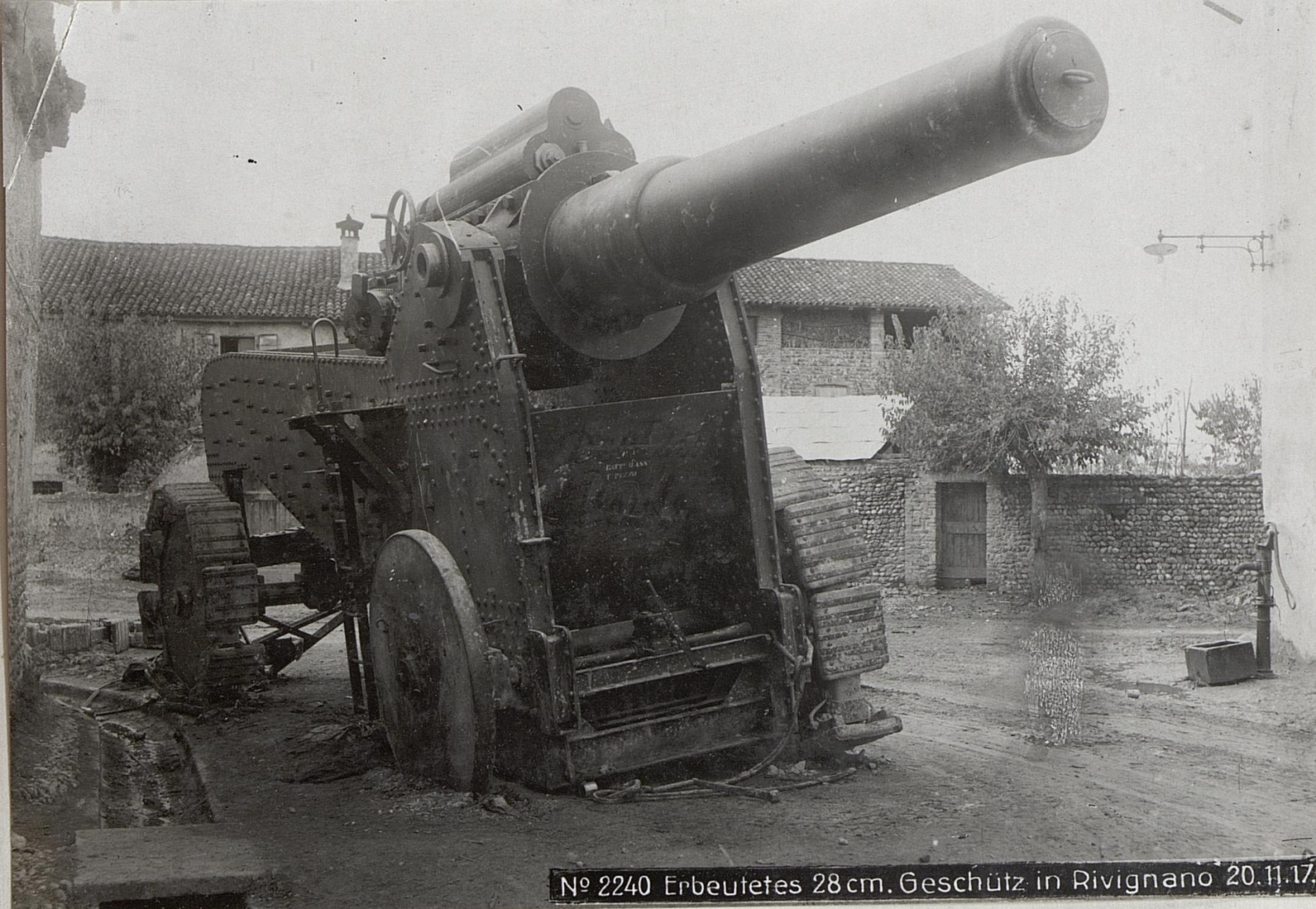

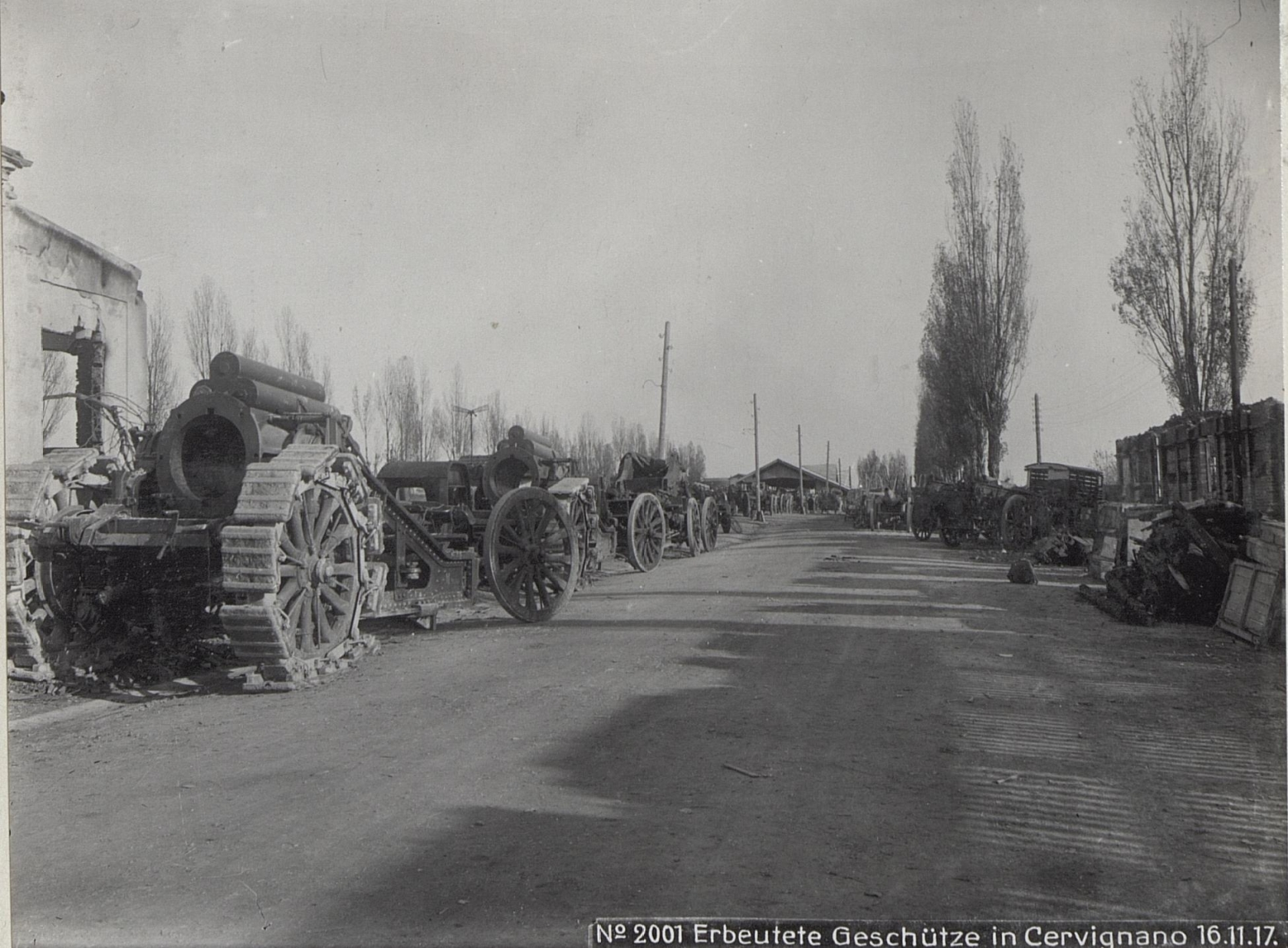

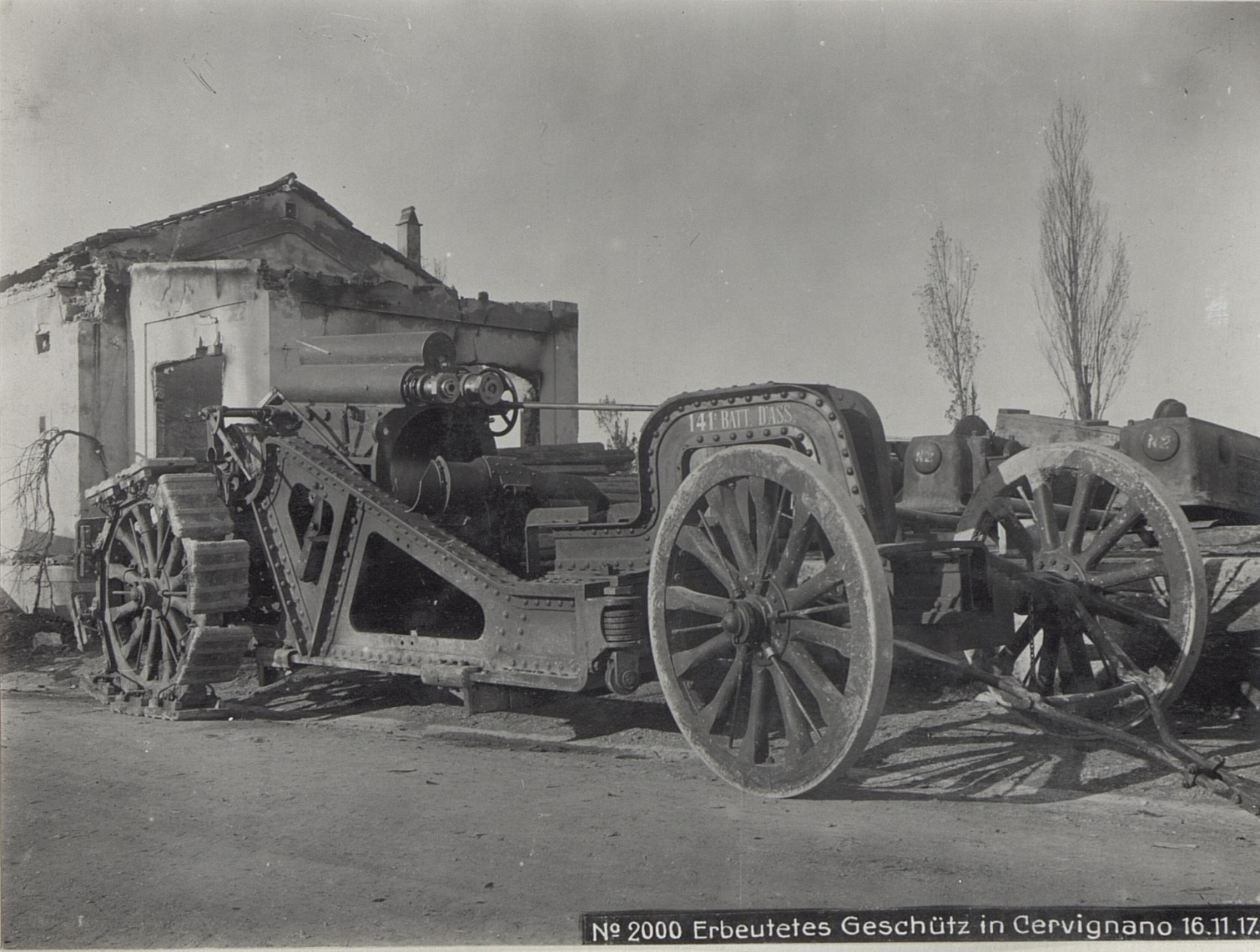
