= September 1949 =

Month of 1949

<<	September 1949					>>
Su	Mo	Tu	We	Th	Fr	Sa
				1	2	3
4	5	6	7	8	9	10
11	12	13	14	15	16	17
18	19	20	21	22	23	24
25	26	27	28	29	30

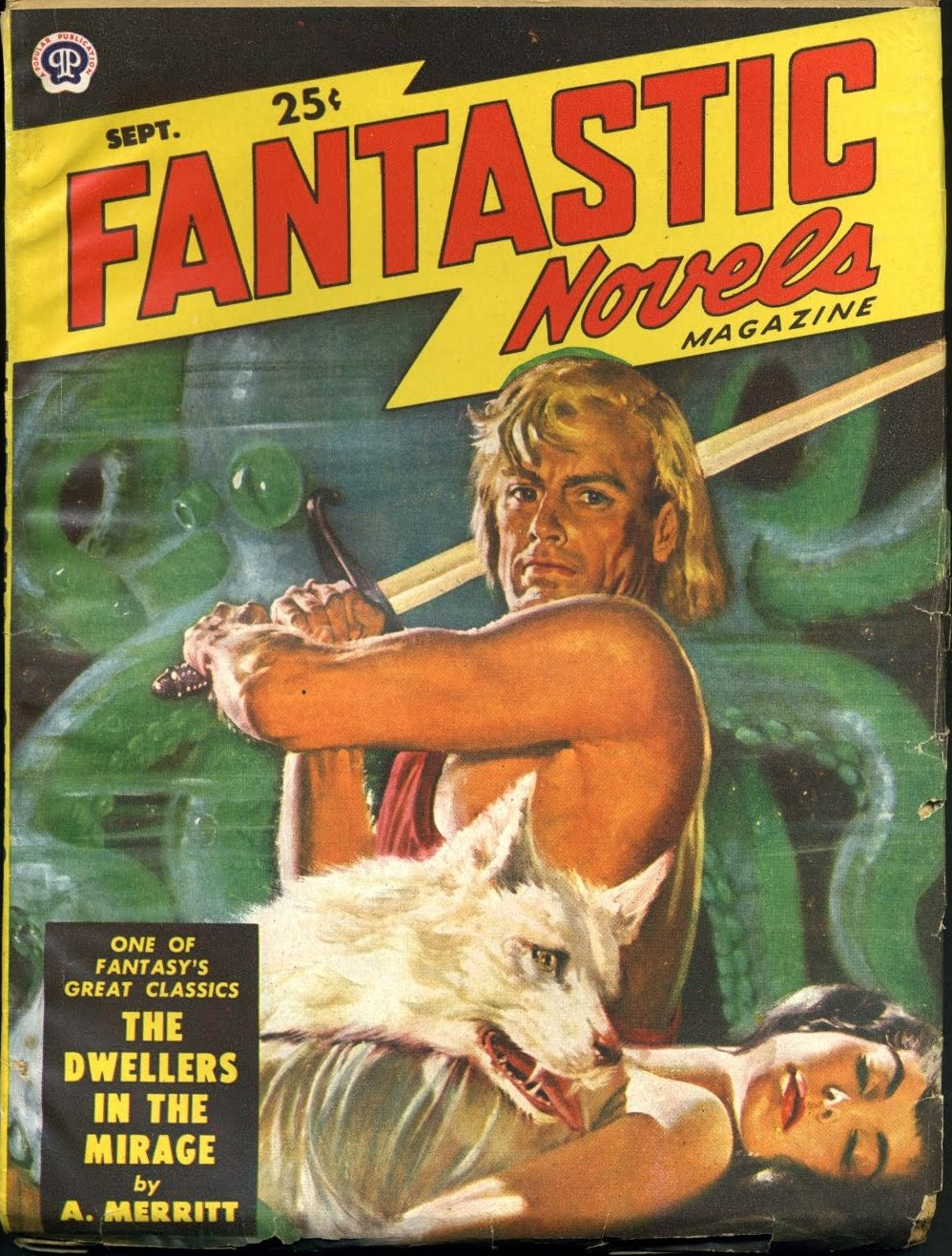
Cover of the September 1949 issue of Fantastic Novels magazine

The following events occurred in September 1949:

== September 1, 1949 (Thursday) ==
- Pope Pius XII wrote Decennium Dum Expletur, an Apostolic Letter to the bishops of Poland about the suffering of the Polish people.
- Born:
  - Fidel Castro Díaz-Balart, nuclear physicist, in Havana, Cuba (d. 2018)
  - Leslie Feinberg, transgender activist, in Kansas City, Missouri (d. 2014)

== September 2, 1949 (Friday) ==
- A fire swept through Chongqing, China that killed 1,700 people and gutted upwards of 10,000 homes by the time it burned out eighteen hours later. The fire, which originated in the city's slum district, was mysterious in origin although the Nationalists quickly rounded up suspected Communists and would eventually execute one for arson.
- General Douglas MacArthur issued a 3,000-word statement declaring that four years of "fully and faithfully" complying with Allied occupation had merited Japan the right to a peace treaty.
- The 3rd Cannes Film Festival opened.
- The film noir The Third Man starring Joseph Cotten, Alida Valli, Orson Welles and Trevor Howard premiered at the Plaza Theatre in London.
- The film noir White Heat starring James Cagney premiered in New York City.
- Born: Moira Stuart, British newsreader and presenter in London, England

== September 3, 1949 (Saturday) ==
- Chinese Communist forces captured Xining.
- Joseph De Bona won the Bendix Trophy in a modified F-51 Mustang, setting a new average speed record of 470 miles per hour.
- "You're Breaking My Heart" by Vic Damone hit #1 on the Billboard singles chart.
- Born: T. Michael Moseley, United States Air Force General, in Grand Prairie, Texas

== September 4, 1949 (Sunday) ==
- Peekskill riots: One thousand anti-Communist demonstrators picketed an open-air concert by Paul Robeson in Peekskill, New York. Violence broke out after the concert resulting in 48 people being injured.
- The Bristol Brabazon airliner prototype had its first flight.
- Born:
  - Tom Watson, golfer, in Kansas City, Missouri
  - János Vargha, Hungarian biologist, environmentalist and photographer

== September 5, 1949 (Monday) ==
- Spain received its first visit from a monarch in over twenty years when King Abdullah of Jordan arrived for an eleven-day visit.
- Japanese Admiral Soemu Toyoda was acquitted of war crimes charges.
- The Ningxia Campaign began.
- The Médaille de la Gendarmerie nationale was created in France.
- Died: Friedrich Hopfner, 67, Austrian geodesist, geophysicist and planetary scientist

== September 6, 1949 (Tuesday) ==
- Unemployed World War II veteran Howard Unruh shot and killed 13 people during a twelve-minute walk through his neighborhood in Camden, New Jersey. He would be found criminally insane and spend 60 years in an asylum until his death in 2009.
- The Nero Wolfe detective novel The Second Confession by Rex Stout was published.

== September 7, 1949 (Wednesday) ==
- In Bonn, the Parliament of West Germany met for the first time.
- Born: Lee McGeorge Durrell, naturalist and zookeeper, in Memphis, Tennessee
- Died: José Clemente Orozco, 65, Mexican painter

== September 8, 1949 (Thursday) ==
- A gunfight broke out in the Colombian House of Representatives that killed one Congressman and wounded three others.
- Construction of the Toronto subway began when Ontario Lieutenant Governor Ray Lawson pulled a lever that drove the first pile driver into the ground on the Yonge Line.
- The Nelson Algren novel The Man with the Golden Arm was published.
- Died: Constantin Petrovicescu, 65, Romanian soldier and politician (died in prison); Richard Strauss, 85, German composer

== September 9, 1949 (Friday) ==
- A Douglas DC-3 exploded and crashed at Sault-au-Cochon, Quebec when a bomb went off in the forward baggage compartment, killing all 23 aboard. The bomb was planted by Albert Guay in a plot to kill his wife; he and two accomplices would be hanged for their crimes.
- More than 5,200 operating employees of the Missouri Pacific Railroad went on strike.
- Edwin Alonzo Boyd, leader of the notorious Boyd Gang, committed his first bank robbery when he robbed a North York branch of the Bank of Montreal.
- Born:
  - John Curry, figure skater, in Birmingham, England (d. 1994)
  - Joe Theismann, NFL quarterback and sportscaster, in New Brunswick, New Jersey
  - Susilo Bambang Yudhoyono, 6th President of Indonesia, in Tremas, Pacitan Regency, Indonesia

== September 10, 1949 (Saturday) ==
- Eight high-ranking Hungarian officials including László Rajk were indicted in Budapest on charges of plotting with US and Yugoslavian agents to overthrow the Communist government.
- Miss Arizona Jacque Mercer was crowned Miss America 1949.
- Born:
  - Don Muraco, professional wrestler, at Sunset Beach, Hawaii
  - Bill O'Reilly, journalist, writer and political commentator, in New York City
  - Tony Proudfoot, Canadian Football League player, teacher, coach and broadcaster, in Winnipeg, Manitoba, Canada (d. 2010)
- Died: Wiley Blount Rutledge, 55, Justice of the Supreme Court of the United States

== September 11, 1949 (Sunday) ==
- Greek War Minister Panagiotis Kanellopoulos threatened to strike Albania and other Communist neighbors if they continued to serve as bases for Greek guerilla forces.
- As the Soviet Union celebrated "Tank Day", an editorial by Semyon Bogdanov in Pravda claimed that the Russians had invented the first tank in May 1915, a year and a half before the British first fielded them.
- Died: Henri Rabaud, 75, French conductor and composer

== September 12, 1949 (Monday) ==
- The Lausanne Conference of 1949 ended.
- A mentally ill Jewish youth slipped into the Knesset and began shouting defiance at the government, pointing a submachine gun at Prime Minister David Ben-Gurion. The intruder was seized by police before he could do any harm.
- Died: Harry Burleigh, 82, African-American composer

== September 13, 1949 (Tuesday) ==
- Theodor Heuss became the 1st President of West Germany.
- The Soviet Union cast seven vetoes to deny United Nations membership to Portugal, Jordan, Italy, Finland, Ireland, Austria and Ceylon.
- 4-year-old Karen Lee Anderson of Grand Coulee Dam, Washington, was fatally burned in Black Sand Basin at Yellowstone National Park when she pulled away from the adult holding her hand and fell into a hot spring.
- Born: Rick Dempsey, baseball player, in Fayetteville, Tennessee; John W. Henry, businessman and owner of the Boston Red Sox baseball team, in Quincy, Illinois
- Died: August Krogh, 74, Danish zoo physiologist and Nobel laureate

== September 14, 1949 (Wednesday) ==
- The Romanian newspaper Scînteia accused Marshal Tito of planning to invade Romania and help overthrow Hungary's Communist government.
- New York Governor Thomas E. Dewey ordered a special grand jury investigation into the Peekskill riots, claiming that Communists provoked the September 4 disturbance.
- 63-year-old Minnie Edith Kindig of Long Beach, California, fainted and fell 500 feet (150 m) to her death when she approached the edge of Yaki Point in Grand Canyon National Park.
- Born: Eikichi Yazawa, singer-songwriter, in Hiroshima, Japan
- Died: Gottfried Graf von Bismarck-Schönhausen, 48, German politician and German Resistance figure (car accident); Pandeli Evangjeli, 90, 7th Prime Minister of Albania

== September 15, 1949 (Thursday) ==
- Konrad Adenauer became 1st Chancellor of West Germany.
- The Western TV series The Lone Ranger starring Clayton Moore premiered on ABC.
- Born: Joe Barton, politician, in Waco, Texas
- Died: Heinie Beckendorf, 65, American baseball player

== September 16, 1949 (Friday) ==
- The Supreme Court of Georgia upheld a voter re-registration law aimed at suppressing the black vote. The court ruled that since the law made no mention of races or discrimination, it was legal until it could be proved that someone was discriminated against under the law.
- A Gallup Poll listed Bob Hope as America's most popular comedian. Milton Berle finished second while Jack Benny, Red Skelton and Fibber McGee and Molly rounded out the top five.
- Born: Ed Begley, Jr., actor, in Los Angeles, California; Chrisye, pop singer and songwriter, in Jakarta, Indonesia (d. 2007)

== September 17, 1949 (Saturday) ==
- The passenger ship SS Noronic was destroyed in a fire at Toronto Harbour with the loss of at least 118 lives.
- Born: Didith Reyes, actress and singer, in Biñan, Philippines (d. 2008)

== September 18, 1949 (Sunday) ==
- The British government devaluated the pound sterling by 30%, from $4.03 US to $2.80. Chancellor of the Exchequer Sir Stafford Cripps delivered a 29-minute radio speech announcing the move, explaining that it was necessary to bring in more foreign dollars in exchange for British exports.
- Members of the International Typographical Union voted to end a 22-month long strike against Chicago's newspapers and accept a new contract.
- A Rage To Live by John O'Hara topped The New York Times Fiction Best Seller list.
- Born: Mo Mowlam, politician, in Watford, England (d. 2005); Peter Shilton, footballer, in Leicester, England
- Died: Frank Morgan, 59, American actor

== September 19, 1949 (Monday) ==
- Nineteen countries, including Australia, Canada, Finland, France, India, Ireland, Israel, New Zealand, Norway and Sweden, followed Britain in devaluing their currencies against the US dollar.
- Born:
  - Richard Rogler, Kabarett artist, in Selb, West Germany (d. 2024)
  - Ernie Sabella, American actor, in Westchester County, New York
  - Twiggy, British model, actress and singer, née Lesley Hornby in Neasden, England
  - Sidney Wicks, American basketball player, in Los Angeles, California
- Died: Will Cuppy, 65, American humorist; Nikos Skalkottas, 45, Greek composer

== September 20, 1949 (Tuesday) ==
- Brigadier General Carlos P. Romulo of the Philippines was elected President of the United Nations General Assembly.
- Died: Richard Dix, 56, American film actor

== September 21, 1949 (Wednesday) ==
- The Chinese People's Political Consultative Conference opened in Beijing with Mao Zedong telling the opening session: "We announce the establishment of the People's Republic of China."
- Born: Artis Gilmore, basketball player, in Chipley, Florida

== September 22, 1949 (Thursday) ==
- George Marshall was appointed by US President Harry S. Truman to succeed Basil O'Connor as President of the American Red Cross.
- Died: Kim Jong-suk, 31, Korean guerilla fighter, Communist activist and first wife of North Korean leader Kim Il Sung (cause unknown); Sam Wood, 66, American film director

== September 23, 1949 (Friday) ==
- President Truman issued a terse statement announcing that the US government had "evidence that within recent weeks an atomic explosion occurred in the U.S.S.R."
- Born:
  - Bruce Springsteen, singer and songwriter, in Long Branch, New Jersey
  - Floella Benjamin, British television presenter in Pointe-à-Pierre, Trinidad and Tobago

== September 24, 1949 (Saturday) ==
- László Rajk and two co-defendants were sentenced to death for plotting to overthrow the Hungarian government.
- Quebec jeweller Albert Guay was formally charged with murder for the Quebec Airways explosion of September 9.
- The Ningxia Campaign ended in Communist victory.
- Died: Pierre de Bréville, 88, French composer

== September 25, 1949 (Sunday) ==
- Moscow radio broadcast a statement by TASS acknowledging for the first time that the USSR had an atomic weapon. The statement added that "despite the existence in this country of an atomic weapon, this country adopts and intends to adopt in the future its former position in favor of prohibition of the atomic weapon."
- During the early hours of the morning at the El Morocco nightclub in Manhattan, actor Humphrey Bogart allegedly shoved a woman to the floor for trying to snatch a 3-foot high stuffed toy panda bear that he had bought for his son. Bogart later told the press that he had merely wrestled the panda back from the woman and that while she may have fallen down, "she looked as if she'd been drinking too many Coca-Colas." An assault charge against Bogart was later dismissed.
- Born: Pedro Almodóvar, filmmaker, in Calzada de Calatrava, Spain

== September 26, 1949 (Monday) ==
- A Douglas DC-3 of Mexicana de Aviación crashed into Mount Popocatépetl in Mexico, killing all 24 aboard.
- Viking Press published Samuel Putnam's acclaimed new translation of Don Quixote, the first in contemporary English.
- The mystery novel Cat of Many Tails by Ellery Queen was published.
- Born: Jane Smiley, novelist, in Los Angeles, California

== September 27, 1949 (Tuesday) ==
- After two years of negotiations, the USSR agreed to return 30 small naval vessels obtained from the United States during World War II under Lend-Lease.
- Prohibition in Oklahoma was upheld in a special state election. This was the fifth failed attempt to repeal prohibition in the state, with similar referendums in 1908, 1910, 1936 and 1940 all going down in defeat as well.
- The flag of the People's Republic of China was adopted.
- Ted Williams of the Boston Red Sox reached base safely for the 84th consecutive game, establishing a major league baseball record that still stands.
- Born: Mike Schmidt, baseball player, in Dayton, Ohio
- Died: David Adler, 67, American architect

== September 28, 1949 (Wednesday) ==
- Britain and Czechoslovakia signed a 5-year trade pact which included compensation for British properties nationalized or expropriated by the Czechoslovak Communist government.
- The Movement for the Social Evolution of Black Africa was founded by Barthélemy Boganda in Bangui, Ubangi-Shari.

== September 29, 1949 (Thursday) ==
- "Tokyo Rose" Iva Toguri D'Aquino was found guilty on one of eight charges of treason.
- The Soviet Union renounced its April 1945 treaty of friendship and mutual assistance with Yugoslavia, accusing the Tito government of carrying on "hostile and disruptive work" at the instigation of "foreign imperialist circles."
- George Lascelles, 7th Earl of Harewood married Marion Stein at St. Mark's Church in Mayfair, London.

== September 30, 1949 (Friday) ==
- The Berlin airlift was officially terminated after 277,264 flights delivering 2.3 million tons of supplies since June 26, 1948.
- Mao Zedong was elected chairman of the new Central Government of the People's Republic of China.
- Born: Charlie McCreevy, politician, in Sallins, Ireland
