= November 1949 =

Month of 1949

<<	November 1949					>>
Su	Mo	Tu	We	Th	Fr	Sa
		1	2	3	4	5
6	7	8	9	10	11	12
13	14	15	16	17	18	19
20	21	22	23	24	25	26
27	28	29	30

The following events occurred in November 1949:

== November 1, 1949 (Tuesday) ==
- Eastern Air Lines Flight 537, a Douglas DC-4 en route from Boston to Washington, D.C., collided in mid-air with a Lockheed P-38 Lightning being test-flown for the Bolivian government near Washington National Airport. All 55 aboard the DC-4 were killed, making it the worst airliner disaster in United States history up to that time.
- Born: Jeannie Berlin, actress, in Los Angeles, California; Homi K. Bhabha, Indian scholar and critical theorist, in Bombay, India; David Foster, musician and record producer, in Victoria, British Columbia; Belita Moreno, actress, in Dallas, Texas
- Died: George J. Bates, 58, American politician (killed in the Eastern Air Lines Flight 537 crash); Helen E. Hokinson, 56, American cartoonist (killed in the Eastern Air Lines Flight 537 crash)

== November 2, 1949 (Wednesday) ==
- The Dutch–Indonesian Round Table Conference ended with ratification of the Hague Agreement Between Netherlands-Indonesia, with the Netherlands agreeing to transfer sovereignty to the United States of Indonesia by December 30, 1949.
- The British public was somewhat shocked when 19-year-old Princess Margaret was seen openly smoking a cigarette at a charity ball. No commoner had ever seen a member of the Royal Family smoke before.
- The popular radio quiz program Twenty Questions made the jump to television by premiering on WOR-TV in New York. It would run on various networks through 1955.

== November 3, 1949 (Thursday) ==
- The Battle of Dengbu Island began in the Chinese Civil War.
- The United States eased restrictions on trade with Eastern Europe in order to allow Yugoslavia to purchase commercial aircraft.
- The US Circuit Court of Appeals ordered the release of the 11 convicted Communists in the Smith Act trial on $260,000 bail pending appeal.
- The BBC revealed plans to purchase Lime Grove Studios from Rank Films for television use.
- Born: Mike Evans, actor, in Salisbury, North Carolina (d. 2006); Alexander Gradsky (born Alexander Borisovich Fradkin), Russian singer and composer, in Kopeysk, Chelyabinsk Oblast, Russian Soviet Federative Socialist Republic, Soviet Union (d. 2021, stroke); Larry Holmes, boxer, in Cuthbert, Georgia
- Died: William Desmond, 71, Irish-born American actor; Solomon R. Guggenheim, 88, American businessman and art collector

== November 4, 1949 (Friday) ==
- The UN General Assembly's Political and Security Committee recommended an arms embargo against Bulgaria and Albania, intended to force the two countries to stop aiding Greek guerrillas.
- The American radio soap opera One Man's Family made its debut in a television adaptation.
- Died: Walther von Bonstetten, 82, member of the Swiss Guide and Scout Movement

== November 5, 1949 (Saturday) ==
- The Battle of Dengbu Island ended in Nationalist victory.
- Born: Jimmie Spheeris, singer-songwriter, in Phenix City, Alabama (d. 1984); Armin Shimerman, actor, in Lakewood Township, New Jersey
- Died: Abdolhossein Hazhir, 47, Prime Minister of Iran

== November 6, 1949 (Sunday) ==
- 70 German miners were reported killed in a uranium mine near Zwickau, East Germany when the mine's powder supply blew up.
- Born: Joseph C. Wilson, diplomat, in Bridgeport, Connecticut (d. 2019)

== November 7, 1949 (Monday) ==
- The Council of Europe had its first meeting in Strasbourg.
- Eleanor Roosevelt's This I Remember, a memoir of her life with Franklin D. Roosevelt from 1924 to 1945, was published.
- Born:
  - Queen Aishwarya of Nepal, wife of King Birendra of Nepal, in Lazimpat Durbar, Kingdom of Nepal (d. 2001);
  - Judi Bari, environmentalist and labor leader, in Silver Spring, Maryland (d. 1997)
  - Judy Tenuta, American comedian and actress, in Oak Park, Illinois (d. 2022)

== November 8, 1949 (Tuesday) ==
- A general election was held in the Philippines, with incumbent President Elpidio Quirino winning a full term.
- The film noir drama All the King's Men starring Broderick Crawford and based on the Robert Penn Warren novel of the same name premiered in New York City.
- Born: Bonnie Raitt, musician, in Burbank, California

== November 9, 1949 (Wednesday) ==
- At the United Nations, the Soviet Union accused the United States and Britain of preparing Libya as a North African attack base against the USSR.
- The East German People's Chamber restored full civil and economic rights to former Nazis not convicted of war crimes.
- The George Eastman Museum dedicated to photography opened in Rochester, New York.
- The war film Battleground starring Van Johnson, John Hodiak, Ricardo Montalbán and George Murphy premiered in Washington, D.C.
- Born: Manilal H. Patel, poet, essayist, novelist and critic, in Golana Palla, Bombay State, India

== November 10, 1949 (Thursday) ==
- Soviet Foreign Minister Andrey Vyshinsky told the United Nations that the USSR was "utilizing atomic energy—but not to stockpile atomic bombs." Vishinsky claimed that the Soviet Union could stockpile as many atomic bombs as it would need, but was using atomic energy for economic purposes instead.
- Born:
  - Ann Reinking, actress, dancer and choreographer, in Seattle, Washington (d. 2020)
  - Christine Hamilton, British media personality in Bournemouth, England

== November 11, 1949 (Friday) ==
- The nationwide steelworkers strike was ended by conclusion of a pension and welfare agreement between the US Steel Corporation and United Steelworkers of America.
- Died: Prince Carlos of Bourbon-Two Sicilies, 79; Ignatiy Stelletsky, 71, Russian archaeologist and historian

== November 12, 1949 (Saturday) ==
- Yugoslavia renounced its treaty of mutual aid and friendship with Albania, severing the last major treaty link between the Tito government and its former Cominform allies.
- The Czechoslovak government announced that church marriages would no longer be recognized after January 1.
- The Volkswagen Type 2 was unveiled to the public.

== November 13, 1949 (Sunday) ==
- Parliamentary elections were held in Portugal. The ruling National Union won an election that was widely boycotted by the opposition.
- Born: Terry Reid, rock singer and guitarist, in Huntingdon, England (d. 2025)

== November 14, 1949 (Monday) ==
- The Central Committee of the Polish Communist Party expelled three ex-leaders, including former First Secretary Władysław Gomułka, on charges of deviation from the Communist line.

== November 15, 1949 (Tuesday) ==
- Near Waterval Boven in the South African Transvaal, at least 56 people were killed and 105 injured when a train filled with natives of Mozambique returning from months of work in the gold mines plunged off a 70-foot high bridge.
- Actress Nancy Davis met Ronald Reagan, then president of the Screen Actors Guild, when she was seeking Reagan's help to get her name off the Hollywood blacklist because she'd been confused with another actress of the same name. The two began dating and would marry in 1952.
- United Paramount Theatres was incorporated.
- British boxer Eddie Vann set a new record for the fastest knockout in a heavyweight boxing match when he KO'd his opponent George Stern 12 seconds into the first round.
- Died: Narayan Apte, 38, Indian activist and entrepreneur (hanged for his role in the assassination of Mahatma Gandhi); Nathuram Godse, 39, assassin of Mahatma Gandhi (hanged)

== November 16, 1949 (Wednesday) ==
- Constitutional Assembly elections were held in Syria, with the People's Party winning 63 of the 114 seats.

== November 17, 1949 (Thursday) ==
- The second trial of Alger Hiss for perjury began in New York, in the same courtroom that held the first one.
- The Women's International Democratic Federation met in Moscow with delegates from 46 nations.
- Born: John Boehner, politician, in Reading, Ohio

== November 18, 1949 (Friday) ==
- US Vice President Alben W. Barkley married Jane Hadley in St. Louis.
- Yugoslavia expelled three Russian diplomats in retaliation for the Soviet expulsion of the Yugoslavian ambassador to Moscow.
- Panamanian President Daniel Chanis Pinzón fired his National Police Chief José Remón for operating illegal monopolies in the meat-packing and bus transit industries.
- Jackie Robinson of the Brooklyn Dodgers was named the winner of the Major League Baseball Most Valuable Player Award for the National League.
- The romantic comedy film Adam's Rib starring Spencer Tracy and Katharine Hepburn was released.

== November 19, 1949 (Saturday) ==
- Eighteen United States airmen from a B-29 that crashed in the Atlantic Ocean were rescued by Canadian destroyer Haida after drifting for three days.
- Prince Rainier III was formally crowned in Monaco.
- Born: Ahmad Rashad, NFL wide receiver and sportscaster, in Portland, Oregon
- Died: James Ensor, 89, Belgian painter

== November 20, 1949 (Sunday) ==
- Panamanian President Daniel Chanis Pinzón resigned to avert an open revolt of the armed forces loyal to ousted police chief José Remón. Vice President Roberto Chiari became president with Remón's approval.

== November 21, 1949 (Monday) ==
- The United Nations General Assembly approved a compromise resolution granting independence to Libya by 1952 and to Italian Somaliland in ten years. A decision on Eritrea was deferred pending investigation.
- Bill Veeck sold the Cleveland Indians baseball team for $2.2 million to a syndicate headed by businessman Ellis Ryan.

== November 22, 1949 (Tuesday) ==
- US, British and French high commissioners signed an agreement with Chancellor Konrad Adenauer to lift many industrial and diplomatic restrictions on West Germany.
- 30 passengers aboard a river ferry south of Mandalay, Burma were killed when rebels attacked the vessel.

== November 23, 1949 (Wednesday) ==
- The Food and Agriculture Organization accepted Israel, Indonesia and Korea to membership but rejected Spain.
- Andrey Vyshinsky told the UN General Assembly meeting that Russia was fully supporting the demands of Communist China to oust the Nationalist Chinese delegation from the UN.
- Gujarat University was established in India.
- Born: Pat Condell, writer and comedian, in Dublin, Ireland
- Died: Prince Ludwig Ferdinand of Bavaria, 90

== November 24, 1949 (Thursday) ==
- The British House of Lords gave final legislative approval to a bitterly contested bill providing for nationalization of the iron and steel industry, effective January 1, 1951.
- Panama's National Police installed Arnulfo Arias as President to offset support for Daniel Chanis Pinzón.
- Fire damaged the dome of the Church of the Holy Sepulchre in Jerusalem. The fire was attributed to an accident involving a workman's blowtorch igniting a wooden portion of the roof.
- The Squaw Valley Ski Resort opened in Squaw Valley, California with the world's largest double chairlift.
- Born: Pierre Buyoya, 3rd President of Burundi, in Rutovu, Ruanda-Urundi (d. 2020)

== November 25, 1949 (Friday) ==
- Israeli Foreign Minister Moshe Sharett rejected a compromise proposal from the UN Palestine Conciliation Commission to internationalize Jerusalem.
- French labour unions staged a one-day general strike as a show of strength.
- Ted Williams of the Boston Red Sox was named the winner of the Major League Baseball Most Valuable Player Award for the American League. It was Williams' second MVP award, having previously won in 1946.
- Born: Mike Joy, television sports announcer, in Chicago, Illinois; Kerry O'Keeffe, cricketer and commentator, in Hurstville, New South Wales, Australia
- Died: Mizuno Rentarō, 81, Japanese statesman, politician and cabinet minister; Bill Robinson, 71, American tap dancer and actor

== November 26, 1949 (Saturday) ==
- The Indian Constituent Assembly approved the Constitution of India.
- Jordan followed Israel in rejecting any plan to change the system of Israeli-Jordanian control over Jerusalem.
- The Montreal Alouettes defeated the Calgary Stampeders 28-15 to win the 37th Grey Cup of Canadian football.
- Frankie Laine displaced himself at the top of the Billboard singles chart when his recording of "Mule Train" knocked "That Lucky Old Sun" out of the #1 spot.
- Born: Shlomo Artzi, folk rock musician, in Alonei Abba, Israel

== November 27, 1949 (Sunday) ==
- Presidential elections were held in Colombia. Laureano Gómez won with almost 100% of the vote after the opposition Liberal Party boycotted the polls after their candidate was the victim of a failed assassination attempt.
- The Douglas C-124 Globemaster II had its first flight.
- Born: Arlene Klasky, animator, in Omaha, Nebraska, Choji Murata, Japanese professional baseball pitcher (1968–1990), mainly Lotte Orions (present day, Chiba Lotte Marines), in Hongō, (now Mihara), Hiroshima Prefecture, Japan. (d. 2022)
- Died: Vincenzo Irolli, 89, Italian painter

== November 28, 1949 (Monday) ==
- Princess Eugénie of Greece and Austrian Prince Raimundo, 2nd Duke of Castel Duino were married in Athens.
- Winston Churchill proposed during a speech at Kingsway Hall that the British government discuss with other Commonwealth countries the possibility of Britain joining a European union, declaring that "no time must be lost in discussing the question with the Dominions and seeking to convince them that their interests as well as ours lie in a United Europe."
- Born: Alexander Godunov, ballet dancer and actor, in Sakhalin, USSR (d. 1995); Paul Shaffer, musician, band leader and television personality, in Fort William, Ontario, Canada

== November 29, 1949 (Tuesday) ==
- American Airlines Flight 157: A Douglas DC-6 en route from New York City to Mexico City crashed during the final approach to a routine stopover at Love Field in Dallas, Texas, killing 28 of the 41 aboard.
- The Cominform issued a bulletin calling for the overthrow of Marshal Tito's regime in Yugoslavia.
- Notre Dame end Leon Hart won the Heisman Trophy.
- Born: Jerry Lawler, professional wrestler and color commentator, in West Memphis, Arkansas; Stan Rogers, folk musician and songwriter, in Hamilton, Ontario, Canada (d. 1983); Garry Shandling, stand-up comedian, actor, writer and producer, in Chicago, Illinois (d. 2016)

== November 30, 1949 (Wednesday) ==
- Chongqing fell to Communist Chinese forces.
- A general election was held in New Zealand. The incumbent Labour Party was defeated by the opposition National Party.
- Roy Sievers of the St. Louis Browns and Don Newcombe of the Brooklyn Dodgers were named the winners of the Major League Baseball Rookie of the Year Award for the American League and National League, respectively. This was the first year that the award was given to one player in each league.
- Died: Irene Vanbrugh, 76, English actress
