= Puget Sound fishermen's strike of 1949 =

Puget Sound fishermen's strike of 1949 was a labor strike by fishermen in the Pacific Northwest.

== Background ==
The Pacific Northwest has an abundance of natural resources and beauty. One of those resources, fish, has a lot of meaning to the working-class people of the area. The fishing industry is special in the fact that its successes and failures are directly connected to the natural cycle of the fish and the pressures that mass profiting can put on that cycle. With that being said, fishing is a much regulated industry. In the years after World War II the fishing industry employed between 33,000 and 50,000 fishers on 11,000 to 14,000 boats and these fishers sold their fish to 500 to 700 processors across the Pacific Northwest coast. The fishermen's catch and distribution of the fish caught was concentrated in major ports that included cities such as San Francisco, Astoria, Seattle, and Bristol Bay (Alaska).

As with many working class labor industries in the early half of the 20th century, the fishing industry was rife with labor unions. The International Fishermen and Allied Workers of America (IFAWA), a Pacific Coast trade union, was one of them. The IFAWA had a very short lived life, and is not well known, talked, or written about. The IFAWA came to be in May 1939 and consisted of six combined fishing unions, was affiliated with the Congress of Industrial Organizations (CIO), and represented fishery workers in the states of California, Oregon, Washington, and Alaska. The union represented fishery workers from every part of the fishing process, from the fishermen catching the fish all the way to the workers that canned the fish in canneries.

The decisions and rulings laid down from Office of Price Administration (OPA) and the Federal Trade Commission (FTC), during and after World War II, had direct effect on the fishing industry in the Pacific Northwest and the IFAWA. The OPA had set price ceilings for fish caught during World War II and the FTC's anti-monopoly division concluded that the IFAWA was a group of businesspersons concluding to raise the prices of the fish that they sold. The IFAWA needed more power and backing to fight these rulings. With the IFAWA reaching over 22,000 members after World War II, they merged with the International Longshore and Warehouse Union (ILWU) and became a division of the ILWU in January 1949. The merger made sense because the ILWU and IFAWA were both based within the same ports and cities. Joseph Jurich was made head of the fishermen's union of the IFAWA division within the ILWU, which was headed by Harry Bridges.

== Tie-ups in 1949 ==
The price that packers, or distributors, of fish were willing to pay to fishermen for catching them was at the forefront of the IFAWA's mind and decision making in every year. However, in 1949 the negotiations between the IFAWA and the packers reached a breaking point. This breaking point came to be in the Puget Sound area of Washington state. Strikes and 'tie-ups' would be littered throughout the entire year of 1949 in the area, and came during every fishing season that year. The negotiations between the packers and the IFAWA on the prices would happen before the season started and lasted until the IFAWA was satisfied with the offer.

From March to June in 1949 the Puget Sound area fishermen and IFAWA decide to oppose the packers offer for what they would pay for herring. They never came to a full agreement on a price and only 125 out of 500 fishermen would contribute their services that year after a limited deal was reached in Alaska. These holdouts would continue throughout the year, as disagreement between the parties came at every new fishing season. The biggest of these would be during the salmon runs.

During this time in 1949 there were two separate salmon fishing seasons, one from July to late September and another from October to November. In June and July the salmon fishermen, tendermen, and canners all elected to vote down offers from the packers. Bob Cummings, secretary of Local 3 of the IFAWA reported to the Seattle Times that the offer of 18 cents per pound for sockeye salmon and 8 cents for pink salmon from the Columbia Rivers Packers' Association was rejected; the fishermen wanted 30 cents, the same as the previous year, for sockeye and 16 cents for pinks, compared to 12 cents last year. Also during July there was a tie-up, lasting 23 days, on the Columbia River and short strike by the Alaska Fishermen's Union, a member of the IFAWA, against the Alaskan Salmon Industry.

== All out Strike, 1949 ==
The tie-ups and strikes carried over into the fall salmon runs in the Puget Sound area. The major strike came during October at 4 am on Wednesday October 5th, 1949 the IFAWA voted to go on strike against the packers, who were offering 8 cents per pound for dog salmon and 15 cents per pound for silvers, the IFAWA, according to Bob Cummings wanted 14 and 20 cents respectively. The offer by the packers was a decrease of over 22% from the previous year and picket committees were formed in the cities of Seattle, Tacoma, Gig Harbor, Anacortes, Everett, and Bellingham. This was the first time the IFAWA had chosen to go on an all out strike.

It's estimated more than 2,000 workers participated in the strike.

For the average wage earning fisherman the strike was difficult. The main point of the strike was for the average fishermen to earn a higher wage in the long-term, and they saw $50 fines for not participating in picket line duty. The average fisherman in 1949 made only a few thousand of dollars a year and made most of those dollars during only certain parts of the year, so when the IFAWA chose to go on strike they either had to join or get evicted from the union. Since the canneries were also a part of the IFAWA the fishermen with boats of their own could not even sell fish they caught during the strike because they were not running. The strike carried on however.

On October 12, Bob Cummings reported to the Seattle Times that the IFAWA had rejected another offer from the packers but they were open to negotiations. There were many minor negotiations and disputes settled throughout October 1949, between packers and local fishermen of IFAWA in the Puget Sound but the strike carried on into the depths of fall. By the end of October and into late November, the end of the salmon runs, many of the major packers began to give in including the Whiz Fish Company, Washington Fish and Oyster Co., and Farwest. A pact was reach on October 27 according to the Seattle Times via Bob Cummings, and less the one third of the normal fishing fleet was dispatched to fish for the rest of the fishing season that ended on November 20.

== Aftermath ==
Overall the strike of 1949 in the Pacific Northwest was a success for the fishermen. The Local 3, a part of the IFAWA, in the Puget Sound was at the height of its membership at the time but overall after the strike the union was low on resources and combined with the ILWU. The imports of Canadian fishermen at this time were a big hit to the IFAWA and the packers now had more reasons to reject their offers in future years on prices for fish. The IFAWA was all but disbanded by 1957 and hardly anything has been heard of them since. The fishermen of the Puget Sound were fighting for a "living wage" and received it but it was lost in the wash with the combining of the ILWU and IFAWA, however the strike of 1949 deserves its place in history.
