= Jindřich Bišický =

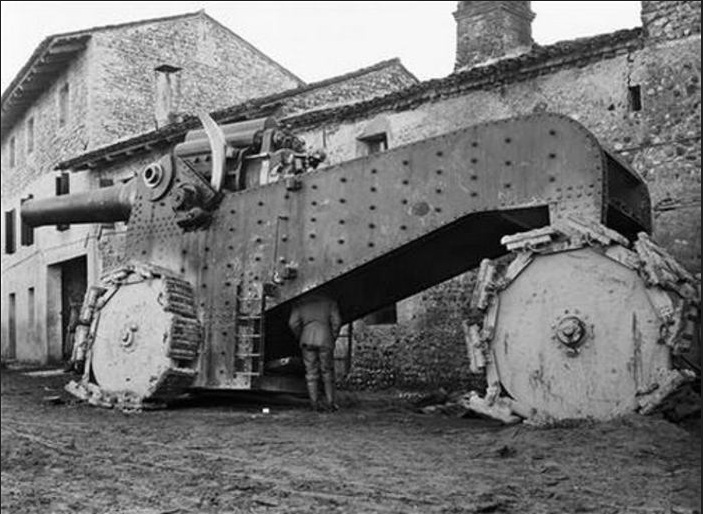
A photo by Bišický: Italian Obice da 305/17 modello 16 howitzer on a siege carriage with footed wheels, captured by Austrians in a village near Udine.

Jindřich Bišický (11 February 1889 – 31 October 1949) was a Czech photographer. He is known as the author of unique photographs from World War I. He was not properly identified until 2009.

== Early life ==
Jindřich Bišický was born in Zeměchy (now part of Kralupy nad Vltavou), Bohemia, Austria-Hungary on 11 February 1889. After apprenticeship as a bricklayer, he studied technical school in Prague-Smíchov with 1906 practice in Drohobycz (Galicia), in the reconstruction of an oil refinery. His mandatory 10-month-long military service was in Trient, as a military sketcher.

== Military photography ==
At the beginning of World War I Bišický was drafted into the Austrian Infantry regiment No. 47 in Graz and became a member of the staff and the regimental photographer. The regiment first fought on the Eastern Front, in Galicia; in 1915 it moved to the Italian Front and stayed there until the end of war. Lieutenant (and later Captain) Bišický took hundreds of photographs of the life in the trenches, using the ICA Ideal camera.

== Death ==
One year before the end of the war, while on leave, Bišický married Zdenka Pekárková. After the war, the family moved to Velvary and Bišický worked as building contractor until his death by stomach cancer. He died in Velvary on 31 October 1949.

== Restoration of photographs ==
Bišický's negatives, many on glass, were lent away and lost. During the 1970s they were obtained, unrecognized, by photographer Jaroslav Kučera (1949). In 2002 Kučera started to restore them, and, with the help of historians, identified many locations and events. The author remained unknown. In 2009 the photos were exhibited in the Prague Castle and only then recognized by the photographer's grandson, historian Michal Rybák.

== Literature ==
- Ludwig von Vogelsang: Das steierische Infanterieregiment Nr 47 im Weltkrieg, Leykam-Verlag, Graz, 1932. The book about the history of the 47th infantry regiment, written by regimental historian and descendant of Ludwig von Vogelsang (1748–1822), owner of the regiment. The book contains about 200 photos by Jindřich Bišický.
