= Charles Arthur Collingwood =

British barrister and High Court judge

Sir Charles Arthur Collingwood (2 November 1887 – 23 May 1964) was a British barrister and High Court judge who sat in the Probate, Divorce and Admiralty Division from 1950 to 1962.

Educated at Exeter School and Downing College, Cambridge, where he graduated MA and LLB. Collingwood was called to the bar by Lincoln's Inn in 1912. He practiced at the common law bar and joined the South-Eastern Circuit. During the First World War, he served with the Northumberland Fusiliers. Returning to the bar after the war, he joined the chambers of Sir Ellis Hume-Williams KC at 3 Hare Court. He acquired a good practice both in the High Court and in the county courts. During the Second World War, he joined the staff of the Judge Advocate-General and served as Assistant Judge Advocate-General from 1943 to 1945.

In 1945, Collingwood was appointed a County Court judge. In 1949, he was deputed as judge advocate for the court-martial of Erich von Manstein, who was being tried for war crimes. In 1950, he was appointed a Justice of the High Court, receiving the customary knighthood, and was elected an honorary fellow of Downing College, Cambridge the same year. Assigned to the Probate, Divorce and Admiralty Division, he retired from the bench in 1962 on health grounds. After a long illness, he died two years later.

Collingwood married Angela, daughter of E. R. Longcroft, of Hall Place, Havant, Hampshire, in 1918; Lady Collingwood died in 1974.
