= Trial of Erich von Manstein =

Trial of a Nazi military commander in Germany

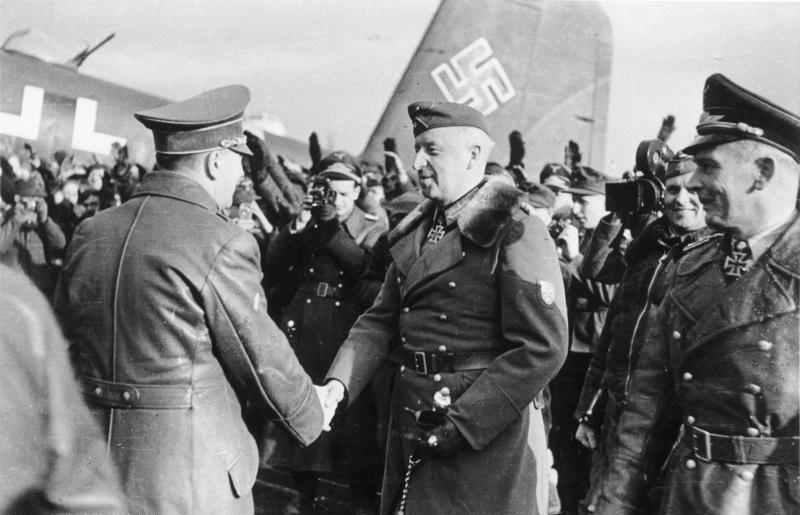
Manstein (centre) with Adolf Hitler in the Soviet Union, 1943

Erich von Manstein (24 November 1887 – 9 June 1973) was a prominent commander of Nazi Germany's World War II army (Heer). In 1949, he was tried for war crimes in Hamburg, was convicted of nine of seventeen charges and sentenced to eighteen years in prison. He served only four years before being released.

Manstein was taken prisoner by the British in August 1945. He testified for the defence of the German General Staff and the Wehrmacht supreme command (the OKW), on trial at the Nuremberg trials of major Nazi war criminals and organisations in August 1946. Under pressure from the Soviet Union, the British cabinet decided in July 1948 to prosecute Manstein and several other senior officers who had been held in custody since the end of the war.

Manstein's trial was held in Hamburg from 23 August to 19 December 1949. He faced seventeen charges covering activities such as authorising or permitting the killing, deportation, and maltreatment of Jews and other civilians; maltreating and killing prisoners of war; illegally compelling prisoners to do dangerous work and work of a military nature; ordering the execution of Soviet political commissars in compliance with Hitler's Commissar Order; and issuing scorched earth orders while in retreat in the Crimea.

Manstein was found guilty on nine of the charges and was sentenced to eighteen years in prison. His early release on 7 May 1953 was partly because of recurring health problems, but also the result of pressure by Winston Churchill, Konrad Adenauer, B. H. Liddell Hart, and other supporters. The conduct of the trial was partly responsible for creating the myth of the clean Wehrmacht – the belief that members of the German armed forces acted in isolation, and were not involved or culpable for the events of the Holocaust.

== Background ==
Erich von Manstein, a career military officer, earned the rank of field marshal in 1942 after the successful Siege of Sevastopol. Germany's fortunes in the war began to take an unfavourable turn after the disastrous Battle of Stalingrad, where Manstein commanded a failed relief effort. He was one of the primary commanders at the Battle of Kursk, one of the last major battles of the war and one of the largest battles in history. Ongoing disagreements with Adolf Hitler over the conduct of the war led to Manstein's dismissal in March 1944. He never obtained another command and was taken prisoner by the British in August 1945, several months after Germany's defeat. Initially held in a prisoner of war camp at Lüneburg, Manstein was transferred to Nuremberg in October 1945 to give evidence for the defence of the German General Staff and the Wehrmacht supreme command (the OKW), on trial at the Nuremberg trials of major Nazi war criminals and organisations.

== Testimony at Nuremberg ==
In addition to providing oral testimony, Manstein helped prepare a 132-page document presented at Nuremberg in August 1946. The myth that the Wehrmacht was "clean"—not culpable for the events of the Holocaust—arose partly as a result of this document, written largely by Manstein, along with General of Cavalry Siegfried Westphal. Manstein's oral testimony included material about the Einsatzgruppen, the treatment of prisoners of war, and the concept of military obedience, especially as related to the Commissar Order, an order issued by Hitler in 1941 requiring all Soviet political commissars to be shot without trial. Manstein admitted that he received the order, but said he did not carry it out. Documents from 1941 presented at Nuremberg and at Manstein's own later trial contradict this claim: he received regular reports throughout that summer regarding the execution of hundreds of political commissars. He denied any knowledge of the activities of the Einsatzgruppen, and testified that soldiers under his command were not involved in the murder of Jewish civilians. Otto Ohlendorf, commander of Einsatzgruppe D, contradicted this during his own testimony, saying that not only was Manstein aware of what was happening, but that Manstein's Eleventh Army was actively involved. While testifying at Nuremberg, Manstein claimed ignorance of what was happening in the concentration camps. He stated that as he was a thousand kilometres away, he knew little about what was occurring there. One of his officers who had visited a camp had reported to him that the prisoners were criminals and political prisoners, who were being treated "severely but correctly." In September 1946, the General Staff and the OKW were declared to not be a criminal organization. Their decision was that a collection of military officers was not a group or organization as defined by article 9 of their charter.

After his testimony at Nuremberg, Manstein was interned by the British as a prisoner of war at Island Farm (also known as Special Camp 11) in Bridgend, Wales, where he awaited the decision as to whether or not he would face a war crimes trial. He mostly kept apart from the other inmates, taking solitary walks, tending a small garden, and beginning work on the drafts of two books. British author B. H. Liddell Hart was in correspondence with Manstein and others at Island Farm and visited inmates of several camps around Britain while preparing his best-selling 1947 book On the Other Side of the Hill. Liddell Hart was an admirer of the German generals; he described Manstein as an operational genius. The two remained in contact, and Liddell Hart later helped Manstein arrange the publication of the English edition of his memoir, Verlorene Siege (Lost Victories), in 1958.

The British cabinet (Attlee ministry), under pressure from the Soviet Union, finally decided in July 1948 to prosecute Manstein and three other senior officers—Walther von Brauchitsch, Gerd von Rundstedt, and Adolf Strauss—who had all been held in custody since the end of the war. Telford Taylor, recently promoted to Brigadier General and placed in charge of prosecuting war criminals on behalf of the United States, had during the course of the main Nuremberg trials collected a body of evidence against the four generals, falling into three broad categories: the killing of political commissars in the Soviet Union; poor treatment and killing of prisoners of war; and the extermination and enslavement of civilian populations. He filed a memorandum with the British public prosecutor, which was passed on to the War Ministry. Discussion among British cabinet ministers was heated; the Cold War was already under way, and Germany was seen as a bulwark against the spread of communism. While General Sir Brian Robertson, posted in Berlin, favoured discontinuing the prosecution of German generals as a way to initiate reconciliation with Germany, others, such as Foreign Affairs Minister Ernest Bevin and Minister of War Emanuel Shinwell, felt that the evidence was so convincing that a case must be filed. The Soviet Union requested in March 1948 that Manstein and Rundstedt be turned over for trial in that country, but the request was turned down. In July 1948, the decision was taken by the British cabinet to try the men on German soil, and they were transferred to Munsterlager to await trial. In October Winston Churchill, then Leader of the Opposition, spoke out against prosecuting any further German generals, as he felt it would interfere with the process of reconciliation with Germany. Brauchitsch died that month, and Rundstedt and Strauss were released on medical grounds in March 1949.

== Charges laid ==
Manstein faced seventeen charges, three of which pertained to events in Poland and fourteen regarding events in the Soviet Union. The first charge covered twenty-three counts of authorising or permitting the killing, deportation, and maltreatment of Jews and other Polish civilians, actions which had been undertaken by the Schutzstaffel (SS), the Sicherheitsdienst (SD), army units, and police units. The second charge accused him of deliberately failing to prevent such killings and maltreatment. The third charge covered six counts of maltreatment and killing of Polish prisoners of war. The charges regarding events in the Soviet Union included the fourth charge, fourteen counts of failing to attend to the needs of Soviet prisoners of war; many died through maltreatment or were executed by the SD. The fifth charge regarded an order issued by Manstein on 20 September 1941 whereby captured Soviet soldiers were summarily killed without trial; eight counts were included in this charge. The sixth charge claimed three counts of captured Soviet soldiers being illegally recruited into German armed forces units. The seventh charge claimed that Soviet prisoners of war were illegally compelled to do dangerous work, and work of a military nature, which is prohibited by the Hague Convention. Sixteen counts were filed under this charge. The eighth charge included fifteen counts of Soviet political commissars being executed in compliance with Hitler's Commissar Order.

The remaining charges were related to the activities of Einsatzgruppe D in the Crimea. The ninth charge accused Manstein of twenty-three counts of authorising the execution of Jews and other Soviet citizens. The tenth charge accused him of failing to protect the lives of the civilians in the area. The eleventh charge claimed seventeen counts of soldiers in units commanded by Manstein handing over civilians to the Einsatzgruppe, while knowing that to do so would mean their deaths. The twelfth charge accused Manstein of seven counts of authorising his troops to kill Jewish civilians in the Crimea. The thirteenth charge accused Manstein of authorising the killing of civilians for offences which they did not commit. The fourteenth charge accused Manstein of six counts of issuing orders to execute civilians without trial; for merely being suspects; and for having committed offences that did not warrant the death penalty. The fifteenth charge was that Soviet citizens, in violation of the Hague Convention, had been compelled to build defensive positions and dig trenches in combat areas. This charge included twenty-five counts. The sixteenth charge accused him of fourteen counts of ordering the deportation of civilians as slave labourers. The final charge accused Manstein of thirteen counts of issuing scorched earth orders while in retreat, while ordering the deportation of the civilians in the affected areas.

== Trial ==
Manstein's trial was held in Hamburg from 23 August to 19 December 1949. The trial was conducted as a British general court martial. Lieutenant General Frank Simpson served as president of the panel, which included six other officers of various ranks. Charles Arthur Collingwood served as Judge Advocate. Reginald Thomas Paget KC, barrister and Labour MP, served as lead defence counsel. The trial began its first day with Collingwood reading out the charges, and senior prosecutor Arthur Comyns Carr spent the next two days reiterating the charges and summarising the evidence to be presented for each charge.

=== Prosecution ===
The prosecution, led by senior counsel Carr, took twenty days to present their evidence in court. Carr asserted that Manstein knew it was Hitler's plan right from the start to exterminate the Jews of Europe during the course of the war, and that Manstein did nothing to prevent it, and that he permitted it to continue. As at Nuremberg, Manstein was presented with an order he had signed on 20 November 1941 which had been drafted based on the Severity Order issued by Field Marshal Walther von Reichenau on 10 October 1941. Manstein claimed in court that he remembered asking for a draft of such an order, but had no recollection of signing it. The order called for the elimination of the "Jewish Bolshevik system" and the "harsh punishment of Jewry". The prosecution used this order to build their case that Manstein had known about and was complicit with the genocide.

Within the scope of the first three charges, which covered events in Poland while Manstein was chief of staff of an army group, were some 1,209 deaths, including 22 Jews who were killed in the town square in Końskie on 12 September 1939. Carr gave details of the deportation of Jews across the River San, during which many people drowned or were shot by members of the Gestapo; Carr presented evidence that Manstein had specifically ordered that the refugees should be prevented from re-crossing the river.

The remaining charges covered events that happened in the Soviet Union, after Manstein had been promoted to commanding general. The fourth charge consisted of eleven counts of failure to protect the lives and ensure the humane treatment of prisoners of war; the prosecution presented evidence that 7,393 people died as a result of maltreatment or were shot dead. Carr presented evidence that the High Command had ordered these actions, and that Manstein carried out said orders. The fifth charge included eight counts of illegally treating captured Soviet soldiers as though they were partisans or terrorists, and alleged that many were killed as a result of orders issued by the High Command and Manstein's own order of 20 September 1941.

The next group of charges pertained to the activities of Einsatzgruppe D, a unit not under Manstein's direct control but operating in his zone of command. These charges became one of the key points of the trial, as the prosecution argued that it was Manstein's duty to know about the activities of this unit and his duty to put a stop to their genocidal operations. The ninth charge included twenty-three counts of ordering and permitting the killing of Jews, Gypsies, and other civilians in Russia by Einsatzgruppe D. Evidence was presented of the deaths of 22,467 Jews in September and 21,185 more in November 1941. The tenth charge alleged that Manstein deliberately ignored his duty to protect the lives of civilians in the areas where his troops were operating, and the eleventh charge detailed seventeen cases where Manstein's troops turned civilians over to the Einsatzgruppe, while knowing full well that to do so would mean their deaths. Carr gave details of the organisation and activities of the Einsatzgruppen, and alleged that Manstein must have known "from start to finish" what was going on, and had assisted them in their activities, in violation of human decency and the Hague Convention.

The twelfth charge included seven counts where Manstein was accused of ordering his own troops, as opposed to the Einsatzgruppen, to kill Jews; one charge claimed he had ordered his troops to kill some 2,500 Jewish citizens of Kertsch in December 1941, and to return the following June to kill any Jews still living there. The thirteenth charge alleged that Manstein had allowed civilians to be killed for offences they had not committed. The six counts under this charge included the deaths of 1,300 civilians in January 1942. For the seventeenth charge, the prosecution gave a description of the scorched earth tactics allegedly ordered by Manstein, orders that included the deportation of all the civilians and their livestock and the destruction of houses and any other objects of economic importance that could not be brought along. Carr described how the population was driven for hundreds of miles while lacking adequate food and clothing, resulting in uncounted deaths.

=== Defence ===
Theodor Busse, formerly Manstein's Chief of Operations while serving with the 11th Army, worked with Manstein and his lawyers throughout the preparations for the trial, helping recruit witnesses for the defence. Funds totalling £2,000 were raised by public subscription; donors included Winston Churchill. The defence argued that Manstein was not compelled to disobey orders given by his sovereign government, even if such orders were illegal. Paget claimed that the only commissars Manstein had ordered shot were in the rear area in the Crimea, likely because of partisan activities. Manstein, speaking in his own defence, stated that he found the Nazi racial policy to be repugnant. Sixteen other witnesses were called for the defence, several of whom were members of his staff, who testified that Manstein had no knowledge of or involvement in the genocide. Manstein himself said he had not received any reports of Jews being shot. When asked about his involvement in the crimes of the Einsatzgruppen, Manstein replied:

The task of the Einsatzgruppen, to my knowledge, was the preparation of the political administration which included political supervision of the population of in the occupied territories in the East. They worked under special orders and were Himmler's responsibility.

Sixteen witnesses testified on Manstein's behalf. His quartermaster, Colonel Friedrich-Wilhelm Hauck, and Generalleutnant Konrad Stephanus, who had served as his head of anti-partisan operations, testified that Manstein did not have any knowledge of or involvement in the killing of Jews. Hauck testified in camera that he himself had been personally responsible for arranging for logistical support for the SD in the Crimea, and that Manstein was not involved.

In his closing address, Paget minimised the contributions of the military elite to the decision-making process regarding the conduct of the war, and characterised the charges of atrocities as Soviet propaganda. He emphasised that Manstein believed he was duty bound to obey orders, questioned whether or not the Hague Convention applied to Russia (the Soviets were not signatories to the convention), and denied that Manstein was responsible for war crimes. He called Manstein a victim of "victor's justice", and asked for his acquittal.

== Summation and verdict ==
After an adjournment of three weeks, Collingwood presented his summation on 12–16 December 1949. He said that perpetrators of war crimes could not be absolved of guilt by claiming that they were only following orders when such orders were unlawful under international law. He stated that it was immaterial whether or not Manstein was aware of the mass killings in his area; he should have known, and he should have tried to put a stop to it. He remarked that the testimony of Manstein's fellow soldiers was not corroborated by independent observers, and thus should not be relied upon too heavily. Regarding Manstein's use of the scorched earth tactic, Collingwood pointed out that it was not done out of any military necessity, but had been planned and ordered well in advance. The court adjourned until 19 December to consider the verdict.

Manstein was found guilty on nine of the charges. He was found not guilty on the three charges relating to Poland. He was also found not guilty on the three charges relating to the extermination of the Jews, but was found culpable for failing to ensure the safety of civilians within his zone of command by issuing scorched earth orders. He was found guilty of allowing the deportation of civilians for slave labour, for using Soviet prisoners of war to construct fortifications, for the execution of commissars, for the poor treatment and deaths of prisoners of war, and for the execution of civilians. He was sentenced to eighteen years in prison.

== Aftermath ==
An uproar ensued among Manstein's supporters both in Great Britain and in Germany. Liddell Hart lobbied in the British press, and in Germany the sentence was seen as a political decision. The sentence was reduced to 12 years in February 1950. Paget published a best-selling book in 1951 about Manstein's career and trial, which described Manstein as an honourable soldier fighting heroically despite overwhelming odds on the Eastern Front, and who had been convicted of crimes that he did not commit. The book helped to contribute to the growing cult surrounding Manstein's name. His release on 7 May 1953 was partly a result of a recurrence of his eye problems, but also the result of pressure by Churchill, Konrad Adenauer, Liddell Hart, Paget, and other supporters.

Along with the material in Manstein's memoirs and the memoirs of other German generals, the conduct of the trial was partly responsible for creating the legend of a "clean" Wehrmacht, the myth that members of the German armed forces acted in isolation, and were not involved or culpable for the events of the Holocaust. Modern researchers, including Benoît Lemay, find that Manstein tacitly accepted the actions of the Einsatzgruppen, and did nothing to prevent their activities. In Manstein's obituary, Spiegel magazine said, "He assisted in the march to catastrophe—misled by a blind sense of duty."

== Sources ==
- Evans, Richard J. (2008). The Third Reich at War. New York: Penguin Group. ISBN 978-0-14-311671-4.
- "Judgment of International Military Tribunal: The Accused Organizations". The Avalon Project. New Haven, Connecticut: Yale Law School, Lillian Goldman Law Library. 30 September 1946.
- Lemay, Benoît (2010). Erich von Manstein: Hitler's Master Strategist. Heyward, Pierce (trans.). Havertown, PA; Newbury, Berkshire: Casemate. ISBN 978-1-935149-26-2.
- Melvin, Mungo (2010). Manstein: Hitler's Greatest General. London: Weidenfeld & Nicolson. ISBN 978-0-297-84561-4.
- "Nuremberg Trial Proceedings". Lillian Goldman Law Library, Yale Law School: Avalon Project. 10 August 1946. p. 615.
- Paget, Baron Reginald Thomas (1952). Manstein: Seine Feldzüge und sein Prozess (in German). Wiesbaden: Limes Verlag. OCLC 16731799.
- Smelser, Ronald; Davies, Edward (2008). The Myth of the Eastern Front: The Nazi-Soviet War in American Popular Culture. Cambridge: Cambridge University Press. ISBN 978-0-521-71231-6.
- Knopp, Guido (creator, director) (1998). Hitler's Warriors: The Strategist (television documentary). Germany: ZDF.
