= November 1948 =

Month of 1948

<<	November 1948					>>
Su	Mo	Tu	We	Th	Fr	Sa
	1	2	3	4	5	6
7	8	9	10	11	12	13
14	15	16	17	18	19	20
21	22	23	24	25	26	27
28	29	30

The following events occurred in November 1948:

November 15-1948 Srilankan (Then Ceylon) revoked nearly 800,000 Indian origin Tamil’s citizenship

== November 1, 1948 (Monday) ==
- Manuel A. Odría became President of Peru.
- Athenagoras I became 268th Ecumenical Patriarch of Constantinople.
- A boiler and ammunition explosion aboard a merchant ship evacuating troops of the Republic of China Army from Yingkou, China for Taiwan caused thousands of deaths.
- The Foley Square trial of Eugene Dennis and ten other CPUSA leaders began in New York City.
- Born: Anna Stuart, actress, in Bluefield, West Virginia
- In fiction: The Dering Woods Massacre, Pluckley, Kent, England.

== November 2, 1948 (Tuesday) ==
- The 1948 United States presidential election was held. Incumbent Democrat Harry S. Truman defeated Republican Thomas E. Dewey in one of the most surprising results in American history, as almost every pre-election forecast indicated that Truman would be defeated.
- The Liaoshen Campaign ended in Communist victory. All of Manchuria fell to the Communists.
- Kansas voted to repeal its sixty-eight year prohibition on the manufacture and sale of alcohol.
- A six-question referendum on councils and treasury was held in the United States Virgin Islands.

== November 3, 1948 (Wednesday) ==
- The Chicago Tribune published the erroneous front-page headline "Dewey Defeats Truman" based on early election returns. Two days later, President Truman made a public appearance in St. Louis where he posed for photographs while holding up a copy of the infamous issue, immortalizing the mistake.
- The UN General Assembly approved a resolution by unanimous vote urging the Big Five powers to settle their differences and establish lasting peace.
- The 2nd National Hockey League All-Star Game was played at Chicago Stadium. A team of NHL all-stars defeated the Toronto Maple Leafs 3-1.
- Born: Lulu, pop singer and songwriter, as Marie Lawrie in Lennoxtown, Scotland
- Died: Isabel Weld Perkins, 72, American heiress and author

== November 4, 1948 (Thursday) ==
- The United Nations passed Security Council Resolution 61, calling on Egypt and Israel to withdraw their troops to positions occupied in the Negev on October 14 before fighting broke out there.
- The drama film The Snake Pit starring Olivia de Havilland and Mark Stevens premiered in New York City.
- Born: Delia Casanova, actress, in Poza Rica, Mexico; Amadou Toumani Touré, President of Mali 2002–2012, in Mopti, French Sudan (d. 2020)
- Died: Jake Powell, 40, American baseball player (suicide); Albert Stanley, 1st Baron Ashfield, 74, British-American businessman and Chairman of the Underground Electric Railways Company of London 1910–33

== November 5, 1948 (Friday) ==
- Italy and Greece signed a treaty of friendship, commerce and navigation.
- Leni Riefenstahl was cleared by a German denazification court, much to the displeasure of the German press which complained that the film director had gotten off lightly. The decision would be appealed and Riefenstahl would have to go through the process three more times until finally being cleared for good in 1952.
- Born: Bob Barr, politician, in Iowa City, Iowa; Charles Bradley, singer, in Gainesville, Florida (d. 2017); Dallas Holm, Christian musician, in St. Paul Park, Minnesota; William Daniel Phillips, physicist and Nobel Prize laureate, in Wilkes-Barre, Pennsylvania

== November 6, 1948 (Saturday) ==
- The Huaihai Campaign began during the Chinese Civil War.
- "Buttons and Bows" by Dinah Shore topped the Billboard singles charts.
- Born: Glenn Frey, singer, songwriter, actor and founding member of rock band The Eagles, in Detroit, Michigan (d. 2016)

== November 7, 1948 (Sunday) ==
- The anthology drama series Westinghouse Studio One made the jump from radio to television, premiering on CBS. The show would be very successful, airing a total of 467 episodes over its decade-long run.
- The Young Lions by Irwin Shaw topped The New York Times Fiction Best Seller list.
- Born: Jim Houghton, actor and writer, in Los Angeles, California; Buck Martinez, baseball player, manager and sportscaster, in Redding, California

== November 8, 1948 (Monday) ==
- Nathuram Godse read a 30,000-word statement in Indian court confessing to the assassination of Mahatma Gandhi and explaining his motivation. Godse said that while he admired some of Gandhi's work, he considered him responsible for the creation of Pakistan and believed that the Gandhi policy of non-violence would make it easier for Pakistanis to occupy India.

== November 9, 1948 (Tuesday) ==
- Israeli forces carried out Operation Shmone, successfully capturing the Egyptian-held police fort of Iraq Suwaydan.
- Mohammad Sa'ed became Prime Minister of Iran.
- Born: Luiz Felipe Scolari, footballer and manager, in Passo Fundo, Brazil
- Died: Edgar Kennedy, 58, American comedic actor

== November 10, 1948 (Wednesday) ==
- The Chinese Nationalist government imposed martial law on Nanjing and Shanghai to put down food rioting.
- The International Military Tribunal for the Far East declared Japan guilty of waging a war of aggression against the United States, the British Commonwealth, the Netherlands and France.
- Died: Julius Curtius, 71, German politician

== November 11, 1948 (Thursday) ==
- At the United Nations in Paris, Chinese delegate Tsiang Tingfu claimed that 50,000 Japanese prisoners of war had been armed by the Soviets and were being sent into battle on the side of the Communists in the Civil War. Soviet Deputy Foreign Minister Andrey Vyshinsky called the accusation "dirty slander".
- The epic historical film Joan of Arc starring Ingrid Bergman premiered in New York City.
- Born: Robert John "Mutt" Lange, record producer and songwriter, in Mufulira, Northern Rhodesia; Dušan Prelević, singer, journalist and writer, in Belgrade, Yugoslavia (d. 2007); Vincent Schiavelli, actor and food writer, in Brooklyn, New York (d. 2005)
- Died: Fred Niblo, 74, American actor and filmmaker

== November 12, 1948 (Friday) ==
- Hideki Tojo and his twenty-four co-defendants were convicted of war crimes by the International Military Tribunal for the Far East. Tojo and six others were sentenced to death by hanging while sixteen others received life in prison.
- Born: Richard Roberts, evangelist and son of Oral Roberts, in Tulsa, Oklahoma; Hassan Rouhani, 7th President of Iran, in Sorkheh, Iran

== November 13, 1948 (Saturday) ==
- Riots broke out in several Paris suburbs in connection with a one-day Communist-ordered general strike. 30 policemen and many rioters were injured while a number of union leaders were arrested for trying to prevent non-strikers from working.
- In a paper presented to the British Interplanetary Society, H. E. Ross described a crewed satellite station in Earth orbit that would serve as an astronomical and zero-gravity and vacuum research laboratory. (Ross' bold suggestions also included schemes for a crewed landing on the Moon and return to Earth through use of the rendezvous technique in Earth orbit and about the Moon.) Ross' suggested design comprised a circular structure that housed the crew of the space laboratory (numbering 24 specialists and support personnel) as well as telescopes and research equipment. The station, he suggested, could be resupplied with oxygen and other life-support essentials by supply ships launched every three months.
- Born: Humayun Ahmed, writer, dramatist, screenwriter and filmmaker, in Mohanganj, East Bengal (d. 2012); Robert Ginty, actor, producer and director, in Brooklyn, New York (d. 2009); Lockwood Smith, politician, in Paparoa, New Zealand

== November 14, 1948 (Sunday) ==
- Buckingham Palace released an official proclamation at 10:10 p.m. that read in full: "Her Royal Highness the Princess Elizabeth Duchess of Edinburgh was safely delivered of a Prince at 9:14 o'clock this evening. Her Royal Highness and the infant Prince are both well." Crowds that had gathered outside the palace all weekend long waiting for the news rejoiced into the early morning, while celebrations were more subdued elsewhere because of the late hour.
- Actress Claire Trevor married her third husband, producer Milton H. Bren.
- Born: King Charles III of the United Kingdom, at Buckingham Palace, London, England; Michael Dobbs, politician and novelist, in Cheshunt, England

== November 15, 1948 (Monday) ==
- The Battle of Jiulianshan began in the Chinese Civil War.
- The Lynskey tribunal opened in London, investigating allegations of bribery and corruption within the British government.
- Louis St. Laurent became 12th Prime Minister of Canada.
- Born: James Kemsley, cartoonist, in Sydney, Australia (d. 2007)

== November 16, 1948 (Tuesday) ==
- The University of Los Andes was founded in Colombia.
- The heavy cruiser USS Des Moines entered commission.
- Born: Bonnie Greer, playwright, novelist, critic and broadcaster, in Chicago, Illinois; Mate Parlov, boxer, in Split, Yugoslavia (d. 2008)
- Died: Frederick Gardner Cottrell, 71, American physical chemist, inventor and philanthropist

== November 17, 1948 (Wednesday) ==
- By a vote of 373-211, the British House of Commons approved the Labour government's bill to nationalize the iron and steel industry.
- Russian authorities tightened control over East Berlin by announcing distribution of new identity cards for residents starting December 1.
- King Farouk of Egypt divorced his wife Farida for failing to bear a son.
- Born: Howard Dean, politician, in East Hampton, New York

== November 18, 1948 (Thursday) ==
- US Economic Cooperation Administration head Paul G. Hoffman announced that his department was taking emergency measures to provide food assistance for 11 million Chinese.

== November 19, 1948 (Friday) ==
- In Paris, 47 countries signed a protocol establishing international control over the manufacture and distribution of all potentially addictive drugs.
- The 1949 Sun Bowl controversy began when the Lafayette Leopards college football team was invited to play in the Sun Bowl under the condition that African-American player David Showell not play. The Lafayette College faculty would turn down the invitation.

== November 20, 1948 (Saturday) ==
- British philosopher Bertrand Russell told a London conference of schoolchildren and teachers that the West must either fight Russia before it developed an atomic bomb or "lie down and let them govern us."
- New Zealand doctor Geoffrey Orbell rediscovered the South Island takahē, widely thought to have been extinct, near Lake Te Anau.
- Born: John R. Bolton, diplomat and attorney, in Baltimore, Maryland; Barbara Hendricks, singer, in Stephens, Arkansas; Richard Masur, actor, in New York City; Harlee McBride, actress, in Los Angeles, California; Gunnar Nilsson, racing driver, in Helsingborg, Sweden (d. 1978)

== November 21, 1948 (Sunday) ==
- Madame Chiang Kai-shek made a radio broadcast from Nanjing to the United States urging "immediate and definite" aid to China, saying that if communism were to prevail there that "you, my friends, will ultimately also be suffering. For with China's strategic position, resources and manpower in Communist hands, you yourself will be greatly weakened. If China falls, all of Asia goes."
- Born: Michel Suleiman, President of Lebanon 2008–2014, in Amsheet, Lebanon
- Died: Béla Miklós, 58, Hungarian military officer and acting Prime Minister of Hungary 1944–45

== November 22, 1948 (Monday) ==
- The Shuangduiji Campaign began during the Chinese Civil War.
- Died: A. E. W. Mason, 83, English author and politician; Fakhri Pasha, 79 or 80, Ottoman Army commander

== November 23, 1948 (Tuesday) ==
- Israeli forces launched Operation Lot with the objective of creating a land corridor to the isolated Dead Sea enclave.
- King George VI missed his first public engagement when he canceled a visit to the Royal Naval College in Greenwich due to a blood clot in his right leg. Prime Minister Clement Attlee announced in the House of Commons that the King's royal tour of Australia and New Zealand would be postponed.
- The United States Army Corps of Engineers announced the completion of a 430-mile highway from Athens to Thessaloniki.
- Born: Ron Bouchard, racing driver, in Fitchburg, Massachusetts (d. 2015); Dominique-France Loeb-Picard, wife of King Fuad II of Egypt, in Paris, France; Gabriele Seyfert, figure skater, in Chemnitz, Germany
- Died: Hack Wilson, 48, American baseball player

== November 24, 1948 (Wednesday) ==
- 1948 Venezuelan coup d'état: Venezuelan President Rómulo Gallegos was overthrown and replaced by military officer Carlos Delgado Chalbaud.
- The neorealist drama film Bicycle Thieves (Ladri di biciclette) directed by Vittorio De Sica and starring Lamberto Maggiorani premiered in Italy.
- Born: Joe Howard, actor, in Yonkers, New York
- Died: Anna Jarvis, 84, American founder of Mother's Day in the United States

== November 25, 1948 (Thursday) ==
- Operation Lot concluded with its main objectives accomplished, strengthening Israel's hold on the Negev desert.
- The Longshore strike on the west coast of the United States ended after almost three months when workers accepted a 15-cent hourly pay raise.
- Lou Boudreau of the Cleveland Indians was named Major League baseball's Most Valuable Player for the American League.
- KING-TV, the first television station in the Pacific Northwest, began broadcasting from Seattle.

== November 26, 1948 (Friday) ==
- The Dáil Éireann passed the Republic of Ireland bill, severing Ireland's last remaining ties to the British Crown.
- CBS announced the acquisition of The Jack Benny Program from NBC.
- Born: Elizabeth Blackburn, biologist and Nobel Prize laureate, in Hobart, Tasmania

== November 27, 1948 (Saturday) ==
- The French General Confederation of Labour called off its eight-week coal mining strike, although 90 percent of the miners had already gone to back to work anyway.
- 102,500 packed Philadelphia Municipal Stadium to see the Army–Navy Game end in a 21-21 tie.
- The Calgary Stampeders defeated the Ottawa Rough Riders 12-7 to win the 36th Grey Cup of Canadian football. It was the first Grey Cup title for the city of Calgary and the first time that a CFL team completed an undefeated season.

== November 28, 1948 (Sunday) ==
- A warrant for the arrest of former Japanese Prime Minister Hitoshi Ashida was submitted to the lower house of the National Diet in connection with the corruption scandal that brought down his government.
- Born: Agnieszka Holland, director and screenwriter, in Warsaw, Poland
- Died: D. D. Sheehan, 75, Irish politician

== November 29, 1948 (Monday) ==
- Israel formally applied for membership in the United Nations.
- The Pingjin Campaign began in the Chinese Civil War.
- The ABC television network aired the Metropolitan Opera's opening night production of Verdi's Otello. Almost two million viewers tuned in to watch.
- Born: Yōichi Masuzoe, politician, in Kitakyushu, Japan

== November 30, 1948 (Tuesday) ==
- The Negro National League of baseball formally dissolved. Three of its six teams folded and the other three merged with the Negro American League.
- Southern Methodist University halfback Doak Walker was named winner of the Heisman Trophy.
- Died: Władysław T. Benda, 75, Polish artist
