= Extraterrestrial real estate =

Ownership claims of property on other planets, moons, or parts of outer space

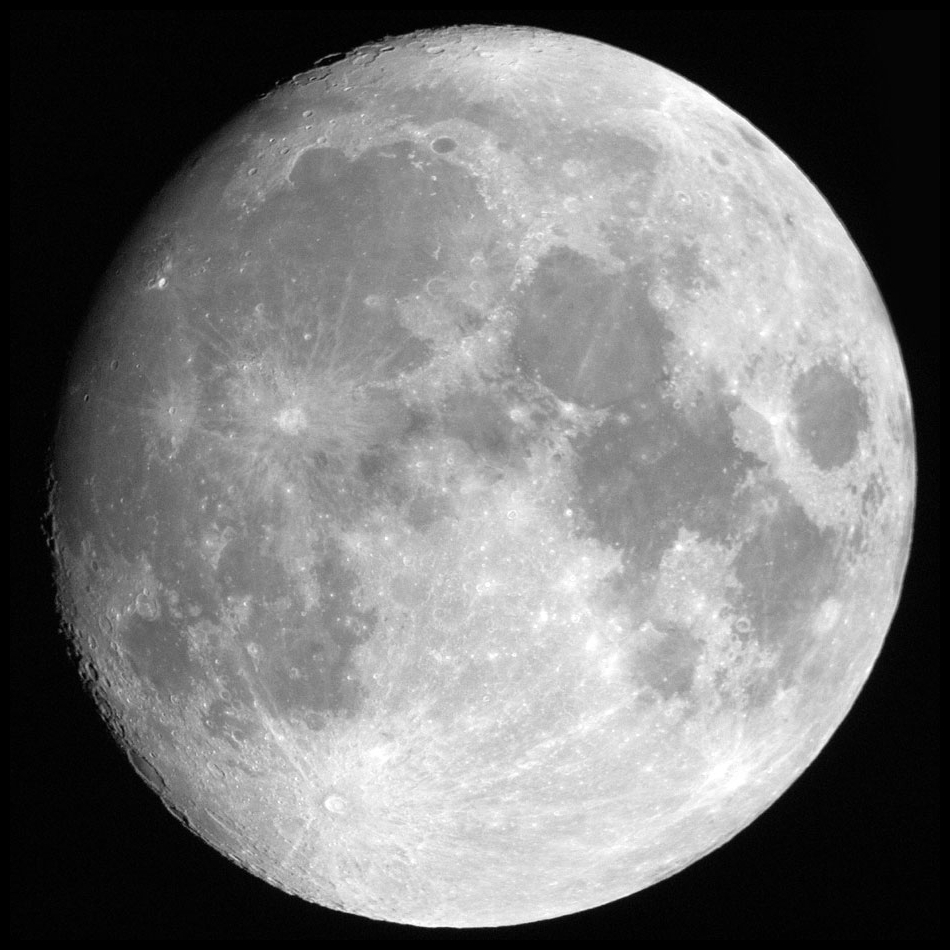
The Moon as seen by an observer from Earth. It is claimed as private property by several individuals.

Extraterrestrial real estate refers to claims of land ownership on other planets, natural satellites, or parts of space by certain organizations or individuals. Most claims on extraterrestrial real estate have not been recognized by any authority, and have no legal standing. Nevertheless, some private individuals and organizations have claimed ownership of celestial bodies, such as the Moon, and have been involved in "selling" parts of them through certificates of ownership termed "Lunar deeds", "Martian deeds" or similar.

While personal claims have had little weight, whole states could potentially lay claim to colonizing celestial bodies. Extraterrestrial real estate not only deals with the legal standpoints of potential colonization, but how it could be feasible for long-term real estate. There are multiple unique factors to consider in extraterrestrial real estate, including transportation, planetary protection, sustainability, astrobiology, how an extraterrestrial real estate market could function, and orbital real estate.

== History ==
The topic of real estate on celestial objects has been written about since the 1890s. Dean Lindsay made claims for all extraterrestrial objects on June 15, 1936. The public sent offers to buy objects from him as well.

== Law and governance ==
The United Nations-sponsored 1967 Outer Space Treaty established all of outer space as an international commons by describing it as the "province of all mankind" and forbidding any nation from claiming territorial sovereignty. Article VI vests the responsibility for activities in space to States Parties, regardless of whether they are carried out by governments or non-governmental entities. The Outer Space Treaty of 1967 had been ratified by 102 countries by 2013, including all the major space-faring nations. It has also been signed but not yet ratified by 26 other nations.

The Outer Space Treaty established the basic ramifications for space activity in Article 1:

"The exploration and use of outer space, including the Moon and other celestial bodies, shall be carried out for the benefit and in the interests of all countries, irrespective of their degree of economic or scientific development, and shall be the province of all mankind."

It continues in Article 2 by stating:

"Outer space, including the Moon and other celestial bodies, is not subject to national appropriation by claim of sovereignty, by means of use or occupation, or by any other means."

The development of international space law has largely revolved around outer space as the "province of all mankind". The Magna Carta of Space presented by William A. Hyman in 1966 framed outer space explicitly not as terra nullius but as res communis, which subsequently influenced the work of the United Nations Committee on the Peaceful Uses of Outer Space.

A subsequent treaty document, the international Moon Treaty—finalised in 1979 (just five countries had ratified it by 1984, but five countries was sufficient for it to be considered officially in force)—went further and forbade private ownership of extraterrestrial real estate. This agreement has not been widely ratified, with only 18 countries having ratified it by 2018.

Several individuals and private organizations claimed ownership of the moon and other extraterrestrial bodies, but no such claims have yet been recognized. A white paper by the Competitive Enterprise Institute suggested legislation wherein the US would recognize claims made by private entities, American and others, which meet certain conditions regarding habitation and transportation.

== Private purchase schemes ==
Some individuals and organizations offer schemes or plans claiming to allow people to purchase portions of the Moon or other celestial bodies. Though the details of some of the schemes' legal arguments vary, one goes so far as to state that, although the Outer Space Treaty (which entered force in 1967) forbids countries from claiming celestial bodies, there is no such provision forbidding private citizens from doing so. However, Article VI of this treaty states "The activities of non-governmental entities in outer space, including the moon and other celestial bodies, shall require authorization and continuing supervision by the appropriate State Party to the Treaty." Thus, while it does not explicitly prohibit such schemes, the treaty does require they be authorized by the claimants' government.

The short story The Man Who Sold the Moon by Robert A. Heinlein, which was written in 1949, offers a portrayal of such plans or schemes, and created the concept of a "Lunar Republic". Heinlein's 1961 novel Stranger in a Strange Land also refers to a space law case called the Larkin Decision.

Since the 1970s, various companies and "star registries" claiming to sell stars or naming rights to them have been created.

=== Geostationary orbits ===
A space ownership issue of current practical importance is the allocation of slots for satellites in geostationary orbit. This is managed by the International Telecommunication Union. The 1976 Declaration of the First Meeting of Equatorial Countries, also known as the Bogota Declaration, signed by several countries located on the Earth's equator, attempted to assert sovereignty over those portions of the geostationary orbit that continuously lie over the signatory nation's territory. These claims did not receive wider international support or recognition and were subsequently largely abandoned. Instead, slots have thereafter been internationally allocated.

== Orbital real estate ==
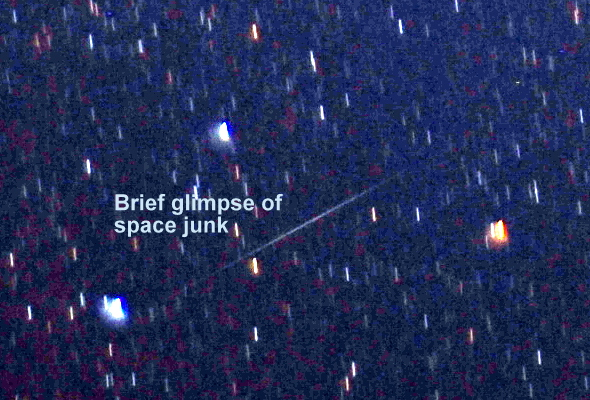
A spot of space debris illuminates in the night sky.

Two problematic issues arise regarding derelict spacecraft: In orbit around the Earth, 'dead' and abandoned satellites threaten future travel in the same orbits with a spray of deadly debris. In orbit around extraterrestrial planets, non-sterile orbiters in decaying orbits threaten to pollute the remote planets they orbit with Earth-organisms, and hence create a false 'signal' of alien life, possibly destroying or supplanting native life, or infesting its remains.

=== Build-up of hazards in orbit around Earth ===
A prominent environmental problem in near-Earth orbital space is "space junk". Human-made refuse left in space endangers orbital real estate for future satellites, causing problems for future use of nearby space. In the case of debris cluttering orbital space, if the orbiting debris continue to build up without remediation, orbits near the Earth will become so crowded with deadly missiles that some operations in space will no longer be attainable.

To remediate damage done by human-made objects, astronauts will need to bring specific hardware into space to exterminate debris. Once cleared, the surrounding space around a planet can then be used for more real estate opportunities. There are specific orbits, however, that have caused ownership debate.

=== Contamination of planets with terrestrial life ===
Another issue is the crashing of abandoned orbital debris on extraterrestrial planets. Before the 21st century, exploration of other planets in the Solar System raised little concern about contaminating planets with life from the Earth. Since then experiments have shown that some terrestrial life is astonishingly hardy, and the time spent in transit in space is not a guarantee of a sterile spacecraft on arrival. Some 'bugs' will survive the trip, potentially invade the planet, eliminating the chance of determining whether life arose independently on other planets, or in the deep geologic past have spread between the planets of the Solar System via hypothetical "panspermia" processes. If an old, contaminated orbiter crashes onto an extraterrestrial planet, except in extreme cases, it will no longer be possible to test the panspermia hypothesis with any confidence in the outcome.

== Notable claims ==
- Richard Garriott, creator of the Ultima series, legitimately purchased in 1993 the Lunokhod 2 and its Luna 21 lander from the then Russian Lavochkin bureau of the Soviet space program, being the first private purchase of an object on another astronomical body. Since then, as a private person being not bound to international agreements, he has jokingly claimed the rest of the Moon in the name of his gaming character, Lord British, or at least the immediate area around the two objects and possible the 39 km long path the rover took.

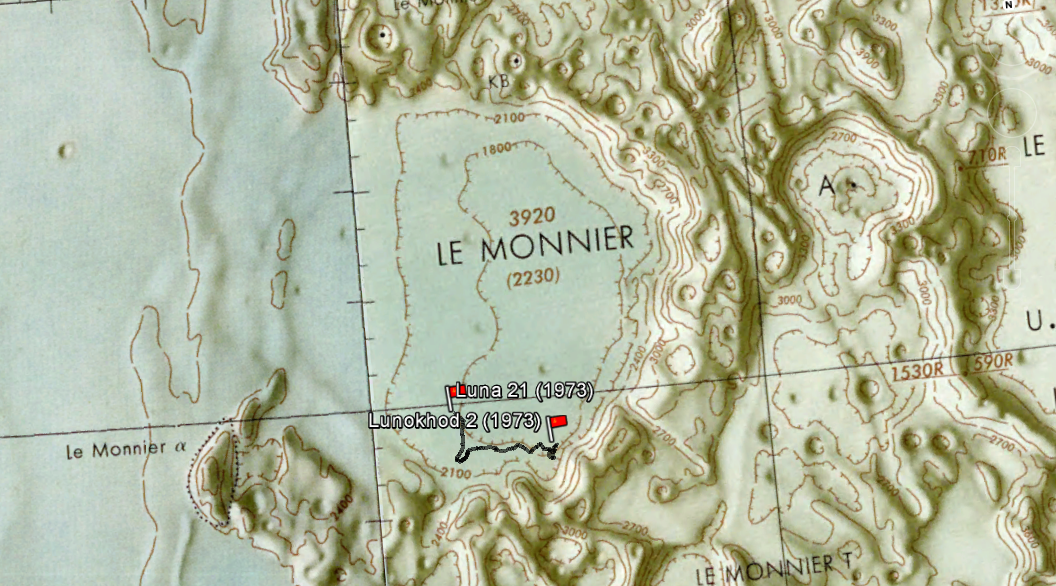
Map of Lunokhod 2's path in Le Monnier crater at the eastern rim of Mare Serenitatis

- Chilean lawyer Jenaro Gajardo Vera gained notoriety for his 1953 claim of ownership of the Moon.
- Martin Juergens from Germany claims that the Moon has belonged to his family since 15 July 1756, when the Prussian king Frederick the Great presented it to his ancestor, Aul Juergens, as a symbolic gesture of gratitude for services rendered, and decreed that it should pass to the youngest born son.
- A. Dean Lindsay made claims for all extraterrestrial objects on June 15, 1936, and sent a letter to Pittsburgh Notary Public along with a deed and money for establishment of the property. The public sent offers to buy objects from him as well. He had previously made claims on the Atlantic and Pacific Oceans.
- James T. Mangan (1896–1970) was a famous eccentric, public relations man and best-selling author on self-help topics who publicly claimed ownership of outer space in 1948. Mangan founded what he called the Nation of Celestial Space and registered it with the Cook County, Illinois, Recorder of Deeds and Titles on 1 January 1949.
- Robert R. Coles, former chairman of New York's Hayden Planetarium, started "the interplanetary Development Corporation" and sold lots on the Moon for one dollar per acre ($2.50/ha).
- Dennis Hope, an entrepreneur in the U.S., sells extraterrestrial real estate. In 1980, he started his own business, the Lunar Embassy Commission. Hope claimed to have sold 2.5M 1-acre (0.40 ha; 4,000 m^{2}) plots on the Moon as of 2009, for around US$20 per acre (US$50/ha). He allocates land to be sold by closing his eyes and randomly pointing to a map of the Moon. He claims two former US presidents as customers, stating Jimmy Carter and Ronald Reagan had aides purchase the plots on the Moon.
- In 1997, three men from Yemen – Adam Ismail, Mustafa Khalil, and Abdullah al-Umari – sued NASA for invading Mars. They claim that they "inherited the planet from our ancestors 3,000 years ago". They based their argument on mythologies of the Himyaritic and Sabaean civilizations that existed several thousand years B.C.E.
- Gregory W. Nemitz claimed ownership of Asteroid (433) Eros, which NEAR Shoemaker landed on in 2001. His company, called "Orbital Development", presented NASA with a bill for US$20, for parking the spacecraft at the asteroid. NASA declined to pay, citing the lack of legal standing.

== See also ==
- Common heritage of mankind
- Land claim
- Sale of star names
- Real estate
- Real estate business
