= January 1949 =

Month of 1949

<<	January 1949					>>
Su	Mo	Tu	We	Th	Fr	Sa
						1
2	3	4	5	6	7	8
9	10	11	12	13	14	15
16	17	18	19	20	21	22
23	24	25	26	27	28	29
30	31

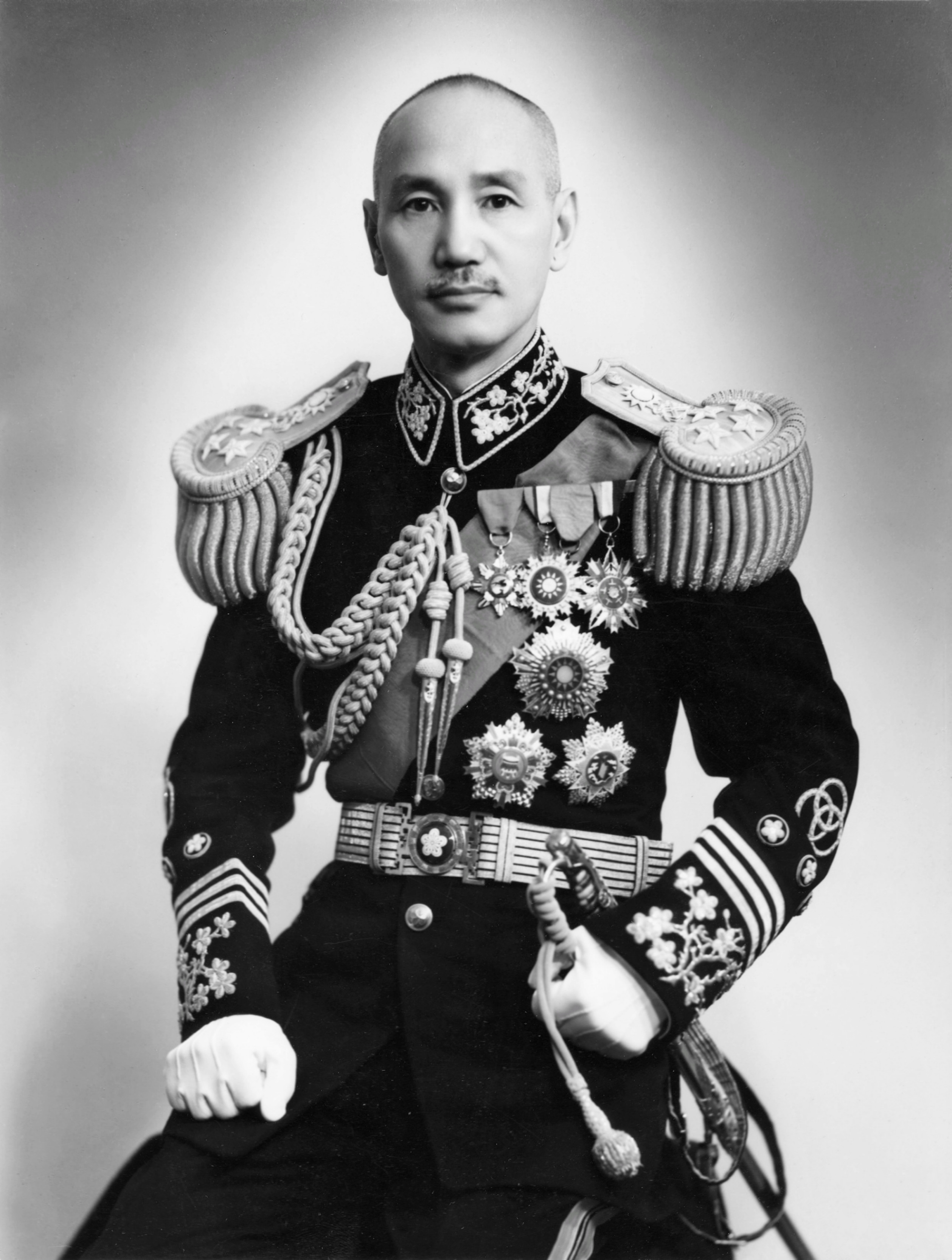
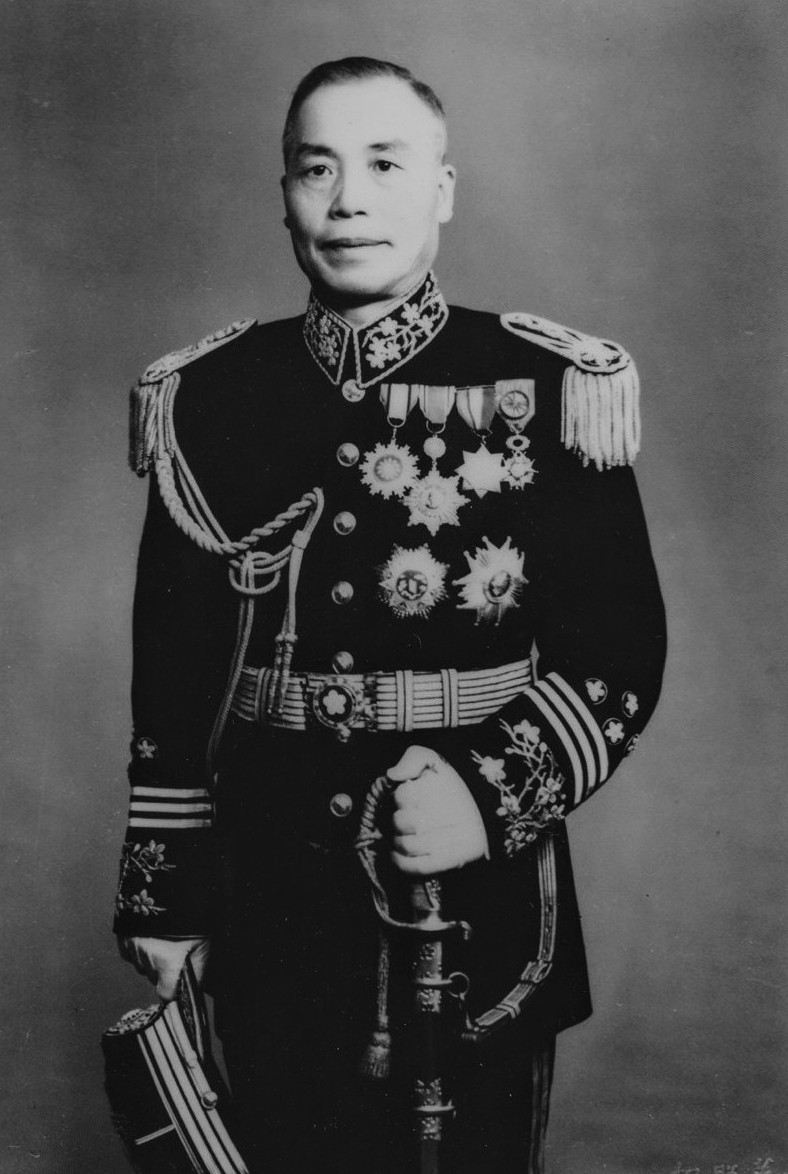
January 21, 1949: As Mao Zedong's troops approach Nanjing, Republic of China President Chiang Kai-shek resigns, and is replaced by Li Zongren.

The following events occurred in January 1949:

== January 1, 1949 (Saturday) ==
- A United Nations-sponsored ceasefire ended the Indo-Pakistani War in a stalemate and the division of Kashmir.
- In the Indonesian conflict, Dutch authorities proclaimed that fighting on Java was at an end with the exception of "rebellious elements."
- The International University Sports Federation was formed.
- In college bowl games across the United States, the Northwestern Wildcats defeated the California Golden Bears 20–14 in the Rose Bowl, the Texas Longhorns beat the Georgia Bulldogs 41–28 in the Orange Bowl, the West Virginia Mountaineers defeated the Texas Western Miners 21–12 in the Sun Bowl, the Oklahoma Sooners beat the North Carolina Tar Heels 14–6 in the Sugar Bowl and the SMU Mustangs beat the Oregon Webfoots 21–13 in the Cotton Bowl Classic.
- Evergreen Park, Illinois resident James T. Mangan established the Nation of Celestial Space (or Celestia), a micronation that claimed ownership of the entirety of outer space. Mangan would actively pursue claims of behalf of Celestia until his death in 1970.
- Born: Max Azria, fashion designer, in Sfax, Tunisia (d. 2019)
- Died: William H. Lewis, 80, American football player, coach and first African-American United States Attorney

== January 2, 1949 (Sunday) ==
- The Vatican announced rejection of an offer from the Hungarian government to enter negotiations on the status of the Catholic Church in Hungary. Vatican officials made it known that the offer could not be considered as long as Cardinal József Mindszenty remained in jail.
- The Battles of the Sinai in the Arab-Israeli War ended when Israeli forces withdrew from the Sinai Peninsula.
- At Boeing Field in Seattle, a Douglas DC-3 skidded down an ice-coated runway until it struck a hangar and burst into flames, killing all 3 crew and 11 of the 27 passengers aboard. The chartered plane was for Yale University students returning to school from Christmas vacation.
- Luis Muñoz Marín took office as the 1st Governor of Puerto Rico.
- Born: Christopher Durang, playwright, in Montclair, New Jersey (d. 2024)
- Died: Harold Grimwade, 79, Australian businessman and general

== January 3, 1949 (Monday) ==
- The final major combat operation of the Arab-Israeli War was launched when the Battle of Rafah began, as Israel attempted to encircle all Egyptian forces in Palestine and drive them back to Egypt.
- The 81st United States Congress convened.
- 37 people were reported killed by tornadoes in Warren, Arkansas.
- The U.S. Supreme Court decided Lincoln Union v. Northwestern Co., upholding the rights of states to bar the closed shop.
- Born: Sylvia Likens, American torture and murder victim (tortured for three months), born in Lebanon, Indiana (d. 1965).
  - Gary Lavelle, American baseball pitcher (MLB All Star 1977, 83; SF Giants), born in Scranton, Pennsylvania.
  - Vincenzo Vinciguerra, Italian neo-fascist activist.
- Died: Alexander Drankov, 62, Russian photographer, cameraman and filmmaker

== January 4, 1949 (Tuesday) ==
- A UN Security Council committee of six experts issued a plan for settlement of the Berlin currency control dispute. The plan called for creation of separate banking systems for East and West Berlin as well as a new bank of issue for the entire city under Big Four supervision.
- The RMS Caronia of the Cunard Line departed Southampton on her maiden voyage to New York.

== January 5, 1949 (Wednesday) ==
- U.S. President Harry S. Truman gave the annual State of the Union address to Congress, putting forth an ambitious set of proposals known as the Fair Deal.
- Dutch paratroopers took the Sumatran city of Rengat and, according to eyewitness accounts, carried out a massacre of civilians there. Dutch authorities listed the event as an "incident" in which about 80 "non-combatants" died, but Indonesian estimates place the number killed in the thousands.
- Died: Lily Yeats, 82, Irish embroiderer

== January 6, 1949 (Thursday) ==
- Nuri al-Said became Prime Minister of Iraq for the fifth time.
- Born: Carolyn D. Wright, poet, in Mountain Home, Arkansas (d. 2016)
- Died: Victor Fleming, 59, American film director; Gennaro Righelli, 62, Italian actor and filmmaker

== January 7, 1949 (Friday) ==
- A new ceasefire in the Arab-Israeli War went into effect.
- Five RAF reconnaissance planes were shot down by the Israelis near Rafah.
- George Marshall resigned as United States Secretary of State for health reasons. President Truman named Dean Acheson as Marshall's successor.
- Several clashes were reported to have broken out between Burmese and separatist Karen tribesmen over a series of Christmas Eve incidents in which Burmese military police allegedly massacred 200 Karen men and women who were attending religious services in the Mergui district of Burma. This was the beginning of the Karen conflict, one of the longest-running civil wars in the world.
- Born: Chavo Guerrero Sr., professional wrestler, in El Paso, Texas (d. 2017)
- Died: Suehiko Shiono, 69, Japanese lawyer and politician

== January 8, 1949 (Saturday) ==
- The Air Ministry stated that British aircraft "have now been instructed to regard as hostile any Jewish aircraft encountered over Egyptian territory."
- "All I Want for Christmas (Is My Two Front Teeth)" by Spike Jones and His Orchestra topped the Billboard singles chart.
- Died: Yoshijirō Umezu, 67, Japanese general
- The low band FM-radio transmitters between 42 and 50 MHz permanently closed down in the United States after the transition ended following the introduction of the 88 to 108 MHz FM band in 1945.

== January 9, 1949 (Sunday) ==
- Israel made an official protest to the United Nations concerning British forces recently landed at Aqaba, which Israel considered a hostile act.
- A freak four-day snowfall began in the Los Angeles area, depositing almost a foot of snow on the San Fernando Valley and wreaking havoc on citrus growers.
- Born: Mary Roos, singer and actress, in Bingen am Rhein, Germany
- Died: Tommy Handley, 56, British comedian; Martin Grabmann, 74, German catholic priest and scholar

== January 10, 1949 (Monday) ==
- President Truman submitted the annual federal budget to Congress. The budget called for expenditure of a peacetime record $41.858 billion and projected a deficit of $873 million, which the president said should be transformed into a surplus by raising taxes.
- Alexander Papagos became Commander-in-Chief of Greek land forces in the ongoing Greek Civil War.
- The Huaihai Campaign ended in Communist victory.
- RCA Victor introduced the 45 RPM record to compete with Columbia's 33⅓.
- Born: George Foreman, boxer, in Marshall, Texas (d. 2025); Linda Lovelace, adult film actress, as Linda Boreman in the Bronx, New York (d. 2002)

== January 11, 1949 (Tuesday) ==
- The U.S. State Department said it had "no immediate plans" to comply with a request from Communist Hungary to return the 950-year old crown of King Saint Stephen, which had been found by American troops hidden in an Austrian salt mine in 1945.
- The Battle of Jiulianshan ended in failure for the Nationalists.
- WDTV (known today as KDKA-TV) went on the air in Pittsburgh, providing the first "network" connecting Pittsburgh and 13 other cities from Boston to St. Louis.
- Born: Daryl Braithwaite, singer, in Melbourne, Australia
- Died: Nelson Doubleday, 59, American book publisher and president of Doubleday Company

== January 12, 1949 (Wednesday) ==
- The Communists closed within artillery range of Beijing and began shelling the city.
- Prices and wages in France were frozen by government decree in an effort to check inflation.
- The drama film noir The Accused starring Loretta Young and Robert Cummings opened in New York City.
- Born: Ottmar Hitzfeld, footballer and manager, in Lörrach, Germany; Haruki Murakami, writer, in Kyoto, Japan; Wayne Wang, film director, in British Hong Kong

== January 13, 1949 (Thursday) ==
- On the island of Rhodes, Israeli and Egyptian representatives began armistice negotiations with UN mediator Ralph Bunche.
- Durban Race riots began in South Africa over a rumor that an African boy had been killed by an Indian pushcart peddler.
- Born: Brandon Tartikoff, president of NBC, in Freeport, New York (d. 1997)
- Died: Eduardo Barrón, 60, Spanish aeronautical engineer and military pilot
- Born: Stuart Bennett, Peel, Isle of Man. Panel beater and Paint Sprayer (d. 2024)

== January 14, 1949 (Friday) ==
- A statement from Mao Zedong was broadcast over Chinese radio announcing his conditions for peace in the Civil War. Mao's demands included abolition of the Kuomintang government, punishment of war criminals and the convocation of a political consultative conference to establish a new coalition government.
- Poland signed the largest deal made by an Eastern European country since the end of the war when it concluded a trade agreement with Britain providing for an exchange of goods over the next five years worth £260 million.
- Born: Lawrence Kasdan, screenwriter, director and producer, in Miami, Florida
- Died: Juan Bielovucic, 59, Peruvian aviator; Harry Stack Sullivan, 56, American psychiatrist; Joaquín Turina, 69, Spanish composer

== January 15, 1949 (Saturday) ==
- In China, the Communists completed the conquest of the important industrial city of Tianjin.
- Three days of the worst race rioting in the history of South Africa ended with 105 dead.
- Poland and the Soviet Union signed a commercial agreement providing for a 35% increase in trade between the two countries.
- Born: Bobby Grich, baseball player, in Muskegon, Michigan

== January 16, 1949 (Sunday) ==
- Şemsettin Günaltay became 8th Prime Minister of Turkey.
- Born: Caroline Munro, actress and model, in Windsor, Berkshire, England

== January 17, 1949 (Monday) ==
- BSAA Star Ariel disappearance: An Avro Tudor of British South American Airways disappeared over the Atlantic Ocean on a flight from Bermuda to Kingston, Jamaica with 20 on board. The speculation resulting from the disappearance of the plane helped fuel the legend of the Bermuda Triangle.
- The Smith Act trial of 11 leading American Communists charged with plotting the overthrow of the U.S. government opened in New York City.
- The Volkswagen Beetle was introduced to the United States when Dutch businessman Ben Pon arrived on a ship with two Beetles, striving to establish a dealer network in America. Due to their small size and a stigma associated with German products in the years after the war, Pon found no takers and the Beetle would not catch on in America for several more years.
- A television version of the popular radio show The Goldbergs premiered on CBS. The program would become one of TV's first hit sitcoms, running through 1955.
- Born: Gyude Bryant, politician and businessman, in Monrovia, Liberia (d. 2014); Andy Kaufman, entertainer, actor and performance artist, in New York City (d. 1984); Mick Taylor, guitarist for John Mayall's Bluesbreakers and The Rolling Stones, in Welwyn Garden City, England

== January 18, 1949 (Tuesday) ==
- Spain decreed that starting July 1, a gift in Spanish pesetas worth 230 U.S. dollars would be given to working class newlyweds to "help the labouring masses to found new homes and numerous families."
- Born: Philippe Starck, industrial designer, in Paris, France

== January 19, 1949 (Wednesday) ==
- The Nationalist Chinese government served official notice on foreign diplomats that it was moving its capital from Nanjing to Guangzhou.
- The Congress of Industrial Organizations, Trades Union Congress and Dutch Federation of Labour abandoned the World Federation of Trade Unions, charging that it was Communist-dominated.
- The Poe Toaster was first documented as appearing at the grave of Edgar Allan Poe on the anniversary of the author's birthday.
- Born: Robert Palmer, singer, in Batley, England (d. 2003); Dennis Taylor, snooker player and commentator, in Coalisland, Northern Ireland

== January 20, 1949 (Thursday) ==
- The second inauguration of Harry S. Truman was held in Washington, D.C. It was the first U.S. presidential inauguration to be televised.
- The romantic drama film A Letter to Three Wives starring Jeanne Crain, Linda Darnell and Ann Sothern was released.
- Born: Göran Persson, 31st Prime Minister of Sweden, in Vingåker, Sweden

== January 21, 1949 (Friday) ==
- Chiang Kai-shek stepped down as President of the Republic of China. Vice President Li Zongren became acting president.
- Dean Acheson became United States Secretary of State.
- The United States extended diplomatic recognition to the junta governments of Venezuela and El Salvador. The State Department emphasized that doing so did not "imply any judgement whatsoever as to the domestic policy" of either regime.
- Died: Joseph Cawthorn, 80, American actor

== January 22, 1949 (Saturday) ==
- The headquarters of Nationalist Chinese military leader Fu Zuoyi announced an agreement "to shorten the civil war and to satisfy the public desire for peace" by allowing Beijing to peacefully come under control of the Communists.
- The report of the Lynskey tribunal appeared in Britain, clearing all those involved except John Belcher and George Gibson.
- "A Little Bird Told Me" by Evelyn Knight hit #1 on the Billboard singles chart.
- Born: Steve Perry, lead singer of the rock band Journey, in Hanford, California
- Died: Henry Slocum, 86, American tennis player

== January 23, 1949 (Sunday) ==
- General elections were held in Japan. The Democratic Liberal Party won 269 of the 466 seats.
- Bozo the Clown made his TV debut on Bozo's Circus airing Sunday evenings on KTTV Los Angeles, with Pinto Colvig as the original Bozo.
- Died: Joseph Wright Harriman, 81, American businessman convicted of bank fraud in a highly publicized 1934 court case

== January 24, 1949 (Monday) ==
- The treason trial of "Axis Sally" Mildred Gillars opened in Washington.
- France announced de facto recognition of the State of Israel.
- Born: John Belushi, actor, comedian and singer, in Chicago, Illinois (d. 1982); Nikolaus Brender, journalist, in Freiburg im Breisgau, Germany

== January 25, 1949 (Tuesday) ==
- The first elections for the Constituent Assembly were held in newly independent Israel. The Mapai led by David Ben-Gurion won a plurality of seats.
- The first Emmy Awards were presented at the Hollywood Athletic Club in Los Angeles. Pantomime Quiz won Most Popular Television Program.
- Born: John Cooper Clarke, punk poet in Salford, England
- Died: Makino Nobuaki, 87, Japanese statesman (b. 1861)

== January 26, 1949 (Wednesday) ==
- Franz von Papen was freed by a denazification court in Nuremberg, which ruled that he was only a class 2 offender and that the four years he had already served in prison were sufficient punishment. Von Papen had his personal property restored but was barred from holding public office, voting, and writing or making speeches on public affairs.
- The Australian nationality law came into effect, determining for the first time who is and who is not an Australian citizen.
- Born:
  - David Strathairn, actor, in San Francisco, California
  - Stephen Rapp, American lawyer and former politician, U.S. Ambassador-at-Large for Global Criminal Justice, in Waterloo, Iowa

== January 27, 1949 (Thursday) ==
- The Chinese steamer Taiping sank after a collision with a cargo ship near Zhoushan, killing over 1,500 people.
- Actor Tyrone Power and actress Linda Christian were married in Rome.
- Born: Djavan, singer-songwriter, in Maceió, Brazil

== January 28, 1949 (Friday) ==
- The UN Security Council voted 8-0 to approve a plan to transfer sovereignty of the Dutch East Indies to a new United States of Indonesia by July 1950. Dutch delegate Herman van Roijen attacked the plan as amounting to imposing a UN "guardianship" over his country and warned that it would lead to lawlessness and disorder if implemented.
- Rebels in the Karen conflict occupied Bassein.
- Born: Mike Moore, 34th Prime Minister of New Zealand, in Whakatane, New Zealand (d. 2020); Gregg Popovich, basketball coach, in East Chicago, Indiana
- Died: Jean-Pierre Wimille, 40, French racing driver (killed during a practice run)

== January 29, 1949 (Saturday) ==
- Britain granted diplomatic recognition to the State of Israel.
- Born: Tommy Ramone, drummer of punk rock band the Ramones, as Tamás Erdélyi in Budapest, Hungary (d. 2014)
- Died: Jakub Karol Parnas, 65, Jewish-Polish-Soviet biochemist (died mysteriously in prison)

== January 30, 1949 (Sunday) ==
- Paraguayan President Juan Natalicio González was overthrown by a coup led by Defense Minister Raimundo Rolón.
- In an interview with a reporter from the International News Service, Joseph Stalin said he had "no objection" to meeting with President Truman at some mutually acceptable place to discuss a U.S.-Soviet peace pact.
- Born: Peter Agre, biologist and Nobel laureate, in Northfield, Minnesota

== January 31, 1949 (Monday) ==
- The Pingjin Campaign ended in decisive Communist victory when the Fourth Field Army of the People's Liberation Army entered Beijing to take over the city.
- The United States extended full diplomatic recognition to Israel and Transjordan.
- The soap opera television show These Are My Children premiered on NBC. Although the show only lasted a month, it is widely credited as the first daytime soap opera in TV history.
- Born: Johan Derksen, footballer and sports journalist, in Heteren, Netherlands; Ken Wilber, philosopher, in Oklahoma City, Oklahoma
