= 1953 United States Virgin Islands referendum =

Ballot measure in the US Virgin Islands

A referendum on councils and treasury was held in the United States Virgin Islands on 30 April 1953. It was largely a repetition of the questions from the 1948 referendum. The passage of all four questions in this referendum resulted in the 1954 Organic Act which governs relations with the United States of America to this day.

== Results ==
=== Joint Parliament ===
Do you favor the creation of a single Legislature for the Virgin Islands?

Choice	Votes	%
Yes	1,190	68.67
No	543	31.33
Invalid/blank votes	87	–
Total	1,820	100
Registered voters/turnout	6,348	28.67
Source: Direct Democracy

=== Common Treasury ===
Do you favor the creation of single treasury for the Virgin Islands?

Choice	Votes	%
Yes	1,142	66.40
No	578	33.60
Invalid/blank votes	100	–
Total	1,820	100
Registered voters/turnout	6,348	28.67
Source: Direct Democracy

=== Popular Election of the Governor ===
Do you favor the election of the Governor by the people of the Virgin Islands?

Choice	Votes	%
Yes	966	55.74
No	767	44.26
Invalid/blank votes	87	–
Total	1,820	100
Registered voters/turnout	6,348	28.67
Source: Direct Democracy

=== Representative in US Congress ===
Do you favor a Resident Commissioner from the Virgin Islands in the Congress of the United States?

Choice	Votes	%
Yes	1,762	79.00
No	370	21.00
Invalid/blank votes	58	–
Total	1,820	100
Registered voters/turnout	6,348	28.67
Source: Direct Democracy
