= James Mangan =

James Mangan may refer to:

- James Clarence Mangan (1803–1849), Irish poet
- James T. Mangan (1896–1970), American eccentric, public relations man and author
- Jim Mangan (1929–2007), American baseball player
