= Operation Lot =

Israeli military operation

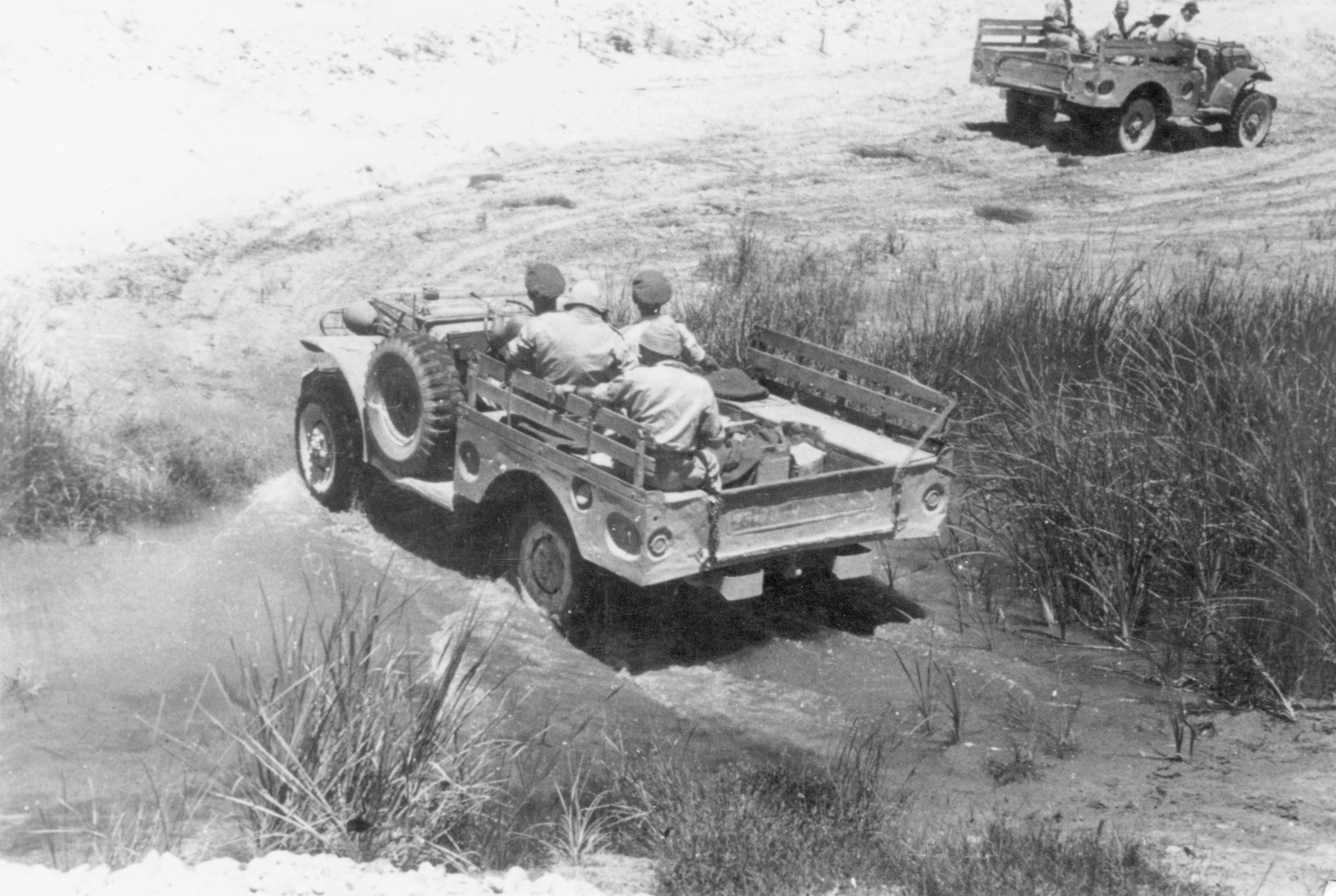
Operation Lot, November 23–25, 1948

Operation Lot (Hebrew: מִבְצָע לוֹט) was an Israeli military operation during the 1948 Arab–Israeli War. It was carried out on November 23–25, 1948, in the eastern Negev desert and the Arava.

The objective of Operation Lot was to create a ground corridor to the isolated Israeli Dead Sea enclave and assert Israeli sovereignty in the area. This became possible after the conquest of Beersheba by the Israel Defense Forces one month earlier, on October 21. The mission was accomplished without battle or firing a single shot.

The operation was carried in difficult terrain, including the Scorpions Pass. It took three days for the main force of the Negev Brigade to reach Mount Sodom, where residents of villages in the Dead Sea region had been evacuated at the beginning of the war. Additional actions were reconnaissance missions in the Arava which helped make the subsequent Operation Uvda possible, and crossing the international border into Transjordan.

== Background ==
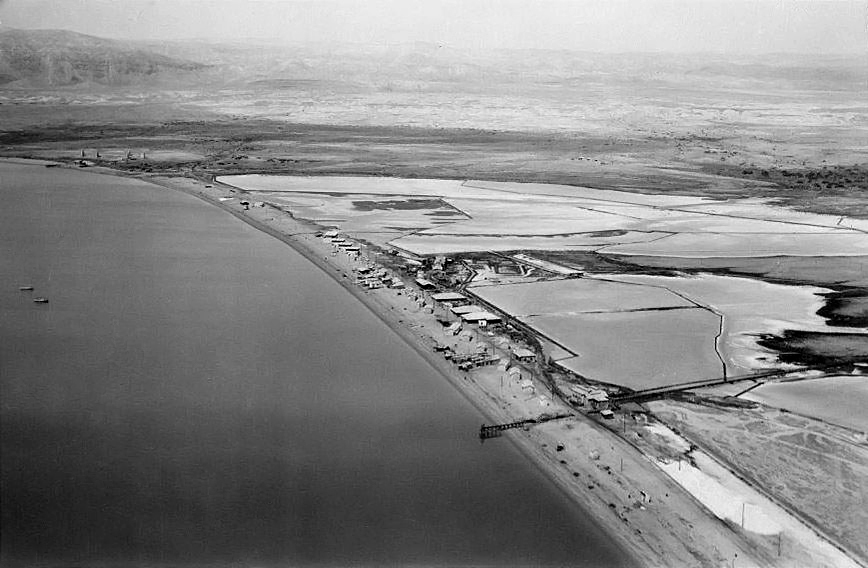
Residential area of Beit HaArava before the war

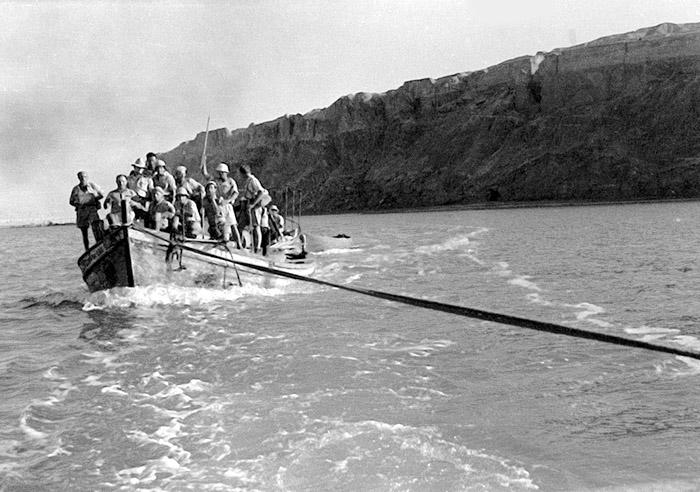
Boat going from Mount Sodom to Kalya before the war

In the beginning of the 1948 Palestine War, Israel held several posts along the Dead Sea shore, including the villages Kalya and Beit HaArava in the northernmost part. These were home to important civilian installations, such as potash plants. Israel sought to keep these plants operational during the war and demilitarize the area—important British businessmen had stakes in the potash plants, and Transjordan stood to make a profit by not attacking the villages and the plants. An agreement was forged with King Abdullah in this regard.

However, with the end of the British Mandate and the Arab invasion of Israel, the situation began to deteriorate. In March–April 1948, British forces ceased protecting Jewish convoys traveling from Jerusalem to the Dead Sea. From May 14 to 17—when Israel's Declaration of Independence and the Arab invasion took place—women and children from Kalya and Beit HaArava were evacuated by plane to other parts of the country. Also at that time, on May 16, Transjordanian troop movements were spotted next to Jericho nearby. In the meantime, the remaining residents sought to surrender to Transjordan and negotiated terms.

After the negotiations concluded on May 18, delegations from the two villages left for Jerusalem and Mount Sodom to present the terms, but Sodom refused to surrender and on May 19 the Jewish Dead Sea residents decided to remain and fight. However, for military reasons they thought best to concentrate all forces at Mount Sodom. On the same day the potash installations were sabotaged and 11.5 tons of explosives destroyed. On May 20, all residents of Kalya and Beit HaArava sailed to Sodom on boats.

== Prelude ==
At that time, Israeli forces had no control over the Negev desert except an enclave west of Beersheba. On May 19, fresh water supplies that had come from Safi in Transjordan ceased, and the Transjordanian Arab Legion fired cannons at Sodom during the war, but never attacked. The base was thus supplied from the air through a makeshift airfield. The fighters tried to capture Safi to get fresh water, but failed. Sodom also had its own potash factory, which was maintained by the fighters so that it could become operational again on short order. For months, large Egyptian forces held the entire Auja–Beersheba–Hebron corridor and heavy fighting took place for control of the western enclave, so Israel could not think of linking up with the Dead Sea forces.

However, this changed in Operation Yoav in October 1948, when Beersheba and its immediate surroundings were captured by the Israel Defense Forces. This split the Egyptian lines and left no serious Egyptian or Transjordanian presence between the Israelis and the Dead Sea. Israel's prime minister and defense minister David Ben-Gurion was keen on capturing Kurnub and Ein Husub because he believed that those areas were fit for settlement because of a large spring. He also saw historical value in Ein Husub, which was not far from where Solomon's mines were said to have been. In addition, the area was part of the Jewish State in the 1947 Partition Plan.

Throughout October and early November, small scouting parties were sent to the southern Negev, from the Large Makhtesh to the Dead Sea. Although these parties discovered no enemy presence, Israeli intelligence discovered that following the capture of Beersheba, the Arab Legion took up positions in the Arava and Hebron. It was feared that they would continue from either place to the Dead Sea area, which factored into the decision for taking and holding the area.

== Operation ==
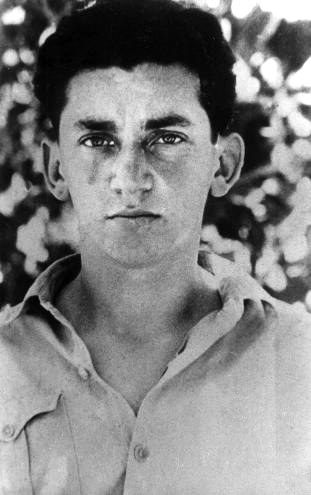
Haim Bar-Lev

Ben-Gurion personally gave the order to capture and hold the police stations of Mamshit (Kurnub) and Ein Husub. The operation was named Lot for the biblical character who had lived in ancient Sodom. On the tactical level, the operational order was given by the Negev Brigade's new operations officer, Uzi Narkis. The action was to begin on November 22, and the internal name for the operation was Dabambam, in memory of the Negev Brigade officer Gershon Dabbenbaum who had been killed in action. An additional route to the sea Nevatim was explored—a northern route through Ras Zuweira near where Arad is today. While a scouting force was able to meet up with Sodom's scouts on the northern path, the bulk of the forces moved south to take Kurnub and Ein Husub. The action was postponed by 24 hours because reinforcements were needed in the Bir 'Asluj area.

The Negev Brigade staff released the following declaration on November 23:

Today the brigade moves the border of Israel one hundred kilometers south. Today we will liberate Sodom from siege and blockade. Today the Dead Sea will be annexed in practice to the State of Israel! Every place we will go and hold – is ours!

The vision, which seemed so far away in the difficult days that we had in the Negev, turns into reality with this operation. The wide open space of the southern Negev, with its treasures, will not be taken from us, not by force and not by political tricks of our enemies.

Ein Husub, Kurnub – are way stations; the task is not finished until we reach our country's borders! And thus, we have set south to finish the job. Be ready and strong!

At 10:00 on November 23, 1948, Negev Brigade forces left Beersheba and reached Kurnub's police station, which they took at 15:30 without a fight. The 7th Battalion took positions there. A second convoy, from the 9th Battalion, led by Haim Bar-Lev, left Beersheba at 16:30. This convoy included two platoons of armored vehicles, an artillery piece, three jeep platoons, two additional infantry platoons, an ambulance, tow trucks and dozens of trucks containing supplies and building materials.

In all, two battalions participated in the operation. The main difficulty of the operation was navigating the mountainous terrain where a vehicle could easily fall into an abyss. Many of the Negev Brigade's soldiers were Palmach veterans who trained in the Judean Desert before the war and had experience moving in similar conditions. Military policemen were active at the front of the convoy by putting up warning signs and guiding the vehicles. In the section leading up to Kurnub, only one truck veered off the road, when the forces spotted an airplane and took cover (it was in fact an Israeli airplane), but after many hours the truck was towed back.

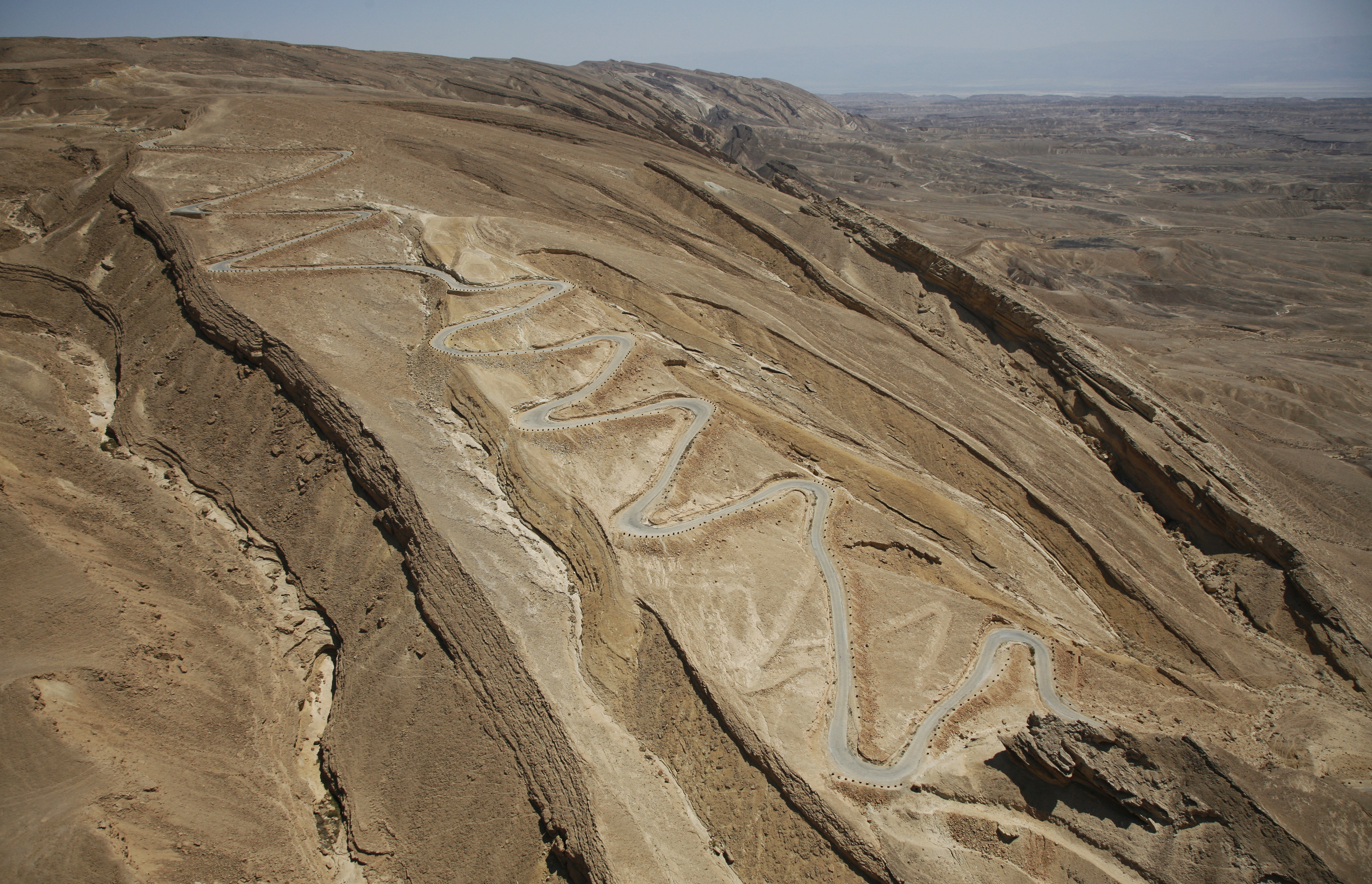
The Scorpion Pass today (the road in the picture was laid after the 1948 Arab–Israeli War)

Upon rendezvousing with 7th Battalion forces near Kurnub and handing over the trucks meant for that position, the convoy started moving toward Ein Husub. This narrow road, today Road 227, including the treacherous Scorpion Pass, was created by the British in 1927 when they were searching the area for natural resources. Going down the Scorpion Pass was done at night and by dawn on November 24, the entire convoy had descended from the pass. In this section, where falling off the road would be fatal, numerous drivers refused to carry out their mission out of fear. At 05:30 early reconnaissance jeeps reached Ein Husub, which still lay abandoned, and the entire convoy was there by 08:30.

The forces spent the day of November 24 converting the five buildings of the Ein Husub police station into a military base, by building fences and deploying artillery, digging trenches and setting up a radio station. Meanwhile, scouting units moved toward Sodom and together with Sodom's soldiers they cleared the mine fields that the same troops had laid in the preceding months in fear of a Transjordanian attack. On November 25 the Israelis moved north and linked up with Sodom. Future Chief of Staff Mordechai Gur was among the Negev Brigade soldiers and had a chance of meeting his brother Shmuel, who was among those blockaded in Sodom during the war.

After accomplishing the main objectives, on November 26 the Israeli forces regrouped in order to reconnoiter the area and look for enemy forces, but not engage them. Scouting parties left for Safi in Jordan and crossed the border near Ein Husub as well. The southernmost scouts moved past the abandoned police station at Ein Weibeh to Ein Ghamr and reached as far as Bir Maliha, about halfway to Umm Rashrash and the Red Sea. The scouts were detected by Arab Legionnaires in multiple instances, and retreated as ordered in those situations. When a scouting party was returning from Transjordan in the Dead Sea area, the Israeli platoon commander Rafi Meir stepped on an Israeli mine. He was eventually airlifted to Jaffa, where he died of his wounds in the Dajani Hospital.

== Aftermath ==
The capture of the Dead Sea area strengthened Israel's hold on the Negev desert and effectively moved the new country's borders about 100 km to the south. It also solidified Israel's claim to the Dead Sea. In the month following the operation, Negev Brigade scouts conducted overt maneuvers in a wide area around Ein Husub to show major Israeli presence to United Nations observers who toured the area. After a month, most Negev forces were redeployed in Beersheba to participate in Operation Horev.

Additionally, it enabled Israel's entire conquest in Operations Uvda and Itzuv. After the area was taken, Israeli Ambassador to the United Nations Abba Eban encouraged immediate settlement of the area to strengthen Israel's hold. Ein Hatzeva, where the Ein Husub police station stood, was only founded in 1960 however, against the recommendation of experts. The paths that the Negev Brigade used in the operation turned into roads when the IDF's Engineering Corps carried out Operation Arava in 1949–1950.
