= Terry Kitchen =

American folk singer-songwriter

Terry Kitchen (born Max Pokrivchak in Phillipsburg, New Jersey) is an American folk singer-songwriter. He grew up in Bethlehem and Easton, Pennsylvania and Findlay, Ohio and attended college at Occidental College and the Guitar Institute of Technology.

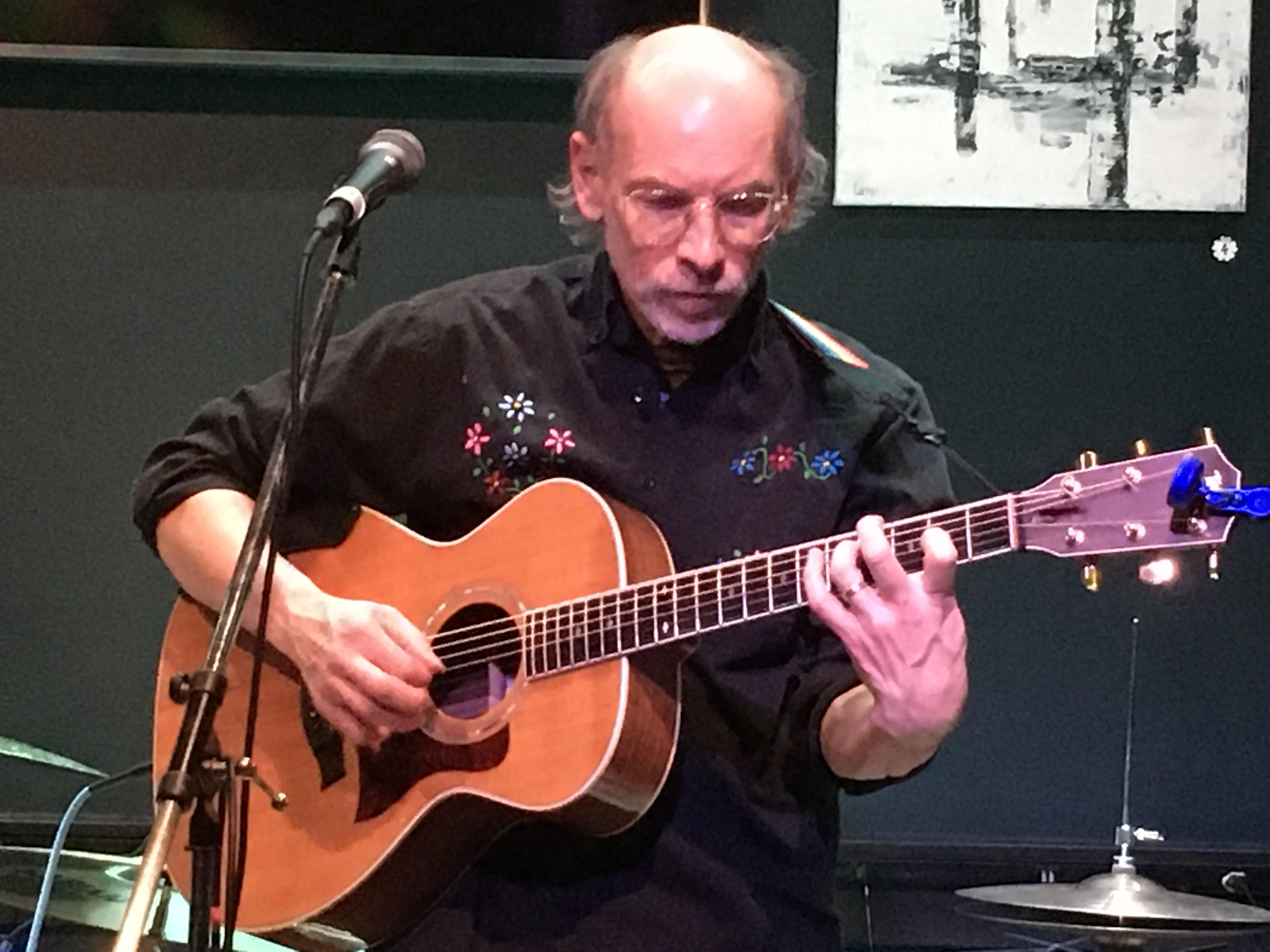
Singer-Songwriter Terry Kitchen Appears At The Square Root Roslindale MA January 2020

After college, he moved to Boston and fronted the 1980s pop/rock band Loose Ties before moving on to a solo career in acoustic music. He has performed in New England coffeehouses and folk festivals, as well as nationally, ever since. Terry also wrote a novel, Next Big Thing (2013), based on his experiences in the band Loose Ties.

He derived his stage name from a character in Kurt Vonnegut, Jr.'s 1988 novel, Bluebeard. Vonnegut's Terry Kitchen was a talented member of the Abstract Expressionist movement.

== Discography ==
- Max Po-KRIV-chak (1991)
- Blues and Grace (1993)
- I Own This Town (1995)
- Blanket (1997)
- Blues for Cain & Abel (1999)
- Perpendicular Universe: Loose Ties 1982–1988 (2001) (with Loose Ties)
- Right Now (2002)
- That's How It Used To Be (2004)
  - Includes the track "The Greatest Game They Never Played" about the 1949 Sun Bowl controversy
- heaven here on earth (2006)
- Summer to Snowflakes (2009)
- Songs from Next Big Thing (2013)
- The Post-American-Century (2015)
- The Quiet Places (2017)
- Rubies in the Dust (2018)
- Where the Action Is: Loose Ties 1985 (2018) (with Loose Ties)
- Next Time We Meet (2020)
- Lost Songs (2021)
- We All Dream (2025)
