= December 1948 =

Month of 1948

<<	December 1948					>>
Su	Mo	Tu	We	Th	Fr	Sa
			1	2	3	4
5	6	7	8	9	10	11
12	13	14	15	16	17	18
19	20	21	22	23	24	25
26	27	28	29	30	31

The following events occurred in December 1948:

== December 1, 1948 (Wednesday) ==
- A meeting of Palestinian leaders in Jericho proclaimed King Abdullah of Trans-Jordan as "King of all Palestine". The move worsened ongoing riots in Damascus and Syrian Prime Minister Jamil Mardam Bey resigned.
- Costa Rican President José Figueres Ferrer abolished the military of Costa Rica, making it the first country in history to do so.
- The People's Bank of China was established, First series of the renminbi was introduced.
- Tamam Shud case: An unidentified body is washed up on the beach in the Adelaide suburb of Somerton Park, South Australia.
- Born: Geraint Davies, Welsh politician; George Foster, baseball player, in Tuscaloosa, Alabama

== December 2, 1948 (Thursday) ==
- A conference of the United States Department of Labor failed to pass a resolution pledging support to President Truman's civil rights program when it was defeated by a vote of 23–21. The American Federation of Labor generally opposed the resolution while the Congress of Industrial Organizations generally supported it.
- Stan Musial of the St. Louis Cardinals was named Major League baseball's Most Valuable Player for the National League. Musial became the first NL player to win the award three times.
- Born: T. C. Boyle, author, in Peekskill, New York; Toninho Horta, jazz guitarist and vocalist, in Minas Gerais, Brazil; Christine Westermann, television and radio host, journalist and author, in Erfurt, Germany

== December 3, 1948 (Friday) ==
- The House Un-American Activities Committee announced that it had "definite proof of one of the most extensive espionage rings in the history of the United States" – microfilms of secret prewar State Department papers submitted by Whittaker Chambers that he had hidden in a hollowed-out pumpkin on his Maryland farm.
- Born: Rick Cua, Christian rock musician, in Syracuse, New York; Ozzy Osbourne, singer and founding member of the heavy metal band Black Sabbath, as John Osbourne in Birmingham, England (d. 2025)
- Died: Chano Pozo, 33, Cuban jazz musician (murdered in Harlem, New York)

== December 4, 1948 (Saturday) ==
- The Chinese steamship SS Kiangya sank near the mouth of the Huangpu River, likely after striking a mine. As many as 3,920 are thought to have perished.
- The House Un-American Activities Committee issued a pamphlet titled 100 Things You Should Know About Communism and Education, claiming that an estimated 800 American Communists trained in Moscow constituted a "secret army" seeking to subvert the US government and gain "new recruits" from the Progressive Party.
- The 1948 Desert Hot Springs earthquake occurred in southern California at 3:43 p.m. local time, resulting in several injuries.

== December 5, 1948 (Sunday) ==
- Israel Defense Forces launched Operation Assaf with the objective of taking control of the western Negev desert.
- Constitutional Assembly elections were held in Argentina, won by the Peronist Party with 59.1% of the vote.
- City Assembly elections were held in West Berlin, with the Social Democrats winning 64.5% of the vote.

== December 6, 1948 (Monday) ==
- The Japanese Diet formally rebuked Emperor Hirohito for communicating directly with President Truman. Hirohito's message merely wished cordial relations between Japan and the United States, but the Diet expressed resentment that Hirohito independently sent a diplomatic message to a foreign power when the new Japanese Constitution made him simply a "national symbol."
- Born: Marius Müller-Westernhagen, actor and musician, in Düsseldorf, Germany; Keke Rosberg, racing driver, in Solna, Sweden; JoBeth Williams, actress, in Houston, Texas
- Died: Bert Hall, 63, American aviator and writer

== December 7, 1948 (Tuesday) ==
- The West Berlin City Assembly unanimously elected Ernst Reuter to serve as acting mayor until the first session of the newly elected Assembly in January 1949.
- Operation Assaf ended in Israeli success.
- The US Supreme Court decided Kimball Laundry Co. v. United States.
- Born: Gary Morris, singer and stage actor, in Fort Worth, Texas; Mads Vinding, jazz double-bassist, in Copenhagen, Denmark

== December 8, 1948 (Wednesday) ==
- Former Japanese Prime Minister Hitoshi Ashida was arrested on bribery charges after the Diet waived his parliamentary immunity.
- Constituent Assembly elections were held in Costa Rica, won by the National Unity Party.

== December 9, 1948 (Thursday) ==
- The United Nations General Assembly adopted the Genocide Convention.
- Born: Gioconda Belli, author, in Managua, Nicaragua

== December 10, 1948 (Friday) ==
- The Universal Declaration of Human Rights was accepted by the United Nations General Assembly.
- The 1948 Nobel Prizes were presented in Stockholm. The recipients were Lord Patrick Blackett (United Kingdom) for Physics, Arne Tiselius (Sweden) for Chemistry, Paul Hermann Müller (Switzerland) for Physiology or Medicine and T. S. Eliot (United Kingdom) for Literature. The Peace Prize was not awarded.
- István Dobi became Prime Minister of Hungary.
- Born: Muhammad Zaidan, leader of the Palestinian Liberation Front, in either Safed, Palestine or Yarmouk Camp, Syria (d. 2004)

== December 11, 1948 (Saturday) ==
- At a ceremony in Ottawa, terms of union were signed between Canada and the Dominion of Newfoundland by which Newfoundland would become a province of Canada pending ratification.
- The romance film Enchantment starring David Niven and Teresa Wright was released.
- Born:
  - Chester Thompson, drummer, in Baltimore, Maryland
  - Shinji Tanimura, Japanese musician, former band member of Alice, in Osaka Prefecture (d. 2023)
- Died: Robert Briffault, 73 or 74, British surgeon, social anthropologist and novelist

== December 12, 1948 (Sunday) ==
- Batang Kali massacre: British troops killed 24 unarmed villagers during the Malayan Emergency.
- Italy and the Soviet Union signed a series of trade and reparations agreements in Moscow. Italy conceded all assets in Romania, Hungary and Bulgaria as reparations. The three-year trade agreement was worth 30 billion lire.
- Michigan State was admitted to the Western Collegiate Athletic Conference, restoring the classic "Big Ten". The conference had been down to nine members since 1946 when the University of Chicago withdrew.
- Born: Marcelo Rebelo de Sousa, 20th President of Portugal, in Lisbon, Portugal

== December 13, 1948 (Monday) ==
- An 11-million peso fraud scandal broke in Argentina. Fourteen men were ordered arrested for involvement in a plot to obtain a government loan for transfer of a non-existent aluminum plant from Italy to Argentina in exchange for bribes. Three members of President Juan Perón's inner circle were among those implicated.
- Born: Lillian Board, track and field athlete, in Durban, South Africa (d. 1970); Ted Nugent, rock musician, in Redford, Michigan; David O'List, musician, in Chiswick, West London, England

== December 14, 1948 (Tuesday) ==
- A nationwide ban on music recording in the United States ended after eleven and a half months when American Federation of Musicians President James Petrillo signed a government-approved agreement with the record industry to create a new trust fund plan compatible with the provisions of the Taft-Hartley Act.
- Salvador Castaneda Castro was overthrown as President of El Salvador in a military coup.
- Born: Lester Bangs, music journalist, critic and musician, in Escondido, California (d. 1982); Kim Beazley, politician, in Perth, Australia; Dee Wallace, actress, in Kansas City, Kansas

== December 15, 1948 (Wednesday) ==
- Former US State Department official Alger Hiss was indicted by federal grand jury on two counts of perjury for denying that he or his wife had ever turned over confidential papers to Whittaker Chambers.
- The first-born child of Princess Elizabeth was christened Charles Philip Arthur George at Buckingham Palace.
- The Shuangduiji Campaign ended in Communist victory.
- Zoé, France's first atomic reactor, began operation at Fort de Châtillon.
- The Northrop X-4 Bantam prototype twin-jet aircraft had its first flight.
- Born:
  - Charlie Scott, basketball player, in New York City
  - Melanie Chartoff, American actress and singer, known for Rugrats

== December 16, 1948 (Thursday) ==
- The United Nations ratified the Universal Declaration of Human Rights.
- Cambodia was granted independence within the French Union.
- The musical revue Lend an Ear by Charles Gaynor with additional sketches by Joseph Stein and Will Glickman and featuring Carol Channing in her starmaking role, had its Broadway premiere at the National Theatre.
- Born: Christopher Biggins, actor and television presenter, in Oldham, England

== December 17, 1948 (Friday) ==
- Israel fell seven Security Council votes short in its bid for UN membership.
- The Finnish Security Intelligence Service was established.
- On the 45th anniversary of the first powered flight, the original Wright Flyer was donated to the Smithsonian Institution in Washington. The Flyer had been in Britain for many years because of a dispute between the Wright brothers and the Smithsonian.
- Died: Philip Pilditch, 87, British architect and politician

== December 18, 1948 (Saturday) ==
- The Dutch government canceled the 11-month long ceasefire in the Indonesian conflict and ordered its forces back into action.
- Operation Peristera began in Greece.
- Born: Bill Nelson, guitarist and singer (Be-Bop Deluxe), in Wakefield, Yorkshire, England

== December 19, 1948 (Sunday) ==
- Dutch forces in Indonesia launched Operation Kraai with the objective of crushing the Indonesian Republic once and for all.
- The Philadelphia Eagles beat the Chicago Cardinals 7-0 in the NFL Championship Game at Shibe Park, Philadelphia.
- The Big Fisherman by Lloyd C. Douglas (later to be made into a film of the same name) topped The New York Times Fiction Best Seller list.
- Died: Amir Sjarifuddin, 41, 2nd Prime Minister of Indonesia (executed by Indonesian Republican officers)

== December 20, 1948 (Monday) ==
- Operation Kraai ended with the Dutch capture of the Indonesian Republican leadership at Yogyakarta.
- The British government issued a White Paper calling for four more years of austerity measures to make Britain self-supporting by the end of the Marshall Plan.
- Born: Alan Parsons, musician and record producer, in London, England
- Died: Laurence Duggan, 43, American economist (fell to his death from his office window, possible suicide); C. Aubrey Smith, 85, English test cricketer and actor

== December 21, 1948 (Tuesday) ==
- The Republic of Ireland Act was signed into law.
- The Polish Socialist Party and Polish Workers' Party merged at the end of a week-long conference to form the Polish United Workers' Party.
- The 1949 NFL draft was held in Philadelphia. The Philadelphia Eagles used their lottery bonus pick to take University of Pennsylvania center Chuck Bednarik as the #1 overall draft pick.
- Born: Ron Bass, professional wrestler, as Ronald Heard in Harrisburg, Arkansas (d. 2017); Samuel L. Jackson, actor, in Washington, D.C.; Dave Kingman, baseball player, in Pendleton, Oregon; Willi Resetarits, singer, comedian and activist, in Stinatz, Austria (d. 2022)

== December 22, 1948 (Wednesday) ==
- Speaking before the UN Security Council, Dutch delegate Jan Herman van Roijen called the invasion of the Indonesian Republic a "police action" over which the UN had no jurisdiction.
- The US State Department suspended $14.1 million in Marshall Plan aid to the Dutch East Indies pending "clarification" of the situation there.
- The Israeli-Egyptian truce ended as Israeli forces launched Operation Horev in the Western Negev with the objective of trapping the Egyptian Army in the Gaza Strip. The Battle of Hill 86 began as part of the operation.
- KPIX-TV went on the air in San Francisco, the first television station in northern California.
- Born: Noel Edmonds, television presenter and executive, in Ilford, England; Flip Mark, child actor, in New York City; Rick Nielsen, guitarist of the rock band Cheap Trick, in Elmhurst, Illinois; Steve Garvey, baseball player, in Tampa, Florida; Lynne Thigpen, actress, in Joliet, Illinois (d. 2003)

== December 23, 1948 (Thursday) ==
- The Battle of Hill 86 ended in Egyptian tactical victory after Israeli forces retreated.
- Yugoslavia and Britain signed a one-year trade agreement worth $120 million US after Yugoslavia promised to compensate British owners of Yugoslavian factories that had been nationalized.
- Born: Jim Ferguson, classical and jazz guitarist, in Dayton, Ohio
- Died: Japanese war leaders (hanged at Sugamo Prison as war criminals):
  - Kenji Doihara, 65, general
  - Kōki Hirota, 70, diplomat and 32nd Prime Minister
  - Seishirō Itagaki, 63, General and War Minister
  - Heitarō Kimura, 60, general
  - Iwane Matsui, 70, general
  - Akira Mutō, 56, general
  - Hideki Tojo, 63, general and 40th Prime Minister

== December 24, 1948 (Friday) ==
- The UN Security Council ordered an immediate ceasefire in Indonesia and called on the Dutch government to release Sukarno and other political prisoners.
- The Western comedy film The Paleface starring Bob Hope and Jane Russell was released.
- The swashbuckler film Adventures of Don Juan starring Errol Flynn and Viveca Lindfors premiered at the Strand Theatre in New York City.

== December 25, 1948 (Saturday) ==
- Israel ordered a complete blackout following Arab air raids.
- The Soviet Union completed its withdrawal from North Korea.
- The war film Command Decision starring Clark Gable, Walter Pidgeon, Van Johnson and Brian Donlevy premiered in Los Angeles.
- Born: Alia Al-Hussein, Queen of Jordan, in Cairo, Egypt (d. 1977); Barbara Mandrell, country musician and actress, in Houston, Texas

== December 26, 1948 (Sunday) ==
- The Hungarian government arrested Cardinal József Mindszenty, an outspoken opponent of the Communist regime, on charges of plotting against the government, spying, treason and black market dealings.
- Born: Chris Chambliss, baseball player, in Dayton, Ohio

== December 27, 1948 (Monday) ==
- Marshal Tito threatened to divert Yugoslavia's resources toward the capitalist West if the Soviet bloc countries persisted in violating their agreements to deliver heavy equipment to help industrialize the country.
- The comedy-drama film The Boy with Green Hair starring Robert Ryan, Pat O'Brien and Dean Stockwell was released.
- Born: Gérard Depardieu, actor, filmmaker and businessman, in Châteauroux, France

== December 28, 1948 (Tuesday) ==
- The Battles of the Sinai began when Israeli forces entered the Sinai Peninsula.
- 1948 Airborne Transport DC-3 (DST) disappearance: A Douglas DST airliner disappeared near the end of a flight from San Juan, Puerto Rico to Miami, Florida with 32 aboard. The plane was never found.
- Born: Mary Weiss, pop singer, in Jamaica, Queens, New York (d. 2024)
- Died: Mahmoud El Nokrashy Pasha, 60 or 61, Prime Minister of Egypt (assassinated)

== December 29, 1948 (Wednesday) ==
- The UN Security Council passed a British resolution demanding another ceasefire in the Negev desert and the establishment of a neutral zone between Israeli and Egyptian forces.
- The first United States Secretary of Defense, James V. Forrestal, in his initial report to President Harry Truman, included a brief item indicating that the earth satellite program, which was being carried out independently by the military services, was assigned to the Committee on Guided Missiles for coordination.
- Born: Peter Robinson, First Minister of Northern Ireland 2008–2016, in Belfast, Northern Ireland

== December 30, 1948 (Thursday) ==
- The Vatican announced the excommunication of all officials involved in the arrest of Cardinal Mindszenty.
- The original Broadway production of Kiss Me, Kate by Bella and Samuel Spewack with music and lyrics by Cole Porter opened at the New Century Theatre.

== December 31, 1948 (Friday) ==
- Chinese Nationalist leader Chiang Kai-shek gave an address clearly indicating that he would be willing to step down and perhaps leave the country if a peace settlement could be reached with the Communists in the Civil War.
- The 100,000th flight of the Berlin Airlift was made.
- Born: Stephen Cleobury, organist and conductor, in Bromley, England (d. 2019); Joe Dallesandro, model and actor, in Pensacola, Florida; Sandy Jardine, footballer, in Edinburgh, Scotland (d. 2014); Donna Summer, singer, in Boston, Massachusetts (d. 2012)
- Died: Malcolm Campbell, 63, English land and water racer
