= David Showell =

Tuskegee Airman and football player (1924–1955)

- Born: David Anthony Showell; October 14, 1924; Prospect Park, Pennsylvania, US
- Died: December 23, 1955 (aged 31); Ridley Park, Pennsylvania, US
- Education: Lafayette College
- Military career
- Allegiance: United States of America
- Branch: United States Army Air Force
- Service years: 1943–1945
- Unit: 332nd Fighter Group
- Awards: Congressional Gold Medal

David Anthony Showell (October 14, 1924 – December 23, 1955) was an American fighter pilot during the Second World War in one of the all-black Tuskegee Airmen squadrons. After the war he was a prominent player for Lafayette College during the 1948 and 1949 football seasons. The Sun Bowl Committee's decision to exclude Showell from the game due to his race led to Lafayette's rejection of its Sun Bowl invitation and subsequent student protests at the college.

== Early life ==
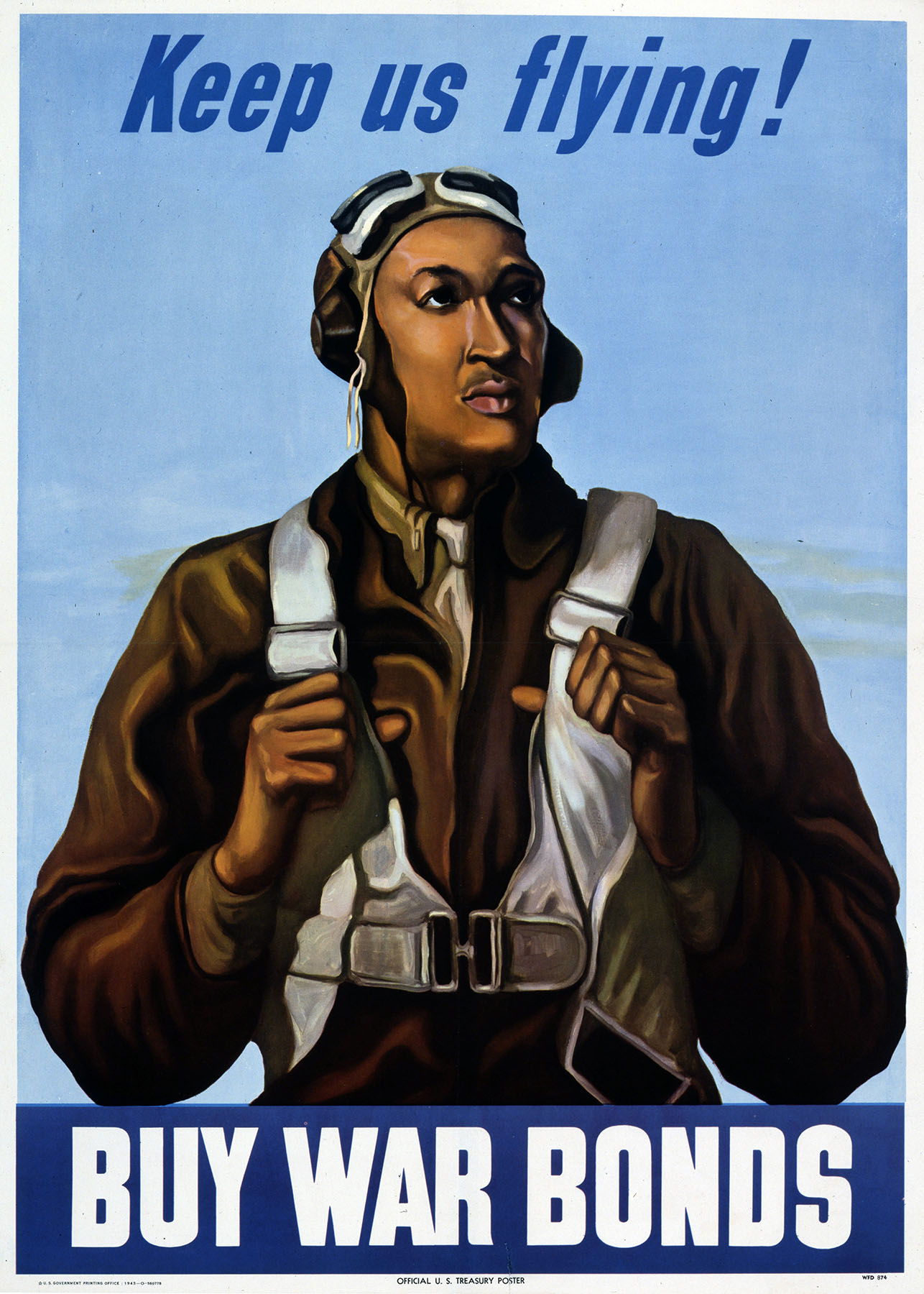
Color poster of a Tuskegee Airman

David Showell was born on October 14, 1924. Showell and his eight siblings spent their childhood at 816 Madison Avenue in Prospect Park, Pennsylvania. During his childhood and adolescent years, Showell attended Lincoln Elementary School, Washington Junior High, and Prospect Park High where he played baseball and football. As a high school senior he excelled in football, and he was the top scorer in Delaware County, Pennsylvania with 135 points during the 1942 season. In the same season, he led his team to three championships: the Suburban Class A and B and the Chester Pike Conference. He was awarded many accolades for his athletic talent and was honored at Ridley Township's annual football banquet when they presented him with a cup for being its most outstanding opponent that season. Showell was also chosen for the All-Delco, All-Scholastic, and All-Suburban teams. The Prospect Park yearbook named him "one of the greatest backs ever to play for Prospect Park High."

== Second World War service ==
After graduating from Prospect Park High in 1943, Showell joined the U.S. Army. During his time in the Army, he attended flight school where he became a member of the Tuskegee Airmen, a unit of black United States Army Air Force pilots during World War II. Showell first experienced significant racial discrimination when he joined the military, where he and his fellow airmen were rarely called into action because of the color of their skin. Showell was discharged from the U.S. Army in October 1945.

== Awards ==
- Congressional Gold Medal awarded to the Tuskegee Airmen in 2006

== College and later life ==
In 1947, Showell began his freshman year at Lafayette College, a small liberal arts college in Easton, Pennsylvania, where he played on the Lafayette Leopards football team for four years, starring at halfback. At the end of the 1948 season, Showell was excluded from an invitation the team received to play in the Sun Bowl in El Paso, Texas on January 1, 1949. This discriminatory event sparked much controversy, not only within Lafayette College, but across the country. Lafayette decided not to send its team to the Sun Bowl in response to the Sun Bowl Committee's decision to exclude Showell from the game due to the segregation laws in Texas, which led to large student protests at the college against racial discrimination.

In 1951, Showell graduated from Lafayette College and earned his bachelor's degree in business. After his undergraduate years, Showell attended the University of Wisconsin Law School.

== Death ==
He was critically injured in a traffic accident on December 23, 1955, when a coal truck he was driving overturned; he died hours later at Taylor Hospital in Ridley Park, Pennsylvania, at the age of 31.

== See also ==
- Dogfights (TV series)
- Executive Order 9981
- Freeman Field Mutiny
- List of Tuskegee Airmen
- Military history of African Americans
- The Tuskegee Airmen (movie)
- Tuskegee Airmen
