= Jenaro Gajardo Vera =

Chilean artist and writer (1919–1998)

Jenaro Gajardo Vera (Traiguén, Malleco Province, Chile, November 18, 1919 – Santo Domingo, San Antonio Province, Chile, May 3, 1998) was a Chilean lawyer, painter and poet. He is most notable for his 1954 claim of ownership of the Moon.

== Biography ==
Jenaro Gajardo Vera was the sixth of ten brothers, son of medic Delfín Gajardo Merino and N. Vera. Although he worked as a painter and poet, Gajardo studied Spanish and law at University of Chile.

In 1951 he moved to Talca to work as a lawyer. While there he founded the Telescopic Interplanetary Society (In Spanish, Sociedad Telescópica Interplanetaria). One of its purposes was to "create a committee to welcome the first extraterrestrial visitors [who arrive on the Earth]". Bishop Manuel Larraín Errázuriz was a member of this Society, and thanks to his participation the organization managed to avoid mocking and criticism from local citizens.

He published two essays, "Algunas cosas sencillas" (Some simple things) and "Copas de fuego" (Cups of fire), and also was the director of Grupos magazine. However, he is mostly known for his lunar claim.

== Registration of the Moon ==
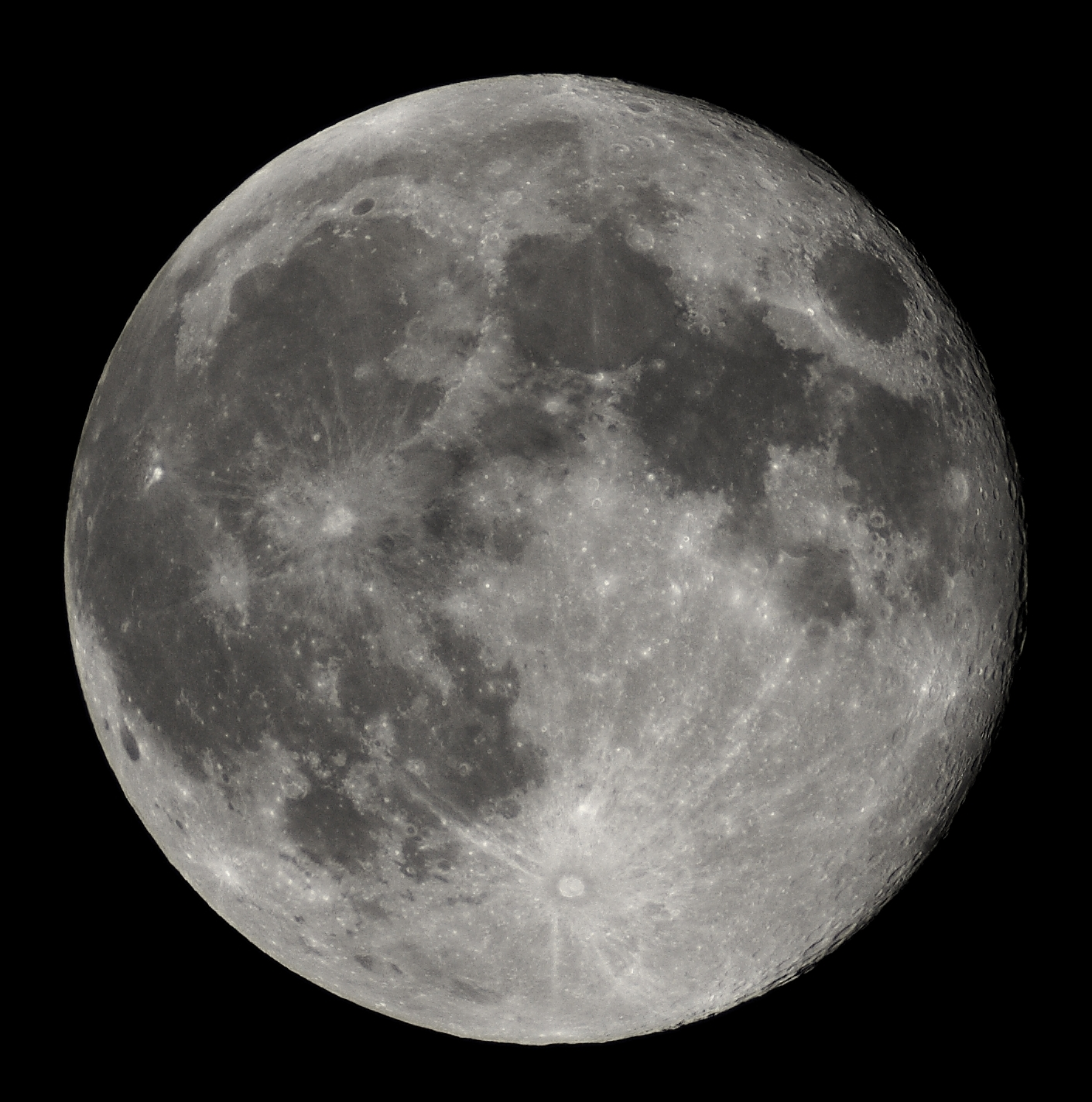
The Moon, registered before a notary by Jenaro Gajardo Vera in 1954

On September 25, 1954, before the notary of Talca, César Jiménez Fuenzalida, Gajardo requested to leave record of his claim as owner of the Moon "from before 1857"—legal formula used back then to get ownership of lands without existing title deeds—by registering a deed:

JENARO GAJARDO VERA, lawyer, poet, is the owner from before the year 1857, adding to the possessions of his ancestors the celestial body and only satellite of the Earth, with a diameter of 3,475.99 kilometers, under the name of Moon, whose boundaries are, due to being an spheroidal body: North, South, East and West: outer space. His place of residence being: Calle 1 Oriente 1270 and his marital status being married. Talca.

— (Signature)
Jenaro Gajardo Vera
RUN 1.487.45-K Ñuñoa
Talca, September 25, 1954.

Following Chilean laws, he published three announcements on the Official Diary of Chile—a requirement adopted in Chile to give anyone possessing any right to ownership of the territory the opportunity to appeal—paying CL$42,000 of the time. As the request was endorsed, he proceeded to inscribe the property in the Real Estate Register, Talca.

=== Goals ===
According to Gajardo, his goals were:

- To make a "poetic protest taking the side of the various potential inhabitants of the satellite," because he wanted a world without jealousy, hate, vices or violence.
- Acquire the Moon "to join the Social Club of Talca, which had a membership requirement of having a property."
