= Ein Hatzeva =

Moshav in southern Israel

Ein Hatzeva: עֵין חֲצֵבָה (Hebrew)
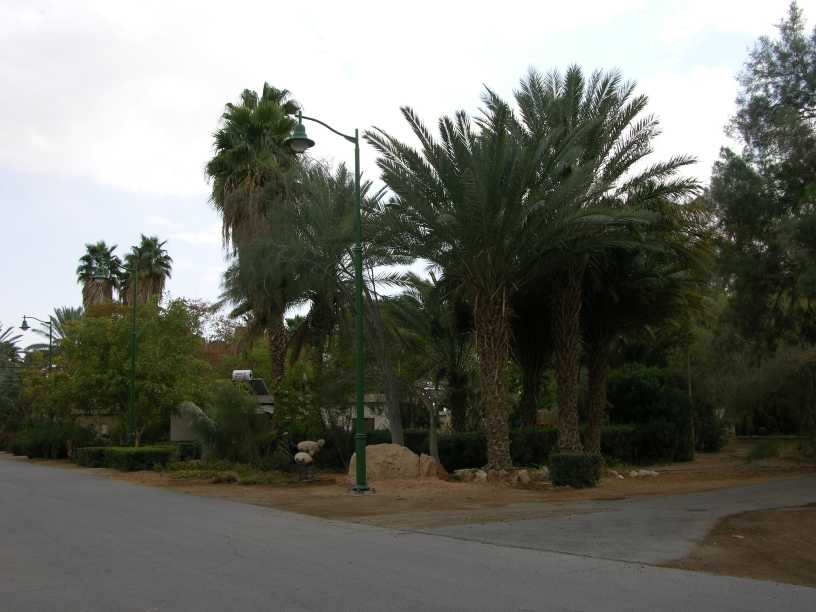
- Etymology: Hatzeva Spring
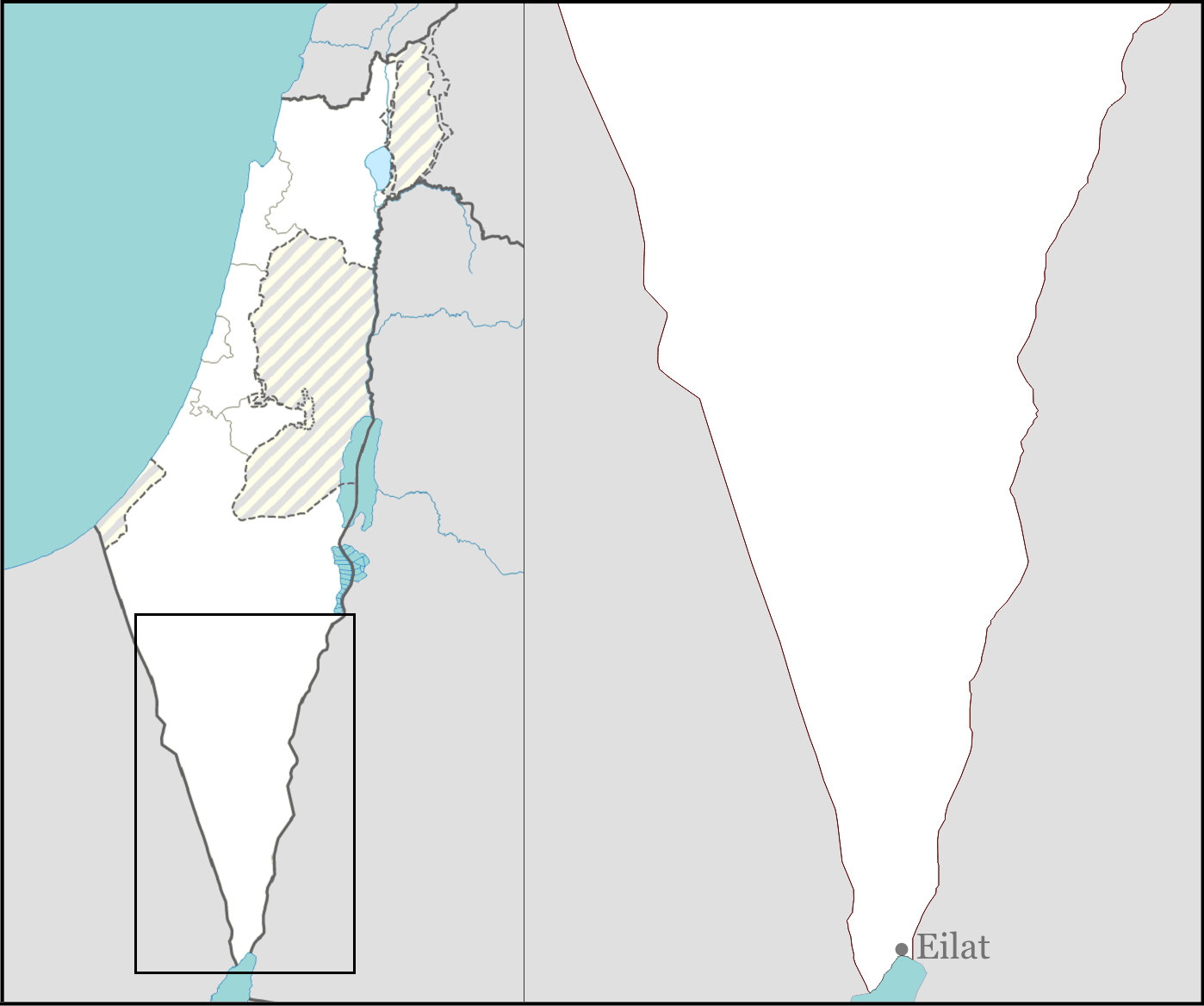
- Location within Southern Negev region of Israel Location within Israel
- Coordinates: 30°47′53″N 35°14′48″E
- Country: Israel
- District: Southern
- Council: Tamar
- Founded: 1960
- Population (2024): 106

Ein Hatzeva (Hebrew: עֵין חֲצֵבָה, lit. Hatzeva Spring) is a moshav in the central Aravah valley in Israel. Located south of the Dead Sea, it falls under the jurisdiction of Tamar Regional Council. In 2024 it had a population of 106.

== Name ==
Moshav Ein Hatzeva was named after the nearby Hatzeva Spring, which in turn takes its name from the Arabic name, Ein Husub. The location was mentioned in Greek texts as Eisebon.

== Archaeology ==
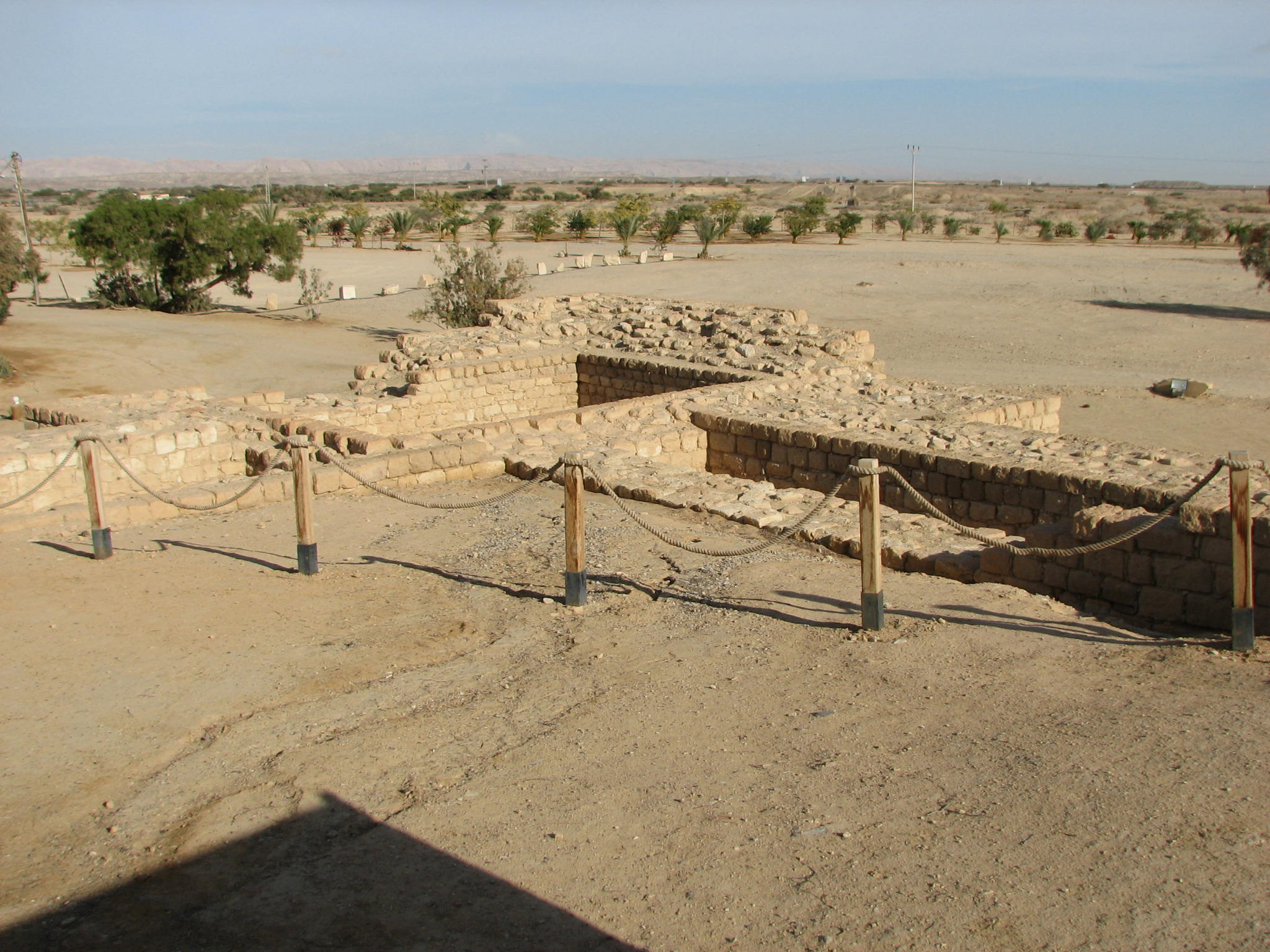
Part of the Limes Arabicus, the Ein Hazeva archeological site has remnants of two Judahite fortresses, a Roman fort, and a Nabataean caravanserai.

The Ein Hazeva archaeological site holds remains of two Judahite fortresses, a Nabataean caravanserai, and a Roman fort, part of the Limes Arabicus. It took advantage of the Spring of Hazeva (in Hebrew Ein Hazeva), a rare water source in the region. It is identified with the biblical site Tamar (1 Kings 9:17–18). According to the Hebrew Bible, it was a Judahite site, but Edomite idols were also discovered there, now on display at the Israel Museum. In the Nabataean period, Hatzeva was a caravanserai along the northern path of the incense route. Later it became a Roman fort, part of the Roman chain of border fortifications facing the desert to the east (the 'Limes Arabicus'). Maaleh-acrabbim, the "ascent of Akrabbim", lit. 'Ascent of the Scorpions', mentioned in Joshua 15:3 and in Num. 34:4, connects it with the Negev plateau; the Roman road along Maaleh-acrabbim, which leads from Hatzeva to Mamshit, is believed to be contemporary with the fort. The site was excavated in the 1980s and yielded finds in six stratified layers.

== History ==
Ein Hatzeva was founded in 1960 as an unaffiliated agriculture farm, and was not recognized by the government. The founders attempted to grow vegetables in the arid Arava area, and the village was recognized upon their success.
