= 1949 Sun Bowl controversy =

Student protests at Lafayette College in Easton, Pennsylvania

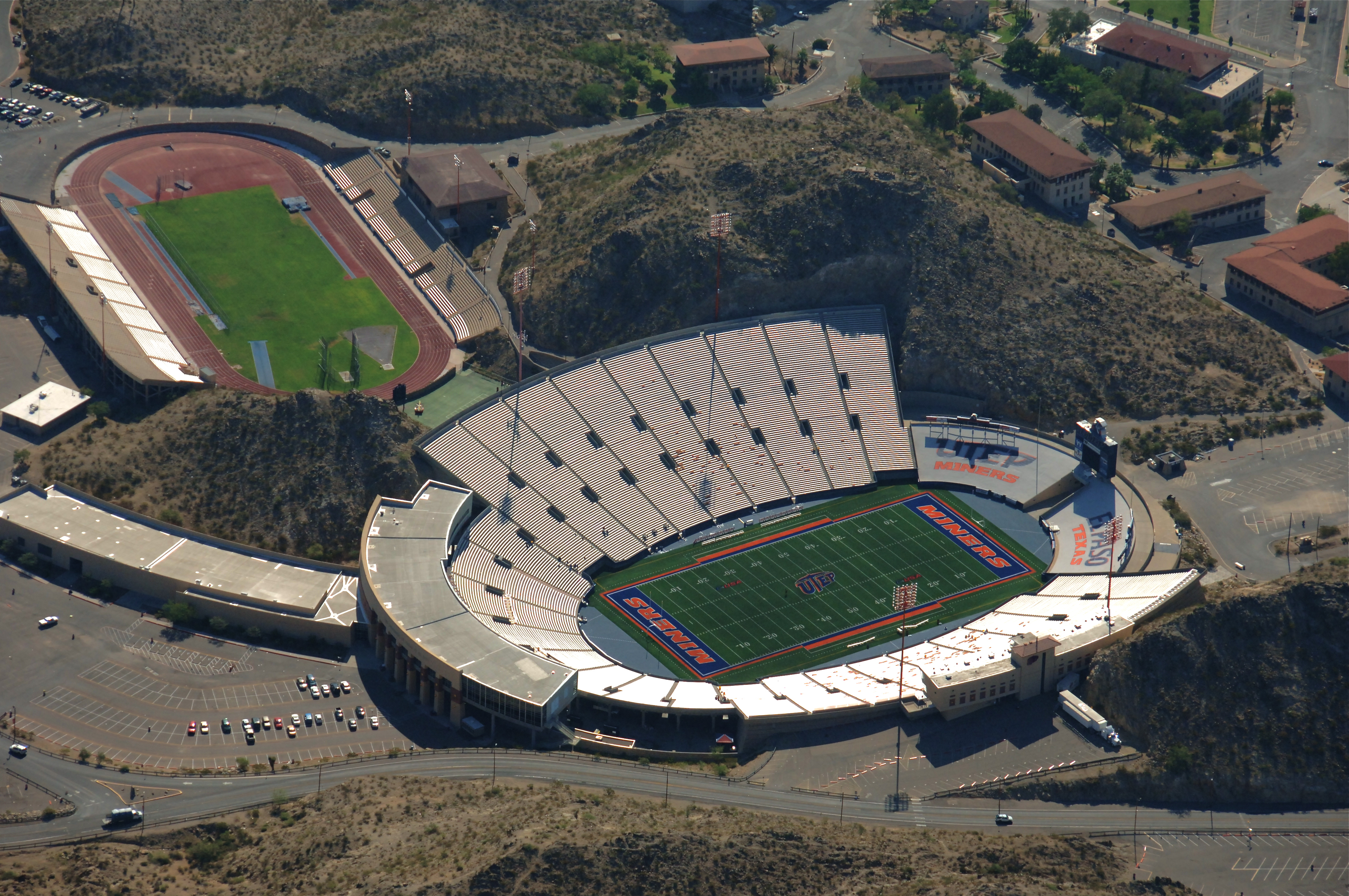
Aerial view of the modern day Sun Bowl stadium on the campus of the University of Texas at El Paso, with Kidd Field, the previous home of the Sun Bowl game, behind it

The 1949 Sun Bowl controversy refers to the student protests at Lafayette College in Easton, Pennsylvania, after a Sun Bowl invitation was extended to the Lafayette Leopards football team under the condition that the African American player, David Showell, would not play.

On November 19, 1948, Lafayette College was invited by the Sun Bowl Committee to play against the Texas College of Mines, now the University of Texas at El Paso. Just four days later, on November 23, the Lafayette faculty voted to turn down the bid because the Sun Bowl Committee would not allow Showell to play. This bid rejection led to a large student demonstration on the Lafayette campus and in the city of Easton against segregation.

West Virginia University later accepted the bid after Lafayette's rejection. The 1949 Sun Bowl was played on January 1, 1949. West Virginia defeated the Texas College of Mines by a score of 21–12.

== Sun Bowl segregation history ==
The segregation policies of the Sun Bowl were in effect from the first edition of the game—played on January 1, 1935, in El Paso, Texas—through the 1940s. This was not unique to bowl games; for example, in 1946 it led to the Penn State Nittany Lions cancelling a regular season away game against the Miami Hurricanes. Penn State's two African American players, Wallace Triplett and Dennis Hoggard, would not have been able to participate due to Florida's police department rules, and the "incidents" that were expected to occur if they were allowed to play. This reasoning was consistent with the Sun Bowl and other major bowl games of the 1940s. It was not until the 1946 game cancellation that people began to put forth the argument that "the ideals of democracy are more important than any football game." Another game cancellation occurred in 1947, when the Rollins Tars of Winter Park, Florida, scrapped their homecoming game against the Ohio Wesleyan Battling Bishops. The Ohio team included an African American player, and although Rollins had "no objections whatsoever" to playing the game, they cancelled the game after "consulting leading white and negro residents" in their area.

The Sun Bowl was established in the mid-1930s along with the Cotton Bowl in Dallas, the Orange Bowl in Miami, and the Sugar Bowl in New Orleans. While the Sun Bowl historically followed the southern racial segregation policies, the 1949 Sun Bowl made a major contribution to the future desegregation of college sports.

== 1948 Lafayette football season ==
The 1948 season was one of the most successful years for the Lafayette College football team. Led by captain Danny Kovacs and standout running back David Showell, the team had a record of seven wins and two losses. After starting the year beating Fordham University by a score of 53–14, Lafayette suffered a large loss in its following game at Army, losing 54–7. The Leopards then won each of their next four games by an average scoring margin of 26 points, but they soon lost to Rutgers University by three touchdowns. After defeating Ohio Wesleyan, Lafayette set itself up for a crucial bout against its rival, Lehigh University. However, on November 19, 1948, a day before the game against Lehigh, Lafayette received a phone call from the Sun Bowl Committee inviting the team to participate in the bowl game. This invitation essentially rendered Lafayette's season finale and rivalry game against Lehigh meaningless. Nevertheless, Lafayette went on to defeat Lehigh by a score of 23–13, capping off the regular season.

== David Showell ==
David Showell

David Showell, an African American, was a prominent player for Lafayette during the 1948 football season. The Sun Bowl Committee's decision to exclude Showell from the game due to his race led to Lafayette's rejection of its Sun Bowl invitation and the subsequent student protests at the college.

== Student demonstrations at Lafayette ==
On November 23, 1948, the Lafayette College faculty held a meeting to vote upon whether or not to accept the football team's invitation to the Sun Bowl. The faculty voted to turn down the bid as a result of the Sun Bowl Committee's decision to exclude David Showell. The formal announcement of the rejection that was made by college officials did not contain a reason for vetoing the Sun Bowl bid. The Lafayette students, who were excited to see their football team go to the Sun Bowl, were disheartened by the announcement and made it their goal to discover the reason behind the school's abrupt change in plans.

At approximately seven o'clock on the night of November 23, the news began to spread around the Lafayette campus as a caravan of students traversed the school grounds to recruit more protesters. Soon after, a mass of nearly 1,000 students holding flaming newspapers in hand made its way to the college's central quadrangle, which housed the materials for a bonfire. This bonfire was previously constructed for a pep rally to be held before the football game against Lafayette's rival, Lehigh University, but was never used due to a rain storm. Therefore, the student mob ignited the fire to continue its demonstration.

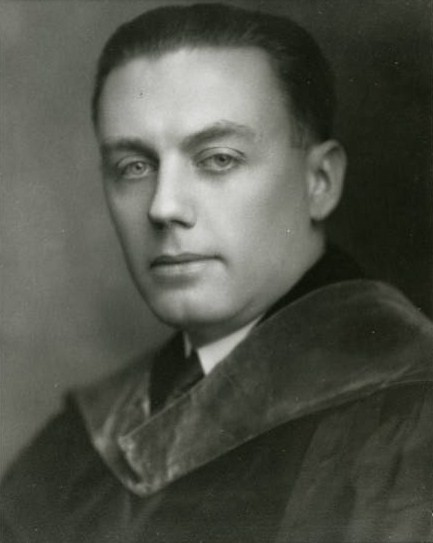
The President of Lafayette College (1945–1957), Ralph Cooper Hutchison

The students then visited the home of Ralph Cooper Hutchison, the president of Lafayette College. Upon their arrival, President Hutchison told the students that David Showell was not invited to play in the bowl game because he was an African American. Hutchison further explained that the Sun Bowl Committee's decision to exclude Showell ultimately led to the faculty's rejection of the bowl game bid. The student protestors asked that a conditional acceptance be made to the bid as long as they allowed David Showell to play.

Athletic Director Bill Anderson, who had arrived at Hutchison's house, agreed to place a call to C. D. Belding, the chairman of the Sun Bowl Committee in El Paso, Texas. During the call the athletic director stated, "We want a waiver on Showell. He was a lieutenant in the Army and served in Texas. He wants the boys to go without him, but the College couldn't take that responsibility. We are anxious to accept. If Showell can't play, we wouldn't be able to accept. So it can't be done?" Despite the call, Belding still would not let Showell play.

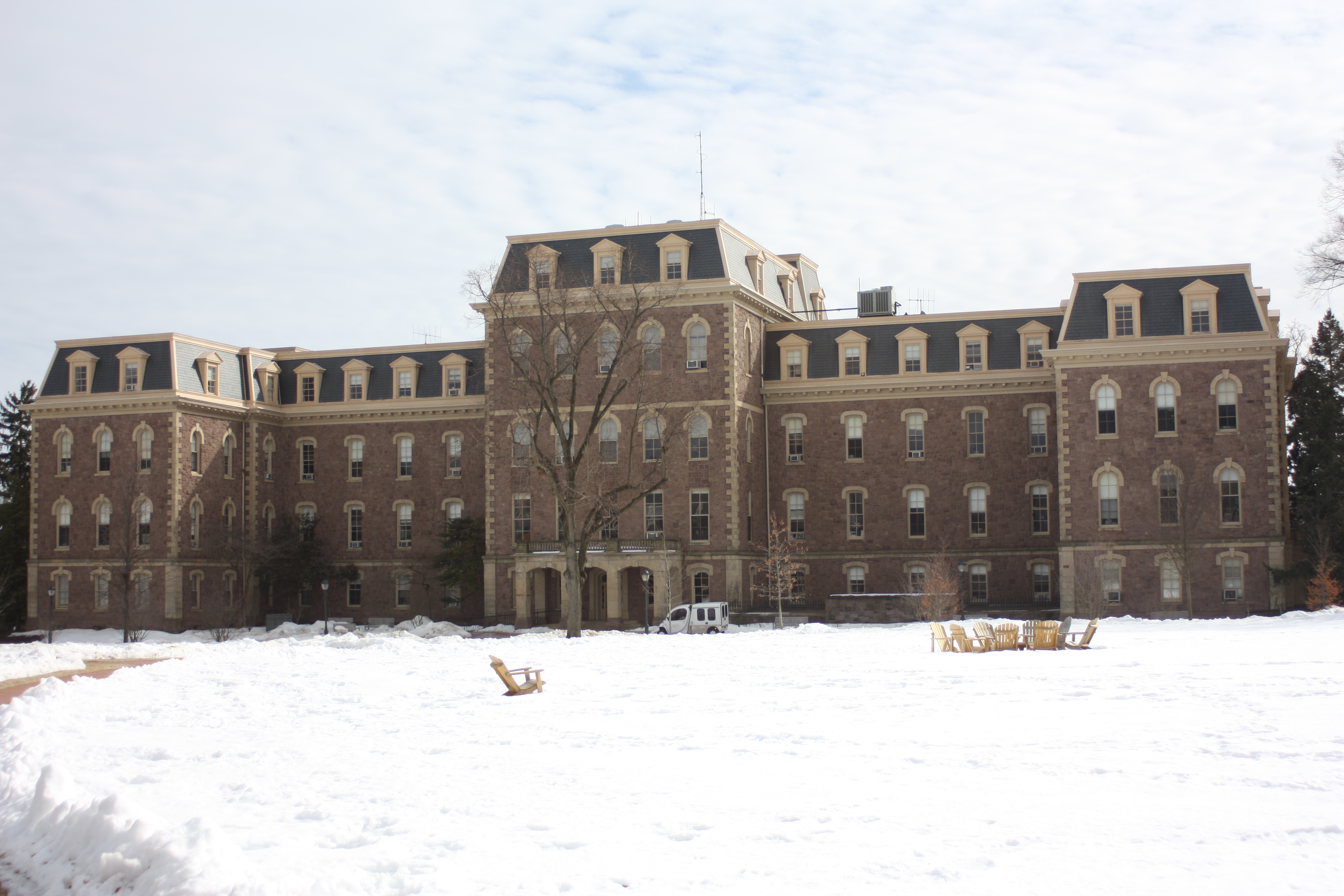
Pardee Hall, Lafayette College

Upon hearing that the answer was still "No" over 1000 frustrated Lafayette students marched to the Centre Square in downtown Easton and held a protest rally against racial intolerance. A number of students rushed to the local Western Union office to wire the news of their protests to prominent individuals to denounce the Sun Bowl Committee's refusal to include Showell. One of the recipients was President Truman. The telegram to Truman read: "Denied Sun Bowl game because we have a Negro on our team. Is that democracy?", signed by the Lafayette College students. Other telegrams were sent to Walter Winchell to join the cause.

Following the telegram sent to President Truman, the Lafayette students broke up their rally and ended the protest in downtown Easton. On the following day, November 24, at 9:30 in the morning, the students assembled once again at Lafayette College's Pardee Hall. Approximately 1,000 students congregated to pass a formal resolution stating their opposition to racial discrimination. The student's resolution stated: "We protest the racial discrimination against one of our fellow students and declare without equivocation our firm resolve that all Americans have equal rights under the law." Subsequently, they informed the media to cover their civil rights resolution.

== Coverage in the press ==
Newspapers shed light on the controversy surrounding the 1949 Sun Bowl in November 1948. The press conveyed conflicting accounts as to why Lafayette College turned down the invitation to play the 1949 Sun Bowl against the Texas Miners. Lafayette College officials maintained that their rejection of the invitation was due in large part to the discrimination against the team's black football player, David Showell, saying that Texas law forbade the halfback's participation in the New Year's Day bowl game. An article in The New York Times quoted Dr. Ralph C. Hutchison, president of the college at the time, saying that "I must state emphatically that the acting president of the Texas College of Mines and C. D. Belding, chairman of the Sun Bowl Committee, each informed us repeatedly that Showell could not play in the proposed game."

According to another newspaper article, Sun Bowl Committee chairman, C. D. Belding, offered another side of the story refuting President Hutchison's claims and stating that Lafayette College jumped to a conclusion too soon. Belding explained that Texas law did not bar Showell from the field to play. Some papers went into great detail regarding the technicalities that Texas Miners officials claimed Lafayette College simply got wrong. An article by The Corsicana Daily Sun on November 24, 1948, stated that the law in question only required Negro players to have a separate lodging. According to The Abilene Reporter, on the evening of November 26, 1948, "The [El Paso] Times believes the officials of Lafayette College injected the Negro question into the Sun Bowl picture unfairly," going on to say that "Lafayette merely rejected the bid on the grounds that it was impractical to accept it."

In other articles, more focus was placed on the fact that Sun Bowl officials reached out to other schools of interest upon receiving Lafayette College's original rejection of the bid. As seen in the article by Amarillo Daily News on November 24, 1948, rather than calling out Lafayette's claim as a fallacy, the paper focused on the fact that no further arrangements could be made with Lafayette College once Texas Miners officials had already reached out to the other schools.

== Impact on college football ==
=== Desegregation of the Sun Bowl ===
The events at Lafayette College created a significant amount of media buzz on a national scale. Lafayette's withdrawal from the Sun Bowl was enough to get the residents of El Paso to fight against racial exclusion in the bowl game. The Lafayette Leopards were not the only team to face racism in El Paso. In September 1950, a regular season game between Loyola University (Los Angeles) (now Loyola Marymount University) and the Texas College of Mines was canceled because of the policy that excluded black players from playing in El Paso. Finally on October 27, 1950, officials took a vote that allowed the Texas college to include black players in games at the El Paso location. A year after the grant was passed, the Sun Bowl hosted its first integrated football game between the College of the Pacific (now University of the Pacific) and Texas Tech University.

=== Integration of college football ===
The Sun Bowl was not the only bowl game to involve racial exclusion. Many football games during the twentieth century affected the integration of collegiate football and sports in general: in addition to Lafayette, there were games played at The University of California, Los Angeles (1938–1941), Drake University (1948–1952), Georgia Tech (1954–1956), and the University of Wyoming (1967–1970) that led to integrated football games. At the time, these schools conducted studies to monitor the treatment of African American players and how the schools reacted to certain situations involving segregation and prejudice. The teams that were in favor of African Americans participating in football gave players a chance to speak out against the racism that took place in the sport. As a result of protests and communities coming together to support black football players, college football slowly became integrated.

== References in media ==
Terry Kitchen is a folk singer-songwriter who grew up in Easton, Pennsylvania, during the 1960s. His time spent there inspired him to write the song "The Greatest Game They Never Played" on the album That's How It Used To Be. The song, written about the Lafayette College football team and community, discusses the incidents that took place before the Sun Bowl. He includes references to Lafayette's refusal to play in the bowl game, the student protest against segregation, and the phone call between Lafayette's president and the Sun Bowl Committee in El Paso, Texas.
