= Battle of Jiulianshan =

1948 battle

Coordinates: 24.5680°N 114.458°E

- Part of the Chinese Civil War
Date	November 15, 1948 – January 11, 1949
Location	Guangdong, China
Result	Communist victory

Belligerents
National Revolutionary Army	People's Liberation Army

Commanders and leaders
?	?

Strength
2,500	1,000

Casualties and losses
550+	Minor

The Battle of Jiulianshan (Jiulianshan Zhandou, 九连山战斗) was an unsuccessful counter-guerrilla operation launched by the Nationalists against the Communists during the Chinese Civil War after World War II, in the border region of Guangdong, Jiangxi and Hunan.

Jiulianshan (Jiulian Mountain, Shan means mountain in Chinese), was a Communist guerrilla base in the border region of Guangdong, Jiangxi and Hunan. In November 1948, the Nationalist forces from Guangdong including 13th Security Regiment, the 5th Regiment, and a battalion of the 1st Security Regiment, were dispatched to eradicate the local Communist guerrilla. The Nationalists enjoyed both the technical and numerical superiority, so they decided to attack on multiple fronts in separate directions. In contrast, the Communist guerrilla decided to concentrate their forces to achieve numerical superiority on one front against the attacking Nationalists, and then fight the enemy at the next front using the same tactic to overcome their own disadvantage.

Order of battle

- Nationalists (2,500+ total)
  - A battalion of the Cantonese 1st Security Regiment
  - Cantonese 5th Security Regiment
  - Cantonese 13th Security Regiment
- Communists (1,000+ total)
  - 3rd Regiment (battalion-sized) of the Communist guerrilla
  - 4th Regiment (battalion-sized) of the Communist guerrilla
  - 7th Regiment (battalion-sized) of the Communist guerrilla
  - Independent 5th Group (battalion-sized) of the Communist guerrilla

== Ambush at the Dongjiang River ==
As the nationalists sent their supplies via Dongjiang River upstream from Heyuan (河源) on November 15, 1948, the enemy set up an ambush in the section from Yellow Field (Huang Tian, 黄田) region to White Horse (Bai Ma, 白马) region. The entire nationalist convoy was lost with over 70 troops killed and over a dozen boats full of supplies having fallen into enemy hands.

On November 20, 1948, a group of communist guerrillas staged a feigned attack on Great Lake (Da Hu, 大湖) region, and as the nationalist 1st Security Regiment sent out a company to engage the enemy, the enemy immediately retreated, lured the unsuspecting nationalists into the preset ambush in the Lion's Brain (Shi Zi Nao, 狮子脑) mountains, where the communist guerrilla 3rd Regiment was waiting, and the entire nationalist company was wiped out.

=== Resupply Effort and Second Ambush ===
Due to the previous loss of supplies in November of the previous year, the nationalists were forced to re-supply. On January 8, 1949, 5 infantry companies and one artillery company of the nationalist 13th Security Regiment totaling 600 troops organized another convoy consisting of three supply boats that went upstream again on the Dongjiang River. The Communist guerillas concentrated their 3rd Regiment, 5th Regiment, 7th Regiment, and Independent 5th Group totaling 1,000 troops, to ambush the convoy while the Nationalists were stopped at the riverbank. On January 11, 1949, after a fierce nine-hour-long battle that lasted from noon till 9:00 PM, the Nationalists managed to successfully break out, but all of the suppliers had lost to the enemy, in addition to suffering over 190 fatalities. After this setback, the Nationalists canceled any further plans to eradicate the Communist guerrillas and withdrew all their deployed forces.

== Reasons for Nationalist Failure ==
The Nationalist failure was mainly due to their grave underestimation of the enemy's strength and determination. Although the so-called Communist guerrilla regiments were actually only battalion-sized, they still formed a sizable and formidable force when concentrated. In contrast, although the Nationalist enjoyed both the technical and numerical superiority, they did not have advantage when their forces were deployed separately in smaller numbers.

== See also ==
- Outline of the Chinese Civil War
- National Revolutionary Army
- History of the People's Liberation Army
