= 1948 United States Virgin Islands referendum =

Ballot measure in the US Virgin Islands

A referendum on councils and treasury was held in the United States Virgin Islands on 2 November 1948. Governor William H. Hastie had requested the local parliament to draw up six referendum questions. While this referendum was held alongside elections, turnout was only 60% that of the general election.

== Results ==
=== Territorial Legislature ===
Do you favor the creation of a single Legislature for the Virgin Islands?

Choice	Votes	%
Yes	636	40.25
No	944	59.75
Invalid/blank votes		–
Total	1,580	100
Registered voters/turnout	5,509	
Source: Direct Democracy

=== Independent Councils ===
Do you favor two separate municipal Councils as at present?

Choice	Votes	%
Yes	1,096	70.39
No	461	29.16
Invalid/blank votes		–
Total	1,557	100
Registered voters/turnout	5,509	
Source: Direct Democracy

=== Common Treasury ===
Do you favor the creation of single treasury for the Virgin Islands?

Choice	Votes	%
Yes	586	40.44
No	863	59.56
Invalid/blank votes		–
Total	1,449	100
Registered voters/turnout	5,509	
Source: Direct Democracy

=== Separate Treasuries ===
Do you favor two separate municipal treasuries for the Virgin Islands?

Choice	Votes	%
Yes	1,035	70.79
No	427	29.21
Invalid/blank votes		–
Total	1,462	100
Registered voters/turnout	5,509	
Source: Direct Democracy

=== Popular election of the Governor ===
Do you favor the election of the Governor by the people of the Virgin Islands?

Choice	Votes	%
Yes	463	23.23
No	1,530	76.77
Invalid/blank votes		–
Total	1,993	100
Registered voters/turnout	5,509	
Source: Direct Democracy

=== Representative in US Congress ===
Do you favor a Resident Commissioner from the Virgin Islands in the Congress of the United States?

Choice	Votes	%
Yes	2,194	88.47
No	286	11.53
Invalid/blank votes		–
Total	2,480	100
Registered voters/turnout	5,509	
Source: Direct Democracy
