= Nation of Celestial Space =

Micronation

- Micronation (unrecognized entity)
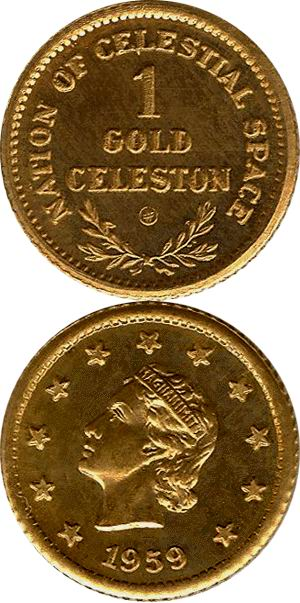
- The obverse of this 1959 solid gold 1 Celeston coin features the profile of Ruth Mangan as the allegorical figure "Magnanimity".
- Area claimed: Entire universe (excluding Earth)
- Claimed by: James T. Mangan
- Dates claimed: 1 January 1949

The Nation of Celestial Space (also known as Celestia) is a micronation created by James Thomas Mangan. Celestia comprised the entirety of "outer space", which Mangan laid claim to on behalf of humanity to ensure that no one country might establish a political hegemony there. As "Founder and First Representative", he registered this acquisition with the Recorder of Deeds and Titles of Cook County on January 1, 1949. At its foundation Celestia claimed to have 19 members, among them Mangan's daughter Ruth; a decade later a booklet published by the group claimed that membership had grown to 19,057.

Mangan was active for many years in pursuing his claims on behalf of Celestia; in 1949 he notified the United States, Soviet Union, United Kingdom and United Nations that Celestia had banned all further atmospheric nuclear tests. Later, as the space race got underway in earnest he sent angry letters of protest to the leaders of the Soviet Union and United States on the occasions that their early space flights encroached upon his claimed territory - although he later waived these proscriptions for satellite launches by the latter.

Despite these efforts, the Nation of Celestial Space is thought to have become defunct with the death of its founder. Its only surviving legacy is the series of stamps and silver and gold coins and passports issued in its name by Mangan from the late 1950s through to the mid-1960s.

James Thomas Mangan's descendants include his son, James C. Mangan (deceased), his daughter Ruth Mangan Stump, "Princess of the Nation of Celestial Space" (deceased), and three grandsons, Glen Stump, "Duke of Mars", Dean Stump, "Duke of Selenia " and “First Representative of The Nation of Celestial Space, and Todd Stump, "Duke of the Milky Way". There are also three sons of Glen Stump, Edward Stump “Duke of Sirius”, Dan Stump “Duke of Polaris” and Luke Walter Stump “Duke of Alpha Centauri”.

== Declaration ==
The Declaration by the Nation of Celestial Space was issued by Celestia on December 21, 1948. It proclaims to establish the nation to "secure for sympathetic people, wherever they may live, the beauties and benefits of a vast domain yet unclaimed by any state or nation." The document goes on to explain the nature of Celestia's claim.

== See also ==
- List of micronations
- Asgardia
