= James T. Mangan =

James T. Mangan (1896–1970) was an eccentric, public relations man and writer on self-help topics who publicly claimed ownership of outer space in 1948.

Mangan founded what he called the Nation of Celestial Space and registered it with the Recorder of Deeds and Titles of Cook County, Illinois, on January 1, 1949. Eventually, the Nation claimed 100,000 members and in 1958, Mangan applied for membership in the United Nations and erected a flag outside the headquarters of the United Nations in New York City before millions of television viewers. He consistently and stubbornly insisted that Celestia - his nickname for the Nation of Celestial Space - was a legal and valid micronation, going so far as to issue passports to astronauts and protest the incursions of satellites on his domain.

In his book The Secret of Perfect Living, Mangan created a psychological system slightly resembling transcendental meditation, in which readers were encouraged to engage their subconscious minds and obtain specific mental states by focusing their attention on mantra-like one-word affirmations called switchwords; for example, focusing on "GIGGLE" would be useful "to get in mood for writing."
