= June 1949 =

Month of 1949

<<	June 1949					>>
Su	Mo	Tu	We	Th	Fr	Sa
			1	2	3	4
5	6	7	8	9	10	11
12	13	14	15	16	17	18
19	20	21	22	23	24	25
26	27	28	29	30

The following events occurred in June 1949:

== June 1, 1949 (Wednesday) ==
- General Sir Brian Robertson was named the first British High Commissioner for Germany.
- KSL-TV went on the air as the first commercial television station in the state of Utah.
- Born: Mu Tiezhu, basketball player and coach, in Dongming County, Shandong, China (d. 2008)
- Died: Khalil Mutran, 76, Egyptian poet and journalist

== June 2, 1949 (Thursday) ==
- The striking non-Communist Berlin railway workers overwhelmingly rejected a compromise wage offer by the Soviet railway management and voted to continue their thirteen-day-old walkout.
- Born: Heather Couper, astronomer, in Wallasey, England (d. 2020)
- Died: Radu R. Rosetti, 72, Romanian general and military historian (died in prison)

== June 3, 1949 (Friday) ==
- Testifying at the trial of Alger Hiss, Whittaker Chambers admitted under cross-examination that he had lied to the FBI and the House Un-American Activities Committee in previous statements about Communist spy activities in the United States.
- In New York, three of the eleven defendants in the Smith Act trial (John Gates, Henry Winston and Gus Hall) were sent to jail by Judge Harold Medina for contempt of court.
- The official gazette of King Abdullah cleared up confusion about his country's name by announcing that it had been changed from Transjordan to the Hashemite Kingdom of Jordan. The name change had been decided upon in December but international press coverage had continued to refer to the country as Transjordan because it was not known when the change had become official.
- Mickey Rooney married actress Martha Vickers just hours after picking up his final divorce papers from his second wife Betty Jane Rase.
- The police procedural drama series Dragnet premiered on NBC Radio. The program would later be made into a popular TV series running from 1951 to 1959.
- The mystery film Take One False Step starring William Powell and Shelley Winters premiered in Los Angeles.
- Died: Carlo Angela, 74, Italian doctor

== June 4, 1949 (Saturday) ==
- Former Vice President and 1948 third-party candidate Henry A. Wallace issued a statement condemning Judge Medina's jailing of the three Communist defendants, claiming it "violates every American concept of fair play, and in my judgement is the use of the power of the court to promote injustice."
- Spyridon Vlachos was elected Archbishop of Athens and All Greece.
- Nimbus won the Epsom Derby in the first photo finish in the history of the famous horse race.
- Died: Maurice Blondel, 87, French philosopher

== June 5, 1949 (Sunday) ==
- Canada and the United States announced a new commercial aviation agreement giving Canadian airlines new routes through the US in exchange for continued American use of the airfield in Gander, Newfoundland for transatlantic flights.
- Baseball Commissioner Happy Chandler declared that 18 players suspended for joining the Mexican League in 1946 (including Mickey Owen, Max Lanier and Lou Klein) were eligible for reinstatement.
- Orapin Chaiyakan was elected to the House of Representatives of Thailand, making her the first woman to hold a post in the Parliament of Thailand.
- The comedy-drama film Sorrowful Jones starring Bob Hope and Lucille Ball was released.

== June 6, 1949 (Monday) ==
- The Senate Judiciary Committee in Washington passed an anti-lynching bill providing a maximum penalty of a $10,000 fine or twenty years' imprisonment, or both, for conspiracy to incite, aid or commit a lynching. A lynching victim, or his next of kin, would also be entitled to file civil damage suits against those responsible for the lynching.
- The United States launched a primate named Albert II into space; the subject died on impact.
- Sale of alcohol became legal in Kansas for the first time in 69 years.

== June 7, 1949 (Tuesday) ==
- Strato-Freight Curtiss C-46A crash: A Curtiss C-46 transport plane crashed into the Atlantic Ocean en route from Puerto Rico to Miami, Florida due to a maintenance error. 53 of the 81 aboard were killed.
- US President Harry S. Truman urged Congress to appropriate $150 million for economic aid to South Korea during the next year, calling Korea "a testing ground in which the validity and practical value of the ideals and principles of democracy which the Republic is putting into practice are being matched against the practices of communism which have been imposed upon the people of north Korea."
- Continuing his testimony at the Alger Hiss trial, Whittaker Chambers said that he had perjured himself repeatedly in hearings to protect Hiss and other friends.

== June 8, 1949 (Wednesday) ==
- George Orwell's dystopian novel Nineteen Eighty-Four was published in the United Kingdom.
- The California Senate Factfinding Subcommittee on Un-American Activities released a 709-page report accusing a number of prominent writers and entertainers of following "the Communist party line program over a long period of time." Among the hundreds of persons listed were Pearl S. Buck, Charlie Chaplin, Helen Gahagan Douglas, Lillian Hellman, Katharine Hepburn, Thomas Mann, Dashiell Hammett, Danny Kaye, Gene Kelly, Fredric March, Dorothy Parker and Orson Welles.
- Born: Emanuel Ax, classical pianist, in Lviv, Ukrainian SSR, Soviet Union
- Died: Naguib el-Rihani, 60, Egyptian actor

== June 9, 1949 (Thursday) ==
- The US attempted to break a six-week deadlock in the UN-sponsored Palestine peace talks in Lausanne, Switzerland by urging the Israelis to abandon their opposition to a general return of Palestinian Arab refugees and concede some land to the Arabs.
- US Representative Helen Gagahan Douglas condemned the California Senate Subcommittee report and its chairman Jack Tenney, declaring that he was "undermining our form of government when he attempts to make people believe that liberalism and communism are synonymous." Several other persons named in the report also criticized it in the press, including Danny Kaye who said he'd never heard of the committee before but that "it sounds to me like a lot of hooey."
- Fashion icon Nancy "Slim" Keith received a divorce from film director Howard Hawks.
- Died: Maria Cebotari, 39, Austrian soprano and actress (cancer)

== June 10, 1949 (Friday) ==
- Automobile designer Preston Tucker and seven others connected to his company were indicted by a federal grand jury for fraud. The indictment stated that none of the cars of Tucker Corporation had the engineering features that Tucker claimed they would.
- The baseball-themed comedy film It Happens Every Spring starring Ray Milland, Jean Peters and Paul Douglas premiered in New York City.
- Born: Kevin Corcoran, child actor, television director and film producer, in Santa Monica, California (d. 2015); Bora Dugić, flautist, in Đurđevo, SR of Serbia, Yugoslavia
- Died: Filippo Silvestri, 75, Italian entomologist; Sigrid Undset, 67, Norwegian novelist; Carl Vaugoin, 75, Austrian politician

== June 11, 1949 (Saturday) ==
- US and Russian authorities reached a tentative agreement on the Berlin railway workers' strike, permitting workers living in West Berlin to receive 60% of their pay in West German marks.
- Czechoslovakia announced the breaking off of trade relations with Yugoslavia.
- Born: Frank Beard, drummer of the rock band ZZ Top, in Frankston, Texas; Ingrid Newkirk, animal rights activist, in Surrey, England
- Died: Giovanni Gioviale, 63, Italian composer

== June 12, 1949 (Sunday) ==
- The University of California, Berkeley announced that its Board of Regents would require all 4,000 of its faculty members to swear an oath disclaiming support for "any party or organization that believes in, advocates or teaches the overthrow of the Government of the United States by force or by any illegal unconstitutional methods."
- Born: John Wetton, singer, bassist and songwriter (King Crimson, Uriah Heep, Asia), in Willington, Derbyshire, England (d. 2017)
- Died: Maria Candida of the Eucharist, 65, Italian nun

== June 13, 1949 (Monday) ==
- Municipal elections were held in the Free Territory of Trieste, won by parties that favored the city's reunification with Italy.
- The US Circuit Court of Appeals in Washington upheld the contempt of Congress convictions of film writers Dalton Trumbo and John Howard Lawson, ruling that the House Un-American Activities Committee had the right to demand that witnesses state whether or not they were Communists.
- Born: Ann Druyan, science writer, in Queens, New York; Red Symons, musician and media personality, in Brighton, England

== June 14, 1949 (Tuesday) ==
- Philadelphia Phillies first baseman Eddie Waitkus was shot and wounded in his Chicago hotel room by deranged fan Ruth Ann Steinhagen in one of the earliest recognized cases of criminal stalking.
- Albert II became the first mammal and primate in space when the V-2 rocket he was riding in breached the Kármán line, though he died on impact after a parachute failure.
- Born: Carlos María Abascal Carranza, lawyer and politician, in Mexico City (d. 2008); Harry Turtledove, fantasy and science fiction novelist, in Los Angeles, California; Papa Wemba, singer and musician, in Lubefu, Belgian Congo (d. 2016)

== June 15, 1949 (Wednesday) ==
- The US, British and French authorities gave West Berlin control over almost all government activities except those involving foreign or security issues.
- The New Taiwan dollar was first issued.
- Born: Dusty Baker, baseball player and manager, as Johnnie Baker in Riverside, California; Russell Hitchcock, soft rock singer (Air Supply), in Melbourne, Australia; Jim Varney, actor and comedian best known for playing Ernest P. Worrell, in Lexington, Kentucky (d. 2000)
- Died: Nig Clarke, 66, Canadian baseball player

== June 16, 1949 (Thursday) ==
- President Truman criticized the wave of spy trials and loyalty inquiries for producing a nationwide hysteria.
- Singer Paul Robeson, returning from a four-month tour of Europe and the Soviet Union, called the New York trial of communist leaders a "type of domestic fascism."
- Born: Robbin Thompson, singer-songwriter, in Boston, Massachusetts (d. 2015)

== June 17, 1949 (Friday) ==
- The Chinese Communists reopened the port of Shanghai to international traffic after sweeping the area for mines.
- The Manchester Mark 1 reached a new milestone for computers when it completed nine error-free hours running a program written to search for Mersenne primes.

== June 18, 1949 (Saturday) ==
- The Hungarian government announced the arrest of former foreign minister László Rajk and 19 other officials accused of being "spies and Trotskyist agents of foreign imperialist powers."
- Born: Jarosław Kaczyński and Lech Kaczyński (d. 2010), identical twin politicians, in Warsaw, Poland; Lincoln Thompson, reggae musician, in Kingston, Jamaica (d. 1999)

== June 19, 1949 (Sunday) ==
- Mao Zedong made a speech at a session of the Political Consultative Conference preparatory commission saying that the war had been won and that he was willing to negotiate with any nation that severed ties with the Nationalist government.
- The French Indian enclave of Chandannagar voted to join the Domain of India.
- The Inaugural NASCAR Strictly Stock Series Race was held at the Charlotte Speedway in Charlotte, North Carolina. Glenn Dunaway initially claimed victory but was later disqualified due to illegal springs and the race awarded to Jim Roper.
- Born: Hassan Shehata, footballer and coach, in Kafr El Dawwar, Egypt
- Died: Syed Zafarul Hasan, 63, Muslim philosopher

== June 20, 1949 (Monday) ==
- The Paris Foreign Ministers Conference ended after four weeks with no agreement on any important issues concerning Germany or Berlin.
- The defense in Alger Hiss' New York perjury trial opened its case with a presentation of diplomat Philip Jessup as a character witness.
- The Central Intelligence Agency Act went into effect in the United States.
- The US Supreme Court decided United States v. Interstate Commerce Commission.
- Born: Lionel Richie, singer, songwriter and record producer, in Tuskegee, Alabama

== June 21, 1949 (Tuesday) ==
- The Fairground Park riot took place at a newly integrated public swimming pool in St. Louis, Missouri.
- Georgia Neese Clark became Treasurer of the United States, the first woman to hold that post.
- Born: John Agard, playwright, poet and children's writer, in Georgetown, British Guyana; Derek Emslie, Lord Kingarth, judge of the Supreme Courts of Scotland, in Edinburgh; Stuart Pearson, footballer, in Cottingham, East Riding of Yorkshire, England; Jane Urquhart, novelist and poet, in Little Long Lac, Ontario, Canada

== June 22, 1949 (Wednesday) ==
- Ezzard Charles won the vacant National Boxing Association Heavyweight Championship when he won a 15-round decision over Jersey Joe Walcott at Comiskey Park in Chicago.
- Born: Alan Osmond, member of The Osmonds family musical group, in Ogden, Utah (d. 2026); Meryl Streep, actress, in Summit, New Jersey; Lindsay Wagner, actress, in Los Angeles, California; Elizabeth Warren, politician, Senior Senator of Massachusetts, in Oklahoma City, Oklahoma

== June 23, 1949 (Thursday) ==
- Hungarian Vice Premier Mátyás Rákosi announced a purge of the Communist Party which he attributed to the discovery of a spy ring. 200,000 party members or about 18% of the membership were expelled.
- Iran and Iraq signed a treaty of friendship and mutual aid.
- Born: Gail Harris, United States Navy captain, in East Orange, New Jersey; Charles Ho, businessman, in Hong Kong

== June 24, 1949 (Friday) ==
- Dutch troops began their UN-supervised withdrawal from the Indonesian Republic's capital of Yogyakarta.
- The United Nations Security Council failed to agree on the admission of twelve new UN members when Britain and the US refused to approve applications from Mongolia and four Eastern Bloc states.
- Hopalong Cassidy starring William Boyd went on the air as the first Western television series. The show initially consisted of edited versions of the popular films which had been first released in 1935.
- Born: Agenor Muniz, footballer, in Sapucaia, Rio de Janeiro, Brazil; Janet Museveni, First Lady of Uganda, in Bwongyera, Western Uganda
- Died: Themistoklis Sofoulis, 88 or 89, Prime Minister of Greece

== June 25, 1949 (Saturday) ==
- A presidential election and constitutional referendum were held simultaneously in Syria. Husni al-Za'im ran unopposed and claimed 99.4% approval.
- Born: Dan Barker, atheist activist, in Santa Monica, California; Kene Holliday, actor, in Copiague, New York; Phyllis George, businesswoman, actress and sportscaster, in Denton, Texas (d. 2020); Yoon Joo-sang, actor, in Yangpyeong County, Gyeonggi Province, South Korea; Brenda Sykes, actress, in Shreveport, Louisiana; Patrick Tambay, racing driver, in Paris, France (d. 2022)
- Died: Buck Freeman, 77, American baseball player

== June 26, 1949 (Sunday) ==
- General elections were held in Belgium, the first since the introduction of universal women's suffrage. The Christian Social Party remained the largest party in both chambers of Parliament.
- Born: Avtar Singh Kang, singer, in Kultham, India
- Died: Kim Koo, 72, Korean nationalist politician (assassinated)

== June 27, 1949 (Monday) ==
- The 1949 Australian coal strike began.
- The Liberal Party of Canada led by Prime Minister Louis St. Laurent was easily returned to power in the Canadian federal election.
- Czechoslovakia banned pastoral letters and meetings of Catholic church officials that were not approved by the government.
- The science fiction TV series Captain Video and His Video Rangers premiered on the DuMont Television Network. The show would run until 1955 and air an estimated total of over 1,500 episodes.
- Born:
  - Vera Wang, fashion designer, in New York City
  - Stephen Rucker, television and film composer, in Brooklyn, New York

== June 28, 1949 (Tuesday) ==
- Alabama Governor Jim Folsom signed a bill into law that prohibited the wearing of masks in public places with only a few exceptions such as Halloween. The bill was in response to a recent wave of Ku Klux Klan-related disturbances in the Birmingham area.
- Alexandros Diomidis became Prime Minister of Greece following the death of Themistoklis Sofoulis.
- Born: Don Baylor, baseball player and manager, in Austin, Texas (d. 2017); Clarence Davis, NFL running back, in Birmingham, Alabama; Tom Owens, basketball player, in the Bronx, New York

== June 29, 1949 (Wednesday) ==
- The US House of Representatives approved President Truman's housing and slum clearance bill by a vote of 228 to 185.
- An interlocking one-year trade agreement was signed in Moscow between Russia, Czechoslovakia, Finland and Poland. The deal covered $56.4 million US worth of trade in food, timber, coal and sugar.
- The radio program Candy Matson, about a female private investigator, premiered on NBC West Coast.
- Born: Dan Dierdorf, NFL offensive linesman and sportscaster, in Canton, Ohio
- Died: David Philipson, 86, American Reform rabbi, orator and writer

== June 30, 1949 (Thursday) ==
- The Indian kingdom of Travancore was absorbed into India.
- Born: Philippe Toussaint, golfer, in Brussels, Belgium; Andy Scott, lead guitarist of the rock band Sweet, in Wrexham, Wales
- Died: Édouard Alphonse James de Rothschild, 81, French aristocrat and member of the Rothschild banking family
