= March 1949 =

Month of 1949

<<	March 1949					>>
Su	Mo	Tu	We	Th	Fr	Sa
		1	2	3	4	5
6	7	8	9	10	11	12
13	14	15	16	17	18	19
20	21	22	23	24	25	26
27	28	29	30	31

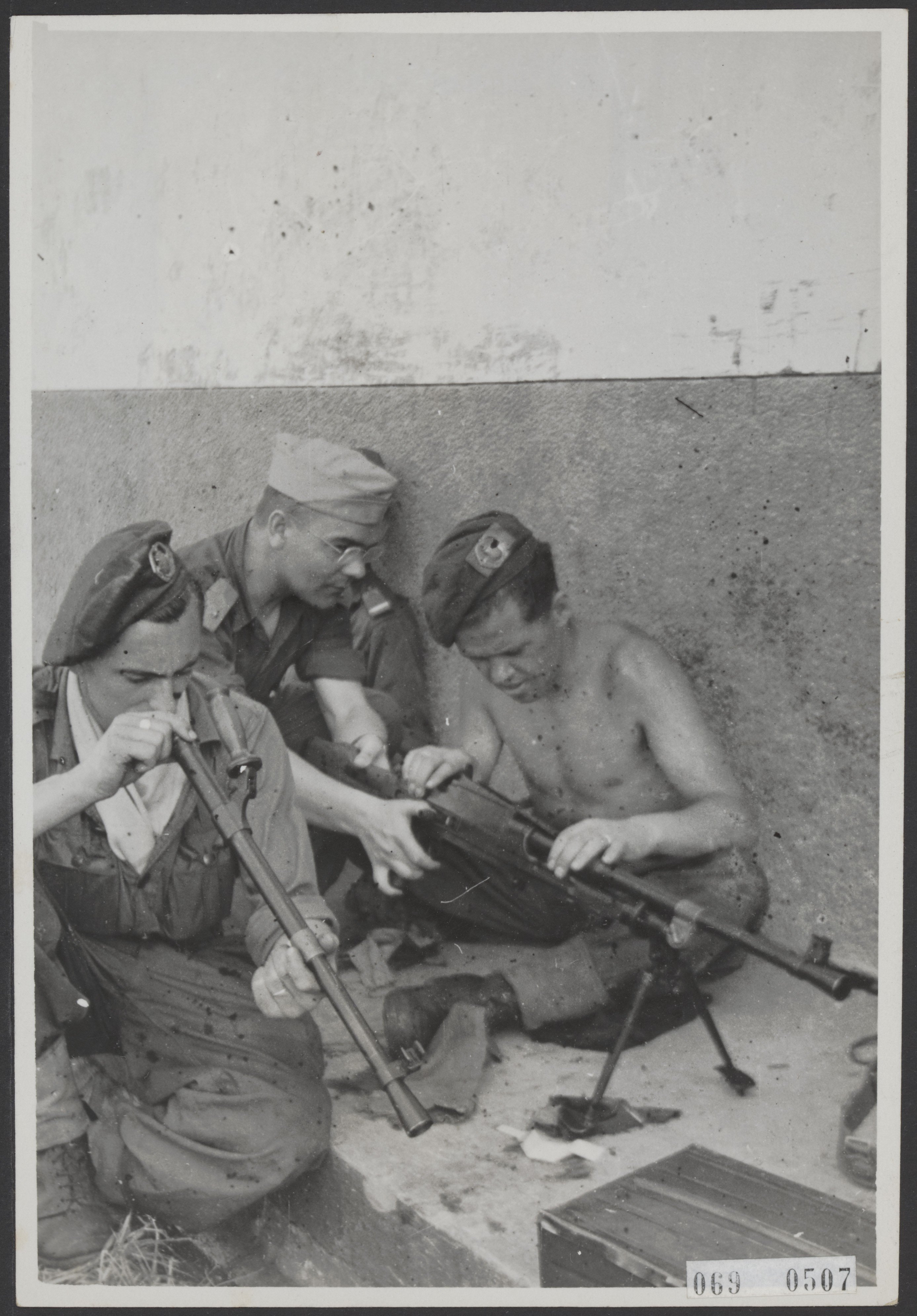

The following events occurred in March 1949:

== March 1, 1949 (Tuesday) ==
- World heavyweight boxing champion Joe Louis announced his retirement to become director of the newly formed International Boxing Club promotion.
- Indonesian Republic forces launched the General Offensive of 1 March 1949 against the Dutch in Yogyakarta. Indonesian troops held the city for six hours before retreating, but won a moral and diplomatic victory.
- A law went into effect in Bulgaria putting organized religion under control of the state.
- The British/American drama film Edward, My Son starring Spencer Tracy and Deborah Kerr premiered in the United Kingdom.
- Ripley's Believe It or Not!, the first of several television series based on the newspaper feature of the same name, premiered on NBC.

== March 2, 1949 (Wednesday) ==
- The B-50 SuperFortress Lucky Lady II landed at Fort Worth, Texas 94 hours and 1 minute after takeoff to complete the first nonstop round-the-world flight in history. Strategic Air Command chief Curtis LeMay, welcoming the plane at its landing, stated that the flight proved that a B-50 based in the United States could drop an atomic bomb "any place in the world."
- Born: Gates McFadden, actress and choreographer, in Cuyahoga Falls, Ohio; J. P. R. Williams, rugby player, in Bridgend, Wales (d. 2024)
- Died: Sarojini Naidu, 70, Indian freedom fighter and poet

== March 3, 1949 (Thursday) ==
- Norway rejected the Soviet Union's offer of a non-aggression pact and accepted an invitation to join the North Atlantic treaty negotiations.
- US President Harry S. Truman accepted the resignation of James Forrestal as Secretary of Defense and appointed Louis A. Johnson to replace him.
- Production of the Tucker 48 automobile ended when the Tucker Corporation headed by Preston Tucker ceased operations amidst a heavily publicized stock fraud scandal.
- Born: Gloria Hendry, actress and model, in Winter Haven, Florida

== March 4, 1949 (Friday) ==
- Israel's application of membership to the United Nations was approved by the Security Council by a vote of 9–1, with Egypt casting the only dissenting vote and Britain abstaining.
- Andrey Vyshinsky succeeded Vyacheslav Molotov as Soviet Foreign Minister.
- Died: James Rowland Angell, 79, American psychologist and educator

== March 5, 1949 (Saturday) ==
- North Korean leader Kim Il Sung met with Joseph Stalin at the Kremlin and secured an agreement for the USSR to provide North Korea with extensive financial credit. Kim informally broached the subject of reuniting Korea by force, but was rebuffed.
- The Israel Defense Forces launched Operation Uvda with the goal of capturing the southern Negev desert.
- A Budapest court handed down prison sentences for thirteen people accused of complicity in the alleged black market dealings of Cardinal József Mindszenty.
- US Department of Justice employee Judith Coplon was arrested on suspicion of espionage.
- Austria recognized Israel
- Born: Franz Josef Jung, politician, in Erbach, Germany

== March 6, 1949 (Sunday) ==
- The British government announced the production of plutonium at the Atomic Energy Research Establishment at Harwell.
- Parliamentary elections were held in Chile. The Liberal Party won a plurality of seats in the Senate while the Radical Party remained the largest party in the Chamber of Deputies.
- Born: Shaukat Aziz, economist and 15th Prime Minister of Pakistan, in Karachi, Pakistan; Martin Buchan, footballer, in Aberdeen, Scotland

== March 7, 1949 (Monday) ==
- Ted Williams signed a contract with the Boston Red Sox believed to be worth almost $100,000 a year, which would make him the highest-paid player in baseball.
- Born: Ghulam Nabi Azad, politician, in Soti, Jammu and Kashmir, India
- Died: Sol Bloom, 78, American entertainment impresario and politician; Bradbury Robinson, 65, American football player best known for throwing the first legal forward pass in history

== March 8, 1949 (Tuesday) ==
- Israeli Prime Minister David Ben-Gurion presented the Knesset with a four-year development plan for the country. The program called for a doubling of immigration, development of Jerusalem, encouragement of private investment and the eradication of illiteracy.
- Sun Fo resigned as Premier of the Republic of China.
- Born: Natalia Kuchinskaya, Olympic gymnast, in Leningrad, USSR
- The Élysée Accords were signed, granting Vietnam partial autonomy within the French Union to support a non-communist government.

== March 9, 1949 (Wednesday) ==
- Provincial council elections in South Africa resulted in a victory for the white supremacist National Party.
- Referendums on gambling and hours for liquor sales in hotel bars were held in New Zealand. The public voted in favor of allowing off-course betting on horse races but against extending liquor sales in hotel bars from 6pm to 10pm.
- Born: Kalevi Aho, composer, in Forssa, Finland; Rex Hunt, television and radio personality and Australian rules football player, in Melbourne, Australia; Tapani Kansa, singer, in Hamina, Finland
- Died: Prince Philip of Bourbon-Two Sicilies, 63; Walter Short, 68, Lieutenant General in the United States Army

== March 10, 1949 (Thursday) ==
- The Israeli Defence Forces reached the shores of the Red Sea at Umm Rashrash and raised an improvised flag that would come to be known as the Ink Flag, marking the end of the Arab–Israeli War.
- Soviet Finance Minister Arseny Zverev presented a budget estimating revenues at 445.208 billion rubles and expenditures at 415.35 billion rubles. The budget allotted 79 billion rubles to the military, a 20% increase over the previous year.
- A federal jury in Washington, D.C. found Mildred Gillars guilty of treason for broadcasting Nazi propaganda during World War II.
- The romantic drama film Little Women starring June Allyson, Peter Lawford, Margaret O'Brien, Elizabeth Taylor and Janet Leigh premiered at the Radio City Music Hall in New York.
- Born: Barbara Corcoran, businesswoman, writer and television personality, in Edgewater, New Jersey

== March 11, 1949 (Friday) ==
- Israel and Transjordan signed a ceasefire agreement similar to the one already signed between Israel and Egypt.
- Born: Georg Schramm, psychologist and Kabarett artist, in Bad Homburg vor der Höhe, Germany
- Died: Anastasios Charalambis, 86, Greek Lieutenant General and interim Prime Minister of Greece in 1922; Henri Giraud, 70, French general; Joan Lamote de Grignon, 76, Spanish pianist and composer

== March 12, 1949 (Saturday) ==
- US Defense Secretary James Forrestal broke a three-year taboo against official public discussion of biological warfare when he described much of what had been written about germ weapons as "extravagant, inaccurate and unduly spectacular" in a statement released to correct misconceptions about them.
- "Cruising Down the River" by Blue Barron and His Orchestra topped the Billboard singles chart.
- Born: Rob Cohen, film and television director, in Cornwall, New York

== March 13, 1949 (Sunday) ==
- South Korean Army forces launched a spring offensive against the Jeju uprising as South Korean President Syngman Rhee issued orders to eradicate the insurgents.

== March 14, 1949 (Monday) ==
- Clothes rationing ended in Britain after seven years and 287 days.
- 425,000 United Mine Workers east of the Mississippi River began a 2-week work stoppage on the order of John L. Lewis. Officially the stoppage was a memorial to the 1,015 miners killed and over 50,000 injured in 1948, but it was also a protest against the appointment of James Boyd as director of the federal Bureau of Mines, whom Lewis called an "incompetent, unqualified person."
- Born: Julia Migenes, soprano, in New York City
- Died: Joseph Seamon Cotter Sr., 88, African-American playwright

== March 15, 1949 (Tuesday) ==
- Britain announced the lifting of restrictions on German engineering industries' output, effective immediately.
- Born: Svetlana Dambinova, neuroscientist, in Irkutsk, Siberia, USSR
- Died: G. Edward Buxton Jr., 68, American army colonel and First Assistant Director of the OSS

== March 16, 1949 (Wednesday) ==
- Argentine President Juan Perón swore allegiance to the new Argentine Constitution which, having been drawn up in accordance with Perón's own specifications, allowed him to hold the Presidency for another six years after his present term expired in 1952.
- The cruiser USS Milwaukee, loaned to the Soviets in 1944, was returned to the US Navy in a state of disrepair.
- Born: Erik Estrada, actor, in New York City; Victor Garber, actor and singer, in London, Ontario, Canada; Elliott Murphy, singer-songwriter and author, in Rockville Centre, New York
- Died: Leyland Hodgson, 56, British-born American actor

== March 17, 1949 (Thursday) ==
- The Shamrock Hotel opened in Houston, Texas.
- Born: Patrick Duffy, actor, in Townsend, Montana; Pat Rice, footballer and coach, in Belfast, Northern Ireland
- Died: Felix Bressart, 57, German-born American actor; Aleksandra Ekster, 67, Russian painter and designer

== March 18, 1949 (Friday) ==
- A draft of the proposed North Atlantic treaty was released to the public.
- Born: Alex Higgins, snooker player, in Belfast, Northern Ireland (d. 2010)

== March 19, 1949 (Saturday) ==
- In a move to impede the establishment of a West German state, the East German People's Council in Berlin adopted a constitution providing for the creation of a central government in a unified Germany after the Allied occupation.
- Born: Valery Leontiev, pop singer, in Ust-Usa, Komi ASSR, Soviet Union
- Died: James Somerville, 66, Royal Navy officer

== March 20, 1949 (Sunday) ==
- The British, French and American authorities in Germany decreed the Deutsche Mark the sole legal currency of West Berlin. While no one was prevented from trading or holding the East German mark, the decree made the currency virtually worthless in West Berlin.
- A parade by members of Oswald Mosley's Union Movement in East London was disrupted by violent clashes with Communists. 10 policemen were injured and 35 Communists were arrested.
- The California Zephyr passenger train entered service between Chicago and Oakland, California.
- Born: Marcia Ball, blues singer and pianist, in Orange, Texas; Carl Palmer, rock drummer (Emerson, Lake & Palmer), in Handsworth, West Midlands, England

== March 21, 1949 (Monday) ==
- As a result of the previous day's rioting in East London, the Home Office prohibited all political marches in the city for three months.
- The 1949 BAA draft was held in New York City, the last draft before the league was renamed the National Basketball Association. The Providence Steamrollers selected Howie Shannon of Kansas State University as the first overall pick.
- WTVJ went on the air in Miami, the first television station in the state of Florida.
- Born: Eddie Money, singer and songwriter, as Edward Mahoney in New York City (d. 2019); Slavoj Žižek, philosopher, in Ljubljana, Yugoslavia
- Died: Frank Fetter, 86, American economist

== March 22, 1949 (Tuesday) ==
- Canadian Finance Minister Douglas Abbott presented a budget for the next fiscal year estimating revenue at $2.477 billion and expenditure at $2.39 billion. $368 million worth of taxes were cut from a wide variety of items ranging from personal and corporate taxes to soft drinks, cosmetics and matches.
- Born: Fanny Ardant, actress, in Saumur, France; John Toshack, footballer and manager, in Cardiff, Wales

== March 23, 1949 (Wednesday) ==
- Lebanon and Israel signed an armistice agreement providing for the exchange of prisoners of war and the setting of the demarcation line to correspond with the international Lebanese-Palestinian border.
- The British North American Act 1949, known since 1982 as the Newfoundland Act, was enacted in the United Kingdom to confirm and give effect to the Terms of union agreed to between Canada and Newfoundland.

== March 24, 1949 (Thursday) ==
- Aleksandr Vasilevsky replaced Nikolai Bulganin as Minister of the Armed Forces of the Soviet Union.
- The 21st Academy Awards were held at the Academy Theater in Hollywood. Hamlet won four Oscars including Best Picture, the first time a non-Hollywood production took the top prize.
- Born: Nick Lowe, singer, songwriter and producer, in Walton-on-Thames, England

== March 25, 1949 (Friday) ==
- The Chinese Communists transferred their headquarters from Shijiazhuang to Beijing.
- Danish Parliament approved joining the North Atlantic alliance by a vote of 64 to 8.
- Soviet authorities began Operation Priboi, a four-day mass deportation of over 90,000 people from the Baltic states to forced settlements in inhospitable areas of the Soviet Union.
- Paris Match, a French language weekly magazine, a first issue published in France.
- Born: Bob Ezrin, music producer, in Toronto, Canada
- Died: Prince August Wilhelm of Prussia, 62, fourth son of German Emperor Wilhelm II; Jack Kapp, 47, American record company executive

== March 26, 1949 (Saturday) ==
- The Communist Central Committee of China announced that it had voted to enter peace talks with the Nationalist government in Beijing on April 1.
- France and Italy signed a trade accord in Paris agreeing to end tariff duties in one year and establish an economic union in six years.
- The first half of Giuseppe Verdi's opera Aida conducted by Arturo Toscanini was telecast by NBC, live from Studio 8H at Rockefeller Center. The second half was telecast on April 2.
- Russian Hero won the 1949 Grand National horse race.
- University of Kentucky won its 2nd consecutive NCAA Basketball Championship when U.K. defeated Oklahoma A&M 46–36 in the NCAA Men's Division I Basketball Tournament Final at Hec Edmundson Pavilion in Seattle.
- "Cruising Down the River" by Russ Morgan and His Orchestra displaced the Blue Barron version of the same song atop the Billboard singles chart.
- Born: Jon English, musician and actor, in Hampstead, London, England (d. 2016); Vicki Lawrence, actress, comedian and singer, in Inglewood, California; Patrick Süskind, writer, in Ambach, Germany

== March 27, 1949 (Sunday) ==
- By a vote of 188–112, the Italian Senate approved of entering negotiations to join the North Atlantic alliance.
- Died: Elisheva Bikhovski, 60, Russian-Israeli poet, writer and translator

== March 28, 1949 (Monday) ==
- Louis A. Johnson became the second United States Secretary of Defense.
- English astronomer Fred Hoyle coined the term "Big Bang" during a talk on the BBC Third Programme to describe a theory he was opposed to in favor of the Steady State theory. The term did not widely catch on, however, until the 1970s.
- Born: Michael W. Young, geneticist, chronobiologist and Nobel laureate, in Miami, Florida; Ronnie Ray Smith, track and field athlete, in Los Angeles, California (d. 2013)
- Died: Alecu Constantinescu, 76, Romanian trade unionist, journalist and communist activist; Grigoraș Dinicu, 59, Romanian composer

== March 29, 1949 (Tuesday) ==
- Commander-in-Chief of Group of Soviet Forces in Germany Marshal Vasily Sokolovsky was promoted to First Deputy Minister of the Armed Forces of the Soviet Union. He was replaced in his former post by Vasily Chuikov.
- Their Finest Hour, the second volume in Winston Churchill's historical book series The Second World War, was published in the United States.
- Born: Michael Brecker, saxophonist and composer, in Cheltenham, Pennsylvania (d. 2007)
- Died: Inabata Katsutaro, 86, Japanese industrialist and film pioneer

== March 30, 1949 (Wednesday) ==
- March 1949 Syrian coup d'état: The Syrian government was overthrown in a bloodless coup led by Army chief of staff Husni al-Za'im.
- The Parliament of Iceland voted 37-13 to end the country's traditional policy of isolationism and join the North Atlantic alliance.
- Born: Lene Lovich, singer and songwriter, in Detroit, Michigan
- Died: Friedrich Bergius, 64, German chemist and Nobel Prize laureate; Prince Harald of Denmark, 72

== March 31, 1949 (Thursday) ==
- Newfoundland became the 10th province of Canada.
- Winston Churchill told an audience of 14,000 people in Boston Garden that the Soviets would have overrun all of Europe and attacked Britain "but for the deterrent of the atomic bomb in the hands of the United States."
- The first batch of 7-inch single vinyl records, often referred to as "45s" for the number of revolutions on the turntable per minute, was released in the United States by RCA Victor. The new format caught on with the public over the next few years since the discs were lighter in weight than the old 78s and yet still durable, making them an ideal format for jukeboxes.
