= February 1949 =

Month of 1949

<<	February 1949					>>
Su	Mo	Tu	We	Th	Fr	Sa
		1	2	3	4	5
6	7	8	9	10	11	12
13	14	15	16	17	18	19
20	21	22	23	24	25	26
27	28

The following events occurred in February 1949:

== February 1, 1949 (Tuesday) ==
- The Israeli Cabinet terminated the military governorship of Jerusalem and formally incorporated the city into the State of Israel.
- Born: Joan Burton, politician, in Stoneybatter, Ireland
- Died: Herbert Stothart, 63, American songwriter and composer

== February 2, 1949 (Wednesday) ==
- South Korea formally applied for membership in the United Nations.
- Golfer Ben Hogan suffered a fractured pelvis and broken collarbone in a head-on collision between his Cadillac and a bus east of Van Horn, Texas. Ben's wife Valerie suffered minor injuries.
- Born: Duncan Bannatyne, entrepreneur, in Clydebank, Scotland; Brent Spiner, actor, comedian and singer, in Houston, Texas
- Died: Pedro Paulo Bruno, 60, Brazilian painter, singer, poet and landscaper

== February 3, 1949 (Thursday) ==
- US President Harry S. Truman stated at his weekly press conference that he would only meet with Joseph Stalin if the Soviet leader came to Washington as his personal guest. The president reiterated the determination of the United States to not enter negotiations with the Soviet Union outside of the framework of the United Nations.
- Hungarian Cardinal József Mindszenty and six co-defendants went on trial in Budapest for treason and other crimes against the state.
- Born: Hennie Kuiper, racing cyclist, in Denekamp, Netherlands
- Died: William Rust, 45, British newspaper editor and communist activist

== February 4, 1949 (Friday) ==
- Shah of Iran Mohammad Reza Pahlavi was shot in the back and mouth during an unsuccessful assassination attempt. As the Shah was getting out of his car on the steps of Tehran University, a journalist pretended to take his picture but instead fired five shots at point blank range. The Shah's aides and the police pounced on the assailant and beat him to the point that he would die of his injuries in hospital.
- The comedy film John Loves Mary starring Ronald Reagan, Patricia Neal and Jack Carson premiered at the Strand Theatre in New York City.
- Born: Rasim Delić, Chief of Staff of the Army of the Republic of Bosnia and Herzegovina and war criminal, in Čelić, Yugoslavia (d. 2010)

== February 5, 1949 (Saturday) ==
- The three-day trial of Cardinal Mindszenty ended. The Primate of Hungary admitted guilt "in principle" to most of the charges against him but denied plotting to overthrow the Hungarian government.
- The Soviet Union offered Norway a non-aggression pact and warned that country not to join the proposed North Atlantic alliance.
- The Communist Tudeh Party of Iran was banned amid the government crackdown following an attempt on the Shah's life.
- Born: Kate Braverman, American novelist, in Philadelphia (d. 2019)

== February 6, 1949 (Sunday) ==
- Premier of the Republic of China Sun Fo said that his government's "principal task is to realize an honorable peace" and maintained that the Civil War would continue until the Communists dropped their demand for punishment of war criminals.
- The Oldsmobile company introduced the Oldsmobile 88, blending affordability with a powerful V8 engine that has led it to be widely cited as the auto industry's first muscle car.
- Born: Jim Sheridan, playwright and filmmaker, in Dublin, Ireland; Manuel Orantes, former Spanish tennis player and titles for 1975 US Open and 1976 Commercial Union Assurance Masters, (predecessor as ATP Finals) in Granada, Andalusia, Spain.
- Died: Hiroaki Abe, 59, Japanese admiral

== February 7, 1949 (Monday) ==
- Joe DiMaggio signed a new contract with the New York Yankees paying him a reported $90,000 for the upcoming season, making him the highest-salaried player in baseball.
- Born: Joe English, musician best known as the drummer of Wings, in Rochester, New York; Alan Lancaster, bassist of the rock band Status Quo, in London, England (d. 2021)

== February 8, 1949 (Tuesday) ==
- Cardinal Mindszenty was sentenced to life imprisonment. Mindszenty's six co-defendants were also given prison sentences ranging from three years to life.
- German dynamite teams under Soviet orders began demolishing the heavily damaged remains of the Reich Chancellory in Berlin.
- Born: Brooke Adams, actress, in New York City; Florinda Meza, actress, in Juchipila, Zacatecas, Mexico

== February 9, 1949 (Wednesday) ==
- North Korea applied for membership in the United Nations.
- Actor Robert Mitchum received a 60-day prison sentence in Los Angeles for participating in a marijuana smoking party.
- Born: Judith Light, actress, in Trenton, New Jersey

== February 10, 1949 (Thursday) ==
- The UN Security Council rejected a Soviet proposal that each member of the Big Five list its armed forces and armaments, including atomic bombs.
- The Georgia State Senate passed a voter registration bill requiring new applicants to meet educational and intelligence standards. Opponents charged that the bill's sole purpose was to disenfranchise black voters.
- The Arthur Miller play Death of a Salesman premiered at the Morosco Theatre on Broadway.
- Born: Maxime Le Forestier, singer, as Bruno Le Forestier in Paris, France; Nigel Olsson, rock drummer, in Wallasey, England
- Died: Francesco Ticciati, 55, Italian composer and concert pianist

== February 11, 1949 (Friday) ==
- The metropolitan police in Seoul announced the arrest of three Communists implicated in a plot to assassinate the members of the United Nations Commission on Korea as well as top Korean government officials.
- Canadian Prime Minister Louis St. Laurent arrived in Washington for a three-day visit to confer with President Truman on various issues affecting the United States and Canada.
- The London Mozart Players performed their first concert at Wigmore Hall.
- Died: Giovanni Zenatello, 72, Italian opera singer

== February 12, 1949 (Saturday) ==
- The Sacred Constitorial Congregation excommunicated and declared "infamous" all persons who took part in the Cardinal Mindszenty trial.
- 30 people were killed and 40 injured in a train derailment 40 miles west of Tarragona, Spain. Railway officials blamed the accident on sabotage of the tracks.
- Died: Hassan al-Banna, 42, Egyptian imam and founder of the Muslim Brotherhood (assassinated by the Egyptian secret police)

== February 13, 1949 (Sunday) ==
- A presidential election was held in Portugal, won by Óscar Carmona.
- 70 people were killed by a landslide in Peru.
- A Spanish-language version of the Orson Welles radio drama The War of the Worlds set off rioting in Quito, Ecuador, that killed 15 people.
- Died: George Aubourne Clarke FRPS FRMetS, 69, Scottish meteorologist

== February 14, 1949 (Monday) ==
- Israel's first Constituent Assembly was sworn in by acting president Chaim Weizmann in Jerusalem. The United States, Britain and France boycotted the ceremony, protesting Israel's refusal to recognize the UN declaration of Jerusalem as an international city.
- The Asbestos strike began in and around Asbestos, Quebec.
- Died: Fernand Desprès, 69, French anarchist and Communist activist

== February 15, 1949 (Tuesday) ==
- The Soviet Union denounced allegations that up to 14 million people were working as slave laborers in Russia and dying in large numbers because of inhumane treatment. Soviet UN delegate Semyon K. Tsarapkin said that any proposal to send a special commission to investigate the alleged slave labor camps was merely a ruse to let American spies into the USSR.
- Argentina diplomatically recognized Israel.
- Born: Ken Anderson, NFL quarterback, in Batavia, Illinois
- Died: Charles L. Bartholomew, 80, American editorial cartoonist; Patricia Ryan, 27, American actress (cerebral hemorrhage)

== February 16, 1949 (Wednesday) ==
- The United Nations Security Council voted 8-2 to reject consideration of North Korea's application for membership in the UN.
- World Health Organization Director-General Brock Chisholm announced that the Soviet Union, Ukraine and Byelorussia had withdrawn from the organization.
- The Lithuanian Partisans Declaration of February 16, 1949 was created.
- Born: Lyn Paul, pop singer and actress, in Wythenshawe, England

== February 17, 1949 (Thursday) ==
- Thailand declared a state of emergency and closed its Malayan border to hinder the movement of Malayan guerrillas.
- The Israeli constituent assembly adopted an interim constitution setting limits on presidential authority and making the prime minister and his cabinet answerable to parliament. The Assembly also confirmed Chaim Weizmann as President.
- The defense presented its opening argument in the Mildred Gillars trial with the statement that treason cannot be committed by "mere words."
- The film noir Caught, starring James Mason, Barbara Bel Geddes and Robert Ryan, premiered in New York.
- Born: Dennis Green, NFL coach, in Harrisburg, Pennsylvania (d. 2016)
- Died: George Denholm Armour OBE, 85, British painter and illustrator

== February 18, 1949 (Friday) ==
- An RAF transport plane flew the one millionth ton of supplies into Berlin since the airlift began.
- The World Figure Skating Championships concluded in Paris. Dick Button of the United States won the Men's event while Alena Vrzáňová of Czechoslovakia won the Ladies'.
- The United States Atomic Energy Commission assumed control of the Naval Proving Ground in Idaho's Lost River Desert, expanding it by 200,000 acres (81,000 ha) and renaming it the National Reactor Testing Station (NRTS).
- Born: Gary Ridgway, serial killer, in Salt Lake City, Utah
- Died:
  - Niceto Alcalá-Zamora, 71, Spanish lawyer and 6th President of Spain
  - Marty O'Toole, 60, Major League Baseball pitcher

== February 19, 1949 (Saturday) ==
- President Truman reactivated the United Service Organizations (USO).
- Ezra Pound was named the winner of the first annual Bollingen Prize for Poetry for his book The Pisan Cantos. Anticipating controversy for giving the award to a man under indictment for broadcasting Fascist propaganda during the war, the judges accompanied the announcement with the statement: "To permit other considerations than that of poetic achievement to sway the decision would destroy the significance of the award and would in principle deny the validity of that objective perception of value on which any civilized society must rest."
- Born: Danielle Bunten Berry, computer game designer and programmer, in St. Louis, Missouri (d. 1998)
- Died: Fidelio Ponce de León, 54, Cuban painter

== February 20, 1949 (Sunday) ==
- A ten-day strike of 11,000 transportation workers in Philadelphia ended with the acceptance of an 8-cent hourly wage increase.
- Born: Ivana Trump, businesswoman, socialite and first wife of Donald Trump, as Ivana Zelníčková in Zlín, Czechoslovakia (d. 2022)

== February 21, 1949 (Monday) ==
- Costa Rica and Nicaragua signed a friendship pact to end their dispute over Costa Rica's charge that Nicaraguan armed forces had invaded Costa Rican territory in December 1948.
- Rioting broke out in the British sector of Berlin between Jews and police outside a movie theatre screening the film Oliver Twist. Demonstrators protested that the portrayal of Fagin in the film was anti-Semitic.
- Former Finnish Prime Minister Johan Wilhelm Rangell was released from prison after serving three years of a six-year sentence for war responsibility.
- The courtroom film noir Knock on Any Door starring Humphrey Bogart was released.
- Born: Ronnie Hellström, footballer, in Malmö, Sweden (d. 2022)
- Died: Tan Malaka, 51, Indonesian nationalist activist and guerrilla fighter (executed by the Indonesian army)

== February 22, 1949 (Tuesday) ==
- French Communist Party leader Maurice Thorez suggested that French workers should aid the Red Army in the event of a war between the USSR and the West. French political leaders demanded that the government consider taking legal action against Thorez.
- Cincinnati Gardens opened in Cincinnati, Ohio.
- Grady the Cow gained national publicity when she got stuck inside a storage silo on a farm in Yukon, Oklahoma.
- Born: Niki Lauda, racing driver, in Vienna, Austria (d. 2019)

== February 23, 1949 (Wednesday) ==
- Mildred Gillars took the stand in her treason trial. During her testimony she admitted to having signed an oath of allegiance to Nazi Germany, but claimed she only did so "in order to live."
- Quebec Premier Maurice Duplessis declared the Asbestos strike illegal and dispatched a battalion of provincial police to the area.

== February 24, 1949 (Thursday) ==
- Israel and Egypt signed a general armistice agreement at the UN mediation headquarters on the island of Rhodes.
- The flag of Samoa was adopted.

== February 25, 1949 (Friday) ==
- Fifteen Bulgarian Protestant churchmen went on trial before a Sofia court on charges of espionage. Two defendants read confessions in the opening session.
- James Grover McDonald was named first United States Ambassador to Israel.
- The earliest documented instance of a panty raid took place at Augustana College in Rock Island, Illinois.
- Born:
  - Ric Flair, professional wrestler, as Richard Fliehr in Memphis, Tennessee; Jack Handey, humorist, in San Antonio, Texas
  - Amin Maalouf, French-Lebanese author, in Beirut
- Died: Juan Sinforiano Bogarín, 85, Roman Catholic archbishop of Paraguay

== February 26, 1949 (Saturday) ==
- Paraguay's second coup in a month ousted Raimundo Rolón as provisional president in favor of Felipe Molas López.
- The Dutch government announced that it would transfer sovereignty over Indonesia before the July 1, 1950 deadline set by the UN.
- Italian Communist leader Palmiro Togliatti echoed Maurice Thorez' recent remarks by declaring that Italian Communists would be duty-bound to assist the Red Army if it should invade Italy in pursuit of an aggressor.
- Grady the Cow was freed by rubbing her with grease, putting her on a greased platform and pushing her back out the same small opening she had bolted through.
- Born: Simon Crean, politician and trade unionist, in Melbourne, Australia (d. 2023)

== February 27, 1949 (Sunday) ==
- Palace Rebellion: Confused fighting between Thai soldiers and sailors broke out in the streets of Bangkok after rebels seized a government radio station and attempted to start a coup by falsely reporting that Prime Minister Plaek Phibunsongkhram had resigned. At least 50 people were killed in the fighting.
- The Malayan Chinese Association (now the Malaysian Chinese Association) was founded.

== February 28, 1949 (Monday) ==
- Joseph Stalin decreed sweeping cuts in the price of food, clothing and other consumers' goods.
- Truman Capote's short story collection A Tree of Night and Other Stories was published.
- Audie Murphy's World War II memoir To Hell and Back was published.
- The Australian Broadcasting Corporation radio serial Blue Hills premiered. The show would run until September 30, 1976 and air a total of 5,795 episodes, making it at one time the longest-running radio serial in the world.
- Born: Ilene Graff, actress and singer, in Queens, New York
