= July 1949 =

Month of 1949

<<	July 1949					>>
Su	Mo	Tu	We	Th	Fr	Sa
					1	2
3	4	5	6	7	8	9
10	11	12	13	14	15	16
17	18	19	20	21	22	23
24	25	26	27	28	29	30
31

The following events occurred in July 1949:

== July 1, 1949 (Friday) ==
- Judith Coplon was sentenced to 3 to 10 years in prison for acting as a spy for the Soviets.
- The Kemi strike began in Finland.
- The Institute of Chartered Accountants of India was established.
- In Quebec, the Asbestos strike ended after the workers accepted a 10-cent per hour wage increase.
- American Ted Schroeder defeated Czech Jaroslav Drobný in the Gentlemen's Singles Final at the Wimbledon Championships.
- Born: John Farnham, English-born Australian singer, in Dagenham
- Died: Isamu Takeshita, 79, Japanese admiral

== July 2, 1949 (Saturday) ==
- The State of Vietnam was proclaimed.
- 1949 MacRobertson Miller Aviation DC-3 crash: A Douglas DC-3 flying from Perth to Carnarvon, Western Australia lost control shortly after takeoff and crashed, killing all 18 aboard.
- Vasil Kolarov became 33rd prime minister of Bulgaria.
- Louise Brough defeated Margaret Osborne duPont in an all-American Ladies' Singles Final at the Wimbledon Championships.
- The romantic drama film The Fountainhead based on the Ayn Rand novel of the same name and starring Gary Cooper and Patricia Neal was released.
- Born: David Eaton, composer and conductor, in Cleveland, Ohio
- Died: Georgi Dimitrov, 67, Bulgarian communist politician

== July 3, 1949 (Sunday) ==
- The government of Yugoslavia claimed that "gross violations" of the Italian Peace Treaty by the US, Britain and Italy had compelled it to incorporate the Yugoslavian occupation area of the Free Territory of Trieste into the Yugoslavian economy.
- Born: Jan Smithers, actress, in North Hollywood, Los Angeles, California; Johnnie Wilder Jr., lead vocalist of the R&B/funk group Heatwave, in Dayton, Ohio (d. 2006)

== July 4, 1949 (Monday) ==
- Princess Elizabeth moved from Buckingham Palace to Clarence House, her first official residence.
- Born: Horst Seehofer, politician, in Ingolstadt, West Germany
- A Strasbourg-to-Paris express train derailed in Emberménil, killing at least six and injuring at least 29.

== July 5, 1949 (Tuesday) ==
- The treason trial of "Tokyo Rose" Iva Toguri D'Aquino began in San Francisco with jury selection.
- Shimoyama incident: Japanese National Railways president Sadanori Shimoyama disappeared on his way to work. His body was found the next day but the cause of death remains a mystery.

== July 6, 1949 (Wednesday) ==
- Poland joined in Eastern Europe's economic blockade of Yugoslavia.
- NAACP leader Walter Francis White married writer Poppy Cannon in New York. The interracial marriage was kept a secret from the public for over a month.
- Born: Noli de Castro, journalist and politician, in Pola, Oriental Mindoro, Philippines; Phyllis Hyman, singer and actress, in Philadelphia, Pennsylvania (d. 1995)
- Died: Hans Heinz Zerlett, 56, German screenwriter and film director (died of tuberculosis in a Soviet internment camp)

== July 7, 1949 (Thursday) ==
- British soldiers began unloading food on the London waterfront to combat a wildcat dock workers' strike.
- The "Free Albania" National Committee was formed.
- Born: Shelley Duvall, actress, in Houston, Texas

== July 8, 1949 (Friday) ==
- The Prohibition of Mixed Marriages Act went into effect in South Africa, one of the first pieces of apartheid legislation since the National Party came to power.
- The perjury trial of Alger Hiss ended in a hung jury.
- Born: Carmel Cryan, actress, in London, England; Wolfgang Puck, chef, in Sankt Veit an der Glan, Austria
- Died: Harold Knerr, 66, American comic strip cartoonist (The Katzenjammer Kids)

== July 9, 1949 (Saturday) ==
- Bobby Locke won the British Open.
- Born: Ali Akbar Abdolrashidi, intellectual and journalist, in Kerman, Iran; Jesse Duplantis, televangelist minister, in New Orleans, Louisiana; Nigel Lythgoe, dancer, choreographer and television personality, in Wallasey, England
- Died: Fritz Hart, 75, English composer

== July 10, 1949 (Sunday) ==
- The Khait earthquake in Tajikistan triggered a massive landslide that killed an estimated 7,200 people.

== July 11, 1949 (Monday) ==
- King George VI gave the British government emergency powers to deal with the strike of London dock workers.
- The four-masted barque Pamir became the last windjammer to carry a commercial load around Cape Horn.
- The first sitting of the Newfoundland and Labrador General Assembly after the province joined the Canadian federation.
- Anna Lucasta a 1949 America drama film, directed by Irving Rapper, starring Paulette Goddard, Oscar Homolka, and John Ireland was released.
- Headquartered in Little Rock, Arkansas, the Arkansas Electric Cooperative Corporation, an electrical generation and distribution cooperative, was founded.
- Died: Corneliu Dragalina, 52, Romanian World War II general; Beauford H. Jester, 56, 36th Governor of Texas (heart attack aboard a train)

== July 12, 1949 (Tuesday) ==
- A Lockheed L-749 Constellation of KLM Royal Dutch Airlines crashed in a monsoon rainstorm near Bombay, India. All 45 aboard (including Pulitzer Prize winning journalist H R. Knickerbocker) perished.
- The American League defeated the National League 11–7 in the 16th Major League Baseball All-Star Game at Ebbets Field in Brooklyn.
- Died: Douglas Hyde, 89, Irish scholar and 1st president of Ireland

== July 13, 1949 (Wednesday) ==
- The Vatican warned that all Catholics who "defend and spread the materialistic and anti-Christian doctrine of the Communists" would be excommunicated.
- The drama film The Great Gatsby starring Alan Ladd and based on the F. Scott Fitzgerald novel of the same name was released.

== July 14, 1949 (Thursday) ==
- Former national committeeman for the American Communist Party Manning Johnson testified before the House Un-American Activities Committee in Washington. Johnson estimated that there were about 2,000 Negro Communists in the United States and claimed that singer Paul Robeson had been a secret member of the Communist Party "for many years."
- 5-year-old Robert Kasik of Berwyn, Illinois, fell into one of three hot springs near the foundations of the West Thumb Geyser Basin cafeteria building in Yellowstone National Park. He died from his burns six hours later.
- Died: Otto Wächter, 48, Austrian SS officer and Nazi politician

== July 15, 1949 (Friday) ==
- Prüm explosion: An ammunition depot in the Eifel mountains in western Germany blew up for reasons that were never determined, killing 12 people and leaving one of the largest man-made explosion craters in existence.
- Mitaka incident: An unmanned train drove into Mitaka Station in Tokyo, Japan, killing 6 people and injuring 20.
- Czech tennis stars Jaroslav Drobný and Vladimír Černík declared at a tournament in Gstaad, Switzerland that they were defecting and would seek asylum in the United States.
- Born: Carl Bildt, 30th prime minister of Sweden, in Halmstad, Sweden; Trevor Horn, musician and record producer, in Durham, England; Mohammed bin Rashid Al Maktoum, Ruler of Dubai, in Al Shindagha, Dubai
- Died: Anastasios Dalipis, 52 or 53, Greek Army officer and politician; Eva Marian Hubback, 53, English feminist

== July 16, 1949 (Saturday) ==
- The Communist Party of Czechoslovakia issued a manifesto maintaining that there would be no compromise in the fight against the church, which it characterized as "our greatest enemy."

== July 17, 1949 (Sunday) ==
- Hunan Province in China reported its worst flooding in 50 years, leaving 57,000 dead, 5 million homeless and 5 million acres of rice fields destroyed.
- Born:
  - Geezer Butler, bassist, songwriter and founding member of the heavy metal band Black Sabbath, as Terence Butler in Aston, Birmingham, England; Andrei Fursenko, politician, scientist and businessman, in Leningrad, USSR
  - Charley Steiner, sportscaster and broadcast journalist, in Malverne, New York
- Jacques Lacan gives a lecture on the Mirror stage at the 16th International Congress of Psychoanalysis.

== July 18, 1949 (Monday) ==
- Jackie Robinson testified before the House Un-American Activities Committee to dispute a declaration from Paul Robeson that Negroes would not fight against Russia. Robinson maintained, however, that "Negroes were stirred up long before there was a Communist party" and would remain that way until racial equality was achieved.
- Died: Francisco Javier Arana, 43, Guatemalan Army officer (killed in a shootout); Vítězslav Novák, 78, Czech composer

== July 19, 1949 (Tuesday) ==
- French President Vincent Auriol signed an agreement with Laotian King Sisavang Vong in Paris to recognize Laos as an independent state within the French Union.
- The USSR accused Italy of violating the 1947 peace treaty by signing the North Atlantic pact. The Russian note said that Italy broke a clause in the treaty that forbade the joining of "any alliances or other groupings pursuing aggressive aims."
- Born: Kgalema Motlanthe, 3rd president of South Africa, in Boksburg, South Africa; Daniel Vaillant, politician, in Lormes, France
- Died: Frank Murphy, 59, United States Supreme Court justice

== July 20, 1949 (Wednesday) ==
- Israel and Syria signed an armistice agreement in which both sides agreed to keep their military forces behind their international borders and to establish demilitarized zones in contested areas.

== July 21, 1949 (Thursday) ==
- The US Senate ratified the North Atlantic Treaty by a vote of 82 to 13.
- Died: Karl-Hermann Geib, 41, German physical chemist

== July 22, 1949 (Friday) ==
- A French military tribunal sentenced former German Ambassador to Vichy France Otto Abetz to 20 years hard labour as a war criminal.
- Dock workers in London voted to end their four-week strike.
- Born: Alan Menken, film score composer and pianist, in New York City; Lasse Virén, long-distance runner, in Myrskylä, Finland

== July 23, 1949 (Saturday) ==
- Yugoslavian Foreign Minister Edvard Kardelj announced his country's withdrawal of "moral and political" support for Greek Communist guerrillas, whom he accused of following the Cominform's anti-Tito line.
- Died: Masaharu Anesaki, 75, Japanese scholar

== July 24, 1949 (Sunday) ==
- Shanghai was struck by a typhoon that would kill at least 29 people and leave portions of the city six feet underwater.
- The Raszyn radio transmitter became operational in Poland.
- Former French Prime Minister Édouard Herriot was named chairman of the Council of Europe ahead of the body's first meeting to be held in Strasbourg on August 10.
- Born: Michael Richards, actor and comedian best known for playing Cosmo Kramer on the TV sitcom Seinfeld, in Culver City, California
- Died: Nils Östensson, 31, Swedish gold medalist cross-country skier (motorcycle accident)

== July 25, 1949 (Monday) ==
- President Truman signed the North Atlantic Treaty and asked Congress to appropriate $1.45 billion in arms aid to signers of the treaty as well as Turkey, Greece, Iran and the Philippines.

== July 26, 1949 (Tuesday) ==
- The Western Allied military commanders in Berlin ordered restitution of all private property seized by the Nazis in excess of 1,000 reichsmarks in value at the time of confiscation.
- Ecuador put down an armed revolt and arrested up to sixty persons, including former president Carlos Mancheno Cajas, in connection with the failed uprising.
- Born: Thaksin Shinawatra, businessman and 23rd prime minister of Thailand, in San Kamphaeng District, Thailand; Roger Taylor, drummer for the rock band Queen, in King's Lynn, Norfolk, England
- Died: Linda Arvidson, 65, American actress

== July 27, 1949 (Wednesday) ==
- The French National Assembly approved the North Atlantic Treaty by a vote of 398 to 187.
- The de Havilland Comet, the world's first production commercial jetliner, had its first flight.
- During the 1949 New Zealand rugby union tour of South Africa, Rhodesia defeated New Zealand 10–8 in an exhibition match in Bulawayo, marking the only time a non-Test nation has ever defeated the All-Blacks.
- The fantasy film Mighty Joe Young starring Terry Moore, Ben Johnson and Robert Armstrong was released.
- Died: Ellery Harding Clark, 75, American track and field athlete

== July 28, 1949 (Thursday) ==
- The House of Lords vetoed the government's steel nationalization bill by voting 103 to 29 to restore an amendment delaying the nationalization date until after the next general election.
- Daniel Chanis Pinzón became President of Panama.
- Born: Vida Blue, baseball player, in Mansfield, Louisiana (d. 2023)

== July 29, 1949 (Friday) ==
- The United States and Britain announced plans to phase out the Berlin airlift by October 1.
- Murder of Bill Mason: Alice, Texas radio journalist W.H. Mason was shot and killed in a car with a friend, resulting in the arrest of deputy sheriff Sam Smithwick for murder. The previous day, Mason had claimed in a broadcast that a local dance hall was being operated in a disreputable manner without interference from law enforcement.
- Born: Jamil Mahuad, lawyer and 39th president of Ecuador, in Loja, Ecuador
- Died: Alice Everett, 84, British astronomer and engineer

== July 30, 1949 (Saturday) ==
- An Eastern Air Lines Douglas DC-3 collided in mid-air with an F6F Hellcat fighter plane of the US Navy near the McGuire Air Force Base in New Jersey, resulting in the deaths of the Navy pilot and all fifteen people on the DC-3. The accident was attributed to reckless conduct on the part of the Navy pilot.
- The British sloop Amethyst, detained by Chinese Communist forces since the Amethyst Incident on April 20, escaped down the Yangtze River under fire. Prime Minister Clement Attlee radioed a message of congratulations to the crew for its "gallant exploit."
- Brigadier General Frank L. Howley resigned as commandant of the American sector of Berlin.
- The Legal Aid and Advice Act 1949 received Royal assent in the United Kingdom. It allowed those unable to pay for a solicitor to access free legal help, but it was only applicable to England and Wales.
- "Some Enchanted Evening" by Perry Como topped the Billboard singles chart.
- Died: Stoyan Danev, 91, Bulgarian politician and two-time prime minister; Vicenta Chávez Orozco, 82, Mexican nun

== July 31, 1949 (Sunday) ==
- A pastoral letter was read in Catholic churches throughout West Germany telling voters that failure of Catholics to vote in the August 14 election might play into the hands of "forces which oppose Christian principles." Social Democratic Party leader Kurt Schumacher took exception to the letter, charging that it was an attempt to swing votes to the Christian Democratic Union. "We have absolute understanding for all doctrines rooted in Christian ethics and morality," Schumacher said. "But we have no understanding for outspoken power politics exercised by ecclesiastical authorities."
- Born: Dimitri Devyatkin, filmmaker, video artist and journalist, in Manhattan, New York
