= May 1949 =

Month of 1949

| << | May 1949 | | | | | >> |
| Su | Mo | Tu | We | Th | Fr | Sa |
| 1 | 2 | 3 | 4 | 5 | 6 | 7 |
| 8 | 9 | 10 | 11 | 12 | 13 | 14 |
| 15 | 16 | 17 | 18 | 19 | 20 | 21 |
| 22 | 23 | 24 | 25 | 26 | 27 | 28 |
| 29 | 30 | 31 |

May 23: The Federal Republic of Germany (More Commonly Referred to as West Germany) is Established with Bonn as its Capital City.

The following events occurred in May 1949:

== May 1, 1949 (Sunday) ==
- 230 years of monarchial rule in the princely state of Baroda came to an end when it formally acceded to the Dominion of India.
- Dutch-American astronomer Gerard Kuiper discovered the second moon of the planet Neptune and named it Nereid, after the sea nymphs of Greek mythology.
- The William A. Stickel Memorial Bridge was inaugurated in New Jersey.
- Died: Josep Maria Jujol, 69, Catalan architect

== May 2, 1949 (Monday) ==
- By a 4-4 split, the US Supreme Court refused to intervene in the cases of more than fifty Germans convicted by American military tribunals at Nuremberg.
- The Pulitzer Prizes were awarded. The novel Guard of Honor by James Gould Cozzens won the Prize for Fiction, while the Arthur Miller play Death of a Salesman won the Pulitzer Prize for Drama. Robert E. Sherwood won his fourth Pulitzer when Roosevelt and Hopkins won in the Biography category.
- Born: Alan Titchmarsh, gardener and media personality, in Ilkley, England

== May 3, 1949 (Tuesday) ==
- Chinese Communist forces captured Hangzhou, sealing off Shanghai by land from the rest of China.
- Baseball Commissioner Happy Chandler reinstated New York Giants manager Leo Durocher after he found that there was not enough evidence to prove that Durocher had deliberately assaulted a fan at the Polo Grounds after a game on April 28.
- Born: Leopoldo Luque, footballer, in Santa Fe, Argentina (d. 2021)
- Died: Mariano Fortuny, 77, Spanish fashion designer

== May 4, 1949 (Wednesday) ==
- The Superga air disaster occurred when a Fiat G.212 carrying the entire Torino football club crashed into a wall in the back of the Basilica of Superga in the vicinity of Turin, Italy. The entire team was killed.
- The Big Four powers agreed to lift the Berlin Blockade and counter-blockade measures. A US State Department announcement gave no date for the lifting but said that "agreement has been reached and that all restrictions imposed in Germany which have been the subject of conversation will be mutually lifted."
- The Belgian Chamber of Deputies approved the North Atlantic Pact by a vote of 139 to 22.
- The Technicolor musical film The Barkleys of Broadway was released, reuniting Fred Astaire and Ginger Rogers on screen after ten years apart.
- Born: John Force, racing driver, in Bell Gardens, California
- Died: Valerio Bacigalupo, 25, Italian footballer (killed in the Superga air disaster)

== May 5, 1949 (Thursday) ==
- The Statute of the Council of Europe was signed in London, creating the Council of Europe.
- Over 62,000 workers at two Ford Motor Company plants walked out in protest of an alleged speed-up of the assembly lines, a charge the company denied.
- In Quebec, 4,000 striking workers in the three-month old Asbestos strike blockaded every road into the area to prevent the Canadian Johns Manville Company from bringing in strike-breakers.
- Charlie Gehringer was elected to the Baseball Hall of Fame.

== May 6, 1949 (Friday) ==
- A motorized convoy of 150 police was sent to break up the blockade in the Asbestos strike with instructions to "shoot as necessary." The police broke through the barricades and entered the town, beating strikers and making 150 arrests.
- At the UN General Assembly, the United States denied a Russian and Polish charge that Americans were building air and military bases in Francoist Spain. "Despite assertions to the contrary, we have no military alliance with Spain, we have given no military assistance to Spain, no military or naval missions are maintained in Spain. The United States has no air bases anywhere on Spanish territory," declared US delegate Ray Atherton. "We have made no overtures in bringing Spain into the United Nations or into the European recovery program or the North Atlantic treaty. Spanish participation in such cooperative projects is a matter of determination by all participants and not by the United States alone."
- The early British computer EDSAC at Cambridge University ran its first programs when it calculated a table of square numbers and a list of prime numbers.
- Died: Stanisław Grabski, 78, Polish economist and politician; Kunihiko Hashimoto, 44, Japanese composer (gastric cancer); Maurice Maeterlinck, 86, Belgian playwright, poet and essayist

== May 7, 1949 (Saturday) ==
- Voice of America and the BBC began combining their efforts to thwart Soviet attempts to jam broadcasts into the USSR. Voice engineers called the effort "successful."
- Ponder won the Kentucky Derby at 16-1 odds.
- Bradford Northern defeated Halifax 12-0 in rugby's Challenge Cup Final in front of 95,000 at Wembley Stadium.
- Born: Deborah Butterfield, sculptor, in San Diego, California
- Died: Arie Frederik Lasut, 30, Indonesian revolutionary and national hero (shot by Dutch forces)

== May 8, 1949 (Sunday) ==
- A draft of the West German constitution was approved 53-12 by the parliamentary council at Bonn.
- The Soviet War Memorial opened in Berlin's Treptower Park on the fourth anniversary of V-E Day.
- Died: Sam Breadon, 72, American executive and majority owner of the St. Louis Cardinals baseball team

== May 9, 1949 (Monday) ==
- Rainier III became Prince of Monaco upon the death of his grandfather, Louis II.
- The Iranian constitution was amended to give the Shah power to dissolve parliament.
- The Republic XF-91 Thunderceptor prototype interceptor aircraft had its first flight.
- Born: Billy Joel, singer-songwriter and pianist, in the Bronx, New York; Ibrahim Baré Maïnassara, 5th President of Niger, in Dogondoutchi, Niger (d. 1999)
- Died: Louis II, Prince of Monaco, 78

== May 10, 1949 (Tuesday) ==
- By a vote of 33-29, the West German Parliamentary Council selected Bonn over Frankfurt as the capital of the West German state.
- The Morehead Planetarium and Science Center was established on the campus of the University of North Carolina at Chapel Hill, one of the first planetariums in the United States.
- Judy Garland was suspended from salary by Metro-Goldwyn-Mayer for walking out on production of the film Annie Get Your Gun.
- Died: Emilio de Gogorza, 76, American baritone

== May 11, 1949 (Wednesday) ==
- Siam officially declared that its name would henceforward be Thailand and its people known as the Thai.
- Host country Brazil beat Paraguay 7-0 in the final match of the South American Championship of football.
- The United Nations General Assembly admitted Israel to membership in the UN by a vote of 37-12. The delegations of the six Arab countries (Egypt, Iraq, Lebanon, Saudi Arabia, Syria and Yemen) walked out of the Assembly Hall in protest.
- U.S. President Harry S. Truman signed a bill authorizing the missile test range, which is now the Eastern Range at Cape Canaveral, Florida.

== May 12, 1949 (Thursday) ==
- The Berlin Blockade ended after 327 days at 1:46 a.m. local time when the first automobiles were allowed to cross the Soviet zone into the city.
- The British House of Commons ratified the North Atlantic Treaty by a vote of 333 to 6.
- The war film Home of the Brave starring Douglas Dick, Jeff Corey, Lloyd Bridges, Frank Lovejoy and James Edwards was released.
- Born: Ross Bleckner, artist, in New York City

== May 13, 1949 (Friday) ==
- The English Electric Canberra jet-powered bomber had its first flight.
- Born: Zoë Wanamaker, actress, in New York City
- Nickel Plate Road 779, the last locomotive built by Lima Locomotive Works in Lima, Ohio

== May 14, 1949 (Saturday) ==
- German Communist fugitive from the United States Gerhart Eisler was arrested after a struggle aboard the Polish liner MS Batory off Southampton. Eisler had jumped his $23,500 bail and stowed away on the ship as it sailed from New York.
- The 70 Sculptors photograph was taken at the Philadelphia Museum of Art by Life magazine photographer Herbert Gehr.
- "(Ghost) Riders in the Sky: A Cowboy Legend" by Vaughn Monroe and His Orchestra hit #1 on the Billboard singles chart.

== May 15, 1949 (Sunday) ==
- Parliamentary elections were held in Hungary, the first of the non-competitive elections that would be the norm through the Communist era.
- 25,000 Catholics gathered at Brooklyn's Ebbets Field to hold a mass prayer for József Mindszenty and other clergymen imprisoned in Communist countries.
- Died: Henri Beau, 85, French-Canadian Impressionist painter

== May 16, 1949 (Monday) ==
- A United Nations resolution to lift a ban on diplomatic relations with Francoist Spain fell four votes short of the two-thirds majority required to pass.
- The Tokyo Stock Exchange resumed formal business for the first time since being closed in August 1945.
- Frank Zamboni applied for a United States patent for the world's first self-propelled ice resurfacing machine.
- People's Liberation Army troops entered Wuhan, Hubei, China
- Born: Rick Reuschel, baseball player, in Quincy, Illinois

== May 17, 1949 (Tuesday) ==
- India's Constituent Assembly approved Indian membership in the British Commonwealth.
- Born: Bill Bruford, drummer and founding member of the rock band Yes, in Sevenoaks, Kent, England

== May 18, 1949 (Wednesday) ==
- The British Labour Party expelled pro-Soviet members Konni Zilliacus and Leslie Solley for voting against ratification of the North Atlantic Treaty.
- Born: Rick Wakeman, keyboardist of the rock band Yes, in Perivale, England
- Died: James Truslow Adams, 70, American writer and historian

== May 19, 1949 (Thursday) ==
- The US Navy flying boat Caroline Mars broke its own record for most passengers in a plane when it carried 308 people from Alameda, California to San Diego.
- Martial law was announced in Taiwan, which would last until July 1987.
- Born: Dusty Hill, bassist of the rock band ZZ Top, as Joseph Hill in Dallas, Texas (d. 2021); Archie Manning, NFL quarterback, in Drew, Mississippi; Robert W. Broach, world-renowned chemist with multiple patents, in Atkins, Arkansas;
- Died: Paul Schultze-Naumburg, 79, German architect

== May 20, 1949 (Friday) ==
- The US and Britain rejected a Russian offer to mediate in the Greek Civil War, claiming that any settlement must come through the United Nations.
- The Armed Forces Security Agency (the predecessor of the National Security Agency) was established in the United States.
- Don Newcombe made his major league debut for the Brooklyn Dodgers, facing five batters and giving up three runs on four hits in a seventh inning relief appearance against the St. Louis Cardinals.
- Born: Dave Thomas, actor and comedian, in St. Catharines, Ontario, Canada
- Died: Damaskinos of Athens, 58, Archbishop of Athens and All Greece

== May 21, 1949 (Saturday) ==
- 1949 East German State Railway strike: 16,000 non-Communist railway workers in Berlin went on strike to demand payment in western Deutsche Marks. 500 were reported injured in fighting between strikers and Soviet sector police and strike-breakers.
- Born Andrew Neil, Scottish journalist and broadcaster
- Died: Klaus Mann, 42, German writer (sleeping pill overdose)

== May 22, 1949 (Sunday) ==
- In the Karen conflict, Burmese troops reportedly occupied the Karen stronghold of Insein.
- Tornadoes in the Midwestern United States caused 46 fatalities, 21 of which were recorded in Cape Girardeau, Missouri.
- Died: James Forrestal, 57, 48th United States Secretary of the Navy and 1st Secretary of Defense (fell from a hospital window, probable suicide although theories of homicide persist)

== May 23, 1949 (Monday) ==
- The Federal Republic of Germany, commonly known as West Germany was officially proclaimed in Bonn.
- The Council of Foreign Ministers began a conference in Paris to discuss Germany and Austria.
- The Hollywood Ten filed a $52 million lawsuit under the Sherman Antitrust Act against ten companies of the Motion Picture Association of America.
- Born: Alan García, 38th and 42nd President of Peru, in Lima, Peru (d. 2019)
- Died: Jan Frans De Boever, 76, Flemish painter

== May 24, 1949 (Tuesday) ==
- Speaking at the Paris Foreign Ministers Conference, Soviet representative Andrey Vyshinsky urged a return to the system of four-power Allied rule in Germany, including revival of the Allied Control Council and the Allied Kommandatura. US State Secretary Dean Acheson rejected the proposal.
- American labor organizer Victor G. Reuther survived an attempt on his life when an assailant fired a shotgun through the kitchen window of his Detroit home. Reuther lost his right eye from the blasts.
- Born: Jim Broadbent, actor, in Holton cum Beckering, England; Tomaž Pisanski, mathematician, in Ljubljana, Yugoslavia (now in Slovenia)

== May 25, 1949 (Wednesday) ==
- Chinese Communist forces captured Shanghai.
- Died: Simon Spoor, 47, Dutch military commander during the Indonesian National Revolution

== May 26, 1949 (Thursday) ==
- Pope Pius XII proclaimed 1950 as a Holy Year.
- Born: Jeremy Corbyn, politician, in Chippenham, England; Pam Grier, actress, in Winston-Salem, North Carolina; Hank Williams Jr., country musician, in Shreveport, Louisiana; Philip Michael Thomas, actor and musician, in Columbus, Ohio
- Died: Euday L. Bowman, 61, American pianist and composer of ragtime and blues

== May 27, 1949 (Friday) ==
- Gerhart Eisler was set free by a British magistrate who ruled that the US offense with which he was charged was not extraditable.
- Born: Jo Ann Harris, actress, in Los Angeles
- Died: Robert Ripley, 58, American cartoonist, entertainer and creator of Ripley's Believe It or Not!

== May 28, 1949 (Saturday) ==
- Striking Bolivian tin miners in Catavi rioted when Army troops moved in to operate the mines, resulting in 52 deaths.
- Born: Martin Kelner, journalist and radio personality, in Prestwich, England; Wendy O. Williams, punk rock musician, in Webster, New York (d. 1998)

== May 29, 1949 (Sunday) ==
- The 24-day Ford strike ended when both sides accepted an agreement to take the dispute over work speeds to arbitration.
- The 1st and 2nd British Academy Film Awards were handed out at the Odeon Theatre in Leicester Square, London for films shown in the United Kingdom in 1947 and 1948. Odd Man Out won for Best British Picture of 1947 and The Fallen Idol won for 1948.
- Born: Francis Rossi, singer and guitarist of the rock band Status Quo, in Forest Hill, London, England

== May 30, 1949 (Monday) ==
- In Paris, Soviet Foreign Minister Andrey Vyshinsky rejected Western proposals for unifying Germany by extending the West German constitution to the entire country.
- Bill Holland won the Indianapolis 500.
- Died: Emmanuel Célestin Suhard, 75, Arbishop of Paris

== May 31, 1949 (Tuesday) ==
- Argentina and Britain signed a five-year commercial treaty calling for at least £80 million each way in trade per year.
- The Luxembourg Chamber of Deputies ratified the North Atlantic Treaty by a vote of 46 to 5.
- Sam Snead won the 1949 PGA Championship.
- Born: Tom Berenger, actor, in Chicago, Illinois
