= April 1949 =

Month of 1949

<<	April 1949					>>
Su	Mo	Tu	We	Th	Fr	Sa
					1	2
3	4	5	6	7	8	9
10	11	12	13	14	15	16
17	18	19	20	21	22	23
24	25	26	27	28	29	30

The following events occurred in April 1949:

== April 1, 1949 (Friday) ==
- Soldiers of the Chinese Nationalist government injured 101 students who were protesting outside the office of Acting President Li Zongren in Nanjing.
- Joey Smallwood took office as 1st Premier of Newfoundland.
- Born: Sheck Exley, American cave diver (d. 1994); Paul Manafort, American lobbyist, political consultant, lawyer, and convicted felon, in New Britain, Connecticut; Gérard Mestrallet, businessman, in Paris, France; Gil Scott-Heron, jazz poet and author, in Chicago, Illinois (d. 2011)
- Died: Evelyn Owen, 44, Australian designer of the Owen Gun (cardiac syncope)

== April 2, 1949 (Saturday) ==
- All restrictions on electric signs in the United Kingdom were lifted for the first time in ten years.
- Born: Pamela Reed, actress, in Tacoma, Washington
- Died: George Graves, 73, English comic actor; Chandra Mohan, 42, Indian actor

== April 3, 1949 (Sunday) ==
- Israel and Transjordan signed a general armistice agreement, leaving Syria as the last Arab country with which Israel had yet to make peace.
- Government forces in Costa Rica put down a coup attempt.

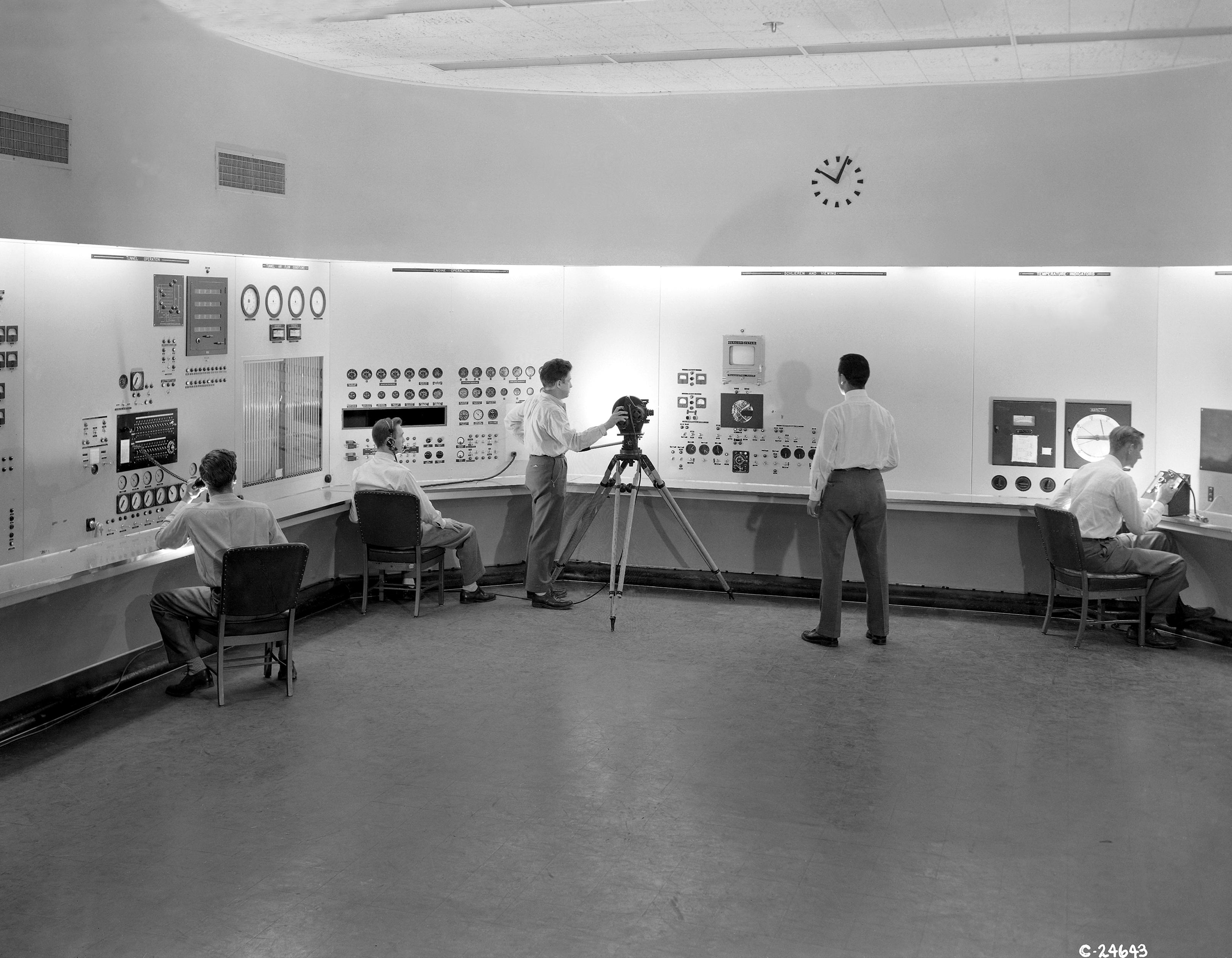
Control room of the 8x6-Foot Supersonic Wind Tunnel

- The 8x6-Foot Supersonic Wind Tunnel began operation at the National Advisory Committee for Aeronautics' Lewis Flight Propulsion Laboratory in Cleveland, Ohio (now the Glenn Research Center).
- Born: Richard Thompson, folk rock musician, in Notting Hill, England

== April 4, 1949 (Monday) ==
- The North Atlantic Treaty was signed in Washington, establishing the North Atlantic Treaty Organization (NATO).
- A court judge in Paris ruled that Victor Kravchenko had been libeled by the Communist weekly Les Lettres Françaises when it published a series of articles claiming that his best-selling book about life in the Soviet Union, I Chose Freedom, had been ghostwritten by American agents and was full of lies. Kravchenko was awarded 150,000 francs (about $500 US) in damages although this would later be drastically reduced on appeal.

== April 5, 1949 (Tuesday) ==
- 69 people were killed in a hospital fire in Effingham, Illinois.
- Born: Judith Resnik, engineer and astronaut who was killed in the Space Shuttle Challenger disaster, in Akron, Ohio (d. 1986)

== April 6, 1949 (Wednesday) ==
- On Budget Day in the United Kingdom, Chancellor of the Exchequer Sir Stafford Cripps surprisingly increased taxes by £35 million instead of cutting them as was widely expected. Despite a projected net invisible income of £100 million in 1948, Cripps said that it was "quite impossible to reduce taxation as long as the defence and social services were produced on the present scale."
- Born: Horst Ludwig Störmer, physicist and Nobel laureate, in Frankfurt, Germany
- Died: Seymour Hicks, 78, British actor

== April 7, 1949 (Thursday) ==
- County council elections in London resulted in a heavy defeat for the Labour Party, which lost the majority it had held for 15 years. The results were seen as a rejection of the Cripps austerity budget.
- The Rodgers and Hammerstein stage musical South Pacific opened at the Majestic Theatre on Broadway.
- The musical comedy film A Connecticut Yankee in King Arthur's Court starring Bing Crosby, Rhonda Fleming and William Bendix premiered at Radio City Music Hall in New York.
- Born: Zygmunt Zimowski, prelate of the Roman Catholic Church, in Kupienin, Poland (d. 2016)
- Died: Mikhail Denisenko, 49, Soviet general (parachute accident)

== April 8, 1949 (Friday) ==
- The Soviet Union vetoed South Korea's application for admission to the United Nations.
- Three-year old Kathy Fiscus died after falling into a well in San Marino, California. The attempted rescue was broadcast live on KTLA, marking a watershed event in live television coverage.
- Born: Fanie de Jager, singer, in Newcastle, KwaZulu-Natal, South Africa; Brenda Russell, singer-songwriter and keyboardist, in Brooklyn, New York
- Died: Wilhelm Adam, 71, German general; Santiago Alba y Bonifaz, 76, Spanish politician and lawyer

== April 9, 1949 (Saturday) ==
- The International Court of Justice decided the Corfu Channel case, finding Albania responsible for the 1946 Corfu Channel incident in which two British destroyers were heavily damaged by mines.
- The US House Appropriations Committee voted a postwar record $16 billion to the armed forces for the next fiscal year.
- The first telethon in history was broadcast, hosted by Milton Berle, for the Damon Runyon Memorial Fund. Over $1 million was raised for cancer research.

== April 10, 1949 (Sunday) ==
- Sam Snead won the Masters Tournament by three strokes. This was the first year that the famous green jacket was awarded to the tournament winner.
- Point of No Return by John P. Marquand began its five-month run atop The New York Times Fiction Best Seller list.
- Died: Fred Thompson, 65, English playwright

== April 11, 1949 (Monday) ==
- Italian Foreign Minister Carlo Sforza asked the United Nations to return Italy's prewar African colonies, promising that Italy would prepare them for independence at the earliest possible date.
- South Africa's Assembly passed a constitutional amendment granting parliamentary representation to South-West Africa.
- The four-day Oldstone Conference on quantum mechanics opened at Oldstone-on-the-Hudson in Peekskill, New York.
- Born: Bernd Eichinger, filmmaker, in Neuburg an der Donau, Germany (d. 2011)
- Died: Chase Osborn, 89, American politician, explorer and newspaper reporter and publisher

== April 12, 1949 (Tuesday) ==
- The Soviet Union agreed to give Albania equipment and materials on credit to compensate for the loss of trade with Yugoslavia.
- Pravda accused the West of sending intelligence agents to Mount Ararat near the Turkish-Soviet border posing as archaeologists hunting for Noah's Ark.

== April 13, 1949 (Wednesday) ==
- The Olympia earthquake centered between Olympia and Tacoma, Washington killed 8 people and did $25 million damage.
- Israel signed a ceasefire with Syria, the last opposing Arab state in Palestine.
- The Minneapolis Lakers beat the Washington Capitols 77–56 to win the 3rd Basketball Association of America Finals, four games to two.
- Born: Christopher Hitchens, writer, journalist and social critic, in Portsmouth, England (d. 2011)
- Died: Bernardo Ortiz de Montellano, 50, Mexican poet, literary critic and editor

== April 14, 1949 (Thursday) ==
- The Ministries Trial ended in Nuremberg fifteen months after it began, making it the longest of the subsequent Nuremberg Trials and the last one to end. Two defendants were acquitted but the other nineteen were found guilty of at least one charge and given prison sentences ranging from three years including time served to 25 years' imprisonment.
- By a vote of 43–6, the UN General Assembly approved a resolution asking the Big Five powers not to use their veto in cases involving requests for UN membership, peaceful settlement of international disputes or appointment of inquiry commissions.
- Born: John Shea, actor, producer and director, in North Conway, New Hampshire
- Died: Reginald Hine, 65, English solicitor and historian (suicide by jumping in front of a train)

== April 15, 1949 (Friday) ==
- On Good Friday, Pope Pius XII issued the encyclical Redemptoris nostri cruciatus focusing on the war in Palestine.
- Born: Alla Pugacheva, singer, in Moscow, USSR; Aleksandra Ziółkowska-Boehm, writer and academic, in Łódź, Poland
- Died: Wallace Beery, 64, American film actor

== April 16, 1949 (Saturday) ==
- US and British planes flew a record total of 12,941 tons of supplies into Berlin in a 24-hour period.
- Czechoslovakia and Hungary signed a treaty of friendship and mutual military aid in Budapest to complete a web of twenty-one such treaties among the Eastern Bloc countries.
- The Toronto Maple Leafs defeated the Detroit Red Wings 3–1 to win the Stanley Cup of hockey in a four-game sweep. It was the Leafs' third consecutive Stanley Cup and the eighth in franchise history.
- The musical comedy film My Dream Is Yours starring Jack Carson, Doris Day, and Lee Bowman was released.
- Born: Sandy Hawley, jockey, in Oshawa, Ontario, Canada
- Died: Archie Mitchell, 63, English footballer and manager

== April 17, 1949 (Sunday) ==
- The Chinese Communists gave the Nationalist government until April 20 to sign surrender terms. The consequences of refusal were not stated, but it was obviously a threat to invade southern China.

== April 18, 1949 (Monday) ==
- Éire formally became the Republic of Ireland as the Republic of Ireland Act took effect, cutting the last link with the United Kingdom.
- Born: Geoff Bodine, motor-sport driver, in Chemung, New York; Bengt Holmström, economist, in Helsinki, Finland
- Died: Will Hay, 60, English comedian and actor

== April 19, 1949 (Tuesday) ==
- The Nationalist Chinese government turned down the Chinese peace ultimatum as tantamount to unconditional surrender, but asked for a ceasefire and further negotiations.
- US President Harry S. Truman signed a bill extending the Marshall Plan for another 15 months.
- New York Governor Thomas E. Dewey vetoed a controversial bill designed to outlaw the sale of comic books with objectionable content, saying the language of the legislation was overly vague and sweeping to the point of being unenforceable.
- Gösta Leandersson won the 53rd Boston Marathon.
- During pregame ceremonies at the New York Yankees season opener against the Washington Senators, a plaque for the late Babe Ruth was unveiled alongside the other center field monuments.
- Born: Sergey Volkov, figure skater, in Moscow, USSR (d. 1990)
- Died: Guillermo Buitrago, 29, Colombian composer and songwriter; Ulrich Salchow, 71, Swedish figure skater

== April 20, 1949 (Wednesday) ==
- Amethyst Incident: Two British warships were shelled as Chinese communists opened a new offensive along the Yangtze River.
- US Defense Secretary Louis A. Johnson ordered the military to assign qualified Negroes "to any type of position vacancy in organizations or overhead installations without regard to race."
- Born: Veronica Cartwright, actress, in Bristol, England; Massimo D'Alema, 53rd Prime Minister of Italy, in Rome; Jessica Lange, actress, in Cloquet, Minnesota; Alexander Maltsev, ice hockey player, in Kirovo-Chepetsk, USSR

== April 21, 1949 (Thursday) ==
- President Truman accepted the resignation of Army Secretary Kenneth Claiborne Royall and named David K. E. Bruce as the new American ambassador to France.
- A few minutes before midnight, the US Senate voted 57–13 in favor of a housing and slum clearance bill that planned to erect 810,000 public housing units by 1955.
- Born: Patti LuPone, actress and singer, in Northport, New York

== April 22, 1949 (Friday) ==
- The 1949 Commonwealth Prime Ministers' Conference opened in London.
- By a vote of 34–6, the United Nations Ad Hoc Political Committee adopted a Bolivian resolution expressing deep concern at allegations that Hungary and Bulgaria had violated human rights in the recent trials of churchmen.
- Born: Spencer Haywood, basketball player, in Silver City, Mississippi
- Died: Charles Middleton, 74, American actor

== April 23, 1949 (Saturday) ==
- The Chinese Communists captured Nanjing.
- US Defense Secretary Louis A. Johnson ordered cessation of work on the Navy's 65,000-ton supercarrier United States.
- Before a dinner audience of 2,300 people at the Waldorf-Astoria Hotel in New York, Israeli President Chaim Weizmann reiterated Israel's refusal to permit internationalization of Jerusalem but agreed to allow international control over holy places in the city.
- Born: Joyce DeWitt, actress, in Wheeling, West Virginia
- Died: Robert Smith-Barry, 63, British aviator and one of the first officers of the Royal Flying Corps

== April 24, 1949 (Sunday) ==
- The Taiyuan Campaign ended in Communist victory.
- The Soviet Union seriously stepped up efforts to jam Voice of America broadcasts into the USSR, with at least 100 long-distance skywave and 250 local groundwave jammers devoted to this purpose.
- Seven years of candy rationing ended in Britain. However, demand outstripped supply to such a degree that sweets would be rationed again just four months later and not be de-rationed for good until 1953.
- The 3rd Tony Awards ceremony was held in New York. Death of a Salesman won Best Play, while Kiss Me, Kate won Best Musical.
- Born: Véronique Sanson, singer and songwriter, in Boulogne-Billancourt, France

== April 25, 1949 (Monday) ==
- By a vote of 39–6, the United Nations General Assembly adopted a resolution holding that the USSR's refusal to allow Russian wives to join their husbands abroad was a violation of the UN charter.

== April 26, 1949 (Tuesday) ==
- The Soviet Union offered to end the Berlin Blockade if the Western powers would set a date for a Big Four foreign ministers' conference on Germany. The offer was accepted that same day, but on the condition that no secret strings were attached.
- John L. Sullivan resigned as United States Secretary of the Navy in protest against the decision to abandon construction of the supercarrier.
- The country of Transjordan changed its name to the Hashemite Kingdom of Jordan.
- Bill Barris and Dick Reidel landed their converted Aeronca plane Sunkist Lady in Fullerton, California after setting a new flight endurance record of 1,008 hours and 2 minutes.
- Born: Jerry Blackwell, professional wrestler, in Stone Mountain, Georgia (d. 1995)

== April 27, 1949 (Wednesday) ==
- The Lausanne Conference of 1949 opened in Switzerland with the goal of resolving disputes arising from the recently concluded Arab-Israeli War.
- Chinese Communist forces captured Suzhou.
- The United States Air Force released an official report on flying saucers to the public, reviewing in detail many reports of unidentified flying objects. The report considered several possibilities, including Martian visitors, but discounted that theory because it was "hard to believe that any technically established race would come here, flaunt its ability in mysterious ways over the years, but each time simply go away without ever establishing contact." The report concluded: "The 'saucers' are not a joke. Neither are they a cause for alarm to the population. Many of the incidents already have answers, Meteors, Balloons, Falling stars. Birds in flight. Testing devices, etc. Some of them still end in question marks. It is the mission of the AMC Technical Intelligence Division's Project 'Saucer' to supply the periods."
- The first Canadian Film Awards ceremony was held in Ottawa. The Loon's Necklace won the first award for Film of the Year.
- The adventure drama film We Were Strangers starring Jennifer Jones and John Garfield was released.
- Died: Evan Morgan, 2nd Viscount Tredegar, 55, Welsh poet and author

== April 28, 1949 (Thursday) ==
- The London Declaration concerning India's status in the Commonwealth of Nations was issued at the Commonwealth Prime Ministers' Conference.
- The International Olympic Committee named Melbourne, Australia and Cortina d'Ampezzo, Italy as the host cities of the 1956 Summer and Winter Olympics, respectively.
- Born: Bruno Kirby, actor and comedian, in New York City (d. 2006)
- Died: Chairil Anwar, 26, Indonesian poet (unknown illness); Aurora Quezon, 61, First Lady of the Philippines 1935–1944 (assassinated)

== April 29, 1949 (Friday) ==
- The worst rail disaster in the history of South Africa took place in Orlando, Soweto when a triple train collision killed 74 people and injured more than 90 others. The accident was attributed to a faulty block signal system.
- Canada ratified the North Atlantic Treaty, making it the first of the signatory nations to do so.
- The 1949 Commonwealth Prime Ministers' Conference concluded in London.
- Italy established formal trade relations with Western Germany by signing a one-year trade agreement worth $60 million US.
- New York Giants manager Leo Durocher was suspended from baseball indefinitely for allegedly fighting with a fan following the previous day's game at the Polo Grounds.

== April 30, 1949 (Saturday) ==
- The 20th Canadian Parliament was dissolved and new elections called for June 27.
- Wolverhampton Wanderers defeated Leicester City 3–1 in the FA Cup Final at Wembley Stadium.
- Born: António Guterres, politician and 9th Secretary-General of the United Nations, in Lisbon, Portugal
