= June 1949 Syrian presidential election =

- 25 June 1949
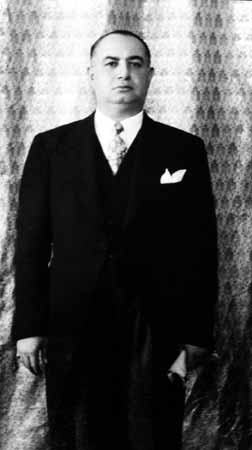
Nominee	Husni al-Za'im
Party	Independent
Alliance	SSNP
Popular vote	726,116
Percentage	99.4%
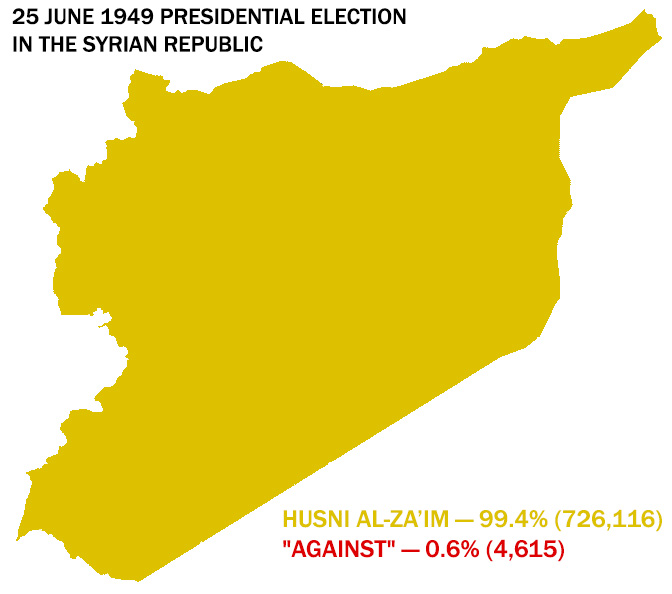
Elected President
Husni al-Za'im
Independent

A referendum on Husni al-Za'im's candidacy for president was held in Syria on 25 June 1949, alongside a referendum on presidential powers. Al-Zaim's candidacy was reportedly approved by 99% of voters.

== Results ==
Candidate	Party	Votes	%
Husni al-Za'im	Independent	726,116	99.37
Against		4,615	0.63
Total		730,731	100.00
Registered voters/turnout		816,321	–
Source: Nohlen et al.
