= George Aubourne Clarke =

Scottish meteorologist

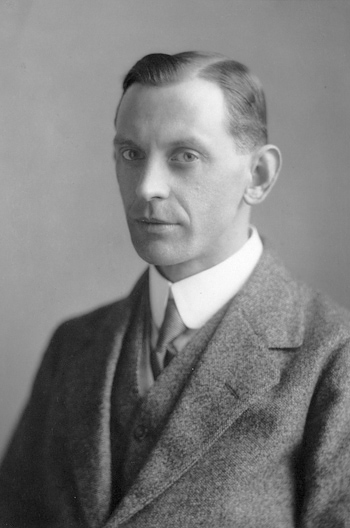
George Auborne Clarke by Elsie H. Anderson

George Aubourne Clarke (1879 – 13 February 1949) was a Scottish meteorologist, best known for his photographs of cloud types.

From 1903 to 1943, he was the meteorological observer at the Cromwell Tower Observatory at the University of Aberdeen. While there he made photographs of clouds, which were published in a book that became the standard reference for meteorologists and the military.

He was awarded the first Hood medal from the Royal Photographic Society in 1933 for his work as a photographer.

He retired in 1947 and died two years later, aged 69.

== Publications ==
- Clouds; a Descriptive Illustrated Guide-book to the Observation and Classification of Clouds, with a preface by Sir Napier Shaw, Constable & Company, Ltd. (1920)
