= Grady the Cow =

Cow that was stuck inside a storage silo in 1949

Grady the Cow (c. 1943 – July 24, 1961) became famous for being the 1,200-pound (540 kg) cow stuck inside a storage silo on a farm in Yukon, Oklahoma, in 1949.

== Silo incident ==
On February 22, 1949, Bill and Alyene Mach's six-year-old Hereford cow, Grady, gave birth to a her third calf in a small shed next to a silo. The calf did not survive, and Grady was so jittery that veterinarian D.L. Crump tied her to a post. The moment she was eventually freed, Grady whirled around and chased Bill, who jumped on a pile of cottonseed sacks to escape.

Grady dove for the only light in the shed, which was from the small opening to the silo; the opening was only 17 inches wide and 25 and a half inches high. Mach and Dr. Crump looked toward the silo opening and saw a few red hairs clinging to the edge of the heavy steel silo door. Grady was in the silo. The opening could not be made wider because it was encased in steel. Mach did not want to tear down the silo as it was too valuable, nor did he want to slaughter Grady, who was worth over $1,000.

Bill Mach asked for help via his local newspaper and got an overwhelming response, receiving about 5,400 letters and 700 telegrams from 45 states and various countries. Visitors appeared at the Mach farm with suggested solutions, the most common of which were a tunnel, grease, and a derrick. More unique suggestions included rigging a pole to swing her out the top of the silo, and bringing an attractive bull to the opening to lure her. The efforts were unsuccessful and Grady remained known as a "bovine damsel in distress". An Air Force officer said he knew of a helicopter that would lift 1,200 pounds (540 kg) but it was in San Marcos, Texas.

Three days after Grady's leap, The Denver Post announced it would fly farming expert Ralph Partridge to the Oklahoma to rescue Grady. The next morning, with dozens of onlookers, Partridge built a ramp to the silo's opening and coated it with axle grease. He slathered 10 pounds of the grease on Grady herself. She was outfitted with two heavy halters, milked by an agriculture teacher who went into the silo, and when she was close to the opening, she was injected with tranquilizers. Many men pulled and pushed and a still-awake Grady wriggled until she finally slid to freedom through the small opening.

Following her escape, Grady had swelling on her shoulder and a bruised milk sack, and she rested with army blankets for several days until Bill Mach noticed her gain energy, saying, "When a cow like Grady starts getting peppy, you can figure she's better."

== Later life and legacy ==
Grady was a local celebrity for the rest of her life. In the aftermath of the incident, thousands of visitors flocked to the farm, which was just one mile from Route 66. The farm continued to receive hundreds of daily letters from fans, as well as a box of Florida grapefruits from famed bull Ernesto Jr. who had recently become famous for picking fruit on his hind legs. The Machs announced they would sent thank-you notes on customized stationery with Grady's picture because "Grady would want us to do that."

The March 7, 1949, issue of Life magazine featured a picture taken from the top of the silo that showed Grady trapped inside it; text at one corner of the picture read, "Imprisoned by the concrete walls of a silo, an Oklahoma cow eyes the tiny opening ... through which she entered and later escaped."

On April 21, she marched in the Capitol Hill '89ers Parade in Oklahoma City escorted by 75 mounted horsemen but reportedly "appeared bored by the parade". Later that year, she was exhibited at the Oklahoma State Fair. She gave birth three more times after the incident for a total of four heifers and two bulls delivered over her life. Machs were careful to keep the silo door shut. Tourists regularly came to see her on the Mach farm, and she was such a tourist attraction that Mach put up a sign on Route 66 noting her home. He kept Grady in a special pen by the road.

Grady died on July 24, 1961. The old silo was torn down in 1997, and a regional hospital was built on the site.

Ralph Patridge died in 1990 and his obituary mentioned his heroic cow rescue. Two children's books have been written describing and illustrating the story of Grady the Cow. The first, The Cow in the Silo, was published in 1950 by Wonder Book Company. The second, Grady's In the Silo, won the 2004 Oklahoma Book Award for Children's Literature. The story of Grady has also been featured in a school curriculum for kindergarten through second grade published by the Oklahoma State University Extension Service.
