= 1949 Syrian presidential powers referendum =

A referendum on presidential powers was held in Syria on 25 June 1949, alongside a referendum on Husni al-Za'im's candidacy for the presidency. Voters were asked whether they approved of four proposals, voting separately on each one. All four proposals were approved.

== Questions ==
Four questions appeared on the ballot paper:

1. Do you wish the president to be elected for the first time by the people by a general secret ballot, chosen from among Syrians in possession of their civil rights who are aged forty years or more at the time of their candidacy and whose election is proclaimed by the council of ministers, and for a duration determined by the constitution?
2. Do you wish the president to receive by a decree adopted in the council of ministers the authority to establish a new constitution within a period of not more than four months from the date of his election and that will have to be directly approved by the people or the council of ministers?
3. Do you wish the president to be given the authority to promulgate decrees including constitutional decrees taken in the council of ministers until a new constitution is drafted and approved?
4. Do you wish to consider the authority granted to the president as defined in question 3 as having effect for all decrees adopted since 30 March 1949?
