= Svetlana Dambinova =

Russian neuroscientist

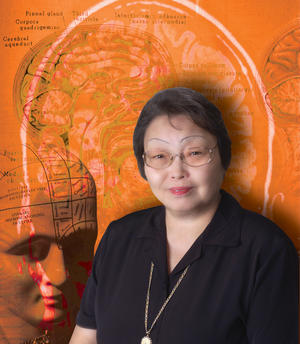
- Born: Svetlana Dambinova; March 15, 1949 (age 77); Irkutsk, Russian Federation
- Education: Irkutsk State University (BA, 1971); Research Institute of Experimental Medicine (PhD, 1976 and D.Sc., 1985)
- Scientific career
- Fields: Neuroscience; Neurochemistry; Glutamate receptor
- Workplaces: Laboratory of biomarkers Dekalb Medical Center, Atlanta, GA; Emory University; Kennesaw State University; Institute of Human Brain, Russia; Research Institute of Experimental Medicine; First Pavlov State Medical University of St. Petersburg

Svetlana Dambinova (Russian: Светла́на Алекса́ндровна Дамбинова; born March 15, 1949, in Irkutsk) is a Russian neuroscientist, Doctor of Biological Sciences, Distinguished Professor at Laboratory of biomarkers at Medical Center "DeKalb", Atlanta, USA. Dambinova was awarded as Honored Worker of Science of the Republic of Buryatia (1996) and Russian Federation (1998). Known in the world for research of glutamate receptors. The Head of the project of the International Department of Neurology SPBGMU them. Acad. Pavlov's.

== Education and early life ==
Dambinova was born in Irkuts Region, she was studied at school in Ulan-Ude city, Republic of Buryatia, at 1966 she graduated from school with honors. She earned her bachelor's degree in biochemistry from Irkutsk State University at faculty "Chemistry of Natural Compounds". In 1971 she attended two year traineeship at Siberian Institute of Plant Physiology and Biochemistry Russian Academy of Sciences. Dambinova continued postgraduate study at Research Institute of Experimental Medicine. In 1976 Dambinova defended her PhD thesis "Histone RNA synthesizing activity in denervated skeletal muscles and neurotropic regulation" the specialty biochemistry. In 1980 Dambinova organized the Laboratory of Functional Neurochemistry at Research Institute of Experimental Medicine, and in 1990 the Laboratory of Molecular Neurobiology at Institute of Human Brain, Russia, where she studied molecular properties of ionotropic glutamate receptor. In 1988, Dambinova obtained her Doctor of Science degree.

== Research ==
Between 1989 and 1990, Dambinova was invited by Dr. E. Freeze, Director of the Neuroscience Program at NINDS, NIH to engage in a glutamate receptors gene project. Her research accomplishments included studying the role of ionotropic glutamate receptor in mechanisms of epilepsy, stroke, drug abuse, and traumatic brain injury. Her monograph "Neuroreceptors of Glutamate", concerning the significance of NMDA and AMPA receptors in the neurotoxicity cascade underlying brain pathology. Between 1980 and 2000, Dambinova contributed to neurochemical research of human deep intracranial electrical stimulation in neurodegenerative disorders and phantom pain (about 60 publications out of a total of 280). Dambinova contributed to the Parkinson's disease cerebral ischemia and pain treatment by small endogenous peptides and developed new approaches to early diagnosis of chronic pain and addiction by detecting autoantibodies to a peptide fragment of opiate receptors. The research data obtained under Dambinova's leadership from 1992 to 2000 were devoted to the molecular organization of opiate receptors and its significance in drug addiction. Within 1995-2000 Dambinova was invited as a Visiting Professor in other non-profit, private and public research institutions in Italy, Germany, Poland, United States, Sweden and Ireland. Between 1995 and 1999, Dambinova organized the Laboratory of Neurochemistry at the non-profit private medical center Oasi Maria Institute on Mental Retardation and Aging in Troina, Sicily. Dambinova supervised the research of glutamate receptors significance in children's idiopathic epilepsy. Dambinova is ex-president of the Russian Society for Neurochemistry (1994-2000) and a Member of the Council of European Society for Neurochemistry. Since 2002, Dr. Dambinova research has focused on laboratory diagnostics of neurological disorders at First Pavlov State Medical University of St. Petersburg, Russia. She supervises the molecular studies of neuroreceptors, experimental research and she is co-PI of multicenter clinical trials in Europe, Russia, and United States. Long-term professional collaboration with clinicians and educators guided her research on the gap between basic neuroscience and neurology in the matter of development and use of brain markers for nervous system pathology Her research accomplishments were summarized in more than 350 scientific papers and 25 book chapters She co-edited 7 books including the textbook "Advanced Functional Neurochemistry", published in 2003 by St. Petersburg State University (Russia), "Biomarkers for TBI", published in 2012 by RSC Publishing House (UK), and "Biomarkers for Cerebral Ischemia", published in 2013 by Kosta, (Russia).
