= List of Billboard number-one singles of 1949 =

This is a list of number-one songs in the United States during the year 1949 according to Billboard magazine. Prior to the creation of the Billboard Hot 100, Billboard published multiple singles charts each week. In 1949, the following four charts were produced:

- Best Sellers in Stores – ranked the biggest selling singles in retail stores, as reported by merchants surveyed throughout the country.
- Most Played by Jockeys – ranked the most played songs on United States radio stations, as reported by radio disc jockeys and radio stations.
- Most Played in Jukeboxes – ranked the most played songs in jukeboxes across the United States.
- Honor Roll of Hits – a composite ten-position song chart which combined data from the three charts above along with three other component charts. It served as The Billboard's lead chart until the introduction of the Hot 100 in 1958 and would remain in print until 1963.

Note: In the issue dated September 10, The Billboard reported a tie for the number-one single on one of its charts.

Issue date	Best-Selling Popular Retail Records	Records Most-Played on the Air	Most-Played Juke Box Records	Honor Roll of Hits	Ref.
January 1	"Buttons and Bows"; Dinah Shore and her Happy Valley Boys	"All I Want for Christmas (Is My Two Front Teeth)"; Spike Jones and his City Slickers with George Rock	"Buttons and Bows"; Dinah Shore and her Happy Valley Boys	"Buttons and Bows"	
January 8	"All I Want for Christmas (Is My Two Front Teeth)"; Spike Jones and his City Slickers with George Rock	"All I Want for Christmas (Is My Two Front Teeth)"; Spike Jones and his City Slickers with George Rock	"Buttons and Bows"; Dinah Shore and her Happy Valley Boys	"Buttons and Bows"	
January 15	"Buttons and Bows"; Dinah Shore and her Happy Valley Boys	"My Darling, My Darling"; Jo Stafford and Gordon MacRae	"A Little Bird Told Me"; Evelyn Knight and the Stardusters	"On a Slow Boat to China"	
January 22	"A Little Bird Told Me"; Evelyn Knight and the Stardusters	"A Little Bird Told Me"; Evelyn Knight and the Stardusters	"A Little Bird Told Me"; Evelyn Knight and the Stardusters	"A Little Bird Told Me"	
January 29	"A Little Bird Told Me"; Evelyn Knight and the Stardusters	"A Little Bird Told Me"; Evelyn Knight and the Stardusters	"A Little Bird Told Me"; Evelyn Knight and the Stardusters	"A Little Bird Told Me"	
February 5	"A Little Bird Told Me"; Evelyn Knight and the Stardusters	"A Little Bird Told Me"; Evelyn Knight and the Stardusters	"A Little Bird Told Me"; Evelyn Knight and the Stardusters	"A Little Bird Told Me"	
February 12	"A Little Bird Told Me"; Evelyn Knight and the Stardusters	"A Little Bird Told Me"; Evelyn Knight and the Stardusters	"A Little Bird Told Me"; Evelyn Knight and the Stardusters	"A Little Bird Told Me"	
February 19	"A Little Bird Told Me"; Evelyn Knight and the Stardusters	"A Little Bird Told Me"; Evelyn Knight and the Stardusters	"A Little Bird Told Me"; Evelyn Knight and the Stardusters	"A Little Bird Told Me"	
February 26	"A Little Bird Told Me"; Evelyn Knight and the Stardusters	"A Little Bird Told Me"; Evelyn Knight and the Stardusters	"A Little Bird Told Me"; Evelyn Knight and the Stardusters	"Far Away Places"	
March 5	"A Little Bird Told Me"; Evelyn Knight and the Stardusters	"I've Got My Love to Keep Me Warm"; Les Brown and his Orchestra	"Powder Your Face with Sunshine (Smile! Smile! Smile!)"; Evelyn Knight and the Stardusters	"Far Away Places"	
March 12	"Cruising Down the River"; Blue Barron and his Orchestra	"Cruising Down the River"; Blue Barron and his Orchestra	"Cruising Down the River"; Blue Barron and his Orchestra	"Cruising Down the River"	
March 19	"Cruising Down the River"; Blue Barron and his Orchestra	"Cruising Down the River"; Blue Barron and his Orchestra	"Cruising Down the River"; Blue Barron and his Orchestra	"Cruising Down the River"	
March 26	"Cruising Down the River"; Russ Morgan and His Orchestra with the Skylarks	"Cruising Down the River"; Blue Barron and his Orchestra	"Cruising Down the River"; Blue Barron and his Orchestra	"Cruising Down the River"	
April 2	"Cruising Down the River"; Russ Morgan and His Orchestra with the Skylarks	"Cruising Down the River"; Blue Barron and his Orchestra	"Cruising Down the River"; Russ Morgan and His Orchestra with The Skylarks	"Cruising Down the River"	
April 9	"Cruising Down the River"; Russ Morgan and His Orchestra with the Skylarks	"Cruising Down the River"; Blue Barron and his Orchestra	"Cruising Down the River"; Russ Morgan and His Orchestra with The Skylarks	"Cruising Down the River"	
April 16	"Cruising Down the River"; Russ Morgan and His Orchestra with the Skylarks	"Cruising Down the River"; Blue Barron and his Orchestra	"Cruising Down the River"; Russ Morgan and His Orchestra with The Skylarks	"Cruising Down the River"	
April 23	"Cruising Down the River"; Russ Morgan and His Orchestra with the Skylarks	"Cruising Down the River"; Blue Barron and his Orchestra	"Cruising Down the River"; Russ Morgan and His Orchestra with The Skylarks	"Cruising Down the River"	
April 30	"Cruising Down the River"; Russ Morgan and His Orchestra with the Skylarks	"Careless Hands"; Mel Tormé with Sonny Burke and His Orchestra	"Cruising Down the River"; Russ Morgan and His Orchestra with The Skylarks	"Cruising Down the River"	
May 7	"Cruising Down the River"; Russ Morgan and His Orchestra with the Skylarks	""A"—You're Adorable"; Perry Como with the Fontane Sisters and Orchestra conducted by Mitchell Ayres	"Cruising Down the River"; Russ Morgan and His Orchestra with The Skylarks	"Cruising Down the River"	
May 14	"Riders in the Sky (A Cowboy Legend)"; Vaughn Monroe and his Orchestra	""A"—You're Adorable"; Perry Como with the Fontane Sisters and Orchestra conducted by Mitchell Ayres	"Forever and Ever"; Russ Morgan and His Orchestra with The Skylarks	"Forever and Ever"	
May 21	"Riders in the Sky (A Cowboy Legend)"; Vaughn Monroe and his Orchestra	"Riders in the Sky (A Cowboy Legend)"; Vaughn Monroe and his Orchestra	"Forever and Ever"; Russ Morgan and His Orchestra with The Skylarks	"Forever and Ever"	
May 28	"Riders in the Sky (A Cowboy Legend)"; Vaughn Monroe and his Orchestra	"Riders in the Sky (A Cowboy Legend)"; Vaughn Monroe and his Orchestra	"Forever and Ever"; Russ Morgan and His Orchestra with The Skylarks	"Riders in the Sky"	
June 4	"Riders in the Sky (A Cowboy Legend)"; Vaughn Monroe and his Orchestra	"Riders in the Sky (A Cowboy Legend)"; Vaughn Monroe and his Orchestra	"Riders in the Sky (A Cowboy Legend)"; Vaughn Monroe and his Orchestra	"Riders in the Sky"	
June 11	"Riders in the Sky (A Cowboy Legend)"; Vaughn Monroe and his Orchestra	"Riders in the Sky (A Cowboy Legend)"; Vaughn Monroe and his Orchestra	"Riders in the Sky (A Cowboy Legend)"; Vaughn Monroe and his Orchestra	"Riders in the Sky"	
June 18	"Riders in the Sky (A Cowboy Legend)"; Vaughn Monroe and his Orchestra	"Riders in the Sky (A Cowboy Legend)"; Vaughn Monroe and his Orchestra	"Riders in the Sky (A Cowboy Legend)"; Vaughn Monroe and his Orchestra	"Riders in the Sky"	
June 25	"Riders in the Sky (A Cowboy Legend)"; Vaughn Monroe and his Orchestra	"Riders in the Sky (A Cowboy Legend)"; Vaughn Monroe and his Orchestra	"Riders in the Sky (A Cowboy Legend)"; Vaughn Monroe and his Orchestra	"Riders in the Sky"	
July 2	"Riders in the Sky (A Cowboy Legend)"; Vaughn Monroe and his Orchestra	"Riders in the Sky (A Cowboy Legend)"; Vaughn Monroe and his Orchestra	"Riders in the Sky (A Cowboy Legend)"; Vaughn Monroe and his Orchestra	"Riders in the Sky"	
July 9	"Riders in the Sky (A Cowboy Legend)"; Vaughn Monroe and his Orchestra	"Riders in the Sky (A Cowboy Legend)"; Vaughn Monroe and his Orchestra	"Riders in the Sky (A Cowboy Legend)"; Vaughn Monroe and his Orchestra	"Riders in the Sky"	
July 16	"Riders in the Sky (A Cowboy Legend)"; Vaughn Monroe and his Orchestra	"Riders in the Sky (A Cowboy Legend)"; Vaughn Monroe and his Orchestra	"Riders in the Sky (A Cowboy Legend)"; Vaughn Monroe and his Orchestra	"Riders in the Sky"	
July 23	"Riders in the Sky (A Cowboy Legend)"; Vaughn Monroe and his Orchestra	"Riders in the Sky (A Cowboy Legend)"; Vaughn Monroe and his Orchestra	"Riders in the Sky (A Cowboy Legend)"; Vaughn Monroe and his Orchestra	"Riders in the Sky"	
July 30	"Some Enchanted Evening"; Perry Como with Orchestra conducted by Mitchell Ayres	"Riders in the Sky (A Cowboy Legend)"; Vaughn Monroe and his Orchestra	"Riders in the Sky (A Cowboy Legend)"; Vaughn Monroe and his Orchestra	"Some Enchanted Evening"	
August 6	"Some Enchanted Evening"; Perry Como with Orchestra conducted by Mitchell Ayres	"Riders in the Sky (A Cowboy Legend)"; Vaughn Monroe and his Orchestra	"Riders in the Sky (A Cowboy Legend)"; Vaughn Monroe and his Orchestra	"Some Enchanted Evening"	
August 13	"Some Enchanted Evening"; Perry Como with Orchestra conducted by Mitchell Ayres	"Some Enchanted Evening"; Perry Como with Orchestra conducted by Mitchell Ayres	"Some Enchanted Evening"; Perry Como with Orchestra conducted by Mitchell Ayres	"Some Enchanted Evening"	
August 20	"Some Enchanted Evening"; Perry Como with Orchestra conducted by Mitchell Ayres	"Some Enchanted Evening"; Perry Como with Orchestra conducted by Mitchell Ayres	"Some Enchanted Evening"; Perry Como with Orchestra conducted by Mitchell Ayres	"Some Enchanted Evening"	
August 27	"Some Enchanted Evening"; Perry Como with Orchestra conducted by Mitchell Ayres	"You're Breaking My Heart"; Vic Damone with Glenn Osser’s Orchestra	"Some Enchanted Evening"; Perry Como with Orchestra conducted by Mitchell Ayres	"Some Enchanted Evening"	
September 3	"You're Breaking My Heart"; Vic Damone with Glenn Osser's Orchestra	"You're Breaking My Heart"; Vic Damone with Glenn Osser’s Orchestra	"Some Enchanted Evening"; Perry Como with Orchestra conducted by Mitchell Ayres	"Some Enchanted Evening"	
September 10	"You're Breaking My Heart"; Vic Damone with Glenn Osser's Orchestra	"Someday (You'll Want Me to Want You)"; Vaughn Monroe and his Orchestra	"Some Enchanted Evening"; Perry Como with Orchestra conducted by Mitchell Ayres "You're Breaking My Heart"; Vic Damone with Glenn Osser's Orchestra	"Room Full of Roses"	
September 17	"You're Breaking My Heart"; Vic Damone with Glenn Osser's Orchestra	"Someday (You'll Want Me to Want You)"; Vaughn Monroe and his Orchestra	"Someday (You'll Want Me to Want You)"; Vaughn Monroe and his Orchestra	"You're Breaking My Heart"	
September 24	"You're Breaking My Heart"; Vic Damone with Glenn Osser's Orchestra	"You're Breaking My Heart"; Vic Damone with Glenn Osser's Orchestra	"You're Breaking My Heart"; Vic Damone with Glenn Osser's Orchestra	"You're Breaking My Heart"	
October 1	"That Lucky Old Sun"; Frankie Laine with Judd Conlon's Rhythmaires, Harry Geller and His Orchestra, and Carl Fischer	"You're Breaking My Heart"; Vic Damone with Glenn Osser's Orchestra	"Someday (You'll Want Me to Want You)"; Vaughn Monroe and his Orchestra	"You're Breaking My Heart"	
October 8	"That Lucky Old Sun"; Frankie Laine with Judd Conlon's Rhythmaires, Harry Geller and His Orchestra, and Carl Fischer	"That Lucky Old Sun"; Frankie Laine with Judd Conlon's Rhythmaires, Harry Geller and His Orchestra, and Carl Fischer	"You're Breaking My Heart"; Vic Damone with Glenn Osser's Orchestra	"You're Breaking My Heart"	
October 15	"That Lucky Old Sun"; Frankie Laine with Judd Conlon's Rhythmaires, Harry Geller and His Orchestra, and Carl Fischer	"That Lucky Old Sun"; Frankie Laine with Judd Conlon's Rhythmaires, Harry Geller and His Orchestra, and Carl Fischer	"That Lucky Old Sun"; Frankie Laine with Judd Conlon's Rhythmaires, Harry Geller and His Orchestra, and Carl Fischer	"You're Breaking My Heart"	
October 22	"That Lucky Old Sun"; Frankie Laine with Judd Conlon's Rhythmaires, Harry Geller and His Orchestra, and Carl Fischer	"That Lucky Old Sun"; Frankie Laine with Judd Conlon's Rhythmaires, Harry Geller and His Orchestra, and Carl Fischer	"That Lucky Old Sun"; Frankie Laine with Judd Conlon's Rhythmaires, Harry Geller and His Orchestra, and Carl Fischer	"You're Breaking My Heart"	
October 29	"That Lucky Old Sun"; Frankie Laine with Judd Conlon's Rhythmaires, Harry Geller and His Orchestra, and Carl Fischer	"That Lucky Old Sun"; Frankie Laine with Judd Conlon's Rhythmaires, Harry Geller and His Orchestra, and Carl Fischer	"That Lucky Old Sun"; Frankie Laine with Judd Conlon's Rhythmaires, Harry Geller and His Orchestra, and Carl Fischer	"That Lucky Old Sun"	
November 5	"That Lucky Old Sun"; Frankie Laine with Judd Conlon's Rhythmaires, Harry Geller and His Orchestra, and Carl Fischer	"That Lucky Old Sun"; Frankie Laine with Judd Conlon's Rhythmaires, Harry Geller and His Orchestra, and Carl Fischer	"That Lucky Old Sun"; Frankie Laine with Judd Conlon's Rhythmaires, Harry Geller and His Orchestra, and Carl Fischer	"That Lucky Old Sun"	
November 12	"That Lucky Old Sun"; Frankie Laine with Judd Conlon's Rhythmaires, Harry Geller and His Orchestra, and Carl Fischer	"That Lucky Old Sun"; Frankie Laine with Judd Conlon's Rhythmaires, Harry Geller and His Orchestra, and Carl Fischer	"That Lucky Old Sun"; Frankie Laine with Judd Conlon's Rhythmaires, Harry Geller and His Orchestra, and Carl Fischer	"That Lucky Old Sun"	
November 19	"That Lucky Old Sun"; Frankie Laine with Judd Conlon's Rhythmaires, Harry Geller and His Orchestra, and Carl Fischer	"That Lucky Old Sun"; Frankie Laine with Judd Conlon's Rhythmaires, Harry Geller and His Orchestra, and Carl Fischer	"Slipping Around"; Margaret Whiting and Jimmy Wakely	"That Lucky Old Sun"	
November 26	"Mule Train"; Frankie Laine and the Muleskinners	"Mule Train"; Frankie Laine and the Muleskinners	"Slipping Around"; Margaret Whiting and Jimmy Wakely	"Mule Train"	
December 3	"Mule Train"; Frankie Laine and the Muleskinners	"Mule Train"; Frankie Laine and the Muleskinners	"Slipping Around"; Margaret Whiting and Jimmy Wakely	"Mule Train"	
December 10	"Mule Train"; Frankie Laine and the Muleskinners	"Mule Train"; Frankie Laine and the Muleskinners	"Mule Train"; Frankie Laine and the Muleskinners	"Mule Train"	
December 17	"Mule Train"; Frankie Laine and the Muleskinners	"Mule Train"; Frankie Laine and the Muleskinners	"Mule Train"; Frankie Laine and the Muleskinners	"Mule Train"	
December 24	"Mule Train"; Frankie Laine and the Muleskinners	"Mule Train"; Frankie Laine and the Muleskinners	"Mule Train"; Frankie Laine and the Muleskinners	"Mule Train"	
December 31	"Mule Train"; Frankie Laine and the Muleskinners	"Mule Train"; Frankie Laine and the Muleskinners	"Mule Train"; Frankie Laine and the Muleskinners	"Mule Train"	

== Number-one artists ==
List of number-one artists by total weeks at number one
Artist	Weeks at #1
Frankie Laine	14
Vaughn Monroe	11
Russ Morgan	7
Evelyn Knight	7
Perry Como	5
Vic Damone	4
Dinah Shore	2
Blue Barron	2
Spike Jones	1

== See also ==
- 1949 in music
