= 2014 Gaza War =

Armed conflict in the Gaza Strip

- Part of the Gaza–Israel conflict and the Israeli–Palestinian conflict
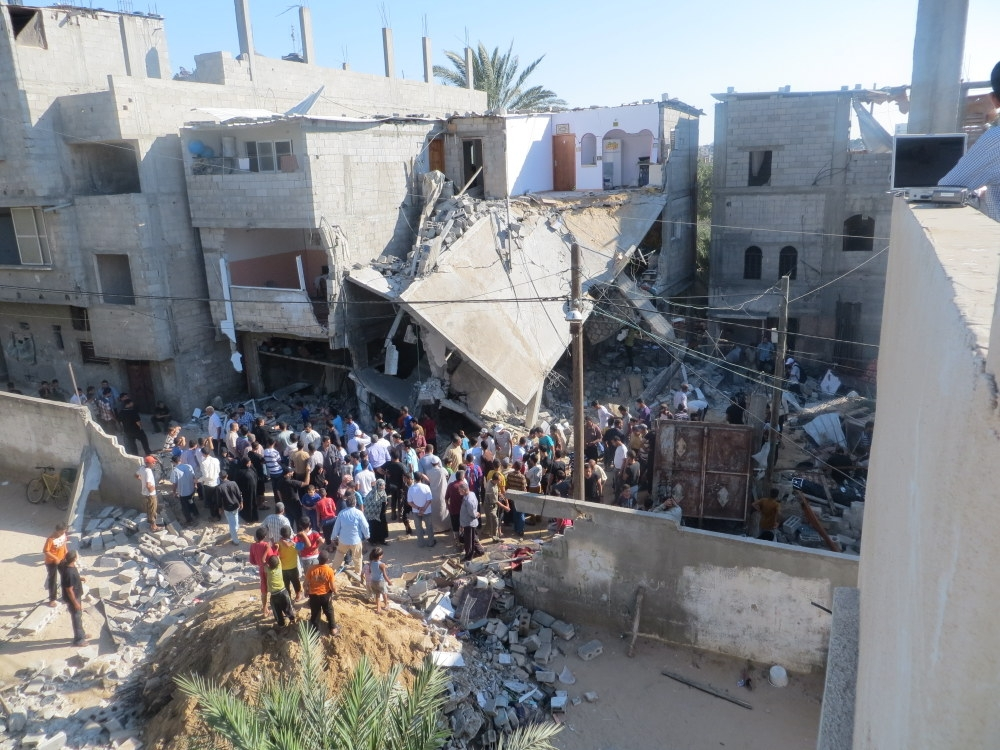
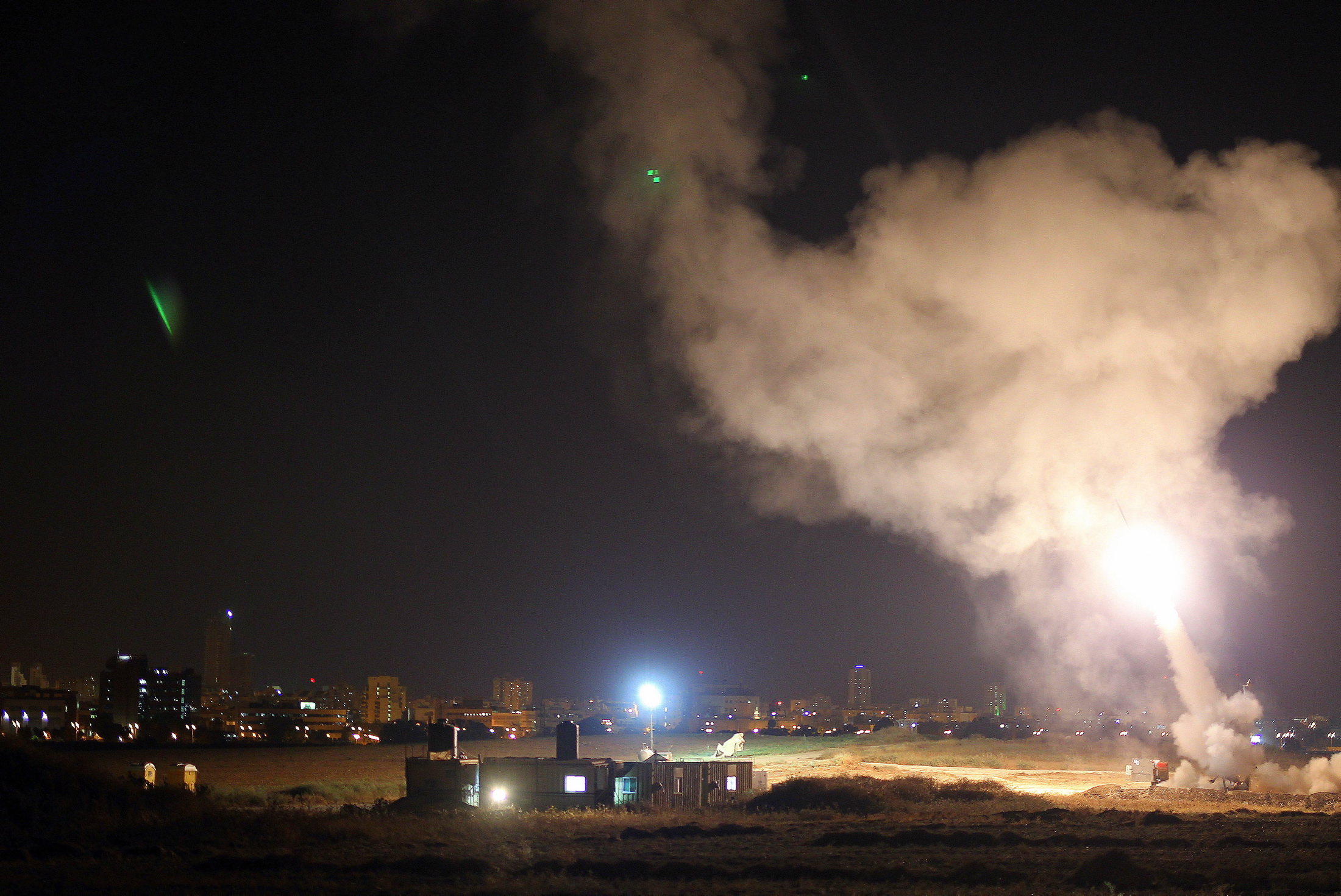
- Left, right: Destroyed Palestinian house in Gaza; Iron Dome intercepts Palestinian rockets aimed at Ashdod
Date	8 July – 26 August 2014 (1 month, 2 weeks and 4 days)
Location	Gaza Strip and Israel
Result	Both sides claim victory: According to Hamas, Israel was repelled from Gaza; According to Israel, Hamas was severely weakened and achieved none of its demands

Belligerents
Israel	Gaza Strip; Hamas; Palestinian Islamic Jihad; Popular Front for the Liberation of Palestine; Democratic Front for the Liberation of Palestine; Popular Resistance Committees; Abdullah Azzam Brigades; Jaysh al-Ummah; Al-Aqsa Martyrs' Brigades

Commanders and leaders
(Israel) Benjamin Netanyahu (Prime Minister) (Israel) Moshe Ya'alon (Defense Minister) (Israel) Benny Gantz (Chief of General Staff) (Israel) Amir Eshel (Air Force Commander) (Israel) Ram Rothberg (Naval Commander) (Israel) Sami Turgeman (Southern Commander) (Israel) Mickey Edelstein (Gaza Division) (Israel) Yoram Cohen (Chief of Shin Bet)	(Palestine) Khaled Mashal (Leader of Hamas) (Palestine) Ismail Haniyeh (Deputy Chief of Hamas) (Palestine) Mohammed Deif (Head of Izz ad-Din al-Qassam Brigades) (Palestine) Ramadan Shalah (Leader of the Palestinian Islamic Jihad)

Units involved
Israel Defense Forces; Shin Bet	(Hamas) Izz ad-Din al-Qassam Brigades; Al-Aqsa Martyrs' Brigades (Popular Front for the Liberation of Palestine) Abu Ali Mustafa Brigades (Popular Resistance Committees) Al-Nasser Salah al-Deen Brigades (Palestinian Islamic Jihad) Al-Quds Brigades

Strength
176,500 active personnel 565,000 reservists (2012 figures, of which not all are directly involved)	Al-Qassam Brigades: 20,000–40,000 Al-Quds Brigades: 8,000

Casualties and losses
67 soldiers killed 469 soldiers wounded 2 soldiers captured 6 civilians (1 Thai) killed 87 civilians wounded	Gaza Health Ministry: 2,310 killed (70% civilians), 10,626 wounded UN HRC: 2,251 killed (65% civilians); B'Tselem: 2,203 killed (64% civilians); Israeli government: 2,125 killed (Note: p. 10, para. 21: "Israel does not presume to be able to produce a definitive account of all fatalities that occurred during the 2014 Gaza Conflict.") (44% combatants); PCHR: 2,216 killed (69% civilians)
- More than 23 Palestinians executed by Hamas or Al‑Qassam for alleged espionage.

The 2014 Gaza War, also known as Operation Protective Edge (Hebrew: מִבְצָע צוּק אֵיתָן, romanized: Miv'tza Tzuk Eitan, lit. 'Operation Strong Cliff' (Note: The IDF's official Arabic name for the operation, translated into English, is "Operation Resolute Cliff".)), and Battle of the Withered Grain (Arabic: معركة العصف المأكول, romanized: Maʿrakat al-ʿAṣf al-Maʾkūl), was a military operation launched by Israel on 8 July 2014 in the Gaza Strip, a Palestinian territory governed by Hamas since 2007 and which was occupied by Israel since 1967 until its disengagement in 2005. (Note: Though Hamas governs the Gaza Strip, the majority of the international community (including the UN General Assembly, the United Nations Security Council, the European Union, the International Criminal Court, and many human rights organizations) consider Israel to be occupying Gaza, as it controls the region's airspace, coastline and most of its borders.) Following the kidnapping and murder of three Israeli teenagers in the West Bank by Palestinian militants, the Israel Defense Forces (IDF) initiated Operation Brother's Keeper, in which it killed 10 Palestinians, injured 130 and imprisoned more than 600. Hamas reportedly did not retaliate but resumed rocket attacks on Israel more than two weeks later, following the killing of one of its militants by an Israeli airstrike on 29 June. This escalation triggered a seven-week-long conflict between the two sides, one of the deadliest outbreaks of open conflict between Israel and the Palestinians in decades. The war resulted in over two thousand deaths, the vast majority of which were Gazan Palestinian civilians. This includes a total of six Israeli civilians who were killed as a result of the conflict.

The Israeli military operation aimed to stop rocket fire into Israel from the Gaza Strip. Conversely, Hamas' attacks aimed to bring international pressure onto Israel with the strategic goal of forcing the latter to lift the naval and air blockade of the Gaza Strip; among its other goals were to end Israel's attacks on Palestinians, obtain a third party to monitor and guarantee compliance with a ceasefire, release Palestinian political prisoners and overcome its isolation. According to the BBC, Israel launched airstrikes on the Gaza Strip in retaliation to the rocket attacks by Hamas, Palestinian Islamic Jihad (PIJ), and other Palestinian militant groups.

On 7 July, after seven Hamas militants died in a tunnel explosion in Khan Yunis that was caused either by an Israeli airstrike (per Hamas, Nathan Thrall, BBC, and a senior IDF official) or an accidental explosion of their own munitions (per the IDF), Hamas assumed responsibility for rockets fired into Israel, and subsequently launched 40 more rockets towards Israel. The Israeli aerial operation officially began the following day, and on 17 July, it was expanded to include a full-scale ground invasion of the Gaza Strip with the stated aim of destroying Gaza's tunnel system; the Israeli ground invasion ended on 5 August. On 26 August, an open-ended ceasefire was announced. By this time, the IDF reported that Hamas, PIJ, and other Palestinian militant groups had fired 4,564 rockets and mortars into Israel, with over 735 projectiles having been intercepted mid-flight and shot down by Israel's Iron Dome. Most Gazan mortar and rocket fire was inaccurate, and consequently hit open land; more than 280 projectiles had landed within the Gaza Strip, and 224 had struck residential areas. Palestinian rocketry also killed 13 Palestinian civilians in Gaza, 11 of them children. The IDF attacked 5,263 targets in the Gaza Strip; at least 34 known tunnels were destroyed and two-thirds of Hamas's 10,000-rocket arsenal was either used up or destroyed.

Between 2,125 and 2,310 Gazans were killed during the conflict while between 10,626 and 10,895 were wounded (including 3,374 children, of whom over 1,000 were left permanently disabled). Gazan civilian casualty estimates range between 70 percent by the Gaza Health Ministry, 65 percent by the United Nations' (UN) Protection Cluster by OCHA (based in part on Gaza Health Ministry reports), and 36 percent by Israeli officials. The UN estimated that more than 7,000 homes for 10,000 families were razed, together with an additional 89,000 homes damaged, of which roughly 10,000 were severely affected by the bombing. Rebuilding costs were calculated to run from US$4–6 billion over the course of 20 years. 67 Israeli soldiers, 5 Israeli civilians (including one child) and one Thai civilian were killed while 469 Israeli soldiers and 261 Israeli civilians were injured. On the Israeli side, the economic impact of the operation is estimated to have had an impact of ₪8.5 billion (approximately US$2.5 billion) and a GDP loss of 0.4 percent.

== Background ==
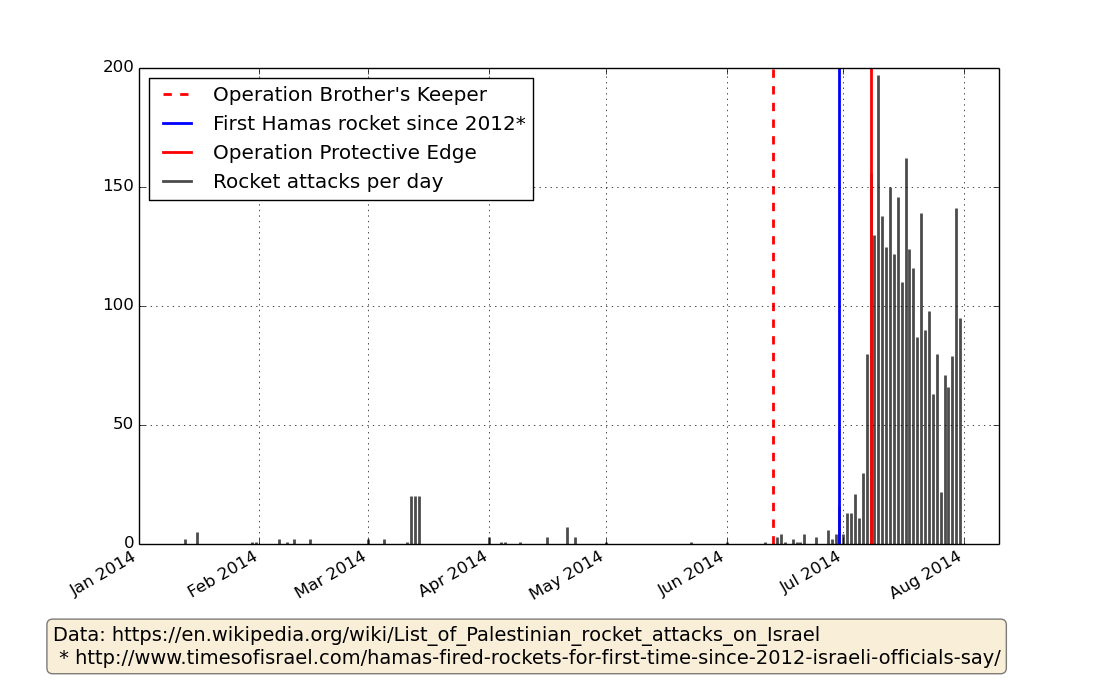
Histogram of Palestinian rocket attacks on Israel per day and start of the military operation (in red), 2014

In 2005, following the conclusion of the Second Intifada, Israel disengaged from the Gaza Strip, which it had previously occupied since 1967. The unilateral withdrawal plan began in August 2005 and was completed in September 2005. Nonetheless, the ICRC, the UN and various human rights organizations consider Israel still to be the de facto occupying power due to its control of Gaza's borders, air space and territorial waters.

In 2006, Hamas won a majority of seats in the Palestinian legislative elections. This outcome surprised Israel and the United States who had anticipated the return of the Fatah opposition to power and, together with the Quartet, they demanded Hamas accept all previous agreements, recognize Israel's right to exist, and renounce violence. When Hamas refused, stating that the demand left it "handcuffed", Israel cut off aid to the Palestinian Authority. In mid-2006, an Israeli soldier was captured by Hamas in a cross-border raid. The United States and Israel, in response to Fatah moves in October 2006 to form a unity government with Hamas, tried to undo the elections by arming and training Fatah to overthrow Hamas in Gaza. In June 2007, Hamas took complete power of Gaza by force.

Israel then defined Gaza as a "hostile territory" forming no part of a sovereign state and put Gaza under a comprehensive economic and political blockade, which also denied access to a third of its arable land and 85% of its fishing areas. It has led to considerable economic damage and humanitarian problems in Gaza. The overwhelming consensus of international institutions is that the blockade is a form of collective punishment and illegal. Israel maintains that the blockade is legal and necessary to limit Palestinian rocket attacks from the Gaza Strip on its cities and to prevent Hamas from obtaining other weapons. Israel carried out Operation Cast Lead in December 2008 with the stated aim of stopping rocket attacks from Hamas militants. The UN Fact Finding Mission on the Gaza Conflict concluded that the operation was "a deliberately disproportionate attack designed to punish, humiliate and terrorize a civilian population, radically diminish its local economic capacity both to work and to provide for itself, and to force upon it an ever increasing sense of dependency and vulnerability". The Israeli government's analysis concludes that the report perverts international law to serve a political agenda and sends a "legally unfounded message to states everywhere confronting terrorism that international law has no effective response to offer them".

=== First Hamas–Fatah reconciliation (2011) ===
Influenced in the Arab Spring and by demonstrations in Ramallah and Gaza, the gap between Hamas and Fatah was bridged in 2011. After the Palestinian president Mahmoud Abbas declared his willingness to travel to Gaza and sign an agreement, the IDF killed two Hamas activists in Gaza; the IDF stated the killings were in response to the launching of a single Qassam rocket, which hit no one, but Yedioth Ahronoth's Alex Fishman argued they were a "premeditated escalation" by Israel. In an interview with CNN, Israeli prime minister Benjamin Netanyahu declared that the reconciliation talks were calls for Israel's destruction, and strongly opposed the idea of a unity government.

=== November 2012 ceasefire and its violations ===
On 14 November 2012, Israel launched Operation Pillar of Defence in the Gaza Strip. The operation was preceded by a period with a number of mutual Israeli–Palestinian responsive attacks. According to the Israeli government, the operation began in response to the launch of over 100 rockets at Israel during a 24-hour period and an explosion caused by IEDs, which occurred near Israeli soldiers, on the Israeli side of a tunnel passing under the Israeli West Bank barrier. The Israeli government stated that the aims of the military operation were to halt rocket attacks against civilian targets originating from the Gaza Strip and to disrupt the capabilities of militant organizations. The Palestinians blamed the Israeli government for the upsurge in violence, accusing the IDF of attacks on Gazan civilians in the days leading up to the operation. They cited the blockade of the Gaza Strip and the occupation of West Bank, including East Jerusalem, as the reason for rocket attacks. A week later, on 21 November, Egypt brokered a ceasefire to the conflict which contained the following agreements:

1. Israel should stop all hostilities in the Gaza Strip land, sea and air, including incursions and targeting of individuals.
2. All Palestinian factions shall stop all hostilities from the Gaza Strip against Israel, including rocket attacks and all attacks along the border.
3. The crossings should be opened, facilitating the movement of people and goods; Israel should refrain from restricting residents' movements and from targeting residents in border areas; procedures of implementation should be dealt with 24 hours after the start of the ceasefire.

Gaza Strip: access and closure

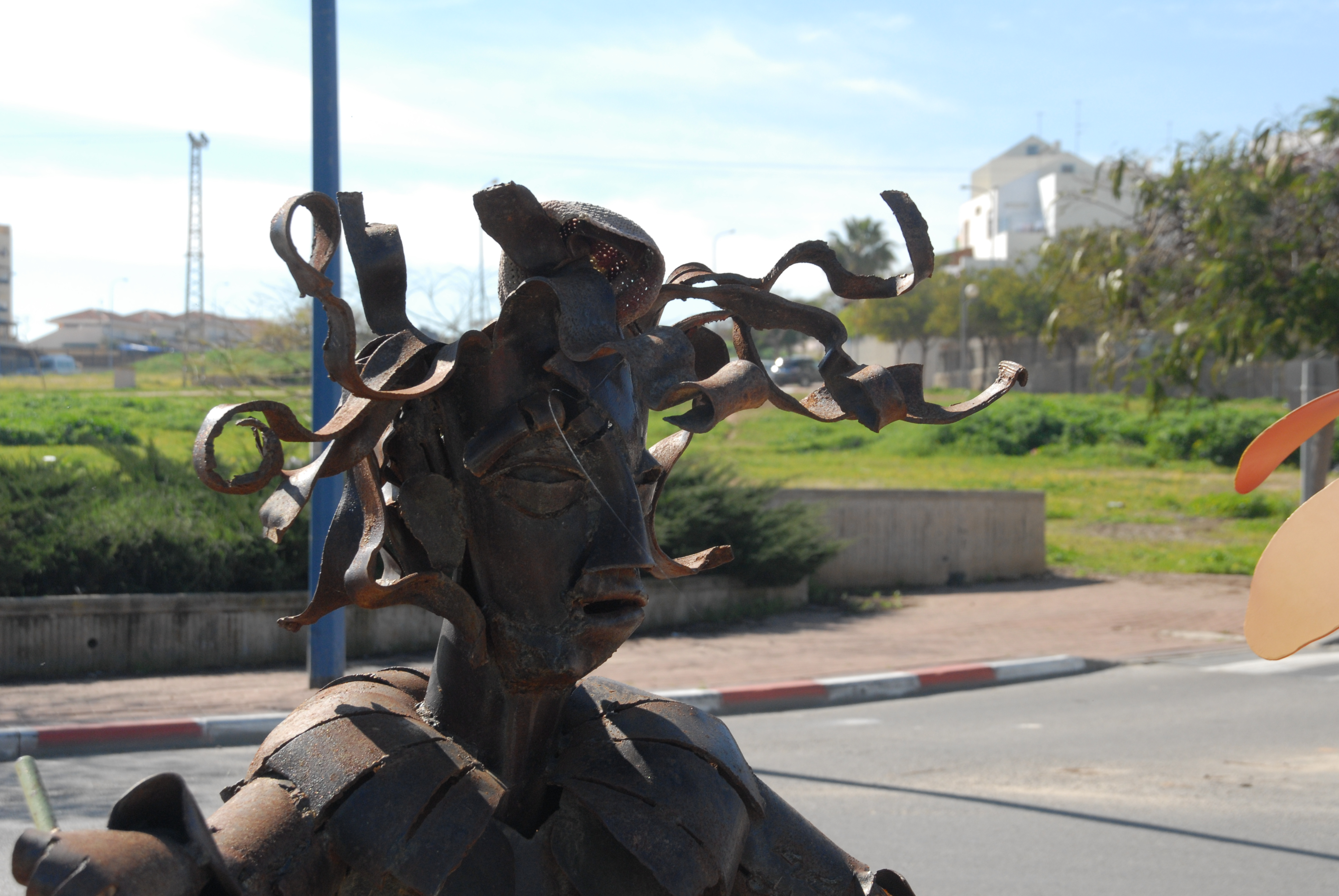
A sculpture in Sderot made from rocket debris

==== Violations ====
Both Israel and Hamas argue that the other violated the 2012 ceasefire agreement, resulting in 1 Israeli and 8 Gazan deaths and 5 Israeli and 66 Gazan injuries. According to the Israeli Security Agency (Shabak) there was a sharp decrease in attacks from Gaza in 2013. Nevertheless, 63 rockets (average 5 per month) were launched in 36 rocket attacks in addition to various mortar attacks, all prohibited by the November 2012 ceasefire. The Palestinian Centre for Human Rights (PCHR) reported monthly Israeli attacks involving drones, missiles, small arms fire and airstrikes. Six of the deaths in Gaza occurred in the border area's Access Restricted Areas (ARAs, non-demarcated zones within Gazan territory unilaterally defined by Israel as being of restricted access), despite the ceasefire's prohibition on Israeli attacks on these areas. OCHAO, more broadly sourced data, reported 11 deaths in Gaza and 81 injuries for 2013.

In the first three months after the IDF Operation Pillar of Defense, according to Ben White, two mortar shells struck Israeli territory, while four Gazans were shot dead and 91 were wounded by Israeli forces who fired inside Gazan territory on 63 occasions, made 13 incursions into the Strip, and attacked the Gazan fishing fleet 30 times. Israeli attacks on Gaza steadily increased during the second half of 2013, notwithstanding the decrease in attacks from Gaza.

From December 2012 to late June/early July 2014, Hamas did not fire rockets into Israel, and tried to police other groups doing so. These efforts were largely successful; Netanyahu stated in March 2014 that the rocket fire in the past year was the "lowest in a decade." According to Shabak, in the first half of 2014 there were 181 rocket attacks compared to 55 rocket attacks in whole 2013.

As occasional rocket fire continued, the blockade of Gaza continued in direct violation of the ceasefire agreement. "Crossings were repeatedly shut and buffer zones were reinstated. Imports declined, exports were blocked, and fewer Gazans were given exit permits to Israel and the West Bank."

Israel halted construction material going to Gaza after it stated that it had discovered a tunnel leading into Israel, some 300 m from a kibbutz. The IDF said it was the third tunnel discovered that year and that the previous two were packed with explosives.

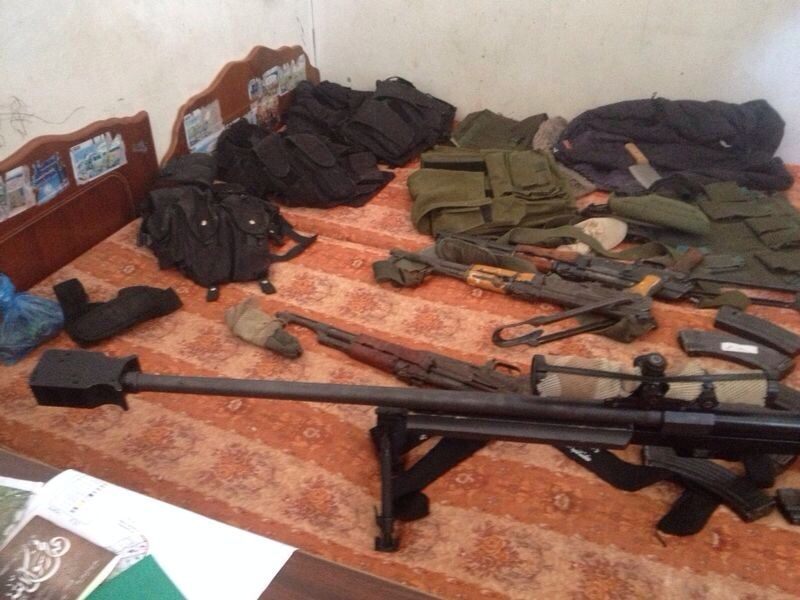
Some of the weapons captured in Khan Yunis

According to the Israeli Ministry of Foreign Affairs, there were 85 rocket attacks in the first five months of 2014. Most of the 85 rockets were fired in March, after the IDF killed 3 members of Islamic Jihad. The members of the PIJ say they were firing rockets in response to an incursion by Israeli tanks and bulldozers into Gazan territory east of the Khan Yunis area. The IDF said they were conducting routine military patrols near the Gaza border when they came under fire, and thus responded with airstrikes.

=== Second Hamas–Fatah reconciliation ===
Leading up to the collapse of the 2013–14 Israeli–Palestinian peace talks, in the face of Netanyahu's perceived reluctance to make desired concessions, Mahmoud Abbas decided to forge a deal with Hamas. With its alliance with Syria and Iran weakened, the loss of power by the Muslim Brotherhood in Egypt after a coup d'ètat in Egypt, and the economic impact of the closure of its Rafah tunnels by Abdel Fattah el-Sisi, on 23 April 2014, ending seven divisive years, Hamas agreed to reconciliation under a unity government with the other main Palestinian faction, Fatah. The government accepted by Hamas was to be run exclusively by PNA technocrats.

This Palestinian unity government was sworn in by 2 June 2014 and Israel announced it would not negotiate any peace deal with the new government and would push punitive measures. Netanyahu took Palestinian unity as a threat rather than an opportunity. On the eve of the agreement he stated that the proposed reconciliation would "strengthen terrorism", and called on the international community to avoid embracing it. Most of the outside world, including the European Union, Russia, China, India, Turkey, France and the United Kingdom, proved cautiously optimistic, and subsequently expressed their support for new arrangement. The United States, more skeptical, announced it would continue to work with the PNA-directed unity government. Israel itself suspended negotiations with the PNA and, just after the announcement, launched an airstrike, which missed its target and wounded a family of three bystanders. Netanyahu had warned before the deal that it would be incompatible with Israeli–Palestinian peace and that Abbas had to choose between peace with Hamas and peace with Israel. When a reconciliation deal was signed, opening the way to the appointment of the new government, Netanyahu chaired a security cabinet which voted to authorise Netanyahu to impose unspecified sanctions against the Palestinian Authority.

On 4 June, the day before Naksa Day, the Israeli Housing and Construction Ministry published tenders for 1,500 settlement units in the West Bank and East Jerusalem in a move Minister Uri Ariel said was an "appropriate Zionist response to the Palestinian terror government." Marwan Bishara, senior political analyst at Al Jazeera, alleged that Israel had hoped to disrupt the Palestinian national unity government between Fatah and Hamas by its operation.

=== Immediate events ===
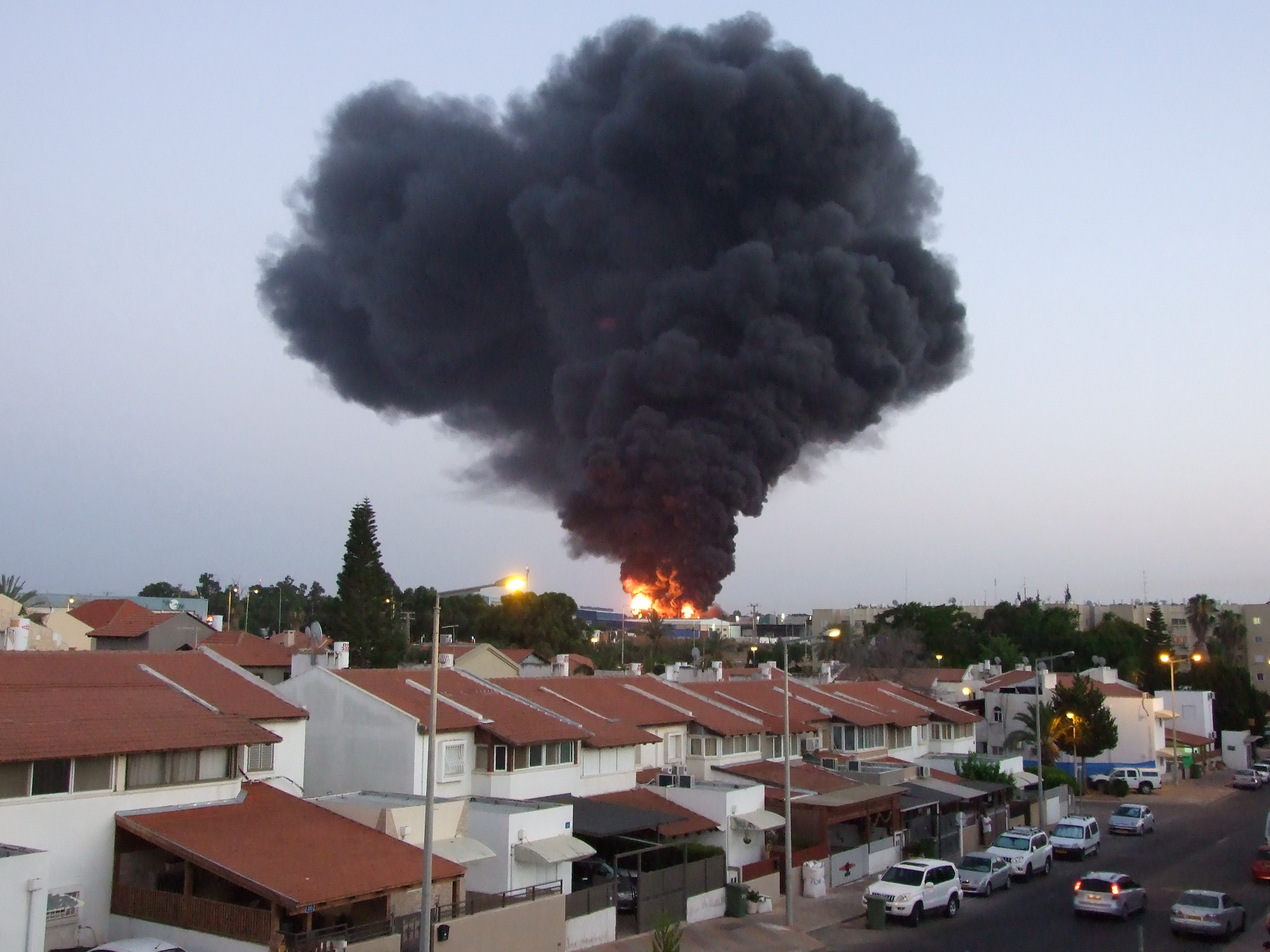
Factory bursts in flames after rocket attack in Sderot, Israel, 28 June 2014.

On 12 June 2014, three Israeli teenagers were abducted in the West Bank: Naftali Fraenkel, Gilad Shaer, and Eyal Yifrah. Israel blamed Hamas, with Israeli prime minister Benjamin Netanyahu saying that he had "unequivocal proof" that Hamas was involved and that the abduction was linked to Palestinian reconciliation, and the IDF stated that the two men Israel suspected of having kidnapped the teenagers were known members of Hamas. No evidence of Hamas involvement was offered by Israeli authorities at the time. High-ranking members of Hamas denied the group had any involvement in the incident, and ex-Shin Bet chief Yuval Diskin doubted Hamas had any involvement. The Palestinian Authority in the West Bank attributed the abductions to the Qawasameh clan, notorious for acting against Hamas's policies and any attempts to reach an entente with Israel. Hamas political chief Khaled Meshal said he could neither confirm nor deny the kidnapping of the three Israelis, but congratulated the abductors. The kidnappings were condemned by human rights organizations. Documents released by Israel suggest that Hamas member Hussam Qawasmeh organized the kidnappings with $60,000 provided by his brother Mahmoud through a Hamas association in Gaza, after requesting support for a "military operation". On 20 August, Saleh al-Arouri, an exiled Hamas leader based in Turkey, claimed responsibility for the kidnapping of the three Israeli teens: "Our goal was to ignite an intifada in the West Bank and Jerusalem, as well as within the 1948 borders... Your brothers in the Al-Qassam Brigades carried out this operation to support their imprisoned brothers, who were on a hunger strike... The mujahideen captured these settlers in order to have a swap deal." Palestinian security forces said the kidnappings were organized by Saleh al-Arouri. Khalid Meshaal, head in exile of Hamas's political wing since 2004, acknowledged that Hamas members were responsible, but stated that its political leaders had no prior knowledge of the abduction, were not involved in military details and learnt of it through the ensuing Israeli investigations. He also said that while Hamas was opposed to targeting civilians, he understood that Palestinians "frustrated with oppression" were exercising a "legitimate right of resistance" against the occupation by undertaking such operations. Israel states that the IDF and the Shin Bet have foiled between 54 and 64 kidnapping plots since 2013. The PA said it had foiled 43 of them.

Withholding evidence in its possession suggesting that the teens had been killed immediately until 1 July, Israel launched Operation Brother's Keeper, a large-scale crackdown of what it called Hamas's terrorist infrastructure and personnel in the West Bank, ostensibly aimed at securing the release of the kidnapped teenagers. During the operation, 11 Palestinians were killed and 51 wounded in 369 Israeli incursions into the West Bank through to 2 July, and between 350 and 600 Palestinians, including nearly all of Hamas's West Bank leaders, were arrested. Among those arrested were many people who had only recently been freed under the terms of the Gilad Shalit prisoner exchange. Israeli military spokesman Lt. Col. Peter Lerner defended the arrests, stating that Hamas members had carried out 60 abduction attempts on Israelis in the West Bank "in the last year and a half", and that "Hamas does not need to give a direct order." The arrests yielded no information about the abduction. Amnesty International and Human Rights Watch stated that certain aspects of the operation amounted to collective punishment, and B'tselem said in a press release that the actions have caused "disproportionate harm to the basic rights of Palestinians". During the course of the operation, Israel said it had uncovered a Hamas plot to launch a massive wave of violence throughout the West Bank, with the goal of overthrowing the Palestinian Authority. The purported coup plotters were arrested and their weapons stockpiles were seized.

On 30 June, search teams found the bodies of the three missing teenagers near Hebron. After their burial, an anti-Arab riot broke out, and a Palestinian teenager was murdered in revenge. His killing sparked Arab rioting. Israel police arrested six suspects belonging to the Beitar Jerusalem F.C. supporters' group La Familia and charged three of them with murder.

As part of its crackdown and concurrent to rocket fire from Gaza, Israel conducted air strikes against Hamas facilities in the Gaza Strip. Hamas apparently refrained from retaliating, though it did not impede other factions from firing rockets towards Israel. From 1 May to 11 June, six rockets and three mortar shells were launched from Gaza towards Israel. From 12 to 30 June 44 rockets and 3 mortar shells were launched from Gaza. On 29 June, an Israeli airstrike on a rocket crew killed a Hamas operative, while at least 18 rockets were launched from Gaza through the next day by Hamas according to both J.J. Goldberg and Assaf Sharon, with Goldberg stating that it was the first time Hamas directly launched rockets since the conflict in 2012. Overnight, on 30 June – 1 July, Israeli airstrikes struck 34 Gaza targets in what officials stated was a response to the Sunday rocketry, while Stuart Greer reported the strikes were revenge for the deaths of the three youths. From the day of the abductions on 12 June through 5 July 117 rockets were launched from Gaza and there were approximately 80 Israeli airstrikes on Gaza.

Israel sought a ceasefire but refused to accept Hamas's condition that Palestinians arrested in the West Bank crackdown be released. In a meeting held on 2 July to discuss the crisis, Hamas reportedly tried but failed to persuade armed factions in Gaza to uphold the truce with Israel. Following escalating rocket fire from Gaza, Israel issued a warning on 4 July that it "would only be able to sustain militant rocket fire for another 24, or maximum 48, hours before undertaking a major military offensive." Hamas declared it was prepared to halt the rocket fire in exchange for an agreement by Israel to stop airstrikes. Netanyahu said Israel would only act against further rocket attacks. On 5 July, Hamas official Osama Hamdan said rocket fire would continue until Israel lifted its import restrictions on Gaza and the Palestinian Authority transferred money to pay Hamas civil servants. Between 4 and 6 July, a total of 62 rockets were fired from Gaza and the IAF attacked several targets in Gaza. The following day, Hamas assumed formal responsibility for launching rocket attacks on Israel. Hamas increased rocket attacks on Israel, and by 7 July had fired 100 rockets from Gaza at Israeli territory; at the same time, the Israeli Air Force had bombed several sites in Gaza. Early on 8 July, the IAF bombed 50 targets in the Gaza Strip. Israel's military also stopped a militant infiltration from the sea. Brigadier General Moti Almoz, the chief spokesman of the Israeli military, said: "We have been instructed by the political echelon to hit Hamas hard." Hamas insisted that Israel end all attacks on Gaza, release those re-arrested during the crackdown in the West Bank, lift the blockade on Gaza and return to the cease-fire conditions of 2012 as conditions for a ceasefire.

== Operation timeline ==
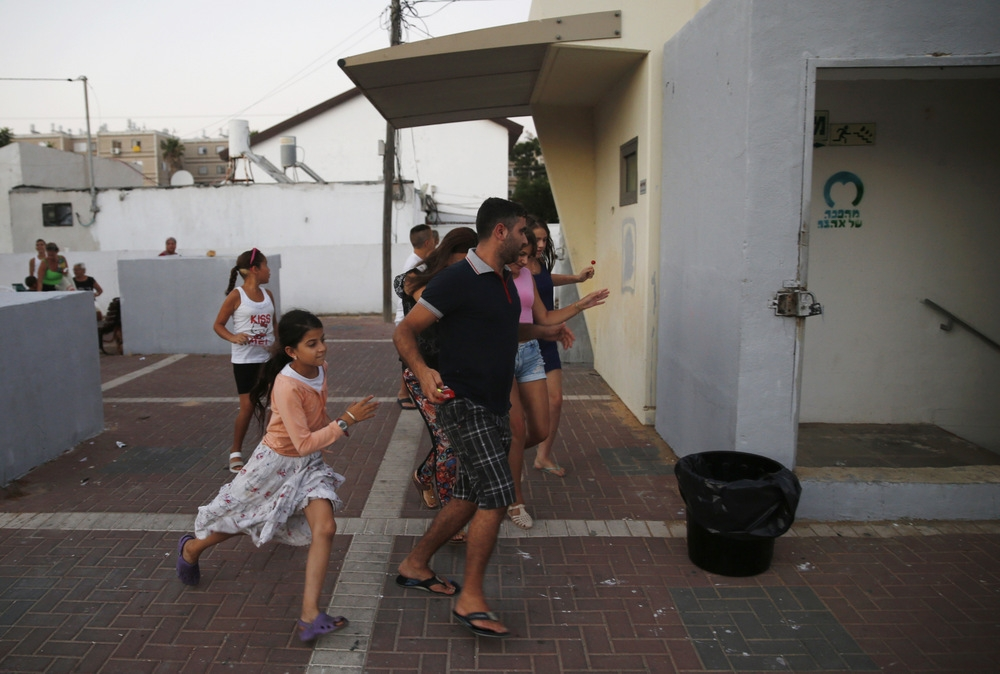
Israeli residents of Ashkelon run for shelter during a rocket alert

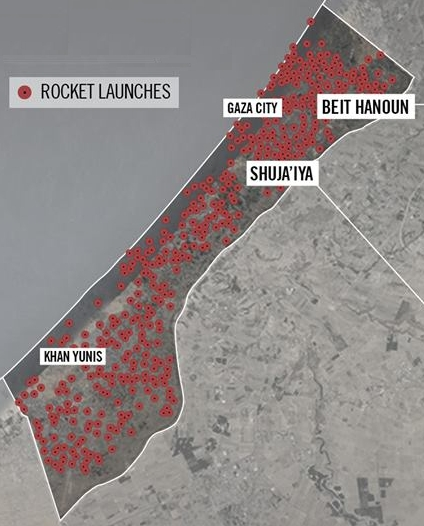
IDF-released map of rocket launch sites in Gaza

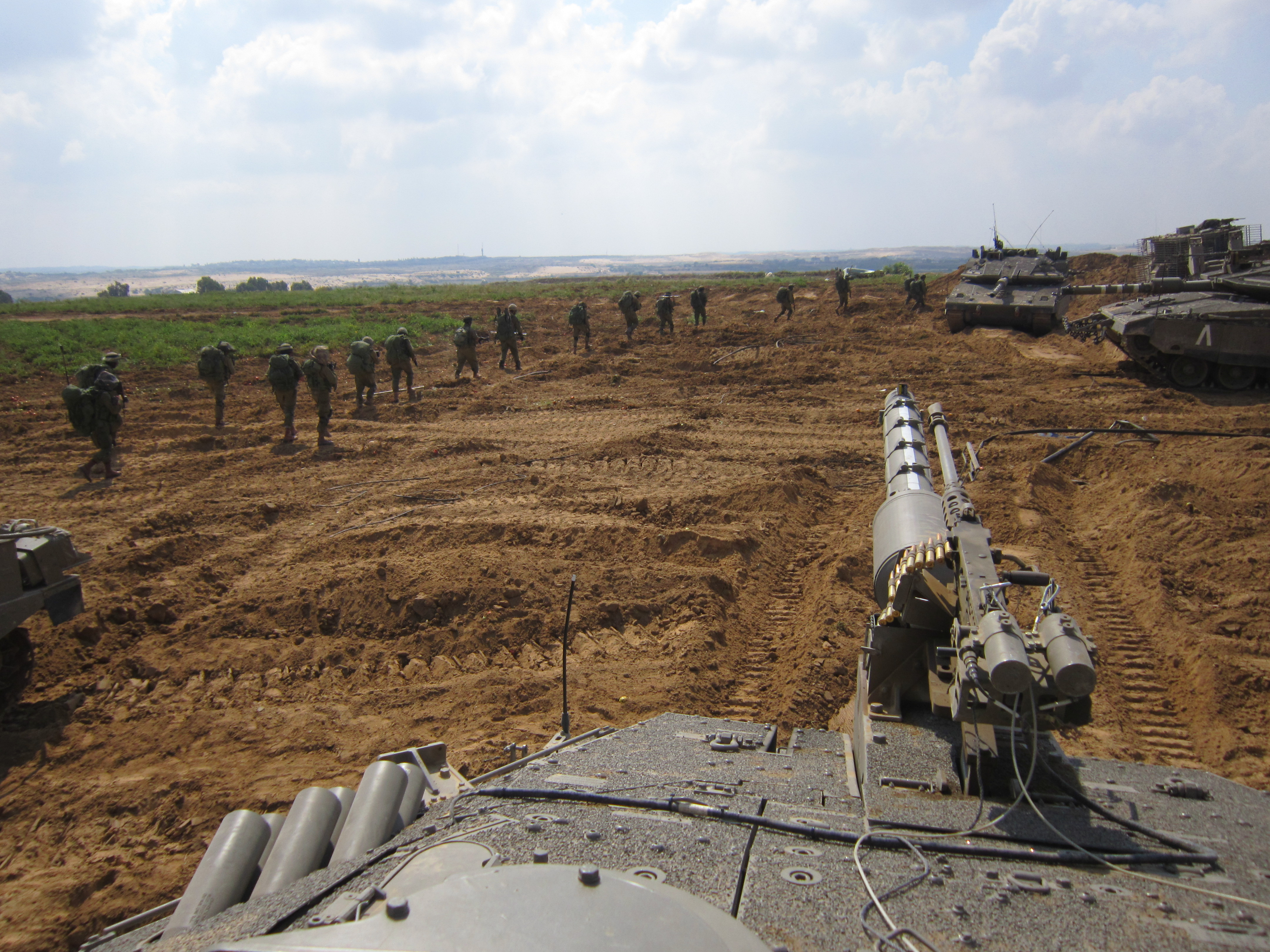
Israeli troops and tanks near the Gaza border

=== Phase 1: Air strikes ===
As the Israeli operation began, and the IDF bombarded targets in the Gaza Strip with artillery and airstrikes, Hamas continued to fire rockets and mortar shells into Israel in response. A cease-fire proposal was announced by the Egyptian government on 14 July, backed by Palestinian president Mahmoud Abbas; the Israeli government accepted it and temporarily stopped hostilities on the morning of 15 July, but Hamas rejected it in "its current form", citing the fact Hamas has not been consulted in the formation of the ceasefire and it omitted many of their demands. By 16 July, the death toll within Gaza had surpassed 200 people.

=== Phase 2: Ground invasion ===
On 16 July, Hamas and Islamic Jihad offered the Israeli government a 10-year truce with ten conditions centred on the lifting of the blockade and the release of prisoners who were released in the Gilad Shalit prisoner swap and were re-arrested; it was not accepted. On 17 July, a five-hour humanitarian ceasefire, proposed by the UN, took place. Approximately five and a half hours prior to the ceasefire's effect, the IDF sighted 13 armed Hamas militants emerging from a Gazan tunnel on the Israeli side of the Gaza border. IDF destroyed the tunnel's exit, ending the incursion. After the ceasefire, IDF began a ground offensive on the Gaza Strip focused on destroying tunnels crossing the Israel border. On 20 July, the Israeli military entered Shuja'iyya, a populous neighborhood of Gaza City, resulting in heavy fighting.

On 24 July, over 10,000 Palestinians in the West Bank protested against the Israeli operation; 2 Palestinian protesters were killed. 150 Hamas militants who surrendered to the IDF were being questioned about Hamas operations. On 25 July, an Israeli airstrike killed Salah Abu Hassanein, the leader of Islamic Jihad's military wing. On 26 July, another humanitarian ceasefire took place for twelve hours, followed by a unilateral extension by Israel for another twenty-four hours, which was rejected by Hamas. The Palestinian death toll in the Gaza Strip topped 1,000.

On 1 August, the US and UN announced that Israel and Hamas had agreed to a 72-hour ceasefire starting at 08:00. There was dispute about the terms of the ceasefire: Israel and the US stated that they allowed Israel to "continue to do operations to destroy tunnels that pose a threat to Israeli territory that lead from the Gaza Strip into Israel proper as long as those tunnels exist on the Israel side of their lines"; Hamas said that it would not accept such a condition. The ceasefire broke down almost immediately after it started. Israel blamed Hamas for violating the ceasefire, saying a group of Israeli soldiers were attacked by Palestinian militants emerging from a tunnel. Palestinians said the IDF was the first to breach the ceasefire when at 08:30 it destroyed 19 buildings while undertaking work to demolish tunnels. According to the PLO, the Palestinian Authority and Gazan sources, Hamas attacked an Israeli unit, killing an Israeli officer (Hadar Goldin, who was initially thought to have been captured) while Israeli forces were still engaged in military activities in Rafah on Gaza's territory before the truce came into effect. Tweets reported the battle in Rafah before the deadline for the cease-fire. Hamas also killed two soldiers in a suicide bombing attack. Senior Hamas leader Moussa Abu Marzouk accused Israel of creating pretexts to undermine the Gaza ceasefire and said that Palestinian fighters abducted the officer and killed the two soldiers before the start of the humanitarian truce, which a Hamas witness has stated began at 7:30 and lasted five minutes, while Israel said the event took place at 09:20, after the 08:00 start of the ceasefire.

=== Phase 3: Withdrawal of Israeli troops ===
On 3 August, IDF pulled most of its ground forces out of the Gaza Strip after completing the destruction of 32 tunnels built by Hamas and other militants. On 5 August, Israel announced that it had arrested Hossam Kawasmeh on 11 July, and suspected him of having organized the killing of the three teenagers. According to court documents, Kawasmeh stated that Hamas members in Gaza financed the recruitment and arming of the killers.

On 10 August, another Egyptian proposal for a 72-hour ceasefire was negotiated and agreed upon Israeli and Palestinian officials, and on 13 August it was extended for another 120 hours to allow both sides to continue negotiations for a long-term solution to end the month-long fighting. On 19 August, a 24-hour ceasefire extension renewal was violated just hours after agreement with 29 Hamas rockets fired in 20 minutes, with IAF airstrikes in response, killing 9 Gazans. The Israeli delegation was ordered home from Cairo.

On 21 August, an Israeli airstrike in Rafah killed three of Hamas's top commanders: Mohammed Abu Shammala, Raed al Atar and Mohammed Barhoum. During the period from 22 to 26 August, over 700 rockets and mortar shells fired into Israel, killing 3 Israelis. On 26 August, Israel and Hamas accepted another cease-fire at 19:00.

=== Result and post-conflict events ===
On 16 September, a mortar shell was fired to Israel for the first time since the cease-fire commenced. Defense Minister Moshe Ya'alon reassured border town populations that fighting would not resume with the Gaza Strip at the end of this month, the same time of year as the Jewish new year.

According to Palestinians on 1 October, Israeli forces entered the Gaza Strip and fired upon Palestinian farmers and farms. No injuries were reported.

IDF reported that on 31 October a rocket or a mortar shell was launched from Gaza into southern Israel without causing harm.

On 23 November, a Palestinian farmer was shot dead in Gaza, marking the first time a Palestinian from Gaza had been killed by Israeli fire since the seven-week war between Israel and Hamas militants ended with an Egyptian-brokered ceasefire on 26 August. The Israeli army said two Palestinians had approached the border fence and had ignored calls to halt, prompting troops to fire warning shots in the air. "Once they didn't comply, they fired towards their lower extremities. There was one hit," a spokeswoman said.

== Impact ==
=== On Gaza residents ===
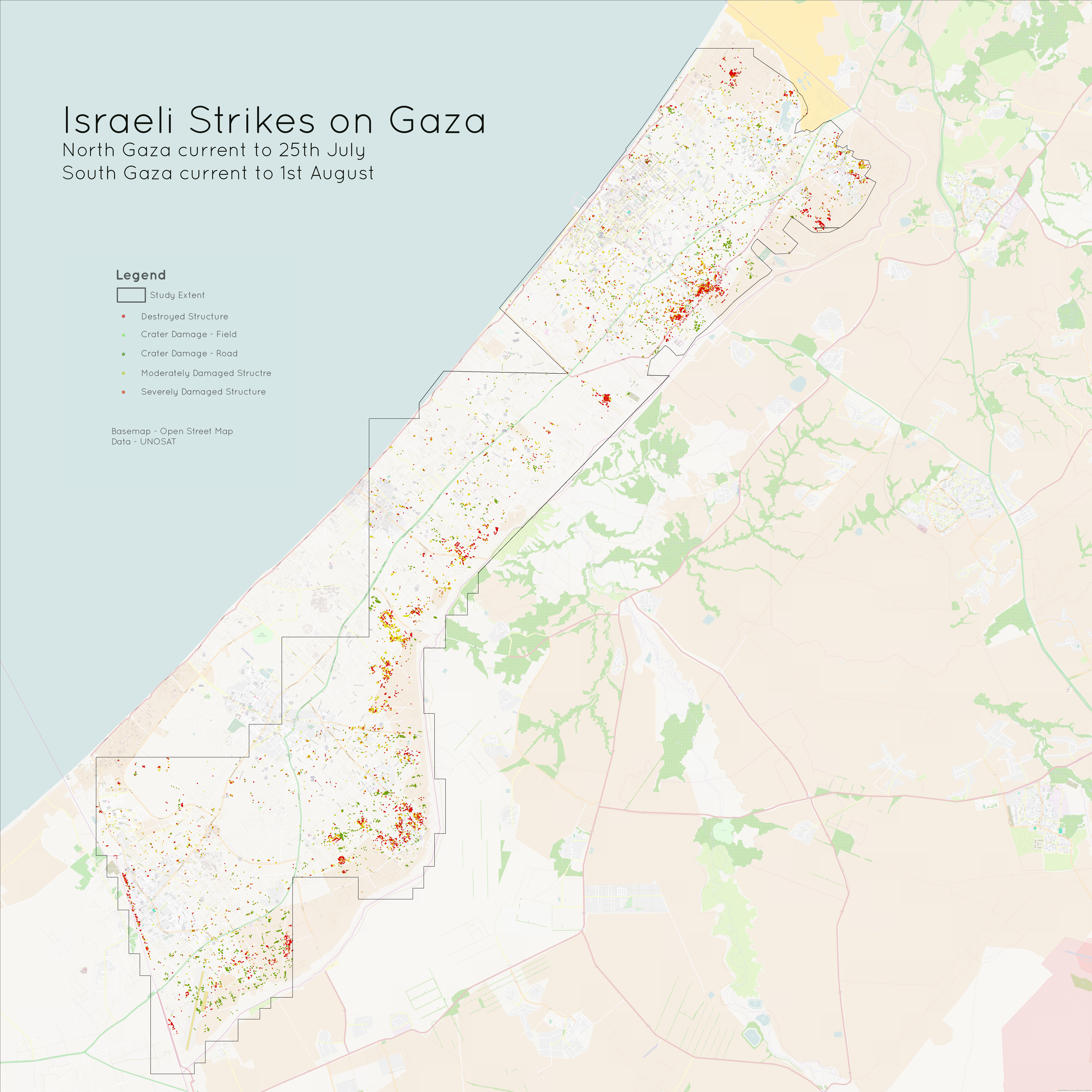
A map showing the location of damage in Gaza up to 25 July for northern Gaza and 1 August for southern Gaza

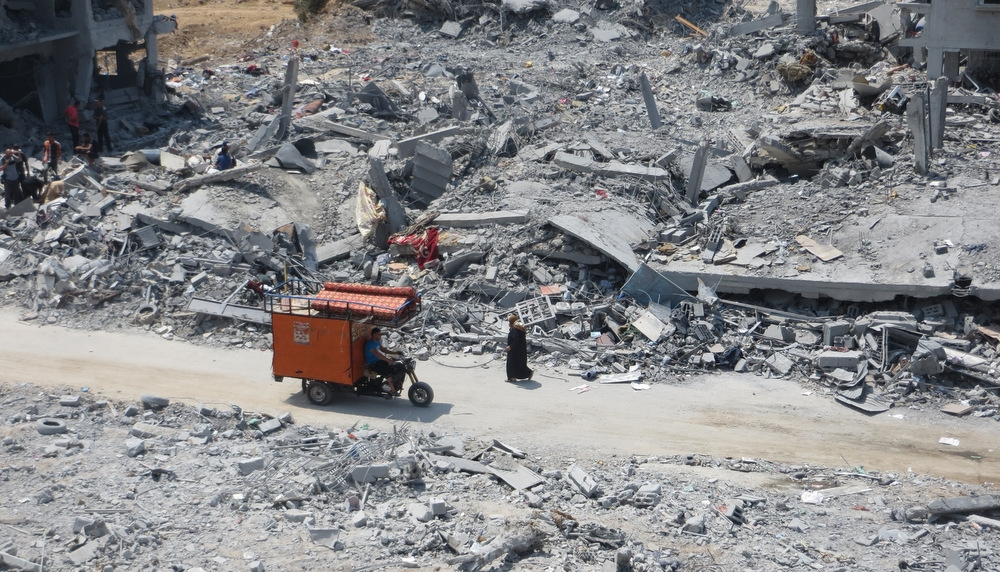
Ruins of buildings in Beit Hanoun, August 2014

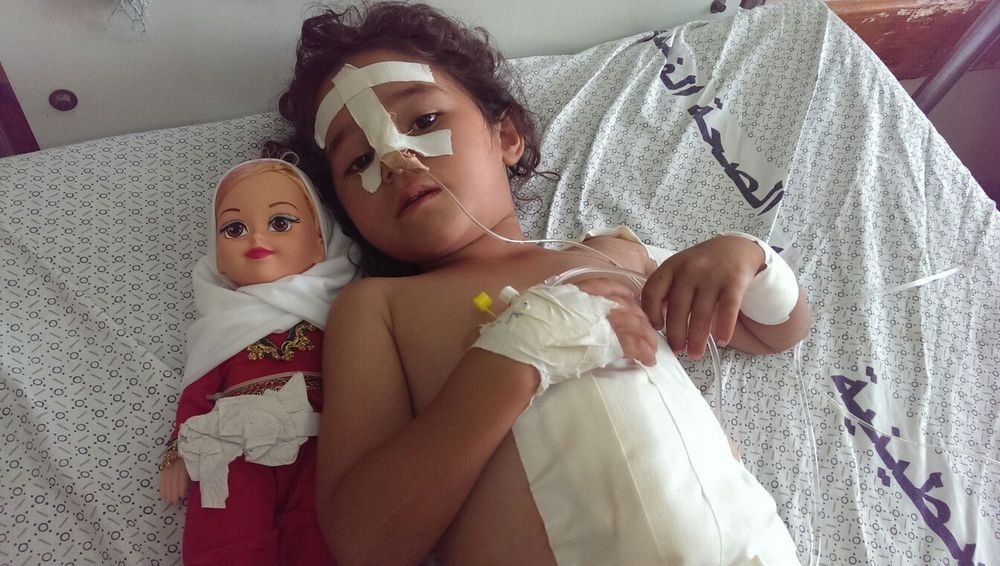
Five-year-old Shaymaa al-Masri was injured on 9 July 2014.

As of 20 July 2014, hospitals in Gaza were ill-equipped and faced severe shortages of various kinds of medicine, medical supplies, and fuel. In response, Israel set up an IDF field hospital for Gazans at the Erez Crossing and Egypt temporarily reopened the Rafah crossing with Gaza to allow medical supplies to enter and injured Palestinians to receive treatment in Egypt. Due to the operation, prices of food, including fish and produce, rose dramatically. A 21 July news report stated that over 83,000 Palestinians had taken shelter in UN facilities. Fatah officials accused Hamas of mishandling humanitarian aid meant for civilians. According to them, Hamas took the aid, which included clothing, mattresses, medicine, water, and food, and distributed it among Hamas members or sold it on the black market for profit.

According to the United Nations Office for the Coordination of Humanitarian Affairs (OCHA), over 273,000 Palestinians in the Gaza Strip had been displaced as of 31 July 2014, of whom 236,375 (over eleven percent of the Gazan population) were taking shelter in 88 UNRWA schools. UNRWA exhausted its capacity to absorb displaced persons, and overcrowding in shelters risked the outbreak of epidemics. 1.8 million people were affected by a halt or reduction of the water supply, 138 schools and 26 health facilities were damaged, 872 homes were totally destroyed or severely damaged, and the homes of 5,005 families were damaged but still inhabitable. Throughout the Gaza Strip, people received only 2 hours of electricity per day. Power outage had an immediate effect on the public health situation and reduced water and sanitation services, with hospitals becoming dependent on generators. On 2 September, UNRWA reported that 58,217 people were sheltering in 31 of their school buildings, a fifth of their buildings.

OCHA estimated that at least 373,000 children required psychosocial support. "Intense overcrowding, compounded by the limited access of humanitarian staff to certain areas, is increasingly undermining the living conditions at many shelters and raising protection concerns. Water supply has been particularly challenging..." More than 485,000 internally displaced persons were in need of emergency food assistance.

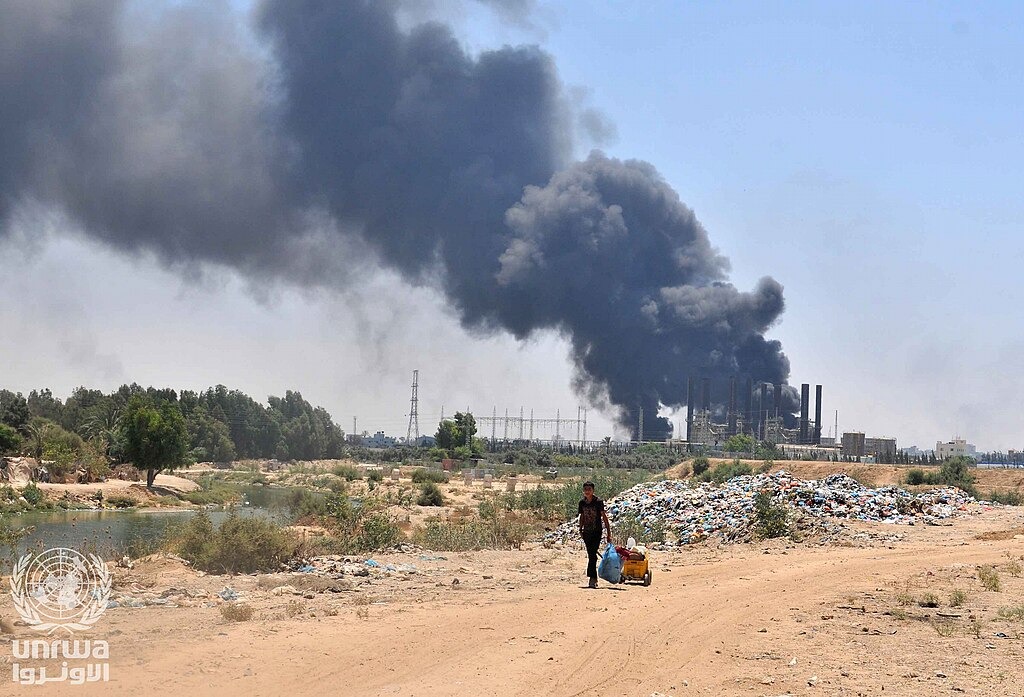
The Gaza Power Plant after it was attacked by the Israeli army on 29 July 2014.

Gaza City, home to 500,000, suffered damage to 20–25% of its housing. Beit Hanoun, with 70% of its housing stock damaged, is considered uninhabitable, with 30,000 residents there in need of accommodation. The only power station in the Strip was damaged on 29 July, and the infrastructure of power transmission lines and sewage pumps was severely damaged, with a major sewage pipe catering to 500,000 badly damaged. Among the infrastructure targeted and destroyed by Israel's bombing campaign were 220 factories in various industrial zones, including a major carpentry enterprise, construction companies, a major biscuit factory, dairy farms and livestock, a candy manufacturer, the orange groves of Beit Hanoun, Gaza's largest mosques, and several TV stations. Farms, as a consequence of damage or the presence of unexploded ordnance dropped during the conflict, are often inaccessible, and the damage to agriculture was estimated at over $200 million. 10 out of 26 hospitals closed.

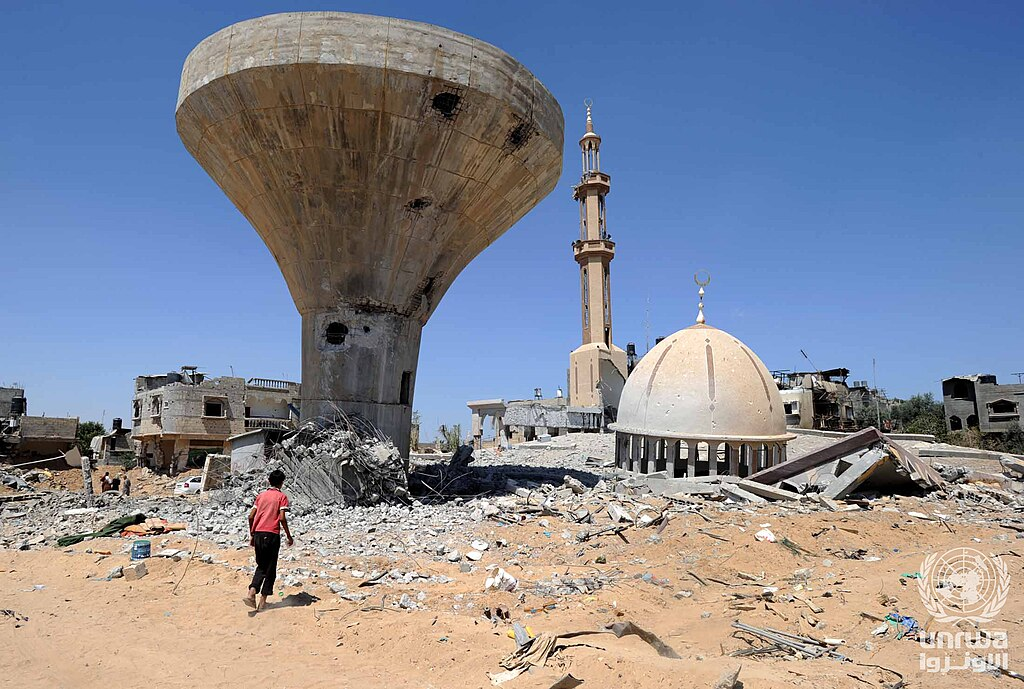
The mosque in Khuzaʽa was amongst those destroyed in the war.

According to the Palestinian Ministry of Endowments and Religious Affairs, 203 mosques were damaged during the war, with 73 being destroyed completely. Two of Gaza's three Christian churches were also damaged, with the third suffering some damage to peripheral buildings owned by the parish. In light of damage to mosques, Manuel Musallam informed Muslims they could call their prayers from Christian churches. Some of the mosques were described as "historic"; one was 700 years old and another 500 years old. Israel maintained that Hamas had a routine military use of mosques and that made them legitimate military targets. According to the IDF, 160 rockets were launched from mosques during the war. It also stated that mosques were used for weapon storage, tunnel entrances, training and gathering of militants. In one Associated Press report, residents denied that mosques damaged by Israeli forces had been used for military purposes. Cultural heritage sites were also damaged, including Tell es-Sakan, Tell Umm el-'Amr, and the Byzantine Church of Jabalia.

The UN calculated that more than 7,000 homes for 10,000 families were razed, together with an additional 89,000 homes damaged, of which roughly 10,000 were severely affected by the bombing. Rebuilding costs were calculated to run from 4–6 billion dollars, over 20 years.

=== On Israeli residents ===
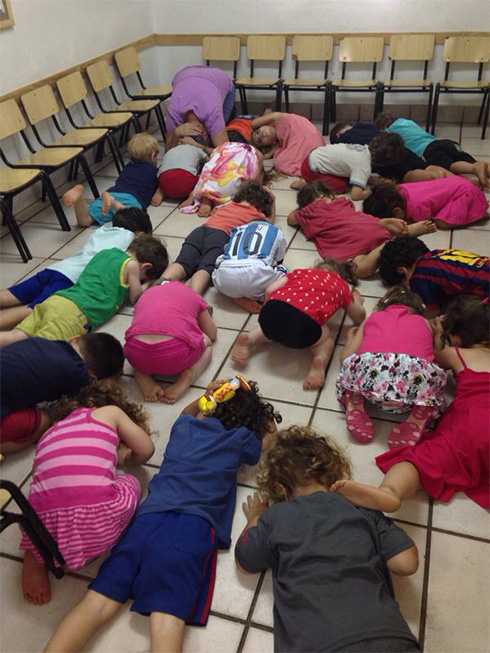
A kindergarten in central Israel during a rocket attack

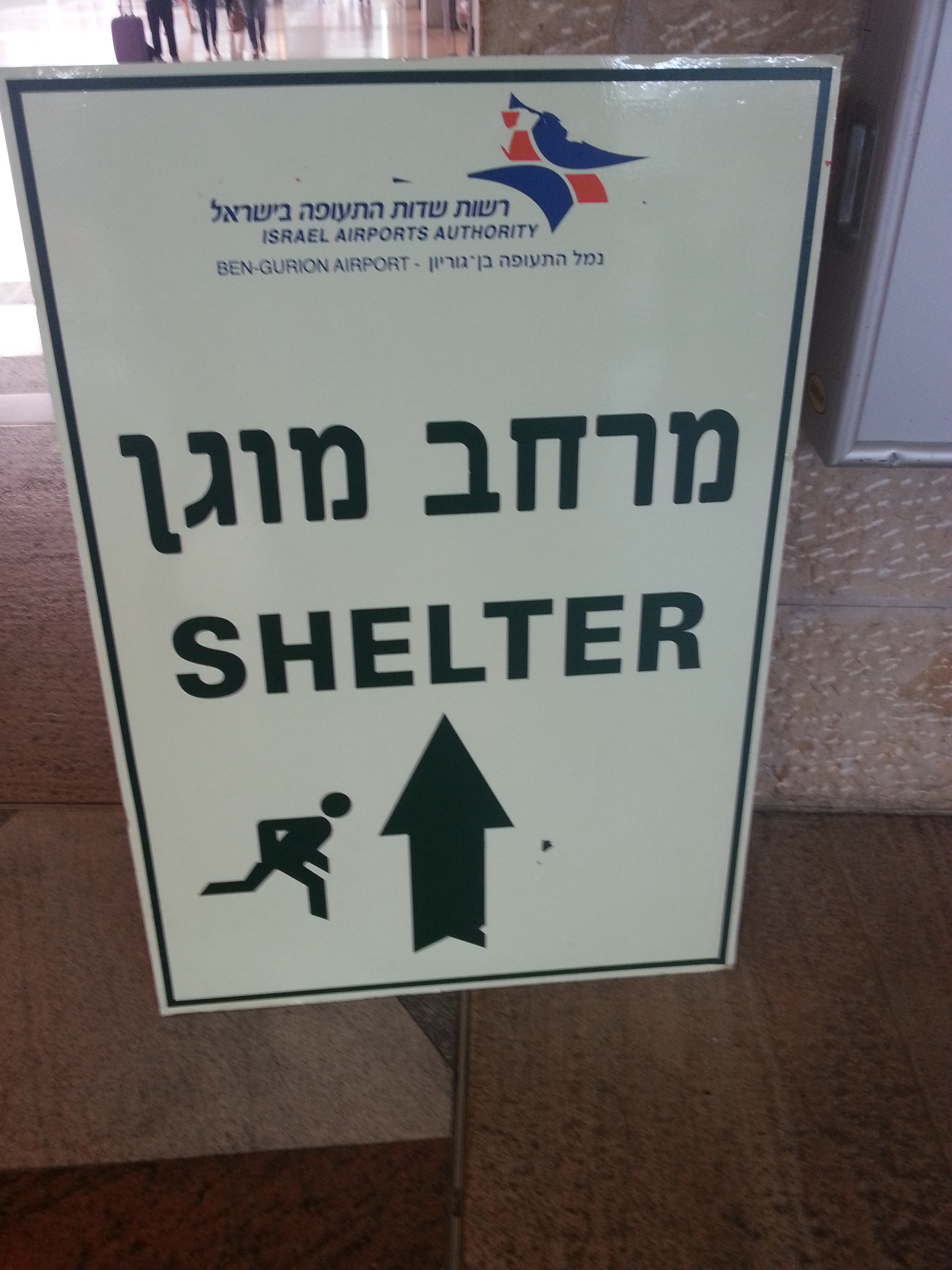
One of the shelter signs that were placed in the Ben Gurion Airport because of the rocket attacks on Israel

Hamas and other Islamist groups in Gaza fired rockets and mortars at Israeli towns and villages. Despite Israel's use of the Iron Dome missile defense systems, six civilians were killed, including an Arab Israeli and a Thai civilian worker. An Israeli teen was seriously injured in a rocket strike in the city of Ashkelon. Medical health professionals have noted that Israeli teens prone to mental health problems suffer increasingly during both short-term and long-term conflicts. Experts have identified a number of mental health symptoms which rise during conflict, including anxiety, depression, obsessive-compulsive disorder, interpersonal sensitivity, phobias, and paranoia. There is some doubt whether these issues will dissipate after the conflict is resolved.

Rocket attacks from Gaza caused damage to Israeli civilian infrastructure, including factories, gas stations, and homes.

At the onset of the operation, the Israeli government cancelled all programs within 40 km (25 mi) of Gaza, and requested all people stay at home or near shelter. All summer camps were closed and universities cancelled their final exams. Additionally, all gatherings of 300 or more people were banned. Due to the trajectory of rocket fire from Gaza, many flights in and out of Ben-Gurion Airport were delayed or rerouted. and flights to Ben-Gurion airport were interrupted for some days after a Hamas rocket struck an area in its vicinity. Hamas called the FAA flight ban a "great victory". Michael Ross wrote that the decision was driven by anxiety and caused considerably more damage than the potential danger it prevented.

About 4,600 claims for direct damage and 28,000 for indirect damage such as missed work days were submitted to Israel's Tax Authority, which paid ₪133 million for direct damage and ₪1.51 billion for indirect damage.

The Bedouin communities in the Negev, living in many habitations built illegally and unrecognised by the Israeli government, were classified as "open areas" and so their 200,000 residents did not have warning sirens or anti-rocket protection.

In Israel, an estimated 5,000 to 8,000 citizens temporarily fled their homes due to the threat of rocketry from Gaza. The economic cost of the operation is estimated at NIS 8.5 billion (approximately US$2.5 billion) and GDP loss of 0.4%. At the conclusion of hostilities 3,000–3,700 claims for damages had been submitted by Israelis, and $41 million paid out for property damage and missed work days. Reconstruction costs were estimated at $11 million.

== Casualties and losses ==
Most sources agreed that 2,200 Palestinians were killed, 65–70% of them civilians. Israel stated that 72 of its citizens were killed, of whom 67 were soldiers. +972 magazine pointed out that in this war, just like in other Gaza wars, the casualties were disproportionately Palestinian.

=== Palestinian ===
According to the main estimates between 2,125 and 2,310 Gazans were killed and between 10,626 and 10,895 were wounded (including 3,374 children, of whom over 1,000 were left permanently disabled). An estimated 64–70% of Palestinians killed were civilians. These estimates were made by the Gaza Health Ministry, the Israeli organization B'Tselem, two United Nations organs (the UNHRC and the OCHA) and the Palestinian Center for Human Rights. Israeli officials estimated that around 40–50% of those killed were militants. On 5 August, OCHA stated that 520,000 Palestinians in the Gaza Strip (approximately 30% of its population) might have been displaced, of whom 485,000 needed emergency food assistance and 273,000 were taking shelter in 90 UN-run schools.

Source	Total killed	Civilians				Combatants	Unknown	Percent civilians (among known)	Last updated	Methodology
Source	Total killed	Total	Children	Adult women	Elderly	Combatants	Unknown	Percent civilians (among known)		
Gaza Health Ministry	2,145	≈1,501	578	263	102	≈644	—	~70%	27 August 2014	Incomplete count
B'Tselem	2,203	1,371	527 (Note: B'Tselem reported fatalities of 180 children 0-5 years old and 347 children 6-17 years old.)	247 (Note: Women over 18 and under 60)	112 (Note: B'Tselem includes men and women over 60 in the "elderly" category)	785	47	64%		A detailed list containing the name, age, gender of every person killed, including the circumstances in which they were killed and who killed them (when known).
UN HRC	2,251	1,462	551	299		789	—	65%	22 June 2015	Fatalities compiled from media reports and then cross-checked with Palestinian, Israeli and international organizations. Data released by Gaza Health Ministry, the IDF and Hamas are all consulted.
OCHA	2,220	1,492	551	299		605	123	71%	March 2015	
Israeli MFA	2,125	761				936	428	36%	14 June 2015	Uses its own intelligence reports as well as Palestinian sources and media reports to determine combatant deaths.
Palestinian Centre for Human Rights	2,216	1,543	556	293		673		69%	3 June 2015	Includes information collected via interviews with eyewitnesses of the event and family of the victim

The UN and other organizations classified fatalities as civilians based on eyewitness accounts, interviews with family members and contacts with other field researchers. Israeli government said its figures were based on "intelligence", but did not provide any further details or evidence. The Israeli group ITIC provided details for its casualty count, but only for the first 152 casualties (7% of total dead), and stated that 47% killed were militants. The New York Times noted that the proportion of deaths that were female rose later in the war. Israeli sources claim that Palestinian militants try to "conceal" their dead; however, a New Zealander source said Palestinian armed groups claim their dead and hold "big funerals" for them, as that martyrdom is a matter of pride for them. Another question revolved around who is a combatant. Israeli sources tend to classify civilian employees of Hamas (such as those employed by various government ministries or political offices) as "terrorists". However, Human Rights Watch criticizes this practice as contrary to International Humanitarian Law and cautions that civilian employees of Hamas can't be targeted.

The IDF captured the bodies of 19 Hamas fighters killed during the war. Israel continues to hold the bodies pending a prisoner exchange deal.

Human rights groups and the UN use the Gaza Health Ministry's number of Palestinians killed in Gaza as preliminary and add to or subtract from it after conducting their own investigations. For example, human rights groups say that the casualty count provided by the Health Ministry most likely includes victims of Hamas executions, domestic violence, and natural deaths, but they (the human rights groups) remove the accused collaborators (who were shot as close range) from their own counts. Israel contends that the Health Ministry's casualty count also includes deaths caused by rocket or mortar malfunctions.

According to the OCHA 2015 overview, of the 2,220 Palestinians killed in the conflict, 742 fatalities came from 142 families, who suffered the loss of 3 or more family members in individual bombing incidents on residential buildings. According to data provided by the Palestinian International Middle East Media Center, 79.7% of the Palestinians killed in Gaza were male, with the majority between 16 and 35. In contrast, a New York Times analysis states that males of ages that are most likely to be militants form 9% of the population but 34% of the casualties, while women and children under 15, who are least likely to be legitimate targets, form 71% of the general population and 33% of the casualties. Israel has pointed to the relatively small numbers of fatalities among women, children and men over 60, and to instances of Hamas fighters being counted as civilians (perhaps due to the broad definition of "civilian" used by the Gaza Health Ministry), to support its view that the number of the dead who were militants is 40–50%. The IDF calculates that 5% of Gaza's military forces were killed in the war. Jana Krause, from the war studies department at King's College London, stated that "a potential explanation other than combatant roles" for the tendency of the dead to be young men "could be that families expect them to be the first ones to leave shelters in order to care for hurt relatives, gather information, look after abandoned family homes or arrange food and water."

Abbas said that "over 850 Hamas members and their families" were killed by Israel during the operation. During the fighting between Israel and Gaza, solidarity protests occurred in the West Bank, during which several Palestinians died; see Reactions.

=== Israeli ===
A total of 67 IDF soldiers were killed, including one who died of his injuries after two and a half years in a coma, two soldiers – Staff Sergeant Oron Shaul and Second Lieutenant Hadar Goldin – whose bodies are believed to be held in Gaza, and an off-duty soldier who was killed in a rocket attack near his hometown while on leave from service in the war. Another 469 soldiers were injured. The IDF said that 5 soldiers were killed and 23 were wounded by friendly fire.

Eleven soldiers were killed, and scores were wounded, in three separate Hamas tunnel attacks on IDF units inside Israel. No Israeli civilian casualties were reported in these attacks.

Nine IDF soldiers and six civilians were killed in Israel by Palestinian rocket and mortar fire. That means that 64 percent of the victims of Hamas rocket and mortar attacks were IDF soldiers.

According to Magen David Adom, 837 civilians were treated for shock (581) or injuries (256): 36 were injured by shrapnel, 33 by debris from shattered glass and building debris, 18 in traffic accidents which occurred when warning sirens sounded, 159 from falling or trauma while on the way to shelters, and 9 in violence in Jerusalem and Maale Adumim.

The first Israeli civilian death occurred at the Erez Checkpoint, where a Chabad rabbi was killed by mortar fire. He had come from the West Bank settlement of Bet Arye to deliver food and drinks to IDF soldiers on the front line.

The second Israeli civilian to be killed was Awda Lafi al-Waj, a 32-year-old Israeli Bedouin, who was hit by a rocket in the Bedouin village of Qasr al-Sir, near Dimona. In spite of having been recognized as a regular settlement in 1999, the village was still not hooked up to the national electricity grid. The rocket alarm system therefore was not operative in the village. The village had still not an approved master plan, which meant that all construction was illegal. There were no shelters, safe rooms or protective walls in the village. The area where the village was located was considered "open area" by military authorities and was therefore not defended by the Iron Dome air defense system.

A Thai migrant worker was also killed by mortar fire while working at a greenhouse in moshav Netiv HaAsara, located a few hundred meters from the Gaza border. The IDF had previously converted the car park in the southern part of the village into an army base and placed tanks there. The moshav provided no protection for the migrant workers working in the fields or greenhouses, located too far from the shelters.

On 22 August, a 4-year-old Israeli child was killed by a mortar that fell on kibbutz Nahal Oz.

Two Israeli civilians in kibbutz Nirim were killed in a barrage of mortar fire, an hour before a ceasefire went into effect. The two were the settlement's chief and deputy military security co-ordinators. Both Nahal Oz and Nirim (as well as two other nearby settlements) were used as staging areas for IDF tanks operating inside Gaza. The settlements were used for envelopment, surveillance and military supply. Eyal Weizman commented that "Israel claims that Hamas is endangering its civilian population by locating its installations in inhabited areas... Israel does the same, though it has enough space to choose not to."

=== Economic impact ===
Palestinian officials estimated on 4 September that, with 17,000 homes destroyed by Israeli bombing, the reconstruction would cost $7.8 billion, which is about three times Gaza's GDP for 2011. Gaza City suffered damage to 20–25% of its housing and Beit Hanoun with 70% of its housing uninhabitable. The New York Times noted that damage in this third war was more severe than in the two preceding wars, where in the aftermath of the earlier Operation Cast Lead the damage inflicted was $4 billion, 3 times the then GDP of Gaza's economy. Strikes on Gaza's few industries will take years to repair. Gaza's main power plant on Salaheddin Road was damaged. Two sewage pumping stations in Zeitoun were damaged. The biggest private company in Gaza, the Alawda biscuit and ice cream factory, employing 400, was destroyed by a shelling barrage on 31 July, a few days after undertaking to supply its Choco Sandwich biscuits to 250,000 refugees in response to a request from the World Food Programme; other strikes targeted a plastics factory, a sponge-making plant, the offices of Gaza's main fruit distribution network, the El Majd Industrial and Trading Corporation's factory for cardboard box, carton and plastic bag production, Gaza's biggest dairy product importer and distributor, Roward International. Trond Husby, chief of the UN's Gaza development programme in Gaza, commented that the level of destruction now is worse than in Somalia, Sierra Leone, South Sudan and Uganda.

A number of tunnels leading into both Israel and Egypt were destroyed throughout the operation. There were reports that the tunnels between Gaza and Egypt were bringing an estimated $700 million into Gaza's economy through goods or services. Several Palestinians argued that the tunnels had been critical to supporting the residents of Gaza, either through the employment they provided or through the goods that they allowed in—goods which were otherwise not available unless shipped through Egypt. However, tunnels along the Israeli border serve a purely military purpose.

During the ground invasion, Israeli forces destroyed livestock in Gaza. In Beit Hanoun, 370 cows were killed by tank shelling and airstrikes. In Beit Lahiya, 20 camels were shot by ground forces. Israel's Minister of Finance estimated that the operation would cost Israel NIS 8.5 billion (approximately US$2.5 billion), which is similar to Operation Cast Lead in 2009 and higher than Operation Pillar of Defense in 2012. The forecast included military and non-military costs, including military expenditure and property damage. The calculation indicated that if the operation lasted 20 days, the loss in GDP would be 0.4%.

== Reactions ==
=== International ===
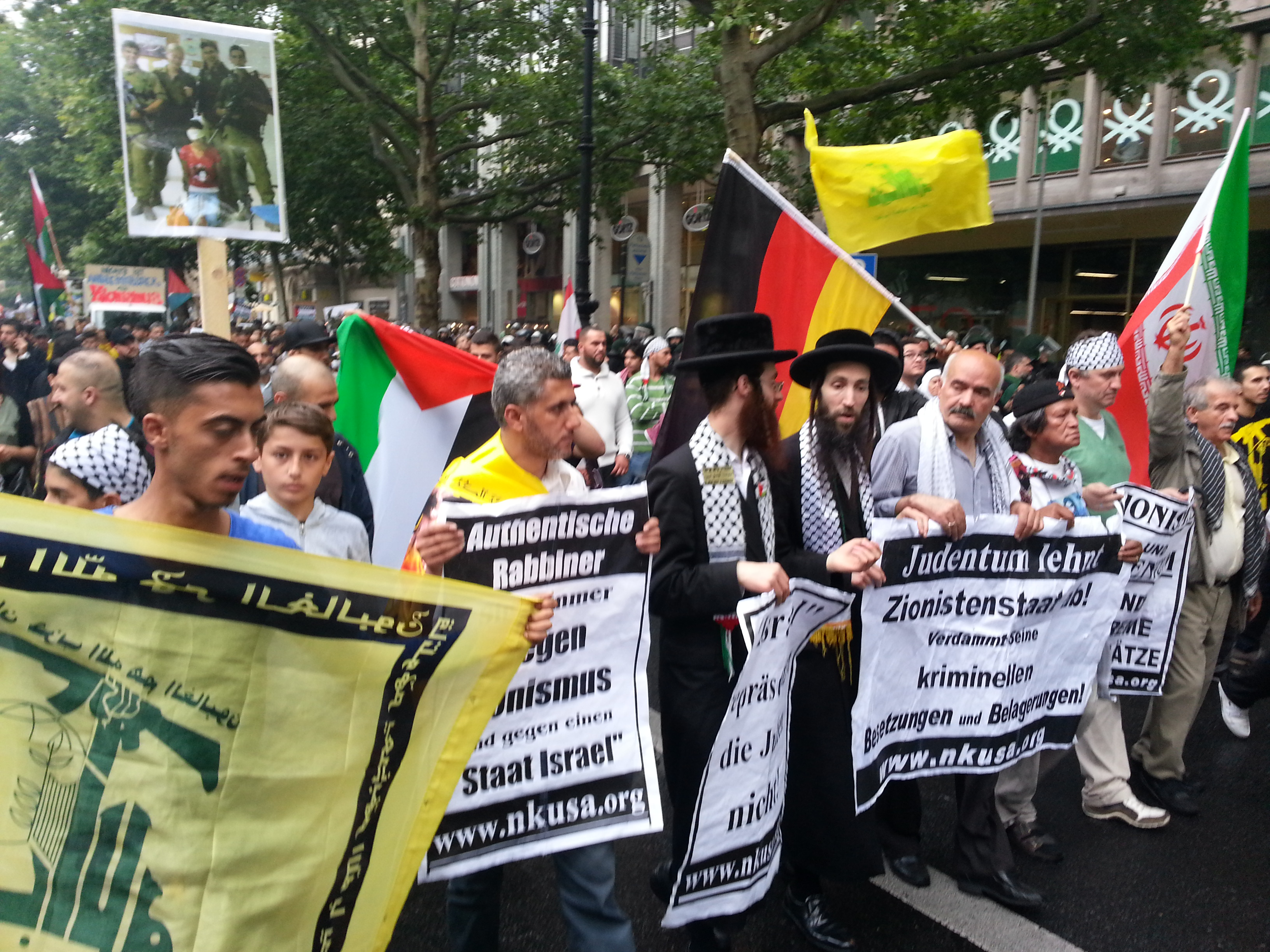
Quds Day 2014 pro-Palestinian protest in Berlin, 25 July 2014

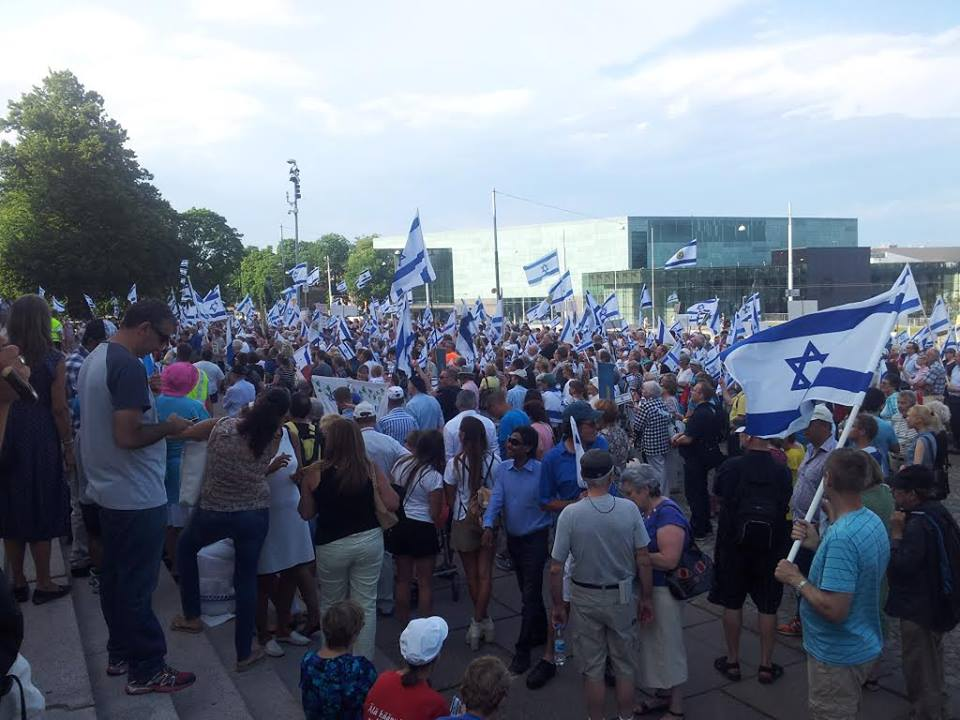
Pro-Israel demonstration in Helsinki, Finland

International reactions to the conflict came from many countries and international organizations around the world.

Canada was supportive of Israel and critical of Hamas. The BRICS countries called for restraint on both sides and a return to peace talks based on the Arab Peace Initiative. The European Union condemned the violations of the laws of war by both sides, while stressing the "unsustainable nature of the status quo", and calling for a settlement based on the two-state solution. The Non-Aligned Movement, the Arab League, and most Latin American countries were critical of Israel, with some countries in the latter group withdrawing their ambassadors from Israel in protest. South Africa called for restraint by both sides and an end to "collective punishment of Palestinians".

There were many pro-Israel and pro-Palestine demonstrations worldwide, including inside Israel and the Palestinian territories. According to OCHA, 23 Palestinians were killed and 2,218 were wounded by the IDF (38% of the latter by live fire) during these demonstrations.

=== United States ===
U.S. President Barack Obama acknowledged Israel's right to defend itself, but urged restraint by both sides. Meanwhile, the United States Congress expressed vigorous support for Israel. It passed legislation providing Israel with an additional $225 million in military aid for missile defense with a bipartisan 395–8 vote in the House of Representatives and by unanimous consent in the Senate. This was in addition to strong measures supporting Israel's position passed with overwhelming support in both houses. Israel received strong statements of bipartisan support from the leadership and members of both houses of Congress for its actions during the conflict. A poll conducted in July found that 57% of Americans believed the operation was justified.

During the U.S. presidential primary race of 2016, Democratic candidate Bernie Sanders criticized Israel for its treatment of Gaza, and in particular criticized Netanyahu for "overreacting" and causing unnecessary civilian deaths. In April 2016, the Anti-Defamation League called on Sanders to withdraw remarks he made to the Daily News, which the ADL said exaggerated the death toll of the 2014 Israel–Gaza conflict. Sanders said "over 10,000 innocent people were killed", a number far in excess of Palestinian or Israel sources' estimates. In response, Sanders said that he accepted a corrected number of the death toll as 2,300 during the course of the interview, which was taped, and that he would make every effort to set the record straight. The written transcript of the interview failed to note that Sanders said "Okay" to the corrected number presented by the interviewer during the course of the interview.

=== Gaza ===
On 6 August 2014, thousands of Palestinians rallied in Gaza in support of Hamas, demanding an end to the blockade of Gaza. After the 26 August ceasefire, the Palestinian Center for Policy and Survey Research conducted a poll in the West Bank and the Gaza Strip: 79% of respondents said that Hamas had won the war and 61% said that they would pick Hamas leader Ismail Haniyeh as the Palestinian president, up from 41% before the war.

According to The Washington Post, a percentage of Gazans held Hamas accountable for the humanitarian crisis and wanted the militants to stop firing rockets from their neighborhoods to avoid Israeli reaction. Some of the Gazans have attempted to protest against Hamas, which routinely accuses protesters of being Israeli spies and has killed more than 50 such protesters. Around 6 August, Palestinian protesters reportedly attacked and beat up Hamas spokesperson Sami Abu Zuhri because they blamed Hamas for inciting Operation Protective Edge.

An unknown number of Palestinians, estimated in the hundreds or thousands, tried to flee to Europe due to the conflict. The Palestinian rights group Adamir collected the names of 400 missing persons. In what was described by International Organization for Migration as the "worst shipwreck in years", a boat carrying refugees was rammed by smugglers and capsized off the coast of Malta, resulting in the deaths of about 400 people. According to interviews with survivors, they paid smugglers between $2,000–$5,000 or used legal travel permits, to get to Egypt. One refugee who died had considered the boat to be rickety but told his father "I have no life in Gaza anyway".

=== Israel and the West Bank ===
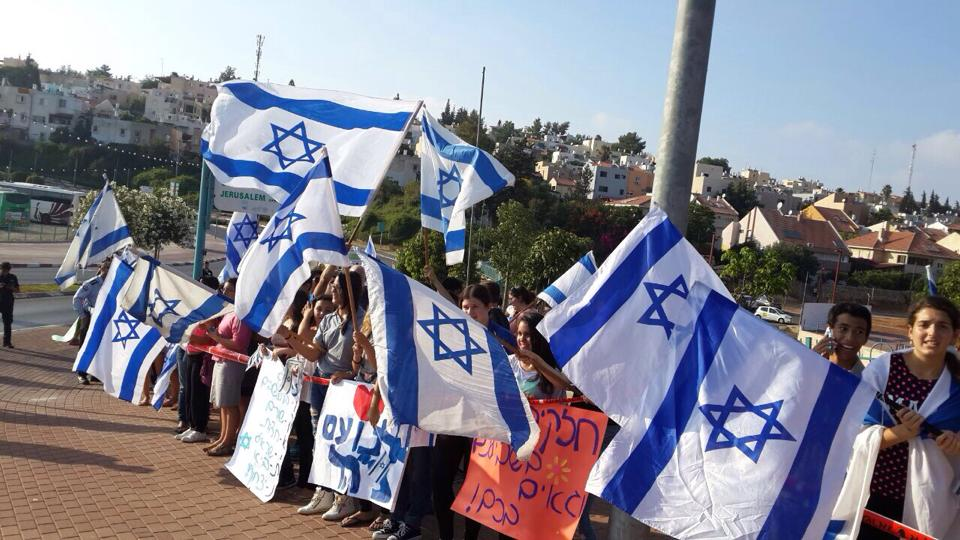
A pro-Israeli demonstration supporting Israel and the Israel Defense Forces in Tzuk Eytan

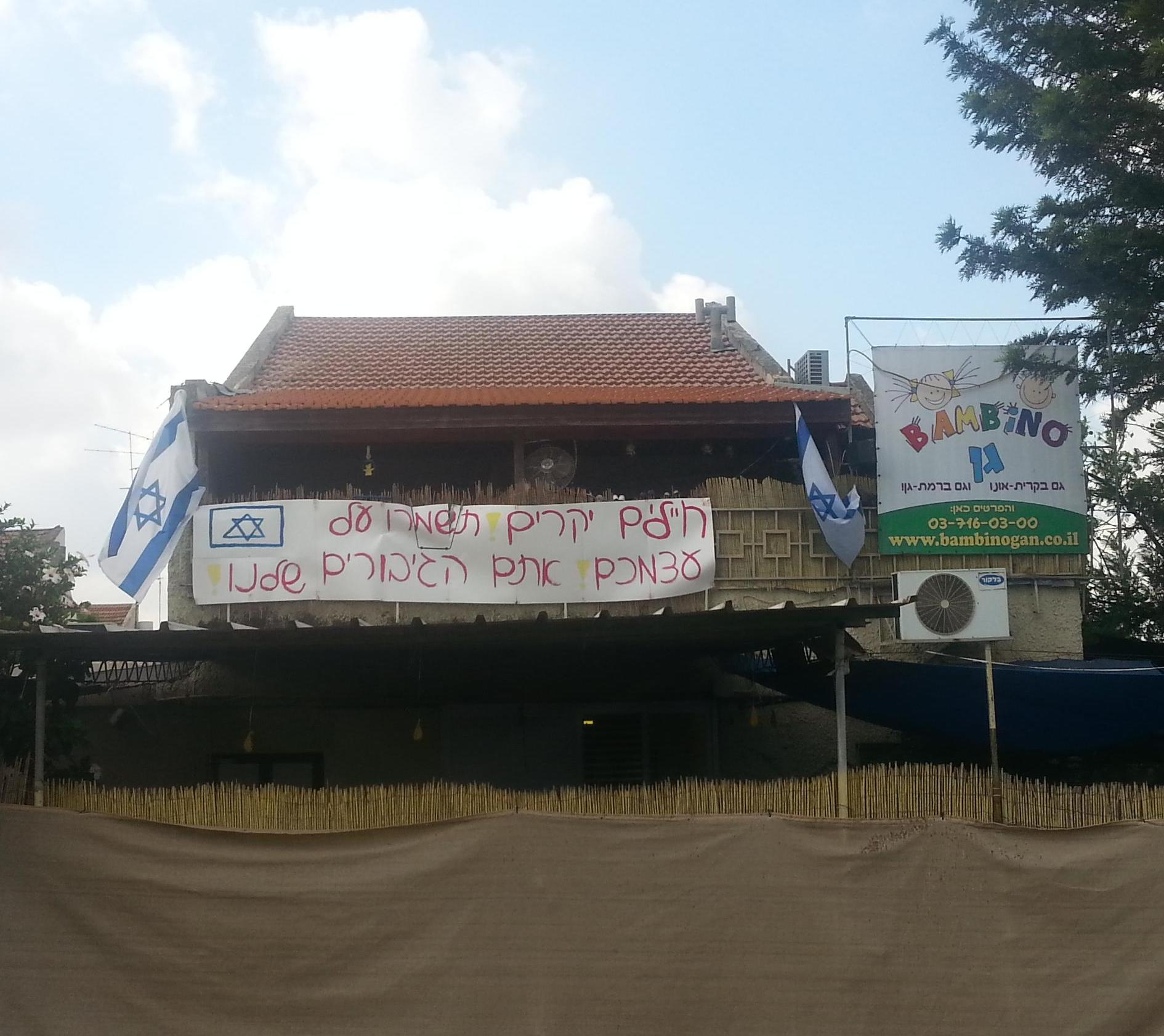
Banner on a kindergarten in Kiryat Ono saying "Dear soldiers! Take care of yourselves! You are our heroes!"

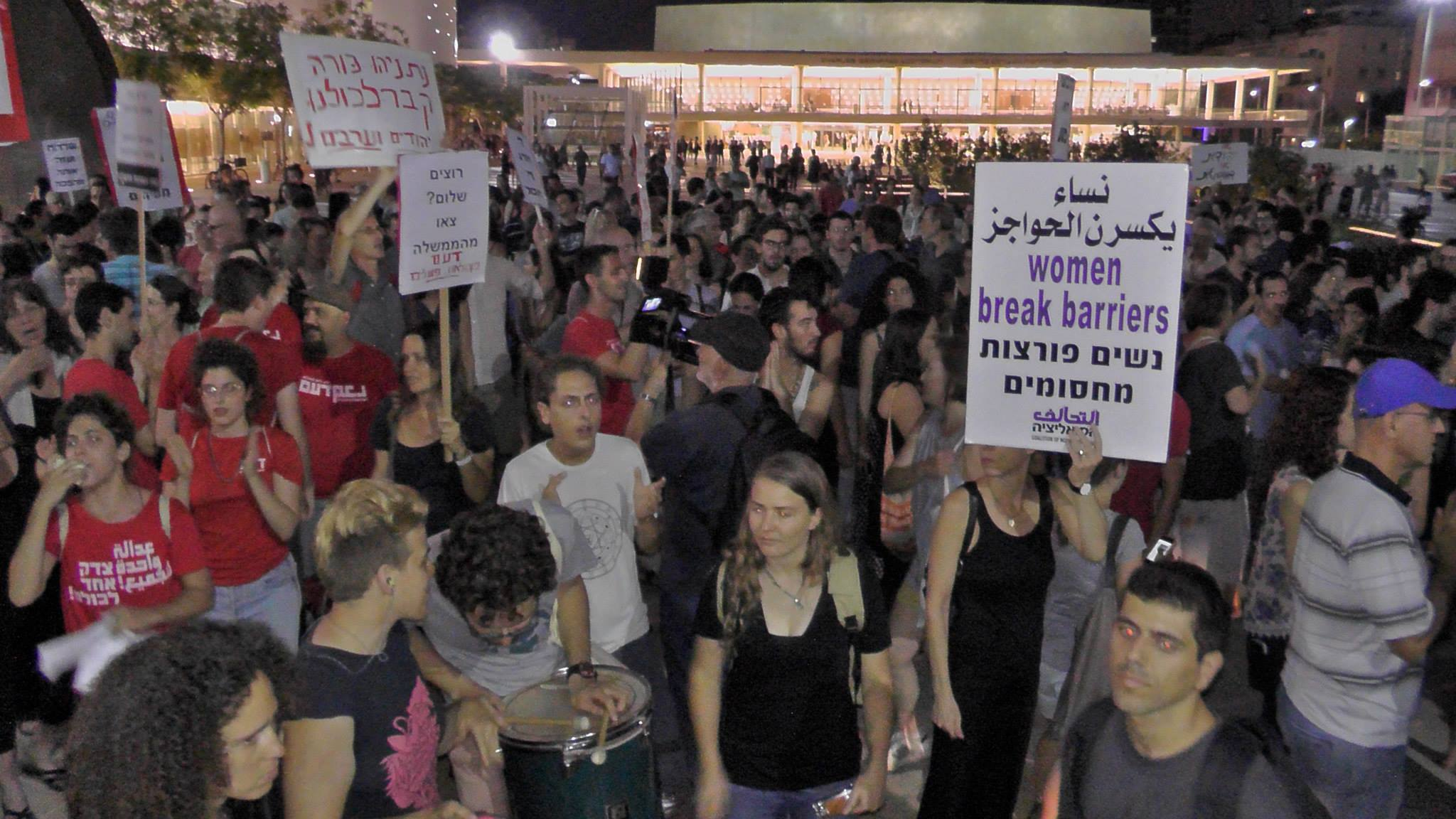
Demonstration against Operation Protective Edge in Tel Aviv, Israel

A majority of the Israeli public supported Operation Protective Edge. A poll conducted after a temporary ceasefire came into effect during the war in July found that 86.5% of Israelis polled opposed the ceasefire. Another poll in July found 91% support for the operation among the Jewish public, with 85% opposed to stopping the war and 51% in support of continuing the war until Hamas was removed from power in Gaza, while 4% believed the war to be a mistake. Two other polls found 90% and 95% support for the war among the Jewish public. Towards the end of the war, after Israel announced the withdrawal of ground forces from Gaza, a poll found 92% support for the war among the Jewish public, and that 48% believed that the IDF had used the appropriate amount of firepower in the operation, while 45% believed it had used too little and 6% believed it had used too much. The poll also found that 62% of Israeli-Arabs believed the operation was unjustified while 24% believed it was justified, and that 62% believed too much firepower was used, 10% believed too little firepower was used, and 3% thought the appropriate amount of firepower was used.

The war saw strained relations between Israeli Jews and Israeli Arabs. Many Arab businesses closed as part of a one-day general strike in solidarity with Gaza, leading to Israeli Foreign Minister Avigdor Lieberman to call for the boycott of Arab businesses that participated in the strike. Thousands demonstrated against the war, including some who threw stones and blocked streets. About 1,500 Arabs were arrested over involvement in protests against the war. Numerous Arabs were fired or disciplined by their employers over comments against Israel and the war on social media. The most notable case was that of a psychological counselor who worked for the Lod municipality, who was terminated on the orders of the Mayor of Lod after writing a Facebook post expressing joy over the deaths of 13 Israeli soldiers in the Battle of Shuja'iyya. Arabs reported an increase in racism and violence from right-wing Jews. However, some Israeli Jews against the war joined in anti-war protests, and a handful were also arrested.

There were continuous protests and clashes in the West Bank. The funeral of Mohammed Abu Khdeir on 4 July was joined by thousands of mourners, and was accompanied by clashes across east Jerusalem throughout the weekend. According to OCHA, 23 Palestinians were killed and 2,218 were wounded by the IDF, 38% of the latter by live fire. According to the PLO, 32 Palestinians were killed in the West Bank in the period 13 June – 26 August, nearly 1400 were wounded by Israeli fire and 1,700 were detained in the largest offensive in the West Bank since the Second Intifada. The PLO also stated that 1,472 settlement homes had been approved over the summer.

During the war there were over 360 attacks on Jews from the West Bank, a spate that was thought by The Jerusalem Post to have "peaked" on 4 August with a tractor attack in Jerusalem and the shooting of a uniformed soldier in the French Hill neighborhood, leading to an increase in security in the city.

On 1 September, Israel announced a plan to expropriate 1,000 acres of land in the West Bank, reportedly as a "reaction to the deplorable murder in June of three Israeli teenagers", which Amnesty International denounced as the "largest land grab in the Occupied Palestinian Territories since the 1980s". The EU complained about the land expropriation and warned of renewed violence in Gaza; the US called it "counterproductive".

== Alleged violations of international humanitarian law ==
A number of legal and moral issues concerning the conflict arose during course of the fighting. Various human rights groups have argued that both Palestinian rocket attacks and Israeli targeted destruction of homes of Hamas and other militia members violated international humanitarian law and might constitute war crimes, violations of international humanitarian law. Navi Pillay, the United Nations High Commissioner for Human Rights, accused Hamas militants of violating international humanitarian law by "locating rockets within schools and hospitals, or even launching these rockets from densely populated areas." She also criticized Israel's military operation, stating that there was "a strong possibility that international law has been violated, in a manner that could amount to war crimes", and specifically criticizing Israel's actions in Gaza as disproportionate.

Amnesty International found evidence that "[d]uring the current hostilities, Hamas spokespeople reportedly urged residents in some areas of the Gaza Strip not to leave their homes after the Israeli military dropped leaflets and made phone calls warning people in the area to evacuate", and that international humanitarian law was clear in that "even if officials or fighters from Hamas or Palestinian armed groups associated with other factions did in fact direct civilians to remain in a specific location in order to shield military objectives from attacks, all of Israel's obligations to protect these civilians would still apply." B'tselem found that Hamas had breached provisions of International Humanitarian Law (IHL), both firing from civilian areas and firing at Israeli civilian areas. It also stated that the Israeli policy of bombing homes, formulated by government officials and the senior military command, though claimed to be in conformity with IHL, was 'unlawful', and designed to 'block, a priori, any allegations that Israel breached IHL provisions', in that it relies on an interpretation that leaves 'no restrictions whatsoever on Israeli action' so that 'whatever method it chooses to respond to Hamas operations is legitimate, no matter how horrifying the consequences.'

Hamas leader Ismail Haniyeh urged the Palestinian Authority to sign the Rome Statute of the International Criminal Court (ICC). ICC prosecutor Geoffrey Nice said that a "decision to do nothing clearly emerges from the meeting" with the PA foreign minister Riad Malki.

Israel announced its own investigations of both military and civilian leadership and the conduct during the war. Human rights organizations have expressed little confidence in Israel's measures, citing past experience. Moreover, several human rights organizations were denied access to Gaza by Israel, rendering it impossible for them to carry out on-site investigations. B'Tselem has refused to participate in the army investigation calling it a "whitewashing mechanism". According to The New York Times, "Of 44 cases initially referred to army fact-finding teams for preliminary examination, seven have been closed, including one involving the death of eight members of a family when their home was struck on 8 July, the first day of the Israeli air campaign, and others are pending."

=== UN report ===
The United Nations Human Rights Council (UNHRC) commissioned the United Nations Fact Finding Mission on the 2014 Israel–Gaza conflict, led by William Schabas to investigate war crimes allegations by both sides. Israel criticized Schabas as biased because he had made statements critical of Israel and sympathetic to Hamas. Schabas denied any bias, but on 2 February 2015 resigned from the position.

Israel refused to cooperate with the commission by denying them access to the Occupied Palestinian territories and not responding to a list of questions relating to specific incidents. The State of Palestine fully cooperated with the investigation.

The commission issued its report on 22 June 2015 and found evidence of war crimes by both Israel and Hamas.The report criticized Israel for its disproportionate airstrikes that damaged approximately 18,000 dwellings, its indiscriminate use of weapons in civilian areas, the high number of civilian casualties in the Battle of Shuja'iyya and "Black Friday" attacks on Rafah, and for letting violations of international law by IDF soldiers go unpunished. The report also found that rockets fired from Gaza into Israel by Hamas and other Palestinian militants were intended to spread terror.

Israel dismissed the investigation as "politically motivated and morally flawed", while Hamas said it wrongly equated "the victim and executioner".

=== Alleged violations by Hamas ===
==== Killing and shooting of Gazan civilians ====
Twenty alleged spies for Israel from Shuja'iyya were killed. A few days later, Hamas reportedly killed two Gazans and wounded ten after a scuffle broke out over food handouts.

The IDF stated on 31 July that more than 280 Hamas rockets malfunctioned and fell inside the Gaza strip, hitting sites including Al-Shifa Hospital and the Al-Shati refugee camp, killing at least 11 and wounding dozens. Hamas denied that any of its rockets hit the Gaza Strip., but Palestinian sources said numerous rocket launches ended up falling in Gaza communities and that scores of people have been killed or injured. Israeli Military sources said the failed Hamas launches increased amid heavy Israeli air and artillery strikes throughout the Gaza Strip. They said the failed launches reflected poorly assembled rockets as well as the rush to load and fire projectiles before they are spotted by Israeli aircraft. While the Al-Shifa Hospital incident is disputed, early news reports have suggested that the strike was from an Israeli drone missile. Amnesty International concluded that the explosion at the Shati refugee camp on 28 July in which 13 civilians were killed was caused by a Palestinian rocket, despite Palestinian claims it was an Israeli missile.

==== Killing of suspected collaborators ====
During the conflict, Hamas executed Gazan civilians it accused of having collaborated with Israel, thirty on 30 July. The United Nations Investigatory Commission concluded that at least 21 persons (Note: 25 according to Human Rights Watch, 23 according to Amnesty International) were killed in Gaza City in summary executions for collaboration between 5 and 22 August 2014 in Gaza City, most on the last date. 11 of those shot by firing squads on 22 August, a day after 3 al-Qassam brigade commanders had been killed in an Israeli strike at Rafah, had been taken from Al-Katiba prison. 7 were shot the same evening in "Operation Strangling Necks" directed against alleged collaborators. Norman Finkelstein compared the dilemma facing Hamas regarding collaboration within the ranks as similar to that expressed by Jewish leaders in the aftermath of the Warsaw Ghetto Uprising.

Abbas' Secretary-General, Al-Tayyib Abd al-Rahim, condemned the "random executions of those who Hamas called collaborators", adding that some of those killed had been detained for more than three years. Amnesty International, Human Rights Watch and Palestinian human rights groups condemned the executions. Bodies of the victims were brought to hospitals to be added to the number of civilian casualties of Israeli operation. According to a Shin Bet official, "not even one" of the alleged collaborators executed by Hamas provided any intelligence to Israel, while the Shin Bet officially "confirmed that those executed during Operation Protective Edge had all been held in prison in Gaza in the course of the hostilities."

Senior Hamas official Moussa Abu Marzouk confirmed that some victims were kept under arrest before the conflict began and were executed to satisfy the public without due legal procedure.

Shurat HaDin filed a suit with the ICC charging Khaled Mashal with war crimes for the executions of 38 civilians. Hamas co-founder Ayman Taha was found dead; Al-Quds Al-Arabi reported he had been shot by Hamas for maintaining contact with the intelligence services of several Arab countries; Hamas stated he was targeted by an Israeli airstrike.

On 26 May 2015, Amnesty International released a report saying that Hamas carried out extrajudicial killings, abductions and arrests of Palestinians and used the Al-Shifa Hospital to detain, interrogate and torture suspects. It details the executions of at least 23 Palestinians accused of collaborating with Israel and torture of dozens of others, many victims of torture were members of the rival Palestinian movement, Fatah.

==== Endangerment of Civilians ====
===== Human shields =====
The European Union condemned Hamas, and in particular condemned "calls on the civilian population of Gaza to provide themselves as human shields." Confirmation of this practice was produced by correspondents from France24, The Financial Times, and RT, who respectively filmed a rocket launch pad which was placed in a civilian area next to a hotel where international journalists were staying, reported on rockets being fired from near Al-Shifa Hospital, and reported on Hamas firing rockets near a hotel. In September 2014, a Hamas official acknowledged to an Associated Press reporter that the group had fired rockets from civilian areas.

While the Israeli government repeatedly stated that many civilian casualties were the result of Hamas using the Gazan population as human shields several British media organizations (including The Guardian, and The Independent) dismissed such claims as "myths" and the BBC's Middle East editor Jeremy Bowen likewise said he "saw no evidence of Hamas using Palestinians as human shields." Additionally the London-based NGO, Amnesty International, dismissed such claims, stated it was unable to verify them and emphasized that even if they were true the IDF would still have a responsibility to protect civilians.

The statements fall into two categories: using civilian structures like homes, mosques and hospitals to store munitions in or launch rockets from, and urging or forcing civilian population to stay in their homes, to shield militants. Israeli soldiers have also said Hamas operatives directly employed women and children as involuntary human shields to evade pursuit, while Hamas and others have said such accusations are false. Asa Kasher, who helped to write the Israel Defense Forces's Code of Conduct, argued that "Israel cannot forfeit its ability to protect its citizens against attacks simply because terrorists hide behind non-combatants. If it did so, it would be giving up any right to self-defense."

===== Use of civilian structures for military purposes =====
The UN High Commissioner for Human Rights (UNHCHR) Navi Pillay accused Hamas militants of violating international humanitarian law by "locating rockets within schools and hospitals, or even launching these rockets from densely populated areas." But she added that this did not absolve Israel from disregarding the same law. The UNHCHR report recognised that "the obligation to avoid locating military objectives within densely populated areas is not absolute. The small size of Gaza and its population density make it difficult for armed groups to always comply with this requirement."

In a 2015 report, Amnesty International states that "There are credible reports that, in certain cases, Palestinian armed groups launched rockets or mortars from within civilian facilities or compounds, including schools, at least one hospital and a Greek Orthodox church in Gaza City. In at least two cases, accounts indicate that attacks were launched in spite of the fact that displaced Gazan civilians were sheltering in the compounds or in neighbouring buildings.".

Israel has stated that many mosques, schools and hospitals were used to store weapons. The IDF spokesman said that mortar shells were fired from a boys' school that served as a shelter for refugees. There were reports of the use of mosques to store weapons, and having launch sites very close to civilian structures. Gaza's Greek Orthodox archbishop has said that Hamas used the church compound, which sheltered 2000 Muslim civilians, to launch rockets into Israel. France 24 correspondent Gallagher Fenwick reported that a Hamas rocket-launching pad was placed in densely populated neighborhood of Gaza City, about 50 meters from the hotel where the majority of international media were staying and 100 meters from a UN building. Fenwick said that "children can be seen playing on and near the rocket launcher".

Israel released footage of Palestinian militants launching rockets from a school and a cemetery. In at least one case a cemetery was targeted by an Israeli airstrike.

According to Shabak, the Israeli internal security service, some militants, when interrogated, admitted using civilian buildings for military purposes. The admissions included more than ten mosques that were used for gatherings, training, storage of weapons, tunnel activities and military observations. During interrogations, one militant said that he was instructed in case of successful abduction using a tunnel to take the victim to a kindergarten located near its opening.

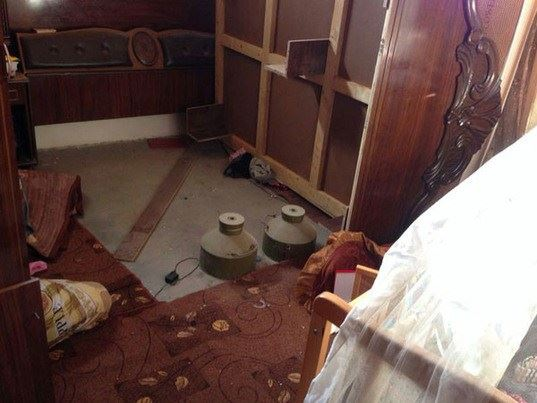
Explosives were allegedly two steps away from a baby's bed in Gaza during the war.

On 24 August, Israel released part of what it says is a Hamas training manual on urban warfare, which states "the process of hiding ammunition inside buildings is intended for ambushes in residential areas and to move the campaign from open areas into built up and closed areas" and "residents of the area should be used to bring in the equipment...take advantage of this to avoid [Israeli] spy planes and attack drones." The manual also explains how fighting from within civilian population makes IDF operations difficult and what the benefits of civilian deaths are. Hamas spokesman Sami Abu Zuhri dismissed the document as a "forgery...aimed at justifying the mass killings of Palestinian civilians."

On 12 September, Ghazi Hamad, a senior Hamas official, acknowledged for the first time that Hamas did fire rockets from civilian areas and said "some mistakes were made".

====== In Israel ======
Israeli and Jewish critics of the war, including Uri Avnery and Gideon Levy wrote that in their own war of independence in 1948 (and earlier), Jews hid weapons in synagogues, kindergartens and schools as well. Other critics have noted that the headquarters of the IDF and Shin Bet, as well as an Israeli military training facility, are also located near civilian centers. Commentators brought up the current high population density of Gaza in conjunction with Palestinian military activities and installations being in or near civilian structures.

====== Legality ======
Using civilian structures to store munitions and launch attacks from is unlawful, and the Fourth Geneva Convention states that "The presence of a protected person may not be used to render certain points or areas immune from military operations." On the other hand, another convention says that "Any violation of these prohibitions shall not release the parties to the conflict from their legal obligations with respect to the civilian population and civilians, including the obligation to take the precautionary measures."

According to Harriet Sherwood, writer for the Guardian, even if Hamas were violating the law on this matter, it would not legally justify Israel's bombing of areas where civilians are known to be. Amnesty International stated that "Indiscriminate and disproportionate attacks (where the likely number of civilian casualties or damage to civilian property outweighs the anticipated military advantage to be gained) are ... prohibited." It said that "Israel's relentless air assault on Gaza has seen its forces flagrantly disregard civilian life and property". Human Rights Watch has said that in many cases "the Israeli military has presented no information to show that it was attacking lawful military objectives or acted to minimize civilian casualties." An investigation by Human Rights Watch found that "in most of the sites we investigated so far (in this conflict) we found no valid military targets". A high-level group of former diplomats and military experts concluded that "the IDF acted within the bounds of international law during the war." The Israeli government issued a report saying that its military actions were "lawful and legitimate" and that "Israel made substantial efforts to avoid civilian deaths." The High Level Military Group, composed of military experts from Australia, Colombia, France, Germany, India, Italy, Britain, the United States, and Spain, released an assessment on Operation Protective Edge acknowledging Israel made "unprecedented efforts" to avoid civilian casualties exceeding international standards.

===== Medical facilities and personnel =====
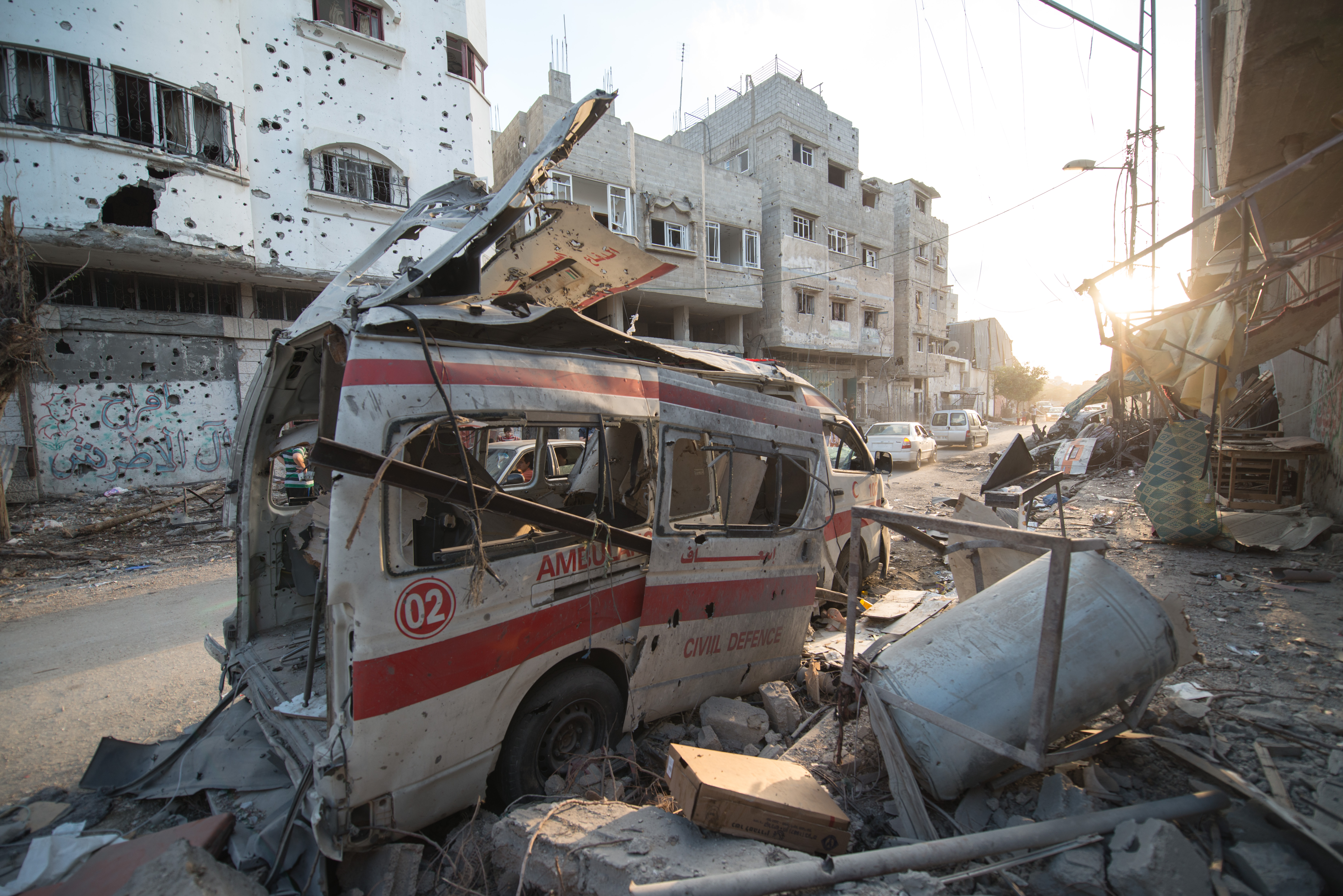
Photo taken during the 72-hour ceasefire between Hamas and Israel on 6 August 2014. A destroyed ambulance in Shuja'iyya in the Gaza Strip.

Medical units including hospitals and medical personnel have special protections under international humanitarian law. They lose their protection only if they commit, outside their humanitarian function, "acts harmful to the enemy." More than 25 medical facilities were damaged in the conflict; one attack on Al-Aqsa hospital killed 5 people. In many cases, ambulances and other medical personnel were hit. Amnesty International has condemned the attacks and said that there is "mounting evidence" that Israel deliberately targeted hospitals and medical personnel; Israel said it had not.

A Finnish reporter from Helsingin Sanomat reported seeing rockets fired from near the Gaza Al-Shifa hospital. The IDF said that in several cases Hamas used Wafa hospital as a military base and used ambulances to transport its fighters. According to the Israeli Shabak, many of the militants it interrogated said that "everyone knew" that Hamas leaders were using hospitals for hiding. Hamas security reportedly wore police uniforms and blocked access to certain parts of the hospitals. One of the interrogated militants reportedly said that civilians seeking medical attention usually were thrown out by the security. The Washington Post described Al-Shifa hospital as a "de facto headquarters for Hamas leaders, who can be seen in the hallways and offices." Amnesty International reported that: "Hamas forces used the abandoned areas of al-Shifa hospital in Gaza City, including the outpatients' clinic area, to detain, interrogate, torture and otherwise ill-treat suspects, even as other parts of the hospital continued to function as a medical centre".

French-Palestinian journalist Radjaa Abu Dagga reported that Hamas militants interrogated him in Gaza's main hospital (Al-Shifa); his report was later removed from his paper's website at his request.

Mohammed Al Falahi, Secretary General of Red Crescent, UAE said that Hamas militants fired on Israeli planes from Red Crescent's field hospital in order to provoke retaliation, attacked Red Crescent team on their way back and planted land mines on their path.

===== Urging or forcing civilians to stay in their homes =====
The IDF has released photographs which it says show civilians on rooftops, and a video of Hamas spokesperson Sami Abu Zuhri saying "the fact that people are willing to sacrifice themselves against Israeli warplanes in order to protect their homes [...] is proving itself". The EU has strongly condemned "calls on the civilian population of Gaza to provide themselves as human shields" and US Congress-members introduced bills condemning Hamas for using human shields. Civilians and activists in Gaza used themselves as 'human shields' in attempts to prevent Israeli attacks.

Hamas officials said human shields were not used. One Gazan stated that "nobody is safe and nobody can flee anywhere because everywhere is targeted." Many reporters, including from the BBC, the Independent and the Guardian said that they found no evidence of Hamas forcing Palestinians to stay and become unwilling human shields.

Fatah officials said that Hamas placed over 250 Fatah members under house arrest or in jail, putting them under threat of being killed by Israeli strikes and shooting them in the legs or breaking their limbs if they tried to leave. According to Abbas, more than 300 Fatah members were placed under house arrest and 120 were executed for fleeing.

Amnesty International reported that it did "not have evidence at this point" that Palestinian civilians were intentionally used by Hamas or Palestinian armed groups during the current hostilities to "shield" specific locations or military personnel or equipment from Israeli attacks". It additionally said that "public statements referring to entire areas are not the same as directing specific civilians to remain in their homes as "human shields" for fighters, munitions, or military equipment" and that "even if officials or fighters from Hamas or Palestinian armed groups ... did in fact direct civilians to remain in a specific location in order to shield military objectives ..., all of Israel's obligations to protect these civilians would still apply." Human Rights Watch said many of the attacks on targets appeared to be "disproportionate" and "indiscriminate".

Human Rights Watch attributed many civilian deaths to the lack of safe places to flee to, and accused Israel of firing at fleeing civilians. It stated that there are many reasons that prevent civilians from abiding by warnings, and that the failure to abide by warnings does not make civilians lawful targets.

==== Rocket attacks on Israeli civilians ====
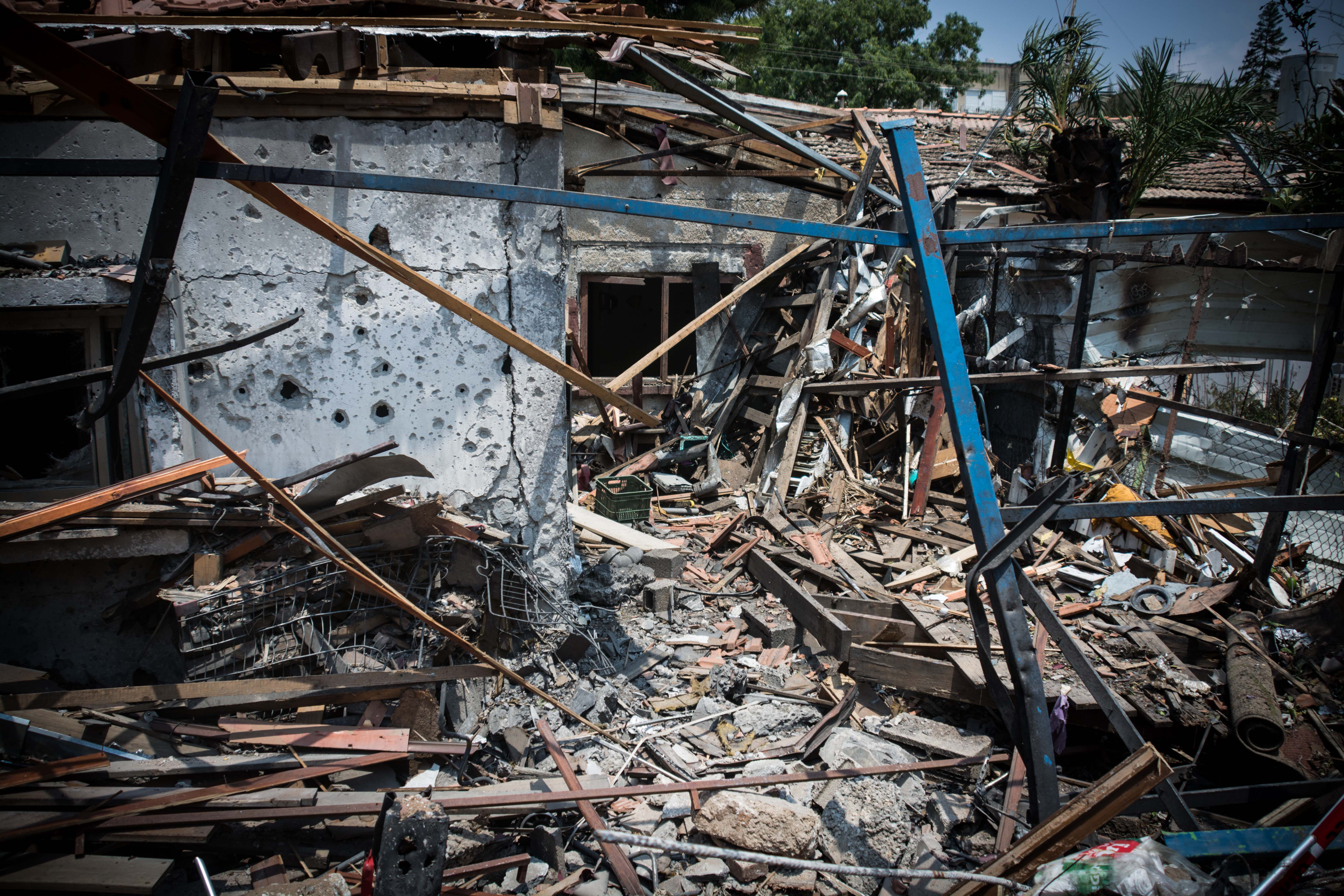
House destroyed by a rocket in Yehud, Israel

Human rights organizations, including Amnesty International, pointed to Hamas's rocket attacks on Israeli cities as violations of international law and war crimes. Palestinian ambassador to the UN Human Rights Council, Ibrahim Khraishi stated in a 9 July interview on PA TV that the "missiles that are now being launched against Israel – each and every missile constitutes a crime against humanity, whether it hits or misses, because it is directed at civilian targets".

Hamas political figure Khaled Mashal has defended the firing of rockets into Israel, saying that "our victims are civilians and theirs are soldiers". According to one report, "nearly all the 2,500–3,000 rockets and mortars Hamas has fired at Israel since the start of the war seem to have been aimed at towns", including an attack on "a kibbutz collective farm close to the Gaza border", in which an Israeli child was killed. Former Israeli Lt. Col. Jonathan D. Halevi stated that "Hamas has expressed pride in aiming long-range rockets at strategic targets in Israel including the nuclear reactor in Dimona, the chemical plants in Haifa, and Ben-Gurion Airport", which "could have caused thousands" of Israeli casualties "if successful".

According to Israel, Hamas continued to fire rockets at the Erez border crossing while sick and wounded Gazans tried to enter Israel for treatment. The Erez border crossing is the only legal border crossing between Gaza and Israel. Other people affected by this included journalists, UN workers, and volunteers.

==== Military use of UN facilities ====
The United Nations Relief and Works Agency for Palestine Refugees in the Near East (UNRWA) has a number of institutions and schools in the Gaza region, and, as of 24 July 23 had been closed. Hamas took advantage of the closures to employ some of these vacant UNRWA buildings as weapon storage sites. UNRWA officials, on discovering that three such vacated schools had been employed for storing rockets, condemned Hamas's actions, calling it a "flagrant violation of the neutrality of our premises."

On 16 July, 22 July, and on 29 July, the UNRWA announced that rockets had been found in their schools. Israel's foreign minister Avigdor Lieberman stated that UNRWA had turned over some discovered rockets to Hamas. Israel Democracy Institute Vice President, Mordechai Kremnitzer, accused the UNRWA of war crimes for handing over the rockets, while Hebrew University Professor Robbie Sabel stated that the UNRWA "had no legal obligation to hand the rockets over to Israel" and had little other choice in the matter. UNRWA states the armouries had been transferred to local police authorities under the Ramallah national unity government's authority, in accordance with "longstanding UN practice in UN humanitarian operations worldwide". UN Secretary Ban Ki-moon ordered an investigation.

On 30 July, the IDF said that they had discovered the entrance to a tunnel concealed inside a UNRWA medical clinic in Khan Yunis. The clinic was rigged with explosives, which then exploded and killed three Israeli soldiers. This report was later corrected by the Coordinator of Government Activities in the Territories, the military unit that implements government policies in the Palestinian areas, who later that day stated that despite its UNRWA sign, the site was not registered as belonging to UNRWA.

==== Intimidation of journalists ====
Israeli officials said Hamas intimidates journalists in Gaza. A French reporter said that he was "detained and interrogated by members of Hamas's al-Qassam Brigade" in Gaza's Al-Shifa hospital, and forced to leave Gaza; he later asked the newspaper to remove his article from their site. Some journalists reported threats on social media against those who tweet about rocket launch sites. John Reed of The Financial Times was threatened after he tweeted about rockets being fired from near Al-Shifa Hospital, and RT correspondent Harry Fear was told to leave Gaza after he tweeted that Hamas fired rockets from near his hotel. Isra al-Modallal, head of foreign relations for the Hamas Information Ministry, said Hamas did deport foreign journalists who filmed Hamas rocket launches, stating that by filming the launch sites the journalists were collaborating with Israel. The Foreign Press Association (FPA) in Israel and the Palestinian territories protested what it called "blatant, incessant, forceful and unorthodox methods employed by the Hamas authorities ... against visiting international journalists in Gaza", saying several had been harassed or questioned over information they reported. It also said that Hamas was trying to "put in place a 'vetting' procedure" that would allow the blacklisting of specific journalists. The Jerusalem Post said UNRWA workers were threatened by Hamas at gun-point during the war, but Christopher Gunness, UNRWA spokesman, said "I have checked and double checked with sources in Gaza and there is no evidence of death threats made to UNRWA personnel."

Some FPA members disputed the FPA's comments, including New York Times Jerusalem bureau chief Jodi Rudoren, who wrote "every reporter I've met who was in Gaza during [the] war says this Israeli/now FPA narrative of Hamas harassment is nonsense." Haaretz interviewed many foreign journalists and found "all but a few of the journalists deny any such pressure". They said Hamas's intimidation was no worse than what they got from the IDF, and said no armed forces would permit reporters to broadcast militarily sensitive information; and that, furthermore, most reporters seldom saw Hamas fighters, because they fought from concealed locations and in places that were too dangerous to approach.

=== Alleged violations by Israel ===
Israel received some 500 complaints concerning 360 alleged violations. 80 were closed without criminal charges, 6 cases were opened on incidents allegedly involving criminal conduct, and in one case regarding 3 IDF soldiers in the aftermath of the Battle of Shuja'iyya, a charge of looting was laid. Most cases were closed for what the military magistrates considered to be lack of evidence to sustain a charge of misconduct. No mention was made of incidents during the "Black Friday" events at Rafah.

According to Assaf Sharon of Tel Aviv University, the IDF was pressured by politicians to unleash unnecessary violence whose basic purpose was 'to satisfy a need for vengeance,' which the politicians themselves tried to whip up in Israel's population. Asa Kasher wrote that the IDF was pulled into fighting "that is both strategically and morally asymmetric" and that like any other army it made mistakes, but the charges it faces are "grossly unfair". The Israeli NGO Breaking the Silence, reporting on its analysis of 111 testimonies concerning the war by some 70 IDF soldiers and officers, cited one veteran's remark that "Anyone found in an IDF area, which the IDF had occupied, was not a civilian," to argue that this was the basic rule of engagement. Soldiers were briefed to regard everything inside the Strip as a threat. The report cites several examples of civilians, including women, being shot dead and defined as "terrorists" in later reports. Since leaflets were dropped telling civilians to leave areas to be bombed, soldiers could assume any movement in a bombed area entitled them to shoot. In one case that came under investigation, Lt Col Neria Yeshurun ordered a Palestinian medical centre to be shelled to avenge the killing of one of his officers by a sniper.

==== Civilian deaths ====
Many of those killed were civilians, prompting concern from many humanitarian organisations. An investigation by Human Rights Watch concluded that Israel had probably committed war crimes on three specific incidents involving strikes on UNWRA schools. Amnesty International stated that: "Israeli forces have carried out attacks that have killed hundreds of civilians, including through the use of precision weaponry such as drone-fired missiles, and attacks using munitions such as artillery, which cannot be precisely targeted, on very densely populated residential areas, such as Shuja'iyya. They have also directly attacked civilian objects." B'tselem has compiled an infogram listing families killed at home in 72 incidents of bombing or shelling, comprising 547 people killed, of whom 125 were women under 60, 250 were minors, and 29 were over 60. On 24 August, Palestinian health officials said that 89 families had been killed.

Nine people were killed while watching the World Cup in a cafe, and 8 members of a family died that Israel has said were inadvertently killed. A Golani soldier interviewed about his operations inside Gaza said they often could not distinguish between civilians and Hamas fighters because some Hamas operatives dressed in plainclothes and the night vision goggles made everything look green. An IDF spokesperson said that Hamas "deploys in residential areas, creating rocket launch sites, command and control centers, and other positions deep in the heart of urban areas. By doing so, Hamas chooses the battleground where the IDF is forced to operate." The highest-ranking U.S. military officer, Army General Martin Dempsey, the chairman of the Joint Chiefs of Staff, said that "Israel went to extraordinary lengths to limit collateral damage and civilian casualties". Later in his speech he said, "the Pentagon three months ago sent a 'lessons-learned team' of senior officers and non-commissioned officers to work with the IDF to see what could be learned from the Gaza operation, to include the measures they took to prevent civilian casualties and what they did with tunneling." Col. Richard Kemp told The Observer, "IDF has taken greater steps than any other army in the history of warfare to minimise harm to civilians in a combat zone"

===== Warnings prior to attacks =====
In many cases the IDF warned civilians prior to targeting militants in highly populated areas in order to comply with international law. Human rights organizations including Amnesty International, confirmed that in many cases, Palestinians received warnings prior to evacuation, including flyers, phone calls and roof knocking. A report by Jaffa based NGO Physicians for Human Rights, released in January 2015, said that Israel's alert system had failed, and that the roof-knock system was ineffective. The IDF was criticized for not giving civilians enough time to evacuate. In one case, the warning came less than one minute before the bombing. Hamas has told civilians to return to their homes or stay put following Israeli warnings to leave. In many cases, Palestinians evacuated; in others, they have stayed in their homes. Israel condemned Hamas's encouragement of Palestinians to remain in their homes despite warnings in advance of airstrikes. Hamas stated that the warnings were a form of psychological warfare and that people would be equally or more unsafe in the rest of Gaza.

Amnesty International said that "although the Israeli authorities claim to be warning civilians in Gaza, a consistent pattern has emerged that their actions do not constitute an "effective warning" under international humanitarian law." Human Rights Watch concurred. Many Gazans, when asked, told journalists that they remained in their houses simply because they had nowhere else to go. OCHA's spokesman has said "there is literally no safe place for civilians" in Gaza. Roof knocking has been condemned as unlawful by Amnesty International and Human Rights Watch as well as the United Nations Fact Finding Mission in the 2008 war.

==== Destruction of homes ====
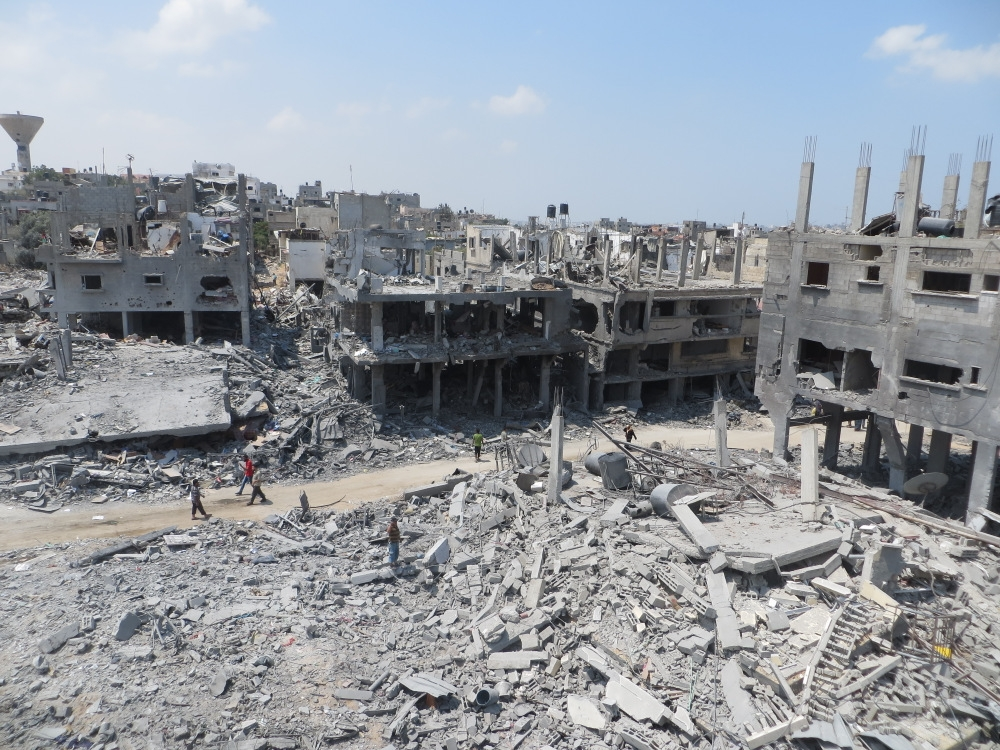
Ruins of a residential area in Beit Hanoun

Israel targeted many homes in this conflict. UNWRA official Robert Turner estimated that 7,000 homes were demolished and 89,000 were damaged, some 10,000 of them severely. This has led to many members of the same family being killed. B'Tselem documented 59 incidents of bombing and shelling, in which 458 people were killed. In some cases, Israel has stated that these homes were of suspected militants and were used for military purposes. The New York Times noted that the damage in this operation was higher than in the previous two wars and stated that 60,000 people had been left homeless as a result. The destruction of homes has been condemned by B'Tselem, Human Rights Watch and Amnesty International as unlawful, amounting to collective punishment and war crimes.

Israel destroyed the homes of two suspects in the case of the abduction and killing of the three teenagers. The house demolition has been condemned by B'Tselem as unlawful.

Palestinians returning to their homes during the ceasefire reported that IDF soldiers had trashed their homes, destroyed home electronics such as TV sets, spread feces in their homes, and carved slogans such as "Burn Gaza down" and "Good Arab = dead Arab" in walls and furniture. The IDF did not respond to a request by The Guardian for comment.

On 5 November 2014, Amnesty International published a report examining eight cases where the IDF targeted homes, resulting in the deaths of 111 people, of whom 104 were civilians. Barred from access to Gaza by Israel since 2012, it conducted its research remotely, supported by two contracted Gaza-based fieldworkers who conducted multiple visits of each site to interview survivors, and consulted with military experts to evaluate photographic and video material. It concludes, in every case, that "there was a failure to take necessary precautions to avoid excessive harm to civilians and civilian property, as required by international humanitarian law" and "no prior warning was given to the civilian residents to allow them to escape." As Israel did not disclose any information regarding the incidents, the report said it was not possible for Amnesty International to be certain of what Israel was targeting; it also said that if there were no valid military objectives, international humanitarian law may have been violated, as attacks directed at civilians and civilian objects, or attacks which are otherwise disproportionate relative to the anticipated military advantage of carrying them out, constitute war crimes.

The report was dismissed by the Israeli Ministry of Foreign Affairs as "narrow", "decontextualized", and disattentive of alleged war crimes perpetrated by Hamas. Amnesty, it asserted, was serving as "a propaganda tool for Hamas and other terror groups." Anne Herzberg, legal adviser for NGO Monitor, questioned the accuracy of the UN numbers used in the report, saying that they "essentially come from Hamas."

==== Shelling of UNRWA schools ====
There were seven shellings at UNRWA facilities in the Gaza Strip which took place between 21 July and 3 August 2014. The incidents were the result of artillery, mortar or aerial missile fire which struck on or near the UNRWA facilities being used as shelters for Palestinians, and as a result at least 44 civilians, including 10 UN staff, died. During the 2014 Israel-Gaza conflict, many Palestinians fled their homes after warnings by Israel or due to air strikes or fighting in the area. An estimated 290,000 people (15% of Gaza's population) took shelter in UNRWA schools.

On three occasions, on 16 July, 22 July and on 29 July, UNRWA announced that rockets had been found in their schools. UNRWA denounced the groups responsible for "flagrant violations of the neutrality of its premises". All of these schools were vacant at the time when rockets were discovered; no rockets were found in any shelters which were shelled. The Israel Defense Forces (IDF) stated that "Hamas chooses where these battles are conducted and, despite Israel's best efforts to prevent civilian casualties, Hamas is ultimately responsible for the tragic loss of civilian life. There has been repeated abuse of UN facilities by Hamas, with at least three cases of munitions storage within such facilities."

The attacks were condemned by members of the UN (UNRWA's parent organization) and other governments, such as the U.S., have expressed "extreme concern" over the safety of Palestinian civilians who "are not safe in UN-designated shelters." The Rafah shelling in particular was widely criticized, with Ban Ki-moon calling it a "moral outrage and a criminal act" and US State Department calling it "appalling" and "disgraceful". UN High Commissioner for Human Rights Navi Pillay said that both Hamas militants and Israel might have committed war crimes. A Human Rights Watch investigation into three of the incidents concluded that Israel committed war crimes because two of the shellings "did not appear to target a military objective or were otherwise indiscriminate", while the third Rafah shelling was "unlawfully disproportionate". On 27 April 2015, the United Nations released an inquiry which concluded that Israel was responsible for the deaths of at least 44 Palestinians who died in the shelling and 227 were injured.

==== Infrastructure ====
On 23 July, twelve human rights organizations in Israel released a letter to the Israeli government warning that "Gaza Strip's civilian infrastructure is collapsing". They wrote that "due to Israel's ongoing control over significant aspects of life in Gaza, Israel has a legal obligation to ensure that the humanitarian needs of the people of Gaza are met and that they have access to adequate supplies of water and electricity." They note that many water and electricity systems were damaged during the conflict, which has led to a "pending humanitarian and environmental catastrophe". The Sydney Morning Herald reported that "almost every piece of critical infrastructure, from electricity to water to sewage, has been seriously compromised by either direct hits from Israeli air strikes and shelling or collateral damage."

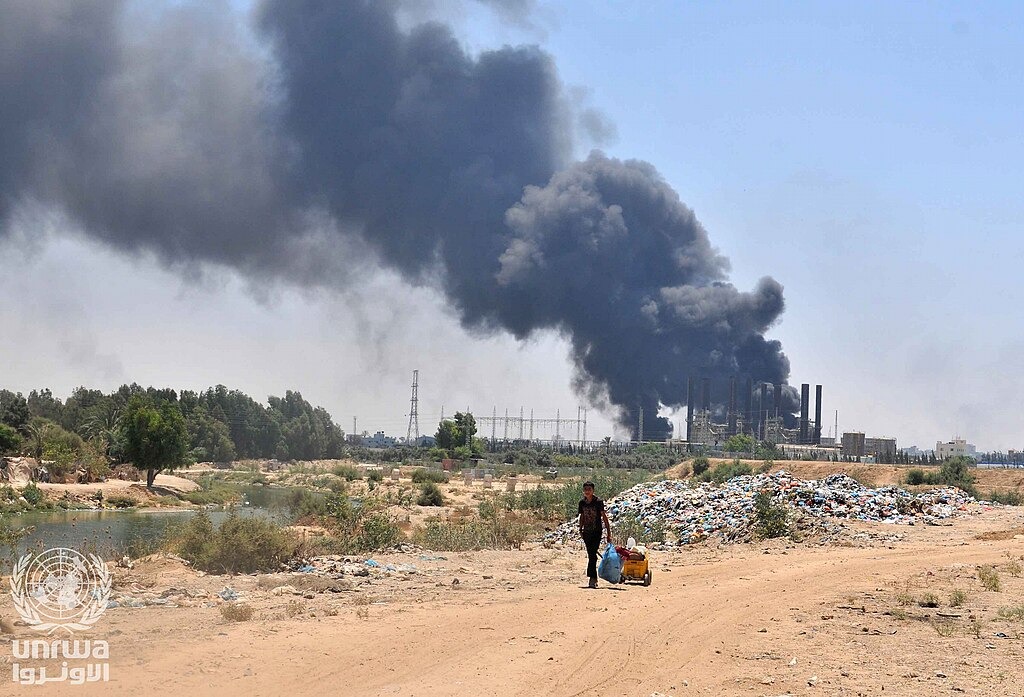
The only power plant of Gaza after it was attacked by the Israeli army on July 14, 2014

Between five and eight of the 10 power lines that bring electricity from Israel were disabled, at least three by Hamas rocket fire. On 29 July, Israel was reported to bomb Gaza's only power plant, which was estimated to take a year to repair. Amnesty International said the crippling of the power station amounted to "collective punishment of Palestinians". Human Rights Watch has stated that "[d]amaging or destroying a power plant, even if it also served a military purpose, would be an unlawful disproportionate attack under the laws of war". Israel immediately denied damaging the power plant, stating there was "no indication that [IDF] were involved in the strike ... The area surrounding the plant was also not struck in recent days." Contradicting initial reports that it would take a year to repair, the power plant resumed operation on 27 October.

==== Attacks on journalists ====
17 journalists were killed in the conflict, of which five were off-duty and two (from Associated Press) were covering a bomb disposal team's efforts to defuse an unexploded Israeli artillery shell when it exploded. In several cases, the journalists were killed while having markings distinguishing them as press on their vehicles or clothing. IDF stated that in one case it had precise information that a vehicle marked "TV" that was hit killing one alleged journalist was in military use. Several media outlets, including the offices of Al-Jazeera, were hit. The International Federation of Journalists has condemned the attacks as "appalling murders and attacks". Journalists are considered civilians and should not be targeted under international humanitarian law. The Israeli army said it does not target journalists, and that it contacts news media "in order to advise them which areas to avoid during the conflict". Israel has made foreign journalists sign a waiver stating that it is not responsible for their safety in Gaza, which Reporters Without Borders calls contrary to international law. The Director-General of UNESCO, Irina Bokova, who in August 2014 condemned the killing of Al Aqsa TV journalist Abdullah Murtaja, withdrew her comments after it was revealed that Murtaja was also a combatant in Hamas's Al Qassam Brigade, and said she "deplore[d] attempts to instrumentalize the profession of journalists by combatants"

ITIC published a report analyzing a list of 17 names published by Wafa News Agency based on information originating from Hamas-controlled Gaza office of the ministry of information that supposedly belong to journalists killed in the operation. The report says that 8 of the names belong to Hamas or Islamic Jihad operatives, or employees of the Hamas media.

Israel bombed Hamas's Al-Aqsa radio and TV stations because of their "propaganda dissemination capabilities used to broadcast the messages of (Hamas's) military wing." Reporters Without Borders and Al-Haq condemned the attacks, saying "an expert committee formed by the International Criminal Court's prosecutor for the former Yugoslavia, to assess the NATO bombing campaign of 1999, specified that a journalist or media organization is not a legitimate target merely because it broadcasts or disseminates propaganda." The U.S. government classifies Al-Aqsa TV as being controlled by Hamas, a "Specially Designated Global Terrorist," and states that it "will not distinguish between a business financed and controlled by a terrorist group, such as Al-Aqsa Television, and the terrorist group itself."

==== Human shields ====
The UN High Commissioner for Human Rights Navi Pillay accused Israel of having "defied international law by attacking civilian areas of Gaza such as schools, hospitals, homes and U.N. facilities. "None of this appears to me to be accidental," Pillay said. "They appear to be defying – deliberate defiance of – obligations that international law imposes on Israel."" The Jaffa based NGO Physicians for Human Rights stated in a report in January 2015 that the IDF had used human shields during the war. IDF criticized the report's conclusions and methodology which "cast a heavy shadow over its content and credibility". Defense for Children International-Palestine reported that 17-year-old Ahmad Abu Raida was kidnapped by Israeli soldiers who, after beating him up, used him as a human shield for five days, forcing him to walk in front of them with police dogs at gunpoint, search houses and dig in places soldiers suspected there might be tunnels. Several of the key claims could not be verified because his Hamas-employed father said he forgot to take photographs of the alleged abuse marks and discarded all the clothing IDF soldiers supposedly provided Abu Raida when he was freed.

The IDF confirmed that the troops suspected Ahmad of being a militant based on the affiliation of his father (a senior official in Gaza's Tourism Ministry) with Hamas and so detained him during the ground operation. The IDF and Israeli authorities challenged the credibility of DCI-P noting their "scant regard for truth". The IDF Military Advocate General opened criminal investigation into the event.

== Military operations, weaponry and techniques ==
=== Gaza ===
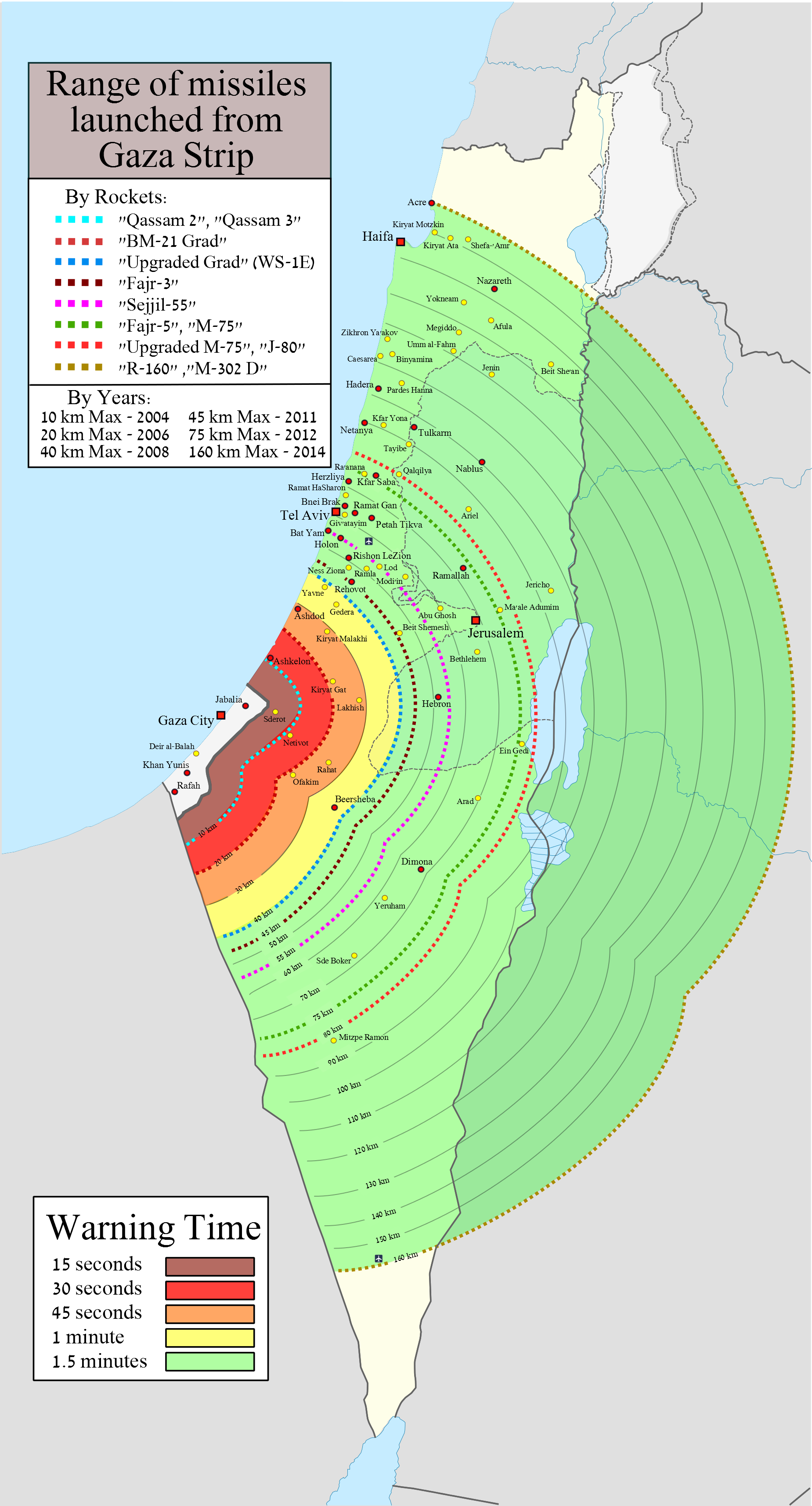
Range of rockets launched from Gaza Strip

Palestinian militants with rockets

==== Rockets ====
The Gazan militants used different kinds of rockets, including the Syrian-made (Chinese-designed) M-302 and the locally made M-75, which had the range to hit Tel-Aviv. Other rockets include the Soviet Katyushas and Qassams. The Israeli Defense Force reported that at the beginning of the 2014 conflict, Hamas had close to 6,000 rockets in its possession. This included 1,000 self-produced short range rockets (15–20 km range), 2,500 smuggled short range rockets, 200 self-made Grad rockets, and 200 smuggled Grad rockets. In addition, to these short range rockets, Hamas held an assortment of mid and long range rockets, both self-made and smuggled, that totaled over several thousand.

According to the Fars News Agency, Fajr-5 (long range Iranian) rockets had a warhead of 150–200 kg. According to Theodore Postol, the vast majority of Gazan artillery rocket warheads contained 10- to 20-pound explosive loads. Postol stated that this fact made bomb shelters more effective for protection. Mark Perry stated that the "vast majority of the rockets are unsophisticated Qassams, with a 10–20 kg warhead and no guidance system" and that "Hamas' arsenal is considerably weaker today than it was in 2012". Regarding the Fajr-5, he stated that Iran had not transferred full-fledged rockets to Hamas, it has only transferred technology to manufacture them. He also stated that "its guidance system was crude, at best, and its warhead nearly non-existent."

The UNHRC, quoting Amnesty International, stated that armed groups in Gaza have used BM-21 Grad rockets with ranges varying from 20 km to 48 km, in addition to locally produced rockets reaching as far as 80 km, such as the M-75 and J-80. The majority of the rockets had no guidance system. Mortars having a range of up to 8 km, have been actively used along the Green Line. Other weapons included rocket-propelled grenades, home-made drones, SA 7 Grail anti-aircraft missiles, Kornet 9M133 anti-tank guided missiles, and a wide array of small arms, rifles, machine guns and hand grenades.

According to the IDF, of all the 4,564 projectiles fired at Israel, 224 hit built-up areas, 735 were intercepted by the Iron Dome, 875 fell inside Gaza and the rest fell in open territory or failed to launch.

According to OCHA, Palestinian militants fired 4,844 rockets and 1,734 mortar shells towards Israel. 25% of Gazan rockets had sufficient effectiveness to threaten to reach populated areas.

==== Gazan tunnels ====
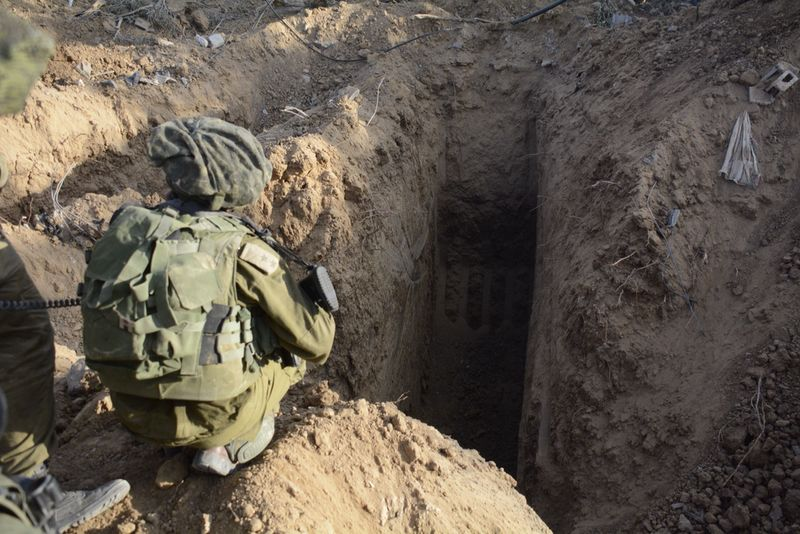
An Israeli soldier overlooking an uncovered Palestinian tunnel in the Gaza Strip during 2014 Gaza War

A vast network of underground tunnels used for warfare and to avoid Israeli airstrikes exists in the Gaza Strip. This infrastructure runs throughout the Gaza Strip and towards Egypt and Israel, and has been developed by Hamas and other Palestinian military organizations to facilitate the storing and shielding of weapons; the gathering and moving of fighters, including for training and communication purposes; the launching of offensive attacks against Israel; and the transportation of Israeli hostages. On several occasions, Palestinian militants have also used this tunnel network, which is colloquially referred to as the Gaza metro,‌ to infiltrate Israel and Egypt while masking their presence and activities within the Gaza Strip itself. According to Iranian military officer Hassan Hassanzadeh, who commanded the Islamic Revolutionary Guard Corps from Tehran, the Gaza Strip's tunnels run for more than 500 kilometres (310 mi) throughout the territory.

==== Other weaponry ====
Hamas has also used a "crude, tactical" drone, reported to be Iranian-made and named "Ababil-1".

Palestinian militant groups have also used anti-tank rockets against armoured vehicles, as well as against groups of Israeli soldiers. Some armored personnel carriers were hit by missiles, and the Israeli Trophy system reportedly intercepted at least 15 anti-tank missiles shot at Merkava IV tanks. Anti-tank mines had also been used against armored vehicles.

=== Israel ===
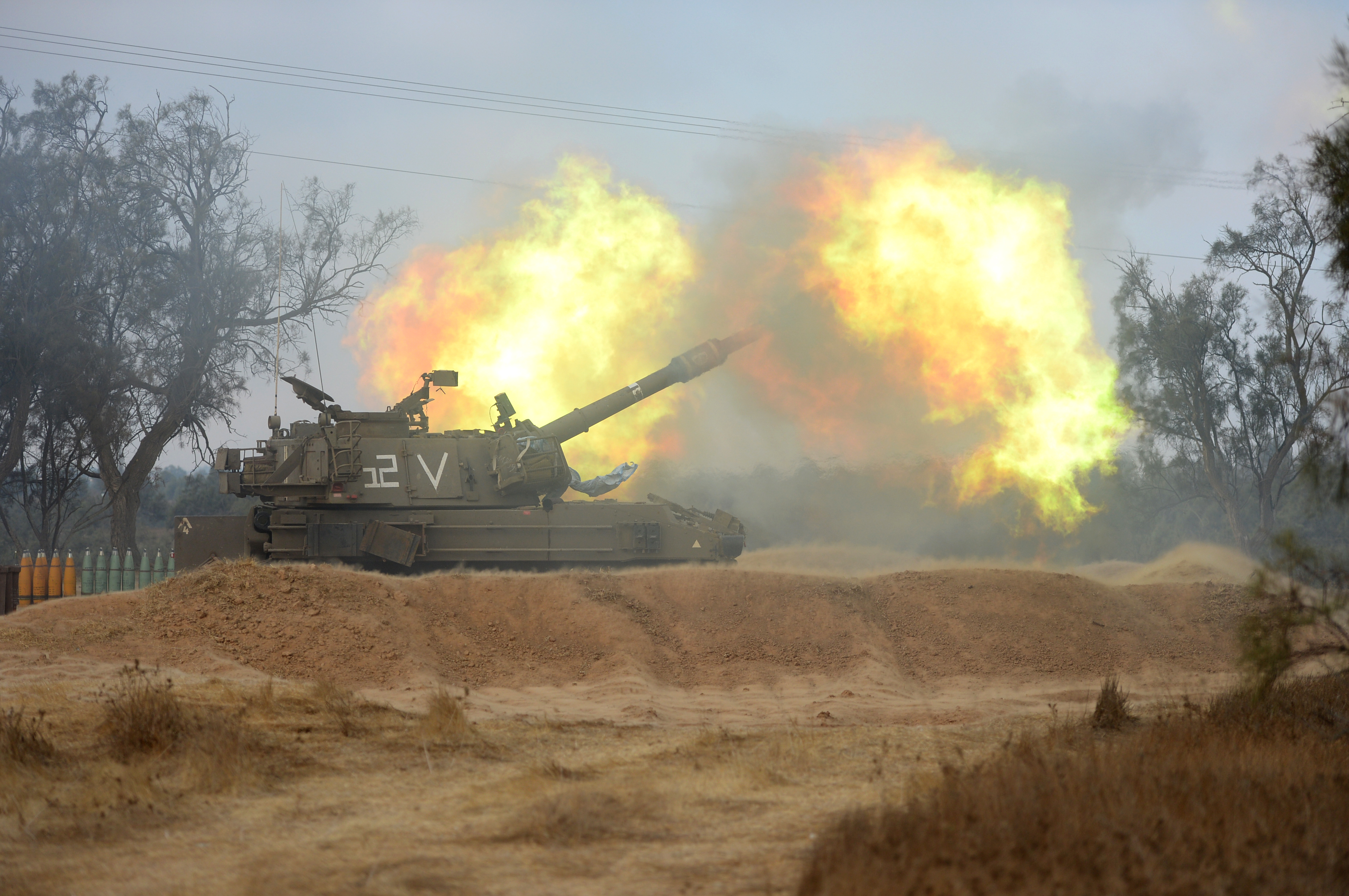
IDF Artillery Corps fires a 155 mm M109 howitzer, 24 July 2014.

Israel used air, land and naval weaponry. The artillery includes Soltam M71 guns and US-manufactured Paladin M109s (155-mm howitzers). The aerial weaponry includes drones and F-16 fighter jets. Drones are used to constantly monitor the Gaza strip. The IDF fired 14,500 tank shells and 35,000 other artillery shells during the conflict.

The IDF stated that it attacked 5,263 targets in Gaza, including:

- 1,814 rocket and mortar launch or otherwise related sites
- 191 weapon factories and warehouses
- 1,914 command and control centers
- 237 government institutions supporting the militant activity
- hundreds of military outposts inside buildings

According to OCHA figures, Israel fired 5,830 missiles in 4,028 IAF air raids, the IDF's ground forces shot off 16,507 artillery and tank projectiles, and the Israeli navy's off-shore fleet fired 3,494 naval shells, into the Gaza Strip.

Overall, Israel fired 34,000 unguided shells into Gaza. Of these 19,000 were high-explosive artillery shells, marking a 533% rise in the launching of artillery ordnance compared to Operation Cast Lead. Shelling of civilian areas with 155 mm (6.1 in) shells using Doher howitzers, with a kill radius of 150 yards (140 m), also increased.

According to Palestinian authorities, 8,000 bombs and 70,000 artillery shells, or 20,000 tons of explosives (the equivalent of two low-yield tactical nuclear weapons), had been dropped on Gaza. The Sydney Morning Herald quoted an anonymous expert who estimated that 10,000 tonnes of explosives were dropped from the air alone, which does not include tank and artillery shells.

Between 32 and 34 known tunnels were destroyed or neutralized, 13 of them destroyed completely.

The performance of the Iron Dome defense system was considered effective, achieving an almost 90% success rate. Israel's early warning sirens and extensive shelters have been an effective defense against Gazan rocketry. They are less effective against short-range mortars because the residents have less time to react.

== Media and diplomacy ==
=== Media coverage ===
Portrayals of the conflict in different media outlets varied. U.S. news sources were often more sympathetic to Israel while British news sources featured more criticism of Israel. Commentators on both sides claimed that the media was biased either for or against Israel. According to an article by Subrata Ghoshroy published in the Bulletin of the Atomic Scientists, most United States media focused on Hamas rockets, of which only 3% actually strike populated areas (causing little damage), with less attention paid to Palestinian casualties, or to why Gazans back Hamas's rocket campaign. As the conflict progressed and Palestinian deaths increased, British media became somewhat more critical of Israel. Within Israel, the newspaper Haaretz issued an editorial stating that the "soft Gaza sand... could turn into quicksand" for the Israeli military and also warned about the "wholesale killing" of Palestinian civilians; the article declared: "There can be no victory here". The Sydney Morning Herald apologised for running an allegedly antisemitic cartoon after Australian Attorney-General George Brandis denounced it as "deplorable." Israel was accused of waging a propaganda war, and on both sides, sympathetic authors released video games relating to the conflict. In Israel, according to Naomi Chazan, the Gaza war sparked "an equally momentous conflagration at the heart of Israeli society": attempts to question government policy were met with severe verbal and physical harassment, incidents of Arab-bashing occurred daily, and 90% of internet posts on the war were found to be racist or to constitute incitement.

=== Diplomatic efforts ===
A number of diplomatic efforts were made to resolve the conflict. These attempts included efforts by United States Secretary of State John Kerry to broker a ceasefire between Israel and Hamas, like the meeting in Paris with European G4 foreign ministers and his counterparts of Qatar and Turkey. Egypt brokered a number of ceasefires between Hamas and Israel.

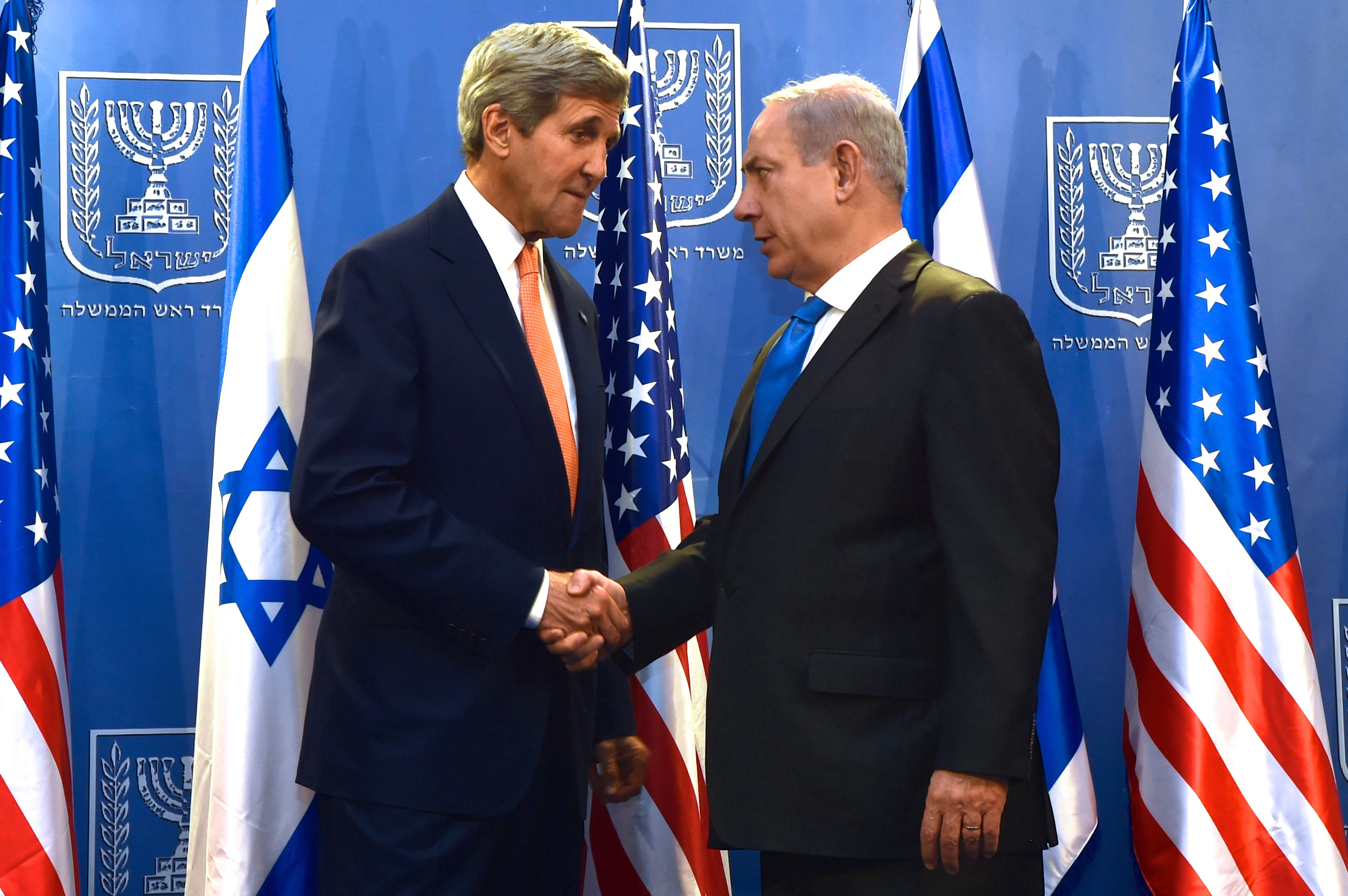
U.S. Secretary of State John Kerry and Benjamin Netanyahu, Tel Aviv, 23 July 2014.

=== Israeli public diplomacy ===
==== Hamas is ISIS ====
"Hamas is ISIS" was first asserted by Benjamin Netanyahu near the end of the 2014 Gaza War. The comparison was criticized and mocked by some Israeli journalists. Netanyahu was particularly criticised for including real ISIS propaganda in his social media posts promoting the "Hamas is ISIS" analogy, including photos of James Foley from an ISIS beheading video.

Neyanyahu followed this by saying, "Hamas is ISIS and ISIS is Hamas", in a 2014 speech at the United Nations. In reference to this, the head of the Department of Political Science at Hebron University, said it was "dangerous" to conflate Hamas and ISIS. Israeli journalists pointed out that Hamas more closely resemble the Irgun and Lehi more closely than Hamas resemble ISIS.

Netanyahu resurrected this slogan a decade later. In the first days of the Israeli bombing of the Gaza Strip in October 2023, The Jerusalem Post quoted Benjamin Netanyahu saying, "They are savages. Hamas is ISIS", the article then highlighted some alleged similarities in the groups' influences identified by Dr. Harel Chorev (from the Moshe Dayan Center for Middle Eastern Studies at Tel Aviv University). Netanyahu included this assertion in a public addresses in the United States made alongside Secretary Antony J. Blinken, in the first week of the Israeli bombing of the Gaza Strip. Netanyahu said, "Hamas is ISIS, and just as ISIS was crushed, so too will Hamas be crushed". Then in 2024, Netanyahu was using the spurious analogy to suggest that a global coalition resembling the War against the Islamic State.

International military experts and mainstream international media pointed out major differences, particularly relating to nationalism, Shia Islam, Christianity, democracy, and destruction of cultural heritage. ISIS want a purely theocratic system of government without any element of democracy, and ISIS violently attack Christians, whereas Hamas participated in the 2006 Palestinian legislative election and the Hamas-led electoral list that won the election included a Palestinian Christian running for the Christian reserved seat in Gaza City. Talal Abu Zarifa, a leader from the DFLP (a secular faction allied to Hamas), said Israel was using the comparison to "justify its annihilation of Palestinian people and bloodshed". A few commentators pointed out some commonalities, such as that both are on the list of designated terrorist groups in the United States, and United Kingdom, but still stressed the groups' very different ideological goals. Only a few pro-government Israeli sources agreed that Hamas and ISIS are comparable.

== Efforts to reconstruct Gaza ==
An international conference took place on 12 October 2014 in Cairo, where donors pledged US$5.4 billion to the Palestinians with half of that sum being "dedicated" to the reconstruction of Gaza, which was more than the US$4 billion Abbas first sought. Japan pledged US$100 million in January 2015. The EU pledged €450 million to rebuilding Gaza.

As of 1 February 2015, only US$125 million of the $2.7 billion for reconstruction had been paid out, while tens of thousands of Gazans were still homeless. In February 2015, 30 international aid organizations including UNRWA, the World Health Organization as well as NGOs such as Oxfam, ActionAid and Save the Children International released a statement saying that: "we are alarmed by the limited progress in rebuilding the lives of those affected and tackling the root causes of the conflict." They stated that "Israel, as the occupying power, is the main duty bearer and must comply with its obligations under international law. In particular, it must fully lift the blockade within the framework of United Nations Security Council Resolution 1860 (2009)". Catherine Weibel, UNICEF's Communication Chief in Jerusalem said: "Four infants died from complications caused by the bitter cold in Gaza in January... All were from families whose houses were destroyed during the last conflict and were living in extremely dire conditions."

Only one percent of the needed building material had been delivered. The mechanism agreed between Hamas and the Palestinian Authority, meant to allow delivery of such material, has not worked.

Hamas spokesman blamed Israel for causing an electricity crisis. Israel provided 50,000 liters of fuel for generators running during blackouts and repaired three power lines damaged during storms within a week.

On 15 September 2014, a Fatah spokesperson accused Hamas of misappropriating US$700 million of funds intended to rebuild Gaza. On 6 January Hamas spokesperson said that Palestinian national consensus government ministers admitted redirecting rebuilding funds to PNA budget. Israel's military estimated that 20% of cement and steel allowed by Israel to be delivered to Gaza for the reconstruction efforts were taken by Hamas. Arne Gericke, a member of the European Parliament said "It would sicken most [European] taxpayers to know that the EU itself could be directly contributing to the tragic cycle of violence".

== See also ==
- 2014 in Israel
- 2014 in the State of Palestine
- 2014 Jerusalem unrest
- Asymmetric warfare
- List of the Israel Defense Forces operations
- List of wars: 2003–present
- List of wars involving Israel
- List of wars involving the State of Palestine
- Military operations of the Israeli–Palestinian conflict
- Timeline of the Israeli–Palestinian conflict in 2014
- Zanana
