= International reactions to the 2014 Gaza War =

Reactions to the 2014 Gaza War came from around the world.

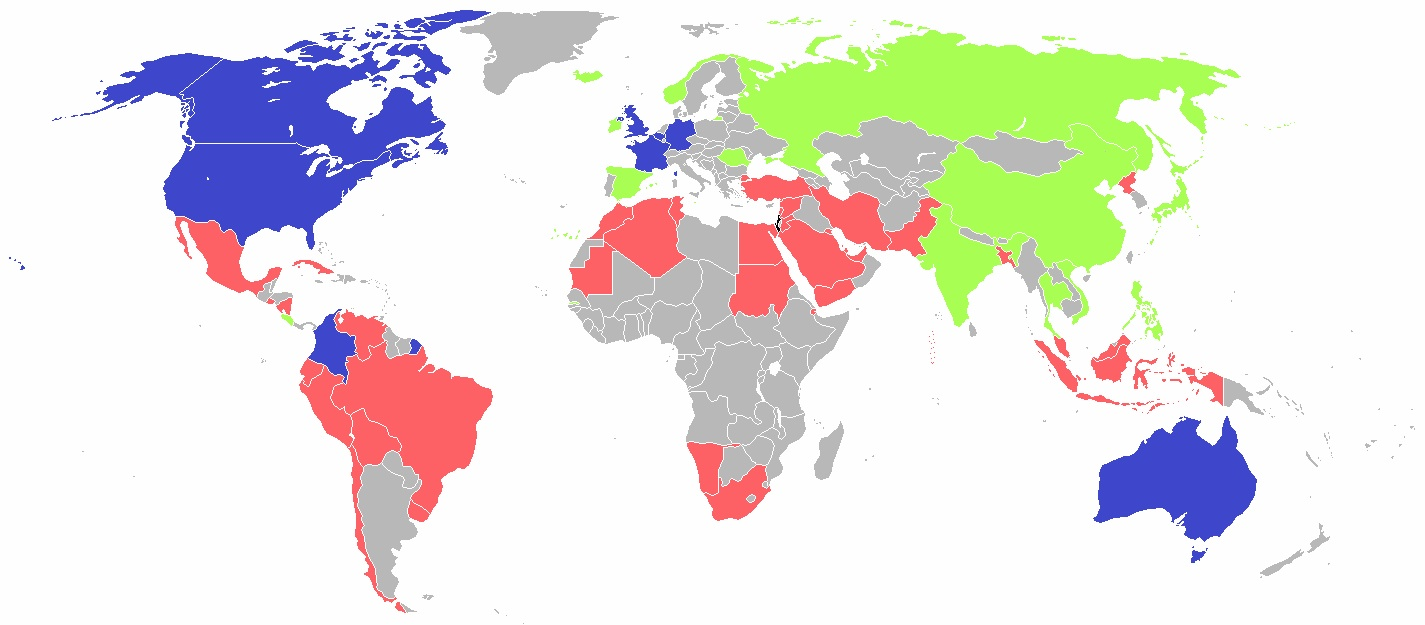
Governmental proclamations to the 2014 Gaza War Israel and Gaza Strip States who supported Israel States who called for an end to hostilities States who condemned Israel

The United States and Canada were supportive of Israel and critical of Hamas. The BRICS countries called for restraint on both sides and a return to peace talks based on the Arab Peace Initiative. The European Union condemned the violations of the laws of war by both sides, while stressing the "unsustainable nature of the status quo", and calling for a settlement based on the two-state solution. The Non-Aligned Movement, the Arab League, and most Latin American countries were critical of Israel, with some countries in the latter group withdrawing their ambassadors from Israel in protest. South Africa called for restraint by both sides and an end to "collective punishment of Palestinians".

Pro-Palestine and pro-Israel demonstrations took place throughout the world and in Israel and the Palestinian territories. According to OCHA, during demonstrations, 23 Palestinians were killed and 2,218 were wounded by the IDF, 38% of the latter by live fire.

Rising anti-Semitism and anti-Semitic violence broke out concurrent to, and in many cases, directly related to the conflict. The UN Secretary-General and many European leaders condemned the phenomenon.

The United Nations Human Rights Council announced a panel headed by William Schabas to investigate accusations of war crimes by both sides. Major human rights organizations including Amnesty International and Human Rights Watch condemned human rights violations by both sides and called for an arms embargo for the region.

Commercial airlines in several countries banned flights to Israel because of safety concerns. The restrictions were later lifted.

After the 26 August ceasefire, the Palestinian Center for Policy and Survey Research polled the West Bank and the Gaza Strip. 79% of respondents said that Hamas had won the war and 61% said that they would pick Hamas leader Ismail Haniyeh as the Palestinian president, up from 41% before the war.

== Official reactions ==
=== Supranational bodies ===
- ALBA – In a statement ALBA condemned Israeli attacks and added that the offensive violates even the most minimum standards of international humanitarian law by indiscriminately attacking civilians. It also offered "its unconditional solidarity, support and sympathy to the people of Palestine against the new wave of violence."
- Arab League – AL's representatives condemned Israeli air raids and asked the United Nations Security Council (UNSC) to hold an emergency meeting. Secretary General Nabil Elaraby condemned the Israeli attacks in Shejaia. In a statement, the organisation said: "El-Araby...considered Israel's terrible shelling and ground attack operations in the neighborhood of Shejaia as a war crime against Palestinian civilians and a dangerous escalation."
- BRICS- A declaration at the 6th BRICS summit in Brazil called upon Israel and Palestine to end the conflict and resume negotiations leading to a peaceful two-State solution. It also called upon UNSC to fully exercise its functions under the United Nations Charter with regard to the conflict.
- Gulf Cooperation Council – Secretary-General Abdullatif bin Rashid Al Zayani condemned Israel for its repressive and vengeful policies which "represent a blatant violation of the Palestinians' inalienable rights and a flagrant affront to the [sic] international laws." He also described the assault as "reflecting Israel's rejection of the peace process" and called upon the international community and UNSC to "assume their responsibilities and act quickly to protect the Palestinian people and put an end to the brutal Israeli shelling of Gaza Strip."
- European Union – "The EU strongly condemns the indiscriminate firing of rockets into Israel by Hamas and militant groups... All terrorist groups in Gaza must disarm. The EU condemns calls on the civilian population of Gaza to provide themselves as human shields, and the loss of hundreds of civilian lives, among them many women and children...While recognizing Israel's legitimate right to defend itself against any attacks, the EU underlines that the Israeli military operation must be proportionate and in line with international humanitarian law..."is particularly appalled by the human cost" of the operation in Shejaia and was "deeply concerned at the rapidly deteriorating humanitarian situation...This tragic escalation of hostilities confirms again the unsustainable nature of the status quo with regard to the situation in the Gaza Strip."
- Non-Aligned Movement – NAM and President of Iran Hassan Rouhani condemned the Israeli air strikes and called on international bodies to force Israel to stop raids on civilians. "[The] siege of Gaza Strip must be fully and immediately lifted and humanitarian aids must be forwarded to the Palestinians in need of them there."
- UN – UNSC called for de-escalation, restoration of the 2012 ceasefire, respect for international law and resumption of direct negotiations between both the parties. High Commissioner for Human Rights Navi Pillay stated that reports of attacks on homes raise doubts about whether Israeli attacks are legal under international law. She also called for an investigation into the Israeli air strikes.

=== States ===
==== Involved parties ====
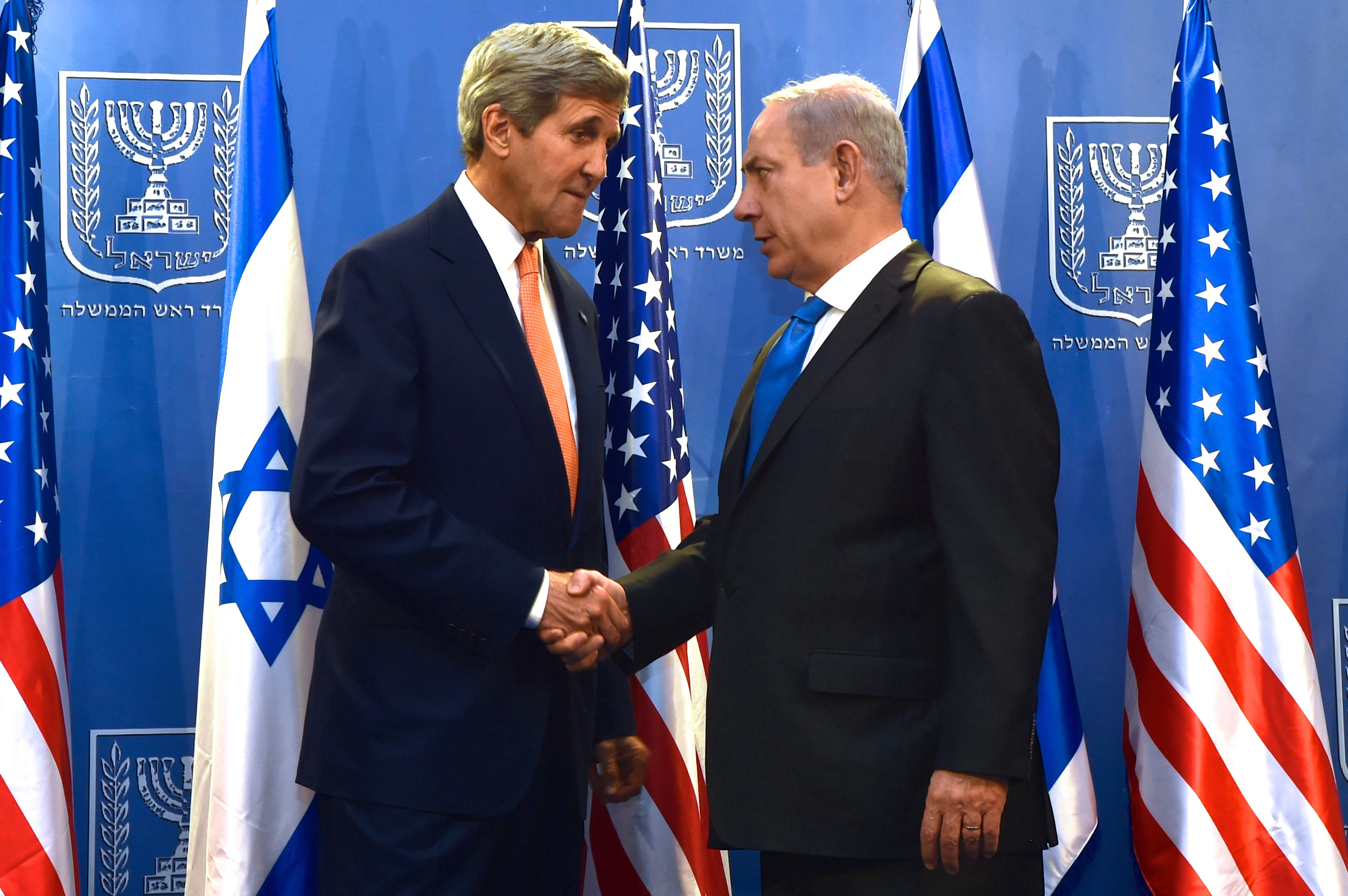
U.S. Secretary of State John Kerry and Benjamin Netanyahu, Tel Aviv, 23 July 2014

- Israel – On 11 July, Prime Minister Benjamin Netanyahu rejected the criticism of international and local human rights groups and promised to continue the attacks. He declared: "No international pressure will prevent Israel from continuing its operation in Gaza ... The leaders of Hamas are hiding behind the citizens of Gaza, and they are responsible for all casualties."
  - The IDF spokesman's office tweeted when the operation began that the "IDF has commenced Operation Protective Edge in Gaza against Hamas, in order to stop the terror Israel's citizens face on a daily basis."
- Palestinian Authority – On 8 July Palestinian government spokesman Nabil Abu Rudeineh said the operation was "a declaration of war on Palestinians". Protesting what he described as a massacre of innocents, he added that "Palestinians have the right to defend themselves by all legitimate means."
  - Khalil al-Haya, Palestinian negotiator said "It was a war of necessity not a war of choice. We had no choice but to defend ourselves,". He further said "We are united and are unified in blood and dead bodies. We are one front, one side, one body ... We are all engaged in one battle defending our people. The war is the beginning of liberation."

==== International ====
- Algeria – On 16 July, Foreign Minister Ramtane Lamamra urged the international community to act to get Israel to immediately cease its attacks and respect the truce from November 2012. "While condemning in the strongest terms the barbaric attacks against the defenceless Palestinian people, we believe that these attacks were encouraged by the complacent silence of the international community to Israeli expansionist policies and their negative impact on peace and security in the region," Lamamra said. He also underlined the need for urgent action within the United Nations.
- Argentina – On 20 July, the Foreign Ministry condemned the violence, while speaking out against the acts committed by both sides in the conflict. "Once more, and for the third time in less than six years, civilian populations have been trapped in the middle of armed actions from Hamas and the disproportionate, excessive use of military force by Israel. Argentina sends a profound, pained tribute to all of the children that have been killed in the last few weeks. We vigorously condemn Israel, defying calls from the Security Council, the Secretary General and many other voices from the international community, for having decided to escalate the crisis launching a ground offensive. This decision will only create further instability in the region, more victims and more suffering. At the same time, we condemn the continued and indiscriminate launch of rockets from Gaza to Israeli cities." Soon afterwards, Argentina's representative at the U.N. Security Council, Maria Cristina Perceval, reiterated the position, condemning Israel's "indiscriminate abuse of militarism" and "disproportionate use of force."
- Bangladesh – On 12 July, the Foreign Ministry issued a statement that strongly condemned the "Israeli aggression" and called for an immediate cessation of atrocities on Gaza civilians. The statement also said that they were shocked at the recent Israeli violence.
- Bahrain – On 10 July, The Kingdom of Bahrain condemned the latest Israeli escalation and repeated its rejection of violence and the need to stop all military operations. The Kingdom advised the international community to compel Israel to comply with international law and end its violations. They also stressed their full support and solidarity with the Palestinian people.
- Belgium – On 22 July, in a statement Belgian Prime Minister Elio Di Rupo stated "Although I accept Israel's legitimate security measures, I also condemn the completely disproportionate use of force by the Israeli military, including the attack on the neighborhood of Shujaya."
- Bolivia – On 10 July, the Bolivian Foreign Ministry condemned the Israeli offensive and called on Jerusalem to cease hostilities. The Foreign Ministry also called on the international community to intervene to stop "the genocide" and stressed that "should respect and comply with international agreements and treaties." On 31 July Bolivian President Evo Morales declared Israel a "terrorist state".
- Bosnia and Herzegovina – Republika Srpska leader Milorad Dodik expressed his support for Israel and the Jewish people. He stated that the Republika Srpska was closely following events, that it supported Israel's right to protect its citizens and property and defend itself from "terrorist threats and the actions of Islamist militant groups". Bakir Izetbegović, the Bosniak member of the Presidency of Bosnia and Herzegovina, called for an end to conflict and wished for "the peaceful co-existence of all inhabitants of Gaza and other places". He stated that Gaza "was for many years a target of Israeli attack" and warned that the world was "becoming used to violence perpetrated by Israel".
- Brazil – On 17 July, the Federal government of Brazil released a statement condemning the Israeli bombing as a disproportionate use of force that had resulted in civilian deaths. It recalled its ambassador in protest. Brazil's Special Advisor for International Relations was quoted saying "For the love of God, what we have here is genocide, a massacre, to the point where top UN officials are starting to talk about war crimes".
- Canada – Prime Minister Stephen Harper expressed support for Israel and condemned Hamas. Harper said "It is evident that Hamas is deliberately using human shields to further terror in the region." Foreign Minister John Baird also condemned Hamas' rocket attacks against Israel. Baird added that the attacks "prove that Hamas continues to target innocent civilians," and that "Canada believes that Israel has every right to defend itself from such belligerent acts of terrorism."
- Chile – The Foreign Ministry complained that Israeli bombing had caused a number of fatalities, including civilians, women and children. "The condemned kidnappings and deaths of three young Israeli and Palestinian youth can not be an excuse to launch actions nor to attack densely populated by civilians". Chile called on all actors in the conflict to "establish a truce and respect international humanitarian law" and endorsed the words of the United Nations Secretary General, Ban Ki-moon, who urged a solution. On 29 July, the Chilean government recalled its ambassador and criticized Israeli operations, which it considered a violation of "the principle of proportionality in the use of force, an essential requirement to justify self-defense".
- Costa Rica – On 11 July, the Costa Rican Foreign Ministry deplored the escalation and was particularly concerned about the impact on civilians and the risk of escalation. "The Government of Costa Rica condemns the rocket attacks launched by Palestinian militants from the Gaza Strip into Israeli territory, and likewise, the military operations of the Defence Forces towards reaching Gaza Strip, causing deaths and damage to civilians."
- Cuba – The Foreign Ministry condemned "Israel's attack against the population of the Gaza Strip" and accused Israel of using its military and technological superiority to execute a policy of collective punishment with disproportionate use of force, which causes the death of civilians and material damage.
- Czech Republic – On 15 July, Czech Republic Foreign Ministry released a statement as follows: "The Ministry of Foreign Affairs of the Czech Republic welcomed the truce initiative that aimed to restore calm in Gaza and appreciates the constructive role played by Egypt. The Czech Republic regrets the failure of this initiative in spite of its previous acceptance by Israel. We urge Hamas and other militant groups in Gaza to immediately stop attacking Israeli territory in order to allow the implementation of the cease fire. The Czech Republic recognizes that the people of Israel as well as the people of Gaza have the right to live in peace and security. However, we are extremely concerned about the disastrous impact of the current situation on civilians, who are endangered the most by the conflict. While recognizing the right of Israel to take appropriate measure to protect its population, we strongly regret the Palestinian civilian casualties, in particular children, caused by the recent crisis."
- Djibouti – On 10 July, Djibouti "condemned the Israeli aggression against the Gaza Strip." Djibouti held Israel responsible for a "dangerous escalation of violence" and called on the international community to end Israel's "blind and intolerable repression."
- Ecuador – On 12 July, the Ministry of Foreign Affairs issued a statement that condemned Israeli aggression against the Palestinian people and demanded the end of attacks against the civilian population. "The Government of Ecuador strongly condemns the disproportionate military operations by the Israeli army against the civilian population of the Gaza Strip, which have left more than a hundred casualties," the official statement said.
- Egypt – Egyptian FM Sameh Shoukry made remarks following a meeting with his Jordanian counterpart where he said it was important to address the crisis in a manner that protects the Palestinians and their interests.

On 11 July, the Foreign Ministry then criticised the Israel Defense Forces (IDF) operation in Gaza as "oppressive policies of mass punishment. Egypt rejects the irresponsible Israeli escalation in the occupied Palestinian territory, which comes in the form of excessive and unnecessary use of military force leading to the death of innocent civilians." It demanded Israel adopt self-restraint and keep in mind that as an "occupation force", it had a legal and moral duty to protect civilian lives. They urged world powers to intervene and stop the crisis and that its ceasefire efforts had been met with "obstinacy and stubbornness". The same day, Egypt informed authorities in Gaza that it had closed the Rafah Border Crossing after re-opening it the previous day to receive injured Palestinians for medical treatment. This comes after Egyptian forces seized 20 Grad rockets being smuggled from Gaza to Sinai after clashing with militants in Rafah, Egypt. However, shortly after the closure, President Abdel Fattah el-Sisi ordered the Egyptian military to transport 500 tons of food and medical supplies to the Gaza Strip. A military statement stated that Egypt was pursuing its efforts to "stop the Israeli aggression on the Gaza Strip" under the president's supervision.

- El Salvador – On 14 July, the Foreign Ministry called for the "immediate cessation" of the "Armed Israeli aggression against the Gaza Strip". It said that the Israeli Army's action had "caused the loss of lives, hundreds of injuries and the flight of thousands of Palestinians from their homes, as well as serious damage." The note urged "the immediate cessation of armed attacks at the same time asked the United Nations and the actors that have accompanied the parties in finding solutions by means peaceful to intensify their diplomatic actions in the short term."
- Estonia – On 10 July, Foreign Minister Urmas Paet expressed concern about the escalation of tensions and added that "cities and towns shootings [sic] are completely unacceptable. The strained Israeli-Palestinian situation is very worrying and unfortunately, in recent days the situation has not improved, but rather escalated." He added that the parties needed to find a peaceful solution. "We call on the Israeli government and the Palestinian Authority to take all necessary measures to prevent a further escalation of the tense situation."
- France – President Francois Hollande issued a statement that read it "expressed France's solidarity [with Israel] in the face of rocket fire from Gaza" and told Netanyahu, "France strongly condemns these aggressions [by Hamas]." Hollande also said that it was up to Israel "to take all measures to protect its population in the face of threats" but reminded the Israeli premier "of the need to prevent an escalation of violence." On 18 July, French Foreign Minister Laurent Fabius stated that "France is extremely concerned by the Israeli decision to launch a ground offensive in Gaza." On 22 July, Fabius condemned the Gaza "massacres," stating that "nothing justifies continued attacks and massacres which do nothing but only claim more victims and stoke tensions, hatred."
- Gambia – On 16 July, the Gambian Foreign Ministry welcomed the truce brokered by Egypt and called on the parties to fully adhere to the truce. On 29 July, President Yahya Jammeh condemned the "extraordinary brutality" being shown by the Israelis in Gaza, and pointed out that even though "nobody is condemning them, Allah would condemn them". Speaking, during the traditional meeting with Muslim elders after the Eid al Fitr prayer at State House in Banjul, the Gambian leader spoke of "the bad things they are doing in Palestine, in the last ten days of Ramadan". He also lamented the fact that "nobody is saying a word. The white people are engaged in hypocrisy; their media is putting out lies". Citing the fact that the Israelis were bombing hospitals, Jammeh further declared: "This is excessive brutality that we condemn in the strongest terms possible". He also called attention to "the satanic Western media", which had been justifying Israel's actions "because Hamas were firing rockets".
- Georgia – On 10 July, the Ministry of Foreign Affairs blamed Hamas for causing intense armed clashes and expressed concern over the plight of civilians. It also expressed concern over the escalation of tensions and the deteriorating humanitarian situation.
- Germany – Chancellor Angela Merkel telephoned Netanyahu on 9 July to condemn "without reservation rocket fire on Israel".
- Greece – On 13 July, Deputy Prime Minister and Foreign Minister Evangelos Venizelos issued a statement: "We again express our strong concern at the recent developments and the escalation of the situation in Israel and the Gaza Strip. At this time, the absolute priority is the implementation of the ceasefire and a return to the truce of 2012, with the aim of averting a new humanitarian tragedy in the region. Together with the other member states of the European Union, as well as within the framework of the UN, Greece will work in that direction."
- Guatemala – On 14 July, the Ministry of Foreign Affairs expressed its concern at the rapidly deteriorating situation, which led to a "spiral of violence between Palestinians and Israelis." The country called for prudence and responsibility for all international parties and partners so that Hamas ceased firing rockets into Israeli territory, and at the same time ceased attacks against civilians in Gaza."The return of stability is essential to return to the path of negotiations nevertheless, could still lead to a lasting peace based on the two-state solution, living behind secure borders condition".
- Guyana – On 11 July, the Ministry of Foreign Affairs said, "Peace becomes harder to achieve with each military confrontation, each loss of life, and the creation of further mayhem on the ground," the government said; adding that "as a member of the UN Committee on the Exercise of the Inalienable Rights of the Palestinian People and as the first CARICOM country to recognize Palestine as a sovereign state based on its 1967 borders, Guyana supports the Palestinians' aspiration to the full realization of their inalienable rights." The administration supported the peace process and the two-State solution in accordance with the relevant UN resolutions.
- Holy See – Pope Francis called for a cease-fire between Israel and Hamas. He insisted that the joint prayer held on 8 June, with Mahmoud Abbas and Shimon Peres was not in vain.
- Honduras – On 14 July, the Secretariat of State in the Offices of Foreign Affairs and International Cooperation, condemned the violence. They called on the parties to cease hostile actions and demanded a prompt return to dialogue. Finally, it expressed its condolences to victims' families.
- Hungary – On 15 July, Nissim Ben-Shitrit, Hungary's Minister of Foreign Affairs and Trade – Tibor Navracsics, expressed support for the international mediatory efforts to halt the armed conflict and defend the civilian population.
  - On 2 August, the mayor of Érpatak, Mihaly Zoltan Orosz, led a demonstration against what he called the "freemason media" conspiracy to silence the "ongoing genocide" committed by the Israeli military against Hamas in Gaza. After stomping on an Israeli flag (the Star of David in the flag had been replaced with a masonic compass), Orosz condemned both Peres and Netanyahu to death for warcrimes, spreading false notions about the "chosen people", labelled them the Anti-Christ, and laying the groundwork for the Anti-Christ New World Order. He then carried out a symbolic hanging of both Israeli leaders.
- Iceland – On 14 July, Minister of Foreign Affairs Gunnar Bragi Sveinsson called for "the full force" of the UNSC to be used to stop the violence. Sveinsson stated, "I condemn all use of violence in the area... This is an express demand to the Israeli government to stop its attacks on Gaza, which have led to great tragedy for civilians there. In the same spirit, all attacks on Israel need to cease forthwith."
- India – Deputy Chair Kurien refused to bring in a parliament resolution over the matter.
- Indonesia – The Foreign Ministry condemned the ongoing Israeli military aggression in Palestine's Gaza area, saying such an onslaught may ruin conditions towards creation of peace between Palestine and Israel. "Israel's move needs to be opposed. A military aggression that worsens the suffering that has been suffered by Palestinians in Gaza and West Bank until today due to siege which is actually a 'collective punishment' against Palestine people," Said Indonesian Foreign Affairs Minister Marty Natalegawa.
- Iran – Ayatollah Ali Khamenei expressed his deep concern over the bloodshed and criticised the "governments of the United States and the United Kingdom for their continued support for the Zionist regime's military operation against the innocent people." He added that the two states "do not care about the Tel Aviv regime's killings in Gaza Strip and officially support these attacks. The domineering world powers back evil as long as it is in their interest while they confront good savagely." The Foreign Ministry condemned Israel's operation as a "human catastrophe" and demanded that the West halt the conflict.
- Ireland – Foreign Affairs Minister Eamon Gilmore said that he was "gravely concerned at the escalating violence and civilian casualties" and that he "equally condemns" both rocket attacks from Gaza towards Israel and air strikes by the Israeli military. He went on to appeal "to all sides to exercise the utmost restraint, avoid all civilian casualties and negotiate the earliest possible ceasefire." Members of Dáil Éireann stood in silence in the parliament chamber in solidarity with the people of Gaza at the request of Sinn Féin leader Gerry Adams. the Dublin city council passed a motion calling for trade sanctions and an arms embargo on Israel.
- Italy – On 8 July, Minister for Foreign Affairs Federica Mogherini expressed concern over the worsening situation in Israel and the Gaza Strip. "The repeated rocket strikes on Israel warrant the firmest possible condemnation; all attacks on civilian areas must stop immediately. It is of utmost importance to avoid triggering an irreversible spiral that could potentially further destabilise a region already battered by numerous conflicts." She expressed her "deep sorrow" for the deaths of so many civilians, including children in Gaza, and said that "it is now critical to protect civilians, restore calm and resume the peace process."
- Jamaica – On 23 July, Jamaica's Permanent Representative to the United Nations "strongly condemned" Israel's targeting of civilian populations, expressing dismay at the "disproportionate and indiscriminate use of force against an unarmed civilian population that has limited options for shelter."
- Japan – Japan's Foreign Ministry released a press statement expressing concern over the escalation of violence. "Japan is deeply concerned about the situation in which the Israeli Air Force strike has caused civilian casualties in the Gaza Strip and strongly condemns rocket attacks by Palestinian militants in the Gaza Strip against Israel." It urged both sides "to exercise maximum restraint to prevent further civilian casualties. Japan is convinced that the issues of Middle East peace can never be solved through violence but only through negotiations and efforts to build mutual trust among parties to the conflict. Japan calls for all the parties concerned to make the utmost efforts to that end."
- Jordan – Jordanian spokesperson Mohammed Momani described the Israeli military operation in Gaza as "barbaric" and urged Israel to end its aggression.
- Kazakhstan – On 25 July, Kazakhstan's Ministry of Foreign Affairs issued a statement expressing concern over the exacerbation of crisis."Further escalation of violence will result in a destabilization of the situation in the Middle East, and also will blow up efforts of the conflicting parties and the whole international community which are focused on long-term peace making and regional stability," said the statement. "We call on Israelis and Palestinians to take urgent and effective measures to stop bloodshed and resume peace negotiations" it added. Kazakhstan endorsed the agreed-upon steps of the international community, including those under the aegis of the United Nations.
- Kenya – On 21 July, Kenya's Foreign Affairs cabinet Secretary Amina Mohammed said Kenya is a friend to both the Israelis and Palestinians and would like to see a peaceful resolution.
- Kuwait – On 14 July Kuwait's Cabinet reiterated its denunciation of criminal acts and practices committed by Israel. The condemnation came during a weekly cabinet meeting. The cabinet voiced much concern over Israel's continuing air strikes. The Kuwaiti cabinet called on the international community to exert more pressure on the "Israeli entity" to stop its continuing aggression and crimes against humanity. It urged the world to provide international protection for the Palestinian people.
- Lebanon – On 10 July, the Lebanese cabinet condemned Israel's offensive. Minister of Information Ramzi Jreij said "the Lebanese government and its people would show solidarity with the Palestinians in a struggle towards the restoration of their legitimate rights. The ministers also urged the Arab League and the international community to take action in order to halt the "Israeli killing machine."
- Lithuania – On 16 July, President of Lithuania Dalia Grybauskaite expressed "very much concern" about the situation."We want as soon as possible a peaceful solution and real ceasefire on both sides," she told journalists.
- Malaysia – On 9 July, Prime Minister Najib Razak condemned the Israeli air strikes and called for an immediate cessation of military operations. He added "peace can only come with the creation of a viable two-state solution and all parties should adhere to this principle."
- Maldives – On 13 July, the President of Maldives issued a statement that read "during a telephone conversation with Palestinian President Mahmoud Abbas, President Abdulla Yameen said that no nation can truly understand the constant fear and heartbreak that the Palestinian people are subjected to each day. The president further condemned the gross violation of human rights being committed by the Israeli government and said that he will continue to pray for Palestine. President Yameen also assured President Abbas that his government would undertake all efforts to encourage international condemnation of Israeli violence." On 22 July, Maldives announced it would boycott Israeli goods and suspend co-operation agreements on health, culture and education, and tourism until Israel stops its bombardment of Gaza.
- Mali – On 24 July, the Government of Mali declared a national day of mourning for the victims of Gaza, stating its solidarity with the Palestinian people in their struggle for "liberty, dignity, and independence."
- Malta – On 10 July, the Foreign Ministry issued a statement that expressed its regret at the "bloody violence" and declared that it "unreservedly condemned any form of violence. [The] Government firmly believes that violence is never the solution. Rather, it only serves to create even more reprisal and retribution. This, in turn, leads to more hatred, more suffering and more barbaric acts."
- Mauritania – A Ministry of Foreign Affairs and Cooperation stated that it "strongly condemns the brutal military operation launched by Israel against the Palestinian people in the Gaza Strip and confirmed that the policy of repression, torture, destruction and mass murder pursued by Israel against the Palestinian people will have dire consequences for the security and stability of the region and will contribute to undermining the path of peaceful negotiation process. The ministry reiterated the support of Mauritania's leadership, government and people to the Palestinian people to obtain all their legitimate rights in the establishment of an independent state on its entire territory with Jerusalem as its capital."
- Mexico – Mexico's Secretariat of Foreign Affairs (SRE) issued a statement that condemned Israeli attacks and called for the immediate cessation of hostilities and the protection of civilians on both sides.
- Morocco – On 9 July, the Ministry of Foreign Affairs issued a statement that offered its condolences to the families of Palestinian victims. After denouncing Israel's escalation, it warned that this could damage efforts made to resume the peace process. It called on the international community to take urgent action to end the fighting, protect the Palestinian people, hold Israel accountable for its flagrant aggression and force it to abide by international law.
- Namibia – On 15 July, the Ministry of Foreign affairs stated, "The Government of the Republic of Namibia has been following with grave concern the massive aerial bombardment of Gaza, Palestinian Territory, by the Israeli Air and Naval Forces." It also "called on the two warring parties to immediate cease fighting and strongly urged them to agree to a ceasefire."
- New Zealand – On 9 July, Foreign Affairs Minister Murray McCully said "New Zealand is greatly concerned at the recent escalation of violence in Gaza and Israel, and in particular the deaths of civilians. New Zealand urges both sides to show restraint and to prevent any further civilian casualties. We call for an immediate end to rocket attacks into Israel and for proportionate responses that do not further escalate the situation. The current situation reinforces the urgent need for a sustainable resolution to the conflict between Israel and Palestinians." "New Zealand wants to see progress in the peace process between Israel and the Palestinians and we urge the political leadership on each side to find a peaceful way through the current flare up."
- Nicaragua – On 11 July, President Daniel Ortega expressed "solidarity with the Palestinian people and condemned the genocidal bombing of Israel. How are we going to condemn us not, at this time, the genocide being committed against the Palestinian people again? Now go over there 80 dead, children, youth of all ages. Who for that genocide?"
- Niger – On 22 July, the Government of Niger released a statement condemning the aerial bombardment of Gaza and calling on Israel to "put an end to its policy of occupation and colonization as well as to the blockade unjustly imposed on Gaza, which are at the root of the legitimate revolt by the Palestinian peoples." Niger called on the UNSG as well as the UNSC to put an immediate end to the "abominable crimes committed in Gaza" and to find the basis for a just and durable solution to the Israeli-Palestinian conflict.
- North Korea – On 15 July, the Foreign Ministry stated, "We bitterly denounce Israel's brutal killings of many defenseless Palestinians through indiscriminate military attacks on peaceable residential areas in Palestine as they are unpardonable crimes against humanity."
- Norway – On 15 July, Minister for Foreign Affairs Børge Brende stated, "the events of the past weeks in Gaza and the West Bank have once more underscored the importance of reaching a lasting political solution to the conflict between Israel and the Palestinians, through the establishment of an independent Palestinian state." On 18 July, Brende condemned Israel's ground operations. "This is an unacceptable action, especially when a ceasefire could have been reached. While visiting Israel during the conflict, he entered a bomb shelter in Ashkelon.He advised Netanyahu against a ground operation because "it would create a much bigger problem."
- Oman – Majlis Al Shura Chairman Khalid Al Mawali said the events in Gaza are "an act of madness and reflect the weakness of the community, differences and divide within and the absence of a clear vision. We have to cooperate and be more responsible to minimise the sufferings of Palestinians and do our best to stop Israeli aggression, which is beyond description. Now, people of Gaza do not know if it is day or night. The number of those being killed and injured is multiplying into thousands. Even the medical teams and civil defence ambulances are not safe from bombings, depriving the injured and sick people of their most basic minimum right to receive treatment and be healed. The world is not doing anything but just expressing pain".
- Pakistan – Prime Minister Nawaz Sharif said: "I am saddened and disappointed to note the silence of international community against this injustice, the silence and ineffectiveness of the Muslim Ummah has made Palestinians more vulnerable and made Israel more aggressive. The world must stop Israel from this naked and brutal aggression". He termed the Israeli acts against in Gaza as 'genocide'. Sharif said Israeli atrocities were no lesser a tragedy and that the bombardment on human settlements and massacre of innocent people was a lesson for the world community. He said, "Pakistan strongly condemns it. The civilised world must take cognisance of the situation because it was a tragedy for the whole humanity."
- Peru – On 13 July, Foreign Minister Gonzalo Gutierrez "condemned the killing of Palestinian civilians by Israeli attacks on the Gaza Strip and recalled that his country recognised the State of Palestine. [The events] can not and should not continue. No attack scenario and that is affecting bombing civilian targets sensitive way possible." On 29 July, Peru recalled its ambassador to Israel.
- Philippines – The Department of Foreign Affairs issued an "Alert Level Warning 3" for Filipinos in the Gaza Strip. It stated that its embassies in Egypt, Jordan and Israel "are ready to assist Filipinos who wants to leave Israel. [We] are concerned on growing threats of Hamas to the Filipino citizens in Israel."
- Qatar – On 8 July, the Foreign Ministry "strongly condemned the series of Israeli raids on Gaza Strip on Sunday night, which killed and injured a group of Palestinian people. Qatar strongly denounces Israel's ongoing hostile acts in the West Bank and Gaza Strip. It urged the international community to move to stop Israeli aggression against Palestinians and lift the unjust siege on the Gaza Strip."
- Romania – The Ministry of Foreign Affairs activated a crisis cell for granting consular assistance to Romanian citizens in Gaza. Likewise, several consular teams equipped with mobile means of granting consular assistance were dispatched.
- Russia – The Kremlin stated that President Vladimir Putin had telephoned Netanyahu, urging him to stop the operation that lead [sic] to civilian deaths. It added that "the conversation was requested by the Israeli side." On 9 July, Putin told a delegation of visiting rabbis that he supported "Israel's battle that is intended to keep its citizens protected". In a 23 July telephone conversation with Netanyahu, Putin said further fighting would lead to a dramatic deterioration of the humanitarian situation and to more casualties and suffering. Putin stressed that "there is no alternative to ceasefire and a political settlement" and reiterated his readiness to "facilitate mediatory efforts and the implementation of peace initiatives, including within the UN framework". Chairman of the Foreign Affairs Committee of the Federation Council, the upper house of the Russian Parliament Mikhail Margelov said Russia was ready to facilitate reconciliation. He also said, "It is very important for us that the parties complied with the UN resolutions. Our position remained unchanged: we want the Jewish and Arab peoples to live in peace and accord. We're ready to facilitate the peace process at the bilateral level and within international organizations. Amid the ground operation in Gaza the logic of events prevails over political expediency. In Gaza there are different groups that do not maintain contacts. The situation is not controlled by a single centre. This complicates attempts to find a political solution". On 25 July Russian Foreign Ministry published a message calling for an immediate ceasefire under Egypt's initiative saying "The events in Gaza arouse growing concern. We condemn the death of innocent people, primarily children, during the attack on the UN school in Beit-Hanoun".
- Sahrawi Republic – On 23 July, the Polisario Front, which claims Western Sahara (disputed with Morocco), condemned "the genocide and mass destruction Israel is committing" and reaffirming its "strong solidarity" with the Palestinian people.
- Saudi Arabia – The governing cabinet issued a statement that read it "condemned Israeli military aggression and brutal raids on Gaza Strip." During a weekly cabinet session, headed by Crown Prince Salman bin Abdulaziz Al Saud, the cabinet called on the UNSC and HRC "to live up to their responsibilities and implement the Fourth Geneva Convention on Israel." It also called for a "quick action to stop the Israeli aggression on Gaza Strip in addition to all crimes and violations against the Palestinian people." Saudi King Abdullah bin Abdulaziz Al Saud ordered $50 million in aid to be transferred to the Palestinian Red Crescent. He also described the Israel offensive as a war crime and state terrorism. He said "We see the blood of our brothers in Palestine shed in collective massacres that did not exclude anyone, and war crimes against humanity without scruples, humanity or morality".
- Senegal – On 18 July, the Senegalese government said that the solutions must take into account "the legitimate rights" of the Palestinian people. It also urged Israeli restraint and called for an immediate ceasefire while reaffirming its solidarity and support to the Palestinian cause.
- Serbia – Serbian Prime Minister Aleksandar Vučić stated that Serbia respected Israel's right to existence and peace and expressed hope that the situation will be resolved peacefully.
- Singapore – On 19 July, Singapore issued a statement that read it "strongly supports the United Nations' Secretary-General's call for an immediate cessation of hostilities in Gaza and urged all parties involved to do their utmost to ensure the protection of civilians." In response to media queries about Israel's ground offensive, a spokesman for the Ministry of Foreign Affairs said that "the deteriorating situation in Gaza will sharply exacerbate the humanitarian crisis. Singapore urged all parties to work towards a lasting ceasefire that would bring an end to the suffering, the spokesman said, adding that it was important to break the cycle of violence and the focus now has to be the safety and security of all innocent people affected by the conflict and for humanitarian aid to be delivered to them on an urgent basis."
- Somalia – Deputy Prime Minister Ridwan Hirsi Mohamed, who was attending the Muslim Scholars Forum in Istanbul, said that the international community had failed to oppose Israeli aggression. "The ongoing genocide committed by Israel against our brothers in Palestine is something that we can not accept. Killing innocent people of women and children, targeting hospitals, mosques and schools is something very hateful. We share the pain with Palestinians, as we strongly say that Somalia is very upset about what is going in Gaza". He called on the Israeli government to stop killing and asked the world, particularly the Muslim World, to break its silence and do something.
- South Africa – Foreign Ministry spokesman Clayson Monyela stated that the country "strongly urge all sides to refrain from responding to violence with violence and to exercise restraint, including a halt to the arbitrary arrest of Palestinian civilians and the use of collective punishment on Palestinians."
- Spain – On 18 July, Spain released a statement expressing its "profound concern" over ground operations and called on Israel to scrupulously respect civilian life and social services infrastructure such as schools and hospitals. Spain called on all parties to cease military action."
- Sri Lanka – On 16 July, the External Affairs Ministry called for a ceasefire. "Sri Lanka is deeply concerned at the recent escalating violence in Gaza, resulting in tragic loss of civilian lives and extensive damage to property. Cross-border provocation on locations in parts of Israel also need to cease."
- Sudan – On 13 July, the Foreign Ministry called for "urgent international protection for Palestinians....Without that international protection, it becomes meaningless to speak about the international legitimacy, justice, humanitarian values and fighting terrorism. Sudan condemns the Israeli aggression on the Gaza Strip [and] denounces weak international reactions."
- Sweden – On 11 July, Foreign Minister Carl Bildt wrote on Twitter that "no one was winning by resorting to violence" and called for a ceasefire between the two sides.
- Syria – Prime Minister Wael Nader al-Halqi said that "the massacres perpetrated by the Zionists are within the same scope of the acts of terrorism practiced by the armed groups in Syria." Deputy Foreign Minister Faisal Mekdad expressed support for the Palestinian people and condemned Israel's "bloody aggression on the Palestinian people and the crimes committed by hordes of settlers who have burned Palestinians to death". On 15 July, The cabinet condemned the savage massacres committed by the 'racial Zionist occupation'.
- Tanzania – On 14 July, Foreign Minister Bernard Membe called for an immediate ceasefire and condemned the killings of civilians. He called upon the international community to continue supporting diplomatic efforts in ending the conflict and emphasized that the solution to this conflict is to support self determination via an independent Palestinian State.
- Thailand – On 16 July, Foreign Ministry Permanent Secretary Sihasak Phuangketkeow, also serving as acting Foreign Minister, called on Israel and Palestine to talk. "Thailand did not want to see the situation worsen as it would affect innocent people, particularly children. There are a number of Thais currently working in Israel. This deteriorating situation requires all sides to return to the negotiating table and seek a way out together."
- Trinidad and Tobago – On 16 July, Foreign Affairs Minister Winston Dookeran called for peace and "expressed deep concern over the recent escalation of hostilities between the two states. Trinidad and Tobago urges the combatants to avoid any action that would complicate the current situation and lead to an extensive military campaign. It was imperative that as a first step the hostilities be brought to an immediate halt, in order to permit the space and time for sober reflection and dialogue among the parties, with the involvement of the international community. Trinidad and Tobago renews its support for the important role played by the United Nations and other international agencies in seeking to definitively resolve this conflict and, in that regard, we call upon the parties to work, in good faith, towards the full and effective implementation of previous resolutions passed by United Nations Security Council, in order to establish the basis for lasting peace and security. Trinidad and Tobago urges all concerned to take all necessary steps to ensure that persons and communities in need of humanitarian aid and support are allowed immediate, unimpeded access to such services, in order to reduce the burden of suffering visited upon them."
- Tunisia – On 9 July, the Foreign Ministry condemned the Israeli military escalation and demanded the UNSC "immediately intervene to stop such attacks." It restated Tunisia's solidarity with the Palestinian people and called on "the international community and the UN Security Council to assume their responsibilities and urgently intervene to force the Israeli government to immediately stop these unjustified attacks, which aim to further destroy the lives of the Palestinian people and puts the area on the brink of explosion."
- Turkey – President Abdullah Gül said that: "Israel should stop its intensified bombardment of the Gaza Strip and never contemplate a possible ground offensive". Prime Minister Recep Tayyip Erdoğan accused Israel of conducting "state terrorism" and a "genocide attempt" against the Palestinians. He also stated that "as long as children are being slaughtered in Palestine, normalisation of Turkey-Israel relations are no longer possible". Erdoğan later added that Netanyahu "surpasses Hitler in barbarism". Turkey declared three days of national mourning for Palestinian victims.
- United Kingdom – Foreign Secretary William Hague expressed concern over the violence. He stated, "I condemn the firing of rockets into Israel by Gaza-based militants. The UK calls on Hamas and other militant groups to stop these attacks". In separate telephone calls to Abbas and Israeli Foreign Minister Avigdor Lieberman, he spoke of the British government's "deep concern about the number of civilian casualties and the need for all sides to avoid further civilian injuries and the loss of innocent life." Deputy Prime Minister Nick Clegg stated that Israel's airstrikes against the Gaza Strip were "deliberately disproportionate" and constituted "collective punishment". Senior Foreign Office minister Baronness Warsi resigned from her post on 5 August, saying that the government's "approach and language during the current crisis in Gaza is morally indefensible."
- United States –On 8 July President Barack Obama repeated his request that both sides use restraint and that the "only way to achieve long lasting peace is not through fighting but through a common understanding and agreement." White House spokesman Josh Earnest stated: "No country can accept rocket fire aimed at civilians and we support Israel's right to defend itself against these vicious attacks."
  - On 11 July, the United States House of Representatives passed a non-binding resolution supporting Israel and denouncing Hamas.
- Uruguay – On 10 July, the Foreign Ministry "strenuously condemned" Israel's attacks, calling them a "disproportionate response" to Hamas' rockets. The statement also condemned the rocket attacks that threatened the civilian population of Israel.
- Venezuela – On 10 July President Nicolás Maduro said his government "vigorously condemns the unfair and disproportionate military response by the illegal state of Israel against the heroic Palestinian people."
- Vietnam – On 18 July, Foreign Ministry spokesman Le Hai said: "Vietnam strongly concern [sic] escalating violence inflicting severe casualties to civilians. We urge the parties concerned to stop firing, resuming the negotiations and supported the efforts of the international community in order to soon bring peace and stability to the region."
- Yemen – Undersecretary of Foreign Ministry for Political Affairs Hameed al-Awadhi, who heads Yemeni delegation to the extraordinary meeting of the executive committee of the Organisation of Islamic Cooperation (OIC), called for intensifying efforts to stop Israel actions.
- Zimbabwe – On 21 July, at the Joint Commission of Co-operation meeting held in Harare, the respective foreign ministers, host Simbarashe Mumbengegwi expressed grave concern over the aerial bombardment, called for a ceasefire. He highlighted the right of the Palestinian people to self-determination and reiterated support for a two-state solution.

== Non-governmental organizations ==
- Amnesty International – Called for an arms embargo on all sides enforced by the UN and an investigation into possible war crimes.
- B'Tselem – Stated that attacks by Israel on homes of members of armed Palestinian groups are violations of international humanitarian law and that deliberate targeting of civilians by Hamas and other Palestinian armed groups defies humanity and is morally and legally reprehensible.
- Human Rights Watch – Stated, "Palestinian rocket attacks on Israel appear to be indiscriminate or targeted at civilian population centers, which are war crimes, while Israeli attacks targeting homes may amount to prohibited collective punishment."
- Red Cross – Stated, "The International Committee of the Red Cross calls on all sides to protect civilians and medical workers caught in the midst of the escalating conflict."

== Demonstrations ==
=== Pro-Palestinian ===
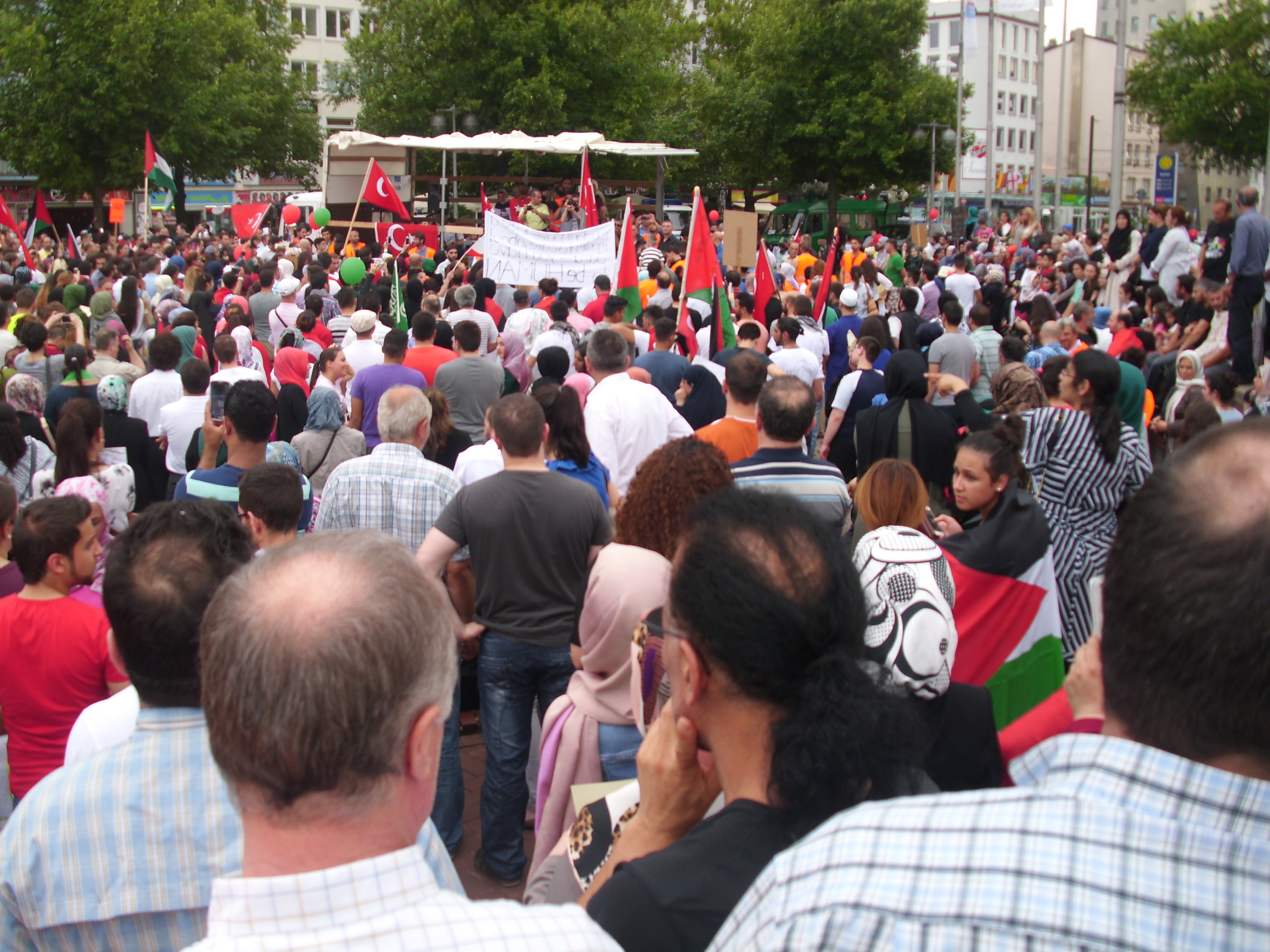
Pro-Palestinian demonstration in Hanover, Germany to show solidarity for Gaza

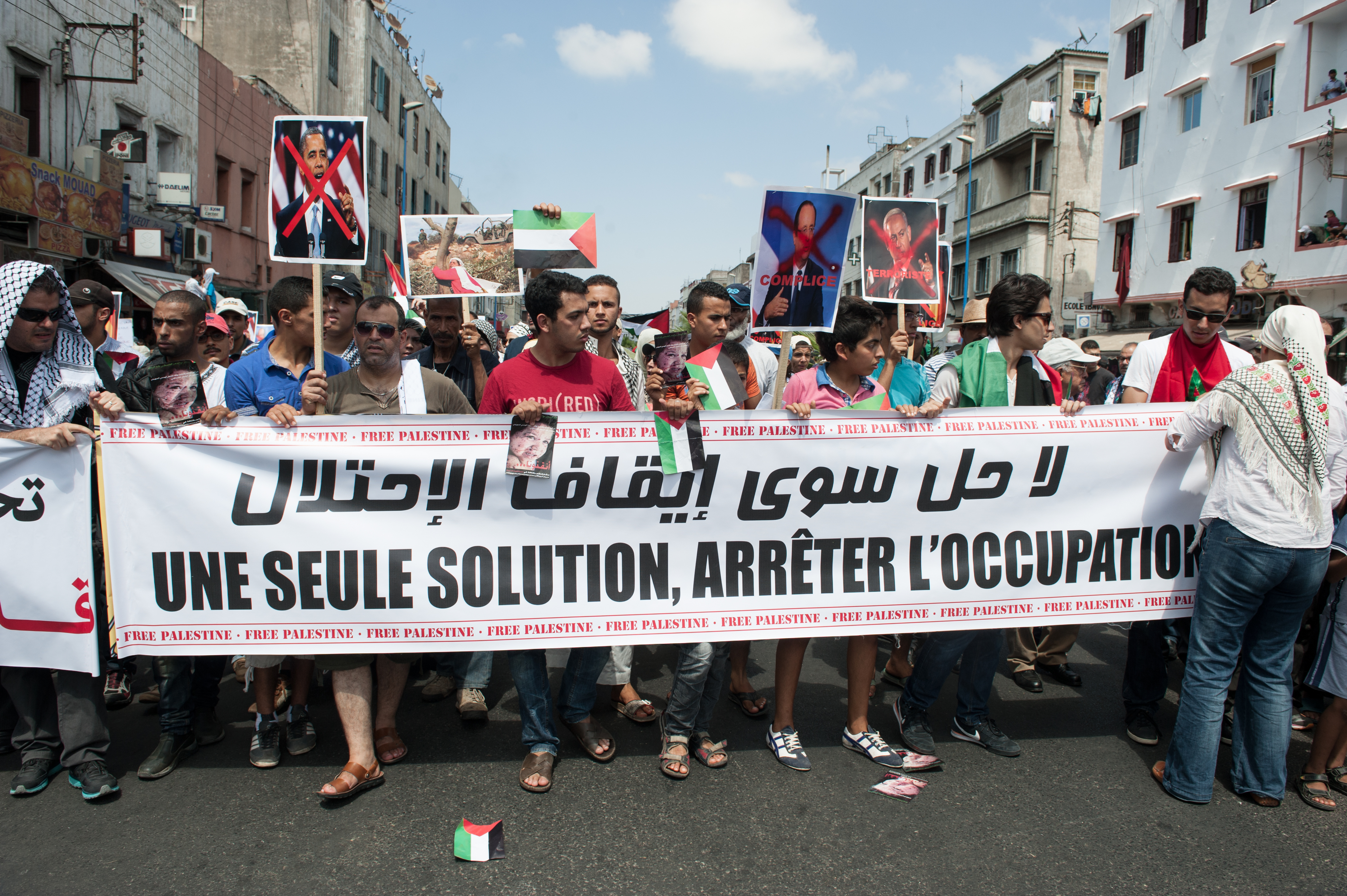
Pro-Palestinian demonstration in Casablanca, Morocco, 27 July 2014

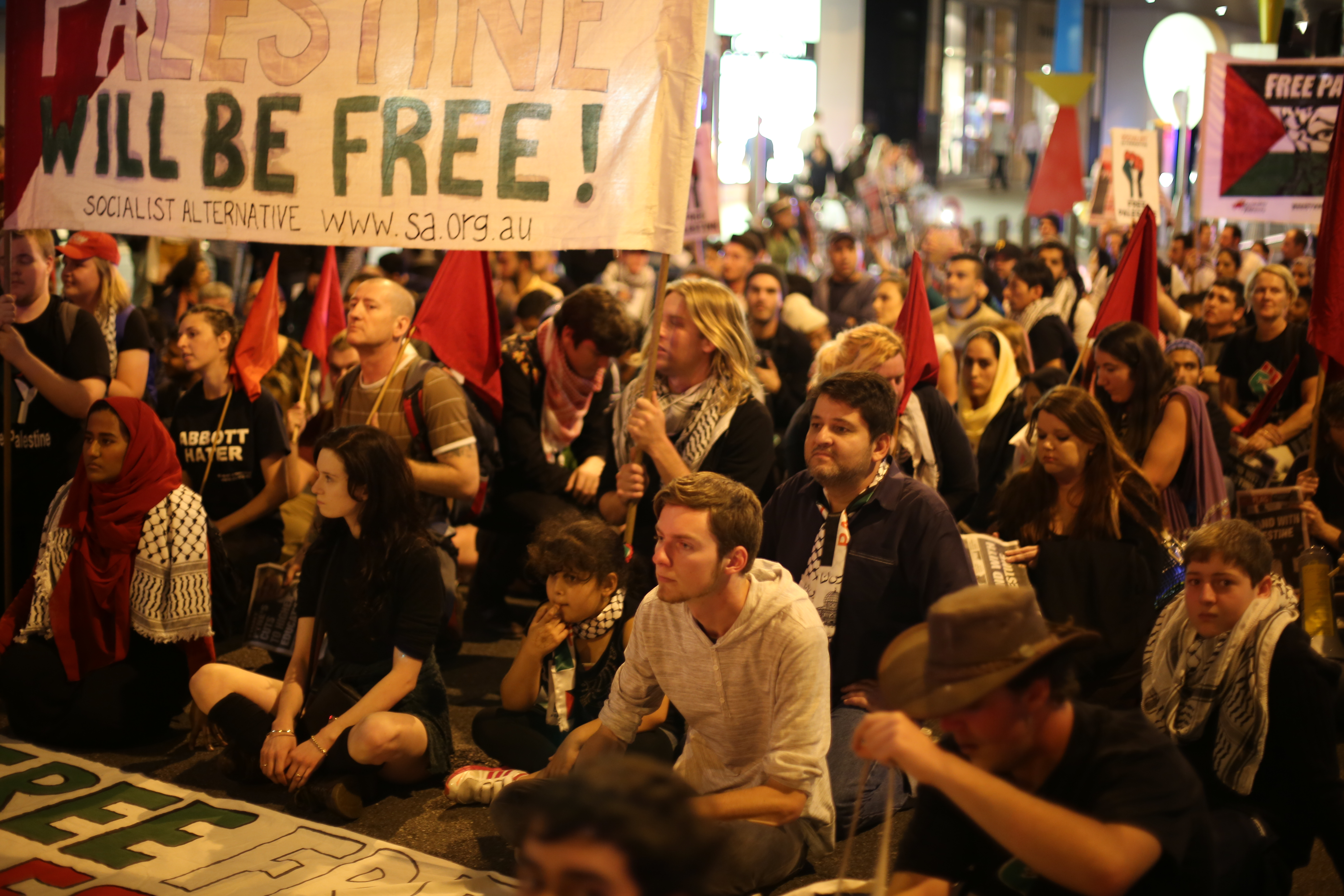
Pro-Palestinian protest in Brisbane, Australia, 1 August 2014

Protests were organized by pro-Palestinian groups throughout the world. Around 45,000 people demonstrated in London, 20,000 in Santiago, 3,000 in Oslo, hundreds in Caracas and around 2,000 in Tunis. Protests were planned in Amman, at the UN in Geneva and in Kashmir. In Ireland, 3,000 people demonstrated in Dublin. Demonstrations also took place in Derry, Galway, Cork and Limerick.

In Paris, France, on 13 July, around 10,000 people and on 18 July about 5,000 protested the Israeli operation. Dozens of protesters tried to force their way into a synagogue with around 150 people inside, attempting to enter it armed with bats and chairs, and chanting "Death to Jews" and ultimately clashed with Parisian police who blocked them from entering. The city's government banned pro-Palestinian protests after two synagogues were attacked on 13 July. On 19 July, Parisian protesters clashed with riot police in a working-class neighborhood.

In Frankfurt, Germany, neo-Nazis and Islamists clashed with police, resulting in 8 injured police officers. Signs held by these groups read as things such as "You Jews are Beasts". After the clash, the groups looked for Jewish institutions, and Frankfurt police said they were going to protect these institutions.

Demonstrations in solidarity with Gaza took part or were scheduled in all regions of Spain, from Bilbao in the Basque Country to Santiago de Compostela in Galicia to Barcelona in Catalonia and in the Canary Islands. On 14 July some 500 people of different nationalities demonstrated in the area near the Israeli Embassy in Madrid. The protesters chanted, "Long live the struggle of the Palestinian people!" and "You Zionists are the terrorists!"

In Brazil, protests organized by the Arab-Brazilian community and left-wing movements against Israel and for Palestine were attended by over 2000 people in São Paulo and over hundreds in Rio de Janeiro, Recife, Porto Alegre, Foz do Iguaçu, Curitiba and Campinas.

Some 150–200 participants joined a demonstration organised by the association of Palestinians living in Hungary. The demonstration called for stopping the "terrorist bombing" of Gaza and for "Palestine's freedom."

One teenager aged 15–16 years old was killed in Khudwani, a village south of Srinagar when Indian government forces fired on a pro-Palestinian rally. Kashmiris held pro-Palestinian protests every day since the start of the conflict. On 17 July, demonstrations were held in Morocco and Yemen in solidarity with Gazan civilians, while protestors burned Israeli flags.

In Jordan, a protest was held in front of the Israeli embassy in Amman. Demonstrators in Amman burned Israeli flags and urged Palestinian factions in Gaza to increase rocket attacks on Israel.

In Cape Town, South Africa approximately 4,000 protested in support of the Palestinians on 16 July. A Pro-Palestinian protest was held in Pretoria, South Africa, calling for the freedom of Palestine.

134 demonstrations were held in the first fifteen days of the conflict in the United States. Demonstrations took place in Los Angeles and New York. In August 2014, the Port of Oakland was the scene of a protest against an Israeli-owned ship. Palestinian demonstrators claimed to have the support of the port's International Longshore and Warehouse Union(ILWU) dockworkers who they said had refused to unload the ship's cargo. The union however denied this saying the ILWU had not taken a position on the conflict. The demonstration produced a heavy police presence, initially comprising more than 100 police officers. The ship's cargo remained unloaded for four days.

==== 2014 Quds Day ====
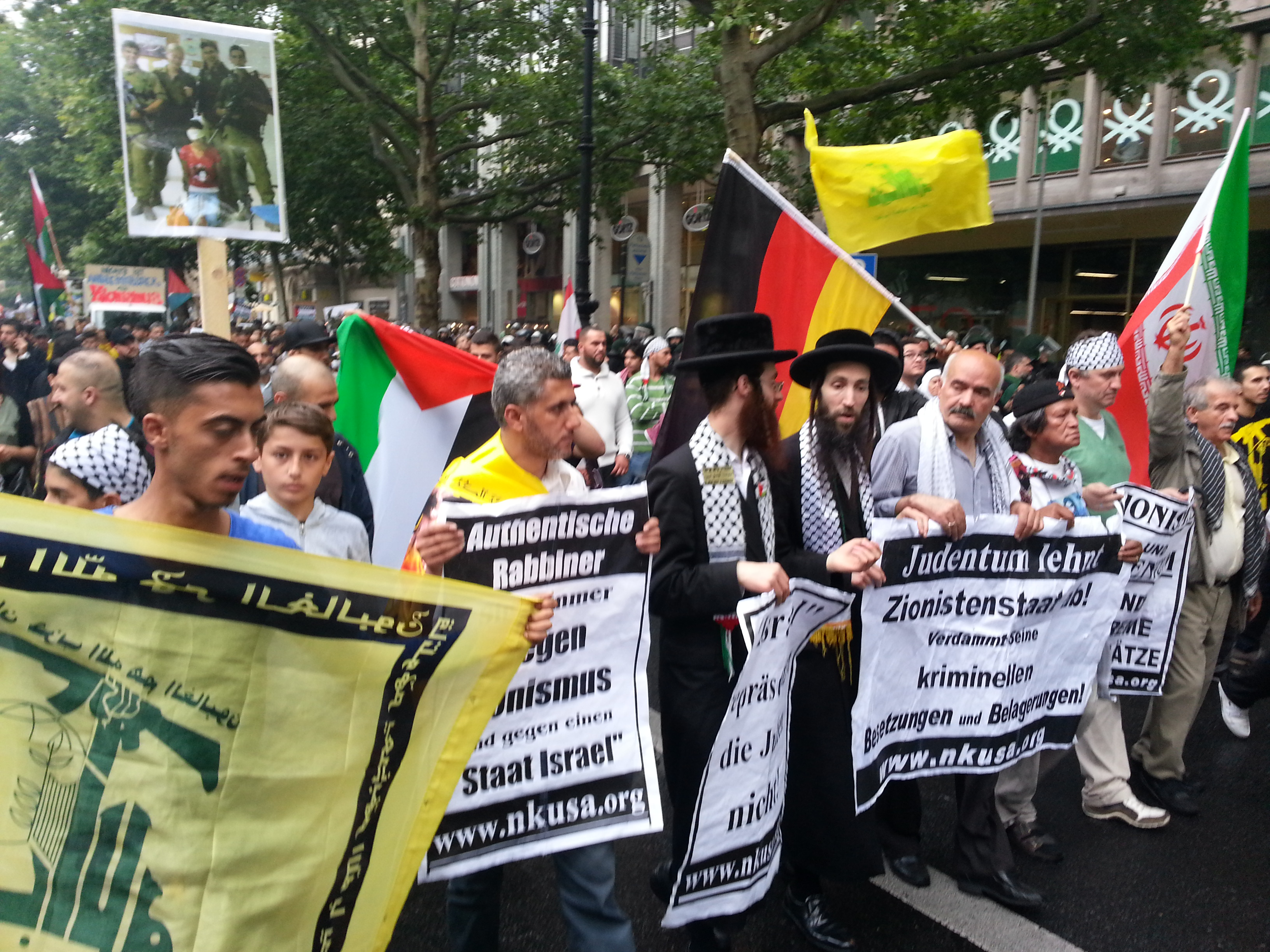
Quds Day 2014 in Berlin

On 25 July 2014, International Quds Day, millions of people around the world called for the liberation of Palestine and an end to the Israeli occupation of the Palestinian territories. Pro-Palestinian demonstrators, marched in streets of Afghanistan Argentina, Azerbaijan, Germany Iran Lebanon Australia South Africa Pakistan India Iraq Bahrain Belgium West Bank Canada Jordan Egypt Singapore Syria Tunisia Turkey Yemen Saudi Arabia China, South Korea Kenya New Zealand Nigeria Sudan Algeria Bangladesh Kyrgyzstan United States United Kingdom, Tanzania, Hong Kong, Taiwan, and Japan.

The Quds Day march was banned in France. Despite the ban, pro-Palestinian protest took place in Paris and other French cities.

In Nigeria, the Nigerian Army fired on members of the Islamic Movement taking part in a Quds Day rally in the ancient city of Zaria, in Nigeria's Kaduna State, killing 35. Numerous other Islamic Movement members were arrested. The Nigerian Army claimed that soldiers had acted in self-defense. According to eyewitnesses, the incident happened when protesters tried to force their way through a military checkpoint, defying orders from soldiers to take another route. The event became known as the Zaria Quds Day massacres.

==== Global Day of Rage ====
On 9 August 2014, a "Global Day of Rage" drew tens of thousands of people across the world to protest Israel's offensive. According to Palestinian Solidarity Campaign, 150,000 people marched through London, shouting anti-Israel slogans and calling for an "end to the siege". Demonstrators first marched to the BBC's Broadcasting House headquarters to denounce what they called pro-Israeli bias. They filled the main shopping artery of Oxford Street, marched to the US embassy in Grosvenor Square and to Hyde Park. One banner said "UK – Stop Arming Israel".

In Paris, several thousand people marched, calling for end to Israeli aggression, carrying banners condemning the violence. Some protesters carried mannequins wrapped in a Palestinian flag, depicting Palestinian deaths. In Berlin 1,000 people took part in two rallies. In Tehran hundreds of doctors, nurses and paramedics gathered in "Palestine Square"

In New Delhi, a protest was organized by 70 political and social groups on the theme of "Stop The Genocide in Gaza! Boycott Israel!" Protestors demanded that the international community, including India should "boycott Israel till the time it continues the illegal occupation of Palestine".

In Melbourne protesters marched down Swanston Street and gathered in front of Department of Foreign Affairs & Trade building. Protesters called for an end to Israel's blockade. They called on Australia to cut all ties with Israel, release Palestinian political prisoners and end Israel's occupation of the West Bank and East Jerusalem. Protesters urged the UN to convene a special general assembly to condemn Israeli aggression and demand the country abide by International law, Agreements and Conventions

In Yemen, an estimated 100,000 people attended a pro-Palestinian demonstration in Sanaa.

At least 100,000 held a pro-Palestine march called by the National Coalition for Palestine in Cape Town on 9 August.

=== Pro-Israel ===
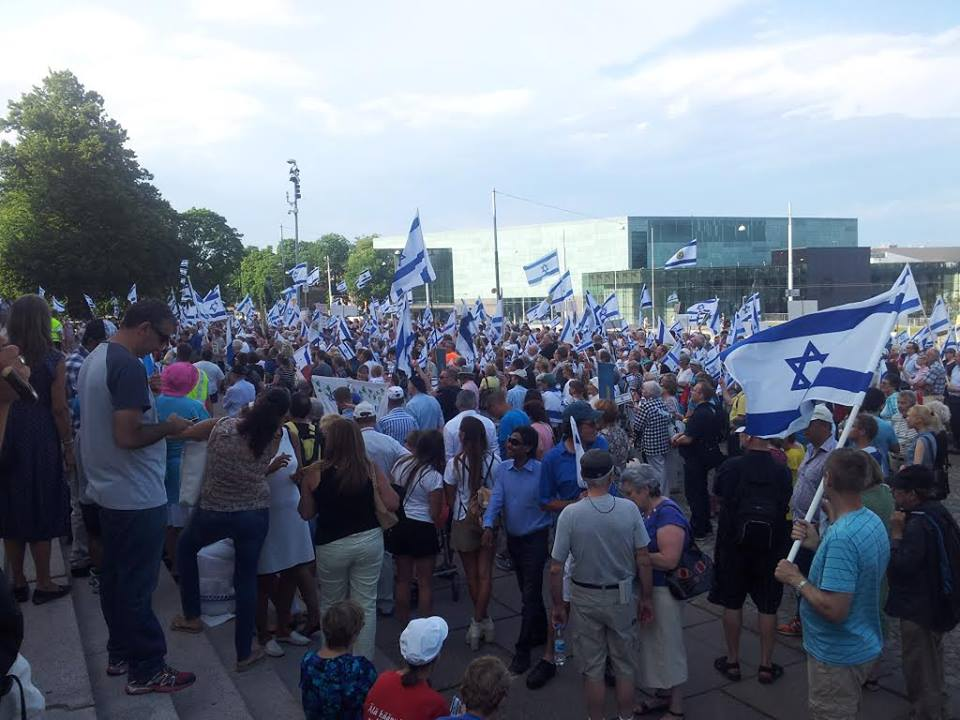
Pro-Israel demonstration in Helsinki, Finland

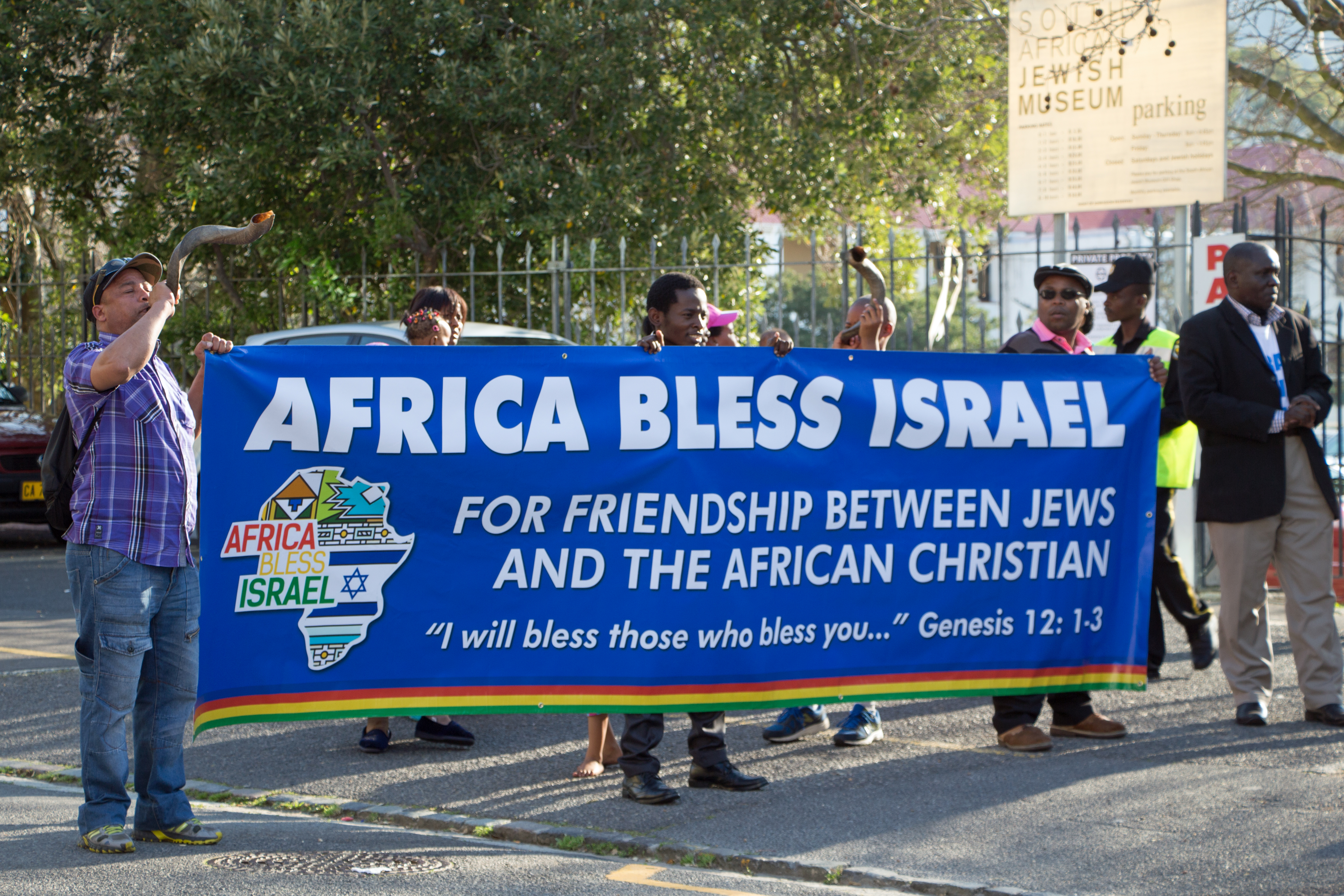
Pro-Israel demonstration in Cape Town, South Africa

Pro-Israel rallies were held in Argentina, Canada, Chile, El Salvador, Mexico, Russia, Uruguay and the United States.

On 10 July 200 people voiced support for Israel at the Rockland County Courthouse. On 11 July, In Philadelphia, Israel supporters rallied outside the Israeli consulate. A plethora of actors, producers, directors and other entertainment professionals signed a statement opposing Hamas. A pro-Israel rally of more than 1,200 supporters in Los Angeles resulted in physical violence after its protesters ripped a Palestinian flag away from a passing vehicle and began stomping on it. On 13 July, a pro-Israel rally attacked a passing car that was flying Palestinian flags in Westwood, Los Angeles. A police officer fired a shot to intervene in the situation. On 14 July, over two dozen elected officials rallied at New York City Hall in support of Israel. On 17 July over 1,200 supporters attended a demonstration at a local synagogue in the Greater Toronto area. Around 5,000 people attended a 20 July pro-Israel rally in New York City, while a smaller counter-protest was held nearby. Both rallies were held without incident.

On 3 August 2014, 3000 people participated in The Bay Stands With Israel solidarity rally in downtown San Francisco, after which approximately 1,200 demonstrators marched under police escort. Signed carried by the protestors included "Israel is the only country in the Middle East where they don't burn American flags" and "More Hummus, Less Hamas."

On 27 July, supporters of Israel marched through the streets of Mexico City to show their solidarity with Israel, asking for peace and condemning Hamas' rocket fire.

On 10 August, up to 600 people including several MPs marked their support for Israel in a demonstration outside the Norwegian Parliament in Oslo. A pro-Israel rally was held at the South African Jewish Museum in Cape Town on 10 August attended by some 5,000 people. In Budapest some 4,500 people attended an interfaith rally in support of Israel, while a smaller counter demonstration was held near the synagogue building by the far-right Hungarian Jobbik political party.

In Paris, a pro-Israeli rally was attended by some 8,000 people who gathered near Israel's embassy, while a similar demonstration in Marseilles gathered some 2,000 participants.

In London some 5,000 people turned out to show solidarity In Helsinki, the pro-Israeli rally was attended by some 1,000 participants Pro-Israeli rallies were held in Sydney, where some 10,000 people participated. Another pro-Israeli rally was held in Brisbane.

In Brazil, some 2,500 people gathered in at the Copacabana beach in Rio de Janeiro, to support Israel, another pro-Israel rally in Brazil took place in São Paulo, where some 3,000 people marched.

Hundreds of Israeli supporters marched in Guatemala City. In the city of Gori in Georgia, a support rally was organized, with children painting their faces with the Israeli flag Another pro-Israeli rally was held in Tokyo. On 16 August 2014 in Kolkata, India 20,000 demonstrators from the Hindu, Sikh, and Buddhist communities held the biggest pro-Israel rally so far with many Indian political activists proclaiming Israel's rights to defend itself.

=== Civic reaction within Israel ===
Reaction among the non-Arab Israeli population was strongly supportive of the military action. Israel's Arab minority mostly opposed the war. Opinion polls consistently showed a very high level of support for the military operation among the Jewish public, varying between 91% and 95%. An opinion poll which surveyed Israeli-Arabs found that 62% of the Arab public opposed the operation while 24% supported it.

Numerous demonstrations in support of the operation were held in Israel. In Sderot, Israelis gathered on the hillside to watch and cheer Israeli military strikes on nearby Gaza. Anti-war demonstrations were also held, but demonstrators were often confronted by counter-demonstrators in support of the war and in some cases faced verbal and physical harassment. About 1,500 Arabs and a handful of Jews were arrested for involvement in anti-war demonstrations. A one-day general strike in solidarity with Gaza was declared among Israeli-Arabs, and many Arab businesses temporarily closed.

== War crimes accusations ==
As the scale of Operation Protective Edge expanded, civilian casualties mounted and accusations of war crimes were levelled from different quarters. On 19 July, Nabil el-Araby, the head of the Cairo-based Arab League, accused Israel of perpetrating "war crimes".

On 21 July, Navi Pillay, the United Nations High Commissioner for Human Rights, criticized Israel's military operation stating that there was "a strong possibility that international law has been violated, in a manner that could amount to war crimes". She also criticized Hamas for "indiscriminate attacks" on Israel.

Human rights advocacy group B'Tselem argued that both Palestinian rocket fire and Israeli targeting the homes of militia members, could constitute war crimes and be violating international law. The international organization Human Rights Watch described Hamas's deliberate targeting of Israeli civilians as war crimes in a 9 July statement and also called Israel's attacks on civilian structures as "unlawful under the laws of war" and "collective punishment". Amnesty International said that the "UN must impose arms embargo on Israel/Gaza and mandate an international investigation".

On 23 July HRC announced an investigation into the accusations of war crimes.

== International diplomacy ==
Ecuador, Brazil, Peru, El Salvador and Chile recalled their ambassadors from Tel Aviv as a reaction to Israel's offensive. Brazil and Chile suspended trade talks with Israel.

Spain froze arms and military technology exports to Israel, stopping sales of defense and dual use technology. Britain was reported to be reviewing its arms sales to Israel.

== Cyber attacks ==
Pro-Palestinian hackers carried out cyber-attacks on Israeli commercial, government, aviation and banking websites. Anonymous's 'OpIsrael' defaced or took down more than 1,000 Israeli websites, including Israeli government web domains such as those of Mossad, the Tel Aviv Police Department and the Israeli Ministry of Defense. Hackers claimed to have published over 170 emails and passwords of Israeli officials on 21 July. A report by Arbor Networks showed a direct correlation between cyber attacks and the intensity of the conflict. Iranian and Chinese hackers were blamed for some of the attacks.

In some instances, Israeli security forces responded to attacks with 'counter hacks' targeting Hamas websites. Pro-Israeli hackers called the Israeli Elite Force published what were said to be 45,000 usernames and passwords of government officials at the Gaza Ministry of Health.

== Rise in antisemitism ==
Multiple pro-Palestinian protests in Europe descended into antisemitic violence against local Jewish communities. Some demonstrators called for the death of Jews and attacked Jews and Jewish-owned property. These actions raised concerns over antisemitism and the safety of Jews in European countries. Similar concerns over antisemitism were raised following protests in other countries.

During a rally in the capital of Belgium's Flemish region one speaker reportedly used a loudspeaker to chant in Arabic "slaughter the Jews." A sign on a Belgian cafe declaring that no Jews were allowed inside was removed by following a complaint. A Holocaust memorial in the Netherlands was defaced with "free Gaza" graffiti. In Morocco, the rabbi of the Jewish community of Casablanca was attacked while walking to synagogue for Shabbat services and severely beaten by a man who told the rabbi that he was taking retribution for Gaza. The rabbi claimed that he asked passerby for help but was ignored. There was a reported increase of antisemitic harassment in Morocco. Rome's historic Jewish quarter was vandalized with swastikas and antisemitic graffiti.

Police in England recorded more than 100 antisemitic hate crimes since the start of the Gaza conflict. In Toulouse, France, a man was arrested by local police for throwing fire-bombs at a Jewish community center. The fire-bombs failed to ignite. In Malmö, Sweden, a rabbi and a member of his congregation were assaulted at different times on the same day. In Australia, antisemitic attacks occurred in Sydney, Perth and Melbourne. Teenagers harassed Jewish schoolchildren on a Sydney bus, a Jewish school was vandalized in Perth and a Jewish man was beaten in a street attack in Melbourne.

In South Africa, the South African Jewish Board of Deputies laid criminal charges of hate speech and incitement of violence against the South African Jewish community. Complaints were lodged at the South African Human Rights Commission against the regional secretary of the Western Cape region of COSATU, Tony Ehrenreich, over comments he made on social media that included the statement "The time has come to say very clearly that if a woman or child is killed in Gaza, then the Jewish board of deputies, who are complicit, will feel the wrath of the people of SA with the age old biblical teaching of an eye for an eye. The time has come for the conflict to be waged everywhere the Zionist supporters fund and condone the war killing machine of Israel".

=== Attacks on synagogues ===
Synagogues were targeted by pro-Palestinian protesters. Following a demonstration in Paris, protesters attempted to break into nearby synagogues. Six police officers and two Jewish residents were injured during the scuffle. In Wuppertal, Germany, a synagogue was firebombed. In Belfast, Northern Ireland, bricks were thrown through the windows of a local synagogue on two successive nights. A synagogue was vandalized in Malmö, Sweden. And a synagogue in Miami, Florida, was vandalized with graffiti; swastikas and the word "Hamas" were painted on the building. On 29 August, it was reported that French police uncovered a plot by two teenage Muslim girls, aged 15 and 17, to commit a suicide bombing attack at the Great Synagogue of Lyon, in Lyon, France. They were indicted on 22 August on charges of conspiracy to commit terrorism. During an anti-Israel rally in front of a synagogue in Turkey, demonstrators pelted the synagogue with eggs.

=== Antisemitism in the media ===
During the war, newspapers throughout the Arab and Muslim world published cartoons with antisemitic caricatures and themes. A mainstream newspaper in Spain published an op-ed which claimed that Israel's military operation demonstrated why Jews were so frequently expelled throughout history, and that "what is surprising is they persist. Either they are not good, or someone is poisoning them." Colombia's premiere weekly magazine also ran an op-ed which stated that Palestinian land has been occupied "since three thousand years ago, when Jews arrived there escaping from Egypt with Moses and Joshua, cutting heads and foreskins off of local inhabitants, Amalekites, Amorites, Canaanites, etc., to satisfy, they said, the demands of their bigoted one God who had appointed them his chosen people and had promised them all that foreign land." In Australia, The Sydney Morning Herald apologized after running a cartoon which was interpreted as antisemitic. Communications Minister Malcolm Turnbull had phoned the Herald's editor to express concern. On 19 July, Turkish daily newspaper Yeni Akit used a picture of Adolf Hitler as the centerpiece for its daily word game, and the phrase "We long for you" [Seni arıyoruz] as the answer to the puzzle.

=== Reaction of world leaders ===
UN chief Ban condemned the rise of antisemitism in a published statement, declaring that the conflict in the Middle East must not be used as a pretext for prejudice affecting social peace. The foreign ministers of France (Laurent Fabius), Germany (Frank-Walter Steinmeier) and Italy (Federica Mogherini) condemned antisemitic attacks and protests in a joint statement, saying "antisemitic rhetoric and hostility against Jews, attacks on people of Jewish belief and synagogues have no place in our societies." French president François Hollande declared that fighting antisemitism would be a "national cause". A spokesman for German Chancellor Angela Merkel stated that the Chancellor "sharply condemns the flare-up of violence and the antisemitic utterances" as "an attack on freedom and tolerance and an attempt to undermine our free democratic order. This is something we can't and won't accept."

=== Holocaust survivors ===
Many Holocaust survivors were among the elderly in Israel who donated money to help IDF soldiers in Gaza, totaling over 100,000 shekels, saying "It's the least we can do". Some individuals compared helping the IDF to helping allied soldiers during WWII, with one saying "Now we must contribute to soldiers that are protecting us. My husband was a pilot, he fought for four years during the war and was seriously wounded. For me, donating is not a mitzva but rather a duty." and another saying "I served as an officer and a military doctor in the Red Army in the Soviet Union. It's the least we can do in this difficult atmosphere of war. As long as there's a continued threat to Israel's existence, we must all pitch in order to protect it."

Other Holocaust survivors both inside and outside of Israel were shocked about the rising anti-Semitism masked as anti-Israel criticism, with one saying "It's ok not to agree with the Israeli government, like lots of people do over here. But if they are yelling 'kill all Jews' during protests, you haven't learned anything from the past." and another saying "I am deeply worried about the future of my children and grandchildren. Most of the elderly people are afraid. Everybody hates us. We are being surrounded by danger."

Nobel laureate Elie Wiesel said Hamas must stop using children as human shields, adding "Do the two cultures that brought us the Psalms of David and the rich libraries of the Ottoman Empire not share a love of life, of transmitting wisdom and opportunity to their children? And is any of this discernible in the dark future offered by Hamas to Arab children, to be suicide bombers or human shields for rockets? Palestinian parents want a hopeful future for their children, just like Israeli parents do. And both should be joining together in peace."

== See also ==
- International reactions to the Gaza war
