= International reactions to the E1 plan =

On 14 August 2025, Israel announced its intention to implement the E1 plan.

== Countries ==
=== Asia ===
Country	Reaction
Japan	The foreign secretary co-signed a joint statement condemning the plans.
Jordan	The Ministry of Foreign Affairs condemned the plans.
Saudi Arabia	The Ministry of Foreign Affairs condemned the plans.
Turkey	The Ministry of Foreign Affairs condemned the plans.
Qatar	The Ministry of Foreign Affairs condemned the plans.

=== Europe ===
Country	Reaction
Austria	The Ministry of Foreign Affairs condemned the plan as a violation of international law.
Belgium	The foreign secretary co-signed a joint statement condemning the plans.
Cyprus	The foreign secretary co-signed a joint statement condemning the plans.
Denmark	The foreign secretary co-signed a joint statement condemning the plans.
Estonia	The foreign secretary co-signed a joint statement condemning the plans.
Finland	The foreign secretary co-signed a joint statement condemning the plans.
France	The foreign secretary co-signed a joint statement condemning the plans.
Germany	The Federal Foreign Office condemned the plans.
Iceland	The foreign secretary co-signed a joint statement condemning the plans.
Ireland	The foreign secretary co-signed a joint statement condemning the plans.
Italy	The foreign secretary co-signed a joint statement condemning the plans.
Latvia	The foreign secretary co-signed a joint statement condemning the plans.
Lithuania	The foreign secretary co-signed a joint statement condemning the plans.
Luxembourg	The foreign secretary co-signed a joint statement condemning the plans.
Malta	The foreign secretary co-signed a joint statement condemning the plans.
Netherlands	The foreign secretary co-signed a joint statement condemning the plans.
Norway	The foreign secretary co-signed a joint statement condemning the plans.
Poland	The foreign secretary co-signed a joint statement condemning the plans.
Portugal	The foreign secretary co-signed a joint statement condemning the plans.
Russia	In 2012, Foreign Minister Sergey Lavrov said that the Russian Federation strongly opposed the plans.
Slovenia	The foreign secretary co-signed a joint statement condemning the plans.
Spain	The foreign secretary co-signed a joint statement condemning the plans.
Sweden	The foreign secretary co-signed a joint statement condemning the plans.
United Kingdom	Foreign Secretary David Lammy co-signed a joint statement condemning the plans.

=== North America ===
Country	Reaction
Canada	The foreign secretary co-signed a joint statement condemning the plans.

=== Oceania ===
Country	Reaction
Australia	The foreign secretary co-signed a joint statement condemning the plans.

== See also ==
- International reactions to the Gaza War (2023–)
- International reactions to the Gaza War (2014)
- International reactions to the Gaza War (2008–2009)
