= The Sunwise Turn =

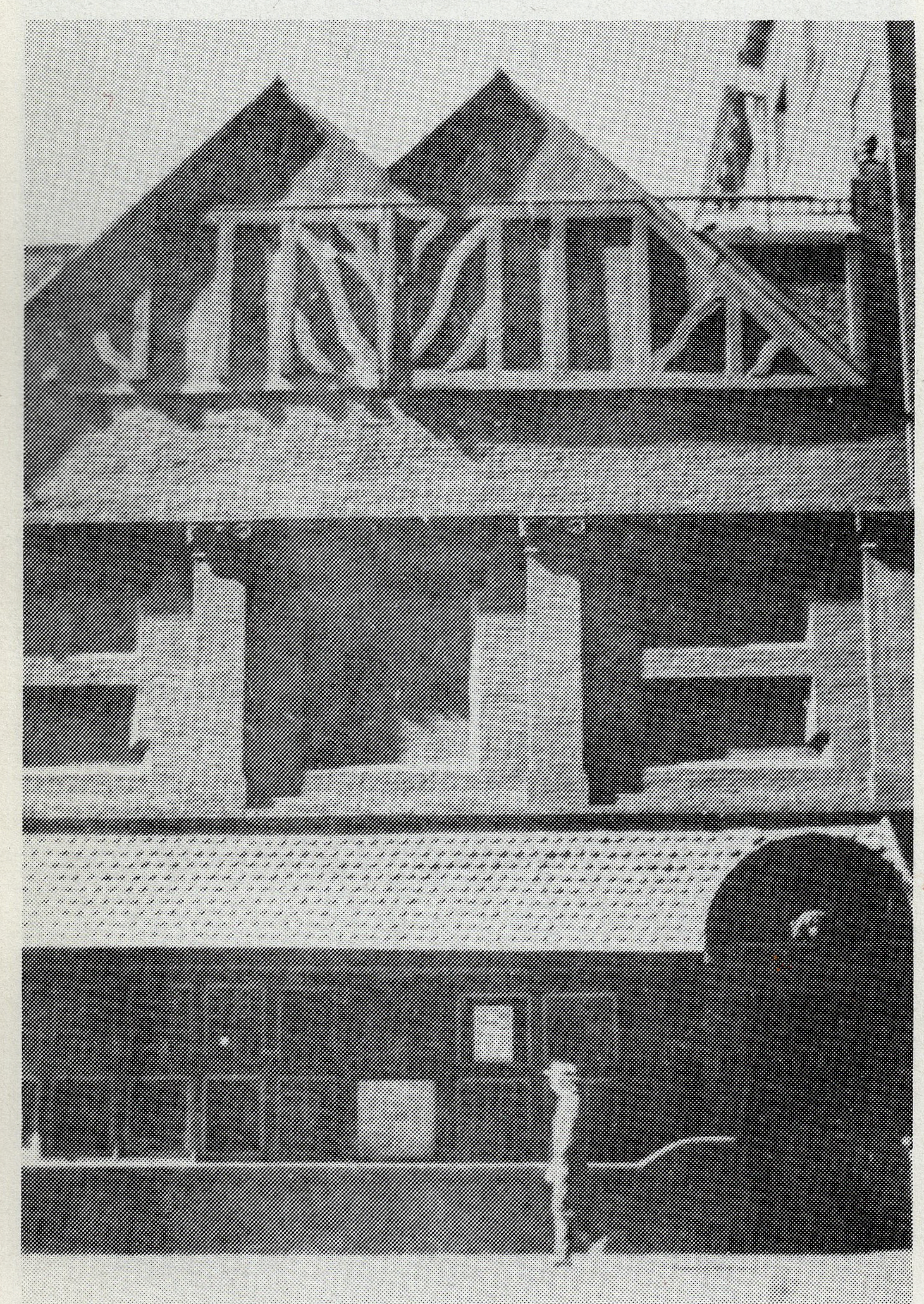
Sunwise Turn Bookstore at its original location at 2 E. 31st. St. circa 1916. Photograph from p. 16 of Beatrice Wood's autobiography, "I Shock Myself."

The Sunwise Turn was a bookshop in New York City that operated from 1916 to 1927 and served as a literary salon and gathering-place for F. Scott Fitzgerald, Alfred Kreymborg, Maxwell Bodenheim, Peggy Guggenheim (an intern in 1920), Theodore Dreiser, Robert Frost, Harold Loeb, John Dos Passos and others. It was founded by Madge Jenison and Mary Horgan Mowbray-Clarke, and was one of the first bookshops in America to be owned and operated by women. Papers pertaining to the Sunwise Turn and its founders are held by the Harry Ransom Center at the University of Texas at Austin.

Alfred R. Orage, a one-time student and teacher of the ideas of G.I. Gurdjieff, gave his first public lecture about Gurdjieff ideas at the Sunwise Turn, on January 9, 1924. Gurdjieff, himself, presented a lecture there on March 2, 1924.

The bookshop showed art as well as books; Guggenheim credited the shop with spurring her love of collecting.

== Publishing history ==
In addition to acting as an exhibition and performance space, the shop published five illustrated poetry broadsides and at least ten books between 1916 – 1923.

The broadsides were the first publishing venture undertaken by the shop, and each paired an artist with a poet. Issued sequentially in 1916, the broadside series featured poems and hand-colored drawings:

1. "Ballads for Sale" by Amy Lowell; drawing by Walt Kuhn
2. "The Scientist" by Gladys Cromwell; drawing by John Frederick Mowbray-Clarke
3. "Cow of Curses" by Amy Murray; drawing by Amy Murray
4. "The Bird Seller Praises his Bird of Paradise" by Padraic Colum; drawing by Herbert Crowley
5. "Chariots" by Witter Bynner; drawing by Howard Coluzzi.

1916 also saw the publication of Lord Dunsany's "A Night at an Inn" in conjunction with the Neighborhood Playhouse as "Neighborhood Playhouse Plays No. 1"

The Sunwise Turn pioneered the publication of Indian contemporary writing in America with two collections by Ananda Coomaraswamy "The Dance of Siva: Fourteen Indian Essays" and "Prayers and Epigrams."

== Locations ==
The initial location was 2 East 31st Street; in 1919 the shop moved to the Yale Club building at 51 East 44th Street, where it remained until it closed in 1927. Mowbray-Clarke, with the help of Harold and Marjorie Content Loeb, bought Jenison out in 1919/1920. (Jenison would go on to publish an account of the shop's early years, Sunwise Turn: A Human Comedy of Bookselling [E.P. Dutton, 1923]).

In 1923, Jessie Richards Dwight (1901–1985), from Albany, became a limited partner in the store. When in 1927 it proved to be insolvent, Mowbray-Clarke sold the firm with its stock to Doubleday, Page & Co. for $5,000 (~$72,448 in 2024).
