= Nancy Blanche Jenison =

1876-1960, physician

- Born: July 8, 1876 July 8, 1876; Republic, Ohio
- Died: November 7, 1960 (aged 84); New York City
- Education: Wells College, Johns Hopkins School of Medicine
- Occupation: Physician

Nancy Blanche Jenison (July 8, 1876 – November 7, 1960) was an American physician and advocate for social reform.

== Biography ==
Jenison was born in Republic, Ohio on July 8, 1876. She attended Wells College and spent several year teaching. At the age of 31 Jenison decided to become a physician and in 1911 she graduated from Johns Hopkins School of Medicine. She was one of the first 100 women to graduate from Hopkins, which began admitting women in 1893.

Jenison had a successful practice in New York City where she specialized in pediatrics. She was a member of the New York County Medical Society. She retired in 1931 and relocated to Washington, D.C. There she was involved in advocating for civil rights as well as serving in clinics and neighborhoods. She became a member of the Washington Ethical Society.

For a time Jenison returned to New York to care for her sister Madge Jenison (1874–1960). Jenison died in New York City, the same year as her sister on November 7, 1960.

Jension's estate was divided between establishing scholarships for women medical students at Johns Hopkins and providing funds for a new building at 7750 16th Street NW for the Washington Ethical Society.
