= Mary Horgan Mowbray-Clarke =

- Born: Mary Helena Bothwell Horgan; 1874; Nyack, New York
- Died: November 20, 1962 (aged 87–88); New City, New York
- Notable work: The Argonaut art history (1907), author; Dutch Garden in Rockland County, landscape architect
- Spouse: John Frederick Mowbray-Clarke

Mary Horgan Mowbray-Clarke (1874–1962) was an American art critic, writer, publisher, instructor, landscape architect, and the proprietor of The Sunwise Turn, a hotbed of artistic activity and anarchist political thought in New York City during the nineteen-teens and twenties. She was also the wife of John Frederick Mowbray-Clarke, a sculptor who helped organize of the influential 1913 Armory Show exhibition of modern art.

== Biography and career ==
Mowbray-Clarke was born in Nyack, New York in 1874. She attended the Art Students League of New York as a girl of 16. It was there that she met Arthur B. Davies in 1888; the two became romantically involved, and Davies introduced her to a number of art world notables.

In 1899, Horgan became the governess to Gladys and Dorothea Cromwell and would maintain a mentor and protege like relationship with both sisters throughout their lives.

In 1907, she published her first book, The Argonaut art history.

Mowbray-Clarke and Madge Jenison opened The Sunwise Turn in 1916, on Thirty-first Street just east of Fifth Avenue in New York City. Davies designed the interior, which was "burning orange," while the sign in front was created by the artist Henry Fitch Taylor. In 1919, the shop relocated to 51 East Forty-fourth Street, part of the Yale Club building.

The bookshop served as an important intellectual and social center for artists, writers, and revolutionary political thinkers in New York. In addition to selling books, art, textiles, and sculpture, The Sunwise Turn published small editions (including the first edition of The Dance of Siva: Fourteen Indian Essays by Ananda Coomaraswamy, introducing the American public to Indian art and culture, as well as volumes by Witter Bynner, Rainer Maria Rilke, and Lord Edward John Dunsany) and hosted readings and literary events with Robert Frost, Amy Lowell, Lola Ridge, and Alfred Kreymborg. In 1920, a young Peggy Guggenheim went to work as an unpaid assistant in the shop, absorbing Mowbray-Clarke's influence and being first exposed to the avant-garde artists and writers who would come to shape her world as a patron. The bookshop closed for business in 1927, and the corporation was dissolved in 1928.

The Mowbray-Clarkes lived in Rockland County, New York at a farm and studio called Brocken, just six miles from Davies. Like the Sunwise Turn, Brocken became a social center for exchange of political ideas from socialism to anarchism, and a place for communion between "free spirits."

In the 1930s and 40s, Mary Mowbray-Clarke established herself as a landscape architect, designing the award-winning Dutch Garden in Rockland County, as well as a number of gardens found in homes near that area.

Mowbray-Clarke died in 1962, in New City, New York. She was survived by her son, John Bothwell Mowbray-Clarke of Bethesda Maryland, and two granddaughters.

The archival materials of John and Mary Mowbray-Clarke, and of the Sunwise Turn Bookshop are held by the Harry Ransom Center at the University of Texas at Austin and in the Archives of American Art, Smithsonian Institution in Washington, D.C.
