= 535 Park Avenue =

Apartment building in Manhattan, New York

- Interactive map of the 535 Park Avenue area

General information
- Coordinates: 40°45′51″N 73°58′07″W
- Year built: 1910

Technical details
- Floor count: 15

Design and construction
- Architect: Herbert Lucas

535 Park Avenue is a pre-war cooperative apartment building at the northeast corner of 61st Street and Park Avenue, in the Lenox Hill section of the Upper East Side of Manhattan in New York City. It was constructed in 1910 and was designed by architect Herbert Lucas.

== Architecture ==
Its architectural design and decoration was described as both Georgian and Colonial style at the time of its completion. Herbert Lucas used similar architectural features from 24 Gramercy Park South, a building he designed, including the splayed lintels, simple brick and half-oval balconies.

A characteristic feature of this particular building is the white glazed terra-cotta of the two lower floors that contrasts with the red brick from the upper floors. Some critics were offended by this contrast, denouncing the terra-cotta as “cheap finery” and qualifying the building as “Palazzo Spotti.”

== History ==
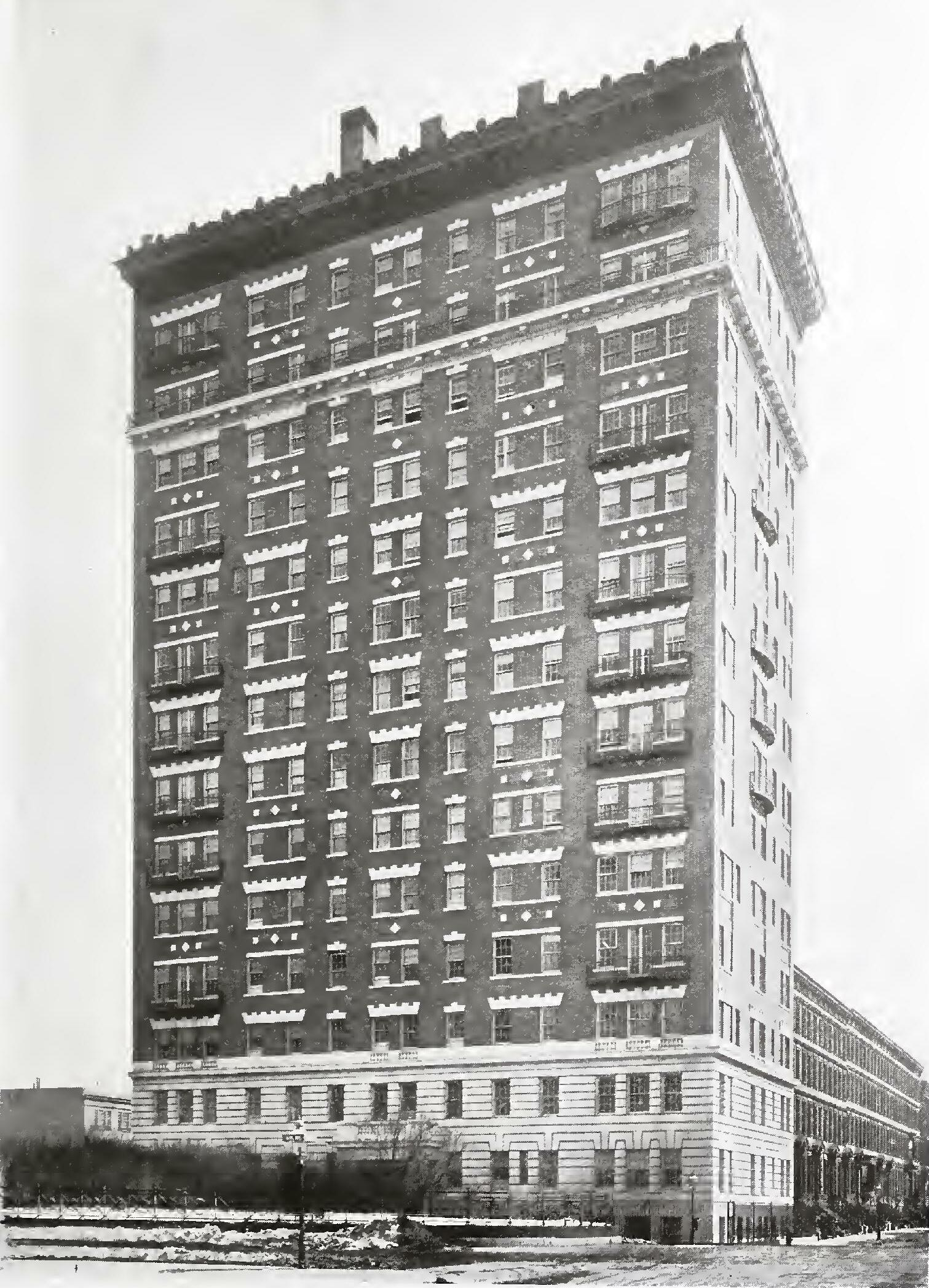
The building in 1911.

The project started when the site at the corner of 61st Street and Park Avenue was acquired in early 1909 by a corporation known as Number 535 Park Avenue. The project was viewed as a step to reimprove the north section of Park Avenue.

The construction project was unusual at the time in the sense that it was led by a corporation of its future owners instead of being led by a real estate developer. The future owners were organized as a housing cooperative, which was uncommon at the time. Unlike contemporary co-op buildings where most of their units are owned, in early co-op buildings half of its units were being rented by the owners.

== Residents ==
Notable residents include American painter Lydia Field Emmet and Gladys Cromwell.
