= Israeli Elite Force =

Hacktivist group

- iEF Logo
- Abbreviation: iEF
- Formation: April 2013
- Type: Hacking
- Volunteers: 17
- Website: Official Twitter Feed Official Facebook Page

Israeli Elite Force (iEF) is a hacktivist group founded two days before OpIsrael on April 5, 2013, that is responsible for multiple high-profile computer attacks and large scale online vandalism. Targets include ISPs, domain registrars, commercial websites, educational institutions, and government agencies. The group's core members are: mitziyahu, Buddhax, amenefus, bl4z3, r3str1ct3d, Mute, Cyb3rS74r, Oshrio, Aph3x, xxtr, Kavim, md5c, prefix, Cpt|Sparrow, gal-, gr1sha, nyxman and TheGodOfHell.

== Views ==
The group is led by Mitziyahu, naming himself co-ordinator, instead of leader. Stating in interviews for The Daily Beast, Israeli Channel 2 News, and more, that the mission of the iEF is to regain the Israeli citizen confidence of their hackers.

== OpIsrael Opposition ==
OpIsrael was a coordinated cyberattack by anti-Israel groups and individuals against websites they perceived as Israeli, chiefly through denial-of-service attacks. Timed for 7 April 2013, the eve of Holocaust Remembrance Day, its stated goal was to "erase Israel from the internet". Israeli Elite Force had an early start forming two days prior to the attack, taking down websites.

== OpIslam ==
The groups has organized a preemptive attack known as OpIslam to start a day earlier of OpIsrael. Groups known to join iEF at the planned operations include: sTz Hackers, MiSa3L Hacker Team and some single hackers. Cyber War New website released a summary of attacks which lists the attacks and counterattacks, named Operation Israel Reloaded. The OpIslam attack has received some criticism for being somewhat offensive with this said preemptive attack, as opposed to the groups usual defensive actions.

== OpBirthControl - OpIsraelBirthday opposition ==
Upon planning of the OpIsraelBirthday by anti-Israeli teams on April 7, 2014, iEF launched OpBirthControl, having several groups and individuals joining them.

On this op the Israeli Elite Force decided to focus its energy on exposing participants of the anti-Israel hacks. The iEF hacked named Buddhax published a PDF document with a list of hackers and personal information including pictures of them taken from their computers. The PDF document has created a "buzz" being twitted by famous hacker The Jester, and celebrity Roseanne Barr, and being talked about in the media. The group also released 45,000 usernames and passwords of government officials at the Gaza Ministry of Health

== Palestinian Population Database Leak ==
On another counter-op named No. OpIsraelRetaliate, the IEF leaked a database file of the Palestinian Authority Population Registry. This action was referred to as unprecedented by Israeli data security experts. At the same counter-op, the group also leaked Palestinian Authority unemployment office information containing 38,000 names and personal data of 700 job holders in the Palestinian Authority.

== OpAnonymousCounterOffensive ==
Although the Israeli Elite Force (i.E.F.) has not been noticeably active in 2024, a hacker group named WitherSec has claimed to have accomplished joint operations in partnership with the Israeli Elite Force (i.E.F.). WitherSec carried out attacks against the infamous hacker group Anonymous. WitherSec carried out attacks such as the hacking of personal and/or organization social media accounts, defacing websites, DDOS attacks, data breaches, and doxes against members of Anonymous and other hacker groups in retaliation to Anonymous and other hacker groups publicly recruiting people to criminally attack and inflict damage on Israeli government systems, websites, and pro Israel organizations.
