= Plays of Gods and Men =

Plays of Gods and Men (1917) was the Anglo-Irish writer Lord Dunsany's second collection of plays. It includes A Night at an Inn, perhaps his most popular dramatic work. All four of the plays had been or were later to be presented on the stage with acclaim from audiences and theatre critics, finding especial popularity in the United States.

== Contents ==
- Preface
- The Laughter of the Gods [in 3 acts]
- The Queen's Enemies [in 1 act]
- The Tents of the Arabs [in 2 acts]
- A Night at an Inn [in 1 act]

== Composition ==
All of the constituent plays were written quite rapidly: the two acts of The Tents of the Arabs on 3 September and 8 September 1910 respectively; The Laughter of the Gods between 29 January and 3 February 1911; A Night at an Inn on 17 January 1912 (between tea and dinner according to Dunsany's biographer Mark Amory); and The Queen's Enemies between 19 April and 29 April 1913. Dunsany subsequently made many revisions to the text, including the addition of a page of dialogue to The Laughter of the Gods, for later US editions.

== Publication ==
One of the plays contained in Plays of Gods and Men, The Tents of the Arabs, had previously appeared in the March 1915 issue of The Smart Set. Another, A Night at an Inn, was published as a booklet by The Sunwise Turn bookshop in November 1916. Plays of Gods and Men itself appeared in 1917 under the imprint of the Talbot Press in Dublin, T. Fisher Unwin in London, and John W. Luce in Boston. There were multiple re-editions on both sides of the Atlantic by G. P. Putnam's Sons in the 1920s. In modern times it has been reissued by Core Collection Books in 1977, Wildside Press in 2002, BiblioBazaar in 2008, Floating Press in 2014, Start Classics in 2014, Positronic Publishing in 2015, and General Books in 2020.

== First performances ==
The Tents of the Arabs was submitted to Dunsany's friend W. B. Yeats at the Abbey Theatre in Dublin, but was refused by him. It was played first at Le Petit Théâtre Anglais in Paris in April 1914, with great success, then in Detroit at the Arts and Crafts Theatre, a "little theatre", in November 1916, again successfully.

A Night at an Inn was premiered at the Neighbourhood Theatre in New York on 13 May 1916, with an amateur cast. According to contemporary newspaper accounts the production was "the sensation of the hour", the audience being "half-hysterical with excitement".

The Neighbourhood Theatre also gave the first production of The Queen's Enemies on 14 November 1916, in a triple bill with two plays by George Bernard Shaw. Though popular with audiences there, the critics generally agreed with Alexander Woollcott that it was "Dunsany at his second best". The production nevertheless transferred to Maxine Elliott's Theatre on Broadway.

The Laughter of the Gods, the only one of the Plays of Gods and Men not to have been performed by the time the book was published, finally reached the stage in January 1919 at the Portmanteau Theatre in New York, where it was a moderate success.

== Contemporary reception ==
The book was received favourably by some critics. The Spectator asserted that "All who delight in Lord Dunsany's strange fantastic imagination will give a warm welcome to this collection of four of his plays". The Belfast News Letter thought it "a literary pleasure to read these trifles". The New Statesman's reviewer came to the conclusion that "Maeterlinck and the Grand Guignol, with a touch of the Flaubert of the Tentation de St Antoine – that, perhaps, is the nearest formula for a Dunsany play." The Boston Transcript believed that The Tents of the Arabs, with its "poetic charm", was "one of the most beautiful things which Lord Dunsany has ever written".

Reviews often distinguished between A Night at an Inn on the one hand, and the remaining three plays on the other, reserving most of their praise for the former. The Athenaeum considered The Tents of the Arabs, The Queen's Enemies and The Laughter of the Gods, "too poetical to be in prose...Prose belongs to realism" rather than these plays' ideality. "His dialogues are rather tedious, his plots are thin, and his dramatic situations are wanting in grip, wrote The Outlook. "The frequent repetition of words and phrases in [these] three plays reminds one of Maeterlinck – there is a great deal of palaver and very little result".

With respect to A Night at an Inn, The Spectator declared that its "subtle horror" would "make it difficult for the reader to put it aside until the last word has been read". "Nothing since 'The ghost stories of an antiquary'", confessed The Times Literary Supplement, "has frightened us quite so uncannily." Another reviewer called it a "perfect melodrama". Even The Outlook conceded that "with really good acting [it] might be interesting".

In the years that followed, Dunsany was considered one of the world's leading playwrights and according to S. T. Joshi won, partly as a result of Plays of Gods and Men, "an adulation that today's rock stars would envy". Edward Hale Bierstadt, in his study Dunsany the Dramatist (1917, rev. ed. 1919), described A Night at an Inn as "really marvellous", a model of construction from which not a word could be subtracted without loss; The Queen's Enemies as an interesting story told with drama, atmosphere, and colour, flawed by unclear motivation in the central character; The Tents of the Arabs as more a beautiful poem than a play; and The Laughter of the Gods as "a curious blending of farce and drama, of satire and tragedy, which no one else could write, and which no one else would have written." H. P. Lovecraft, writing in 1922, rated both A Night at an Inn and The Queen's Enemies "marvellously powerful plays". Ludwig Lewisohn considered the book to be the work of a born storyteller: "You are breathless over his tales". He particularly singled out "that lovely play" The Tents of the Arabs and The Laughter of the Gods, in which he found "that overwhelming sense of the inscrutable and relentless character of human fate which he has found so fruitful an artistic mood." This collection and his earlier Five Plays, as set books in schools, became two of his most widely read works.
