= Rockland County Courthouse and Dutch Gardens =

- U.S. National Register of Historic Places
- U.S. Historic district
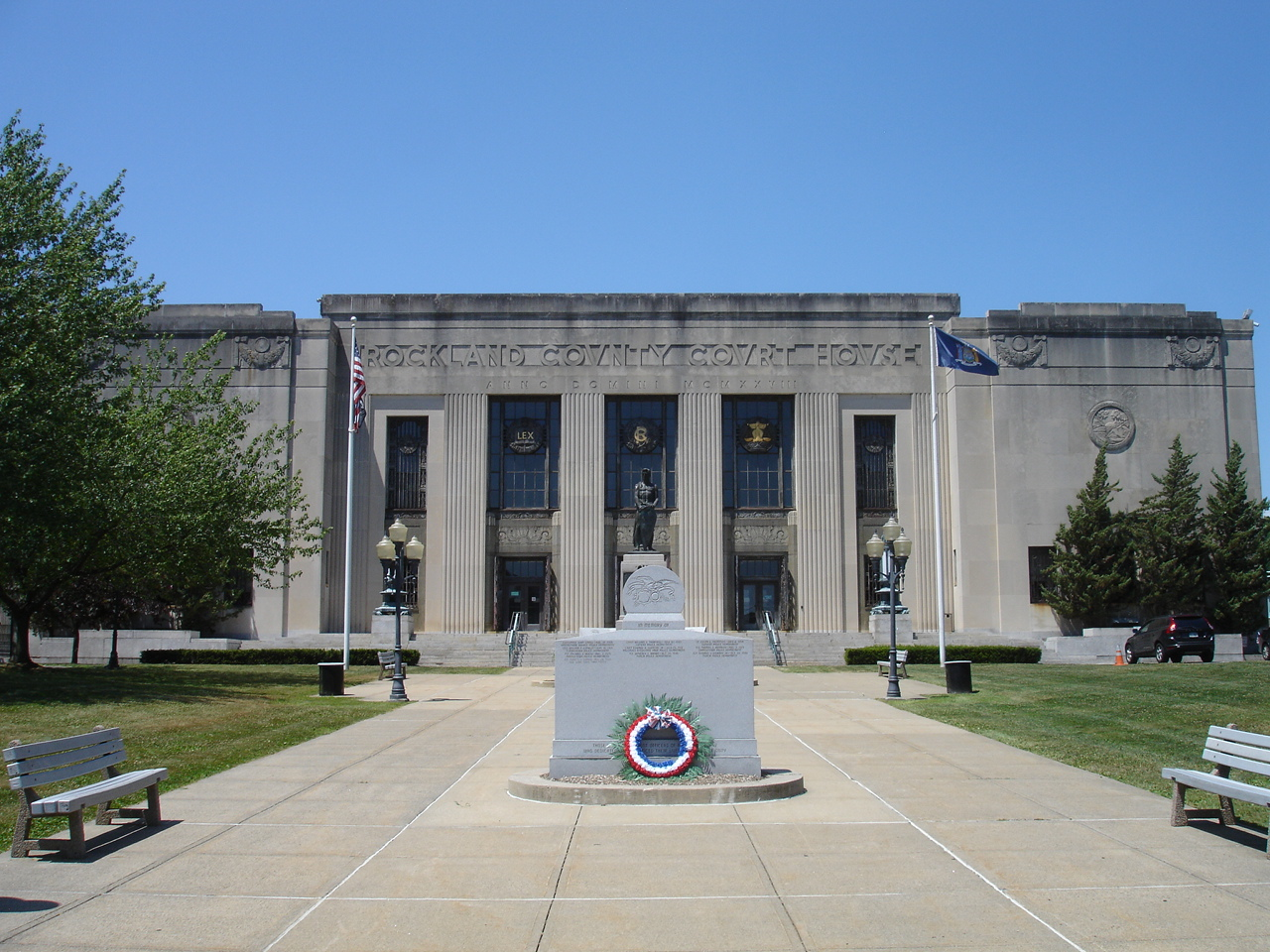
- The Rockland County Courthouse in July 2012

- Location within New York Location within the United States
- Interactive map showing the location for Rockland County Courthouse
- Location: Jct. of S. Main St. and New Hempstead Rd., New City, New York
- Coordinates: 41°8′47″N 73°59′27″W
- Area: 7.8 acres (3.2 ha)
- Built: 1928
- Architect: Dennison & Hirons; Mowbray-Clarke, Mary Horgan
- Architectural style: Beaux Arts, Art Deco
- NRHP reference No.: 90002104
- Added to NRHP: January 3, 1991

Rockland County Courthouse and Dutch Gardens is a historic county courthouse, public garden, and national historic district located at New City in Rockland County, New York. The district has two contributing buildings, one contributing site, five contributing structures, and two contributing objects.

The courthouse building was built in 1928 and is a three-story, symmetrical building built of Indiana limestone in a transitional Beaux-Arts / Art Deco style. The interior features a large three-story lobby that extends across the front of the building to the two flanking pavilions. On the front facade is the county World War I Memorial.

The Dutch Garden was designed by Mary Horgan Mowbray-Clarke (1874–1962), a West Nyack native and wife of the sculptor John Mowbray-Clarke, in 1933–34 and constructed between 1934 and 1938 as a Works Progress Administration project. It was built as a memorial to the county's early settlers and was designed in the formal 17th century Dutch tradition. The Dutch Garden won "Garden of the Year" from Better Home and Gardens magazine in 1935. Master craftsman Biaglo Gugliuzzo of Garnerville created walks and latticed walls of Haverstraw brick.

It was the only W.P.A. landscape architecture project designed and supervised by a woman. The garden features a one-story tea house whose interior features a brick fireplace with carvings of mountains, windmills and other serene symbols representing aspects of Dutch-American history, others of motifs popular in 1930s: Popeye, the Baker Cocoa and Old Dutch Cleanser maids. Also in the garden is a bandstand, a serpentine brick wall, and a small round brick table. It has been said that folk singer Burl Ives once performed there and that Eleanor Roosevelt visited the garden. The life size statue of Thurgood Marshall Human Rights Monument is located here. Markers on site. Now a county park with beautiful display of flowering bulbs in spring. It was listed on the National Register of Historic Places in 1991. It was purchased by the county in 2008 and has been renovated since.

== See also ==
- National Register of Historic Places listings in Rockland County, New York
