= Madge Jenison =

American novelist

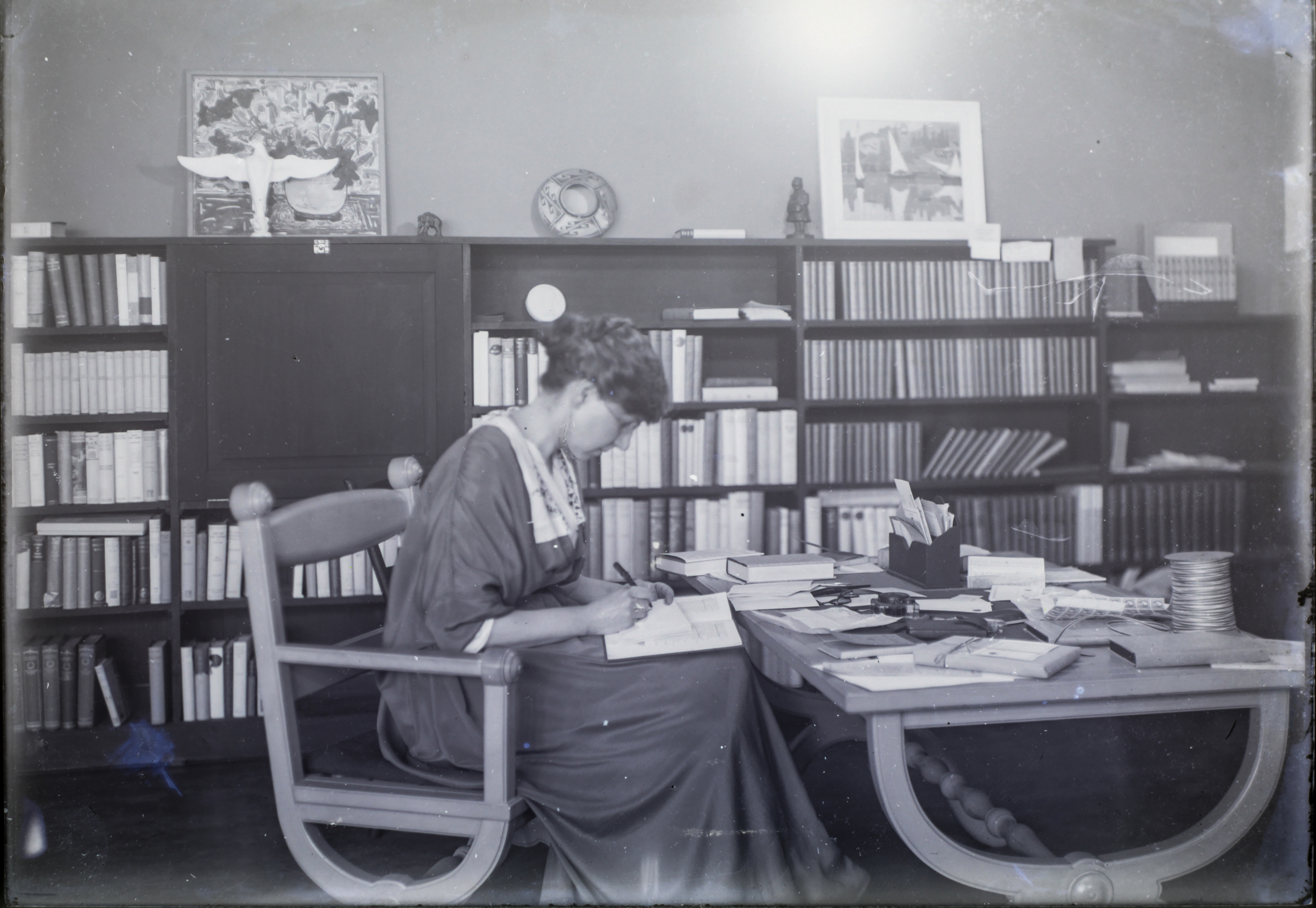
Madge Jenison in the Sunwise Turn Bookstore circa 1916

Madge Jenison (1874–1960) was an American author, activist, and bookstore owner. She wrote novels, short stories, cultural criticism, and scripts. Her father, Edward Spencer Jenison, was a prominent Chicago architect who helped rebuild the city after The Great Chicago Fire of 1871. Her sister, Nancy Blanche Jenison, was a pioneering woman physician.

In the early years of the 20th century Madge Jenison moved from Chicago to New York, where she found success with writing, primarily for magazines.

She soon met sculptor John Frederick Mowbray-Clarke, at a dinner given by "some liberal group". He was immediately taken with her, later telling his wife, Mary Horgan Mowbray-Clarke, that he had been seated between "two of the most interesting women in America." One was the biographer Katharine Anthony; the other was Madge Jenison.

In late 1915, she conceived the idea that "a bookshop of a different kind must be opened in America." Jenison co-founded The Sunwise Turn, a Modern Bookshop with Mary Horgan Mowbray-Clarke in a leased building at 2 E. 31st. Besides offering books which interested them personally they also held readings and sold paintings, prints, sculptures and textiles in the small shop. The Sunwise Turn was one of the first bookstores in the America to be run by women, and Jenison wrote in 1923 that "In the winter of 1919 - 20 we had eight unpaid apprentices - all women of a great deal of background. They sold thousands of dollars worth of books for us. They filed invoices. They swept floors. They ran on errands." One of their unpaid interns was Peggy Guggenheim. Working as an apprentice at the Sunwise Turn, she absorbed much about avant-garde culture, and it was there that she was introduced to the poet Margaret Anderson. Harold Loeb wrote of her at this time "Coming under Mary Clarke's spell Peggy gradually discarded many traditional taboos and adopted a whole set of new ones. Feeling guilty, no doubt, for having inherited wealth, she came to deny herself some of the luxuries to which she was accustomed In compensation she collected the latest in experimental painting and gave money and meals to poor artists and writers."

Arthur Davies, a principal organizer of the 1913 Armory Show along with John Frederick Mowbray-Clarke, was the designer of the interior of the shop. He chose a "burning orange" color for the walls and worked a prism of colors into the woodwork. Artists and writers featured at the bookshop included Theodore Dreiser, who gave the first reading on April 30. 1916. Robert Frost also gave a reading, as well as a host of others, both well-known and unknown. They showed work by artists such as William Zorach, Martha Ryther, Charles Burchfield, and Herbert E. Crowley.

Jenison wrote that "At the end of four years we had branches in Detroit, in the Neighborhood Playhouse, and the Theatre Guild. We had sold books at garden lectures at the Colony Club, at the Socialist and Civil Liberties Conventions, at the International Conference of Women Physicians."

The Sunwise Turn also published a "broadsheet" which included poetry and art, as well as political and social commentary by various authors and artists. They also published full-length books in small editions, including a 500-copy edition of a study of sculptor Auguste Rodin by Rainer Maria Rilke in 1919.

Periodicals to which Jenison contributed short stories and social commentary included Harper's Monthly, and The Atlantic in the early 1900s, as well as in later years. She published several books in her lifetime: Dominance (1928), Invitation to the Dance (1929), Roads (1949), and her account of the early years of the Sunwise Turn, Sunwise Turn: A Human Comedy of Bookselling (1923).

Jenison earned recognition in the Woman’s Who’s Who of America, and was captain 25 Assembly District (N.Y. City) Woman Suffrage Party. She marched in an autumn 1917 women's suffrage parade, representing women booksellers, who at the time were occasionally allowed to join the Bookseller's League events, but were prohibited from joining. She organized 16 women to participate in the march, but was dismayed at the lack of organization among them. This led to a November 13, 1917, meeting which marked the beginning of the Women's National Book Association (WNBA).

She was never married.
