= OpIsrael =

Anti-Israel cyberattack campaign

- Native name: #OpIsrael
- Date: Annually (since 2013)
- Location: Israel (cyberspace)
- Type: Coordinated cyberattack campaign DDoS attacks Website defacement
- Motive: Pro-Palestinian activism
- Target: Israeli government websites, private websites
- Organised by: Anonymous-affiliated hacktivists
- Participants: Anonymous and affiliated hacktivist groups
- Outcome: Minimal disruption; assessed as largely unsuccessful by Israeli authorities

OpIsrael is an annual coordinated cyberattack where hacktivists attack Israeli government and even private websites with DDoS attacks and more. The inaugural campaign was launched in 2013 by Anonymous hackers on the eve of Holocaust Remembrance Day. The campaign has since been held annually.

The inaugural OpIsrael was reported to have no physical damage and was assessed by the Israeli Government's National Cyber Bureau and by all security experts and journalists to have been a failure.

== Targeted websites ==
Larger than Life, an Israeli NGO devoted to "improving the quality of life and welfare of cancer-stricken children and their families regardless of sex, religion and nationality", stated that in the week leading up to #OpIsrael, its website was targeted repeatedly by pro-Palestinian hackers who defaced it with "flags, a skull, symbols, and all sorts of hate-related things".

In the leadup to the attack, Israeli organizations made preparations to defend their websites, and cyber-security experts called on home users to increase awareness and take precautions such as changing passwords, not opening strange or suspicious emails, and maintaining especial vigilance when using Facebook. The Israel Internet Association (ISOC) operated a hotline for people to report attacks and published real-time status reports on its website.

Yad Vashem, Israel's national Holocaust museum, came under a "fairly massive attack". Nevertheless, its website was fully operational on the day of the attack, which overlapped with Holocaust Remembrance Day.

At midday, #OpIsrael activists announced on Twitter that they had defaced the website of an Israeli hair salon, Peter Hair, in Ramat HaSharon. The salon's home page showed a masked person holding a sign saying "Indonesian Security Down #OP ISRAHELL" and was signed with the message "We are Muslims, Soldier [sic] of Allah". The owner of the salon, Peter Imseis, said he had not been aware that the site had been hacked and that it had not affected his business.

Government websites that experienced problems on 7 April 2013 included those of the Israeli Ministry of Education and Central Bureau of Statistics, but it was unclear whether these problems were caused by #OpIsrael.

During the day, attackers posted numerous false and grandiose claims of successes, such as "Anonymous causes Israel to lose $5 billion" in stock market losses and "Tel Aviv loses all Internet connection".

== Responses ==
The attack was praised by Hamas, the militant Terrorist organisation that controls the Gaza Strip. Hamas spokesman Ihab al-Ghussain wrote: "May God protect the spirit and mission of the soldiers of this electronic war".
