= John Frederick Mowbray-Clarke =

American sculptor

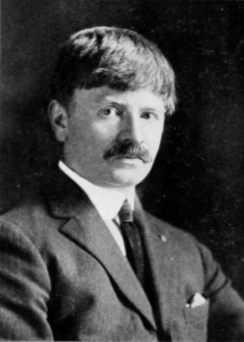
- Born: August 4, 1869; Jamaica
- Died: 1953 (aged 83–84)
- Known for: Sculptor
- Spouse: Mary Horgan Mowbray-Clarke

John Frederick Mowbray-Clarke (1869–1953) was an American sculptor specializing in medals. Mowbray-Clarke was one of the organizers of the influential 1913 Armory Show in New York.

== Biography ==
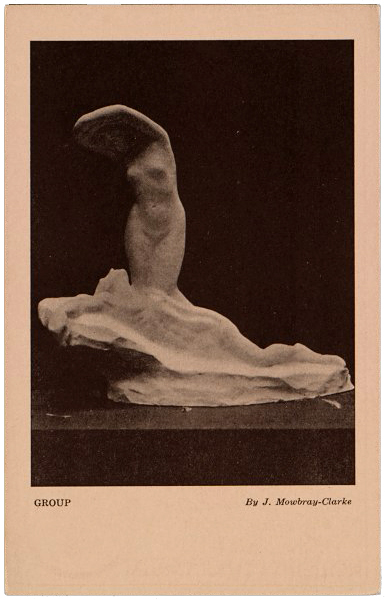
Postcard to promote the Armory Show featuring a sculpture, Group, by Mowbray-Clarke; from the Archives of American Art

Mowbray-Clarke was born in Jamaica on August 4, 1869.

His wife, Mary Horgan Mowbray-Clarke, was an art critic, instructor, the co-owner of the Sunwise Turn bookshop at 2 East 31st Street in New York City. She was also a prominent anarchist, interested in fomenting political and social revolution. She ran the Sunwise Turn with Madge Jenison, and the bookshop served as an important intellectual and social center for artists, writers, and revolutionary political thinkers in New York in the early nineteen-teens and twenties. In addition to selling books, art, textiles, and sculpture, Sunwise Turn published small editions (including the first edition of The Dance of Siva: Fourteen Indian Essays by Ananda Coomaraswamy, introducing the American public to Indian art and culture) and hosted readings and literary events until it closed in 1927.

The Mowbray-Clarkes lived in Rockland County, New York at a farm and studio called Brocken, just six miles from Arthur B. Davies. Like the Sunwise Turn, Brocken became a social center for exchange of political ideas from socialism to anarchism, and a place for communion between "free spirits." Mary Horgan had been romantically involved with Davies when he was at the Art Students League of New York, and Davies paid regular visits to Brocken.

In the 1930s and 40s Mary Mowbray-Clarke established herself as an award-winning landscape architect, designing public spaces in Rockland County.

John Mowbray-Clarke died in 1953.

== Artistic career ==
John Mowbray-Clarke was a pupil at the Lambeth School of Art, London, and worked primarily in New York.

In 1911, Mowbray-Clarke joined the Association of American Painters and Sculptors, the group that organized the groundbreaking 1913 Armory Show exhibition of modern art in New York. Unbeknownst to other committee members, Davies and Mowbray-Clarke both offered their homes and farms as collateral against any financial loss from the exhibition. In the end, however, the exhibition was a financial and cultural success.

Mowbray-Clarke exhibited several works in the Armory Show, including a plaster sculpture entitled Whither. He also showed a 4.5-inch portrait medal featuring the bust of fellow exhibition organizer Arthur B. Davies. Two examples of Mowbray-Clarke's early bronze medals from this era are in the Peabody Art collection of the State of Maryland: St. Brendan, 1911, and Peace for One Hundred Years (undated).

In 1919, the Kevorkian Gallery in New York City published an exhibition catalog of Mowbray-Clarke's work, which includes reproductions of his sculpture and medals. The catalog lists a total of seventy-three works, and reveals a radical evolution in Mowbray-Clarke's style during the nineteen-teens. Early works were executed in a small scale and had a rough finish, in a manner that "emphasized the artist's hand." By contrast, later sculptures such as Broadway, c. 1919–which the artist intended to be 40 feet high and ideally stand in Times Square–were executed on a monumental scale, and featured a smooth and refined finish. According to the critical essays in the catalog, Mowbray-Clarke is depicted as an idealistic individualist, whose work offers metaphoric social and political commentary; topics of his sculptures included satirical critiques of capitalism, militarism, and other aspects of Western society.

The John and Mary Mowbray-Clarke Papers are held by the Archives of American Art, Smithsonian Institution in Washington, D.C.
