= Metzad Mahmal =

Human settlement in Israel

- מצד מחמל (Hebrew)
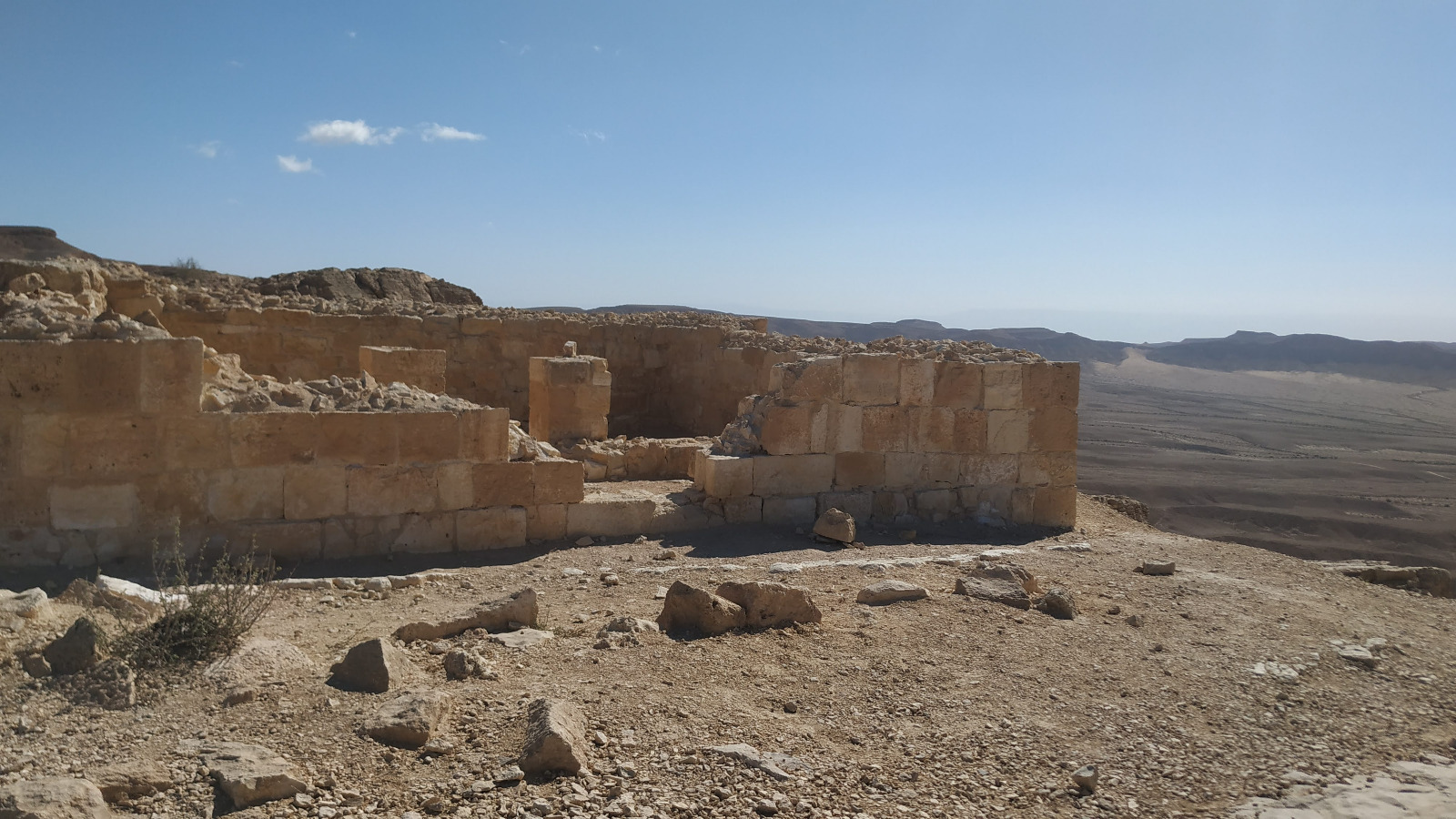
- Metzad Mahmal stronghold ruins

- Location within Israel
- 30.688°N 34.9286°E
- Type: Settlement
- Cultures: Nabataean, Roman
- Location: Southern District, Israel
- Region: Negev

History
- Built: 1st century AD

Site notes
- Condition: In ruins

UNESCO World Heritage Site
- Official name: Incense Route - Desert Cities in the Negev (Haluza, Mamshit, Avdat and Shivta)
- Type: Cultural
- Criteria: iii, v
- Designated: 2005 (29th session)
- Reference no.: 1107

Metzad Mahmal is the ruins of a stronghold located on the edge of the northern cliff of the Ramon Crater, at the top end of Ma'ale Mahmal (מעלה מחמל, "Mahmal Ascent") and is part of the Incense Route that runs between Petra and Avdat.

== Geography ==
Ma'ale Mahmal is the steep section, where the Incense Route overcomes the main natural obstacle in its path, the northern cliff of Ramon Crater. The ascent is a narrow path, about 200 meters long, that goes up to the top of the cliff. This climb is one of the most difficult sections of the Incense Route, as its average width is one meter, and it requires walking in a row of both people and pack animals. Most probably, the fundamental work of clearing the path and adapting it to regular caravan traffic was done by the Romans, who improved the ancient Nabatean route.

== Site research ==
The site was first surveyed in 1937 by George Kirk, who was also the first to survey Ma'ale Machmel. In 1960, the site was surveyed by Beno Rothenberg and Mordechai Gichon. In 1965, a test excavation was conducted at the site by an archaeologist of the Negev District of the Antiquities Authority, Rudolf Cohen, as part of a survey of the Incense Route between Shaar Ramon and Avdat. In December 1982, a rescue excavation was conducted at the site, under the direction of Cohen.

In May 2004, another rescue excavation was conducted at the site on behalf of the Israel Antiquities Authority. In this excavation, the outer western and northern walls of the stronghold were cleaned, and another building on the site damaged by archaeological looting was examined. Additional buildings were also excavated to the north and west of the site.

== Findings ==
A building was discovered at the site that previously included two floors, measuring 7 meters by 6.5 meters and containing two rooms. The first and older floor is dated based on the ceramics to the first century AD, and the later one is dated based on late Nabatean ceramics and two coins of Roman emperor Gallienus to the third century AD.

About 500 meters north of the stronghold is a built water pool, measuring 8 meters by 4.8 meters, whose capacity probably exceeded 150 cubic meters. It was covered by a stone ceiling supported by arches, and was filled by a drainage canal, which descends to it from the northeast.
