= Incense trade route =

Ancient trade road that connected Mediterranean ports to India via Africa and Arabia

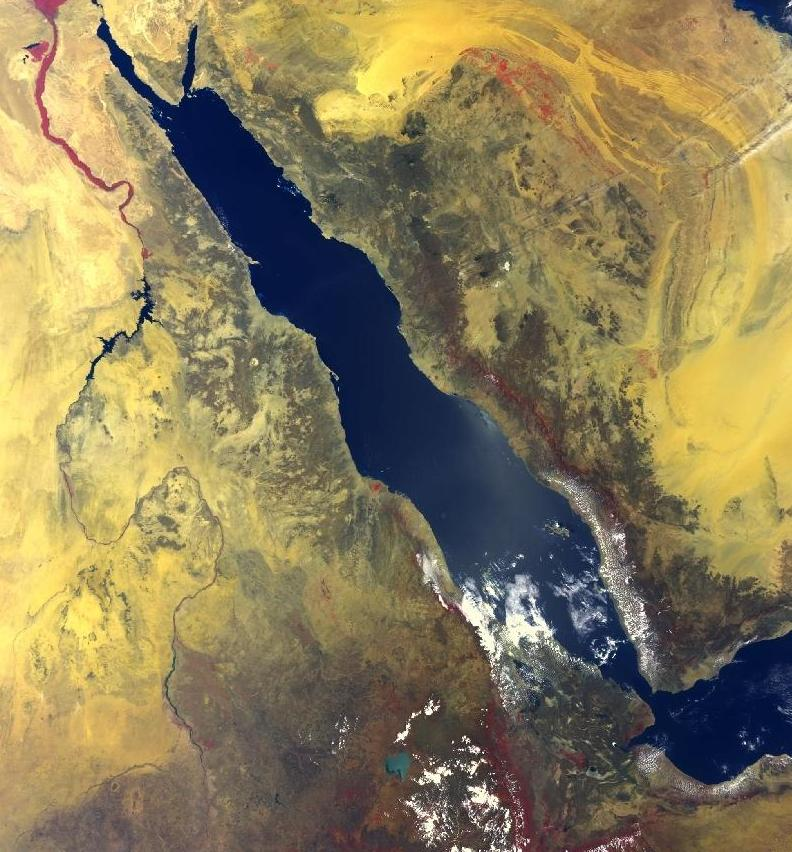
Satellite view of the Red Sea and adjacent lands. The incense trade, connecting the Mediterranean world to the incense-producing lands, depended heavily on navigation along the Red Sea.

The incense trade route was an ancient network of major land and sea trading routes linking the Mediterranean world with eastern and southern sources of incense, spices and other luxury goods, stretching from Mediterranean ports across the Levant and Egypt through Northeast Africa and Arabia —through both the sea and the land along the Red Sea— to India and beyond. These routes collectively served as channels for the trading of goods such as Arabian frankincense and myrrh; Indian spices, precious stones, pearls, ebony, silk and fine textiles; and from the Horn of Africa, rare woods, feathers, animal skins, Somali frankincense, gold, and slaves. The incense land trade from South Arabia to the Mediterranean flourished between roughly the 3rd century BC and the 2nd century AD.

== Early history ==
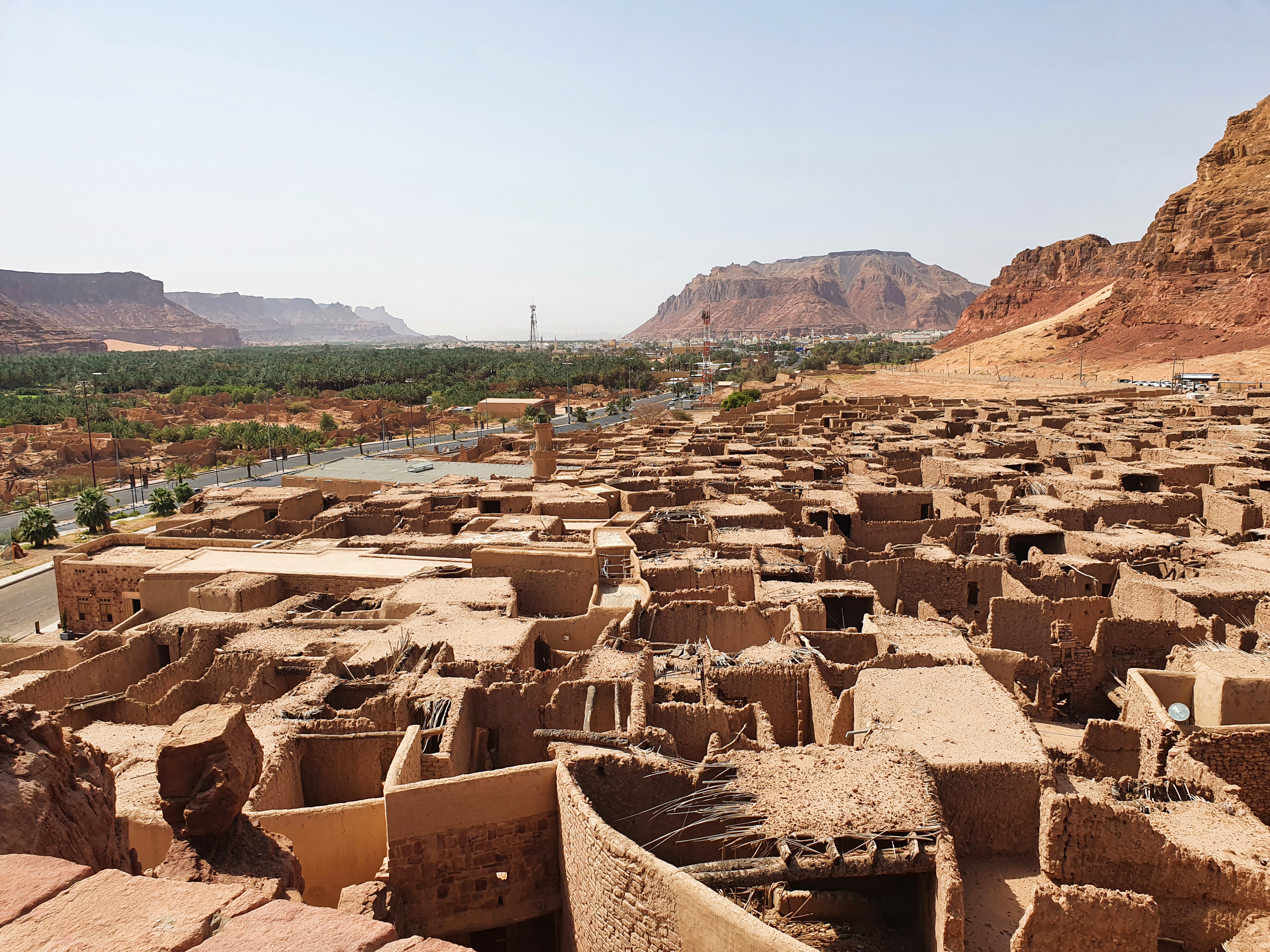
The Lihyanite-Arab old town of al-Ula in Saudi Arabia was part of the Incense trade route

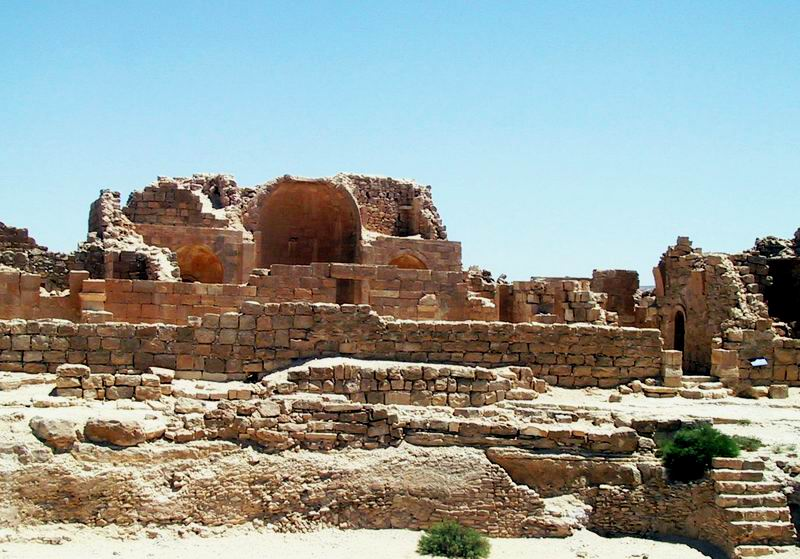
Desert Nabatean-Arab cities in the Naqab, such as Subeita, were linked to the Mediterranean end of the ancient incense and spice trading routes.

The Egyptians had traded in the Red Sea, importing spices, gold and exotic wood from the "Land of Punt" and from Arabia. Indian goods were brought in Arabian and Indian vessels to Aden. Rawlinson identifies the long-debated "ships of Tarshish," as a Tyrian fleet equipped at Ezion-Geber that made several trading voyages to the east bringing back gold, silver, ivory and precious stones. These goods were transshipped at the port of Ophir.

One historian said:

In the ancient period, it would seem that South Arabia and the Horn of Africa were the major suppliers of incense, while in modern times the commercial centre for the trade in gums has been Aden and Oman. Early ritual texts from Egypt show that incense was being brought to the upper Nile by land traders, but perhaps the most spectacular evidence of this trade is provided by the frescos dated to around 1500 BC on the walls of the temple at Thebes commemorating the journey of a fleet that the Queen of Egypt had sent to the Land of Punt. Five ships are depicted in these reliefs, piled high with treasure, and one of them shows thirty-one small incense trees in tubs being carried on board.

The Periplus Maris Erythraei and other Greek texts refer to several coastal sites in Somalia, Southern Arabia and India involved with trade in frankincense, myrrh, cassia, bdellium and a range of gum resins termed duaka and kankamon and mok rotu.

At the beginning of the 5th century BC, the demand for frankincense in the ancient world increased, so did the volume of traffic along the routes, and the trade of perfumes along it, especially frankincense and myrrh, gave it its name. In the Hellenistic and Roman world, frankincense was considered a valuable product whose value exceeded that of gold, and it was used for worship and for medical and cosmetic purposes.

== Land routes ==
Among the most important trading points of the incense trade route from the Persian Gulf to the Mediterranean Sea was Gerrha in the Persian Gulf, reported by the historian Starbo. Gerrha exercised influence over the incense trade routes across Arabia to the Mediterranean and controlled the aromatics trade to Babylon in the 1st century BC. Gerrha was one of the important entry ports for goods shipped from India.

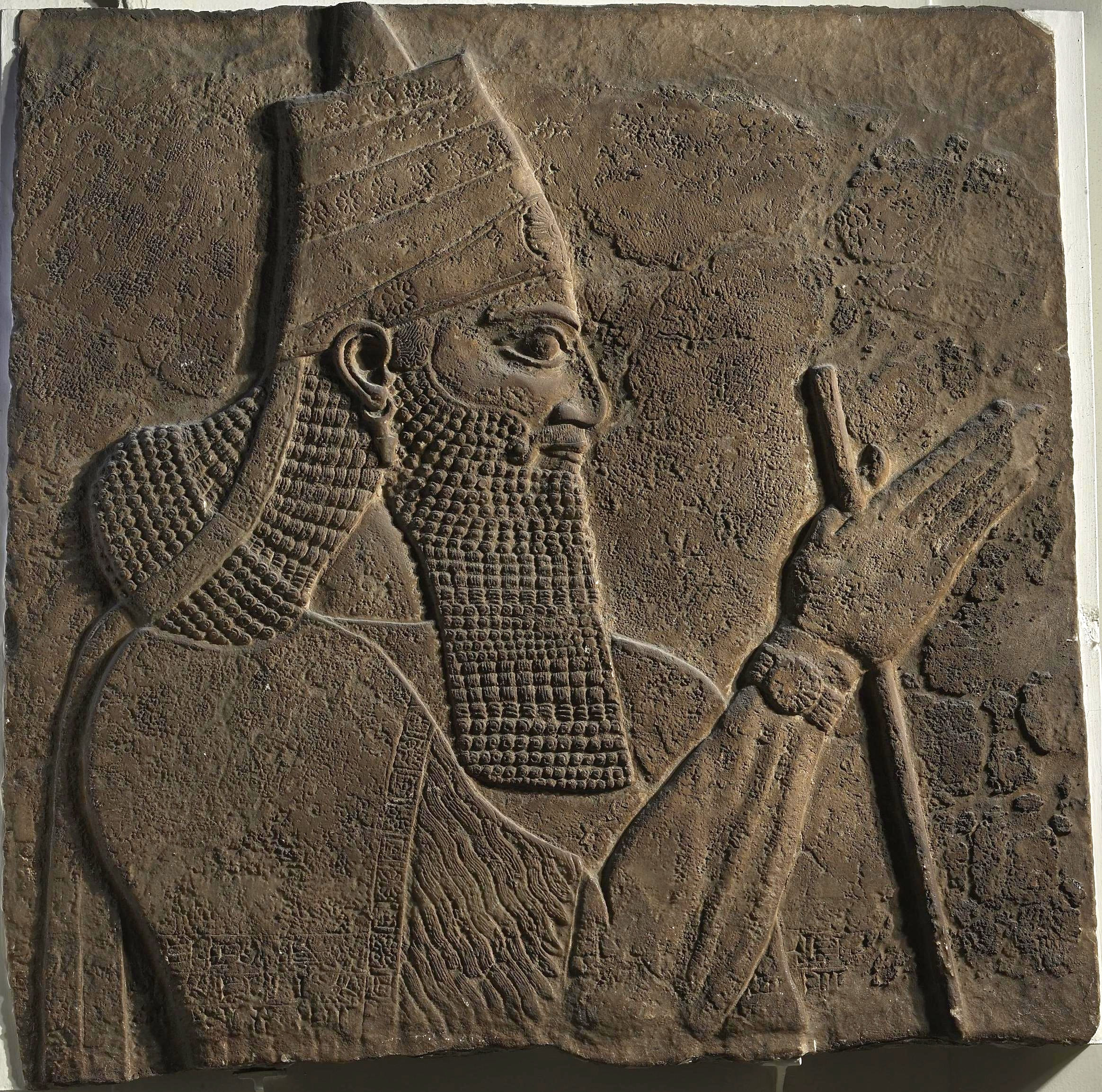
Tiglath-Pileser III attacked Gaza in order to control trade along the Incense Route.

Due to its prominent position in the incense trade, Yemen attracted settlers from the Fertile Crescent. The frankincense and myrrh trees were crucial to the economy of Yemen and were recognized as a source of wealth by its rulers. Recent exploration discovered an ancient trade route through eastern Yemen in the Mahra region.

Assyrian documents indicate that Tiglath-Pileser III advanced through Phoenicia to Gaza. Gaza was eventually sacked and the ruler of Gaza escaped to Egypt but later continued to act as a vassal administrator. The motive behind the attack was to gain control of the South Arabian incense trade which had prospered along the region.

I.E.S. Edwards connects the Syro-Ephraimite War to the desire of the Israelites and the Aramaeans to control the northern end of the Incense Route, which ran up from Southern Arabia and could be tapped by commanding Transjordan. Archaeological inscriptions also speak of booty retrieved from the land of the mu-u-na-a-a, possibly Meunites mentioned in the Old Testament. Some scholars identify this group as the Minaeans of South Arabia, who were involved with the incense trade and occupied the northern trading outposts of the Incense Route.

Aromatics from Dhofar and luxury goods from India brought wealth to the kingdoms of Arabia. The aromatics of Dhofar were shipped out from the natural harbour of Khor Rori towards the western inhospitable South Arabian coast. The caravans carried these products north to Shabwa and from there on to the kingdoms of Qataban, Saba', Ma'in, and Petra up to Gaza. There is also evidence to support that products from the Dhofar region were traded with the Sumerian-Magan people of Dilmun and Qatar as the Sumerian people used some of these resins for medicinal purposes. The tolls levied by the owners of wells and other facilities added to the overall cost of these luxury goods.

== Greco-Roman bypassing of land routes ==
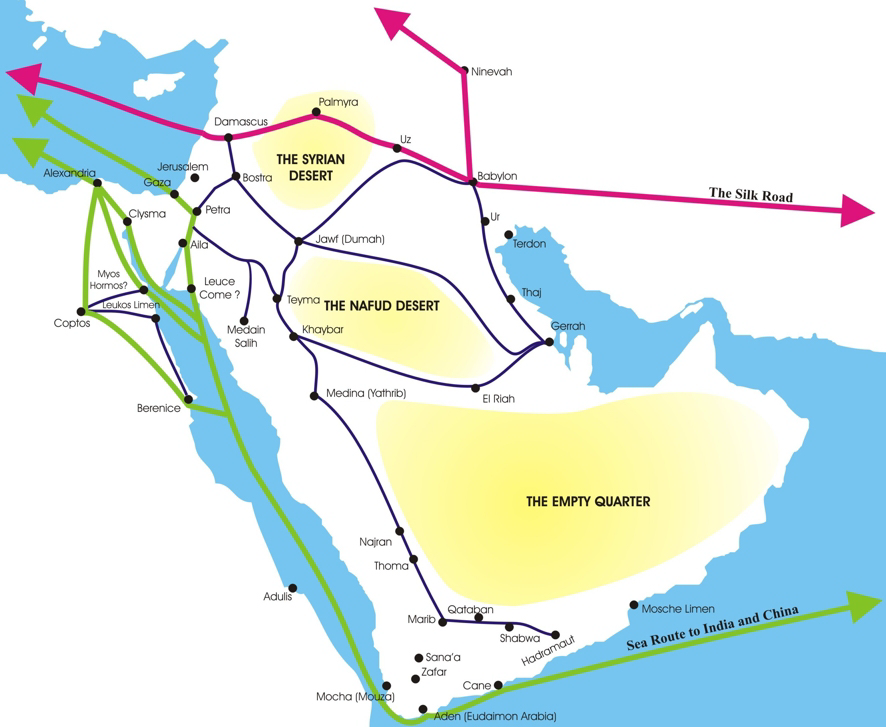
The Nabatean trade routes

The Nabateans built Petra, which stood halfway between the opening to the Gulf of Aqaba and the Dead Sea at a point where the Incense Route from Arabia to Damascus was crossed by the overland route from Petra to Gaza. This position gave the Nabateans a hold over the trade along the Incense Route. In order to control the Incense Route from the Nabateans a Greek military expedition was undertaken, without success, by Antigonus Cyclops, one of Alexander of Macedonia's generals. The Nabatean control over trade increased and spread to the West and the North.

The replacement of Greece by the Roman Empire as the administrator of the Mediterranean basin led to the resumption of direct trade with the east. According to a historian, "The South Arabs in protest took to pirate attacks over the Roman ships in the Gulf of Aden. In response, the Romans attacked Aden and favoured the Western Abyssinian coast of the Red Sea." The monopoly of the Indian and Arab middlemen weakened with the development of monsoon trade by the Greeks through the discovery of the direct route to India (Hippalus), forcing the Parthian and Arabian middlemen to adjust their prices so as to compete on the Roman market with the goods now being bought in by a direct sea route to India. Indian ships sailed to Egypt as the maritime routes of Southern Asia were not under the control of a single power.

According to one historian:

The trade with Arabia and India in incense and spices became increasingly important, and Greeks for the first time began to trade directly with India. The discovery, or rediscovery, of the sea-route to India is attributed to a certain Eudoxos, who was sent out for this purpose towards the end of the reign of Ptolemy Euergetes II (died 116 BC). Eudoxos made two voyages to India, and subsequently, having quarrelled with his Ptolemaic employers, perished in an unsuccessful attempt to open up an alternative sea route to India, free of Ptolemaic control, by sailing around Africa. The establishment of direct contacts between Egypt and India was probably made possible by a weakening of Arab power at this period, for the Sabaean kingdom of South-western Arabia collapsed and was replaced by Himyarite Kingdom around 115 BC. Imports into Egypt of cinnamon and other eastern spices, such as pepper, increased substantially, though the Indian Ocean trade remained for the moment on quite a small scale, no more than twenty Egyptian ships venturing outside the Red Sea each year.

Roman maritime trade routes with India according to the Periplus Maris Erythraei, 1st century AD. The Romans bypassed the land route in favour of the faster and safer searoute.

An earlier commentator on the significance of the trade, in terms of the connectivity of civilisations on both sides of the Red Sea from the time of the Queen of Sheba, was the British explorer Theodore Bent; it was Bent who identified the trading site of Moscha Limen in February 1895. Frankincense from Dhofar was collected at Moscha Limen. It was shipped to Qana and taken overland to Shabwa and further North to Najran, Mecca, Medina, Petra and to Gaza on the Mediterranean Sea. It was also shipped to Babylon and Palmyra via the Persian Gulf.

The Roman trade with India kept increasing, and according to Strabo (II.5.12.):

At any rate, when Gallus was prefect of Egypt, I accompanied him and ascended the Nile as far as Syene and the frontiers of Ethiopia, and I learned that as many as one hundred and twenty vessels were sailing from Myos Hormos to India, whereas formerly, under the Ptolemies, only a very few ventured to undertake the voyage and to carry on traffic in Indian merchandise.

== Decline ==
According to a historian:

The third century would thus appear to be a significant time in the history of the incense trade in Arabia. During the political and economic crisis of that century the nature of the trade changed dramatically; prior to that time the incense route from South Arabia seems to have continued to function. Much of this trade seems to have been brought to a standstill by the poor economic conditions of the third century, however, when the economic situation improved again under the Tetrarchy many things had changed. By this time, the two main routes in use seem to have been the Wadi Sirhan, now carrying trade which formerly would have passed through Palmyra, and Aila, receiving goods from India and Arabia which before had gone to the Egyptian Red Sea ports.

Sassanian Empire in 602 to 629

At the end of the sixth century Isidore of Seville enumerated the aromatics still being imported into Visigothic Spain. Of aromatic trees (de arboris aromaticis) Isidore listed in his encyclopedia myrrh, pepper, cinnamon, amomum (cardamom?) and cassia; of aromatic herbs (de herbis aromaticis), nard, saffron, cardamom, would have arrived through the trade routes, others were available in Spain: thyme, aloes, rose, violet, lily, gentian, wormwood, fennel and others.

Egypt under the rule of the Rashidun. Muhammad, 622–632 Patriarchal Caliphate, 632–661 Umayyad Caliphate, 661–750

Following the Persian–Roman Wars the areas under the Roman Byzantine Empire were captured by Khosrow I of the Persian Sassanian Dynasty. The Arabs, led by 'Amr ibn al-'As, crossed into Egypt in late 639 or early 640.

This advance marked the beginning of the Rashidun conquest of Egypt and the fall of ports such as Alexandria, used to secure trade with India by the Greco-Roman world since the Ptolemaic dynasty.

Several centuries after the demise of the incense trade, coffee was responsible for bringing back Yemen to international commerce via the Red Sea port of al-Mocha.

Finally, the Ottoman Turks conquered Constantinople in the 15th century, marking the beginning of Turkish control over the most direct trade routes between Europe and Asia.

== World Heritage status ==
=== Oman section ===
UNESCO's World Heritage Committee meeting on November 27, 2000, in Cairns, Australia attached World Heritage Site status to The Frankincense Trail in Oman. The official citation reads:

The frankincense trees of Wadi Dawkah and the remains of the caravan oasis of Shisr/Wubar and the affiliated ports of Khor Rori and Al-Balid vividly illustrate the trade in frankincense that flourished in this region for many centuries, as one of the most important trading activities of the ancient and medieval world.

=== Naqab section ===
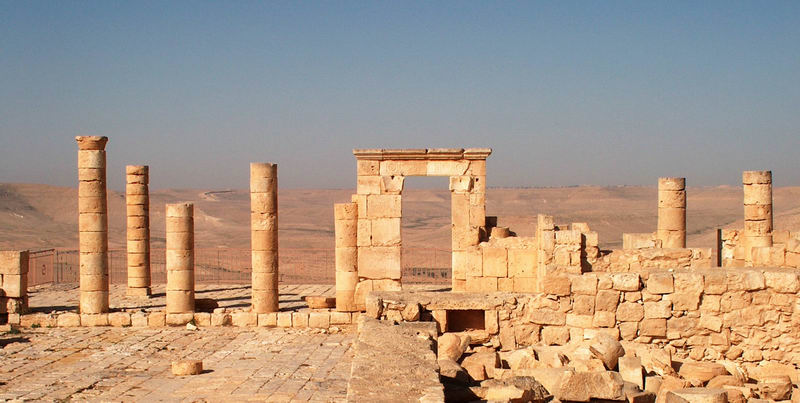
Ruins of Abdah

The World Heritage Committee, headed by Themba Wakashe, recorded Incense Route - Desert Cities in the Naqab on UNESCO's World Heritage List on July 15, 2005. The official citation reads:

The four Nabatean towns of Khalasa, Kurnub, Abdah and Subeita, along with associated fortresses and agricultural landscapes in the Negev Desert (Naqab Desert), are spread along routes linking them to the Mediterranean end of the Incense and Spice route. Together they reflect the hugely profitable trade in frankincense and myrrh from South Arabia to the Mediterranean, which flourished from the 3rd century B.C. until the 2nd century A.D. With the vestiges of their sophisticated irrigation systems, urban constructions, forts, and caravanserai they bear witness to the way in which the harsh desert was settled for trade and agriculture.

Nabatean stations in the Negev Desert in Israel

Nabataean or Roman Nabataean sites have been found at excavated at Moyat Awad (mistakenly called Moa of the 6th c. CE Madaba Map), Qatzra, Har Masa, Mezad Nekarot, Sha'ar Ramon (Khan Saharonim), Mezad Ma'ale Mahmal and Grafon.

Avdat continued to prosper as a major station along the Petra-Gaza road after the Roman annexation of Nabataea in 106 CE.

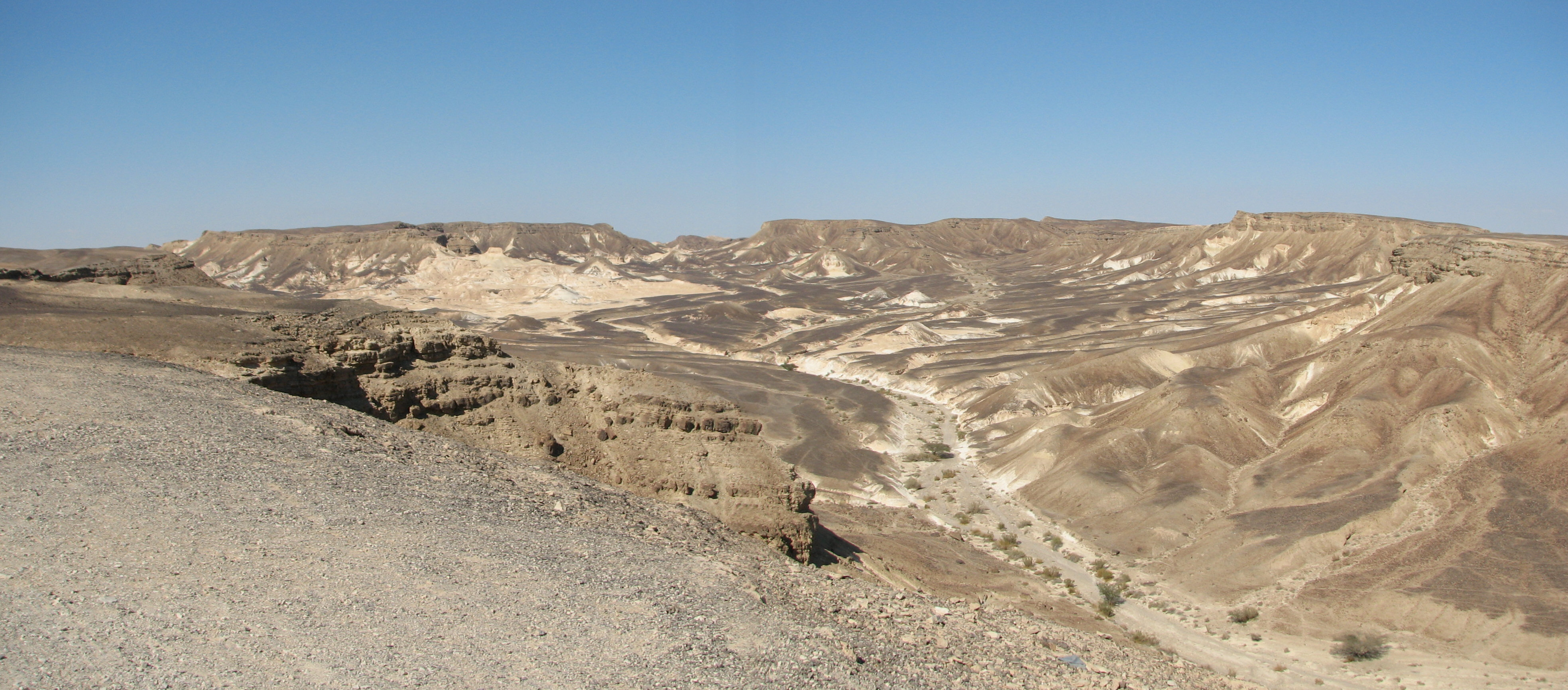
Nahal Qatzra, one of the main wadis on the Spice and Incense Routes in the Negev Desert, Israel.

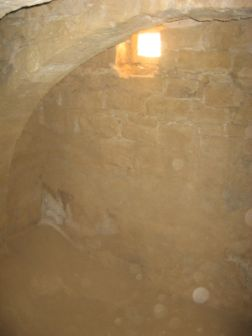
A secret underground Nabatean hideout on the Spice and Incense Routes in the Negev Desert, Israel.

== See also ==
Cities on the incense trade route

- Mada’in Salih, today in Saudi Arabia
- al-Ula, today in Saudi Arabia
- Khirbet Ruheibeh, today in Israel
- Metzad Mahmal in Israel
- Makhtesh Ramon

Other

- Indian Ocean trade
- Indo-Mediterranean
- King's Highway (ancient)
- Way of the Patriarchs
- Via Maris
- Pre-Muslim Arab trade
