= Avdat =

Archaeological site in Israel

Abdah
- עבדת (Hebrew)
- Ovdat; Eboda
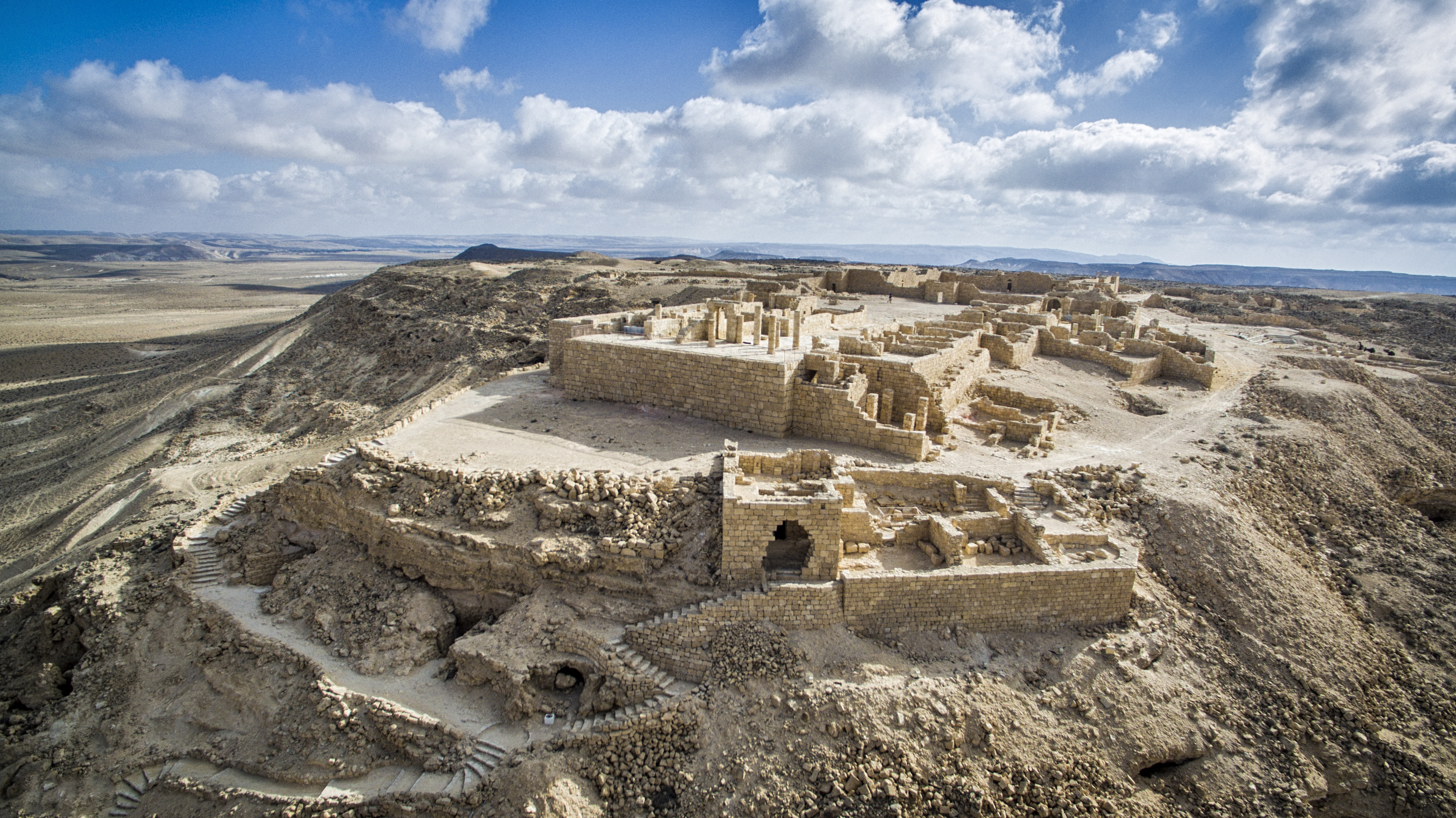
- Aerial view of the acropolis

- Location within Israel
- 30.794°N 34.773°E
- Type: Settlement
- Cultures: Nabataean, Roman, Byzantine, Early Islamic
- Location: Southern District, Israel
- Region: Negev

History
- Built: 3rd century BCE

Site notes
- Condition: In ruins

UNESCO World Heritage Site
- Official name: Incense Route - Desert Cities in the Negev (Haluza, Mamshit, Avdat and Shivta)
- Type: Cultural
- Criteria: iii, v
- Designated: 2005 (29th session)
- Reference no.: 1107
- Region: Europe and North America

Avdat or Ovdat (Hebrew: עבדת), and Abdah or Abde (Arabic: عبدة), are the modern names of an archaeological site corresponding to the ancient Nabataean, Roman and Byzantine settlement of Oboda (tabula Peutingeriana; Stephanus Byzantinus) or Eboda (Ptolemaeus 5:16, 4) in the Negev desert in southern Israel. It was inhabited with intermissions between the 3rd century BCE and the mid-7th century CE by Nabataeans, in their time becoming the most important city on the Incense Route after Petra, then by Roman army veterans, and Byzantines, and habitation continued well into the Early Muslim period. Avdat was a seasonal camping ground for Nabataean caravans travelling along the early Petra–Gaza road (Darb es-Sultan) in the 3rd – late 2nd century BCE. The city's original name was changed in honor of Nabataean King Obodas I, who, according to tradition, was revered as a deity and was buried there.

== History ==
Before the end of the 1st century BCE a temple platform (the acropolis) was created along the western edge of the plateau. Recent excavations have shown that the town continued to be inhabited by the Nabataeans continuously from this period until its destruction by earthquake in the early 8th century CE. Sometime towards the end of the 1st century BCE the Nabataeans began using a new route between the site of Moyat Awad in the Arabah valley and Avdat by way of Makhtesh Ramon. Nabataean or Roman Nabataean sites have been found and excavated at Moyat Awad (mistakenly identified as Moa of the 6th century CE Madeba Map), Qatzra, Har Masa, Mezad Nekarot, Sha'ar Ramon (Khan Saharonim), Mezad Ma'ale Mahmal and Grafon.

Avdat continued to prosper as a major station along the Petra-Gaza road after the Roman annexation of Nabataea in 106 CE. Avdat, like other towns in the central Negev highlands, adjusted to the cessation of international trade through the region in the early to mid 3rd century by adopting agriculture, and particularly the production of wine, as its means of subsistence. Numerous terraced farms and water channels were built throughout the region in order to collect enough run-off from winter rains to support agriculture in the hyper-arid zone of southern Palestine. At least five wine presses dated to the Byzantine period have been found at the site.

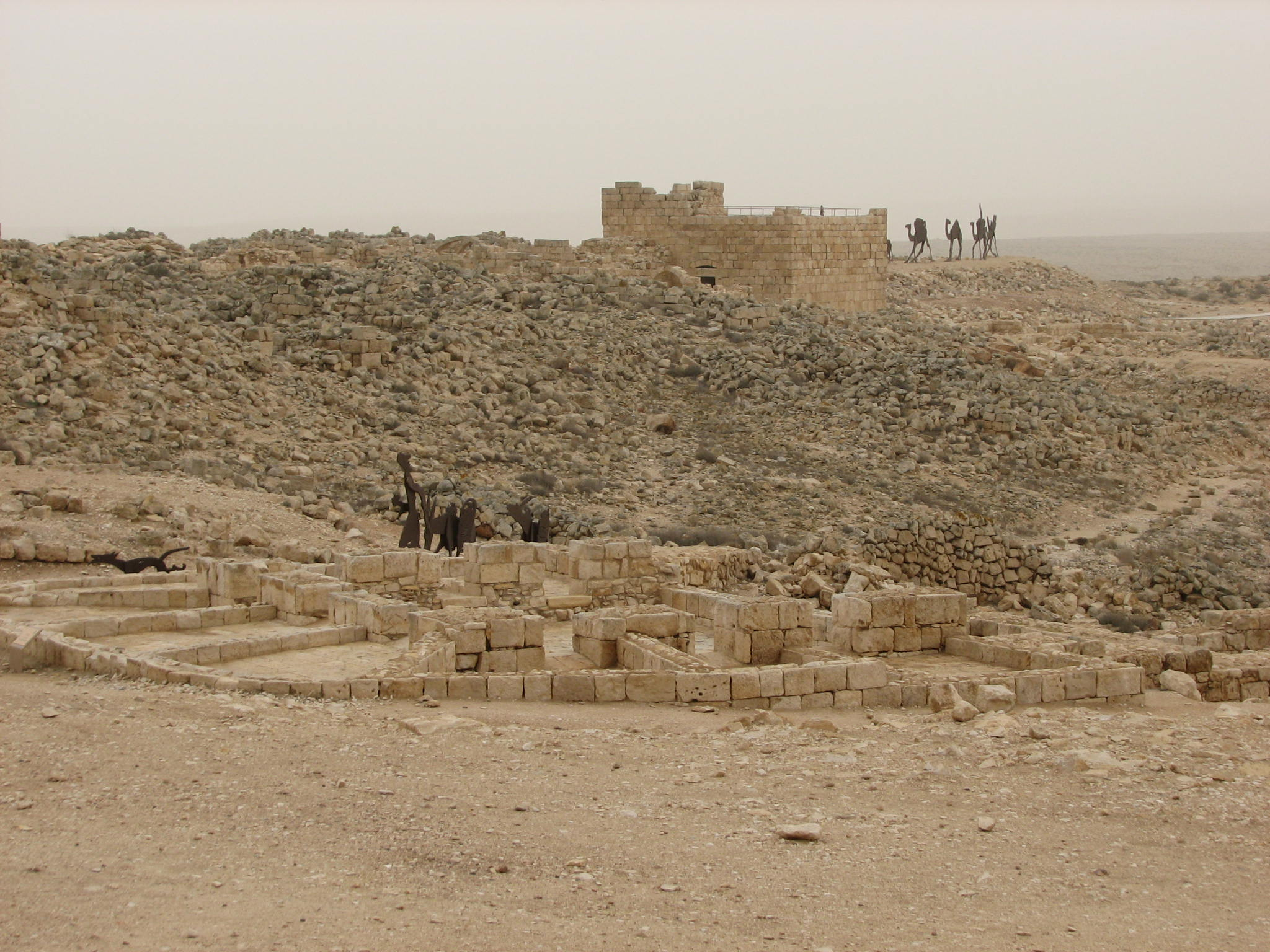
One of the huge wine presses in the Holy land during the Byzantine era in Avdat.

In the late 3rd or early 4th century (probably during the reign of Diocletian) the Roman army constructed an army camp measuring 100 x 100 m. on the northern side of the plateau. Elsewhere at the site, an inscription was found in the ruins of a tower describing the date (293/294 CE) and the fact that one of the builders hailed from Petra. Around this time a bath house was constructed on the plain below the site. The bath house was supplied with water by way of a well, tunneled 70 meters through bedrock. Sites along the Petra-Gaza road were apparently used by the Roman army in the 4th and 5th centuries when the road continued to function as an artery between Petra and the Nabataean Negev settlements. Pottery and coins from the late 3rd to the early 5th century have been found at Mezad Ma'ale Mahmal, Shar Ramon and Har Masa and Roman milestones line part of the road between Avdat and Shar Ramon. A fort with four corner towers was constructed on the ruins of early Nabataean structures north of Avdat at Horvat Ma'agora. Milestones have been found on along the Petra Gaza road north at Avdat between Avdat and Horvat Ma'agora and further up the road towards Halutza (Elusa).

The early town was heavily damaged by a major (probably local) earthquake, sometime in the early 5th century CE. In the ruins of this destruction a Nabataean inscription, in black ink on plaster, was found bearing a blessing of the Nabataean god, Dushara. The inscription was written by the plasterer, one Ben-Gadya. This is the latest Nabataean inscription ever found in Palestine.

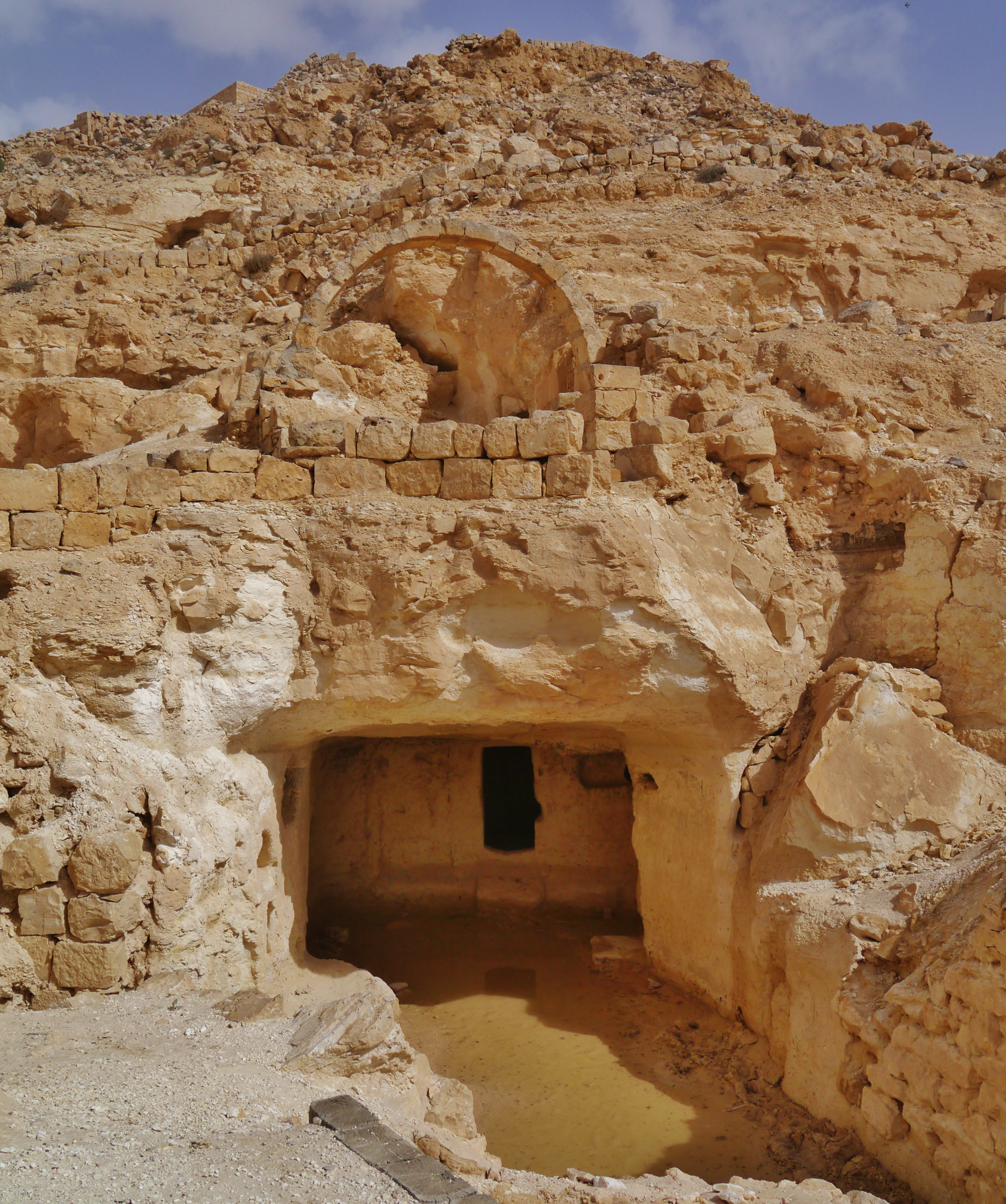
Entrance to a stone-built, cave dwelling

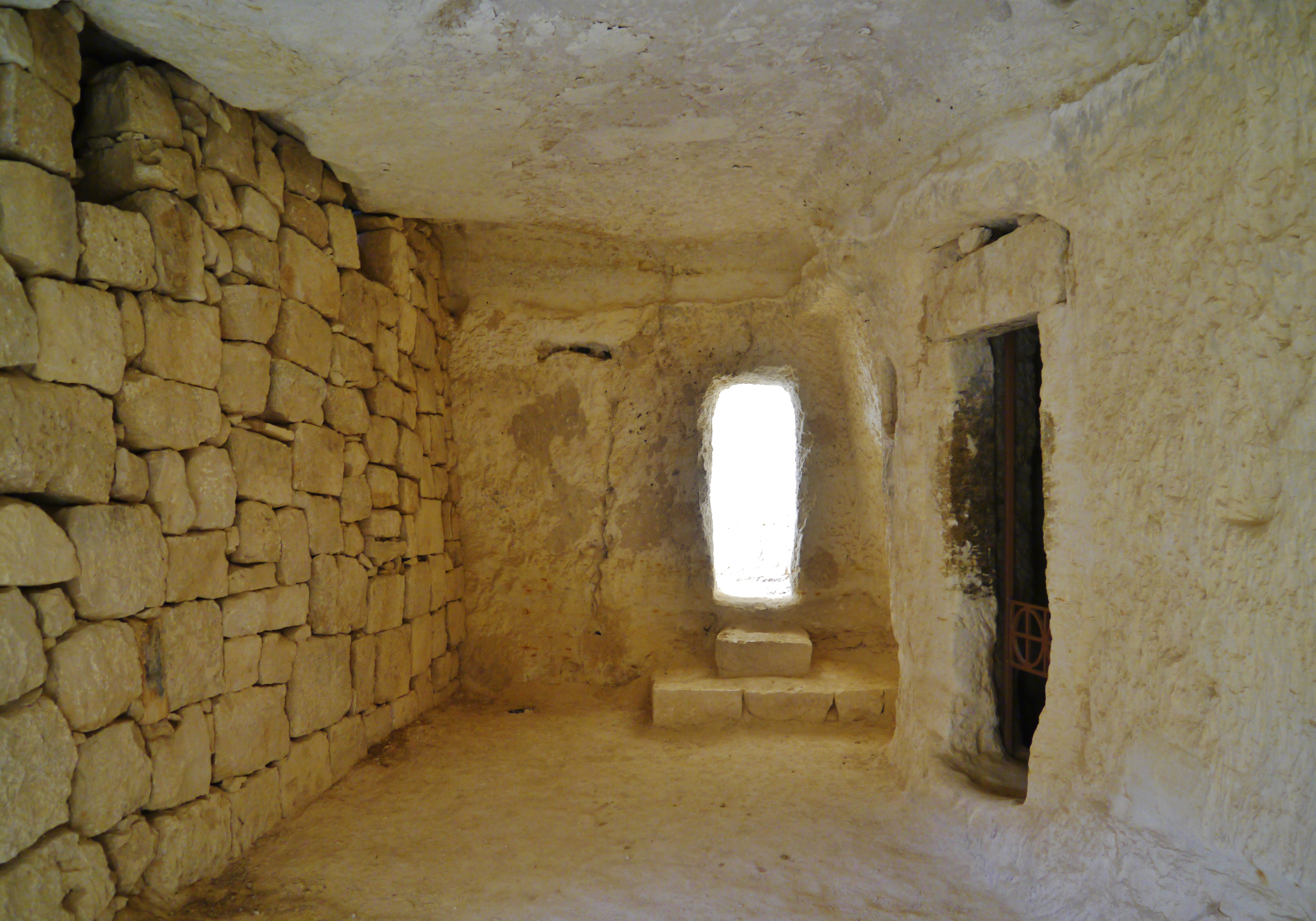
Interior of a stone-built, cave dwelling

A wall was built around the later town, including a large area of man-made caves, some of which were partially inhabited in the Byzantine period. Under Byzantine rule, in 5th and 6th century, a citadel and a monastery with two churches were built on the acropolis of Avdat. Saint Theodore's Church is the most interesting Byzantine relic in Avdat. Marble tombstones inserted in the floor are covered with Greek inscriptions. St. Theodore was a Greek martyr of the 4th century. The Monastery stands next to the church and nearby a lintel is carved with lions and it marks the entrance to the castle.

During an investigation of a two-hectare residential sector, comprising stone-built, multi-room cave dwellings on the southern slope of the ancient city, evidence of intensive activity in the Early Islamic period, ca. CE 650–900, was uncovered. The site was chosen for the excavation due to the concentration of sketched paintings in red, including crosses and a possible portrayal of St. Theodore. Analysis of organic waste samples brought back dates expected from the Byzantine period, but also several from the Umayyad Caliphate and Abbasid Caliphate eras, that were corroborated by findings of pottery fragments from ware produced at Khirbet al-Mafjar.

== Historical sites ==
=== Temple Precinct ===
==== Temple of Oboda ====
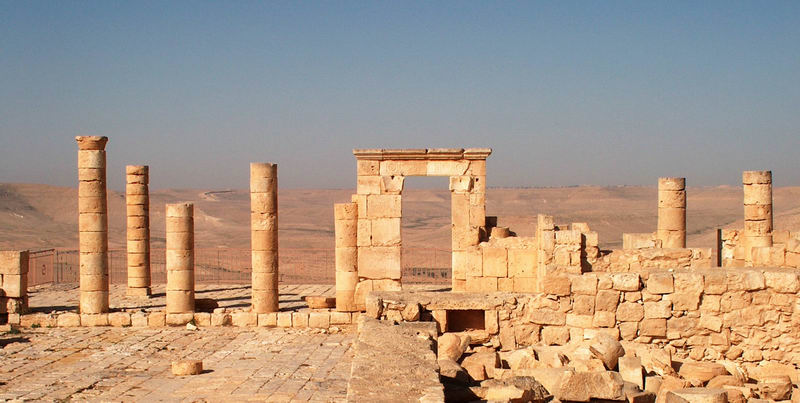
Temple of Oboda

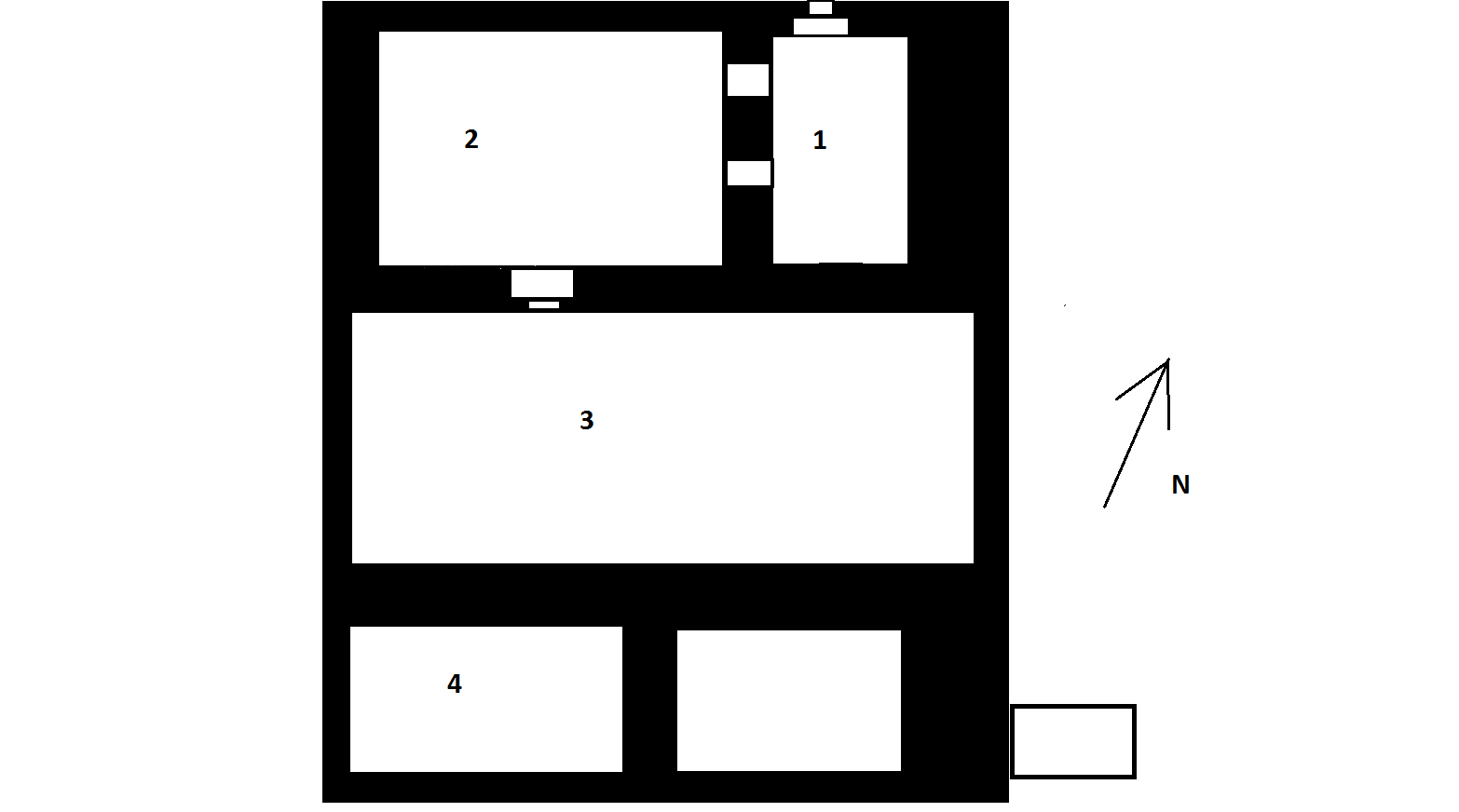
Temple Layout

The building complex known as The Temple of Oboda sits on the acropolis of the city. The temple was built as a dedication to the deified Nabataean king Obodas I. The temple stands adjacent to the east of two other buildings: a Christian chapel and a second temple known as the “western temple.” The temple dedicated to the cult of Obodas the King was built with a hard-limestone in the year 9 BCE during the reign of Obodas II. The temple is a tripartite structure: consisting of a porch, hall and adytum; its overall dimensions are 14 by 11 metres (46 ft × 36 ft). The building was divided into four rooms. The first and second rooms were unequal subdivisions of the adytum (debir), the first room is the eastern room which is the smaller of the two measuring at 3 by 4 metres (9.8 ft × 13.1 ft). The second room was the western room and the larger of the two rooms measuring 5 by 4 metres (16 ft × 13 ft). The third room was the hall (hekhal), an oblong shape measuring 8 metres (26 ft), which is now completely covered by a Talus. The fourth room is the porch (‘ulam) divided into two compartments one facing west measuring approximately 4 by 4 metres (13 ft × 13 ft) and the other facing east measuring approximately 4 by 4.5 metres (13 ft × 15 ft) were divided by a 60-centimetre (2 ft) wall. A worshiper entered through the porch, which faces south, proceeded through the hall to the rooms of the adytum at the northern end. The worshiper then turned about face toward south to worship the images of the deities placed in niches in the wall. The western room contained two niches which may have contained the images of two Nabataean gods Allat and Dushura. The other room contained a larger single niche where it is believed the deified image of Obodas the King was worshiped. The temple was built to be his eternal resting place and the center of worship for his cult.

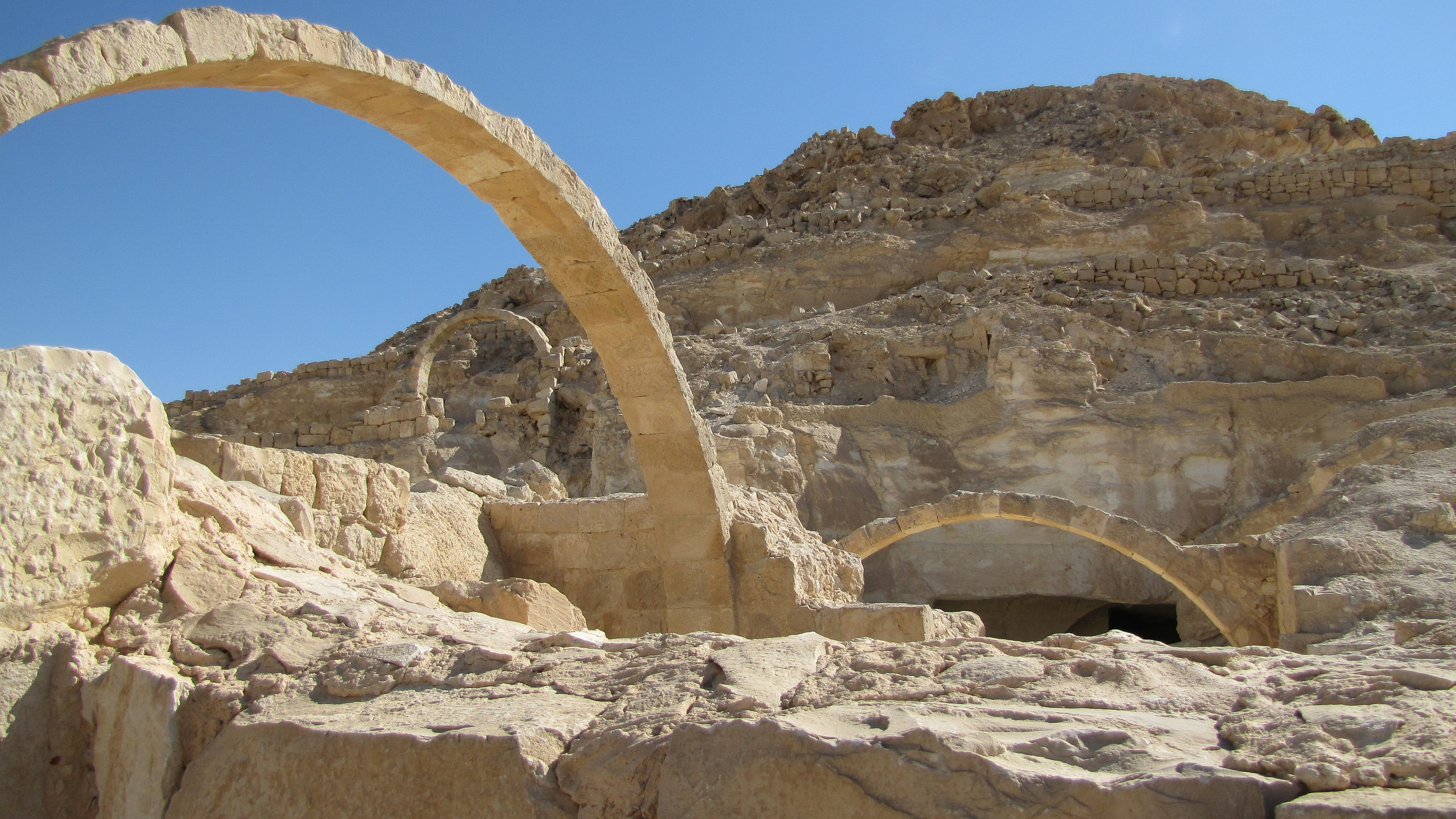
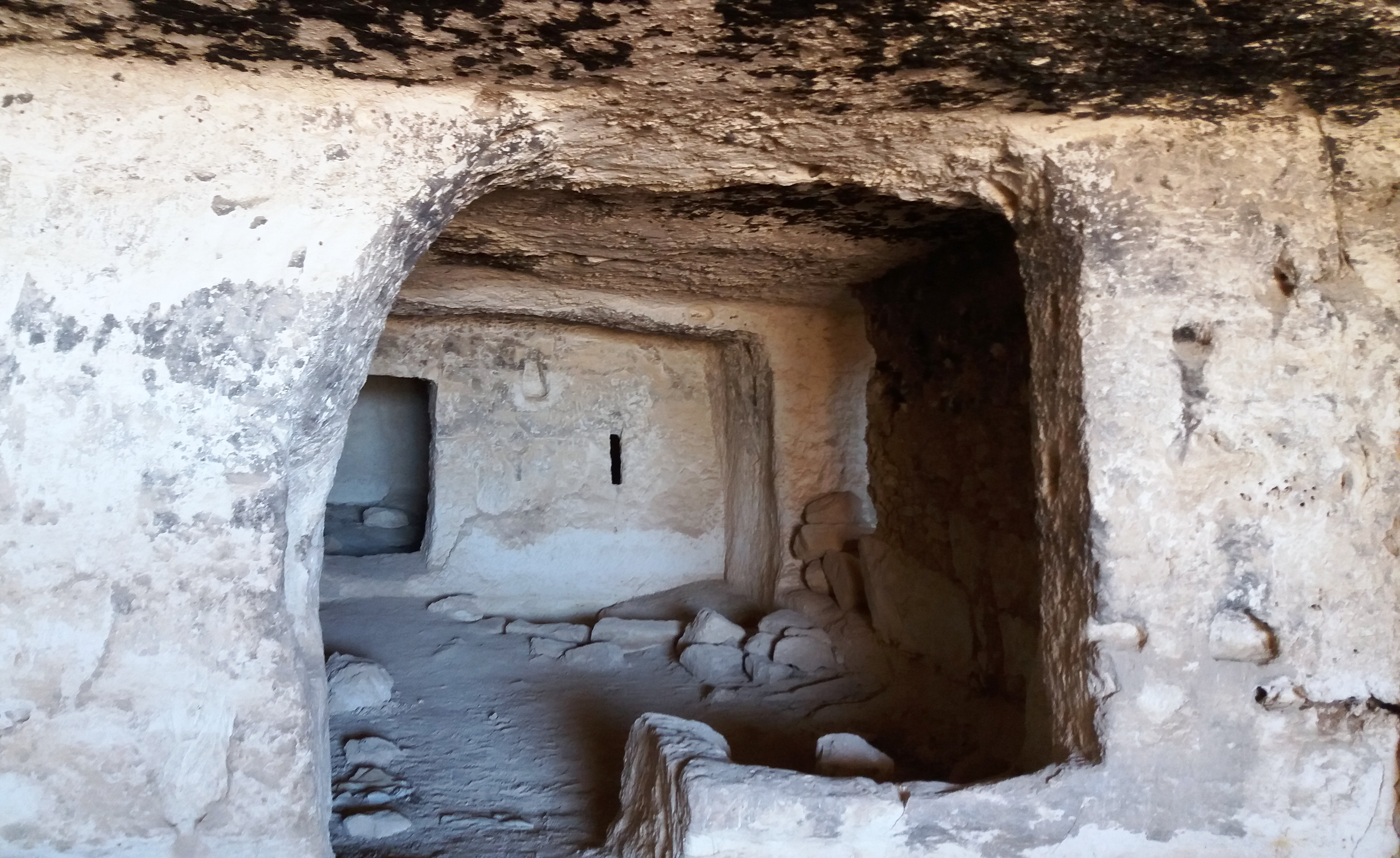
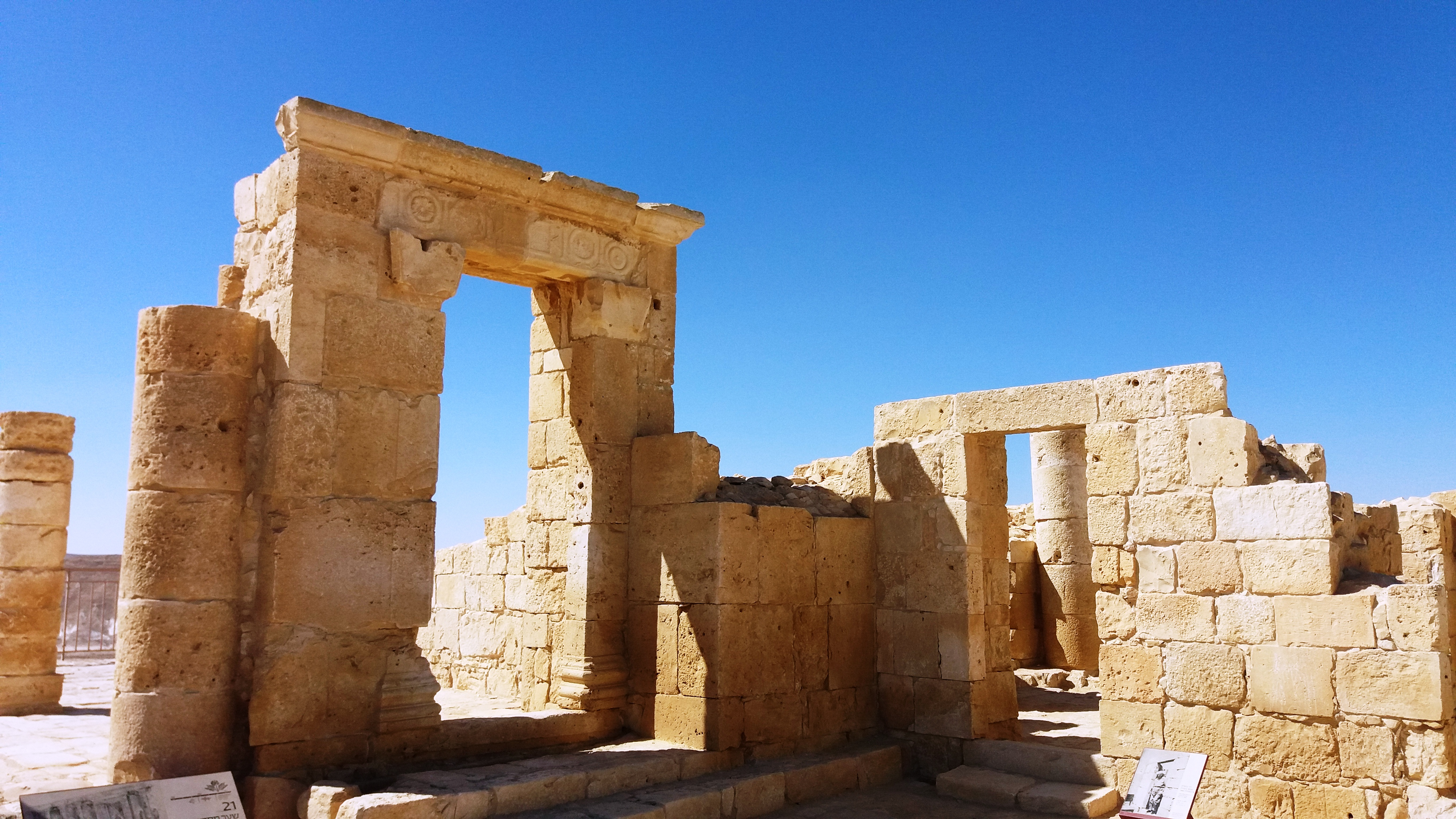
Archeological remains at Avdat.

==== Southern Basilica ====
Located on the southern flank of the upper city or the acropolis, it was dedicated to Saint Theodoros.

==== Northern Basilica ====
Larger of the two relatively preserved Byzantine churches, the northern Basilica, is located along the outer northern flank of the Temple Precinct.

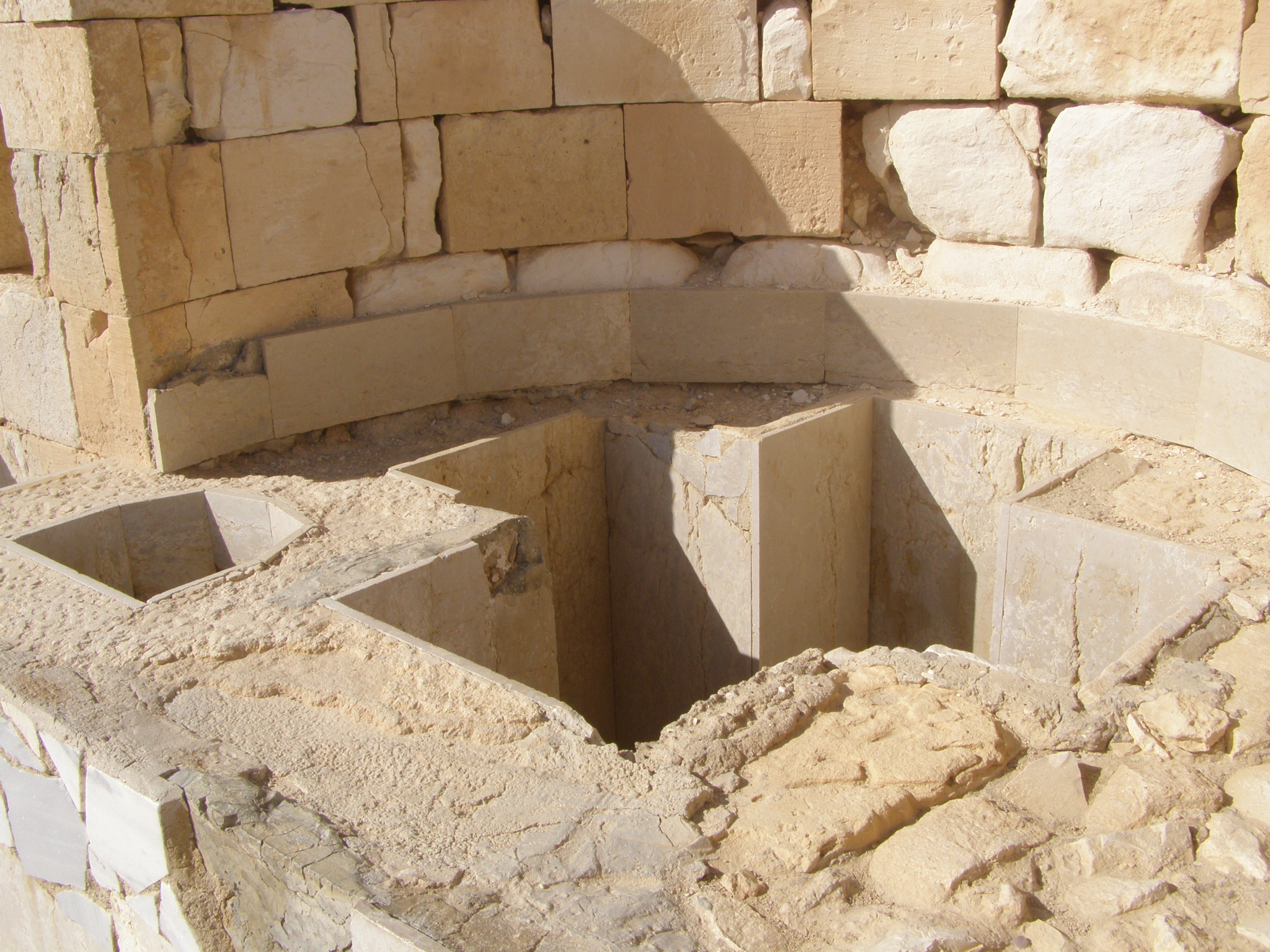
Baptismal basins in the northern Basilica

=== Fortress ===
The Byzantine era fortress lies to the north-west of the Temple Precinct, roughly covering an area of 2500 square meters.

=== Byzantine Quarter ===
It lies to the south-east of the Avdat Acropolis.

== Today ==
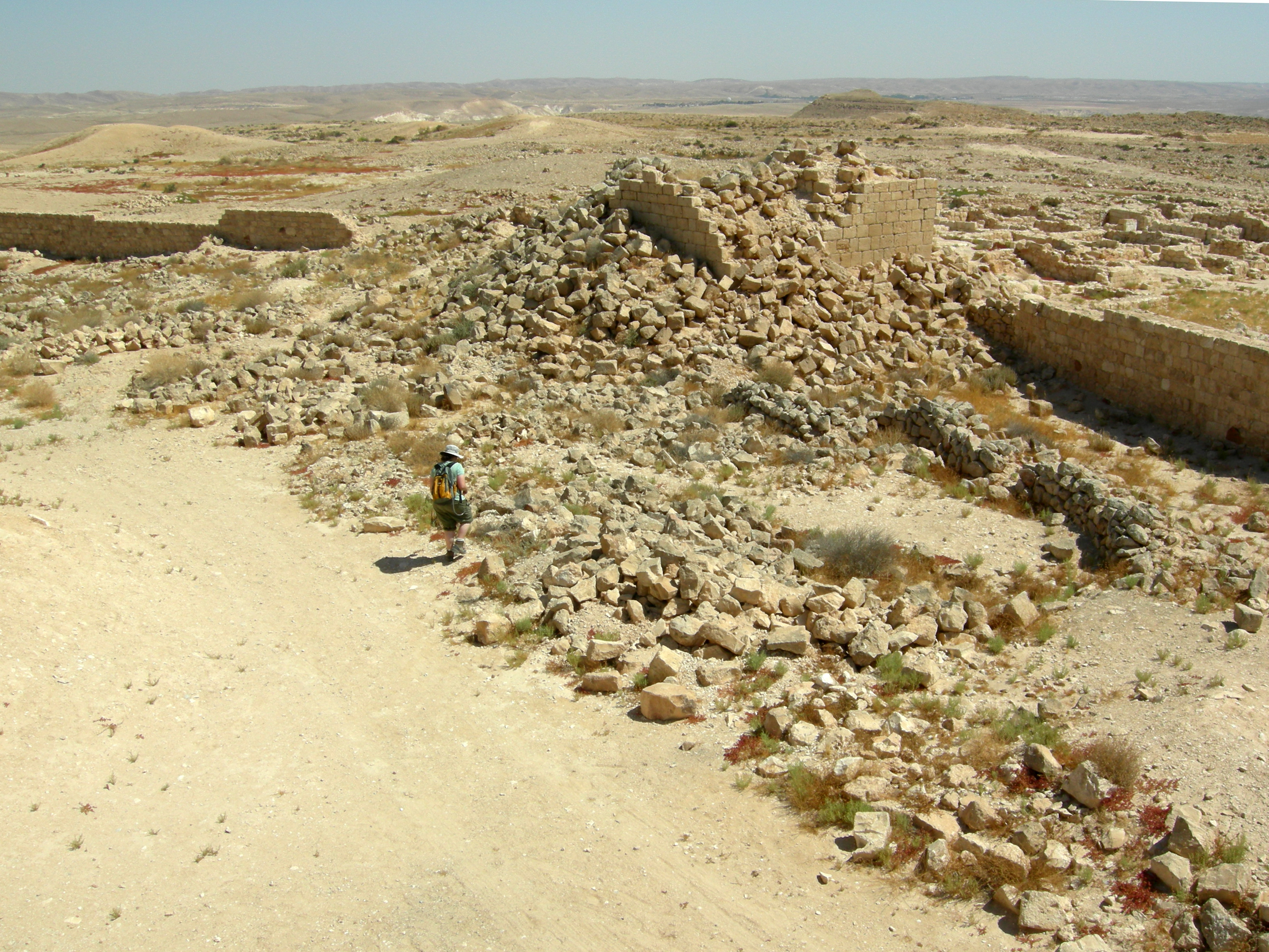
Avdat earthquake damage

Avdat was declared a World Heritage Site by UNESCO in June 2005, but on 4 October 2009 the site suffered extensive damage when hundreds of artifacts were smashed and paint smeared on walls and an ancient wine press. Two Bedouin men were later indicted for causing NIS 8.7 million worth ($2.3 million) of damage to the site. The men sought to avenge the demolition of a nearby relatives' home by Israeli authorities.

Avdat was also the filming location of Jesus Christ Superstar.

An article by the Pennsylvania State University presents a study and findings from more than 500 sites over a total area of 150 km2, discussing the Byzantine-period remnants (fourth–early seventh century CE) and the interaction between the settlement and its surrounding agricultural systems.

Reconstruction of Nabatean Farms.

In the late 1950s the Desert Runoff Farms Unit, now a joint project of The Hebrew University of Jerusalem and Ben-Gurion University of the Negev, reconstructed two Nabatean farms, one at Shivta and the other at Avdat.

== Bibliography ==
- Ben David, H. (2005) "The Paved Roman Road from Petra to the Arava", Cathedra 116: 31–48. (in Hebrew)
- Cohen, R. (1980) "The Excavations in ‘Avdat 1977", Qadmoniot 49–50:44–46 (in Hebrew)
- Cohen, R. (1982) "New Light on the Date of the Petra-Gaza Road", Biblical Archaeologist 45:240–247.
- Cohen, R. and A. Negev (1976) "Avdat", Hadashot Arkheologiyot (Archaeological Newsletter) 59–60:55–57 (in Hebrew)
- Erickson-Gini, T. (2002) "Nabataean or Roman? Reconsidering the Date of the Camp at Avdat in Light of Recent Excavations", in Freeman, P.W.M., Bennett, J., Fiema, Z.T., and Hoffmann, B. (eds., 2002) Limes XVIII – Proceedings of the XVIIIth International Congress of Roman Frontier Studies held in Amman, Jordan (September 2000) BAR Int. Ser. Vol. I. Oxford. : 113–130.
- Fabian, P. (1996) "Evidence of Earthquake Destruction in the Archaeological Record – The Case of Ancient Avdat", in Big Cities World Conference on Natural Disaster Mitigation in Conjunction with the Tenth International Seminar on Earthquake Prognostics, Abstracts, Jan. 5–10, 1996, Cairo, Egypt: 25.
- Fabian, Peter (2011-06-26). "'Avedat" (123). Hadashot Arkheologiyot – Excavations and Surveys in Israel.
- Korjenkov, A.M., Fabian, P., and Becker, P. (1996) "Evidence for 4th and 7th Century AD Earthquakes, Avdat Ruins (Israel): Seismic and Historical Implications", Annual Meeting of the Israel Geological Society, Eilat, March 18–21, 1996:.52.
- Korjenkov, A.M. and Mazor, E. (1999a) ‘Seismogenic Origin of Ancient Avdat Ruins, Negev Desert, Israel’, Natural Hazards 18: 193–226.
- Negev, A. (1961) "Nabatean Inscriptions from ‘Avdat (Oboda)", Israel Exploration Journal 11: 127–138.
- Negev, A. (1963) "Nabatean Inscriptions from ‘Avdat", Israel Exploration Journal 13: 113–124.
- Negev, A. (1963) "Chapters in the History of ‘Avdat", Elath: 118–148. (Hebrew).
- Negev, A. (1966) Cities of the Desert. Tel Aviv.
- Negev, A. (1967) "Oboda, Mampsis and Provincia Arabia", Israel Exploration Journal 17: 46–55.
- Negev, A. (1969) "The Chronology of the Middle Nabatean Period", Palestine Exploration Quarterly 101:5–14.
- Negev, A. (1974) The Nabataean Potter’s Workshop at Oboda. Bonn.
- Negev, A. (1974) "The Churches of the Central Negev: An Archaeological Survey", Revue Biblique 81:400–422.
- Negev, A. (1977) "The Excavations at ‘Avdat 1975-1976", Qadmoniot 37: 27–29. (Hebrew).
- Negev, A. (1978) "The Greek Inscriptions from Avdat (Oboda)", Liber Annuus 28: 87–126.
- Negev, A. (1981) The Greek Inscriptions from the Negev. Studium Biblicum Franciscanum. Collection Minor N. 25, Jerusalem.
- Negev, A. (1986) Late Hellenistic and Early Roman Pottery of Nabatean Oboda. Qedem 22. Jerusalem.
- Negev, A. (1991) "The Temple of Obodas: Excavations at Oboda in July 1981" "Israel Exploration Journal, Vol. 41, No. 1/3, pp. 62–80 Published by: Israel Exploration Society Article Stable URL: https://www.jstor.org/stable/27926214
- Negev, A. (1996) "Oboda: A Major Nabatean Caravan Halt", ARAM 8:1 & 2: 67–87.
- Negev, A. (1997) The Architecture of Oboda, Final Report. Qedem 36. Jerusalem.
