= Incense Route – Desert Cities in the Negev =

UNESCO World Heritage Site in Negev, Israel

UNESCO World Heritage Site
- Interactive map of Incense Route – Desert Cities in the Negev
- Location: Negev, Israel
- Includes: 1. The route, including Avdat; 2. Haluza; 3. Mamshit; 4. Shivta
- Criteria: Cultural: (iii), (v)
- Reference: 1107rev
- Inscription: 2005 (29th Session)
- Area: 6,655 ha (16,440 acres)
- Buffer zone: 63,868 ha (157,820 acres)
- Coordinates: 30°32′28″N 35°9′39″E
- The desert cities in south-central Israel Incense Route – Desert Cities in the Negev (West and Central Asia)

Incense Route – Desert Cities in the Negev

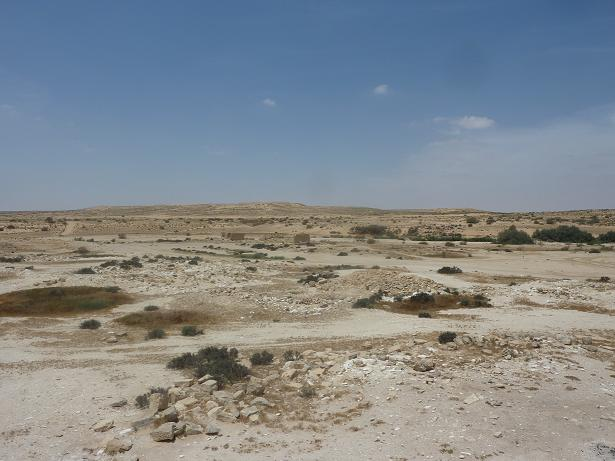
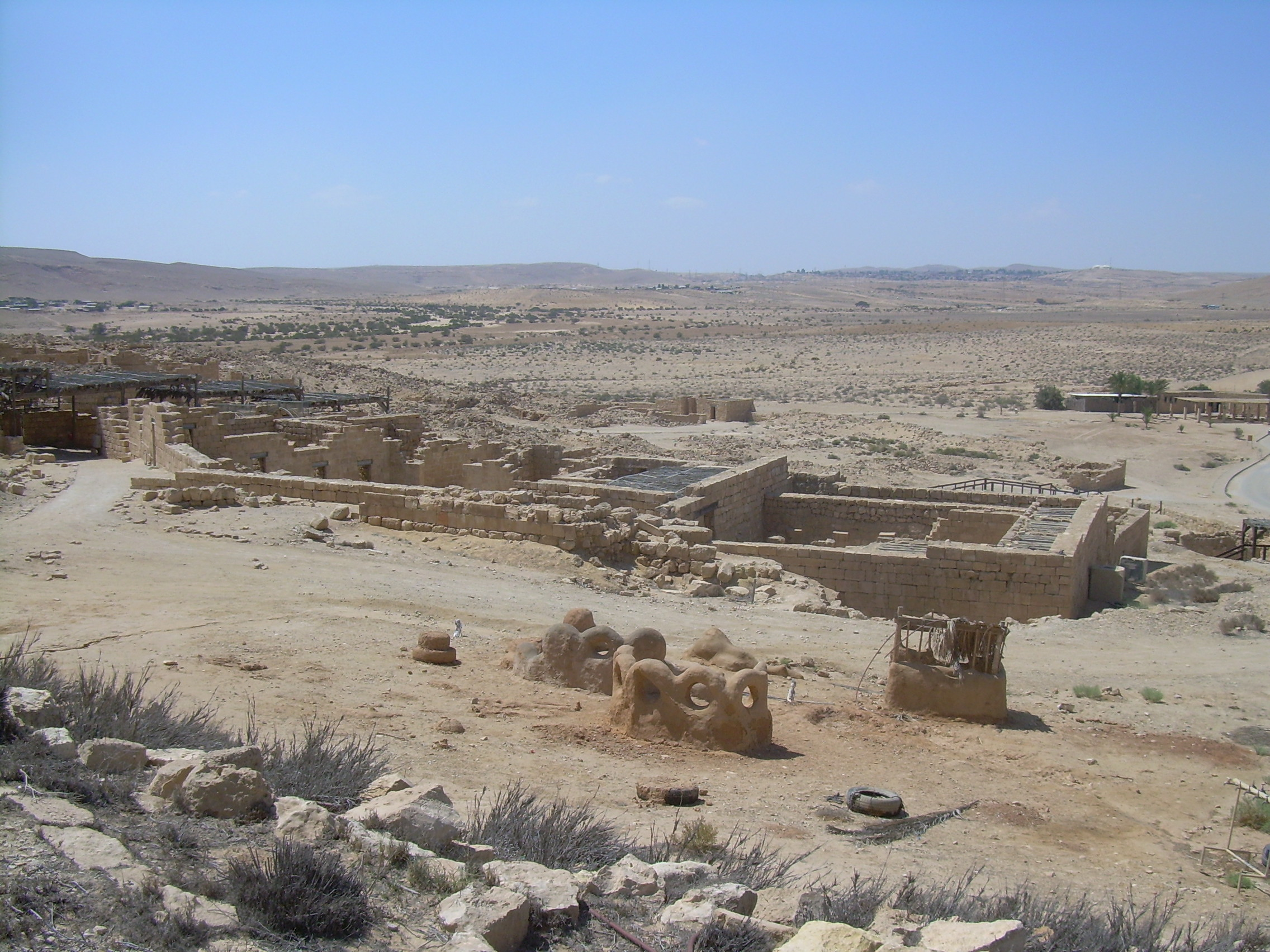
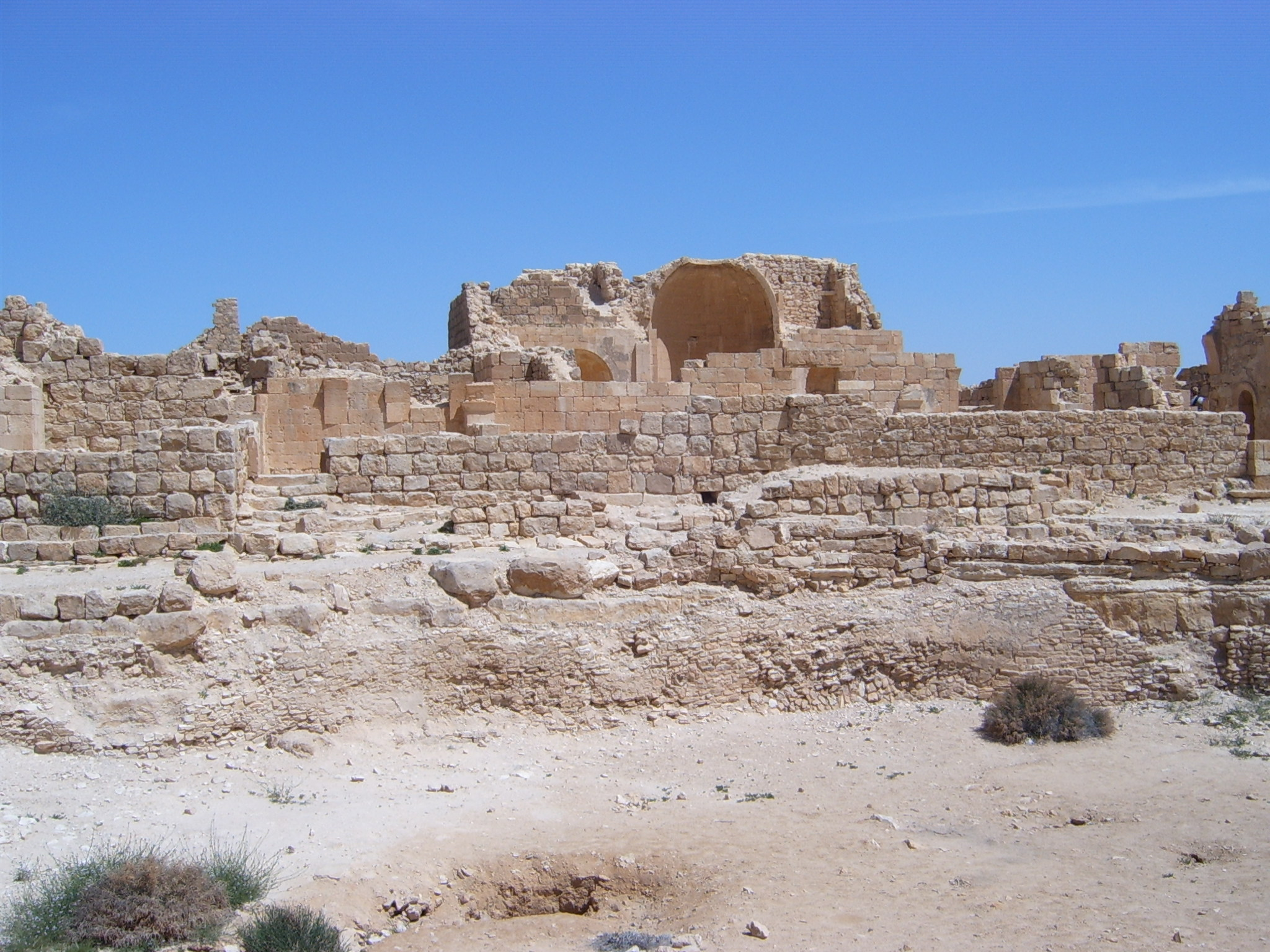

Avdat • Haluza
Mamshit • Shivta

Incense Route – Desert Cities in the Negev is a World Heritage-designated area near the end of the Incense Route in the Negev, southern Israel, which connected Arabia to the Mediterranean in the Hellenistic-Roman period, proclaimed as being of outstanding universal value by UNESCO in 2005. The trade led to the development of ancient towns, forts and caravanserai en route, apart from agricultural development.

Four towns in the Negev Desert, which flourished during the period from 300 BC to 200 AD, are linked directly with the Mediterranean terminus of both the Incense Road and spice trade routes: Avdat, Haluza, Mamshit, and Shivta. As a group, these desert cities demonstrate the lucrative trade in frankincense and myrrh that took place from Yemen in south Arabia to the port of Gaza on the Mediterranean. At its height, the route included cities, Qanat irrigation systems, fortresses, and caravanserai. Vestiges of these works are still visible, and demonstrate the use of the desert for commerce and agriculture.

== Location ==
The Incense Route – Desert Cities in the Negev site comprises the Negev, southern Israel, which connected Arabia to the Mediterranean in the Hellenistic–Roman periods. During the period from 300 BC to 200 AD, four towns which prospered in the Negev Desert were Avdat, Haluza, Mamshit, and Shivta. These were linked directly with the Mediterranean terminus of both the Incense Road and spice trade routes, which was the port of Gaza. During the peak period of prosperity the route included cities, Qanat irrigation systems, fortresses, and caravanserai.

== History ==
The east–west "incense route" which operated from 400 BC to 200 AD between Petra and Gaza is known as the King's Way and brought economic progress to the Nabataeans. The trade diminished when Romans occupied Petra which was then Jordan's capital of the Nabataean Empire. The Nabataeans had occupied this territory in the 6th century BC following the Edomites deserting this area and occupying the Judaean plains. This resulted in transformation of Nabataeans from their semi-nomadic living style to the Hellenistic culture where organized government machinery functioned. They perpetuated slave trade to the benefit of the Ptolemics even though they established neutral diplomatic and military relations with other countries.

The sites are managed by the Israel Nature and Parks Authority and the Israel Antiquities Authority; the latter authority has the task of conservation and excavation of the listed structures. The sites were mostly deserted from the 7th century AD and remained fairly well preserved.

=== World heritage status ===
Part of the incense route in the Negev Region of Israel, which included towns, forts, caravanserai and the irrigation system in desertic areas with links to the Mediterranean, has been inscribed as a cultural heritage site of the UNESCO's World Heritage List under Criteria (iii) as confirmation of the economic, social and cultural importance of frankincense to the Hellenistic-Roman world, and Criteria (v) for development along the route in severe desert conditions. The site was inscribed on 15 July 2005 in the meeting of the World Heritage Committee of UNESCO.

== Features ==
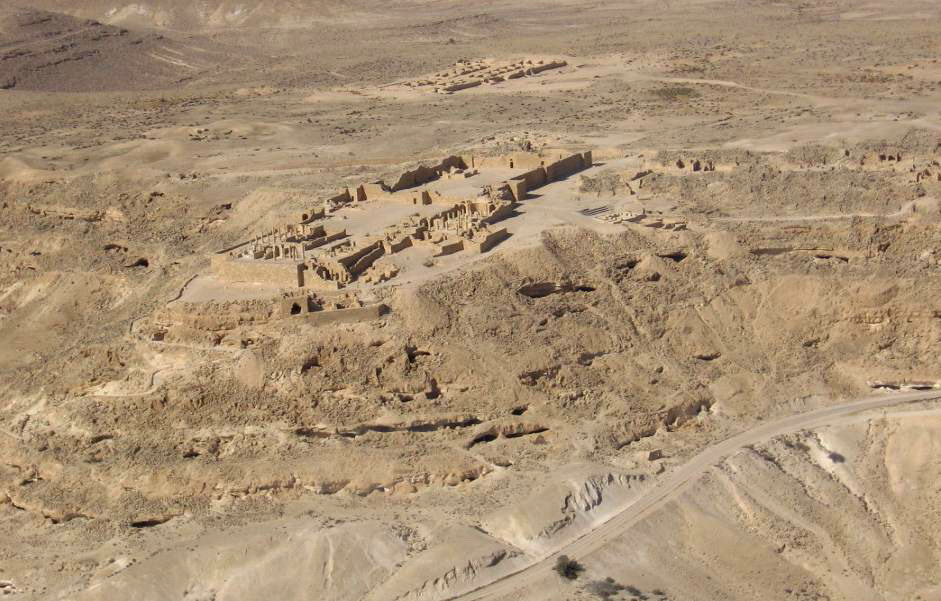
Avdat

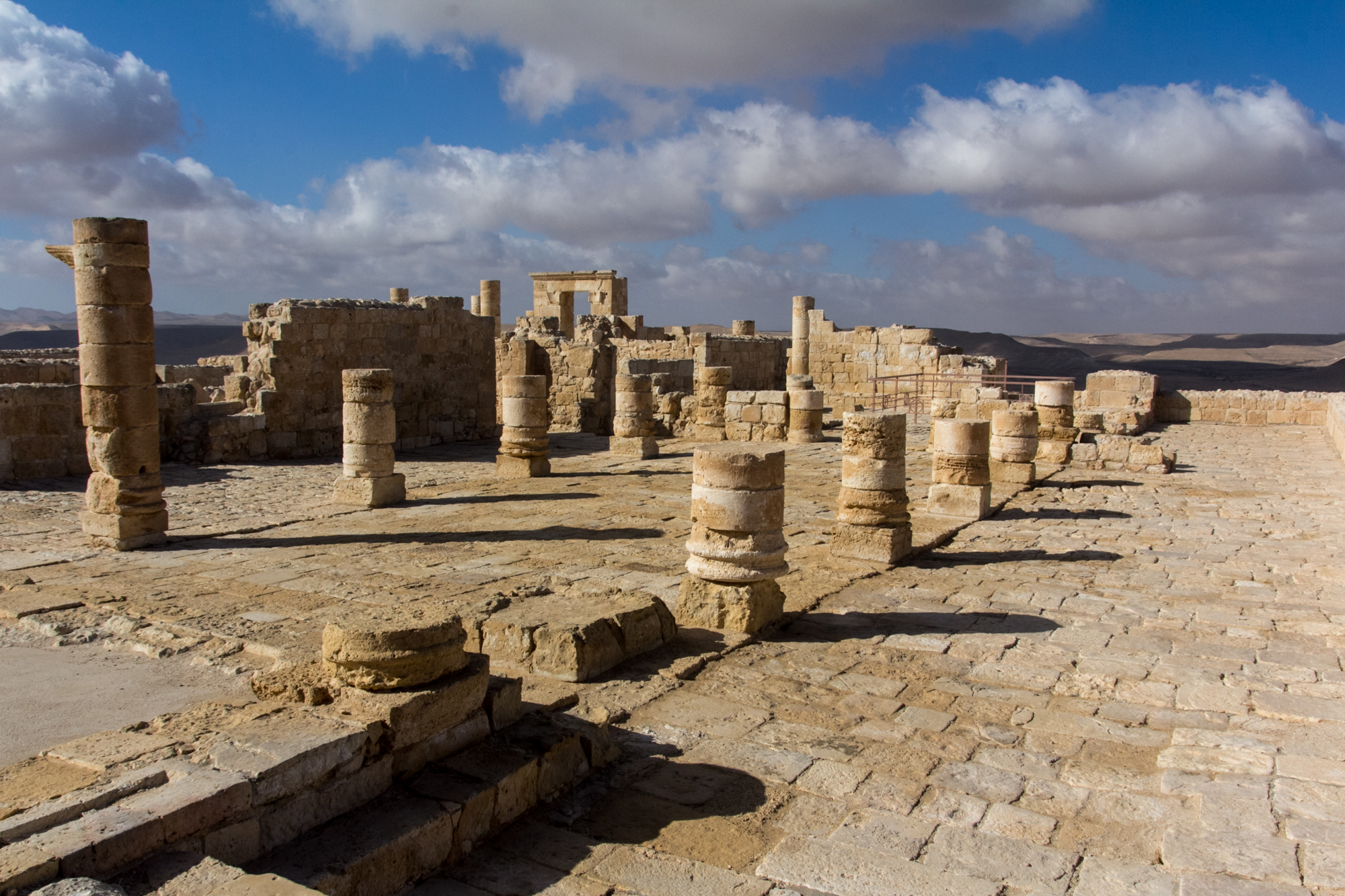
Ruins in Avdat

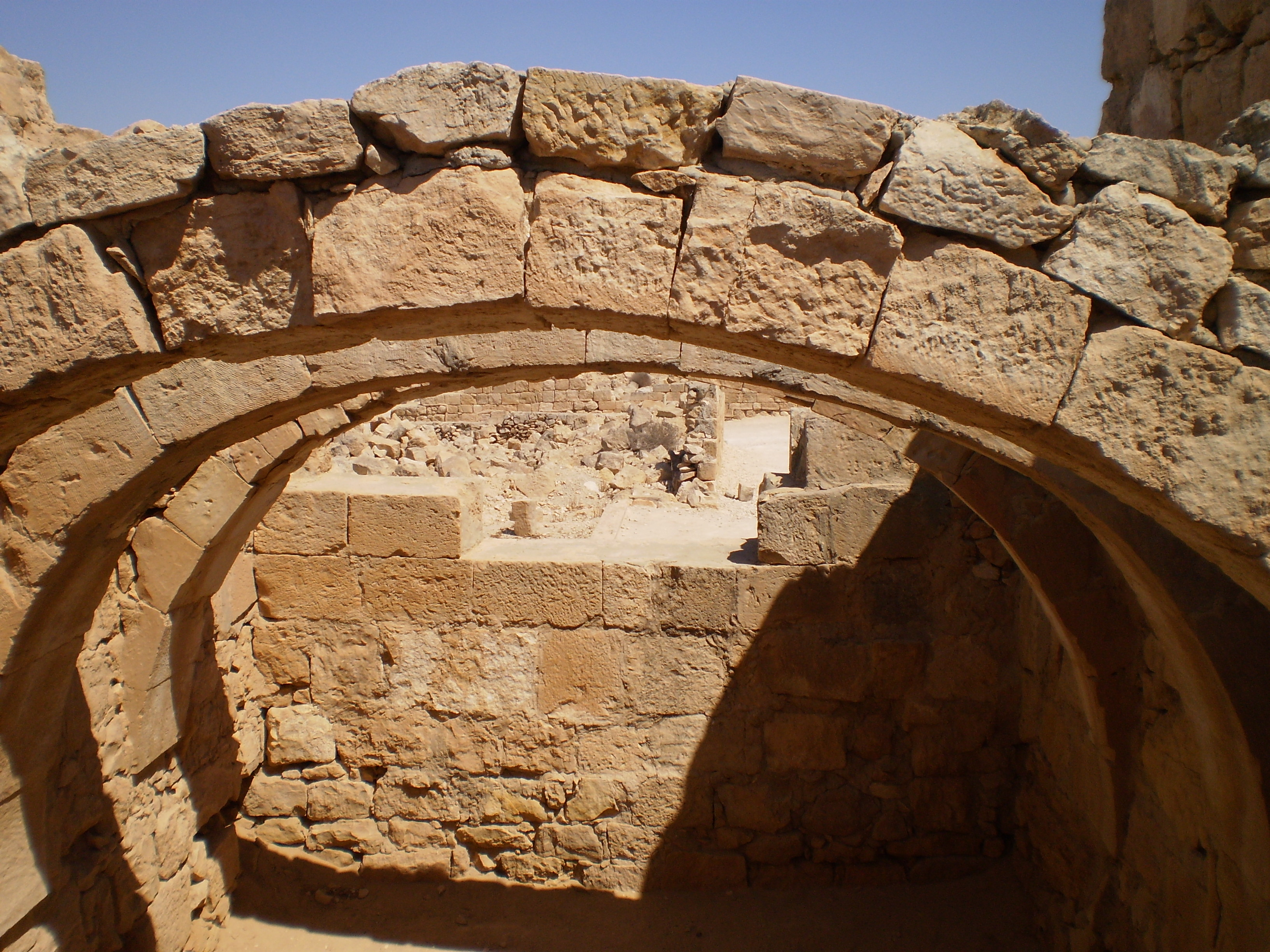
Ruins in Mamshit

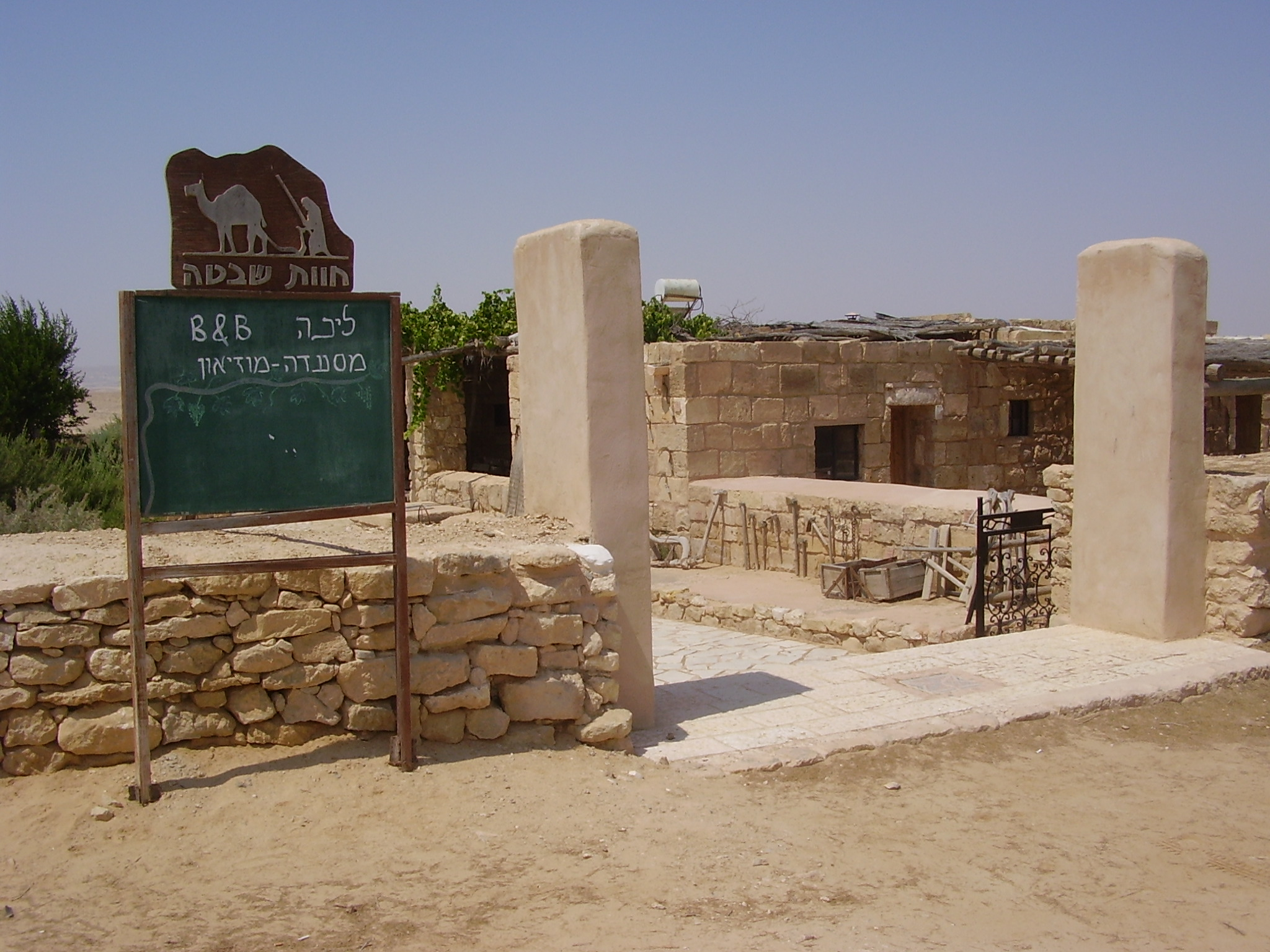
Ruins of Shivta

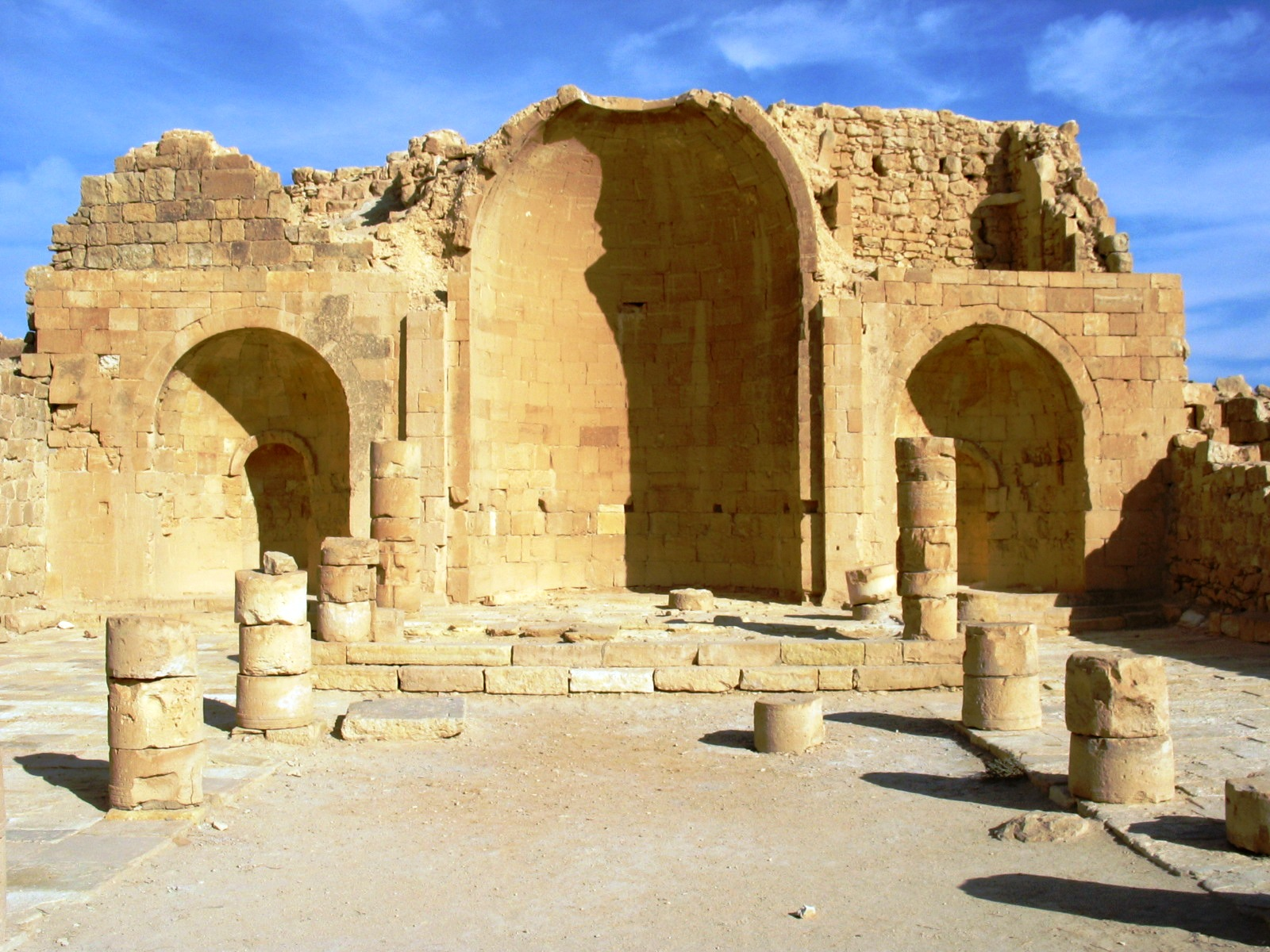
Ruins of church at Shivta

The network of the Incense Route consisted of trade routes that encompassed towns and cities in a stretch of more than 2,000 kilometres (1,200 mi). The site covers an area of 6,655 hectares (16,440 acres) with an additional buffer zone of 63,868 hectares (157,820 acres). The Mediterranean was the first link on this route in the Negev Desert to the southern part of Israel in a route of 200 kilometres (120 mi) length, with Moa on the eastern border and with Jordan to Haluza on the northwestern side. The entire route was benefited by the trade and villages prospered with innovative irrigation systems. Agricultural development was distinctly visible in the four villages of Haluza, Mamshit, Avdat and Shivta, and in the four fortresses; and the caravanserai of Moa and Saharonim facilitating the stay of the traders. The site nominated on the World Heritage List covers the land features of the area and a route length of 50 kilometres (31 mi) from Petra to Gaza covering Avdat and Moa towns, further north of Haluza town; to the west of the route, the Shivta town; Mamshit town between Petra and Damascus. The Nabateans, settlers in the area, developed sophisticated irrigation practices and they were also pastorals dependent on livestock development of sheep, cattle, and goats. They domesticated camels which they used extensively as caravans on the incense route.

=== Avdat ===
The Avdat is within an area of 300 by 400 metres (980 ft × 1,310 ft) perched 80 metres (260 ft) above the plains in the western part of the Ramon-Nafkha highlands. It is surrounded by a wall built of limestone, and housed within it are the remnants of a Nabatean temple, a fort, a main street, two churches and a caravanserai. Also visible are short walls and arched roofs.

=== Haluza ===
The Haluza town is in the northern extremity of the nominated site and is a desert with sand dunes which has buried most of the town. Recent excavations have unearthed remnants of two churches, a tower, a wine press, a theater, and a road.

=== Mamshit ===
The Mamshit town is at the western extreme end of the designated site and has been subject to extensive archaeological excavations. The excavations have revealed presence of a town wall, caravanserai, big private residences, a market road, and bathhouses. Some of the structures have been refurbished. The finds include frescoes and mosaics.

=== Shivta ===
The Shivta town is in the central Negev and has not been fully excavated. The finds unearthed so far have revealed remnants of double and triple storied houses, churches with apses, roads, a residence of the governor, a town square, a farm, wine presses, and many more. The building material used in construction of the buildings is limestone. There is no compound wall enclosing the village.

=== Fortresses ===
The fortresses in the area are:

The Moa Fort and Caravanserai at the east end of the nominated site are close to the Jordanian border, and are built of dressed limestone. The fort overlooks the caravanserai located in the plains. The surviving fort walls are only of 3 metres (9.8 ft) height, and of 1.25 metres (4 ft 1 in) height in the case of caravanserai. Ruins of a well laid out water system sourced from underground springs and feeding the bathhouse through a canal to the caravanserai also exist at the site. Other finds include agricultural tools from the fort.

The Kasra Fort which lies to the west of Moa on a hill feature above the Kasra Wadi (river) has evidence of fossil limestone walls to a height of 3 metres (9.8 ft).

The Nekarot Fort is also to the west of the site and has ruined parts of a tower in square shape next to a courtyard yard.

The Makhmal Fort, square in shape, is in ruins with 1.5 to 2 metres (4 ft 11 in to 6 ft 7 in) high walls built of limestone blocks. Graffon Fortress, similar in design to Makhmal fortress, is also in ruins with only meter high walls visible.

=== Caravanserai ===
There is a large caravanserai towards the west of the site. Soft clay stones and burnt clay bricks have been used in its construction. Apart from the living rooms, it has chambers for cooking, washing and workplaces. It is also in ruins with only about 2 metres (6 ft 7 in) high walls. Large area of agricultural land formed in terraces surround this caravanserai.

=== Agriculture ===
Agriculture practiced by the Nabateans in the arid desert conditions where the annual precipitation is of the order 100 millimetres (3.9 in), is through a well developed irrigation system consisting of hundreds of small dams, channels, cisterns, and reservoirs which collect flood water. The agricultural fields have been noted on the river banks and hill slopes in Avdat and central Negev where a very large number of water collection cairns built in stone are present.

=== Other finds ===
Twenty-two milestones have been found in the Nafha Highlands and the Ramon Makhtesh areas between the Makhmal Fort and the Saharonim Fort. They are cylindrical in shape with square bases made of stone. Field stones are also seen set in different patterns at road crossings, or as religious sites. One stretch of such arranged stones is 100 metres (330 ft) in length. Road sections are also discerned in several stretches of the route.

== See also ==
- Archaeology of Israel
- Bosra
- Frankincense trail
- Ir Ovot
- Rehovot-in-the-Negev, city on the incense trade route

== Bibliography ==
- Zohar, Gil (2015). The Experience of Israel: Sights and Cities. Mitchell Lane Publishers, Inc. ISBN 978-1-61228-691-4.
- Nathanson, Michael (2013). Between Myth & Mandate: Geopolitics, Pseudohistory & the Hebrew Bible. AuthorHouse. ISBN 978-1-4918-2308-8.
