= Mampsis =

Ancient city in Israel

- ממשית (Hebrew)
- Mamshit; Memphis
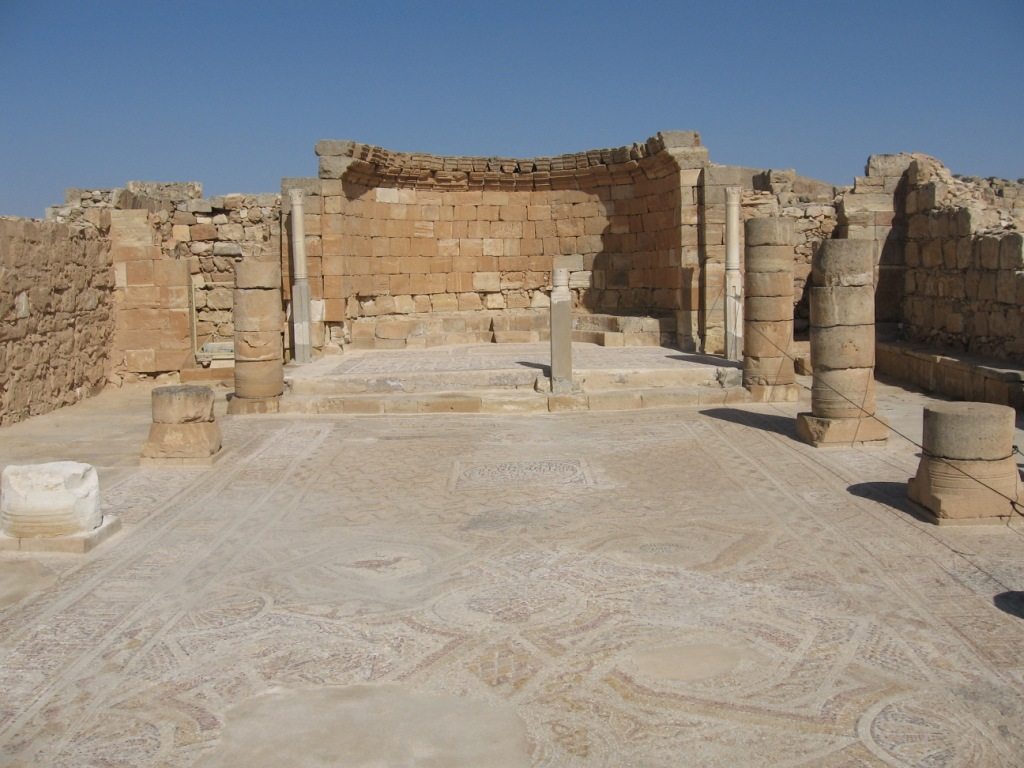
- The Mampsis Church

- Location within Israel
- 31.025°N 35.064°E
- Type: Settlement
- Cultures: Nabataean, Roman, Byzantine
- Location: Southern District, Israel
- Region: Negev

History
- Built: 1st century BCE

Site notes
- Condition: In ruins

UNESCO World Heritage Site
- Official name: Incense Route - Desert Cities in the Negev (Haluza, Mamshit, Avdat and Shivta)
- Type: Cultural
- Criteria: iii, v
- Designated: 2005 (29th session)
- Reference no.: 1107
- Region: Europe and North America

Mampsis (Medieval Greek: Μάμψις) or Memphis (Ancient Greek: Μέμφις), today Mamshit (Hebrew: ממשית), Kurnub (Arabic: كرنب), is a former Nabataean caravan stop and Byzantine city. In the Nabataean period, Mampsis was an important station on the Incense Road, connecting Southern Arabia through Edom, the Arabah and Ma'ale Akrabim, to the Mediterranean ports, as well as to Jerusalem via Beersheba and Hebron. The city covers 10 acres (40,000 m^{2}) and is the smallest but best restored ancient city in the Negev Desert. The once-luxurious houses feature unusual architecture not found in any other Nabataean city.

The reconstructed city gives the visitor a sense of how Mampsis once looked. Entire streets have survived intact, and there are also large groups of Nabataean buildings with open rooms, courtyards, and terraces. The stones are carefully chiseled and the arches that support the ceiling are remarkably well constructed.

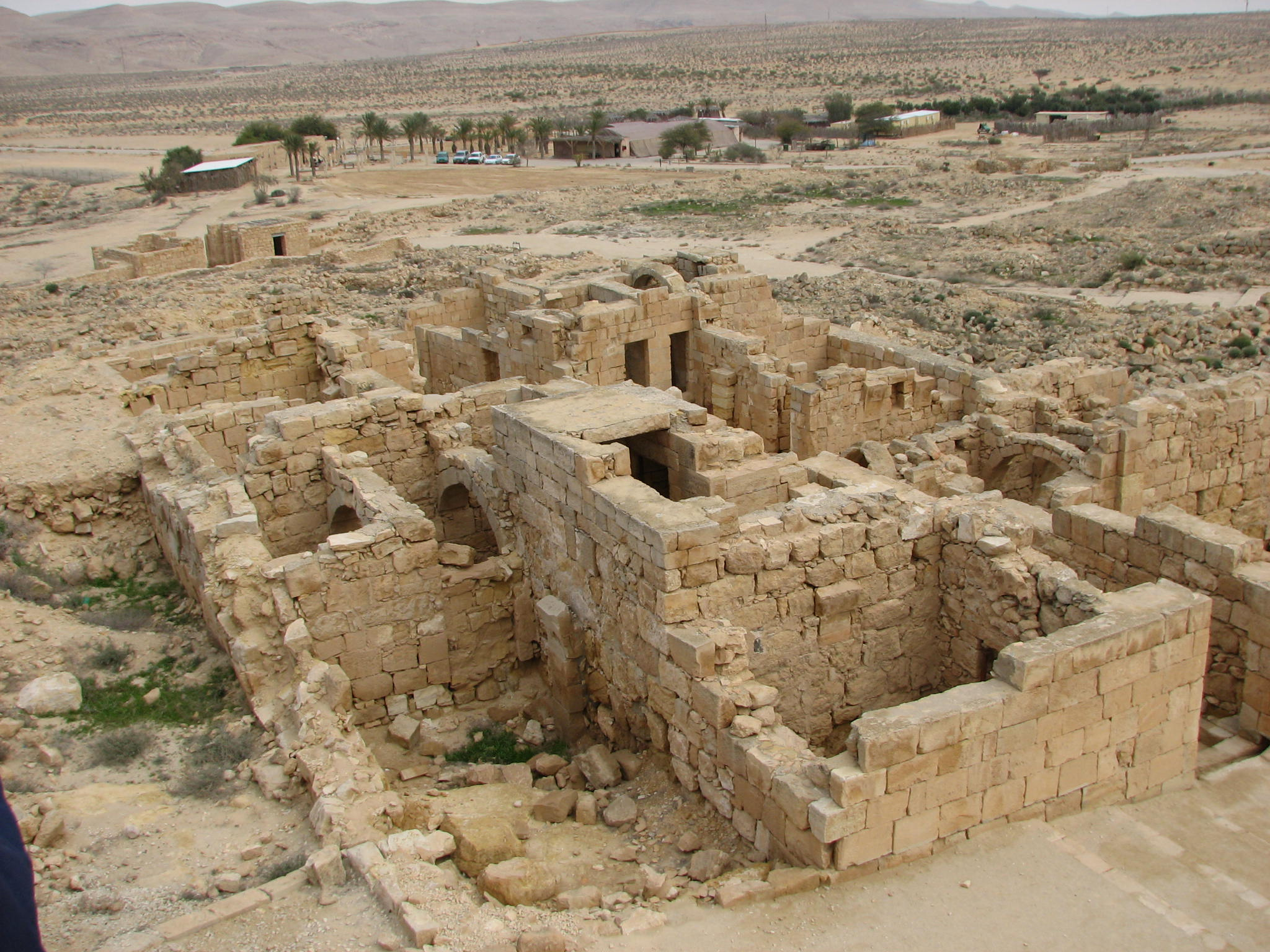
Ancient living quarters in Mampsis.

The Incense Route - Desert Cities in the Negev, including Mampsis, Haluza, Avdat, and Shivta, were declared a World Heritage Site by UNESCO in June 2005.

== Name ==
The Medieval Greek name Mampsis (Μαμψις) appears on the Madaba map and in the writings of Church Fathers.

The Negev Naming Committee chose to Hebraize the name as Mamshit (ממשית), with one committee member stating that it is "impossible to leave the name Mampsis because it's a foreign name"; the committee concluded that Mamshit was the original Hebrew name, which had been distorted by the Greeks.

The name in Arabic, Kurnub, is a drink made from camel milk and date honey.

== History ==
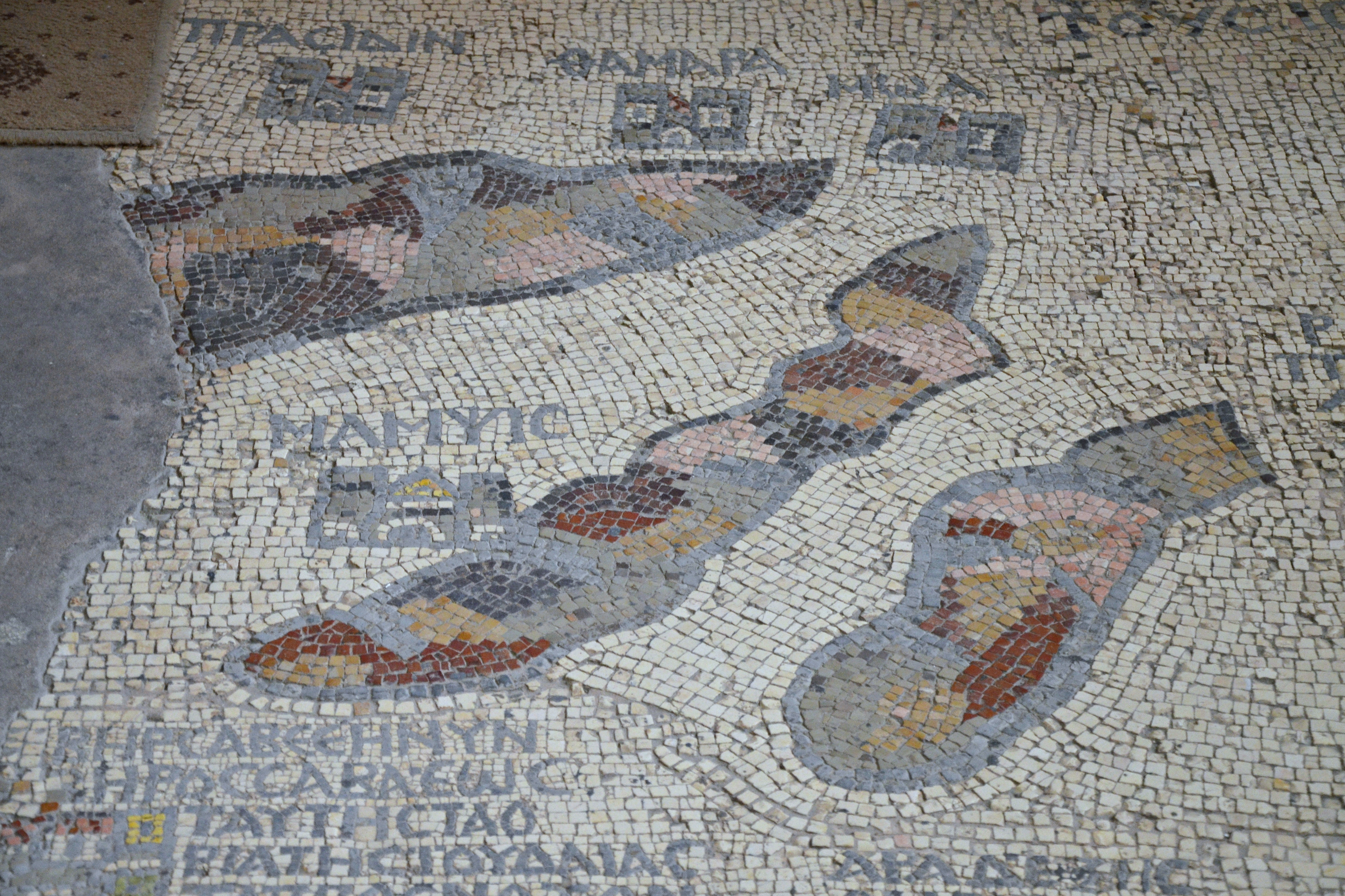
Mampsis on the Madaba map

Mampsis was founded in the 1st century BCE as trade post between Petra and Gaza. Also based on agriculture, it continued to develop over time. When its trade with the Roman occupation waned, the city developed a lucrative trade breeding fine horses, notably, the renowned Arabian horse.

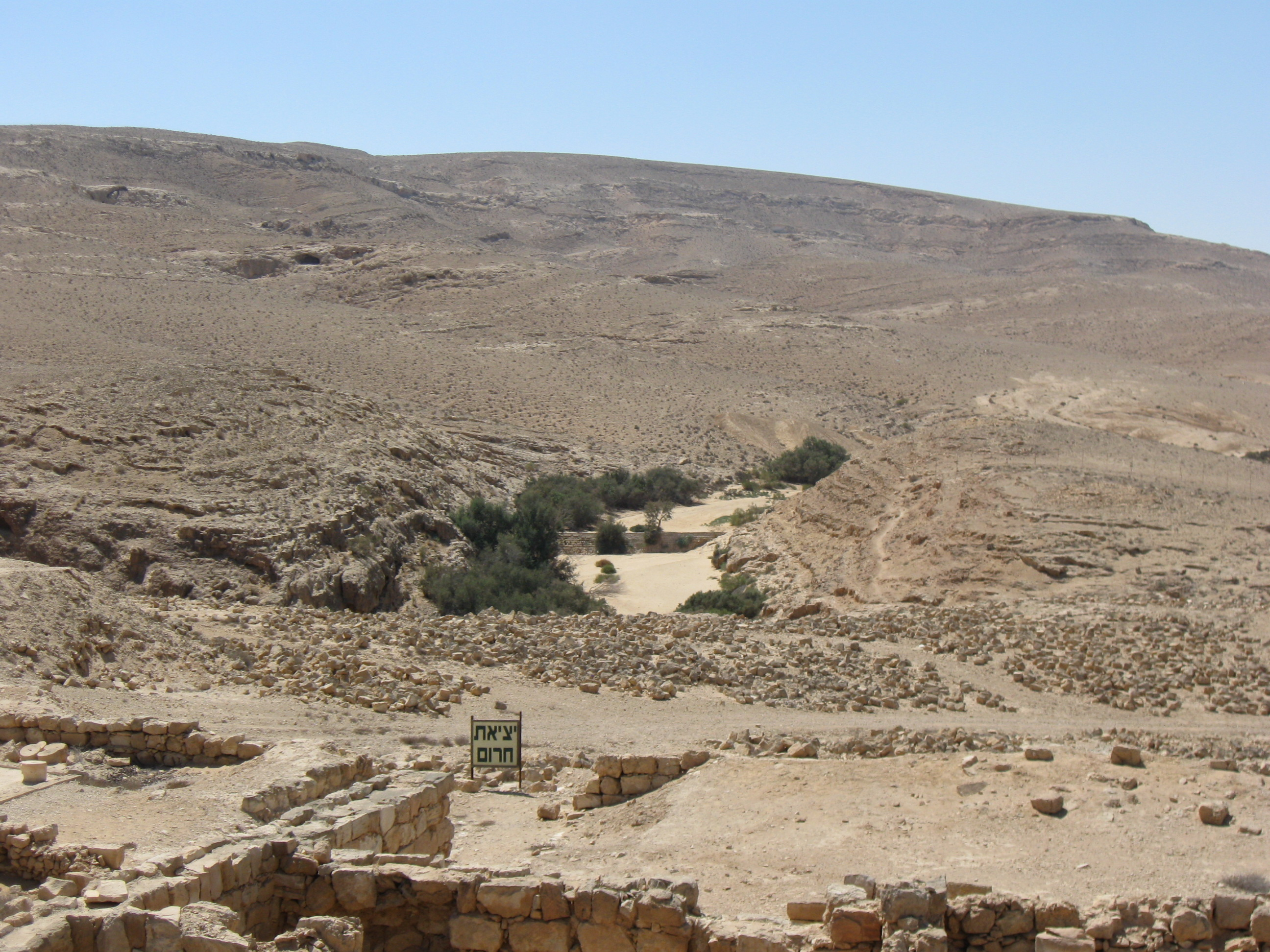
The dam that blocks Mampsis river south of the city

In 106, after the city was annexed to the Roman Empire, a Roman garrison was stationed there to guard part of the southern border of the empire and large dams were built around it, two of which have survived to this day.

During the Byzantine period, between the 3rd and 5th centuries C.E., Mampsis received support from the authorities as a frontier city until the time of Justinian I. When this funding ceased, the city went into decline and had practically ceased to exist by the middle of the 6th century C.E.

Before the founding of the State of Israel, Prime Minister to-be David Ben-Gurion saw Mampsis as the capital of the future country, which dovetailed with his dream of settling the Negev Desert.

== Research on the site ==
The site was first mentioned by the archaeologist Ulrich Jasper Zatzen in the first decade of the 19th century and later in the century it was explored on several occasions. The first thorough survey was conducted by the Alois Musil in 1901. In 1937, the British Foundation for the Investigation of the Land of Israel and its Antiquities conducted another detailed survey of the site, and in 1956-1957, excavations were carried out on behalf of the Hebrew University and the National Parks Authority. In 1972 the place was opened for visits.

== Discoveries ==
Two churches were discovered in Mampsis. The western St. Nilus Church has a mosaic floor with colorful geometric patterns, birds, a fruit basket, and five dedications in Greek. The eastern church has a lectern on small marble pillars, the remnants of which can be seen at the site.

Extensive fortified residential compounds featuring a singular entrance were found that were timed to the 2nd century C.E. These complexes incorporated stable yards, storage facilities, and living quarters. Two burial sites were unearthed.

The biggest hoard ever found in Israel was discovered in Mampsis, consisting of 10,500 silver coins with a total weight of 72 kg. Other findings include a lead ingot with its foundry markings, a collection of ancient Greek texts on papyrus, and other objects indicative of wealth.

== Gallery ==
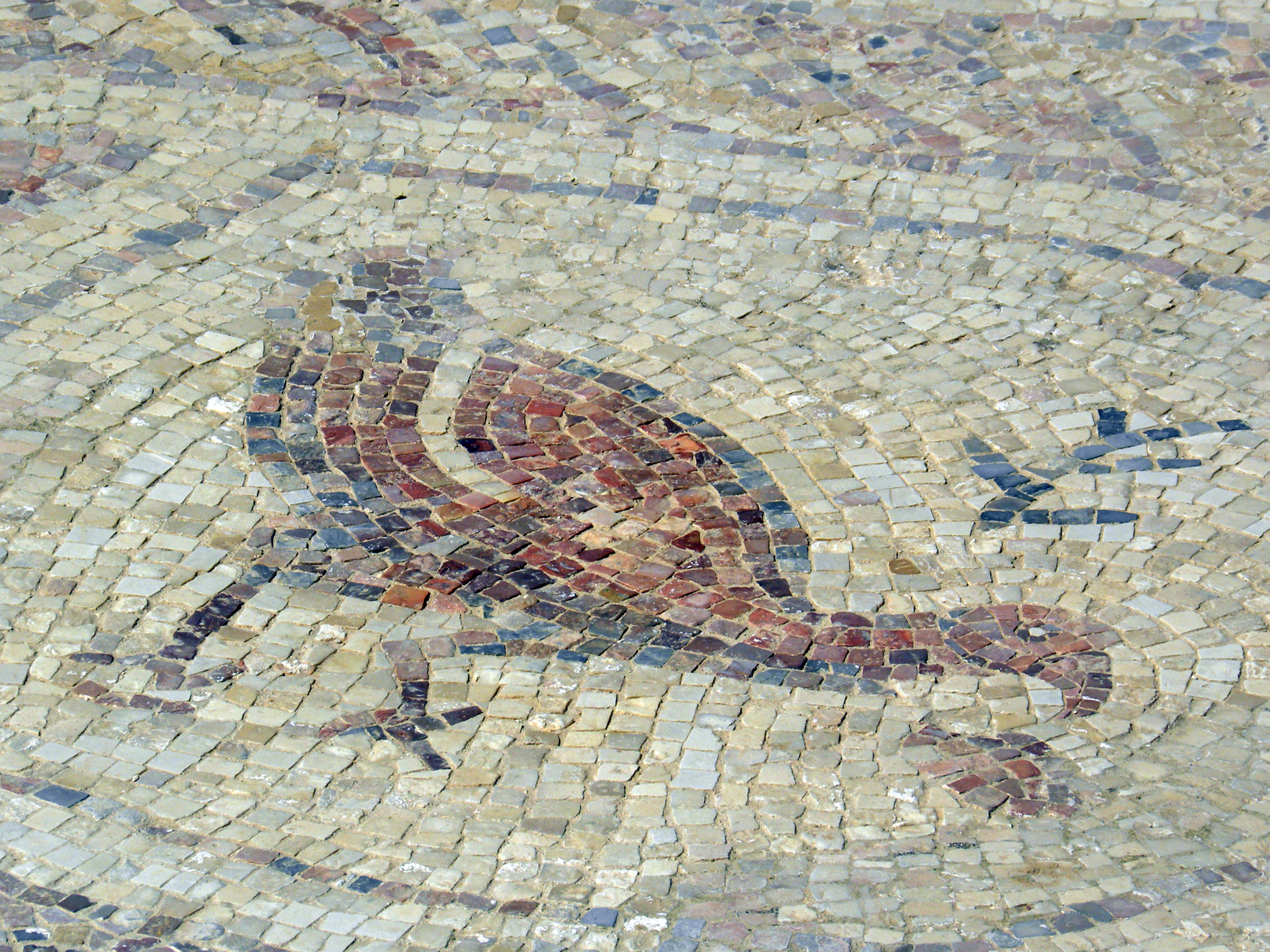
Mosaic floor of the Church of St. Nilus, Mampsis

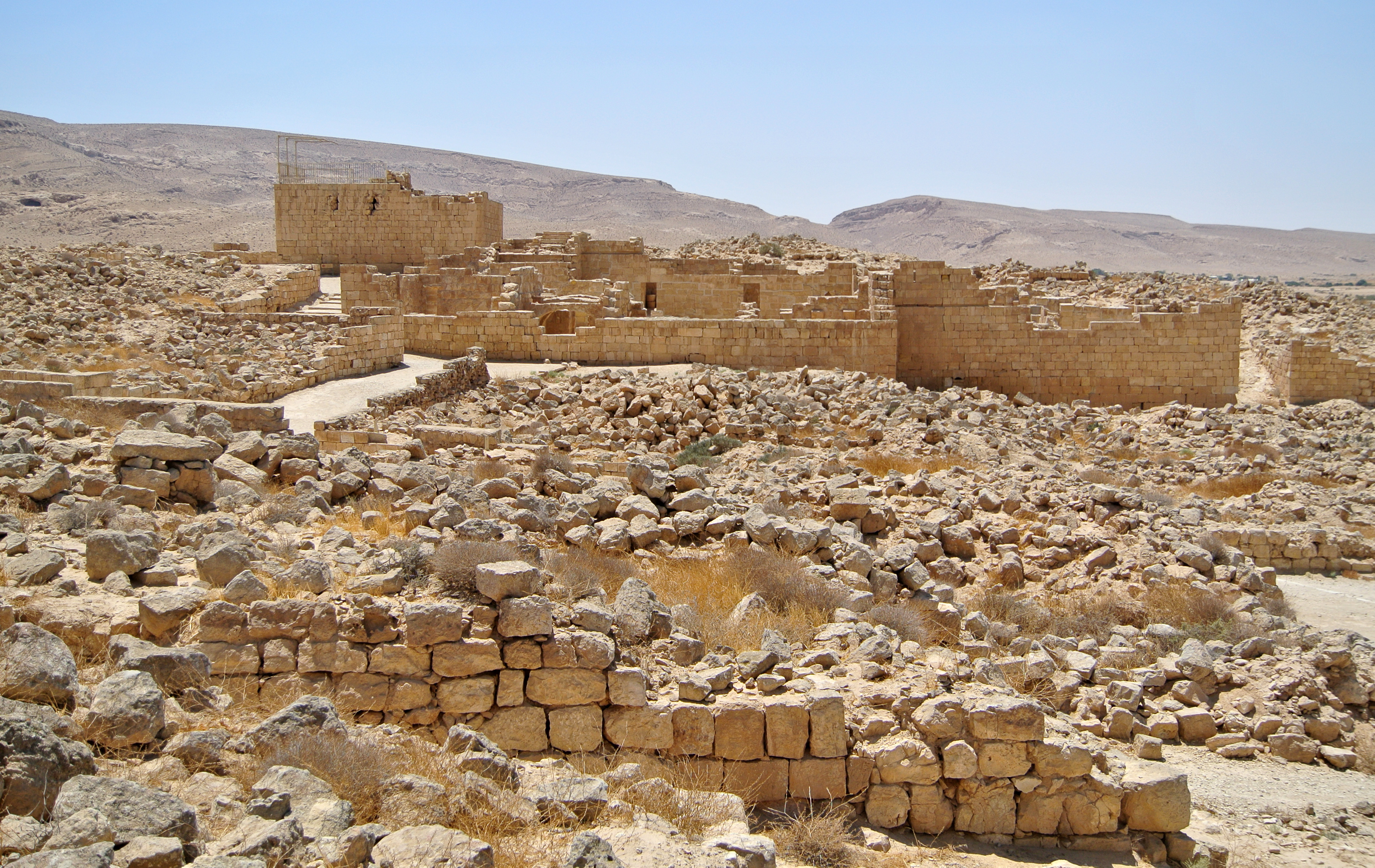
The Guardhouse (left) and Wealthy House (right).

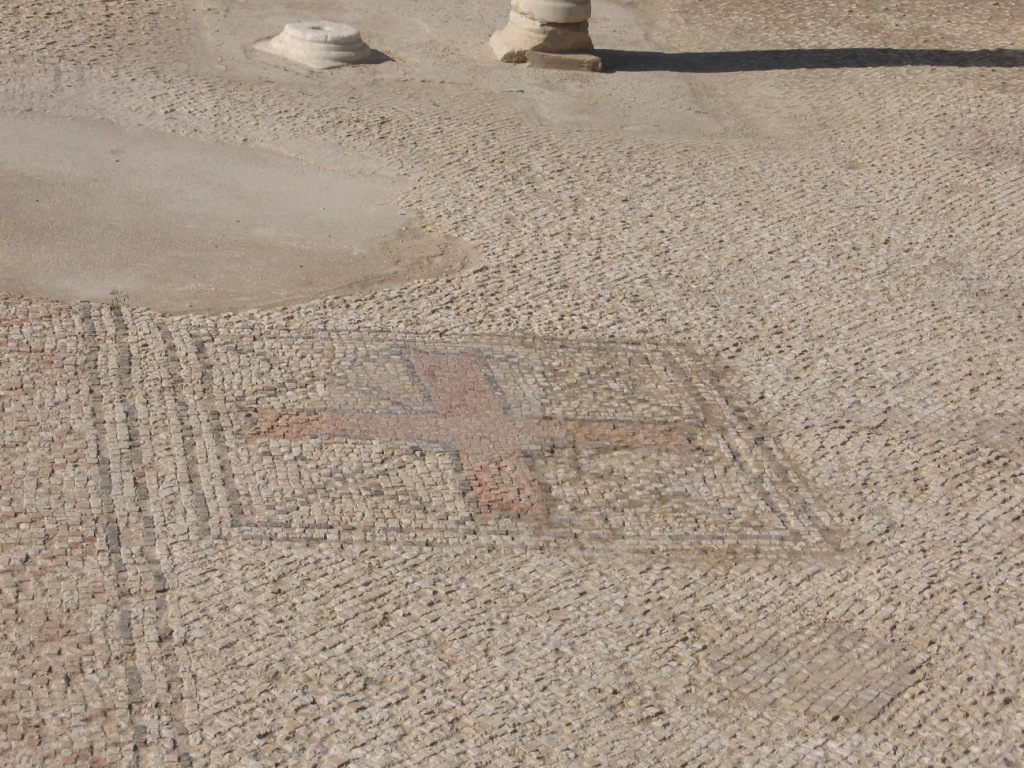

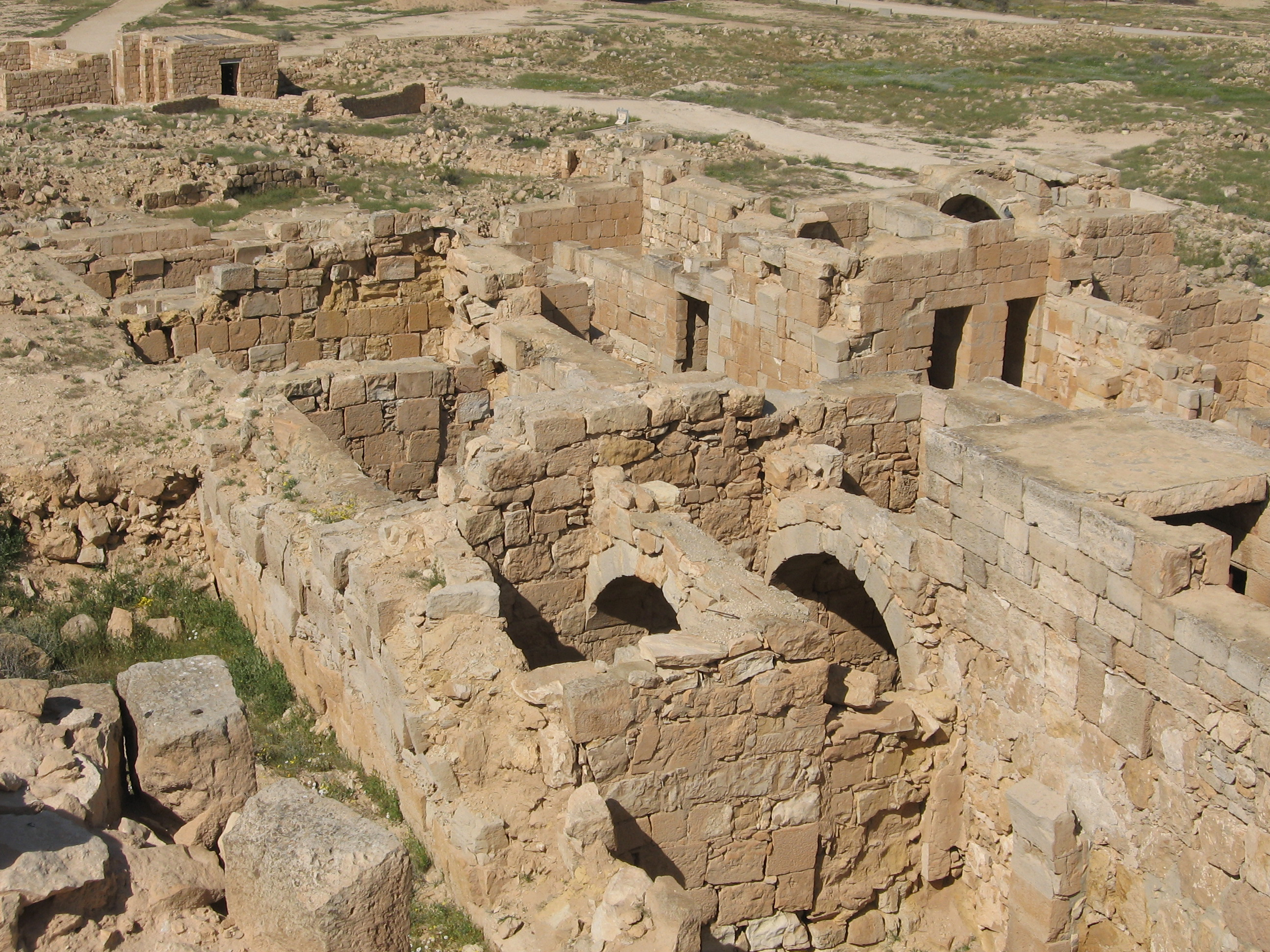
