= Ancient history of the Negev =

The Negev region, situated in the southern part of present-day Israel, has a long and varied history that spans thousands of years. Despite being predominantly a semi-desert or desert, it has historically almost continually been used as farmland, pastureland, and an economically significant transit area.

The ancient history of the Negev includes periods of Egyptian and Nabataean dominance, the rise of local cultures such as the Edomites, and notable agricultural and architectural developments during the Byzantine and early Islamic eras.

== Historical regions of the Negev ==
For historical purposes, the Negev can roughly be divided into four subregions:

- The biblical Negev (yellow), referring to the small, semi-arid northeastern Arad-Beersheba Valley (see Tel Arad and Tel Be'er Sheva). Only this area is referred to as the "Negev" in the Bible, as according to biblical historiography, the holdings of the Judeans in the Negev were confined to this region.
- The northern Negev (green). In biblical times, it was inhabited by the Philistines and from the 6th century B.C. by Idumeans and the so-called "Post-Philistines," whose ethnic identity remains a matter of debate. This region is also predominantly semi-desert, but it was already intensively used for agriculture during biblical times and developed, especially in the post-biblical period, into one of the most important agricultural regions of Palestine. The northern boundary is indistinct and defined differently by various scholars across disciplines. The border shown on the map corresponds to the Ottoman Beersheba District, which is both one of the northernmost and one of the most commonly used boundaries in historical accounts.
- The central Negev (orange) is even drier; in the Bible, this area was therefore called the "Desert of Zin". In the northwest, it mainly consists of sand dunes; the rest is predominantly composed of the Negev Highlands, which, as recent research suggests, were probably called "Mount Seir" in the Bible, previously thought to be located east of the Jordan River.
- Finally, the southern Negev (red) has no special name in the Bible. It is the driest region of Palestine, with consistently less than 100 mm of rainfall per year. Originally, it was important mainly for its mineral resources, but starting from the time of the Nabateans, it was also used for agriculture.

== Bronze Age and Early Iron Age: The copper miners of the Negev Highlands ==
=== Bronze Age and early Iron Age: Regional history ===
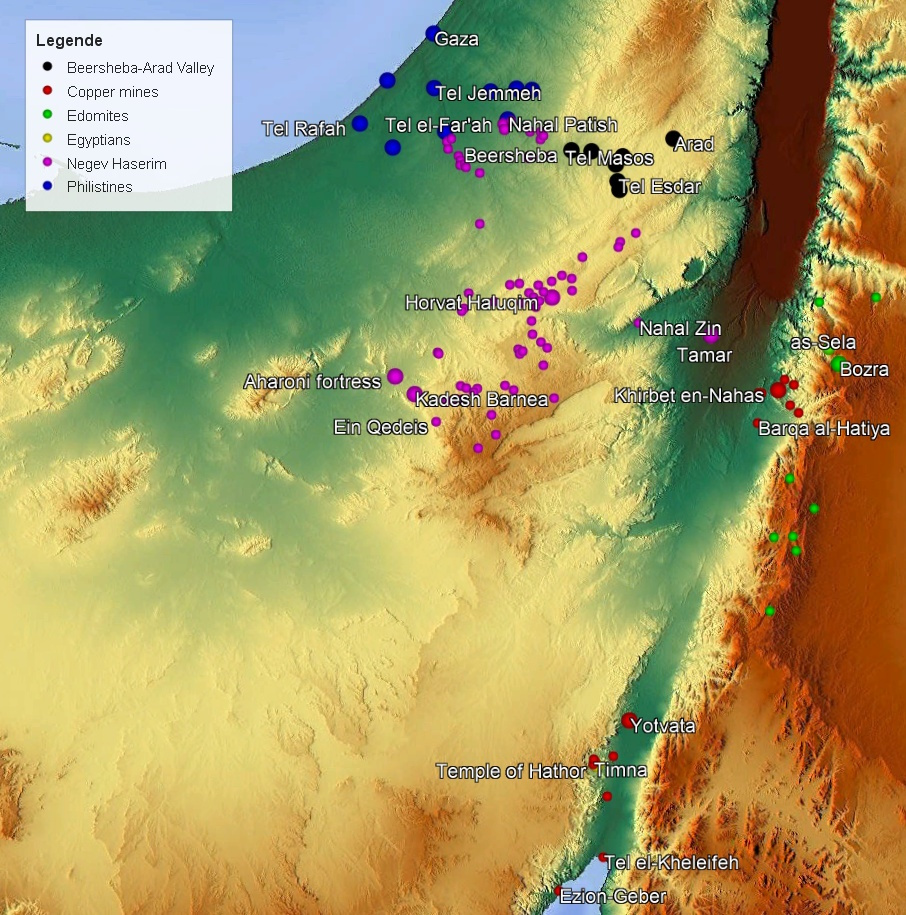
Negev and surroundings in the Iron Age I-IIa

According to Egyptian written records, during the Bronze Age (up to the 13th century BCE) and the early Iron Age, it was the Shasu nomads who lived in the Negev and the Sinai Peninsula under Egyptian rule. Since these are referred to, among others, as the "tribes of the Shasu of Edom," it is assumed that from this ethnic group, the Edomites emerged later, and subsequently, the Idumeans (see below).

The Egyptians operated a copper mine in the Timna Valley, as evidenced by a Hathor temple from that period. After the Egyptians withdrew, another group took over the copper mine. This group also constructed a fortress-like road station at the Yotvata oasis, notably using the casemate building technique, and established another copper mine at Khirbet en-Nahas.

In the Beersheba–Arad Valley, a complex of several casemate buildings also emerged in the 12th century BCE, known as Tel Masos, the region's first capital (until it was replaced by nearby Tel Malḥata as the new capital from the 10th to the 8th century BCE.). From Tel Masos and Yotvata, this architectural style spread throughout the Negev region between the 11th to 8th centuries BCE, with sites like Tel Esdar, Khirbet en-Nahas, Beersheba and Arad adopting similar structures. Additionally, during this time, many more farms, known as "haserim" ("enclosed homesteads"), developed, especially along the streams and brooks up to the vicinity of the Philistine locations Nahal Patish and Tell el-Far'ah (South). Gazit notes that there were 36 Haserim of at least 0.25 hectares in size in the 11th century alone in the region, along with many smaller farms. Moreover, in the same period, about 60 small casemate buildings appeared in the Negev Highlands. Many of these sites also had additional smaller buildings, totaling several hundred. These settlements were likely involved in operating the copper mines, which is supported by the presence of copper slags from the Arabah in Negevite pottery.

These archaeological finds are primarily interpreted in two different ways. Initially, biblical archaeologists interpreted the casemate buildings in the highlands as the garrisons mentioned in 2 Samuel 8:14, which states that King David built garrisons "throughout all Edom", which is why they are still referred to as "fortresses" today. This interpretation was gradually abandoned in the early 1990s: Archaeologists, noting that Yotvata, Tel Masos, and the copper mines were built and operated more than 100 years before David's time, emphasizing that the buildings in the Negev were clearly no "fortresses," and showcasing distinct architectural styles and ceramics different from those in the Judean settlement area, proposed alternative theories. They suggested that either the ancestors of the Edomites built the Negev localities and operated the copper mines, governed by the "Tel Masos chiefdom", or that alongside these nomadic people, a third, unknown sedentary people also lived there, with one of these two groups controlling the copper mines. However, in 2023, Tali Erickson-Gini once again advocated the older "Israel hypothesis," claiming that this interpretation had been consciously "swept under the rug" by archaeologists.

=== Early Iron Age: Agricultural history ===
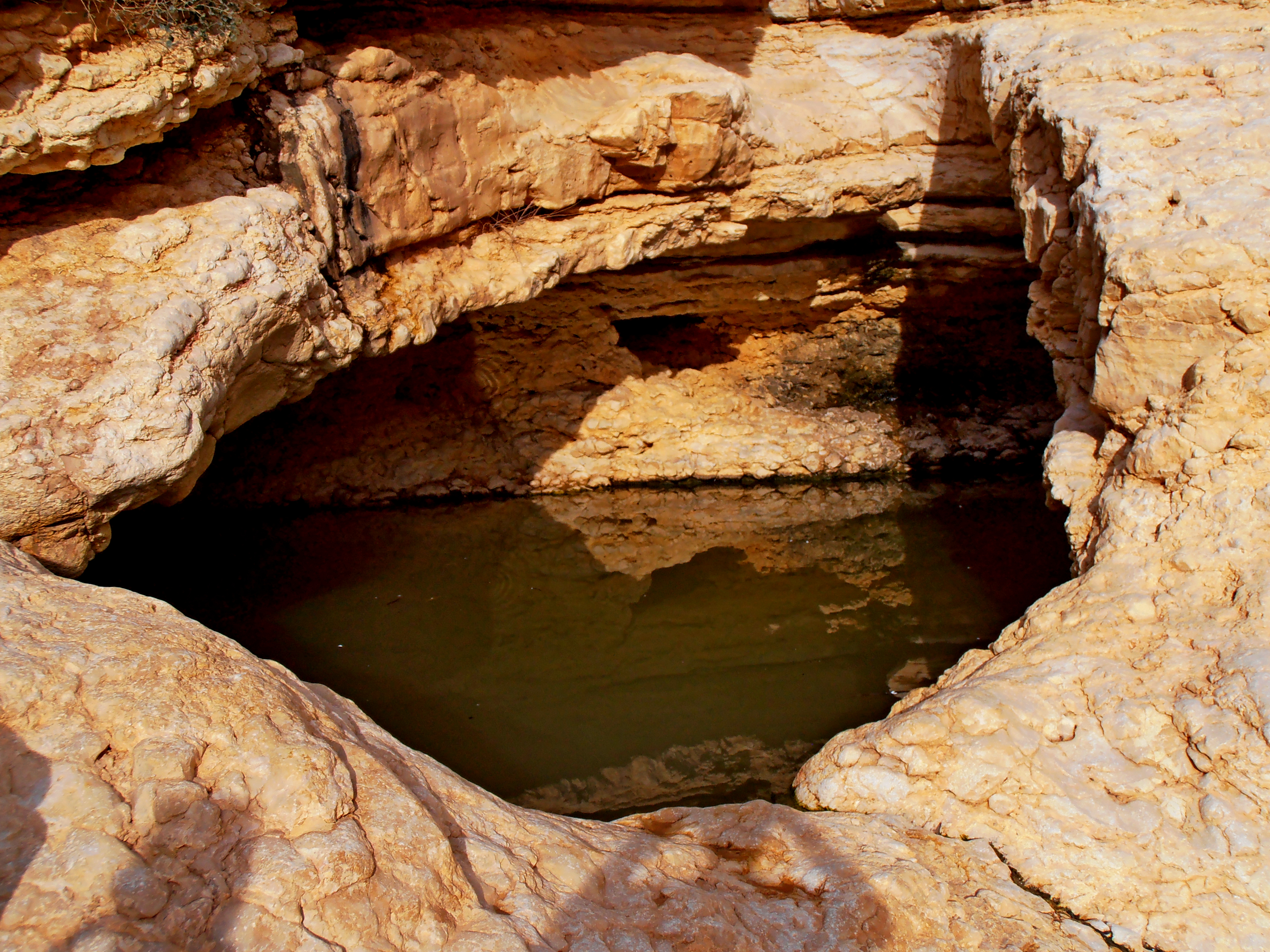
A Negevite cistern

External images
- Layout of a Negev farm.
- Terraces with dammed water.
- Terraces with growing grain.

The high number of Early Iron Age buildings in the Negev Highlands, with surveys identifying nearly 450 in total, is surprising given the area's low rainfall, typically less than 200 mm/year. However, the Negevites appear to have developed innovative agricultural techniques to cope with these conditions:

- They built their buildings near the small wadis of the Negev Highlands, where they carved cisterns into the rock to capture and store winter rainwater.
- They also constructed terraced fields along these wadis, designed to channel flowing water from the wadis and running water from the wadi slopes to plants and slow drainage, thus maximizing moisture retention and minimizing soil erosion.

Michael Evenari demonstrated at his experimental Avdat farm that this farming method could successfully grow even grapes with less than 100 mm/year of rainfall.

However, interpretations differ regarding the timing of terrace construction. It is clear that the majority of the millions of wadi terraces still found in the Negev today originated in the Byzantine and Early Islamic periods (see below). However, excavated blades, silos and threshing floors from the Iron Age, along with new Radiocarbon and OSL datings, suggest that some terraces were built as early as the Iron Age or even earlier.

Conversely, research teams led by Israel Finkelstein investigated ancient dung heaps in the Negev mountains and at the Timna mines and discovered that in the central Negev, small livestock primarily grazed on wild-growing winter and spring plants, while in the Timna area, they were mainly fed hay and grape pomace. Accordingly, they suggest that the practice of crop cultivation in the Negev mountains during the rainy season might have started later. If this is accurate, the Iron Age Negevites likely lived in the Negev mountains during the rainy season, practicing only livestock farming there. During the summer, they moved south to mine copper and imported grain and grape pomace from the Philistines and Judeans in the north. If one accepts the early dating of the agricultural terraces instead, it appears that Negevite society was structured such that they lived in the Negev mountains during the rainy season, engaging in crop and vine cultivation to stockpile supplies. During the summer, they moved down to the copper mines, mined copper, and fed their animals with the stored hay and grape pomace.

== Later Iron Age: Regional and economic history ==
The political situation of the Negevites and their neighboring peoples as well as territorial fluctuations at this time largely depended on the surrounding political superpowers:

- Following Hazael's conquest of the region of Palestine in the 9th century, the Judeans in the north grew stronger and expanded into the Beersheba-Arad Valley, as indicated by ceramics found in Arad and Aroer and ostraca found in Arad.
- The subsequent conquest of Palestine by the Assyrians in the 8th century brought a political and economic upswing for the Negevites (like the Philistines and in contrast to the Judeans). They expanded further east in the Beersheba-Arad Valley, beyond the borders shown on the map above, to places such as Horvat Qitmit, Horvat Uza, Horvat Radum, Mizpe Zohar, and the Gorer Tower.
- However, it was the conquest of Palestine by the Babylonians in the 6th century BCE that had the most significant impact on regional history. The Judean region north of the Negevites was almost completely destroyed, after which the Negevites advanced north into the more fertile Central Palestine. It is likely this invasion that the pronounced hatred for "Edom" in the later biblical texts originates from. This regional situation remained for the next few centuries: According to Diodorus Siculus and Josephus, even in the 1st century BCE and CE, the border between Judea and the Negevites ("Idumaea") was at the same level, namely "between Beth-zur and Hebron" or "near Gaza."

The economic background of this relocation appears to have been that deforestation had made further copper mining impossible: From the 12th to the 9th century BCE, copper mining was gradually intensified to such an extent that by the 9th century, a total of 460 tons per year were being extracted solely at Khirbet en-Nahas. This, however, led to an overexploitation of natural resources, which eventually brought copper production to a complete halt, as indicated by the analysis of charcoal remains.

Following the decline of copper mining, the Negevites appear to have increasingly focused on trade to the east. Camels seem to have been regularly used for trade starting from this period, as excavated camel and dromedary bones from the late 10th and early 9th centuries BCE suggest. It was also only from this time on that they expanded to the east of the Jordan river and founded Bozra and subsequently other towns along the King's Highway, which until recently were considered the "core territory" of Edom. The pottery found in these areas suggests that the same ethnic groups lived here as in the central Negev and (temporarily alongside Judeans) in the Beersheba-Arad Valley. Thus, when the Edomites relocated to Central Palestine, they left the Negev; subsequent survey results show that only 11 sites can be identified in the highlands from the following period (see below).

== Hellenistic period: Nabataeans ==
=== Early Nabataean period: Regional history ===
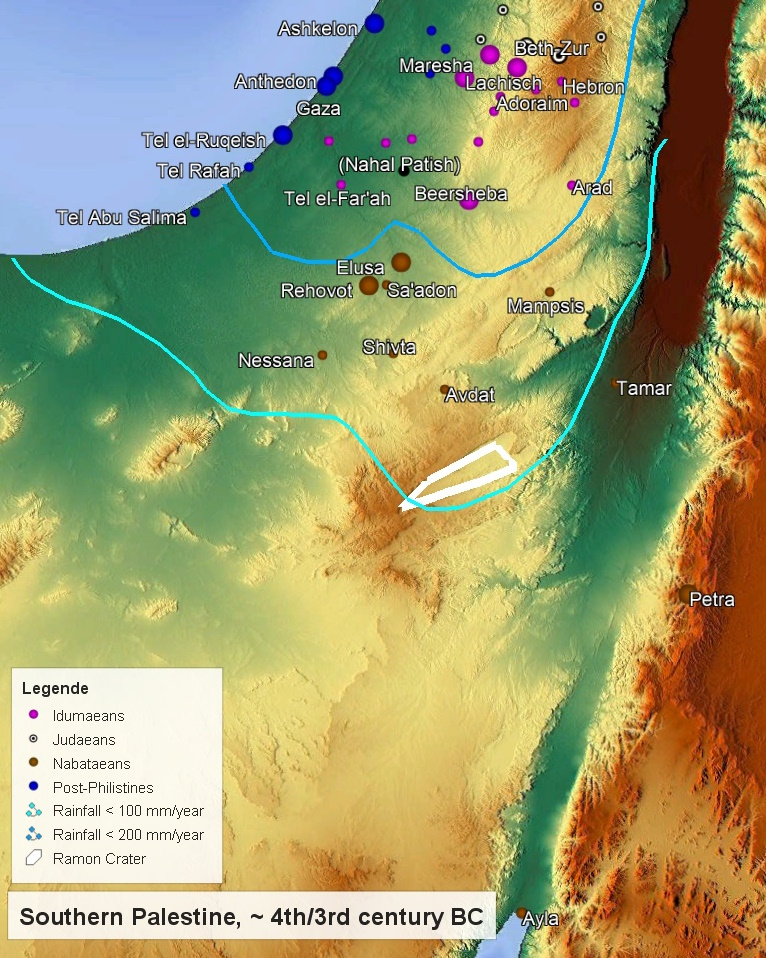
Southern Palestine, ~4th / 3rd century BC

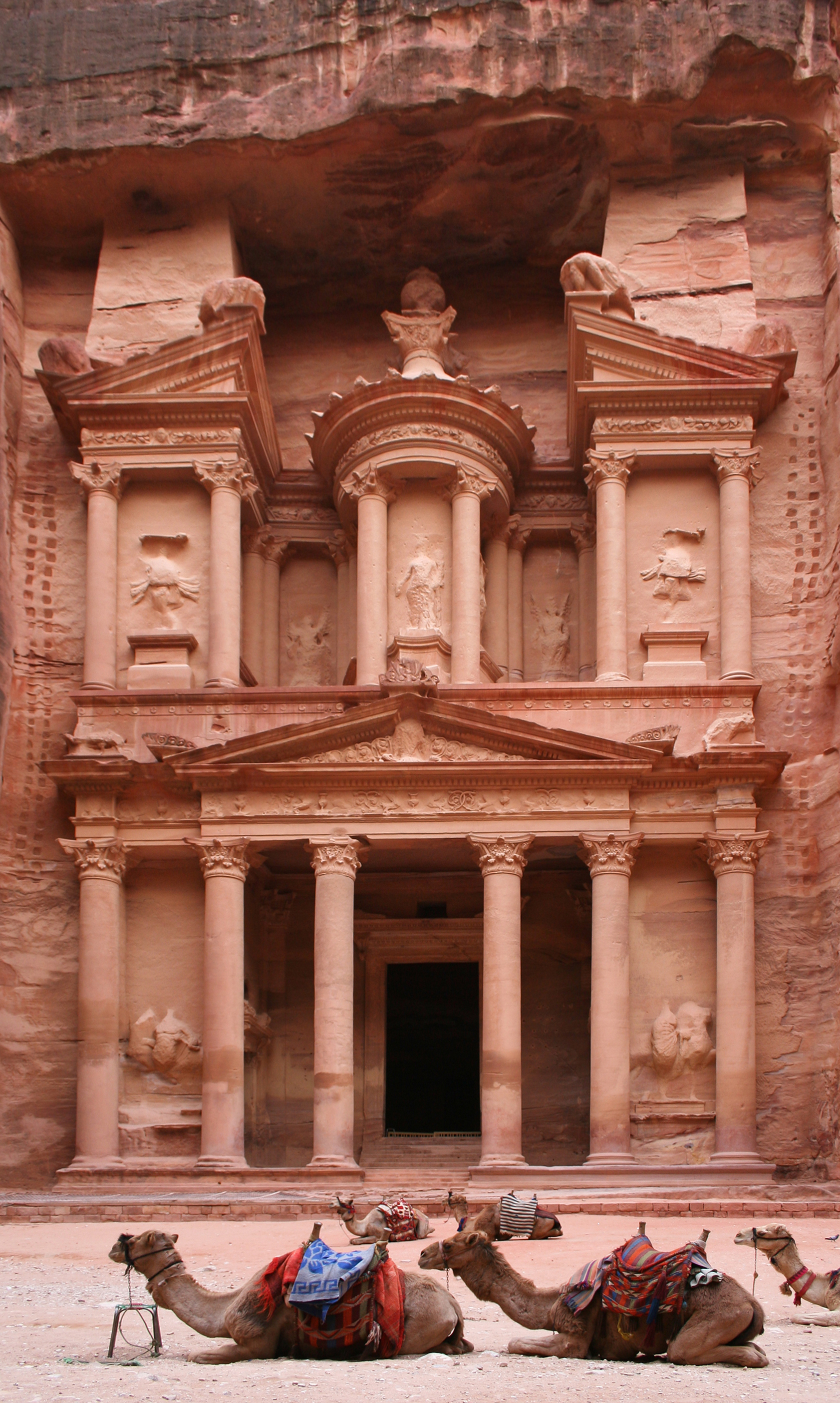
Al-Khazneh al-Firaun at Petra

Soon after, also the Idumeans living in ancient Edom east of the Jordan river were displaced by invading Arabian Qedarites and moved to join their kin in southern Judah. Subsequently, sometime between the late 4th and early 2nd century BC, these Qedarites were themselves pushed northwestward by the invading Nabateans. As a result, the Idumeans and Qedarites intermingled in southern Judah, while the Nabateans settled in the former territories of Edom east of the river Jordan, the Negev, and Sinai, taking control of these areas and the ancient trade routes. They established the so-called "desert towns" located along the Negev incense route at Avdat, Mampsis, Rehovot, Shivta, Nessana, and especially Elusa, which was to become the new capital and the only polis of the Negev.

=== Early Nabataean period: Agricultural history ===
Previously, it was believed that the early Nabateans were responsible for the terraced fields in the Negev Highlands, but archaeological evidence does not support this claim. Instead, the Nabateans are rightly famous for two other innovations in the arid desert landscape. First, they developed characteristic arched cisterns. More importantly, second, they constructed long water channels from perennial springs to their cities and villages (as in En Erga, En Ziq, and Qasr Ruheibeh in the central Negev, and En Rahel and Moyat Awad in the Arabah), which functioned in their early time mainly not as agricultural farms but as caravan stops and trade stations.

== Maccabean period: Regional history ==
Josephus reports that the Maccabees conquered the Idumean border towns of Maresha and Adoraim and gave the Idumaeans a choice: either be circumcised and adopt Jewish customs or leave the area. Some historians believe that events unfolded largely as Josephus describes: The Hasmoneans invaded Idumaea, conquered many towns, and forcibly converted the Idumaeans, who reluctantly accepted this conversion "out of attachment to their homeland."

External image
- Altar of Qos in Mamre

However, recent archaeological investigations have revealed (1) that Hasmonean conquests can be traced in only a few locations along the northern border of Idumaea (such as Khirbet er-Rasm, possibly Maresha and Lachish). In contrast, the vast majority of Idumaean settlements were abandoned without signs of conflict, remained abandoned for some time, and were later resettled by the same population group after the Hasmonean period. (2) Archaeologically, it does not appear that the Judeans forced the Idumaeans to undergo circumcision or to adopt "Jewish customs." The Idumaeans were already practicing circumcision, and other practices that later came to be seen as "Jewish" — such as ritual purification in mikvaot, ritual purification of vessels, specific burial customs, and avoidance of pork — appear to have been observed by the Idumaeans before they were by the Judeans. As a result, it is now occasionally suggested that, conversely, the Judeans may have adopted Idumaean customs. (3) Both a report by Josephus about the Qos-priest Costobarus and the discovery of a Herodian Qos sanctuary at Mamre suggest that the returning Idumaeans continued practicing their traditional religion nearly 100 years after their supposed conversion.

Contrary to Josephus' account, it is now more frequently suggested — based on the archaeological evidence — that many Idumaeans left their homeland for still unexplained reasons in the 2nd century BCE, that those who remained voluntarily entered into an alliance with the Judeans, and that both the remaining and returning Idumaeans continued practicing their traditional religion. The reports of forced conversions may have been either anti-Hasmonean propaganda Hasmonean propaganda, or more etiological than historical, intended to explain why the Idumaeans and Judeans shared similar customs.

According to the Books of the Maccabees and Josephus, the Maccabees did not advance into the central and southern Negev. Hence, archaeological excavations in these areas reveal that the Nabataean religion was practiced there without interruption until the beginning of the Islamic period in the 7th century. Nabatean political control of the Negev only ended when the Roman Empire annexed their lands in 106 CE.

== Byzantine and Early Islamic periods ==
=== Byzantine period: Regional history ===
In the 4th century, Byzantine rule introduced Christianity to the region. Combined with a stable political climate, this led to a significant population growth throughout the entire region. Immigrating Christians predominantly settled in the area of today's West Bank down to the Beersheba Valley, which had been most thoroughly extensively cleared of Judeans by the Romans. In the Beersheba Valley alone, the number of settlements surged from 47 in the Roman period (up to the 4th century) to 321 during the Byzantine era (4th - early 7th centuries); Beersheba expanded to an area of 90–140 ha, making it even larger than nearby Gaza and Anthedon, each covering about 90 ha.

=== Byzantine period: Agricultural history ===
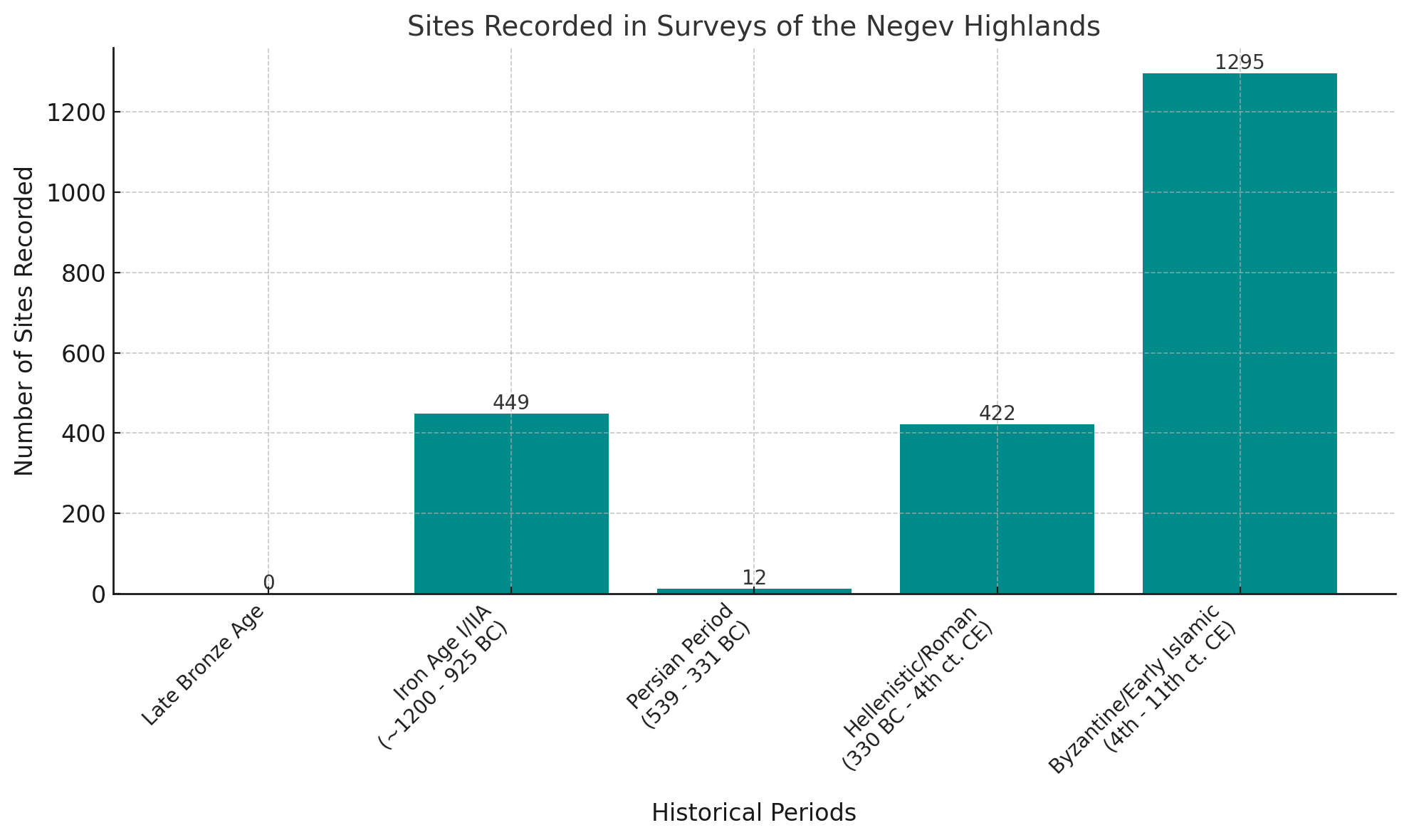
Registered sites in the Negev Highlands. Iron Age: Era of the copper miners. Persian Period: Copper miners relocate to Judaea. Hellenistic/Roman: Nabataeans migrate to the Negev Highlands. Byzantine/Early Islamic: Christian settlement wave and Arab expansion.

One of the three additional clusters of Christian settlements were the Nabatean desert towns. Most of these evolved into large agricultural villages with many smaller farms and villages around them. Ultimately, the whole central Negev, extending down roughly to the Ramon Crater, was dotted with hundreds of small agricultural villages and farms. These were likely operated by Nabataeans assimilated to the Byzantine Empire, after Nabatean trade had declined starting from late Roman times. On the character of Byzantine (and early Islamic) agriculture in the Negev, see below.

=== Early Islamic period: Regional history ===
From 602 to 628, the Byzantine military was severely depleted during the Byzantine-Sassanian War and regained control over Palestine only with great difficulty. After that, despite forming alliances with several Bedouin tribes, such as the Banu Amilah, the Banu Ghassan, the Banu Judham, and the Banu Lakhm, who were migrating from the Arabian Peninsula to the southern Negev during this period, the Arab forces encountered little resistance in their Islamic expansion into Palestine beginning in AD 634. By around AD 636, with the decisive Battle of the Yarmuk, the war was largely decided.

As mostly in the rest of the region of Palestine, the Islamic expansion left no archaeological trace in the Negev:

[...N]ot even one of the Negev towns was affected by the Islamic conquest. No hint of a violent invasion or destruction, or even a slight change in the material culture is found in the large-scale excavations of the sites. The archaeological findings point to an uninterrupted pattern of settlement which continued from the Byzantine period into the later stages of the early Islamic period.

— Gideon Avni, 2008

External image
- Nahal Oded: Mosque with pagan Matzevot.

There are also no clear signs of religious wars and forced conversions. In Nessana, it even appears that the same building was used simultaneously as both a church and a mosque. Similarly, in Nahal Oded (on the southwestern slope of the Ramon Crater), the same building seems to have served as a pagan cult place and a mosque at the same time. Related to this phenomenon is the fact that the early Palestinian Muslims even integrated the Christian festivals of Easter, Pentecost, Christmas, and Saint Barbara into the Muslim calendar. Therefore, on the eve of the Crusades, Palestine was still predominantly Christian. Hence, Ibn al-Arabi, who visited Palestine at the end of the 11th century, could still write: "The country is theirs [the Christians'] because it is they who work its soil, nurture its monasteries and maintain its churches."

=== Early Islamic period: Ruralization ===
The Arabic invasion, however, accelerated a trend toward deurbanization and ruralization, especially in the Negev, which had already started in Byzantine times, to which a number of factors contributed:

1. By the end of the Byzantine period, Christianity had become widespread in Palestine; however, within Christianity, the characteristic aspects of Roman-Byzantine urban culture were viewed as promoting unchristian frivolity. Consequently, urban institutions such as Roman baths and theaters began to be dismantled or destroyed from this time onward, reducing the appeal and hence the pull factors of cities.
2. Many monks, whose monasteries often served as the Christian centers of smaller towns (as in Avdat and Nessana), left Palestine after the Arab invasion, diminishing another pull factor of these towns.
3. A drought during the Late Antique Little Ice Age in the early sixth century, the Plague of Justinian that broke out in the densely populated cities of southern Palestine in the mid-sixth century, and a severe earthquake in the Negev toward the start of the early Islamic period drove urban populations to the countryside, where they now had to fend for themselves.
4. In Southern Palestine, a new economic sector emerged due to the strong international demand for "Gaza wine," which was primarily produced in Yavneh, Ashkelon, and Gaza. To capitalize on this, some inhabitants of the Negev towns took up viticulture in the countryside. Viticulture reached its peak between the 5th and early 7th centuries with the dramatic drop after 700. Even Arab writers of the Umayyad period praised the quality of Palestinian wine. After the wine trade collapsed, it seems that the vineyards were instead continued to be used for olive cultivation.
5. The Arab conquest and the Muslim imposition of two new taxes called Jizya and Kharaj on non-Muslims and non-Bedouins led to the cessation of the flow of Christian immigrants. The absence of Christian pilgrims also dried up financial flows, prompting even more Palestinians to turn back to subsistence farming.

Already in the Byzantine period, 90% of the settlements in the Negev were agricultural farms and villages. Following the decline of the towns during the early Islamic period, the total number of settlements gradually decreased, (Note: The exact figure is uncertain and controversial. For instance, Michael cites 101 sites in the Beersheba area as definitely inhabited during the Early Islamic period, compared to 47 in the Roman period and 321 during the Byzantine era. However, given that many settlements traditionally classified as "Byzantine" were also inhabited during the early Islamic period, she suggests that their number was "probably (much) higher than registered".) yet the proportion of agricultural villages among these settlements further increased. According to Rosen, this shift of life from cities to rural areas is the reason why most Byzantine churches are found in the desert towns, whereas most early mosques are found in rural areas. Also, further to the south, around the Ramon Crater at the southern fringes of the Negev highlands, the Negev Bedouin replicated the northern terrace architecture. Haiman estimates that during the early Islamic period, there would have been about 300 individual farming villages, each with 80–100 residents, cultivating a total of approximately 6,500 hectares of agricultural land (nearly 3% of the total area of the Negev Highlands). Newer surveys suggest that they might have cultivated even up to 30,000 – 50,000 hectares, which would correspond to nearly 14 – 23% of the area.

Meanwhile, the desert towns gradually died a quiet death: Elusa collapsed already towards the end of the Byzantine period, likely due to the Justinianic Plague and the Late Antique Little Ice Age. Mampsis was abandoned either by the 7th or 8th century, Rehovot by the 8th century. The abandonment of Avdat, seemingly due to an earthquake, is now also dated to the 8th century. The archaeologically poorly preserved Beersheba and its surroundings, including the revitalized towns Tel Masos, Tel Malhata and Tel Ira, may also have been abandoned by the 8th or 9th century. However, Shivta, Nessana, and the large Khirbet Futais (in the area of the former Philistine Nahal Patish) continued to exist at least until the 10th century. In Ayla, where the new inhabitants of the region resumed mining copper and started to mine gold, there can even be observed further growth; the towns were only abandoned in the 11th century.

From the 12th century onwards, as the Crusaders and then the Mamluks ravaged central and northern Palestine, most of the villagers and townspeople of the Negev had already migrated to these regions or to Europe. This, the war waged by the Crusaders against Southern Palestine as well, and the (not certain but likely) fact that the Mamluks prohibited permanent settlements in the Negev, led to the transformation of the Negev into a region inhabited solely by semi-nomadic and predominantly Muslim Bedouins.

=== Byzantine and Early Islamic desert agriculture ===
External image
- Reconstruction of a Byzantine/early Islamic agricultural system near Shivta.

If agriculture was already practiced on terraces during the Iron Age, this system was certainly further developed from the Byzantine period onwards:

- Starting in the Byzantine period, the Negevites stacked stone heaps, called Tuleilat el-Anab ("grape mounds"), to better facilitate the flow of rainwater into the wadis and probably also to reduce evaporation in the soil beneath these heaps for growing grape vines. (Note: Evenari strongly argued against the second purpose of the "grape mounds". However, Boyko discovered remnants of grapevines within the mounds, which seems to support this intended function as well.)
- They also constructed artificial dovecotes alongside the terraces, so that the pigeons could fertilize the agriculturally used soil with their droppings.
- Finally, the most sophisticated irrigation system originates from the early Islamic period: The inhabitants of the arid area around Yotvata in the southern Negev constructed tunnel systems known as "qanat," spanning several kilometers. These tunnels served as irrigation channels, directly connecting groundwater reservoirs to agricultural fields covering several hundred hectares. Uzi Avner writes that according to radiocarbon data, after the destruction of Ayla in the 11th century, "only small-scale cultivation was continued by Bedouins;" however, he does not specify how this "only small-scale" cultivation is identified. New research suggests instead that agriculture near Eilat was later expanded, as several excavated terraces are of a younger age: The oldest terrace dated post-11th century was constructed between the 14th and 16th centuries, with the next one built in the 16th century, followed by several more in the 17th and 18th centuries.

== The Negev region in the Hebrew Bible ==
The Bible contains several traditions regarding the Beersheba-Arad Valley and the Negev Highlands, which can be broadly categorized into two groups. From the first group, older biblical scholarship inferred that the Negev was inhabited by the ancient Israelites during biblical times. According to the second group, a different people lived here; this group aligns more with the findings of more recent archaeology.

(1) According to the Book of Genesis, already Abraham lived for a while in the central and biblical Negev after being banished from Egypt. Notably, he spent a brief period living in Kadesh [Barnea] and later resided as a guest in Beersheba, which at that time was purportedly part of the kingdom of the Philistine king of Gerar. (2) Accordingly, Numbers 34:1–7 and Joshua 15:1–3 are generally understood to mean that the biblical and central Negev actually belonged to God's Promised Land at least down to Kadesh Barnea at the southwestern fringes of the central Negev (but see below). This area is assigned to the Tribe of Judah along with other more northerly areas. Simultaneously, the biblical and central Negev is assigned elsewhere to the Tribe of Simeon within the territory of the tribe of Judah. (3) Hence, when the Israelites came from Egypt to Israel, according to Numbers 20:1–21:3, only Aaron is not allowed to enter this land because he has sinned — the rest of the Israelites, however, can conquer the area.

Ancient Israel according to the Bible (9th century BCE, approximate)

(4) Conversely, according to Deuteronomy 1–2, the area is revoked from the Israelites by God because everyone has sinned and God has also destined the land for the Edomites. (5) The background for this is found in Genesis 32:3; 33:12–16, where it is not Jacob, the ancestor of the Israelites, who lives there, but his brother Esau, the ancestor of the Edomites. These two grandsons of Abraham divide the promised land between them in Genesis 36:6–8 so that this "Edomite land" will continue to be inhabited by Edomites. (6) According to the Books of Kings, the Edomites also live here. They are sometimes ruled by Israelite kings, as the Negev was purportedly part of the kingdom of the legendary king Solomon (in its entirety, all the way to the Red Sea), and from the 9th century, with varied extension to the south, part of the Kingdom of Judah. But the Edomites fight against them multiple times and regain their freedom. (7) The most common expression used in the Bible to refer to Israel as a whole is "from Dan to Beersheba." Once again, this excludes at least the central and southern Negev regions from "Israel". (8) Accordingly, it is not at all certain whether the border descriptions in Numbers 34 and Joshua 15 really include the Negev as part of the promised land, as Numbers 34 also presupposes an area of Edom west of the Jordan (which, according to Numbers 20:14-16, begins at Kadesh as one of its southernmost locations). For that reason, it has recently occasionally been suggested that "Your southern border shall be from the Wilderness of Zin along the border of Edom" (Numbers 34:3) is to be understood as excluding the territory of the Edomites, and therefore at least the central and southern Negev, from the Promised Land. However, as of yet, this is still a minority opinion.
