= Desert farming =

Practice of developing agriculture in deserts

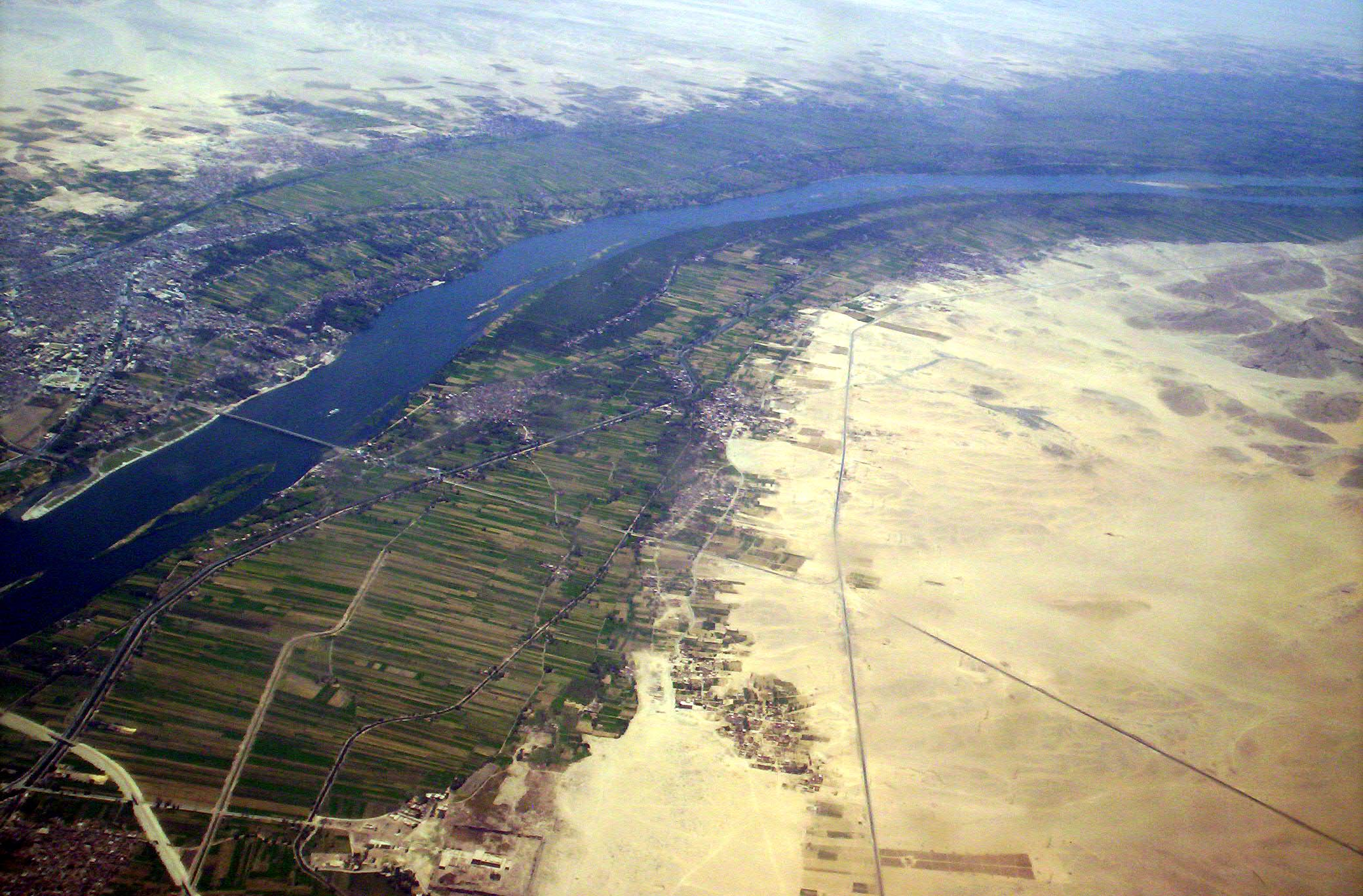
An aerial view of irrigation from the Nile, supporting agriculture in Luxor. Agriculture in Egypt has existed since 5500 BC.

Desert farming is the practice of developing agriculture in deserts. As agriculture depends upon irrigation and water supply, farming in arid regions where water is scarce is a challenge. However, desert farming has been practiced by humans for thousands of years. In the Negev, there is evidence to suggest agriculture as far back as 5000 BC. Today, the Imperial Valley in southern California, Australia, Saudi Arabia, and Israel are examples of modern desert agriculture. Water efficiency has been important to the growth of desert agriculture. Water reuse, desalination, and drip irrigation are all modern ways that regions and countries have expanded their agriculture despite being in an arid climate.

== History ==
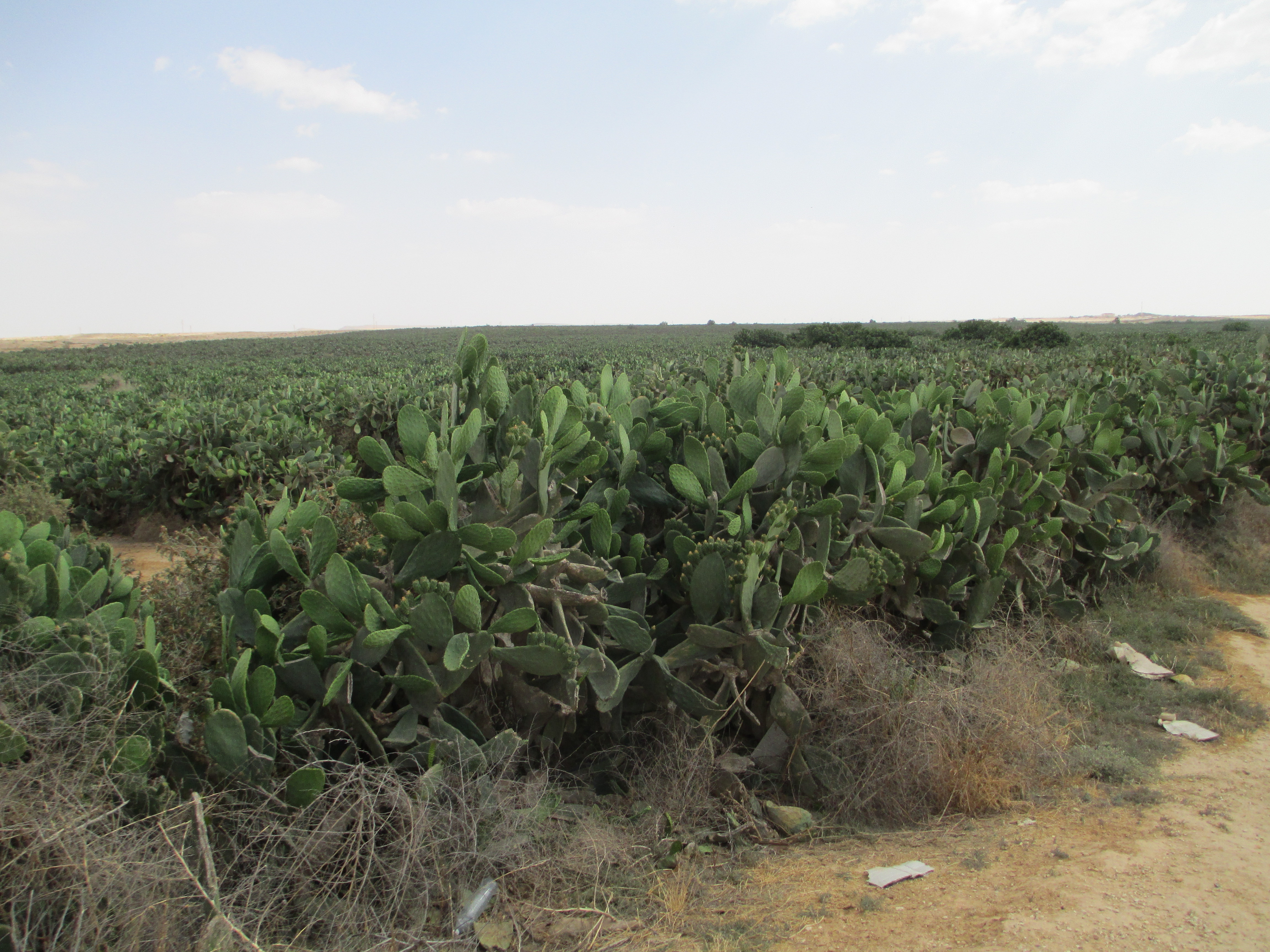
Prickly pear cactus is grown in arid conditions.

Humans have been practicing and refining agriculture for millennia. Many of the earliest civilizations such as ancient Assyria, Ancient Egypt, and the Indus Valley Civilization were founded in irrigated regions surrounded by desert. As these civilizations grew, the ability to rear crops in the desert became of increasing importance. There are also instances of civilizations that subsisted primarily in the desert with little irrigation or rainfall, such as various western American indigenous tribes.

=== Negev desert ===
Byzantine rule in the 4th century gave rise to agriculture-based cities in the Negev desert and the population grew exponentially, with water harvesting efforts and general prosperity reaching a peak in the 6th century under Justinian, after which a sharp decline followed. German-Israeli researcher Michael Evenari has shown how novel techniques were developed, such as runoff rainwater collection and management systems, which harvested water from larger areas and directed it onto smaller plots. This allowed the cultivation of plants with much higher water needs than the given arid environment could provide for. Other techniques included wadi terracing and flash-flood dams, and imaginative features used for collecting and directing runoff water. The Tuleilat el-Anab, Arabic for 'grape mounds', i.e. large pile of rocks dotting the desert, probably served two purposes: of removing the rocks from the cultivated plots, and of accelerating the erosion and water transportation of topsoil from the runoff collection area onto those plots.

A massive rise in grape production in the northwestern Negev for the needs of the wine industry was documented for the early 6th century, by studying ancient trash mounds at the settlements of Shivta, Elusa and Nessana. There is a sharp peak in the presence of grape pips and broken "Gaza jars" used to export local sweet wine and other Levantine goods from the port of Gaza, after a slower rise during the fourth and fifth centuries, and followed in the mid-6th century by a sudden fall. Two major calamities occurring in those days strike the empire and large parts of the world: the Late Antique Little Ice Age (536-545), caused by huge volcanic eruptions, resulting in the extreme weather events of 535–536; and the first outbreak of bubonic plague in the Old World, the Justinianic Plague of the 540s. These events likely resulted in almost a cessation of the international trade with luxury goods such as Gaza wine, grape production in the Negev settlements again giving way to subsistence farming, focused on barley and wheat. This seems to show that the wine industry of the semiarid region of the Negev could well be sustained over centuries through appropriate agricultural techniques, but that the grape monoculture was economically unsustainable in the long run.

=== Native Americans ===
The Native Americans practicing this agriculture included the ancient and no longer present Anasazi, the long-present Hopi, the Tewa people, Zuni people, and many other regional tribes, including the relatively recently arriving (about 1000 to 1400 CE) Navajo. These various tribes were characterized generally by the Spanish occupiers of the region as Sinagua Indians, sinagua meaning "without water", although this term is not applied to the modern Native Americans of the region.

Owing to the great dependence upon weather, an element considered to be beyond human control, substantial religious beliefs, rites, and prayer evolved around the growing of crops, and in particular the growing of the four principal corn types of the region, characterized by their colors: red, yellow, blue, and white. The presence of corn as a spiritual symbol can often be seen in the hands of the "Yeh" spirit figures represented in Navajo carpets, in the rituals associated with the "Corn Maiden" and other kachinas of the Hopi, and in various fetish objects of tribes of the region.

American Indians in the Sonoran Desert and elsewhere relied both on irrigation and "Ak-Chin" farming—a type of farming that depended on "washes" (the seasonal flood plains by winter snows and summer rains). The Ak-Chin people employed this natural form of irrigation by planting downslope from a wash, allowing floodwaters to slide over their crops.

In the Salt River Valley, now characterized by Maricopa County, Arizona, a vast canal system was created and maintained from about 600 AD to 1450 AD. Several hundred miles of canals fed crops of the area surrounding Phoenix, Tempe, Chandler and Mesa, Arizona. Unfortunately, the intense irrigation increased the salinity of the topsoil, making it no longer fit for the growing of crops. This seems to have contributed to the abandonment of the canals and the adoption of Ak-Chin farming.

The ancient canals served as a model for modern irrigation engineers, with the earliest "modern" historic canals being formed largely by cleaning out the Hohokam canals or being laid out over the top of ancient canals. The ancient ruins and canals of the Hohokam Indians were a source of pride to the early settlers who envisioned their new agricultural society rising as the mythical phoenix bird from the ashes of Hohokam society, hence the name Phoenix, Arizona. The system is especially impressive because it was built without the use of metal implements or the wheel. It took remarkable knowledge of geography and hydrology for ancient engineers to lay out the canals, but it also took remarkable socio-political organization to plan workforce deployment, including meeting the physical needs of laborers and their families as well as maintaining and administering the water resources.

== Contemporary desert farming ==
Desert agriculture is more important than ever before as global population rises. Countries and regions that are not water-secure are no exception to increasing population and thus increasing demand for food. The Middle East and North Africa is perhaps the largest example of growing nations with little to no water security or food security. By 2025, it is estimated that 1.8 billion people will live in countries or regions with absolute water scarcity.

=== Israel ===
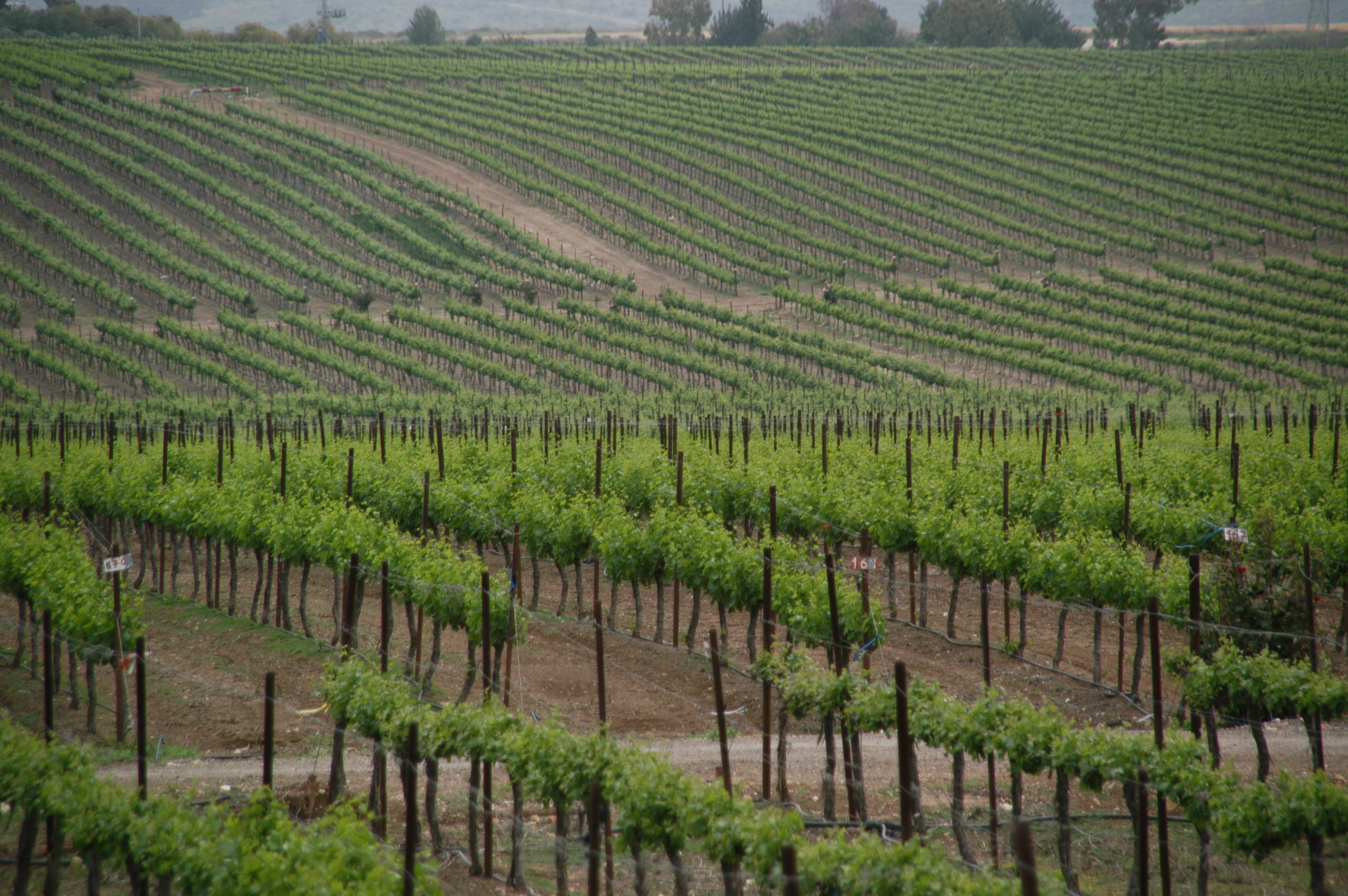
A farm in modern-day Israel utilizing drip irrigation.

Agriculture in modern-day Israel has pioneered several techniques for desert agriculture. The invention of drip irrigation by Simcha Blass has led to a large expansion of agriculture in arid regions, and in many places drip irrigation is the de facto irrigation technique utilized. Studies have consistently shown large water use reduction with drip irrigation or fertigation, with one study returning an 80% decrease in water use and 100% increase in crop yields. The same study (conducted on a sub-Saharan African village) found that this resulted in an improvement in the standard of living in the village by 80%.

Another hurdle for many water-scarce nations is consumption of water. Israel has chosen to take a focus on wastewater reuse to combat losing its water resources. The small desert nation reuses 86% of its wastewater as of 2011, and 40% of the total water used by agriculture was reclaimed wastewater. Desalination, brackish, or effluent water also accounts for 44% of Israel's water supply, and the world's largest seawater desalination plant is the Sorek Desalination Plant located in Tel Aviv. The plant is able to produce 624,000 m^{3} of water per day.

The agricultural output of Israel has increased sevenfold since the country's independence in 1948, and total farmland has increased from 165,000 hectares to 420,000 hectares. The country produces 70% of its own food (in dollar value).

=== Imperial Valley ===
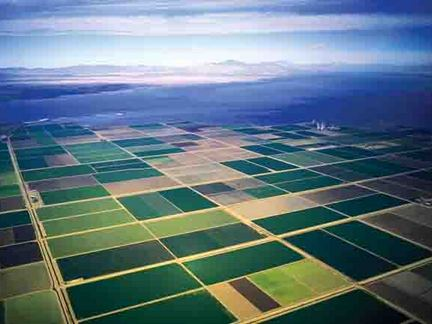
Fields in the Imperial Valley, California as seen from above.

The Imperial Valley is a valley in the Sonoran Desert that has been farmed for 90 years in southern California. Prior to the 20th century, the valley was unsettled except for a few small settlements in the 19th century. It is supplied with water via the All-American Canal, a canal from the Colorado River. It is estimated that around 2/3 of vegetables consumed in the winter in the United States originate from the Imperial Valley. Imperial County is responsible for the most lamb and sheep production in the country.

=== Australia ===
Adults over the age of 15 in Australia employed in agriculture, forestry, and fishing by percentage. Based on 2011 Australian Census Data.

Despite Australia being a vastly arid nation, agriculture has been a staple of the Australian economy since its founding. Australia produces cattle, wheat, milk, wool, barley, poultry, lamb, sugar cane, fruits, nuts, and vegetables. Agriculture provides 2.2% of Australia's total employment, and 47% of the total area in Australia is occupied by farms or stations.

== See also ==
- Agriculture in the prehistoric Southwest
- Desert greening
- Dryland farming
- Solar desalination
- Agriculture in Israel
- Agriculture in Australia
- Ancient Egyptian agriculture

== External links and further reading ==
- O'Bar, Scott, (2013). Alternative Crops for Drylands – Proactively Adapting to Climate Change and Water Shortages. Amaigabe Press, Santa Barbara, CA ISBN 978-0-9882822-0-9
- P. Koohafkan and B.A. Stewart, Water and Cereals in Drylands published by The Food and Agriculture Organization of the United Nations and Earthscan
  - Water and Cereals in Drylands
