= Gaza wine =

Byzantine-period wine from southern Palestine, shipped from Gaza

Gaza wine, (vinum Gazentum in Latin), probably identical with Ashkelon wine, was a much-appreciated sweet wine produced mainly during the Byzantine period in southern Palestine, with major production areas in the Negev Highlands and the southern coastal area including the area around Gaza and Ashkelon.

== History ==
The rise of Gaza wine as an export commodity has been attributed to two related phenomena. First, the growth of Christian monasticism in the region from the 4th century onward, and second, the growing flow of Christian pilgrims from the Latin west. The monk Hilarion of Tabatha (c. 300–371), established a monastic community near Gaza and drew large numbers of followers to the region, for whom viticulture became a principal occupation. According to scholar Philip Mayerson, Gaza served as a major staging point for western pilgrims traveling onward to Sinai and Egypt, and it is likely that exposure to the local wine during these stopovers generated demand for it upon their return to Spain, France, and Italy.

By the 5th and 6th centuries, Gaza wine had achieved the status of a literary topos, mentioned alongside celebrated Mediterranean vintages such as Falernian and Chian wine in the works of poets and chroniclers writing across the Latin west. A late 5th-century hagiographic source describing the Georgian monk Peter the Iberian's time near Gaza similarly attests to widespread viticulture in the area. According to this account, a local vineyard produced little wine of poor quality owing to the area's sandy soil, until the monk's blessing was said to have transformed it into an abundant producer.

In the early 6th century, grape production in the Negev specifically for Gaza wine experiences a major boom, due to the high demand for this product throughout Europe and the Middle East. This has been documented by studying ancient trash mounds at Shivta, Elusa and Nessana, which showed a sharp peak in the presence of grape pips and broken "Gaza jars" (a type of amphorae used in this period to export Levantine goods from the port of Gaza), following a slower rise during the fourth and fifth centuries. However, mid-century two major calamities strike the Byzantine Empire and large parts of the world: a short period of climate change known as the Late Antique Little Ice Age (536-545), caused by huge volcanic eruptions in faraway places, which lead to extreme weather events; and in the 540s the first outbreak of bubonic plague in the Old World, known as the Justinianic Plague. Probably as a result of these two events, international trade with luxury goods such as Gaza wine almost grounded to a halt, and in Shivta and other Negev settlements grape production again gave way to subsistence farming, focused on barley and wheat.

The previously widely accepted theory that the Muslim conquest, which came a century later, and the Muslim ban on alcoholic beverages were the cause for the decline of the wine industry in the Negev has recently been proven wrong. In Nessana, the number of grape pips is even on the rise again during the Early Islamic period, probably due to the needs of a local Christian monastery. This seems to indicate that the wine industry of the Negev could well be sustained over centuries through appropriate agricultural techniques and in spite of the arid climate, but that the grape monoculture was economically unsustainable in the long run.

In February 2015, several charred grape seeds used to make Gaza wine, estimated to be 1,500-years-old, were discovered in the Negev city of Halutza during a joint excavation by the University of Haifa and the Israel Antiquities Authority.

== See also ==
- Gaza jar, an associated type of amphora
- Israeli wine
- Michael Evenari, Negev ancient farming researcher
