= Shivta =

Archeological site in Israel

- שבטה (Hebrew) شبطا (Arabic)
- possibly Shubitu (Nabataean), Sobota (ancient Greek), Subeita and Isbeita (Arabic).
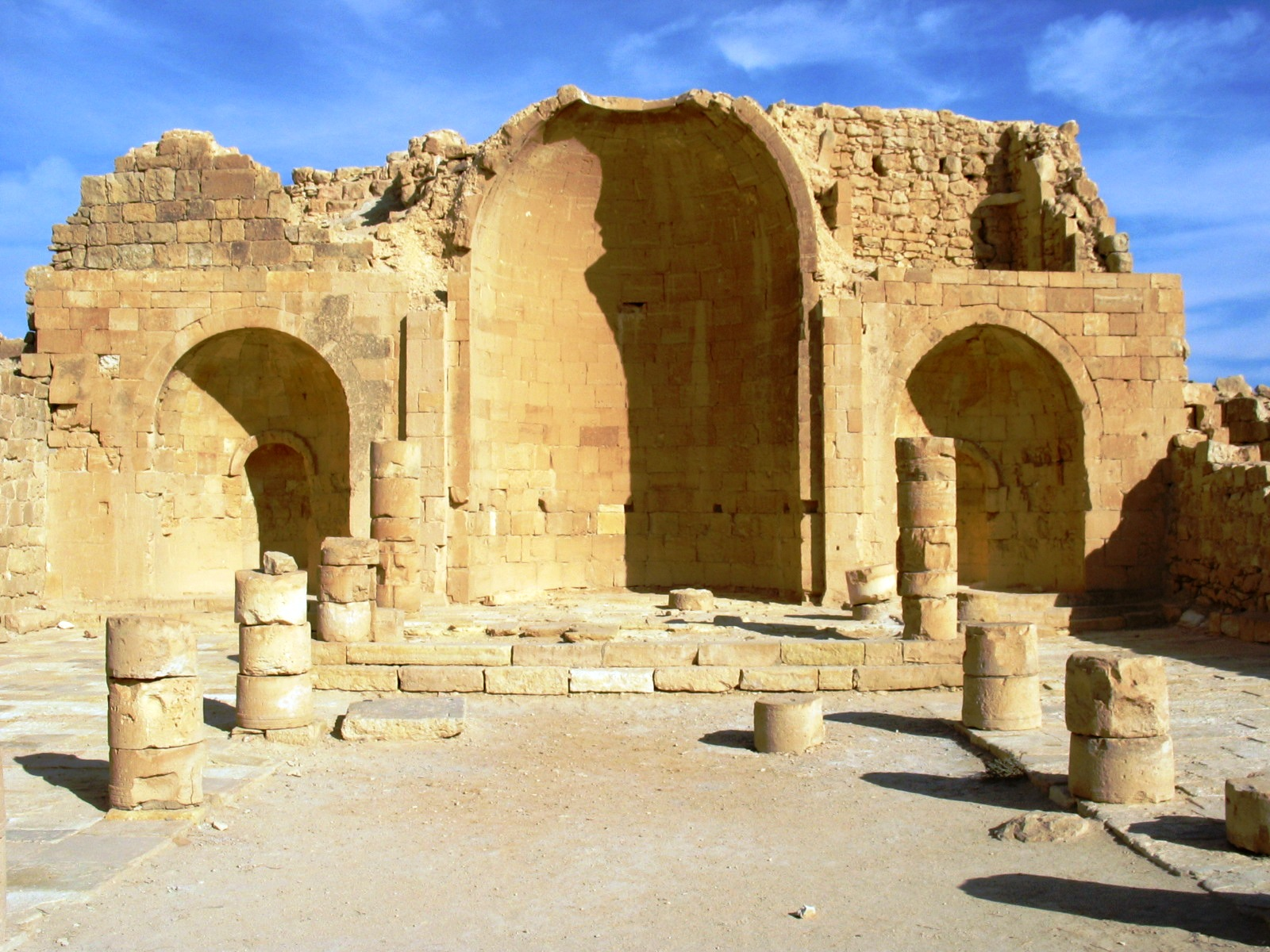
- Shivta's southern church

- Location within Israel
- 30.88°N 34.63°E
- Type: Settlement
- Cultures: Nabataean, Byzantine
- Location: Southern District, Israel
- Region: Negev

History
- Abandoned: 8th/9th century

Site notes
- Excavation dates: 1933-1934
- Condition: In ruins

UNESCO World Heritage Site
- Official name: Incense Route - Desert Cities in the Negev (Haluza, Mamshit, Avdat and Shivta)
- Type: Cultural
- Criteria: iii, v
- Designated: 2005 (29th session)
- Reference no.: 1107
- Region: Europe and North America

Shivta (Hebrew: שבטה), originally Sobata (Greek: Σόβατα) or Subeita (Arabic: شبطا), is an ancient city in the Negev Desert of Israel located 43 kilometers southwest of Beersheba. Shivta was declared a UNESCO World Heritage Site in June 2005, as part of the Incense Route and the Desert Cities of the Negev, together with Haluza/Elusa, Avdat and Mamshit/Mampsis.

The name Shivta is a modern Hebraization, given by the Negev Naming Committee in the early 1950s. The Greek name Sobata was mentioned in the Nessana papyri.

== History ==
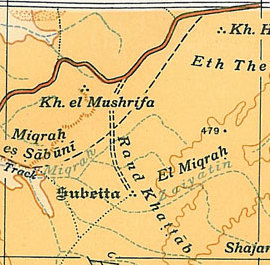
Subeita shown in the 1944 Survey of Palestine map

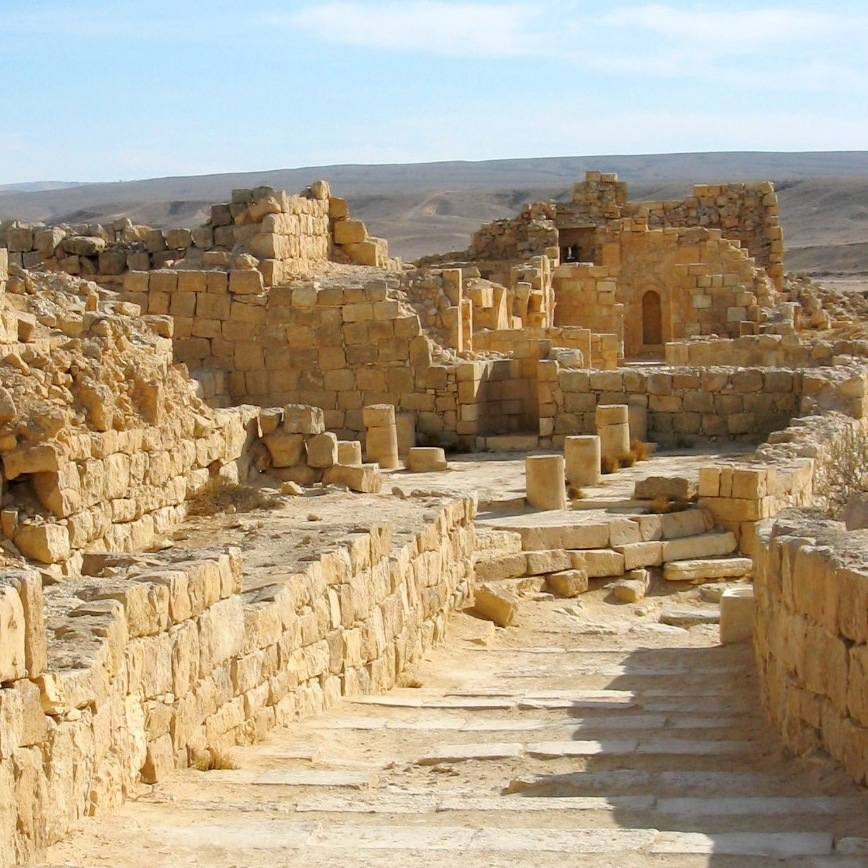
Shivta ruins

Long considered a classical Nabataean town on the ancient spice route, archaeologists are now considering the possibility that Shivta was a Byzantine agricultural colony and a way station for pilgrims en route to the Saint Catherine's Monastery in the Sinai Peninsula.

A few Roman-period ruins have been discovered, but most of the archaeological findings date to the Byzantine period. Shivta's water supply was based on surface runoff collected in large reservoirs.

=== Roman period ===
Roman ruins from the first century BCE have been unearthed in the southern part of the town.

=== Byzantine period ===
Three Byzantine churches (a main church and two smaller ones), two wine-presses, residential areas and administrative buildings have been excavated.

==== Churches ====
Traces of a mural of Christ's transfiguration were discovered in the apse of the southern church, as well as remains of a colourful 6th-century mosaic and a beardless depiction of Jesus in the northern church.

==== Agriculture (wine) ====
The wine presses at Shivta give an insight into the scale of wine production at the time. According to the calculations of archaeologists, the Nabatean/Byzantine village of Shivta produced about two million liters of wine.

Adjacent to the site is a large farm that uses Nabatean agricultural techniques of irrigation, sowing and reaping.

In the early 6th century, grape production in the Negev for the so-called vinum Gazentum ('Gaza wine' in Latin) experienced a major boom due to the high demand for this product throughout Europe and the Middle East. This has been documented by studying ancient trash mounds at Shivta, Elusa, and Nessana, which showed a sharp peak in the presence of grape pips and broken "Gaza jars" (a type of amphorae used in this period to export Levantine goods from the port of Gaza), following a slower rise during the fourth and fifth centuries. However, mid-century two major calamities struck the Byzantine Empire and large parts of the world: a short period of climate change known as the Late Antique Little Ice Age (536-545), caused by huge volcanic eruptions in faraway places, which lead to extreme weather events; and in the 540s the first outbreak of bubonic plague in the Old World, known as the Justinianic Plague. Probably as a result of these two events, international trade with luxury goods such as Gaza wine almost grounded to a halt, and in Shivta and other Negev settlements grape production again gave way to subsistence farming, focused on barley and wheat. The previously widely accepted theory that the Muslim conquest, which came a century later, and the Muslim ban on alcoholic beverages were the cause for the decline of the wine industry in the Negev has been now proven wrong. In nearby Nessana, the number of grape pips is even on the rise again during the Early Islamic period, probably due to the needs of a local Christian monastery. This seems to indicate that the wine industry of the Negev could well be sustained over centuries through appropriate agricultural techniques and in spite of the arid climate, but that the grape monoculture was economically unsustainable in the long run.

=== Early Muslim period ===
After the Arab conquest in the 7th century CE, the population dwindled. Shivta was finally abandoned in the 8th or 9th century CE.

== The Armenian graffito from the Southern Church of Shivta ==
The Armenian graffito from the Southern Church of Shivta is a significant archaeological find. It has been dated it to the 9th-11th centuries, to a time after the site had already been abandoned. The date is based on paleographic analysis, as well as the location of the graffito. It is located in the apse, at a height of 2.8 meters from the church floor, and consists of only two uncial letters: Բ (B) and Ա (A), 17 cm high and together 24 cm wide.

== Excavation history ==
Ulrich Jasper Seetzen was the first Westerner to visit the site when he arrived in 1805, but he misidentified it as Abde (Avdat). Edward Henry Palmer came in 1870 and the following year he published the first official description, while Alois Musil's 1901 visit resulted in the publication of the first photos of the ruins. A team from the École Biblique in Jerusalem including famed researchers Antonin Jaussen, Raphaël Savignac and Louis-Hugues Vincent studied a few aspects of the site in 1904, Theodor Kühtreiber added a few observations in 1912. The first scientific study covering agricultural and social aspects came as a result of a survey by C. L. Woolley and T. E. Lawrence (the future "Lawrence of Arabia"), taken on behalf of the Palestine Exploration Fund (PEF) in 1914. During the Great War, a German team of researchers (Theodor Wiegand, Carl Watzinger and Walter Bachmann), part of the Deutsch-Türkisches Denkmalschutzkommando ("German-Turkish Command for Cultural Heritage Protection"), studied the site in 1916. The École Biblique returned in 1926 with a team under Raphaël Tonneau, and in 1929 with Alexis Mallon.

In 1933–38, American archaeologist Harris Dunscombe Colt conducted a dig at Shivta. The house he lived in bears an inscription in ancient Greek that reads: "With good luck. Colt built (this house) with his own money." Colt never published the result of his excavations, which also represent the only large-scale archaeological campaigns executed at the site. Much of the archaeological information is lost for good, not least due to a fire on 7 October 1938 at the expedition house that consumed all the collected architectural decoration and dig notes.

Updates from 2018:

In January 1938, a suitcase, which contained artifacts, documents, and photographs from the archaeological excavations at Shivta, was forgotten at the Haifa port. The suitcase belonged to Harris Dunscombe Colt (1901—1973), the excavator of Shivta. Colt never came to claim the forgotten suitcase, nor was it ever sent to him. The suitcase was eventually shipped to Jerusalem and its contents were never studied or published.
The artifacts, which consist of small items like jewelry, door hinges, nails, pieces of glass, objects made from bone, ivory and wood, and shards of pottery inscribed with Arabic and Greek writing, are now on display at the Hecht Museum at the University of Haifa.

In the late 1940s, Bellarmino Bagatti continued work at the northern church, and in the 1950s Nelson Glueck researched Shivta's ecology. Between 1958-1960, Michael Avi-Yonah and made the site accessible, in the process also clearing the central church of debris.

In the 1960s, botanist Michael Evenari studied the economy of Shivta and water collection in its arid environment, his methods of experimental archaeology offering important insights into subsistence farming in the Negev desert and agricultural projects.

Between 1970-1976, Avraham Negev led various surveys, others following with a number of small digs, theoretical studies and mapping efforts. A 2000-2001 in-depth study of Shivta's water systems, based on surveys and analysis, was the work of Tsvika Tsuk.

Today

Reconstruction of Nabatean Farms.

In the late 1950s the Desert Runoff Farms Unit, now a joint project of The Hebrew University of Jerusalem and Ben-Gurion University of the Negev, reconstructed two Nabatean farms, one at Shivta and the other at Avdat

== See also ==
- Archaeology of Israel
- Tourism in Israel

== Bibliography ==
- Tepper, Yotam; Bar-Oz, Guy (4 May 2016). "Shivta Preliminary Report" (128). Hadashot Arkheologiyot – Excavations and Surveys in Israel.
- Erickson-Gini, Tali (16 December 2013). "Shivta Final Report" (125). Hadashot Arkheologiyot – Excavations and Surveys in Israel.
- Nash, G.H., 2019. One of the magnificent six: Secrets for the Byzantine city of Shivta. Current World Archaeology 96, 46-49.
- Röhl, Constanze (2010). "Shivta, Architektur und Gesellschaft einer byzantinischen Siedlung im Negev (PhD thesis); "Shivta, Architecture and Society of a Byzantine settlement in the Negev"" (in German). Cologne, Germany: University of Cologne.
