= Gaza Jar =

Artifact from Gaza

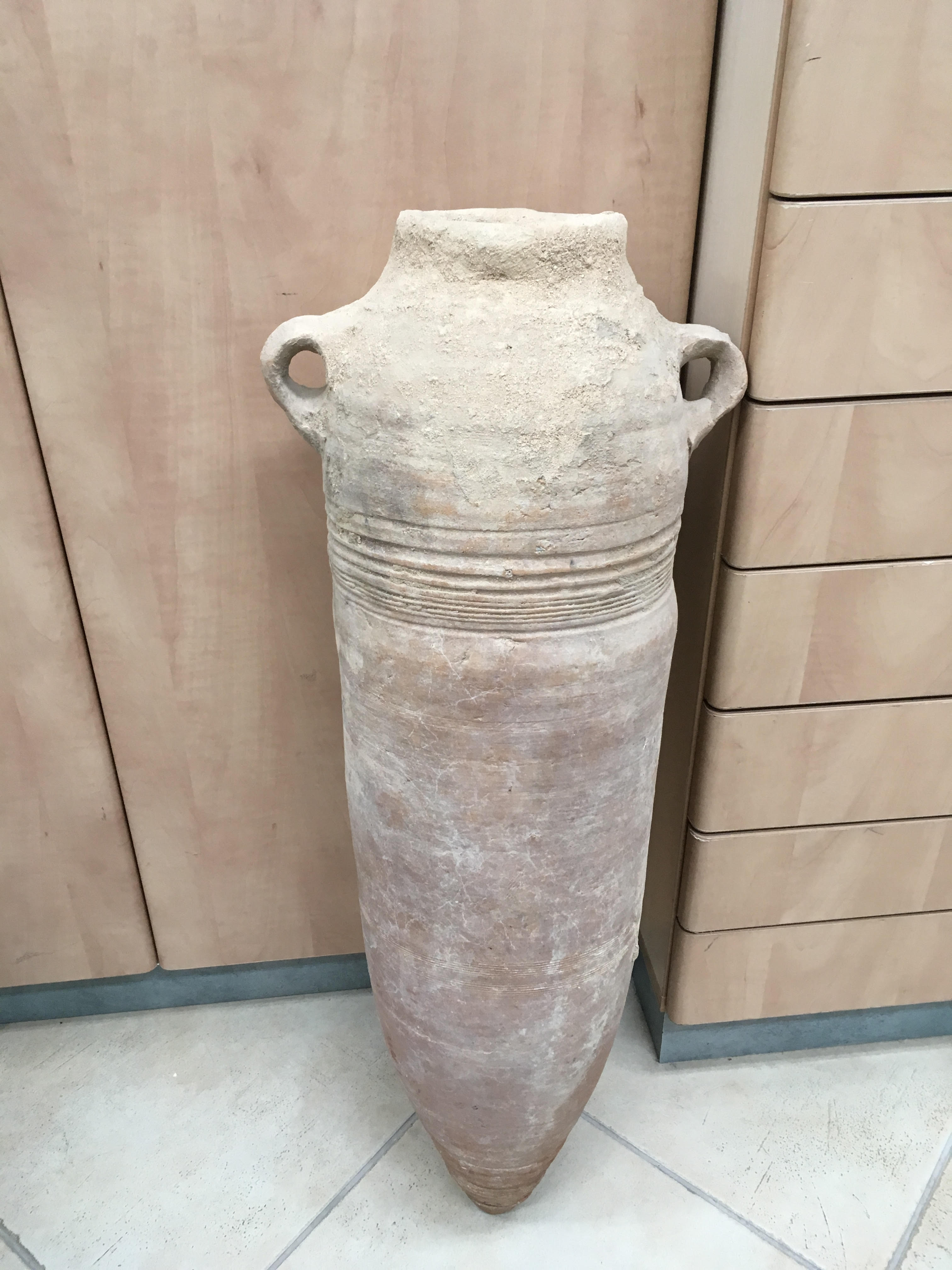
Gaza Jar, from the Collection of the Department of Archeology, University of Haifa. The picture shows a type 4.

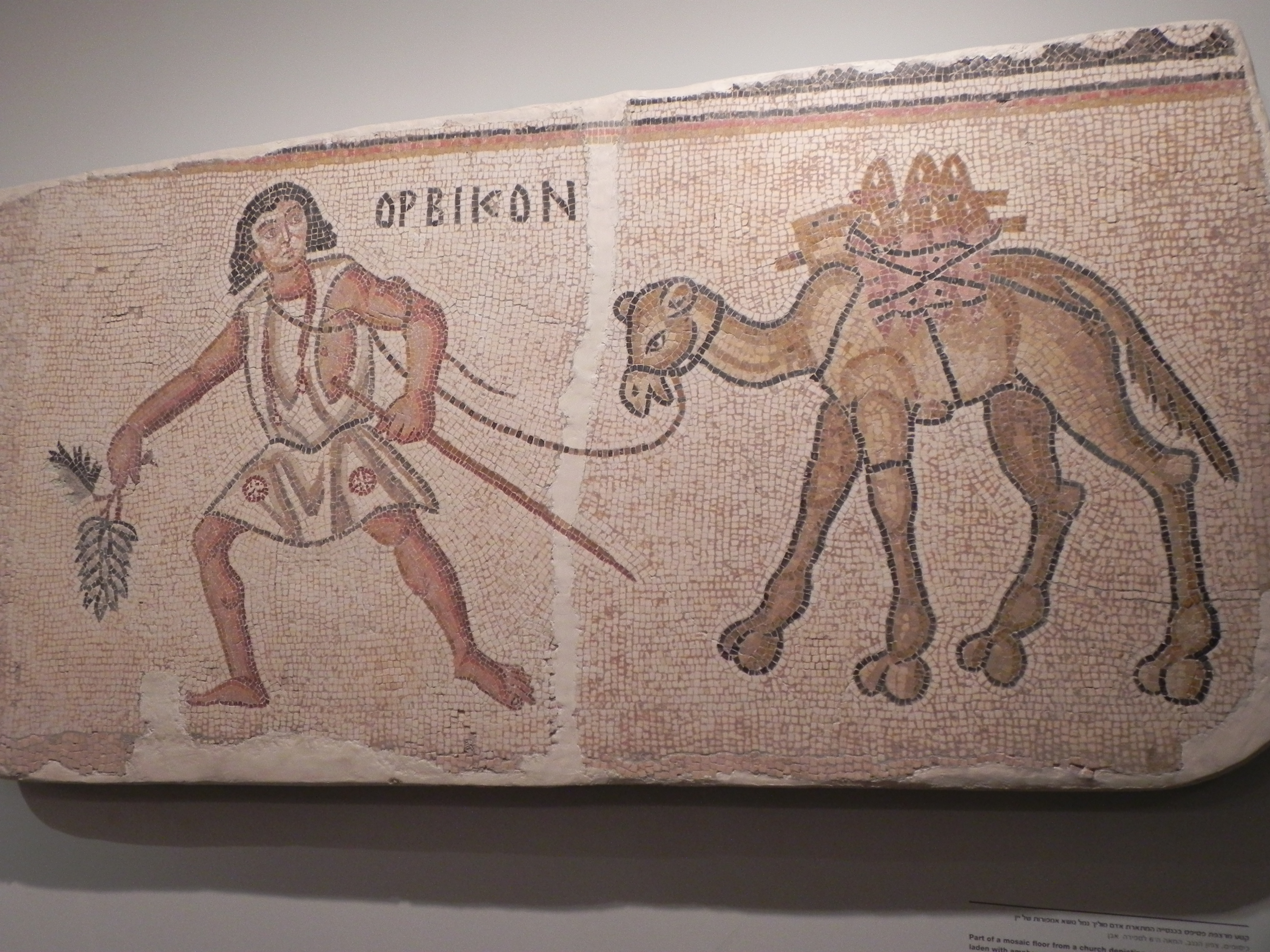
Camel carrying Gaza Jars. Byzantine mosaic from church near Kissufim, northwest Negev (Israel Museum)

The Gaza Jar (gazition in Greek) was a type of storage vessel used from the Roman period to the end of the Byzantine period and the beginning of the early Muslim period in the Holy Land. Gaza was a regional trading hub at this time. The jar was made on a potter's wheel and is believed to have been used to store vinum Gazetum, Latin for Gaza wine, a sweet wine greatly prized in Roman times which reached peak production in the early 6th century.

Gaza Jars are divided into four types. Type 2 may be identical to the Ashkelon Jar (askalônion).

== Typical jars ==
There is a typological division of the jars. During the existence of the Gaza jar – from the 1st century to the 7th century, four main forms were identified by archaeologists (according to the typology of G. Majcherek). (Note: Majcherek, Grzegorz (1995). "Gazan amphorae: Typology reconsidered". Hellenistic and Roman Pottery in the Eastern Mediterranean: Advances in Scientific Studies, Acts of the Second Workshop at Nieborow. pp. 166–178.)

All types are "Gaza Jars", but there are differences in the shape of the vessel's rim, body shape, base, and volume. All types have two handles. They are not manufactured at the same production sites, and differences in the shape of the jar can be discerned along the timeline.

Types 3 and 4 are the most common in pottery assemblages from archeological sites from the Byzantine period. The narrow and conical shape indicates their use as a marine transport jar. The boats and ships had special devices, into which the pointy bases of the jars (amphorae) were stuck in order to prevent displacement and breakage during the voyage.

=== Type 1 ===
Common from the 1st to the 3rd century. Contains about 30 liters and has a rounded body.

=== Type 2 ===
Common from the beginning of the 4th century to the middle of the 5th century. Has a cylindrical body (some researchers attribute this type to the "Ashkelon Jar").

=== Type 3 ===
Common from the 5th to the 6th century. Has a narrow body with a rounded base.

=== Type 4 ===
Common in the 7th century. Has a narrow "conical" body with a narrow and pointed base.

== Use ==
=== Primary use ===
==== Wine ====
Vinum Gazentum, Latin for 'Gaza wine', also known as Ashkelon wine: The main use of the jars was probably wine produced in the southern lowlands, the southern coastal plain and the northern Negev. In the past, people tended to think that the wine came from the Gaza or Ashkelon area only because of the mention of the names Gaza and Ashkelon in ancient sources of travelers and pilgrims from the Byzantine Empire, along with the discovery of Gaza jars from the Galilee in Ashkelon excavations. In the 20th century, it can be concluded that wine production came from a wider area in the Land of Israel.

In the 5th century, the Gaza Jar became the main jar in the Mediterranean trade. It is common in many sites in the Mediterranean basin that were under Byzantine rule. The presence of the jars at coastal sites on the shelves of continents, Europe and Africa indicates the nature of their transport, in maritime trade by boats.

Archaeological evidence for the importance of the wine industry in the south of the country can be seen in the number of wineries and oil presses excavated in the southern coastal plain area. In the Byzantine period, there was high-intensity human activity in Negev. The location of the city of Gaza on the southern coastal plain and its connection with many trade routes contributed to its importance in the economy of the Mediterranean Basin. During the middle of the 4th century, jars full of wine from Gaza and Ashkelon arrived in Egypt. The "Gaza Jars" wine brand seems to have been a favorite of Egyptian residents during this period, given the fact that it was a local wine producer in Egypt from ancient times. (Note: Sperber, Daniel, Objects of trade between Palestine and Egypt in Roman times, Journal of the Economic and Social History of the Orient, 1976, pp. 141–144)

==== Olive oil ====
Excavations at the archeological site located in Ashkelon, excavated by archaeologists Yigal Israel and Tali Erickson-Gini and dating to the Roman-Byzantine periods, uncovered Gaza Jar kilns next to wine- and oil-presses. The excavators stated that the jars were used for the storage and export of the oil and wine produced at the site.

==== Resin coating ====
Chemical tests conducted by the archaeologists on the basis of the jars, revealed that some of them contained black organic matter, which originated in coniferous resin. Only jars that were used to store wine appear to have been coated with resin, in primary use.

=== Secondary use ===
The jar appears to have been a by-product of local production on the southern coastal plain. Once the contents were consumed, the jar was used for storage, heating, (Note: Erickson-Gini, Tali (2010). "Nabataean settlement and self-organized economy in the Central Negev: crisis and renewal". Archaeopress, p. 220.) transport and even as a habitat for animals.

==== Storage ====
There is evidence that fish bones were found inside the conical-type Gaza Jars, apparently, there was a fish axis or canned fish inside.

==== Animal-raising ====
There are cases of secondary use of animal-raising jars, such as pigeon nests or as a tool intended for spawning fish. The jar was also used to store olive oil, sesame oil, wheat, pistachios, beans, sweets and cheese. This information is based on research conducted by the researcher Philip Mayerson in ancient sources such as papyrus from the Byzantine period in which the jars of Gaza or Ashkelon are mentioned for their contents.

==== Fireplace ====
Use as fireplace or tabun oven: Between 1993 and 1994, excavations were carried out by Tali Erickson-Gini on behalf of the Israel Antiquities Authority (IAA) in the Nabataean city of Mamshit (Mampsis) in the Negev. The ceramic complex of the site contained pottery for cooking and storage as well as Gaza Jars. But beyond the presence of the jars in the daily ceramic complex, heating devices that were made from bases of type 2 Gaza jars were excavated. In one of the rooms, about two bases of Gaza Jars with soot on them were found on site. The structure ceased to exist after the earthquake that occurred on 19 May 363, and generally operated, as stated by Dr. Erickson-Gini, "from the end of the 3rd century". (Note: Erickson-Gini (2010), p. 85.)

== Distribution ==
=== Israel ===
Over the years, a number of archeological excavations have been conducted in the southern coastal plain of Israel, such as the excavation in Ashkelon and other excavations. In many of the sites, kilns were discovered to create the pottery, which proves the existence of workshops producing the jars. The proliferation of houses in the vicinity of agricultural facilities for wine production proves that the phenomenon of pottery production relied on the production of partial production and was in fact created as a "by-product" industry – first the wine was created and as a result, the jar was created.

Yigal Israel's research from the early 1990s illuminated the map of the distribution sites of Gaza Jars. A survey was conducted in Israel by the IAA, covering some 20 settlement sites from the Byzantine period. At some sites, kilns were seen on the surface and stones. All the sites are located near streams or wadis near the raw material used to build the tools – clay. However, the southern coastal plain and northern Negev region are not the absolute boundaries of the houses of the creator. In light of several studies, houses of art were discovered in the vicinity of the city of Yavne. (Note: Yisrael, Yigal. "סקר בתי יוצר, נחל לכיש-נחל בשור" (lit. "A survey of pottery workshops (?), Nahal Lachish-Nahal Besor"), Hadashot Arkheologiyot, 1993, pp. 91-93 (in Hebrew).) (Note: Yuval Gadot and Yotam Tepper. "A late Byzantine pottery workshop at Khirbet Baraqa", Tel Aviv 30.1, 2003, pp. 143–148. doi:10.1179/tav.2003.2003.1.130)

A large number of pottery fragments of Gaza Jars from the 5th and 6th centuries were found in an organized archeological excavation near the Karni crossing. (Note: שרידים המשקפים את כלכלת חקלאי חבל עזה-אשקלון בחפירות הרשות - סובב עזה (lit. "Remains that reflect the agricultural economy of the Gaza-Ashkelon region in the Palestinian Authority excavations - Sovev [area around?] Gaza", 2 March 2006, IAA website (in Hebrew).)

=== Wider Mediterranean and Europe ===
Gaza Jars are found in many assemblies at sites in the Mediterranean basin including more western countries such as France, Spain, Italy, England and Germany. Types are known from Istanbul, Turkey, Berenice (ancient city in the Cyrenaica region from the Roman-Byzantine periods at Benghazi in Libya), Carthage in Tunisia, and Alexandria in Egypt. (Note: Oren, Eliezer D. "אוסתרקינה (אל-פלוסיאת)". Hadashot Arkheologiyot (1977), pp. 72-75 (in Hebrew))
