= Elusa (Haluza) =

Archaeological site in Israel

Haluza
- חלוצה (Hebrew) الخلصة (Arabic)
- Halasa; Chellous al-Khalasa; Elusa
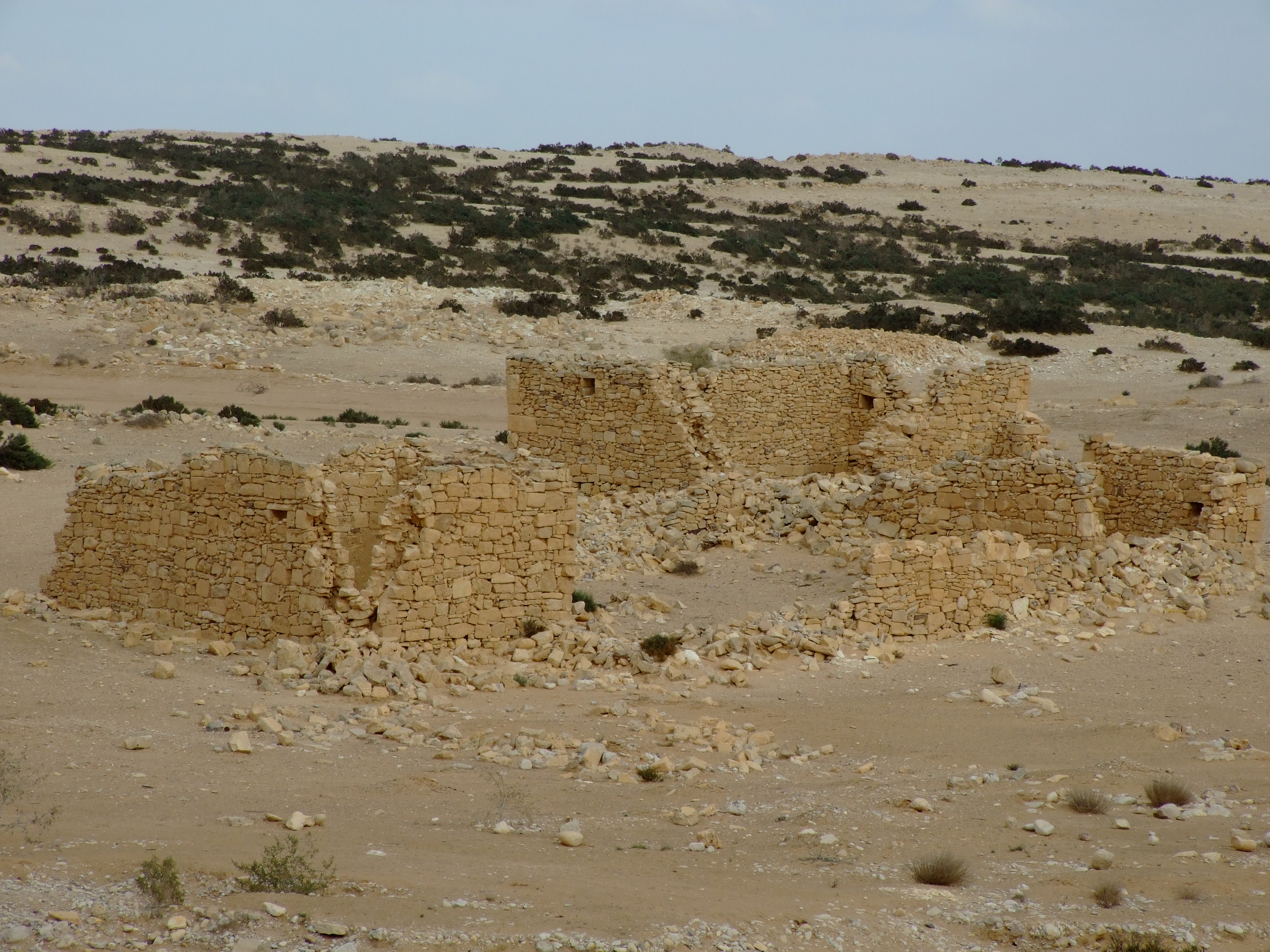

- Location within Israel
- 31.097°N 34.652°E
- Type: Settlement
- Cultures: Nabataean, Roman
- Location: Southern District, Israel
- Region: Negev

Site notes
- Condition: In ruins

UNESCO World Heritage Site
- Official name: Incense Route - Desert Cities in the Negev (Haluza, Mamshit, Avdat and Shivta)
- Type: Cultural
- Criteria: iii, v
- Designated: 2005 (29th session)
- Reference no.: 1107
- Region: Europe and North America

The ancient city of Halasa, Elusa (Ἐλοῦσα) in the Byzantine period, was a city in the Negev near present-day Kibbutz Mash'abei Sadeh that was once part of the Nabataean Incense Route. It lay on the route from Petra to Gaza. Today it is known as Haluza (Hebrew: חלוצה), and during periods of Muslim habitation it was known as al-Khalūṣ (Arabic: الخلوص; Early Muslim period) and Al-Khalasa (الخلصة; 20th century).

In the 5th century it was surrounded by vineyards and was famous for its wines.

Due to its historic importance, UNESCO declared Haluza a World Heritage Site along with Mamshit, Avdat and Shivta.

== Name in ancient sources ==
It is mentioned in the 2nd century CE by Ptolemy, Peutinger's Table, Stephanus Byzantius (fl. 6th century; as being formerly in the province of Arabia Petraea, but "now" in Palaestina Tertia), Jerome (c. 342–47 – 420), the pilgrim Theodosius (early 6th century), the anonymous pilgrim of Piacenza (around 570), and Joannes Moschus (c. 550 – 619). On the 6th-century Madaba Map the town appears as ΕΛΟΥϹΑ, "Elusa".

In Saadia Gaon's 10th-century Judeo-Arabic translation of the Pentateuch, the biblical town of Gerar is associated with Haluza, whom he calls al-Khalūṣ (Judeo-Arabic: 'אלכ'לוץ).

== History ==
=== Nabataean period ===
The ancient site was founded by the Nabateans, probably in the late 4th or early 3rd century BCE. Roman historian Ptolemy (d. c. 150 CE) identifies Elusa as a town in Idumea west of the Jordan River.

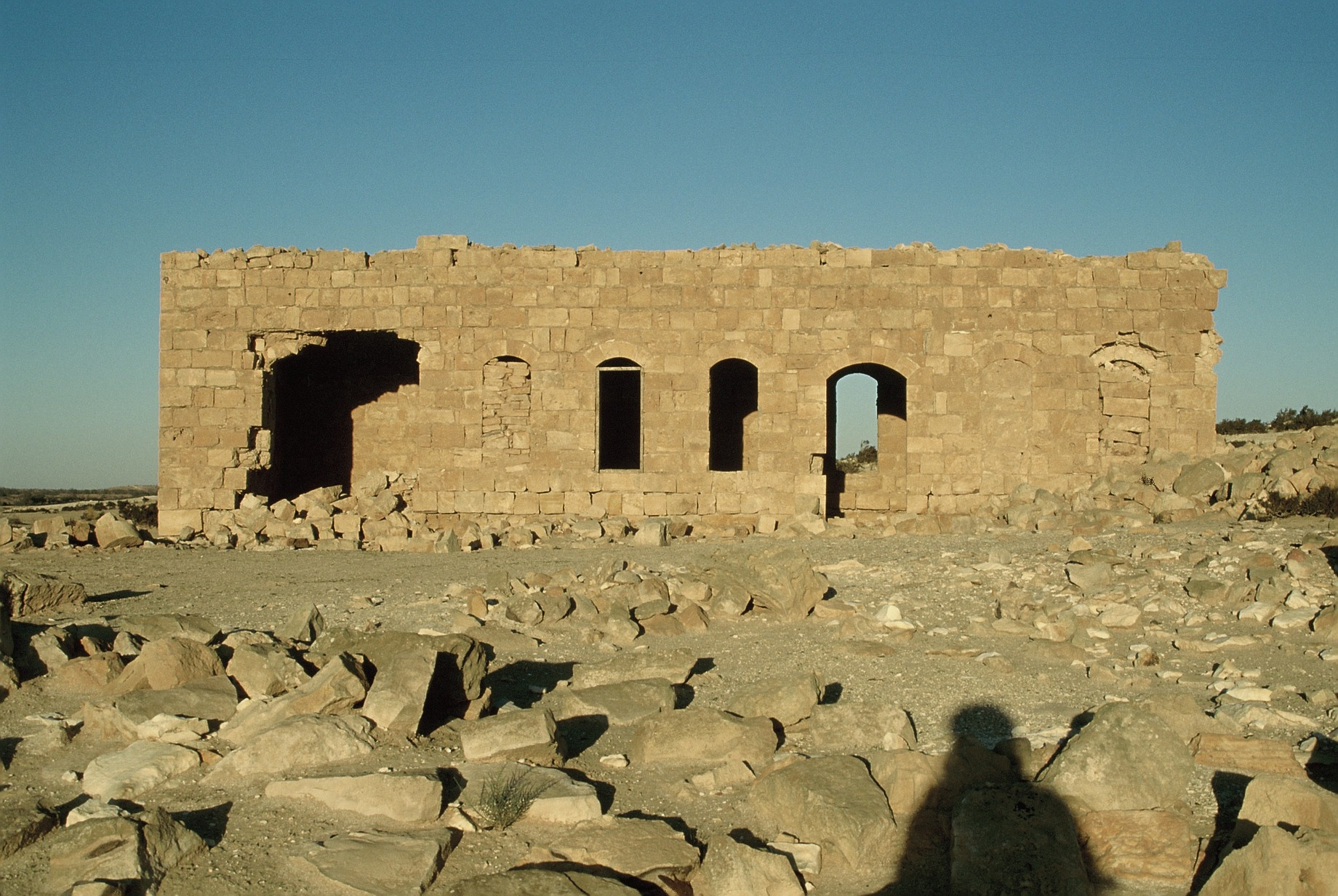
One of the last buildings left in Halusa.

=== Late Roman and Byzantine periods ===
After the Roman annexation of Nabataea in 106 CE, Elusa grew to become the principal city of the central Negev, at the time part of the western Arabia Petraea province.

Elusa became one of the first Negev towns to have a large Christian population, and Christians and pagans lived side by side. While the bishops of Elusa participated in the church councils 431 and 451 CE, tombstones found in the local cemetery indicate that there were pagans living in Elusa as late as the early 5th century, when the city belonged to Palaestina Tertia. It was the birthplace of Zenobius, a prominent 4th-century rhetorician in Antioch and a teacher of the influential pagan sophist, Libanius. Jerome mentions in his life of St. Hilarion a great temple of Aphrodite in 4th-century Elusa. Hilarion is supposed to have introduced Christianity to Elusa in the fourth century.

Early in the fifth century, a bishop of Elusa, after redeeming the son of Nilus of Sinai, who had been carried off from Mount Sinai by the Arabs, ordained both him and his father. Other bishops known are Theodulus, 431; Aretas, 451; Peter, 518; and Zenobius, 536. The bishopric of Elusa still is included in the Catholic Church's list of titular sees.

=== Early Muslim period ===
The Nessana papyri, dating to the 6th and 7th centuries, are showing that after the Muslim conquest of Palestine, the polis retained its prominence as an administrative center during the Early Muslim period at least until the late 7th century - this in spite of the fact that none of the findings made by archaeologists up until the 1997 campaign could be firmly dated to this period. The Nessana papyri are showing that after the Arab conquest, the name of the city took the Arabic form of al-Khalus. Eventually the town declined and the place was abandoned for centuries, becoming a place where mainly Gazans came to loot the ruins of construction stones, an activity which continued into the 20th century (Mandate Palestine).

=== Western rediscovery, Bedouin resettlement ===
In 1838, Edward Robinson identified Al-Khalasa as the old Elusa based on its Arabic name. In 1905, the Ecole Biblique of Jerusalem studied remains and discovered the cemetery of Elusa, and in 1914 C.L. Woolley and T. E. Lawrence (the soon-to-be "Lawrence of Arabia"), during their survey of the Negev, made an attempt of drawing a site plan, but could distinguish little more than traces of a wall and two gates.

The constant interest of Western archaeologists in the remains of Elusa, encouraged the al-Azizma Bedouin tribe of the Negev to resettle the site. They built their small village, which they called Al-Khalasa, among the ancient ruins and next to the wells, between two wadis, with houses constructed of mud and stone. An elementary school was established in the village in 1941, and there were several shops. Most of the inhabitants earned their living through animal husbandry and commerce, and used a well for drinking water. Al-Khalasa was taken during the 1948 Arab-Israeli War by the IDF in October 1948.

Excavations revealed traces of Late Ottoman infant jar-burials commonly associated with nomads or itinerant workers of Egyptian origins.

== Archaeology ==
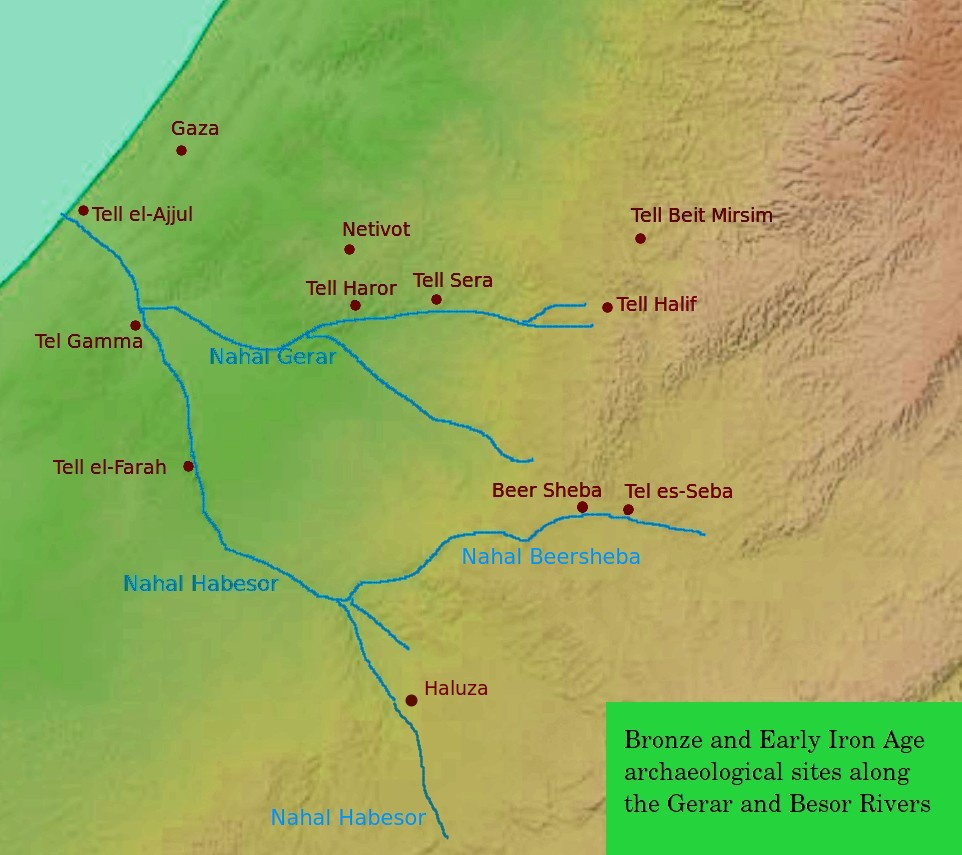
The position of Haluza (at the bottom of map) along the Besor River

The ruins of Halusa are located in a large plain 20 km (12 mi) southwest of Beersheba, Israel. Many inscriptions have been found there.

In 1980, the Cobb Institute of Archaeology at Mississippi State University sponsored an archaeological excavation at the site, in a partnership with the Hebrew University of Jerusalem. Jack D. Elliott, Jr. subsequently published an excavation report in 1982 through the Cobb Institute titled The Elusa Oikoumene: A Geographical Analysis of an Ancient Desert Ecosystem.

In 2014, two archaeological survey-excavations were conducted at Haluza on behalf of the University of Cologne in Germany and Haifa University. Archaeological surveys of the area are partly hampered by the presence of shifting sands. However, Nabataean streets have been found, along with two Byzantine-period churches, a theatre, wine press and tower.

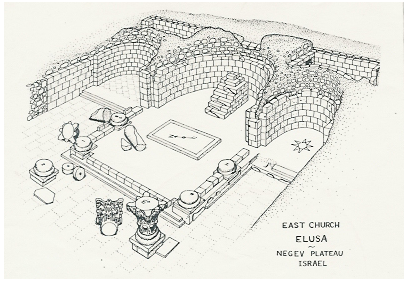
Isometric view of Elusa Cathedral (East Church), 1980 dig, Mississippi State University & Hebrew University of Jerusalem

A Greek inscription bearing the name of the city was discovered at Elusa, tentatively dated to the time of Emperor Diocletian around 300 CE. The announcement was made in March 2019 by the excavating German–Israeli team.

=== Pre-Muslim decline ===
By analysing rubbish removed from the city, it has been determined that it underwent a major decline around the middle of the sixth century, about a century before the Islamic conquest. The excavators propose that their findings call for a reevaluation of the settlement history of the Negev region in the late Byzantine period. One possible cause for the crisis is raised as the Late Antique Little Ice Age, a cold snap believed to have been caused by "volcanic winter".

== Biblical association ==
According to a 1906 article from the Revue Biblique written by Antonin Jaussen, in the vicinity, according to the Targums, was the desert of Sur with the well at which the angel found Hagar (Genesis 16:7).

== See also ==
- Archaeology of Israel
- Tourism in Israel
