= Michael Evenari =

Israeli botanist and pioneer of desert agriculture

- מיכאל אבן-ארי
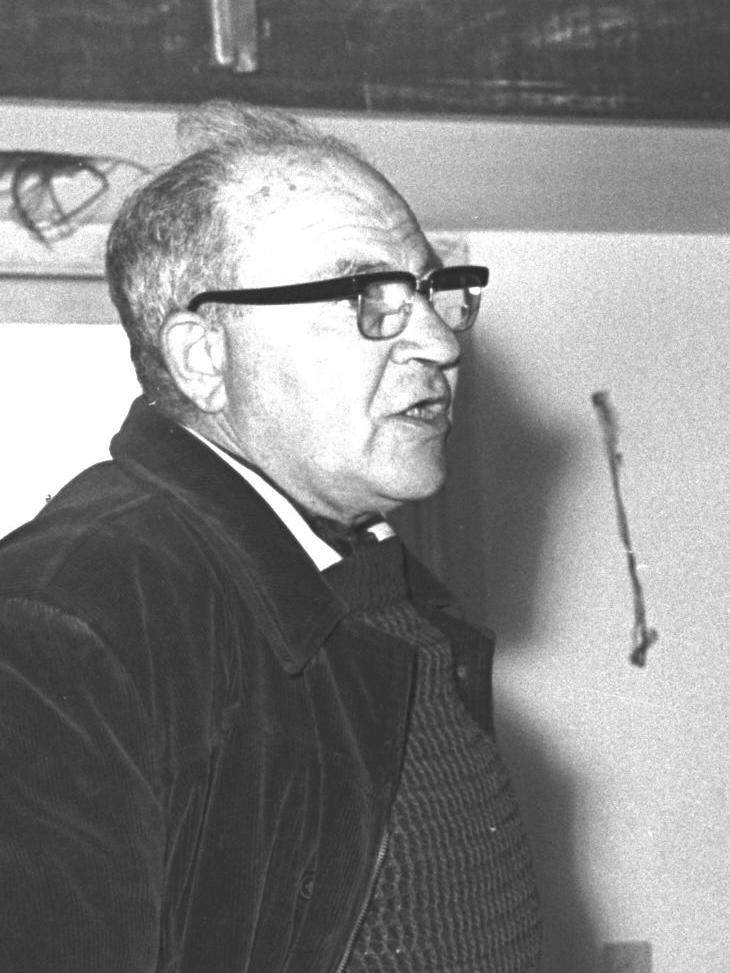
- Prof. Evenari lecturing to the Circle of Friends of the Sde Boker Midrasha School, 1966
- Born: 9 October 1904; Metz, Lorraine, Germany
- Died: 15 April 1989 (aged 84); Jerusalem, Israel
- Known for: Nabataean agriculture, Desert agriculture, Runoff rainwater management, Algae fuel
- Awards: Leopoldina (1966); Israel Prize (1986); Balzan Prize (1988)

Academic background
- Education: Darmstadt University of Technology
- Doctoral advisor: Martin Möbius

Academic work
- Institutions: Hebrew University of Jerusalem

Michael Evenari (Hebrew: מיכאל אבן-ארי, even-ari meaning lion's stone; born as Walter Schwarz 9 October 1904 in Metz – 15 April 1989 in Jerusalem) was an Israeli botanist originally from Germany.

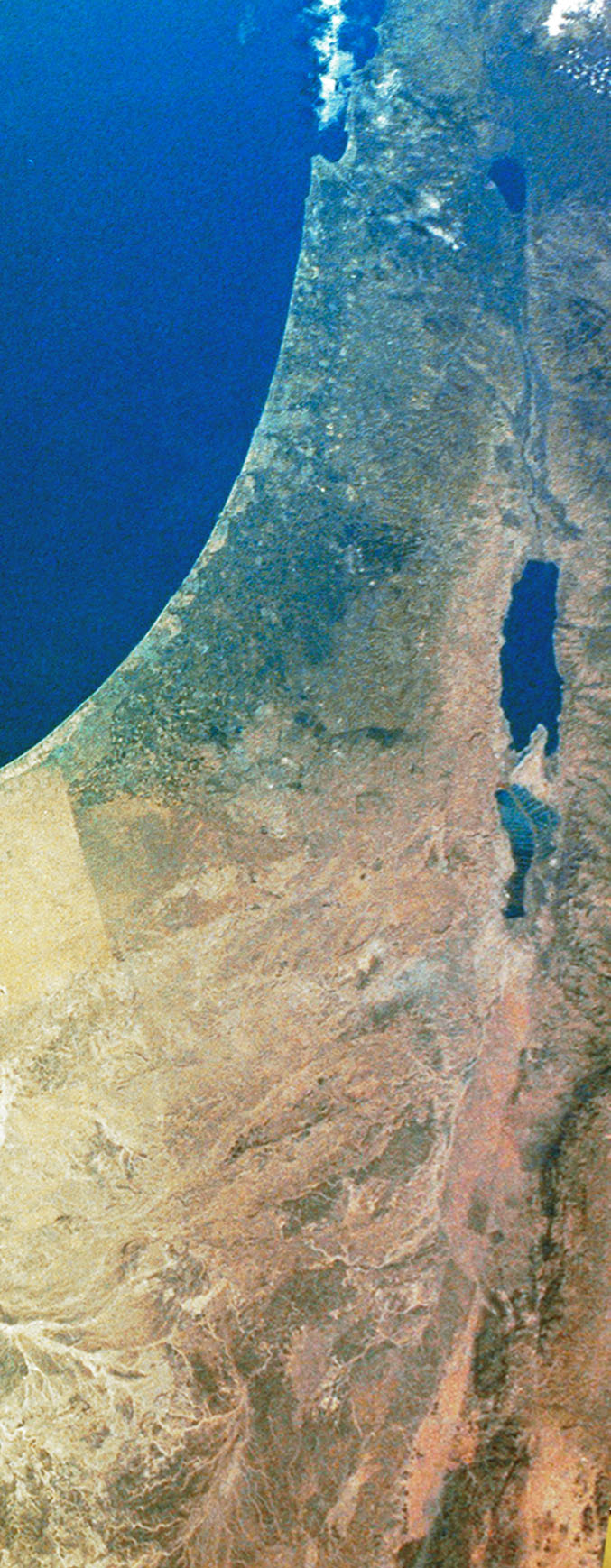
Israel can be spotted from satellites easily, as the greener and darker (more humid) part of the region. The work of Michael Evenari and other pioneers of Agricultural research in Israel contributed to the effect

== Life and career ==
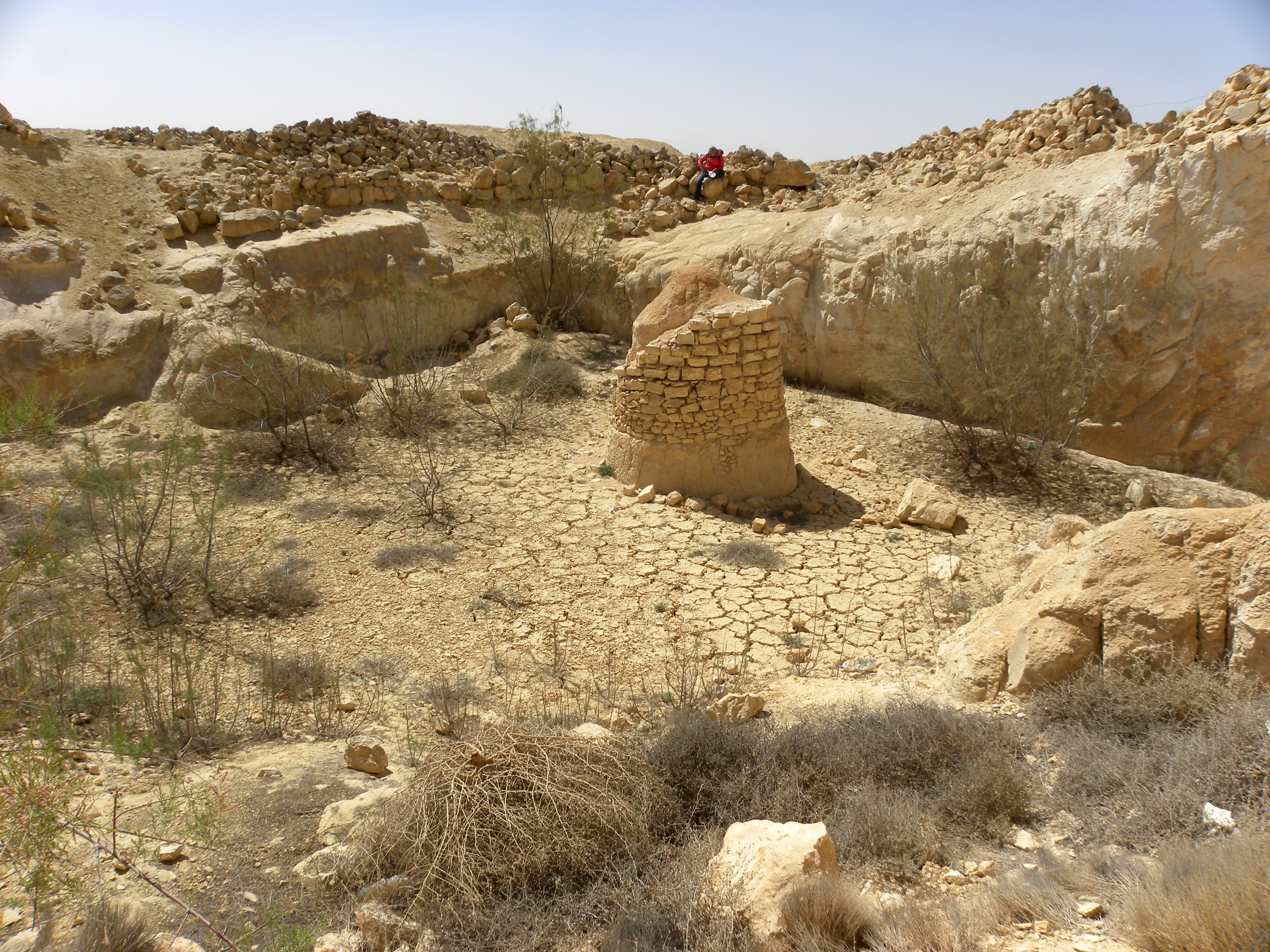
Remains of a Nabataean cistern north of Makhtesh Ramon, southern Israel.

=== Early life and education in Germany ===
Evenari was born as Walter Schwarz to parents who identified as German Jews. They lived as merchants in Lorraine, a province that changed hands repeatedly between France and Germany. After World War I Metz became French again, and the Schwarz family opted for Germany, being forced to emigrate. Evenari was a brother-in-law of writer Gerson Stern. Evenari grew up close to Marburg and Buchenau in Hesse. He studied botany at Darmstadt University of Technology and received his doctorate 1927 under the auspices of Martin Möbius.

=== British Mandate and Israel ===
Evenari fled Nazi Germany on 1 April 1933 and was active in Jerusalem as professor at the Hebrew University of Jerusalem.

During World War II Evenari served in the British Army. Evenari joined Haganah and fought in the 1948 Palestine war.

His works on the Nabataeans runoff rainwater management was crucial for modern Israeli agriculture and explained as well how the Nabataean culture was able to supply thousands of inhabitants in a similar arid climate. Evenari showed that the runoff rainwater collection systems concentrate water from larger areas and in so far allow to grow plants with higher water needs in the given arid environment. The mechanism explained a variety of ancient agricultural features, terraced wadis, channels for collecting runoff rainwater, and the phenomenon of "Tuleilat el-Anab", grape mounds.

Evenari himself cared about the cultural heritage of the Bedouin and saw them more as 'fathers' than 'sons of the desert'.

He worked as well on algae fuel, a special sort of renewable resource and biofuel.

== Awards and honours ==
In 1966, Evenari was appointed member of the Leopoldina, the German national academy of sciences, and in 1977 his alma mater, the Darmstadt University of Technology, provided him with an honorary doctorate. Evenari received the Israel Prize in 1986 and in 1988, together with Otto Ludwig Lange, the Balzan Prize. In 2001, the Evenarí Forum, a Darmstadt-based centre for German-Jewish studies in the fields of technology, nature sciences, history and cultural studies, was named in his honour, and in 2010 a Stolperstein bearing his name was laid in the Darmstadt university campus.

== Published books, a selection ==
- together with Leslie Shanan and Naphtali Tadmor: The Negev. The Challenge of a Desert. Harvard University Press, Cambridge (Mass.) 1971; 1982, ISBN 0674606728
- Ökologisch-landwirtschaftliche Forschungen im Negev. Analyse eines Wüsten-Ökosystems. Technische Hochschule, Darmstadt 1982, ISBN 3-88607-024-7
- Und die Wüste trage Frucht. Ein Lebensbericht. Bleicher, Gerlingen 1990, ISBN 3-88350-230-8, autobiography

== Links ==
- Michael Evenarí at TU Darmstadt
- Michael Evenari, by Hans-Dieter Arntz
