= Late Antique Little Ice Age =

Northern Hemispheric cooling period

The Late Antique Little Ice Age is seen between the middle of the 6th century and the start of the 7th century, and preceded by the Roman Warm Period.

The Late Antique Little Ice Age (LALIA) was a long-lasting Northern Hemispheric cooling period in the 6th and 7th centuries AD, during the period known as late antiquity. The period coincides with three large volcanic eruptions in 535/536, 539/540 and 547. The volcanic winter of 536 was the early phenomenon of the century-long global temperature decline. One study suggested a global cooling of 2 °C (3.6 °F). The period contributed to the decline of the Roman Empire and influenced the second wave migration period, primarily of the early Slavs.

== Term ==
The term and concept were first coined and described in February 2016, in the Nature Geoscience article titled "Cooling and societal change during the Late Antique Little Ice Age from 536 to around 660 AD" by Ulf Büntgen, et al.

== Eruptions ==
The existence of a cooling period was proposed as a theory in 2015, and subsequently confirmed as the period from AD 536 to about 660. Volcanic eruptions, meteorites striking the Earth's surface, and comet fragments exploding in the upper atmosphere have been proposed for the climatic cooling in 536 and afterwards. A problem is that no impact crater for a meteorite has been found, even though the land area and sea beds have been well surveyed for evidence. A comet fragment half a kilometer in size exploding in the atmosphere could cause a plume of debris on the Earth and create conditions for atmospheric cooling. Most evidence, however, points to volcanic eruptions occurring in 536, 540, and possibly 547, although the location of the volcano or volcanoes has not been determined. Locations such as Tavurvur in Papua New Guinea, Ilopango in El Salvador, and Krakatau in Indonesia have been proposed.

Investigations in 2018 analyzed ice cores from glaciers in Switzerland and matched glass particles in the cores with volcanic rocks from Iceland, making the island nation a likely candidate for the source of the 536 eruption, although North America is also a possible location. Evidence suggests that Ilopango in El Salvador was the source of the 539/540 eruption. Bipolar ice core investigations suggested that this eruption occurred in the tropics, and tree ring investigations near Ilopango found evidence of an eruption possibly in 540. However, a more recent study, examining other evidence, dated the eruption of Ilopango to 431, so the issue remains unresolved. The eruption, whatever its location, put more aerosols into the atmosphere than the 1815 eruption of Mount Tambora, which caused the Year Without a Summer. Another eruption, location unknown, occurred in 547. Additional evidence comes from a temperature reconstruction from the Euro-Med2k working group of the international PAGES (Past Global Changes) project that used new tree-ring measurements from the Altai Mountains, which closely matches the temperatures in the Alps in the last two centuries. The 2022 study on "106 wood anatomical thin sections from 23 forest sites and 20 tree species in both hemispheres" found "evidence for the strongest temperature depression between mid-July and early-August 536 CE across North America and Eurasia, whereas more localised cold spells occurred in the summers of 532, 540–43, and 548 CE".

The impact of the volcanic eruptions was the phenomenon known as volcanic winter. In the volcanic winter of 536, summer temperatures fell by as much as 2.5 degrees Celsius (4.5 degrees Fahrenheit) below normal in Europe. ("Normal" is considered by scientists to be the average temperatures of the 1961–1990 period.) The lingering impact of the volcanic winter of 536 was augmented in 539–540, when the second volcanic eruption caused summer temperatures to decline as much as 2.7 degrees Celsius (4.9 degrees Fahrenheit) below normal in Europe.

While the volcanic eruptions began the freeze, researchers think that increased ocean ice cover (feedback to the effects of the volcanoes), coupled with an "exceptional" minimum of solar activity in the 600s, reinforced and extended the cooling.

== Impacts ==
=== Arabia ===
According to research by a team from the Swiss Federal Research Institute at Birmensdorf, the fall in temperatures led to the Arabian Peninsula experiencing a dramatic increase in fertility. The boost of food supply contributed to the Arab expansion beyond the peninsula in the Islamic conquests. The cooling period also led to increased strain on the Eastern Roman Empire and the Sassanid Empire, which helped the Muslim conquest of the Levant, the Muslim conquest of Egypt and the Muslim conquest of Persia.

According to research done by Israeli scientists, in 540, the size of the population of the city of Elusa, in the Negev Desert, and the amount of garbage that it generated started to shrink greatly. Elusa housed tens of thousands of people during its height. The major decline took place around the mid-6th century, about a century before the Islamic conquest. One possible explanation for the crisis was the Late Antique Little Ice Age.

=== Europe ===
Estimates of a population loss of up to 50% in Scandinavia resulting from the volcanic eruptions between 536 and 547 are considered reasonable by archaeologists and volcanologists, although the effects were variable and some areas prospered. A group of climate scientists suggested in 2016 that the cumulative effect of the dust veil resulting from the volcanoes lasted in varying degrees for up to eighty years. The disaster was probably the origin of the concept in Norse mythology referred to as Fimbulwinter.

=== Mediterranean region ===
The cooling period coincided with the Plague of Justinian, which began in 541, though the connection between the plague and the volcanoes still remains tenuous. The cooling period contributed to the migrations of the Lombards and the early Slavs into Roman territory in Italy and the Balkans.

According to 2024 research, major plagues that significantly impacted the remnants of the Roman Empire, during the Late Antique Ice Age, are strongly linked to cooler and drier climate conditions, indicating that colder weather may have contributed to the spread of these diseases during that time. It is thought climate stress interacted with social and biological variables, such as food availability, rodent populations, and human migration, making populations more susceptible to disease. On the other hand, Haggai Olshanetsky and Lev Cosijns argue that the plague and LALIA had a limited impact, as various archaeological evidence indicates there was no demographic or economic decline in the 6th century eastern Mediterranean.

=== Far East ===
It may have caused political upheavals in China.

== See also ==
- Migration Period
- Little Ice Age
- Maunder Minimum
- Roman Warm Period
