= Nessana =

Nabataean city

- ניצנה (Hebrew)
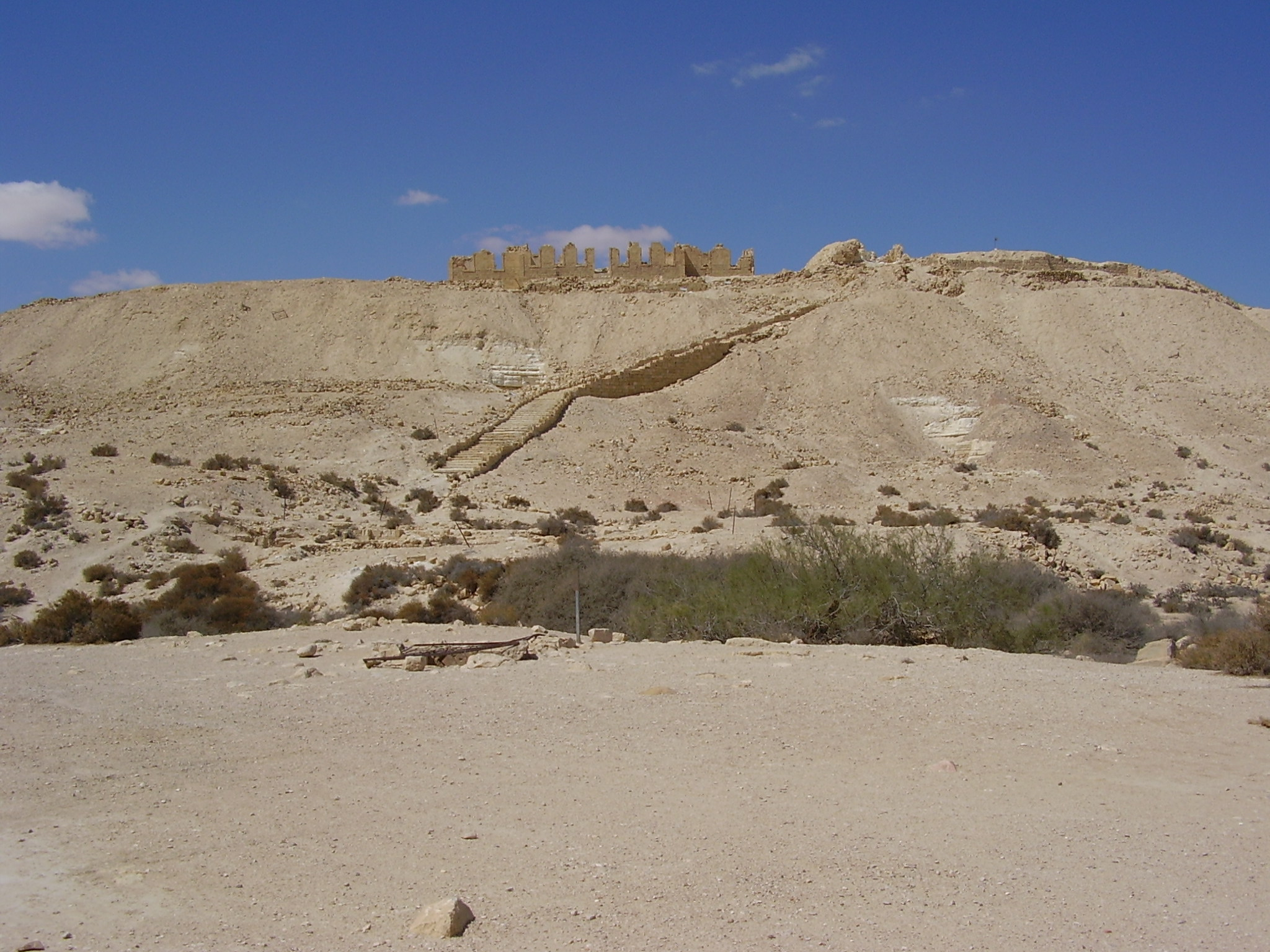
- Tel Nizana

- Location within Israel
- 30°52′34.03″N 34°25′58.20″E
- Type: Settlement
- Cultures: Nabataean, Roman, Byzantine
- Location: Southern District, Israel
- Region: Negev

History
- Built: 1st century BCE
- Abandoned: 7th century CE

Nessana, Modern Hebrew name Nizzana, also spelled Nitzana (Hebrew: ניצנה), is an ancient Nabataean city located in the southwest Negev desert in Israel close to the Egyptian border. It started by being a caravan station on the ancient Incense Road, protecting a western branch of the road which allowed access to Egypt to the west via the Sinai, and to Beersheba, Hebron and Jerusalem to the northeast. It was first used by Nabataean merchants, and later also by Christian pilgrims.

Nessana was among the earlier Nabataean towns of the Negev, established as caravan stations in the late the 4th or the early 3rd century BCE, annexed in 106 CE by the Romans, who garrisoned the site, and inhabited by Byzantine Christians from the fourth century at the latest, until after the Arab Muslim conquest of the seventh century. Relatively few stones remain at the site because most were recycled into buildings in Gaza throughout the centuries.

== Nessana papyri ==
During excavations in 1935–37, a major trove of sixth- and seventh-century papyri in Greek, Latin, Arabic, Nabataean, and Syriac was discovered at this site, revealing a wealth of information about day-to-day life in Nabataean society between 505 and 689 CE, the last phase of Byzantine administration and the earliest phase of Arabic Islam. The papyri make this the best-documented of all the old Nabataean sites in the Negev. The find sites were two store rooms in the ruined Church of Mary Mother of God and of the soldier saints Sergius and Bacchus. Private documents, such as wills, greatly outnumber official ones: a fragmentary text of Virgil and a Latin-Greek glossary of the Aeneid, fragments of the Gospel of John and early seventh-century church archives, and the personal papers of "George, son of Patrick", on the one hand, and the archives of the military unit, "Numerus of the Most Loyal Theodosians" on the other. Onomastics show that the largely Nabataean inhabitants of the city had become Christianized and Romanized in the early centuries CE, as well as documenting the arrival of a Byzantine phylarchate. Many names of ancient cities in the Negev come only from these documents. One of the last of the papyri describes coinage struck and soldiers employed by 'Abd al-Malik, replacing the Roman institutions with a new Umayyad power structure.

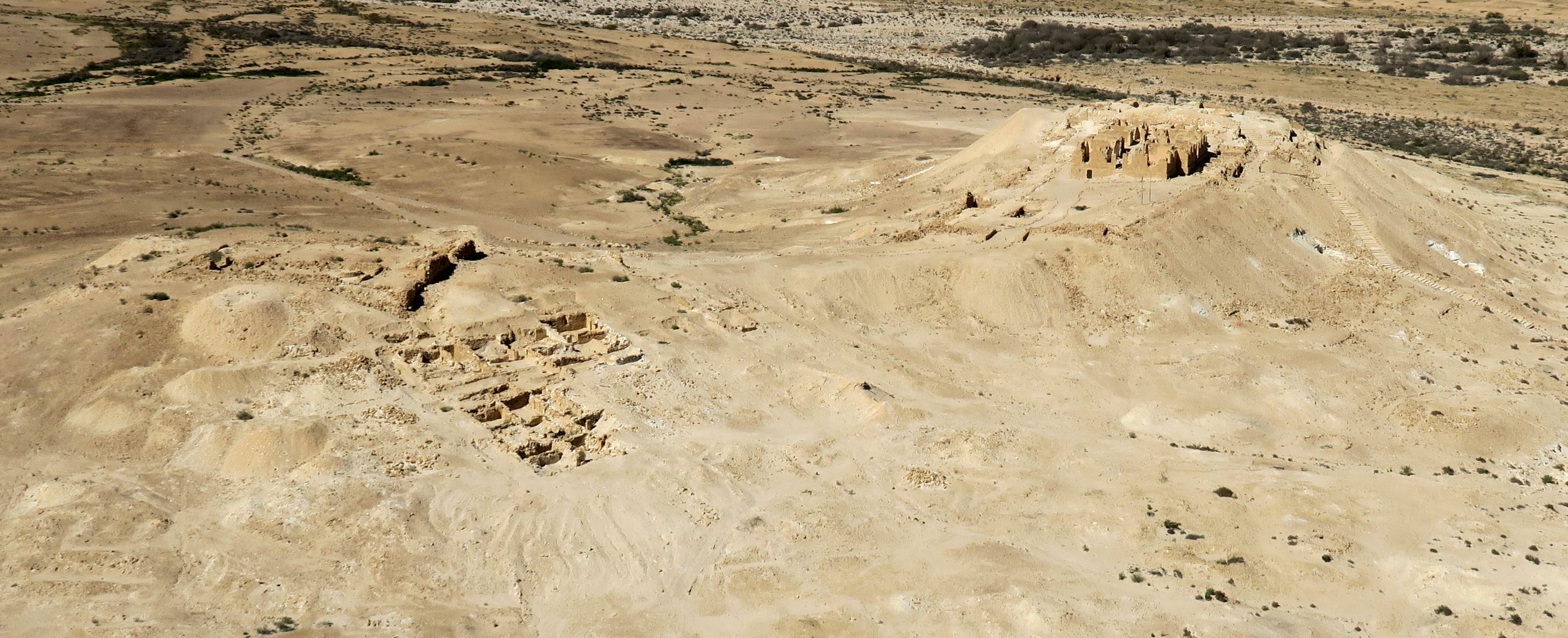
Nitzana (Nabataean city) - aerial view

== Byzantine tombstone inscription ==
In January 2021, archaeologists from the Israel Antiquities Authority (IAA) announced the discovery of a tombstone dating back 1,400 years with a Greek inscription by an employee of the Israel Nature and Parks Authority at Nitzana National Park in the Negev desert. On the Christian woman's stone named Maria, these words were written: 'Blessed Maria who lived an immaculate life'.

== Gallery ==
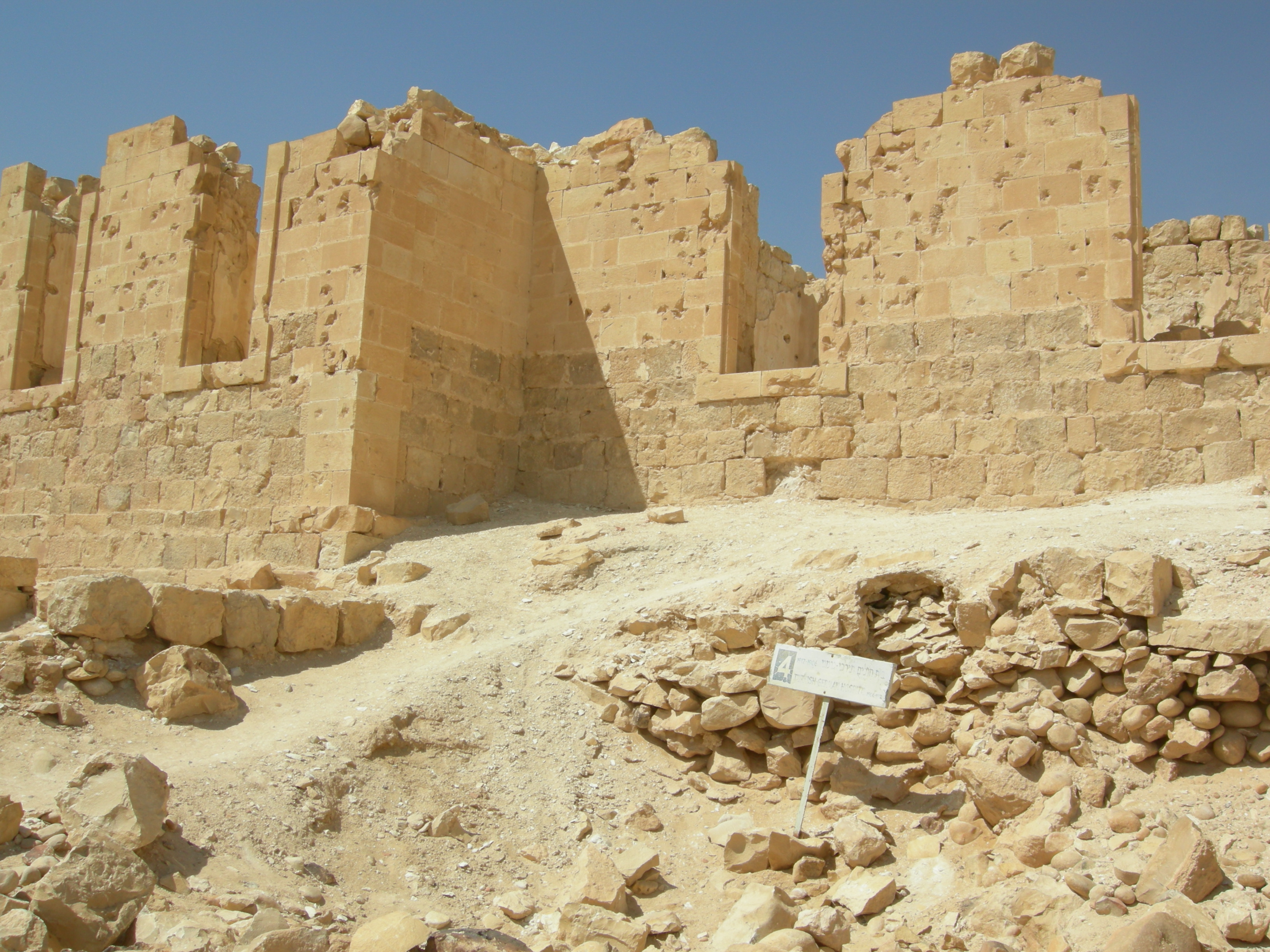
German-Turkish hospital (1906-1917) built on ruins of Byzantine fort at Nizana. Note battle damage.

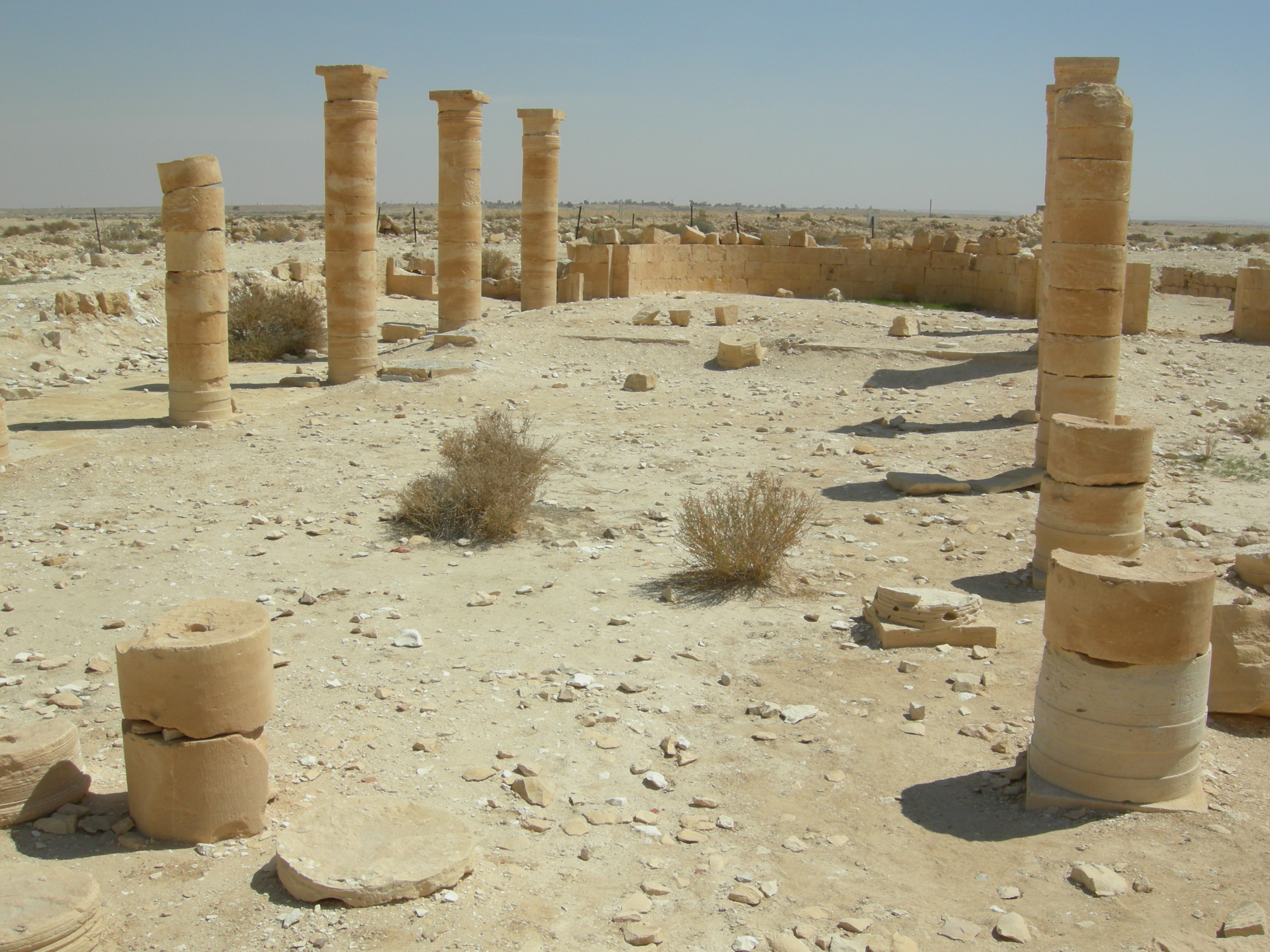
Remains of a Byzantine church at Nizana.

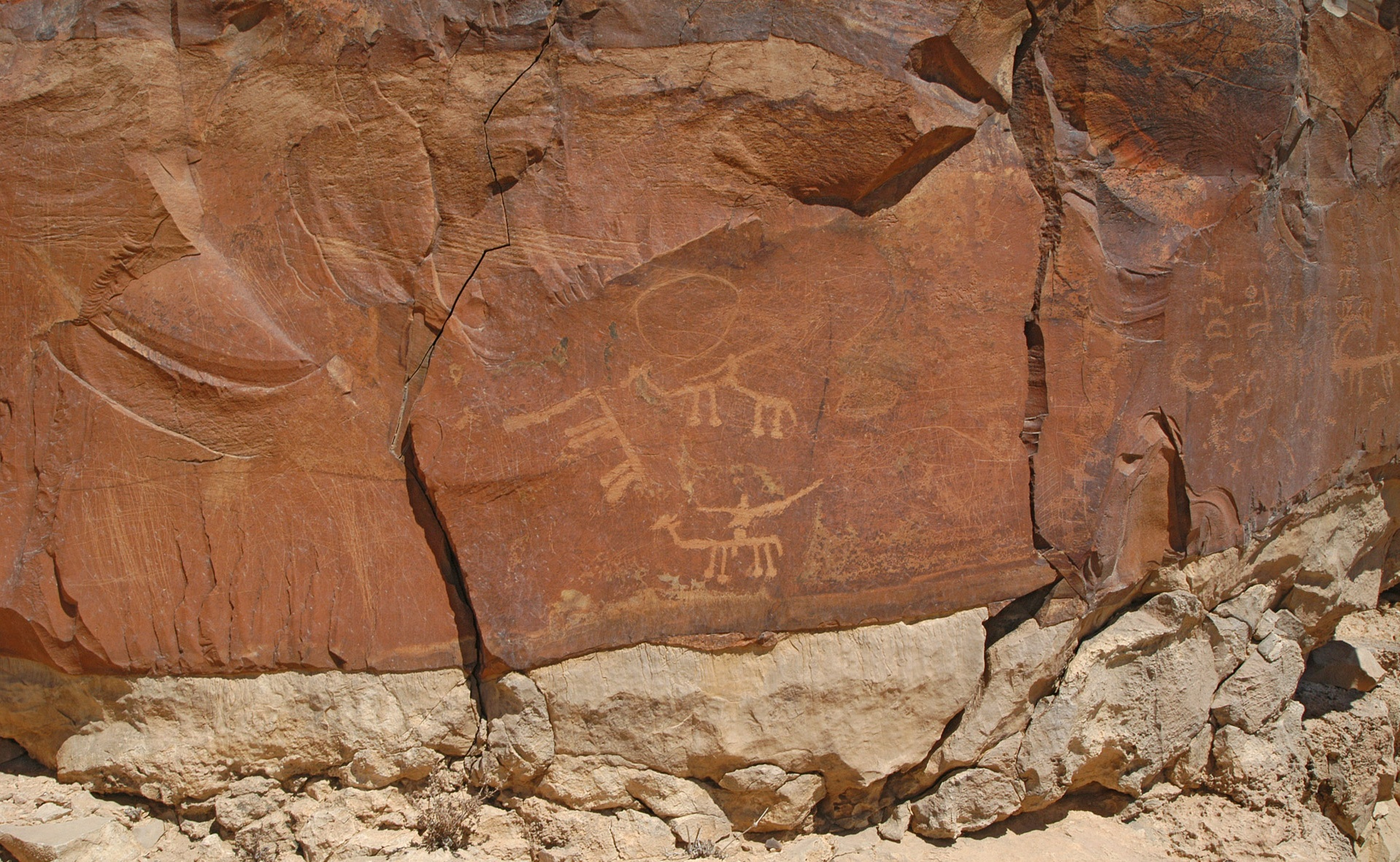
Ancient petroglyphs near Tel Nizana.

== See also ==
- Gaza wine, produced in part at Nessana
- Nitzana – a modern-day village near the ruins
- Auja al-Hafir
