= Lotz Cisterns =

- בורות לוץ (Hebrew)
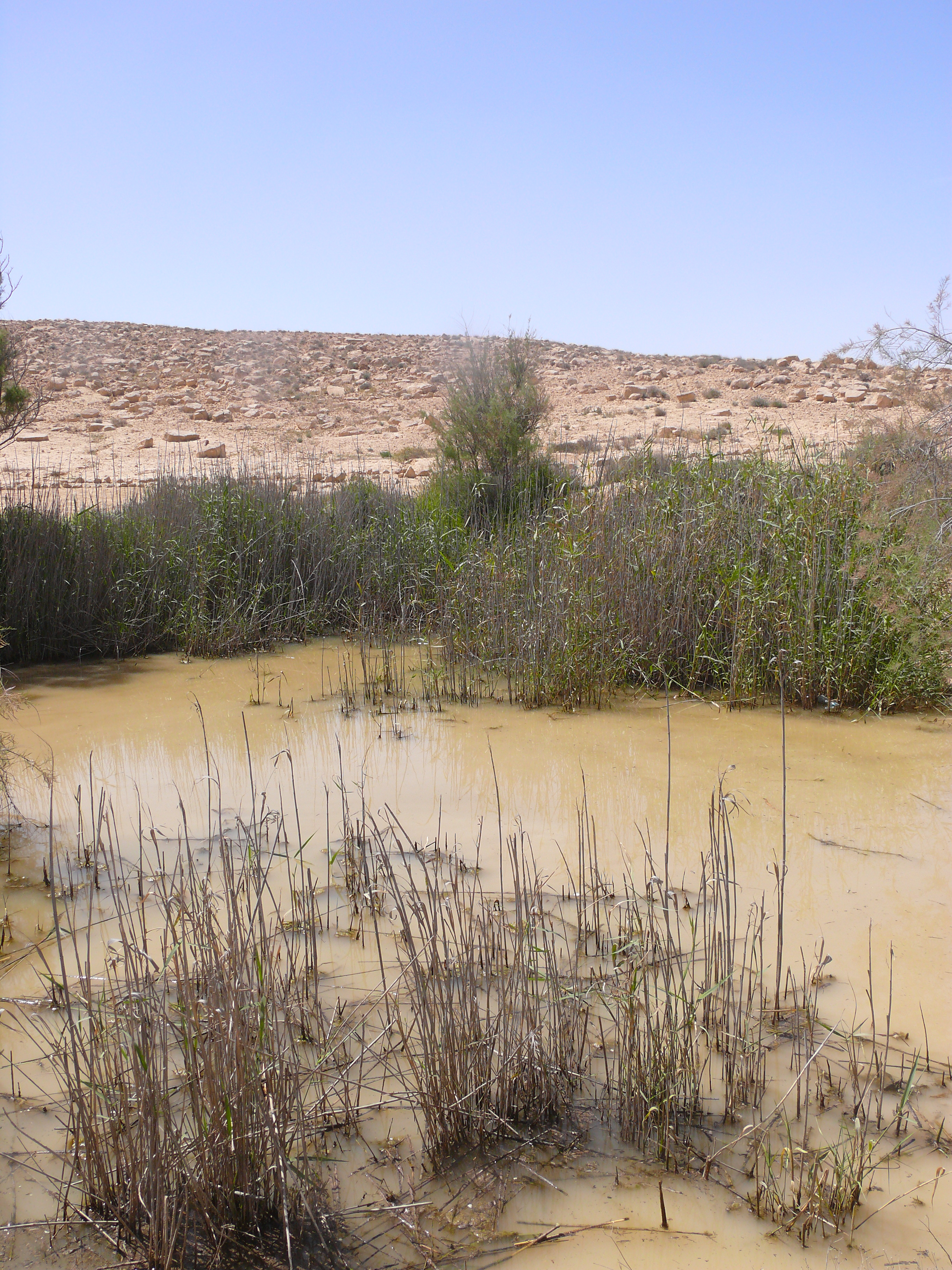
- The “Large Cistern” at Lotz Cisterns site

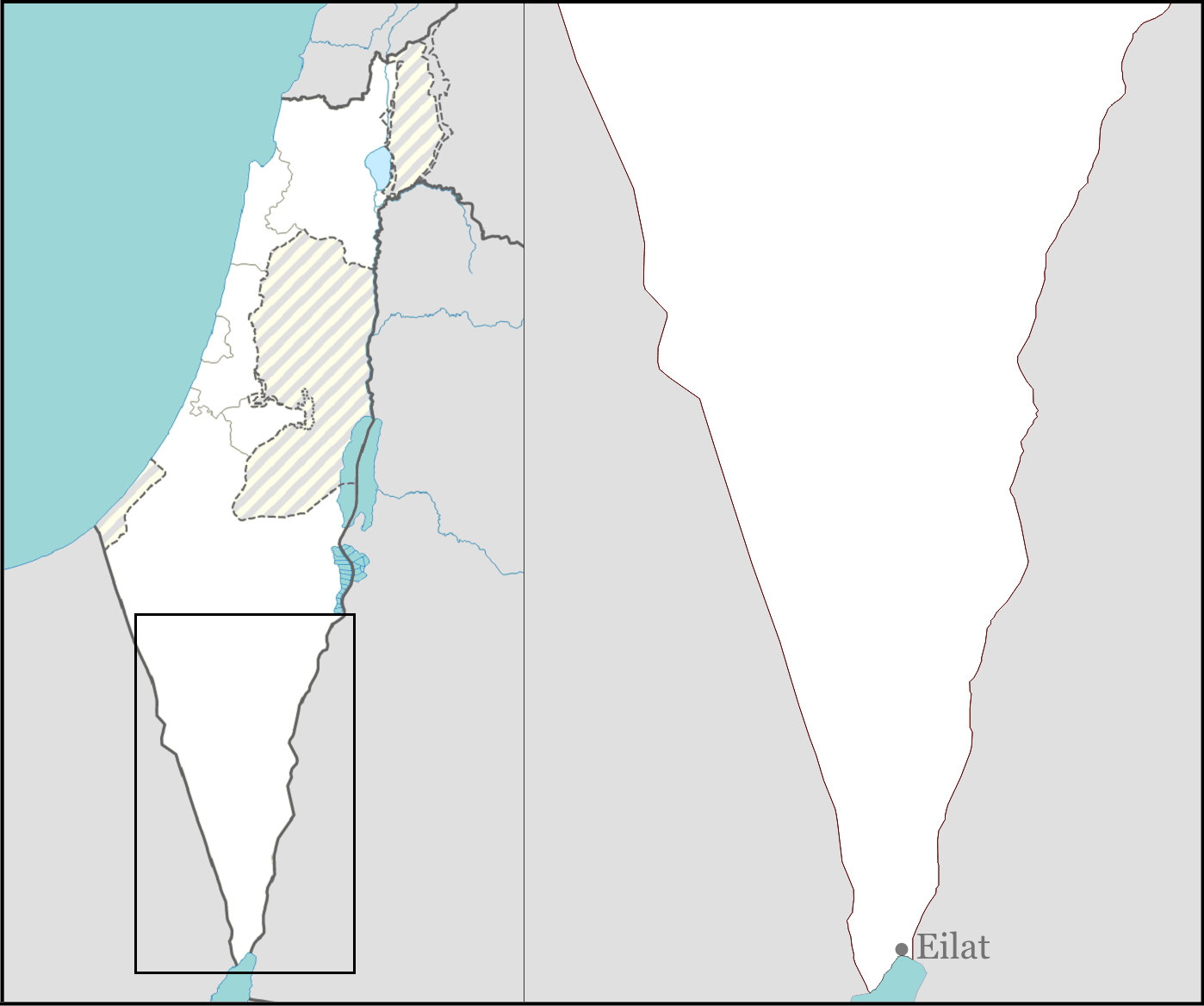
- Location within Southern Negev region of Israel
- 30°30′48″N 34°36′32″E
- Type: water cisterns
- Location: Negev Mountains, Israel

Site notes
- Area: about 2 km^{2}
- Archaeologists: Nelson Glueck

Lotz Cisterns (Hebrew: בורות לוץ, Borot Lotz; the spelling Loz is used, too) is an archaeological site in Negev Mountains, Israel, where 17 ancient water cisterns are located. Of those, about 8 are still filled with water after winter rains.

The cisterns are spread over an area of two square kilometers in the vicinity of Mount Ramon. At the site, there is also an ancient pistacia atlantica tree. During the winter and spring months, numerous flowers grow in the area, primarily around sources of water.

The first research on the sites was performed by Nelson Glik in the 1950s. The cisterns were rarely visited by Israelis until they became accessible by road in the 1980s. In 1980, following the peace agreement with Egypt, interest in the Negev began to grow. Route 171 was paved to the site, where archaeological excavations and restoration was conducted in cooperation with moshav members. Until these excavations, the prevailing view, introduced by archaeologist Yohanan Aharoni, had been that the cisterns were dug during the reign of Solomon, and that they were in use until the Babylonian Captivity. However, with the discovery of Canaanite artifacts at the site, many began to believe that the cisterns are even older.

Because the site is located in one of the most isolated regions in Israel, and as a result has little light pollution, it is a popular spot for amateur astronomy.

The site is located at an average altitude of 950 meters above sea level. It features two primary cisterns located near the main campground. The first, known as the "Small Cistern," has a round shape, measuring 5 meters in diameter and 2 meters in depth. It is connected via a conduit system to the second, larger reservoir called the "Good Water Cistern". This oval-shaped cistern measures 7 by 10 meters and is dug 3 meters deep into the ground, lined with rough-hewn stones to prevent collapse.

Beyond water collection, archaeology shows that people have used this wider area for thousands of years. The earliest towns in the region date back to around 10,000 BC, during the late Stone Age. Later studies also found old buildings and objects from the Bronze Age, Iron Age, and early Arab periods.

The area is currently designated as the Loz Nature Reserve. It features a developed public campground located on the western side of the cistern cluster, serving as a starting point for several marked hiking trails that pass through the historic water systems. Visitors can access the site by turning onto Route 171 from Route 40, at an intersection located approximately 6 kilometers north of Mitzpe Ramon.

In addition to the water systems, the valley features ancient stone terraces, primarily along the tributaries of Nahal Eilot. These structures were built by ancient farmers, such as the Nabataeans, to capture rainwater runoff and create fertile plots for desert agriculture. The surrounding environment supports unique desert flora, including wild almond bushes and Atlantic pistachio trees. During the late winter and early spring, typically between February and April, the landscape experiences a seasonal bloom, where carpets of flowers, such as the Negev Iris and wild tulips, draw many hikers to the area.
