= Yakir (name) =

Yakir is a Hebrew name. Notable people with the name include:

- Dan Yakir (born 1953), Israeli Biogeochemist
- Iona Yakir (1896–1937), Red Army commander
- Yakir Aharonov (born 1932), Israeli physicist
- Yakir Gueron (1813–1874), Turkish rabbi
