= Negev =

Desert in southern Israel

Negev: הַנֶּגֶב (Hebrew); النقب (Arabic)
- Desert, semidesert
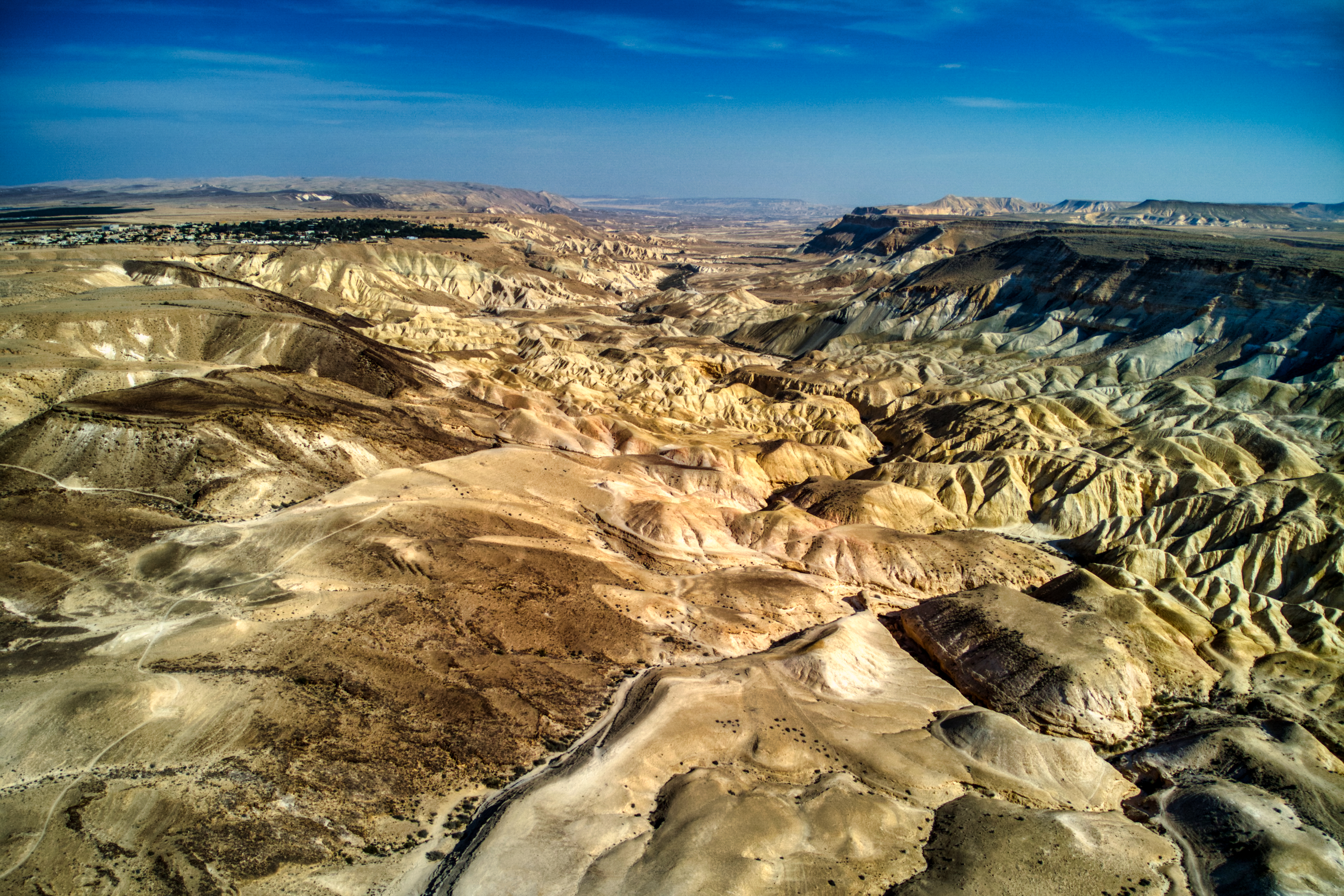
- The Zin Valley and Nahal Havarim, near Midreshet Ben-Gurion
- Interactive map of Negev
- Coordinates: 30°50′N 34°45′E
- Part of: Israel
- Highest elevation: 1,037 m (3,402 ft) (Mount Ramon)

The Negev (/ˈnɛɡɛv/ NEG-ev; Hebrew: הַנֶּגֶב, romanized: haNégev) or Naqab (Arabic: النقب, romanized: an-Naqab) is the name for a desert and semidesert area in southern Israel. Today, it forms the bulk of the Southern District of Israel, whose largest city and administrative capital is Beersheba (pop. 223,587), in the north of the Negev. At its southern end lie the Gulf of Aqaba and the resort city and port of Eilat. It contains several development towns, including Dimona, Arad, and Mitzpe Ramon, as well as a number of small Bedouin towns, including Rahat, Tel Sheva, and Lakiya. There are also several kibbutzim, including Revivim and Sde Boker; the latter became the home of Israel's first prime minister, David Ben-Gurion, after his retirement from politics.

The desert is home to the Ben-Gurion University of the Negev, whose faculties include the Jacob Blaustein Institutes for Desert Research and the Albert Katz International School for Desert Studies, both located on the Midreshet Ben-Gurion campus adjacent to Sde Boker.

In October 2012, global travel guide publisher Lonely Planet rated the Negev second on a list of the world's top ten regional travel destinations for 2013, noting its current transformation through development; the area has seen the construction of spa resorts, wineries, and a new international airport. Notable sites include natural and cultural attractions such as the canyon and pools of Ein Avdat, Makhtesh Ramon, the Timna Park, the desert cities of the Incense Road, and the eco-village of Neot Smadar.

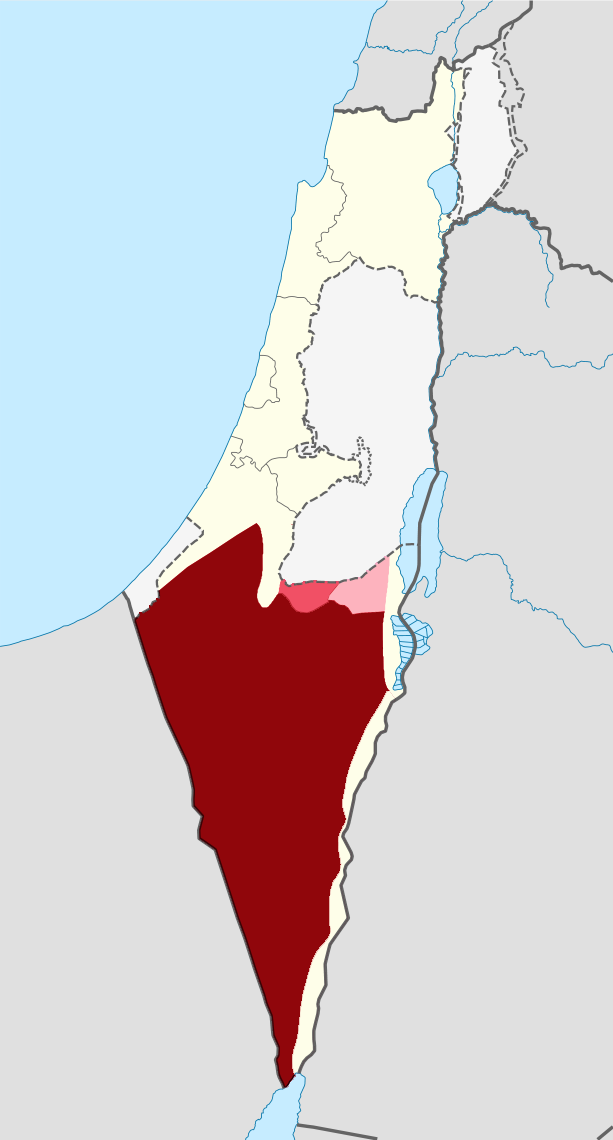
The Negev (red), Israel's parts of Mount Hebron (salmon) and Judaean Desert (pink) on a map of Israel

== Etymology ==
The Hebrew meaning of Negev denoting "arid land" appears to have been borrowed from Aramaic, and originate in a word from the Akkadian language, nagbu. Akkadian nagbu means "groundwater", generally found in semi-arid regions through the digging of wells, and cisterns - a practice for which the Nabataeans and others who called the Negev home in ancient times were renown. This Akkadian loanword into Middle Aramaic and Biblical Hebrew therefore means "water-producing land", but only the meaning "desert" or "dry/arid" was understood and retained by the Aramaic and Hebrew adopters.

The Negev mentioned in the Bible (see below) consisted only of the northernmost part of the modern Israeli Negev, with the semiarid Beersheba-Arad Valley defined as "the eastern (biblical) Negev". Its other meaning in the Hebrew Bible is "south", specifically when used with a definitive article H-ngb and denoting the area of southern Judah, seems to have developed beginning around the late 4th century BC. Some English-language translations use the spelling Negeb.

In Arabic, the Negev is known as an-Naqab or an-Naqb ('the [mountain] pass'), though it was not thought of as a distinct region until the demarcation of the Egypt-Ottoman frontier in the 1890s and has no single Arabic name.

== Geography ==
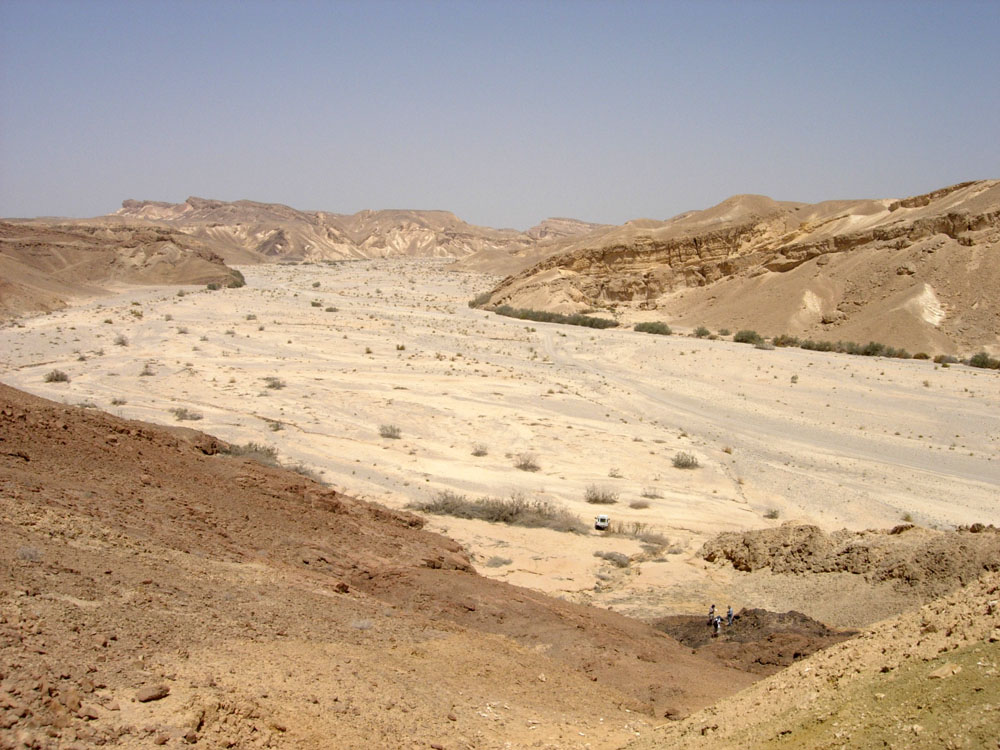
Nahal Paran

The Negev contains the oldest continuously exposed surface discovered on Earth, with an approximate age of 1.8 million years. During the Pleistocene, the Negev fluctuated between intervals of relative humidity and intervals of aridity similar to or even more severe than the present day; from around 80,000 to 13,000 years BP, during a time interval roughly corresponding to the Last Glacial Period, the Negev was significantly more humid than today. It covers more than half of Israel, over some 13,000 km^{2} (5,000 mi^{2}), or at least 55% of the country's land area. It forms an inverted triangle shape whose western side is contiguous with the desert of the Sinai Peninsula, and whose eastern border is the Arabah valley. The Negev has a number of interesting cultural and geological features. Among the latter are three enormous, craterlike makhteshim (box canyons), which are unique to the region: Makhtesh Ramon, HaMakhtesh HaGadol, and HaMakhtesh HaKatan.

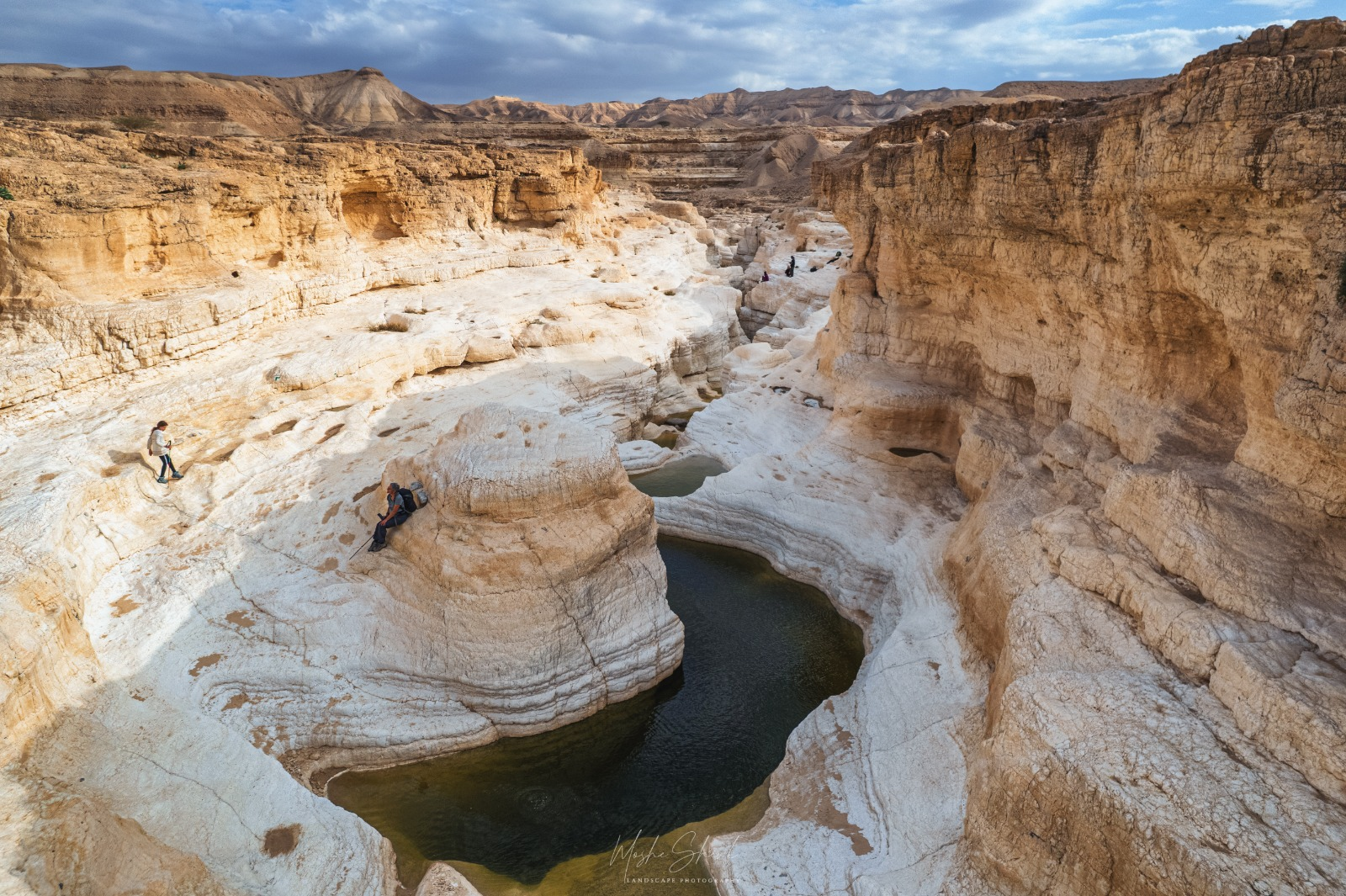
Nahal Zin

The Negev is a rocky desert. It is a melange of brown, rocky, dusty mountains interspersed by wadis (dry riverbeds with plants that flower briefly after rain) and deep craters. It can be split into five different ecological regions: northern, western and central Negev, the high plateau and the Arabah Valley. The northern Negev, or Mediterranean zone, receives 300 mm (12 in) of rain annually and has fairly fertile soil. The western Negev receives 250 mm (9.8 in) of rain per year, with light and partially sandy soil. Sand dunes can reach heights of up to 30 metres (98 ft) here. Home to the city of Beersheba, the central Negev has an annual precipitation of 200 mm (7.9 in) and is characterised by impervious soil, known as loess, allowing minimum penetration of water with greater soil erosion and water runoff.

The high plateau area of Negev Mountains/Ramat HaNegev (Hebrew: רמת הנגב, The Negev Heights) stands between 370 metres (1,210 ft) and 520 metres (1,710 ft) above sea level with extreme temperatures in summer and winter. The area receives 100 mm (3.9 in) of rain per year, with inferior and partially salty soil. The Arabah Valley along the Jordanian border stretches 180 km (110 mi) from Eilat in the south to the tip of the Dead Sea in the north. The Arabah Valley is very arid with barely 50 mm (2.0 in) of rain annually. It has inferior soil, in which little can grow without irrigation and special soil additives.

== Flora and fauna ==
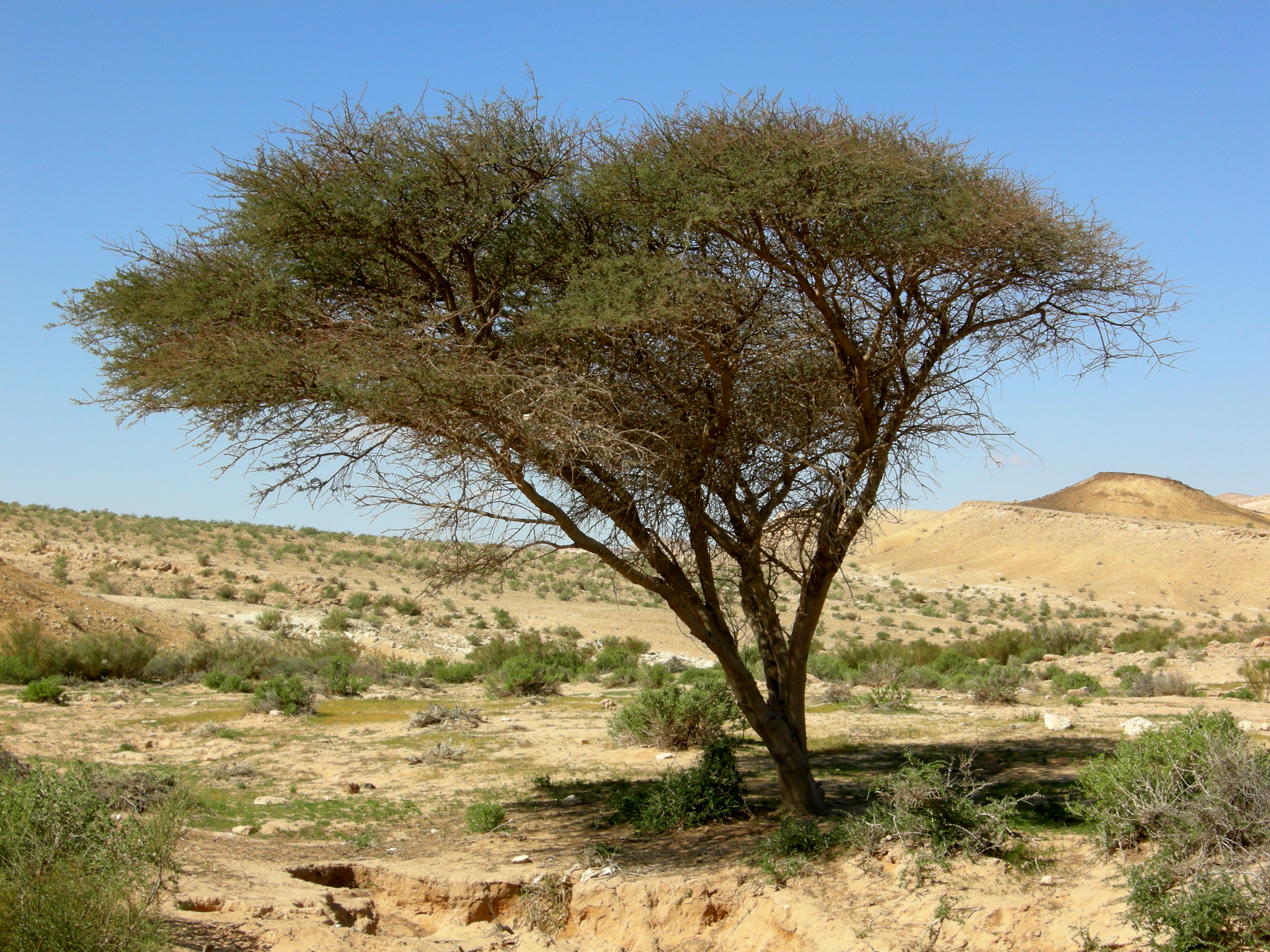
Of the three Acacia species growing in high plateau of the Negev, Acacia pachyceras is the most cold-resistant.

Vegetation in the Negev is sparse, but certain trees and plants thrive there, among them Acacia, Pistacia, Retama, Urginea maritima and Thymelaea. Hyphaene thebaica or doum palm can be found in the Southern Negev. The Evrona Nature Reserve is the most northerly point in the world where this palm can be found.

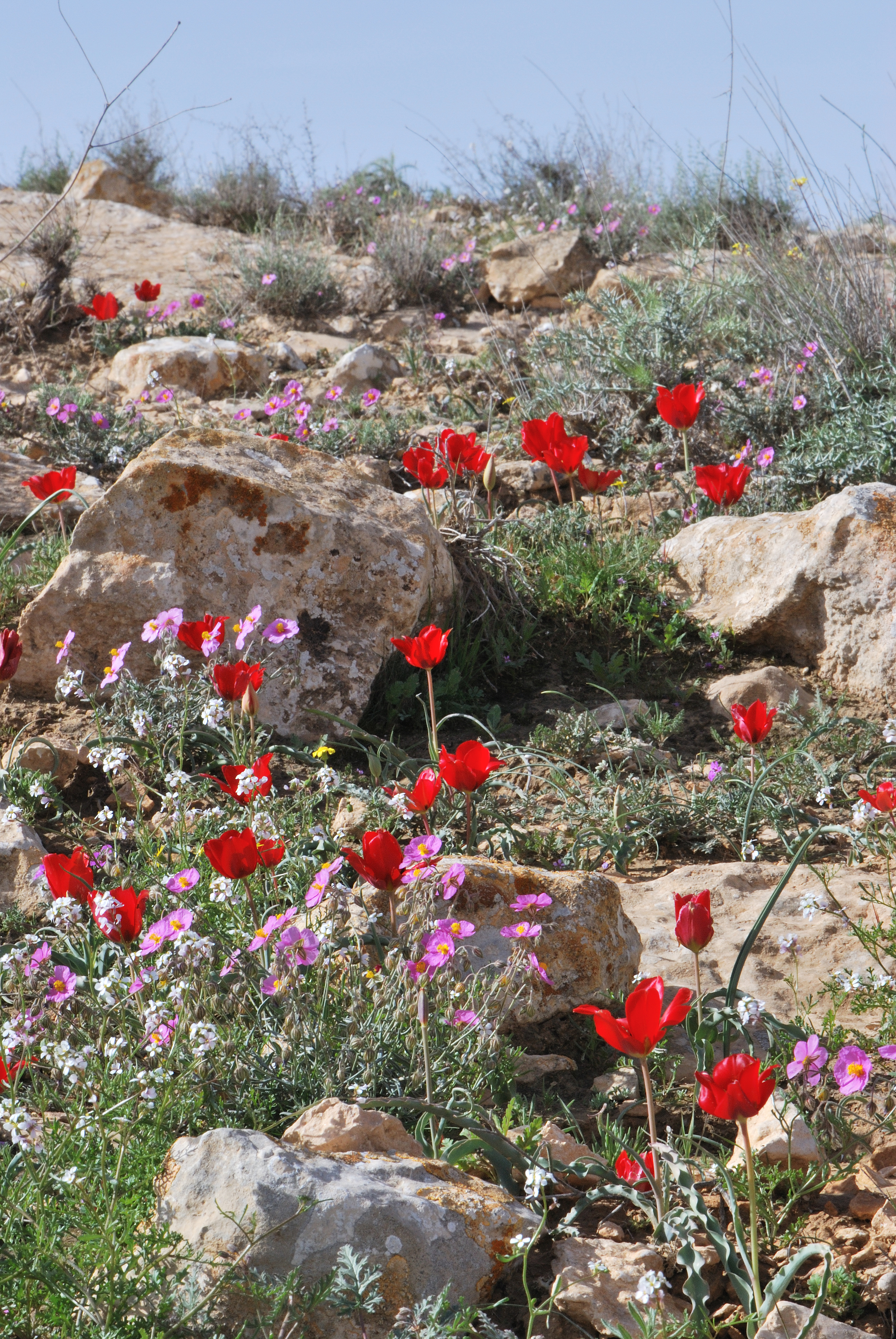
Tulips flowering in the Negev Mountains around early spring

A small population of Arabian leopards, an endangered animal in the Arabian peninsula, has survived in the southern Negev but is now probably extinct. Other carnivora found in the Negev are the caracal, the striped hyena, the Arabian wolf, the golden jackal and the marbled polecat.

The Arabah Arabian gazelle survives with a few individuals in the Negev. The dorcas gazelle is more numerous, with some 1,000–1,500 individuals in the Negev. Some 350 to 500 Nubian ibex live in the Negev Highlands and in the Eilat Mountains.

The Negev shrew is a species of mammal of the family Soricidae that is found only in Israel. A population of the critically endangered Kleinmann's tortoise (also known as the Negev tortoise) survives in the sands of the western and central Negev Desert.

Desert snails of the genus Euchondrus feed on endolithic lichens which live inside limestone rocks, converting rock and lichen into soil, and releasing between 22 and 27 milligrams of nitrogen per square metre of soil through their faeces.

Animals that were reintroduced after their extinction in the wild or localised extinction respectively are the Arabian oryx and the Asiatic wild ass, which in the Negev number about 250 animals.

Like many areas in Israel and the rest of the Middle East, the Negev used to host in the distant past the Asiatic lion and the Asiatic cheetah until their complete extinction at the hands of humans in later centuries.

The Arabian ostrich was once common in the Negev, but became extinct in the 1920s due to widespread hunting by humans. There was an attempt to reintroduce the ostrich to the Negev using the North African ostrich in 2004 but it failed.

== Climate ==
The Negev region is arid (Eilat receives on average only 24 mm (0.94 in) of rainfall a year), receiving very little rain due to its location to the east of the Sahara (as opposed to the Mediterranean, which lies to the west of Israel), and extreme temperatures due to its location 31 degrees north. However the northernmost areas of the Negev, including Beersheba, are semi-arid. The usual rainfall total from June to October inclusive is zero. Snow and frost are rare in the northern Negev, and snow and frost are unknown in the vicinity of Eilat in the southernmost Negev.

Climate data for Beersheba
Month	Jan	Feb	Mar	Apr	May	Jun	Jul	Aug	Sep	Oct	Nov	Dec	Year
Record high °C (°F)	28.4 (83.1)	31 (88)	35.4 (95.7)	40.9 (105.6)	42.2 (108.0)	46 (115)	41.5 (106.7)	40.5 (104.9)	41.2 (106.2)	39.6 (103.3)	34 (93)	31.4 (88.5)	46 (115)
Mean daily maximum °C (°F)	16.7 (62.1)	17.5 (63.5)	20.1 (68.2)	25.8 (78.4)	29 (84)	31.3 (88.3)	32.7 (90.9)	32.8 (91.0)	31.3 (88.3)	28.5 (83.3)	23.5 (74.3)	18.8 (65.8)	25.7 (78.3)
Mean daily minimum °C (°F)	7.5 (45.5)	7.6 (45.7)	9.3 (48.7)	12.7 (54.9)	15.4 (59.7)	18.4 (65.1)	20.5 (68.9)	20.9 (69.6)	19.5 (67.1)	16.7 (62.1)	12.6 (54.7)	8.9 (48.0)	14.2 (57.6)
Record low °C (°F)	−5 (23)	−0.5 (31.1)	2.4 (36.3)	4 (39)	8 (46)	13.6 (56.5)	15.8 (60.4)	15.6 (60.1)	13 (55)	10.2 (50.4)	3.4 (38.1)	3 (37)	−5 (23)
Average precipitation mm (inches)	49.6 (1.95)	40.4 (1.59)	30.7 (1.21)	12.9 (0.51)	2.7 (0.11)	0 (0)	0 (0)	0 (0)	0.4 (0.02)	5.8 (0.23)	19.7 (0.78)	41.9 (1.65)	204.1 (8.04)
Average precipitation days	9.2	8	6.4	2.6	0.8	0	0	0	0.1	1.8	4.6	7.5	41
Source: Israel Meteorological Service

Climate data for Eilat
Month	Jan	Feb	Mar	Apr	May	Jun	Jul	Aug	Sep	Oct	Nov	Dec	Year
Record high °C (°F)	32.2 (90.0)	35.8 (96.4)	38.7 (101.7)	43.4 (110.1)	45.2 (113.4)	47.4 (117.3)	48.3 (118.9)	48.0 (118.4)	45.0 (113.0)	44.3 (111.7)	38.1 (100.6)	33.6 (92.5)	48.3 (118.9)
Mean daily maximum °C (°F)	21.3 (70.3)	23.0 (73.4)	26.1 (79.0)	31.0 (87.8)	35.7 (96.3)	38.9 (102.0)	40.4 (104.7)	40.0 (104.0)	37.3 (99.1)	33.1 (91.6)	27.7 (81.9)	23.0 (73.4)	31.5 (88.6)
Mean daily minimum °C (°F)	10.4 (50.7)	11.8 (53.2)	14.6 (58.3)	18.4 (65.1)	22.5 (72.5)	25.2 (77.4)	27.3 (81.1)	27.4 (81.3)	25.2 (77.4)	21.8 (71.2)	16.3 (61.3)	11.9 (53.4)	19.4 (66.9)
Record low °C (°F)	1.2 (34.2)	0.9 (33.6)	3.0 (37.4)	8.4 (47.1)	12.1 (53.8)	18.5 (65.3)	20.0 (68.0)	19.4 (66.9)	18.6 (65.5)	9.2 (48.6)	5.3 (41.5)	2.5 (36.5)	0.9 (33.6)
Average rainfall mm (inches)	4 (0.2)	3 (0.1)	3 (0.1)	2 (0.1)	1 (0.0)	0 (0)	0 (0)	0 (0)	0 (0)	4 (0.2)	2 (0.1)	5 (0.2)	24 (1)
Average rainy days (≥ 0.1 mm)	2.1	1.8	1.6	0.9	0.7	0	0	0	0	0.7	0.8	1.9	10.5
Source: Israel Meteorological Service

== History ==
=== Prehistorical nomads ===
Nomadic life in the Negev dates back at least 4,000 years and perhaps as much as 7,000 years.

=== Bronze Age ===
The first urbanised settlements were established by a combination of Canaanite, Amalekite, Amorite, Nabataean and Edomite groups c. 2000 BCE. Pharaonic Egypt is credited with introducing copper mining and smelting in both the Negev and the Sinai between 1400 and 1300 BC.

=== Biblical ===
==== Extent of biblical Negev ====
According to Israeli archaeologists, in the Hebrew Bible, the term Negev only relates to the northern, semi-arid part of what we call Negev today; of this, the Arad-Beersheba Valley, which receives enough rain to permit agriculture and therefore sedentary occupation (the "desert fringe"), is accordingly defined as "the eastern (biblical) Negev".

==== Biblical reference ====
According to the Book of Genesis chapter 13, Abraham lived for a while in the Negev after being banished from Egypt (Genesis 13:1,3). During the Exodus journey to the Promised Land, Moses sent twelve scouts into the Negev to assess the land and population (Numbers 13:17). Later the northern part of biblical Negev was inhabited by the Tribe of Judah and the southern part of biblical Negev by the Tribe of Simeon. The Negev was later part of the Kingdom of Solomon (in its entirety, all the way to the Red Sea), and then, with varied extension to the south, part of the Kingdom of Judah.

=== Iron Age ===
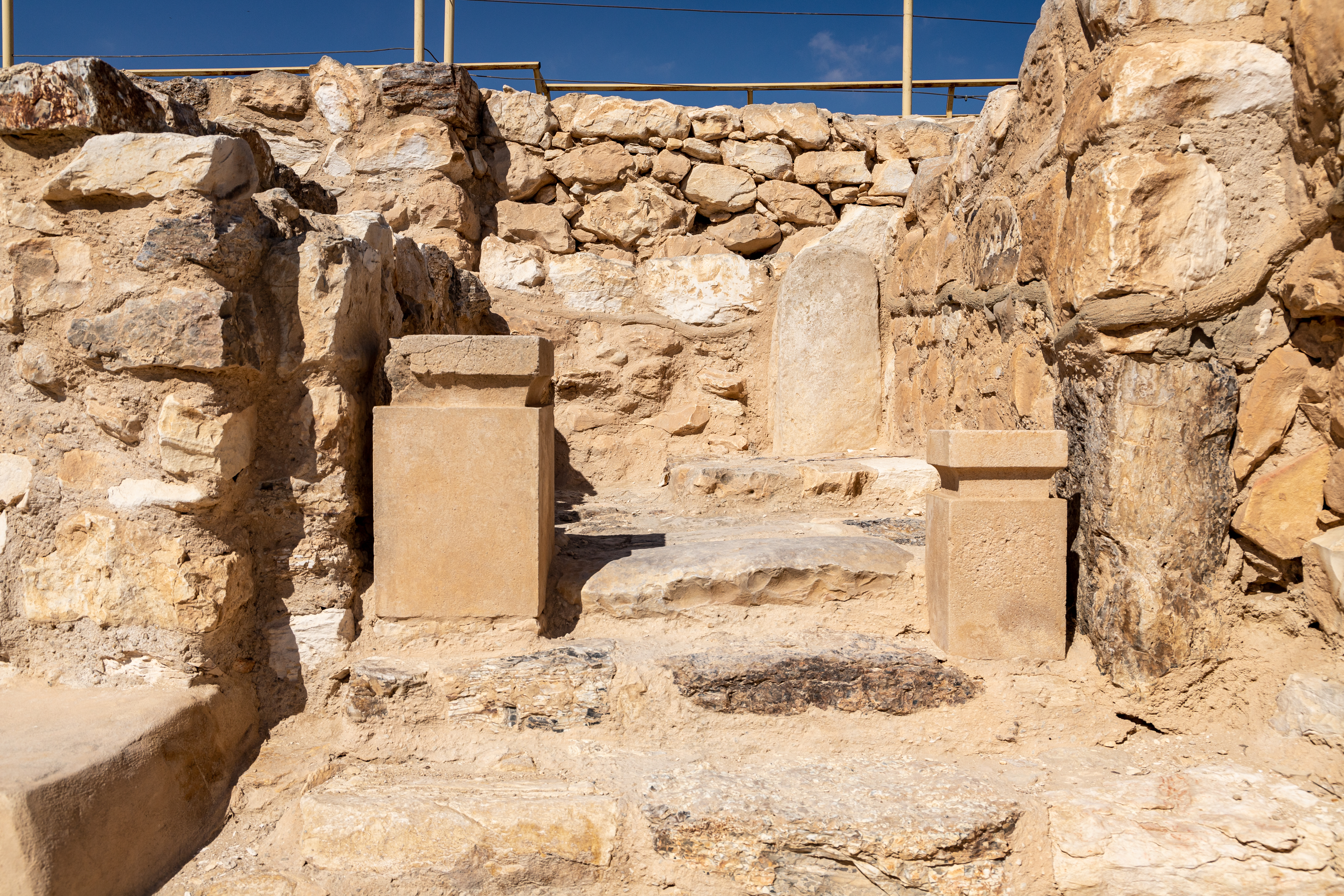
Judean shrine at Tel Arad

In the 9th century BC, development and expansion of mining in both the Negev and Edom (modern Jordan) coincided with the rise of the Assyrian Empire. Beersheba was the region's capital and a centre for trade in the 8th century BCE. Small settlements of Israelites in the areas around the capital existed between 1020 and 928 BCE.

=== Nabateans and Romans ===
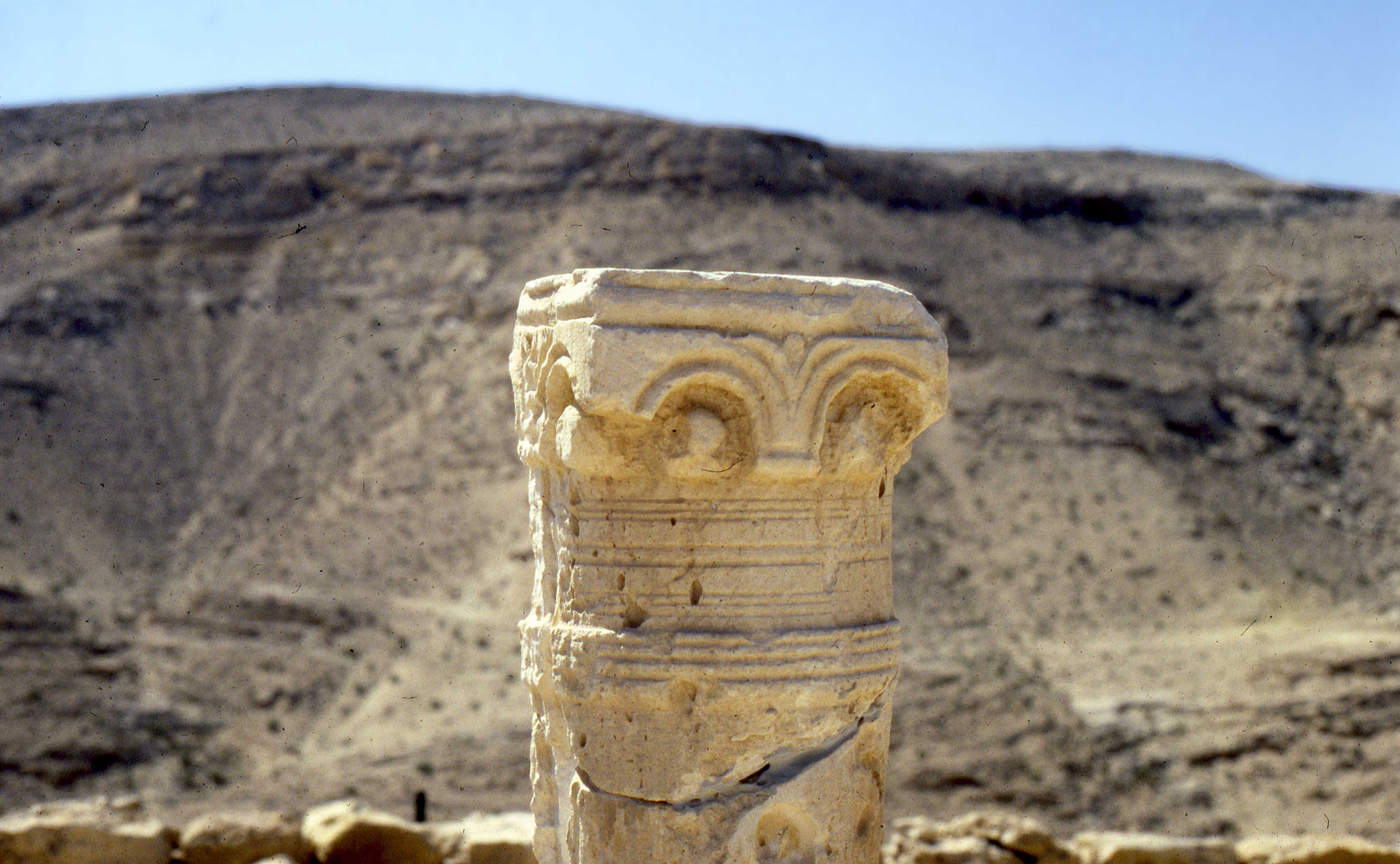
Ancient column with capital in the Negev

The 4th-century BC arrival of the Nabateans resulted in the development of irrigation systems that supported new urban centres located along the Negev incense route at Avdat (Oboda), Mamshit (Mampsis), Shivta (Sobata), Haluza (Elusa), and Nitzana (Nessana). This at least was the prevailing theory, until more recent research showed that the earliest form of Nabataean agriculture in the Negev Highlands was only based on spring-water irrigation, with the much more extensive run-off water harvesting techniques using barrages and terraces apparently developing and being used only later, during the 4th-7th centuries AD, after the 3rd-century collapse of long-distance trade.

The Nabateans controlled the trade on the spice route between their capital Petra and the Gazan seaports. Nabatean currency and the remains of red and orange potsherds, identified as a trademark of their civilisation, have been found along the route, remnants of which are also still visible. Nabatean control of the Negev ended when the Roman Empire annexed their lands in 106 AD. The population, largely comprising nomads, venerated deities such as Dushara, Allat, and others.

=== Byzantine heydays: desert agriculture ===
Byzantine rule in the 4th century introduced Christianity to the population. Agriculture-based cities were established and the population grew exponentially. As shown by the research conducted by Michael Evenari, novel techniques were employed, such as runoff rainwater collection and management systems, which harvested water from larger areas and directed it onto smaller plots. This permitted the cultivation of plants with much higher water requirements than the given arid environment could provide for. Evenari researched the ancient mechanisms, rediscovered the ratio of water collection area to cultivation area, and explained the various ancient techniques of land amelioration, such as wadi terracing and flash-flood dams, and the features used for collecting and directing runoff water. He thought that the creators of this elaborate systems had been the Nabataeans, a theory proved wrong by more recent studies, which dated the massive agricultural and demographic expansion in the area to the Byzantine period. The older explanation for the Tuleilat el-Anab, lit. 'grape mounds' phenomenon, has also been discarded: these large piles of rocks probably served two purposes: removing the rocks from the cultivated plots and accelerating the erosion and water transportation of topsoil from the runoff collection area onto those plots.

Along with Avdat (Oboda), Mamshit (Mampsis), Shivta (Sobata), Haluza (Elusa), and Nitzana (Nessana), the settlements at Rehovot-in-the-Negev/Ruheibeh (the second largest by population of the Byzantine-era "Negev towns") and Saadon are also significant for this period.

=== Decline; causes ===
A massive increase in grape production in the northwestern Negev for the requirements of the wine industry was noted for the early 6th century, documented by studying ancient refuse mounds at Shivta, Elusa and Nessana. There is a sharp peak in the presence of grape pips and broken "Gaza jars" used to export wine and other Levantine goods from the port of Gaza (see "Gaza wine"), after a slower increase during the fourth and fifth centuries, and followed in the mid-6th century by a sudden decrease. This was when two major calamities struck the Byzantine Empire and large parts of the world: the Late Antique Little Ice Age (536-545), caused by huge volcanic eruptions in the world, with the resulting extreme weather events of 535–536; and in the 540s the first outbreak of bubonic plague in the Old World, known as the Justinianic Plague. It seems likely that these two events resulted in a near-cessation of international trade with luxury goods such as Gaza wine, grape production in the Negev settlements again giving way to subsistence farming focusing on barley and wheat. Repeated earthquakes hit the region during the Byzantine period, with numerous revetment walls added to buildings to support them against collapse; a large 7th-century seismic event led to the abandonement of Avdat and Rehovot-in-the-Negev.

This recent analysis of newly obtained data has proved the previously widely accepted theory wrong, namely that the Muslim conquest, which occurred a century after these events, and specifically the Muslim ban on alcoholic beverages, was the cause of the decline of the wine industry in the Negev. In Nessana, the number of grape pips is even seen to increase again during the Early Islamic period, probably due to the needs of a local Christian monastery.

This disappearance of the wine industry from the semi-arid northern Negev shows that it was technically possible to sustain it over centuries, but that the grape monoculture was economically unsustainable in the long run due to its dependence on empire-wide trading networks, which required stability and prosperity over a vast territory.

=== Early and Middle Islamic periods ===
The southern Negev saw a flourishing of economic activity during the 8th to 10th or 11th centuries. Six Islamic settlements have been found in the vicinity of modern Eilat, along with copper and gold mines and stone quarries, a sophisticated irrigation system and road network. The economic centre was the port of Ayla (Aqaba).

=== 10th–19th century Bedouins ===
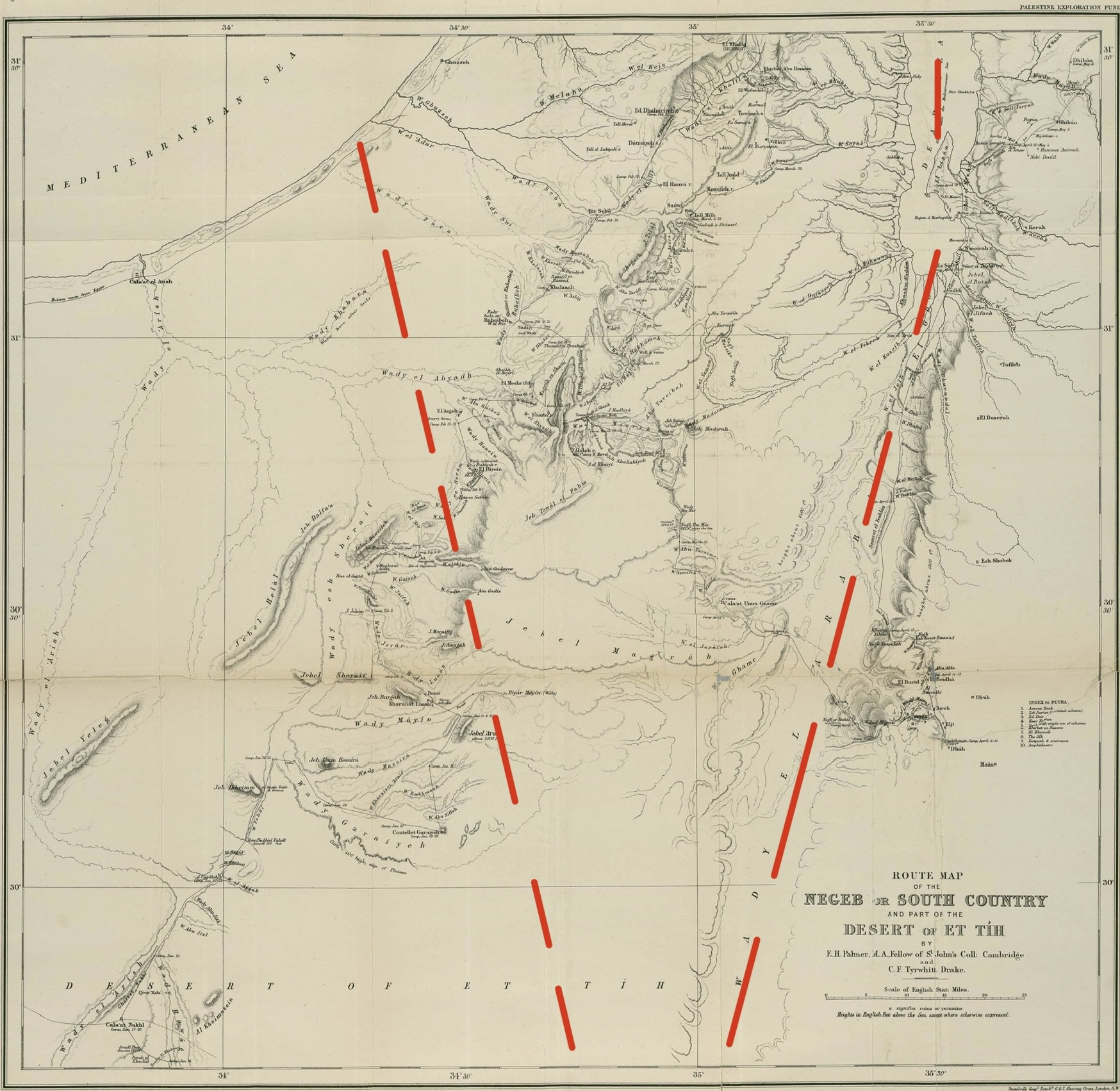
In 1871, the first scientifically accurate map of the Negev by E. H. Palmer was published in conjunction with the Ordnance Survey of Palestine and the Palestine Exploration Fund. The red dotted lines have been overlaid to show the modern borders that apply today.

Nomadic tribes ruled the Negev largely independently and with a relative lack of interference for the next thousand years. What is known of this time is largely derived from oral histories and folk tales of tribes from the Wadi Musa and Petra areas in present-day Jordan. The Bedouins of the Negev historically survived chiefly on sheep and goat husbandry. Scarcity of water and of permanent pastoral land required them to move constantly. The Bedouin in years past established few permanent settlements, although some were built, leaving behind remnants of stone houses called 'baika.'

=== Late Ottoman period (1900–1917) ===
In 1900, the Ottoman Empire established an administrative centre for southern Syria at Beersheba including schools and a railway station. The authority of the tribal chiefs over the region was recognised by the Ottomans. A railway connected it to the port of Rafah. In 1914, the Ottoman authorities estimated the nomadic population at 55,000.

=== British Mandate ===
The Negev was added to the proposed area of Mandatory Palestine, of which large parts later became Israel, on 10 July 1922, having been conceded by British representative St John Philby "in Trans-Jordan's name". (Note: Biger described this meeting as follows: "Sovereignty over the Arava, from the south of the Dead Sea to Aqaba, was also discussed. Philby agreed, in Trans-Jordan's name, to give up the western bank of Wadi Arava (and thus all of the Negev area). Nevertheless, a precise borderline was still not determined along the territories of Palestine and Trans-Jordan. Philby's relinquishment of the Negev was necessary, because the future of this area was uncertain. In a discussion regarding the southern boundary, the Egyptian aspiration to acquire the Negev area was presented. On the other hand the southern part of Palestine belonged, according to one of the versions, to the sanjak (district) of Ma'an within the vilayet (province) of Hejaz. King Hussein of Hijaz demanded to receive this area after claiming that a transfer action, to add it to the vilayet of Syria (A-Sham) was supposed to be done in 1908. It is not clear whether this action was completed. Philby claimed that Emir Abdullah had his father's permission to negotiate over the future of the sanjak of Ma'an, which was actually ruled by him, and that he could therefore 'afford to concede' the area west of the Arava in favour of Palestine. This concession was made following British pressure and against the background of the demands of the Zionist Organization for direct contact between Palestine and the Red Sea. It led to the inclusion of the Negev triangle in Palestine's territory, although this area was not considered as part of the country in the many centuries that preceded the British occupation.") Despite this, the region remained exclusively Arab until 1946; in response to the British Morrison–Grady Plan which would have allotted the area to an Arab state, the Jewish Agency enacted the 11 points in the Negev plan to begin Jewish settlement in the area. A year later, the United Nations Partition Plan for Palestine allotted a larger part of the area to the Jewish State which became Israel.

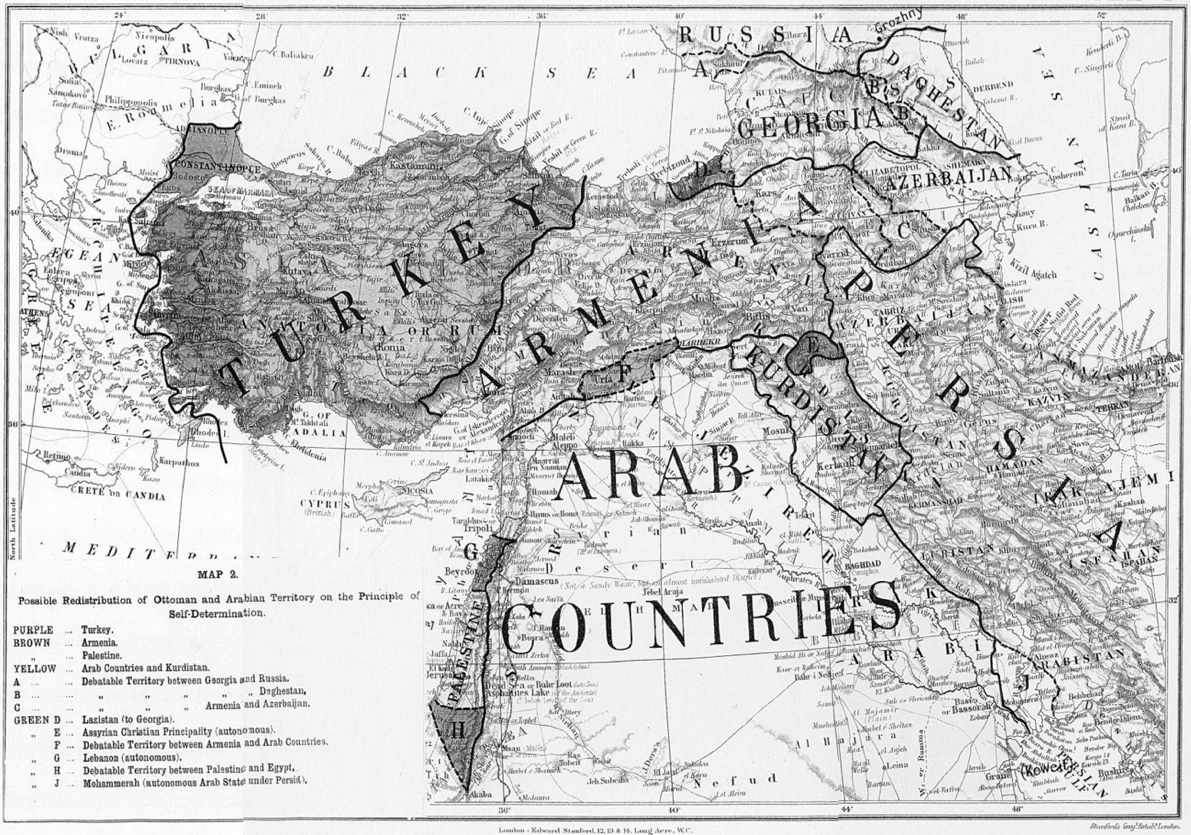
A map considered by the British Cabinet in 1918 suggested that the Negev could be included in either Palestine or Egypt.

The 1916 Sykes-Picot Agreement between Britain and France placed the Negev in Area B, "Arab state or states" under British patronage. The Negev was appropriated from the Ottoman army by British forces during 1917 and became part of Mandatory Palestine.

In 1922, the Bedouin component of the population was estimated at 72,898 out of a total of 75,254 for the Beersheba sub-district. The 1931 census estimated that the population of the Beersheba sub-district was 51,082. This large decrease was considered to be an artifact of incorrect enumeration methods used in 1922. An Arabic history of tribes around Beersheba, published in 1934 records 23 tribal groups.

=== State of Israel ===
Most of the Negev was earmarked by the November 1947 UN Partition Plan for the future Jewish state. During the 1947–49 War of Independence, Israel secured its sovereignty over the Negev. In the early years of the state, it absorbed many of the Jewish refugees from Arab countries, with the Israeli government setting up many development towns, such as Arad, Sderot and Netivot. Since then, the Negev has also become home to many of the Israel Defense Forces' major bases – a process accelerating in the past two decades, especially following the October 7 attacks. The region has also been a major focus for solar and renewable energy projects.

== Demography ==
With effect from 2010, the Negev was home to some 630,000 people, or 8.2% of Israel's population, even though it comprises over 55% of the country's area. 470,000 Negev residents (75% of the population) are Jews, while 160,000 or 25% are Bedouin. Of the Bedouin population (a demographic with a semi-nomadic tradition), 50% live in unrecognized villages, and 50% live in towns built for them by the Israeli government between the 1960s and 1980s; the largest of these is Rahat. It was projected that the Beersheba metropolitan area would reach a population of 1 million by 2020, and Arad, Yeruham, and Dimona would triple in size by 2025. While it is thought to have reached this mark as of 2026, Israeli censuses do not track a unified population count for the region, instead relying on its administrative divisions for population counts. The Southern District, which includes areas outside the Negev, encompasses most of the region.

=== Bedouin ===
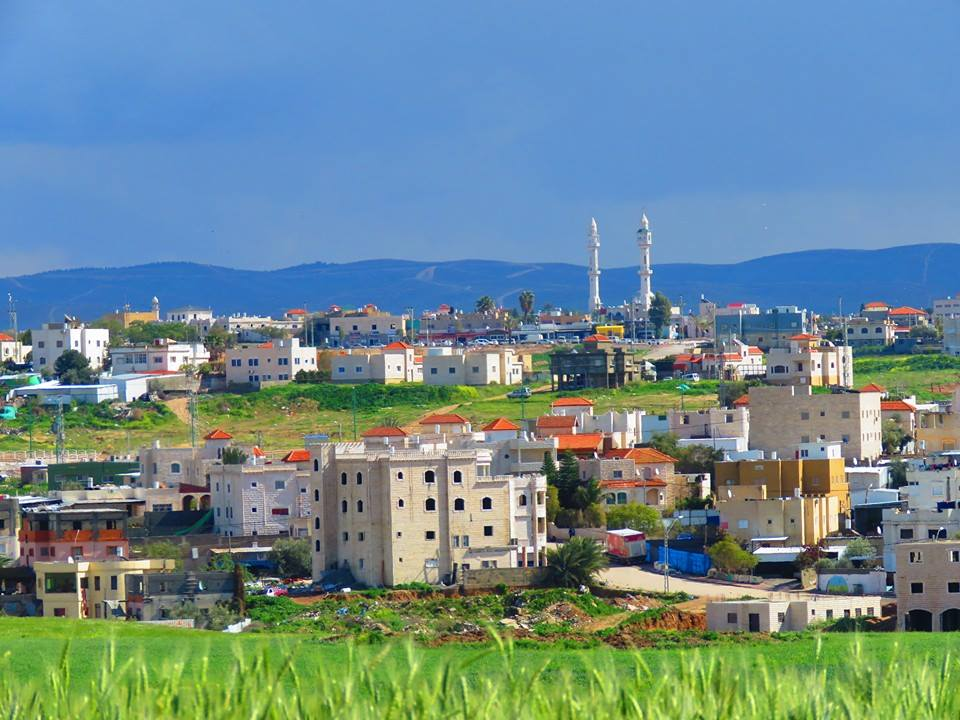
Rahat, the largest Bedouin city in the Negev

A large part of the Negev Bedouins inhabit small communities or villages. Israel has refused to recognise certain Bedouin villages that were founded after the establishment of the state. Under Israel's 2011-adopted and enacted Begin-Prawer plan – officially the Bill on the Arrangement of Bedouin Settlement in the Negev – some Bedouins are being moved to newly created townships. Bedouin villages established without proper sanction after establishment of the state are illegal under Israeli law. They are consequently destroyed or threatened with destruction. An Israeli court ruling in 2017 forced six residents to pay the cost of eight rounds of demolition to the state.

== Economy and housing ==
=== Development plans ===
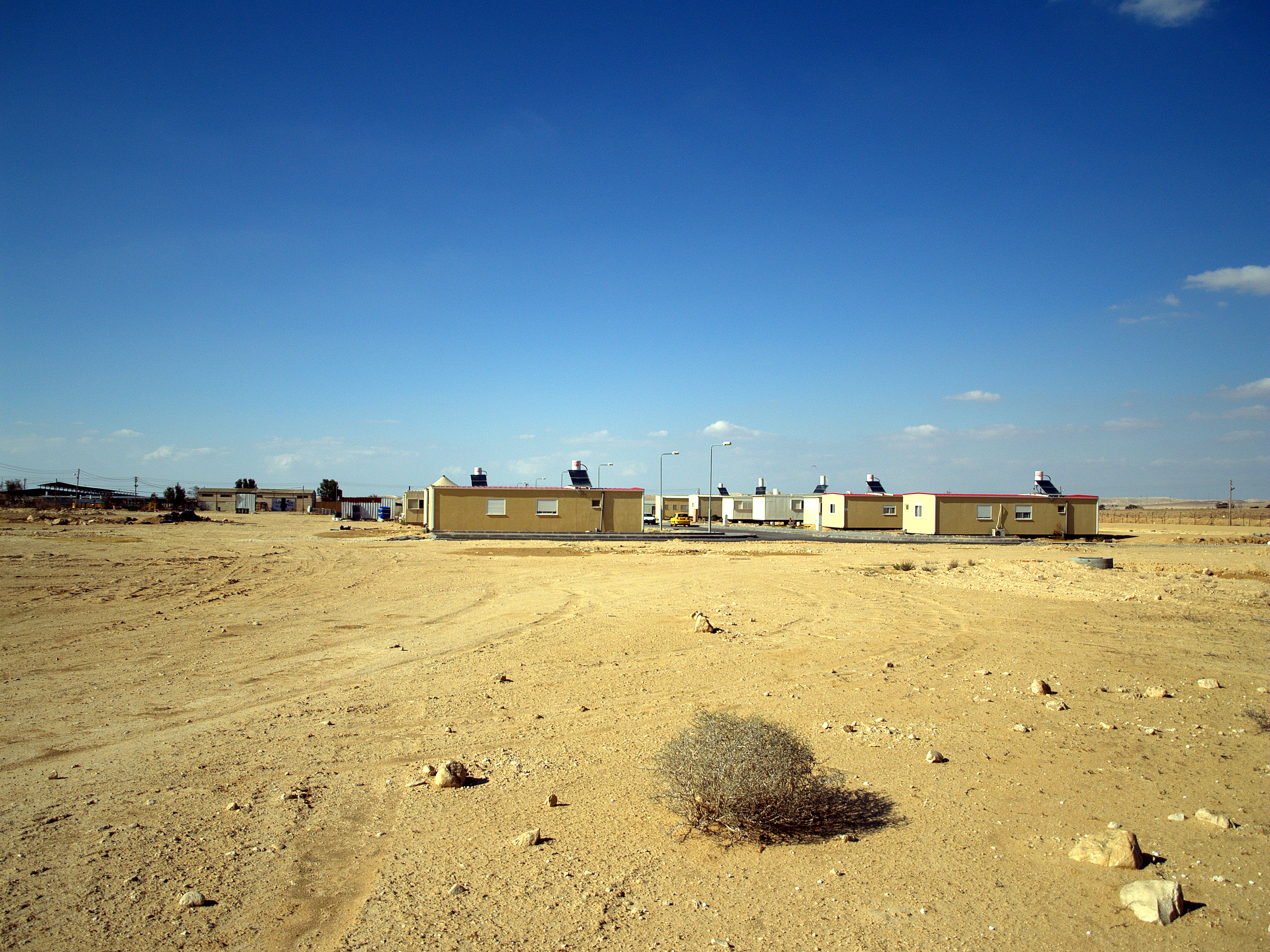
Blueprint Negev mobile homes, 2009

Blueprint Negev is a Jewish National Fund project introduced in 2005. The $600 million project is intended to attract 500,000 new Jewish residents to the Negev by improving transport infrastructure, establishing businesses, developing water resources and introducing programmes to protect the environment. A planned artificial desert river, swimming pools and golf courses raised concerns among environmentalists. Critics oppose those plans, calling instead for an inclusive plan for the green vitalisation of existing population centres, investment in Bedouin villages, a clean-up of toxic industries and development of job options for the unemployed.

=== Solar power ===
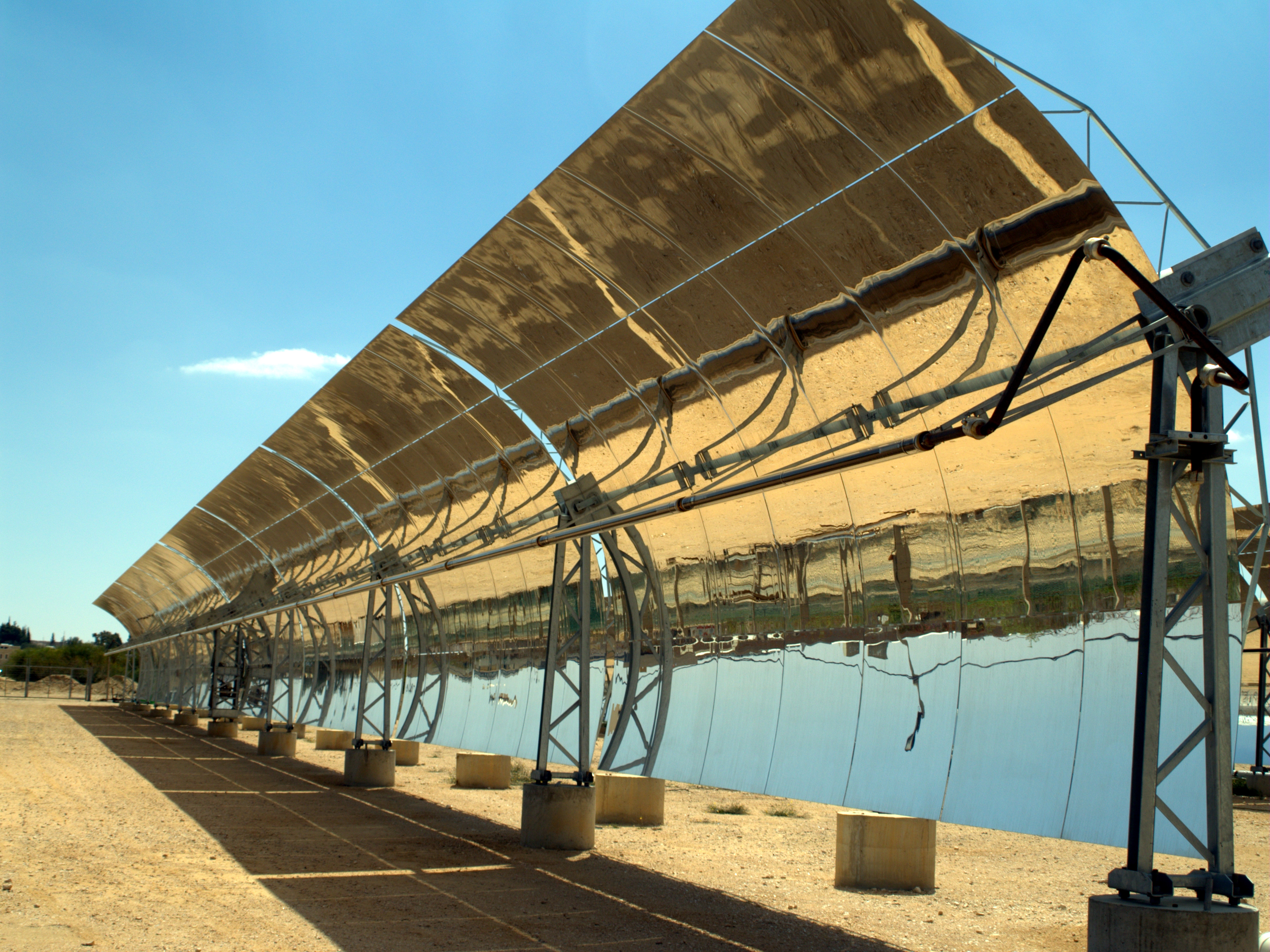
Solar troughs in the Negev

The Negev Desert and the surrounding area, including the Arava Valley, are the sunniest parts of Israel and little of this land is arable, which is why it has become the centre of the Israeli solar industry. David Faiman, an expert on solar energy, is of the opinion that Israel's future energy requirements could be met by building solar energy plants in the Negev. As director of Ben-Gurion National Solar Energy Center, he operates one of the largest solar dishes in the world. Technically, however, the Arava is a separate desert with its own unique climate and ecology.

A 250 MW solar park in Ashalim, an area in the northern Negev, the Ashalim Power Station, produces 121 Megawatts of power, using solar mirrors and thermal water heating. It is currently the largest in Israel.

The Rotem Industrial Complex outside of Dimona, Israel, has dozens of solar mirrors that focus the sun's rays on a tower that in turn heats a water boiler to create steam, turning a turbine to create electricity. Luz II, Ltd., plans to use the solar array to test new technology for the three new solar plants to be built in California, USA for Pacific Gas and Electric Company.

=== Wineries ===
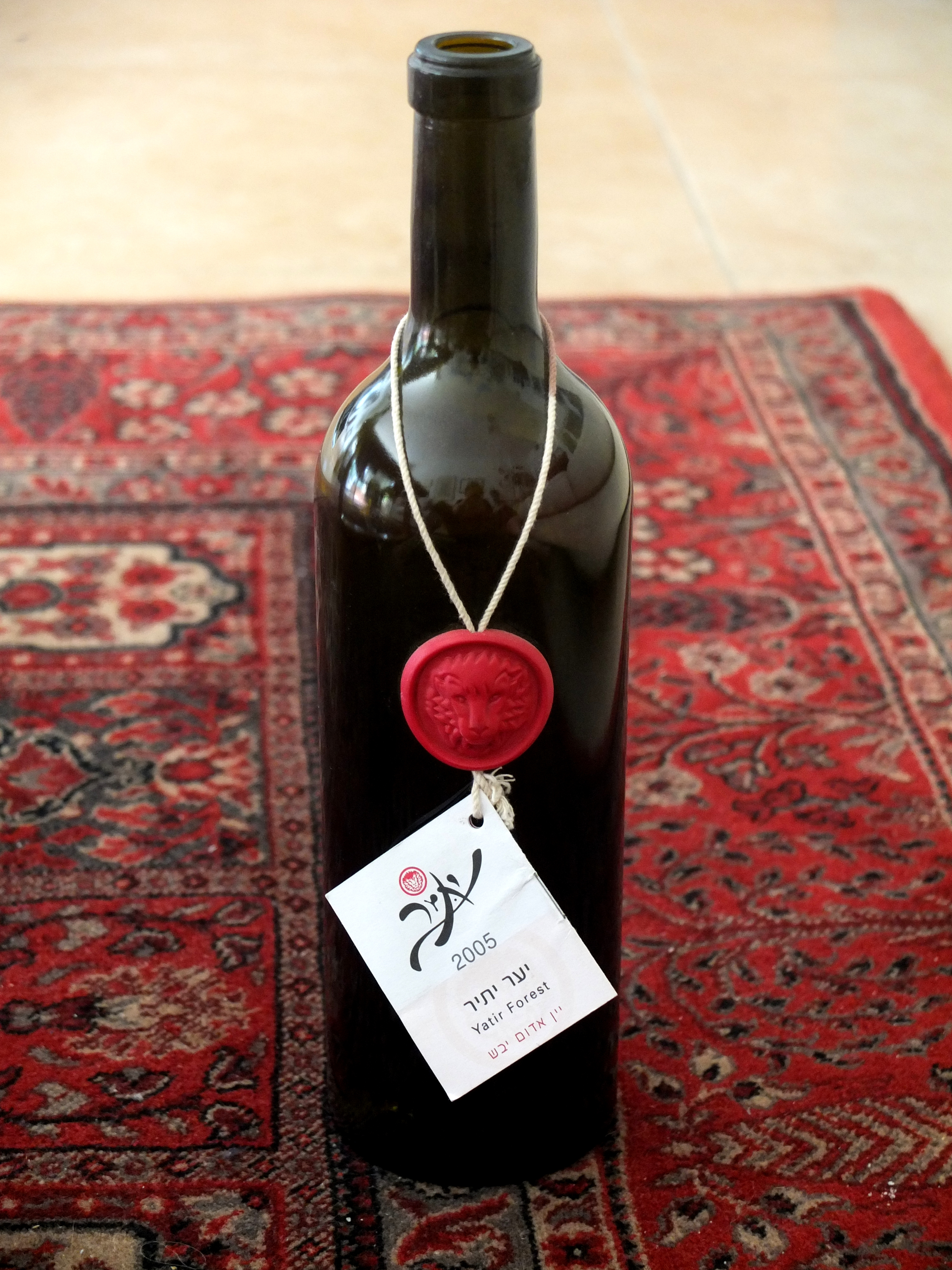
Yatir Forest 2005, produced by Yatir Winery in the Negev

Vines have been planted in the Negev since ancient times. In modern times, vineyards have been established in the northern Negev hills using innovative computerised irrigation methods. Carmel Winery was the first of the major wineries to plant vineyards in the Negev and operates a boutique winery at Ramat Arad. Tishbi has vineyards at Sde Boker and Barkan grows its grapes in Mitzpe Ramon. Yatir Winery is a winery in Tel Arad. Its vineyards are on a hill 900 metres above sea level on the outskirts of Yatir Forest. Carmey Avdat is Israel's first solar-powered winery.

== Environmental issues ==
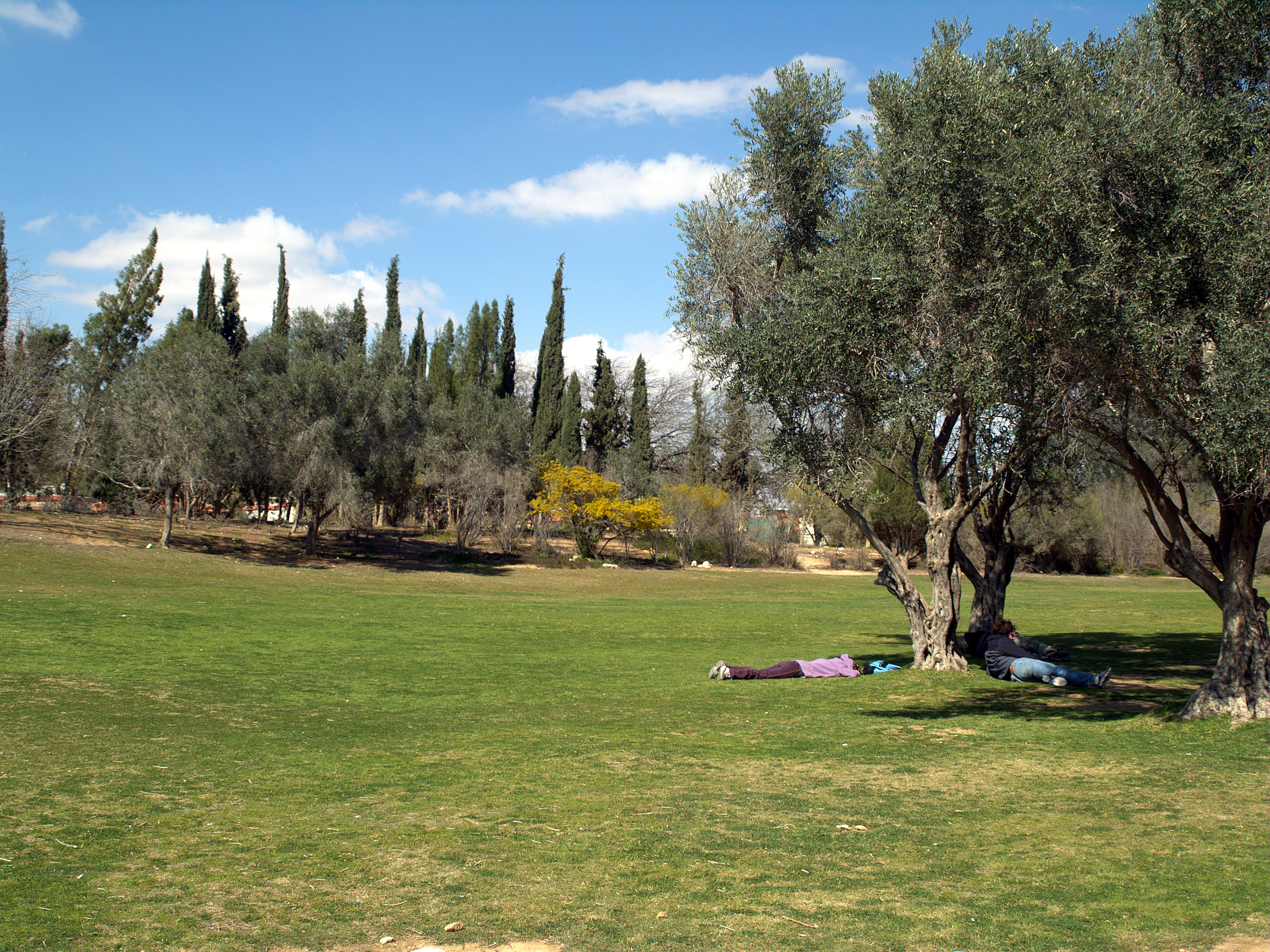
Campus of Midreshet Ben Gurion

The Negev is home to hazardous infrastructures that include Negev Nuclear Research Center nuclear reactor, 22 agrochemical and petrochemical factories, an oil terminal, closed military zones, quarries, a toxic waste incinerator at Ne'ot Hovav, cell towers, a power plant, several airports, a prison, and two rivers of open sewage.

In 2005, the Tel Aviv municipality was accused of dumping waste in the Negev at the Dudaim dump. The Manufacturers Association of Israel established an authority in 2005 to move 60 industrial enterprises active in the Tel Aviv region to the Negev.

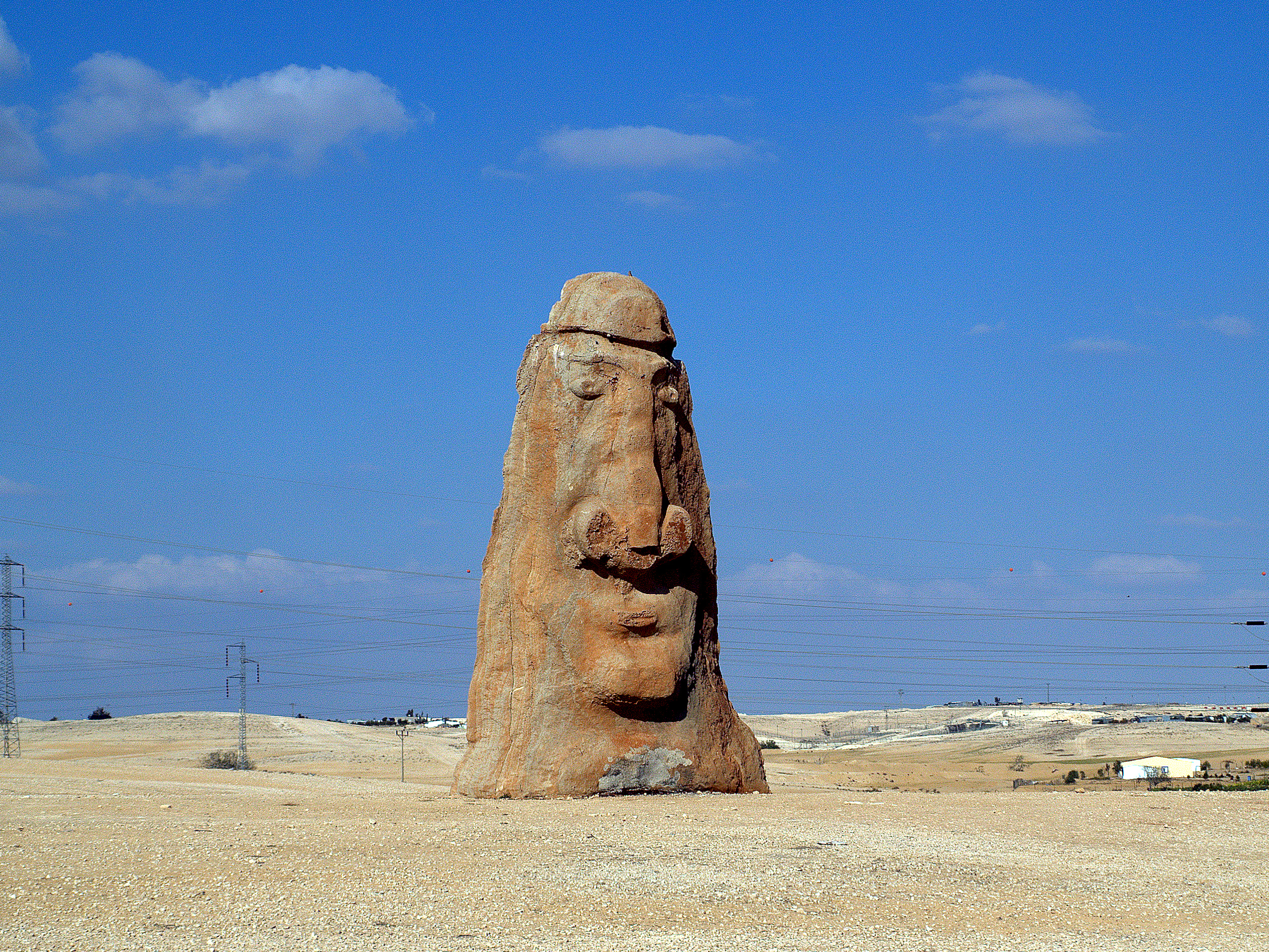
"Negev Guardian" (2005), 16 m tall environmental statue by Emilio Mogilner next to Ramat Hovav industrial zone, protesting against pollution

In 1979, the Ramat Hovav toxic waste facility was established in Wadi el-Na'am because the area was perceived as invulnerable to leakage. However, within a decade, cracks were found in the rock beneath Ramat Hovav. In 2004, the Israeli Ministry of Health released Ben Gurion University research findings describing the health problems in a 20 km (12 mi) vicinity of Ramat Hovav. The study, funded in large part by Ramat Hovav, found higher rates of cancer and mortality for the 350,000 people in the area. Prematurely released to the media by an unknown source, the preliminary study was publicly discredited; However, its final conclusions – that Bedouin and Jewish residents near Ramat Hovav are significantly more susceptible than the rest of the population to miscarriages, severe birth defects, and respiratory diseases – passed a peer review several months later.

== See also ==
- Caliche
- Negev Foundation
