= Carmel Winery =

Vineyard and winery in Israel

- Location: Rishon LeZion, Israel
- Coordinates: 32.5635°N 34.9573°E
- Wine region: Galilee
- Founded: 1882; 143 years ago
- Key people: Edmond James de Rothschild, founder
- Cases/yr: Over 1 million
- Other products: grape juice, olive oil
- Distribution: international
- Website: www.carmelwines.co.il

Carmel Winery (Hebrew: יקבי כרמל) is a vineyard and winery in Israel. Founded in 1882 by Edmond James de Rothschild, its products are exported to over 40 countries. It is the largest winery in Israel, with a local market share of almost 50%.

== Overview ==
Carmel Winery manufactures mainly wine, brandy and grape juice. It is the prime producer of wine in Israel, as it produces nearly half of the Israeli wine market, and one of the largest wine producers in the Eastern Mediterranean. It is the first and oldest exporter of wine, brandy and grape juice in the country, and also the largest producer of kosher wine in the world.

The company is owned by the council of the Vine-growers Union (75%) and the Jewish Agency for Israel (25%). Its parent company is Societe Cooperative Vigneronne des Grandes Caves Richon Le Zion & Zikhron Ya'akov Ltd. (S.C.V.)

The company holds the two largest wineries in Israel (Rishon Le Zion and Zichron Ya'acov), as well as two new smaller ones: Yatir Winery (50% ownership) and the Kayoumi Winery. In addition, the company owns 1,400 hectares (3,472 acres) of vineyards in Israel.

Carmel's production reaches 15 million bottles per year and its profit from export is US$5 million from 40 countries.

== History ==
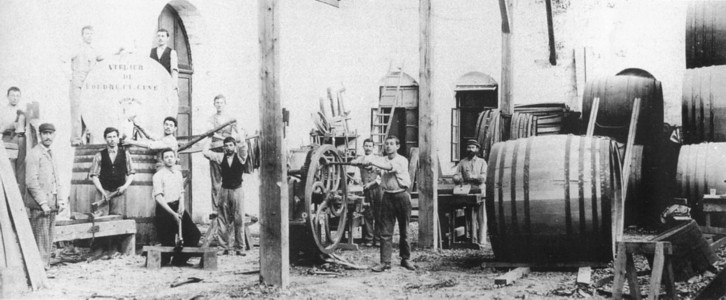
Building wine barrels in Zikhron Ya'akov, 1890s

When the settlers of the First Aliyah, Jews who immigrated to Ottoman Empire from Eastern Europe in the second half of the 19th century, encountered difficulties in cultivating the land due to their lack of experience and the soil's characteristics, they began to seek support outside of the Ottoman Empire for establishing vineyards and wineries. Their representatives visited France, where they met Baron Edmond de Rothschild, owner of Château Lafite. As a Zionist, Rothschild provided financial and moral assistance to the settlers. His first vineyards were planted near Rishon LeZion, south east of Jaffa. In 1882, French rootstock was imported, and the Baron sent his own wine specialists to advise the pioneers in this enterprise. Construction began on a large wine cellar in Rishon LeZion. Later, a second winery was established in Zikhron Ya'akov, situated on Mount Carmel just south of Haifa.

In 1895 Carmel Wine Co. was formed to export wines of Rishon LeZion and Zikhron Ya'akov, first in Poland, then in Austria, Great Britain and the United States. In 1902 Carmel Mizrahi was founded in The Ottoman Empire to market and distribute wines to the cities of the Ottoman Empire.

In 1896, the first Carmel wines were presented at the International Exhibition of Berlin at a special pavilion devoted to the industries of the Jewish colony in the Ottoman Empire. Over a hundred thousand people visited the exhibition, looked at the products, and drank a glass of Rishon LeZion wine. A year later, a world gardening exhibition was held in Hamburg where the settlers' wines were well received. Rishon LeZion wines won a gold medal at the Paris World's Fair in 1900.

In 1906, both the vineyards and the management of the two wineries were deeded to the winegrowers, forming the "Societé Cooperative Vigneronne des Grandes Caves, Richon le Zion and Zikhron Jacob Ltd."

Many of Israel's historical figures worked in the vineyards and in the wineries. Perhaps the two most famous were the first Prime Minister of Israel, David Ben-Gurion and his successor, Levi Eshkol.

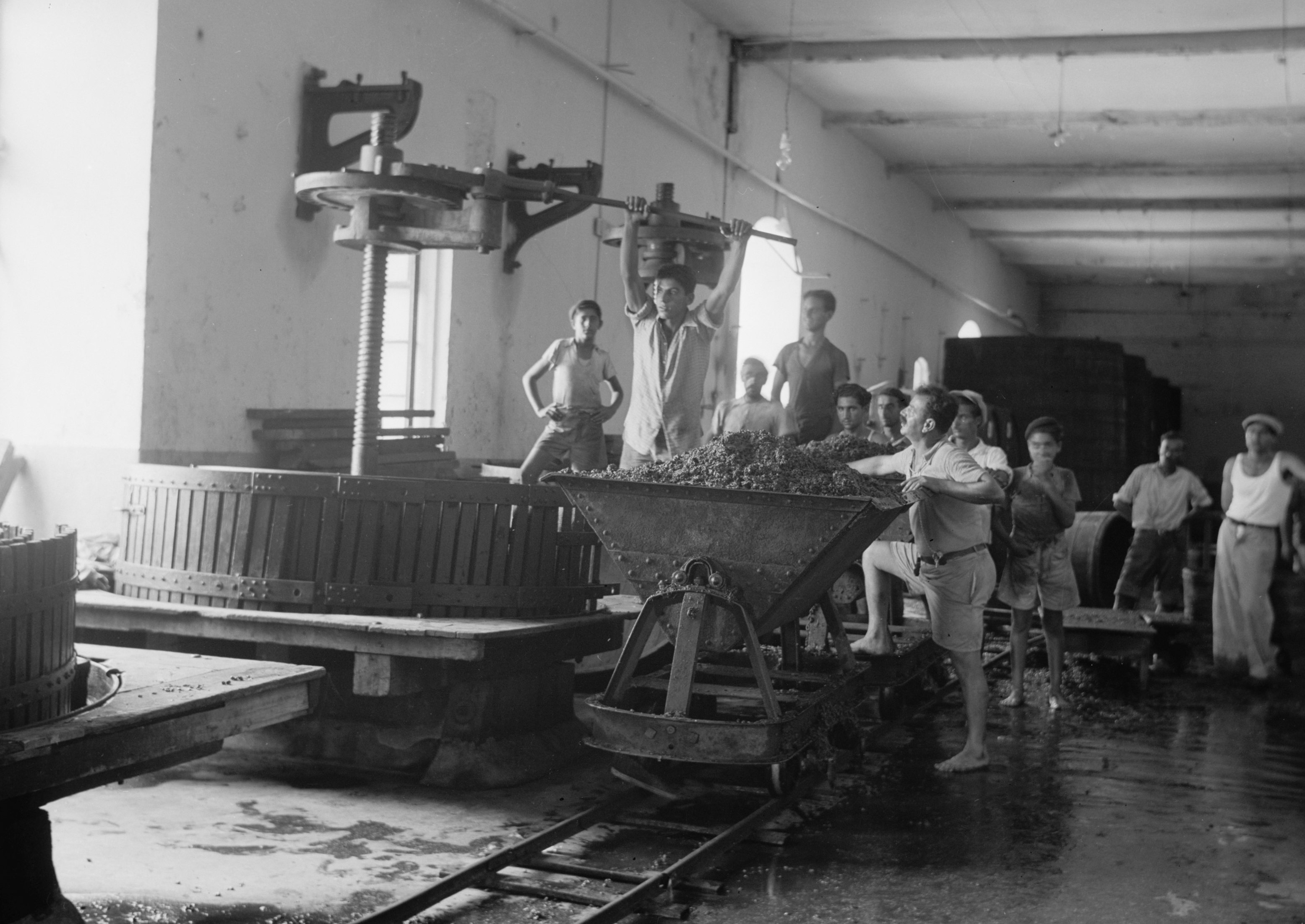
Wine making at Richon-le-Zion in August 1939 using narrow gauge trolleys for carting away pomace from the press

Through the early decades of the 20th century the wine business bloomed. Branches of Carmel Wine Co., were opened in Damascus, Cairo, Beirut, Berlin, London, Warsaw and Alexandria, and sales increased, particularly during the First World War, when allied troops passed through Palestine. However, the businesses fell sharply when the war was over. The industry lost its principal markets in Russia due to the October Revolution, in the United States because of Prohibition, and in Egypt and the Middle East because of Arab nationalism. Many of the vineyards were uprooted and replanted with citrus trees.

However, during the Second World War, the industry began to grow again and with successive waves of immigrants, drinking habits gradually changed. In 1957, the estate of the Baron Edmond de Rothschild deeded over the two wineries to the Cooperative of Winegrowers, the Societé Cooperative Vigneronne des Grandes Caves, by then, better known under the trade name Carmel Mizrahi in Israel and Carmel worldwide.

For some years after the end of the war, Carmel's output was focused on sweet wines used for sacramental purposes. However, with the emergence of the new world in wine making, Israeli wine makers sought new varieties of grapes, thus in 1971 Cabernet Sauvignon and Sauvignon Blanc, the first varietal wines from Israel, were presented in the United States market.

In the early 1980s, the wine industry in Israel fell upon hard times, but in the second half of the decade, wine became more popular and demands for quality stimulated tremendous improvements in the varieties of grapes being grown, the cultivation of new growing regions and the updating of fermentation and production techniques.

Over the past few years, new wineries have been built, the existing wineries have been renovated and a new team of wine makers have been employed.

In 2003 Carmel agreed to sponsor 'Carmel Trophy for Best Eastern Mediterranean Producer' at I.W.S.C. in London. In 2004 Peter Stern (formerly at Mondavi & Gallo) from California was appointed wine making consultant. The same year Carmel founded 'Handcrafted Wines of Israel'.

Exports are made to over 40 countries.

== Wineries ==
Carmel's first winery and head office is Rishon LeZion Winery, which is located in the city of Rishon LeZion. It was built in 1890 by Baron Edmond de Rothschild, making it the oldest industrial building in Israel still in use. The winery is the largest winery in Israel in terms of production of wines, spirits and grape juice. It was the first establishment in Israel to install electricity and telephone, and David Ben-Gurion, Israel's first prime minister, worked there. It underwent renovations in the 1990s.

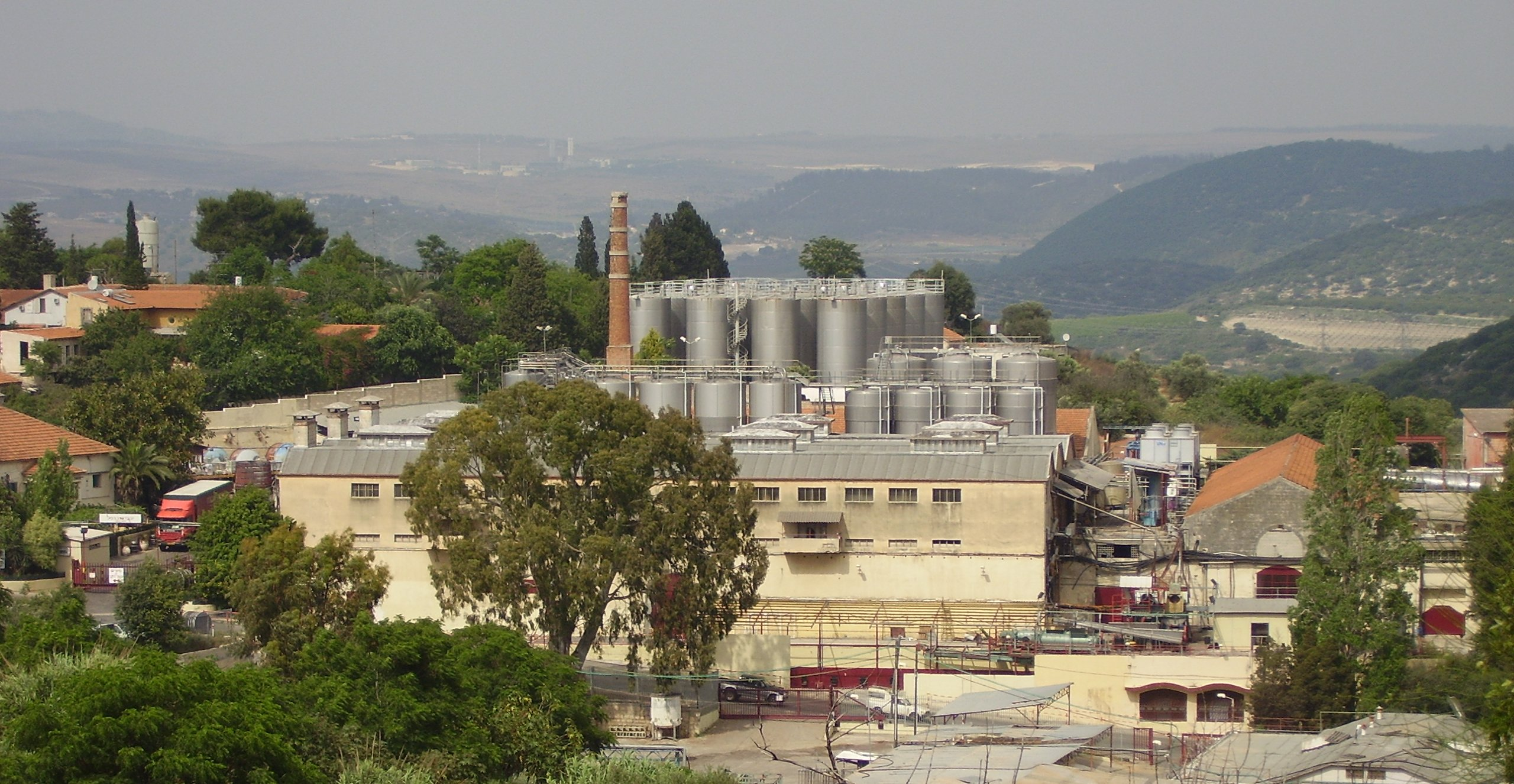
The Zichron Yaakov Winery

Carmel's second winery is Zikhron Ya'akov Winery. Located in Zikhron Ya'akov, it is used for production of wine and blending of olive oil. it was built in 1892, also by Baron Edmond de Rothschild. The winery is the largest winery in Israel in terms of grapes received at harvest. It includes a new winery built in 2003 and a pilot micro-winery for research and development.

Yatir Winery is a small winery built in 2000 which receives grapes only from its own vineyards. It is situated in Tel Arad, an archaeological site with 3,000 years of history, in the northeastern Negev. The winery was a joint venture between Carmel (50%) and Gadash local wine growers (50%). Yatir Winery is now solely owned by Carmel Winery. Its vineyards are located in Yatir Forest in the southern Judean Hills.

Another newly built winery is Ramat Dalton, located in Ramat Dalton, Upper Galilee. It was built in 2004 and receives its grapes from vineyards in Upper Galilee and Golan Heights.

== Vineyards ==
Carmel Winery owns numerous vineyards across Israel, from the Galilee and the Golan Heights in the North to the Negev in the South. These vineyards include some of the finest individual vineyard sites in the country. On average, Carmel harvests about 25,000 tonnes of grapes, which is approximately 50% of Israel's total harvest. Exported wines will show the growing region on the label.

In the Galilee and Golan, which are generally accepted as Israel's finest wine growing areas due to their higher altitude and cooler climate, Carmel's vineyards focus on growing quality grapes. Carmel has vineyards in the central and northern Golan and it is the leading winery presence in the premium Upper Galilee. The grapes from the finest vineyards go to Ramat Dalton Winery.

The coastal regions of Sharon and Central Coastal Plain are Israel's traditional grape growing areas, where Carmel's vines were originally planted. In the northern Sharon Plain, Israel's largest wine growing region, benefiting from Mount Carmel Range and from breezes off the Mediterranean Sea, Carmel owns extensive areas of vineyards. The main concentration of vineyards is in the valleys surrounding the winery towns of Zikhron Ya'akov and Binyamina. This is the largest region for Carmel which surrounds the Zikhron Ya'akov Winery. It was announced in early 2008 that a 150-acre (0.61 km^{2}) wine park would be created on the slopes between Zikhron Ya'akov and Binyamina in order to promote tourism in the area and wine tourism in Israel in general.

The Central Coastal Plain (known as Dan) and the rolling hills of the Judean Lowlands make up the second coastal region, in which grapes have been traditionally grown. This is the second largest area for growing vines in Israel, as it has a coastal Mediterranean climate: hot, humid summers and warm, mild winters. It is a large region for Carmel and it supplies the Rishon LeZion Winery.

In the Judean Hills, an area proved to yield grapes of high quality due to its warm days and cool nighttime temperature, Carmel has premium vineyards in Yatir Forest, the largest forest in Israel. These vineyards, which are up to 900 meters above sea level, supply grapes for the Yatir Winery.

Carmel is a pioneer in the Negev, a popular area for vine growing in ancient times, with its high quality Ramat Arad vineyard situated on the north east Negev plateau, 500 meters above sea level with very hot days and cold nights.
