= Negev Mountains =

Mountain range in Southern Israel

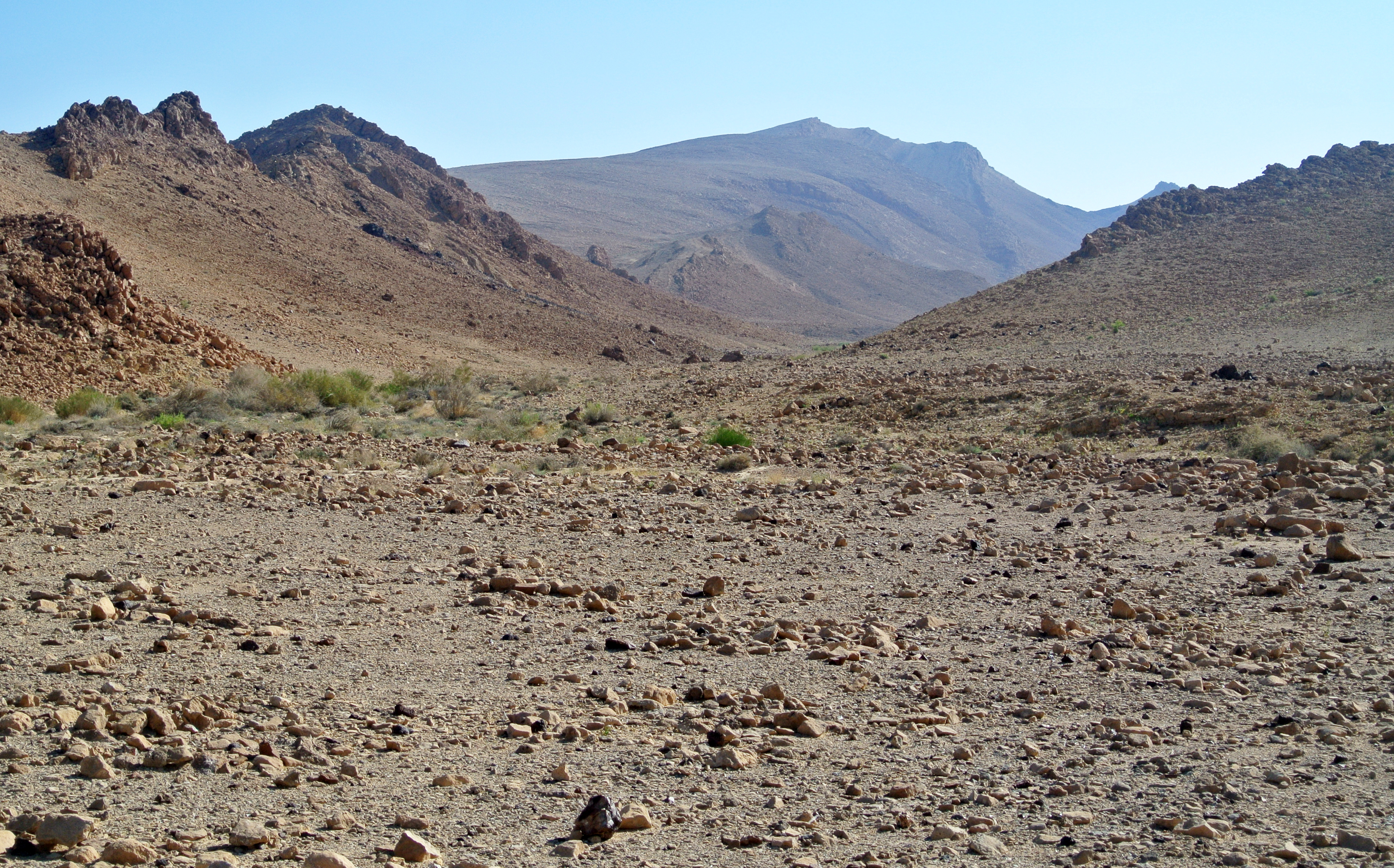
- Har 'Arif viewed from the east through the axis of the larger 'Arif makhtesh.

Highest point
- Peak: Mount Ramon
- Elevation: 1,037 m (3,402 ft)
- Coordinates: 30°30′10″N 34°38′21″E

Geography
- Location within Israel
- Country: Israel
- Nearby town: Mitzpe Ramon

The Negev Mountains (Hebrew: הר הנגב, romanized: Har HaNegev, lit. 'Negev Mountain' [singular]) is a mountainous area in the north-western part of the Negev desert in Israel and the northeastern Sinai Peninsula in Egypt. Mount Ramon is the summit of Negev Mountains and the highest point in southern Israel, reaching 1,037 metres (3,402 ft).

Most of the area belongs to Negev Mountains Nature Reserve, the largest reserve in Israel. Its area is about 1045000 dunams.

== List of peaks ==
List of peaks, sorted by height above sea level:

| Name (Eng.) | Name (Heb.) | Height (m a.s.l.) | Coordinates |
|---|---|---|---|
| Mount Haspas | הר חספס | 715 | 30°22′22″N 34°43′06″E |
| Mount Michael | הר מיכאל | 737 | 30°21′49″N 34°43′15″E |
| Mount Hason (Mount Strong/Mount of the strong/A strong Mountain) | הר חסון | 765 | 30°24′10″N 34°42′08″E |
| Mount Gavriel | הר גבריאל | 776 | 30°21′25″N 34°42′30″E |
| Mount Dela'at | הר דלעת | 781 | 30°17′49″N 34°41′33″E |
| Mount 'Aqrav (Lit:Mount Scorpion) | הר עקרב | 835 | 30°37′26″N 34°40′40″E |
| Mount Karkum | הר כרכום | 842 | 30°37′26″N 34°40′39″E |
| Mount Nafha | הר נפחה | 846 | 30°41′45″N 34°45′08″E |
| Mount 'Ayarim | הר עיירים | 860 | 30°36′46″N 34°35′57″E |
| Mount Arikha | הר אריכא | 863 | 30°39′09″N 34°46′52″E |
| Mount Batur | הר בתור | 896 | 30°24′01″N 34°37′24″E |
| Mount Hemet | הר חמת | 918 | 30°36′19″N 34°42′50″E |
| Mount HaMe'ara (Lit:Mountain of the Cave) | הר המערה | 922 | 30°25′49″N 34°34′24″E |
| Mount Gizron | הר גיזרון (גִזרון) | 926 | 30°34′51″N 34°36′36″E |
| Mount 'Arif | הר עריף | 956 | 30°25′33″N 34°44′02″E |
| Mount Sagi | הר שגיא | 996 | 30°21′02″N 34°38′19″E |
| Mount Harif | הר חריף | 1,012 | 30°29′48″N 34°33′34″E |
| Mount Lots | הר לוץ | 1,018 | 30°26′53″N 34°37′54″E |
| Mount Ramon | הר רמון | 1,037 | 30°30′10″N 34°38′21″E |
