= Yatir winery =

Israeli winery

Yatir Winery
- Location: Tel Arad, Israel
- Coordinates: 31°16′41.53″N 35°7′37.37″E
- Wine region: Negev desert
- Founded: 2000
- First vines planted: 1997
- First vintage: 2001
- Parent company: Carmel Winery
- Known for: Yatir Forest
- Distribution: international
- Website: yatirwinery.com/en/

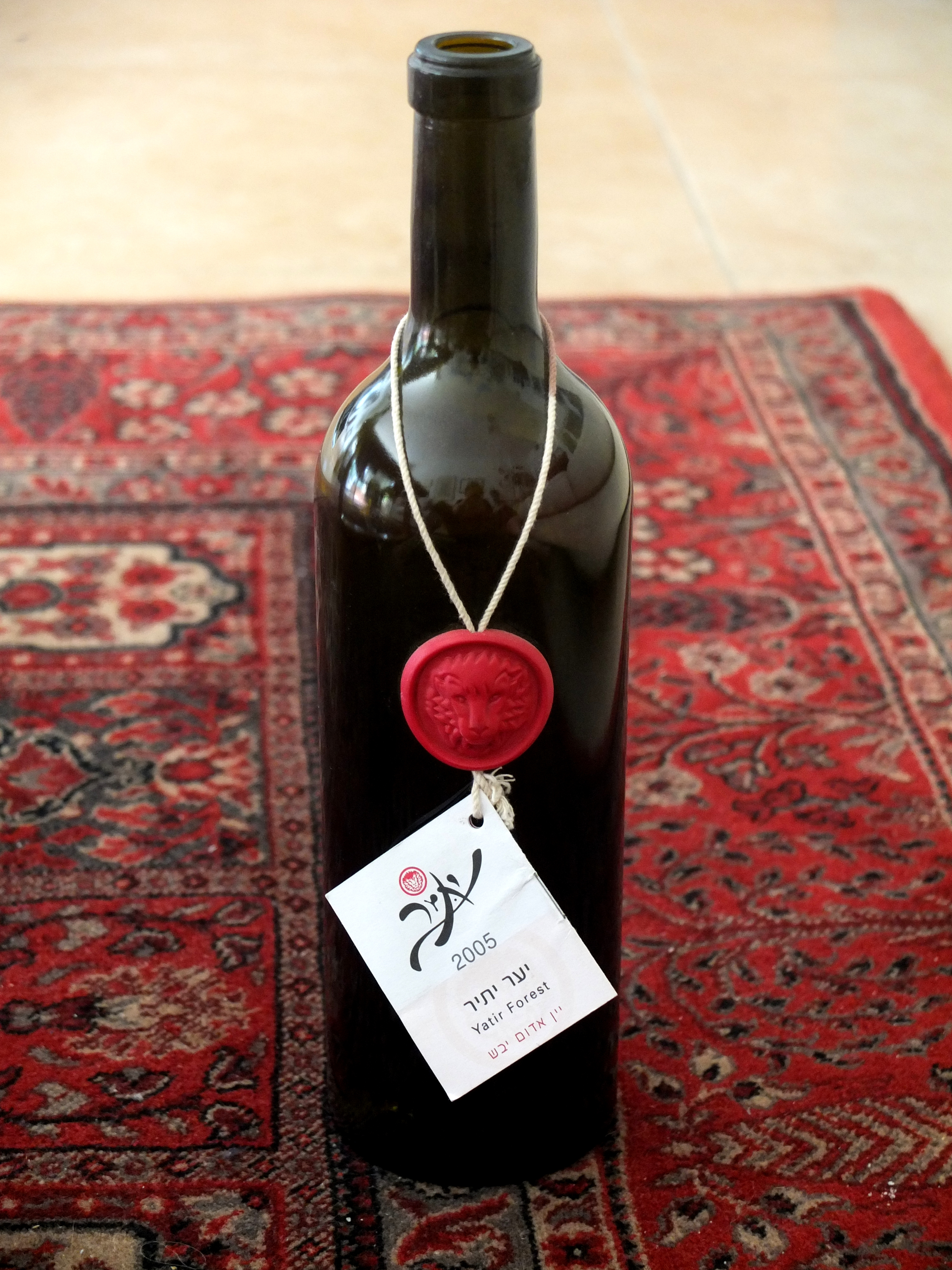
Bottle of Yatir Forest, 2005

Yatir Winery (Hebrew: יקב יתיר) is an Israeli winery in Tel Arad, Israel. Yatir’s vineyards are situated on a hill 900 meters above sea level on the outskirts of Yatir Forest.

Planting of the vineyards commenced in 1997. Eran Goldwasser, a graduate of the University of Adelaide, Australia, is the chief winemaker. The company is owned by Carmel Winery. As of 2012 annual production is about 150,000 bottles.

The winery began producing on two levels: Yatir and Yatir Forest, the latter being the winery's flagship series. In 2004, Yatir introduced a Sauvignon Blanc wine and the following year, a single-varietal Cabernet Sauvignon and Syrah. In 2006, it came out with a varietal Viognier.

Yatir's wine has received accolades from critics such as Robert Parker. It is the first Israeli wine to be listed in the main selection of Selfridges in London.

On the grounds of the winery, 180 ancient wine presses have been discovered

== See also ==
- Israeli wine
- Israeli cuisine
