= Dan Yakir =

Israeli ecophysiologist (born 1953)

- דן יקיר
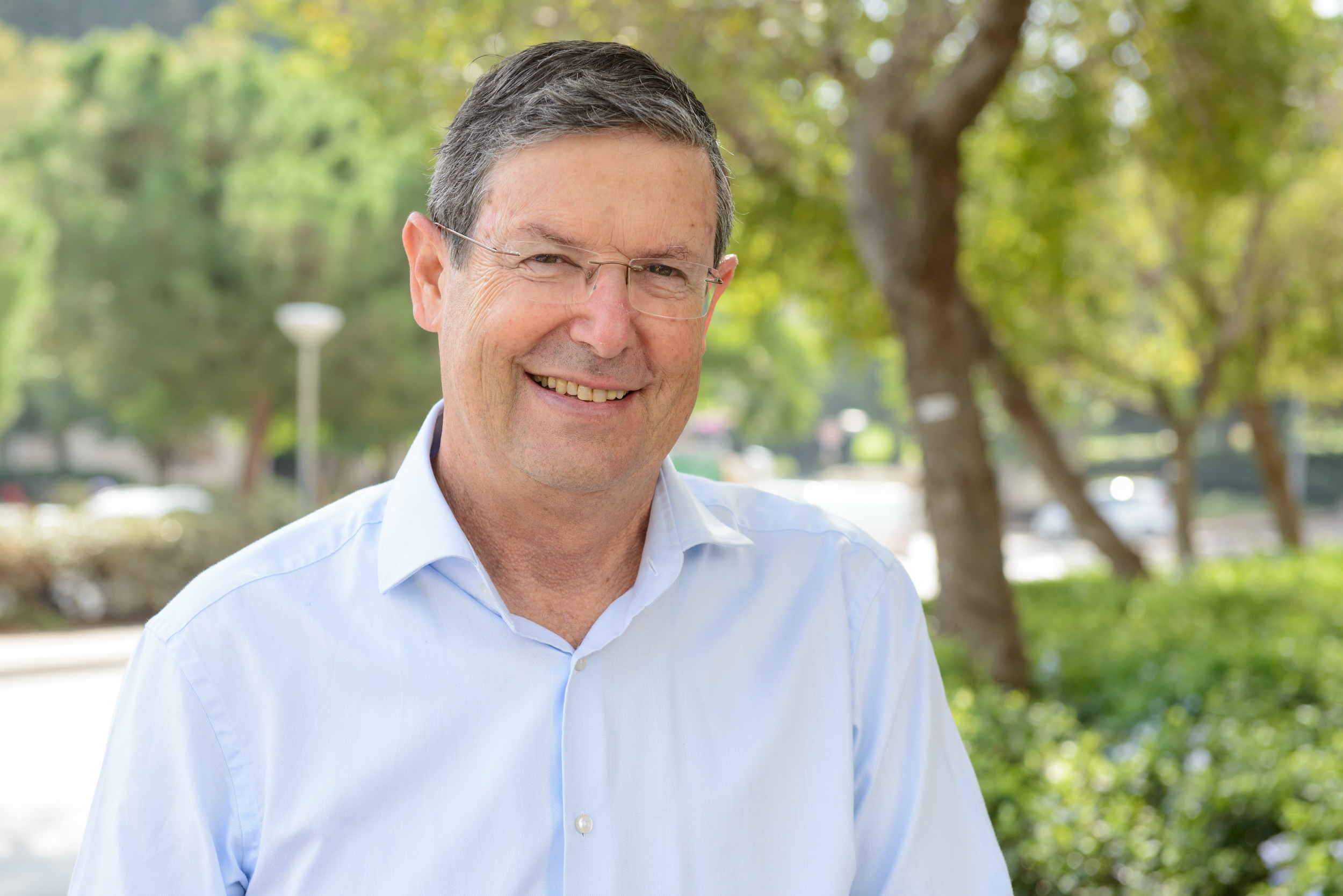
- Born: June 23, 1953 (age 73); Israel
- Education: Hebrew University of Jerusalem
- Known for: Study of Climate change in dry regions
- Awards: Israel Prize (2019)
- Scientific career
- Fields: Biogeochemistry
- Workplaces: Weizmann Institute

Dan Yakir (Hebrew: דן יקיר; born June 23, 1953) is an Israeli Ecophysiologist and a Professor in the Department of Earth and Planetary Sciences at the Weizmann Institute of Science. Yakir is a 2019 recipient of the Israel Prize for Research in Geology, Earth Sciences and Atmospheric Sciences.

== Biography ==
Dan Yakir was born in Netanya, Israel, to Dov Jancowarner, a tour guide, and Liora (née Bloch), a nurse who became a store owner. In the third grade of elementary school, he moved with his family to Nachlaot, Jerusalem. Starting in the ninth grade, he attended Kannot Agriculture Youth Village. In 1971, he enlisted in the Nahal with his fellow students from Kannot and helped the establishment of the Nahal settlement Ketura in the Arabah desert before taking part in the Yom Kippur War (October 1973) in the Sinai. Yakir earned a B.Sc. from the Faculty of Agriculture, Food and Environment at the Hebrew University of Jerusalem, where he continued to graduate studies and earned his Ph.D. in 1987. From 1987 to 1988, he pursued postdoctoral studies in Earth & Space Sciences at the University of California, Los Angeles, Followed in 1989–91 by research at Duke University and at the Carnegie Institution of Washington at Stanford University.

Yakir returned to Israel in 1991 and joined the Weizmann Institute as a Senior Scientist, where he established the Stable Isotopes Lab. In 2003, he was appointed full professor at the Weizmann Institute and holds the Hilda & Cecil Lewis Professorial Chair. He served as the chair of the Department of Environmental Sciences and Energy Research (now the Department of Earth and Planetary Sciences) from 2003 to 2009 and as the chair of the Weizmann Institute Council of Professors (2018–2020). In 1996–97, he was a senior fellow at the National Oceanic and Atmospheric Administration, Boulder, Colorado, in 2001-03, 2005, he was a Senior Visiting Scientist at the Columbia University, Biosphere 2, and in 2012, a Visiting Fellow, at the Cooperative Institute for Research in Environmental Sciences, Boulder, Colorado. In 2017, he was a visiting professor at the University of Innsbruck.

Yakir is the chairman of the Climate Change Committee of the Israel Academy of Sciences and Humanities, and a board member at the Arava Institute for Environmental Studies. He was a board member of the Davidson Institute of Science Education and vice-chair of The Israel Society of Ecological and Environmental Sciences. He also served on the scientific steering committee on 'isotopes in the hydrological system' of the International Atomic Energy Agency (IAEA), on the review panel of the Helmholtz Association of geochemical Research, and on the review panel of the French Alternative Energies and Atomic Energy Commission. He was a member of the Steering Committee of the International Geosphere-Biosphere Programme (IGBP) and its Integrated Land Ecosystem Process Study (ILEAPS) and was a board member at the Inter-University Institute of Marine Sciences (IUI), Eilat. He was an Associate Editor of the journals Plant, Cell & Environment and Oecologia, and Biogeosciences.

Yakir was awarded the Landau Prize for research in environmental sciences in 2006, the KKL Margarita Ravelo annual award in 2004, and the EAG Eminent Speaker Award (European Association of Geochemistry) in 2014.

== Research ==
Yakir was awarded the Israel Prize in 2019. In its arguments, the committee stated that Yakir deserves the prize for his contributions to the understanding of the interactions between the Biosphere and the Atmosphere. It stated that his most significant contribution was establishing the greenhouse gas measurement station in 1995 as part of the worldwide NOAA observational network and a research station he founded in Yatir Forest in 2000 as part of the worldwide FLUXNET sites. This research site helped to demonstrate the large carbon sequestration potential of semi-arid forests and a range of phenomena distinctive to the semi-arid environment. Yakir (together with his research group) was the first to show that the stable Isotopes of Carbon and Oxygen in Carbon dioxide (Carbon-13 and Oxygen-18) can be used in partitioning biosphere-atmosphere fluxes to their components. The linking of Carbon-13 and Oxygen-18 led to the discovery of a method to estimate the internal resistance to CO_{2} diffusion into leaves, a key uncertainty in modeling photosynthetic CO_{2} fluxes from the atmosphere. Using stable isotopes, Yakir demonstrated a link between the Carbon, Hydrological, and Oxygen cycles that help constrain the carbon cycle Later, he provided a “proof of concept” of using a new atmospheric tracer, carbonyl sulfide (COS), to estimate photosynthetic CO_{2} uptake at the ecosystem and global scales. Together with his colleague Dr. Rotenberg of the Weizmann Institute) they discovered the “convector effect,” by which Semi-arid forests sustain an extensive solar radiation load but maintain a low surface-to-air temperature difference by lowering the aerodynamic resistance to heat transfer and generating massive heat fluxes to the atmosphere. Using global-scale models, they showed that on a large scale, this mechanism provides a potential regional-scale climate modification tool. Using global-scale remote sensing studies, Yakir and his colleagues demonstrated that only “smart forestation” will help achieve climate cooling through forestation.

== Personal life ==
Dan Yakir is married to Hadas Yakir (née Lahav), lives in Rehovot and has three children.
