= Yatir Forest =

Forest in the Negev, Israel

Coordinates: 31°20′33″N 35°3′42″E

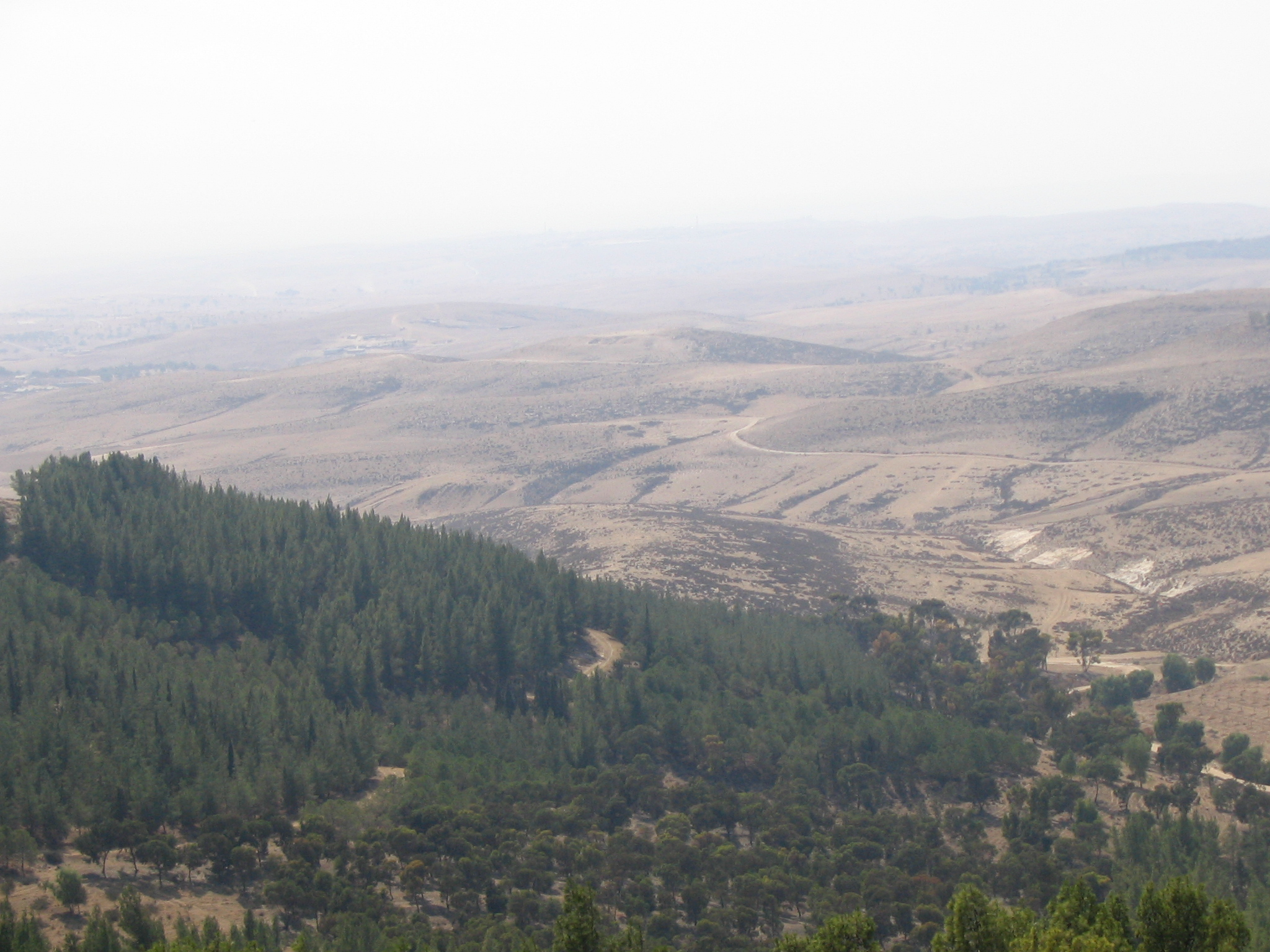
Yatir Forest on the edge of the Negev Desert

Yatir Forest (Hebrew: יער יתיר) is a forest in Israel on the edge of the Negev Desert. The forest covers an area of 30,000 dunams (30 km^{2} (7,413 acres)), and is the largest planted forest in Israel.

== History ==
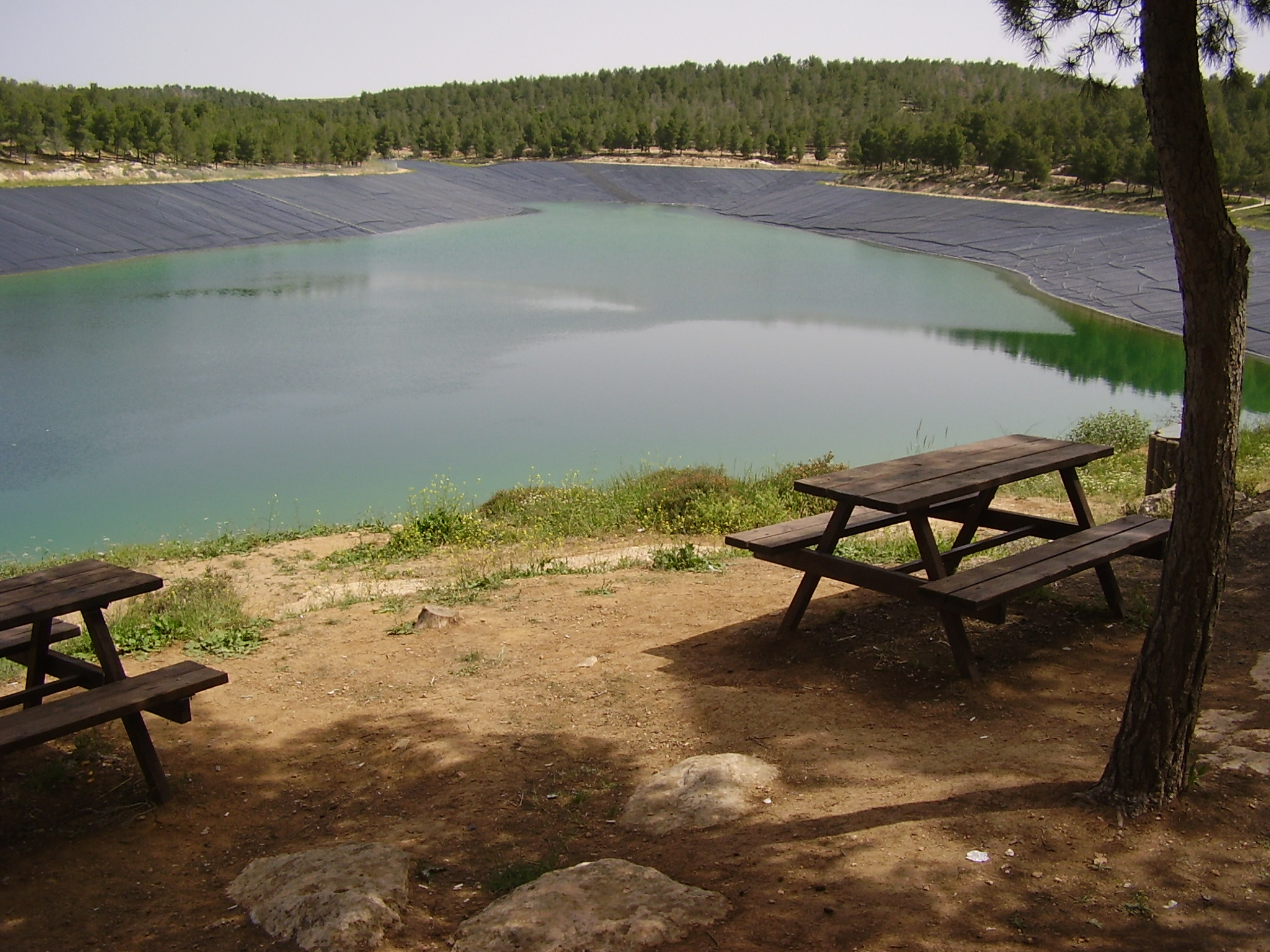
Yatir reservoir

The first trees were planted in 1964 by the Jewish National Fund at the initiative of Yosef Weitz. It is named after the ancient Levite city of Yatir.

Over four million trees have been planted, mostly coniferous trees - Aleppo pine and Mediterranean cypress, but also many broad-leaved trees such as Atlantic terebinth, tamarisk, jujube, carob, olive, fig, eucalyptus and acacia, as well as vineyards and various shrubs. Yatir Forest has changed the arid landscape of the northern Negev, despite the pessimism of many experts. It has proven to be a prime ecological instrument, halting the desertification on the heights northeast of Beersheba.

The forest is situated at a relatively high altitude (between 400–850 m (1,310–2,790 ft) above sea level) in a semi-arid region with an average yearly precipitation of 300–350 mm (12–14 in) and low humidity. The ground is composed of hard lime rocks, and soft chalk rocks.

The Israel National Trail, marked in 1991 runs through the forest. Yatir forest is located on the trail south of Meitar and north of Arad.

Yatir forest is the largest forest planted by the JNF, covering 30,000 dunams with over 4 million trees.

== Ecology research ==
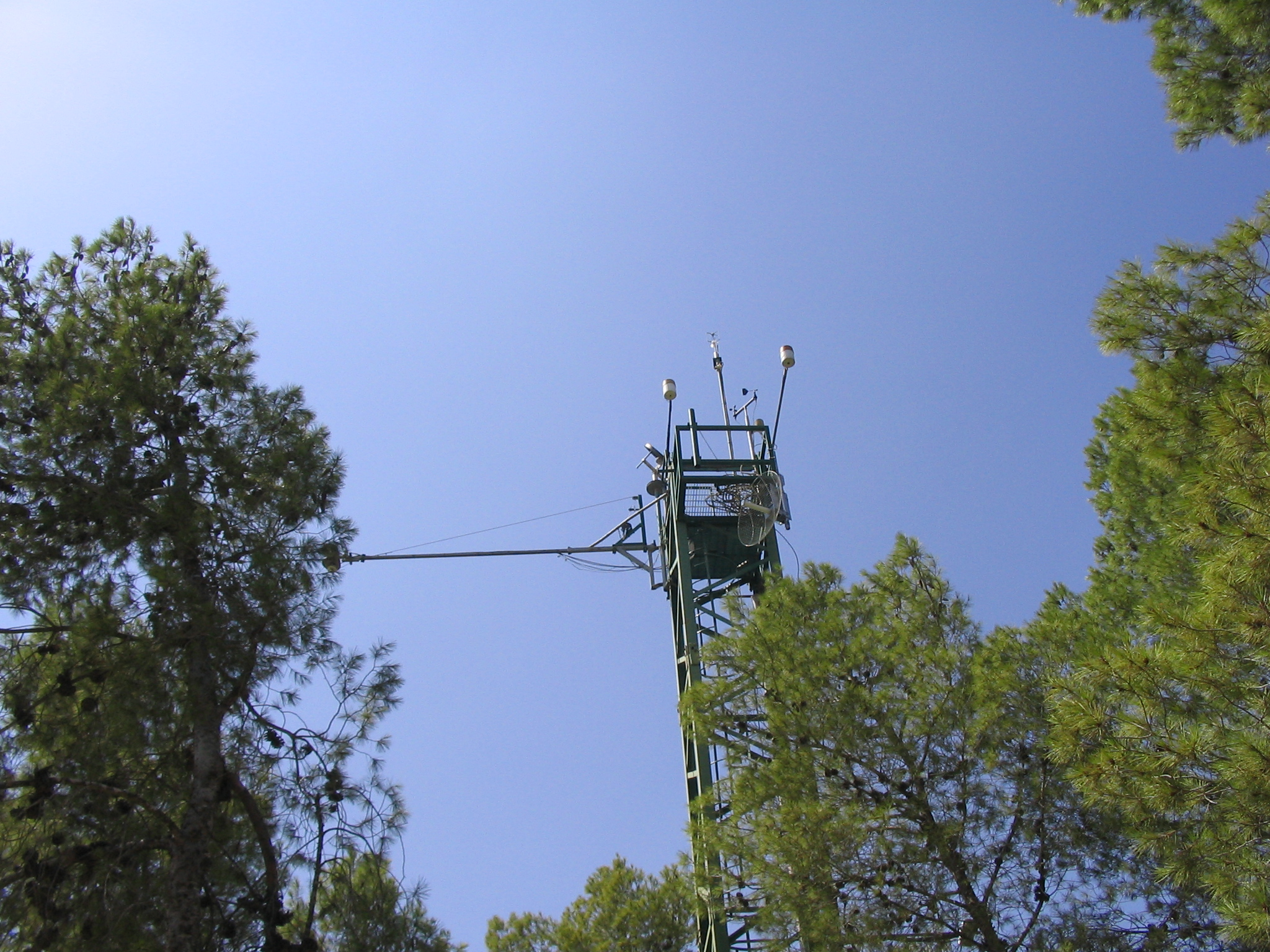
Weizmann Institute research tower

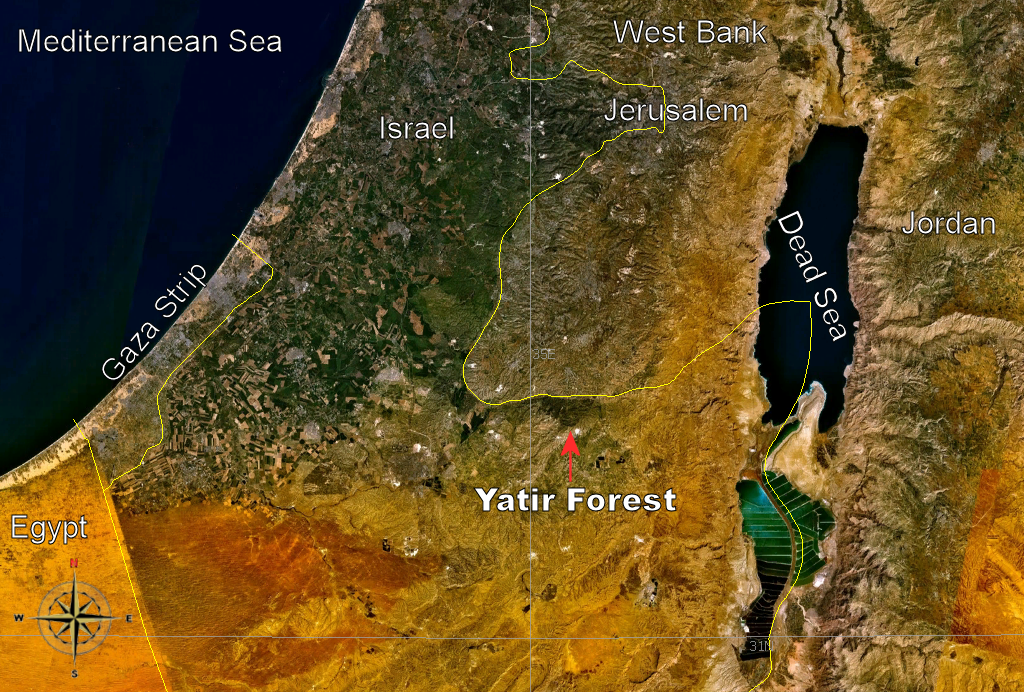
Location of Yatir Forest

Studies conducted in Yatir forest under the direction of Prof. Dan Yakir of the Weizmann Institute of Science, in collaboration with the Desert Research Institute at Sde Boker, have shown that the trees function as a trap for carbon in the air. Shade provided by trees planted in the desert also reduces evaporation of the sparse rainfall.

Yatir forest is also a part of the FLUXNET project, a global network of micrometeorological tower sites used to measure the exchanges of carbon dioxide, water vapor, and energy between terrestrial ecosystems and the atmosphere.

The Arava Institute for Environmental Studies conducts research at Yatir forest that focuses on crops such as dates and grapes grown in the vicinity of Yatir forest. The research is part of a project aimed at introducing new crops into arid and saline zones.

== Ecological herb and essential oil farm ==
The Yatir biological farm is located next to Yatir Forest near the village of Meitar, northeast of Beersheba and the Bedouin town of Hura. The farm is based on permaculture principles, and grows vegetables, fruits, olives and medical herbs. Medical tinctures and essential oils are produced from the herbs and wild plants harvested in the desert, in cooperation with Negev Bedouins.

== See also ==
- List of forests in Israel
- Jewish National Fund
- Yatir winery
- Agricultural research in Israel
- Science and technology in Israel
- Anim synagogue
- Agriculture in Israel
