= Mount Ramon =

Mountain in the Negev desert, Israel

Har Ramon
- הר רמון Rās Ramān, راس الرمان Rās ar-Rumān
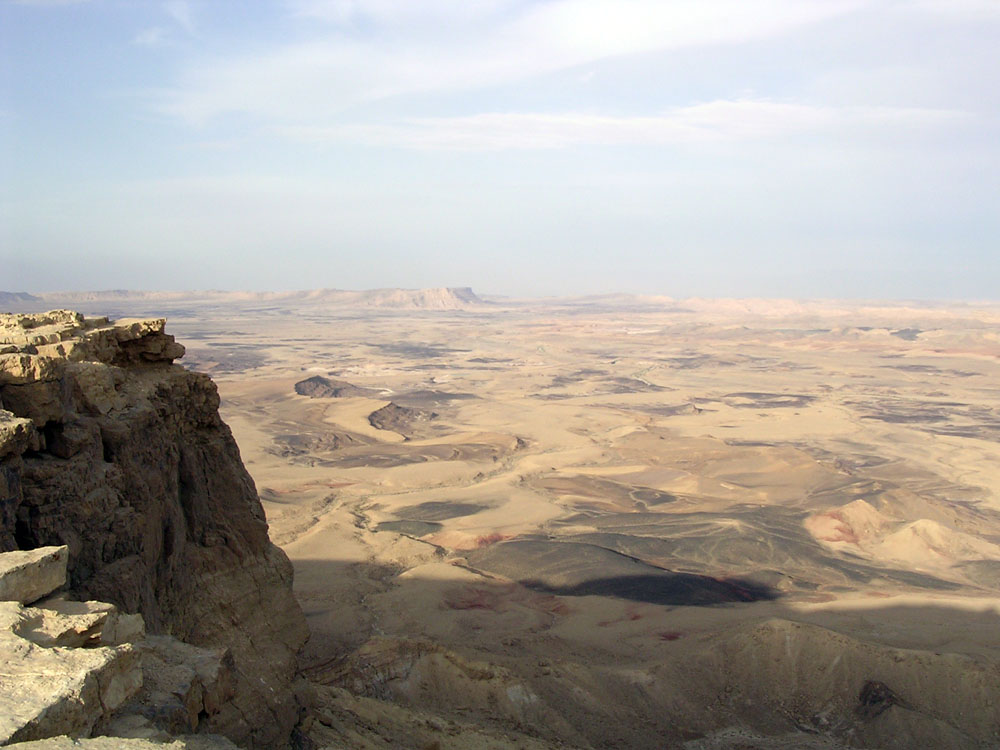

Highest point
- Elevation: 1,037 m (3,402 ft)
- Coordinates: 30°30′10.5″N 34°38′21.3″E

Geography
- Location within Israel
- Location: Negev, Israel
- Parent range: Negev Mountains

Mount Ramon, or Har Ramon, is a mountain in the Negev desert in Israel, near the Egyptian border and southwest of the well-known Ramon Crater. Its elevation is 1,037 metres (3,402 ft) above sea level and it is the summit of the Negev Mountains.

It is the highest mountain in the Southern District (Israel).
