= History of the Negev during the Mamluk and Ottoman periods =

Regional history of Palestine/Israel

During the seven centuries of Mamluk and Ottoman rule, the Negev was part of a broader territorial structure that linked it to regions east of the Jordan River and the rest of the Sinai Peninsula. These areas were populated almost exclusively by Bedouins, who maintained significant autonomy from the dominant powers in Palestine, leading the international community to widely recognize them as the indigenous people of the Negev. Only towards the late Ottoman period was the Negev separated from its surrounding cultural region and more fully integrated into the more northerly area of historic Palestine.

This period of relative continuity contrasts sharply with the immediately preceding Crusader period, when Europeans drove a wedge between the Bedouin territories west and east of the Jordan River, and with the subsequent British Mandate and Israeli periods, during which Western powers and immigrants dramatically reshaped Bedouin history by settling their tribal territories and expelling many Bedouins from the Negev.

However, interpretations of Negev history vary. Some contemporary scholars, particularly in Israel, have proposed that the region was largely uninhabited between the 12th and 18th centuries or was settled by different Bedouin tribes than those prominent in the 19th century. These interpretations, though still present in some discussions, are not widely supported by recent historical and archaeological evidence. Discussions of such narratives, as well as more detailed summaries of newer developments in the study of Negev history, have been relegated to footnotes where necessary.

== Antiquity to Crusader/Ayyubid period ==
=== Population ===
After the Idumaeans, the earlier inhabitants of the Negev, had advanced further into central Palestine in the 6th century BC, by the Persian period (from the late 6th century BC onwards) at the latest, Arabs had spread from east of the Jordan River as far west as the northern coast of the Sinai Peninsula. The same can be said for the Nabataeans, who followed these early Arabs and whose territory also extended from the area east of the Jordan to across the entire Sinai.

Between 63 BC and 106 AD, the Romans seized control over Palestine and the surrounding regions including the Negev. This, along with the Christian expansion in and into Palestine, ushered in a golden age for the northern and central Negev: Ultimately, the Nabataean desert towns in the central Negev evolved into large agricultural villages, and the entire central Negev was dotted with hundreds of smaller agricultural villages and farms.

From the 6th century onward, and increasingly following the Islamic expansion in the 7th century, Arab Bedouins began to settle primarily in the central and southern Negev. Concurrently, starting around this time and partly due to the Islamic expansion, the region underwent another transformation. By the 11th century, the desert towns gradually declined and with the migration of Christians to northern Palestine or back to Europe, the population of the Negev gradually arabized, ruralized, and nomadized. By the 12th century, the Negev had become a region inhabited solely by semi-nomadic and predominantly Muslim Bedouins.

=== Territory ===
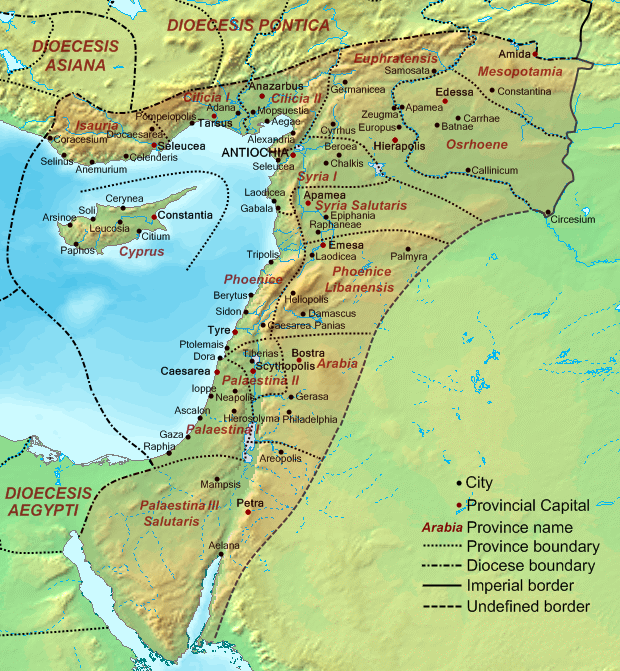
The Roman province "Palaestina Salutaris"

In accordance with the population distribution, both the Romans and the early Arabs organized the region territorially in such a way that the Negev was not grouped with Palestine, but rather with the rest of the Sinai Peninsula and parts of what is now southwestern Jordan and the northwestern Hejaz.

Instead of distinguishing between "Sinai" and "Negev" as would become common much later, the early Arabs rather differentiated in accordance with Biblical and Quranic interpretations: they referred to the major part of the Sinai and Negev as "Fahs al-Tih" (the "Area of the Wanderings [of the Israelites in Moses' time]") and to an area on the Sinai's northern coast as "al-Jifâr," which corresponded to the ancient Via Maris. Politically, both areas were usually considered part of Filastin.

Only during the Crusader period is there stronger evidence, albeit briefly, that the two regions — Negev and Sinai on one side of the Jordan and southern Jordan and northern Hejaz on the other — were temporarily separated from each other: The Europeans, who had colonized Palestine only down to a line from Deir al-Balah ("Darom") to Al-Karmil, had further expanded southward on the eastern side of the Jordan with the Kingdom of Oultrejourdain, thereby driving a wedge between these two territories. The status of the Negev and Sinai Peninsula during this time is less clear: Both were outside the European settlement areas and known to Europeans as "La Grande Berrie" (the "Great Desert"); however, whether this area was entirely outside the European domain or should be considered a vast border region remains uncertain.

Already the Ayyubids seem to have largely restored the old territorial order: Sometime around 1231 AD, when Oultrejourdain was under Ayyubid rule, Ernoul writes that in the north the River Jordan "divides the land of the Saracens and of the Christians, just as it runs," while in the south, for example, Mount Sinai "is in the land of the Lord of [east Jordanian] Crac [=Al-Karak]."

=== Tribes ===
It is certain that the Bedouin tribes whose presence in the Negev is confirmed by contemporary documents from the early Islamic period were predominantly not the same as the Bedouin tribes of modern times. There are some notable exceptions:

- The Bilī, from which the Zullam emerged. Today, the Bilī themselves are partly a sub-tribe of the Tiyaha confederation and partly living in northwestern Sinai.
- The Jerawin, of which some clans today form a sub-tribe of the Tiyaha and others a sub-tribe of the Tarabin confederation. Both of these tribes can be traced back to the pre-Islamic period.
- The main tribe of the Jabarat and
- the Banu Judham, from which the Bani 'Uqbah (see below) emerged (from which in turn the Huwaytat emerged), are attested in the region of Palestine since the early Islamic period.
- The Amarīn and
- the Rutaymat both descended from Palestinian village populations and later joined the Jabarat confederation.

However, these eight tribes account for only a small percentage of the 95 Negev Bedouin tribes documented during the Mandate period. The historical roots of several of the largest tribal confederations of modern times, on the other hand, seem to lie in the Mamluk period, during which a major tribal migration took place.

== Mamluk period (13th to early 16th century) ==
=== The Political Debate on Bedouin Presence in the Negev ===
Recently, the question of the historical presence of Bedouins in the Negev has turned into a politically contentious issue, because the Negev Bedouins are now recognized as "indigenous peoples" by the UN Human Rights Council, the UN Special Rapporteur on the Rights of Indigenous Peoples, and with a "near consensus" by the international community, as they are said to

[...] have inhabited the area known as Negev since the seventh century, maintaining a semi-nomadic lifestyle, engaging in subsistence farming and raising livestock. Their land use practices were governed by an intricate system of customary land and water distribution and management. [...] The Special Rapporteur considers there to be strong indications that Bedouin people have rights to certain areas of the Negev based on their longstanding land use and occupancy, under contemporary international standards. It is undisputed that the Bedouin have used and occupied lands within the Negev desert long before the establishment of the State of Israel and that they have continued through the present to inhabit the Negev, maintaining their culturally-distinctive land tenure and way of life.

— James Anaya, 2011

As a result, some scholars and organizations, particularly Israeli ones, have now begun to argue against the early or continuous presence of Bedouins in the Negev, asserting that the Bedouins are not "indigenous" and do not possess indigenous rights.

=== Archaeological Evidence and Interpretations of Bedouin Land Use in the Negev ===
Both versions can be supported by archaeology, as depending on the archaeological or historical method applied, historians come to two different conclusions regarding land use in the Negev during the Mamluk and early Ottoman periods:

(1) Classical archaeologists, who primarily rely on building remains and period-specific pottery to reconstruct the Negev's history, believe that Bedouins largely abandoned the Negev between the 12th and 16th/18th centuries, as typical Mamluk pottery ("Handmade Ware") is found almost exclusively in the northern Negev east of Rafah and in the eastern parts of the biblical Negev, while it is largely absent in the central and southern Negev, where only pottery typical of early Islamic period (e.g. "Cream Ware") and the Ottoman period ("Gaza Ware") appears.

However, the absence of building remains and pottery may not be surprising: contemporary pilgrims, who consistently reported large numbers of Bedouins in the Negev, also noted that they resided in tents rather than buildings. As for the absence of pottery, it remains uncertain whether early Bedouins would have used pottery in addition to waterskins, the use of which in the Negev is clearly attested by Felix Fabri, who wrote during the late Mamluk period.

In contrast, (2) recent archaeological research using newer methods as radiocarbon dating, luminescence dating, and landscape archaeology suggests that, in agreement with the testimonies of contemporary pilgrims and Bedouin oral history, significant numbers of Bedouins were still present also in the central and southern Negev and — unlike the Bedouins in the rest of the Sinai Peninsula, and contrary to earlier assumptions — "cultivated some of the best-preserved agricultural plots and primarily grew annual crops, such as cereals, and occasionally also managed small plots of fruit trees." For more detailed insights into these new archaeological findings, see the footnote. (Note: In detail: Recently, archaeology has analyzed old fruit trees still growing in the Negev highlands, proving that the old agricultural terraces in the Negev (→ Negev: Iron Age Agriculture; Negev: Byzantine Agriculture) were cultivated continuously over a period from more than 1,000 years ago until 70 years ago. Surprisingly, it was also found that the planters of these fruit trees did not build up the terraces as would be expected for optimal use. Therefore, OSL dating of terraces dating back to the Byzantine/Early Islamic period does not imply that the terraces were not used thereafter. Hence, the extent of the terrace's use after the Early Islamic period is unknown, but the use per se is proven.; Similarly, only recently, archaeologists have begun reconstructing the history of cisterns in the Negev highlands using OSL dating. This research also indicates Bedouin presence during the Mamluk period: some cisterns were first dug in the Middle Ages, while others were used and maintained during that time.; In the region around Ayla in the southern Negev, where terrace farming was not previously common and the early Islamic qanat system had been used for irrigation instead (the qanat system continued to be used until the 20th century), new terraces were built after the 11th century. The oldest terrace dated post-11th century was constructed between the 14th and 16th centuries, with the next one built in the 16th century, followed by several more in the 17th and 18th centuries. This suggests that in this driest region of Palestine, agriculture was expanded after the 11th century, especially from the 17th century onwards, but perhaps already starting with Mamluk period of the Burji sultanate (14th to 16th ct.). This aligns with a report by al-Jaziri (mid-16th century), according to which the Bedouin tribes of the Aheiwat and the Wuhaydat (see below) at that time grew some palm trees and cultivated several "gardens" in this region.; Ottoman tax registers from the 16th century list about 4,000 taxable Bedouins in the area of the northern Negev east of today's Gaza strip, among other Bedouins at more northerly places. This tax list clearly indicates that some Bedouins in Palestine were engaged in agriculture and nomadic livestock farming in the 16th century. However, for the Negev Bedouins, the records do not specify the types of taxes paid (such as barley tax, sheep tax, etc.). Accordingly, these tax entries could imply that Bedouins were engaged in agriculture in this most fertile region of the Negev during the 16th century; however, this is not certain from this register. Bedouin presence in this area during that time can also be archaeologically evidenced by a cemetery in Tell el-Hesi at the northern edge of the northern Negev, where Bedouins have buried their dead since the 16th century.)

=== Territorial history ===
==== National territories ====
Most contemporary sources consistently report that during the Mamluk period, the territorial organization of the Negev and Sinai was similar to that of the Roman era and to what Ernoul described for the Ayyubid period: the majority of the Sinai Peninsula, including the Negev, belonged to the East-Jordanian region of Karak. The Jifâr region, however, seems to have come under Egyptian rule shortly after al-Dimashqi (~1300), who was the last to include it within Karak: After al-Dimashqi, this became the "standard description of the Egyptian borders in the medieval Muslim/Arabic sources."

==== Tribal territories ====
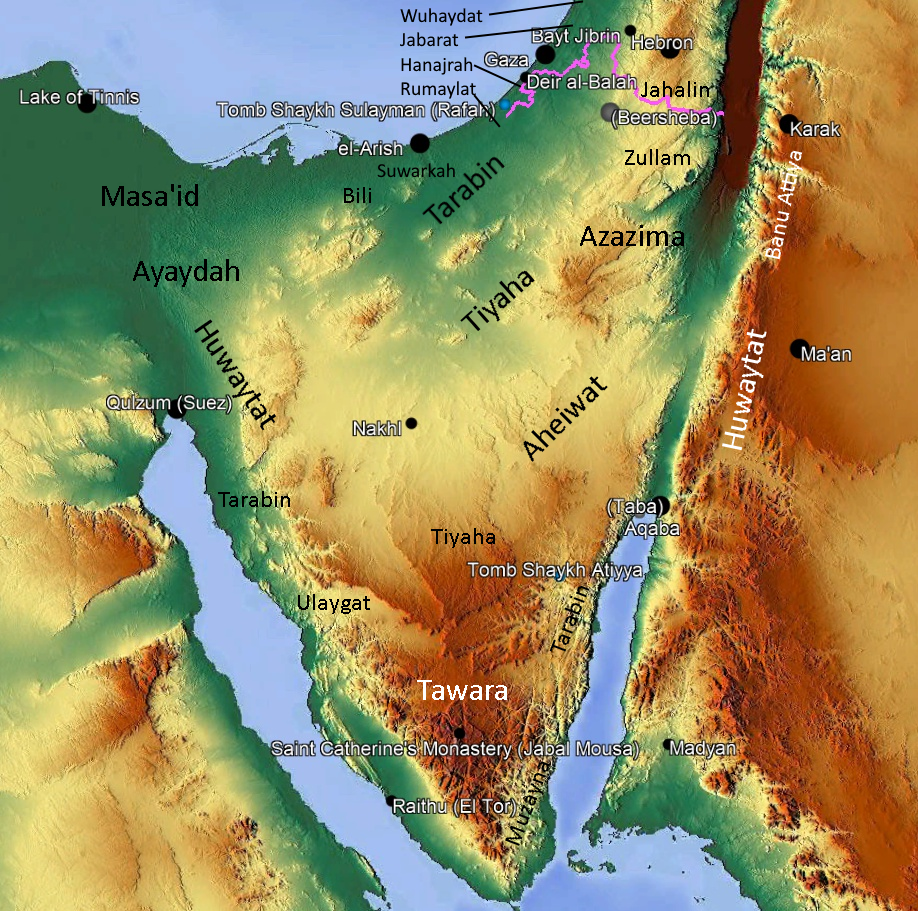
Bedouin tribal territories in the early 20th century

If, during the Mamluk period, Bedouins lived in the Negev (see above) and, as was still the case during the British Mandate, governed their territories in accordance with traditional Bedouin laws, the following applied to Bedouin territories: Despite frequent migrations and border wars, Bedouin tribes had shifting but well-defined territories, called dirah. Land ownership was governed by a set of Bedouin laws, which were enforced both at the community and individual levels by the tribes collectively:

- Invading tribes from outside could be allowed to stay in the tribal territory. If they entered without such permission, they would be expelled by a coalition of the native tribes.
- Individuals had land rights only within their own tribal territory. Land was acquired by developing unused farmland through the removal of stones ("stoning"). A field cleared of stones was considered private property. Usually, half of an owner's lands lay fallow each year as part of a crop rotation system. Additionally, an owner could decide not to cultivate fields for several years if there were not enough pasture plants for his animals in the surrounding area due to drought. If another individual successfully cultivated a field in the owner's absence over several years, the owner was usually informed by neighboring field owners and a property dispute arose. This was adjudicated by a council of judges called "ahl ad-diyār" ("people of the lands"), typically chosen from tribes other than those to which both parties belonged.

However, due to the nature of the evidence regarding Bedouin history, only individual migrations can be reconstructed for the Mamluk and Ottoman periods, but not the resulting dirah boundaries. It is only in the early 20th century that the territorial organization of the Bedouins can be more precisely defined.

=== Tribal history during the Mamluk period ===
By and large, according to the testimonies of contemporary historians, the Jarm, who were already documented during the Crusader era, were the dominant tribe in the Negev during the Mamluk period. Repeatedly, other tribes tried to displace them from this role over the course of this time (see below). Nevertheless, they consistently managed to either remain in the Negev or to return there later: according to Ottoman tax registers, they were still living east of Gaza in the 16th century and were one of the few Negev tribes that paid taxes to the Ottomans.

==== Migration of the Masa'id and the Banu Uqba ====
Oral traditions, as analyzed by al-Ṭayyib, suggest that before the 13th century, parts of the Masa'id migrated from present-day Saudi Arabia to the Gulf of Aqaba region, east of the Jordan river, where they encountered the Bani 'Uqbah. In the 13th century, with the arrival of the Banu Attiya from Saudi Arabia, parts of these two tribes moved further into what is now Israel. The Masa'id briefly replaced the Jarm as the dominant tribe in the Negev. However, when the Mamluks attempted to impose taxes on them, the Masa'id revolted, forming a sort of state within a state, which also deprived the Mamluks of the taxes from surrounding villages. After their tribal leader, Shaykh Sulayman, was killed in the ensuing battles with the Mamluks, the Masa'id dispersed, allowing other tribe to migrate into this area. The grave of Sulayman near Rafah still bears witness to their stay in the Gaza region. Some of the Masa'id stayed in Palestine and eventually merged with the Jarm (see below); today, their descendants live particularly in the village of Al-Jiftlik.

==== Emergence of the Aheiwat ====
The Aheiwat, who were still living in the southern Negev and neighboring Sinai regions in the 20th century, claim to have emerged from the Masa'id. If this is accurate, this emergence must have occurred before the mid-16th century, as they were already distinguished from the Masa'id and located in the southern Negev by al-Jaziri at that time, and as they are attested as a separate tribe in documents of the Saint Catherine's monastery as early as 1605.

==== The Banu Attiya Lineage ====
The Tarabin and Wuhaydat, two prominent tribes during the late Ottoman and Mandate periods, both trace their lineage back to the Banu Attiya. Central to this shared ancestry is the figure of Shaykh Attiya, a historical figure whose legacy has been embraced by both tribes as a symbol of their common roots. His grave, which was already a site of veneration by the mid-16th century, reinforces their claim of descent from the Banu Attiya.

According to the testimony of al-Jaziri, the Wuhaydat were still connected to the Banu Attiya in the mid-16th century and lived, among other places, in the area around Aqaba. Additionally, there is some evidence suggesting that they were present in the Negev as an identifiable tribe up to three centuries earlier: according to the oral traditions of the Bani 'Uqbah and the Masa'id, who migrated to the Negev together (see above), the Wuhaydat were already present when they arrived. If this is accurate, the Banu Attiya/Wuhaydat, after having migrated northward in the 13th century, seem to have passed by the Bani 'Uqbah and the Masa'id (see above) and continued further into the Negev even before them. After the Masa'id interlude, it was the Wuhaydat who replaced the Jarm as the dominant tribe in the southern central Negev in the late Mamluk or early Ottoman period. In the 19th century, parts of the Wuhaydat were a sub-tribe of the Jabarat, other parts a sub-tribe of the Tarabin, and in the early 20th century, Musil reported Wuhaydat "living with the Tiyaha."

The Banu Attiya themselves are first documented in Palestine through written sources by Ibn Iyas. He reports that in 1520, they fought alongside the Banu Aṭa and the Sawālima against the Ottomans when Janbirdi al-Ghazali revolted against them after the Ottomans had conquered the Mamluk Empire four years earlier. This supports the oral tradition of the Masa'id and the Bani 'Uqbah that the Banu Attiya/Wuhaydat were already living in the Negev during the Mamluk period. In tax lists from the beginning to the end of the 16th century, the Banu Attiya, the Banu Aṭa, and the Sawālima are recorded north and east of Gaza; in Ottoman government documents from the late 16th century, two of them are also attested near Hebron.

=== Bedouin-state relations in the Mamluk period ===
When the Mamluks overthrew the Ayyubids around 1250, the Bedouins had already had more than six centuries to spread throughout the Negev, the Sinai Peninsula, and also in Egypt and Palestine; therefore, they vastly outnumbered the Mamluks. Hence, a common theme among early pilgrims of the 14th century, who still took the route through the Negev from Palestine to Mount Sinai, was that the Bedouins, due to their sheer numbers, could easily overpower the Mamluks if they wished to do so.

==== Institutionalization of Ḥimāya ====
The Mamluks, unable to exert effective control over the Bedouins' territories, therefore adopted an Arab system of "shared sovereignty" variously known as ḥimaya ("protection") or khuw(w)a / khaw(w)a ("brotherhood"). In this system, one could place their caravan, lands, or tribe under the protection of a stronger tribe in exchange for a tribute — often a monetary payment; in the case of sedentary people, it could also involve the nominal transfer of their lands to the protecting "brother," after which they continued to work on the land as sharecroppers, sharing the yields with the new owner. Ibn Taghribirdi attached such importance to this system that, in his estimation, it was "the greatest of the causes of the ruin of Egypt and its villages" during the Mamluk period.

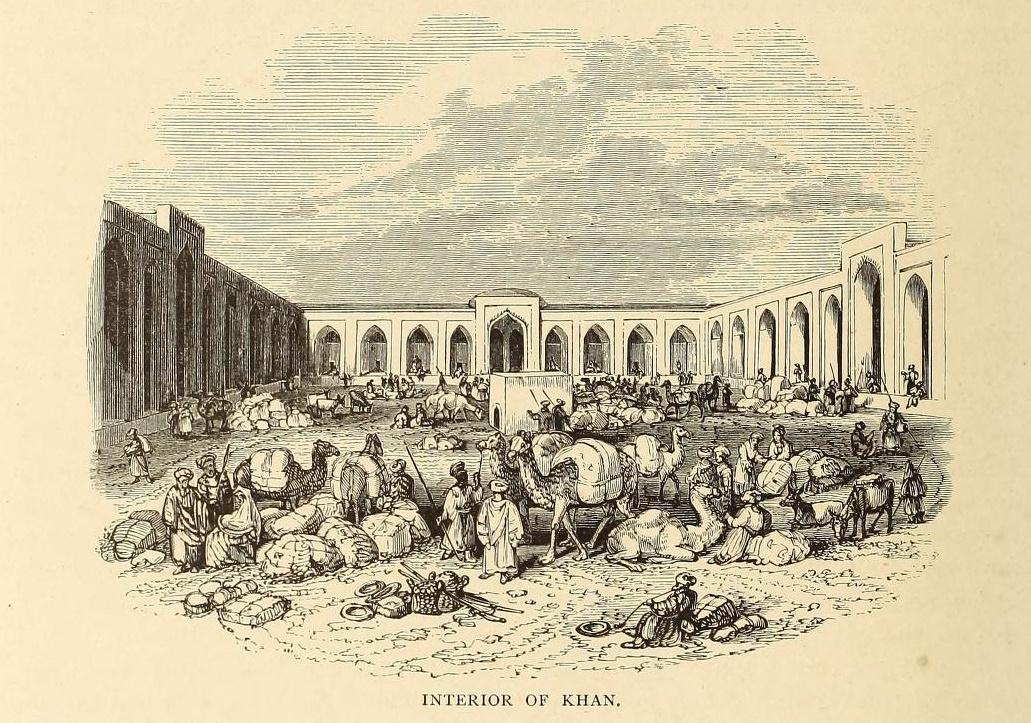
Samuel Manning: Interior of a Khan

Both variations are relevant for the Negev. Along the desert routes, ḥimaya was institutionalized: The Mamluks ensured safe passage for caravans by constructing inns ("khans") – including in the northern Negev – and entrusting the dominant Bedouin tribes with the task of managing these khans and the right to provide caravan ḥimaya.

Even more important was the protection of lands: Alwan al-Ḥamawi (early 16th century) writes that governors imposed such exorbitant tax demands that peasants were forced en masse to seek the "protection" of powerful Bedouins or (more often) wealthy urbanites. However, this protection relationship could also be abused, with peasants being forced into this relationship through violence and/or with the protected peasants being further exploited through the tributes they now owed. Both seems to have occurred regularly.

==== Revolts and Resistance ====
The excessive taxation also had the side effect that Bedouins refused to pay taxes, attacked caravans that other Bedouins were tasked with protecting, and particularly in Egypt, revolts were a regular occurrence. These uprisings were initially brutally suppressed by the Mamluks, but toward the end of the Mamluk period, the Arabs gradually wrested control of Egypt from them. Similarly, the Bedouins east of the Jordan even managed to expel their Mamluk governor and subsequently ruled independently of the Mamluks and Ottomans from the early 16th century until the end of the 19th century. Regarding Palestine and the Negev, in addition to the aforementioned revolt of the Masa'id (also against taxation) and the Bedouins who allied themselves with the Ottomans, a number of smaller conflicts are documented, particularly in the northern Negev between the Jarm and Banu Judham and the authorities of Gaza.

==== Internal conflicts and external crises ====
The political situation in the Negev was further destabilized by internal tribal conflicts. In the 14th century, the Tha'laba invaded and attempted to displace the Jarm, and in the 15th century, a war broke out between the Jarm and the A'id in the area between Ramle, Jerusalem, and Gaza. In the first case, the state powers cooperated with the Jarm and managed to repel the invaders; in the second case, they allied with the A'id but were defeated together by the Jarm.

Adding to the instability was the devastating plague that ravaged Palestine and Egypt during both centuries, particularly in the Gaza area. Dols has calculated that nearly one-third to two-fifths of the population must have perished due to the plague. Many peasants therefore fled to the cities, probably hoping for help from "physicians, exorcists, and pharmacists, and large food reserves."

==== Beduinization of southern Palestine ====
Overall, in the last two-thirds of the Mamluk era, the plague, excessive taxation by the authorities, and Bedouin revolts and wars led to a massive exodus from rural villages as people sought to escape death by fleeing to the cities or avoid the increasingly unprofitable and untenable fate of being a farmer by turning to semi-nomadism. If European travelers are to be believed, by the end of the Mamluk era, Bedouin presence had advanced far into the north, and the plains in southern and central Palestine were inhabited solely by predatory tax collectors.

== Ottoman period ==
=== Territorial history ===
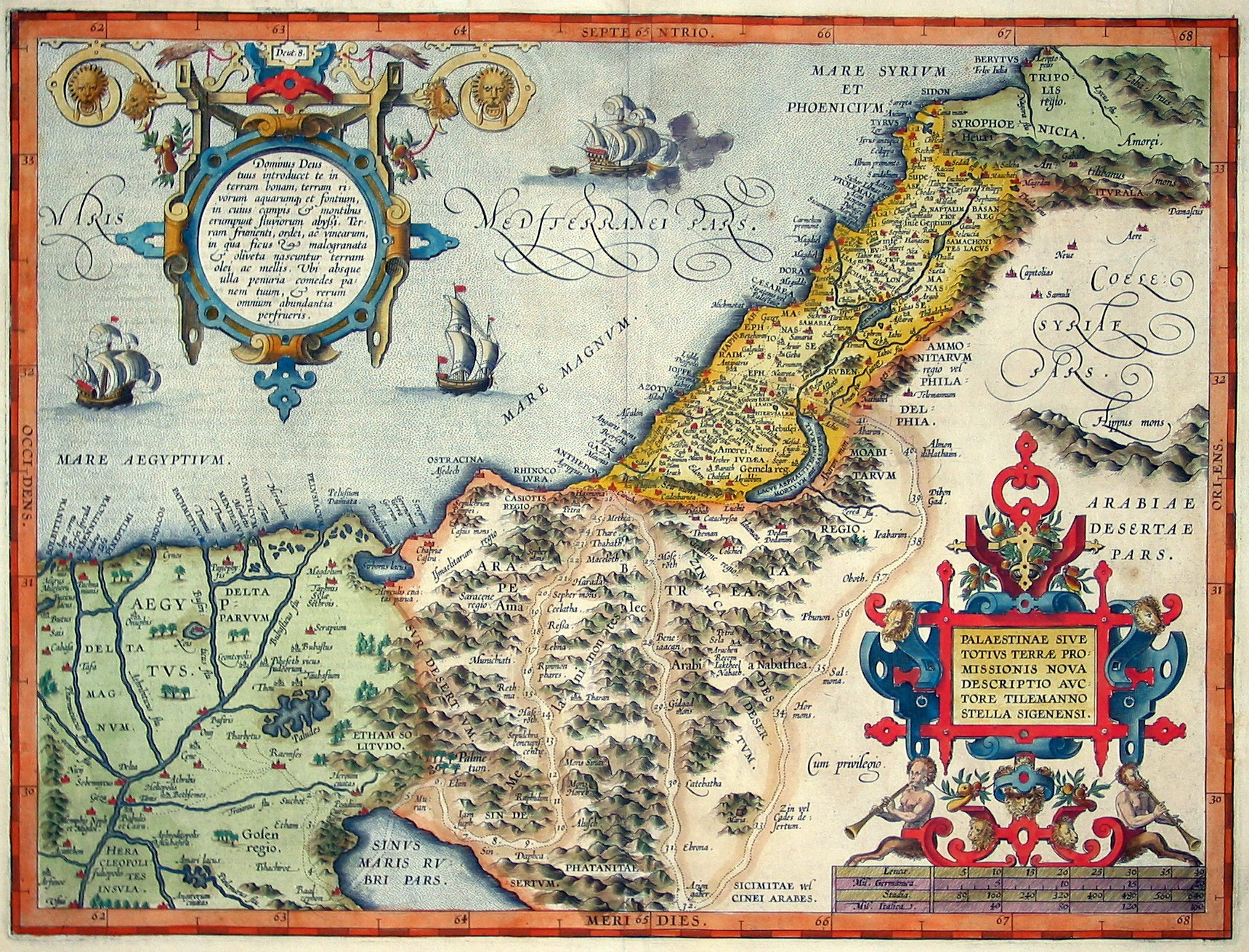
Map by Abraham Ortelius, late 16th century.

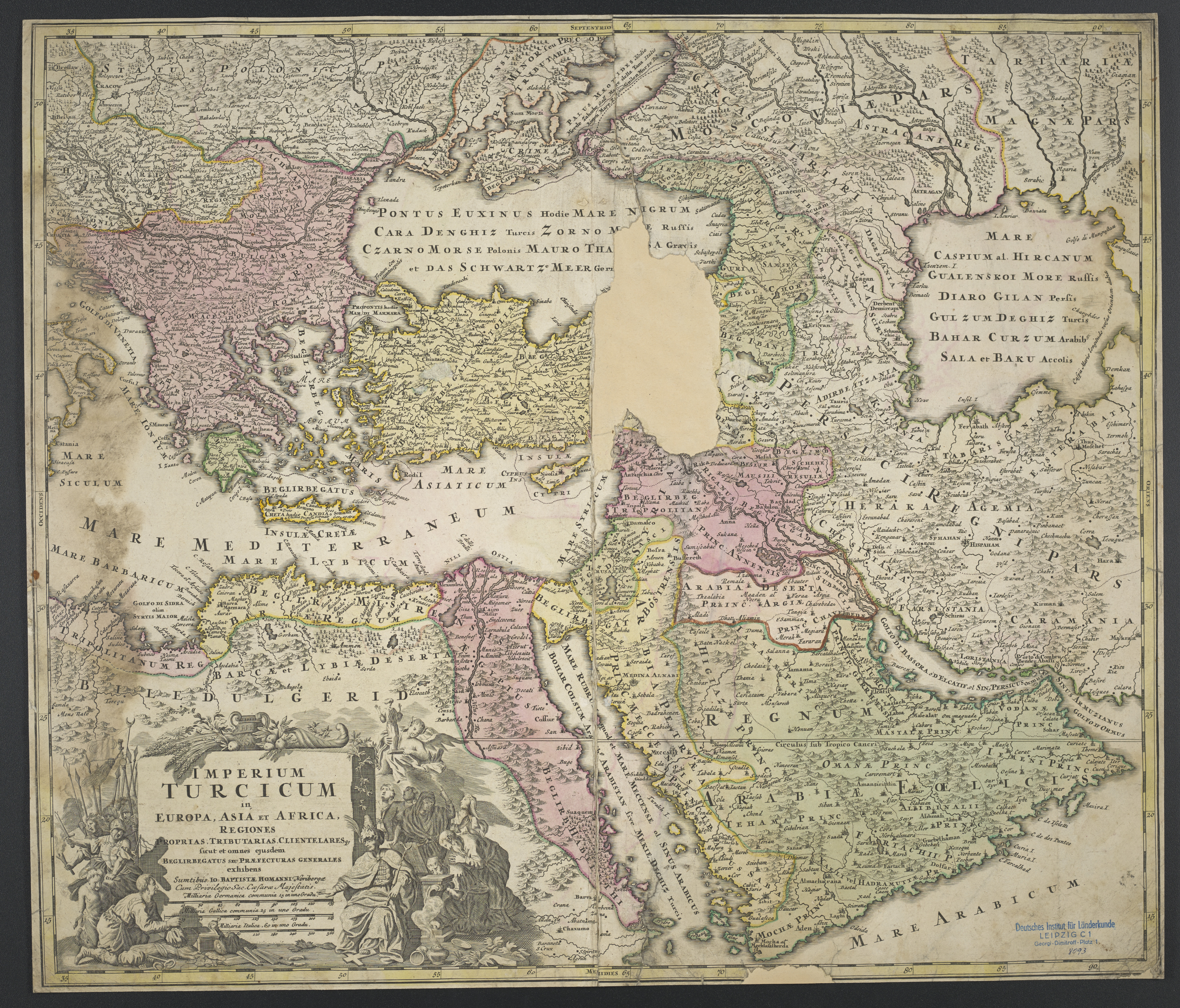
Map by Johann Homann, early 18th century.

Two Ottoman period maps. The province of Hejaz is called "Arabia Petraea", as usual on Europeans maps.

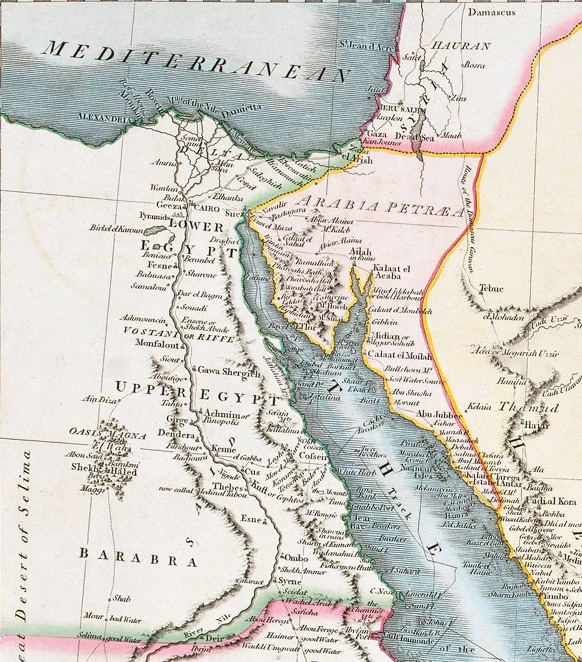
Map by John Cary, 1811.

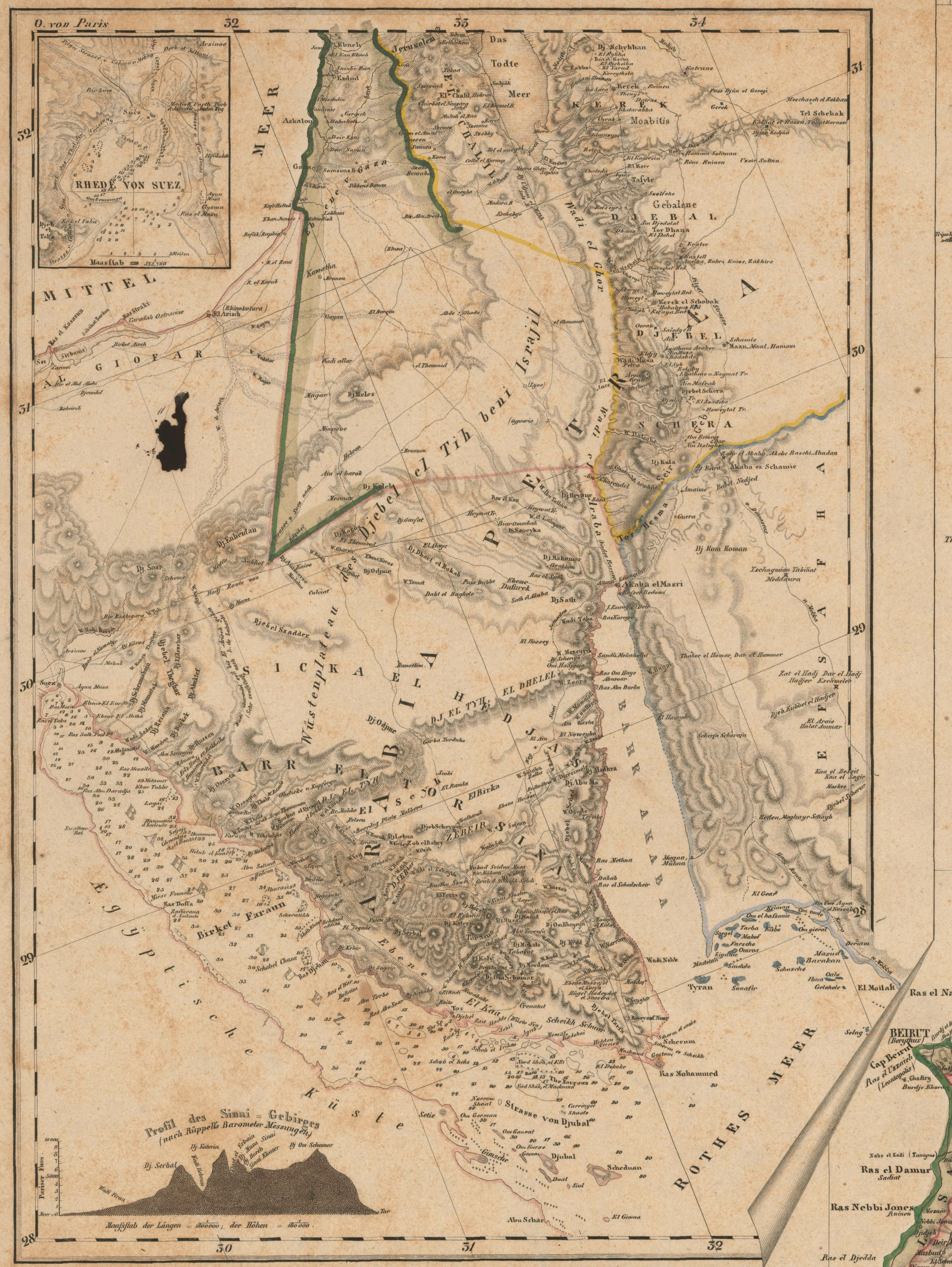
Map by Heinrich Berghaus, 1835.

Two Ottoman period maps. Cary's map largely corresponds to Homann's map (see above), but it now once again shows the Jifâr region on the northern coast of the Sinai as Egyptian territory. On Berghaus' map, the green border marks the Gaza District, now extending down to Nakhl. The southern Negev and Sinai are at the same time called "Sicka el Hedjas" and depicted in red as part of Egypt, reflecting Egypt's conquest in the 1830s.

As can be seen from old maps, the Ottomans structured the Negev region for the longest time in the same way as the Mamluks, as they did with most areas of the Mamluk Empire. Now, Sinai, Negev, southwestern Jordan and the Hejaz were called "Province of Hijjaz."

However, towards the end of the Ottoman period, the southern territorial boundaries of Palestine became unclear, even to the Ottomans themselves. Parts of the Negev and northeastern Sinai were at times instead included within the still frequently shifting boundaries of the Gaza District. These territorial fluctuations intensified when the Egyptians briefly gained control over Sinai and Palestine in the 1830s. This triggered nearly 70 years of territorial disputes between the Ottomans and the British in Egypt, beginning in the 1840s (→ Taba Crisis), after the Egyptians had been pushed back to their own territory. Only towards the end of this border dispute, from 1892 to 1906, was the Negev gradually separated as a distinct area from the rest of the Sinai Peninsula.

It was also only during this time that the words "Negev" and "Negeb" entered the vocabulary as a toponym for a distinct region in languages such as English, German, and French. Previously, even the biblical Hebrew word was not recognized in Bible translations as a toponym, but was instead translated as "southwards" or "the South." In the vocabulary of the Bedouins, the term entered even later: until 1948, Bedouins didn’t refer to themselves as "Negev Bedouins" but rather as "Arabs of Beersheba." However, from the 1940s onwards, the alternative name "Naqab" began to enter discourse as a counter-term to the Zionist concept of the "Negev." It became more widely used only from 2007 onwards.

=== Tribal history during the Ottoman period ===
In the early 20th century, the largest territories in the Negev belonged to the Tiyaha, the Tarabin, and the Azazima. As of now, it is not possible to date the arrival of these three tribes in the Negev.

==== Origin ====
On the origin of the Tarabin, see above.

Regarding the Tiyaha, it is commonly assumed that they were either the original inhabitants of the Sinai, or that they are among the oldest tribes of the Sinai and that they migrated there from the Hejaz in pre-Islamic times. This belief is largely based on the fact that no older tribe is known from which they could have emerged and because they are named after the Sinai desert ("Tih desert"). However, Bailey also reports some oral traditions of the Tiyaha, according to which they arrived in the Sinai only in the 10th/11th century.

Regarding the Azazima, according to their origin story, their forefather Azzam was a Quda'a and had migrated to the Hejaz. His six children migrated further to the Sinai and the Negev, where they grew into a tribe. Later, they were driven from there to El-Arish by the Tiyaha and the Jabarat, eventually reconquered their ancestral homeland, but were subsequently chased to the Negev Highlands by the Tarabin. Thus, according to this origin story, they migrated to the Negev twice: the first time in mythical prehistory, the second time after the Tarabin had already become a distinct tribe. Correspondingly, there are traditions suggesting that they migrated to the Negev after the Tarabin, as well as traditions stating that they were there before them.

==== Arrival in the Negev ====
The first textual evidence that securely places the Tarabin in the Negev is the Description de l’Égypte from 1799 (see below). In addition, the Tarabin are possibly mentioned in two sources from the 17th century in Jenin and the area between Jenin and the Jordan, where they would have lived since at least the early 16th century; however, whether these sources are indeed referring to the Tarabin is uncertain. (Note: In detail: In the mid-17th century, Evliya Çelebi wrote that the "Terabi," whose main territory was the northern Sinai desert, had allied with Sultan Selim I at the beginning of the 16th century. In gratitude, Selim I granted them governance over the Jenin area, located in what is now the northern West Bank. By Çelebi's time, a tomb of the Terabi's ancestors was already present in Jenin. Around the same time, the Franciscan Eugène Roger also reported on the "Therabées," who controlled the fortress of Jenin and were known for committing "robberies" in the region between Jenin and the Jordan. However, only some identify these "Terabi" Bedouins with the Tarabin tribe. Others instead identify them with the Turabay dynasty, whose presence around Jenin at that time is well-established. Roger, however, distinguishes the Therabée from the Turabay by referring to the latter as "Therabith.") It is also unclear whether they had already lived in the Negev or further north in the Jenin area or elsewhere in central Palestine before 1520.

Even more uncertain is the evidence for the Tiyaha: Max von Oppenheim mentions a source that would evidence the existence of the grave of the Tiyaha Sheikh Amri in the center of the Negev Highlands, a two hours' walk north of Avdat, as early as the late 15th century. However, he expresses justified doubts about the reliability of this source, and the next evidence of Tiyaha presence in the Negev is found only in Seetzen's travel accounts from 1807, where the Negev, up to Hebron, is referred to as "land of the Tiyaha."

For the Azazima, besides their oral history, there is not even similarly uncertain evidence as for the Tarabin and the Tiyaha prior to Seetzen's travel account.

Oppenheim believes that the Negevite Tiyaha and Tarabin clans were sub-tribes of the Wuhaydat until the late 18th century. In contrast, the Israeli ethnologist Clinton Bailey claimed in two articles, which are widely cited in Western scholarship, that all three tribes migrated to the Negev in the early 19th century. However, Bailey's conclusions are inconsistent with the sources he references; the traditions and documents on which he bases his claim actually state the opposite. For details, see the footnote. (Note: In detail: According to the oral history that Bailey himself conveys, the Tiyaha were already living in the northern Negev before the 19th century. The passage in Seetzen's travel report (1807), from which Bailey nonetheless infers that they immigrated to the Negev around 1799, is mistranslated — there is no mention of migration — and it apparently refers to a different tribe altogether.; Like the Tiyaha, the Tarabin are explicitly located by the Description de l’Égypte both in the Tih desert and in the Gaza region in 1798.; Both Azazima clans that Seetzen encountered lived in the Negev Highlands; and again, Seetzen explicitly writes that the Azazima usually stayed near Gaza during the summer.; Similarly to Bailey, Israeli historians Ruth Kark, Seth J. Frantzman, and Havatzelet Yahel have argued that most Bedouin tribes currently in the Negev arrived only recently, based on comparisons between 16th-century Ottoman tax registers and 20th-century tribal lists. However, this claim is problematic for several reasons. The tax registers only covered areas up to the southern Gaza Strip, omitting most of the Negev's area. Additionally, contrary to their claims, five of the six tribes recorded in the Negev during the Ottoman period still exist in Palestine even today.) Thus, one can assume that all three tribes certainly lived in the Negev before the 19th century, but beyond that, nothing is certain.

=== Bedouin-state relations ===
==== 1516 – 1660s: Stable relations and dynastic governance ====
The Ottomans continued the ḥimaya policy of the Mamluks. If protection payments by the Ottomans or the protected caravans were not made, Bedouin tribes could raid caravans or rebel against the state, as has been documented multiple times, particularly in the cases of the Banu Aṭa and Banu Attiya.

By and large, however, during the first two centuries of Ottoman rule, there was relative stability in southern Palestine and across the Jordan river, as four dynasties emerged that skillfully managed to govern their respective territories. In addition to the well-known Turabay dynasty and the Farrukh dynasty, which governed central Palestine, the following are particularly important for the Negev's history:

- The Riḍwān dynasty, who usually held the positions of district governors of Gaza: Although, unlike the Turabay dynasty and the Qānsūḥ dynasty, they were not indigenous but rather Ottoman officials, the power of the Riḍwān family was based on effective alliances with local Bedouin tribes. This is why the grandson of the dynasty's founder, Ḥasan Pasha ibn Aḥmad, was even nicknamed "Arap" ("the Bedouin"). During the regency of his son Ḥusayn towards the end of the 17th century, Gaza had grown so much and accumulated such wealth — thanks to the good relations between the rulers and the Bedouins — that it was regarded as the capital of Palestine.
- The Qānsūḥ family, originating from the Karak region, who regularly governed the Karak–Shawbak Sanjak and occasionally also the Ajlun Sanjak east of the Jordan: Given the limited Ottoman control over these Bedouin-dominated areas, the Qānsūḥs also relied heavily on agreements with the Bedouins.

==== Late 17th to 18th century: Economic decline and transformation ====
Dror Ze'evi argues that the rule of the Riḍwān dynasty over Gaza represented the "last golden age of the city": Following the violent overthrow of the Qānsūḥs around 1633 and the other three dynasties in the 1660s and 1670s by the central Ottoman government, which sought to dismantle these overly powerful dynasties, the Gaza region entered a period of economic decline. During this time, newly appointed governors, who had less favorable relations with the local population, imposed excessive taxation, as was widespread throughout the Ottoman Empire at that time (→ Malikâne). Additionally, Bedouins resumed their raids on villages and towns, further contributing to the region's economic devastation.

However, this decline should be viewed with some limitations: While Bedouin incursions and overtaxation were indeed widely reported in the 17th and 18th centuries, and Gaza's population had indeed shrunk to around 2,000 inhabitants by the late 18th century, the decline in population was also due to the fact that in the 18th century, the plague returned to Palestine with full force. Despite this, Ottoman records show that the economic output of Jaffa and Gaza quintupled during the 18th century. A similar pattern of population decline due to the plague coupled with economic growth was observed in Acre.

Thus, when de Volney visited Gaza in the 1780s, he noted that despite a modest population, the city was economically vibrant, with rich agriculture extending eastward into the Negev up to the "Road to Mecca," and well-established soap and textile industries involving local Bedouins. This suggests that any economic decline in the Gaza area following the 1670s was short-lived.

While specific governors were responsible for the concurrent economic growth in Acre, Nablus, and Jaffa, the details of Gaza's resurgence remain less clear, with only the later development of barley exports in the 19th and 20th centuries being well-documented.

==== Late 18th to early 20th centuries: Gaza barley ====
From the second half of the 18th century onwards, Palestine gradually transformed into an export nation, beginning with the rule of the Bedouin Zahir al-Umar (from the 1730s) and the Mamluk Jazzar Pasha (from 1776) in Northern Palestine, who introduced the cotton export. This was followed by Jaffa's Ottoman governor Muhammad Abu Nabbut (1807-1818), who established the orange trade, and then again followed by the brief interim rule of the Egyptians Muhammad Ali and Ibrahim Pasha over all of Palestine, with soap, olive oil, and again cotton becoming the most important export goods.

The fact that de Volney reported a well-developed export of fruits to Europe, as well as an established textile and soap industry in Gaza already during the 1780s (which continued to thrive thereafter) suggests that this southernmost Sanjak of Palestine was involved in these developments from the outset. However, the precise connections between these developments in Gaza and those in the north have yet to be researched.

These economic developments attracted more Europeans with their newly developed steam boats to Palestine. Over time, these steam boats diminished some of the Bedouins' traditional economic roles: fewer caravans required guidance through the desert, and fewer goods needed to be transported across it, as the desert could now be bypassed by steam boat. Additionally, the import of European mass-produced goods led to a decline in local textile prices.

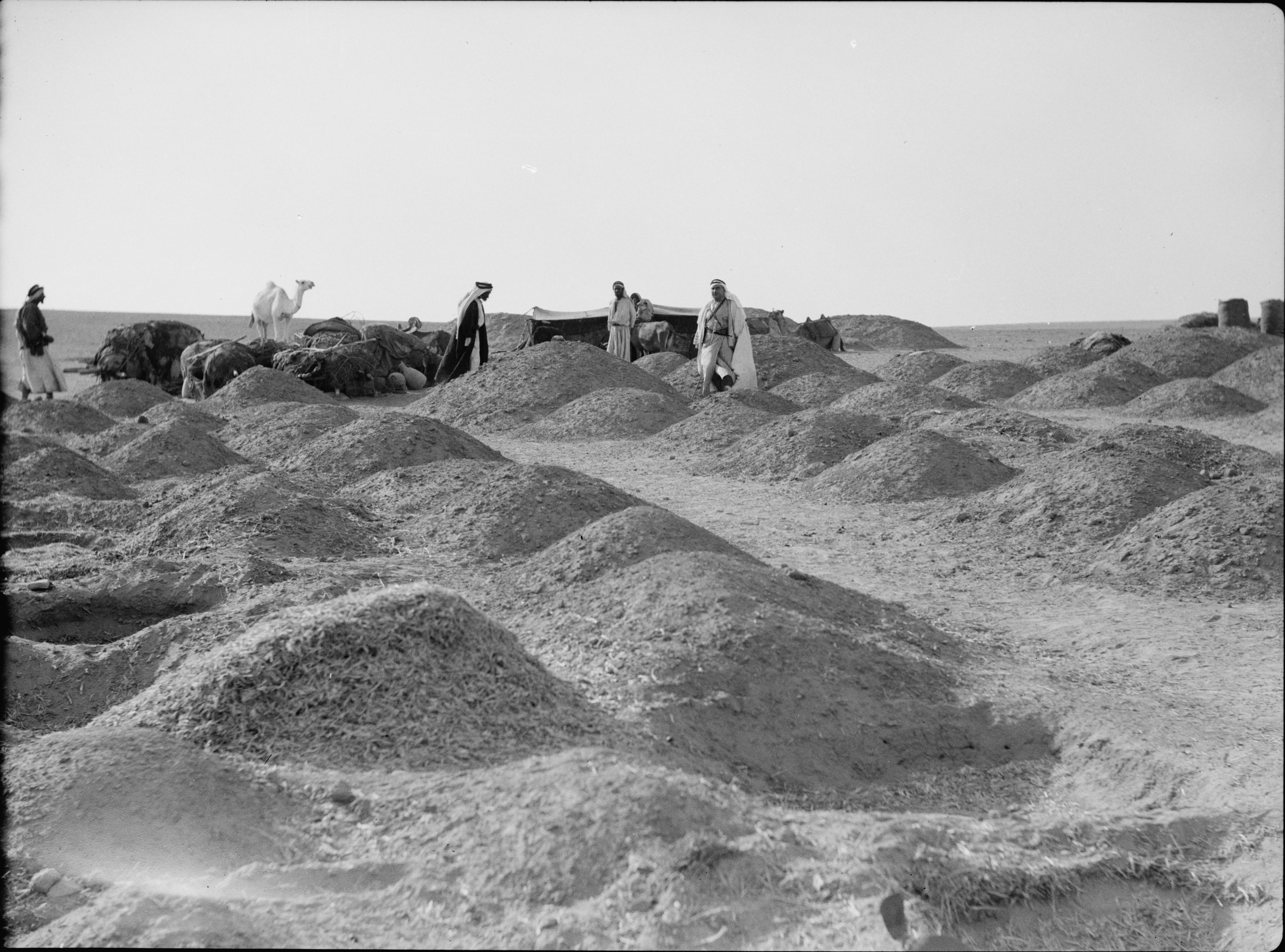
Bedouin barley piles covered with straw and earth. Beersheba, 1920

However, the steamship trade also enabled the British to import barley from Palestine. From the 1850s, Gaza developed into a hub for trading "Gaza barley," also known as "badawi abyad" ("Bedouin White"). During several years of the Ottoman period, Gaza barley was Palestine's economically most important export, with tens of thousands of tons exported annually.

From just before the start of the British Mandate (1923) until the end of the Mandate period (1947), there were several surveys of the Negev that showed how much Bedouin agriculture had intensified over time. According to most estimates, the agricultural area gradually increased during the British Mandate period from about 300,000 hectares to 400,000 hectares (Note: That is surprising, as the British published significantly lower estimates in 1946 and 1947, and these lower estimates were predominantly cited in subsequent years. However, the higher estimates are also indirectly supported by Yosef Weitz, who reported a yield of 137 kg of barley per hectare for Bedouin agriculture in the Negev. Given that the exports of Gaza barley averaged 40,000 tons per year at the end of the Ottoman period, this implies that nearly 300,000 hectares of land were required solely for producing the exported barley even before the Mandate Period.) (a comparable, but significantly larger, growth trend is also evident in the adjacent southern West Bank). These 400,000 ha represented nearly 36% of the agricultural land in the region of Palestine and covered almost the entire northern half of the Negev. As parts of this area weren't suitable for agriculture (mainly due to the sand dunes in the western central Negev), the Azazima likely utilized the Negev Highlands for agriculture similarly to the Nabateans in the Byzantine era. Correspondingly, in 1941, Jacob Verman and Daniel Zohary surveyed the Negev Highlands and found Bedouins practicing wadi agriculture throughout the region, except in areas near the Ramon Crater. – partly on reused, partly on enhanced and partly on self-built terraces. (Note: Bedouin agriculture in the Negev highlands during the 19th and early 20th centuries was long overlooked, as most authors focused on the clearly more significant region between Gaza and Hebron. Only recently have Avi Oppenheim and the authors of "Emptied Lands" shown how well-documented highland agriculture was even at that time. Examples include Edward Robinson and Eli Smith, who reported Azazima farming in the area of former Nessana ("Aujeh") in the central Negev (among other places) in 1838, Ulrich Jasper Seetzen, who reported Azazima farming at multiple locations of the biblical and central Negev in 1807, and Johann Ludwig Burckhardt, who reported Bedouin agriculture in the Arad area and the adjacent, more fertile Ghor valley before 1817.)

Despite this expansion of agriculture, it did not lead to a widespread sedentarization of the Negev Bedouins. Most of them were still semi-nomadic in 1948, (Note: The term "sedentarization" refers to the process of settling into permanent, built houses and villages, as opposed to "semi-nomadism," which involves practicing seasonal migration with recurring tent dwelling places. According to Yaakov Habakkuk, "semi-nomadic" Bedouins typically dwelt with their families in specific places within their tribe’s territory, cultivating their land and migrating only temporarily to graze their flocks, leaving some family members behind in their permanent tent dwelling place. This interpretation of Bedouin settlement patterns is sometimes disputed by Palestinian authors today. However, research by Saidel and Blakely, based on travel reports, indicates that even in the Tel el-Hesi region at the northern fringes of the Negev, Bedouin field owners had still not become sedentary by the 20th century. Similarly, Seth Frantzman, through local village records and aerial photographs, demonstrated that as late as 1946, only about 10% of the Bedouins lived in houses or huts, primarily in Beersheba. While some structures were built near Bedouin fields, they did not regularly serve as permanent homes for Bedouins. Instead, as Dotan Halevy notes: Yet it would be simplistic to imagine a neat line dividing pastoralists and agriculturalists, 'Bedouin' and 'Fellahin.' In the Gaza region, some settled villages were inhabited by semi-nomadic peoples that participated in both forms of economic life, balancing farming and grazing. Some Bedouin tribes dominated agricultural villages where subordinate clans worked their masters' land [as in Tel el-Hesi]. [...] Sometimes, even fully nomadic groups could produce surpluses of grains to be sold alongside their livestock in the markets of Gaza. — Dotan Halevy, 2021) although by the end of the Mandate period, there was an increasing tendency to build individual permanent houses or storage facilities within larger recurring tent dwelling places. Reflecting on this situation, British diplomats declared:

The statement, so often made for propaganda purposes, that nearly half of Palestine (Naqab) is still empty and available for settlement is roughly speaking true as regards its emptiness but altogether false and misleading as regards its availability.

— PRO, FO 371/61868

==== Late 19th to early 20th centuries: Tanzimat reforms and Beersheba ====
Following the brief conquest of Palestine by the Egyptians in the 1830s, the Ottomans sought to stabilize the border regions of their empire, particularly the Negev and the Sinai Peninsula between Palestine and Egypt. The preferred method for this were the so-called "Tanzimat land reforms", which included a package of legislative amendments designed to privatize and commodify land. The goal was to sedentarize the inhabitants of these border regions by forcing them to register land in their names as private individuals and to cultivate it continuously: If one failed to register their lands and/or did not cultivate them continuously, the lands were considered mawat ("dead land") and reverted to the state.

Many Bedouins, however, refused to register their lands, presumably due to the overtaxation in recent history. Therefore, in the second half of the 19th century, the Ottomans attempted to achieve their goals through coercion. In the case of the Jarm, for example, who had meanwhile gained control over other tribes in the Jordan Valley but were eventually driven further west by the rebellious Masa'id, a large portion of their lands was confiscated because they failed to register them. Even more extreme measures were taken in present-day Jordan and Syria: there, Bedouins were forcibly displaced, and areas they considered their tribal territory were instead given to sedentary Circassians.

Comparable measures could not be enforced in the south of Palestine due to the lack of Ottoman military troops. However, as the British in Egypt, during the Taba Crisis, gradually began to annex the Sinai Peninsula through pressure politics and military actions, the stabilization of the border areas became increasingly urgent for the Ottomans. In response, they radically shifted their Bedouin policy, seeking "to gain Bedouin support for the government in its endeavors." Thus, in 1892, the Ottomans started to buy the favor of Bedouin sheikhs by bestowing titles upon them. Now, instead of imposing governors upon the Bedouins, they had a say in the appointment of governors and could even dismiss them.

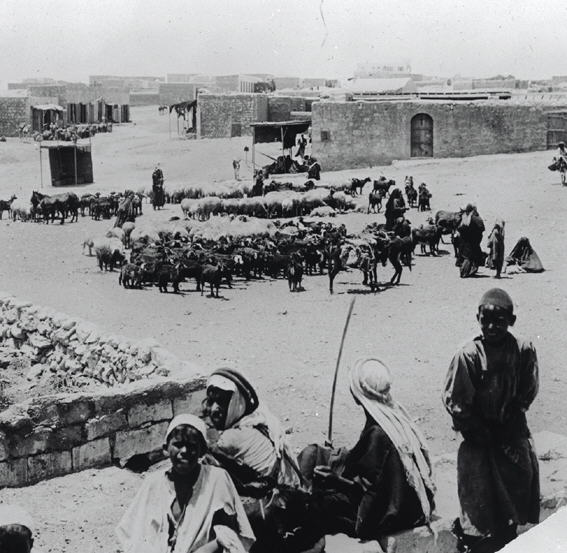
Market of Beersheba, 1901

The culmination of this new policy was the creation of the new Beersheba District in 1899, whose boundaries were drawn in such a way that it was almost exclusively a Bedouin district. As a regional center, the city of Beersheba was built at a point where the tribal territories of three major Negev Bedouin tribal confederations converged. Instead of granting Bedouin land to sedentary refugees for settlement, now the Bedouins were given land in this city for free. The more Bedouin-friendly policy went so far that, in the case of the Negev Bedouins, a 1902 decision exempted them from the requirement to register their lands. Instead, land ownership was governed "based on local custom and tradition." Additionally, it was permitted for other legal matters relevant only within this new Beersheba district to be adjudicated according to Bedouin customary law by a "management council" of tribal chiefs, unlike in the northern regions.
