= Taba Crisis =

Diplomatic conflict between the British and Ottoman empires

The Taba Crisis (also known as the Aqaba Crisis) was a diplomatic conflict arising from territorial disputes between the British and Ottoman empires in Egypt and in Palestine at the beginning of the 20th century. It holds significant importance in political history: in conjunction with preceding events, the conflict nearly precipitated the outbreak of a conflict that foreshadowed World War I as early as 1906. Its aftermath also led to the emergence of the Negev as a distinct region, ultimately incorporated into Palestine as a "historical accident."

== Background ==
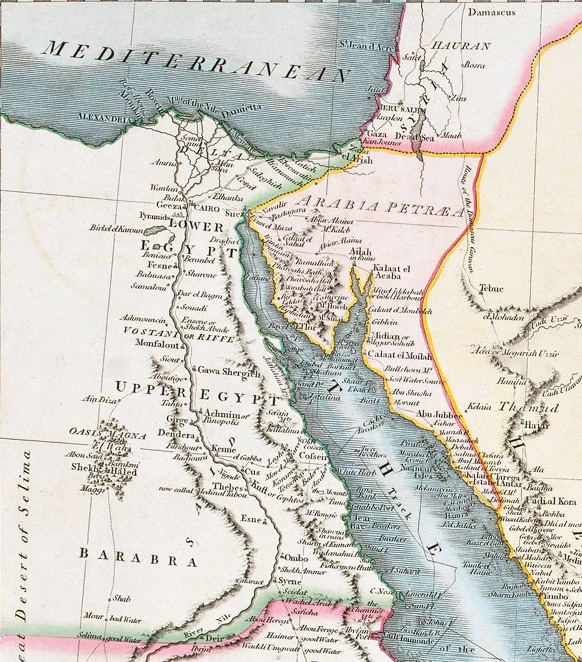
Map from 1819: Egypt, Palestine, and the Sinai Peninsula, shown here with a common political division: the "Jifâr region" belonging to Egypt, and the remainder politically grouped with a region east of the Jordan River

In the first half of the 19th century, Palestine, the Sinai Peninsula and Egypt were part of the Ottoman Empire, but they were integrated into it to varying degrees: in Egypt, Muhammad Ali had taken power in 1805 and was now ruling there as a kind of semi-independent vassal king ("Wāli"). The Sinai had for many centuries been an integral part of a region that also included the region later known as the "Negev" and often also southwestern Jordan and northwestern Hejaz, which, as a whole, was known during Ottoman times as the "Province of Hejaz." Up to this time, the Negev region didn't even have its own name (→ History of the Negev during the Mamluk and Ottoman periods). This area was almost exclusively populated by Bedouins, who were largely independent of Ottoman rule. Only a region along the northern coast of the Sinai Peninsula known as al-Jifâr, through which an important trade route known as the Via Maris passed, appears to have generally been regarded as part of Egypt territorially from around the 14th century onward.

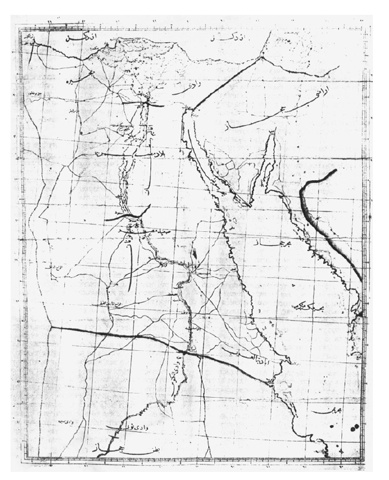
Copy of map attached to the Inheritance Firman, 1841

However, in the 1830s, Muhammad Ali revolted against the Ottomans and briefly gained control over Sinai and Palestine. Following the Egyptian–Ottoman War from 1839 to 1841, in which the Egyptians were pushed back in Palestine and which was ultimately a proxy war between France, who supported the Egyptians, and a coalition of European nations, which supported the Ottomans, at the Convention of London in 1840, it was enforced that Egypt largely withdraw from the Sinai, retaining only the Jifâr region northwest of a line from Rafah to Suez, corresponding to Egypt's "ancient borders". This territory was then marked on a map and formally assigned to their Egyptian subjects by the Ottomans through the so-called "Inheritance Firman" of 1841. Later, the starting point of the Firman line from Rafah would mark one of the two points crucial for defining the Negev. Despite this firman, the Egyptians, with the consent of the Ottomans, continued to administer the waystations along the second major trade and pilgrimage route through Sinai and the Negev, extending further southeast into the Hejaz region, from Suez via Nekhel and Aqaba, known as the King's Highway.

External images
- Ottoman map from 1897 showing the Sinai Peninsula in red as part of Egypt
- Map by the Egyptian Interior Ministry from the 1870s showing Egypt without the Inheritance Firman territory

Both stipulations led to the territorial status of Sinai and the Negev becoming somewhat ambiguous after 1841: The Ottomans initially sometimes produced maps that depicted the Negev as "Egyptian" territory, while the Egyptians produced maps that did not even recognize the area of the Inheritance Firman as part of Egypt.

The French subsequently built the economically vital Suez Canal by 1869, with its southern end still lying in Ottoman territory. However, after Britain established effective control over Egypt as a de facto protectorate in 1882 (with Egypt being only nominally still under Ottoman sovereignty) British and Indian merchants benefited economically from the canal while concomitantly weakening the value of Ottoman trade routes. Britain's control over the canal also made Ottoman military movements in Palestine and the Hejaz dependent on British authorization.

Consequently, the Ottomans began efforts to extend their de facto control southwestward. Meanwhile, the British sought to keep the Ottomans away from the Suez Canal and the Gulf of Aqaba, which had the potential to threaten their dominance in the Red Sea through the Suez Canal. This struggle for the Sinai and the Negev unfolded roughly in four stages:

== 1892: Border redefinitions ==
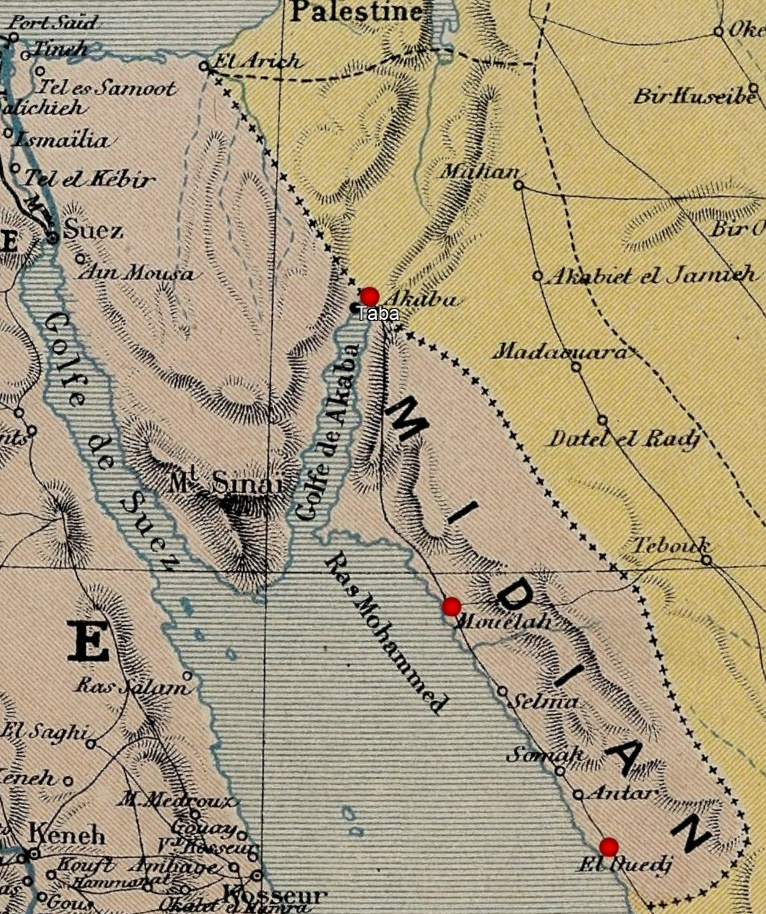
Three Hajj forts returned to the Ottomans (red) + Taba (black)

Stage 1 consisted of two measures that were more symbolic than directly political: When Egypt's ruler, Khedive Tewfik Pasha, died in 1892, the Ottomans had to confirm the rule of his son, Abbas Helmy II. In the renewal of the firman that confirmed Abbas as the ruler of Egypt, however, the document was deliberately crafted to explicitly exclude the Sinai from Egyptian territory. Instead, it was only stated in a telegram that Egypt should continue administering some of the Sinai forts:

Your highness is well aware that His Majesty the Sultan had ordered the positioning of Egyptian policemen that will secure the pilgrimage in El-Waja, Muwalla, Daba and Aqaba, and in a few other places on the coast of Sinai, in the past. All of these points are absent from the map that marked Egypt's boundaries, which was given to Muhammad Ali. El-Waja was already returned to the province of Hijaz, and the other three points were added to it recently. The status quo in the Sinai Peninsula will prevail, and it will be governed by the [Khedive] just as has been governed in the days of your father and your grandfather.

The return of Aqaba as the westernmost of these mentioned locations would soon become the second point in defining the Negev border.

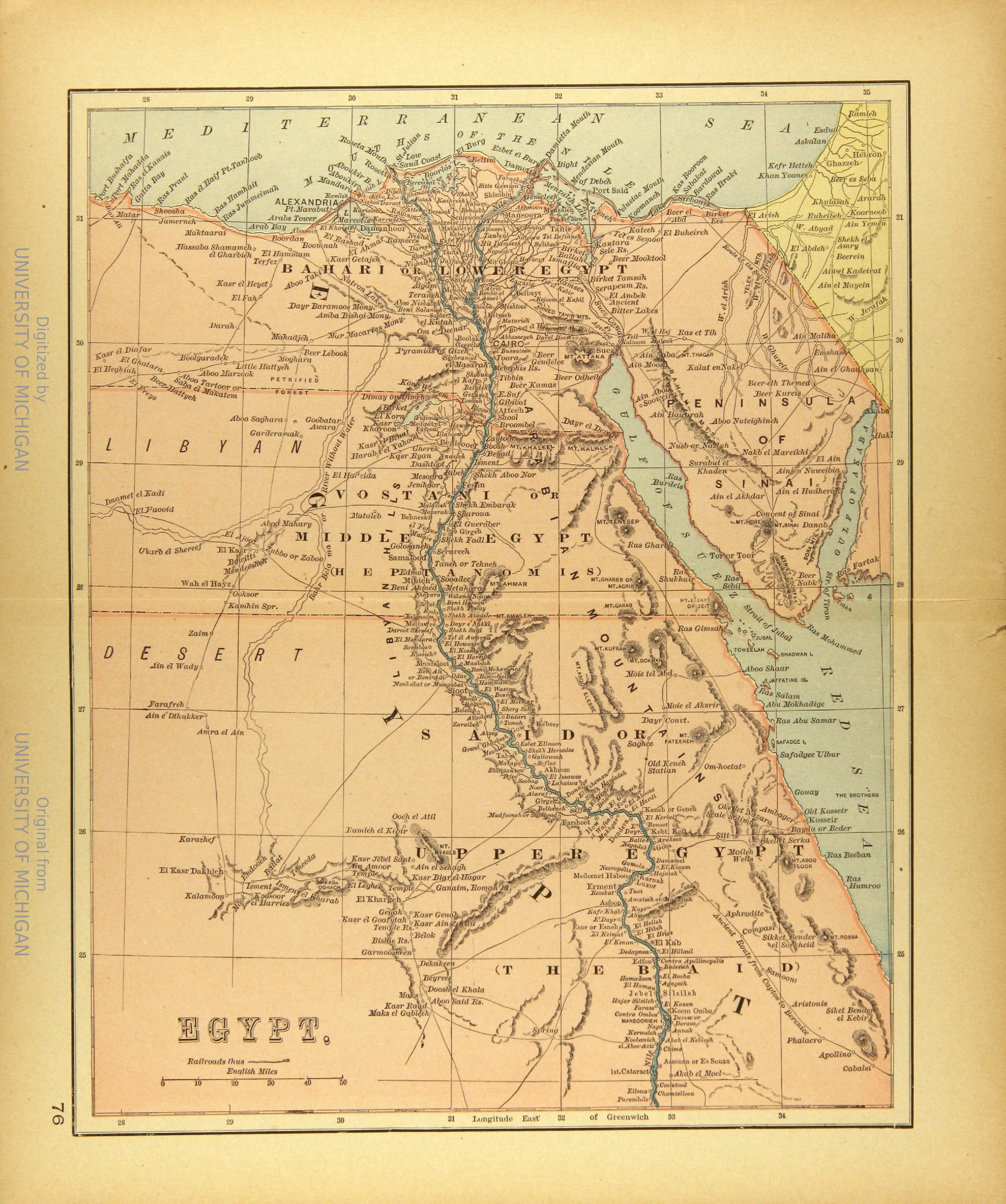
British map of Egypt, 1894, showing Egypt's borders as defined by Lord Cromer in 1892.

The British Consul General in Cairo, Lord Cromer, did not accept this and responded with a telegram of his own, disregarding the fact that the Sultan’s message referred to the Inheritance Firman map and specified the Khedives’ traditional "governing role" as a mandate to position policemen rather than a territorial claim: Cromer interpreted the Sultan’s firman-cum-telegram as a formal "definition of boundaries" declaring Egypt’s territory as "bounded to the east by a line running in a south-easterly direction from a point a short distance to the east of El Arish, the easternmost waystation on the coast,] [...] to the head of the Gulf of Akaba." Thereafter, the British began to produce maps that excluded the head of the Gulf of Aqaba from Ottoman territory and presented everything southwest of the thus defined border as "Egyptian." In 1892, there was no response from the Ottomans to this telegram; it was officially rejected only in 1906. For this reason, Cromer's telegram is sometimes regarded as a British–Ottoman "agreement," while others see it as merely a "unilateral declaration" not accepted by the Ottomans or an incorrect "interpretation" from Cromer.

It is possible that the early Zionists also played a role in this matter: The first generation of Zionists had been attempting to settle in Palestine since 1882, but Jewish immigration to Palestine and Jewish land purchases in Palestine had already been prohibited by Ottoman law that same year; partly because, since the 1840s, the British had attempted to increase their influence in the Middle East by claiming the status of protector of Jews wishing to immigrate there. As a result, Zionist Jews tried to enter Palestine as illegal immigrants or via indirect routes. One such indirect route was the attempt by the German Zionist Paul Friedmann around 1892, with the consent of British authorities in Egypt, to establish a Jewish state called "Midian" on the Gulf of Aqaba's east coast, which Cromer was just about to declare as "Egyptian": Cromer himself reports that it was this attempt that brought the Ottoman Sultan to redraft the Firman. However, since this was but a rather desperate colonization attempt and Cromer's report is quite misleading, it is not certain whether this was indeed a major factor.

== 1899/1900: Beersheba and the Beersheba District ==
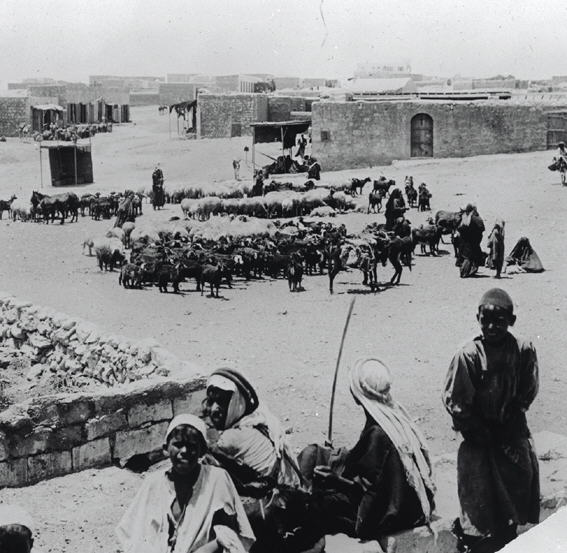
Market of Beersheba, 1901

The second stage consisted of a series of Ottoman actions aimed at gaining control over the Negev and Sinai. These began with a package of legislative amendments designed to privatize and commodify land, with the goal of sedentarizing the Bedouins in Ottoman border regions and thereby stabilizing these areas under Ottoman control. The culmination of this new policy was the establishment of the new Beersheba District in 1899, with boundaries drawn to include an almost exclusively Bedouin population. As a regional center, the city of Beersheba was built at a point where the tribal territories of three major Negev Bedouin tribes converged.

== 1902: The el-Arish–Rafah affair ==
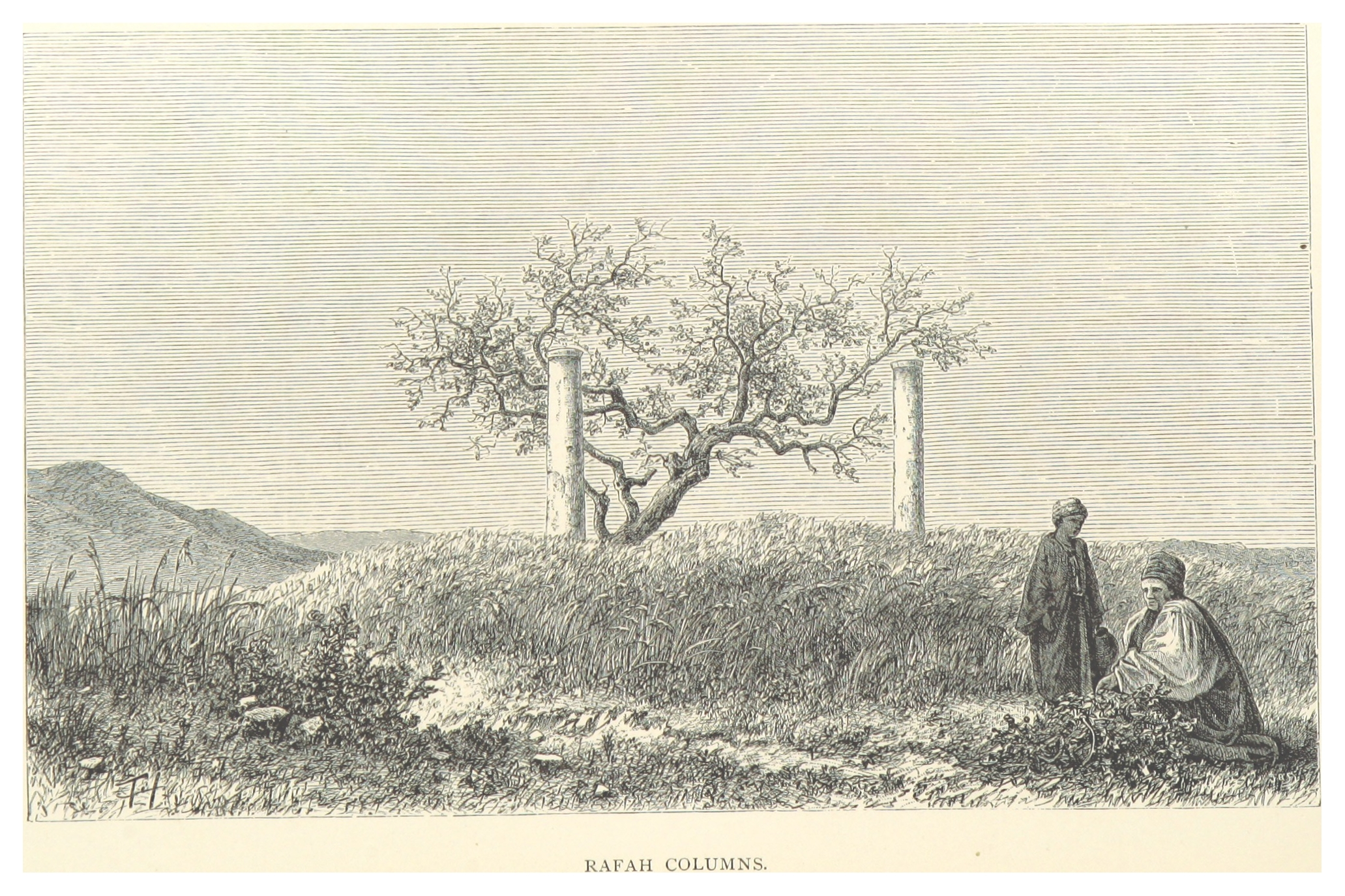
Boundary markers at Rafah, 1881

Lord Cromer wanted to respond to this by now pushing the boundary he had earlier drawn himself in the north from el-Arish to Rafah; however, the British Foreign Office explicitly rejected this proposal. Nevertheless, around 1902, two measures were undertaken to further shift the northern boundary. First, two boundary markers at Rafah, which were said to have marked the ancient boundary line between Palestine and Egypt, were either moved or newly established unilaterally by the British and Egyptians in accordance with Lord Cromer's new proposal. The Ottomans would respond only in 1906 (see below); in 1902, however, this British action again had no direct consequences.

Second, some Zionists had already anticipated this boundary-shifting proposal from Cromer and interpreted the creation of the Jerusalem Sanjak in 1887, which reached only down to Rafah at that time, as a cession of Ottoman-Palestinian territories to Egypt. Subsequently, Zionists including Davis Trietsch developed plans to begin the colonization of Palestine in the "Egyptian-Palestine" region between el-Arish and Rafah. This led shortly afterward to Theodor Herzl's attempt from 1902 onwards to negotiate this area from the British for a Jewish state. Since the British were willing to negotiate over all areas "where there were no white people as yet," Lord Cromer was initially indeed willing to cede him territories west of el-Arish, which harmonized well with his own plans to push back the Ottomans. However, soon thereafter, he withdrew the offer again — officially, because Friedmann's attempt near Aqaba had already enraged the Ottomans, and because the Zionist plans to irrigate El-Arish with pumped Nile water were unrealistic; but actually, probably mainly so as not to "'remind' the Ottomans to address the delimitation problem, and to claim that a foreign settlement was not permitted in the province of Hijaz, which included Sinai."

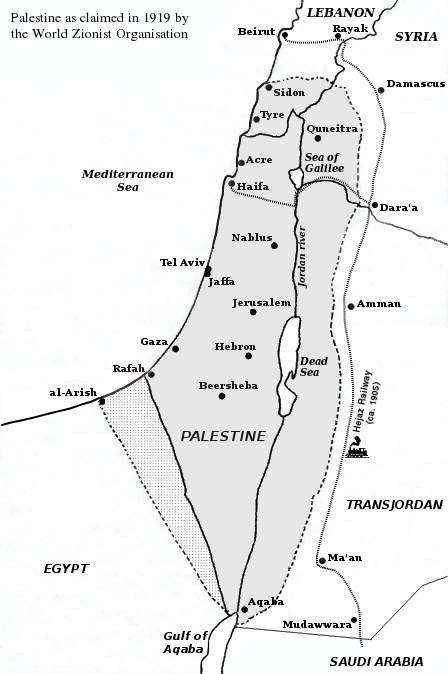
Territorial aspirations of the World Zionist Organization in 1919 at the Paris Peace Conference

Although these early plans to colonize el-Arish failed, they still had lasting repercussions: later, they prompted the Zionists to aspire, at the Paris Peace Conference of 1919, to a Palestine whose southwestern border extended from el-Arish to Aqaba, closely matching Lord Cromer's earlier proposed border redefinition.

== 1906: The Taba Crisis ==
With this background, the ground was prepared for the struggle for the Negev to almost escalate into an international war. The trigger was the serious Ottoman preparations made in that year to connect the Gulf of Aqaba or even the Gulf of Suez with the Hejaz Railway. This would have given the Ottoman armies, and through the Berlin–Baghdad railway, which had also been seriously considered since 1903, the armies of their newly allied Germans direct access to the Red Sea. Control over this maritime region, which connected Britain with British India, was crucial for the British Empire; therefore, the British could not accept these efforts by the Ottomans and the Germans.

A British lieutenant named Bramly was sent with a small troop of Egyptian policemen to the Gulf of Aqaba, which had been administered solely by the Ottomans since 1892, to establish several police stations there. A post was provisionally set up in present-day Eilat but had to be dissolved shortly afterward on orders of the Ottoman commander of Aqaba. Bramly's expedition was described as a "friendly" attempt to clarify the course of the border between Ottoman and Egyptian territory, claiming that this clarity was necessary, as they allegedly had never received the Inheritance Firman map and the border had never been precisely defined, but presumably ran somewhere in this area. Similar attempts at other planned locations — especially the strategically important Taba on the western shore of the gulf, which the British asserted was "undoubtedly" within Egyptian territory — were abandoned after it was discovered that the Ottomans already had troops stationed there and were amassing more forces, eventually numbering over 2,000 men.

Upon discovering the Ottoman troops, Bramley and his men barricaded themselves, along with reinforcements under the command of the former Egyptian commander of Aqaba, on Pharaoh's Island, prompting the British to send the protected cruiser HMS Diana to the Gulf. Another protected cruiser, HMS Minerva, was dispatched to Rafah after the British discovered that the Ottomans had torn down the boundary markers earlier relocated by the British, gathered several hundred troops there as well, and replaced some British telegraph poles with Ottoman ones to indicate that, in their view, the region southwest of Rafah was Ottoman territory.

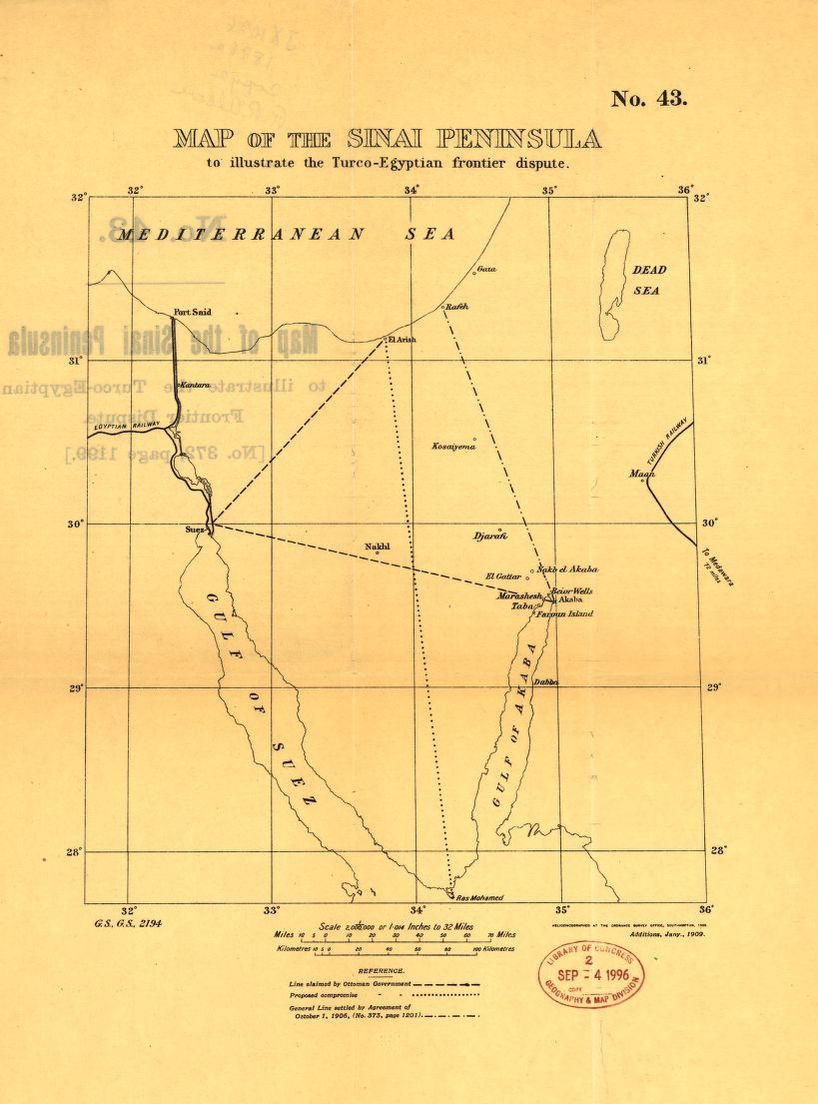
The British border claim and the two Ottoman compromise proposals

Attempts to resolve the emerging crisis diplomatically were unsuccessful. The British insisted that the border between Egyptian territory and the Ottoman heartland ran from Rafah to Aqaba — "the invention of a moment [...], it had never been heard of before." The Ottomans, while making two compromise proposals to redefine the borders, which were not accepted by the British, maintained that at least some parts of the Sinai belonged to them instead of the Egyptians. Thereupon, the French and the Russians publicly pledged their support to the British Empire. At the same time, it was feared by Lord Cromer and claimed by the Ottomans that in the event of war, the Germans would side with the Ottomans, although Germany officially denied this. In fact, diplomatic papers even suggest that Germany, on the contrary, threatened to withdraw its support from the Ottomans if they did not soon yield to British pressure.

When even the support of France and Russia for the British proved ineffective and the Ottomans threatened to put the issue forward for international arbitration, the British quickly issued an ultimatum to the Ottomans in May 1906: either withdraw from Taba and accept the border from Rafah to Aqaba, or they would occupy the strategically important Ottoman-Greek islands, including Lemnos and Imbros near the Ottoman capital Constantinople, and block all Ottoman maritime traffic in the Mediterranean.

British warships were already underway when the Ottomans finally yielded a few hours after the ultimatum had expired, and both sides established a boundary from Rafah to Aqaba in 1906. This line, however, was legally not an international border, but merely an administrative boundary between two Ottoman territories. This distinction was underscored by a British letter to the Sultan, reaffirming that Egypt was still recognized as an Ottoman province under the sovereignty of the Ottoman Empire.

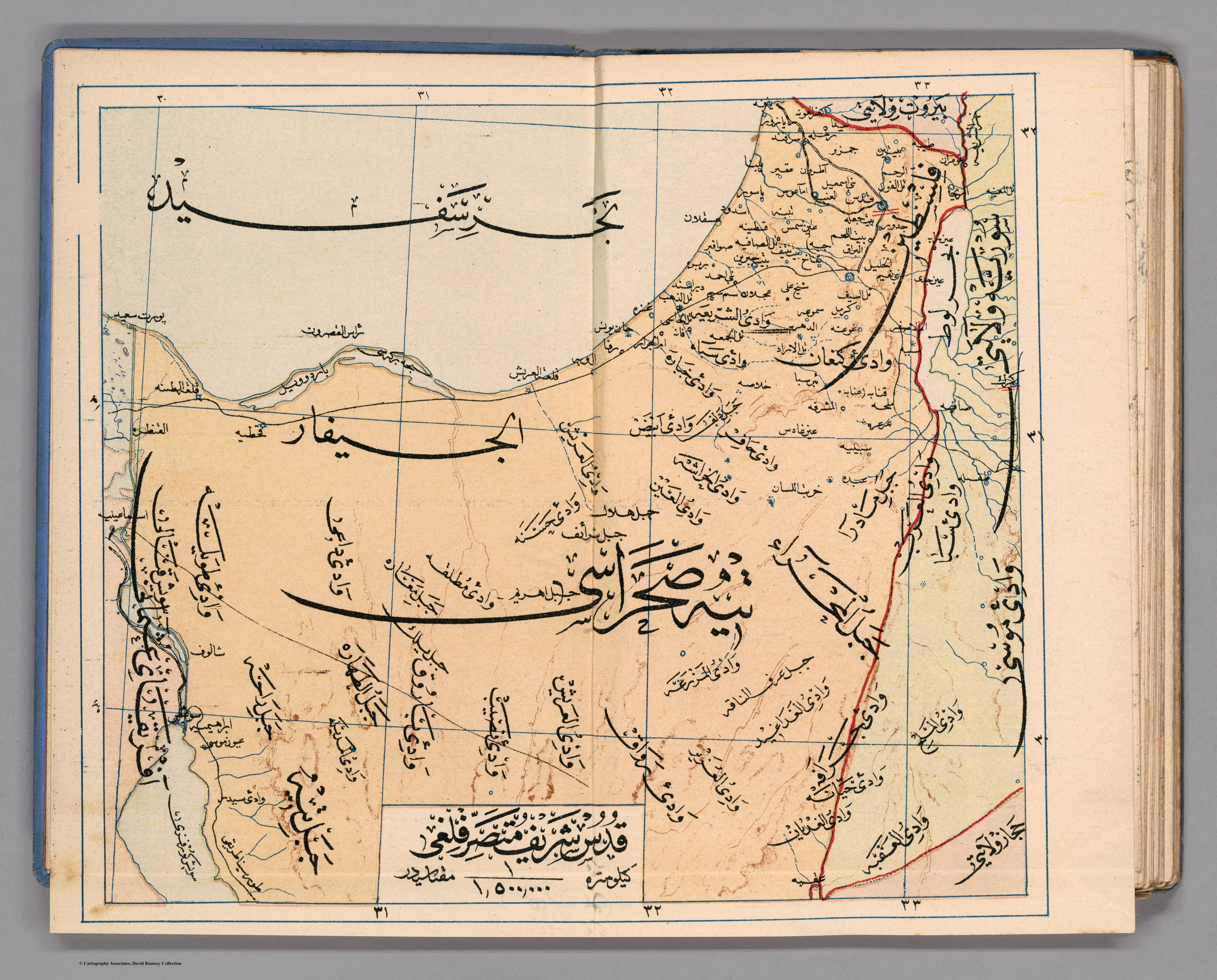
Ottoman map from 1907 and 1912. The map as a whole is labeled "District of Jerusalem." Egypt is not mentioned; instead, the area west of the Gulf of Suez is referred to as "Ottoman Africa."

Thus, the border question continued to linger even after 1906. For instance, in 1907, the British, once more trying to extend their sphere of influence northward with the help of Zionists, encouraged the Anglo-Palestine Jews Club to establish a "colony of British Jews at Gaza." When this attempt failed, the British consular agent in Gaza launched a similar project, aiming to purchase around 5000 hectares of land at the new Egyptian-Palestinian border near Rafah for another Jewish colony, which would have at least contributed to stabilizing the border. This attempt also failed, as the Egyptians did not want a Jewish colony on their land either. Simultaneously, the Ottomans began producing maps that depicted a somewhat fictitious administrative geography by including the entire Sinai Peninsula within the Sanjak of Jerusalem. Nevertheless, the issue remained dormant and truly new developments occurred only from 1919 onwards, when Britain sought the Mandate for Palestine after World War I.

During the Taba Crisis, the Egyptians firmly sided with the Ottomans, leading to vitriolic attacks against the British in nationalist Egyptian newspapers. In this way, the Taba Crisis set the stage for the Denshawai incident later that same year, which is, in turn, considered the turning point in opposition to British rule in Egypt.

== Aftermath: The inclusion of the Negev in Mandatory Palestine ==
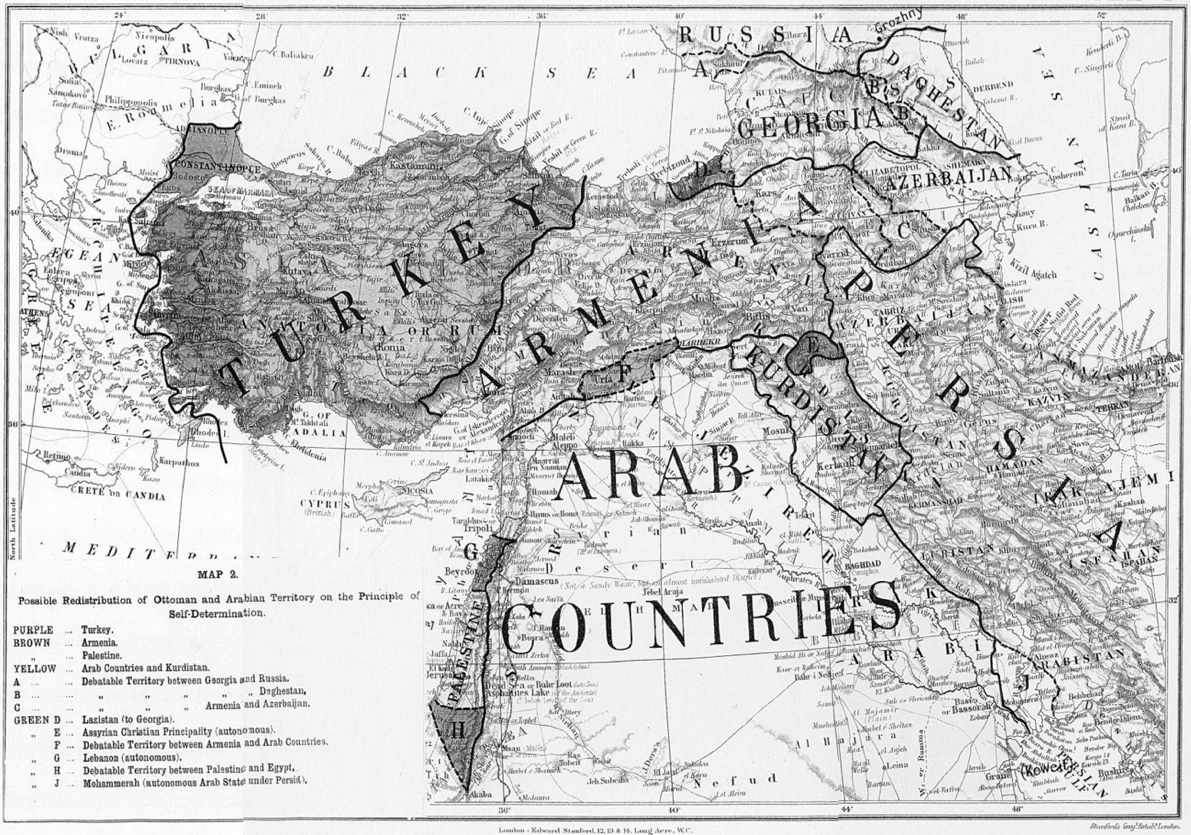
A map considered by the British Cabinet in 1918 suggested that the Negev could be included in either Palestine or Egypt.

During World War I, to increase their chances of being granted the Mandate for Palestine after the war, the British government issued or signed the McMahon–Hussein correspondence, the Sykes–Picot Agreement and Balfour Declaration. Taken together, these meant that, according to the vision of the French and British, the Negev, Jordan, and Hejaz would once again be politically "united", but this time as part of the externally controlled greater Kingdom of Arabia. However, the British did not regard either these agreements or the recently established border agreement as binding. Thus, once they were granted the mandate in 1919, Britain adopted the Ottoman view that the newly drawn boundaries had merely been administrative borders between two Ottoman territories, and began to consider various options for alternative border demarcations in the south of Palestine anew.

The Negev question was negotiated primarily on two occasions. The border between Egypt and "non-Egypt" was the subject of negotiations from 1917 to 1919 in the lead-up to the Paris Peace Conference. The Zionists demanded the territory east of a line from the Gulf of Aqaba to el-Arish; however, this was concealed under British pressure with the wording "a frontier to be agreed upon with the Egyptian government." The British themselves considered various options, most notably the "Egyptian solution," which would have assigned the Negev, including Gaza and Beersheba as the two economic centers of the Bedouins, along with the fertile farmland of the Bedouins east of Gaza and el-Arish, to Egypt. The provisional retention of the 1906 border was ultimately a compromise, chosen mainly because it was already marked on maps and needed no additional investment of resources. However, even as late as 1947, Britain did not view this border as final and, while still hoping to retain control over the Negev, even considered reassigning the rest of the Sinai Peninsula to the Negev. This compromise border only achieved the status of an official international border around 1979 with the Camp David Accords. Galilee reports that as of 2019, Bedouins still regarded the regions on both sides of the arbitrarily drawn national border as a single region.

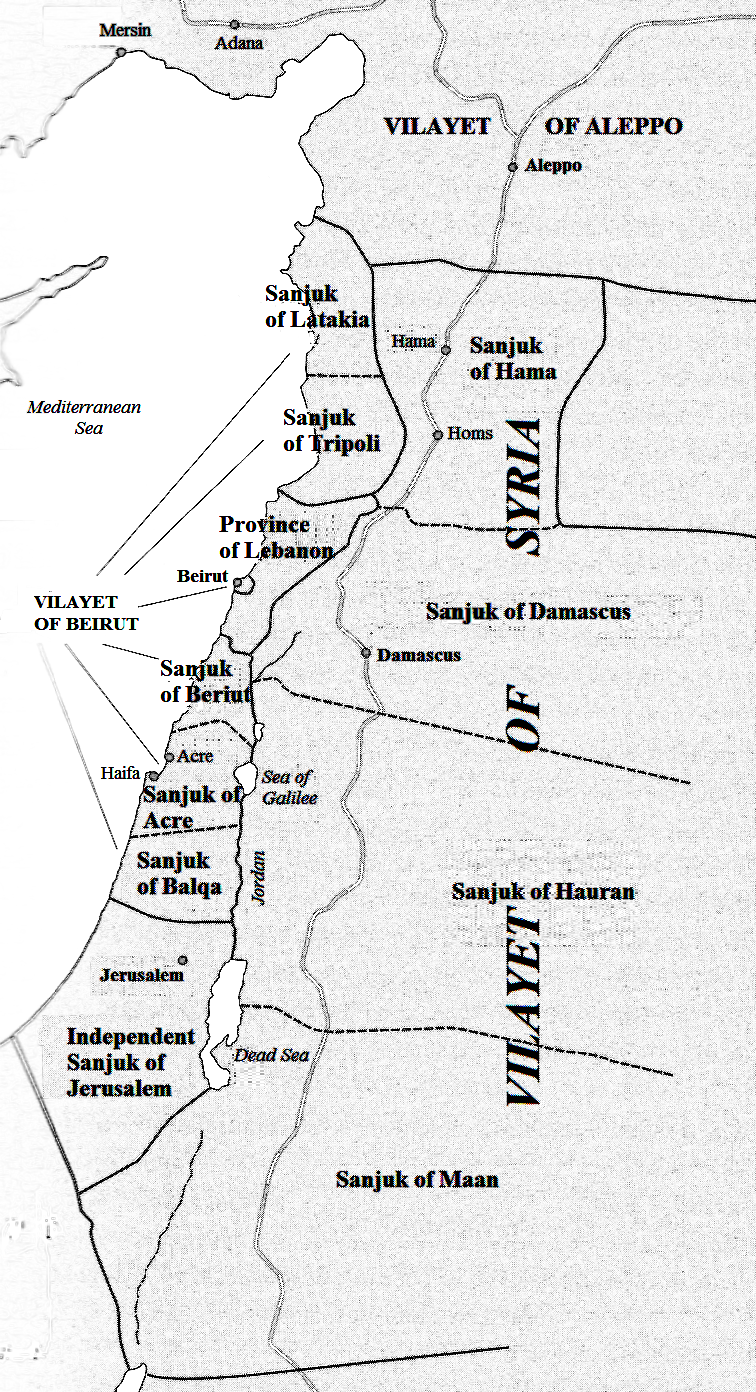
Ottoman administrative boundaries before 1917

In 1922, the Negev was again the subject of negotiations, as the borders between Palestine and the territory of the designated Jordanian King Abdullah had to be drawn. His father, Hussein, King of Hejaz, had been promised the Negev by the British, among other things, in the McMahon-Hussein Correspondence. Here too, this (already promised) maximum demand of the Jordanians was met with a maximum demand of the Zionists, who also wanted the fertile highlands east of the Jordan Rift Valley for their national Jewish homeland. Again, the Zionists did not have to make significant concessions, as a compromise was decided by the British, according to which the border should run along the middle of the Jordan River. The promised Negev land was not relinquished by King Abdullah himself, but by British representative St John Philby "in Trans-Jordan's name". Philby's ability to concede the region to the Zionist Organization was based on the argument that Abdullah had received permission from his father to negotiate the future of the Sanjak of Ma'an (which had previously been a part of the province of Hejaz). Even if this was true, this was not the position of Abdullah, who made a request for the Negev to be added to Transjordan in late 1922, which was rejected by the British. Thus, despite not having been historically considered part of the region, the Negev was added to the proposed area of Mandatory Palestine on 10 July 1922. In this case too, the final border was only established as international border in 1994 in the peace treaty between Israel and Jordan.
