= Tiyaha =

Negev Bedouin tribe

The Tiyaha or Tiyahah (Arabic: التياها) is a Negev Bedouin tribe. Their traditions state that they originated from near Medina and settled in the Sinai Peninsula during the early years of the Muslim conquests. They were led by one named Rabab and the five main sub-groups trace their roots to his five sons.

Al-Tiyaha bedouins along with "Al-Badara bedouins" are thought to be the indigenous pre-Islamic bedouins of Negev and Sinai. Probably related to ancient biblical Arabians who inhabited the area like the Nabateans and the Arabs. Their alleged Arab ancestry is mysterious and despite claiming a Najdi Arabian origin, their surrounding Arab neighbors like the Tawarah bedouins to the south and Tarabin bedouins to the north see them as foreigners. They are recorded to be the oldest Arab tribe to arrive and settle Sinai due to the Islamic conquest of Egypt.

Their name "Al-Tiyaha" came from the Al-Tih plateau (in Arabic: هضبة التيه) which means the "lost land" and this is a very strange occasion since Arab tribes usually don't change their name to the name of the region easily.

At-Tih plateau is an isolated unwanted desert, a perfect shelter for a fleeing people who were displaced from their homelands by new settlers.

== Sub-Groups ==
=== The Hukuk ===
Formerly the paramount clan, the Hukuk grazed the land from Jebel al-Khalil (Hebron) to Wadi al-'Araba, south of the Dead Sea and taxed anyone wishing to cross their territory. In the 1930s their leader was one Sheikh Salman whose grandfather had been hung by the Turkish authorities for abducting women and levying illegal dues on bedouin around Gaza.

=== The 'Allamat ===
In the 1930s this clan numbered less than 2,000. After the British authorities put their Sheikh, Salama ibn Musa Abu Shunnar, in prison for "misbehaviour" they split into three sub-groups, each with their own Sheikh.

=== 'Iyal 'Umari ===
Taking their name from one of Rabab's sons called 'Umari who had a reputation as a Tiyaha war leader. Despite this he has an evil reputation and his grave on the left bank of Wadi al-Abya regarded as a place of bad-omen. In the 1930s the clan numbered some 500, divided into two sub groups: The 'Urur and the Rawashida.

=== The Nutush ===
Also known as the 'Atawina and abushareb. One of their Sheikhs, Salim, was killed fighting . Exceeding 2,000 in 1930, they were one of the senior branches of the Tiyaha. In the nineteenth century they levied taxes on the people of Gaza and Hebron. Two of their Sheikhs, 'Awda and 'Amir, played a leading role in the war with the Tarabin, which weakened their influence over other sections of the Tiyaha including the Hukuk leading tribe Alhuzayyel. During the early years of the twentieth century they were led by Shaykh Ali ibn 'Atiya, who was widely respected, serving on local official bodies as well as the General Council in Jerusalem. Unusually he sent his sons to school.

=== The Qadirat ===
Numbering 4,000: during the early years of the British occupation a number of them, under the leadership of Ibrahim ibn Mohammed, committed numerous acts of lawlessness, living as outlaws until making peace with the government. Many of the residents of Lakiya, north of Beersheba, identify themselves as Qadirat.

=== The Dhullam ===
The grave of one of their ancestors, Mahna, in Wadi al-Hafir is a place of pilgrimage. Numbering 2,000 in 1930, they had a reputation as fighters. They lost eighty horsemen in one engagement with the Tarabin during the nineteenth century.

=== Other sub-groups ===
A number of other tribes and clans were allied to the Tiyaha: The Shallaliyin (1,000); The Bani 'Uqbah living around Beersheba; The Qatatiwa also arriving in the Negev in the early nineteenth century; The Qalazin (200) and the Badinat (350).

== Nineteenth century ==
In 1843 a Scottish missionary was amongst a small group that set out from Cairo to explore possible routes taken by Moses across Sinai. Their itinerary included Saint Catherine's Monastery, central Sinai, then East to Petra and to Jerusalem via Hebron. In Cairo they hired a guide and 47 camels from the Aleika bedouin, a branch of the Tawarah bedouin. For part of their journey West from Suez they were accompanied by Sheikh Saleh, the leader to the Tawarah, who was based in Wadi esh Sheikh west of Mount Sinai. North West of Saint Catherine's, near the fort at Nakhl where the Haj road enters Jebel Tih, their progress was stopped by a large group of Tiyaha who refused to allow the Tawarah to cross their territory. In the negotiations that followed it was agreed that the Tawarah would continue to Gaza with half of the party and the Tiyaha would provide 20 camels to transport the rest to Petra and back as far as Dhahariya at a cost of 220 piasters per camel. The writer observed that the Tiyaha were armed with guns plundered from the retreating Egyptian army in 1841, and on the way back from Petra, south of the Dead Sea, they came across bones and complete skeletons of soldiers who had been attempting to reach Gaza. He comments on several occasions of finding areas of rye planted for grazing and that the Tiyaha were more observant about prayers than his previous escort. He does speculate this might be due to the appearance of a large comet during the journey. The Tiyaha's territory did not extend to Wadi 'Arabah, they had poor relations with the bedouin living there. Negotiations were required with the residents of Petra before the party were allowed to set up camp because of antagonism towards the escorts. On the way back across Wadi 'Arabah they were joined by four Tiyaha men escorting 40 camels from grazing East of Mount Seir which they were taking to Gaza to sell. The journey ended outside Dhahariya when the Tiyaha escort refused to enter the town due to a murder that had been committed in the recent past.

In an 1874 list of Bedouin tribes produced by a member of the Palestine Exploration Fund survey team, the Tiyaha are described as "in the Desert of the Tih".

In April 1875, Lieut. Claude R. Conder, who was surveying Gaza District for the Palestine Exploration Fund, reported that part of the territory belonging to the Tiyaha included 200 square miles north of Beersheba.
