= Clinton Bailey =

American-Israeli political scientist (1936–2025)

- קלינטון ביילי
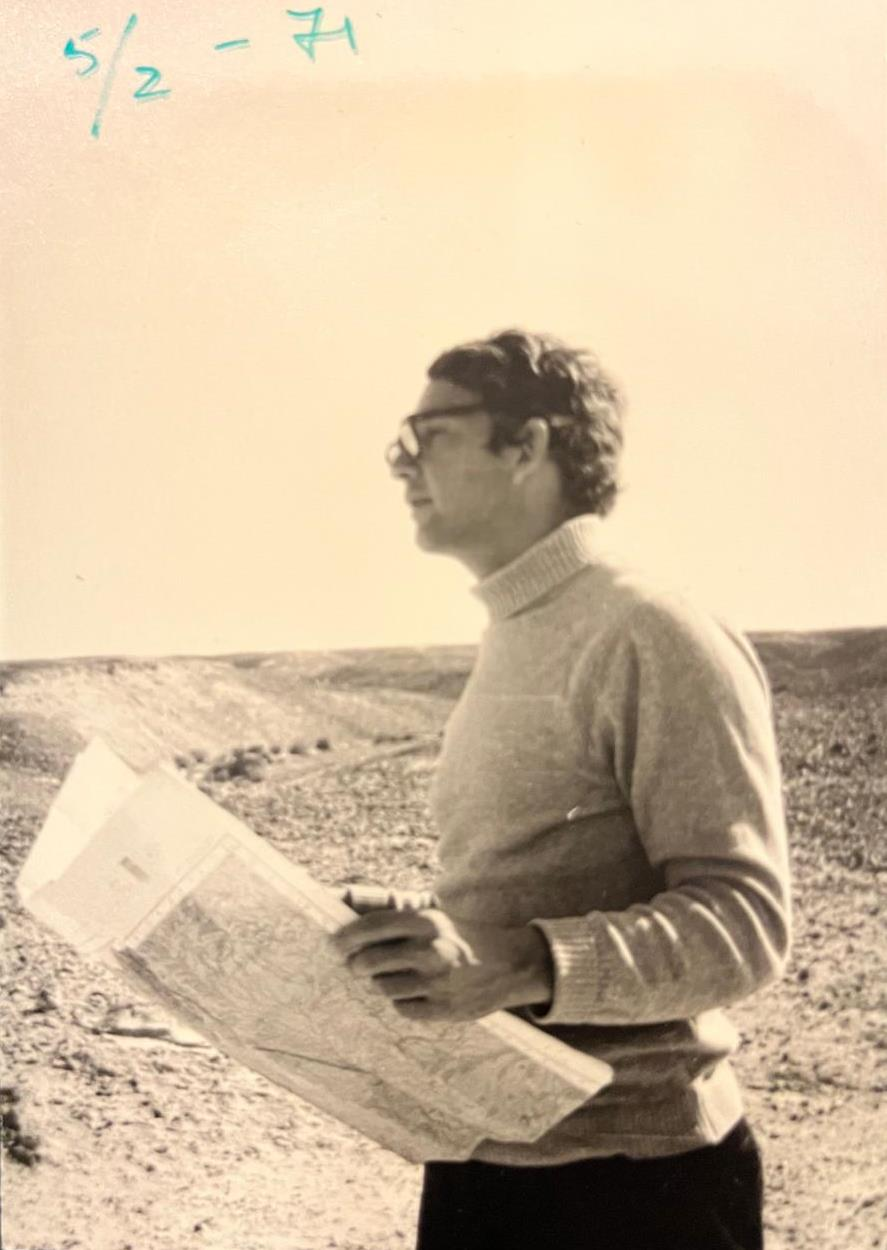
- Bailey in the Negev Desert in 1971
- Born: April 24, 1936; Buffalo, New York, United States
- Died: January 5, 2025 (aged 88)
- Occupation: Political scientist
- Known for: Study of Bedouins

Clinton Bailey (Hebrew: קלינטון ביילי; April 24, 1936 – January 5, 2025) was an American-Israeli political scientist.

He was an expert in Bedouin culture and poetry, and a founder of the Museum of Bedouin Culture in the Negev. He lived with the Bedouin people of the region from 1967 to 2012, and published the book Bedouin Culture in the Bible with Yale University Press in 2018.

Bailey died on January 5, 2025, at the age of 88.
