= Bani 'Uqbah =

Arab Qahtanite tribe

Bani 'Uqbah بني عقبة
- Qahtanite Arab tribe
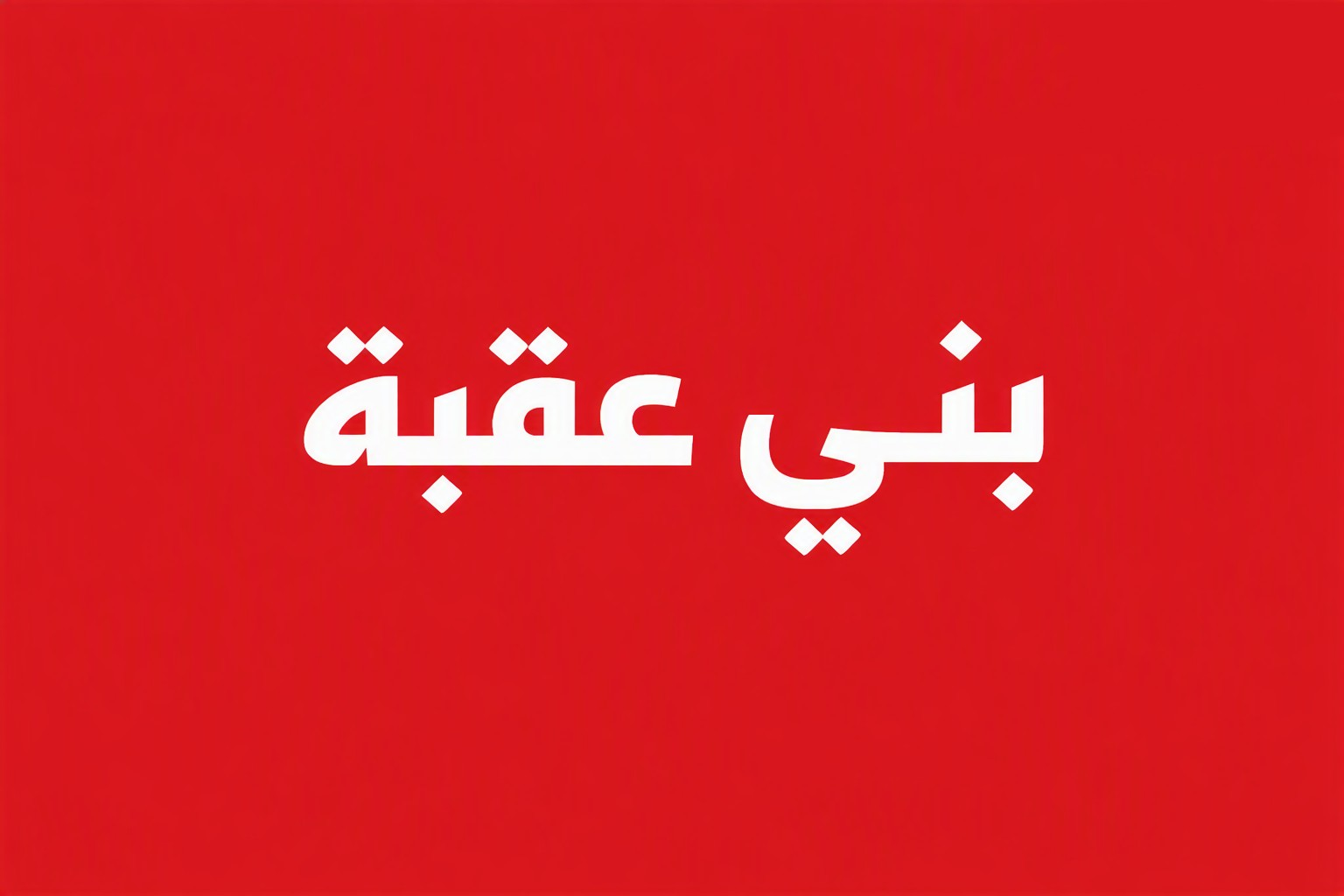
- Unofficial flag of Bani 'Uqbah, which is associated with the tribe.
- Ethnicity: Arab
- Nisba: Al-'Uqbi
- Location: Hejaz, Jordan, Palestine, Iraq, Sinai
- Descended from: Banu 'Uqbah ibn 'Ubayd ibn Malik ibn Suwayd ibn Zayd ibn al-Dubayb ibn Qurẓ ibn Ḥudhayfah ibn 'Amr ibn Ṣulay' ibn Nabīgh ibn 'Ubayd ibn Ka'b ibn Sa'd ibn Umayyah ibn Ghatafān ibn Sa'd ibn Ilyās ibn Ḥarām ibn Judham ibn 'Adī ibn al-Ḥārith ibn Murrah ibn Udad ibn Kahlan ibn Saba' ibn Yashjub ibn Ya'rub ibn Qaḥṭān
- Parent tribe: Judham of Kahlan of Qahtan
- Language: Arabic (Northwest Arabian dialect), Southern Levantine Arabic
- Religion: Sunni Islam

The tribe of Bani 'Uqbah (Arabic: بني عُقبة, romanized: Banī 'Uqbah) is an Arab Qahtanite tribe that is said to have descended from the ancient Judham tribe, one of the ancient Arab tribes known during the pre-Islamic period in Arabia and the Southern Levant. Historically, Bani 'Uqbah inhabited areas of the Northern Hejaz and the Southern Levant, with their influence spreading into the Sinai Peninsula and Egypt.

== Origins ==
The origins of Bani 'Uqbah are traditionally traced through the genealogical traditions of Arab historians. Medieval sources such as accounts from Ibn Khaldun, Al-Qalqashandi, and Al-Maqrizi describe Bani 'Uqbah as one of the branches of Judham.

Bani 'Uqbah became established in the northern Hejaz and the Southern Levant, where they had their own tribal identity amongst the branches of Judham. Accounts mention several branches of the tribe, which later became associated with different regions of the Middle East.

== Mamluk era ==
During the Mamluk period, Bani 'Uqbah became recognized as one of the Arab tribes who were responsible for protecting and maintaining security along important routes between Egypt, the Levant, and the Hejaz. Their leaders received allowances from the Mamluk authorities as a reward for their services. Ibn Khaldun describes the tribe's territory as extending from Al-Karak to Al-Azlam, (present-day Tabuk Province, near Duba). Additionally, Ibn Fadlallah al-Umari accounts that their lands stretch from the region of Al-Karak into the northern Hejaz, particularly near Tabuk and Tayma.

The amirs of the tribe held recognized status among the Arab leaders of the region. One of their notable leaders was Shutay ibn 'Uqbah, who received significant privileges from the Mamluk Sultan of the time, al-Nasir Muhammad ibn Qalawun, including land grants, allowances, and a robe of honor.

During the early 14th century, the tribe played a role in political conflicts surrounding Mecca. In 1314-1316 CE, Bani 'Uqbah supported the Sharif Rumaythah ibn Abi Numayy against his rival Humayda ibn Abi Numayy, joining other Arab tribes in the conflict near Mecca, reflecting their influence and military importance in the region during the Mamluk period.

== Modern era ==
In the modern period, the tribe is still a recognized Arab tribal community with branches distributed across parts of the northern Arabian Peninsula, the Southern Levant, and Egypt. Their traditional areas of settlement and movement have changed over time due to political changes, the establishment of modern borders, economic changes, and the decline of older tribal responsibilities such as protecting pilgrimage routes to the Hejaz.

Today, communities remain present across their historical territories in Northwestern Arabia, (including areas around Tabuk and Makna), as well as throughout the Southern Levant, particularly near Al-Karak, with branches also found in parts of Egypt and Iraq.

== Al-Masalmah ==
Al-Masalmah (Arabic: المسالمة) are one of the major branches of Bani 'Uqbah, they are mostly in the Northern Hejaz, around the Tabuk Province.

=== Branches of Al-Masalmah ===
- Al-Zubun (Arabic: الزبون)
- Al-Haramilah (Arabic: الحراملة)
- Al-Jubur (Arabic: الجبور)
- Al-Lihyan (Arabic: اللحيان)

== Al-'Amr ==
Al-'Amr (Arabic: العمرو) are one of the major branches of Bani 'Uqbah. They originated from the northern Hejaz and later migrated north into the Southern Levant, becoming one of the prominent tribal groups in the Al-Karak region of modern Jordan, with branches also present in Palestine.

=== Branches of Al-'Amr ===
- Al-Thubaytat (Arabic: الثبيتات)
- Al-'Amawiyah (Arabic: العماوية)
- Al-'Arinat (Arabic: العرينات)
- Al-Lahawiyah (Arabic: اللحاوية)
- Al-Zughaylat (Arabic: الزغيلات)
- Al-Lasaymah (Arabic: اللصايمة)
- Al-Jaradat (Arabic: الجرادات)
- Al-Hanahinah (Arabic: الحناحنة)
- Al-Shabul (Arabic: الشبول)
- Al-Badrayn (Arabic: البدراين)
- Al-Sawahra (Arabic: السواحرة)
- Al-Shunaykat (Arabic: الشنيكات)
- Al-Shayhan (Arabic: الشيحان)
- Al-Ramamnah (Arabic: الرمامنة)
- Al-Matarik (Arabic: المتاريك)
- Al-Shawahin (Arabic: الشواهين)
- Al-Hamlan (Arabic: الهملان)
- Al-Tawahiyah (Arabic: الطواهية)
- Al-Kharsah (Arabic: الخرشة)

== Bani Wasil ==
Bani Wasil (Arabic: بني واصل) are one of the branches of Bani 'Uqbah, a branch from the Judham tribe. They originated from the northern Hejaz and later settled in the Sinai Peninsula, particularly around the Tur Sinai region and Wadi Feiran.

=== Branches of Bani Wasil ===
- Al-Hajayjah (Arabic: الحجايجة)
- Al-Jawabirah (Arabic: الجوابرة)
- Al-Mughabbish (Arabic: مغبش)
- Al-'Umariyyin (Arabic: العمريين)

=== Other Branches of Bani 'Uqbah ===
- Al-Manasir (Arabic: المناصير)
- Al-Masa'id (Arabic: المساعيد)
- Al-Barakat (Arabic: البركات )

== See also ==
- Bedouin
- Judham
- Arab
