= Valley of Tears =

Golan Heights battle site in 1973 Yom Kippur War

Coordinates: 33°10′37.97″N 35°48′6.11″E

- Part of the Yom Kippur War
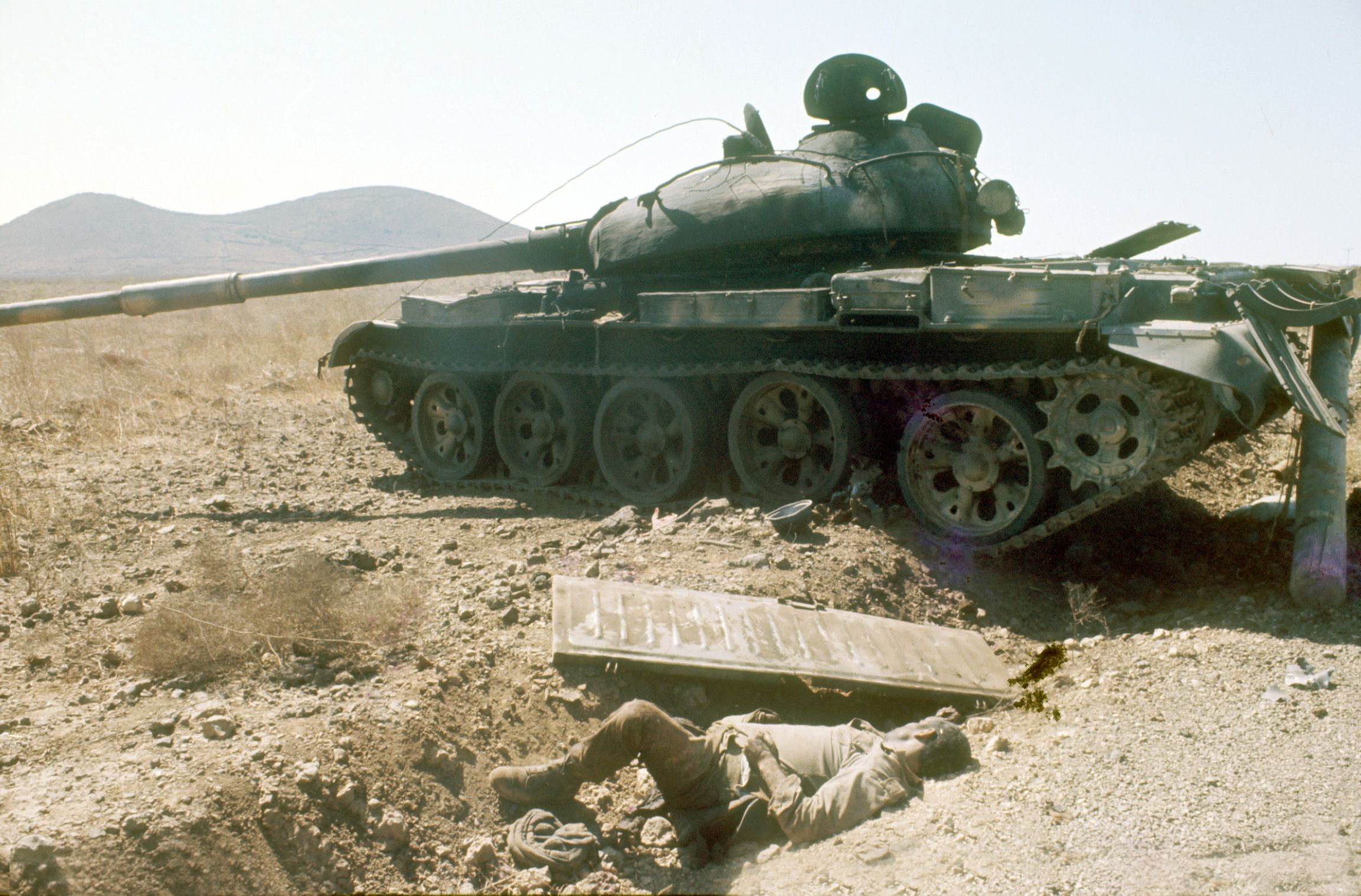
- Destroyed Syrian tanks in the Valley.
Date	6 – 9 October 1973
Location	Golan Heights
Result	Israeli victory

Belligerents
Israel	Syria

Commanders and leaders
Maj. Gen. Avigdor Ben-Gal; Col. Yitzhak Ben-Shoham †; Maj. Benjamin Katzin †	Brig. Gen. Omar Abrash †; Lt. Col. Mustafa Sharba

Strength
1 armored brigade (~100 tanks)	3rd Infantry Division; 7th Infantry Division; 9th Infantry Division (~500 tanks and vehicles)

Casualties and losses
60–80 Sho't Kal tanks and vehicles	500+ vehicles (260–300 T-55 and T-62 tanks)

The Valley of Tears (Hebrew: עֵמֶק הַבָּכָא, Emek HaBakha) is the name given to an area in the Golan Heights after it became the site of a major battle in 1973 during the Yom Kippur War, known as the Valley (or Vale) of Tears Battle, which was fought from 6 October to 9 October. Although massively outnumbered, the Israeli forces managed to hold their positions and on the fourth day of the battle the Syrians withdrew, just as the Israeli defences were almost at the point of collapse.

== Background ==
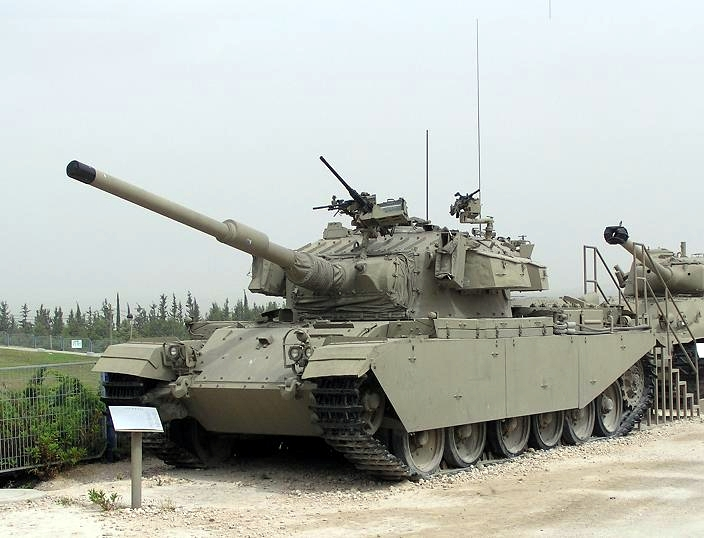
An Israeli Sho't Kal, an upgraded Centurion tank

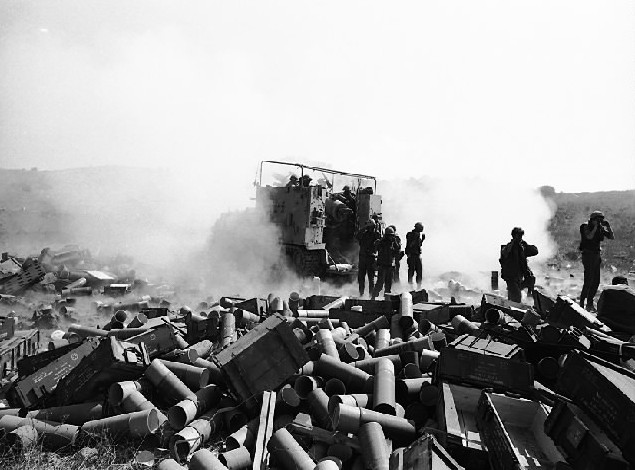
The Valley of Tears battle

On Yom Kippur eve (5 October), the Israeli 7th Brigade was ordered to move one battalion to the Golan Heights to strengthen the Barak Armored Brigade, under the command of Yitzhak Ben Shoham. The brigade commander Avigdor Ben-Gal concluded that something would happen on Yom Kippur. He ordered his artillery troops to survey the area and prepare targets and firing tables. He held a meeting with his battalion commanders to go over the main points of the operational plans that were previously implemented in the Israeli Northern Command. Without notifying his superiors, he took them on a tour of the front line. By 12:00 on Yom Kippur, 6 October, the brigade was concentrated in the Naffakh area. Naffakh was an important military base at the junction of the Petroleum Road, which crosses diagonally the northern Golan Heights, and a road which leads down to the strategic Bnot Yaakov Bridge over the Jordan River and into northern Israel.

Israeli Intelligence estimated that Syria had more than 900 tanks and 140 batteries of artillery immediately behind the Syrian line. The Syrian 7th Division was one of the units ready to attack. The actual number of Syrian tanks was about 1,260. Each Syrian infantry division had one infantry brigade, one mechanized infantry brigade, and one armoured brigade. The infantry and mechanized infantry brigades each had three infantry battalions, a battalion of forty tanks, an anti-aircraft (AA) artillery battalion and a field artillery battalion. The armoured brigade had three battalions of forty tanks each. The division also had a regiment of division field artillery, a divisional AA field artillery regiment, a reconnaissance regiment with a company attached to each brigade and a chemical company with a section attached to each brigade. The total force of the division was about 10,000 men, 200 tanks, 72 artillery pieces, 72 anti-aircraft guns and surface to air missiles (SAMs). The 7th Division, under the command of Brigadier-General Omar Abrash, had about 80% of its tanks and armoured personnel carriers (APCs). There were also independent armoured brigades with about 2,000 men and 120 tanks each. One of the independent brigades attached to Abrash's division was a Moroccan brigade. In the rear were the 1st and 3rd Armored Divisions, with 250 tanks each. The Syrian attack force was backed by at least 1,000 artillery pieces.

The Syrian plan was for the 7th Division to break through near Ahmadiyeh in the north while the 5th Division did the same near Rafid in the south. This would lead to the double envelopment of most of the Israeli forces in the Golan. Each division was to advance in two echelons, the 7th Division to strike westward through El Rom and Wassett while the 5th Division advanced to the Arik Bridge north of the Kinneret. If the 5th Division broke through, or if both the 5th and 7th did, the 1st Division would drive between the 5th and 9th for Naffakh to attack the Israeli forces caught between the pincers of the 5th and 7th. The Israeli forces in the Golan were 170 tanks and 60 artillery pieces divided between the 7th and the Barak brigades.

== Prelude ==
At 10:00 on Yom Kippur (6 October), Ben-Gal and other brigade commanders convened with General Yitzhak Hofi in Naffakh, where Hofi told them that Intelligence was estimating the Syrians would attack that day, at around 18:00. The 7th Brigade was assigned as a reserve force around Naffakh and was to prepare for a counterattack in either the north or south sector, or to split and support both. Ben-Gal then drove to meet one battalion in Sindiana and address the officers. He called an orders group at Naffakh for 14:00, assuming it would give his second battalion enough time to organize. As they gathered to wait for him, the Syrian artillery and planes began to attack. Ben-Gal's men ran back to their battalions while Ben-Gal moved the headquarters out of the camp. After an hour, he was ordered to move to the northern sector in the Kuneitra area and to transfer the 2nd battalion to the southern sector, under the command of the Barak Brigade. The 7th Brigade was left in charge of the northern sector from Kuneitra northwards with two battalions.

As part of his usual strategy, Ben-Gal decided to maintain a reserve force and began building a third battalion. He transferred a company from one battalion and placed it under the command of his armoured infantry battalion, thus creating a third battalion framework with tanks. With reinforcements, the new battalion gradually became proper: Ben-Gal now had three battalions available for maneuvering purposes. He received Lieutenant-Colonel Yair Nafshi's 74th Battalion, which was in line with the fortifications in the northern sector. With Nafshi's battalion, the brigade had about 100 tanks. The first battalion was stationed on the Purple Line. The line began at the fortification A1, directly east of Mas'ade on the foothills of Mount Hermon, and ran south about six kilometres to Mount Hermonit.

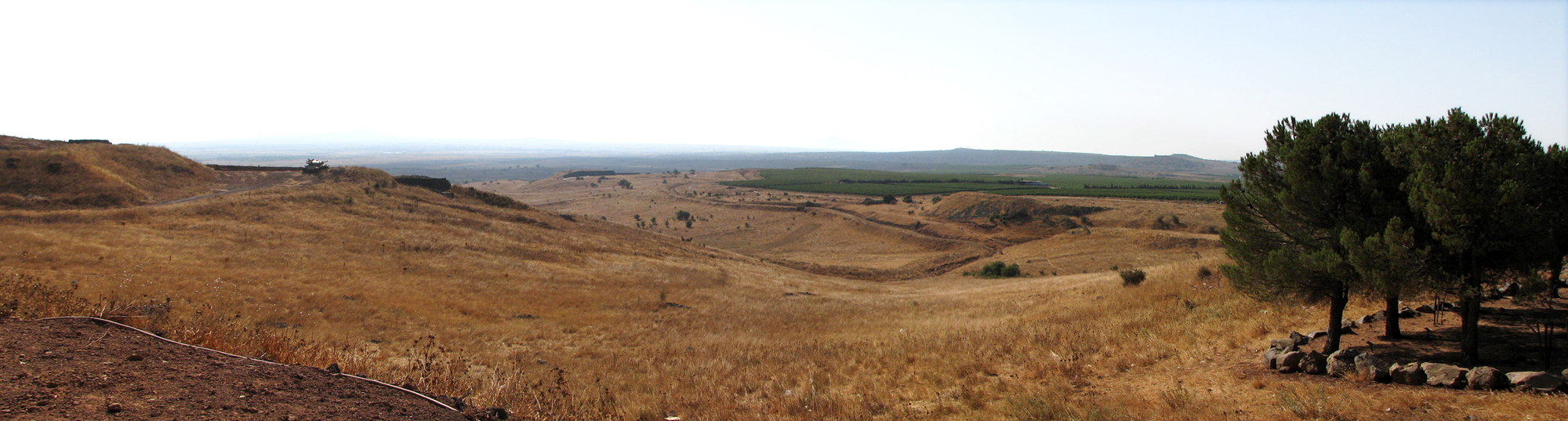
Valley of Tears in 2010

== Battle ==
=== First day ===
At 13:55, while Nafshi's sector came under a heavy artillery barrage, several soldiers along the Purple Line reported that the Syrians were removing the camouflage nets from their tanks and artillery. Ben Shoham ordered his battalion commanders, Nafshi and Oded Erez, to deploy their nearly 70 Centurion tanks in prepared battle positions. Nafshi was at Kuneitra when the order came to deploy his platoons and move his headquarters somewhere safer. He immediately ordered his troops to leave the town, and the tanks to advance while the soft vehicles fell back. Erez's 53rd Battalion was moved to the southern Golan. One of Nafshi's platoons of three tanks was near the Wassett crossroads when Syrian jets attacked Tel Abu Nida. When the jets departed, the crews began moving to the bunker line. After one kilometre, they came under large-calibre artillery fire. Before 14:00, Nafshi reported to his brigade headquarters that his battalion was ready for combat and was manning the Booster Ridge.

The Syrian 85th Infantry Brigade assault column reached the Israeli anti-tank ditch before its officers noticed that the engineers were not in the vanguard. They decided to dismount tank crewmen and mechanized infantrymen and rush them on foot to improvise crossings. This halted the attack in full Israeli view and exposed the men to Israeli fire. Nafshi ordered his men to destroy the bridging tanks. During the afternoon the Israelis destroyed most of the Syrian bridging tanks within sight, putting them out of action with shots fired at a range of 1.8 km (2,000 yd). Only two of the bridging tanks managed to reach the anti-tank ditch north of A3. The Syrians threw two bridges and a company of ten tanks crossed the ditch. The Israeli Air Force (IAF) was called into action, but many planes were shot down.

The first close combat commenced in the 74th Battalion's northernmost sector, against the Moroccan Brigade of thirty tanks. One Israeli Centurion was hit, and an Israeli platoon that was sent northward to guard the Dan Road was caught between the Moroccans moving against Tel Shaeta and a Syrian battalion closing in from the west. Avner Landau's company, now with seven Centurions, was also threatened and could not help. Nafshi delegated the area north of Hermonit to his deputy, Major Yosef Nissim, and reinforced the sector with Captain Eyal Shaham's company, leaving a company from the Armor School Tank Battalion as a tactical reserve. Every Barak Brigade Centurion in the northern Golan was committed in forty minutes. Nissim ordered Shaham to reinforce the trapped platoon around Tel Shaeta, and ordered his deputy, Lieutenant Asaf Sela, to cover the area south of Tel Shaeta, which could provide easy access to Hermonit, with one platoon. The Moroccans continued to fire at Tel Shaeta but did not advance, and the Syrian battalion was stopped when its leading vehicles were destroyed on the roadway. The Syrian battalion commander decided to move southward and try to penetrate between the Dan Road and Hermonit. He was unaware that he was moving between the forces of Shaham and Sela, who prepared a trap. They opened fire just before 15:00, using superior positions. After a little more than two hours, the Syrians withdrew, leaving behind their bridging tanks, a bulldozer tank, two BRDMs and six main battle tanks. Shaham's company lost two Centurions. Just before nightfall, Shaham noticed three SU-100 gun carriers and a truck close to Nissim's position, from which Nissim could not engage them. Shaham directed Sela, who could not see the Syrians, to intercept them. Sela, accompanied by one other Centurion, opened fire at the rear of the Syrian force and destroyed them at a range of 200 to 300 meters. Two Syrian tanks attempted to cross the open ground to the anti-tank ditch in the unguarded area south of Nissim's sector. The Syrian companies began moving toward that area, hoping to cross just before nightfall. As darkness fell, Nafshi ordered one company to move forward towards the Syrian bridges across the ditch to destroy the tanks that had crossed. The Syrian company that crossed was hit by Landau's tanks and destroyed after half an hour. The bridgehead was sealed.

In late afternoon, Hofi decided that the Barak Brigade's 65 tanks could not contain the Syrian attack alone, and committed the 7th Brigade's 105 Centurions. Believing that the northern sector was more crucial than the southern sector because of the Kuneitra Gap, he ordered Ben Gal to assume command of the area from Bunker 107 northward. The Barak Brigade was now put in charge of the southern sector, already occupied by Erez's 53rd Battalion. The 74th Battalion was transferred to the 7th Brigade, while the newly arrived 82nd Battalion, under the command of Captain Meir "Tiger" Zamir, and two companies from the newly arrived 75th Armored Infantry Battalion from the 7th Brigade to the Barak Brigade. Avigdor Kahalani's 77th Battalion, which was familiar with the terrain after having worked there for a week, was returned to the 7th Brigade. Ben-Gal decided to create a personal reserve by attaching one company of the 82nd Battalion to the 7th Brigade's headquarters. After an hour, the 82nd Battalion was transferred to the Barak Brigade.

By nighttime, Nafshi was placed under the command of the 7th Brigade. The Syrians kept advancing in columns, using coloured lights and flags to distinguish units. Some of them struck Israeli minefields. The Israeli forces did not have adequate optical equipment for night fighting and had to gauge the position of the Syrian forces by their noise and artillery flares. Nafshi's battalion kept changing positions to avoid tank hunters. The fortifications were under heavy attack by tanks and infantry and were calling for help. Nafshi told them to go underground and provided them with supporting artillery fire.

Abrash committed his division's 78th Armored Brigade in the northern sector at 22:00. He was behind schedule, but expected to make up for it if the 78th Brigade could reach and secure the Kuneitra-Mas'ade Road, four and a half kilometres west of its starting line. It was believed that achieving this mission would cause the Israeli defences to collapse. Each of the 82nd Brigade's ninety-five T-55 tanks was equipped with a specially designed infrared nightscope. The night was brightly moonlit. The 82nd Brigade moved up the valley just two and a half kilometres from the Kuneitra-Masada Road. Ben-Gal used his artillery for illumination and ordered his men to remain silent until the Syrians were within range. By 22:00, the Syrian tanks were within 800 meters of the Israeli positions. Both sides lost tanks to the terrain. Captain Yair Swet, a 77th Battalion company commander, was ordered to move to Booster, losing two tanks. One crew managed to extricate its tank and use it to pull the other, but the delay distracted the battalion.

Lieutenant-Colonel Yosef Eldar, commander of the 75th Armored Infantry Battalion and responsible for the area penetrated by the 78th Brigade, was wounded, and Ben-Gal ordered Kahalani to assume responsibility. At this point, Kahalani's companies were scattered across seventeen kilometres between Hermonit and Bunker 109. One Syrian tank was discovered only after Kahalani ordered one of the companies to turn off their lights. A Syrian anti-tank unit tried to advance down the Bnot Yaakov Road, in front of Bunker 107, not knowing it was occupied. The Israelis opened fire and after a brief battle, the Syrians retreated. The 78th Brigade and its supporting units hunkered down.

Some may surmise this was due to the swift reaction time of the Israeli crews compared to the Syrian tank crews. As the Israelis were often firing at least two or more shells at the Syrians, this would prove a major factor in offsetting the disparity of the forces.

=== Second day ===
On the dawn of 7 October, the area between Hermonit and Booster was named "Valley of Tears" because of the great number of burning tanks lying across it. At 07:00, IAF Skyhawks began flying over the southern Golan. The first four came down from the southwest and within seconds, they were hit by Syrian SAMs. Several minutes later, another foursome approached and two were shot down. At 08:00, the 78th Tank Brigade of the 7th Division launched a second attack. It advanced along a 4-kilometre-wide front in the valley in the direction of Wassett. The 75th Battalion was fighting a Syrian brigade, at ranges varying from 9–2,100 m (10–2,300 yd). Meanwhile, the 74th Battalion in the north was attacked by two Syrian battalions, supported by an armoured infantry force in APCs, most of which were destroyed. The Syrian objective in this attack was a wadi running in the direction of Wassett along the base of Hermonit. Shaham was killed just before 13:00, a short time before the Syrians withdrew

The 77th Battalion was moved from south of Kuneitra to the central sector at Hermonit. Kahalani was ordered to leave a small force to the south to protect the brigade flank. The 74th Battalion, having lost about ten tanks, remained in the north. The company Kahalani left behind was attacked in the afternoon, but the attacking Syrian force of about twenty tanks was destroyed. The 7th Brigade lost three company commanders in the morning fighting, and over a dozen tanks were damaged or destroyed, none of which were replaced. Late in the day, Ben-Gal met with Kahalani and Eldar, who was wounded, on the southern slope of Booster to review the events. Meanwhile, Kahalani's deputy, Major Eitan Kauli, supported the forces fighting in that sector. With troops from the 75th Battalion, he began rearming, refuelling, and salvaging tanks and APCs. Three Centurions at a time were withdrawn from the front-line positions and worked over at Wassett. This gave the crewmen a chance to eat, drink, and rest and improved the brigade's morale.

The Syrians attacked the central sector again at 22:00 with artillery. The 7th Division was joined by the 64th and 66th Field Artillery Regiments with the 81st Brigade, led by T-62 tanks, which were turned over from the General Headquarters to allow Abrash to mount a new offensive around the Tapline-Wassett crossroads in the north-central Golan. The 81st Brigade arrived five hours after it was ordered out of the Kiswe, Syria Military Base. With 400 artillery pieces, the 85th Infantry Brigade was to commit a company of tanks and infantry to its divisional northern sector. The 78th and 81st Brigades were to commit over a hundred infantry-supported tanks in the divisional central sector, and the 121st Mechanized Brigade was to press some of its assault on Kuneitra with the help of BRDM-mounted Sagger anti-tank missiles. All units were to be equipped with anti-tank weapons, mostly Rocket-propelled grenades (RPGs). In total, about 500 tanks were to attack at 22:00.

Nafshi's force of five tanks at Bunker 107 was the first to report the new Syrian attack. Given the small size of his force, Nafshi's position was vulnerable when faced with this heavy attack, and his tank's turret was damaged. He decided to allow the T-62s to close in on his position to reduce the Syrian advantages of numbers and night vision. Close to 22:00, the Syrians approached within 450 meters of the bunker. He hit two tanks and whispered commands through his microphone. After four minutes, 25 Syrian tanks were destroyed and their attack was disturbed. Nafshi's force suffered no casualties. Most of the Syrian artillery fire fell on the Israeli units in the north. Kahalani warned his men to remain on the lookout for antitank squads.

The Israeli brigade, with fewer than 40 tanks, was facing approximately 500 Syrian tanks. Due to the Israelis' lack of night-fighting equipment, the Syrians reached within close range, and a battle commenced at ranges of 27–55 m (30–60 yd). The Syrian tanks and commandos bypassed the Israelis and destroyed many tanks with RPGs. At 01:00, the Syrians retreated, trying to evacuate damaged tanks and wounded. Ben-Gal struck the area with artillery and used the interval to refuel and reload. At 04:00, the Syrians renewed their attacks. This time, they attacked mainly with artillery and did not renew any major tank assaults. Only in the 7th Brigade's southern sector, the 7th Syrian Division 121st Mechanized Brigade was able to hold on.

At dawn, 130 Syrian tanks and many APCs were lying in the valley, many of them behind or between the Israeli positions. During the night, two Syrian infantry battalions attacked the position on Hermonit and were fought off by fewer than twenty Israeli infantry troops from the Golani Brigade. Dozens of bodies were left lying on the battlefield.

=== Third day ===
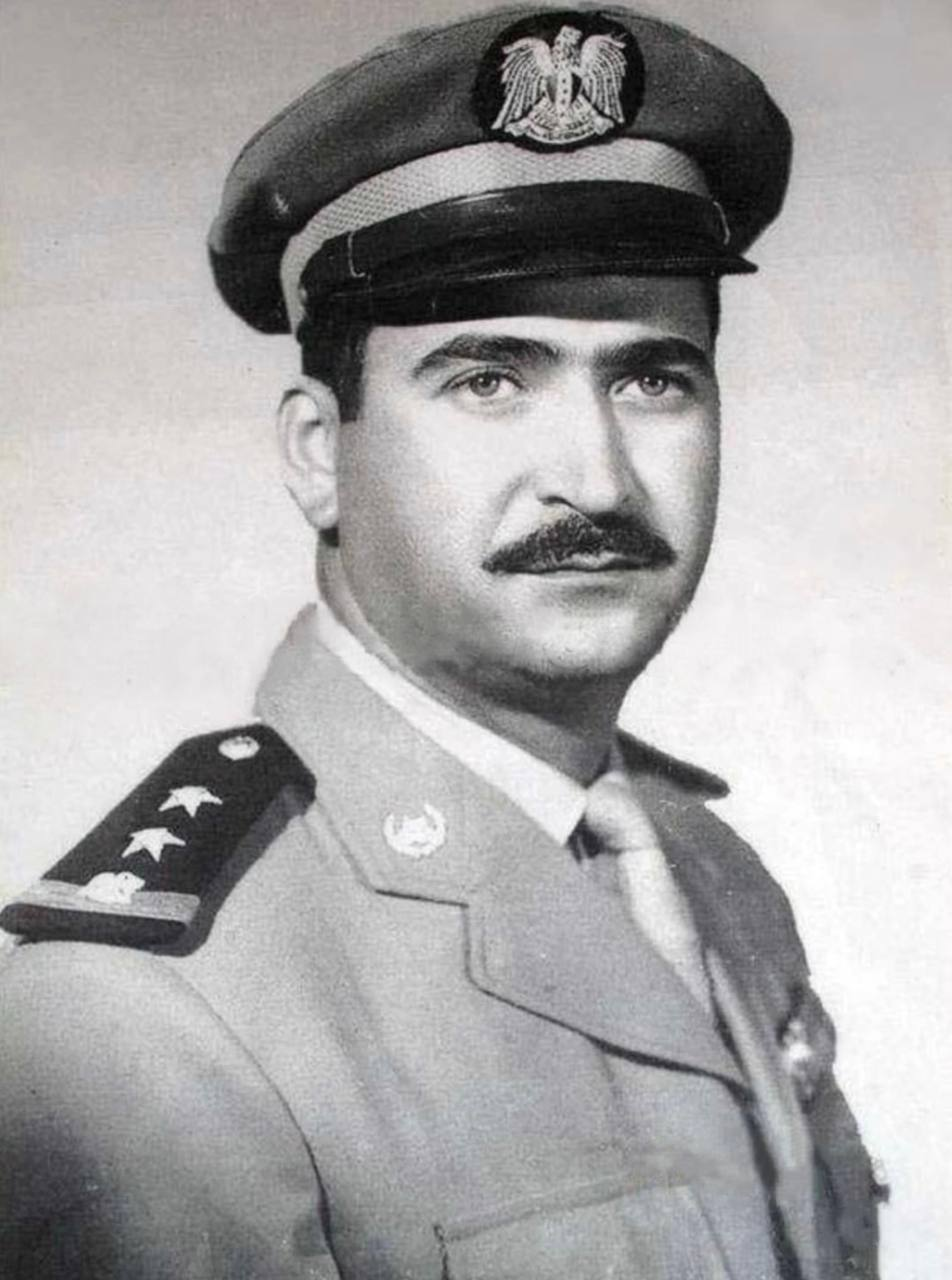
Image of the Omar Abrash, killed in this battle.

On 8 October, the Israeli 7th Brigade fought against elements of the Syrian 7th Division, the 3rd Armored Division and independent units, including the Republican Guard. On the brigade's southern flank, Zamir's company fought an armoured force that had entered the area during the night. Zamir's force of seven tanks held the attack and eliminated about thirty Syrian tanks, two APC companies and twenty vehicles. In the afternoon, three individual Syrian tank battalion concentrations with armoured infantry tried to break through in the Hermonit area. The Syrian artillery identified the Israeli positions and inflicted most of its casualties. The 7th Brigade lost about 50 dead and many wounded and were left with fewer than 45 working tanks. Ben-Gal decided to create a reserve of five tanks under the command of his operations officer, whom he ordered to move back about half a kilometre away and prepare to block a Syrian breakthrough.

At dusk, Abrash's tank was hit just as he was getting it ready for a new attack, and he was killed. At night, the Syrians attacked the central sector towards Booster. Ben-Gal ordered Zamir's company to counterattack from the flank and the rear of the enemy. Zamir's seven tanks managed to break the attack.

=== Fourth day ===
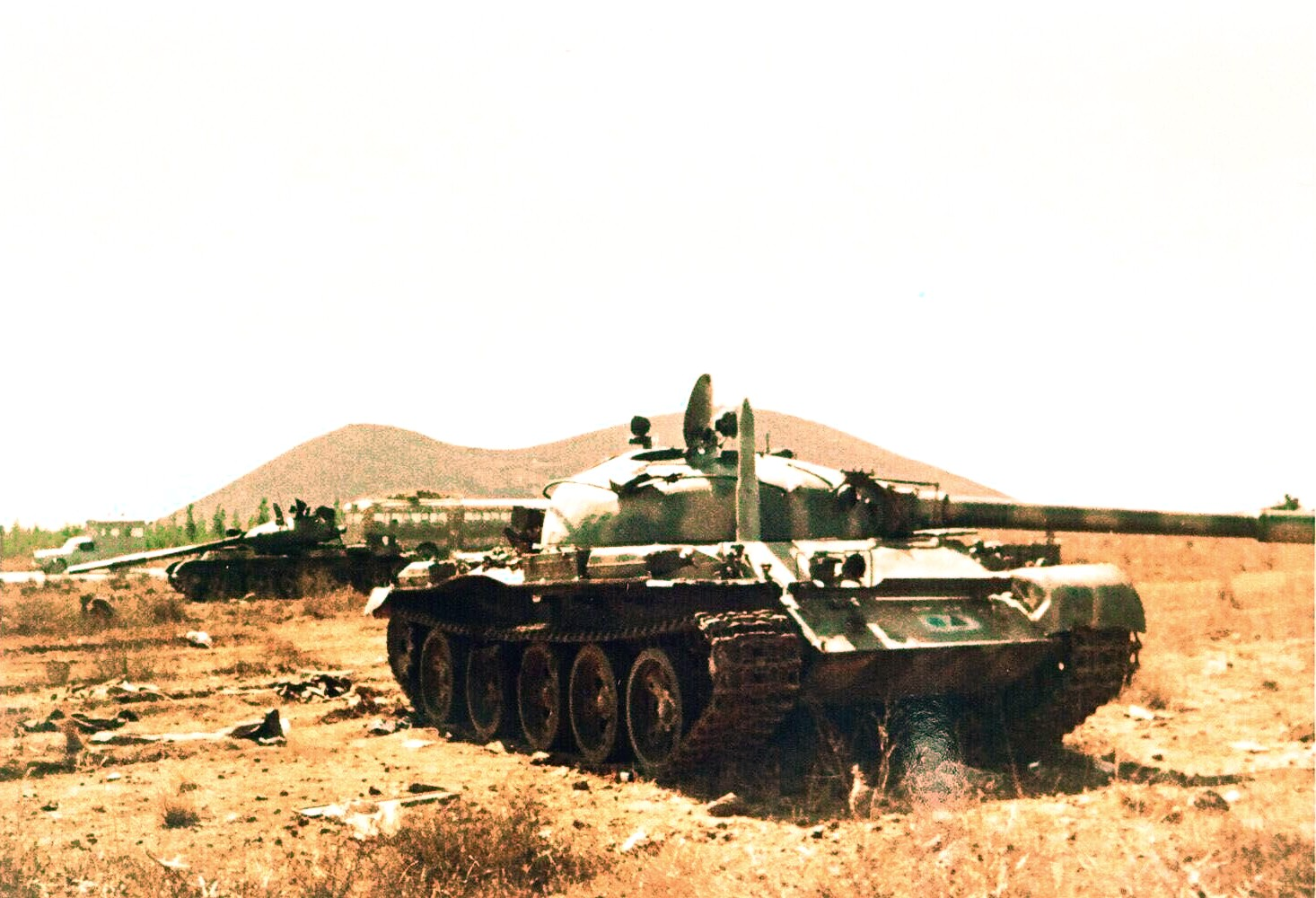
Abandoned Syrian T-62 tanks on the Golan Heights.

The Israeli Northern Command was trying to put together a command reserve, but could only assemble the survivors of the 53rd Battalion. The Barak Brigade had almost ceased to exist: Its commander and key staff officers were dead, and almost all of its troops and equipment were absorbed into other brigades. Lieutenant-Colonel Yossi Ben Hanan arrived the night before to take command of what was left of it. He had been the commander of the 53rd Battalion until two weeks earlier and was on his honeymoon when the war started. He was sent to reorganize the brigade. He teamed with Erez, who had escaped from Tel Faris on Monday morning, and Shmuel Askarov, the 53rd Battalion's deputy commander, to start repairing tanks. At 18:00, he reported to his division commander, General Rafael Eitan that he was ready to bring forward the thirteen Centurions he had repaired thus far, and was ordered to head for Naffakh. He was on his way when the IAF confirmed that about 100 Syrian tanks were headed toward the 7th Brigade's sector. One air photo depicted a complete Syrian battalion of thirty-eight T-62s and four BMPs.

At dawn on 9 October, the Syrians launched the heaviest artillery barrage thus far, using Katyusha rockets and MiG-17s. Seven Syrian helicopters flew over the Israeli positions to Buq'ata, where four of them discharged commando forces. At 08:00, a Syrian force of 100 tanks and a large number of APCs began to advance. The Israelis opened fire at maximum range but the Syrian advance continued. The Israeli commanders were exposed in their turrets and the artillery caused the number of casualties among them to grow significantly. Ben-Gal ordered his force to leave the high ramps and withdraw some 360 m (390 yd) to escape the artillery concentrations.

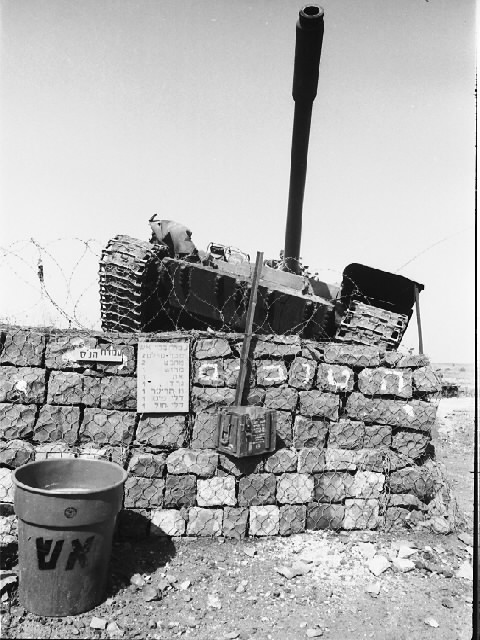
A destroyed Syrian T-55 tank at Naffakh on the Golan Heights.

Nafshi was ordered to join the 7th Brigade's area. He entered the battle with six tanks and was hit. He joined another tank and left A3. He ordered all the men under cover and requested Israeli artillery shelling of the position for protection. Later that day, he organized a supply convoy to A3. His tank was hit by a Syrian bazooka near Kuneitra and the tank behind him reported him dead. Nafshi continued with three APCs past Booster and entered A3 with the supplies.

When the Israeli 7th Brigade withdrew from the hill, the artillery stopped and Syrian tanks mounted the hill to fire at them. Ben-Gal's 7th Battalion had only six tanks and was acting as a brigade reserve, Nafshi had six tanks, and the operations officer was patrolling Buq'ata for the commandos. Zamir was fighting on Tel Git and was running out of ammunition, so he asked for permission to withdraw and reload. Ben-Gal refused at first but relented when he was told there was only one shell per tank. Ben-Gal consulted Eitan and decided to counterattack. The 7th Battalion began to move up the hill and saw the Syrian tanks. Kahalani called the other Israeli tanks behind the ramp and got little response since they were from different units and were operating on different frequencies. The brigade communications officer cut into every company's net, but they still did not respond to Kahalani. Kahalani's gunner knocked out the Syrian tank at the top of the hill, and another one was hit by an Israeli tank from the rear of the ramp.

In the north, the 74th Battalion was fighting with fewer than half its tanks. Ben-Gal feared that it might not be able to hold out, and ordered it to leave three tanks in the sector and move to the northern flank of the battle to face the Assad Republican Guard, which was trying to use the dead ground to move towards El Rom. The battalion commander was killed in this battle. Ben-Gal ordered the 77th Battalion to take command of the 74th Battalion. The 77th Battalion then fought two battalions of T-62 tanks that got by the 7th Brigade and were about 460 m (500 yd) behind it. The 77th Battalion moved to the high ground around the valley and destroyed the Assad Republican Guard force. All the forces in the central sector, down to only about fifteen tanks, were at this point under Kahalani's command, fighting at ranges of 230–460 m (250–500 yd) from their original positions on the ramps. The Syrians passed them and fired on them from behind. The 7th Brigade was fighting in all directions. Tanks from both sides got mixed up with the other side and struck by both sides' artillery fire. Several Syrian Mi-8 helicopters flew over the valley toward El Rom. At this point, Eitan heard that Syrian infantry was approaching Buq'ata, north of El Rom. If the 7th Division were to break through, it could join the infantry force and proceed to Dan and Kiryat Shmona, inside Israel.

Ben-Gal described the battle to Eitan and told him he was not sure he could hold on. Eitan asked him to hold on for another half-hour. At this point, the remaining eleven tanks of the Barak Brigade arrived, and Eitan directed them to Ben-Gal. Eitan told Ben-Gal of Ben-Hanan's force. Kahalani called Captain Emi Palant, the senior officer behind the ramps, to use a signal flag to get the tank commanders' attention and direct them to the ramp, but waving the flag got no response. Palant fired his machine gun at the side of the nearest tank to get the commander to look out, and the message was passed. He ran from tank to tank and rapped on their turrets to get their attention before returning to his tank and starting to move forward. No tank followed. Kahalani heard a sergeant from the 74th Battalion and ordered him to take his position and guard the wadi. The sergeant replied he did not have any shells left. Zamir, who was flanking his position to the south, reported a massive Syrian attack and asked for permission to move the remaining tanks to Zamir's company to a better position slightly to the south. Ben-Gal refused. Kahalani reported that he was unable to control the tanks, which kept drifting to the rear. Ben-Gal said he would try to get him more tanks. Kahalani ordered the sergeant to take his place, saying the Syrians would not try to attack if they saw his tank.

Kahalani moved towards the tanks behind the rampart and told their commanders to raise their flags if they heard him. He saw ten tanks, and most raised their flags. Two IAF planes accidentally bombed them, but none of the tanks were hit. On the southern sector, Zamir reported that he was out of ammunition and could no longer hold out on Booster. His force was left with two shells per tank. He radioed Ben-Gal that he could no longer hold on. Ben-Gal asked him for ten more minutes. Zamir's tank ran out of shells, and he began to fill his pockets with grenades and withdraw. Kahalani reached the tanks behind the ramps and told them they were going to retake the ramp. He started moving and a few other tanks slowly followed. Two Syrian tanks were knocked out, but the tanks behind him began to pull back. Ben-Gal informed him on the radio that several tanks, under the command of Eli Geva, were on their way.

Kahalani managed to convince the other tanks to follow him. The tank next to him hit a Syrian tank that came over the ramp. The tanks' hatches were open, and eventually, they could see the valley. Syrian tanks were moving forward, 50–910 m (55–995 yd) away. The Israeli tanks opened fire. Kahalani ordered them to shoot only at moving tanks. Geva's force reached the ramp and joined the battle. The Syrians fired a heavy artillery barrage. When it subsided, Kahalani could see no Syrian tanks moving ahead. Zamir had two tanks left and requested permission to withdraw, but Ben-Gal turned him down. He began to withdraw just as a force from the south, under the command of Ben Hanan, was arriving. Askarov took a position near Ben Hanan and the rest of the unit formed a battle line. Ben Hanan's face was wounded and he passed command to Askarov to get treatment. The force then destroyed about thirty Syrian tanks.

The Israeli 7th Brigade was left with seven tanks, and Ben-Gal told Eitan he could no longer hold on. Suddenly A3, surrounded by Syrian forces, reported that the Syrian supply trains were turning around and withdrawing. Dennie Agmon, Eitan's intelligence officer, told him that the Syrian General Staff had decided to retreat. The Syrian forces, having lost over 500 tanks and APCs, began to withdraw.

== Aftermath ==
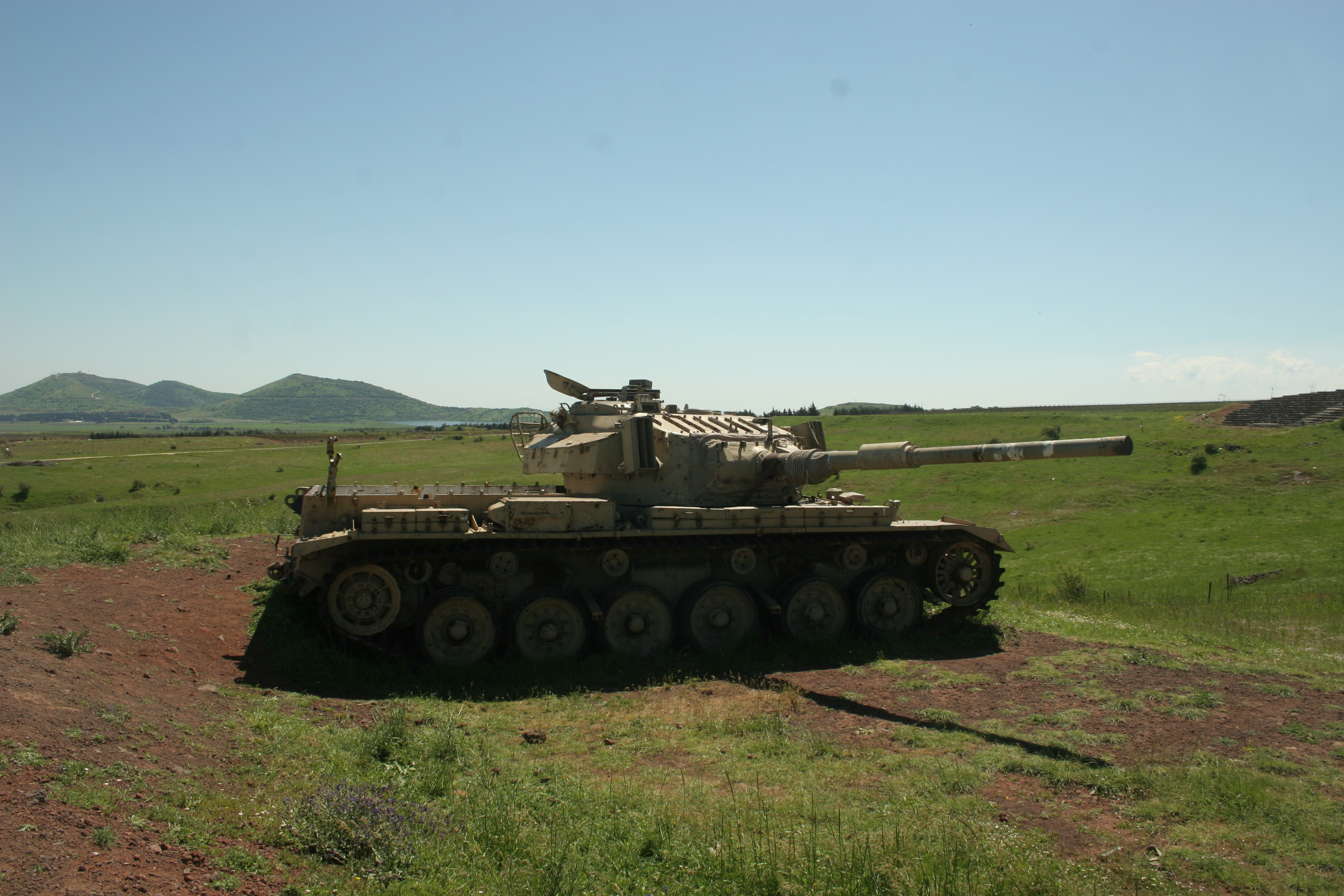
An abandoned tank in a memorial near the Valley of Tears, Golan Heights

The Israeli 7th Brigade, including reinforcements, totalled some twenty tanks. It began to pursue the Syrians but stopped at the anti-tank ditch. About 260 tanks were lying in the valley. The Syrians lost over 500 tanks and APCs and the Israelis lost 60 to 80 armored vehicles. One brigade from the 7th Division was taken out of action for three days and then reorganized as a battalion. Eitan told the 7th Brigade over the radio: "You have saved the people of Israel". Ben-Gal told Kahalani: "You are the true saviour of the people of Israel". In the afternoon, the brigade's tanks pulled back a few at a time for ammunition and fuel. Ben-Gal told Kahalani that the brigade had been ordered to counterattack in Syria. Eitan asked him to attack the next day, so as not to allow the Syrians time to reorganize, but Ben Gal asked for a day to allow his men to rest and refill the ranks. Kahalani was later awarded the Medal of Valor for his performance in the battle.

=== Analysis ===
Decades after the battle, analysts were still presenting differing reasons for the Syrian withdrawal. In 1990, Patrick Seale argued that the reason why the Syrians were stopped was the superiority of the IAF, which was free to devote all of its attention to the Syrian front. In 2002, Kenneth Pollack wrote that the Syrian forces did not look for an alternative axis of advance and rolled forward without defending their flanks. In 1998, Martin Van Creveld suggested the explanation that on October 8 (though the Syrians did not withdraw until more losses on October 9), when Israel felt that the battle was being lost, it threatened Syria with a nuclear strike. However, a historical review by Avner Cohen and others found no evidence of a nuclear threat by Israel.
