= Israeli occupation of the Golan Heights =

International legal status of the plateau near the Israel–Syria border

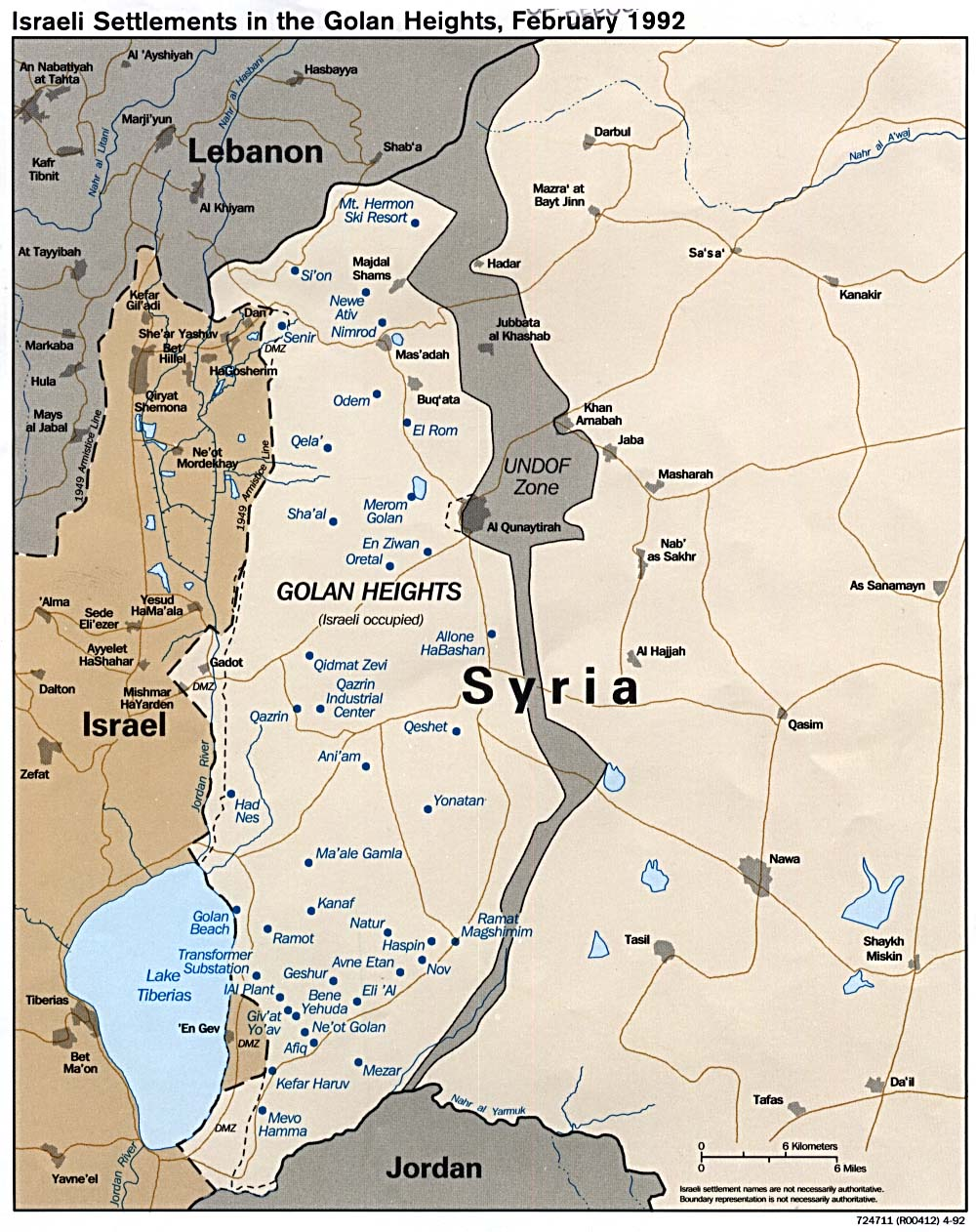
Map of Golan Heights occupied and colonized by Israel, 1992

The Golan Heights is a rocky plateau in southwestern Syria, in the Levant region of West Asia, that has been occupied by Israel since it was captured during the 1967 Six-Day War. The international community, with the exception of the United States and Colombia, considers the Golan Heights to be Syrian territory held by Israel under military occupation. Following the war, Syria dismissed any negotiations with Israel as part of the Khartoum Resolution.

The Golan was under military administration until the Knesset passed the Golan Heights Law in 1981, which applied Israeli law to the territory; a move that has been described as an annexation. In response, the United Nations Security Council unanimously passed UNSC Resolution 497 which condemned the Israeli actions to change the status of the territory declaring them "null and void and without international legal effect", and that the Golan remained an occupied territory. In 2019, the United States became the first state to recognize the Golan Heights as Israeli sovereign territory. In 2026, Colombia became the second to do so. The rest of the international community continues to consider the territory Syrian held under Israeli military occupation. Israeli officials had pushed for United States recognition of Israeli sovereignty over the territory. On 8 December 2024, following the fall of the Assad regime in Syria, Israeli forces seized Syrian positions in the UNDOF buffer zone expanding its occupied territory.

== Background ==
=== British and French Mandates ===
Historical borders and boundaries of the Golan Heights.

Following World War I, portions of the former territory of the Ottoman Empire were divided into several League of Nations mandates administered by the victorious Allied countries. The British Mandate for Palestine and the French Mandate for Syria were two such mandates, with the border finalized between them in the Paulet–Newcombe Agreement. The border, drawn in 1923, was the first and only international border between Syria and Palestine and to date, with the remaining boundaries result from armistice agreements. The boundary placed the entirety of the Sea of Galilee, along with a ten meter wide strip on the eastern shore, within the British Mandate. The French Mandate ended in 1946 with the independence of the Syrian Republic, which demanded changes to the border to allow for greater access to fresh water sources, demands the British refused on the basis that the border had been submitted and approved to the League of Nations and Britain thus considered the matter closed.

=== Post-mandate period ===
The 1948 Arab–Israeli War, which followed Israel's declaration of independence, resulted in the newly formed state of Israel in control over roughly 77% of what had been the territory of Mandatory Palestine. Syria had however advanced to the eastern shoreline of the Sea of Galilee, where the border as delineated by the British and the French was ten meters east of the shoreline. In the armistice negotiations that followed the declaration of a ceasefire, that ten meter strip was included in a demilitarized zone as Israel had argued for.

== Six-Day War and aftermath ==
In the 1967 Six-Day War, Israel captured and occupied a majority of the Golan Heights from Syria. Following the war, the United Nations Security Council passed Resolution 242, which called on Israel to withdraw from territories occupied in the war in exchange for the termination of all states of belligerency and recognition of Israel as a sovereign state by the Arab states. The 1973 Arab–Israeli War saw further territorial gains by Israel, though Israel agreed to return to the 1967 ceasefire line in the 1974 disengagement agreement between Israel and Syria. Syria has continued to insist on the return of the Golan in any negotiated peace agreement between the two countries.

=== UNDOF ===
The UNDOF zone is about 80 km long, and between 0.5 and 10 km wide, forming an area of 235 km^{2}. The zone straddles the Purple Line, separating the Israeli-occupied portion of the Golan Heights and the rest of Syria, where the west line is known as "Alpha", and the east line as "Bravo". The zone also borders the Lebanon Blue Line to the north and forms a border of less than 1 km with Jordan to the south.

Operationally, the Alpha Line was drawn in the west, not to be crossed by Israeli Forces, and the Bravo Line in the east, not to be crossed by Syrian Forces. Between these lines lies the Area of Separation (AOS) which is a buffer zone. Extending 25 km to either side is the Area of Limitation (AOL) where UNDOF, and Observer Group Golan (OGG) observers under its command, supervise the number of Syrian and Israeli troops and weapons. Inside the AOS, UNDOF operates with checkpoints and patrols. Previously two line-battalions operated in this area; one, in the northern part (previously AUSBATT) from the Mount Hermon massif to the region of Quneitra, and another (previously POLBATT) in the south down to the Jordanian border. As of 2020, Nepalese troops, including a mechanized company have taken over northern and central sectors.

On 8 December 2024, following the fall of the Bashar al-Assad government, Israeli forces seized Syrian positions in the AOS as a "temporary defensive position until a suitable arrangement is found", according to Israeli prime minister Benjamin Netanyahu.

== Settlements ==
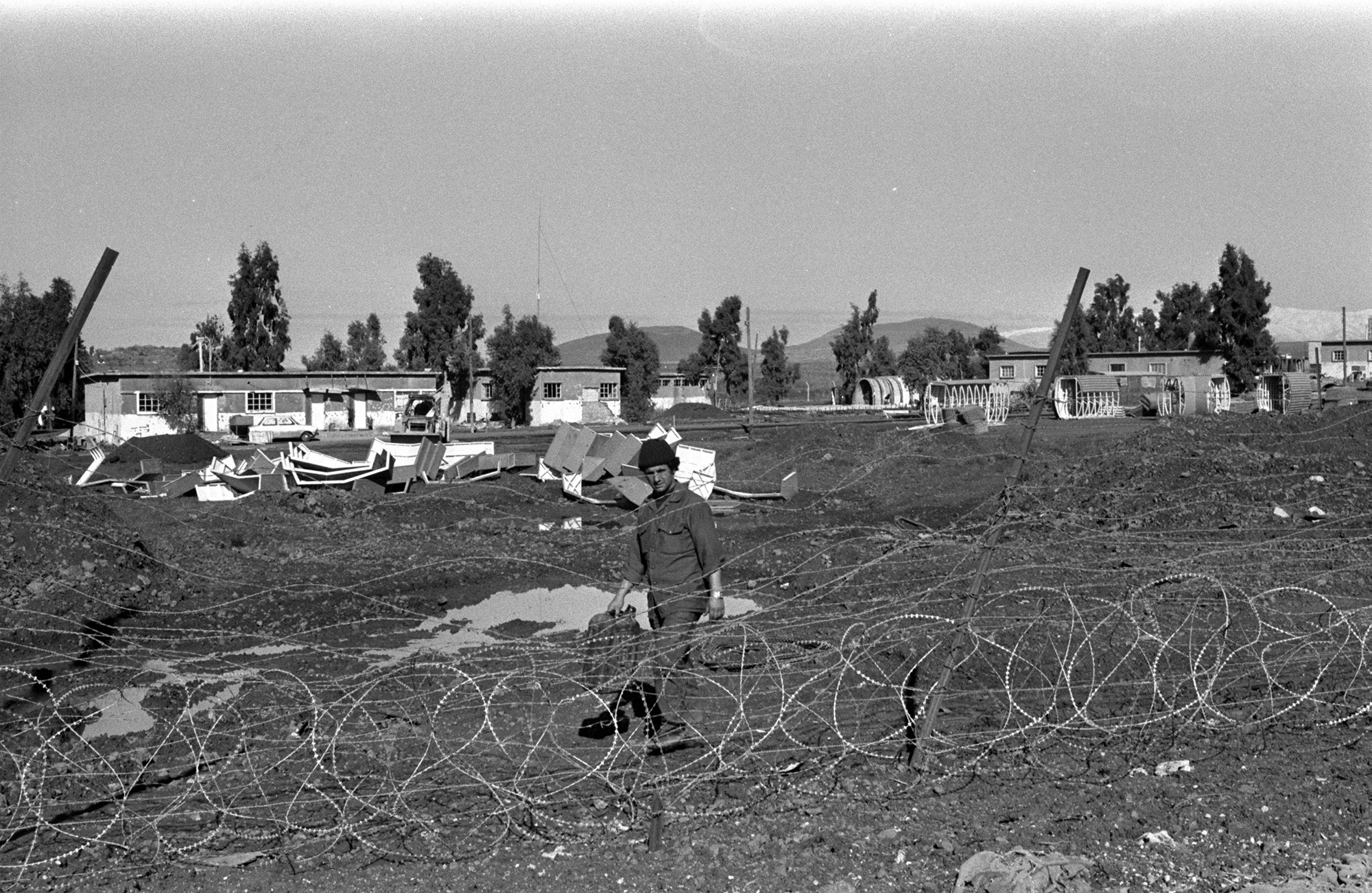
Construction of Keshet Israeli settlement, in 1975

As of 2019, the population of Israeli settlements in the Golan Heights was over 25,000.

In August 2026, the Dutch government banned products from Israeli settlements in the Golan Heights.

== Golan Heights Law ==
On 14 December 1981 the Israeli Knesset passed the Golan Heights Law. While the law did not use the term annexation, it was considered to be an annexation by the Israeli opposition and international community.

The action was condemned internationally, and in response the United Nations Security Council passed United Nations Security Council Resolution 497 declaring the law "null and void and without international legal effect" and that the Fourth Geneva Convention continued to apply to the Golan as an occupied territory.

== International views ==
The international community, with the exception of Israel and the United States, regards the Golan to be Syrian territory held under Israeli occupation. A number of states recognize the Israeli occupation as being legitimate under the United Nations Charter on a self-defense basis, but do not consider those concerns to allow for the annexation of territory seized by force.

In March 2019, the United States, which previously considered the Golan Heights to be occupied, became the first country to recognize Israeli sovereignty over the territory it has held since 1967. The US recognition was lobbied by Israeli officials. The rest of the international community continues to view the territory as Syrian, held under Israeli occupation. The European members of the United Nations Security Council issued a joint statement condemning the US announcement and the UN Secretary-General António Guterres issued a statement saying that the status of the Golan Heights had not changed. The Arab League denounced the US move, declaring that President Donald Trump's recognition does not change the area's status.

On 10 August 2026, Colombia became the second country to recognize Israeli sovereignty over the Golan Heights, after a meeting between the Israeli foreign minister and Colombia's new government. The Israeli foreign minister also stated that he will continue to work for other countries to recognize "Israeli sovereignty" over the territory. The outgoing Colombian president Gustavo Petro denounced the new government's declaration and alleged that Israel assisted in committing voter fraud to help bring Abelardo de la Espriella to power. While Petro pointed to alleged server IP changes and modified voting tally sheets, news outlets noted he provided no evidence linking Israel to any alleged manipulation, and Colombian authorities stated there was no evidence of fraud.

Colombia's recognition was condemned by Syria, Saudi Arabia, Egypt, Jordan, Qatar, Kuwait and Iraq. The Secretary-General of the Gulf Cooperation Council issued a statement condemning Colombia's recognition and stated that it violates international law. The United Nations Deputy Special Envoy for Syria Claudio Cordone stated that: "As most recently reaffirmed by Secretary-General António Guterres in Damascus, the Golan Heights are occupied Syrian territory. Colombia's acceptance of Israel's annexation of this territory directly contravenes international law."

== See also ==
- Borders of Israel
- Israeli-occupied territories
- Israel–Syria relations
- Syrian civil war#Foreign involvement
