= Sha'al =

Israeli settlement in the Golan Heights

Sha'al: שַׁעַל (Hebrew)
- Location within the Golan Heights Location within the Golan Heights
- Coordinates: 33°7′0″N 35°43′6″E
- Country: Golan Heights (Internationally recognized as Syrian territory occupied by Israel.)
- District: Northern
- Subdistrict: Golan
- Council: Golan
- Region: Golan Heights
- Affiliation: Mishkei Herut Beitar
- Founded: 1980
- Population (2024): 451

Sha'al (Hebrew: שַׁעַל) is an Israeli settlement and moshav in the northern Golan Heights, which Israel considers part of its sovereign territory. In 2024 it had a population of 451.

The international community considers Israeli settlements in the Golan Heights illegal under international law, but the Israeli government disputes this.

== History ==
The gar'in that established Sha'al was formed in 1976 in protest at a UN resolution condemning Israel. They were initially based in an army base in Quneitra before moving to the site of Sha'al in 1980 at a time when the Golan Heights was a part of the Israeli Military Governorate. The name of the moshav is a Hebrew acronym of: ("שב עם לאדמתו") "Shav Am LeAdmato." ("Returned the people to its land."). In 1981, the area of Golan was unilaterally annexed by Israel, abolishing the military occupation system and establishing Israeli civil rule on the area.

== Transportation ==
The Golan Regional Council operates two buses per day from Sha'al to the Israeli city of Kiryat Shmona. The bus line begins at Katzrin and also stops at Kela Alon. The bus ride to Kiryat Shmona takes approximately 29 minutes. Sha'al is located close to Highway 978, a regional road running through the Golan Heights.

== See also ==
- Israeli-occupied territories
