= Route 978 (Golan Heights) =

Route in Israel

Route 978
- כביש 978

Route information
- Length: 21 km (13 mi)

Major junctions
- South end: HaShiryon Junction
- North end: Odem Forest Junction

Location
- Country: Israel

Highway system
- Roads in Israel; Highways
← Route 977	→ Route 989

Route 978 is a regional north-south Israeli highway in the Golan Heights.

Route 978 is maintained by the National Roads Company of Israel.

== Junctions (South to North) ==
District	Location	km	mi	Name	Destinations	Notes
Northern	Ruins of Kafr Naffakh	0	0.0	צומת השריון (HaShiryon Junction)	Highway 91	
Northern	Sha'al	6.5	4.0	צומת שעל (Sha'al Junction)	Road 9781	
Northern	Orvim Park	9	5.6	צומת האמיר (HaAmir Junction)	Route 959	
Northern	El Rom	14.5	9.0	צומת גוב געש (Gov Ga'ash Junction)	Road 9799	
Northern	Odem	18	11	צומת אודם (Odem Junction)	Road 9798	
Northern	Mas'ade	21	13	צומת יער אודם (Odem Forest Junction)	Highway 98	
1.000 mi = 1.609 km; 1.000 km = 0.621 mi

== See also ==
- List of highways in Israel
