= Route 959 (Golan Heights) =

Route in Israel

Route 959
- כביש 959

Route information
- Length: 17.5 km (10.9 mi)

Major junctions
- West end: Gonen Junction
- East end: Bar'on Junction

Location
- Country: Israel

Highway system
- Roads in Israel; Highways
← Route 918	→ Route 977

Route 959 is a regional east-west highway in the Golan Heights. It proceeds from Gonen junction in the west until Bar'on Junction (pronounced "bar-OWN") in the east.

Route 959 is maintained by the National Roads Company of Israel.

== Junctions (West to East) ==
District	Location	km	mi	Name	Destinations	Notes
Northern	Gonen	0	0.0	צומת גונן (Gonen Junction)	Route 918	
Northern	Kela Alon	6.8	4.2	מסעף קלע אלון מערב (West Kela Alon Branch)	Road 9784	
Northern	Kela Alon	7	4.3	צומת רוויה (Revaya Junction)	Petroleum Road	
Northern	Kela Alon	8.5	5.3	מסעף קלע אלון מזרח (East Kela Alon Branch)	Road 9782	
Northern	Orvim Park	11.5	7.1	צומת האמיר (HaAmir Junction)	Route 978	
Northern	Merom Golan	13.5	8.4	צומת פורן (Poren Junction)	Road 9881	
Northern	Merom Golan	15	9.3	צומת בנטל (Bental Junction)	Road 9882	
Northern	Merom Golan	17.5	10.9	צומת בראון (Bar'on Junction)	Highway 98	
1.000 mi = 1.609 km; 1.000 km = 0.621 mi

== See also ==
- List of highways in Israel
