= Route 918 (Golan Heights) =

Route in Israel

Route 918
- כביש 918
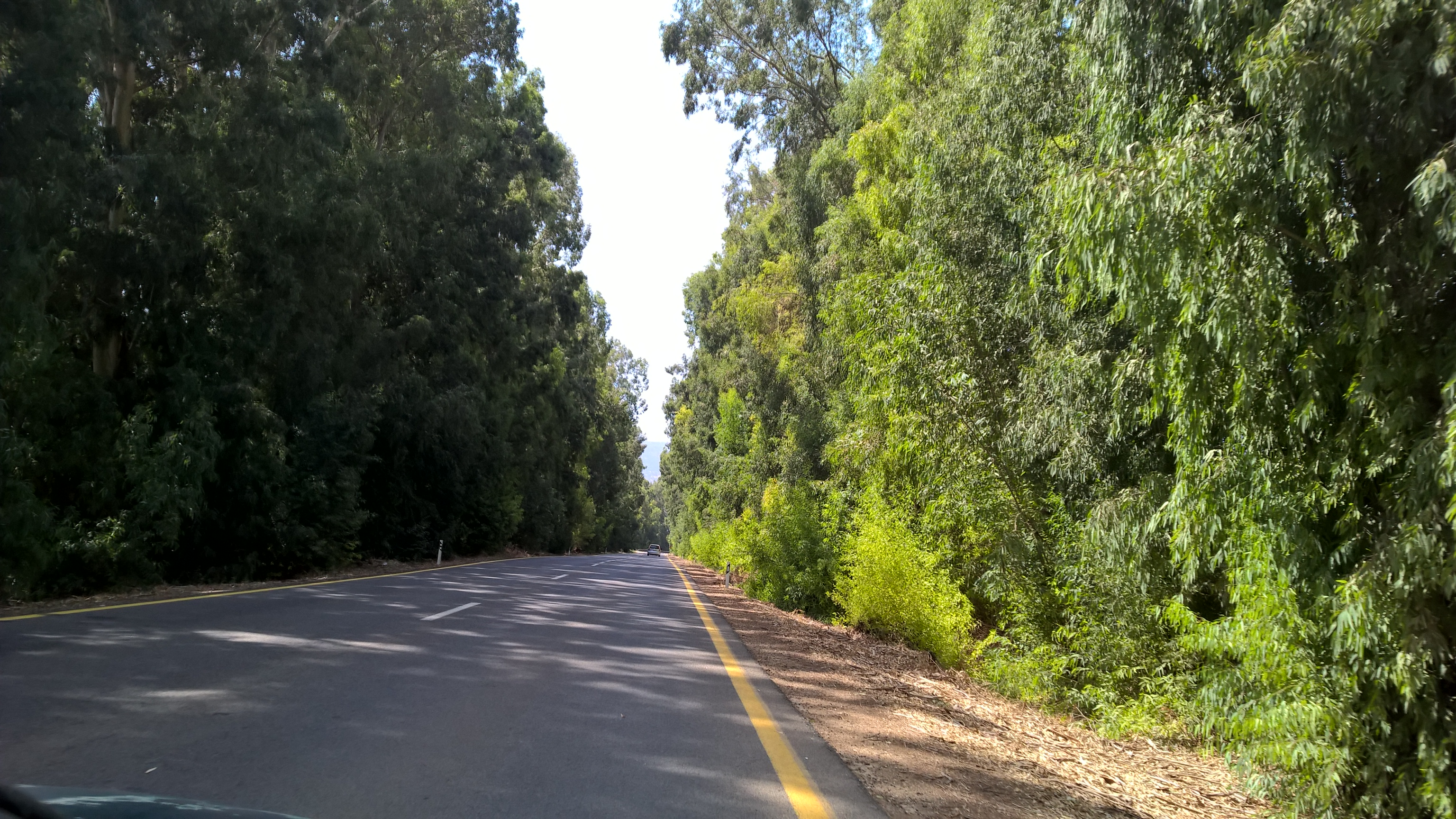

Route information
- Length: 27 km (17 mi)

Major junctions
- South end: Gadot Junction
- North end: Hurshat Tal Junction

Location
- Country: Israel

Highway system
- Roads in Israel; Highways
← Route 899	→ Route 959

Route 918 is a north-south regional highway in the Israeli-occupied portion of the Golan Heights.

Route 918 is maintained by the National Roads Company of Israel.

== Junctions (South to North) ==
District	Location	km	mi	Name	Destinations	Notes
Northern	Gadot	0	0.0	צומת גדות (Gadot Junction)	Highway 91	
Northern	Gonen	13	8.1	צומת גונן (Gonen Junction)	Route 959	
Northern	Lehavot HaBashan	16	9.9	צומת להבות הבשן (Lehavot HaBashan Junction)	Route 977	
Northern	Shamir	18	11	צומת שמיר (Shamir Junction)	Road 9892	
Northern	Tel Anafa	20	12	צומת תל אנפה (Tel Anafa Junction)	Road 9779	
Northern	Kfar Szold	23	14	צומת כפר סאלד (Kfar Szold Junction)	Road 9891	
Northern	She'ar Yashuv	26	16	צומת שאר יישוב (She'ar Yashuv Junction)	Palgei Mayim Street	
Northern	Hurshat Tal	27	17	צומת חורשת טל (Hurshat Tal Junction)	Highway 99	
1.000 mi = 1.609 km; 1.000 km = 0.621 mi

== See also ==
- List of highways in Israel
