= Route 977 (Golan Heights) =

Route in Israel

Route 977
- כביש 977
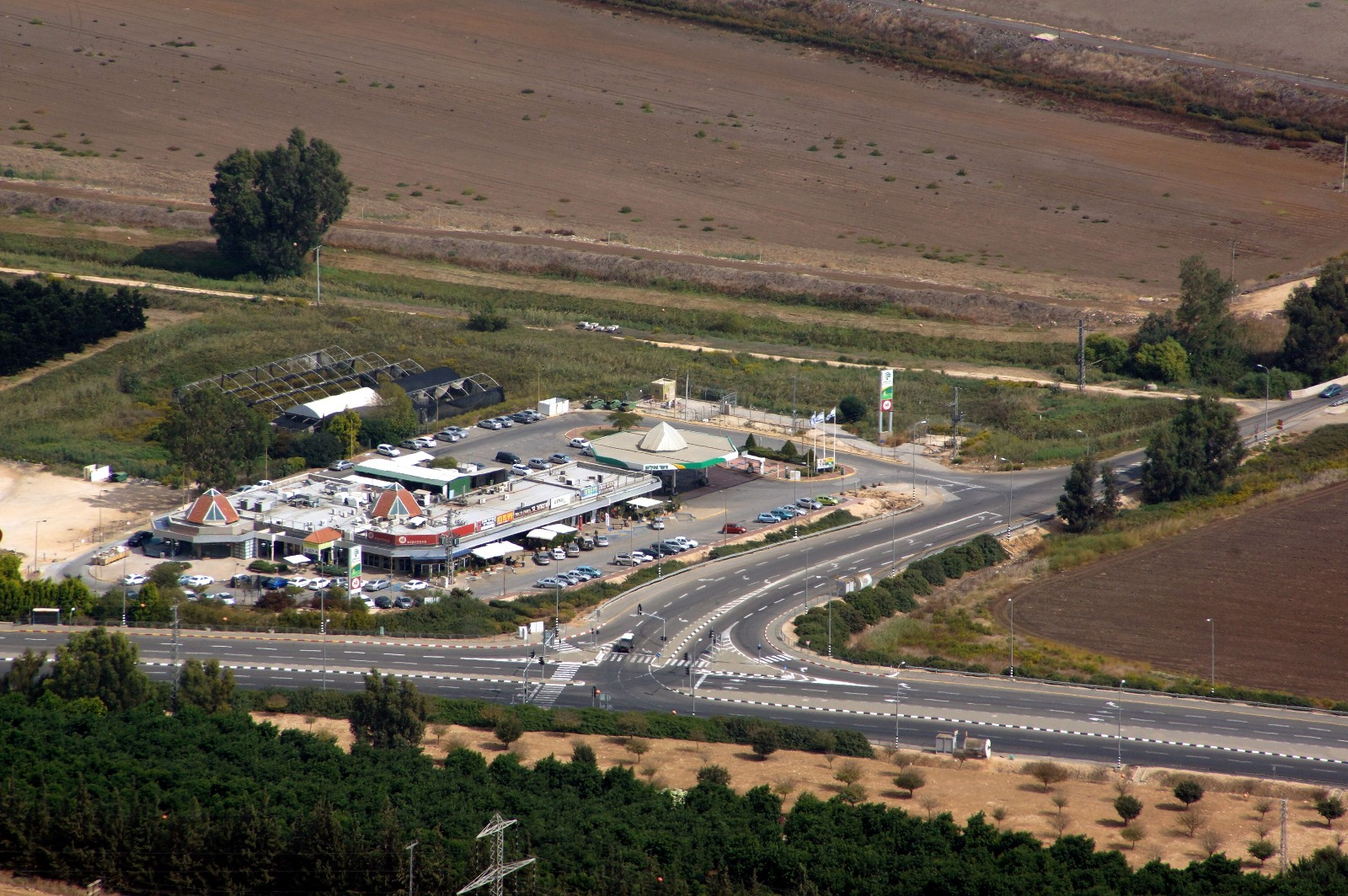
- Goma Junction at the start of Route 977

Route information
- Length: 7 km (4.3 mi)

Major junctions
- West end: Gome Junction
- East end: Lehavot HaBashan Junction

Location
- Country: Israel

Highway system
- Roads in Israel; Highways
← Route 959	→ Route 978

Route 977 is an east-west regional highway in the Israeli-occupied portion of the Golan Heights, stretching from the Goma junction to the Lehavot HaBashan junction.

Route 977 is maintained by the National Roads Company of Israel.

== Junctions (West to East) ==
District	Location	km	mi	Name	Destinations	Notes
Northern	Ein Bedolah Nature Reserve	0	0.0	צומת גומא (Gome Junction)	Highway 90	
Northern	Kfar Blum	2.5	1.6	מסעף כפר בלום דרום (South Kfar Blum Branch)	Road 9778	
Northern	Neot Mordechai	3.5	2.2	מסעף נאות מרדכי (Neot Mordechai Branch)	Entrance road	
Northern	Lehavot HaBashan	7	4.3	צומת להבות הבשן (Lehavot HaBashan Junction)	Route 918	
1.000 mi = 1.609 km; 1.000 km = 0.621 mi
