= Kafr Naffakh =

Abandoned Syrian village in the Golan Heights

Kafr Naffakh ﻛﻔﺮ ﻧﻔﺎخ כפר נפח
- Village
- Location within the Golan Heights
- Coordinates: 33°3′44″N 35°44′27″E
- Grid position: 219/274 PAL
- Country: Syria
- Governorate: Quneitra
- District: Quneitra
- Region: Golan Heights
- Destroyed: June 10, 1967

Population (1960)
  - Total: 664

Kafr Naffakh (Arabic: ﻛﻔﺮ ﻧﻔﺎخ) is an abandoned Syrian village in the central Golan Heights, Quneitra Governorate.

== History ==
Sites and artifacts were found in the village that show human settlement as early as the Roman and Hellenistic eras, during which the village sat next to a central route that connected Syrian cities to the Mediterranean coast. During the Roman era, the village was used as a station for providing services to passengers on the main road. Such a station – "Mutatio" – was placed approximately every six kilometres along the main roads throughout the Roman Empire. In 2020, an archaeological dig discovered a 1,700-year-old boundary stone on which "Kfar Naffakh" was written in Greek letters. This indicates that the village's name during the Byzantine era was "Naffakh". A more modern reading od the name as Kafarnafaae (Καφαρναφααε) on the Diocletianic boundary stones corpus, was published in 2026.

Transhumance shaped settlement in the Golan for centuries because of its harsh winters. The winters "forced tribespeople until the 19th century to live in hundreds of rudimentary 'winter villages' in their tribal territory. Starting in the second part of the 19th century, villages like Kafr Naffakh became "fixed and formed the nucleus of fully sedentary life in the 20th century Golan."

During the 19th century, the village was repopulated by Turkmen settlers, who used the ruins of the place to build their houses. Over the years, the village was also inhabited by residents of other origins and by 1960, it had a total of 664 residents. In 1967, with the advance of the IDF in the Golan Heights, the village's residents left their homes and it was abandoned.

During the Syrian rule in the Golan Heights, the village sat on the central route from Quneitra - Daughters of Jacob Bridge, being more or less in the centre of the road. There were centres and bases of the Syrian army in the vicinity of the village, including in Naffakh and Alika. After Israel conquered the Golan Heights in June 1967, the abandoned village served as a temporary settlement nucleus in the Golan Heights. Today, there are several IDF bases in the vicinity of the abandoned village, including Camp Yitzhak (Camp Naffakh).

The ruins of the village are located near the HaShiryon Junction connecting Highway 91 and Route 978, and slightly west of Naffakh is also the junction connecting the Petroleum Road and Highway 91.

== Sources ==
- Dauphin, Claudine; Gibson, Shimon (September 1994). "יישובים עתיקים וסביבתם בלב הגולן – תוצאותיהן של עשר שנות סקר (1988-1978)" (PDF). Cathedra. 73.
