= Trump Heights =

Israeli settlement in the Golan Heights

Trump Heights: רמת טראמפ (Hebrew)
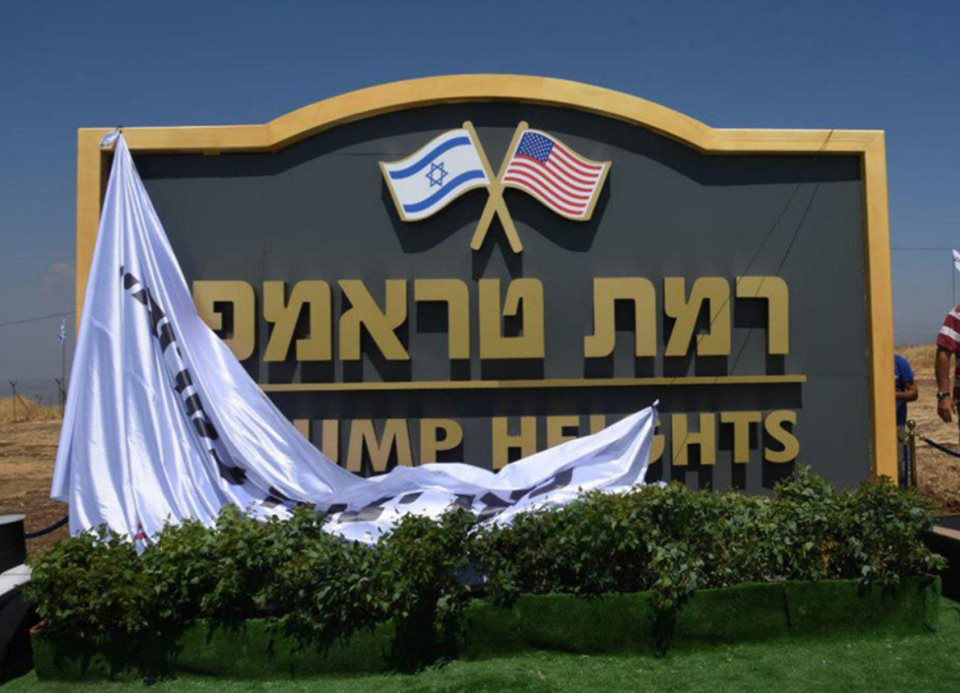
- The sign at the entrance to the settlement

- Location within the Golan Heights Location within the Golan Heights
- Coordinates: 33°7′57″N 35°41′26″E
- Country: Golan Heights (Internationally recognized as Syrian territory occupied by Israel.)
- District: Northern
- Subdistrict: Golan
- Council: Golan
- Region: Golan Heights
- Founded: 2019
- Population (2024): 111

Trump Heights (Hebrew: רמת טראמפ, romanized: Ramat Trump [ʁaˈmat ˈtʁamp]) is an Israeli settlement in the Israeli-occupied Golan Heights named after and in honor of Donald Trump, the 45th and 47th President of the United States.

Israeli settlements in the Golan Heights are widely regarded as illegal under international law; however, the Israeli government disputes this.

It is under the jurisdiction of Golan Regional Council. It is the first community in Israel and Israeli-occupied territories named after a sitting American president since Kfar Truman.

In 2024 it had a population of 111.

== Location ==
The settlement is located near the community of Kela Alon, where the Beruchim community, which was founded in 1991, was located. The area of the settlement of Beruchim was planned for future expansion of the settlement of Kela Alon, and is inhabited by a few residents.

The settlement is very close to the Petroleum Road. This route separates Beruchim / Ramat Trump from East, and Kela Alon to the west of it.

== History ==
A kibbutz was established in the area in the 1980s. However, it disassembled after a few years. In 1991, an Israeli settlement called Brukhim was established on the land of the future Trump Heights. It failed to attract many residents. Brukhim had ten residents as of 2019.

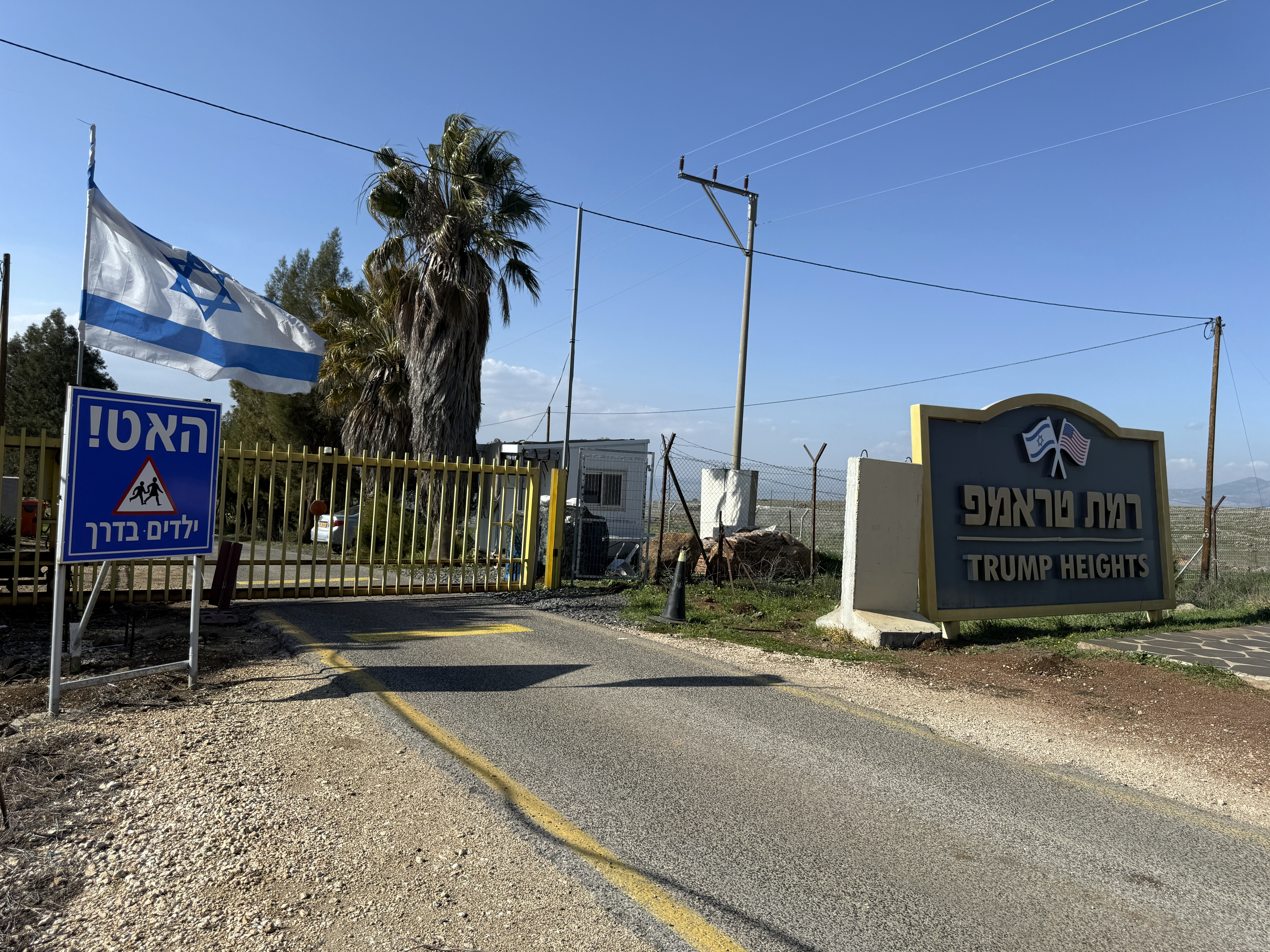
Entrance to the settlement, 18 February 2025

The government of Israel convened on June 16, 2019, at the planned location in the depopulated settlement of Brukhim, very close to Kela Alon in the north-west of the Golan Heights, and declared the establishment of the new settlement as gratitude to Donald Trump for support for Israel and recognition of Israeli sovereignty over the Golan Heights.

The settlement did not yet have any funding at the time of its announced establishment. Due to this, it was met with criticism by then-opposition leaders in Israel. Zvi Hauser called it a "dummy-resolution". In Axios, it was referred to as a "public relations stunt". Gideon Remez later referred to the settlement as a Potemkin village. However, the Ministry of Construction entered the preliminary planning stage at this time.

In the first stage, 110 housing units were planned, with the regional council planning as many as 400 homes in the area in the long term. The population of the community was planned to consist of both religious and secular settlers. On August 6, 2019, the National Planning and Building Council approved the establishment of the new settlement. A pre-military mechina boarding school was inaugurated in the settlement on November 7, 2019, and it was reportedly attended by a community of teenagers by October 2020. As of June 2020, construction of housing had not begun. At that time, all but two letters of the entrance sign had been removed by either vandals or rough weather. However, the sign was restored by January 2021.

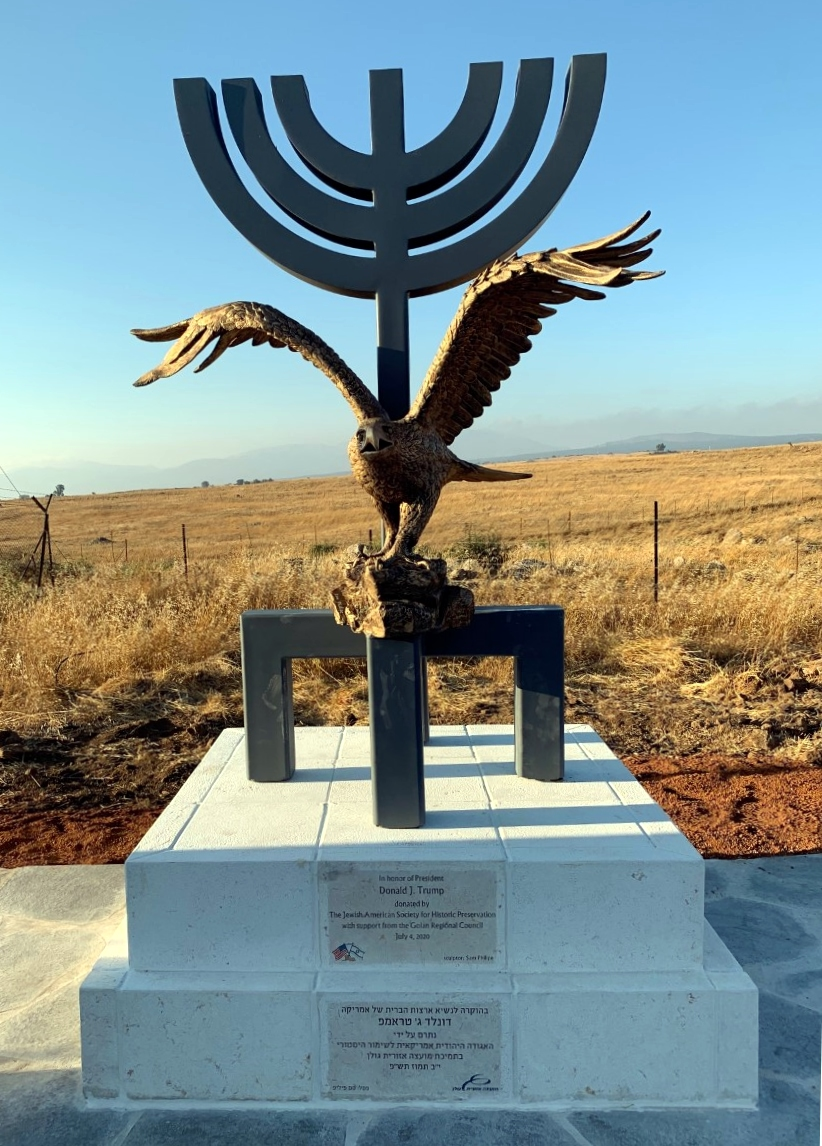
The Golan Eagle honoring President Trump – Trump Heights, Golan

In June 2020, Israel's government approved 8 million Israeli new shekels (about 2.3 million in US dollars) in funding for the Trump Heights settlement. On July 4, 2020, a major sculptural memorial was placed adjacent to the entrance to Trump Heights, honoring President Donald J. Trump. It depicts an eagle in front of a menorah. Settlers began arriving in April 2021, with as many as twenty families having been expected to arrive that summer.

As of December 2024, Trump Heights was home to about 70 adults and 60 children under 13, comprising 26 families, living in "makeshift homes and caravans". Community leader Yarden Freimann said the community planned to double its population in the next year, consistent with an Israeli government plan to double the Jewish population in the Golan Heights. Land had been cleared in preparation for around 50 new homes.

== Economy ==
The main economic sectors of the region are agriculture and tourism. The immediate area reportedly experienced an increase in tourism after the Trump Heights settlement was announced.

== Geography ==
The settlement area for Trump Heights consists of about 276 dunams (about 68 acres). It is about 670 meters (~2,200 feet) above sea level. The surrounding area has been described as a "largely treeless" volcanic plateau, with tall grass and stray land mines.

The settlement is about 45 minutes from a hospital in Safed, and 30 minutes from a market in Kiryat Shmona. It is about 64.4 kilometers (40.0 mi) southwest of Damascus, Syria, and 12 kilometers (7.5 miles) from the armistice line with Syria.

== See also ==
- List of things named after Donald Trump
