= Tapline Road =

Tapline Road can mean either of the following:

- Trans-Arabian_Pipeline#Tapline_Road - the section that runs through Saudi Arabia
- Petroleum Road - The section of the road that goes through the Golan
