= Highway 91 (Golan Heights and Israel) =

Highway in Israel

Coordinates: 33°01′32″N 35°40′25″E

Highway 91
- כביש 91
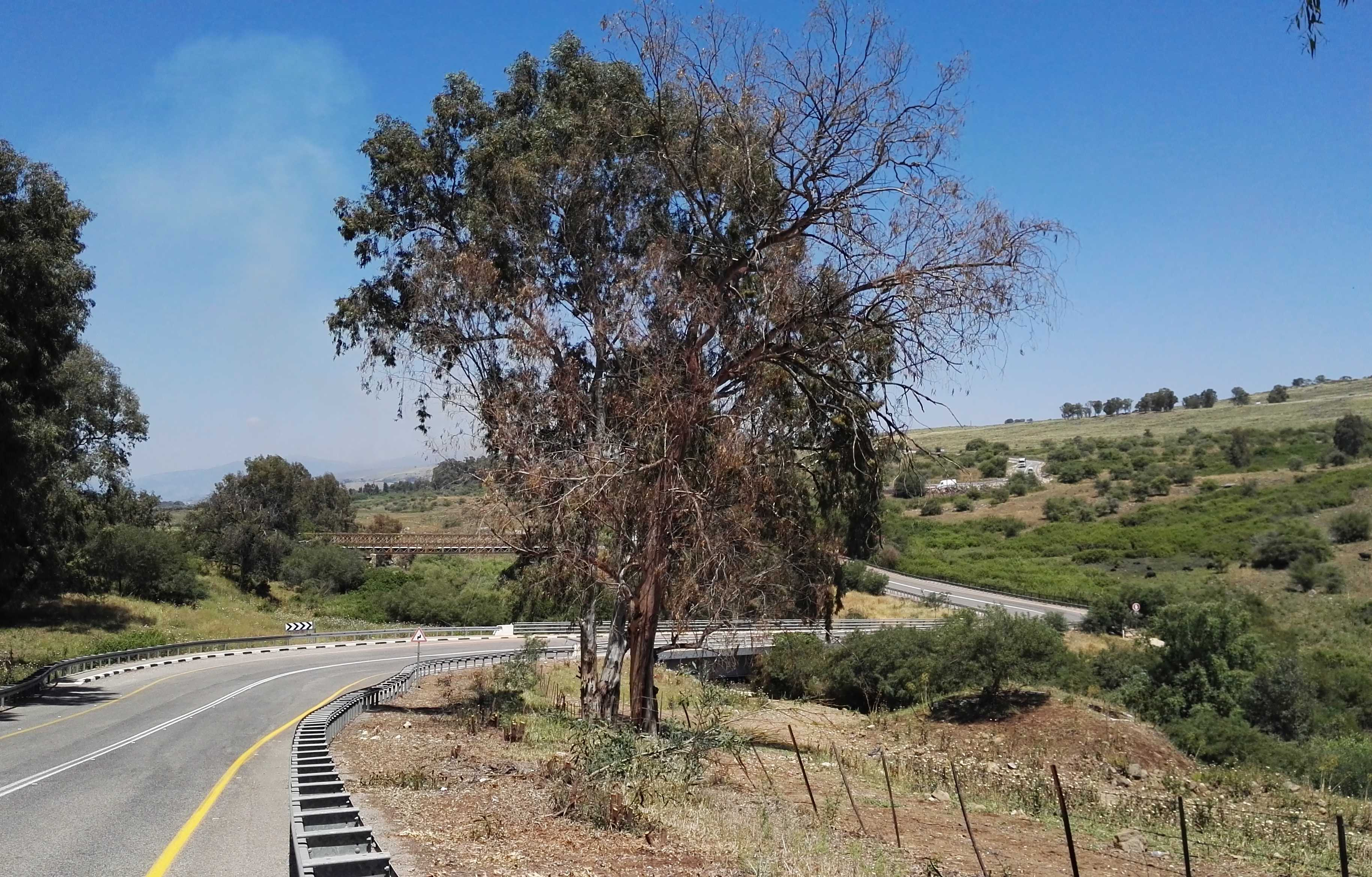
- Bnot Yaakov bridge over the Jordan River

Route information
- Length: 29.71 km (18.46 mi)

Major junctions
- West end: Mahanayim Junction
- East end: Zivan Junction

Location
- Country: Israel

Highway system
- Roads in Israel; Highways
← Highway 90	→ Highway 92

Highway 91 is an east-west highway in northern Israel and the Golan Heights. It extends through the Jordan Rift Valley and the central Golan Heights. It begins in the west at Mahanayim junction with Highway 90, and it ends in the east at Zivan junction near the Israeli settlement Ein Zivan, where it meets Highway 98. The road is 28 km long.

Route 91 is maintained by the National Roads Company of Israel.

== Junctions & Interchanges (West to East) ==
District	Location	km	mi	Name	Destinations	Notes
Northern	Mahanayim	0.00	0.00	צומת מחניים (Mahanayim Junction)	Highway 90	
Northern	Mishmar HaYarden	4.21	2.62	מסעף משמר הירדן (Mishmar HaYarden Branch)	HaMoshava Street	
Northern	Gadot	6.76	4.20	צומת גדות (Gadot Junction)	Route 918	
Northern	Customs office	12.01	7.46	צומת בית המכס (Customs House Junction)	Route 888	
Northern	Katzrin	14.69	9.13	צומת נשוט (Nashut Junction)	Road 9088	
Northern	Kidmat Tzvi	20.19	12.55	מחנה עוז (Oz Camp)	Road 9098	
Northern	Camp Yitzhak	21.64	13.45	צומת נפח (Naffakh Junction)	Petroleum Road	
Northern	Ruins of Kafr Naffakh	22.97	14.27	צומת השריון (HaShiryon Junction)	Route 978	
Northern	Ortal	26.37	16.39	מסעף אורטל (Ortal Branch)	Road 9884	
Northern	Mount Avital	27.98	17.39	צומת אביטל (Avital Junction)	Road 9881	
Northern	Ein Zivan	29.71	18.46	צומת זיוון (Zivan Junction)	Highway 98	
1.000 mi = 1.609 km; 1.000 km = 0.621 mi

== Places of interest near Highway 91 ==
- Memorial for Mishmar HaYarden
- Bnot Ya'akov Bridge
- Chief customs office (?)
- Memorial for the IDF 188th brigade

== See also ==
- List of highways in Israel
