= Mount Hermonit =

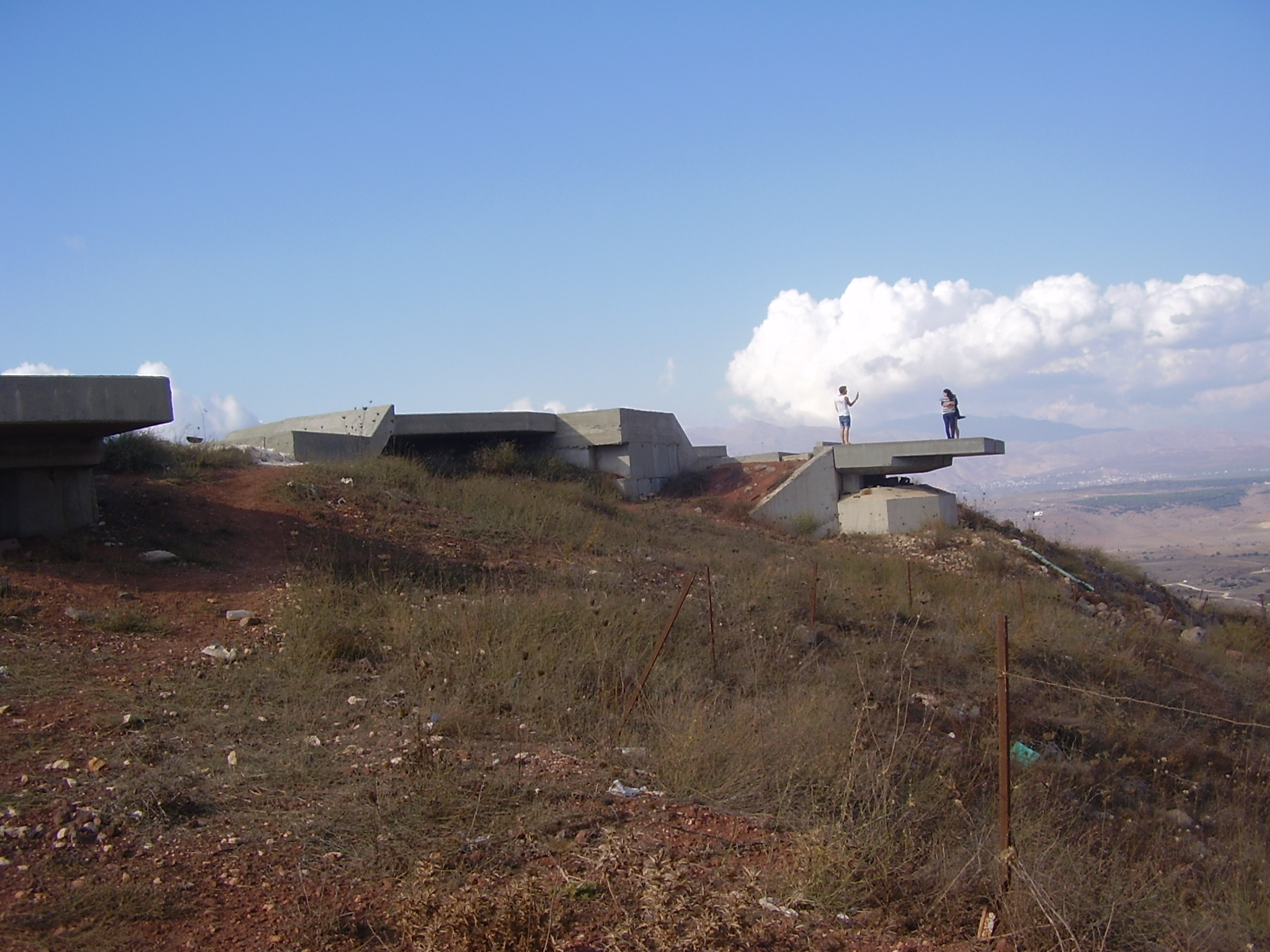
- Mount Hermonit in the Golan Heights

Highest point
- Elevation: 1,216 m (3,990 ft)
- Prominence: 132 m (433 ft)
- Listing: Mountains in the Golan Heights
- Coordinates: 33°11′07″N 35°47′39″E

Geography
- Location within the Golan Heights
- Region: Golan Heights

Mount Hermonit (Hebrew: הר חרמונית, Har Hermonit), also known as the little Hermon, is the second highest mountain in the Golan Heights and an inactive volcano. Located 1,216 m (3,990 ft) above the sea level. This mountain contains evidence of the Yom Kippur War, including the remains of bunkers. There are scenic views of the Mount Hermon, Valley of Tears and the Golan heights.

== History ==
Mount Hermonit was the major IDF fighting position during the 1973 Yom Kippur War. To the south of Mount Hermonit is the Valley of Tears, named after the 1973 Arab-Israeli war.

The valley was named Valley of Tears due to the terrible war and many tank kills here in 1973. The bulk of the Syrian invasion attempted to come through this valley. Here 44 Israeli tanks held off more than 1000 Syrian tanks from entering the Golan Heights. More than 350 destroyed tanks and APCs were left when they withdrew. While Israel lost 40 of the 44 tanks (one of which was captained by Yoni Netanyahu). The first generation of the Israeli Merkava Tank is still displayed here.
