= Camp Yitzhak =

IDF base in Golan Heights

Coordinates: 33°03′09″N 35°44′03″E

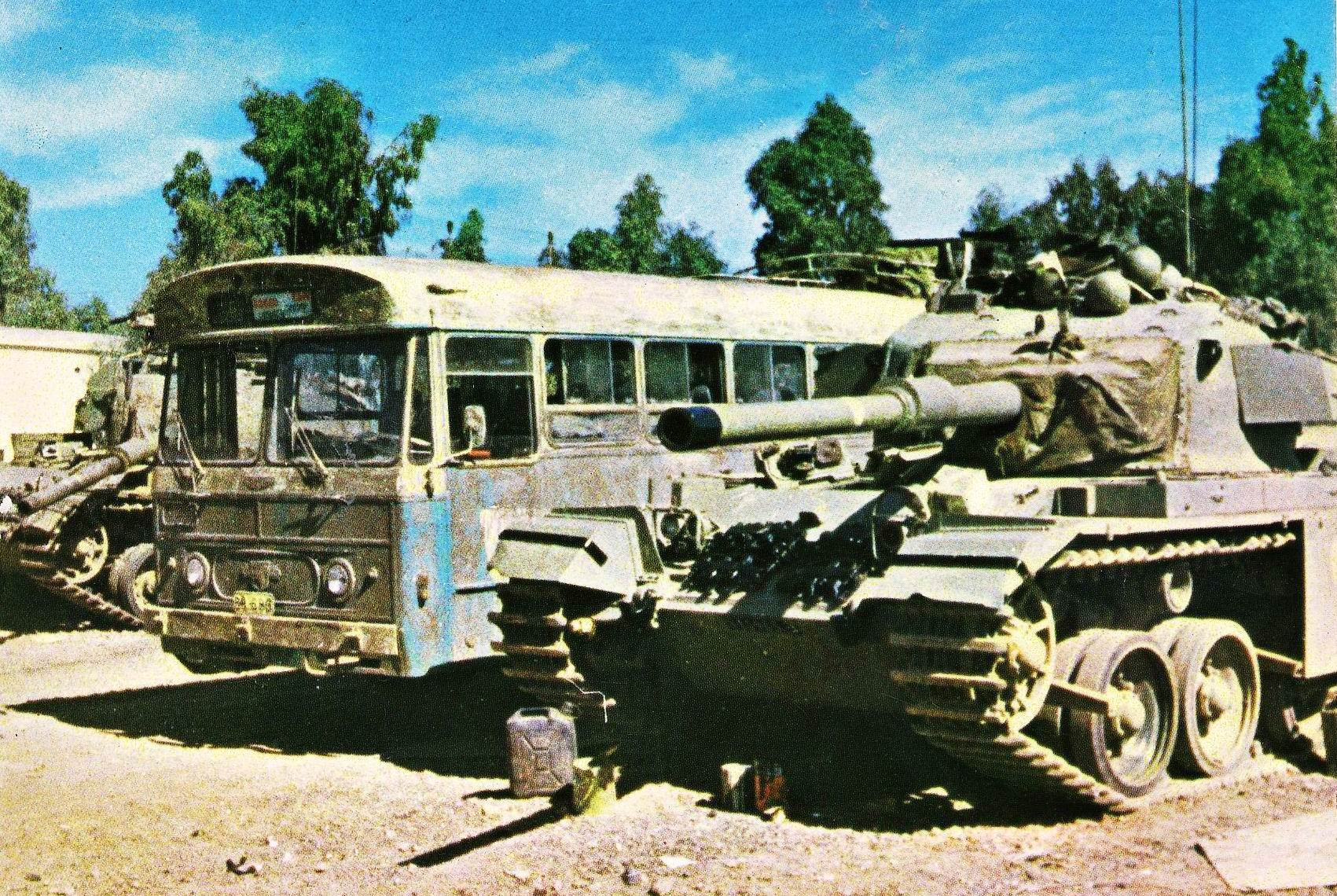
Egged bus between Israeli tanks in the Golan Heights, Yom Kippur War.

Camp Yitzhak (Hebrew: מחנה יצחק) is an IDF base in the center of the Golan Heights. The base, also known as Camp Naffakh (מחנה נפח), serves as the headquarters of the 210th Division, the IDF division stationed in the Golan Heights. Until January 2014, the camp served as the headquarters of the 36th Division.

== Camp ==
The camp is located about three kilometres southwest of Mount Shifon, near the ruins of Kafr Naffakh – a village whose inhabitants, Turkmen Muslims, abandoned it during the Six-Day War. The camp stands at the intersection of two main roads in the Golan Heights – Highway 91 (the road leading from Gesher Benot Ya'aqov to Quneitra) and the Petroleum Road.

After the Six-Day War, the camp was used by the Alexandroni Brigade, which was responsible for the Golan Heights area. It was named after Lt. Col. Yitzhak Halfon, a battalion commander in the brigade, who fell in the battle on the Golan Heights in the Six-Day War.

A few kilometres east of the base at the foot of Mount Shifon stands a monument to the fallen of the 679th Brigade.

== Battles at the Camp ==
On the first day of the Yom Kippur War, the headquarters of 36th Division (then under the command of Brigadier General Rafael Eitan) was found in the camp and the forward command group of the Northern Command was located there.

When the war broke out, Syrian planes attacked the camp. Due to its strategic location, the Syrian forces that broke into the plateau directed their main attack towards it. On the second day of the war, October 7, the camp was evacuated, after Syrian tanks approached it from the south. The tanks trampled the fences of the camp and fired into it, but were stopped and pushed away that day by IDF soldiers, including Efi Eitam who was awarded the Medal of Distinguished Service, who fired bazooka bombs at them from inside the camp and then by Israeli tanks that sensed the place.

On October 8 and 9, the Syrians carried out additional attacks in an attempt to capture the camp, but the IDF blocked the attacks in the area south of it. On October 9, a patrol force from the Sayeret Matkal, under the command of Yoni Netanyahu, which served as an elite patrol company in the 36th Division, was dispatched to Camp Naffakh following notification of the infiltration of helicopters landing Syrian commando fighters near the base. During the battle between a patrol of the General Staff and the Syrian commando, 40 Syrian fighters were killed. Netanyahu was awarded the Medal of Distinguished Service for how he commanded the battle and other actions he performed in the war.
