= United Nations Security Council Resolution 497 =

United Nations Security Council resolution negating Golan Heights Law

UN Security Council Resolution 497
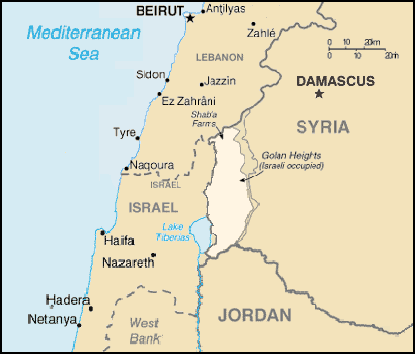
- Golan Heights
- Date: 17 December 1981
- Meeting no.: 2,319
- Code: S/RES/497 (Document)
- Subject: Israel–Syria
- Voting summary: 15 voted for; None voted against; None abstained
- Result: Adopted

Security Council composition
- Permanent members: China; France; Soviet Union; United Kingdom; United States
- Non-permanent members: East Germany; Ireland; Japan; Mexico; Niger; Panama; Philippines; Spain; Tunisia; Uganda

United Nations Security Council resolution 497, adopted unanimously on 17 December 1981, declared that the Israeli Golan Heights Law, which effectively annexed the Golan Heights, is "null and void and without international legal effect" and further calls on Israel to rescind its action.

The council requested the secretary-general to report to the council within two weeks on the implementation of the resolution, and in the event of non-compliance by Israel, the council would reconvene, not later than 5 January 1982, to discuss further action under the United Nations Charter.

Israel did not comply with the resolution. After lengthy discussions on 20 January 1982, the USA vetoed a Chapter VII resolution that called for action by the international community against Israel. Then on 5 February 1982, an emergency special session of the United Nations General Assembly adopted by 86 votes to 21 a resolution calling for a boycott of Israel (the US and many other Western states voted against).

== See also ==
- Arab–Israeli conflict
- Golan Heights
- Israel–Syria relations
- List of United Nations Security Council Resolutions 401 to 500 (1976–1982)
