= Golan Heights Law =

1981 de facto annexation of the Golan Heights by Israel

The Golan Heights Law (Hebrew: חוק רמת הגולן, romanized: Khok Ramat HaGolan) is the Israeli law which applies Israel's government and laws to the Golan Heights. It was ratified by the Knesset by a vote of 63–21, on 14 December 1981. Although the law did not use the term, it was considered by the international community and some members of the Israeli opposition as an annexation of the territory and therefore illegitimate. The government of Syria said that the law amounted to "an act of war."

== Background ==
The Golan Heights is a geographic area in southwestern Syria. The Druze are an ethnoreligious community with a strong presence in the Golan Heights, the north of Israel, and the south of Syria. The Heights have been continuously militarily occupied by Israel since Israel's victory over an Arab coalition that included Syria in the 1967 Six-Day War. The Israeli occupation and annexation has been repeatedly condemned by the United Nations and the international community. Since its occupation began, the Israeli government has promoted Israeli settlements in the Golan Heights, with around 7000 settlers present by 1981. In February 1981, a poll by The Jerusalem Post found that 68,3% of Israelis supported the occupation of the Heights.

In 1979, Israel signed a peace treaty with Egypt, which included Israeli withdrawal from the Sinai Peninsula, which had also been occupied following the Six-Day War.

In March 1981, the far-right Tehiya party presented a bill to the Knesset calling for Israel to annex the Golan Heights. The bill was defeated by 45 to 14, with 5 absentions and 56 MKs not present at the vote. Most MKs of the Likud-led government coalition, including Israeli Prime Minister Menachem Begin, voted against the bill. Minister of Agriculture Ariel Sharon and Foreign Affairs and Security Committee chair Moshe Arens, however, voted in favour of the bill. In June 1981, the 1981 Israeli legislative election was held, resulting in the Likud-led coalition under Begin retaining power and forming the nineteenth government of Israel.

== Summary ==
The three broad provisions in the Golan Heights Law are the following:

1. "The Law, jurisdiction and administration of the State will take effect in the Golan Heights, as described in the Schedule."
2. "This Law will begin taking effect on the day of its acceptance in the Knesset."
3. "The Minister of the Interior is placed in-charge of the implementation of this Law, and is entitled, in consultation with the Minister of Justice, to enact regulations for its implementation and to formulate regulations on interim provisions regarding the continued application of regulations, directives, administrative directives, and rights and duties that were in effect in the Golan Heights prior to the acceptance of this Law."

Signed:

- Yitzhak Navon (President)
- Menachem Begin (Prime Minister)
- Yosef Burg (Interior Minister)

== Legislative history ==
On 10 December 1981, while recovering from medical treatment in the Hadassah Medical Center for a broken hip, Begin secretly asked Attorney General of Israel Yitzhak Zamir to prepare a bill for the annexation of the Golan Heights. According to George Russell of Time Magazine, Begin's move was motivated by: pressure from the religious parties in his governing coalition, his decision to include annexation in Likud's June 1981 election manifesto, the failure of American diplomat Philip C. Habib to convince the Syrian government to withdraw from the Lebanese Beqaa Valley, and the Syrian government's open opposition to the Arab League's Fahd Plan.

Several days later, United States Secretary of State Alexander Haig announced that he would be cancelling a planned visit to the Middle East due to the martial law crisis in Poland. Early in the morning of 14 December, after receiving confirmation of the cancellation, Begin summoned Minister of Foreign Affairs Yitzhak Shamir and Minister of Defence Ariel Sharon to his room in the Hadassah Medical Center, where the three agreed that the crisis in Poland, as well as the fact that the two most prominent figures in the opposition Labor Party (Labor leader Shimon Peres and Yitzhak Rabin) were out of the country, provided them with an opportunity. Later that morning, Begin left the Medical Center to convene the Israeli government at his home for a special cabinet session. In that session, Begin presented the legislation to the cabinet, who voted almost unanimously to approve it.

Less than two hours later, the Israeli government presented the bill to the Knesset. In his speech to the Knesset, Begin claimed that there was a "nearly universal national consensus" in Israel on the question of the Golan Heights, pledging that "Israel will not descend from the Golan Heights and will not remove a single settlement." Begin further justified the bill by saying that Israel could not "wait for an unlimited period of time for a sign from the Syrians that they are prepared to talk with us about peace", and that the bill was necessary for historical, security, and "moral-political" purposes. Begin further stated that "no one will push us back to the borders of June 4, 1967—those borders of bloodshed, provocation and aggression."

All three readings of the legislation were carried out on the same day, an unusually fast-paced legislative process. The attempt to rush the bill through the Knesset proved immediately controversial, with the Israeli Labor Party announcing that it intended to boycott the votes. However, the bill was ultimately passed in the Knesset by the end of the day, with a majority of 63 in favour to 21 against. Left-wing party Hadash and liberal party Shinui voted against. Some Israeli Labor Party MKs ultimately participated in the vote, with 7 voting against the bill and 10 voting in favour.

Following the vote, Israeli Chief of the General Staff Rafael Eitan cut short a visit to Egypt, and ordered soldiers in northern Israel and the Golan Heights to high alert.

== Reactions ==
=== In Syria ===
The Syrian government declared that the law was an "act of war."

The law led to widespread protests by the Druze community in the Golan heights. On 17 December, the Druze community in the Heights launched a three-day general strike in protest against the law. The leaders of the Druze community wrote a letter to Israeli Prime Minister Menachem Begin that they were "first of all Syrian Arabs", warning that they "do not intend to act against the state's security, but we will resist if you force us to be Israeli citizens." In early 1982, the 1982 Golan Heights Druze general strike was held, lasting for five months and resulting in an Israeli blockade of Druze towns in the Heights.

Israeli settlers in the Heights celebrated the law.

=== In Israel ===
Substantially, the law has mainly been criticized for potentially hindering future negotiations with Syria. Uzi Benziman of Haaretz stated that the law "is liable to pull the rug out from under Israel's primary political foundation - the Camp David Accords."

Yitzhak Rabin of the Israeli Labor Party, who had served as Israeli Prime Minister from 1974 to 1977, and would later serve a second term from 1992 to 1995, stated that he opposed the timing of the law, but that he agreed that "the Golan Heights must be part of Israel and that even in a Syrian-Israeli peace treaty Israel should not go down from them." The Labor MKs who defied the party boycott were not disciplined. The Knesset voted against a motion of no confidence in Begin's government over the law by 57 to 47.

Minister of Defence Ariel Sharon stated that Israel was "forced to pass the annexation law to make it clear to Washington that we will not return to the indefensible 1967 lines". This mirrors Israeli strategic arguments, including those linking control of the Golan Heights to important security consideration (e.g., territorial depth and regional military threats), and to the more general experience of persistent conflict with neighbouring in Arab states.

Jewish Agency for Israel chair Rafael Kotlowitz called for the law to "kindle the spark of aliyah among diaspora youth", pledging that the Agency would "bring the word of the new law to the diaspora as a challenge and as a national goal, and we will do all we can to channel new olim to the Golan." Permanent Representative of Israel to the United Nations Yehuda Zvi Blum described the law as necessary "to regularize the situation" in the Golan Heights, saying that "all daily life on the Golan Heights, both of the Israeli residents and the Druze inhabitants, is with Israel." Israeli consul-general in New York City Naphtali Lau-Lavie stated that Israel could not "sit idly and not give its citizens and settlements on the Golan Heights the same civilian and juridical status that any other citizens now have."

While the Israeli public at large, and especially the law's critics, viewed it as an annexation, the law avoids the use of the word. Prime Minister Menachem Begin responded to Amnon Rubinstein's criticism by saying, "You use the word 'annexation.' I do not use it", and noting that similar wording was used in a 1967 law authorizing the government to apply Israeli law to any part of the Land of Israel.

=== Internationally ===
The law provoked strong international criticism and was not recognised internationally. On 17 December 1981, the United Nations Security Council unanimously and without abstentions passed Resolution 497 deeming the law "null and void and without international legal effect."

The European Economic Community described the law as "tantamount to annexation and contrary to international law and therefore invalid in our eyes", adding that it was "bound to complicate further the search for a comprehensive settlement." British Prime Minister Margaret Thatcher condemned the law, stating that "I say with the sorrow of a friend that this latest move is harmful to the search for peace." The French government released a statement condemening the law as "contrary to international law and United Nations Resolutions on the subject", while French Foreign Minister Claude Cheysson stated that "the annexation is unacceptable. We can do nothing but condemn it."

Singaporean newspaper The Straits Times described the law in an editorial as "only the latest in a series of dramatic moves by Israeli Prime Minister Begin which have lost the country much international sympathy", warning that it would "jeopardise the present unsteady search for a Middle East peace." Vatican City newspaper L'Osservatore Romano described the law as "a disturbance and hindrance" of the Middle East peace process, accusing the Israeli government of "contradictions of one who, on the one hand accuses others of closing themselves into positions of refusal, and on the other, accumulates faits accomplis not sanctioned by international law which aggravate an already difficult situation."

=== United States ===
American president Ronald Reagan stated that the law "increased the difficulty of seeking peace", but that "we continue to be optimistic." The government of the United States temporarily suspended the Strategic Cooperation Agreement that it had signed with Israel in November 1981 over the law. Spokesperson for the United States Department of State Dean E. Fischer stated that the law was passed without consulting the United States, saying that "we are particularly disappointed that the Government of Israel took this action just as we were facing a serious political crisis in Poland and only a few weeks after we signed a Memorandum of Understanding on Strategic Cooperation."

The Israeli Ministry of Foreign Affairs subsequently claimed that former American president Gerald Ford had told the Israeli government that the United States would support annexation. In his speech to the Knesset presenting the bill, Begin had stated that the Israeli government was aware the US would oppose the bill, and so had "consciously decided not to ask, since we had no doubt that our American friends would tell us no, and with all due respect, we could not take this no into account."

American Jewish Congress director Henry Siegman condemned the suspension of the Agreement, calling it an "intemperate response to Israel's decision to formalize her administrative jurisdiction over the Golan Heights." Conference of Presidents of Major American Jewish Organizations chair Howard Squadron accused the American government of having "joined the lynch mob at the UN in supporting the Soviet satellite Syria—a state that refuses to make peace (with Israel)—while punishing our friend and ally, Israel." Zionist Organization of America president Joseph Sternstein described the law as "a necessary and just step", saying that it "will quickly stabilize the situation on the Golan Heights." The New Jewish Agenda condemned the law, calling for "a land of peace, not a piece of land."

David K. Shipler of The New York Times stated that the law would have the effect of "cutting down the options for future territorial compromise with the Arabs" and that "withdrawal from land now considered Israel's own would be psychologically more difficult, and especially so if Israeli civilian development spreads more deeply into the region. There are now 31 Jewish settlements there, with a population of about 7,000."

== Aftermath ==
The Golan Heights Druze have held annual demonstrations in February commemorating the general strike against the law.

In February 2018, the Prime Minister of Israel Benjamin Netanyahu stated that "the Golan Heights will remain Israel's forever", after his political rival Yair Lapid called on the international community to recognize Israeli sovereignty over the Golan Heights two months earlier. On 25 March 2019, the United States recognized the Golan Heights as sovereign Israeli territory while the UN reaffirmed that the "..status of Golan has not changed". In 2026, Colombia became the second country to recognize Israeli sovereignty over the Golan Heights. Colombia's recognition was condemned by Syria, Saudi Arabia, Egypt, Jordan, Qatar, Kuwait and Iraq. The Secretary-General of the Gulf Cooperation Council issued a statement condemning Colombia's recognition and stated that it violates international law. The United Nations Deputy Special Envoy for Syria Claudio Cordone stated that: "As most recently reaffirmed by Secretary-General António Guterres in Damascus, the Golan Heights are occupied Syrian territory. Colombia’s acceptance of Israel’s annexation of this territory directly contravenes international law."

== See also ==
- United States recognition of the Golan Heights as part of Israel
- International law and the Arab-Israeli conflict
- Jerusalem Law
