= United States recognition of the Golan Heights as part of Israel =

2019 U.S. recognition of Israeli sovereignty over Syria's Golan Heights

Proclamation on Recognizing the Golan Heights as Part of the State of Israel
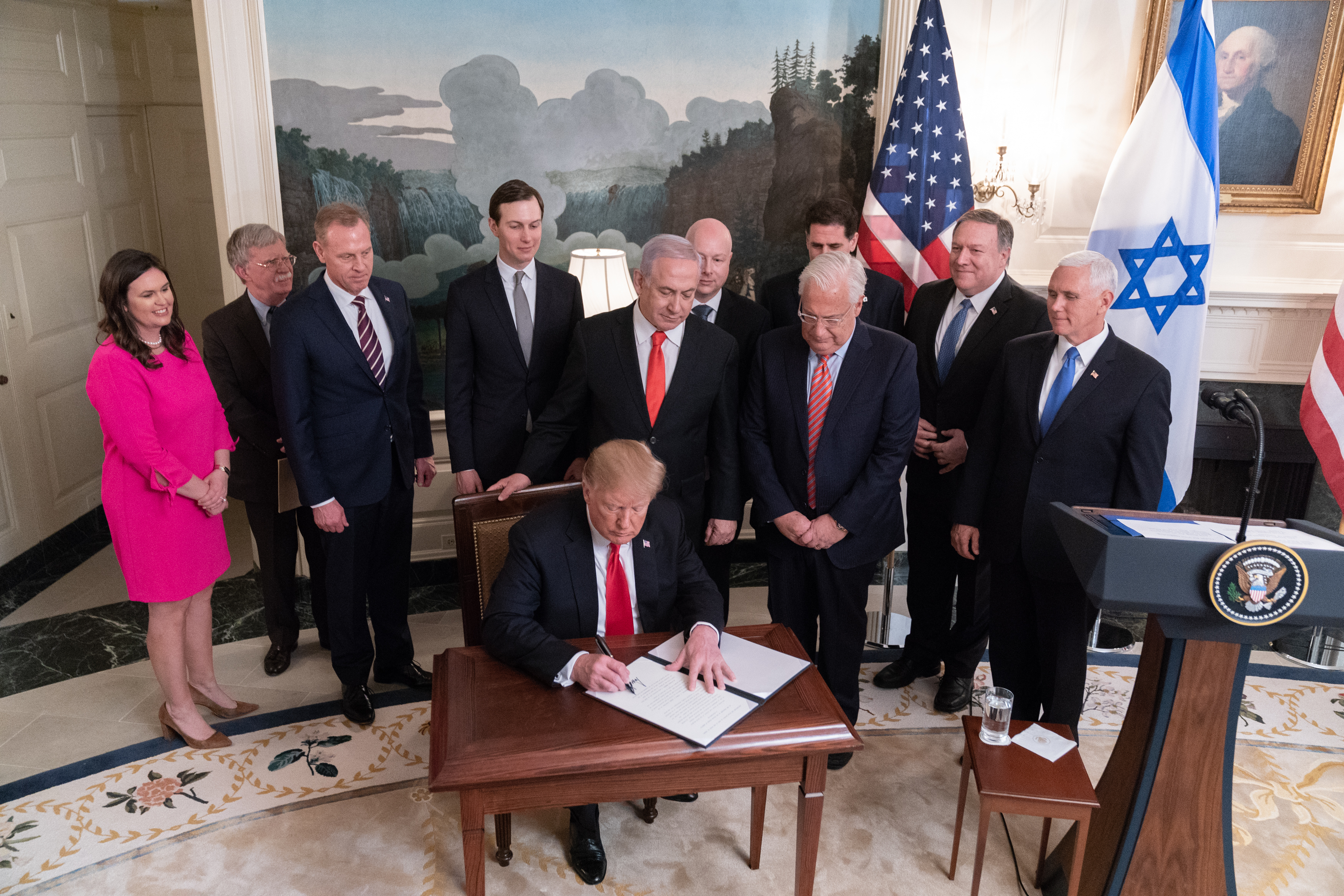
- American president Donald Trump, accompanied by Israeli prime minister Benjamin Netanyahu, signing the document of recognition at the White House

U.S. Presidential Proclamation
- Territorial extent: United States; Israel; Syria (Note: The international community recognizes the Golan Heights as being under Syrian sovereignty, and likewise falling under what are internationally recognized as Israeli-occupied territories.)
- Signed by: Donald Trump
- Signed: March 25, 2019
- Status: Current legislation

On March 25, 2019, the United States officially recognized the Golan Heights as being under the sovereignty of Israel. Signed into effect by the Trump administration, the U.S. presidential proclamation marked the first instance of any country recognizing Israeli sovereignty over the Golan Heights. The territory is considered part of Syria under international law, and the rest of the international community does not recognize Israeli sovereignty, regarding the land as Israeli-occupied following the 1967 Arab–Israeli War. In 1981, Israel's government passed the Golan Heights Law — a de facto annexation of the territory.

Israeli officials lobbied the United States into recognizing "Israeli sovereignty" over the territory. The U.S. recognition was seen as a political gift from American president Donald Trump, in a bid to help Israeli prime minister Benjamin Netanyahu gain a favorable standing among voters in the then-upcoming April 2019 legislative election. It was condemned by a number of countries and organizations, including the United Nations and the European Union (see § Reactions). The Syrian government rejected the U.S. statement, describing it as a "blatant attack" on Syria's sovereignty and territorial integrity. The recognition continued under the successor Biden administration.

== Background ==
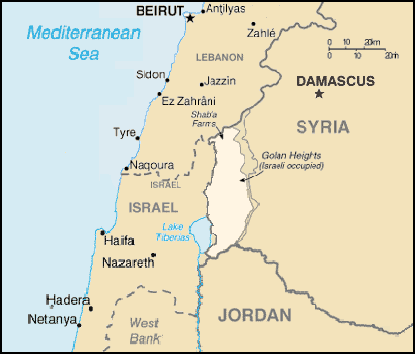
Location of the Golan Heights, between Israel and Syria (under Israeli control since the 1967 Arab–Israeli War)

During the 1967 Arab–Israeli War, Israel captured the Golan Heights from Syria. In 1981, the Israeli government effectively annexed the territory through the Golan Heights Law, in a move that was not internationally recognized. Since 1967, the United Nations has recognized the Golan Heights as Syrian territory under an Israeli military occupation.

Prior to the U.S. recognition of the Golan Heights as Israeli territory in March 2019, the Trump administration had signed another presidential proclamation in December 2017, in which the U.S. recognized Jerusalem as the capital city of Israel. Subsequently, the American diplomatic mission to Israel was relocated from Tel Aviv to Jerusalem (see Embassy of the United States, Jerusalem); the recognition and relocation was largely condemned by the international community, as the United Nations recognizes the city as a central negotiating block for the Israeli–Palestinian peace process. Though Israeli sovereignty over West Jerusalem is widely accepted, East Jerusalem is viewed as being under an Israeli military occupation.

== Announcement ==
On March 21, 2019, U.S. president Donald Trump tweeted that it was "time for the United States to fully recognize Israel's sovereignty over the Golan Heights." The move was welcomed by Israel. Dozens of people from the Druze community in the Golan Heights protested against Trump's announcement.

Four days later, on 25 March 2019, in a joint press conference in Washington with Israeli prime minister Benjamin Netanyahu, Trump signed a proclamation stating that "the United States recognizes that the Golan Heights are part of the State of Israel."

The proclamation was signed in the context of Trump accusing his political opponents of allegedly making "anti-Semitic" comments in prior weeks. Trump designed the proclamation signing and Netanyahu's visit to the United States just two weeks prior to the April 2019 Israeli legislative election as a boost to Netanyahu's bid. The proclamation was also expected to raise Trump's popularity amongst pro-Israel voters in the United States.

== Justification for the proclamation ==
=== American officials ===
The proclamation cited "aggressive acts by Iran and terrorist groups, including Hizballah, in southern Syria" as justification for Israel to maintain sovereignty over the Golan Heights as Israel has a "need to protect itself from Syria and other regional threats."

In refuting a comparison to Russia's annexation of Crimea, Secretary of State Mike Pompeo said "What the President did with the Golan Heights is recognize the reality on the ground and the security situation necessary for the protection of the Israeli state. It’s that simple".

A State Department spokesperson claimed the day following the proclamation that "Israel gained control of the Golan through its legitimate response to Syrian aggression aimed at Israel’s destruction. Russia has occupied Crimea despite the fact that it has recognized Crimea as part of Ukraine in bilateral agreements and despite its international obligations and commitments, including core OSCE principles.”

=== Israeli officials ===
Netanyahu claimed at the press conference following the announcement that "Israel won the Golan Heights in a just war of self-defence," referring to the 1967 war that began with Israeli-launched strikes against Egypt which were later defended on grounds of pre-emption, and then were followed by Syrian attacks on Israel.

== Reactions ==
The United Nations Secretary-General António Guterres said that "the status of Golan has not changed," and the US's move resulted in condemnation, criticism or rejection from the European Union, United Kingdom, Germany, France, Belgium, Spain, Poland, South Africa, Turkey, Egypt, the Arab League, Russia, Ireland, Saudi Arabia, Oman, the United Arab Emirates, Bahrain, Qatar, Kuwait, Jordan, Iraq, Iran, Mauritania, Morocco, Tunisia, Somalia, Lebanon, Japan, Cuba, Venezuela, Indonesia, Canada, Pakistan, Sudan, Malaysia, Vietnam, and China.

Syria called the move a "blatant attack" on its sovereignty and territorial integrity and maintained that it had a right to reclaim the territory. The state-owned news organization Syrian Arab News Agency reported that protests were held in several Syrian provinces against Trump's declaration. Hezbollah's Hassan Nasrallah, whose group was mentioned as a threat to Israel in the proclamation, stated that "resistance, resistance, and resistance" was the only way to take back the Israeli-occupied territories.

The move was praised by Israeli leaders across the political spectrum, including President Reuven Rivlin, Opposition Leader Shelly Yachimovich, Labor leader Avi Gabbay, Blue and White leader Benny Gantz, Speaker Yuli Edelstein, Kulanu leader Moshe Kahlon, and New Right co-leaders Naftali Bennett and Ayelet Shaked.

== Aftermath ==
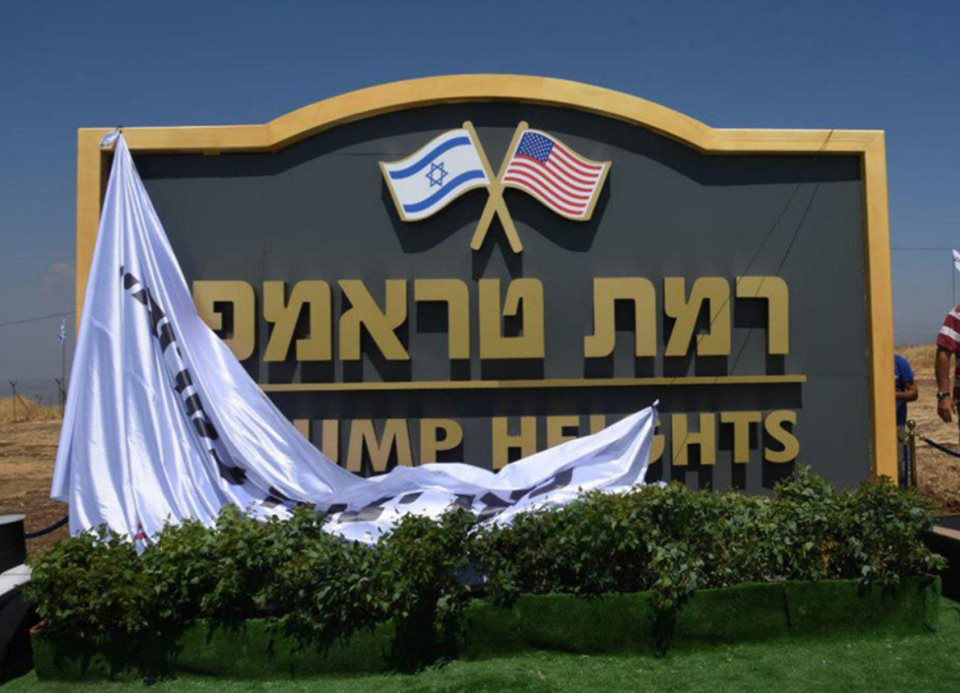
Unveiling of the sign to Trump Heights in June 2019

On April 23, 2019, Israel Prime Minister Benjamin Netanyahu announced that he will bring a resolution for government approval to name a new community in the Golan Heights after Trump. On June 16, 2019, Israel announced the establishment of Trump Heights, a planned settlement in the Golan Heights.

== See also ==
- United States recognition of Jerusalem as capital of Israel
- Israel–United States relations
- Israel–Syria relations
- Syria–United States relations
