= Kela Alon =

Israeli settlement in the Golan Heights

Kela Alon: קלע אלון (Hebrew)
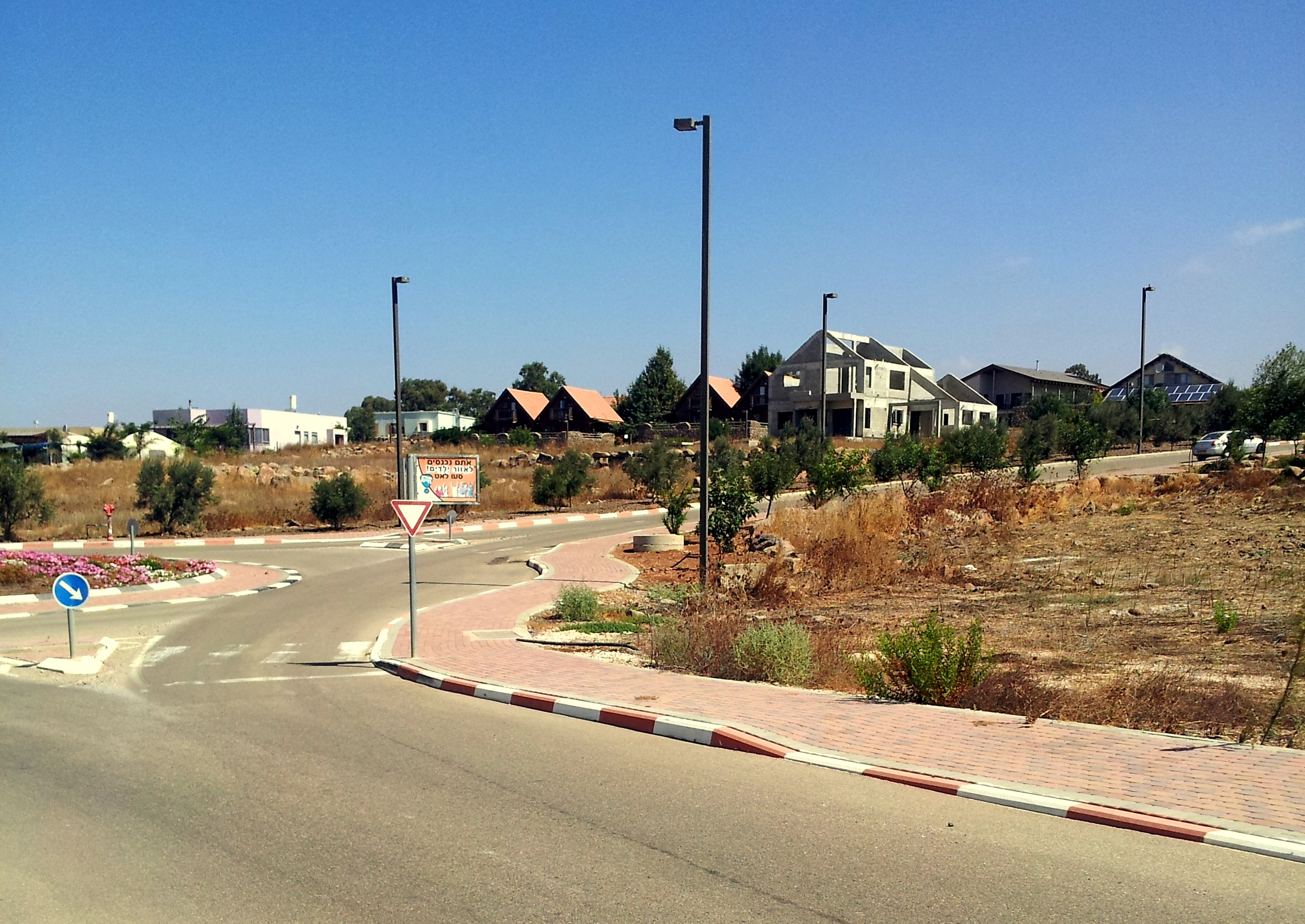

- Location within the Golan Heights Location within the Golan Heights
- Coordinates: 33°7′55″N 35°41′11″E
- Country: Golan Heights (Internationally recognized as Syrian territory occupied by Israel.)
- District: Northern
- Subdistrict: Golan
- Council: Golan
- Region: Golan Heights
- Affiliation: Mishkei Herut Beitar
- Founded: 1981 (original); 1991 (re-establishment)
- Population (2024): 414

Kela Alon (Hebrew: קלע אלון) is an Israeli settlement organized as a community settlement in the Golan Heights. Falling under the municipal jurisdiction of Golan Regional Council, in 2024 it had a population of 414.

The international community considers Israeli settlements in the Golan Heights illegal under international law, but the Israeli government disputes this. Ramat Trump is a planned community located near Kela Alon.

== History ==
Until depopulation in 1967, the place was occupied by the Syrian village of Qanaabé (Kana'beh), which had approximately 480 inhabitants. The area was settled by Israelis in 1981 and is initially Nahal settlement. However, the proximity of military areas and the presence of land mines caused it to be abandoned in 1988. The modern settlement was established in 1991 and was originally called "Bruchim" (Hebrew: ברוכים). The first settlers were immigrants from the 1990s from the Soviet Union. The current name was adopted in 1997. A new neighborhood was built in 2003, also known as Mazok Orvim (Hebrew: מצוק עורבים).

== Transportation ==
The Golan Regional Council operates eight buses per day from Kela Alon to the Israeli city of Kiryat Shmona. The bus line begins at Katzrin, and also stops at Kidmat Tzvi, Ortal, Ein Zivan, and Merom Golan. The bus ride to Kiryat Shmona takes approximately 21 minutes. Kela Alon is located close to Highway 959, which runs east-west through the northern Golan Heights.

== See also ==
- Northern District (Israel)
- Israeli-occupied territories
