= Petroleum Road =

Privately owned road in Israel

Coordinates: 33°0′55″N 35°45′58″E

- Tapline Road
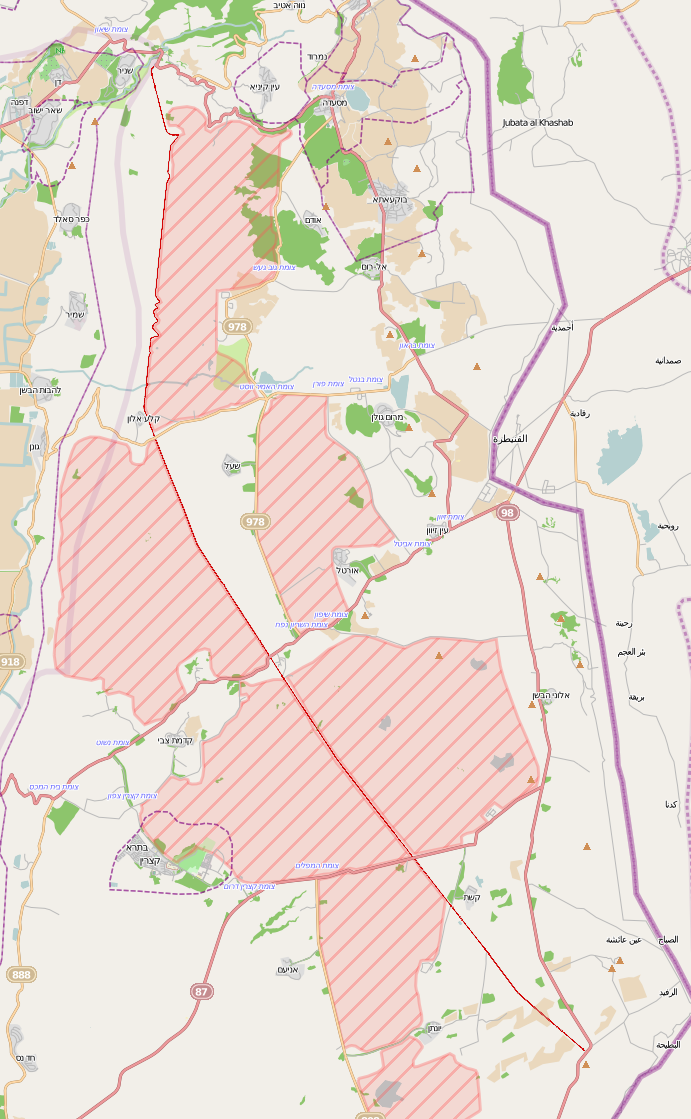

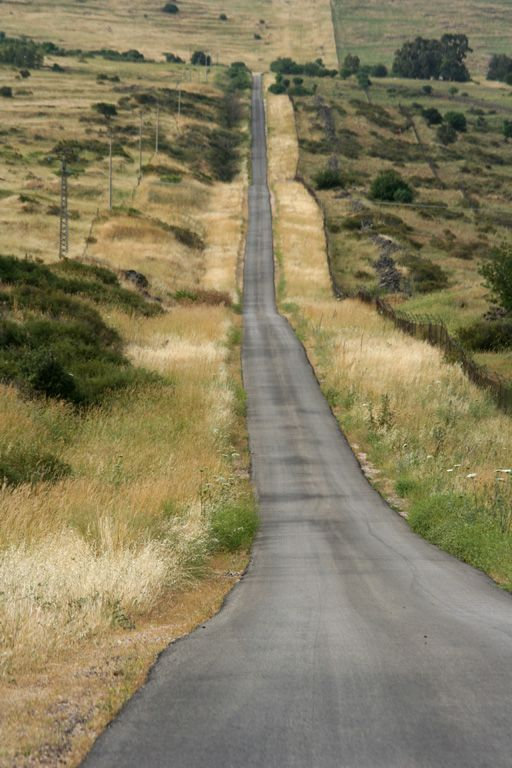
- The Petroleum Road

Route information
- Length: 45 km (28 mi)

Major junctions
- South end: Orha Junction
- North end: Ghajar

The Petroleum Road or Tapline Road (Hebrew: כביש הנפט, Kvish HaNeft) is a 47 km (29 mi) long, privately owned north-south asphalt road in the Golan Heights. The name Petroleum Road derives from the now defunct oil pipeline of the Trans-Arabian Pipeline Company, which the road runs adjacent to. It begins near Mount Peres on the east edge of the central Golan and ends in the northern Golan near the Israeli-occupied Golan-Lebanese frontier, nearby Ghajar.

Most of it is marked on maps as inaccessible because of poor road quality. (Note: The Hebrew guide מדריך כרטא, (Madrikh Karta), by Azaria Alon, ISBN 965-220-528-1, uses the term כביש משובש ("broken road") for the entire route. Another map, published by Mapa (http://www.mapa.co.il) in 2001, uses a similar term for the portion between Highway 91 and Route 959.)

Since the road diagonally bisects the entire length of the northern portion of the Golan Heights, it was the site of many battles fought along its axis during the Yom Kippur War in 1973.

== The Trans-Arabian Pipeline ==
The Trans-Arabian Pipeline was established as part of a joint initiative of several American companies, and it stretches 1,214 km from Qaisumah in Saudi Arabia to the port of Sidon in Lebanon. During the Six-Day War, Israel took control of a 47 km section of the pipeline but permitted its operation to continue. However, due to various problems, the pipeline fell out of use.

In May 1969, PFLP fighters from Lebanon infiltrated and blew up the pipeline in the area near Ghajar. 8,000 tons of oil spilled into Nahal Si'on and from there flowed through the Banias River and the Jordan River to the Kinneret. Following this, the dirt road along the pipeline was paved and fenced. In September 1969, a Mekorot tractor hit a pipeline near Kibbutz Shamir.

The Golan Heights section stopped transporting petroleum in 1976. Today, the pipeline is used to transport water from various boreholes in the Golan.

== The road ==
The length of the road accompanying the Golan Heights pipeline is 45 km (28 mi). The southernmost 2 km were destroyed when Israel constructed its forward line of defensive fortifications opposite the ceasefire line between Israel and Syria after the Six-Day War. In addition, the northernmost 4 km is generally not considered part of the Petroleum Road but is rather part of Route 999.

Since the Petroleum Road is private, and not maintained by the Israeli transport authority, it has not been assigned a number.

In 2015, road renovation works were completed by the Israel Nature and Parks Authority. The section of the road between the Revaya junction and the Banias junction was renovated and was safe for all types of vehicles. As part of the works, four viewing points were erected along the section. Fences were also removed on part of the route to open an ecological corridor along the Golan.

=== Junctions (South to North) ===
District	Location	km	mi	Name	Destinations	Notes
Northern	Yonatan	0	0.0	צומת אורחה (Orha Junction)	Highway 98	
Northern	Keshet	8	5.0	צומת קשת (Keshet Junction)	Highway 87	
Northern	Camp Yitzhak	17	11	צומת נפח (Naffakh Junction)	Highway 91	
Northern	Kela Alon	26	16	צומת רוויה (Revaya Junction)	Route 959	
Northern	Banias	41	25	צומת בניאס (Banias Junction)	Highway 99	
Northern	Ghajar	45	28	גבול לבנון (Lebanese Border)		
1.000 mi = 1.609 km; 1.000 km = 0.621 mi

=== Places of interest on the route ===
- Mount Paras
- Keshet Yehonatan Field School in Keshet
- Memorial monument for the IDF's 188th Armored Brigade
- Orvim Creek Nature Preserve
- Camp Yitzhak
- A view of Tel Faher, where the Golani Brigade fought a battle
- Banias archaeological site
