= National Roads Company of Israel =

State-owned enterprise

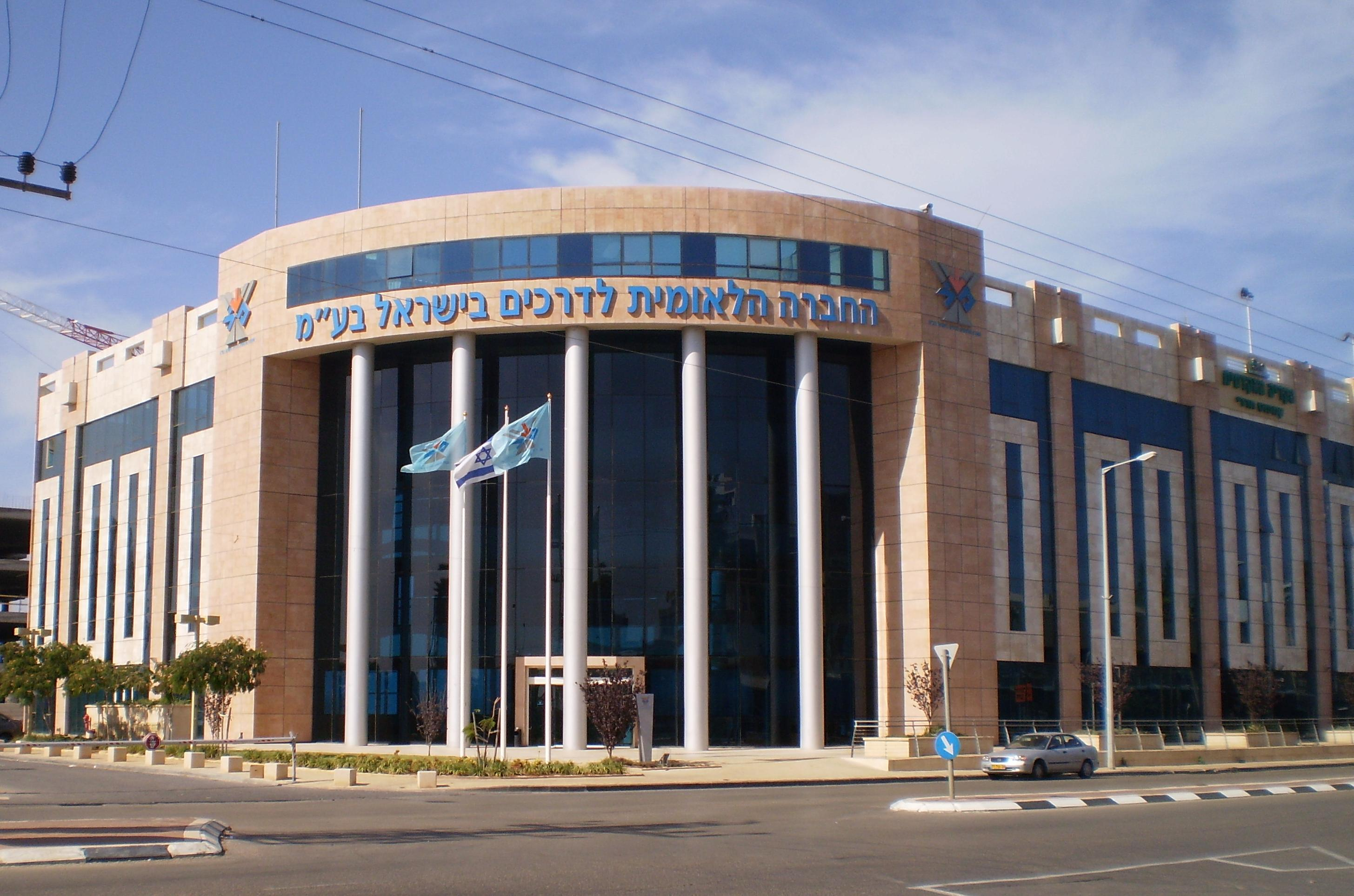
National Roads Company of Israel, Or Yehuda

Netivei Israel (Hebrew: נתיבי ישראל, romanized: Netivei Yisra'el, lit. Routes of Israel), formerly the National Roads Company of Israel (Hebrew: החברה הלאומית לדרכים בישראל, HaHevra HaLe'umit LiDrakhim BeYisra'el), also called National Roads Authority, is a government-owned corporation, in charge of planning, construction and maintenance of most road infrastructure in Israel, including roads, bridges and interchanges.

The National Road Company is the successor of the Public Works Department (PWD) of the Ministry of Transportation (PWD in Hebrew: מע"צ, Ma'atz), which was founded in 1921. On September 15, 2003 it was decided to reorganize Ma'atz and reconstitute it as a new government-owned corporation that would start operation on January 1, 2004. Since becoming the National Roads Company, the company usually no longer directly constructs new roads but rather plans then issues tenders for and manages new roads' construction by companies in the private sector. Beginning in 2010, the company has also been tasked with planning, issuing tenders for, and managing the construction of new railway lines for Israel Railways.

8,500 kilometers of roads, 105 interchanges, 2,200 intersections, and 1,300 bridges and tunnels fall under the company's responsibility. These constitute most of the inter-city roads in Israel. Other companies responsible for inter-city roads are Yefe Nof in Haifa, Netivei Ayalon in Gush Dan and Moriah in Jerusalem, as well as Derekh Eretz which is responsible for the Cross-Israel Highway and Netivei Yovel responsible for Highway 431. The budget of the company for 2008 was 2.805 billion shekels, 800 million of which were dedicated to road maintenance. The budget is expected to rise to 3.88 billion in 2009.
