= Majdal Shams attack =

2024 attack on Majdal Shams, Golan Heights

- Part of the Israel–Hezbollah conflict (2023–present)
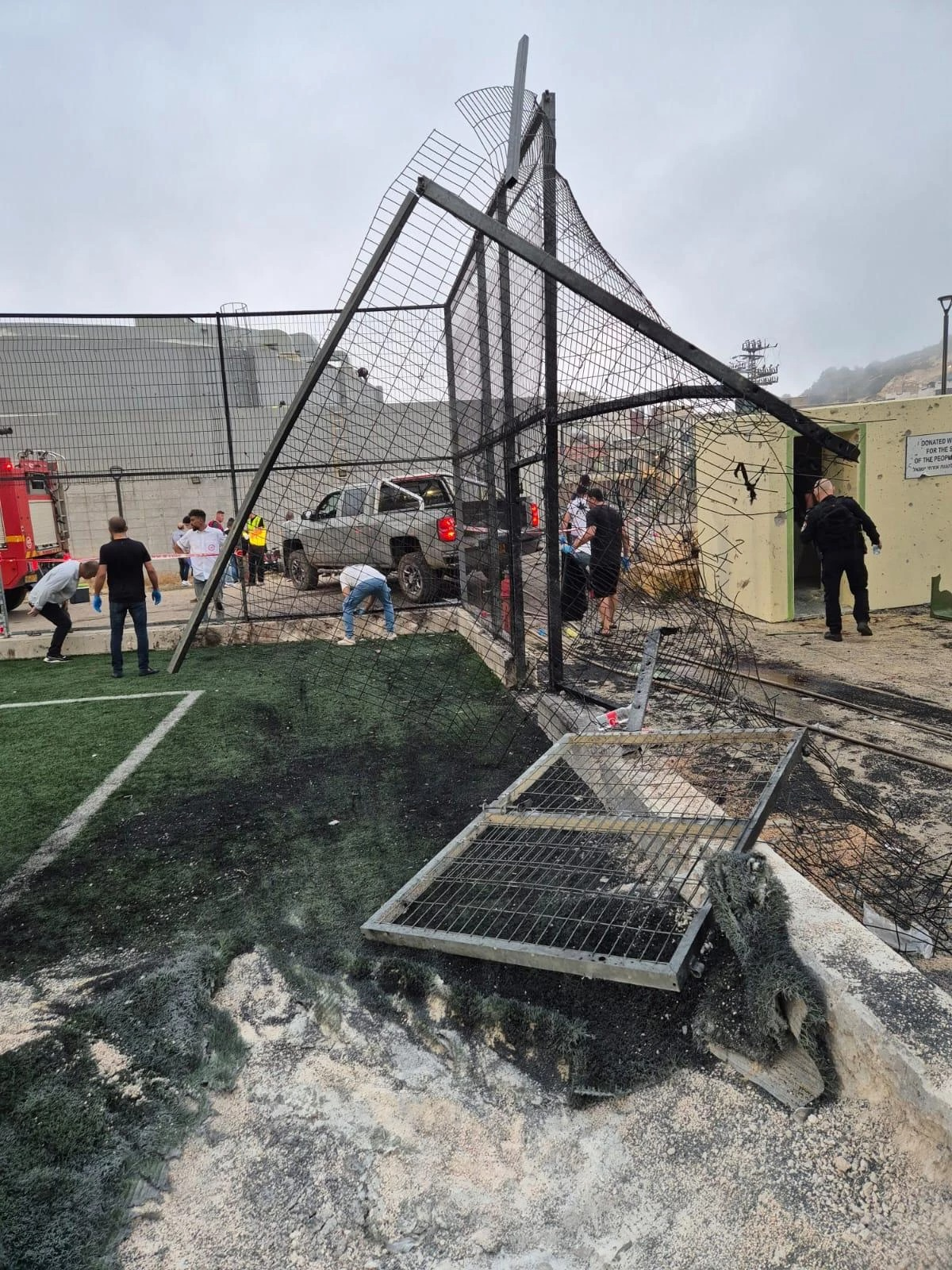
- Site of attack on Majdal Shams soccer field

- Location within the Golan
- Location: 33°15′58.4″N 35°46′05.9″E; Majdal Shams, Israeli-occupied Golan Heights
- Date: 27 July 2024; 6:18 pm (UTC+02:00)
- Attack type: Rocket attack (according to Israel and the United States)
- Deaths: 12 Syrian Druze children
- Injuries: At least 42
- Accused: Hezbollah (accused by Israel and the United States)

The Majdal Shams attack took place on 27 July 2024, when a rocket hit a soccer field in Majdal Shams in the Israeli-occupied Golan Heights. (Note: Israel captured the territory from Syria during the 1967 Six-Day War and later annexed it. Most of the international community considers the territory to be part of Israeli-occupied Syria, though this is disputed by Israel, the United States, and Colombia; the United States was lobbied by Israeli officials into recognizing Israeli sovereignty over the territory.) The resulting blast killed 12 Syrian children belonging to the Druze community and injured at least 42 others, with most of the victims being between the ages of 10 and 16.

Israel blamed Hezbollah for carrying out the attack with an Iranian-made Falaq-1 rocket equipped with a 53-kilogram warhead. According to Hezbollah, the target was a nearby military base and the soccer field was hit by an errant Israeli Iron Dome air defence projectile. Western sources dismissed this claim, citing expert opinion that the rocket had been fired by Hezbollah or another militant group in Lebanon.

Local authorities denied that the children were Israeli and local residents protested the attendance of Israeli ministers at the funeral, for reasons ranging from opposition to politicization of the tragedy, to anger at the Israeli government's perceived neglect of their safety.

The attack occurred amid the Hezbollah–Israel conflict that has been ongoing since 8 October 2023, a regular exchange of attacks that began following the outbreak of the Gaza war. Following the attack, Israel killed Hezbollah commander Fuad Shukr.

== Background ==
=== Majdal Shams ===
Majdal Shams is a predominantly Druze town in the Israeli-occupied Golan Heights, The Golan Heights are a rocky plateau in the Levant region of Western Asia that was captured by Israel from Syria in the 1967 Six-Day War. The international community, with the exception of Israel, the United States, and Colombia, considers the Golan Heights to be Syrian territory held by Israel under military occupation.

=== Israel–Hezbollah conflict ===
Following the 7 October attack, Hezbollah joined the conflict the next day, launching guided rockets and drone attacks at Israeli communities and military installations in Galilee and the Golan Heights. This Israel–Hezbollah conflict has displaced entire communities in Israel and Lebanon, with significant damage to buildings and land along the border. As of 5 July 2024, Israel reports having killed approximately 366 Hezbollah operatives with over 100 Lebanese civilians confirmed killed. According to the UN, over 90,000 people in Lebanon have been forced to flee their homes, while in Israel, 60,000 civilians have evacuated. Israel and Hezbollah have maintained their attacks at a level that causes significant harm without escalating into a full-scale war. From 7 October 2023 to 21 June 2024, Israel attacked Lebanon 6,124 times. Hezbollah and other Lebanese forces attacked Israel 1,258 times.

Hezbollah employed advanced Iranian-origin missiles, including the Falaq-1 rocket system, in its attacks against Israel. Following a similar attack in June which injured civilians on a soccer field in the Druze town of Hurfeish, Israel said it targeted military sites deep within Lebanon in response.

== Attack ==
Early in the morning, Hezbollah took responsibility for multiple attacks including one with a Falaq-type rocket on the military headquarters of the Hermon Brigade, which was 3 km from the football pitch. At 6:18 pm, alarms sounded in Majdal Shams. A projectile then hit and exploded at a soccer field in the town, located near a playground. According to initial reports, eleven people were wounded, with five in critical condition and six in serious condition. Emergency services, including Magen David Adom (MDA), treated the critically injured, aged between 10 and 20, some of whom were transferred to local clinics. A senior MDA paramedic described the scene as one of destruction with victims lying on the grass.

According to residents, the children were playing soccer during the attack and while the warning siren activated, it was only a few seconds before the rocket hit the field leaving no time to seek shelter.

=== Victims ===
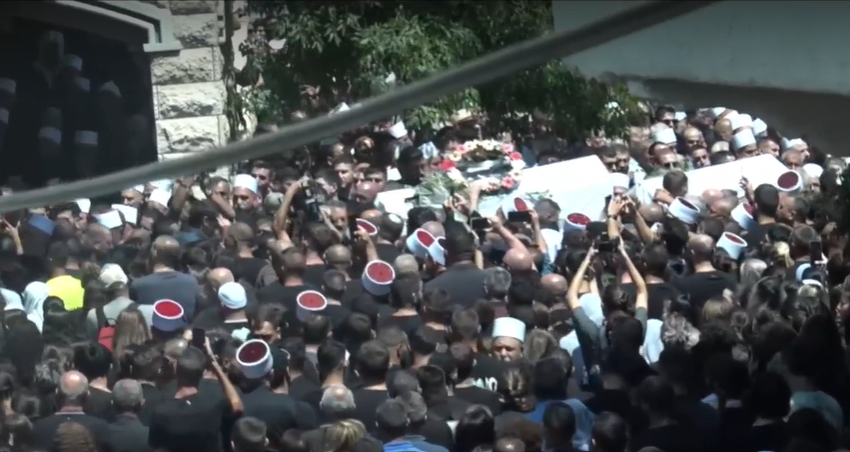
A funeral of the deceased a day after the attack

Twelve children, ranging in age between ten and sixteen years old, were killed in the attack. At least 42 others were injured. None of the 12 children and teens killed had Israeli citizenship. Although accepting Israeli citizenship is an option available for Druze in the Golan Heights, at the time of the attack, about 75% of the population of Majdal Shams had rejected Israeli citizenship and identified as Syrian.

Since the attack, Israel's Population and Immigration Authority says the number of Druze residents applying for Israeli citizenship has risen.

=== Analysis ===
The IDF stated that they had performed an assessment and concluded that Hezbollah was responsible for the rocket attack. IDF spokesman Daniel Hagari stated that the type of rocket used was an Iranian-made Falaq-1, carrying a 50 kg warhead, which has previously been used by Hezbollah, the only Iranian proxy to possess it. The Israeli army posted pictures of Falaq-1 shrapnel that it said was found at the scene of the attack, but with no apparent pictures of the shrapnel in situ at the blast site.

A Hezbollah spokesperson, Mohammad Afif, later said that the group was not responsible for the attack on Majdal Shams. instead stating it was caused by an Israeli Iron Dome projectile launched in the course of countering Hezbollah rocket fire aiming for Israeli military sites. Iranian and Qatari state media claimed there were reports that an Iron Dome interceptor was to blame. Additionally, Al-Mayadeen, a Lebanese outlet with close ties to Hezbollah, stated that the blast site was inconsistent with a Falaq-1, which it said would have left a larger impact crater; subsequent to the report, the Israeli government voted to ban Al-Mayadeen from operating inside Israel.

According to US intelligence, there were no doubts that Hezbollah was responsible but it was not certain if Hezbollah intentionally targeted the site or misfired.

Israeli authorities have characterized it as the deadliest attack on their civilians since the 7 October attacks. Israeli Police and Northern District detectives secured the crash site to eliminate any further risk to the public and conducted a search for additional remains.

Colonel Avichay Adraee, the IDF's Arabic-language spokesman, said the rocket attack was launched by Ali Muhammad Yahya, who is a commander at a rocket launching site in Chebaa. Daniel Sobelman from Harvard Kennedy School highlighted that the strike was "the most serious in Israel in nine months of fighting between the country and militants in Lebanon." The Associated Press described the civilian death toll as the highest in Israel since Hamas’ October 7 attack, and that it was unclear what Hezbollah, who made a rare denial of the attack, would have gained from attacking Druze in Golan who see themselves as Syrian citizens, as it would hurt their influence in Lebanon.

The Associated Press reported that rocket sirens sounded less than a minute before the explosion, which left a crater 2 meters wide. Irregularly-shaped shrapnel recovered from the children's bodies indicated that the strike was not caused by a malfunctioning air defense missile. Associated Press reporters found no ordinance debris at the site, and were unable to verify the provenance of rocket fragments in images released by Israel, however, weapons experts consulted by the Associated Press said the evidence suggests a rocket from Lebanon struck the field. Richard Weir from Human Rights Watch noted that the damage is "consistent with that of a rocket artillery of the type and size of the Falaq", an Iranian-made rocket used by Hezbollah, adding it could have been a missile that overshot its target Israeli military position on Mount Hermon, either due to human error or mechanical fault. Chris Cobb-Smith observed that the shape of the crater and the damage direction imply the rocket came from the north. He also stated that it was impossible to prove who was responsible without independent verification of the weapon's remains.

Dr. Abed Kanaaneh, from the Moshe Dayan Center said: "The occupied Golan Heights were targeted by Hezbollah that day with 100 rockets, so it is plausible that one of them hit the village of Majdal Shams. The Druze were, of course, not the target, but one of these missiles could have missed its shot and caused the catastrophe."

== Aftermath ==
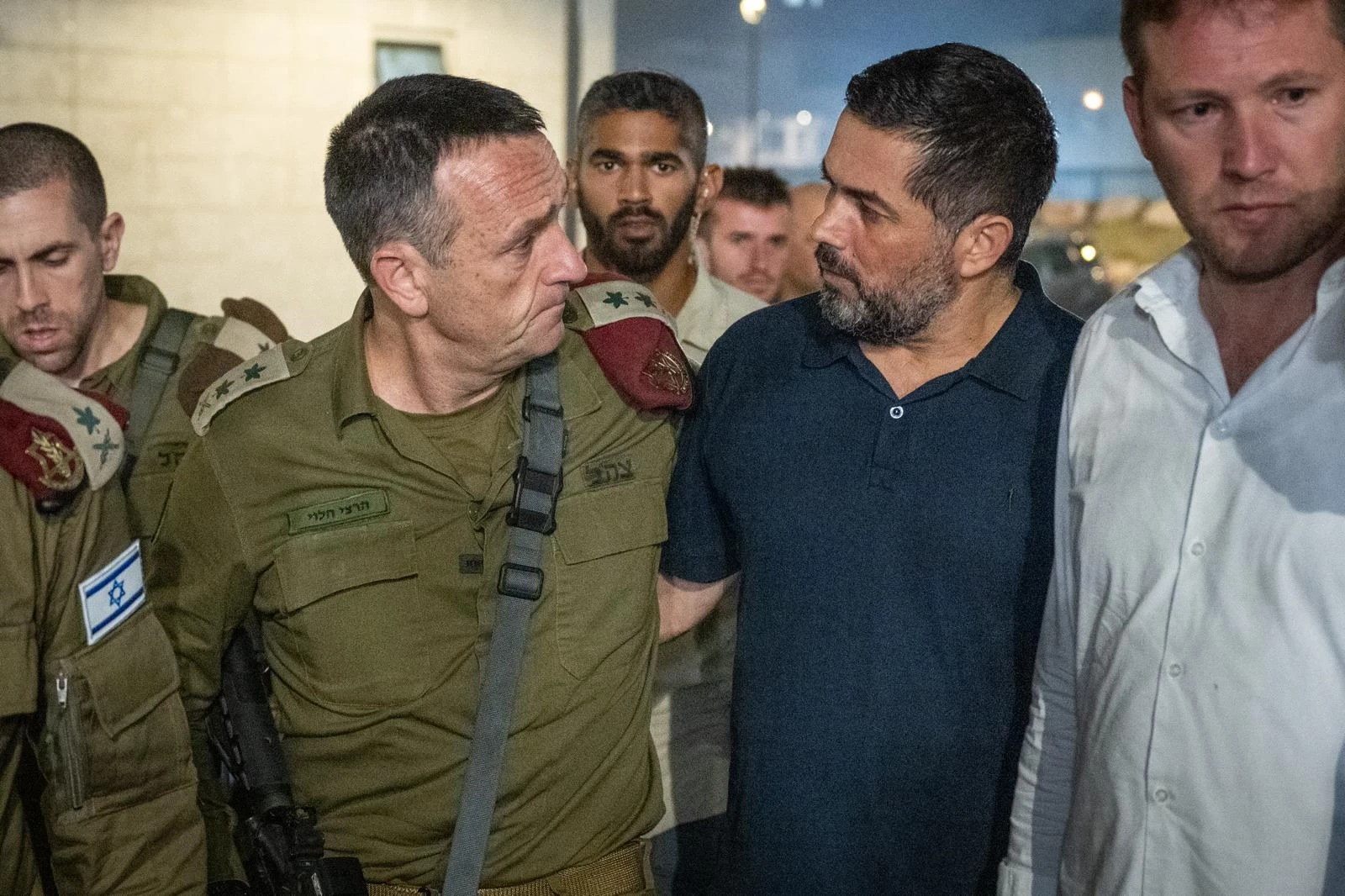
IDF Chief of Staff, Lt. Gen. Herzi Halevi meeting with the Mayor of Majdal Shams, Dolan Abu Saleh, at the site of the attack

Following the attack, Israel's military stated that it had launched strikes against Hezbollah weapon storage and infrastructure in Lebanon, specifically in the areas of Chabriha, Burj el-Shemali, Beqaa, Kafr Kila, Khiam, Rab El Thalathine, and Tayr Harfa. The IDF also said that it struck the launch site of the projectile with artillery.

=== 28 July ===
On 28 July, Lebanon's foreign minister, Abdallah Bou Habib, said that the Lebanese government had requested that the US urge Israel to show restraint, and added that the US had also asked Lebanon to relay a message to Hezbollah to exercise restraint. Hezbollah, reported to be on high alert, preemptively evacuated key sites in southern Lebanon and the Beqaa Valley in anticipation of a possible Israeli response.

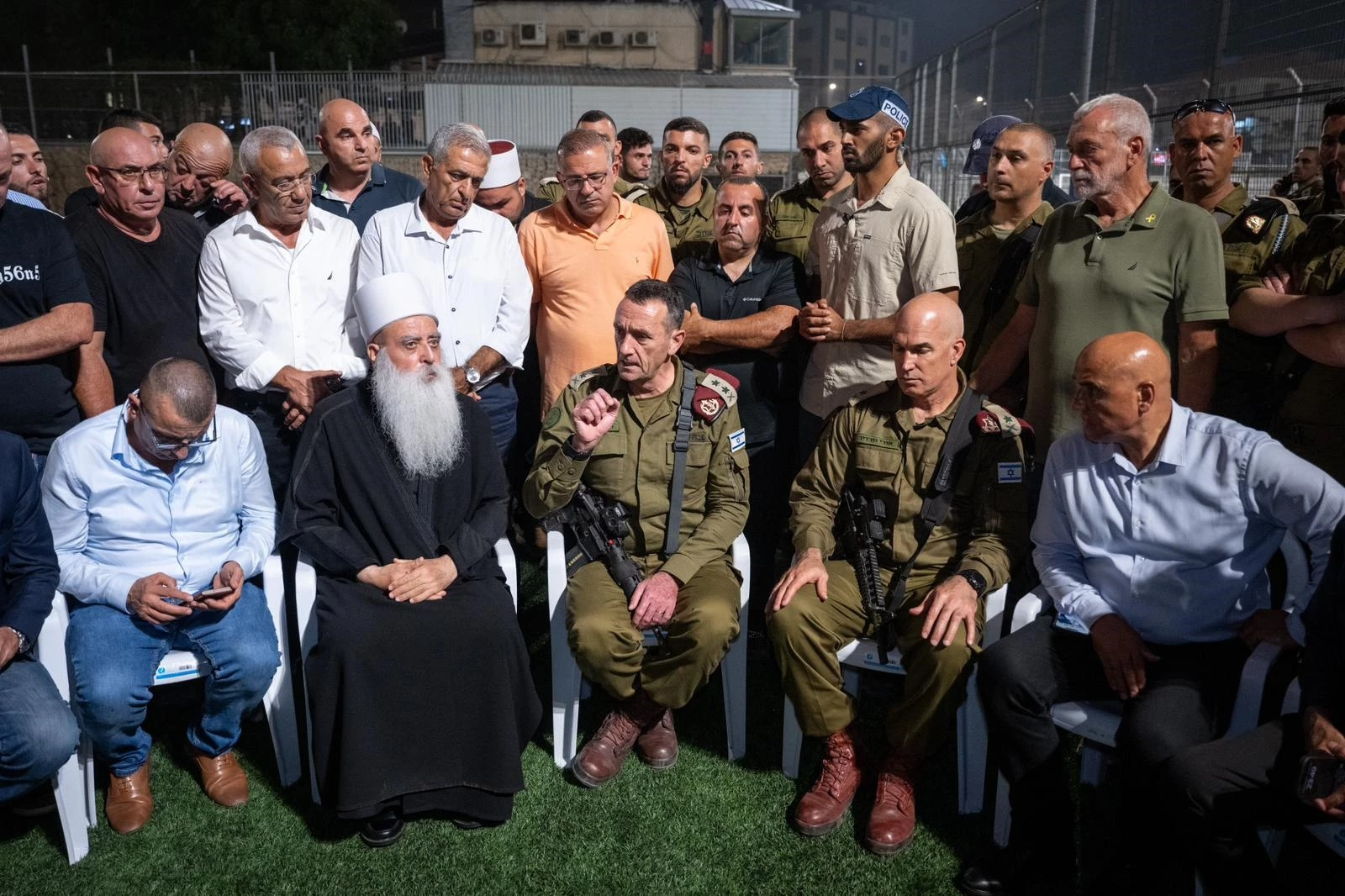
IDF Chief of Staff, Lt. Gen. Herzi Halevi, at the soccer field in Majdal Shams, meeting with Druze community leader Sheikh Mowafaq Tarif, local council representatives, and senior IDF officers

The IDF Chief of Staff, Lieutenant General Herzi Halevi, visited Majdal Shams to assess the situation and discuss with Sheikh Mowafaq Tarif, the leader of the Druze community in Israel.

A spokesman for the Israeli Foreign Ministry said that the situation could be resolved without broader conflict if Hezbollah complied with United Nations Security Council Resolution 1701, which was intended to end the 2006 Lebanon War and required that they withdraw behind the Litani River.

Over 300,000 shekels were raised on Sunday by 2,065 people for families in Majdal Shams who lost children in a rocket attack. Israeli Finance Minister Bezalel Smotrich, who came to visit the site of the attack, was berated by local residents who called him a "criminal" and a "murderer". Some Druze residents of the Golan Heights called on Israel to take decisive action against Hezbollah.

=== 29 July ===
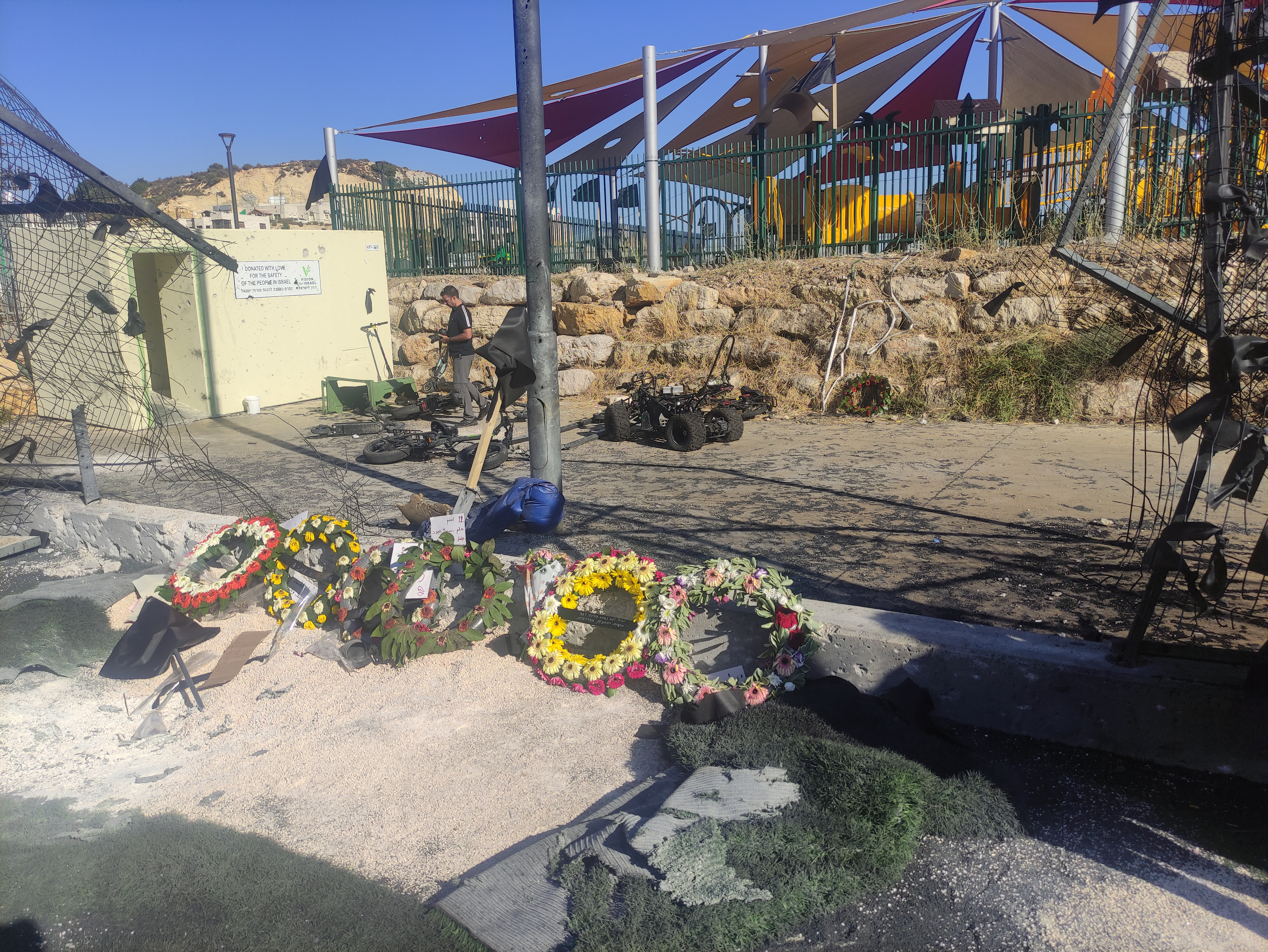
Wreaths left at the site of the attack, 29 July 2024.

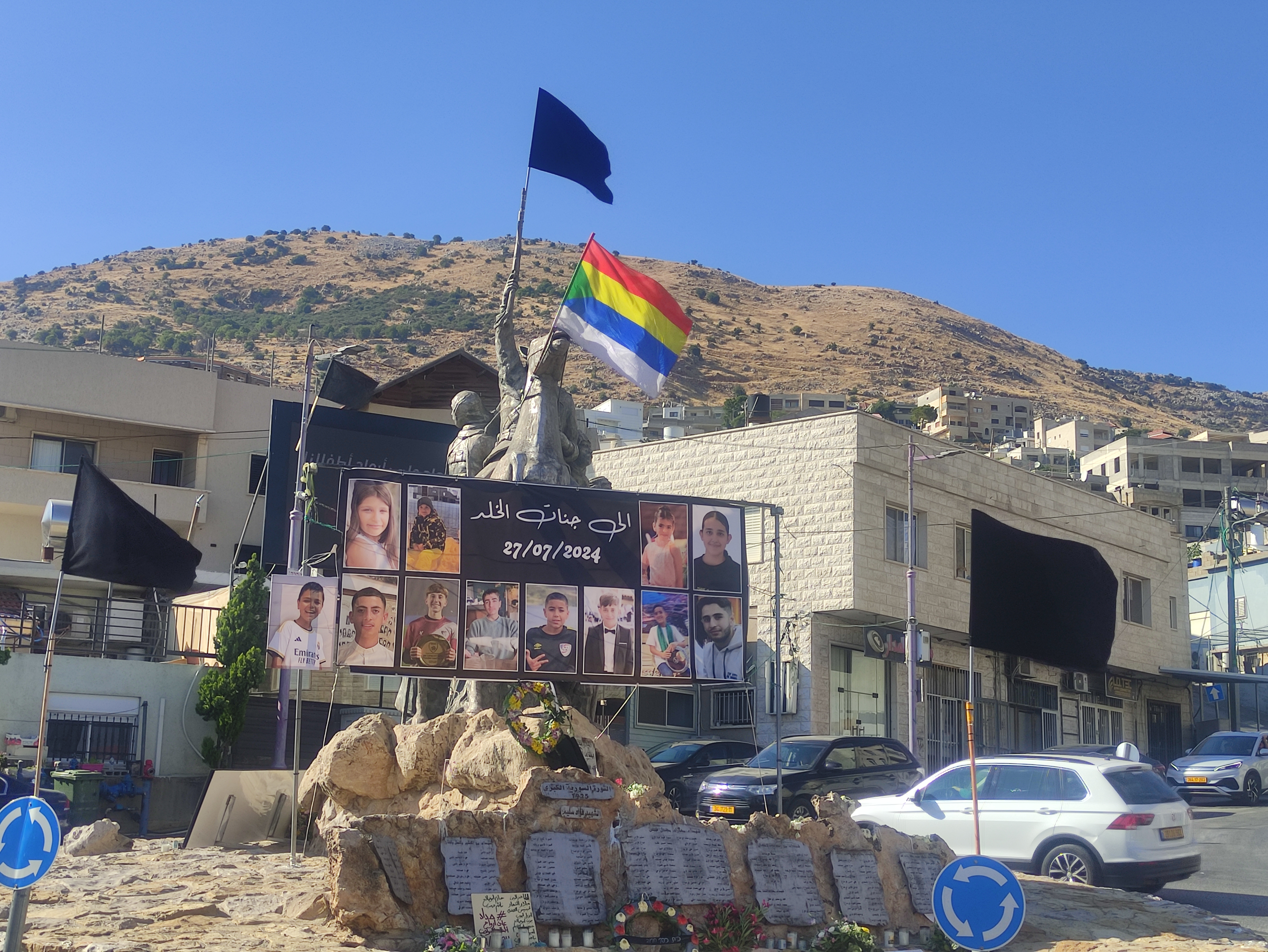
A black flag of mourning, as well as the Druze flag, at the monument in Majdal Shams in honor of Sultan Al-Atrash, along with photos of the victims

On 29 July, local residents issued a statement were they rejected any retaliation.

Israeli authorities confirmed the death of 11-year-old Jivara Ibrahim Ibrahim, the 12th victim of the attack. Ibrahim had been missing for over 24 hours following the attack, and his death was confirmed through DNA testing of evidence from the scene. His family and local residents had been searching for him and providing DNA samples to hospitals.

Flights to and from Beirut–Rafic Hariri International Airport faced significant cancellations and delays. Major airlines, including Air France, Lufthansa, and Swiss, suspended flights due to security concerns. The rocket strike has heightened fears of a broader conflict, as Hezbollah denied responsibility. Beirut airport's operations were further affected by insurance-related issues and increased cross-border hostilities.

Israeli Prime Minister Benjamin Netanyahu visited the site of the attack and was met with 200 protestors yelling "He is the enemy of all of us" and "murderer". Some of the protestors held up signs calling Netanyahu a "war criminal". A viral post titled "All Eyes on Majdal Shams" depicted children in a soccer field through an AI-generated image, similar to the "All Eyes on Rafah" campaign. The image was shared by Israeli Jews and Arabs.

Germany and Norway have advised their citizens to leave Lebanon, while the US and Denmark have reiterated their recommendations against travel to the country.

=== 30 July ===
A Hezbollah rocket attack killed one Israeli citizen in kibbutz HaGoshrim and wounded three more.

On the evening of 30 July Israel retaliated with a UAV strike on Beirut, targeting Fuad Shukr (also known as Al-Hajj Mohsen), a senior adviser to Hezbollah leader Hassan Nasrallah. Israel also killed 3 civilians, including two children, and wounded 80 others in the attack. Shukr was previously named by the IDF as a commander of the group's precision missile project. He was also wanted by the United States for his involvement in the 1983 Beirut barracks bombings.

The Jewish Agency for Israel, Jewish Federations of North America, and Keren Hayesod announced an emergency aid donation of 600,000 NIS to Majdal Shams on 31 July, stating, "We see the Druze community as family."

In the Quneitra Governorate, in southern Syria, a funeral gathering was held for the victims of the attack.

=== Further developments ===
Hezbollah vowed to retaliate for the July 30 assassination of Fuad Shukr. On August 25, Israel partially thwarted what Hezbollah characterized as "the first phase" of the retaliation with a preemptive strike against Hezbollah's launch sites.

On October 2, 2024 Israel killed Khader Shahabiya in an airstrike. Israel claimed that Shahabiya was behind the attack in Majdal Shams as well as other attacks in the Mount Dov region.

In February 2026, the Jerusalem Post reported that the families of the victims filed an 80 million shekel (approximately $25 million) lawsuit against Hezbollah.

== Reactions ==
=== Israel ===
- Israel: President Isaac Herzog condemned the attack as a "terrible and shocking disaster". He described the attack as a brutal act targeting children who were simply playing soccer, stating, "They did not return." Herzog urged the international community to not remain silent against Hezbollah's actions, which he linked to Iranian influence, asserting that Israel would "firmly defend its citizens and its sovereignty."
  - Prime Minister Benjamin Netanyahu spoke by telephone with Sheikh Mowafaq Tarif following the attack, expressing his "deep horror" at the killing of "children and innocents". He emphasized that Israel would retaliate harshly, stating that Hezbollah would "pay a heavy price for this that it has not paid to this point".
  - Foreign Minister Israel Katz declared that the attack had crossed all red lines and warned of a potential full-scale war with Hezbollah and Lebanon. He stated that while the conflict would come at a significant cost, the goal is to decisively defeat Hezbollah and restore peace, and he has directed the Foreign Ministry to prepare a global campaign to support actions in Lebanon.
  - Minister of Energy Eli Cohen said that "Lebanon should burn" after the attack.

=== Lebanon ===
- Lebanon: The government of Lebanon issued a statement urging "immediate cessation of hostilities on all fronts" and condemned attacks on civilians but did not mention Majdal Shams. Lebanese Druze politician Wiam Wahhab said that Druze "blood is not cheap," and called for an independent investigation into the Majdal Shams massacre.
  - Hezbollah: Hezbollah said it had carried out nine attacks using rockets and suicide drones against IDF targets including Maaleh Golani in response to Israeli airstrikes but denied Majdal Shams had been targeted.
  - Druze Member of Parliament, Wael Abu Faour said: "The Israeli occupation state weeps over the children martyrs from the occupied Syrian Golan Heights — this is the height of obscenity and hypocrisy," and "Today, they cry over them to incite discord between them and their Arab and Islamic brethren, while war criminal Netanyahu wants to use the Golan tragedy to overturn any negotiations and continue his aggressive war on the Palestinian people" Faour also compared the victims in Majdal Shams to those killed by Israel in the Gaza Strip.
  - Druze leader of the Lebanese Democratic Party, Talal Arslan, said: "The Golan will not fall into the trap of Israel's project to pretend to protect minorities"
  - Ahmad Qabalan, Lebanon's Grand Ja'fari Mufti, said: "To the Druze brothers in Lebanon, Syria, and Palestine: our blood, spirit, and struggle are unified, and so is our enemy. The tragedy in Majdal Shams is unrelated to the resistance; this is clear. ... The Israeli narrative about the events in Majdal Shams is that of a killer wiping away his crime with tears. The butcher of Gaza and the enemy of humanity is not to be believed. The Zionist goal is to divide us and mask the massacre in Gaza and the suffering of its children and women with crocodile tears. No one has paid the price for liberating the Golan and Palestine as the resistance has."

=== Syria ===
- Syria: The Council of Ministers issued condolences to the people of Majdal Shams and condemned the attack stating: "this crime, is an attempt to fabricate lies and pretexts to expand the circle of aggression against the peoples of the region and to escape the impasse resulting from the resistance that this occupation is facing in the Gaza Strip."
  - The Arab Socialist Ba'ath Party issued a statement: "Through this aggression, Zionist entity tried to mislead world public opinion by accusing Lebanese Hezbollah resistance of committing this act with the aim of igniting sedition". They also condemned Israel for the attack.
  - SANA reported that Syria's Foreign Affairs and Expatriates Minister, Faisal Mekdad "stressed Syria’s legitimate right to recover the occupied Golan, denouncing the heinous crime committed by the occupation forces on Saturday in Majdal Shams town." He also asked for the United Nations to intervene against Israels actions against Syrians in the Golan Heights.

=== Druze communities ===
The attack provoked widespread outrage among Druze in Israel, Lebanon and Syria.

==== Golan Heights ====
The Druze community in the Golan Heights sent a letter to the Israeli government asking that no government ministers attend the funeral. The funeral was kept non-political, with no national flags, and a Druze resident stated "Many Druze feel angry and do not want to be fuel in this war for any side". A local paramedic stated "for sure, it was not targeting Majdal Shams. There are many Israeli military bases around the town. I expect this threat was heading their way".

In Majdal Shams, some residents urged immediate and severe retaliation from Israeli authorities, and called for decisive action against Hezbollah. Other reports stated the local Druze rejected retaliation and Israel's attempt to politicize the tragedy.

The people of Majdals Shams issued a statements where they said: "The Golan rejects any official incitement and the attempt to exploit the name of Majdal Shams as a political platform at the expense of our children’s blood," - "We reject the shedding of a single drop of blood under the pretext of avenging our children."

==== Israel ====
Sheikh Mowafaq Tarif, the spiritual leader of the Druze community in Israel, condemned the attack, stating: "We are in great shock from the horrific massacre in the Druze village, an atrocious and murderous terrorist attack that struck innocent children playing soccer. The sight of the children's shattered bodies strewn across the grass is indescribable." He further stated, "a civilized country cannot allow the continuous harm to its citizens and residents."

==== Lebanon ====
Lebanese Druze leader Walid Jumblatt slammed Israeli "lies" and "crocodile tears over the Druze Arabs". He also issued condolences to the affected families and "to the entire population of the occupied Syrian Golan."

Some Lebanese Druze activists condemned the Majdal Shams massacre, expressing profound grief and intensifying their opposition to Hezbollah. They criticized political leaders for perceived alliances with the group and stressed the need for unity among Druze communities across the region.

==== Syria ====
20 people protested in Syrian Druze city of as-Suwayda against Hezbollah, shouting: "Listen, motherland. May God bless our people in the occupied Golan. We can afford to be silent when children sleep quietly, but when they die in a treacherous bombing delivered by the party of the devil, we must raise our voices against the gang that rules here."

=== Worldwide ===
==== Governments ====
- Argentina: The Ministry of Foreign Affairs stated strong condemnation for "the cowardly attack by Hezbollah" and solidarity with Israel and support for Israel's right to legitimate defense; while pointing the 30th anniversary of the AMIA bombing in Argentina which was also reportedly perpetrated by Hezbollah, to once again reiterate its strongest condemnation of all forms of terrorism.
- Canada: Foreign Minister Mélanie Joly condemned the attack and offered condolences to the victims' families and the Druze community. She also worried about an escalation in the conflict between Israel and Hezbollah and demanded that Iran and its proxies avoid further destabilizing the region. Joly released a statement on X holding Hezbollah responsible for the attack.
- European Union: High Representative of the Union for Foreign Affairs and Security Policy Josep Borrell said: "I strongly condemn this bloodbath. We need an independent international investigation into this unacceptable incident. We urge all parties to exercise utmost restraint and avoid further escalation." He also described "shocking images from the soccer field in the Druze town of Majdal Shams."
- United Kingdom: Foreign Secretary David Lammy condemned the attack, expressed concern about an escalation of the conflict and called on Hezbollah to cease its attacks.
- United States: The US condemned the attack and reaffirmed its support for Israel against Hezbollah. It also voiced concerns that it could spark an escalation of the Israel–Hezbollah conflict. Secretary of State Antony Blinken said: "Every indication is that indeed the rocket was from Hezbollah. We stand by Israel's right to defend its citizens from terrorist attacks."

==== Media ====
Gideon Levy, writing for Haaretz, criticized the lack of shock in Israeli media and the IDF over the deaths of thousands of children in Gaza since 7 October. He highlighted the quick labeling of children killed in Majdal Shams as "murdered Israelis", even though not all were Israeli citizens, contrasting it with the silence over Gaza's casualties.

According to an analysis by The Jerusalem Post, Hezbollah and Lebanese officials are attempting to distance themselves from responsibility for the Majdal Shams massacre, despite growing evidence linking Hezbollah to the attack. Lebanese authorities and Hezbollah representatives have issued denials and spread misinformation to avoid backlash, with claims ranging from blaming Israeli anti-rocket interceptors to outright rejecting involvement. These actions are aimed at preventing further conflict and mitigating the negative impact on Hezbollah's image, particularly in light of the group's history of targeting civilians and the potential for unrest among the Druze community in Lebanon and Syria.

== Later events ==
Two years after the attack, volunteers from Birthright Israel built eight therapeutic gardens for the residents of Majdal Shams. At the gardens' dedication, Dolan Abu Saleh, the mayor of Majdal Shams, said in his remarks that following the October 7 attacks, the Golan Druze had realized that their security was tied to that of Israel, and that on October 8, they "accepted the Jews and Israelis as our home". Abu Saleh further added that the construction of the gardens meant that "the Jews finally accepted us".

== See also ==
- Nabatieh attack
- Nabatieh Fawka attack
