= Mansouri attack =

1996 Israeli attack

- Part of Operation Grapes of Wrath
- Abbas Jiha, holding one of his killed daughters
- Location: 33.1784°N 35.2055°E; Mansouri, Southern Lebanon
- Date: 13 April 1996; 13:40 (UTC+03:00)
- Attack type: Airstrike
- Deaths: 6
- Injuries: 4
- Perpetrator: Israel Defence Forces

The Mansouri attack occurred on 13 April 1996, when an Israel Defence Forces helicopter attacked an ambulance in Mansouri, a village in Southern Lebanon, killing two women and four children.

== Attack ==
At 1:30 PM, Abbas Jiha, a farmer and volunteer ambulance driver, was driving a Volvo vehicle, with the word "ambulance" written in red. He was taking wounded people as well as four of his children to Sidon. A United States-made Israeli Apache helicopter followed the car and fired two missiles at it. The attack killed 6 civilians out of the 13 passengers who were escaping the village. The children ages ranged from 7 months to 9 years.

== Aftermath ==
Although Israeli officials admitted that the vehicle was targeted, Major General Moshe Ya'alon claimed that it was "used by fighters to flee", but an investigation by Amnesty International found no connection between any of the victims to Hezbollah. Robert Fisk said that Israel broke the Geneva Conventions, which protect civilians even if they were around "armed antagonists". B'Tselem called it a "blatant violation of the laws of war".

== See also ==
- Qana massacre
- Nabatieh Fawka attack
- Operation Grapes of Wrath
