= Human rights in Syria =

Crime in Syria
- Homicide: 2.1 (2010)
- Assault: 0.7 (2018)
- Burglary: 8.5 (2018)
- Theft: 16.6 (2018)
- Fraud: 3.6 (2018)
- Corruption: 0.1 (2018)
- Rape: 0.1 (2018)
- Sexual violence: 0.3 (2018)
- reported per 100,000 inhabitants

There has been a varying nature of human rights under various governments that ruled Syria since the French colonial rule in Syria starting in the 1920s.

== History of human rights ==
=== French rule (1920–1946) ===
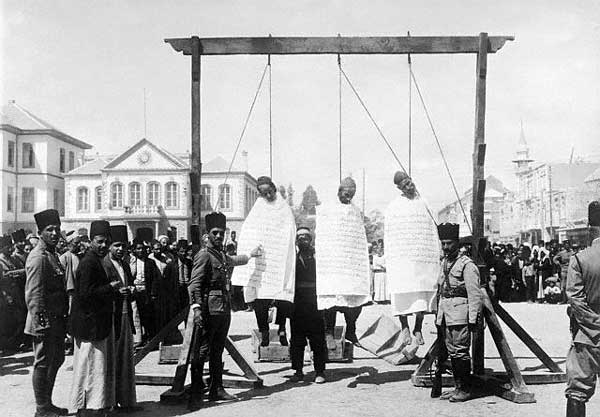
Three Syrian rebels hanged in Marjeh Square during Syrian Revolt of 1925–1927

From the early 1920s until 1946, Syria and Lebanon were under the control of a French Mandate, officially ratified by the League of Nations on 29 September 1923. Human rights concerns during this period included the colonialist treatment of the Druze within their autonomous state in the southern portion of the mandate, as prisoners and peasants there were often used for forced labor.

During the Great Revolt, French military forces sieged much of Damascus and the countryside, killing at least 7,000 rebels and displacing over 100,000 civilians. Authorities would publicly display mutilated corpses in central squares within Damascus and villages throughout Syria as a means of intimidating opponents of the government. In 1926, the Damascus military court executed 355 Syrians without any legal representation. Hundreds of Syrians were sentenced to death in absentia, prison terms of various lengths, and life imprisonment with hard labour.

Additionally, it was during this period that Syrian Women's Rights groups began to assert themselves, led by individuals like Naziq al-Abid.

=== Post–1948 ===
Jews in Syria have been discriminated against, especially since the establishment of the State of Israel in 1948. In 1948, Jews were banned from leaving the country and from selling their property. In 1953, all Jewish bank accounts were frozen and Jewish property confiscated. In 1954, Jews were temporarily permitted to emigrate, but they had to leave all their property to the government

=== Ba'athist era (1963–2024) ===
The coup d'etat in 1963 staged by the Military Committee of the Syrian Ba'ath party overthrew the Second Syrian Republic headed by President Nazim al-Qudsi, ushering in decades-long Baathist rule. The new regime implemented social engineering policies such as large-scale confiscation of properties, state directed re-distribution of lands and wealth, massive censorship, elimination of independent publishing centres, nationalization of banks, education system and industries. A state of emergency was declared which abolished all other political parties and bestowed sweeping powers upon the military; effectively ruling the country as police state. Purges were carried out throughout the civil society, bureaucracy; and the army was packed with party loyalists. Syrian Ba'athists were highly influenced by Akram Hawrani's Arab Socialist party which adhered to Marxism.

In March 1964, Jews were banned from traveling more than 5 kilometres (3 mi) from their hometowns. Jews were not allowed to work for the government or banks, could not acquire drivers' licenses, and were banned from purchasing property. Although Jews were prohibited from leaving the country, they were sometimes allowed to travel abroad for commercial or medical reasons. Any Jew granted clearance to leave the country had to leave behind a bond of $300–$1,000 and family members to be used as hostages to ensure they returned. An airport road was paved over the Jewish cemetery in Damascus, and Jewish schools were closed and handed over to Muslims. The Jewish Quarter of Damascus was under constant surveillance by the secret police, who were present at synagogue services, weddings, bar mitzvahs, and other Jewish gatherings. The secret police closely monitored contact between Syrian Jews and foreigners and kept a file on every member of the Jewish community. Jews also had their phones tapped and their mail read by the secret police. After Israel's victory in the 1967 Six-Day War, restrictions were further tightened, and 57 Jews in Qamishli may have been killed in a pogrom. The communities of Damascus, Aleppo, and Qamishli were under house arrest for eight months following the war. Many Jewish workers were laid off following the Six-Day War.

After purging rival Baathist factions through a coup in 1970, General Hafez al-Assad established total dominance over the Ba'ath party and established a dictatorship centred around his personality cult. The structure of Assad's police state revolved around the Ba'ath party organization, Syrian military establishment packed with Ba'athist elites and Assad family's Alawite loyalists. Hafez ruled Syria for three decades, deploying repressive measures ranging from censorship to violent methods of state terror such as mass murders, deportations and practices such as torture, which were unleashed collectively upon the civilian population. SS-Haupsturmfuhrer Alois Brunner, who played a significant role in the implementation of the Holocaust as the right-hand man of Adolf Eichmann, assisted al-Assad in organizing the Ba'athist secret police and trained them on Nazi Germany's torture practices. Such practices remained in use by 2021.

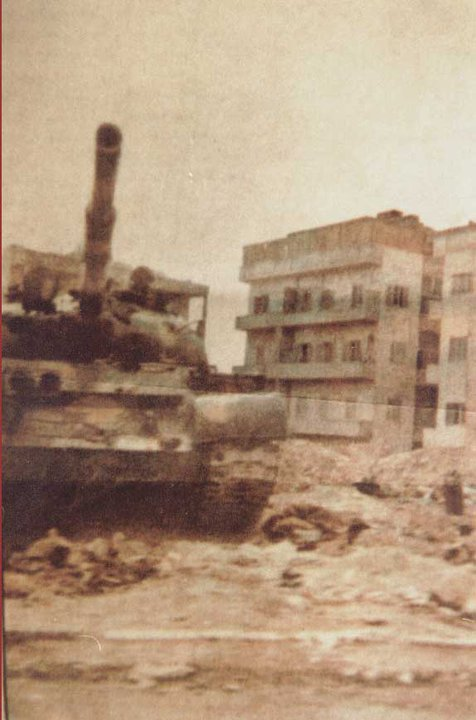
A Syrian army tank rolls over the ruins of the city suburbs shortly after the 1982 Hama massacre, which killed an estimated 40,000 civilians

In 1982, Hafez al-Assad responded to an insurrection led by the Muslim Brotherhood in the city of Hama by sending a paramilitary force that indiscriminately killed between 10,000 and 55,000 civilians including children, women, and the elderly during the Hama massacre. State-violence perpetrated by Assad's reign have targeted women extensively, subjecting them to discrimination and gender-based violence. Between 1980 and 2000, more than 17,000 Syrian civilians were subjected to forced disappearance from the Syrian regime. During Baathist occupation of Lebanon, numerous Lebanese, Palestinian and other Arab civilians went missing. More than 35 torture techniques were reported to be employed in Syrian prisons and military detention centres during this time. A 1983 report published by Amnesty International revealed that Assad regime routinely committed mass-executions of alleged dissidents and engaged in the extensive torture of prisoners of conscience. Various torture methods in Syrian prisons include electrocutions, setting on fire, sexual violence, castration, etc.

In 2000, Bashar al-Assad inherited the totalitarian system of Ba'athist Syria following the death of his father. His regime was characterized by even more systemic violence and repression than that of Hafez al-Assad. This has been widely attributed to Bashar's inexperience in security and political affairs, in addition to personal insecurities regarding the survival of his family regime. 2006 Freedom House report listed Syria amongst the worst countries to restrict civil liberties and political freedoms; giving it the lowest possible scores in both measures. In 2023, Freedom House rated people's access to political rights in Syria as the lowest on its Freedom in the World annual report on 210 countries. Syria ranked "-3" in political rights – lower than its scale of 1 to 7, alongside South Sudan and Western Sahara – and Syria was given a rating of "Not Free." Since 2022, Syria has the lowest ranked country in report.

According to the 2008 report on human rights by the U.S. State Department, the Syrian government's "respect for human rights worsened". Members of the security forces arrested and detained individuals without providing just cause, often held prisoners in "lengthy pretrial and incommunicado detention", and "tortured and physically abused prisoners and detainees". The government imposed significant restrictions on freedom of speech, press, assembly, and association, amid an atmosphere of government corruption. According to Arab Press Network, "despite a generally repressive political climate", there were "signs of positive change," during the 2007 elections. According to a 2008 report by Reporters without Borders, "Journalists have to tightly censor themselves for fear of being thrown into Adra Prison."

In 2009 Syria was included in Freedom House's "Worst of the Worst" section and given a rating of 7 for Political Rights: and 6 for Civil Liberties. According to Human Rights Watch, as of 2009 Syria's poor human rights situation had "deteriorated further". Authorities arrested political and human rights activists, censored websites, detained bloggers, and imposed travel bans. Syria's multiple security agencies continue to detain people without arrest warrants. No political parties were licensed and emergency rule, imposed in 1963, remained in effect. Various torture techniques deployed in Syrian detention centres and prisons include routine beatings, rapes, sexual violence, "Bisat al-rih" (flying carpet), etc.

The scale of the brutal violence and state terrorism unleashed by the Assad regime and his foreign backers across the country after the eruption of the 2011 Syrian revolution was unprecedented, far outstripping the actions of other Arab autocrats who repressed the Arab Spring. It even exceeded the brutal violence unleashed by Hafez al-Assad during the Hama Massacre. By pursuing scorched-earth policies to crush the armed resistance, Bashar had destroyed the majority of Syria's civilian, cultural and economic infrastructure. Unlike his father, Bashar killed far more Syrian civilians and has also lost significant amount of his political independence to foreign actors like Russia and Iran.

In April 2017, the U.S. Navy carried out a missile attack against a Syrian air base which had been used to conduct a chemical weapons attack on Syrian civilians. This attack is also known as the 2017 Shayrat missile strike. In 2018, coalition forces including United States, France, and the United Kingdom also carried out a series of military strikes in Syria.

=== Post-Assad (2024–present) ===
2025 VOA report about fears among Syrian minorities

In March 2025, following the fall of the Assad regime, pro-government fighters aligned with the provisional government massacred thousands of Alawites and Christians in sectarian violence that has been described as ethnic cleansing. According to the Syrian Observatory for Human Rights, more than 2,000 Alawites, including women, children, and the elderly, were summarily executed in March, and many thousands more were forced to flee their homes. While the majority of these executions have taken place along the Mediterranean coast, there are reports of Alawite civilians being murdered in Damascus, just a few kilometers from the Presidential Palace. Despite Syrian president Ahmed al-Sharaa's denial of complicity and repeated promises to investigate and punish those responsible, regional experts and some Western governments have argued that the new Sunni Islamist government is responsible for the jihadist groups and voiced increasing concerns that Assad's autocracy is being replaced by a Sunni theocracy intolerant of minorities.

Reports say that about 3,700 children are still missing in Syria after 14 years of Assad’s rule, according to verified records from the Syrian Network for Human Rights. Rights groups believe the real number may be much higher, possibly over 10,000. Many of these children were taken during raids, mass arrests, or separated from their detained parents. Some reports claim that western charity organizations actually worked with the old regime, helping them kidnap children.

In November 2025, the Office of the United Nations High Commissioner for Human Rights said "nearly 100 people in Syria have been abducted or forcibly disappeared since January".

== Human rights in the Democratic Autonomous Administration of North and East Syria ==
Human rights violations against Kurds included depriving ethnic Kurdish citizens of their citizenship; suppressing Kurdish language and culture; discrimination against citizens based on Kurdish ethnicity; confiscation of Kurdish land and settlement by Arabs. In the course of the Syrian Civil War, parts of North and East Syria gained de facto autonomy within the Kurdish-led Democratic Autonomous Administration of North and East Syria.

In a 2015 report "'We Had Nowhere Else to Go': Forced Displacement and Demolition in Northern Syria", Amnesty International documented allegations of forced evictions of Arabs, Turkmens and Kurds and the destruction of their homes. According to Amnesty International, People's Defense Units (YPG) accused them of having links with ISIL and other Islamist groups. The report said that "in some cases, entire villages have been demolished", and that villagers were "ordered to leave at gunpoint, their livestock shot at". Some persons claimed to Amnesty that "they told us we had to leave or they would tell the United States coalition that we were terrorists and their planes would hit us and our families. Threats by the YPG of calling in US airstrikes against villagers were reported. Amnesty International claimed that "these instances of forced displacement constitute war crimes". Some Arab and Turkmen claimed that YPG militias have stolen their homes and livestock, burned their personal documents and claimed the land as theirs, and that Turkmen "are losing lands where they have been living for centuries". During the Syrian civil war, several attacks by Arab or Kurdish Muslims have targeted Syrian Christians, including the 2015 Qamishli bombings. In January 2016, YPG militias conducted a surprise attack on Assyrian checkpoints in Qamishli, in a predominantly Assyrian area, killing one Assyrian and wounding three others.

In October 2015, Amnesty International reported that the YPG had driven civilians from northern Syria and destroyed their homes in retaliation for perceived links to ISIL. The majority of the destroyed homes belonged to Arabs, but some belonged to Turkmens and Kurds. Turkish "Daily Sabah" claimed that Amnesty International has said that Kurdish PYD conducted ethnic cleansing against Turkmens and Arabs after seizing Tal Abyad. However, Amnesty International has published only one report about the Syrian Kurdish forces and it is related to destroying villages and homes, not ethnic cleansing at all. The Amnesty International report concluded that there are documented cases of forced displacement that constitute war crimes. In 2015, Assyrian and Armenian organizations protested the enforcement of Kurdish self-administration in the Hasaka province, including expropriation of private property by the PYD and interference in church school curricula and also criticized illegal seizure of property, and targeted killings Assyrians have also criticized the enforcement of revisionist curricula in private and public schools with a Kurdish-nationalist bias. They have claimed that in textbooks the Kurds "alter historical and geographical facts", including Assyrian place names which are changed to Kurdish names, and students are taught that King Nebuchadnezzar from the Old Testament married a Kurdish woman. Of particular concern are the "harassment and arbitrary arrests of the PYD's Kurdish political rivals" and of civil society leaders noted by human rights organizations. The Y.P.G. is accused of having arrested hundreds of political prisoners. It is claimed that about 150 people were abducted by the YPG in 2013 alone. Human Rights Watch reported in 2014 that "there have been numerous cases of maltreatment in prisons in Rojava". Some dissidents were tortured and killed Amnesty International reported in 2015 that the PYD "is using a crackdown against terrorism...as a pretext to unlawfully detain and unfairly try peaceful critics and civilians." The PYD has also shot demonstrators, arrested political opponents, and shut down media outlets. Ethnic tensions between Kurds and Arabs have been at the forefront of the conflicts in Syria and Iraq. In Syria, there are widespread reports of Kurdish abuses against Arab civilians, including arbitrary arrests, forced displacement, and reports of YPG forces razing villages. Similar reports of Kurdish forces destroying Arab homes have emerged in the fight for Mosul.

== See also ==
- Al-Marsad
- Caesar Syria Civilian Protection Act
- Human rights in Muslim-majority countries
- Human rights in the Middle East
- Human trafficking in Syria
- List of massacres in Syria
- Wissam Tarif
- Abduction of Syrian children and the role of Western charity organizations

== References and footnotes ==
- – Syria profile
