= TootArd =

Musical group from the Golan Heights

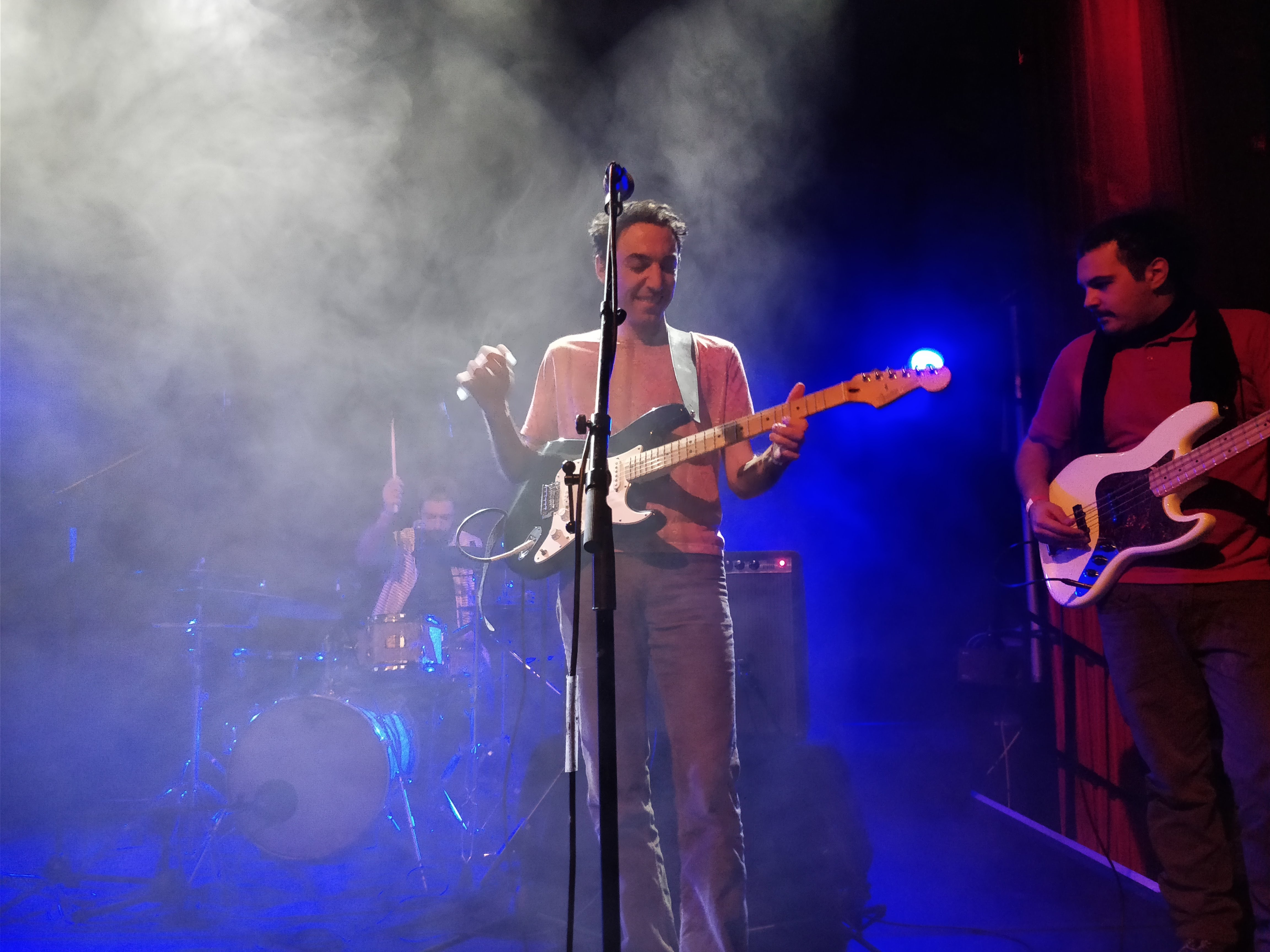
- Performing at Rich Mix London (February, 2018)

Background information
- Origin: Majdal Shams, Golan Heights
- Genres: Psychedelic rock, Tuareg music, reggae, Arabic rock, disco
- Years active: 2010–present
- Members: Hasan Nakhleh (voice, guitar); Rami Nakhleh (bass, drums); Amr Mdah (saxophone)
- Website: tootard.com

TootArd (Arabic: توت أرض, Earth Berries) is a Syrian Arabic rock band from Majdal Shams in the Golan Heights, now based in Bern and Haifa. The band was founded by brothers Hasan and Rami Nakhleh. To date, the band has released three albums: Nuri Andaburi (2011), Laissez Passer (2017), and Migrant Birds (2020).

== History ==
=== Background ===
TootArd, Arabic for "Earth Berries", was formed in 2010 by brothers Hasan and Rami Nakhleh. All band members grew up in Majdal Shams. The band started by performing in the Golan Heights, later travelling to Jerusalem and Europe.

=== Nuri Andaburi (2011) ===
In 2011, TootArd released their first international album Nuri Andaburi. Many of the songs in this album depict the present political situation that the band members grew up in. Some of the songs are more idealistic and imagine a time when humans were more tolerant towards each other and "closer to Nature".

=== Laissez Passer (2017) ===
In 2017, TootArd released their second international album Laissez Passer. The album addresses the statelessness of the Druze people of the northern Golan Heights. Laissez Passer, French for "Let Them Pass", refers to the document that Golan Heights inhabitants hold and use to move around.

=== Migrant Birds (2020) ===
In 2020, TootArd released their 3rd international album Migrant Birds. Like Laissez Passer, the album touches on themes regarding the inhabitants of the Golan Heights.

== Musical style ==
The band's style is mixed. Their first album, Nuri Andaburi, is heavily inspired by reggae music. Their second album, Laissez Passer, combines Tuareg style with psychedelic rock. In their 3rd album Migrant Birds, a disco sound is utilized, incorporating quarter-tone synth leads into their album. This is achieved with a Yamaha PSR-62 Oriental Model. In general, the band refers to their style as "mountain rock reggae", in reference to their limestone mountainside hometown.

== See also ==
- Music of Syria
