= Shouting Hill =

Hill in the Golan Heights

Coordinates: 33°16′09″N 35°46′56″E

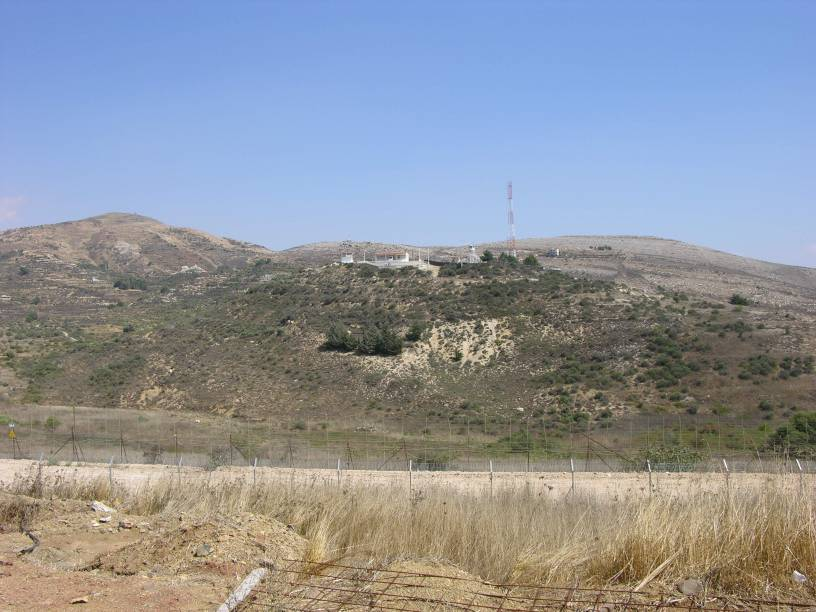
Shouting Hill seen from Majdal Shams, at a distance of 400 m

Shouting Hill is a hill in the Golan Heights. The hill is located near the Druze village of Majdal Shams, in the area of the Golan that is occupied by Israel. During the Six-Day War, Israel captured most of the Golan Heights. Shouting Hill is located close to the Purple Line, a ceasefire line that separates Syrian and Israeli controlled territory.

Following the war, the Druze community in the Golan Heights was separated by the ceasefire line. Very few visits are allowed between families on either side of the ceasefire line, as Israel and Syria are still in an official state of war and no telecommunications or mail are allowed across the border. This is what led some families to come to this hill to see and communicate with their relatives on the other side. Because of the distance, the families had to shout their messages through megaphones.

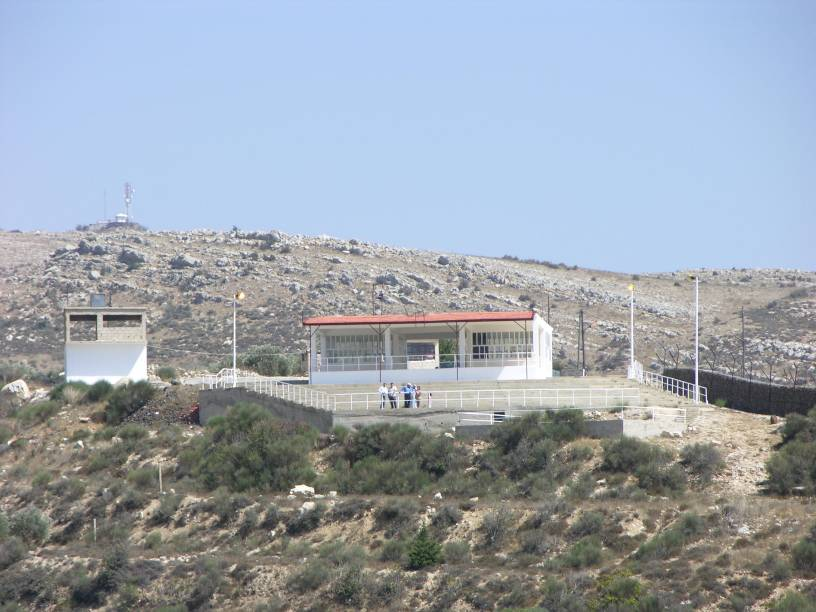
People waiting on the Syrian controlled side for their relatives in Majdal Shams

With the advent of mobile phones, this practice has declined, except on special occasions like weddings when families particularly feel the need to physically see each other.

The hill is located at the foot of Mount Hermon and is separated from the village of Majdal Shams by a valley. On the Israeli-occupied side, there is a security zone that stretches over the valley next to the village. On the Syrian controlled side, there is a UN observation post which at 1100 meters altitude. The shouting point is 3 km away from the nearest homes of Majdal Shams and 2.5 km away from the border line.
