= Mona Khalil =

Lebanese environmentalist (1949–2026)

- منى خليل
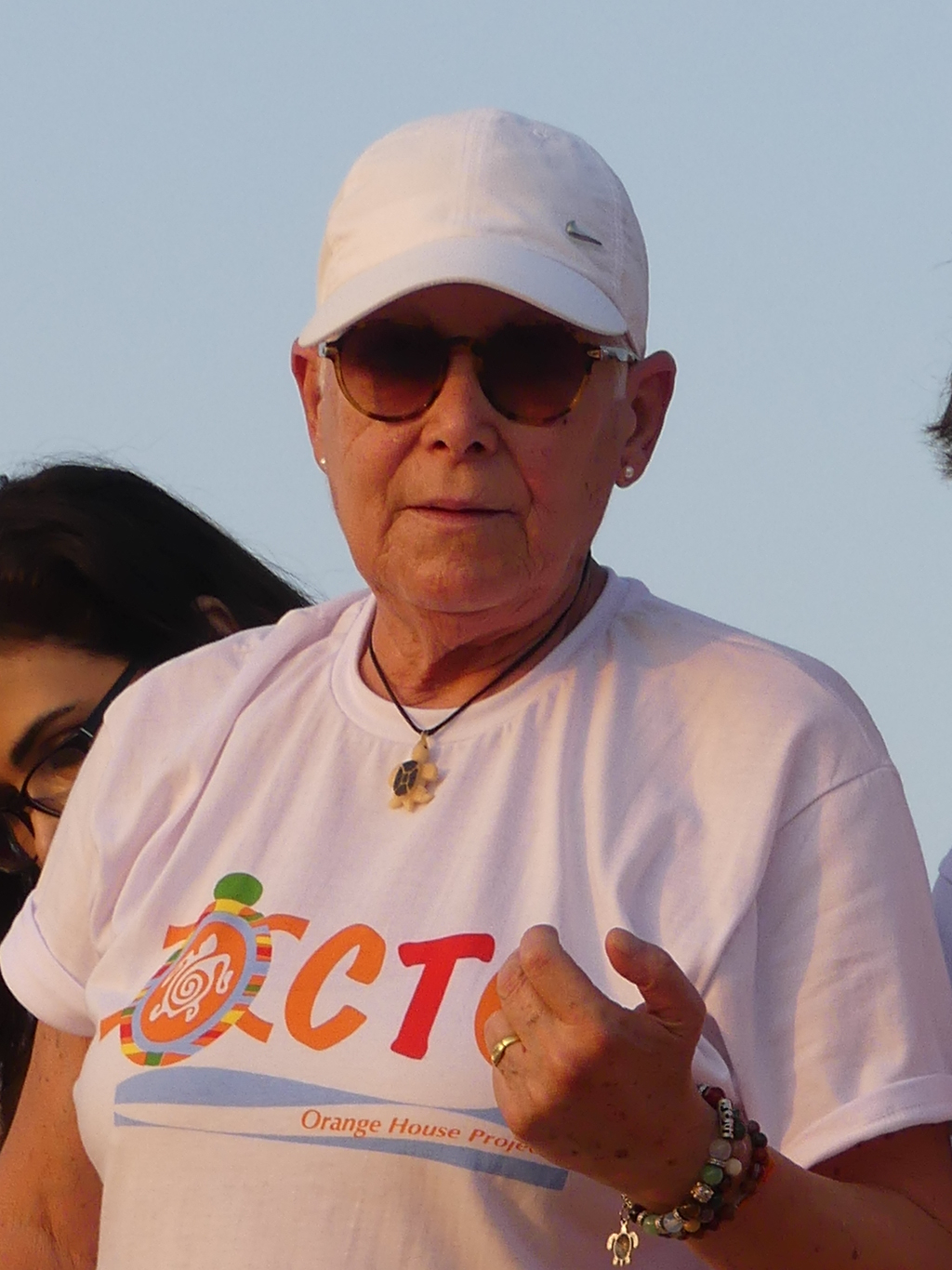
- Khalil in 2019
- Born: 2 August 1949; Lagos, British Nigeria
- Died: 19 June 2026 (aged 76); Beirut, Lebanon
- Cause of death: Injuries sustained after her house was bombed by Israeli forces on 5 June 2026
- Education: Beirut Evangelical School for Girls

Mona al-Khalil (2 August 1949 – 19 June 2026), commonly known as Mona Khalil (Arabic: منى خليل), was a Lebanese conservationist, environmentalist and biologist who specialised in the protection of endangered sea turtles. Khalil was seriously injured in a June 2026 Israeli attack in the southern part of the country during the 2026 Lebanon war, and died of her wounds two weeks later.

== Early life ==
Khalil was born to a Lebanese family in 1949 in Lagos, Nigeria. As a child, she attended school in Beirut and visited the beach in Southern Lebanon during the summer. Khalil lived in the Netherlands for more than 10 years, including several years during the Lebanese Civil War, and was employed by a museum to restore porcelain. Her son drowned when he was 8 years old after being hit by a speed boat while snorkeling.

== Environmental activism ==
In 1999, Khalil travelled to Lebanon. She stayed in her family home in Al-Mansouri which her grandfather had built in the 1970s and which she had inherited from him. The house was close to Tyre and Naqoura and an area occupied by the Israeli army. While walking on the nearby beach, she saw a sea turtle laying eggs in the sand. She found out that turtles were endangered in Lebanon and resolved to help protect them.

In early 2000, Khalil moved from the Netherlands to Al-Mansouri. The family house had not been lived in since the 1980s because of the civil war and had fallen into disrepair. Khalil spent several years restoring and cleaning it up. With her partner Habiba Fayed, she opened a bed-and-breakfast there to finance environmentalist efforts through ecotourism. They painted the facades orange and called it the "Orange House", because the colour is associated with the Netherlands.

Over three years, Khalil and Fayed were trained by scientists from the Athens-based NGO Mediterranean Association to Save the Sea Turtles (MEDASSET) to establish a monitoring programme, collect data and protect the turtles' nests. Specifically they sought to protect the local loggerhead and green sea turtles. According to Khalil, local residents had avoided the beach during the Israeli occupation. After the Israeli military withdrew in 2000, locals returned to the area and disturbed the turtles by leaving trash, stealing eggs, and using harmful fishing practices. Khalil recounted being threatened and shot at by local fishermen who opposed her conservation efforts, but after several years they left her alone and stopped using dynamite for fishing. Khalil also asked local UN peacekeepers to stop throwing trash in the water.

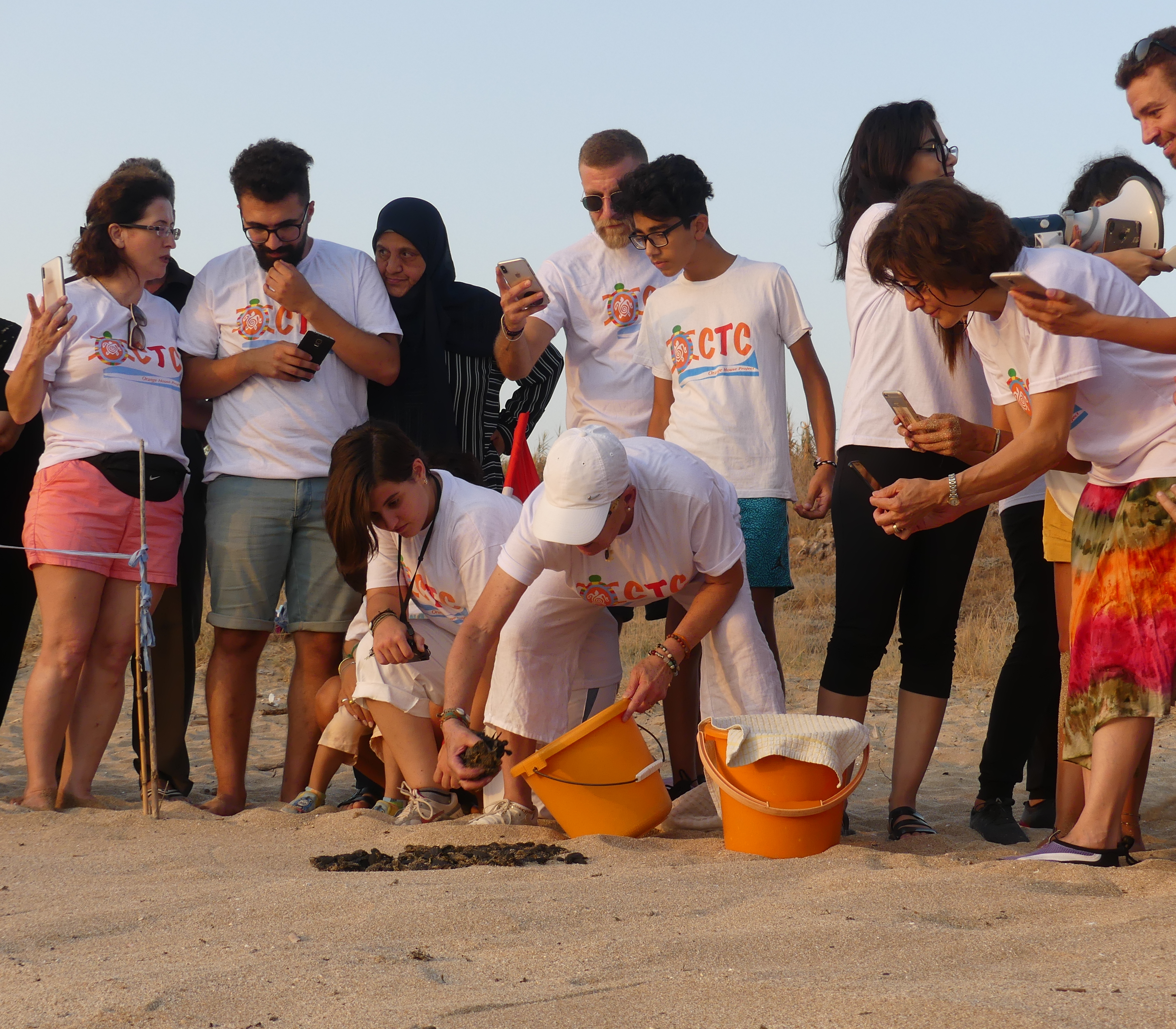
Khalil on Mansouri beach in southern Lebanon, releasing turtle hatchlings into the sea, August 2019

The Orange House's busiest season for visitors was from May to October, during turtle nesting season. Guests cleaned the beach, protected the eggs from predators, and watched turtles hatching. In 2013, Khalil told The Daily Star that: "People come because here it's a very private place. It's a place that nobody is going to judge them, so long as they respect the nature. Homosexuals, lesbians, whatever – nobody will judge them here."

During the 2006 Lebanon War, Khalil and Fayed initially stayed in their home because it was hatching season. Eventually they left for Beirut to escape the fighting. While they were gone, an Israeli strike damaged part of their home. According to Khalil and Fayed, it was the best season since the start of the project, because the fighting kept people away from the beach. Eventually, the local Hezbollah-run government protected the area as Hima Qoleileh–Mansouri.

Khalil also campaigned against development in the area, seeking to preserve the area for the sea turtles. When the COVID-19 pandemic left the beach of Mansouri deserted and the adjacent luxury resort closed, Khalil and her team saw a record number of 20 nests of the endangered green sea turtles.

After Khalil retired in 2022, her turtle conservation efforts were continued by volunteers whom she had mentored. Their work was hindered by Israeli airstrikes on the beach during the 2024 Israel–Lebanon ceasefire.

== Death ==
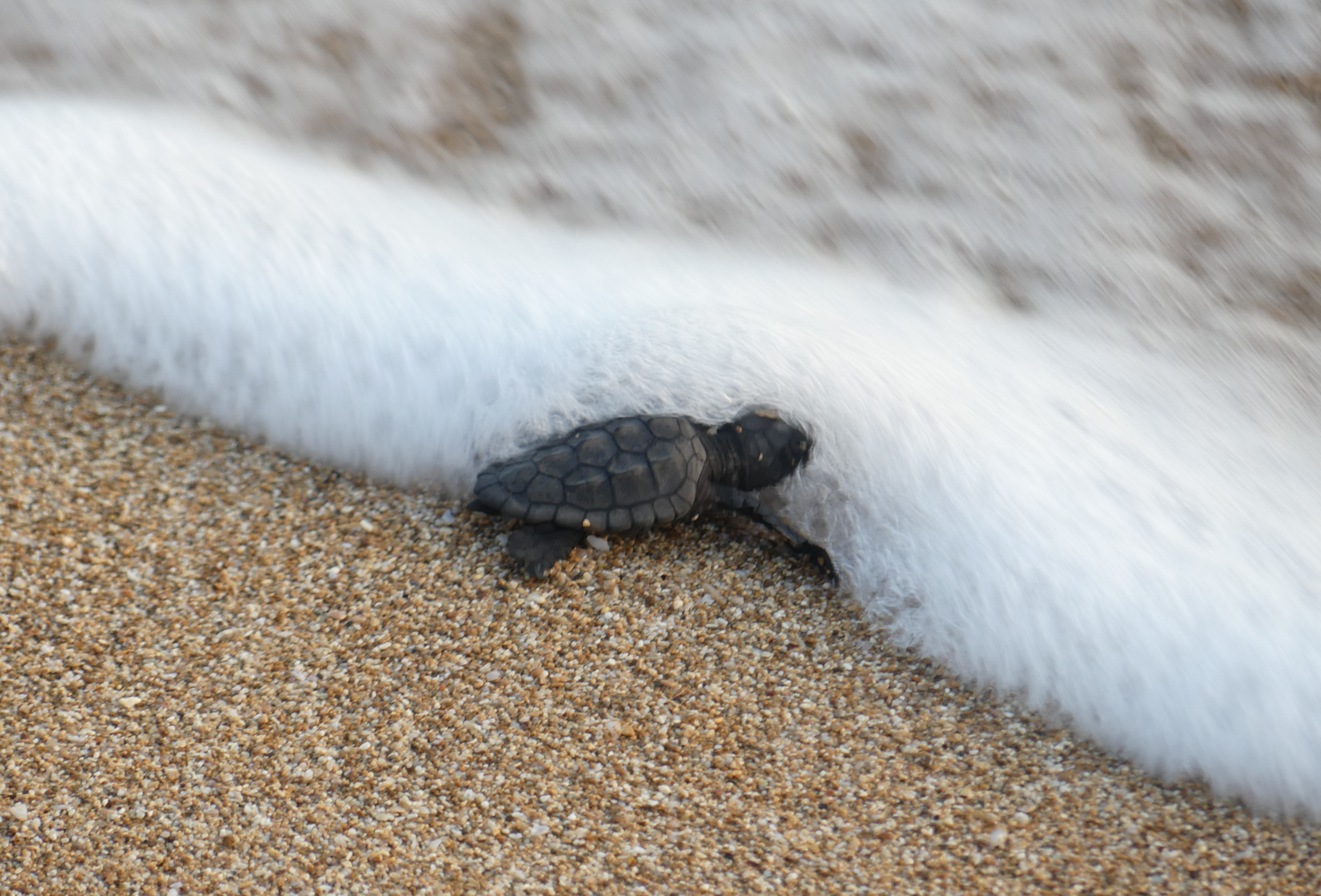
Sea turtle hatchling released into the Mediterranean Sea by conservationists Mona Khalil and Habiba Fayed

During the 2024 Lebanon War, Khalil regretted evacuating her home for Beirut. During the 2026 Lebanon war, she decided not to leave her home. As of June 2026, Mansouri was one of about 70 villages heavily damaged by the Israel military in the 2026 Lebanon war.

On 5 June 2026, Khalil was seriously injured by Israeli airstrikes on her Mansouri home. Her assistant, Hawa, was injured with second degree burns and ran to get help from the Lebanese army. Both were treated at Jabal Amel Hospital and underwent several surgeries, after which their condition initially stabilized. Local environmental group, Green Southerners, alleged that the attack on Khalil's home was part of a pattern of Israeli attacks on environmentalists and attempts to forcibly displace residents.

Khalil was later transferred to the American University of Beirut Medical Center for further treatment. She died as a result of her wounds two weeks later, on 19 June. The next day, a memorial service was held in Beirut.

=== Reactions ===
The Israel Defense Forces said that she "was not a target," adding that "there is no known IDF strike in which she was injured" but that strikes were carried out in the area around the village "after the IDF issued evacuation warnings."

Her death was mourned by local environmentalists, including Live Love Beirut, Terre Liban, Society for the Protection of Nature in Lebanon, and Green Southerners. Green Southerners also condemned her killing as "a stark reminder of the devastating toll that Israeli attacks continue to exact on civilians, environmental defenders, and the natural heritage they sought to protect." Khalil's niece called on her turtle conservation efforts to continue and for Khalil's killing to be investigated, stating that she was "not a soldier, not a fighter, but a 76-year-old woman, a conservationist and eco-warrior who spent her life protecting sea turtles".

== Research publications ==
- Newbury, Nic; Khalil, Mona; Venizelos, Lily (2002). "Population status and conservation of marine turtles at El-Mansouri, Lebanon". Zoology in the Middle East. 27: 47–60. doi:10.1080/09397140.2002.10637940.
- "Complex Population Structure of the Endangered Loggerhead Sea Turtle (Caretta Caretta) in the Mediterranean Sea Revealed by Nuclear and Mitochondrial DNA Markers" (PDF). 26th Annual Symposium on Sea Turtle Biology and Conservation, Island of Crete, Greece, 3–8 April 2006: 183.
