= Dolan Abu Saleh =

Israeli Arab politician

- دولان أبو صالح
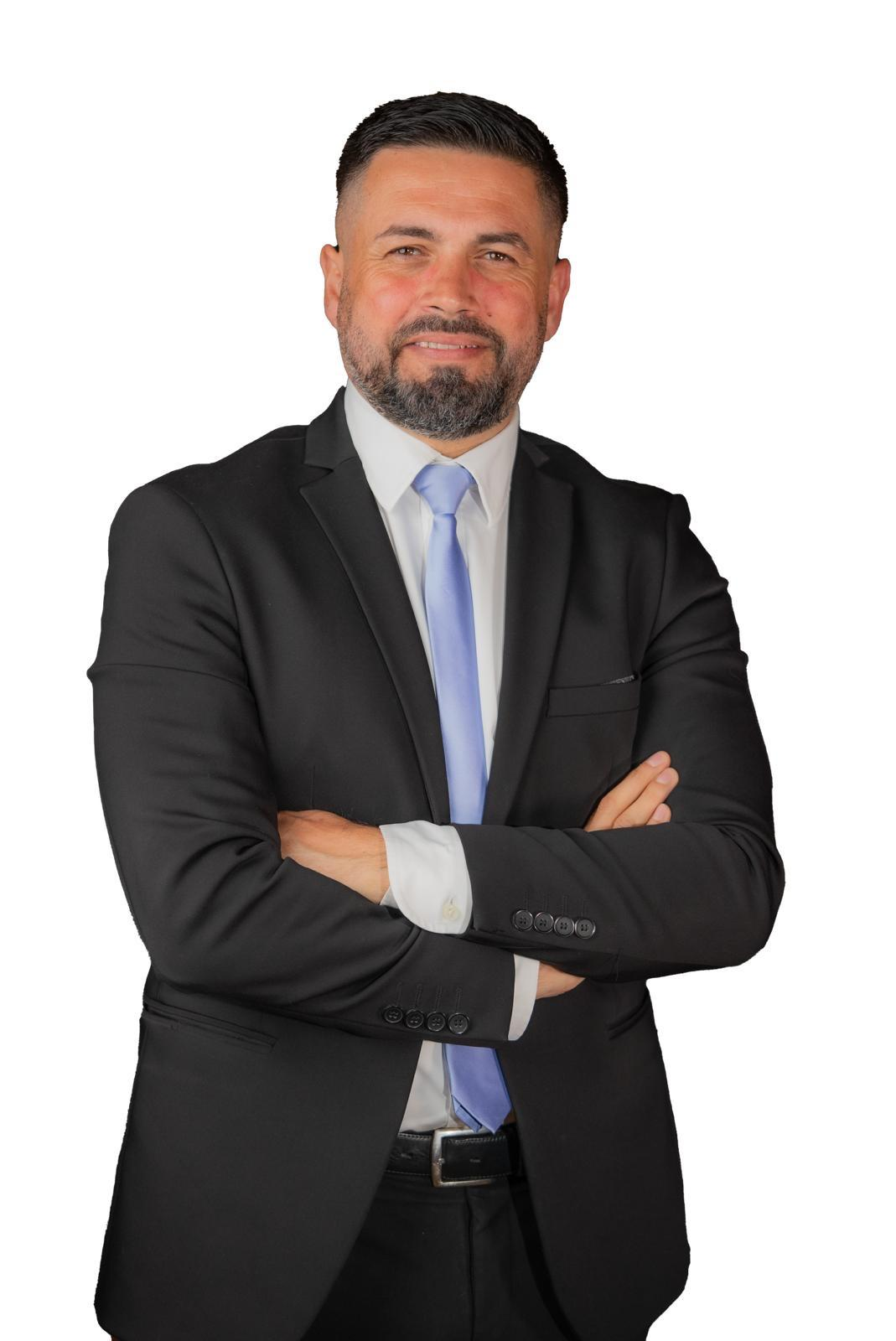
- Abu Saleh, 2023

Mayor of Majdal Shams
- Incumbent
- Assumed office 2018

Personal details
- Born: Dolan Abu Saleh; 28 February 1978 (age 48) Majdal Shams
- Children: 4
- Education: Bachelor of Human Services, Tel Hai University

Dolan Abu Saleh (Arabic: دولان أبو صالح, Hebrew: דולאן אבו סאלח; born 28 February 1978) is a Golan Heights politician who has served as the head of the Majdal Shams Council since 2018. Abu Saleh is the first head of the council to be elected in democratic elections.

== Early life ==
Abu Saleh was born and raised in Majdal Shams, the eldest of four children born to Yousef and Sabah. He attended elementary and middle school in Majdal Shams, and high school in the village of Buq'ata. After high school, he worked as a teacher at an elementary school. From 1999 to 2006, he served as an employee of the Welfare Bureau in the Majdal Shams Council as a welfare attorney. From 2006 to 2008, he engaged in mediation and volunteering at a society for nursing services.

== Political career ==
In July 2008, he was appointed by Interior Minister Meir Sheetrit as head of the designated council and served in that position until January 2018. He then left that position and entered a cooling-off period in order to run in the elections. After members of the Druze community filed a petition with the Supreme Court, the Interior Ministry decided to hold municipal elections.

Coinciding with the 2018 Israeli municipal elections, council elections were held for the first time in Majdal Shams. Most residents of Majdal Shams boycotted the election in which Abu Saleh was elected, and the voter turnout in the election was 277 votes, or 3.39 percent. Abu Saleh received 260 of the 272 votes for the presidency of the council (95.6 percent of the vote). His list "Majdalna" won 254 votes and all 11 seats on the council.

In the 2024 election, Abu Saleh was elected to another term as head of the council, with 57.85 percent of the vote. He defeated the three candidates who ran against him: Dia Abu Saleh, Salim Kahaluni, and Dia Safadi. His "Majdalna" faction won six seats in the council's plenary session.

In an August 2024 interview, a week after 12 children and young adults were killed in a direct hit of a missile in Majdal Shams, Abu Saleh said that terrorists needs to be taken out worldwide, but also called for an end to the fighting, noting that the residents of Majdal Shams support a negotiated agreement that would provide security and stability to people living in northern Israel. According to Reuters and the Associated Press, the rocket that struck Majdal Shams was identified as an Iranian-made Falaq-1, a type of rocket used by Hezbollah. Hezbollah denied responsibility for the strike, saying that it had fired a Falaq rocket at an Israeli military base north of Majdal Shams that day.

In 2026, Abu Saleh spoke at the dedication of eight therapeutic gardens that volunteers from Birthright Israel had built for the residents of Majdal Shams, to help them mourn the victims of the Majdal Shams attack two years prior. At the gardens' dedication, Abu Saleh said in his remarks that following the October 7 attacks, the Golan Druze had realized that their security was tied to that of Israel, and that on October 8, they "accepted the Jews and Israelis as our home". Abu Saleh further added that the construction of the gardens meant that "the Jews finally accepted us".

== Personal life ==
Abu Saleh holds a bachelor's degree in human services and multidisciplinary studies from Tel Hai University. He is married with four children, and lives in Majdal Shams.
