= Nabatieh al-Fawqa =

Nabatieh al-Fawqa النبطية الفوقا Upper Nabatieh
- Municipality
- Location within Lebanon
- Coordinates: 33°21′22″N 35°29′44″E
- Grid position: 127/158 L
- Country: Lebanon
- Governorate: Nabatieh Governorate
- District: Nabatieh
- Time zone: GMT +3

Nabatieh al-Fawqa (Arabic: النبطية الفوقا, romanized: an-Nabaṭiyya al-Fawqā), also known as Upper Nabatieh, is a municipality in the Nabatieh Governorate.

== History ==
In the 1596 tax records in the early Ottoman era, the village was named in the nahiya (subdistrict) of Sagif under the liwa' (district) of Safad. It had a population of 104 households and 25 bachelors, all Muslim. The villagers paid 2,200 akçe in taxes on olive trees, 450 for "occasional revenues", 602 on goats and bee hives, 30 for an olive oil press, or a press for grape syrup, and 5000 as a fixed amount; a total of 8,276 akçe.

In 1875, Victor Guérin described the village as being located on a hill, and having 500 Métualis inhabitants. It was surrounded by gardens planted with fig trees.

On 16 April 1996, Israeli warplanes bombed an apartment in Nabatieh al-Fawqa, killing nine people, seven of whom were children.

== Demographics ==
In 2014 Muslims made up 98.60% of registered voters in Nabatieh al-Fawqa. 90.76% of the voters were Shiite Muslims.

== Bibliography ==
- Guérin, V. (1880). Description Géographique Historique et Archéologique de la Palestine (in French). Vol. 3: Galilee, pt. 2. Paris: L'Imprimerie Nationale.
- Hütteroth, W.-D.; Abdulfattah, K. (1977). Historical Geography of Palestine, Transjordan and Southern Syria in the Late 16th Century. Erlanger Geographische Arbeiten, Sonderband 5. Erlangen, Germany: Vorstand der Fränkischen Geographischen Gesellschaft. ISBN 3-920405-41-2.
- Rhode, H. (1979). Administration and Population of the Sancak of Safed in the Sixteenth Century (PhD). Columbia University. Archived from the original on 2019-04-20.
