= Majdal Shams =

Druze town in the northern Golan Heights

Majdal Shams مجدل شمس (Arabic)
- Town
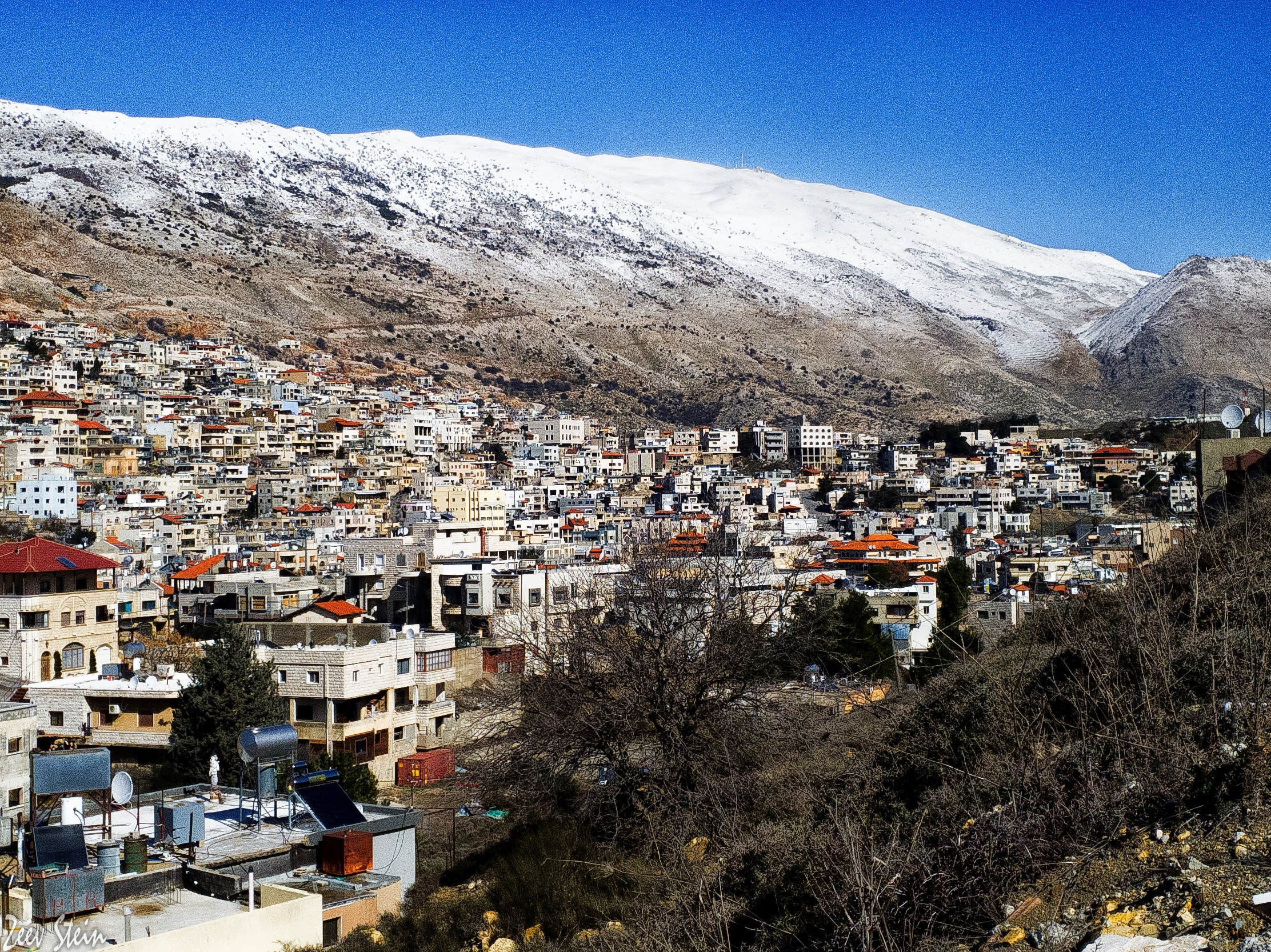
- View of Majdal Shams

- Location within the Golan Heights Location within Syria Location within the Golan Heights
- Coordinates: 33°16′N 35°46′E
- Grid position: 221/296 PAL
- Country: Golan Heights (Internationally recognized as Syrian territory, occupied by Israel.)
- Israeli District: Northern
- Israeli Subdistrict: Golan
- Natural Region: Hermon
- Syrian Governorate: Quneitra
- Syrian District: Quneitra
- Syrian Subdistrict: Quneitra
- Founded: 1500–1700 CE

Government
  - Head of Municipality: Dolan Abu Saleh
- Elevation: 1,130 m (3,710 ft)

Population (2024)
  - Total: 11,264

Ethnicity
  - Jews and others: 0.1%
  - Arabs: 99.9%
- Time zone: UTC+2 (IST)
  - Summer (DST): UTC+3 (IDT)
- Name meaning: Tower of sun
- Website: majdal.co.il

Majdal Shams (Arabic: مجدل شمس; Hebrew: מג'דל שמס) is a Druze town in the Golan Heights region, Quneitra Governorate, Syria. Under Israeli occupation since 1967, it is located in the southern foothills of Mount Hermon. In 2024 it had a population of 11,264.

Majdal Shams played a significant role in the Great Syrian Revolt of 1925–1927 that was led by Druze leader Sultan al-Atrash, who is commemorated by several monuments in the city. Beginning in the 1930s, Majdal Shams became involved in political developments in nearby Mandatory Palestine, and supported the Arab Palestinians during the 1948 Arab–Israeli War.

Since the Six-Day War in 1967, Majdal Shams along with the broader Golan Heights have been under Israeli occupation, and were effectively annexed in 1981. The move was recognized by the United States in 2019, after having been lobbied by Israeli officials.

Majdal Shams is the largest of the four remaining Syrian Druze communities in the Israeli-occupied territories of Golan Heights, the other three being Ein Qiniyye, Mas'ade, and Buq'ata. While the Golan Heights and Mount Hermon are administratively joined, they differ geologically and geographically, with their boundary being marked by the Sa'ar Stream; Majdal Shams and Ein Qiniyye sit on limestone on the Hermon side, while Buq'ata and Mas'ade are on the Golan side, which is characterized by black volcanic rock (i.e., basalt).

== Etymology ==
The name originates from Aramaic, meaning 'tower of sun' in reference (possibly) to the town's elevation. Another hypothesis suggests that the town was originally called Majdal al-Sham (Majdal of Damascus) to distinguish it from the towns of similar names, like Majdal Zoun and Majdal Salem in Lebanon, al-Majdal on the Mediterranean coast and al-Majdal on the Sea of Galilee.

== History ==
=== Ottoman Syria ===
The presence of Druze around Mount Hermon is documented since the founding of the Druze religion in the beginning of the 11th century. According to one version, Majdal Shams was established in 1595 by Druze warlord Fakhr-al-Din II, in order to strengthen Druze presence in the Hermon mount. Another version says that the Druze families began to settle on the southern slopes of Mount Hermon in the early 18th century. By the late 19th century, Majdal Shams was an important regional center and home of the local Ottoman administrator (Mudir). In times of strife, residents of the surrounding villages travelled to Majdal Shams for safety because of the village's elevation and proximity to a major water source at Lake Ram. During the winter of 1895, for example, Druze residents of neighboring communities sheltered in Majdal Shams during a local conflict between irregular Druze and Circassian militias.

The Swiss traveler Burckhardt visited Majdal Shams in 1810. He described the village, which he called Medjel, as situated on a small plain high up in the mountains, with a population of Druzes and four or five Christian families. W. M. Thomson reported that in 1846, the large village "Mejdel es Shems, [was] inhabited by Druses, a fierce, warlike race, sufficiently numerous to keep the Bedawîn Arabs at a respectful distance." In 1870, missionaries associated with the Reformed Presbyterian Church of North America opened a school and church in the town. The mission school operated until 1885, when it was closed by Turkish authorities. Majdal Shams also attracted foreign geologists such as William Libbey because of the town's proximity to an exposed strata of Jurassic period fossils. Fossils excavated at Majdal Shams were acquired by the American University of Beirut and Harvard University.

In 1838, Eli Smith noted Majdal Shams's population as Druze and Christians.

Some travelers wrote vivid descriptions of Majdal Shams. Herbert Rix visited the town around 1907, and commented that "The whole place swarms with children, and many of them are so pretty that the traveller is at first greatly attracted to them." James Kean, who wrote about the town in the 1890s, described Majdal Shams as a "remarkable village" and noted that it was "famous for the manufacture of steel blades." Workshops in Majdal Shams continued to make souvenir daggers for European tourists until the 1950s.

=== French Mandate for Syria and independent Syria ===
==== 1925 Great Syrian Revolt ====
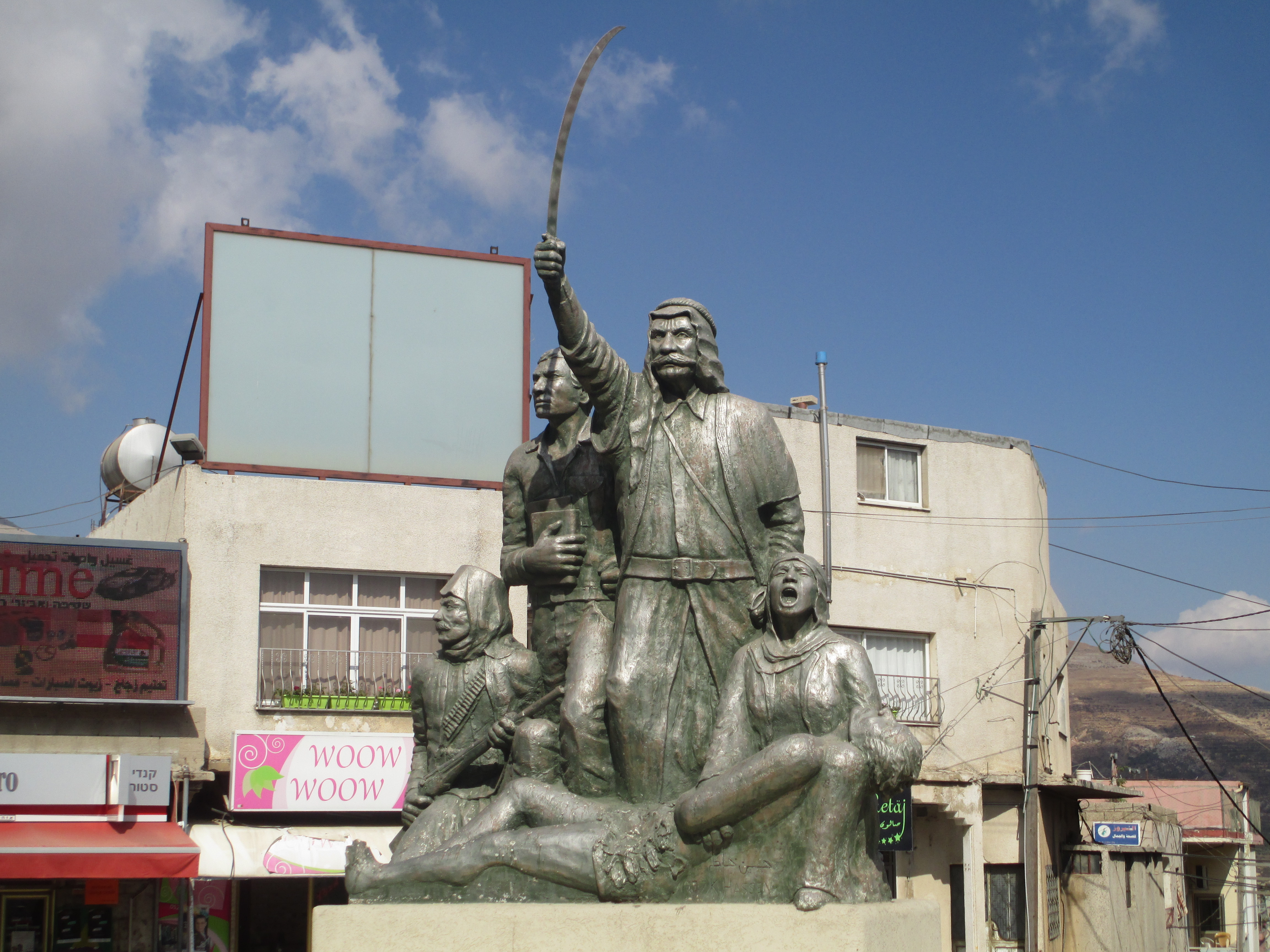
Monument of Sultan Al-Atrash in a central Majdal Shams square; the Druze leader who led the Great Syrian Revolt against the French forces

Majdal Shams played a significant role in the Great Syrian Revolt of 1925–1927. In October 1925, a few months after Syrian Druze had begun fighting French forces in the nearby province of Jabal al-Druze, a group of the town's Druze residents looted local Christian property. Mandate authorities sent troops to restore order, and community leaders contacted the central command of the revolt for assistance defending the town against the French. In response, rebel leader Zaid al-Atrash (brother of Sultan al-Atrash) led a force of 1,000 men to Majdal Shams. Zaid al-Atrash drove French troops from the area and established a rebel garrison in Majdal Shams to guard the road between Damascus and Marjayoun. The garrison housed up to 10,000 rebels until April 1926, when French forces launched a renewed attack on the town. During the assault, French soldiers destroyed much of Majdal Shams and killed approximately 80 residents of the town.

==== 1928–1945 ====
Beginning in the 1930s, Majdal Shams residents and community leaders became involved in political developments in nearby Mandatory Palestine. During the 1936–1939 Arab revolt in Palestine, traditional leader Assad Kanj Abu Salah proposed forming a local militia to assist the rebels. The plan did not come to fruition; according to conflicting accounts, the militia never formed, or engaged in only a single symbolic attack on the Syria-Palestine border.

==== Syrian state (1945–1967) ====
During the 1948 Arab–Israeli War, Abu Salah's son Sultan formed a militia of 300 local men. The militia offered to serve as paid mercenaries for Jewish forces, but later volunteered with Palestinian and Arab forces.

Majdal Shams was integrated into economic networks that extended into both other parts of Syria, and Lebanon. The town traded local grapes for olives grown in Fiq, 50 kilometers to the south. Men from Majdal Shams harvested cedar wood in Lebanon, which they manufactured into plows and sold in Suwayda. In the 1950s, some local residents travelled to Lebanon to work in construction.

Residents of Majdal Shams received access to Syrian state services. By the 1960s, there was a public elementary school in Majdal Shams. Residents attended the regional high school and registered marriages at the court in Quneitra. These institutions served to integrate the community into the broader region and state.

=== Israeli occupation ===
==== 1967–1999 ====
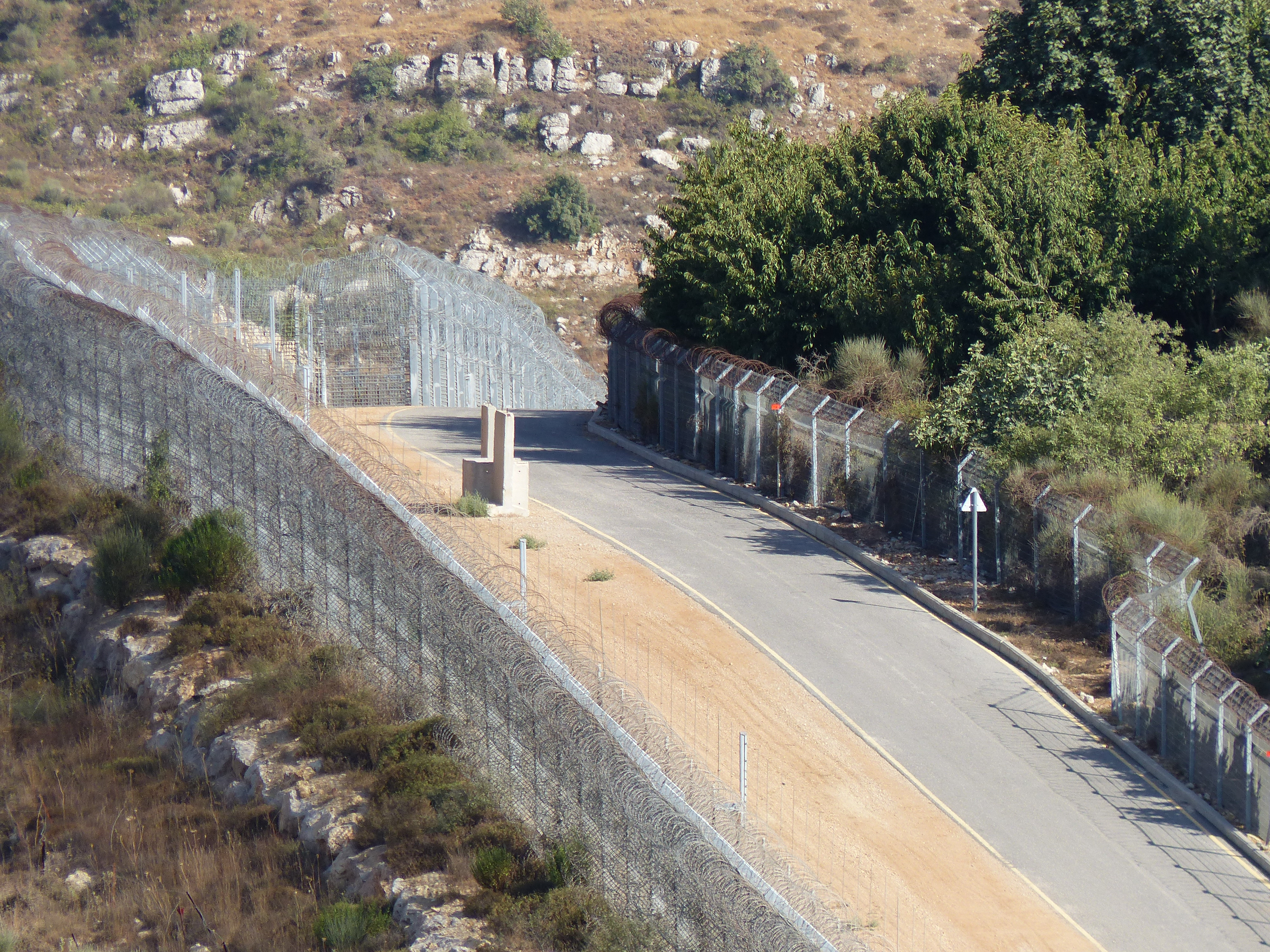
The barrier between the Israeli-occupied portion of the Golan Heights and Syrian territory

Since the Six-Day War in June 1967, Majdal Shams has been under Israeli occupation. During the 1967 Six Day War, residents of the nearby towns of 'Ayn Fit, Banias, Jubata ez-Zeit, and Za'ura took shelter in Majdal Shams. After Israeli forces had secured the area, soldiers forced refugees across the ceasefire line into Syrian-controlled territory, but permitted residents of Majdal Shams and a few other communities to remain in their homes. As Israel and Syria fortified the ceasefire line, which ran along the eastern edge of Majdal Shams, the community was isolated from the rest of Syria. Many residents were separated from their relatives living or working in Syrian-controlled territory—as many as 50% from at least one sibling, parent, or child.

Majdal Shams retained close ties to Syria. Residents frequently gathered at the eastern edge of the village with bullhorns to shout messages to friends and relatives on the Syrian side of the ceasefire line. Through the 1970s, and often later, many households refused to pay taxes to Israel. In 1981, when the Israeli Knesset formally extended Israeli law to the Golan Heights and attempted to force Israeli citizenship to residents of Majdal Shams, the community staged a 19-week general strike in protest. Although Israeli troops blockaded the town and offered residents to accept citizen identification cards, the protesters succeeded in convincing the state to classify members of the community as non-citizens. Residents retained the right to apply for Israeli citizenship individually. Many of the Druze who had received I.D. cards denied having voluntarily applied for them, alleging that the Israeli military had forced them to accept the cards and had forcibly confiscated documents proving Syrian citizenship.

During the 1970s, a few residents of Majdal Shams received permission to cross the ceasefire line into Syrian-controlled territory, either to rejoin relatives or attend university in Damascus. During the 1990s, large numbers of residents began to receive permission to cross the ceasefire line to conduct religious pilgrimages or attend university. A small number of women also applied to cross the ceasefire line and marry Syrian men. This crossing program was the subject of the film The Syrian Bride.

==== 2000–2019 ====
From 2008 to 2017, Dolan Abu Saleh was the appointed head of the local council. In the elections of 2018, in which many residents chose not to participate, Abu Saleh was elected as mayor with 96% of the vote. His local party won all the seats in the council.

Israel appoints the teachers in Majdal Shams, prohibiting pro-Syrian views in schools. Israel used to appoint the local council and had imprisoned residents that protested.

==== 2020–present ====
In March 2024, Abu Saleh was re-elected with 58% of the vote. His party won 6 seats in the council.

On 27 July 2024, a rocket attack on a soccer field in Majdal Shams killed 12 children and teenagers. Israel, United States, and weapon analysts attributed the attack to Hezbollah. Following this, the Jewish Agency, JFED of North America, and Keren Hayesod announced 600,000 NIS in donations to the town, stating in a letter, "We see the Druze community as family." A memorial was constructed at the site of the rocket impact. Two years after the attack, volunteers from Birthright Israel built eight therapeutic gardens for the residents of Majdal Shams. At the gardens' dedication, Mayor Dolan Abu Saleh said in his remarks that following the October 7 attacks, the Golan Druze had realized that their security was tied to that of Israel, and that on October 8, they "accepted the Jews and Israelis as our home". Abu Saleh further added that the construction of the gardens meant that "the Jews finally accepted us".

On 15 March 2026, the town held its first Israeli military funeral. Maher Khatar, who had enlisted in the IDF and become a Sgt. First Class in the Combat Engineering corps, was killed during fighting in Southern Lebanon.

== Geography ==
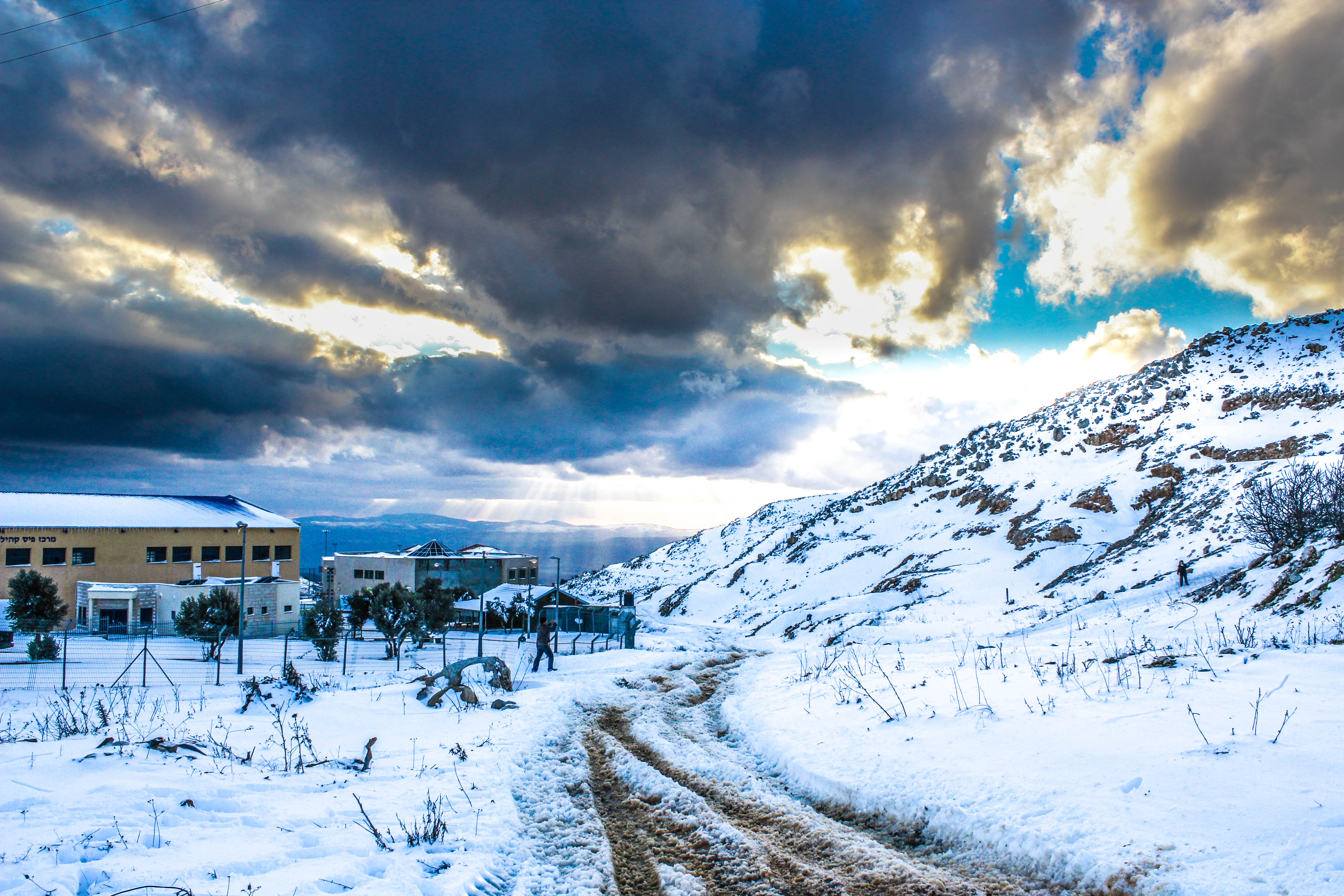
Majdal Shams in winter

=== Climate ===
Majdal Shams has a Mediterranean climate (Csa/Csb), with an average annual precipitation of 817 millimetres (32.2 in). Summers are warm and dry and winters are chilly and wetter, with the possibility of snowfall.

Climate data for Majdal Shams
| Month | Jan | Feb | Mar | Apr | May | Jun | Jul | Aug | Sep | Oct | Nov | Dec | Year |
|---|---|---|---|---|---|---|---|---|---|---|---|---|---|
| Mean daily maximum °C (°F) | 8.2 (46.8) | 9.5 (49.1) | 12.9 (55.2) | 17.3 (63.1) | 22.3 (72.1) | 25.7 (78.3) | 27.3 (81.1) | 27.8 (82.0) | 25.7 (78.3) | 22.3 (72.1) | 16.6 (61.9) | 10.7 (51.3) | 18.9 (65.9) |
| Daily mean °C (°F) | 5 (41) | 5.9 (42.6) | 8.8 (47.8) | 12.6 (54.7) | 16.9 (62.4) | 20.1 (68.2) | 21.9 (71.4) | 22.3 (72.1) | 20.2 (68.4) | 17.1 (62.8) | 12.4 (54.3) | 7.5 (45.5) | 14.2 (57.6) |
| Mean daily minimum °C (°F) | 1.9 (35.4) | 2.6 (36.7) | 4.7 (40.5) | 8.0 (46.4) | 11.5 (52.7) | 14.5 (58.1) | 16.6 (61.9) | 16.9 (62.4) | 14.8 (58.6) | 11.9 (53.4) | 8.2 (46.8) | 4.3 (39.7) | 9.7 (49.4) |
| Average precipitation mm (inches) | 191 (7.5) | 163 (6.4) | 124 (4.9) | 46 (1.8) | 22 (0.9) | 1 (0.0) | 0 (0) | 0 (0) | 2 (0.1) | 22 (0.9) | 81 (3.2) | 165 (6.5) | 817 (32.2) |
Source: Climate-data.org

== Demography ==
Historical population
| Year | Pop. | ±% |
|---|---|---|
| 1983 | 5,200 | — |
| 1995 | 7,300 | +40.4% |
| 2008 | 9,500 | +30.1% |
| 2022 | 11,103 | +16.9% |
| 2024 | 11,264 | +1.5% |

=== Numbers ===
According to the Israel Central Bureau of Statistics, Majdal Shams's population was 11,264 in 2024, the vast majority of them Druze. The population growth rate is 2.5%. The ratio between men and women is 951 women for every 1,000 men.

=== Religion ===
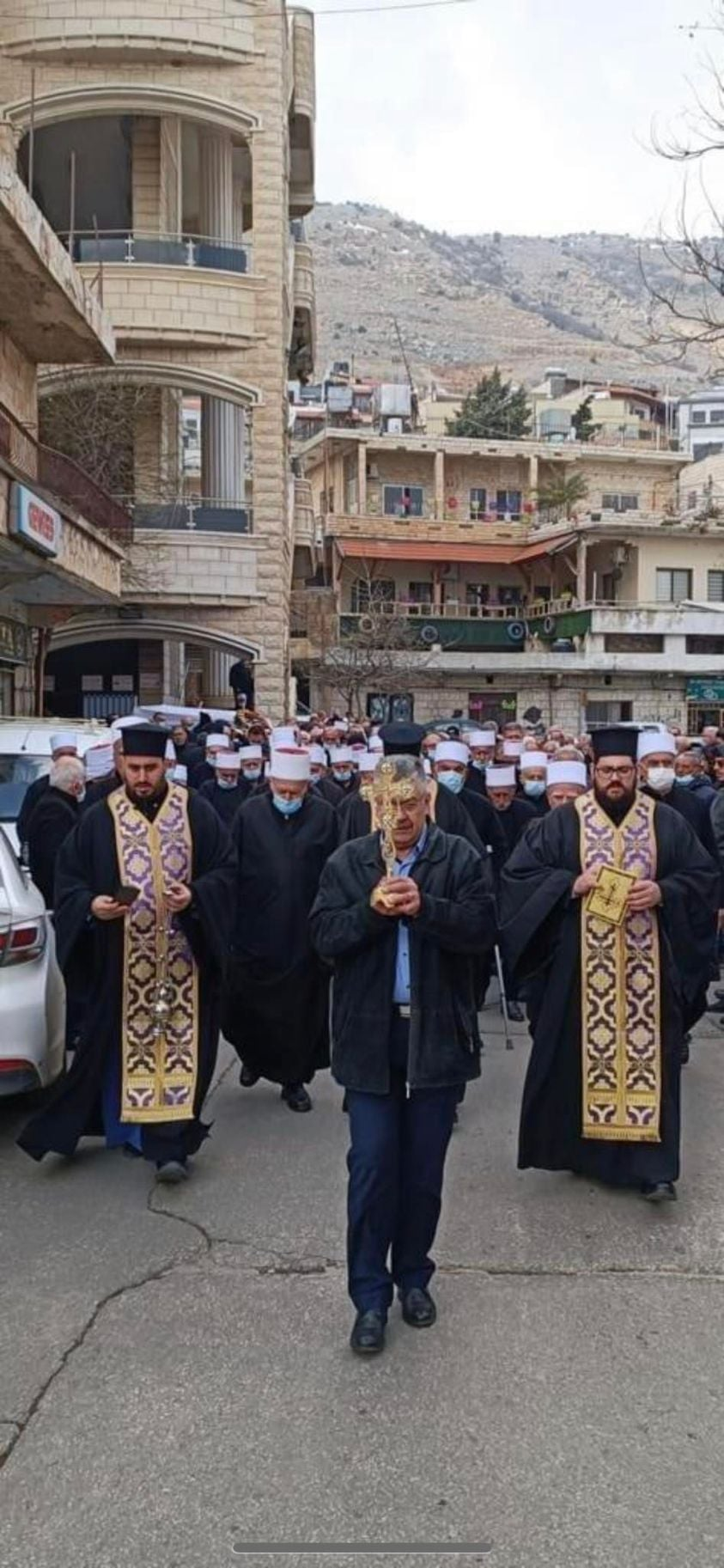
Druze attend a Christian funeral in Majdal Shams

Most of the town's residents are Druze, but a few Christians remain of a much larger community that left the town in the 1940s and 1950s.

=== Citizenship ===
The inhabitants of Majdal Shams are considered Syrian citizens by the Syrian authorities. Since 1981 they have also been considered permanent residents of Israel. While they are entitled to full Israeli citizenship, as of 2011 only 10 percent of the Golan Druze had opted to become Israeli citizens. As of 2011, many residents had kept in contact with their relatives in Syria and travelled there to visit family or study. Damascus University was open to them free of charge. However, the number of Druze who took Israeli citizenship jumped to over 20% by 2018 and kept rising during the Syrian Civil War. In early 2026, following the fall of the Assad government and a massacre of Druze in southern Syria, the percent of the village that had gone through the process to become Israeli citizens rose to 38%.

Those who apply for Israeli citizenship are entitled to vote, run for Knesset and receive an Israeli passport. For foreign travel, non-citizens are issued a laissez passer by the Israeli authorities. As Israel does not recognize their Syrian citizenship, they are defined in Israeli records as "residents of the Golan Heights." Residents of Majdal Shams are not drafted by the Israel Defense Forces, but as of 2024 there are individual cases of residents serving in the army.

As permanent residents, Majdal Shams inhabitants are free to work and study in Israel and are entitled to state services such as HMO (Kupat Holim) health insurance. They are also free to move at will and live anywhere they choose in Israel.

== Economy ==
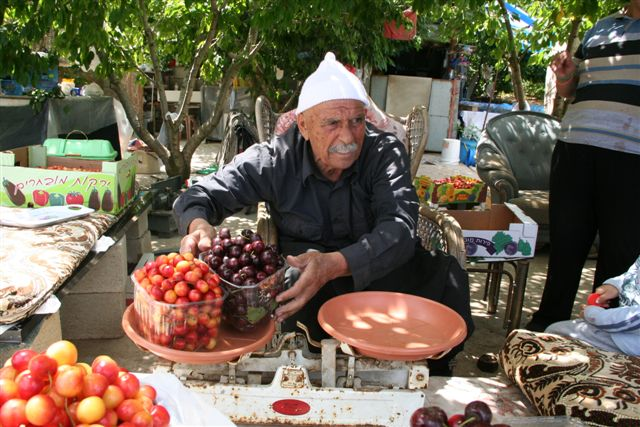
Golan Heights cherries

The town is surrounded by apple and cherry orchards. Villagers sold their apples to Syria despite the closed border. However, the Syrian civil war has halted this trade, forcing local growers to sell their apples in Israel, where they struggle to compete with market prices. As a result, some farmers have diversified their crops, planting vegetables such as tomatoes, eggplants, okra, and black-eyed peas.

Local tourism is another major source of income. Tourists often visit the village to experience its unique cultural and gastronomic offerings. The scenic landscape, characterized by rows of apple and cherry trees interspersed with vegetable plots, provides a picturesque backdrop for agritourism. Visitors can explore the orchards, participate in fruit picking, and enjoy the local produce.

The town is home to several non-governmental organizations, including Golan for the Development of the Arab Villages, and Al-Marsad: Arab Human Rights Center in Golan Heights.

== Transportation ==
The Golan Regional Council operates three buses per day from Majdal Shams to the Israeli city of Kiryat Shmona. The bus line begins at El Rom, and also stops at Buq'ata, Mas'ade, and Neve Ativ. The bus ride to Kiryat Shmona takes approximately 25 minutes. Majdal Shams is located along Highway 98, a major road running through the Golan Heights.

== Attractions ==
One kilometer east of the town center is Shouting Hill, where residents used to line up with bullhorns to make small-talk with relatives on the Syrian controlled side before the advent of cellphones.

== Media and arts ==
Majdal Shams has a thriving arts scene. Local bands like TootArd and Hawa Dafi have toured internationally. Local visual artists are supported by the Fateh Mudarris Center for Arts and Culture.

Majdal Shams was featured in the award-winning 2004 Israeli film The Syrian Bride.

== Cuisine ==
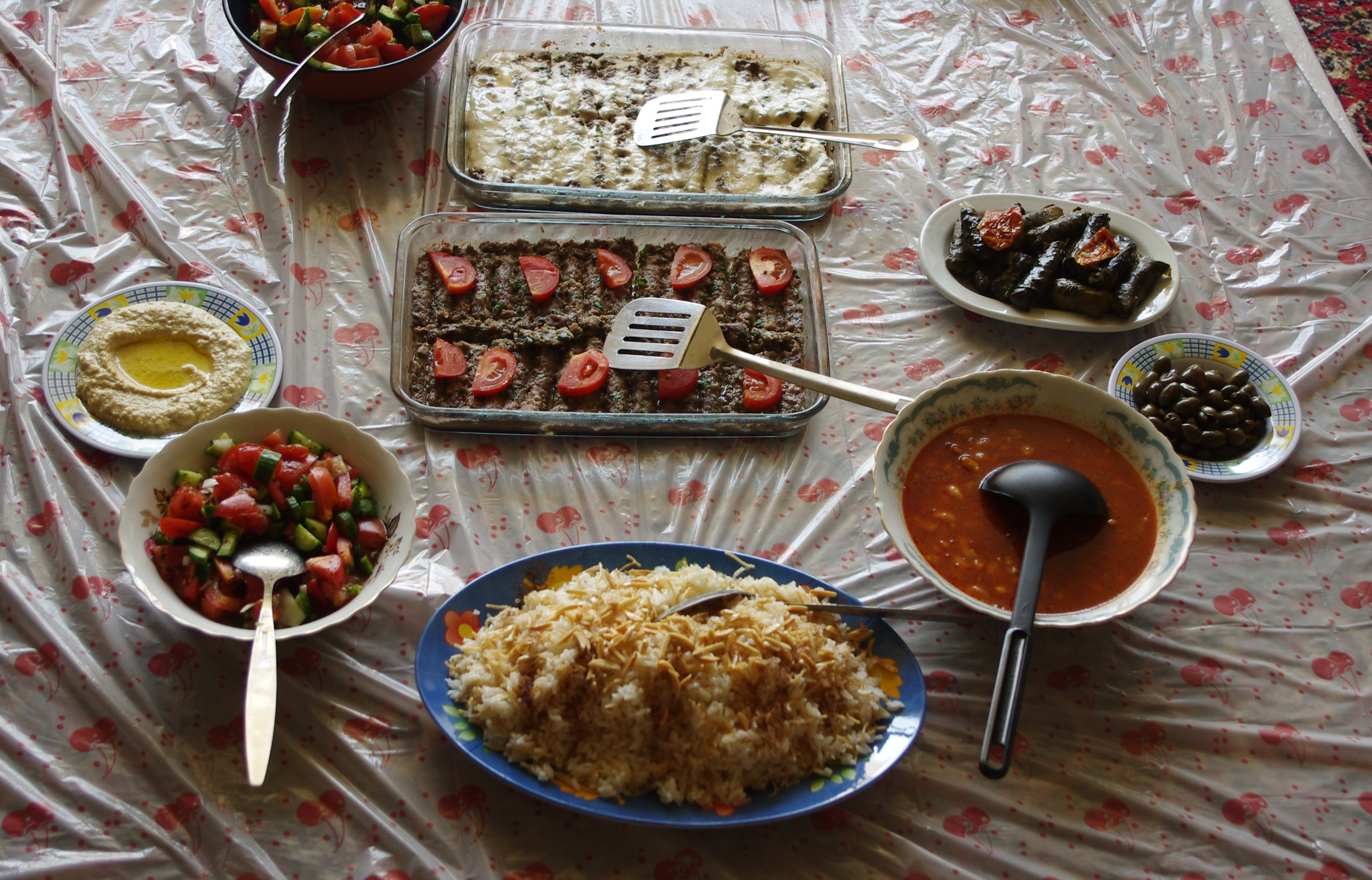
Druze cuisine in Majdal Shams

The Golan Heights is known for its Syrian/Druze Arab cuisine that blends regional ingredients with traditional recipes. Key elements include bulgur and freekeh, produced at Said Ibrahim's mill, and kishk, a fermented milk product made from bulgur and goat milk yogurt used in winter soups. Abu Jabel's factory specializes in knafeh, a dessert featuring kadaif noodles, cheese, sugar syrup, and pistachios.

== Voting Patterns ==
In the 2026 election, 84 percent of voters in Majdal Shams voted for the parties of the center-left coalition led by Gadi Eisenkot, while 10 percent voted for the parties of the right-wing coalition led by Benjamin Netanyahu and 3 percent voted for the Arab parties. An additional 1.6 percent voted for the Reservists. Voter turnout more than quadrupled compared to the 2022 election, one of the largest increases of any town in Israel (the only other comparable towns are the three other Druze towns in the Golan), which is mostly attributable to the surge in Israeli citizenship among the Golan Druze as a result of the fall of the Assad regime and the 2025 massacres of Druze in southern Syria.

== See also ==
- Druze in Syria
- Christianity in Syria
- Majdal Shams attack
