= Nabatieh Fawka attack =

1996 Israeli airstrike in Lebanon

- Part of Operation Grapes of Wrath
- Ibrahim Abed, 15, trapped under the rubble

- Location: 33.35609770976337°N 35.495629224522226°E; Nabatieh Fawka, Lebanon
- Date: 16 April 1996; 6:30 AM (UTC+03:00)
- Attack type: Airstrike
- Deaths: 9
- Injuries: 2
- Perpetrator: Israel Defence Forces (IDF)

The Nabatieh Fawka attack occurred on 16 April 1996, when Israeli warplanes bombed an apartment in the village of Nabatieh Fawka, killing nine people, seven of whom were children.

== Context ==
On September 19, 1994, the village came under attack and was hit with Israeli flechette-filled shells that killed 4 civilians, and wounded another four.

The attack was one of several incidents in mid April 1996 which occurred shortly after Israel announced the execution of Operation Grapes of Wrath on the 11th of that month. In these instances, Israeli helicopter missiles killed Lebanese civilians. On the 13th, an Israeli Apache helicopter, after hovering for several minutes over the Shiite village of Mansouri 8 kilometres from the Israeli border, fired a missile at an ambulance as it was passing a UN checkpoint. The vehicle was carrying 13 people, aware of Israeli requests that villages in the south evacuate their residents, who were fleeing. 4 children and two women were incinerated. It later stated that the village ambulance, (Note: The vehicle was painted white with a flashing blue light on the roof, had, under Israeli observation ferried wounded people to hospital, and had been purchased with expatriate funds by the village's diaspora community. A Reuters reporter filmed the strike's immediate aftermath.) either was a vehicle owned by a member of Hezbollah or was hiding one of its guerillas, a claim denied by Robert Fisk who interviewed eyewitnesses on the site soon afterwards. (Note: The people in the ambulance were identified as Abba Jiha, the driver, and 13 passengers: his wife Mona, their 4 children -Mehdi (6), Zeinab (9), Hanin (5) and Mariam (2 months) -Fadila al-Oglah and her aunt Nowkal; Mohamed Hisham, a window repairman; Nowkal's daughter Nadia al-Khalid and her 4 nieces, Sahar (3), Aida (7), Hudu (11) and Manar (13).) Hezbollah retaliated the following day by firing 81 Katyusha rockets into Israel, 28% of the total it launched during the Israeli operation.

On the 18th of April, Israeli artillery opened fire on the Shiite and Catholic Melkite village of Qana, killing 106 people in what became known as the Qana massacre. In other incidents that week, an Israeli helicopter pilot fired a missile at a car near the Jieh power station driven by a young woman who had just stopped to buy a sandwich. In West Beirut a two-year-old girl was decapitated by another missile.

== Attack ==
The village of Nabatieh Fawka, 20 miles north of Qana, is located on a stretch of hills 3 km north of the Nabatieh city. The Al Abed had family moved there since it seemed a relatively safer location, out of the way of the IDF and the South Lebanon Army. The father, Hassan, was absent at the time, since he had departed to perform the Hajj in Mecca.

Around 5 AM, IDF helicopters were flying over the area. At 6:30, they fired rockets at the two-story house where the family was sleeping, completely demolishing it. They also hit two other buildings, causing severe damage. Initial reports from the Lebanese Army stated that 11 civilians had been killed, including a four-day-old infant.

== Aftermath ==
Shortly after the attack, the IDF released a statement claiming that it was a "response to a Hezbollah attack in the security zone". Investigations by Amnesty International and Human Rights Watch found no evidence that Hezbollah was hiding in the building.

Israeli Prime Minister Shimon Peres blamed the civilians for staying in Nabatieh, saying that they should have left earlier.

The IDF attack on the UNIFIL compound in Qana, leaving 106 civilians dead, took place later on the same day.

Operation Grapes of Wrath concluded shortly after this last attack. In 16 days, Israel carried out 600 air strikes and fired some 25,000 shells into Southern Lebanon, resulting in the death of 154 civilians and a further 351 injured.

The incident has been cited in a recent study of media bias in reporting conflicts in the Middle East.

== Notes ==
=== Sources ===
- Aima, Abhinav K. (2019). Push-Pull Hezbollah: The New York Times and the Washington Post News Coverage of Three Israel-Lebanon Conflicts (1996, 2000, 2006) (Thesis). Ohio University. Archived from the original (Phd dissertation) on 2021-04-23.
- Bardan, Fadi (19 April 1996). "Israeli Attacks Kill 75 In South Lebanon". Associated Press. ·
- Catignani, Sergio (2008). Israeli Counter-Insurgency and the Intifadas: Dilemmas of a Conventional Army. Taylor & Francis. ISBN 978-1-134-07998-8.
- Fisk, Robert (17 May 1997). "Is this some kind of crusade?". The Independent.
- Fisk, Robert (2006). The Great War for Civilisation: The Conquest of the Middle East. HarperPerennial. ISBN 978-1-84115-008-6.
- ""Operation Grapes of Wrath": The Civilian Victims". Vol. 9, no. 8 E. Human Rights Watch. September 1997.
- Jehl, Douglas (19 April 1996). "Death in Lebanon: Israel barrage hits U.N. camp in Lebanon, killing at least 75". New York Times.
- Lein, Yehezkel (January 2000). Israeli Violations of Human Rights of Lebanese Civilians (PDF). Jerusalem: B'tselem.
- Press, Associated (29 April 1996). "Lebanese Bury Dead". Washington Post.
