= Al-Marsad =

Human rights organization

Al-Marsad - Arab Human Rights Centre in Golan Heights
- Founded: 2003
- Tax ID no.: 580424687 (Israel Non-Profit Registrar)
- Location: Majdal Shams
- Region served: Golan Heights
- Key people: Dr. Nizar Ayoub, Consultant, Legal Adviser
- Website: golan-marsad.org

Al-Marsad – Arab Human Rights Centre in Golan Heights is an independent, not-for-profit international human rights organization with no religious or political affiliation that operates in the Golan Heights. The Golan Heights region is internationally recognised as Syrian territory occupied by Israel, although Israel asserts it has a right to retain control over the area. The organisation was created in October 2003 and is run from Majdal Shams. It was the first human rights organisation founded in the Golan.

Al-Marsad is registered with the Israeli Registrar of Non-Profits, and is a member of the OPGAI (Occupied Palestinian and Golan Advocacy Initiative) and Convenio Palestina 2015.

== Issues and campaigns ==
=== Human rights and humanitarian law ===
Al-Marsad has published detailed legal studies on behalf of affected individuals in the Golan Heights, concerning: forced evictions and internal displacement, the illegality of family separation, parallel reports to the Committee on the Elimination of Racial Discrimination, including advocacy before the United Nations Office of the High Commissioner for Human Rights concerning human rights abuses, economic occupation, and Israeli violations of international law.

Al-Marsad has also voiced concern over what it deems Israel's "ethnic cleansing" of the Syrian Arab population in the Golan. 130,000 Syrian Arabs from the Golan Heights were expelled or fled to Syria following Israel's capture of the territory in 1967. Most villages were also destroyed by Israeli forces, leaving six villages and 23,000 Syrian residents remaining in the Golan.

Al-Marsad has reported that Israeli settlers receive five times the amount of water than the area's Syrian farmers do, and that land has been expropriated for Israeli settlements. Al-Marsad has also reported that Arab residents, moreover, pay more taxes to Israel than their Israeli counterparts while receiving fewer services.

=== Israeli (de facto) annexation of the Golan Heights ===
Al-Marsad campaigns against Israel's (de facto) annexation of the Syrian Golan Heights.

== See also ==
- Israel–Syria relations
- UN Security Council Resolution 452
- UN Security Council Resolution 465
- UN Security Council Resolution 471
- UN Security Council Resolution 497
