= Al-Mansouri =

Al-Mansouri المنصوري
- Municipality
- Location within Lebanon
- Coordinates: 33°10′25″N 35°12′36″E
- Grid position: 169/286
- Country: Lebanon
- Governorate: South Governorate
- District: Tyre
- Elevation: 50 m (160 ft)
- Time zone: GMT +3

Al-Mansouri (Arabic: المنصوري, romanized: al-Manṣūrī) is a municipality in the Tyre District in South Lebanon.

== History ==
In the 1596 tax records in the early Ottoman era, it was named as a village, Mansura, in the nahiya (subdistrict) of Tibnin under the liwa' (district) of Safad. It had a population of 33 households, all Muslim. The villagers paid a fixed tax-rate of 25% on various agricultural products, including 1,300 akçe on wheat, 350 on barley; 150 on olive trees, 100 on "occasional revenues"; a total of 1,900 akçe.

In 1875 Victor Guérin noted here about "a dozen houses built with ancient materials, quite regularly carved. A oualy was dedicated to Neby Mansour. Cisterns dug into the rock and several broken sarcophagi also prove that this hamlet, now inhabited by some poor Métualis families, has succeeded a much larger former village."

The PEF's Survey of Western Palestine described the village: "A village built of stone, on the plain, surrounded by olives, figs, and arable land; contains about 50 Moslems. Water from cisterns and spring near shore." They also noted some rock-cut tombs by the village.

On 13 April 1996, during Operation Grapes of Wrath, an Israel Defense Forces (IDF) helicopter attacked a vehicle in Al-Mansouri, killing two women and four children.

== Demographics ==
In 2014 Muslims made up 99.73% of registered voters in Al-Mansouri. 99.09% of the voters were Shiite Muslims.

== Turtle Reserve ==
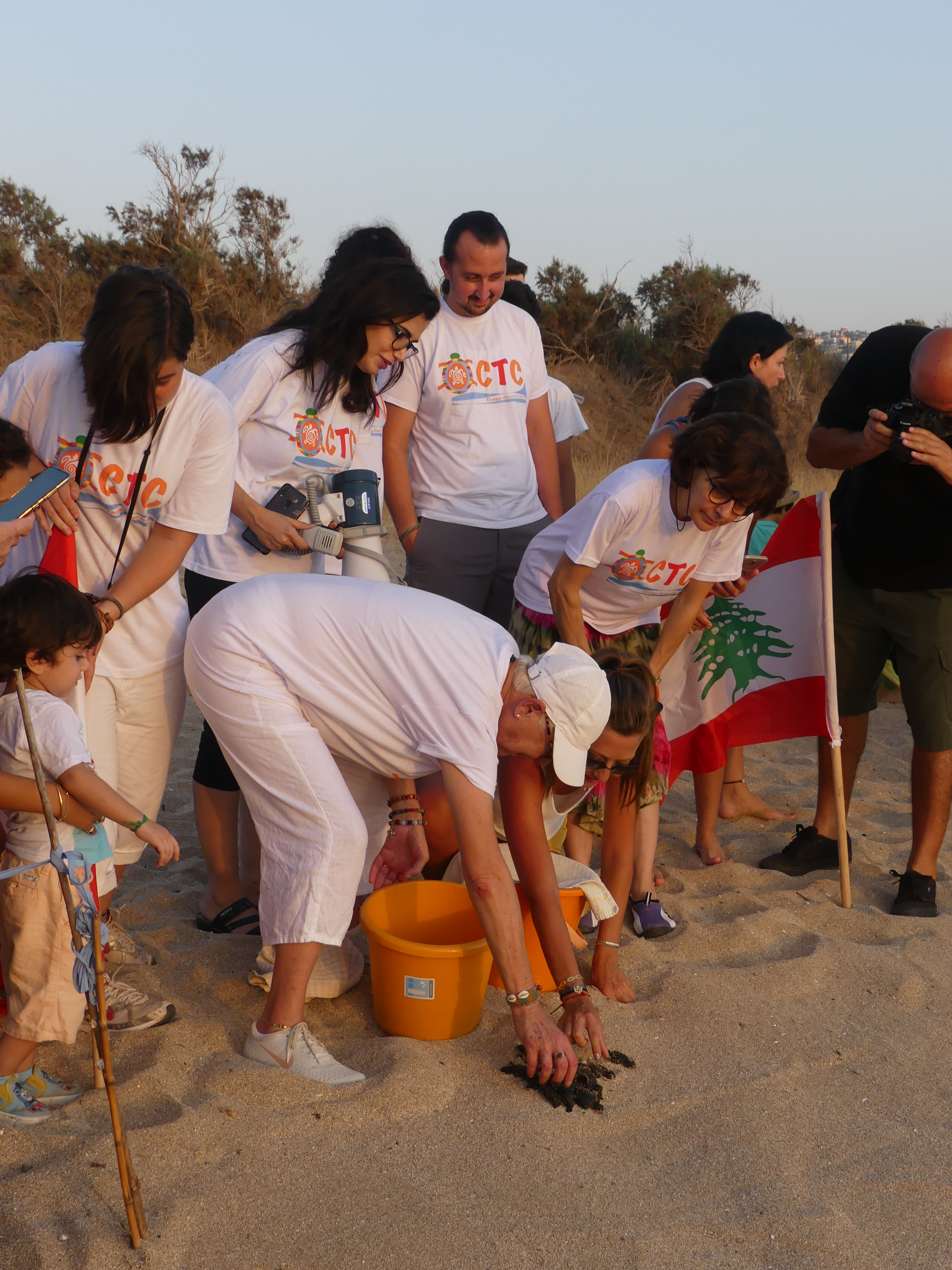
Lebanese conservationist Mona Khalil releasing sea turtle hatchlings on Mansouri beach, a major nesting site south of Tyre.

In early 2000, environmentalist Mona Khalil – who had inherited her family's beachfront farm that stretches from the main road to the yet unspoiled beaches – moved to Al-Mansouri from the Netherlands, where she had lived in exile for 25 years. Three months later, the IDF ended two decades of Israeli occupation in the nearby buffer zone and withdrew with its allies of the South Lebanon Army from there. In the same year, Khalil and her associate Habiba Fayed opened their Orange House Project as a bed-and-breakfast in order to finance their efforts to protect the nesting grounds of endangered sea turtles through ecotourism.

In June 2017, a television crew from LBCI was attacked while filming an interview with Mona Khalil at the turtle reserve. An unidentified assailant disrupted the filming, assaulting cameraman Samir Baitamouni and verbally threatening Khalil, citing affiliations with Hezbollah and Amal. Journalist Sobhiyya Najjar captured the incident on her mobile phone.

== Bibliography ==
- Conder, C.R.; Kitchener, H.H. (1881). The Survey of Western Palestine: Memoirs of the Topography, Orography, Hydrography, and Archaeology. Vol. 1. London: Committee of the Palestine Exploration Fund.
- Guérin, V. (1880). Description Géographique Historique et Archéologique de la Palestine (in French). Vol. 3: Galilee, pt. 2. Paris: L'Imprimerie Nationale.
- Hütteroth, W.-D.; Abdulfattah, K. (1977). Historical Geography of Palestine, Transjordan and Southern Syria in the Late 16th Century. Erlanger Geographische Arbeiten, Sonderband 5. Erlangen, Germany: Vorstand der Fränkischen Geographischen Gesellschaft. ISBN 3-920405-41-2.
- Rhode, H. (1979). Administration and Population of the Sancak of Safed in the Sixteenth Century (PhD). Columbia University. Archived from the original on 10 October 2016.
- Palmer, E.H. (1881). The Survey of Western Palestine: Arabic and English Name Lists Collected During the Survey by Lieutenants Conder and Kitchener, R.E. Transliterated and Explained by E.H. Palmer. Committee of the Palestine Exploration Fund.
