= Route 989 (Golan Heights) =

Route in Israel

Route 989
- כביש 989

Route information
- Length: 11 km (6.8 mi)

Major junctions
- West end: Sa'ar Junction
- East end: Majdal Shams Junction

Location
- Country: Israel

Highway system
- Roads in Israel; Highways
← Route 978	→ Route 999

Highway 989 is a regional route in the northern Golan, connecting Sa'ar on Highway 99 with Majdal Shams on Highway 98.

Route 989 is maintained by the National Roads Company of Israel.

== History ==
The road was paved by the Jewish National Fund to connect Neve Ativ to Banias with a shorter route than Highway 99 through Masade. The road was designed to carry the bulk of the traffic of travellers to the Mount Hermon ski resort. Work on the road began at the end of 1971 and ended at the beginning of 1973. The tarring of the road with asphalt was carried out by the Maatz, which finished its section in August 1973.

== Junctions (West to East) ==
District	Location	km	mi	Name	Destinations	Notes
Northern	Sa'ar	0	0.0	צומת סער (Sa'ar Junction)	Highway 99	
Northern	Nimrod Castle	4	2.5	צומת ללא שם (Unnamed Junction)	Access to Nimrod Castle	
Northern	Ein Qiniyye	5	3.1	צומת קיניה (Qiniyye Junction)	Road 9894	
Northern	Neve Ativ	8	5.0	צומת נווה אטי"ב (Neve Ativ Junction)	Crossing through Neve Ativ	
Northern	Nimrod	10	6.2	צומת נמרוד (Nimrod Junction)	Road 9898	
Northern	Majdal Shams	11	6.8	צומת מג'דל שמס (Majdal Shams Junction)	Highway 98	
1.000 mi = 1.609 km; 1.000 km = 0.621 mi

== See also ==
- List of highways in Israel
