= Hermon Stream (Banias) Nature Reserve =

Nature reserve in the Golan Heights

Coordinates: 33°16′34.92″N 35°43′3.61″E

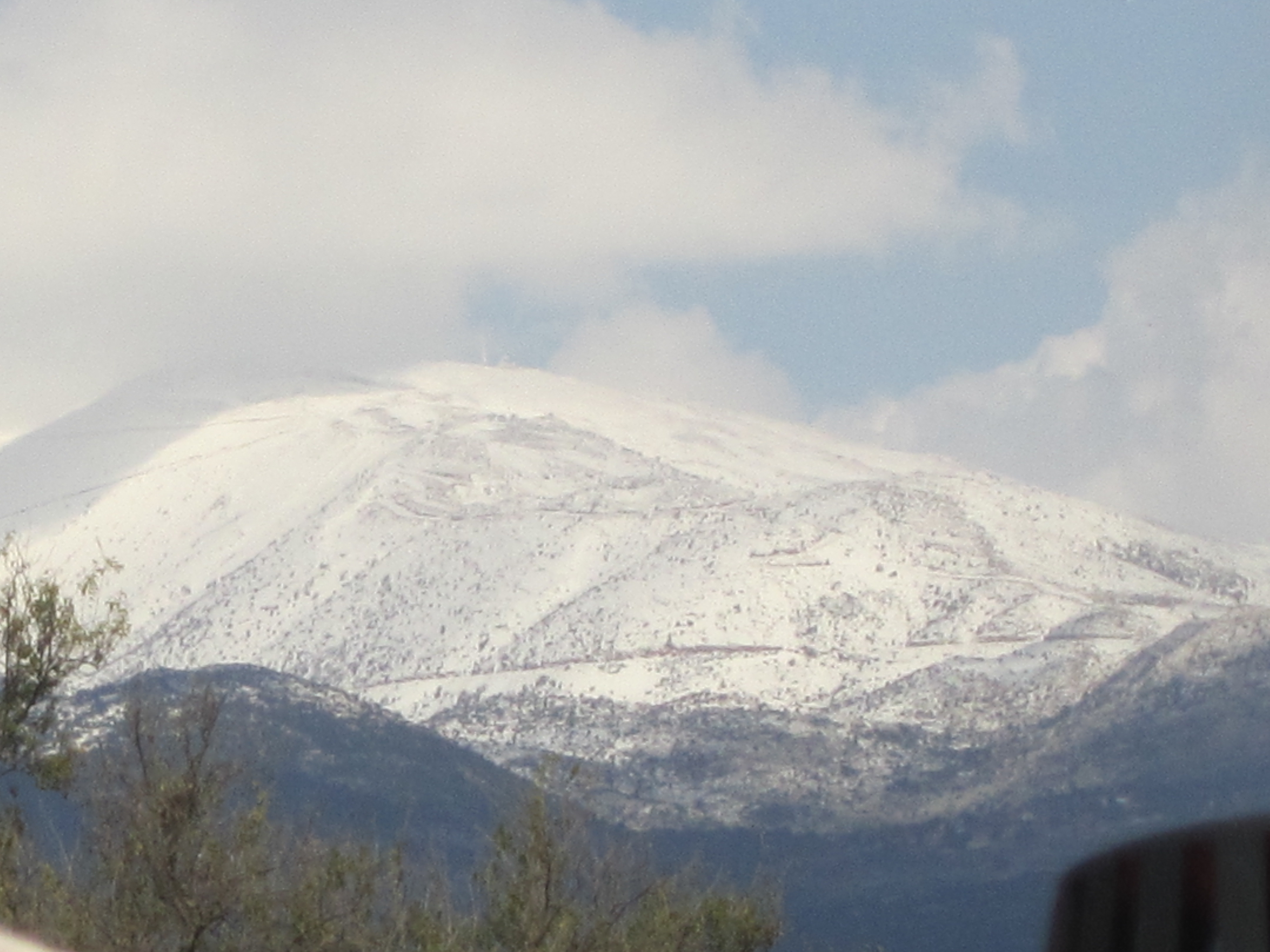
Mount Hermon covered in snow

Hermon nature reserve (Hebrew: שמורת חרמון) is a nature reserve in the north of the Golan Heights. It includes an area in southern Mount Hermon which is located in the Israeli occupied portion of the Golan Heights. The reserve excludes the Mount Hermon ski resort, Neve Ativ and the Nimrod Fortress National Park. The total area of the reserve is approximately 78,270 dunam (19,340 acres).

== Flora and fauna ==
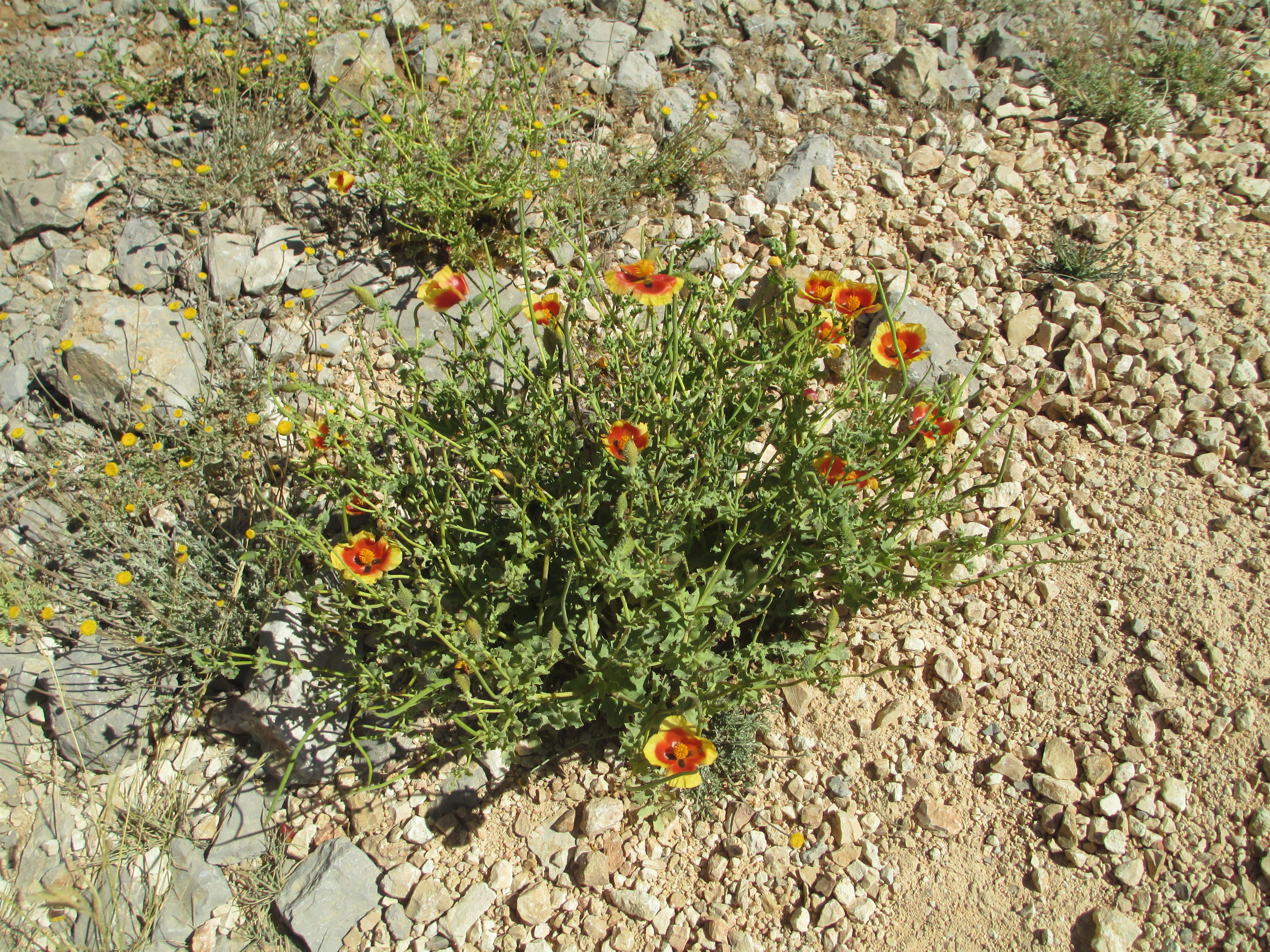
Glaucium Oxylobium on Mount Hermon

The common birds in the reserve include white-throated robin, western rock nuthatch, sombre tit and northern wheatear. There are many species of butterflies, of which 23 are unique to the Hermon nature reserve and do not exist in pre-1967 Israel. The common reptiles in the reserve include the Vipera bornmuelleri and the four-lined snake.

Due to the height of the mountain the growth and the blooming begins at the top of the mountain in August, instead of the spring.

In 1905 the botanist Aaron Aaronsohn discovered what he called "the mother of wheat", Triticum dicoccoides, on the eastern slopes of Mount Hermon. In its time, this was a discovery of the greatest importance, as there were plans to hybridize "wild wheat" with other cultivars to produce a grain more easily grown in inhospitable locations. Eventually, this plan was abandoned; it didn't work.
