= Wadi Araba Crossing =

Border crossing between Israel and Jordan

Wadi Araba Crossing تقاطع وادي عربة מעבר יצחק רבין
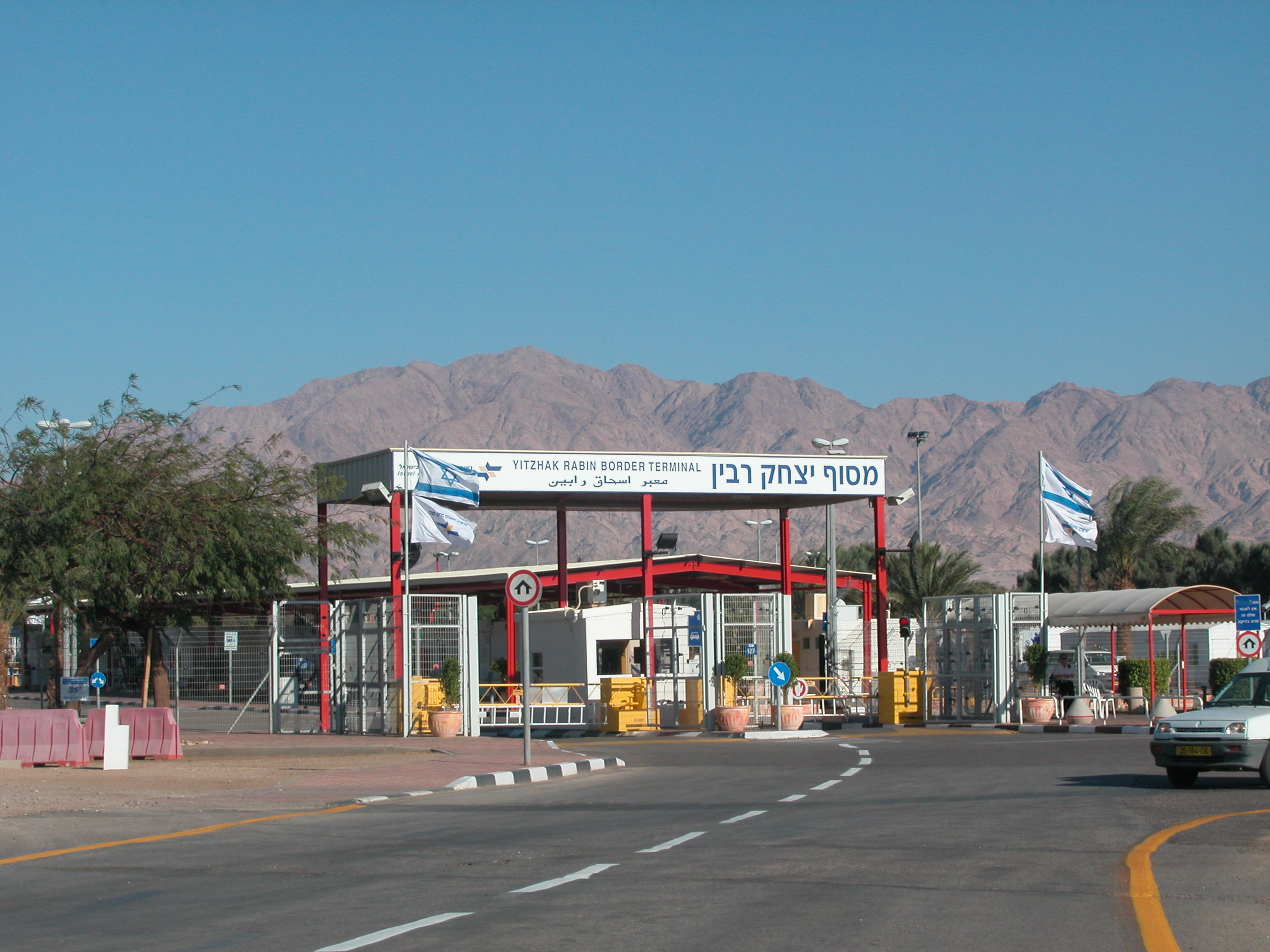
- The Yitzhak Rabin Border Terminal
- Coordinates: 29°34′30″N 34°58′41″E
- Carries: Pedestrians, Vehicles, Containers
- Crosses: Wadi Araba
- Locale: Aqaba, Jordan; Eilat, Israel
- Official name: Wadi Araba Border Crossing מסוף יצחק רבין; Until 2006: מעבר ערבה تقاطع وادي عربة
- Maintained by: Hashemite Kingdom of Jordan; Israel Airports Authority

History
- Opened: August 8, 1994

Statistics
- Daily traffic: 1287 pedestrians in 2010; 22 vehicles in 2010
- Toll: JD10.00 (Outbound Jordan) ₪101.00 (Outbound Israel)

Location
- Interactive map of Wadi Araba Crossing

The Wadi Araba Crossing (Jordanian name, Arabic: تقاطع وادي عربة) or Yitzhak Rabin Crossing (Israeli name, Hebrew: מעבר יצחק רבין) is an international border crossing between Aqaba, Jordan and Eilat, Israel. Opened on August 8, 1994, it is currently one of three entry/exit points between the two countries that handle tourists.

In February 2006, the Israelis renamed their border terminal to Yitzhak Rabin Terminal (Hebrew: מסוף יצחק רבין), after the assassinated Prime Minister who had signed the Israel–Jordan peace treaty in 1994.

The terminal is open from 6:30 to 20:00, Sunday through Thursday, and from 8:00 to 20:00 on Fridays and Saturdays, every day of the year except for the holidays of the Islamic New Year and Yom Kippur.

In 2010, 465,059 people and 8,007 vehicles have crossed the border.

== Israeli terminal ==
=== Transport to and from the terminal ===
The terminal can be reached by a 5-minute taxi ride from Eilat. Only privately owned Israeli cars may cross through it and travel within Jordan after a license plate change, registration and tax payment.

Route 109 runs east from Eilot interchange at Highway 90 to the border crossing. It is 1.5km long.

Public buses Route No. 390, 393, 394, 397, 399, 444, 990, 991 and 993 stop at the Junction of Highway 90 and Route 109. It is an approximately 20-minute walk from the bus stop to the terminal.

== Jordanian terminal ==
=== Aqaba Special Economic Zone Authority ===
Visitors from most countries receive a special employment/residency visa from the Aqaba Special Economic Zone Authority. It is affixed to the passport, generally next to the visa stamp granting the passport holder one month in The Hashemite Kingdom of Jordan. Anyone who wishes to overstay their visa must register with the Jordanian Police.

Some 85,172 Jordanian workers coming to work in southern Israel crossed into Israel through the Yitzhak Rabin crossing, up from 81,016 in 2006, marking a 5.8 percent increase.

== Gallery ==
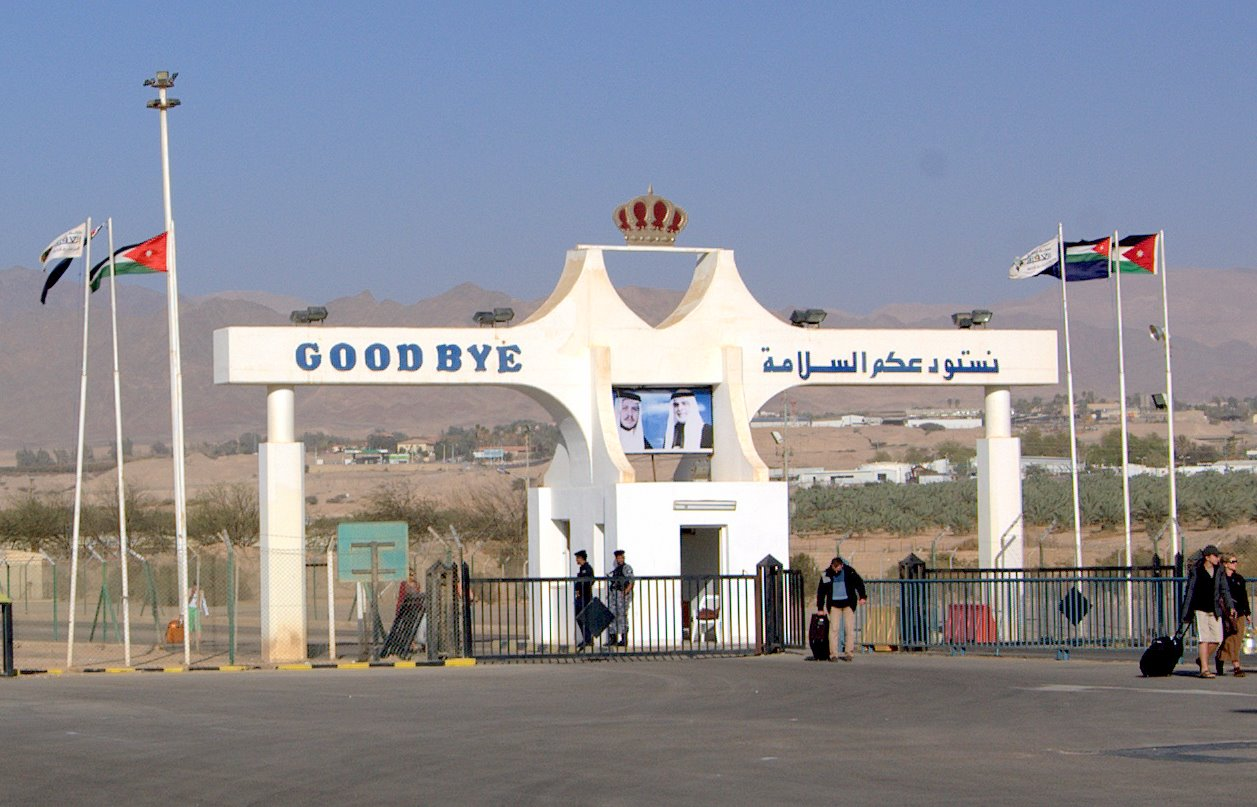
The crossing from Aqaba

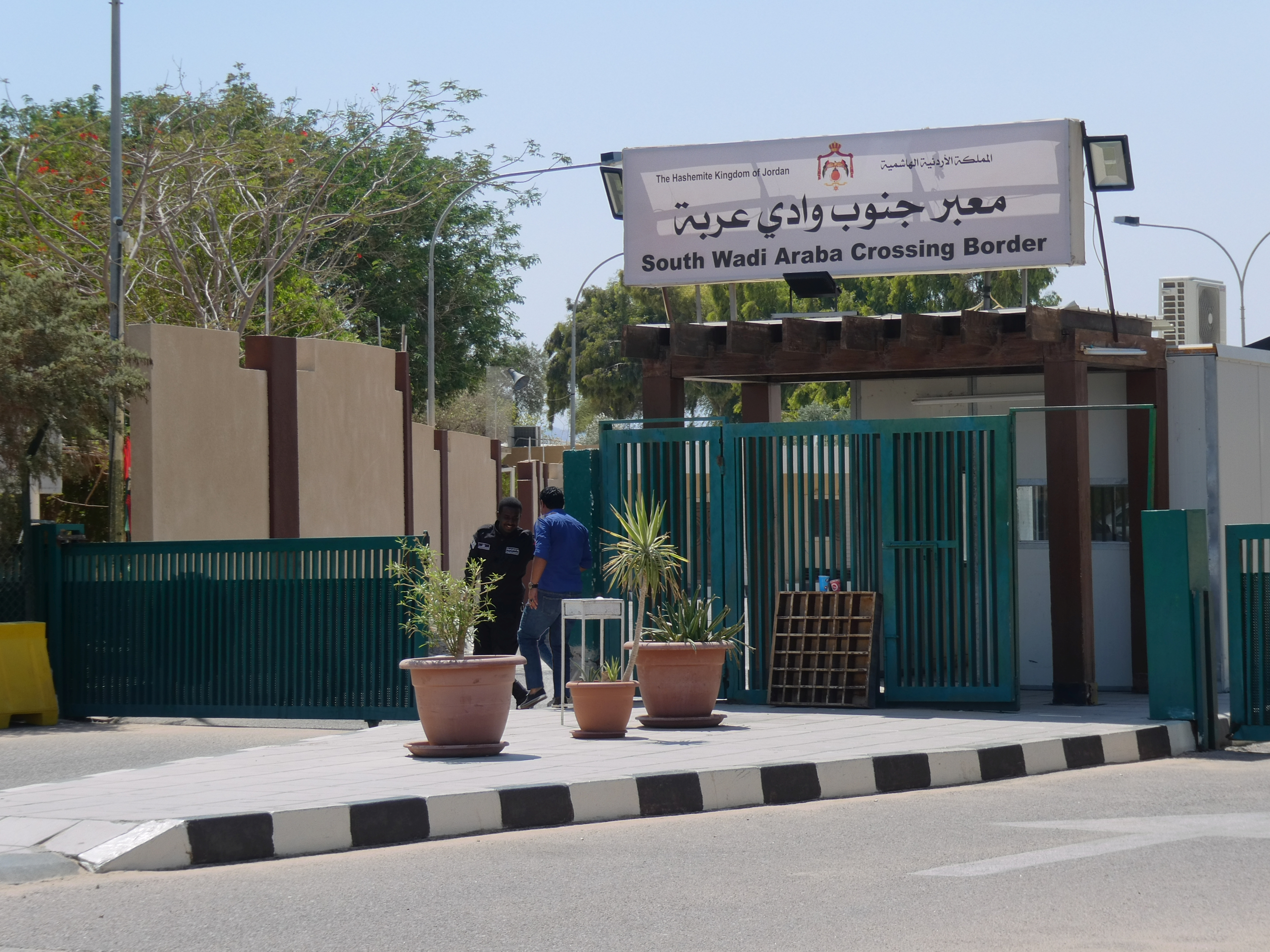
South Wadi Araba Crossing Border

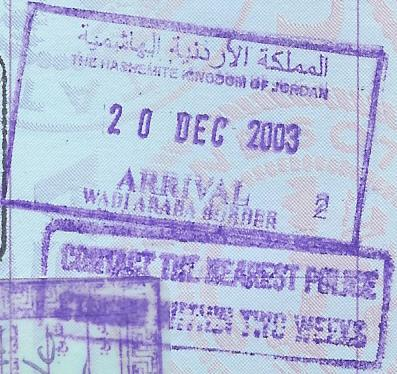
Entry stamp issued at the Wadi Araba crossing in a United States passport.

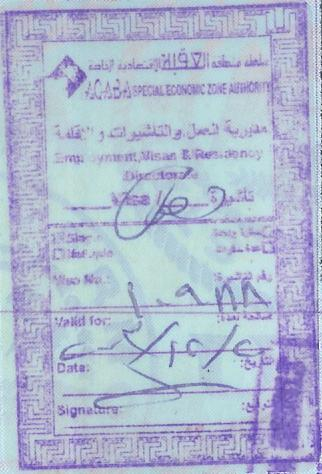
Aqaba Special Economic Zone Authority visa in a United States passport.

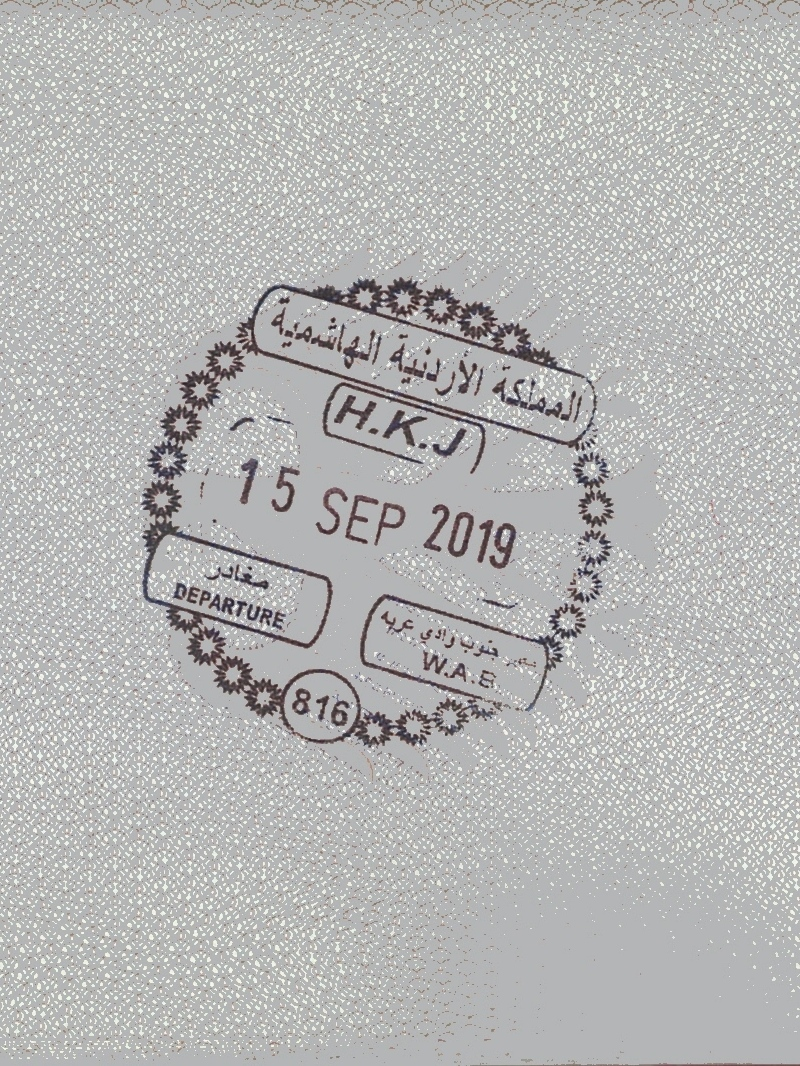
Departure stamp issued at the Wadi Araba crossing in a German passport
