= Route 109 (Israel) =

Route in Israel

Highway 109
- כביש 109

Route information
- Length: 1.34 km (0.83 mi)
- Existed: August 8, 1994–present

Major junctions
- West end: Eilot Interchange
- East end: Yitzhak Rabin Crossing

Location
- Country: Israel
- Major cities: Eilat

Highway system
- Roads in Israel; Highways
← Highway 99	→ Route 171

Route 109 is a regional road in Israel connecting Highway 90 to the Yitzhak Rabin Crossing. The road starts at the Eilot interchange with Highway 90 and ends at the entrance to the border crossing to Aqaba.

== Junctions & Interchanges (West to East) ==
District	Location	km	mi	Name	Destinations	Notes
Southern	Eilot	0	0.0	מחלף אילות (Eilot Interchange)	Highway 90	
Southern	Eilat	1.12	0.70	צומת ללא שם (Unnamed Junction)	Entrance to Eilat Ornithological Park	
Southern	Eilat	1.34	0.83	מעבר יצחק רבין (Yitzhak Rabin Crossing)	Yitzhak Rabin Crossing	
1.000 mi = 1.609 km; 1.000 km = 0.621 mi
