= Route 999 (Golan Heights) =

Route in Israel

Route 999
- כביש 999
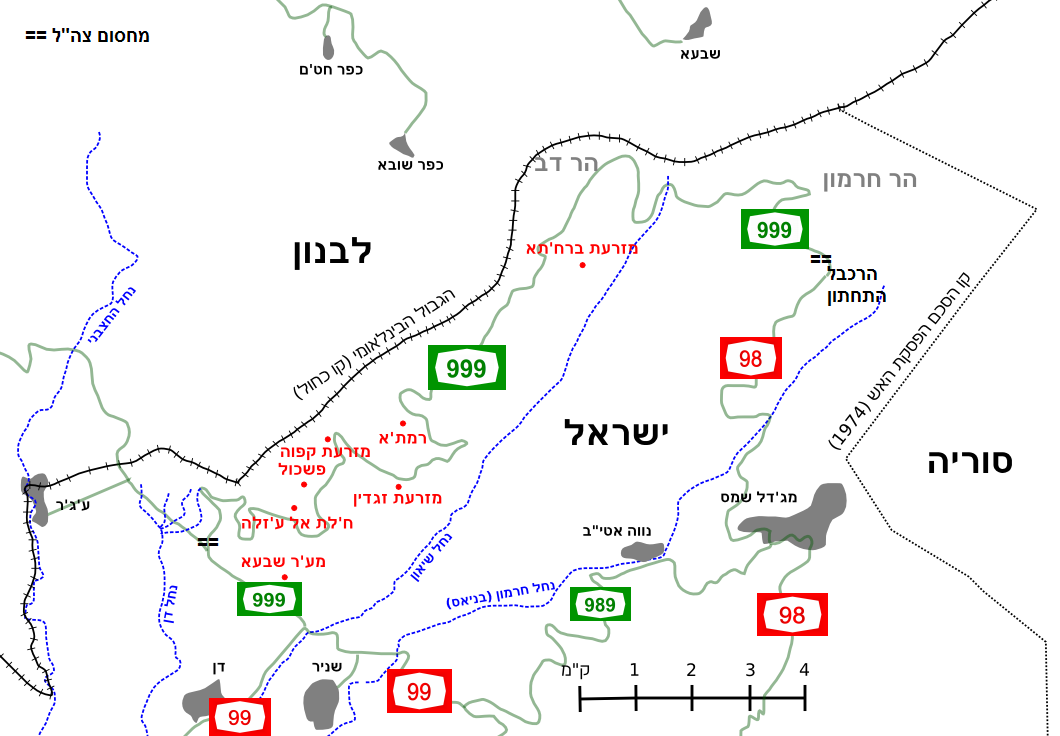

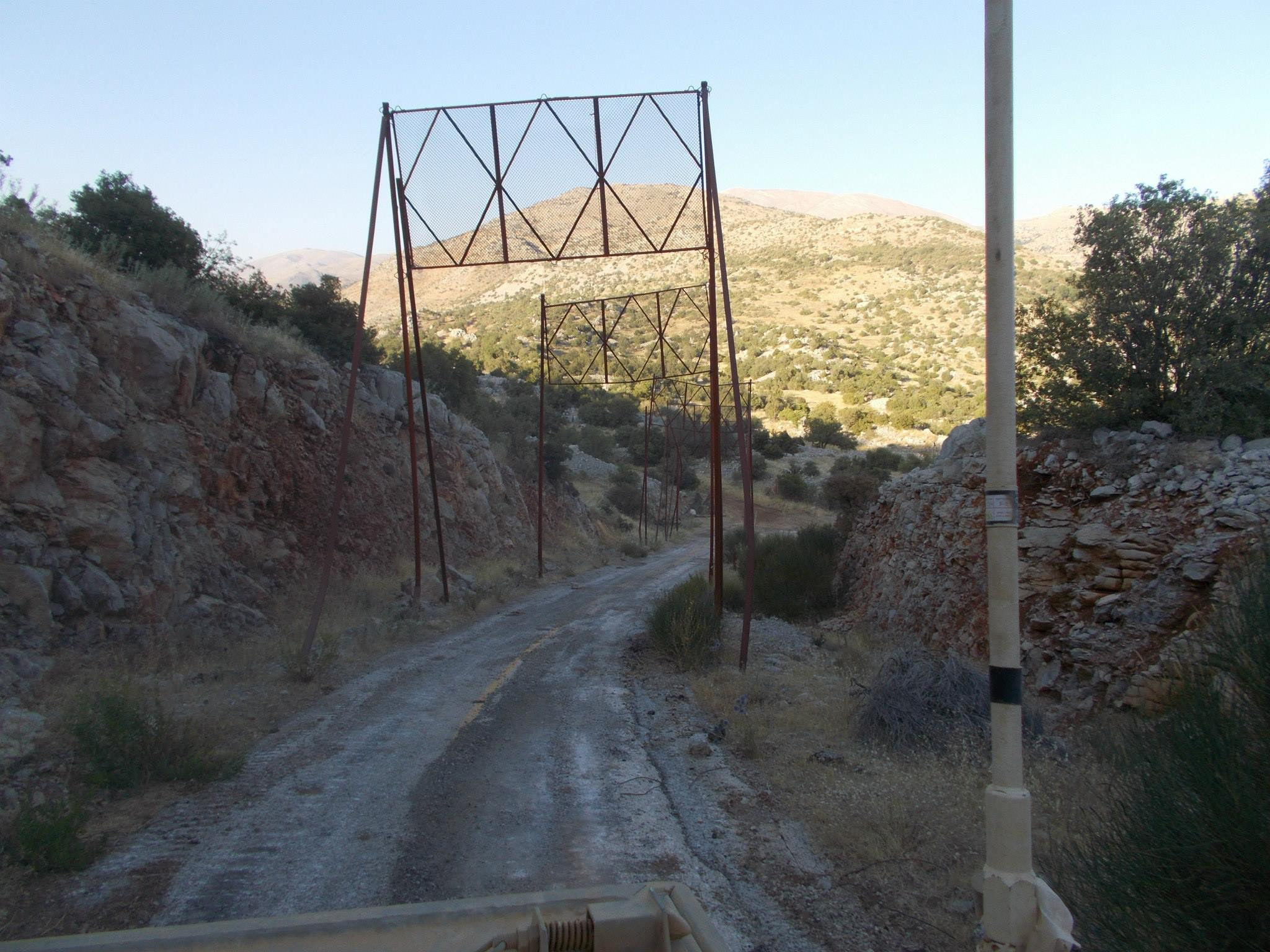
- Highway 999 on Mount Dov – looking northeast.

Route information
- Length: 29 km (18 mi)

Major junctions
- West end: Si'on Junction
- East end: The Lower Cable Car

Location
- Country: Israel

Highway system
- Roads in Israel; Highways
← Route 989

Route 999 is an east–west regional route in the northern Golan Heights, which Israel captured from Syria in the Six-Day War in 1967. Its access is restricted to Israeli army vehicles for almost its entire length. It begins from Si'on (Hebrew: שיאון, pronounced "see-OWN") adjacent to the community Snir and the village Ghajar, where it splits north from Highway 99. About 2 km after this junction stands an IDF checkpoint. After the checkpoint, the road moves in a northeast direction and climbs steeply on Shebaa farms in parallel with the international border between Golan Heights and Lebanon (the Blue Line). The road passes near the Shebaa farms while on its steep course in the Mount Hermon Nature Reserve. For the entire length of the road, IDF installations are standing, and it ends its length of 29 km with another IDF checkpoint near the Mount Hermon lower cable car, where it meets Highway 98.

Next to the road is Mount Betarim, on which a place is marked as the location where Abraham's covenant of the pieces occurred. The road offers views through all of southern Lebanon.

Before the withdrawal of IDF troops from the security zone in southern Lebanon in 2000, civilian transport on Route 999 in coordination with the IDF was permitted. However, after the withdrawal, the road served only for secure military traffic.

== Junctions (west to east) ==
District	Location	km	mi	Name	Destinations	Notes
Northern	Snir	0	0.0	צומת שיאון (Si'on Junction)	Highway 99	
Northern	Ghajar	2.2	1.4	צומת עג'ר (Ghajar Junction)	Road 9970	
Northern	Mount Hermon	29	18	הרכבל התחתון (The Lower Cable Car)	Highway 98	
1.000 mi = 1.609 km; 1.000 km = 0.621 mi

== See also ==
- List of highways in Israel
