= Highway 99 (Golan Heights and Israel) =

Highway in Israel

Coordinates: 33°14′46″N 35°40′00″E

Highway 99
- כביש 99
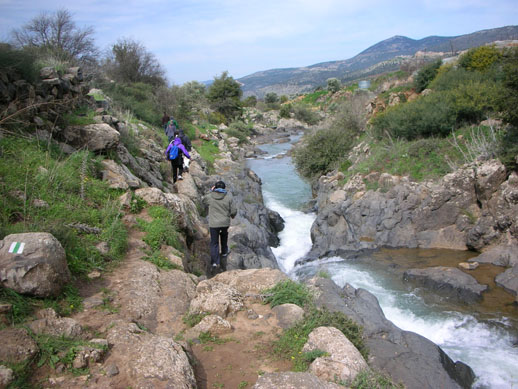
- Nahal Sa'ar near Highway 99

Route information
- Length: 24 km (15 mi)

Major junctions
- South end: HaMetzudot Junction
- North end: Mas'ade Junction

Location
- Country: Israel

Highway system
- Roads in Israel; Highways
← Highway 98	→ Route 109

Highway 99 is an east-west highway in the Finger of the Galilee in far northeast of Israel and the Golan Heights. It begins in the west at HaMetzodot junction in Kiryat Shmona, and it ends in the east at the Druze village of Mas'ade. After it reaches the Banias tributary, the road follows the path of Sa'ar River. Highway 99 is 24 km long.

== Junctions & Interchanges (West to East) ==
District	Location	km	mi	Name	Destinations	Notes
Northern	Kiryat Shmona	0	0.0	צומת המצודות (HaMetzudot Junction)	Highway 90	
Northern	HaGoshrim	4	2.5	מחלף הגושרים (HaGoshrim Interchange)	Entrance to HaGoshrim	
Northern	Hurshat Tal	5	3.1	צומת חורשת טל (Hurshat Tal Junction)	Route 918	
Northern	Snir	11	6.8	צומת שיאון (Si'on Junction)	Route 999	
Northern	Banias	14	8.7	צומת בניאס (Banias Junction)	Petroleum Road	
Northern	Sa'ar	17	11	צומת סער (Sa'ar Junction)	Route 989	
Northern	Mas'ade	24	15	צומת מסעדה (Mas'ade Junction)	Highway 98	
1.000 mi = 1.609 km; 1.000 km = 0.621 mi

== Places of interest near Highway 99 ==
- Hurshat Tal (חורשת טל)
- Tel Dan (שמורת תל דן)
- Nahal Snir (שמורת נחל שניר)
- Beit Osishkin Museum (מוזיאון בית אוסישקין)
- Banias (בניאס) archaeological site
- Waterfalls of Sa'ar River (נחל סער)
- Resisim Waterfall (מפל רסיסים)
- Odem Forest (יער אודם)
- Birkat Ram (ברכת רם)

== See also ==
- List of highways in Israel
