= Neve Ativ =

Israeli settlement in the Golan Heights

Neve Ativ: נווה אטי״ב (Hebrew)
- Moshav
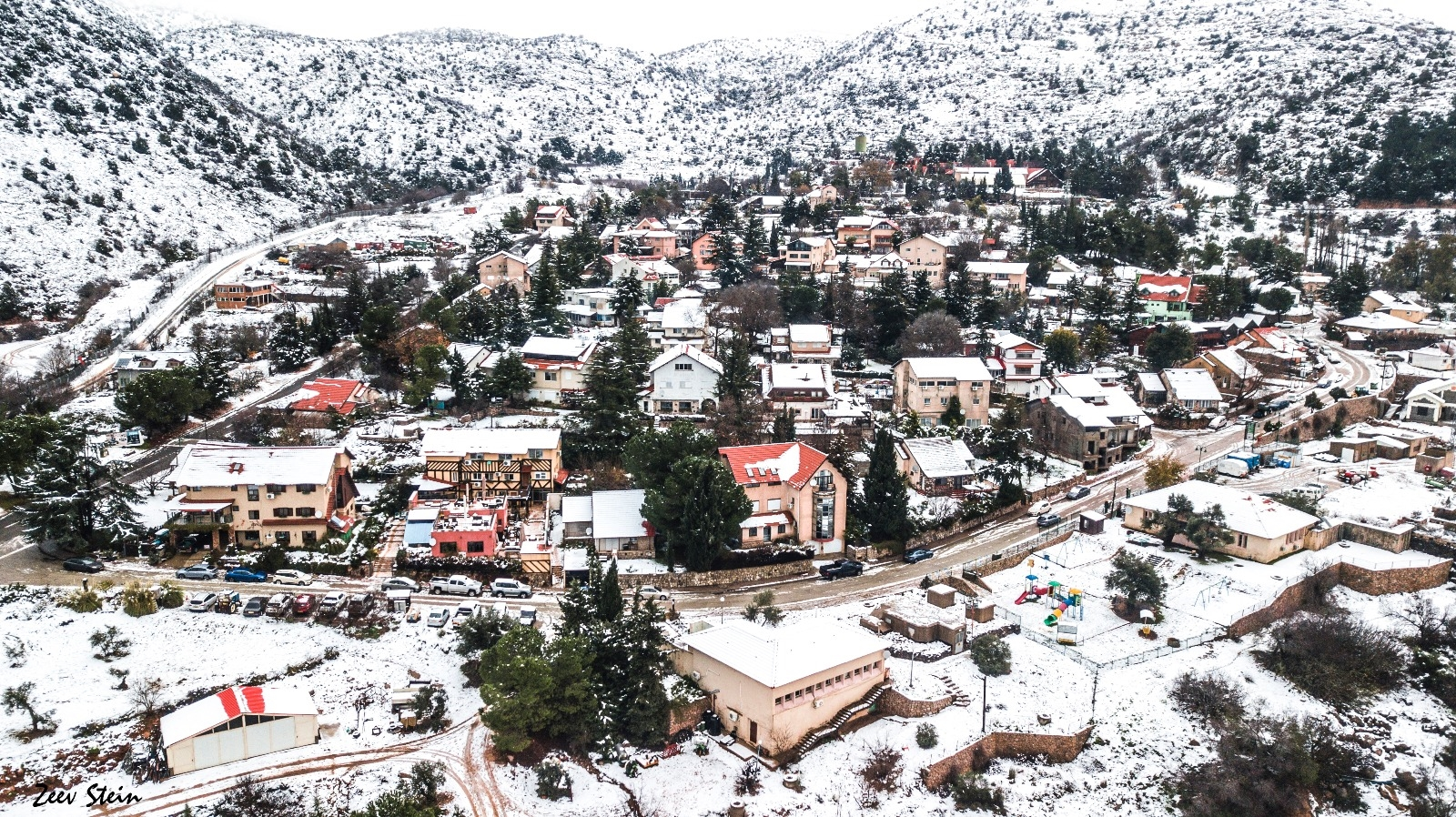
- View of Neve Ativ

- Location within the Golan Heights Location within the Golan Heights
- Coordinates: 33°15′42″N 35°44′28″E
- Country: Golan Heights (Internationally recognized as Syrian territory occupied by Israel.)
- District: Northern
- Subdistrict: Golan
- Council: Golan
- Affiliation: Agricultural Union
- Founded: 1972; 54 years ago
- Population (2024): 226
- Website: neve-ativ.org.il

Neve Ativ (Hebrew: נווה אטי״ב), is an Israeli settlement organized as a small Alpine-styled moshav in the Golan Heights. Its located on the slopes of Mount Hermon, 2 kilometers (1.2 mi) west of Majdal Shams. it falls under the jurisdiction of Golan Regional Council. In 2024 it had a population of 226.

The international community considers Israeli settlements in the Golan Heights illegal under international law, though the Israeli and United States governments dispute this.

== Etymology ==
The name Ativ is an acronym for four fallen soldiers from the Egoz Reconnaissance Unit killed in action in the Golan in 1968: Avraham Hameiri, Tuvia Ellinger, Yair Elegarnty, and Binyamin Hadad. Neve means Oasis.

== History ==
Israel and Syria fought major battles in the area in 1967 and 1973, and it remains a strategic military position. Neve Ativ was built on the land of the destroyed Syrian village of Jubata ez-Zeit. The Israeli settlement was founded in 1972, when the Golan region was a part of the Israeli Military Governorate, governed by military occupation system. In 1981, the area of Golan was unilaterally annexed by Israel.

In November 1996, a dining room in the settlement was set on fire and the walls on the building had "Down With the Occupation" and "The Golan Belongs to Syria" painted on them. Pro-Syrian Druze were believed to be behind it.

== Economy ==
The moshav's main industry is tourism. Since 1972, Neve Ativ has operated the nearby Mount Hermon ski resort, which has 25 kilometers (16 mi) of ski runs on the southern slopes of Mount Hermon. The resort was destroyed in the 1973 Yom Kippur War, but re-opened the following year.

== Transportation ==
The Golan Regional Council operates three buses per day from Neve Ativ to the Israeli city of Kiryat Shmona. The bus line begins at El Rom, and also stops at Buq'ata, Mas'ade, and Majdal Shams. The bus ride to Kiryat Shmona takes approximately 22 minutes. Neve Ativ is located along Highway 989, which connects it to nearby Majdal Shams.
