= Jubata ez-Zeit =

Jubata ez-Zeit جباتا الزيت
- Jubata ez-Zeit in Syria
- Coordinates: 33°15′N 35°44′E
- Grid position: 218/295 PAL
- Country: Syria
- Governorate: Quneitra
- District: Quneitra
- Subdistrict: Mas'ade
- Region: Golan Heights
- Destroyed: 1967
- Elevation: 979 m (3,212 ft)

Population (1967)
  - Total: 1,500−2,000 (individual estimate)

Jubata ez-Zeit (Arabic: جباتا الزيت, Jubātā az-Zayt) was a Syrian village situated in the Golan Heights. According to an Arab resident of a nearby town, it had a population of around 1,500 to 2,000 people prior to the forced expulsion of the town's residents in 1968.

== Etymology ==
Jubata ez-Zeit is an Arabic name that translates into English as "olive oil pit," and refers to the olive trees that grew in the village which remain present today.

== History ==
=== 19th century ===
In 1810, Johann Ludwig Burckhardt visited the village and wrote:

"... One hour more brought us to the village of Djoubeta, where we remained during the night at the house of some friends of the Sheikh of Banias. This village belongs to Hasbeya; it is inhabited by about fifty Turkish and ten Greek families; they subsist chiefly by the cultivation of olives, and by the rearing of cattle. I was well treated at the house where we alighted, and also at that of the Sheikh of the village, where I went to drink a cup of coffee. It being Ramadan, we passed the greater part of the night in conversation and smoking; the company grew merry, and knowing that I was curious about ruined places, began to enumerate all the villages and ruins in the neighbourhood, of which I subjoin the names.* The neighbouring mountains of the Heish abound in tigers (نمورة nimoura); their skins are much esteemed by the Arab Sheikhs as saddle cloths. There are also bears, wolves, and stags; the wild boar is met with in all the mountains which I visited in my tour."

In 1838, Eli Smith noted Jubata ez-Zeit's population as Sunni Muslims and Antiochian Greek Christians.

=== 1967 and aftermath ===
About half of the residents of Jubat ez-Zeit fled during the fighting in the Six-Day War of June 1967. The remaining half were expelled from the Golan Heights by the Israeli Army after the war. Israeli soldiers forced the civilians of the village to flee by shooting at them. Disabled people still in the village were put on donkeys by the Israelis and escorted out of the Golan. The village was later demolished. The Jubata ez-Zeit mosque was initially spared. One year after the war, in 1968, the area was declared a closed military zone. The mosque was ultimately destroyed around 1970.

In the early 1970s, the Israeli settlement of Neve Ativ was built on the site of the former village.

== Geography ==
Jubata ez-Zeit was located in the lower, eastern ridges of Jabal esh-Sheikh. Wadi Jubbata passes below it, and runs to the north of Nimrod castle toward Banias.

== Notable residents ==
- Marwan Habash (born 1938), Syrian Baath Party politician and writer

== See also ==
- Syrian towns and villages depopulated in the Arab-Israeli conflict
