= Kiryat Shmona =

Kiryat Shmona קריית שמונה (Hebrew)
- City
- Kiryat Shemona

Hebrew transcription(s)
  - ISO 259: Kiryat Šmona
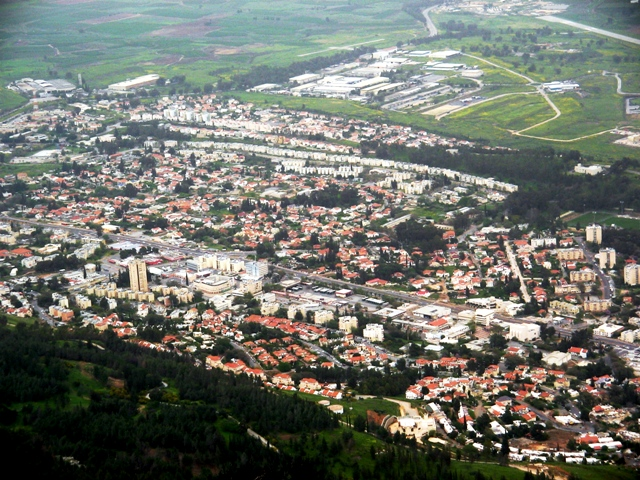
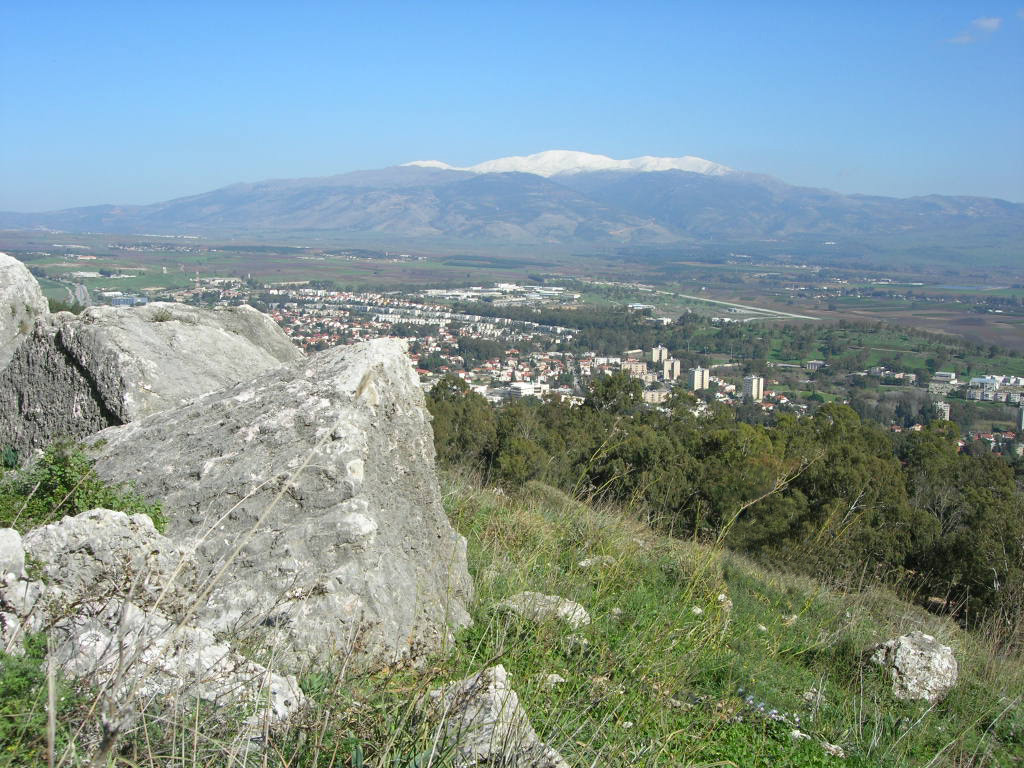
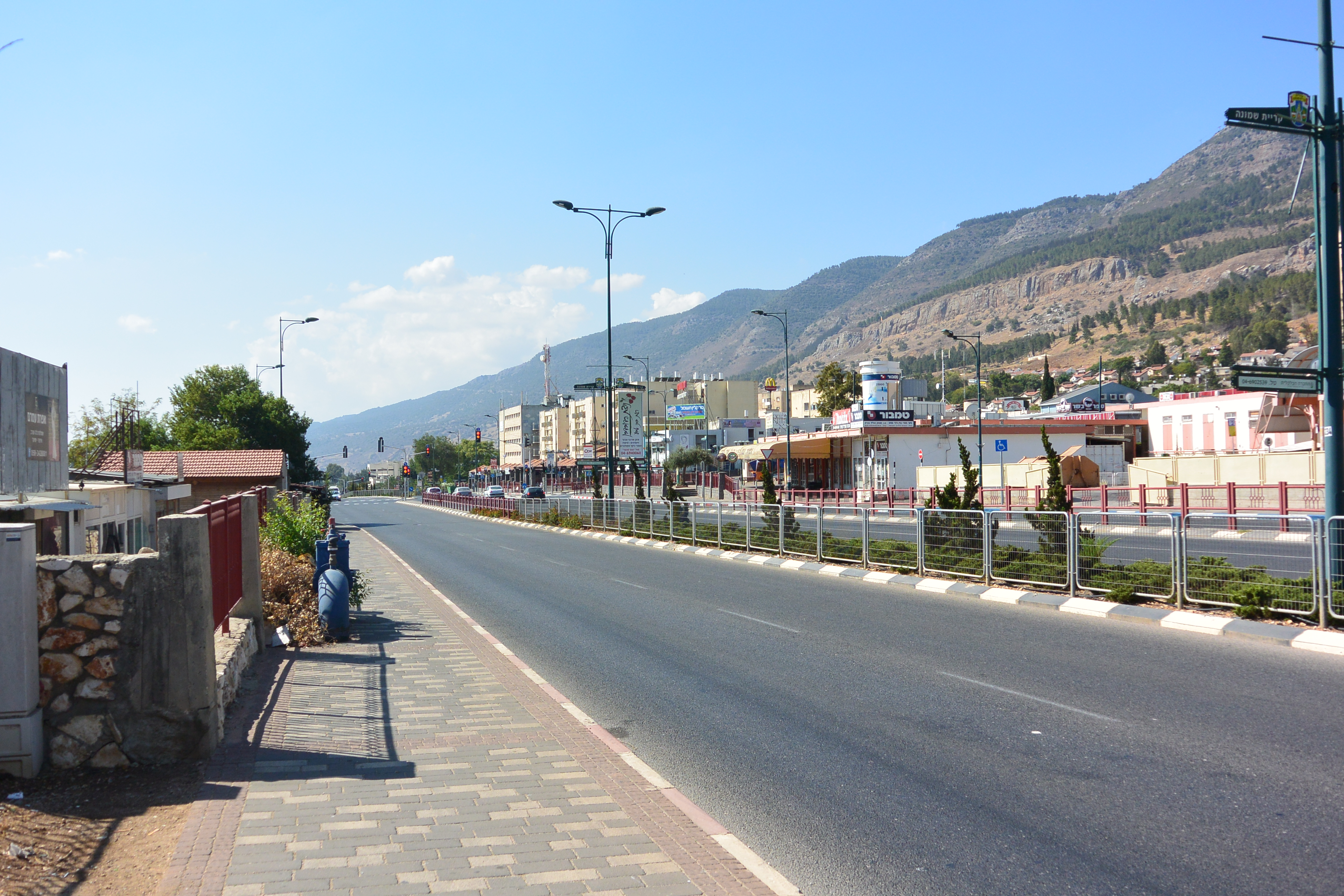
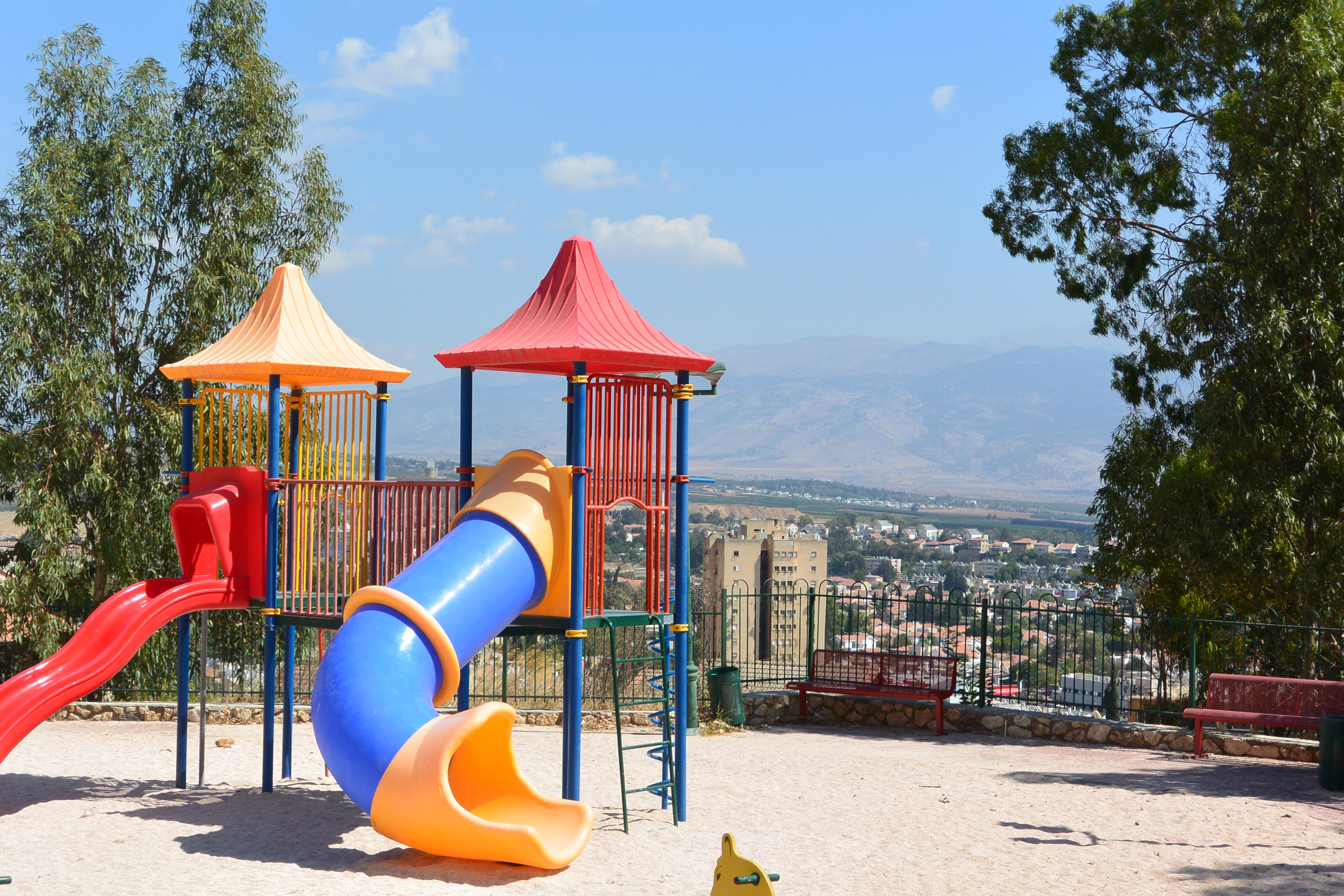
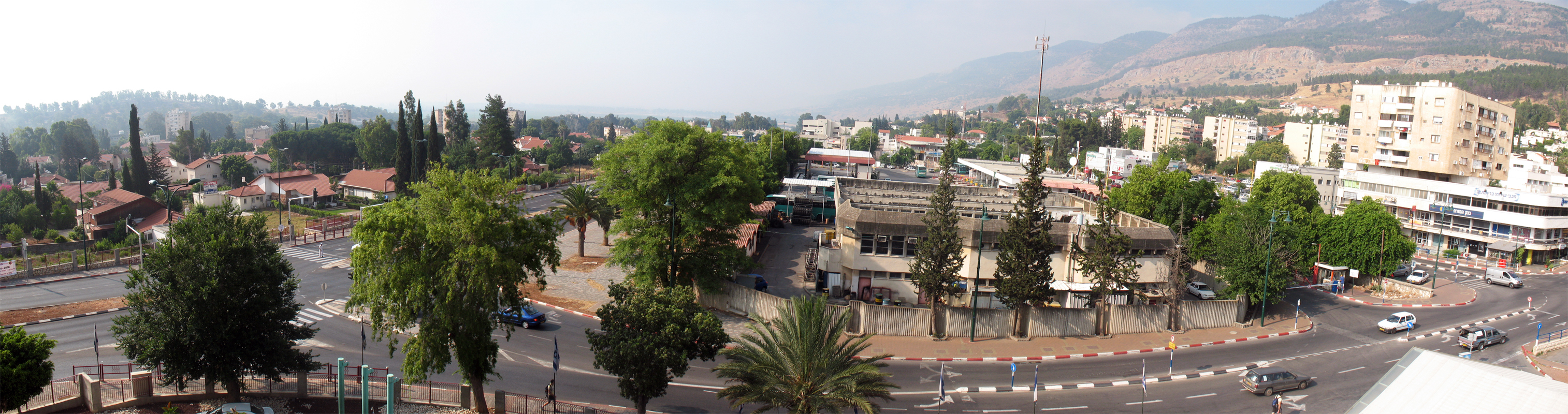

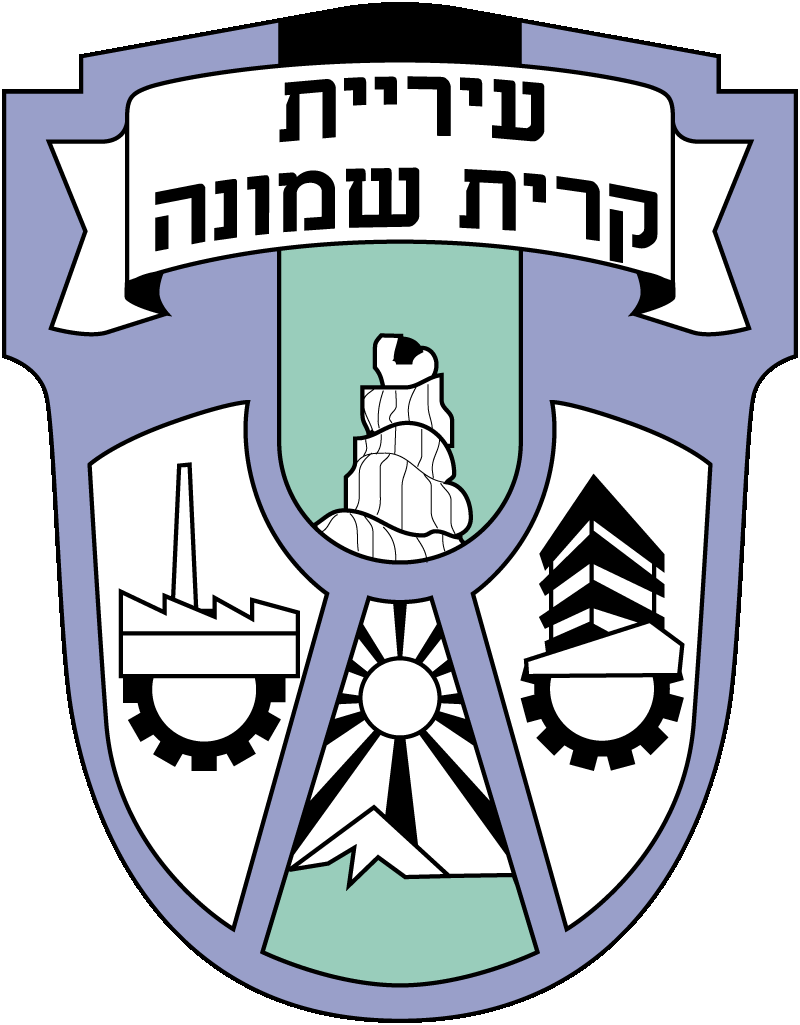
- Coat of arms

- Location within Northeast Israel Location within Israel
- Coordinates: 33°12′27″N 35°34′11″E
- Country: Israel
- District: Northern
- Subdistrict: Safed
- Natural Region: Hula Valley
- Founded: 1949; 77 years ago

Government
  - Type: Mayor–council
  - Body: Municipality of Kiryat Shmona
  - Mayor: Avihay Shtern (Likud)

Area
  - Total: 9,960 dunams (9.96 km^{2}; 3.85 sq mi)

Population (2024)
  - Total: 24,437
  - Density: 2,450/km^{2} (6,350/sq mi)

Ethnicity
  - Jews and others: 96.7%
  - Arabs: 3.3%
- Time zone: UTC+2 (IST)
  - Summer (DST): UTC+3 (IDT)
- Postal code: 12100
- Name meaning: City of the Eight
- Website: k-8.co.il

Kiryat Shmona (Hebrew: קריית שמונה, lit. 'City of the Eight', Arabic: كريات شمونة) is a city in the Northern District of Israel on the western slopes of the Hula Valley near the Lebanese border.

In 2024, it had a population of 24,437. Located near the Israel–Lebanon border, Kiryat Shmona is Israel's northernmost city.

== Etymology ==
Kiryat Shmona was named after eight Jewish militiamen, commanded by Joseph Trumpeldor, who had fallen in the 1920 Battle of Tel Hai during the Franco-Syrian War adjacent to the new town. It had originally been named Kiryat Yosef for Trumpeldor before the name was changed to Kiryat Shmona in June 1950.

== History ==
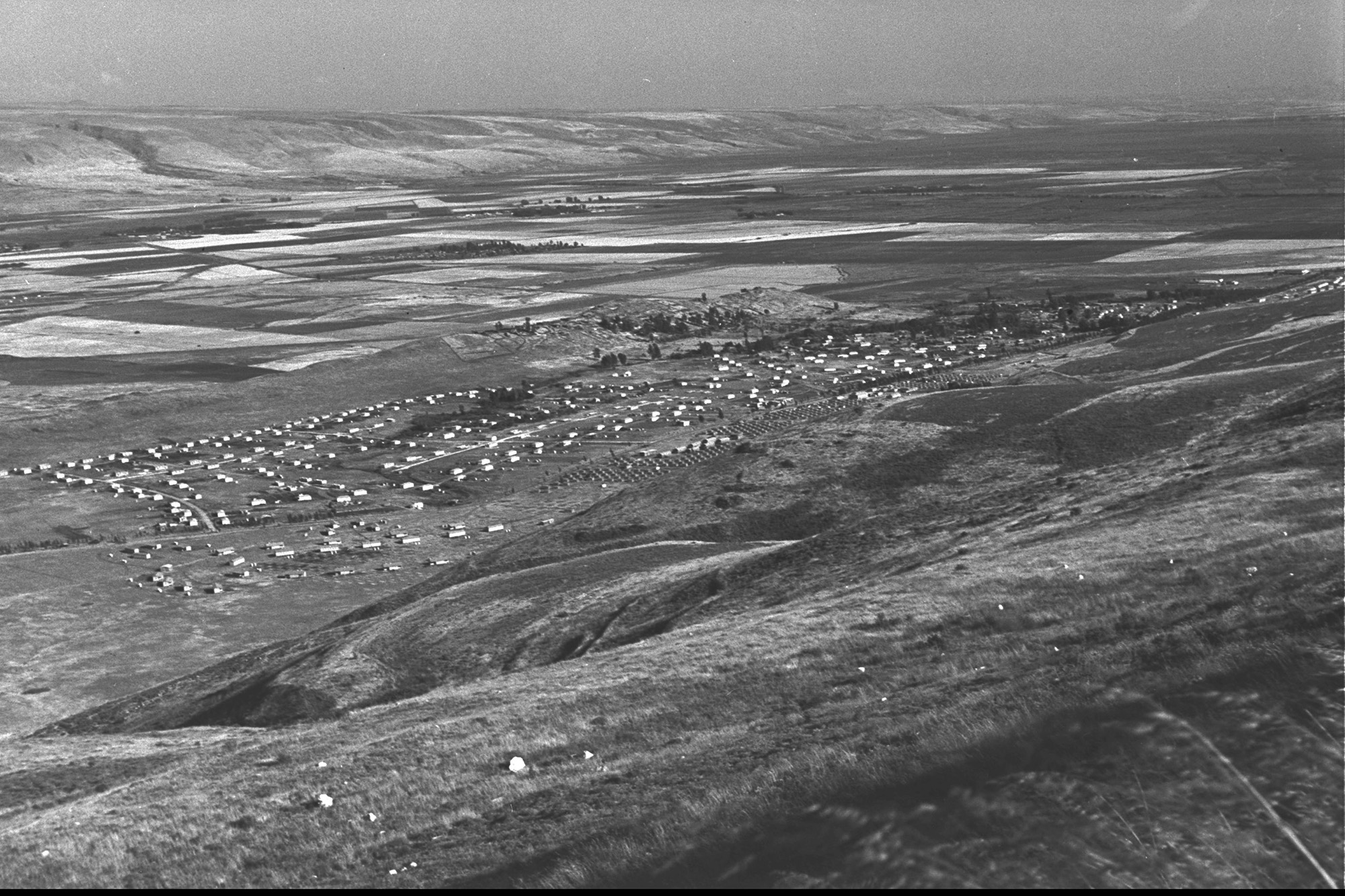
Kiryat Shmona in 1955

Kiryat Shmona was established in 1949 on the site of the former depopulated Palestinian Arab village of Al-Khalisa, whose inhabitants fled after Safed was taken by the Haganah during the 1948 Arab–Israeli War and an attempt by the village to come to an agreement with the Jewish authorities was rejected.

Initially, the area was used as a transit camp for immigrants who worked mainly in farming. The first residents were fourteen Yemenite Jews who arrived on July 18, 1949, and were followed by more Yemenis a month later. By July 1951, the population had grown to nearly 4,000. Relationships with nearby kibbutzim were often strained.

In 1953, Kiryat Shmona was declared a development town. In the first few years, growth was driven by the arrival of immigrants from Romania and India, as well as Jews forced to leave Iraq and Iran, following Israel’s military victory over invading Arab armies in the War of Independence. Additionally, Kurdish immigrants from the Iraqi and Iranian areas of Kurdistan arrived. Later, additional waves of immigrant Jews forcibly expelled from North Africa, in particular from Morocco after Israel's independence, arrived. The city was built without a master plan, but rather neighborhood by neighborhood as waves of immigrants arrived.

=== Security Incidents ===
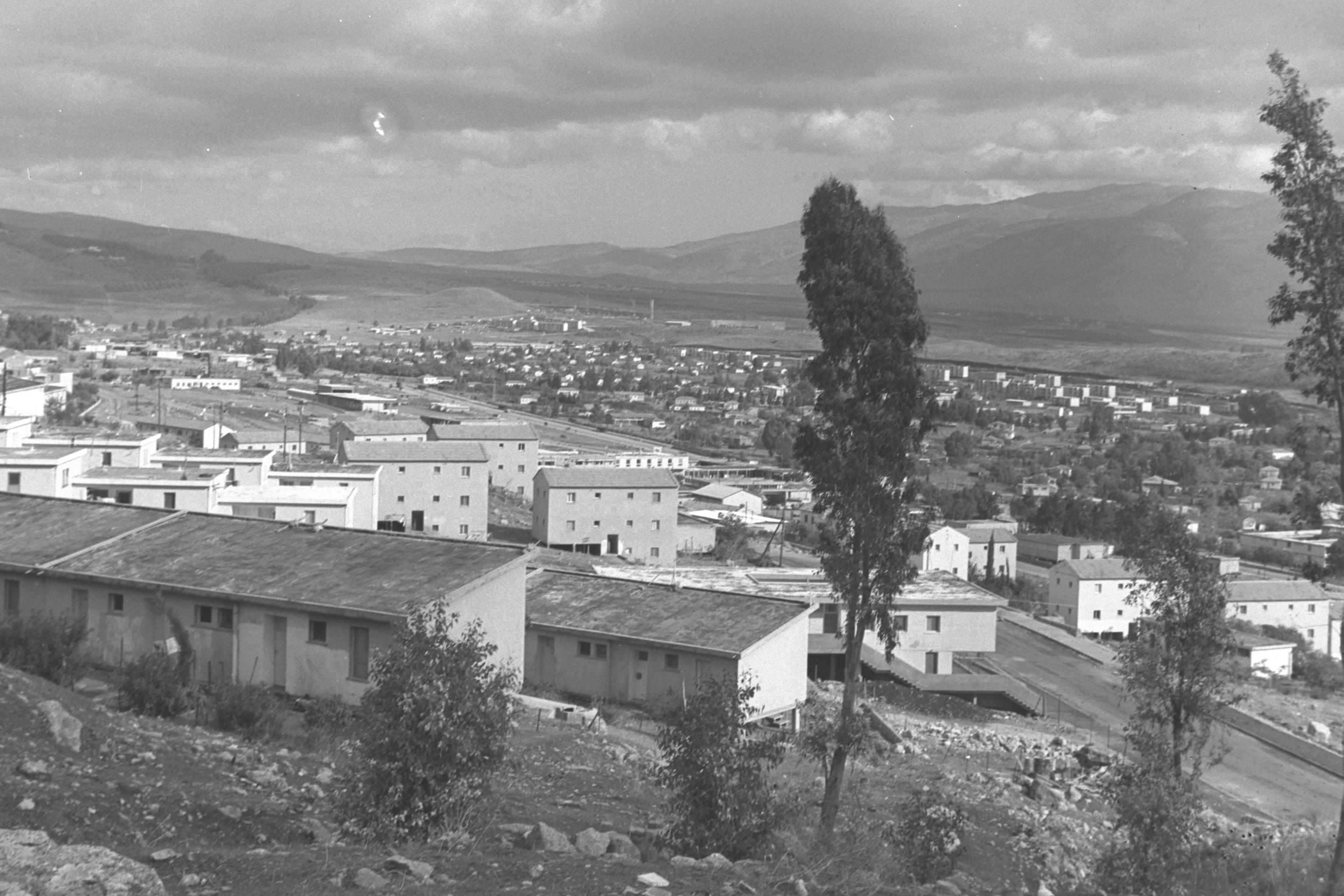
Kiryat Shmona in 1964

Kiryat Shmona's location close in proximity to the Lebanese border, makes it a target for terrorist cross-border attacks by invasion or missiles.

On April 11, 1974, the Popular Front for the Liberation of Palestine – General Command (PFLP-GC), sent three militants across the border from Lebanon to Kiryat Shmona. They killed eighteen residents of an apartment building, including many children, before being killed in an exchange of fire at the complex, which became known as the Kiryat Shmona massacre.

The city continued to be the target of attacks, including Katyusha rocket attacks by the Palestine Liberation Organization (PLO) in July 1981, a Katyusha rocket attack by the PLO in March 1986 (killing a teacher and injuring four students and one adult), and further Katyusha rocket attacks by Hezbollah during 1996's Operation Grapes of Wrath.

On 24−25 June 1999, two residents were killed when Hezbollah fired a salvo of Katyusha rockets into the centre of Kiryat Shimona. They were the first fatalities in a cross border attack since 1995. In spite of attacks from Lebanon, the population grew from 11,800 in 1972 to 15,100 in 1983.

In 2000–2006, the locals enjoyed relative peace but suffered from loud explosions every few weeks because of Hezbollah anti-aircraft cannons fired at Israeli Air Force (IAF) planes flying across the Israeli-Lebanese border.

==== During Hezbollah's wars on Israel ====
During the 2006 Lebanon War, the city was again the target of Katyusha rocket attacks. Most of the city's residents left the area during the war, and the 5,000 who remained stayed in bomb shelters, turning the city into a ghost town. During the war, a total of 1,012 Katyusha rockets hit Kiryat Shmona.

In the beginning of the Gaza war in October 2023, the city was evacuated due to attacks by Hezbollah and Palestinian factions from Southern Lebanon. During the war, there were 129 siren alerts throughout the city: 13 in the first month of the war, 15 in the second month, and 18 in the third month.

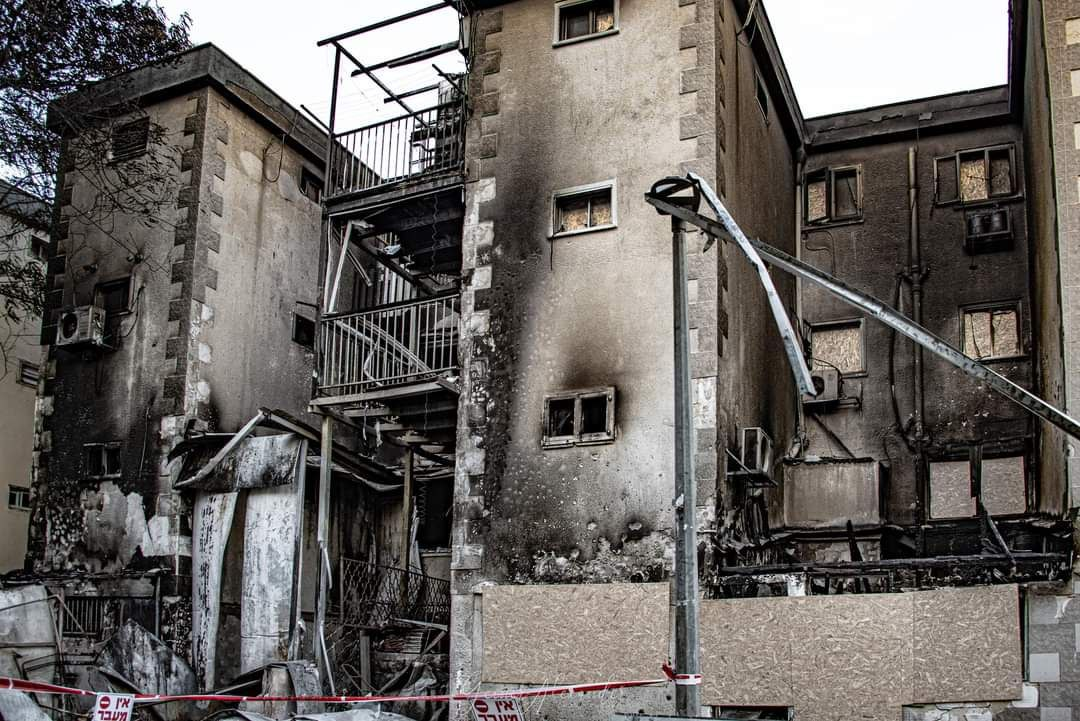
Buildings in Kiryat Shmona after a Hezbollah attacks during the Gaza war

The Hezbollah attacks caused damage to Israeli infrastructure and fires that decimated the area. Nearly all of Kiryat Shmona's inhabitants were evacuated to other areas of Israel as a result of the terrorist attacks, with about 2,000 residents remaining in the city as of July 2024. Hezbollah attacks damaged 383 buildings and killed two people. Following the Israeli invasion of Lebanon and subsequent ceasefire, some residents began to return To Kiryat Shmona. However, as of late February, 2025, an estimated 80% of the residents of Kiryat Shimona who were forced from their homes by Hezbollah rockets remained scattered in safer locations elsewhere across the country.

== Geography ==
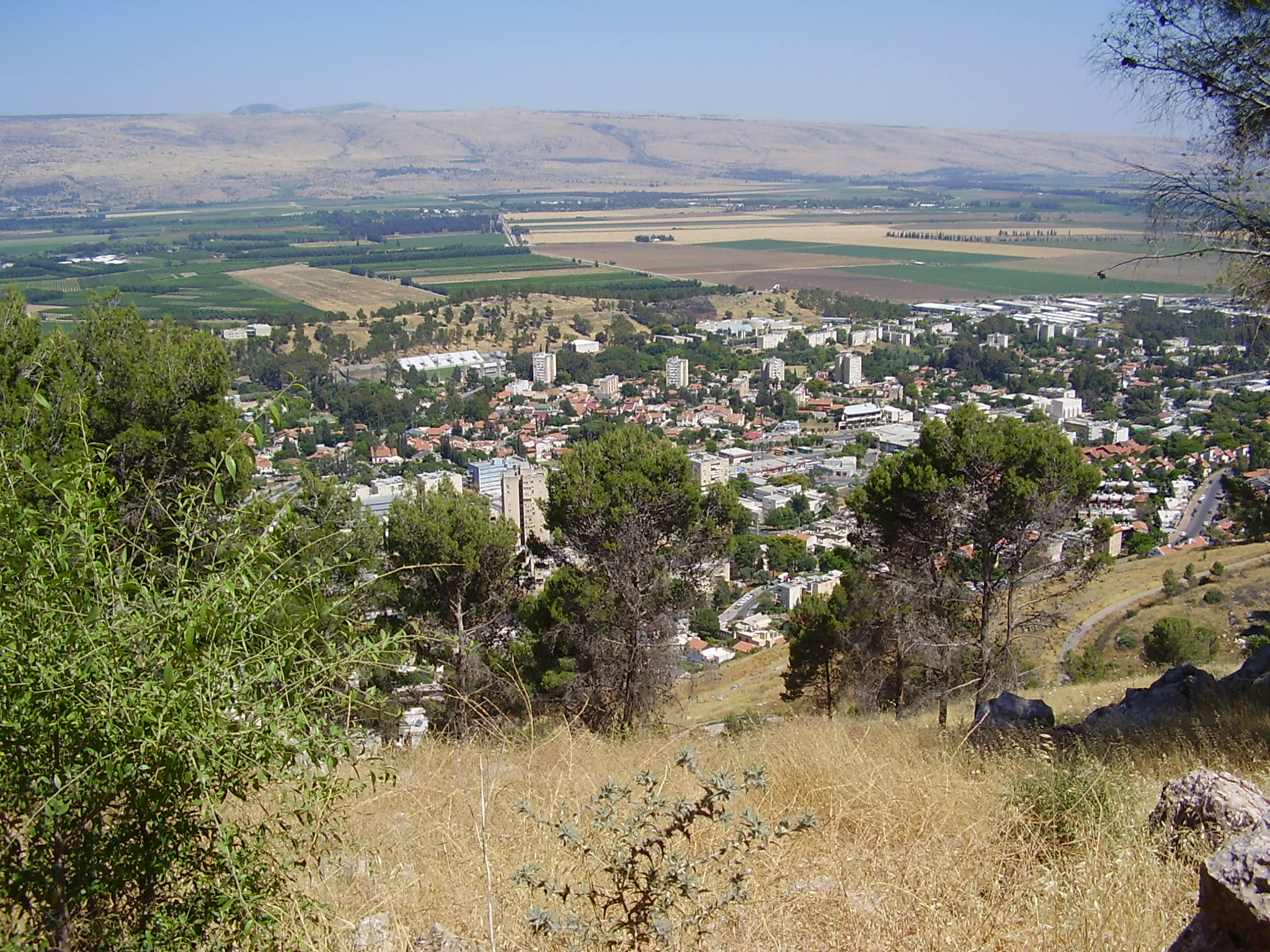
View of Kiryat Shemona from Naftali Mountains in the Upper Galilee

Kiryat Shmona is located in the Galilee panhandle next to Hula Valley, about 5 kilometres (3 miles) south and 2 km (1 mile) east of the Israel–Lebanon border. Its elevation is about 150 metres (492 feet) above sea level.

The city is located above the Dead Sea Transform fault, and as a result, is one of the cities in Israel most at risk to earthquakes (along with Safed, Beit She'an, Tiberias, and Eilat).

=== Climate ===
Kiryat Shmona has a mediterranean climate (Köppen: Csa) with hot, dry summers and mildly cool and rainy winters.

Climate data for Kiryat Shmona
Month	Jan	Feb	Mar	Apr	May	Jun	Jul	Aug	Sep	Oct	Nov	Dec	Year
Mean daily maximum °C (°F)	14.5 (58.1)	16 (61)	19 (66)	22.5 (72.5)	26.5 (79.7)	29.3 (84.7)	31.3 (88.3)	31.6 (88.9)	30.1 (86.2)	27.3 (81.1)	21.9 (71.4)	16.7 (62.1)	23.9 (75.0)
Daily mean °C (°F)	9.4 (48.9)	10.6 (51.1)	13.3 (55.9)	16.6 (61.9)	20.5 (68.9)	23.5 (74.3)	25.4 (77.7)	25.5 (77.9)	24 (75)	21.1 (70.0)	15.7 (60.3)	11.2 (52.2)	18.1 (64.5)
Mean daily minimum °C (°F)	4.9 (40.8)	5.5 (41.9)	7.6 (45.7)	10.3 (50.5)	14 (57)	17.4 (63.3)	19.8 (67.6)	20.2 (68.4)	18.5 (65.3)	15.6 (60.1)	10.5 (50.9)	6.6 (43.9)	12.6 (54.6)
Average rainfall mm (inches)	129 (5.1)	127 (5.0)	95 (3.7)	52 (2.0)	22 (0.9)	5 (0.2)	2 (0.1)	2 (0.1)	7 (0.3)	28 (1.1)	67 (2.6)	111 (4.4)	647 (25.5)
Average relative humidity (%)	75	73	68	64	59	58	61	65	63	61	61	70	65
Source: Climate-Data.org

== Demographics ==
Historical population
Year	Pop.	±%
1972	15,400	—
1983	15,600	+1.3%
1995	19,000	+21.8%
2008	23,200	+22.1%
2022	23,083	−0.5%
2024	24,437	+5.9%

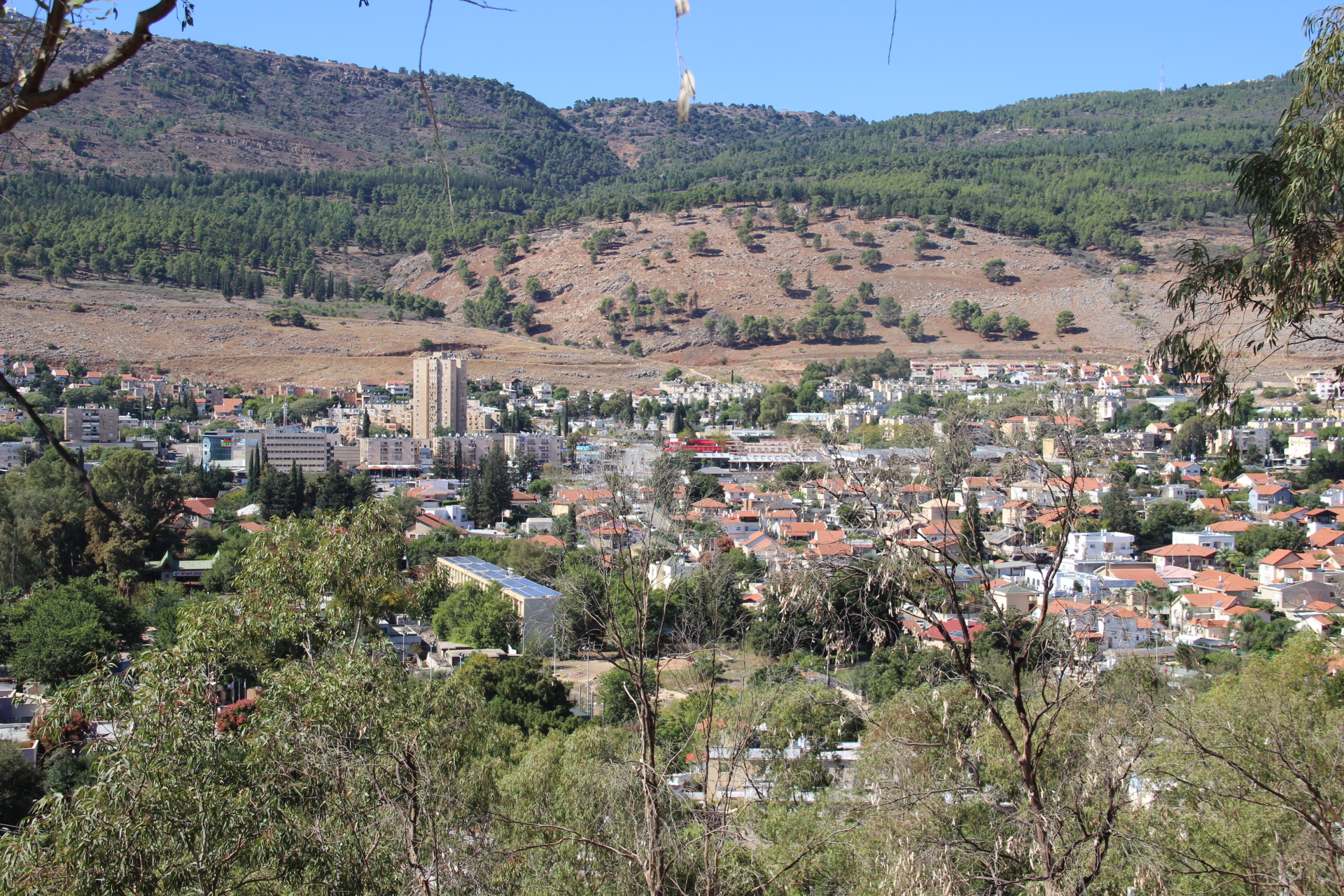
Neighborhood in Kiryat Shmona

According to Israel Central Bureau of Statistics (CBS), in 2001 the ethnic makeup of the city was 97.9% Jewish. In 2001 there were 121 immigrants. The Jewish population of the town is largely of Sephardi and Mizrahi heritage, and many are industrial workers employed in local small industry and in neighboring kibbutzim. In 2022, 92.3 of the population was Jewish and 7.7% was counted as other.

According to CBS, in 2001 there were 10,800 males and 10,700 females. The age range of the city population was 33.5% 19 years of age or younger, 19.8% between 20 and 29, 19.3% between 30 and 44, 15.3% from 45 to 59, 3.5% from 60 to 64, and 8.5% 65 years of age or older. The population growth rate in 2001 was 1.8%.

=== Health ===
Kiryat Shmona has an urgent care clinic with an emergency room that serves the city and nearby communities. It provides services in the areas of surgery, internal medicine, orthopedics, trauma, neurology, gynecology, and psychiatry. There are also a few outpatient clinics located in the city.

=== Education ===
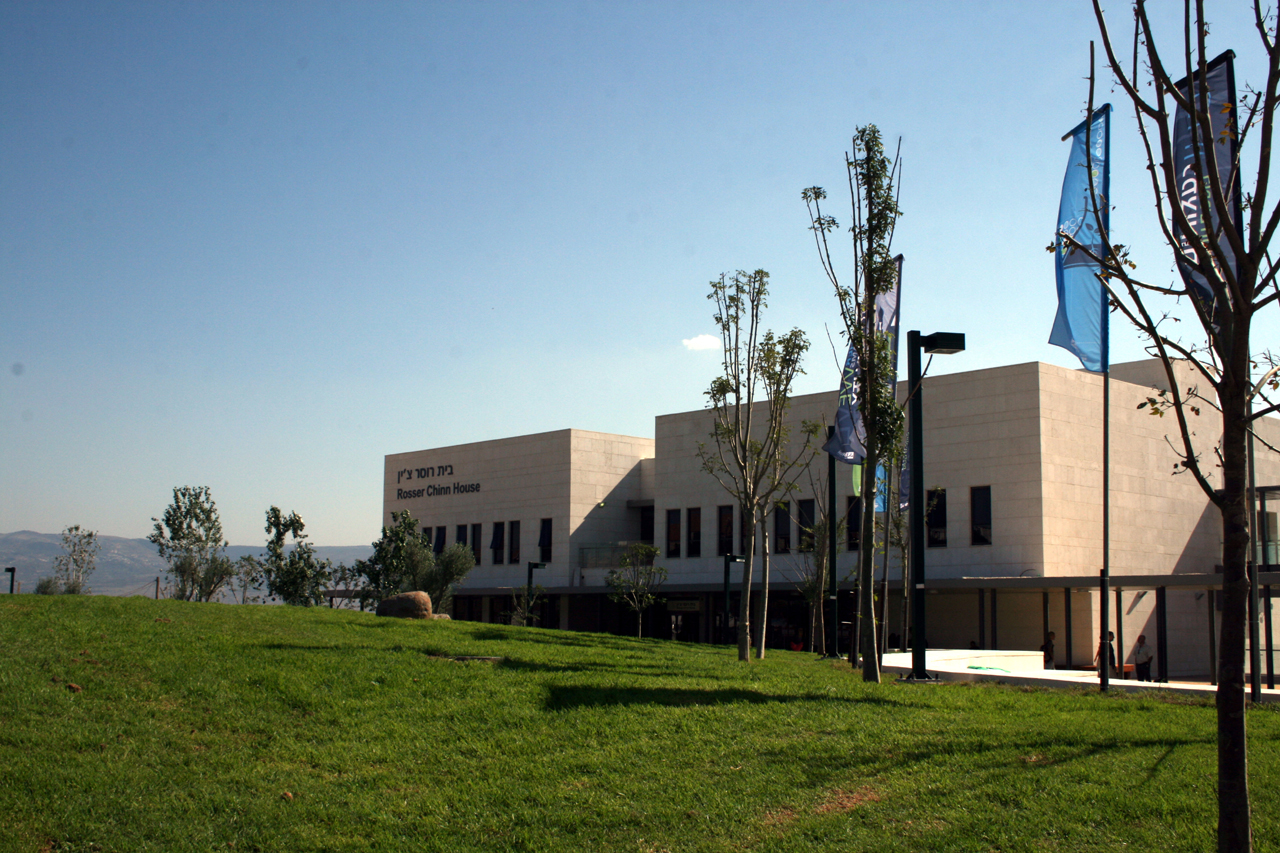
Tel-Hai Academic College

According to CBS, there are 12 schools and 4,339 students in the city. They are spread out, as 9 elementary schools and 2,355 elementary school students, and 6 high schools and 1,984 high school students. 49.3% of 12th grade students were entitled to a matriculation certificate in 2001. In 2023 the total number of students dropped to 3,767, and the percentage of students entitled to a matriculation certificate rose to 71.8%.

The Tel-Hai Academic College is a college located near kibbutz Kfar Giladi and north of Kiryat Shmona. The college offers academic and continuing education programs for approximately 4,500 students, 70 percent of whom come from outside the Galilee. Minorities comprise about 10 percent of the student body. The college offers degrees in life sciences, social sciences, computer science and the humanities.

Rabbi Zephaniah Drori serves as the Chief Rabbi of Kiryat Shmona as well as heading the Kiryat Shmona Hesder Yeshivah.

== Economy ==
According to CBS, as of 2000, in the city there were 8,303 salaried workers and 467 are self-employed. The mean monthly wage in 2000 for a salaried worker in the city is 4,306 shekels, a real change of 4.6% over the course of 2000. Salaried males have a mean monthly wage of 5,443 shekels (a real change of 7.1%) versus 3,065 shekels for females (a real change of −2.2%). The mean income for the self-employed is 6,769. There are 564 people who receive unemployment benefits and 1,655 people who receive an income guarantee.

The economy is based on consumer-oriented products such as communications, information technology, and electronics as well as agriculture on the surrounding lands and tourism.

== Tourism ==
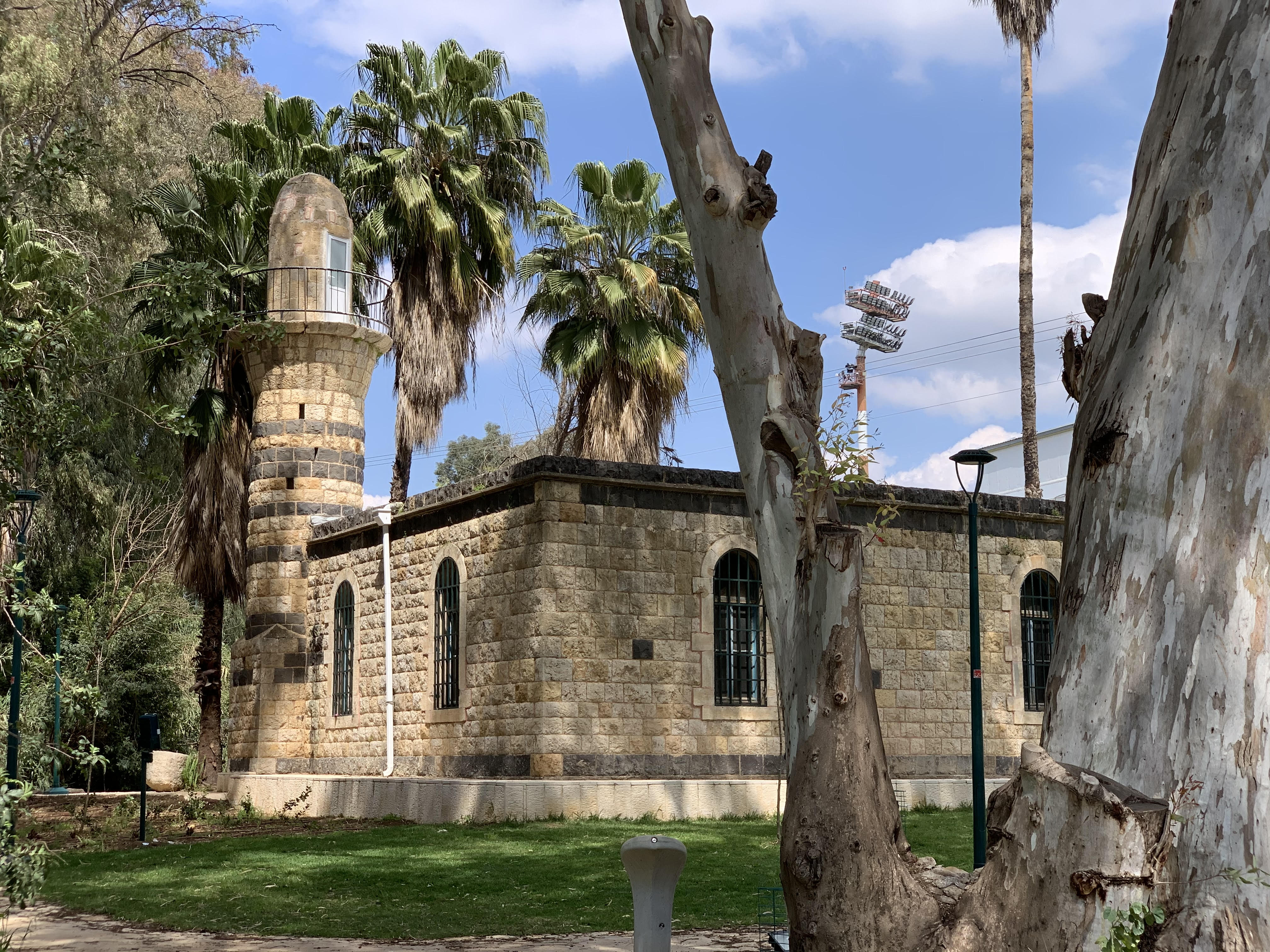
Kiryat Shmona Museum, formerly the Al-Khalisa mosque

The town had a now-defunct a cable car link with Manara above in the Naftali mountain range and also is home to an activity center and toboggan run located in the south of the town.

In the residential area there is an urban natural space called Park HaZahav. Zahav means "gold" in Hebrew; the park is named after the stream running through it, the Ein Zahav Stream. Park HaZahav covers 11 hectares in the middle of Kiryat Shmona. It comprises many diverse natural resources. In addition to intensive activity areas designated for leisure and play, and open to all, the park contains a diverse, protected, natural area comprising Ein Zahav Stream and HaTachanot Stream (Tachanot refers to two water mills [tachana=mill] which were active along this stream in the past), which flow through the middle of the park. These streams have created different aquatic habitats, including shallow sections, rapids, deep sections and pools that support diverse riparian vegetation that has developed with time into a riparian forest, an uncommon phenomenon in Israel. The park has a trail that goes through the forest and along the stream. Included in the park are different gardening initiatives by local volunteers, a picnic area, and a playground.

== Sports ==
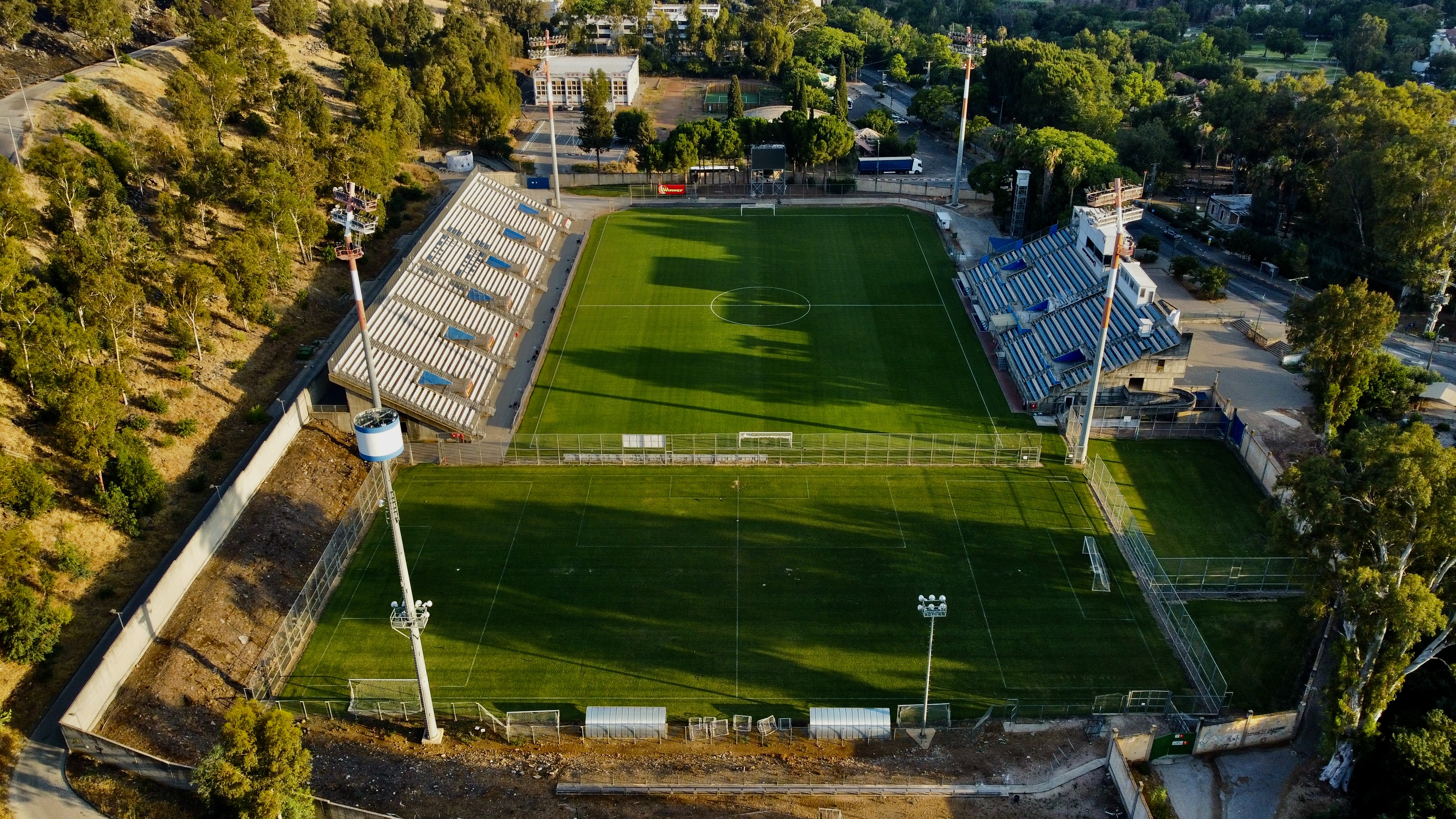
Kiryat Shmona Stadium

While Kiryat Shmona is one of the smaller cities in Israel, the local football club, Hapoel Ironi Kiryat Shmona is top flight. It was formed formed by a merger of Hapoel Kiryat Shmona and Maccabi Kiryat Shmona in 2000. The club was promoted to the top division for the first time at the end of the 2006–07 season, and won the Israeli Premier League Championship in 2011–2012.

The town is home to one of the 14 Israel Tennis Centers (ITC). These Centers throughout Israel teach children life skills through tennis. The Centers are primarily funded through donations. The Israel Children's Centers in the United States, and the Canada Israel Children's Centres are largely responsible for the funding of the Tennis Centers, which strive to never turn a child away due to financial need.

== Transportation ==
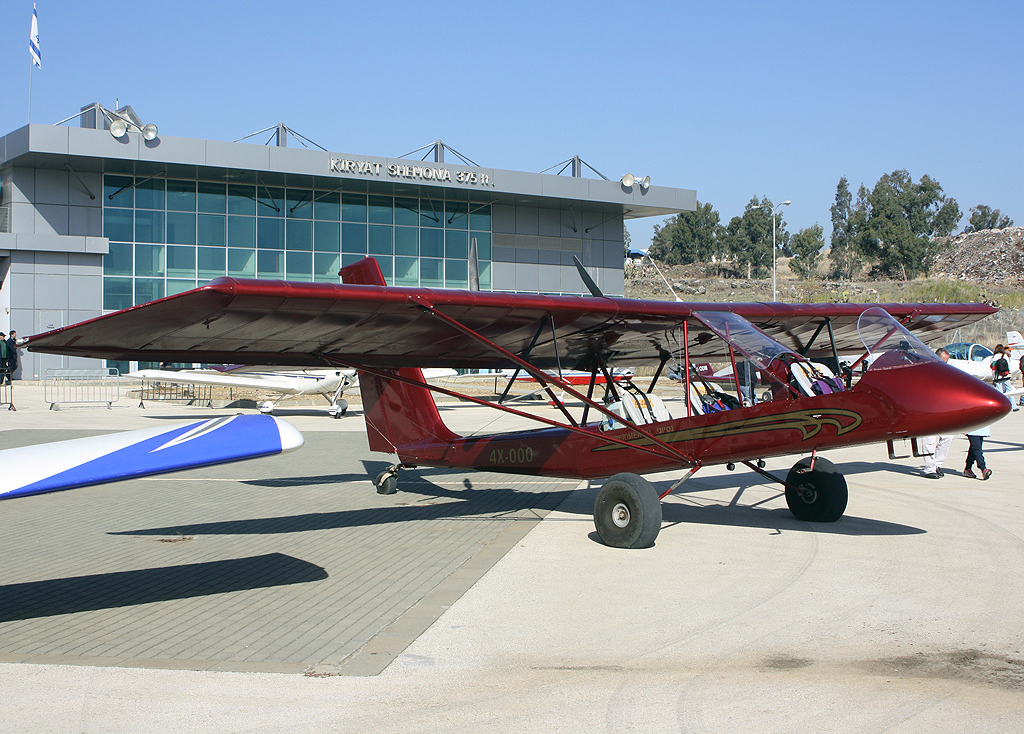
Kiryat Shmona Airport

Kiryat Shmona is located at the junction of two major national highways, Highway 90 and Highway 99. Kiryat Shmona is located near the Northern terminus of the North-South Highway 90. Highway 90, "Israel's longest road", connects Eilat in the extreme south of the Country, running along Jordan Valley and the Dead Sea, running through the West Bank, to Kiryat Shmona in the northern extreme. The highway terminates about 8 km further north, at the Lebanese border at the town of Metula. Highway 99, Israel's northern-most East-West Highway, starts from Kiryat Shmona and travels East, into the Golan Heights. The highway passes through Banias, and connects to the Druze town of Mas'ade. The highway also serves an important tourist function, as it provides access for Israelis to winter sport facilities at the slopes of Mount Hermon.

The Egged Bus Company provides services along 26 inner city bus routes in Kiryat Shmona. Egged Bus Company, along with Nateev Express, connect Kiryat Shmona to the surrounding Jewish and Arab localities. "Golan Public Transport" connects Kiryat Shmona to Jewish and Druze localities in the Golan Heights. Egged Bus Company also provides long-distance services to cities such as Tel Aviv and Jerusalem in the center of the country.

Currently, Kiryat Shmona is not served by Israel Railways or any other rail transport. There is an approved project to extend the Acre-Karmiel passenger rail line to Safed and Kiryat Shmona. The finalized plan was submitted for review in June 2022. The rail line will connect Kiryat Shmona to Safed (Tzahar), Karmiel, Haifa, and further south to the economic and population core of the Country at Gush Dan (Greater Tel Aviv). The rail line project itself has been the subject of criticism. One criticism involves accusation of discrimination in planning against Arab citizens of Israel, specifically that despite being a rail line in the Galilee, a region where more than half the population are Arab, no stations that will serve any of the Arab localities of the region is proposed. The same situation exists along the existing Acre-Karmiel portion of the line. Furthermore, residents of Arab villages along the path of the railway line, specifically residents of the village of Nahf, charge that the proposed route of the railway line to Kiryat Shmona will result either in confiscation, or in imposition of a construction ban on 10% of the land area of the village, a village that is overcrowded and has a limited development space as it is. In addition, there are also criticisms with respect to the proposed placement of Kiryat Shmona Train Station. The station is proposed to be located outside of the urban area of the city, along local road "9779". A large parking space is proposed for the station as well. However, critics state that the location of the station will force the residents to either continue to rely on their private vehicles, or to the inconvenience of waiting for urban bus lines as opposed to simply walking.

== Voting Patterns ==
In the 2022 election, 75 percent of voters in Kiryat Shmona voted for the parties of the right-wing coalition led by Benjamin Netanyahu, while 23 percent voted for the parties of the center-left coalition led by Yair Lapid and 0.2 percent voted for the Arab parties.

In the 2026 election, 69 percent of voters in Kiryat Shmona voted for the parties of the right-wing coalition led by Benjamin Netanyahu, while 24 percent voted for the parties of the center-left coalition led by Gadi Eisenkot and 1 percent voted for the Arab parties. An additional 3 percent voted for the Reservists, and 2.4 percent voted for Amcha Yisrael. Voter turnout increased 9 percent from the 2022 election.

== Notable people ==
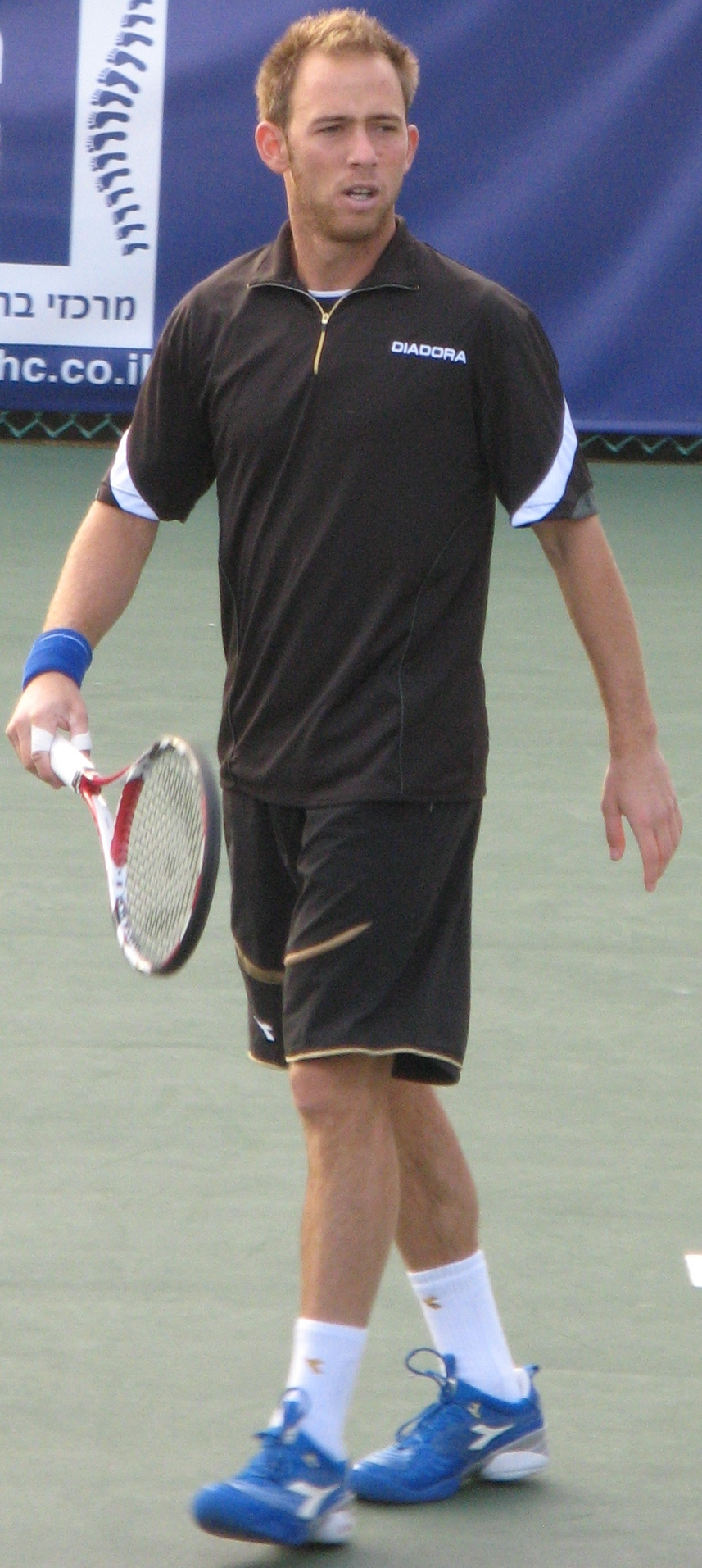
Dudi Sela

- Vladislav Bykanov (born 1989), Olympic speed skater
- Zephaniah Drori (born 1937), Chief Rabbi of Kiryat Shmona
- Ido Kozikaro (born 1978), basketball player
- Dudi Sela (born 1985), tennis player
- Yifat Shasha-Biton (born 1973), educator and politician
- Artem Tsoglin (born 1997), pair skater
- Ofer Yaakobi (born 1961), basketball player
- Eden Ben Zaken (born 1994), singer and songwriter
- Ronald Zilberberg (born 1996), Olympic figure skater

== Twin towns – sister cities ==
Kiryat Shmona is twinned with:

- Hampstead, Quebec, Canada
- Nancy, France
- Memmingen, Germany
- Rishon LeZion, Israel
