= Marwan Habash =

Syrian politician

Marwan Habash مروان حبش
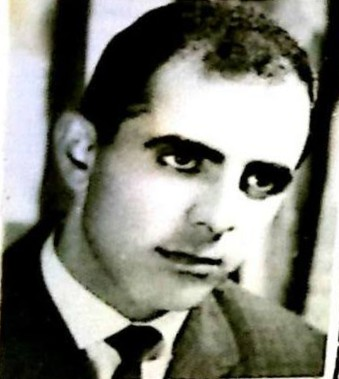
- Habash in 1965

Member of the Regional Command of the Syrian Regional Branch
- In office March 1966 – 13 November 1970
- In office 1 August 1965 – December 1965

Personal details
- Born: 1938 (age 87–88) Jubata ez-Zeit, French Mandate of Syria
- Party: Syrian Regional Branch of the Arab Socialist Ba'ath Party
- Occupation: Politician and writer
- Criminal information
- Status: Released 1993
- Penalty: 23 years in prison

Marwan Habash (Arabic: مروان حبش; born in 1938) is a Syrian former politician and writer. He was a member of the Regional Command of the Ba'ath Party in Syria, member of National Revolutionary Council and Minister of Industry in the government of Salah Jadid. Following a successful coup d'état against Jadid's leadership in 1970, Habash was imprisoned along with others perceived to be Jadid loyalists. One of the world's longest-held political prisoners, he was released in 1993. He has since become a writer and public analyst.

== Early career ==
Born in Jubata ez-Zeit in the Golan Heights, Habash was a member of the Regional Command for the Ba'ath Party between August 1965 and November 1970. Habash also served as the Minister of Front Line Villages Affairs and the Minister of Industry in the government of Salah Jadid.

When the Ba'ath Party split, Habash belonged to the faction that remained loyal to the National Command based in Iraq.

== Imprisonment ==
When followers of then-Defense Minister Hafez al-Assad launched a coup d'état against Jadid's leadership of the government in 1970, Jadid and his loyalists (among whose number Habash was counted), known as the "February 23 Movement", were imprisoned in November and December of that year in al-Mezze military prison in Damascus.

Over the course of his 23-year detention, Habash was tortured by some of his former party colleagues, including Naji Jamil, 'Adnan Dabbagh, 'Ali al-Madani, and Ali Duba. He was released by order of President Hafez al-Assad in 1993.

== Writings and public analyses ==
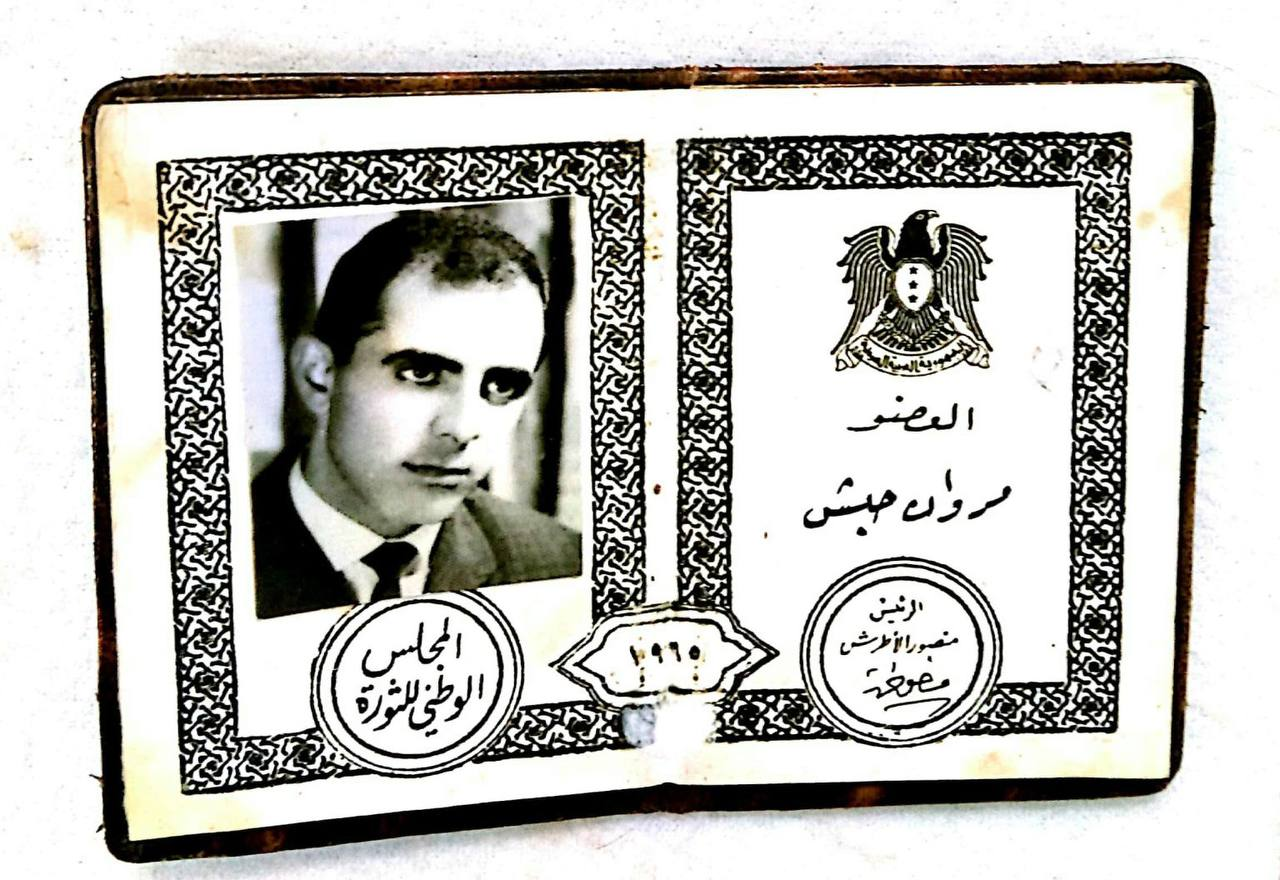
Identity card of Habash, member of the National Revolutionary Council, 1965

Habash published more than 50 articles, covering some 300 pages, that detailed his experiences as a political prisoner, and covered part of the history of the Ba'ath movement in Syria prior to his imprisonment in Kulluna Shuraka' fi al-Watan, and other Arabic-language media, between 2002 and 2009. Among these articles were: Harakat 23 Shubat… al-Dawa'i wa al-Asbab ("The 23 February Movement, its Motives and Reasons"), Muhawalat 'Usyan al-Ra'id Salim Hatum fi al-Suwayda' Yawm 8 Aylul 1966 ("The Revolt Attempt of Major Salim Hatum in al-Suwayda' on 8 September 1966"), and Harb Huzayran: al-Muqaddimat wa al-Waqa'i ("The June War: its Preludes and Facts").

In 2002, Habash was summoned for questioning by Syrian intelligence agents after publishing an article calling for the strengthening of civil society in Syria.
