= Mas'ade =

Mas'ade مسعدة מסעדה
- Town
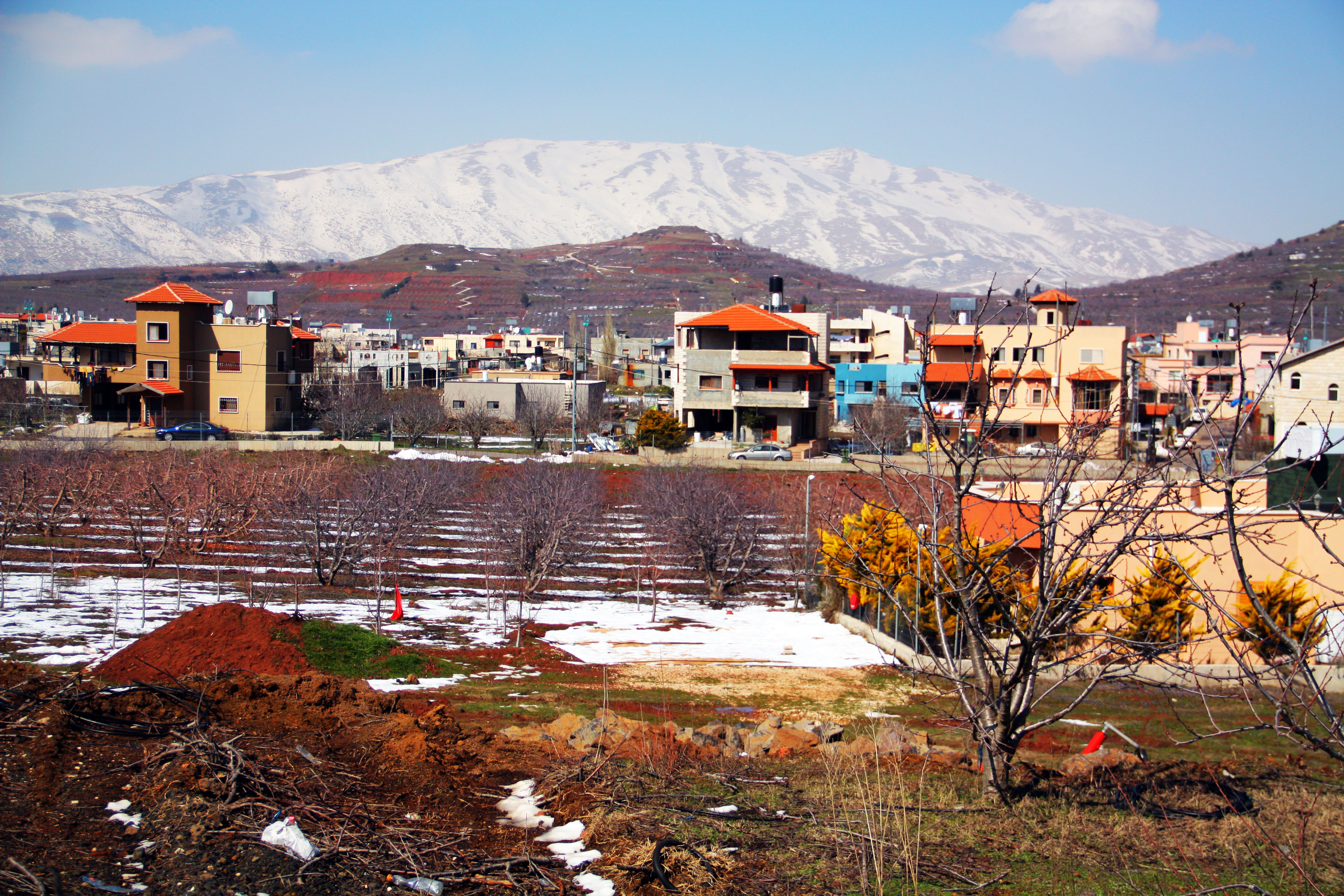

- The Golan on the map of Syria; Mas'ade on the map of the Golan. Mas'ade (Syria)
- Coordinates: 33°13′59″N 35°45′27″E
- Country: Golan Heights, internationally recognized as Syrian territory occupied by Israel. See Status of the Golan Heights.
- Israeli District: Northern
- Israeli Subdistrict: Golan
- Natural Region: Northern Golan
- Syrian Governorate: Quneitra Governorate
- Syrian District: Quneitra District
- Syrian Subdistrict: Mas'ade Subdistrict

Population (2024)
  - Total: 4,205

Mas'ade (Arabic: مسعدة, Hebrew: מַסְעַדֶה) is a Druze village in southwestern Syria, in the Quneitra Governorate, Golan Heights. It has been under Israeli occupation since 1967 and is administered by Israel as a local council since 1982.

It covers an area of 11,985 dunams (11.985 km^{2}; 4.627 sq mi), and in 2024 had a population of 4,205. Its inhabitants are mostly Syrian citizens and have permanent residency in Israel. Since the adoption of the 1981 Golan Heights Law, Mas'ade is under Israeli civil law and is incorporated into the Israeli system of local councils.

The presence of Druze around Mount Hermon is documented since the founding of the Druze religion in the beginning of the 11th century. Mas'ade is one of the four remaining Druze-Syrian communities on the Israeli-occupied side of the Golan Heights and on Mount Hermon, together with Majdal Shams, Ein Qiniyye and Buq'ata. Geographically a distinction is made between the Golan Heights and Mount Hermon, the boundary being marked by the Sa'ar Stream; however, administratively they are usually lumped together. Mas'ade and Buq'ata are on the Golan side of the boundary and are characterized by black volcanic rock (basalt), while Majdal Shams and Ein Qiniyye are on the Hermon side, thus sitting on limestone.

Near Mas'ade are Lake Ram and Odem Forest.

Mas'ade is located at the intersection of Highway 99, which leads west to Kiryat Shmona, and Highway 98, which leads north to Mount Hermon and south to the Kinneret (Sea of Galilee/Lake Tiberias).

== Demography ==
Historical population
Year	Pop.	±%
1983	2,100	—
1995	2,500	+19.0%
2008	3,000	+20.0%
2022	4,091	+36.4%
2024	4,205	+2.8%

== Transportation ==
The Golan Regional Council operates three buses per day from Mas'ade to the Israeli city of Kiryat Shmona. The bus line begins at El Rom, and also stops at Buq'ata, Majdal Shams, and Neve Ativ. The bus ride to Kiryat Shmona takes approximately 29 minutes. Mas'ade is located along Highway 98, a major road running through the Golan Heights.

== Voting Patterns ==
In the 2026 election, 82 percent of voters in Mas'ade voted for the parties of the center-left coalition led by Gadi Eisenkot, while 12 percent voted for the parties of the right-wing coalition led by Benjamin Netanyahu and 3 percent voted for the Arab parties. An additional 1.4 percent voted for the Reservists. Voter turnout more than quintupled compared to the 2022 election, one of the largest increases of any town in Israel (the only other comparable towns are the three other Druze towns in the Golan), which is mostly attributable to the surge in Israeli citizenship among the Golan Druze as a result of the fall of the Assad regime and the 2025 massacres of Druze in southern Syria.

== See also ==
- Druze in Syria
