= Mount Hermon ski resort =

Ski resort in the Golan Heights

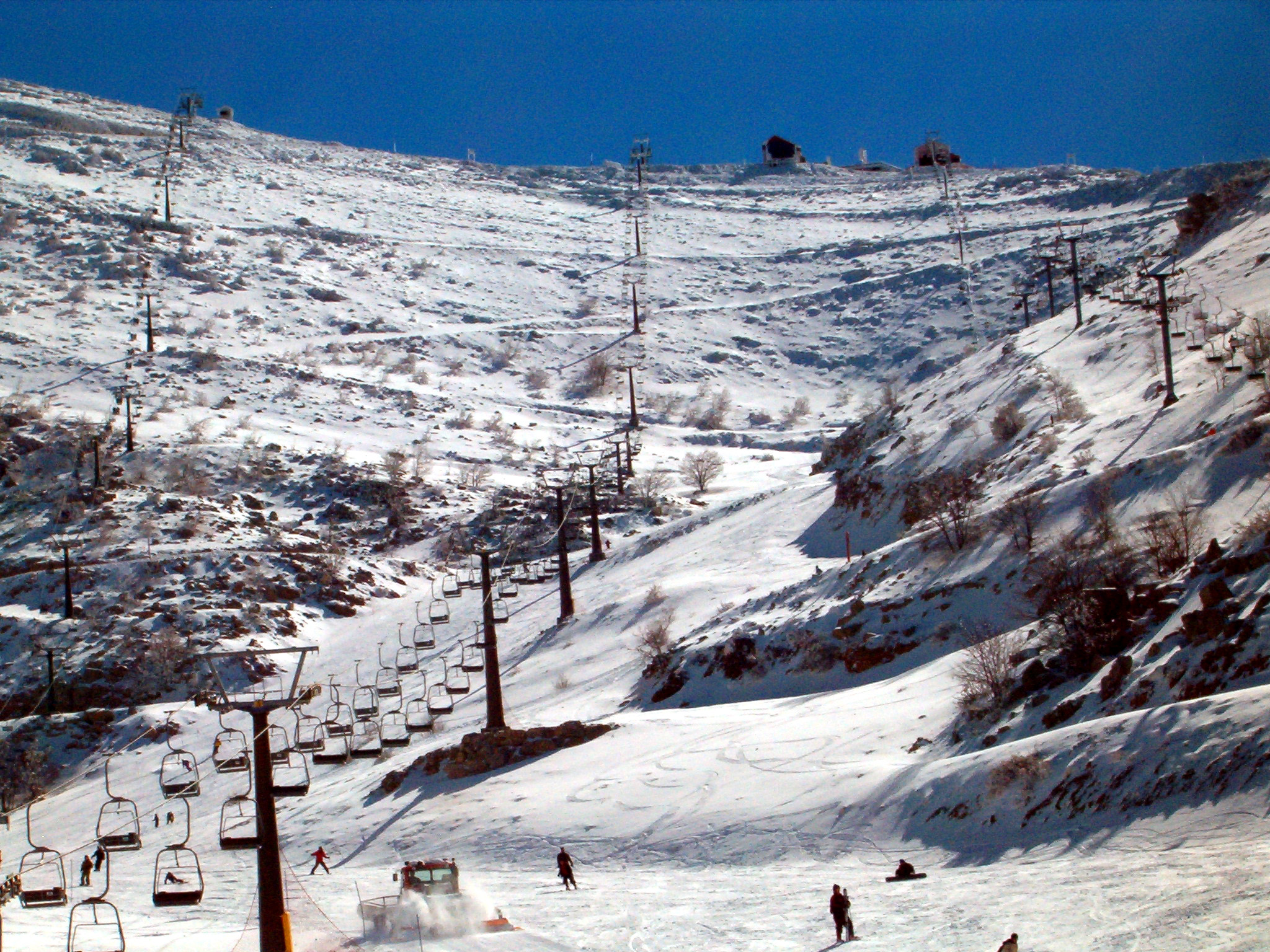
- View of the ski-resort and the cable cars

- Location within the Golan Heights Location within the Golan Heights
- Location: Golan Heights
- Nearest city: Majdal Shams
- Coordinates: 33°18′29″N 35°46′21″E
- Top elevation: 2,040 metres (6,690 ft)
- Base elevation: 1,600 metres (5,200 ft)
- Skiable area: Length of pistes: 45 kilometres (28 mi); Area: 2,134 dunams (213.4 ha)
- Trails: 14
- Lift system: 11
- Website: www.skihermon.co.il

The Mount Hermon ski resort (Hebrew: אתר החרמון) is situated on the south-eastern slopes of Mount Hermon, a few kilometers off the Purple line, in the Israeli-occupied Golan Heights. The site is surrounded by the Hermon nature reserve. While the nature reserve is open year-round, the ski resort is open only at the peak of winter (usually January–March), when enough snow is accumulated on its ground. It has a top elevation of 2,040 metres (6,690 ft), going down to 1,600 metres (5,200 ft), with an area covering about 2,434 dunams (243.4 hectares).

== History ==
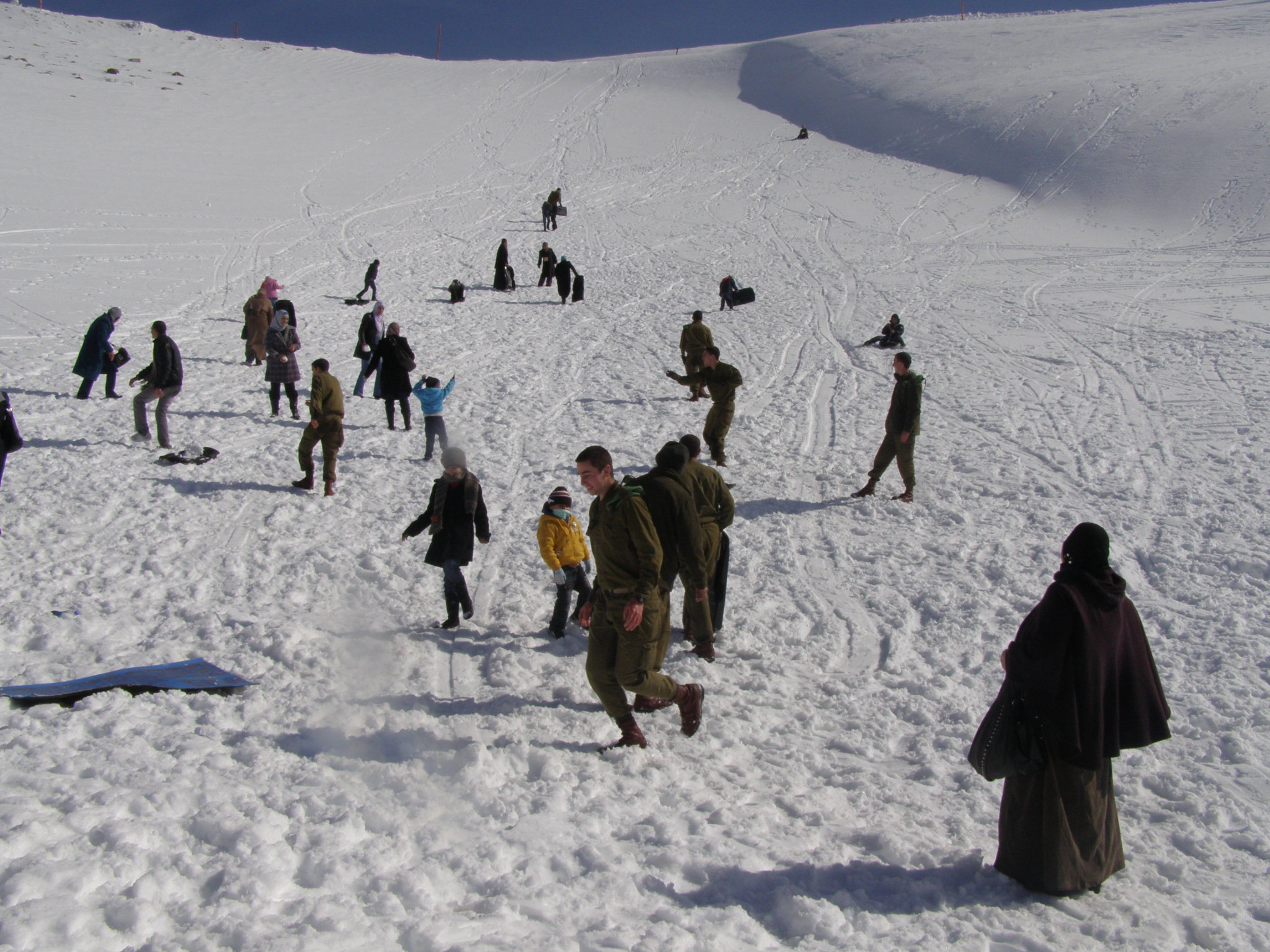
IDF Alpine soldiers take Palestinian children to visit the resort, 2011

The first lift was installed in 1971, largely with assistance from the Jewish Agency for Israel, and the resort first opened to skiers in December 1971.

The next considerable expansion came in 1981 when the region fell under Golan Heights annexion Law, which allowed for easier expansion and additional lifts were added gradually during the next 20 years.

== Facilities and access ==
The resort is accessible via a winding road that extends 24 kilometres (15 mi) and rises 5,400 feet (1,600 m) from the Hula Valley. The resort offers 45 kilometres (28 mi) of trails, with the skiing peak at an elevation of 2,000 metres (6,600 ft) above sea level and the vertical drop to the base measuring 400 metres (1,300 ft).

The resort includes a range of ski trails for novice, intermediate, and expert levels, including seven red pistes, three blue pistes, two black pistes and one green piste. The resort also offers additional winter family activities such as sledding and Nordic skiing. There is still no town at the resort, so those who operate the Hermon Ski area live in the nearby Moshav of Neve Ativ and the town of Majdal Shams. The ski resort has a ski school, ski patrol, and several restaurants located at either the bottom or peak of the area. The resort also has several facilities for summer visitors. As the highest point in Israeli controlled areas, it is also in a very strategically important position for the IDF because it overlooks Syria and Lebanon. In peak season more than 12,000 people can be on the mountain each day. The resort has also added a snowpark.

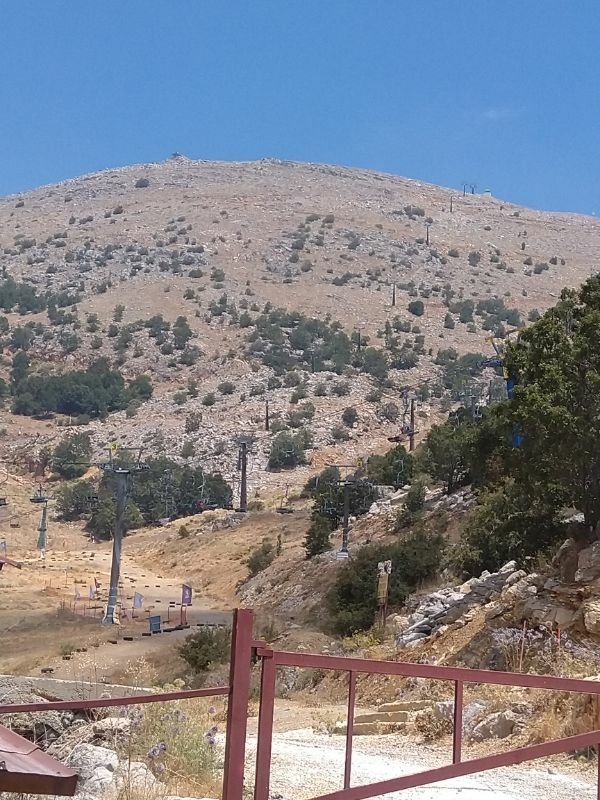
Mount Hermon in August

The resort provides an important source of income to residents of both Neve Ativ and Majdal Shams, the home of many Druze ski instructors.. In the 2000s the resort started suffering from fluctuating temperatures, having had previously two to three months of good snow every winter going down to only two to four weeks. In 1999, for the first time in its history, the resort had no sufficient snow at all for skiing.

== Resort ownership ==
Since 1972, the resort has been operated and held by the residents of the Israeli settlement of Neve Ativ. The families have no property rights in the land and they have not paid the Israel Land Administration for its use in over a decade. SPNI accused resort operators for charging illegal fees. In 2010 the Movement for Quality Government in Israel appealed to the Supreme Court of Israel against the Israel Land Administration. In the appeal Neve Ativ was accused of holding the area of the resort without any valid contract, violating the public's interest and the Israel Land Administration law.

== Legal issues ==
=== Snowcat accident ===
In February 2004 a 24-year-old woman was killed and four others were injured in a snowcat accident. The vehicle was not intended for carrying passengers. The driver was arrested and his lawyer claimed that he was only following the orders of his superiors. In 2008 the Nazareth court sentenced the resort manager, Menahem Baruch, along with three other resort workers, to a suspended six-month jail sentence and a 5000 Israeli new shekel penalty payment. The family of the deceased woman complained that the sentence was not severe enough.

=== Arson of rival business ===
In 2004 police arrested four senior workers at the resort for allegedly ordering the arson of a competing snow equipment rental business in Majdal Shams. According to allegations the four offered two fellow resort workers a sum of 40 thousand Israeli new shekels each for setting fire to the competing business. Additionally resort workers allegedly harassed visitors who rented equipment from the rival shop.

== Specifics ==
- Top peak: 2,040 m (6,690 ft)
- Base elevation: 1,600 m (5,200 ft)
- Number of pistes: 14
- Length of pistes: 45 km (28 mi)
- Area: 5,000 dunams (500 ha)
- Number of lifts: 8

== See also ==
- Anti-Lebanon Mountains
