= Tzahar =

Coordinates: 32°58′11.76″N 35°31′32.39″E

The Tzahar (Hebrew: צח"ר) region is part of Galilee, in Israel. Its name is an acronym for the three cities it contains: Safed (Tzfat), Hazor HaGelilit and Rosh Pinna. The population of the region is almost entirely Jewish and numbers 40,000.

It is twinned with West Palm Beach, Florida, United States.
