= National parks and nature reserves of Israel =

Protected areas in Israel and the Israeli-occupied territories

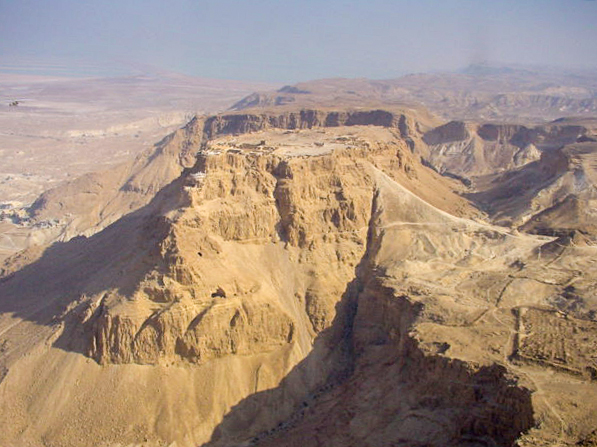
Masada National Park

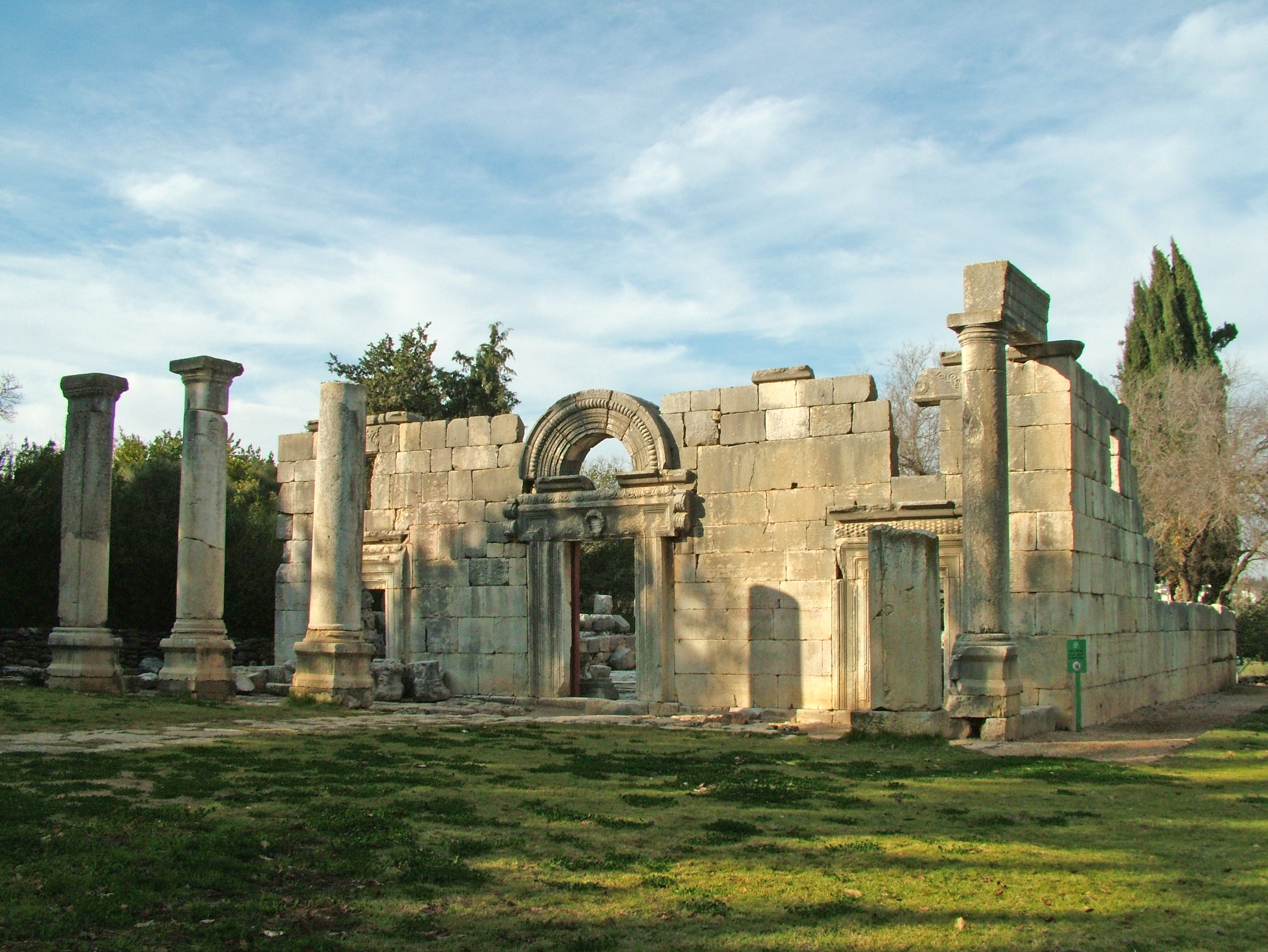
Ruins of the ancient synagogue at Bar'am National Park

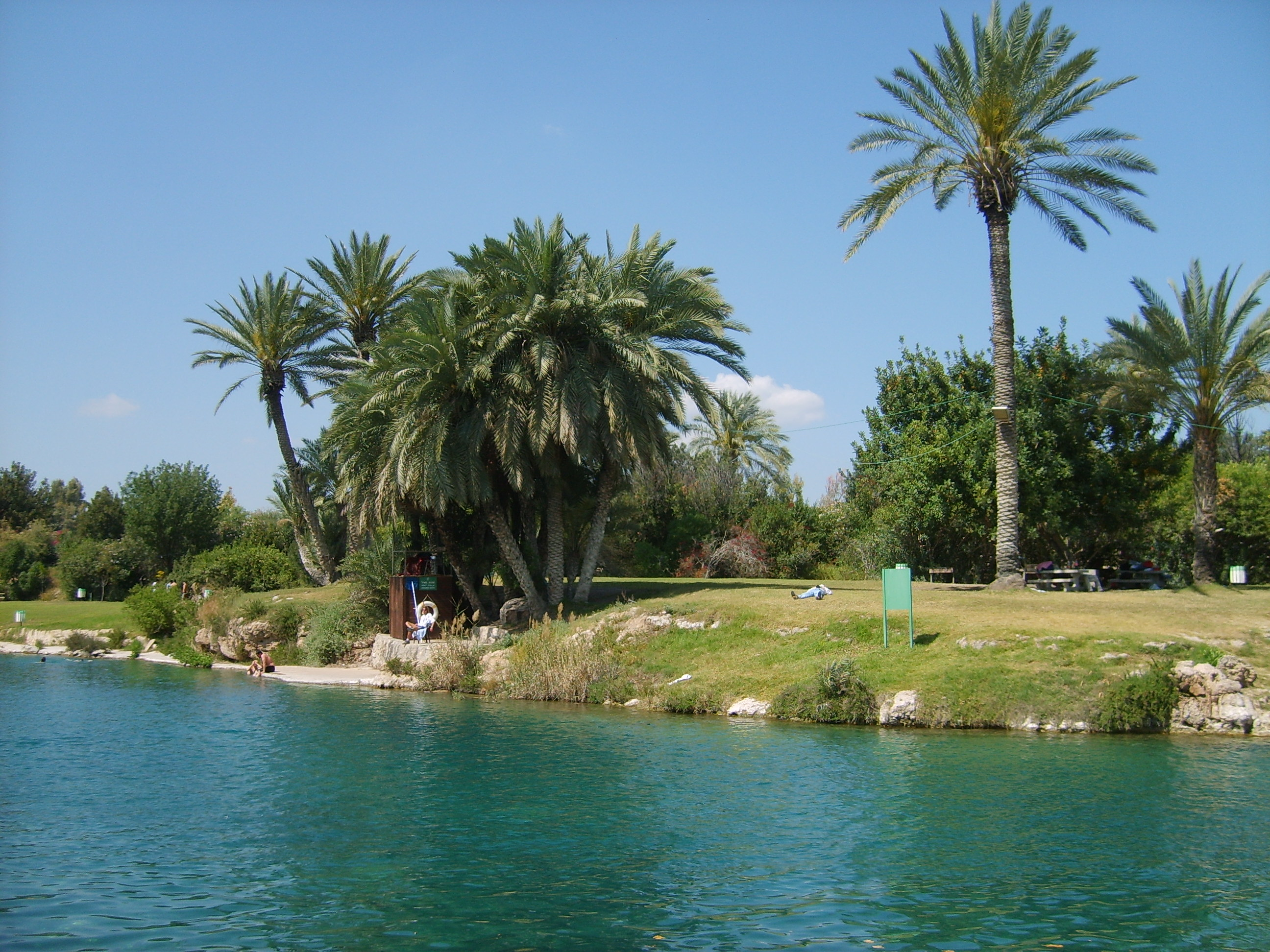
Natural warm water pool at Gan HaShlosha

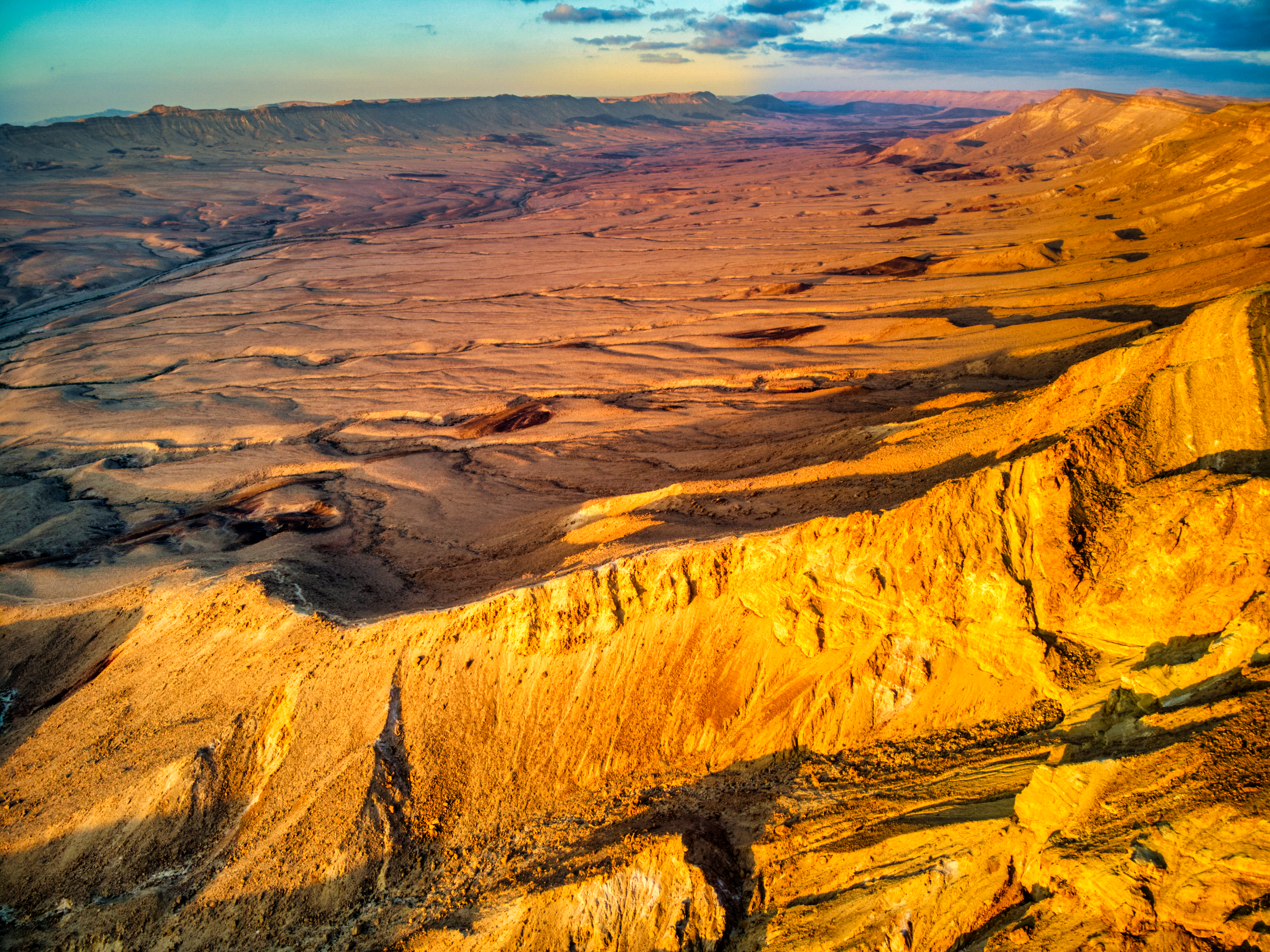
Makhtesh Ramon

National parks of Israel are declared historic sites or nature reserves, which are mostly operated and maintained by the National Nature and Parks Authority. As of 2015, Israel maintains 81 national parks and more than 400 nature reserves, including in the occupied West Bank, that protect 2,500 species of indigenous wild plants, 32 species of fish, 530 species of birds and 100 species of mammals.

The parks and reserves were frequently declared around the ruins of the depopulated and subsequently demolished towns and villages of the 1948 Palestinian expulsion and flight; 182 historical Palestinian built up areas are located within Israel's parks and reserves. Some parks are located at archaeological sites such as Tel Megiddo, Beit She'an, Ashkelon and Kursi. Others, such as the Alexander stream, Mount Carmel National Park or Hurshat Tal focus on nature and the preservation of local flora and fauna. Several parks and nature reserves have camping options, such as tent grounds and bungalows, open to small groups and individual campers. Some of them are located in the Israeli-occupied territories of the Golan Heights and the West Bank.

In 2011, the most popular national parks were Yarkon National Park, Caesarea, Ein Gedi and Tel Dan.

== History ==
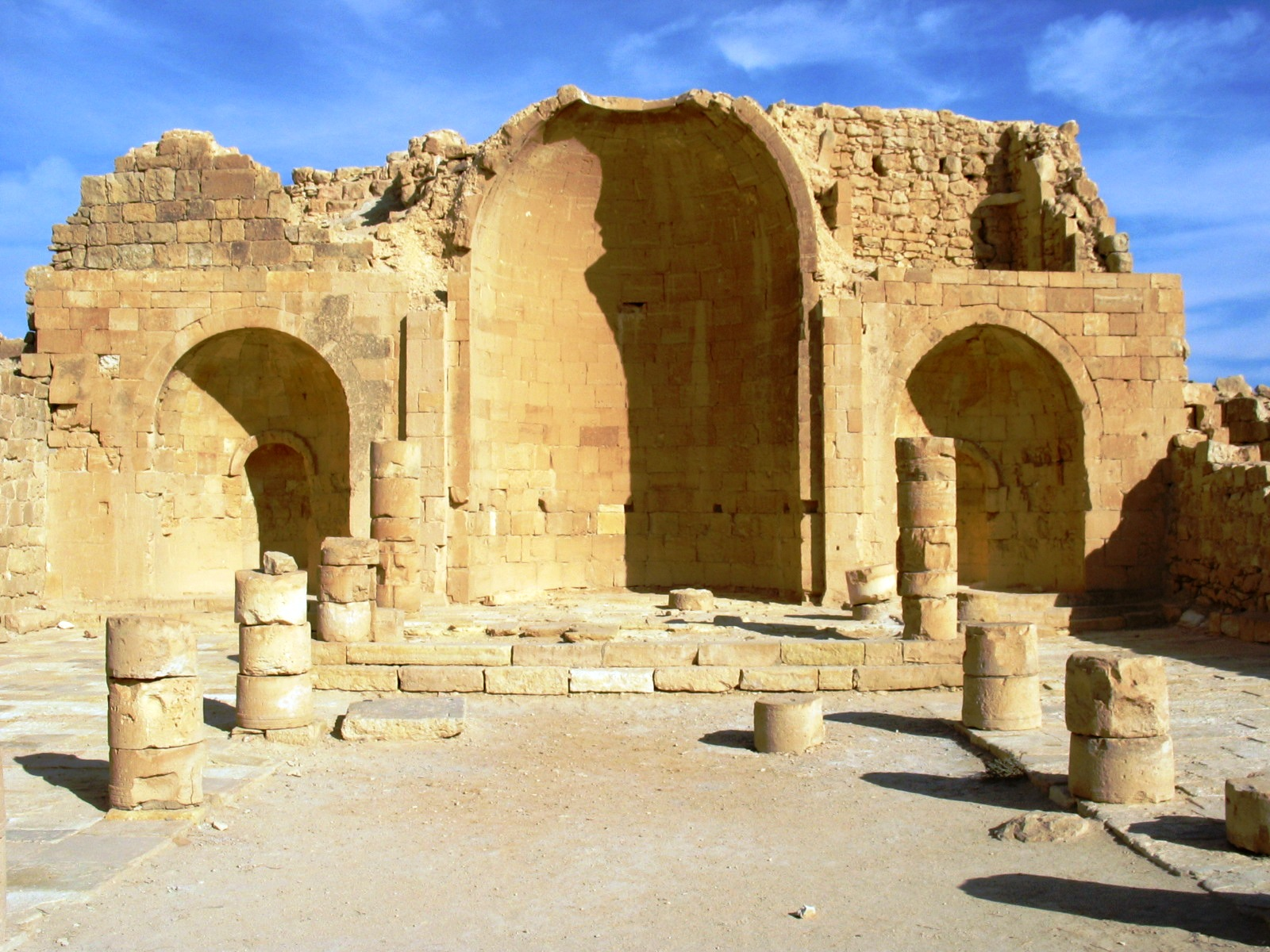
Shivta National Park, UNESCO World Heritage Site

From the 1920s onwards, the British Mandatory government passed laws aimed at saving the local flora and fauna. In 1924 a Hunting Act was published and in 1926 a Forest Ordinance were published. Many sites, such as the forests of Mount Carmel and Mount Meron, were declared forest reserves; certain trees were declared protected.

In 1953 the Knesset passed the Wildlife Protection Law (חוק הגנת חיות-הבר) and the Minister of Agriculture was appointed for its implementation. In 1955, the department for the improvement of the country's landscape (המחלקה לשיפור נוף הארץ) was established in the Israeli Prime Minister's Office, which was assigned the establishment of tourist infrastructure. The department established a number of well-known national parks, such as Gan HaShlosha, Caesarea, Shivta and Avdat. Following the ecologically disastrous drying of Lake Hula and the resulting public pressure, the Hula Reserve was established in 1964, which was the first declared nature reserve in Israel. In 1963 the Knesset approved the "National parks and nature reserves act" (חוק הגנים הלאומיים ושמורות הטבע), whose legislation process had already began in 1956. As a result, two authorities were established: the National Parks Authority and the Nature Reserves Authority. In 1998 the two authorities were merged into one body - Israel Nature and Parks Authority.

The last observation of an Arabian leopard took place in the northern Arabah area in 2010/11. It is possibly extinct in the country.

== Parks and reserves ==
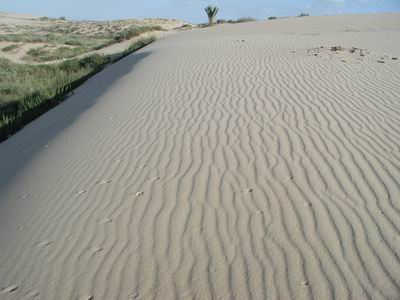
Nitzanim Sand Dune Park, Ashdod

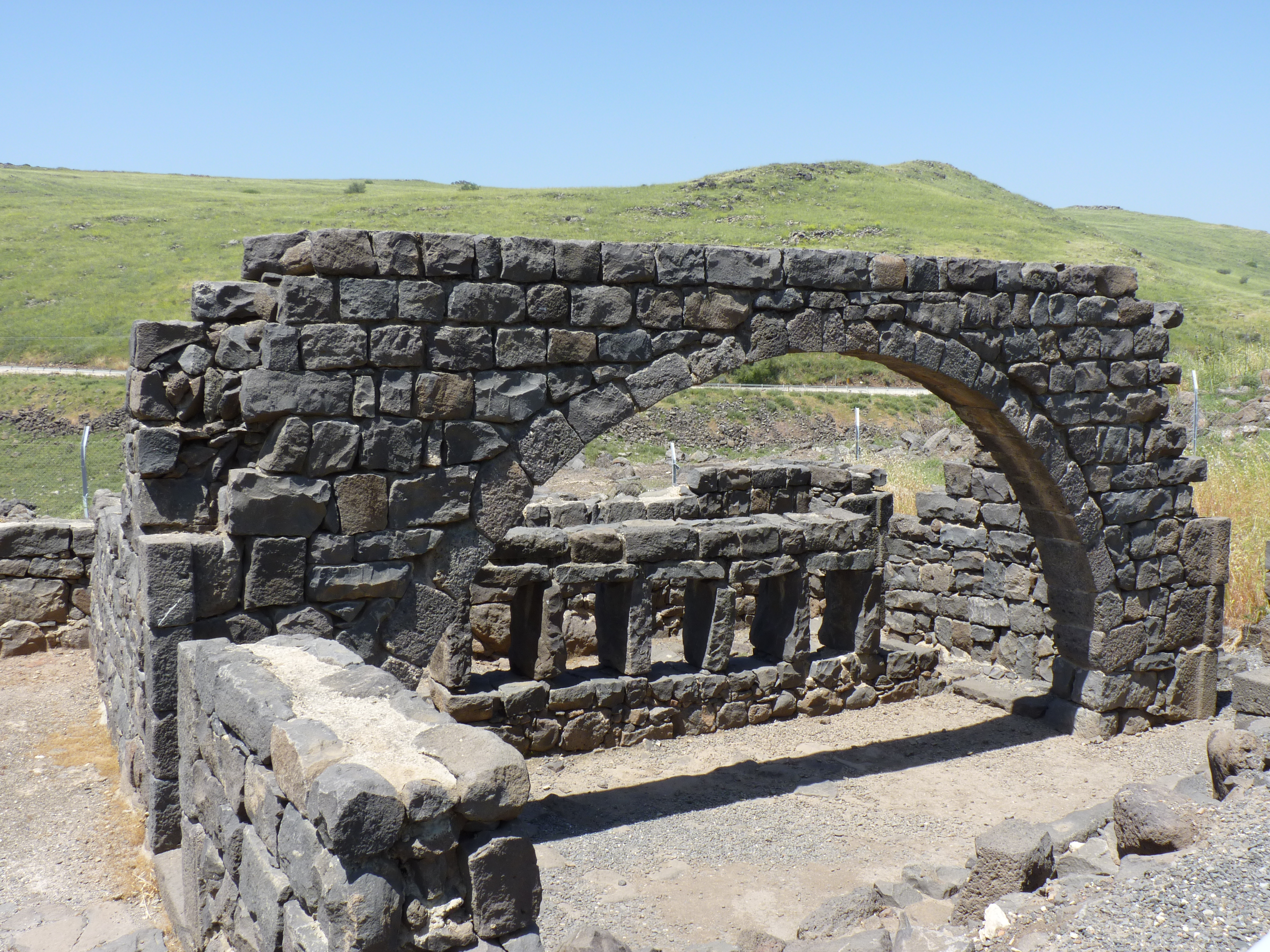
Korazim National Park

In Israel the distinction between national parks and nature reserves is often hard to make. National parks are in most cases centered around archaeological sites, but sometimes include protected nature habitats. The nature reserves often contain not just protected fauna and flora, but also major archaeological sites. The Hermon Stream Nature Reserve for instance covers a stretch of forested land, but also the vast remains of the ancient city of Banias/Caesarea Philippi. Sometimes an administrative separation is made, as for instance at the Judean desert oasis of Ein Gedi, home to both the Ein Gedi Antiquities National Park and Ein Gedi Nature Reserve.

=== National parks in Israel ===
This is a partial list, containing only the best known national parks.

Name	Region
Akhziv Beach National Park (nature reserve with some archaeology)	Northern District: Western Galilee
Alexander River National Park (nature reserve with some archaeology)	Central District
Arbel National Park and Nature Reserve	Northern District: Upper Galilee
Apollonia-Arsuf National Park	Tel Aviv District
Ashkelon National Park	Central District: Southern Coastal Plain
Avdat National Park	Southern District: the Negev
Bar'am National Park	Northern District: Upper Galilee
Beit Alfa Synagogue National Park	Northern District: Jezreel Valley
Beit Guvrin National Park	Central District: Shephelah
Beit She'an National Park	Northern District: Beit She'an valley
Beit She'arim National Park	Northern District: Jezreel Valley
Caco/Qaqun National Park	Central District: Hefer Valley, Sharon plain
Caesarea National Park	Northern District: Sharon plain coast
Castel National Park	Central District: Jerusalem corridor
Ein Avdat National Park (nature reserve with some archaeology)	Southern District: the Negev
Ein Gedi Antiquities National Park (see also Ein Gedi Nature Reserve)	Southern District: Judean Desert and The Dead Sea
Ein Hemed National Park (fortified Crusader structure and nature reserve)	Central District: Jerusalem corridor
Elah Valley National Park	Jerusalem District: Shephelah
Eshkol National Park (Besor; nature reserve with some archaeology)	Southern District: the Negev
Gan Hashlosha National Park (Sakhne; water park and archaeology museum)	Northern District: Jezreel Valley
Hamat Tiberias National Park	Northern District: Sea of Galilee
Lakhish National Park (not fully ready to receive tourists)	Jerusalem District: Shephelah
Lavnin Ridge Nature Reserve and Park (National Park established in April 2019)	Jerusalem District: Shephelah
Ma'ayan Harod (Harod Spring) National Park (nature reserve and Yehoshua and Olga Hankin memorial house)	Northern District: Jezreel Valley
HaSharon Park (nature reserve)	Central District: Sharon plain
Hurshat Tal National Park (public park and nature reserve)	Northern District: Upper Galilee
Kochav HaYarden National Park (Belvoir Fortress and Igael Tumarkin sculpture park)	Northern District: Lower Galilee
Korazim National Park	Northern District: Upper Galilee
Mamshit National Park	Southern District: the Negev
Masada National Park	Southern District: Judean Desert and the Dead Sea
Mount Carmel National Park	Northern District: Mount Carmel
Ramon Park at Makhtesh Ramon (nature reserve with archaeological sites)	Southern District: the Negev
Ben-Gurion Tomb National Park at Midreshet Ben-Gurion near Sde Boker	Southern District: the Negev
Shivta National Park	Southern District: the Negev
Tel Arad National Park	Southern District: Judean Desert
Tel Be'er Sheva National Park	Southern District: the Negev
Tel Hazor National Park	Northern District: Upper Galilee
Tel Megiddo National Park	Northern District: Jezreel Valley
Nahal Zalmon National Park	Northern District: Lower Galilee
Yarkon National Park (archaeological sites and nature reserve)	Central District: Yarkon River springs, central Israel
Yehi'am Fortress National Park	Northern District: Upper Galilee
Zippori National Park (Sepphoris)	Northern District: Lower Galilee and the valleys

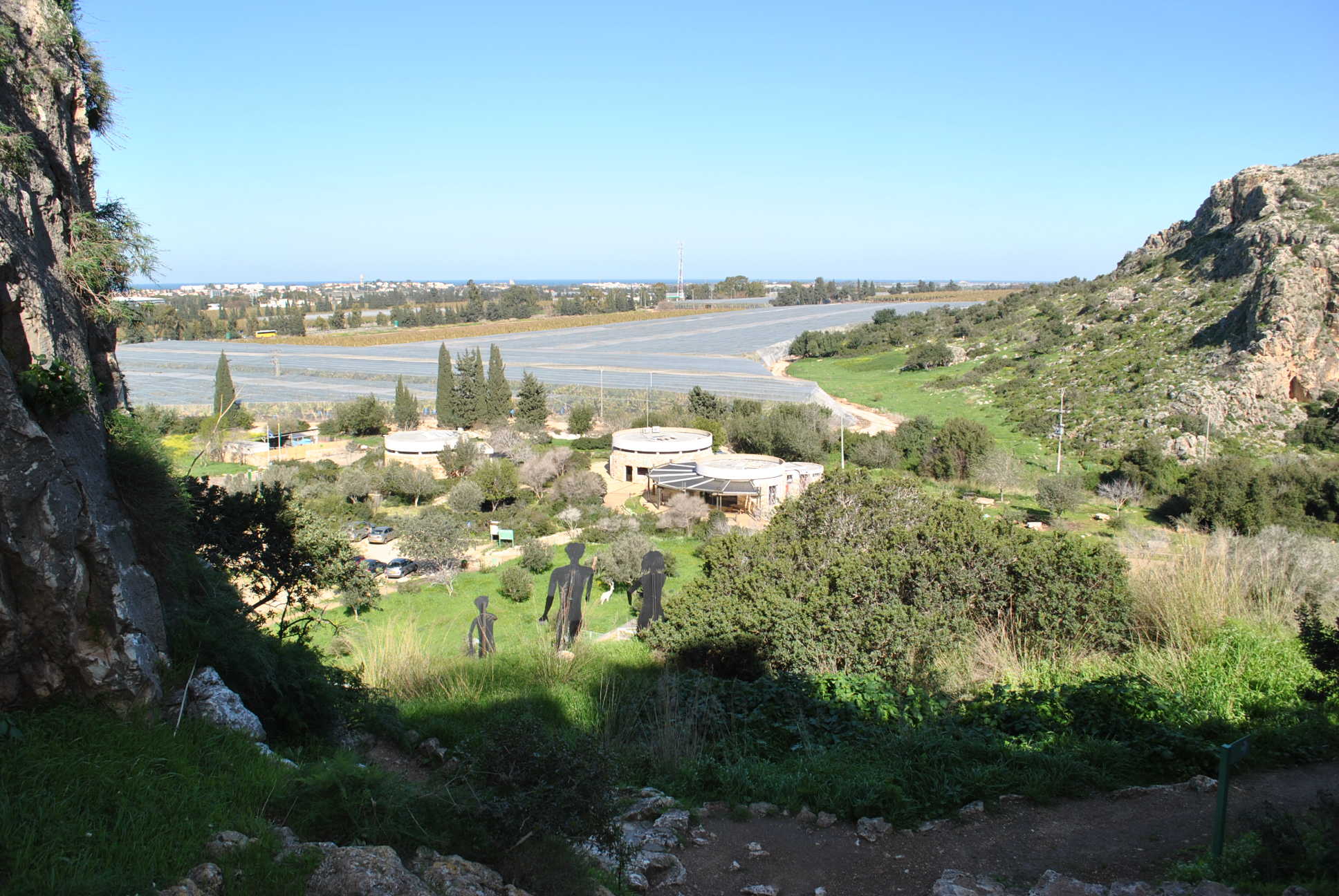
Nahal Me'arot Nature Reserve - World Heritage Site

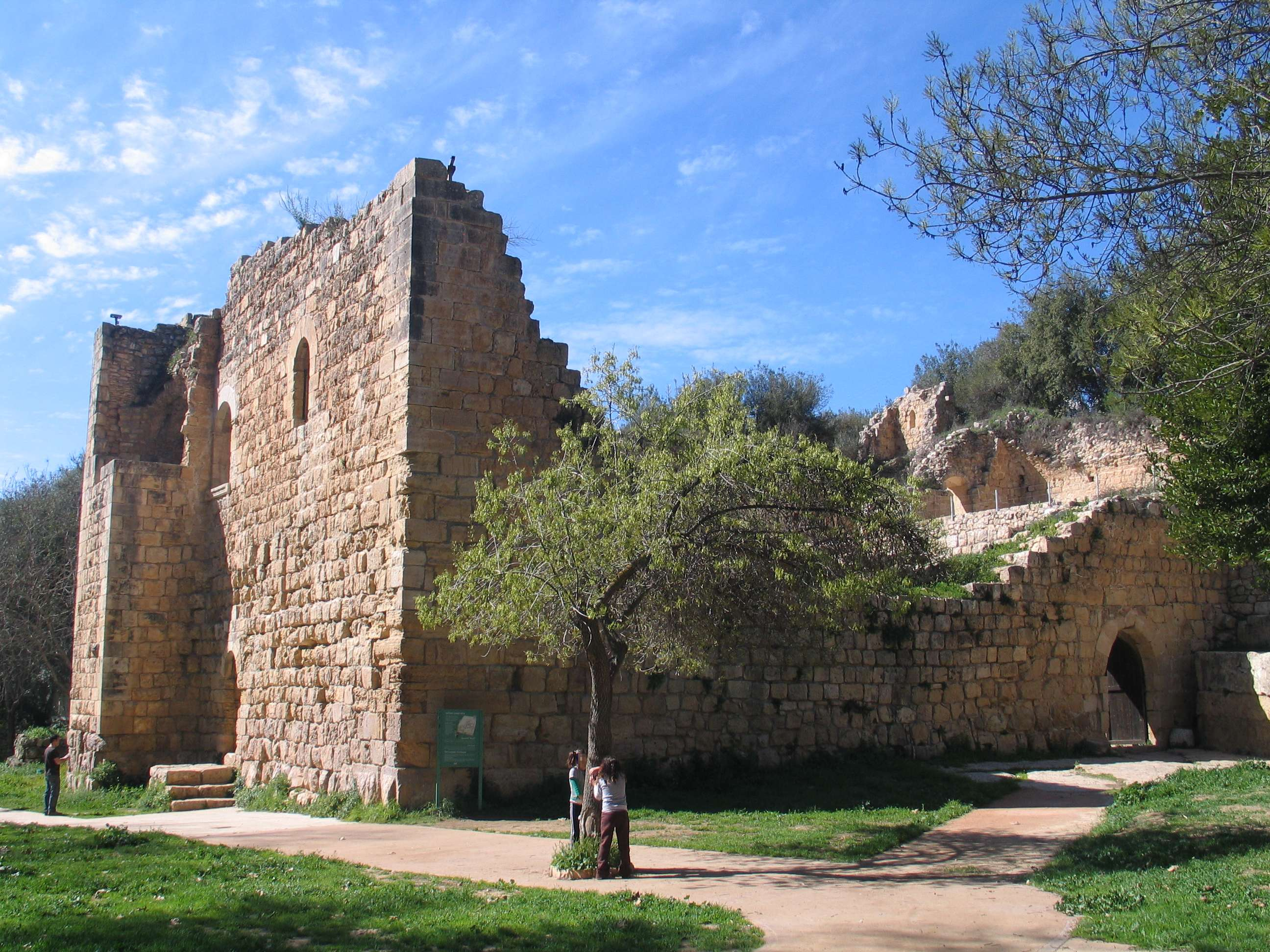
Crusader ruins at Ein Hemed National Park

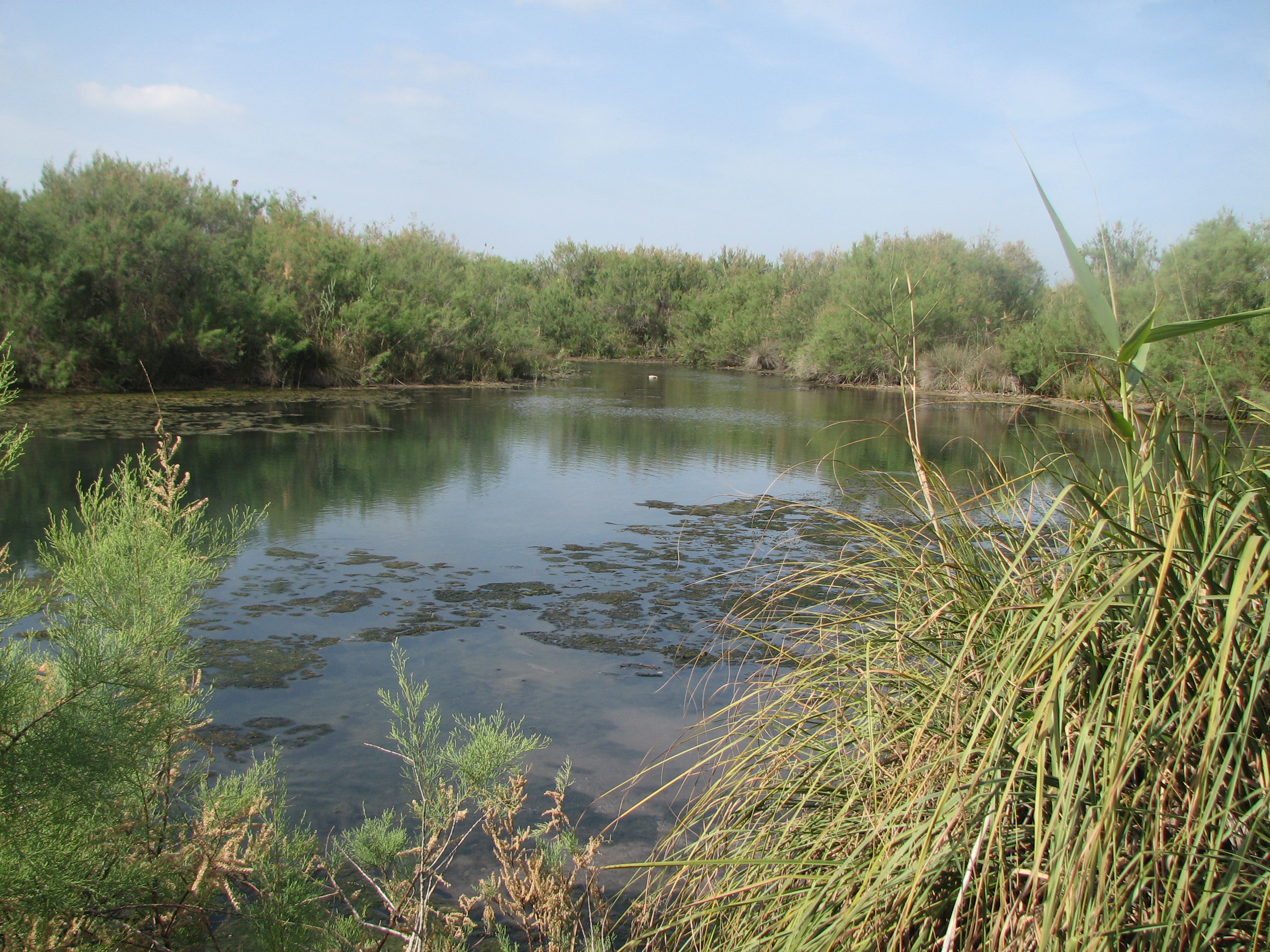
Nahal Taninim in northern Israel

=== National parks in occupied territories ===
Name	Region
Baptismal Site on the Jordan River - Qasr al-Yahud	Southern District: Judean Desert
Herodion National Park	Southern District: Judean Desert/West Bank
Hermon Stream (Banias) Nature Reserve (Banias/Caesarea Philippi archaeological site and Hermon Stream nature reserve)	Northern District: Golan Heights
Kursi National Park	Northern District: Golan Heights
Nimrod Fortress National Park (Qal'at Namrud)	Northern District: Golan Heights
Qumran National Park	Southern District: Judean Desert and the Dead Sea
Sebastia National Park (Samaria/Shomron)	Central District: Samaria/West Bank

=== Nature reserves in Israel ===
This is a partial list, containing only the best known nature reserves.

Name	Region
Alonei Yitzhak Nature Reserve	Northern District
Alonei Abba Nature Reserve	Northern District: Jezreel Valley
Amud Stream (Nahal Amud) Nature Reserve	Northern District: Upper Galilee
Be'eri Badlands Nature Reserve	western Negev, Eshkol Regional Council
Nitzanim Nature Reserve	Central District: Southern Coastal Plain
Soreq/Avshalom/Stalactites Cave	Central District: Shephelah
Ayun/Iyyon Stream (Nahal Ayun/Iyyon)	Northern District: Upper Galilee
Bethsaida (Beit Zaida/Betiha) Nature Reserve (archaeological site and nature reserve)	Northern District: Sea of Galilee
Betzet Stream (Nahal Betzet)	Northern District: Upper Galilee
Balfouria	Northern District: Jezreel Valley
Bitan Aharon	Northern District: Sharon plain
Carmel Hai-Bar Nature Reserve in the Mount Carmel National Park	Northern District: Mount Carmel
Coral Beach Nature Reserve	Eilat
Dor HaBonim Beach Nature Reserve (with Dor Habonim marine nature reserve, Dor and Ma'agan Michael islands, Tel Dor National Park)	Northern District: Mount Carmel coast
Ein Afek Nature Reserve with Tel Afek (archaeological site and nature reserve)	Northern District: Western Galilee
Ein Gedi Nature Reserve (nature reserve with several archaeological sites; see also Ein Gedi Antiquities National Park)	Southern District: Judean Desert and the Dead Sea
Hurshat Tal	Northern District: Upper Galilee
Hula Valley Nature Reserve	Northern District: Hula Valley
Kerem Ben Zimra	Northern District: Upper Galilee
Kziv Stream (Nahal Kziv) Nature Reserve with Crusader-era Montfort Castle	Northern District: Upper Galilee
Lifta (Mei Nephtoah) Nature Reserve	Jerusalem District
Mount Arbel Nature Reserve with several archaeological sites	Northern District: Lower Galilee
Mount Carmel Nature Reserve - see Mount Carmel National Park	Northern District: Mount Carmel
Mount Gilboa Nature Reserve	Northern District
Mount Meron Nature Reserve	Northern District: Upper Galilee
Mount Tabor Nature Reserve	Northern District: Lower Galilee
Nahal Me'arot Nature Reserve - UNESCO Site of Human Evolution (paleoanthropological sites)	Northern District: Mount Carmel
Neot Kedumim Nature Reserve with biblical garden and wildlife breeding center	Central District: near Modi'in and the Ben Shemen forest
Pa'ar Cave Nature Reserve	Northern District: Upper Galilee
Poleg Stream (Nahal Poleg) Nature Reserve	Central District: Sharon Plain
Rosh HaNikra Nature Reserve - marine caves and 20th-century tunnels	Northern District: Western Galilee
Shimron Nature Reserve	Northern District: Jezreel Valley
Tabor/Tavor Stream (Nahal Tavor)	Northern District: Lower Galilee
Taninim Stream (Nahal Taninim) Nature Reserve	Northern District: Mount Carmel coast
Tel Dan Nature Reserve including major archaeological site	Northern District: Upper Galilee
Tel Anafa Nature Reserve around archaeological site	Northern District: Upper Galilee
Yotvata Hai-Bar Nature Reserve (desert wildlife)	Eilat region:the Arava Valley north of Eilat
Zakum (Maoz Haim) Nature Reserve	Northern District: Beit She'an Valley

=== Nature reserves in occupied territories ===
Name	Region
Ein Prat Nature Reserve	Jerusalem district, West Bank
Einot Tzukim (Ein Feshkha) Nature Reserve (nature reserve and archaeological site)	Southern District: Judean Desert and the Dead Sea (West Bank)
Gamla Nature Reserve (archaeological site and nature reserve)	Northern District: Golan Heights
Hermon Stream (Banias) Nature Reserve (with Caesarea Philippi archaeological site)	Northern District: Golan Heights
Snir Stream (Nahal Senir) Nature Reserve	Northern District: Golan Heights
Yehudiya Forest Nature Reserve	Northern District: Golan Heights down to Sea of Galilee

== Gallery of nature in Israel ==
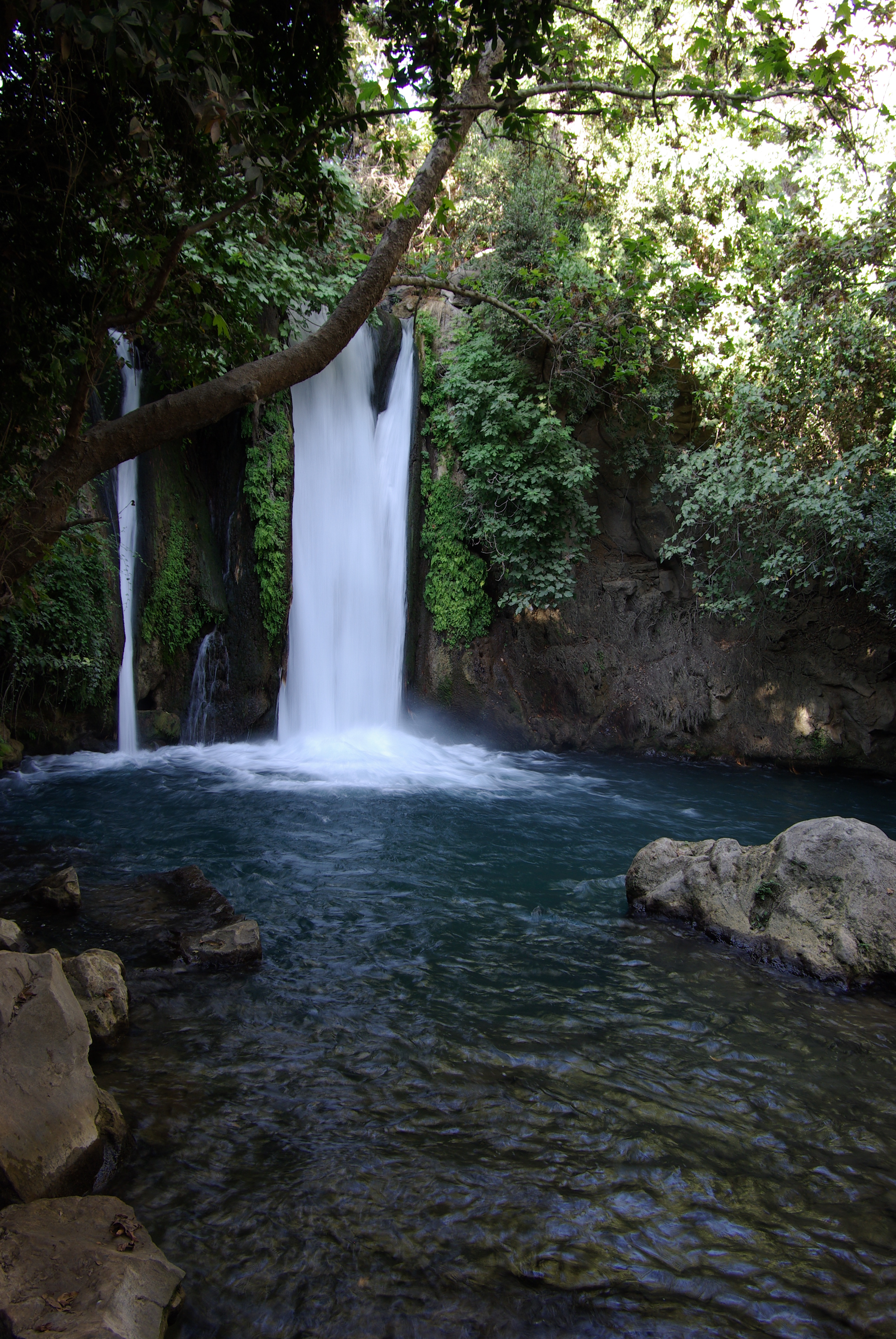
Banias spring

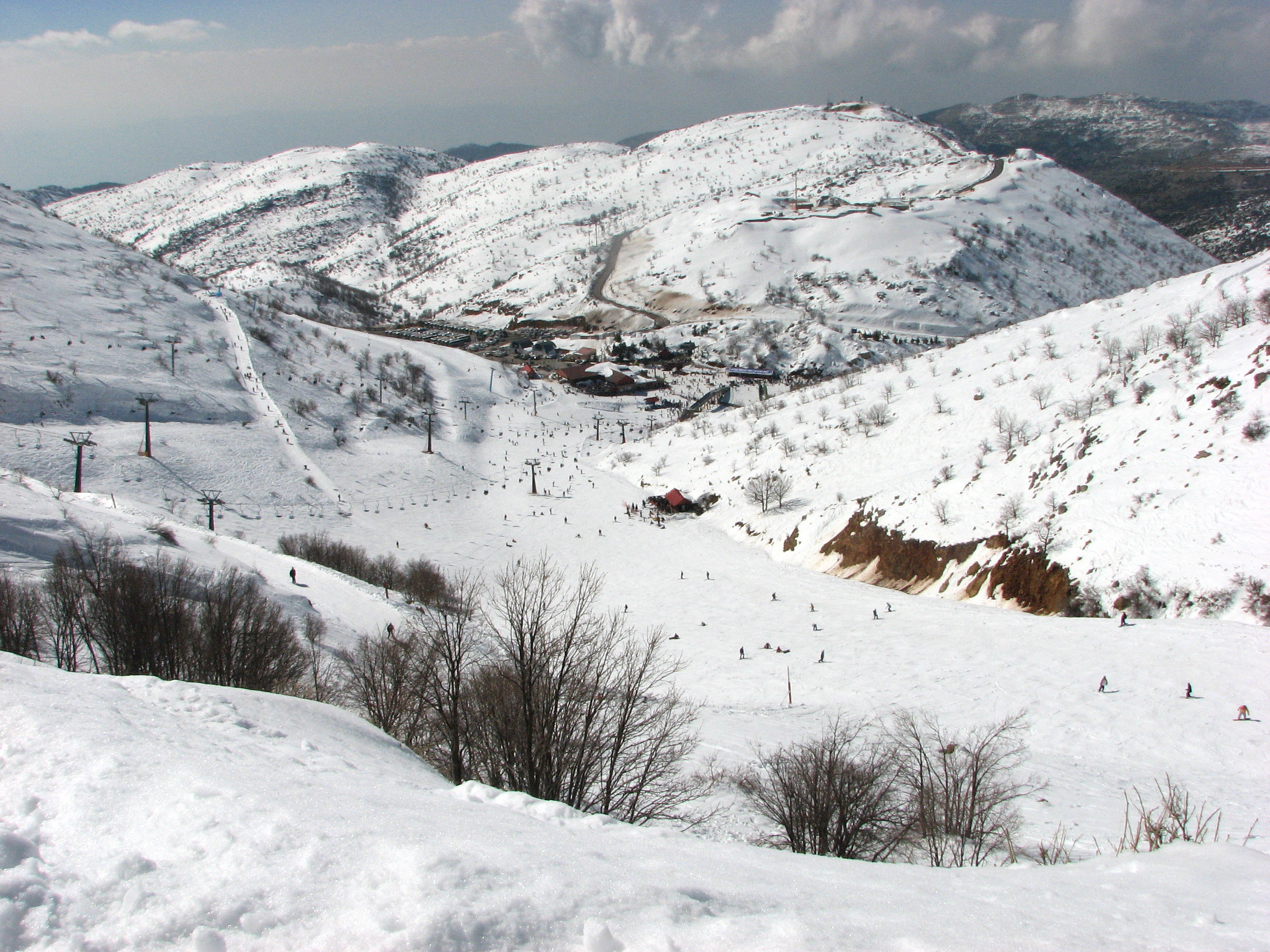
Hermon snow

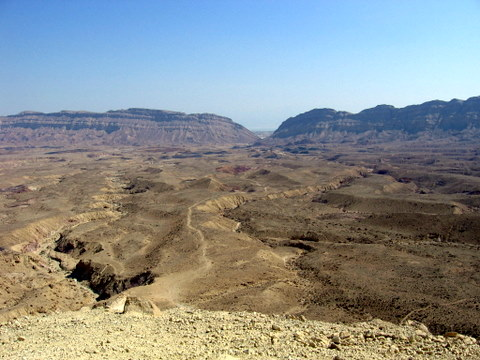
HaMaktesh HaKatan

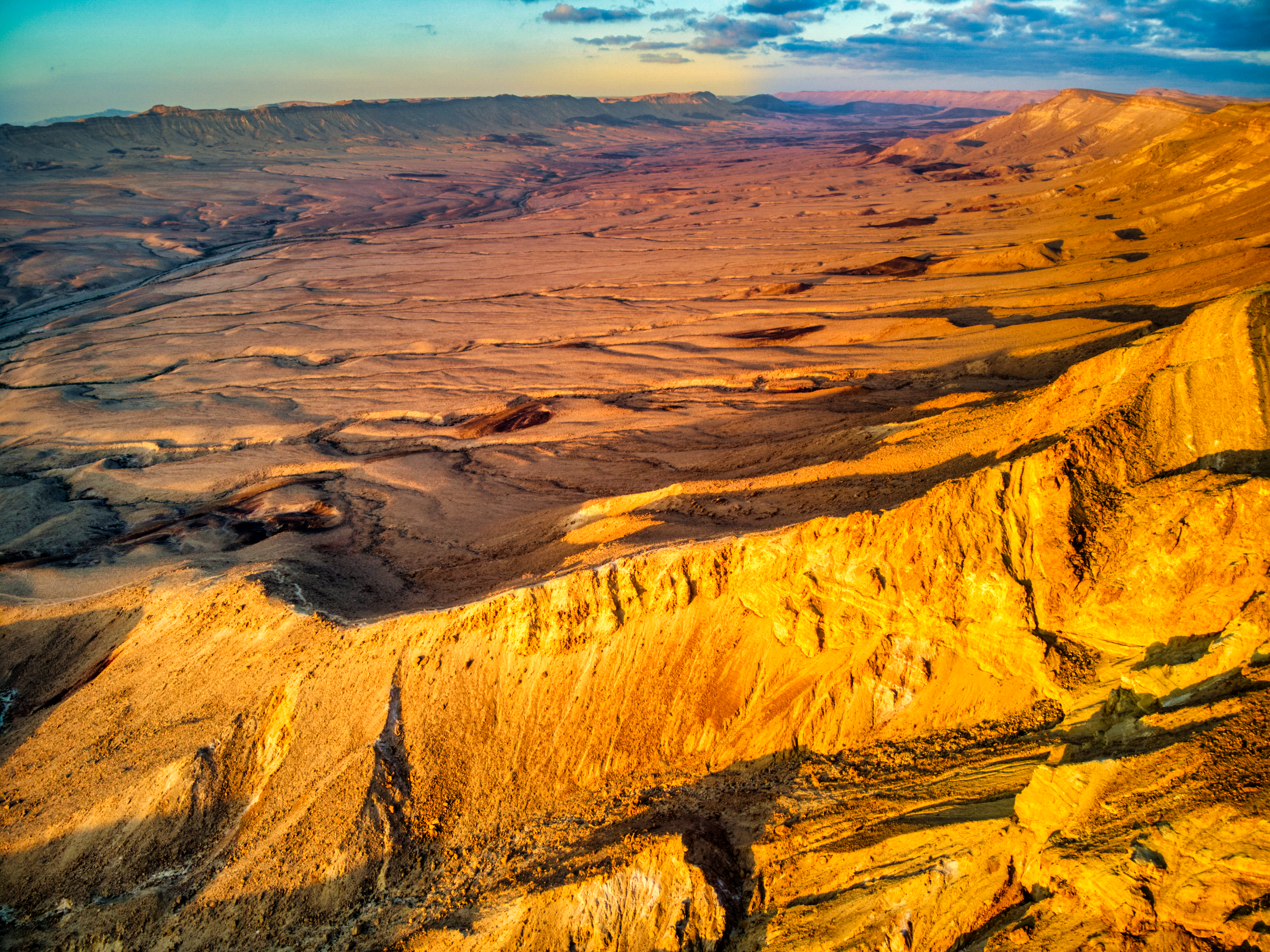
Maktesh Ramon

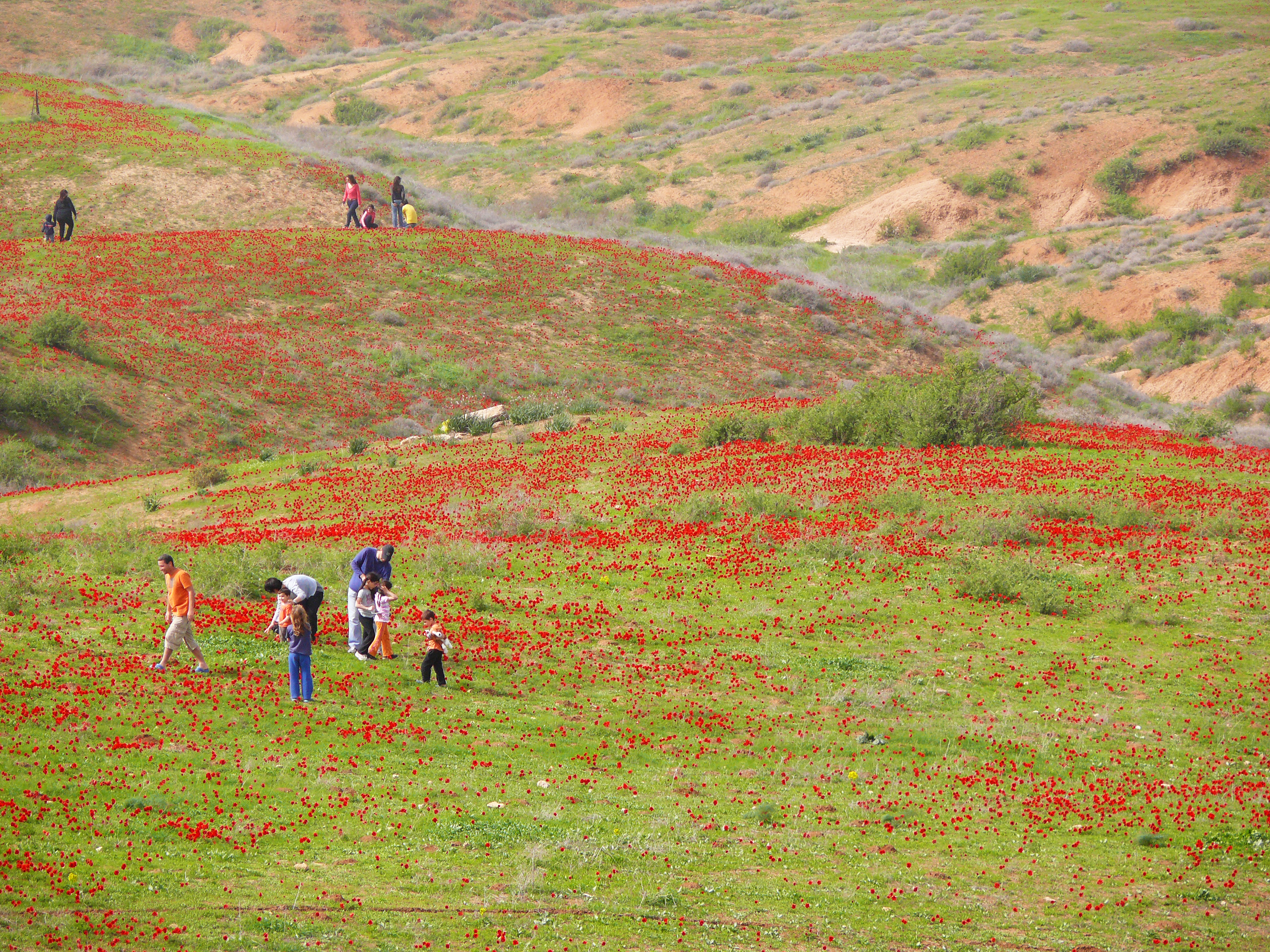
Pura Reserve

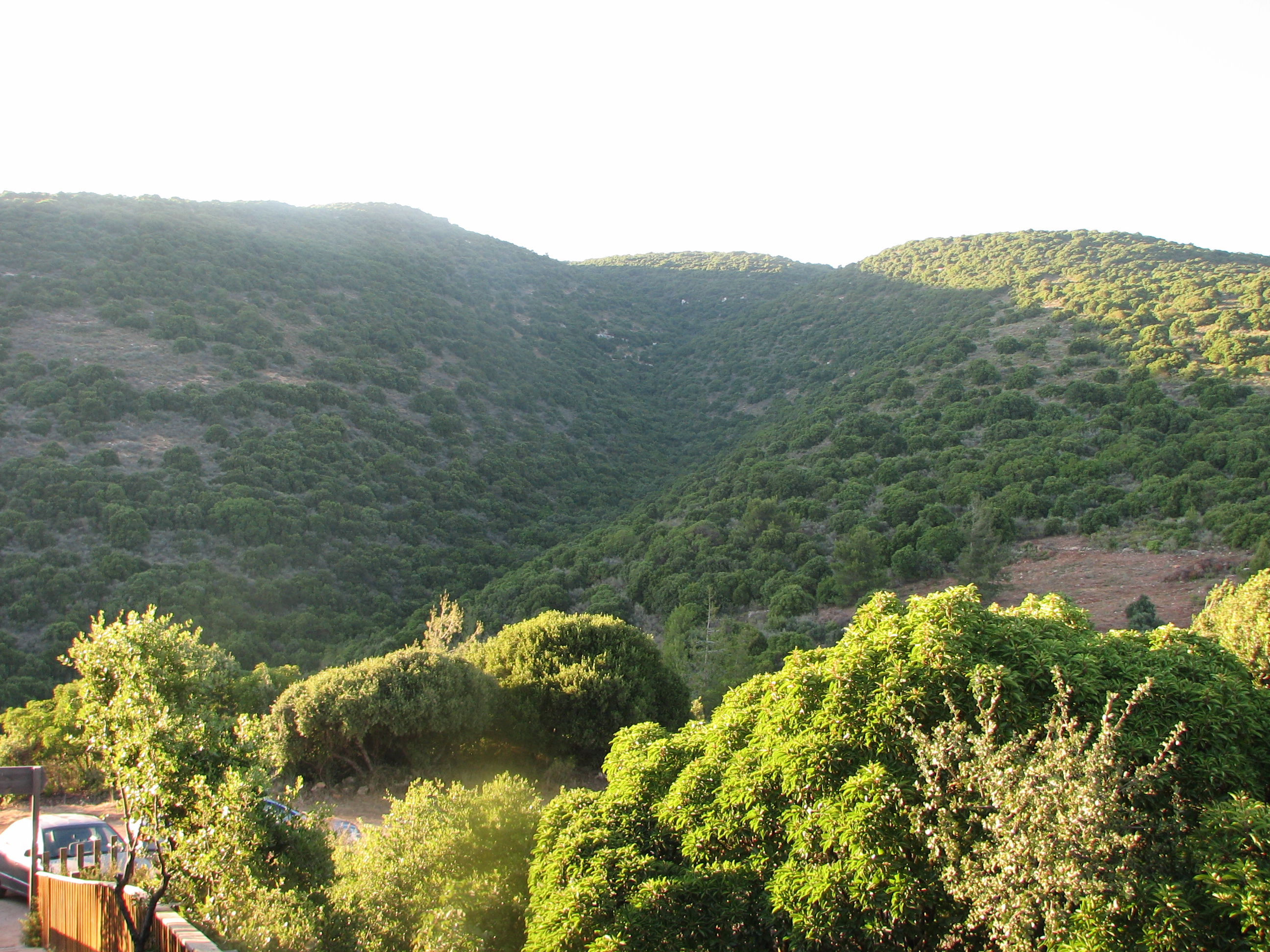
Meron mountain nature reserve

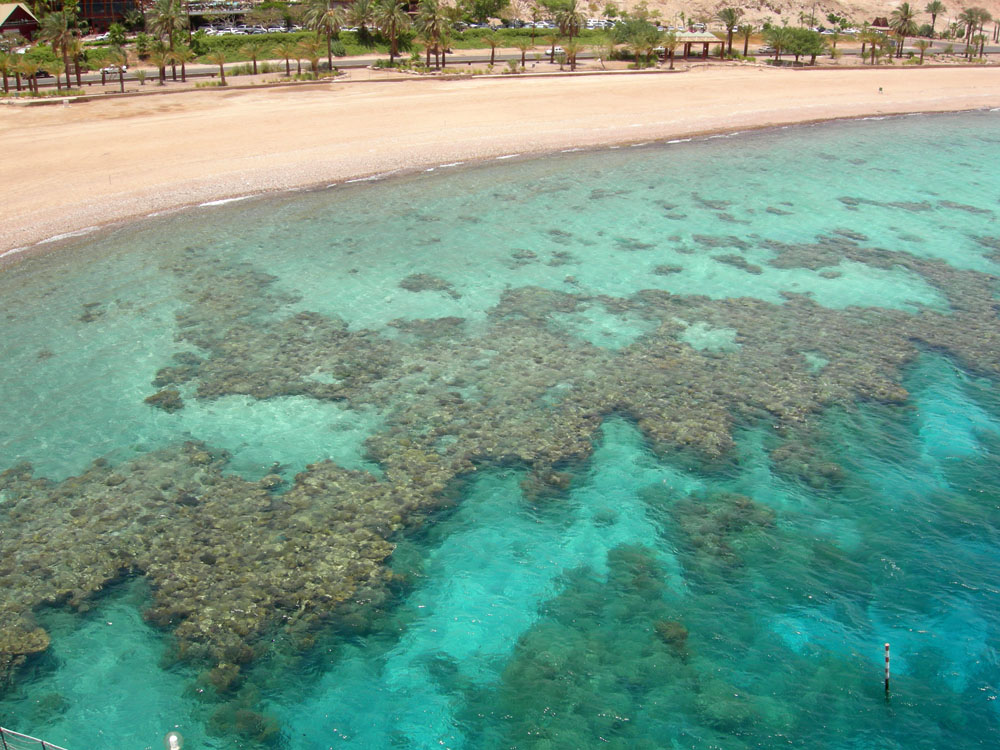
Eilat, coral reef

== See also ==
- Tourism in Israel
- Culture of Israel
- Archaeology of Israel
- Wildlife of Israel
