= Mount Carmel National Park =

National park in Israel

- פארק הכרמל
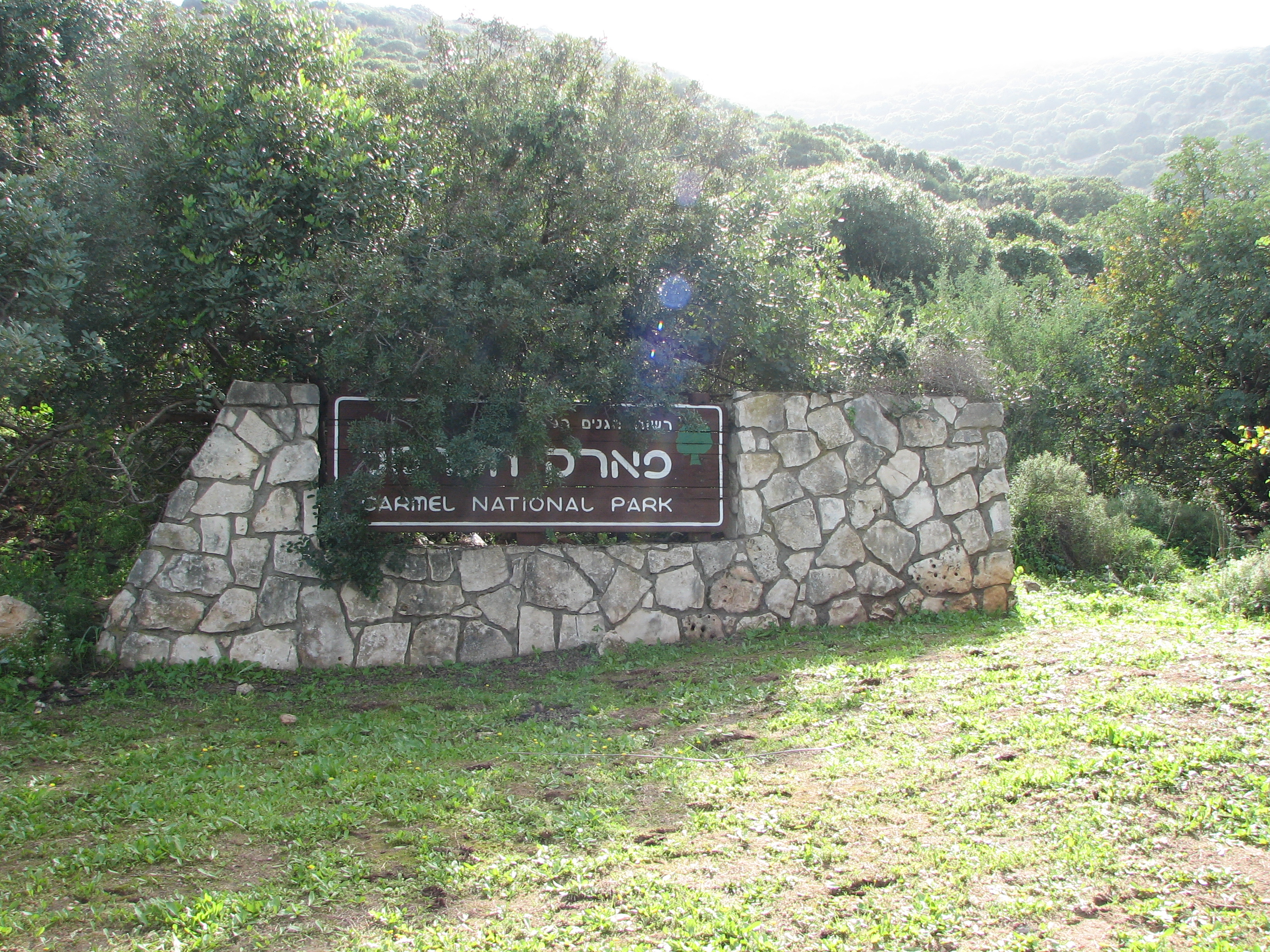
- The entrance to the park on Road 7212 near the town of Nesher
- Interactive map of Mount Carmel National Park
- Type: National park, biosphere reserve
- Location: Carmel mountain range, Israel
- Coordinates: 32.7554°N 35.0024°E
- Area: 10,000 hectares (25,000 acres)
- Established: 1960
- Operator: Israel Nature and Parks Authority
- Status: Open to public

Mount Carmel National Park (Hebrew: פארק הכרמל, Park HaKarmel) is Israel's largest national park, extending over most of the Carmel mountain range (Arabic: جبل الكرمل, Jabal al-Karmil), also known in Arabic as Mount Mar Elias (Arabic: جبل مار إلياس, Jabal Mār Ilyās, lit. 'Mount Saint Elias/Elijah') containing over 10,000 hectares of pine, eucalyptus, and cypress forest. The park has numerous bicycle and walking paths, dedicated nature reserves, and over 250 archaeological sites of prehistoric human habitations.

The park is one of the largest open spaces of northern Israel. It is a typical example of a Mediterranean ecosystem and includes a rich inventory of geological phenomena, prehistoric artifacts, biodiversity and landscapes. In 1996 it was recognized by UNESCO as a biosphere reserve.

== History ==
Mount Carmel has been home to human habitation since the prehistoric era, and the remains of ancient settlement have been uncovered in caves in the hillsides. For most of its long history, however, it remained sparsely populated and contained few towns.

At the end of the 15th century and in the first half of the 16th century, Druze began to emigrate from Lebanon, settling in the Carmel and leaving their mark on the landscape. They appropriated land for agricultural purposes and cut down trees for firewood. This logging grew considerably during the Ottoman period of rule in Palestine.

=== Mandatory Palestine ===
Under British Mandate rule, the practice of logging was stopped completely. The surrounding areas of Nahal Kelah and Nahal Galim were declared nature reserves, and British authorities placed forest guards in the area. The guards lived in stone buildings in the park and patrolled the area mounted on donkeys and mules. The British even paved paths for their convenience.

In 1927, Arthur Ruppin turned to Colonel E. R. Sawer, director of the Department of Agriculture, Forests, and Fisheries, and suggested that he declare the entire area protected natural park. This appeal was made as part of the activities of the Israel Land Development Company (ILDC). His proposal included the following:

1. A prohibition on logging and herding.
2. A prohibition on hunting deer and birds.
3. The definition of an area of hundreds of dunams to be used to feed local animals; ILDC would allocate the land for this purpose from the territories under its ownership.
4. Carmel areas not being used for agriculture would undergo a process of afforestation.

Sawer accepted Ruppin's ideas, suggesting the Nahal Lotem area on the western slopes of the Carmel, and conditioned the implementation of the program only on government and not private land so as not to have to compensate landowners for private areas. The project was designed by Richard Kauffmann who suggested instead the large areas south of Haifa. In the end, however, Ruffin's original idea was not realized because of budgetary reasons.

There were many challenges to the idea of making the Carmel as an open green space. In addition to the threat of logging, shepherds used the mountain as a pasture zone for intensive grazing. At the same time, various developers were looking for scenic areas in which to build new neighborhoods and communities. In Haifa, neighborhoods were built on green areas of the mountain, such as Ahuza, built in the 1920s. Other initiatives (some at the encouragement of national institutions) were the "Carmel Forest" development by the Carmel Investments company under the direction of Joseph Levy and George Hertz-Shikmoni for the construction of a settlement on the southern ridge of the mountain. In 1934, they purchased an area of 600 hectares. Another initiative was an effort of the ILDC in the late 1930s to establish a residential neighborhood called "Summit of Mount Carmel" south of what is today the University of Haifa. The program consisting of 300 hectares was approved in 1941. Another threat to the Carmel were quarries that had sprung up on the mountain, the largest being that of Nesher Israel Cement Enterprises, where roads were paved for construction and quarrying.

=== State of Israel ===
With the founding of the state, an need was created to absorb the masses of immigrants that were arriving to the land. In responses to the crisis, pressure was put on Israel's green areas. The planning wing of the Ministry of Interior began to form a comprehensive plan for Israel's lands, one that would deal with the issue of nature reserves. This framework would set up the plan for the Carmel National Park. The program was approved in 1952, amended in 1956, and finally signed in 1960. In 1950, Prime Minister David Ben-Gurion appointed a commission to consolidate the various suggestions to protect Israel's open spaces. The commission recommended declaring several of these areas national parks, among them the area of Mount Carmel.

In 1962, Agriculture Minister Moshe Dayan instructed the Israel Land Administration to set up a committee to recommend areas for nature reserves. The committee, headed by Nachman Alexandron of the Jewish National Fund, recommended the establishment of 93 nature reserves, including the Carmel area. At the time the committee was created, the Haifa District Regional Outline Plan had set aside an area of 10,000 hectares in the Carmel to be used for nature preserves. Before the plan could be put into action, however, it was annulled when the "New Regional Plan for the Galilee" was published in 1963.

Over the years, private landowners struggled to remove their land from the confines of the future park. One such example is the battle waged during the fifties and sixties by the "Union of Settlers" to keep their hold on the areas of the "Carmel Forest" development. An opposite fight was conducted by the Society for the Protection of Nature in Israel. In 1956, the company held its first national conference. During the conference participants visited the Beit Oren area, marking the beginning of "the struggle for Carmel," in which, parallel to processes to obtain protected status for the area, the area saw a swell in the activities of land dealers and the construction of private homes by individual landowners.

To stop this activity, the government decided at its meeting on May 19, 1963 to freeze all construction plans in Carmel and prepare a new plan and set up a government commission to determine in which areas the freeze should apply. The government's decision led the Haifa District's regional committee for planning and construction to freeze six plans for construction on the Carmel. On the 9th of June of that year, the committee presented its recommendations to the government, whereupon they decided to freeze construction on an area of 9,900 hectares that were government-owned and another 1,000 hectares that were privately owned which were in planning stages, but where construction had not yet begun, all while compensating the land owners for their cooperation.

In 1963, "The National Parks and Nature Reserves Law" was approved, beginning the process of the declaring the different areas in accordance with the new law. At the same time, the ministerial committee dealing with the Carmel began to explore the possibility of exchanging private land in the area for private land in another area, as well as determining the area of the park. The committee recommended the removal of the quarries and the University of Haifa outside the park, the transfer of the Damon prison, a prohibition on paving highways, working the land and more. The committee's recommendations were approved in July 1964.

In 1965, the plan for the park was made public. Following this, over a thousand objections were filed. In May 1967, the committee decided to postpone the building of cities for the most part, determined the scope of compensation and approved the plan with minor modifications. Following the outbreak of the Six-Day War, attention to approving the plan was postponed. In September 1969, the Minister of Interior signed off on the program, starting the process of land expropriation and compensation. Other owners were left with ownership of land in the park with restrictions on land use resulting from the declaration of the nature reserve. On July 1, 1971, the Interior Minister declared the area as a nature reserve and national park. The announcement also included the establishment of an administrative arrangement to care for the park.

Throughout the last decades of the 20th century, the importance of the natural woodlands that surrounded the urban settlement was not lost on the Society for the Protection of Nature and the Parks Authority, and they were able to persuade the state to preserve them in their natural form. In 1996, the park was recognized as a biosphere reserve by the international organization UNESCO. The area of the reserve is 59,864 hectares.

== Hai Bar Nature Reserve ==
The Hai Bar is a 600 hectare nature reserve in the area of the park near Nahal Galim. Its mission is the restoration and reinstatement of populations of animals that were made extinct from the area or are on the brink of extinction. Hai Bar raises such animals like wild goat, Persian fallow deer, Roe deer, and Palestine mountain gazelle, among others. They attempt to encourage reproduction in captivity, and habituate the animals to life in the wild by raising them in large enclosures until they are able to be released. They also have a similar procedure for birds of prey, such as eagles.

== Challenges ==
=== Fires ===
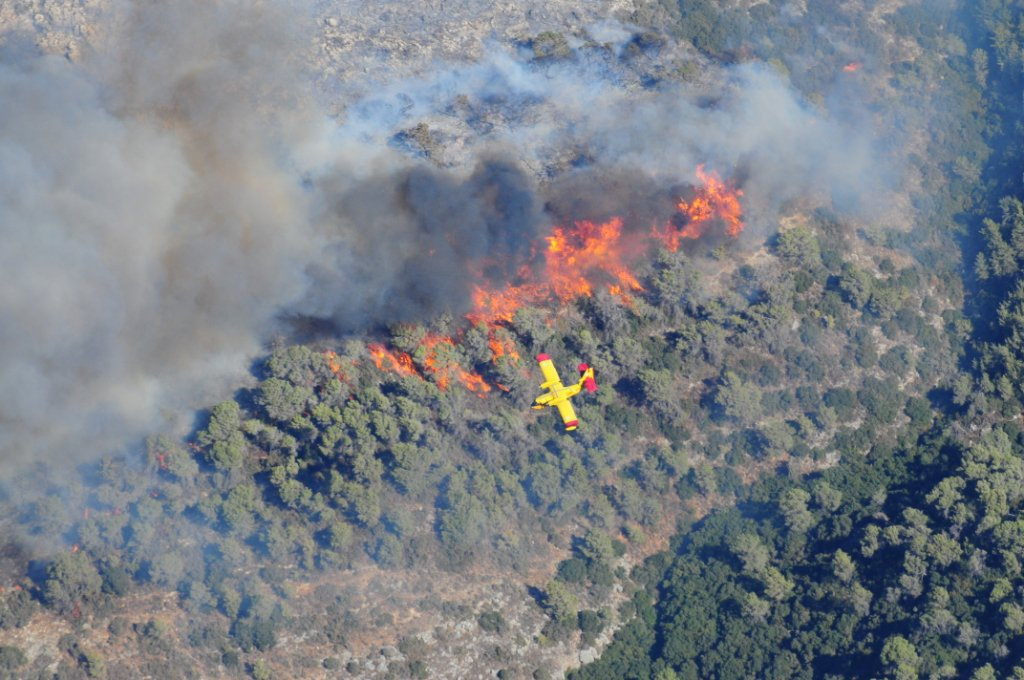
A fire in December 2010

There have been many fires in the park since its establishment, of both natural and human causes, intentional and accidental. Numerous investigations conducted by the fire and police departments concluded that many fires were in fact arson, committed by groups attempting to bring down the environmental value of the area in order to more quickly receive permits for building and development.

In general, fires are an important and central part of ecological disturbance in a Mediterranean ecosystem, and because of a long history of human settlement in the Mediterranean Basin, the vegetation of the Mediterranean has adapted itself well to effective regeneration after fire. Although some elements, like old trees, might disappear without returning, a developed grove of typical Carmel vegetation will restore itself entirely a few decades after the last fire.

Ecologists, nature reservists and farmers continue to disagree over the amount of damage and benefits that occurs in area like Carmel Park. There are those that say that fires are an essential part of the ecosystem, contributing to biodiversity and variety in landscape, preventing uniform and continuous woods and instead creating colorful landscapes and encouraging the flowering of geophytes which require direct light. Given the controversy, however, the Israel Nature and Parks Authority is taking a clear position of avoiding fire events as much as possible (not using controlled burns), and when fires do break out, they are extinguished as soon as possible to minimize the damage to the area.

Recent large fires include those of 1983, which destroyed around 330 hectares, and 1989, consuming around 600 hectares. In December 2010, the park suffered its largest fire which destroyed close to 35 square kilometers (3,500 hectares), an area containing millions of trees.

=== Park boundaries ===
The location of the park and its proximity to many large towns (e.g., Haifa, Osfiya, and Daliat El Carmel) puts the park under threat of expansion by those towns and the construction of highways in its bounds. Illegal construction by these villages presents an acute problem to the park and puts pressure on the park authority. That pressure, which has even included death threats to inspectors and park management, led the National Parks Authority to sign an agreement ceding large areas of the park to the villages. Today, a similar struggle exists for the surrounding mountain.

In Haifa, there are threats for the construction of real estate projects in the area of Nahal Nadar, the areas near Hai Bar and south of the University of Haifa, and the neighborhood of Danya. Recently real estate developers have been trying to revive the plan to establish a residential tower (about 1,000 units) and highway. The Society for the Protection of Nature and the student organization Green Course have been organizing to save the park.

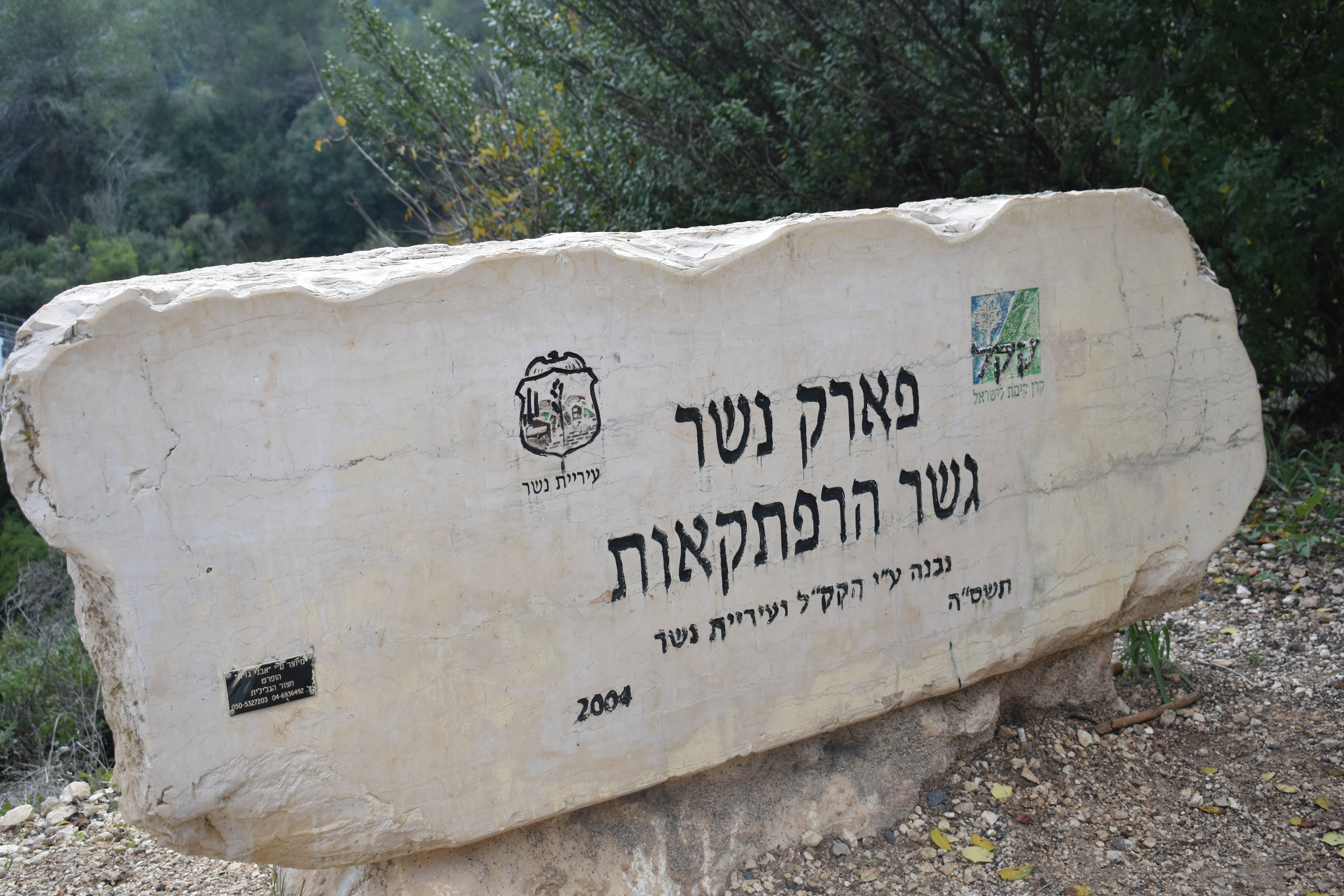
Welcome to Park Nesher

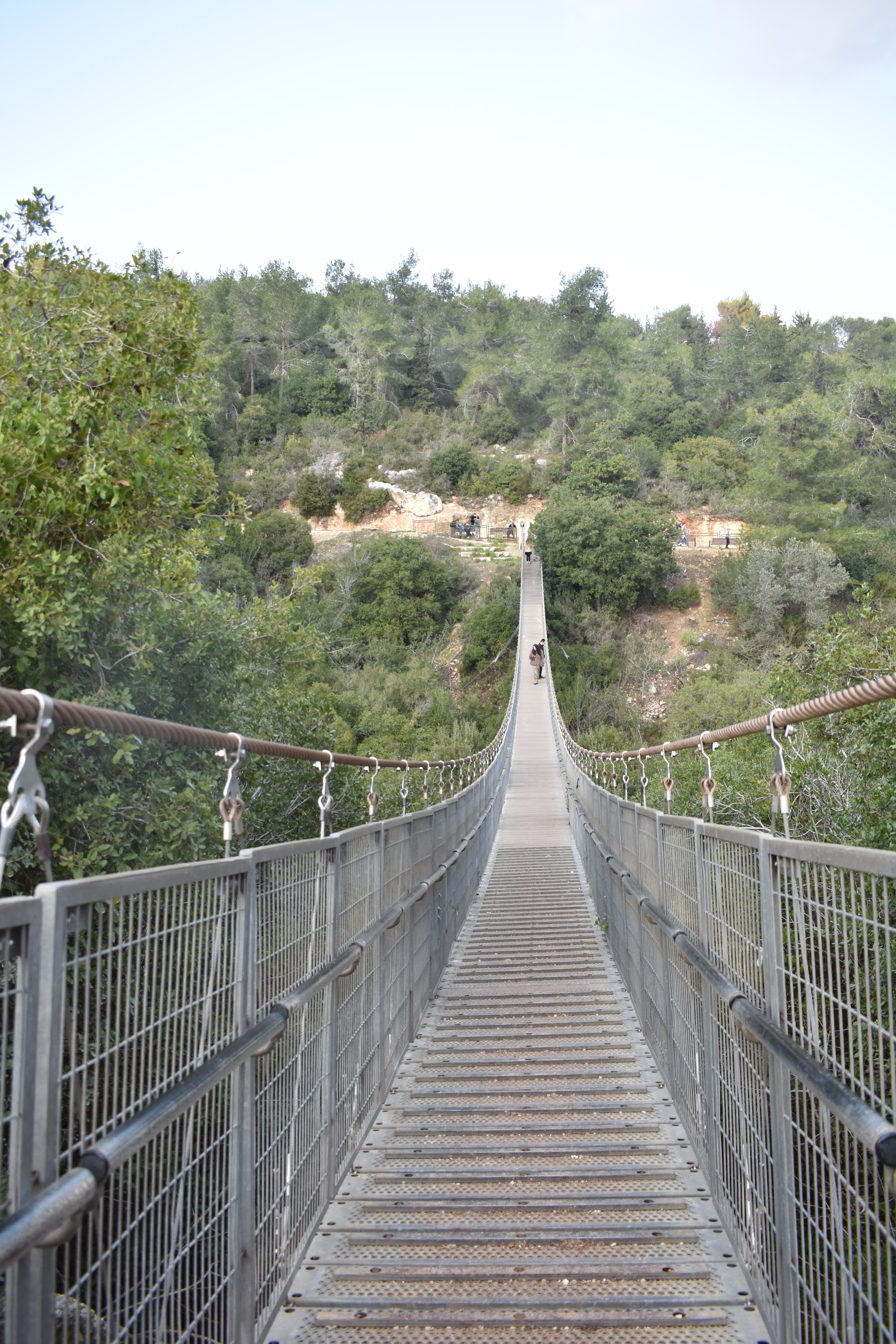
Hanging Bridge in Park Nesher near Haifa, Israel

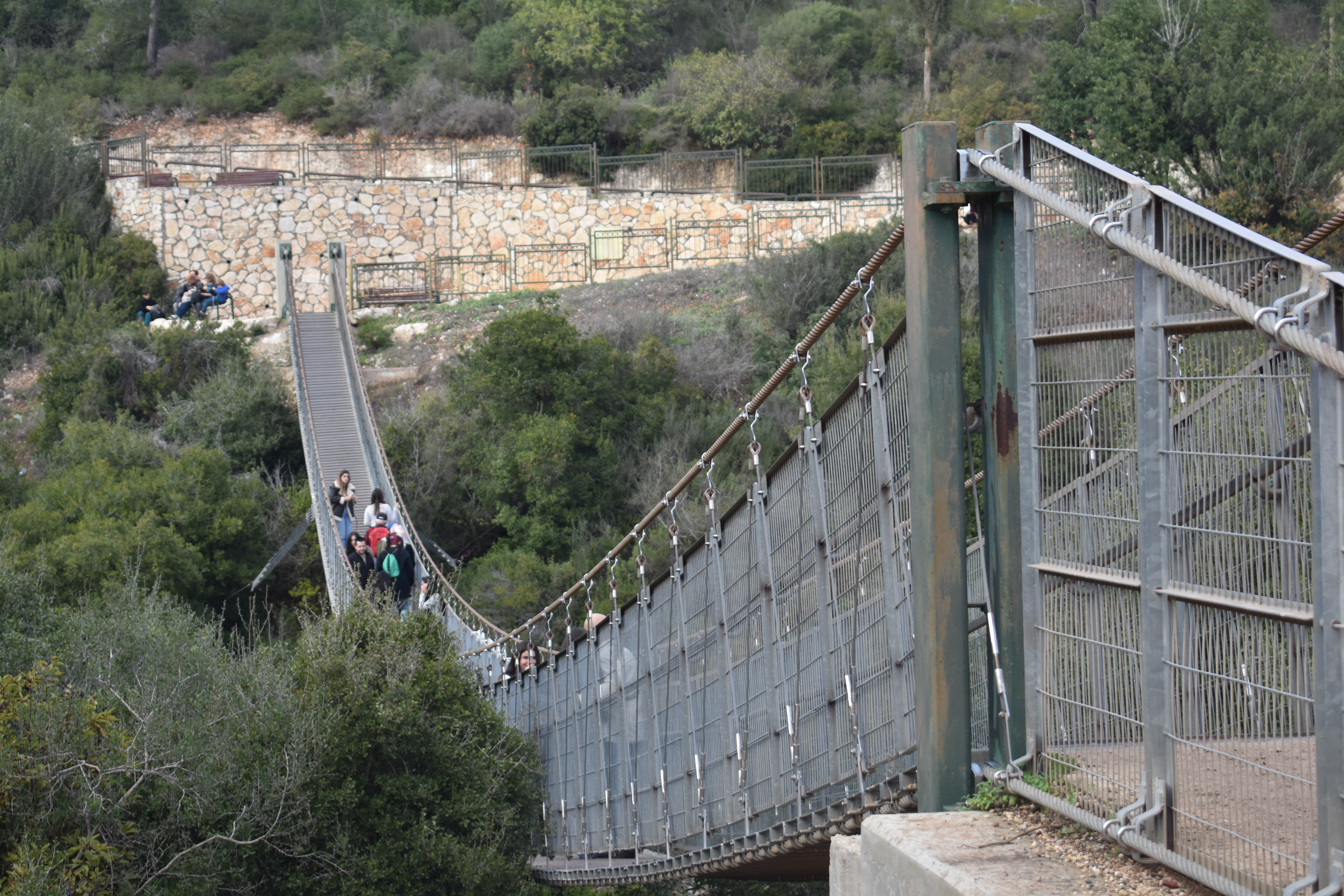
Hanging Bridge in Park Nesher near Haifa, Israel

=== Invasive species ===
Several species of invasive plants are displacing natural vegetation in Carmel Park and damaging its value. Most of the invasions are near towns; in the remote area there is almost no impact of invasive species, but this situation could change without elimination of existing invasions and prevention of further ones.

The main invasive species in the park are:

- Bermuda Buttercup (Oxalis pes-caprae)
- Tree of heaven (Ailanthus altissima)
- Hopbush (Dodonaea viscosa)

== See also ==
- Horvat Sumaqa
- Nahal Me'arot Nature Reserve
