= Tel Anafa =

Archaeological site in Israel

- תל אנפה (Hebrew)
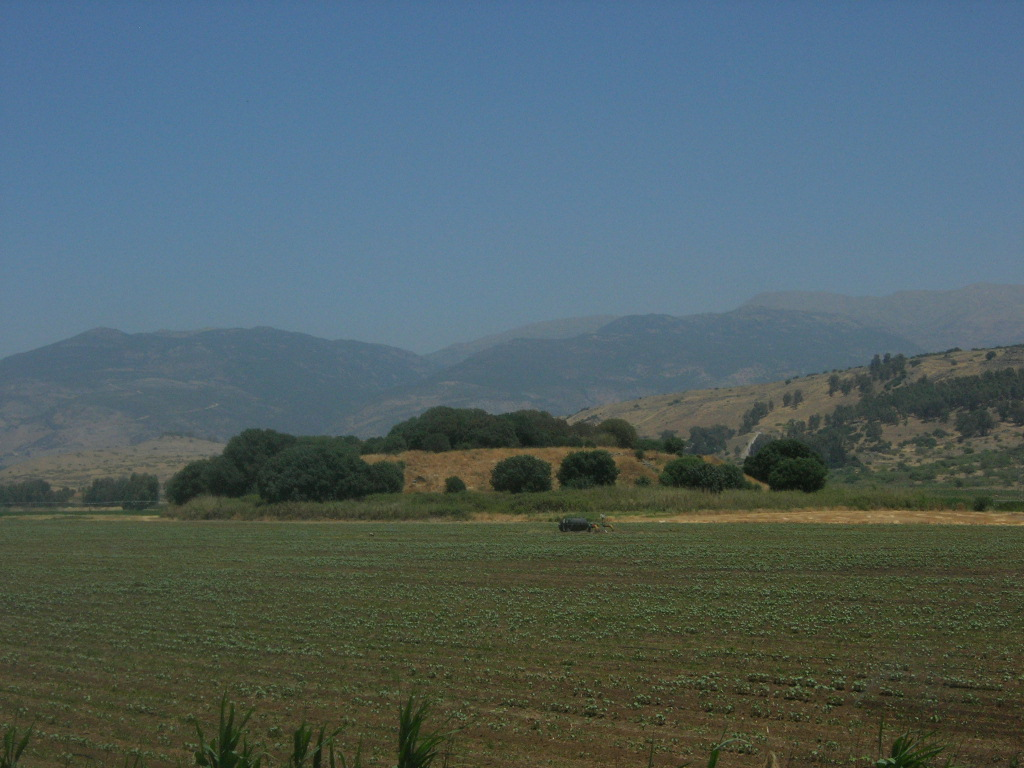
- Tel Anafa, from the south

- Location within Israel
- 33.177164°N 35.644694°E
- Periods: Middle and Late Bronze Age, Iron Age, Hellenistic period, early Roman period
- Location: Israel

History
- Abandoned: Iron Age (temporarily, later resettled); 80–75 BCE (temporarily, later resettled); mid-1st century CE (finally)

Site notes
- Area: 11 dunams

Tel Anafa (Hebrew: תל אנפה, lit. "Egret hill" Arabic: تل الأخضر, romanized: Tel el-Hader, lit. "The green hill") is an archaeological site and nature reserve in the Upper Galilee, Israel.

== Occupational history ==
Tel Anafa was inhabited from the Early Bronze Age through the early Roman period, but most of the significant archaeological remains are from the Hellenistic period.

The site was resettled in the late Hellenistic period, in the last quarter of the second century BCE, during which a large building with a central courtyard was constructed. It was abandoned around 80–75 BCE but resettled in the last decade of the same century, during the tetrarchy of Herod Philip. This early Roman phase continued until the mid-1st century CE, when the site was abandoned once more.

The land on which it is situated has since 1984 been part of an 11-dunam nature reserve.

== Small findings ==
Coins and amphora handles from the late 4th to the 2nd century were unearthed.

Cooking pans and lids imported from Italy were found in late Hellenistic levels, dating from c. 100–80 BCE. These items are an early example for commercial exchange between Italy and the Levant before the Roman conquest of the region.

== See also ==
- National parks and nature reserves of Israel
