= Pa'ar Cave =

Cave in Israel

Pa'ar Cave Nature Reserve
- מערת פער
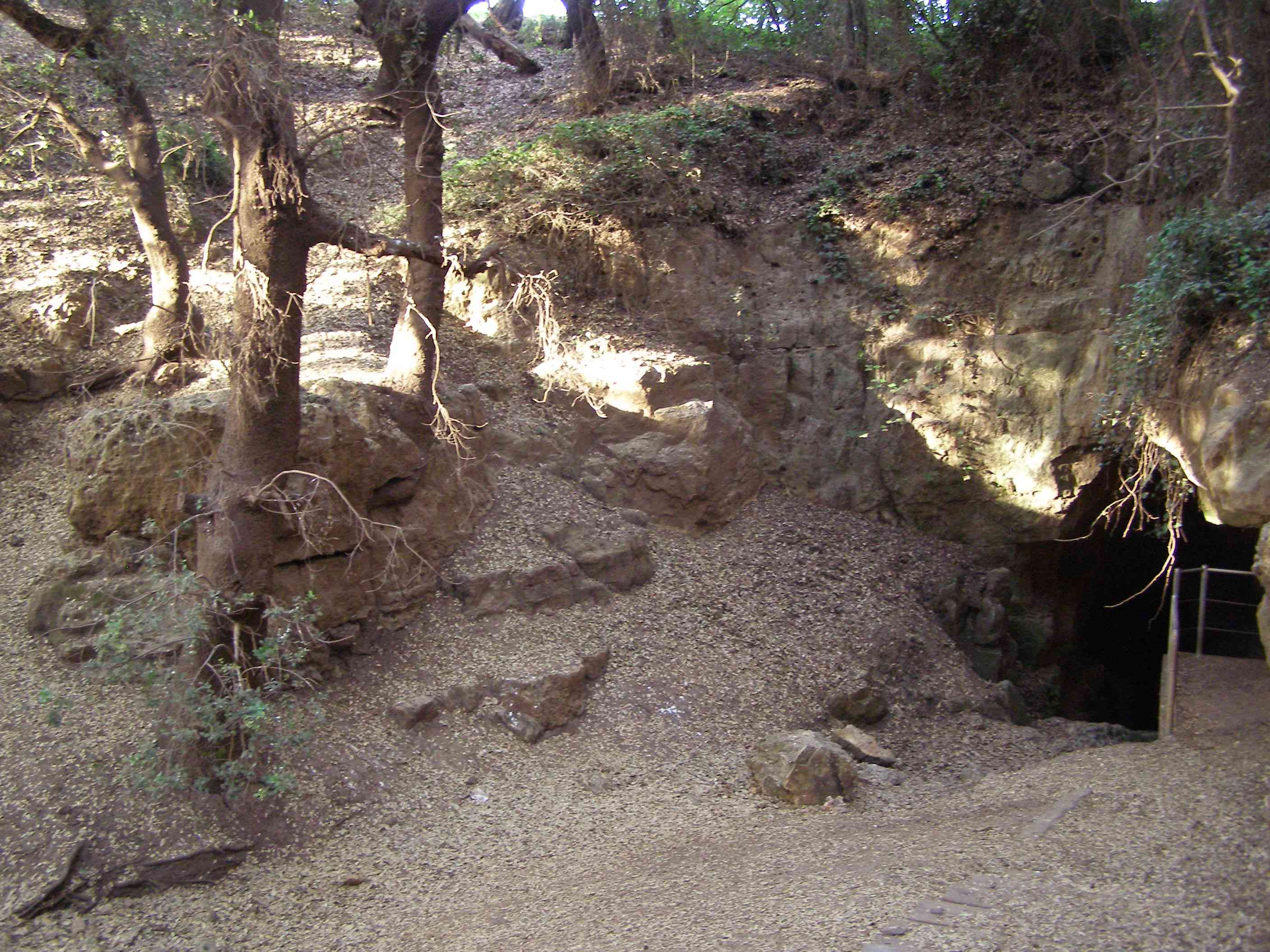
- Pa'ar Cave

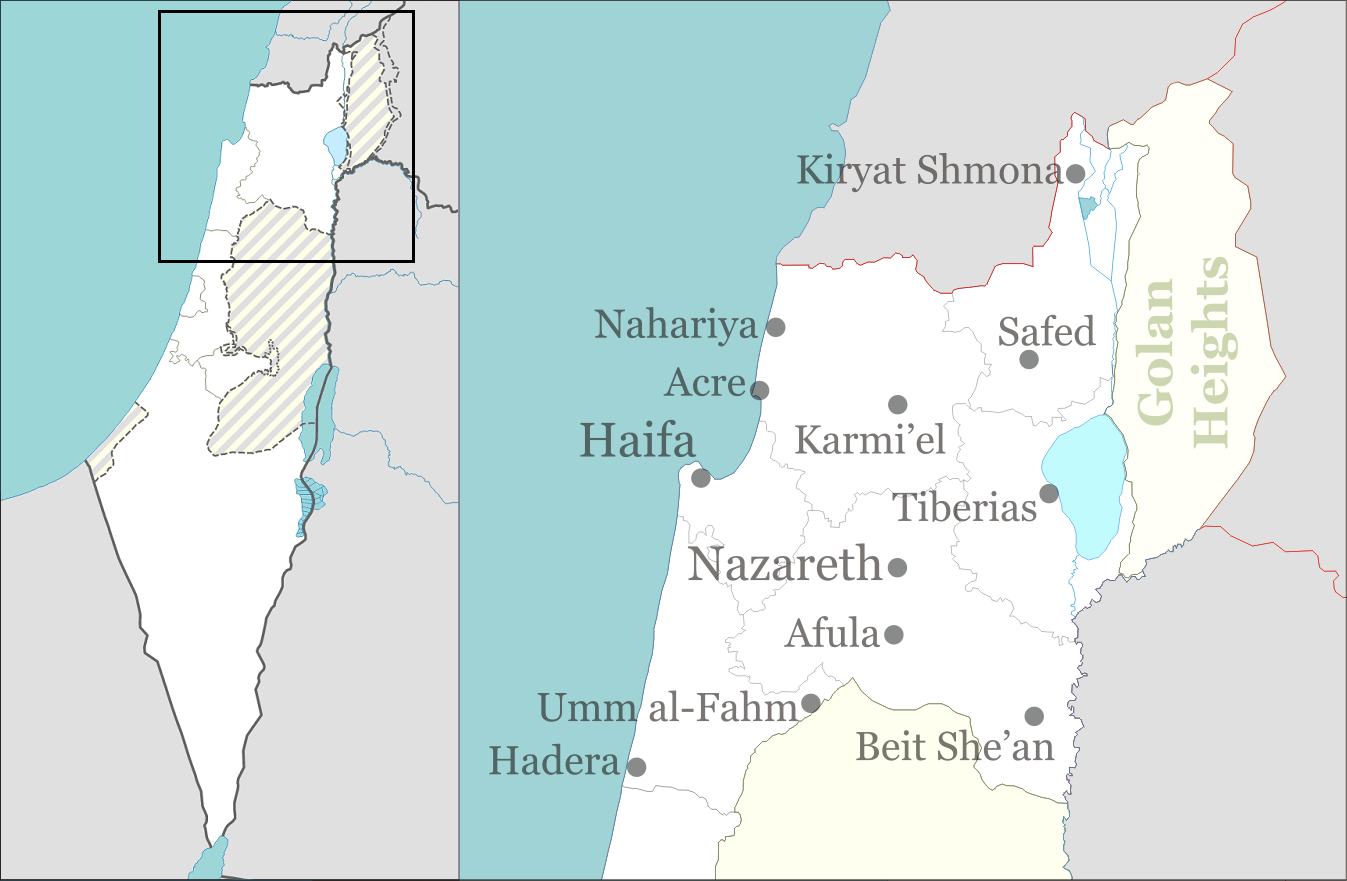
- Location within Northern Haifa region of Israel
- Location: Upper Galilee, Israel
- Nearest city: Sasa
- Coordinates: 33°1′51.63″N 35°23′9.28″E
- Area: 14 dunams (0.014 km^{2}; 0.0054 sq mi)
- Established: 1967
- Governing body: Israel Nature and Parks Authority

Pa'ar Cave (Hebrew: מערת פער) is a karstic sinkhole in the Upper Galilee, Israel.

== History ==
The cave is located between the Adir peak (part of the Meron range), and kibbutz Sasa. The sinkhole channels the water flowing from the Pa'ar stream to groundwater level.

The cave is part of a 14-dunam nature reserve, declared in 1967, that bears its name. The reserve is home to Palestine Oak (Quercus calliprinos) and Quercus infectoria oak trees, Hawthorn trees (Crataegus azarolus aronia), Dog Rose (Rosa canina) bushes, and Sternbergia bulb flowers.

== See also ==
- List of caves in Israel
- Geology of Israel
