= Hurshat Tal =

National park and nature reserve in Israel

- חורשת טל
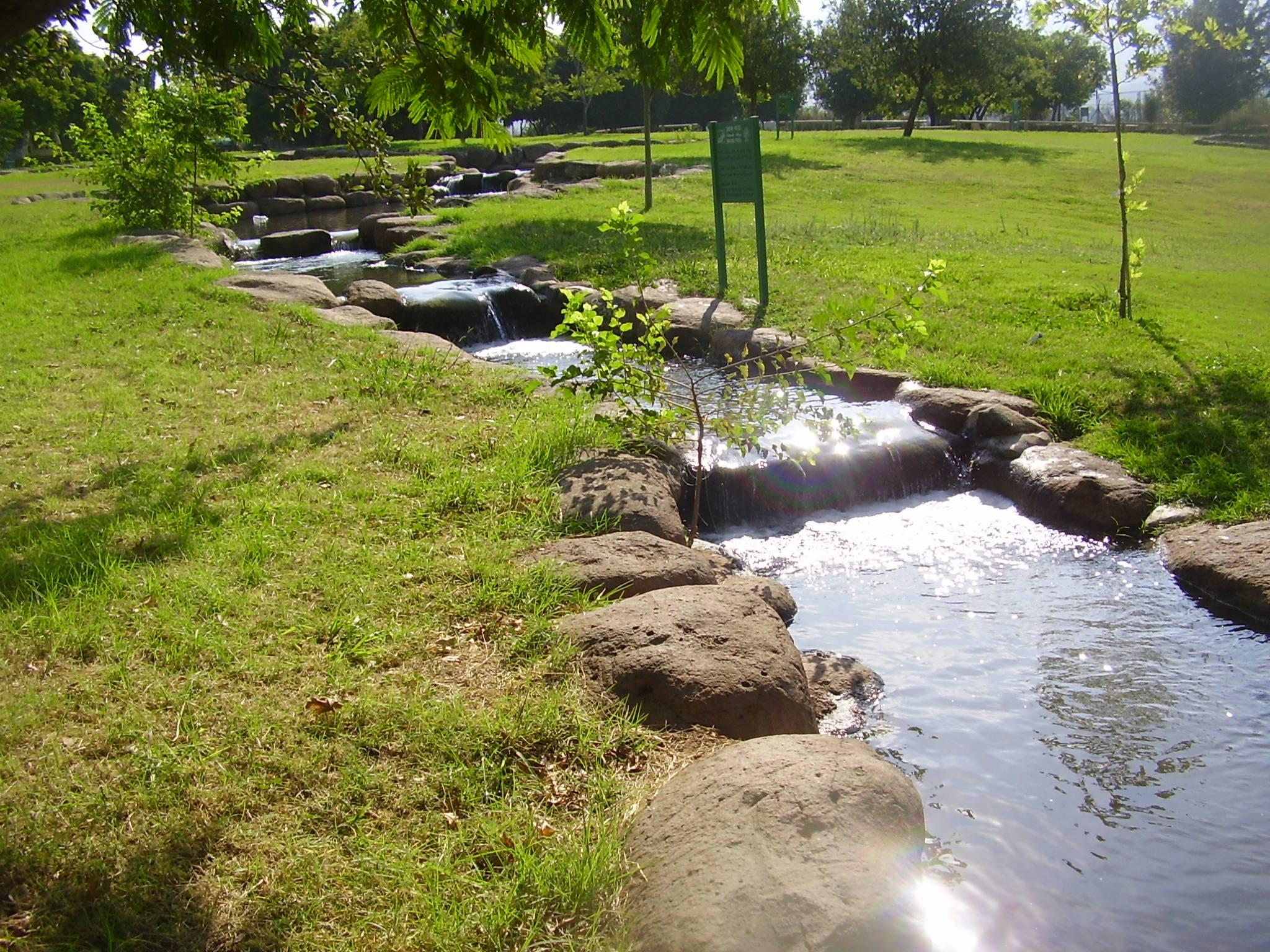
- Hurshat Tal brook

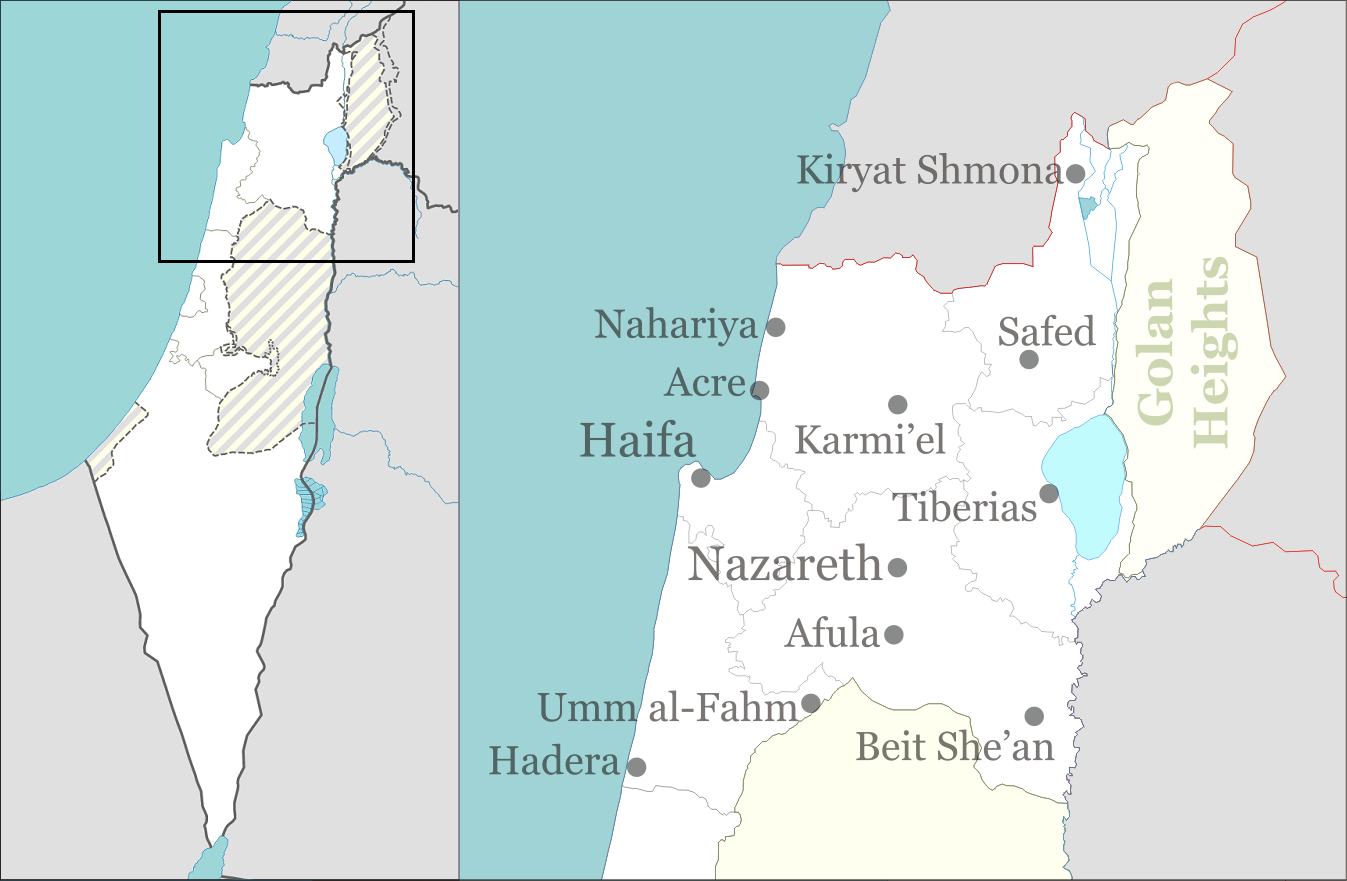
- Location within Northern Haifa region of Israel
- Location: Northern District, Israel
- Coordinates: 33°13′13.74″N 35°37′45.65″E
- Area: 765 dunams (national park), 107 dunams (nature reserve)
- Established: 1968

Hurshat Tal (Hebrew: חורשת טל, lit. "Dew Grove") is a national park and nature reserve in the Northern District of Israel. In 1968, 765 dunams were declared national park lands (visitor facilities occupying approximately 250 dunams) and 107 dunams were declared a nature reserve.

== National Park ==
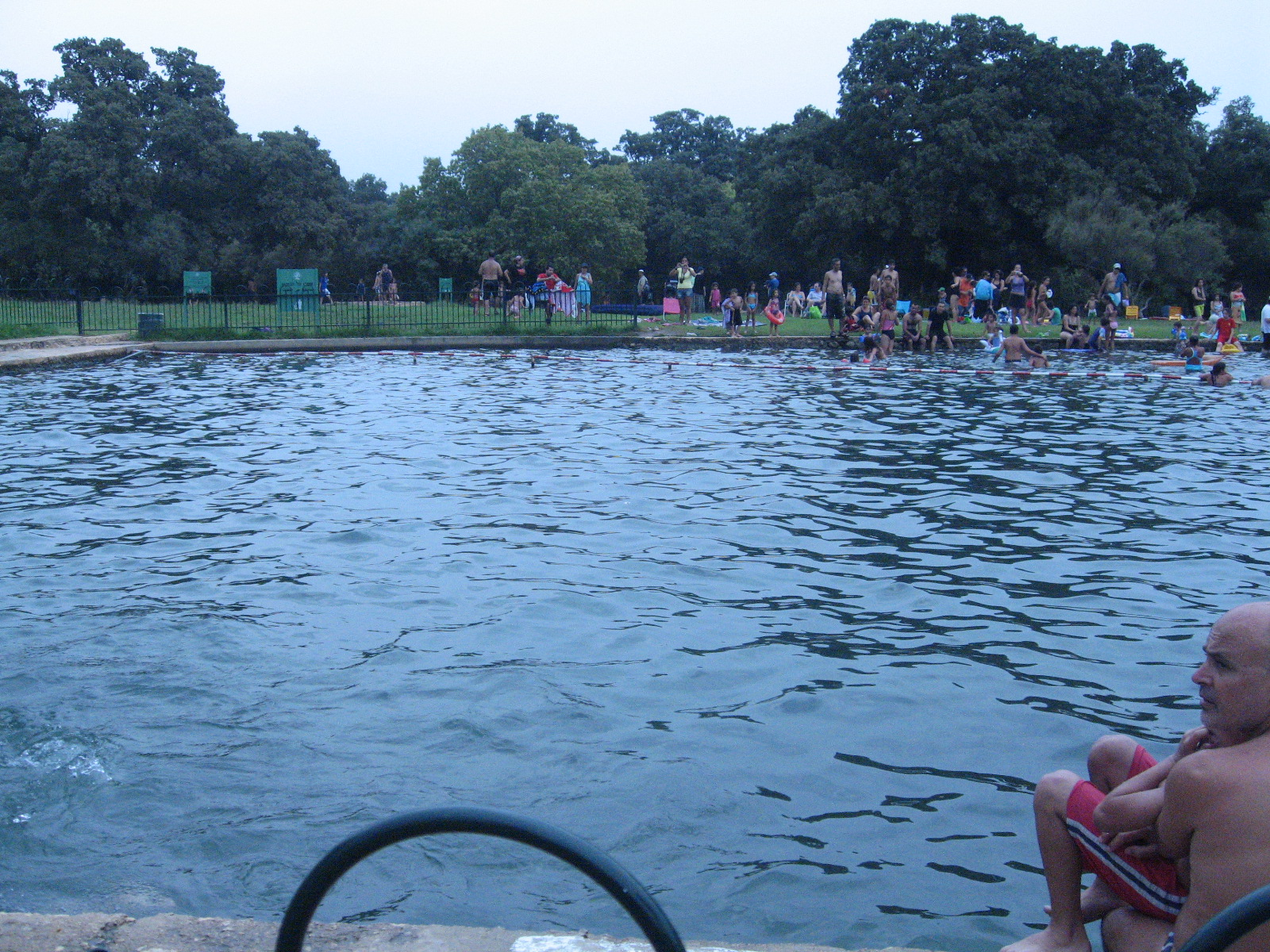
Hurshat Tal pool

Hurshat Tal is located on Highway 99, east of Kiryat Shmona, in the northern part of the Hula Valley. The recreation and camping grounds offer bungalows and cabins. A stream branching from the Dan River crosses the site, feeding a swimming pool with water slides. A fishing park is also open to visitors.

The Hebrew name of the site is taken from Psalms 133:3 referring to the "dew of Hermon".

== Nature Reserve ==
The reserve was declared mainly to protect the 240 old Valonia oak trees (Quercus macrolepis). These trees survived for many years as part of a local Muslim holy site. Some of the trees are 350–400 years old. Local folklore tells that ten of Muhammad's escorts stopped nearby to rest, but could not find trees to which to tie their horses. They stuck their sticks into the ground, which became the origin of the trees in the area. The story is reflected in the Arabic name for the site, Sejrat el-Asara ("Grove of the Ten").

== See also ==
- Tourism in Israel
- Geography of Israel
- Nature reserves in Israel
