= Israel Nature and Parks Authority =

Israeli government body for national parks

- Flag

Agency overview
- Formed: April 1998; 28 years ago
- Headquarters: Jerusalem, Israel
- Employees: About 1800, out of which 800 permanent
- Annual budget: 516,470 NIS (2021)
- Agency executive: Raya Shurki, Director
- Parent department: Ministry of Environmental Protection

The Israel Nature and Parks Authority (Hebrew: רשות הטבע והגנים, Rashut Hateva Vehaganim; Arabic: سلطة الطبيعة والحدائق, romanized: Sulṭat al-Ṭabīʻah wa-al-Ḥadāʼiq) is an Israeli government organization that manages nature reserves and national parks in Israel, the Golan Heights and parts of the West Bank. The organization was founded in April 1998, merging two organizations (The National Parks Authority and the Nature Reserves Authority) that had managed the nature reserves and national parks separately since 1964. The director of the Authority is Raya Shurki.

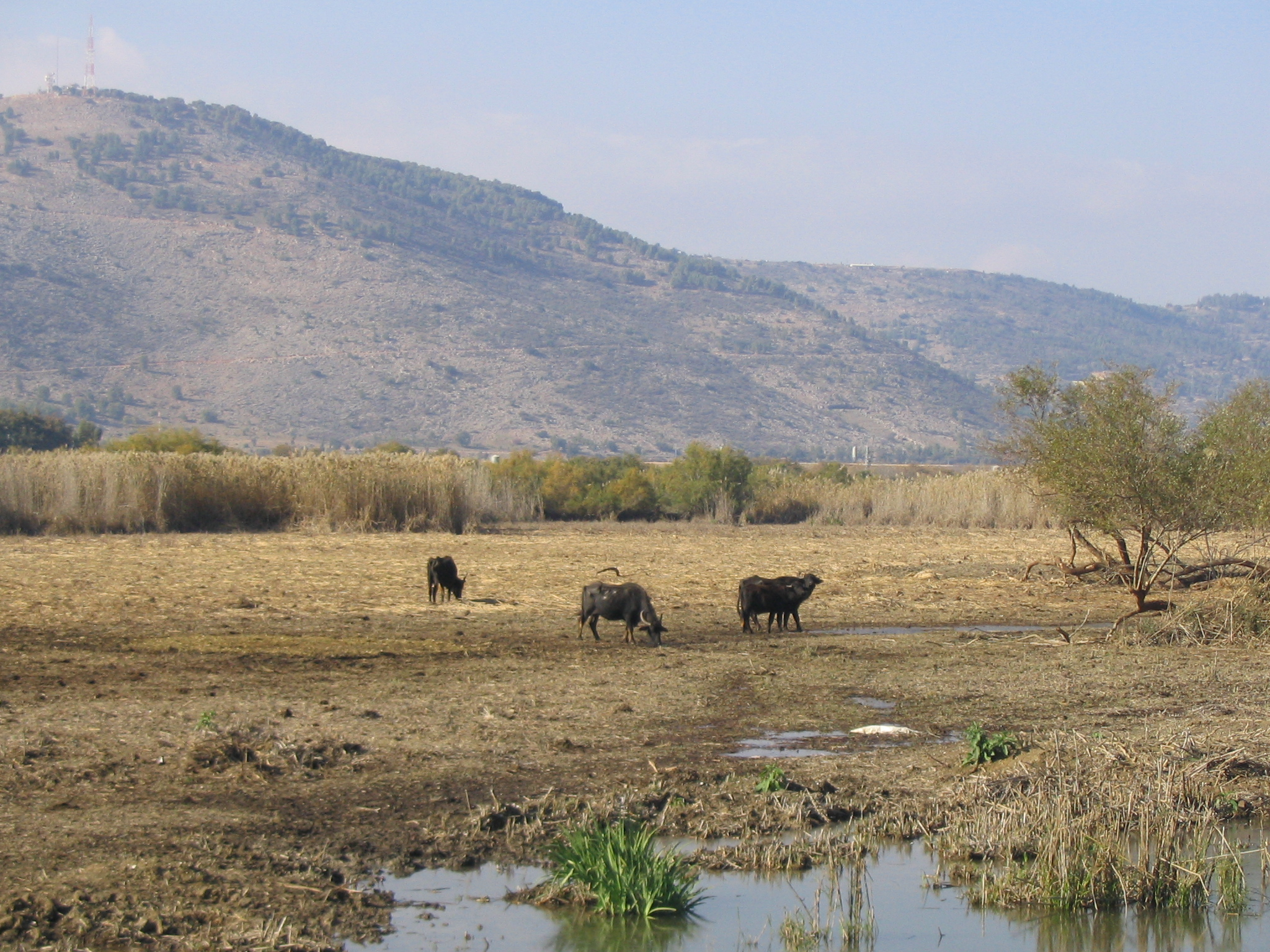
Hula Valley nature reserve

The symbol of the Israel Nature and Parks Authority is the ibex, a mountain goat similar to the antelope. One of the missions of the Israel Nature and Parks Authority is enforcing Israeli wildlife protection laws.

== Regions ==
As of 2015, the Israel Nature and Parks Authority was the overseer of 400 nature reserves and 81 national parks, covering over 20 percent of Israel’s land mass. The coverage of the Authority has grown fairly rapidly. For example, in 2007 the Authority oversaw only 69 national parks and 190 nature reserves – a doubling of reserves in only eight years.

The parks and nature reserves are divided into six regions:

- Golan Heights, Sea of Galilee, and Galilee
- Lower Galilee and their valleys
- Mount Carmel, the coast, and central Israel
- Judean Desert and The Dead Sea
- The Negev
- Eliat and the Arava

== Notable projects ==
=== Griffon vulture conservation ===
The Israel Nature and Parks Authority has led significant efforts to protect the endangered griffon vulture population, particularly through the "Under Our Wing" project, which focuses on breeding vultures in captivity and releasing them into the wild. The project also sets up feeding stations to help vultures avoid poisoned carcasses, a major threat. These initiatives, alongside actions to prevent intentional poisoning by farmers, have contributed to the recovery of the griffon vulture population in Israel, a critical species for the region's ecosystem.

=== Large-scale reforestation efforts at Mount Carmel ===
In the wake of the devastating Carmel Forest fire of 2010, the Israel Nature and Parks Authority, along with Jewish National Fund, launched large-scale reforestation efforts to restore the damaged ecosystem. These include planting native trees, creating firebreaks, and clearing debris to prevent future fires. Volunteers from Israel and around the world helped replant thousands of trees, while experts are monitoring long-term ecological impacts to ensure the forest's health and resilience. The project has made significant strides in rehabilitating the region and reducing the risk of future wildfires.

== Criticism ==
The Society for the Protection of Nature in Israel has criticized decisions of the Nature and Parks Authority's policies on several occasions, claiming that they have harmed nature reserves in various ways. Let the Animals Live organization has also claimed that the Authority was harming animals.

In 2007, scientists and nature conservation organizations opposed the extension of CEO Eli Amitay's appointment for a second term, citing claims regarding the Authority's conservation policies during his first term, but the government approved the appointment nonetheless. In 2011, Minister of Environmental Protection Gilad Erdan sought to depose Amitay, claiming that he is acting against public interest. As a result, Amitay retired a year earlier than planned. In December of the same year, Shaul Goldstein, head of the Gush Etzion Regional Council was appointed as CEO by a government committee.

In October 2017, the Authority came under public criticism when a visitor to Avshalom Cave observed that none of the instructional material in the cave contained an estimate of its age, and a local guide claimed that this was due to pressure by the ultra-Orthodox population, which was later confirmed by media outlets. After the affair, the authority announced that the material will be corrected and the CEO "called for an examination of all instructional material to ensure that it conforms to scientific truth".

== Heads of Nature Reserves Authority ==
- Uzi Paz, 1964–1965
- Avraham Yoffe, 1965–1978
- Adir Shapira, 1973–1981
- Uri Baidatz, 1982–1990
- Dan Perry, 1990–1995
- Yeshayahu Erez, 1995–1997
- Aharon Vardi, 1997–1998

== Heads of National Parks Authority ==
- Yaakov Yanai, 1964–1978
- Zvi Barzel, 1978–1984
- Mordechai Ben-Porat, 1984–1994
- Israel Gilad, 1994–1997
- Aharon Vardi, 1997–1998

== Heads of the Nature and Parks Authority ==
- Aharon Vardi, 1998–2002
- Eli Amitay, 2002–2011
- Shaul Goldstein, 2011–2021
- Raya Shurki, 2022–

== See also ==
- List of national parks and nature reserves of Israel
- Tourism in Israel
