= Southern Golan Natural Region =

Coordinates: 32°50′41″N 35°47′30″E

- Natural Region
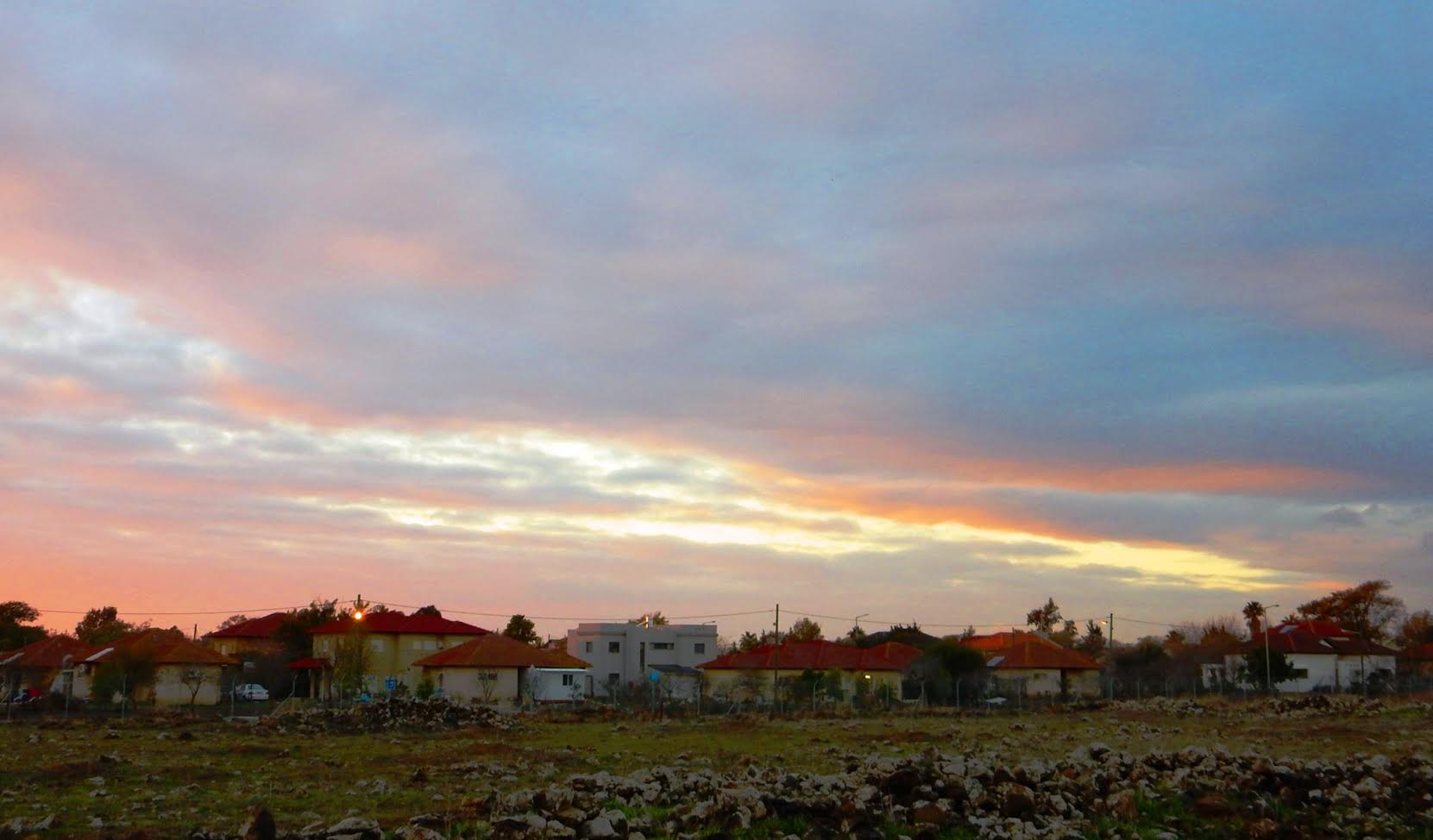
- View of Haspin, the largest community in the Southern Golan Natural Region
- Interactive map of Southern Golan Natural Region
- Country: Israel
- District: Northern
- Subdistrict: Golan
- Largest City: Haspin

Area
  - Total: 281 km^{2} (108 sq mi)

Population (2024)
  - Total: 11,445

Ethnicity
  - Jews and others: 96.1%
  - Arabs: 0.1%

The Southern Golan Natural Region is a natural region in the Golan Subdistrict, which is administered by Israel as part of its Northern District. Haspin is the largest town in the natural region.

== Geography ==
Districts, Subdistricts and Natural Regions of the State of Israel, 2018

As its name suggests, the natural region consists of the southern portion of the Golan Heights, which geologically is a basaltic plateau. It borders Jordan to the south and the Sea of Galilee to the west. It has an area of 281 km^{2}. Most communities in the Southern Golan Natural Region, including the largest town, Haspin, are located along or near Highway 98, the major road running through the southern Golan Heights. All 14 communities in the natural region are part of the Golan Regional Council. It is the least populous of the four natural regions in the Golan Subdistrict.

== Demographics ==
The vast majority of residents of the Southern Golan Natural Region are Jewish. There are no Arab towns in the natural region.

Historical population
Year	Pop.	±%
1983	2,600	—
1995	4,400	+69.2%
2008	6,300	+43.2%
2022	10,745	+70.6%
2024	11,445	+6.5%

== Administrative local authorities ==
Cities	Local Councils	Villages
[None]	[None]	Golan: Afik; Avnei Eitan; Bnei Yehuda; Eliad; Geshur; Giv'at Yoav; Haspin; Kfar Haruv; Mevo Hama; Metzar; Natur; Ne'ot Golan; Nov; Ramat Magshimim

== Voting Patterns ==
In the 2022 election, 46.4 percent of voters in the natural region voted for the parties of the right-wing coalition led by Benjamin Netanyahu, while 44.3 percent voted for the parties of the center-left coalition led by Yair Lapid and 0.2 percent voted for the Arab parties.

In the 2026 election, 45 percent of voters in the natural region voted for the parties of the right-wing coalition led by Benjamin Netanyahu, while 44 percent voted for the parties of the center-left coalition led by Gadi Eisenkot and 0.2 percent voted for the Arab parties. An additional 4.2 percent voted for the Reservists, and 6 percent voted for Amcha Yisrael. Voter turnout increased 26 percent from the 2022 election.
