= Northern Golan Natural Region =

Coordinates: 33°12′03″N 35°46′41″E

- Natural Region
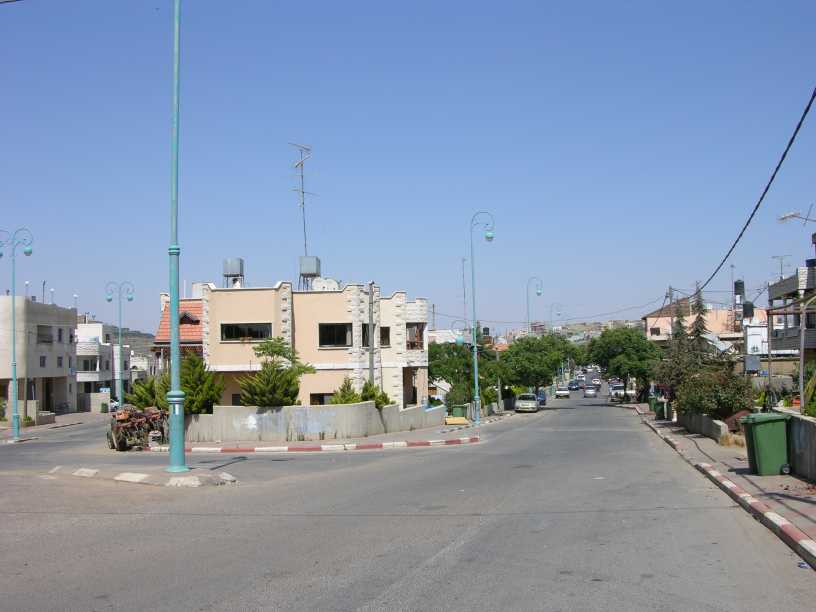
- Street in Buq'ata, the largest community in the Northern Golan Natural Region
- Interactive map of Northern Golan Natural Region
- Country: Israel
- District: Northern
- Subdistrict: Golan
- Largest City: Buq'ata

Area
  - Total: 479 km^{2} (185 sq mi)

Population (2024)
  - Total: 19,056

Ethnicity
  - Jews and others: 25.6%
  - Arabs: 73.0%

The Northern Golan Natural Region is a natural region in the Golan Subdistrict, which is administered by Israel as part of its Northern District. Buq'ata is the largest town in the natural region.

== Geography ==
Districts, Subdistricts and Natural Regions of the State of Israel, 2018

As its name suggests, the natural region comprises most of the northern portion of the Golan Heights, which geologically is a basaltic plateau. It is located north of Katzrin, east and southeast of Kiryat Shmona, and south of Majdal Shams. It has an area of 479 km^{2}, making it the largest natural region in the Northern District. The largest town in the natural region is Buq'ata, one of the four Druze towns in the Golan, which contains 37 percent of the natural region's population. Buq'ata, Mas'ade, and Ghajar are local councils, while the 10 other communities in the natural region are part of the Golan Regional Council.

== Demographics ==
The majority of residents of the Northern Golan Natural Region are Arabs, who constitute 73 percent of the population. Buq'ata and Mas'ade are Druze towns, while Ghajar is an Alawite town. The 10 smaller communities in the natural region are populated by Jews, who constitute 26 percent of the population.

Historical population
Year	Pop.	±%
1983	6,300	—
1995	8,100	+28.6%
2008	13,500	+66.7%
2022	17,999	+33.3%
2024	19,056	+5.9%

== Administrative local authorities ==
Cities	Local Councils	Villages
[None]	Buq'ata; Ghajar; Mas'ade	Golan: Alonei HaBashan; El Rom; Ein Zivan; Kela Alon; Keshet; Merom Golan; Odem; Ortal; Sha'al; Trump Heights

== Voting Patterns ==
In the 2022 election, 58 percent of voters in the natural region voted for the parties of the center-left coalition led by Yair Lapid, while 30 percent voted for the parties of the right-wing coalition led by Benjamin Netanyahu and 4 percent voted for the Arab parties.

In the 2026 election, 66 percent of voters in the natural region voted for the parties of the center-left coalition led by Gadi Eisenkot, while 22 percent voted for the parties of the right-wing coalition led by Benjamin Netanyahu and 4 percent voted for the Arab parties. An additional 2.8 percent voted for the Reservists, and 2.5 percent voted for Amcha Yisrael. Voter turnout increased 84 percent from the 2022 election, one of the largest increases in Israel.
