= Middle Golan Natural Region =

Coordinates: 32°59′30″N 35°41′25″E

- Natural Region
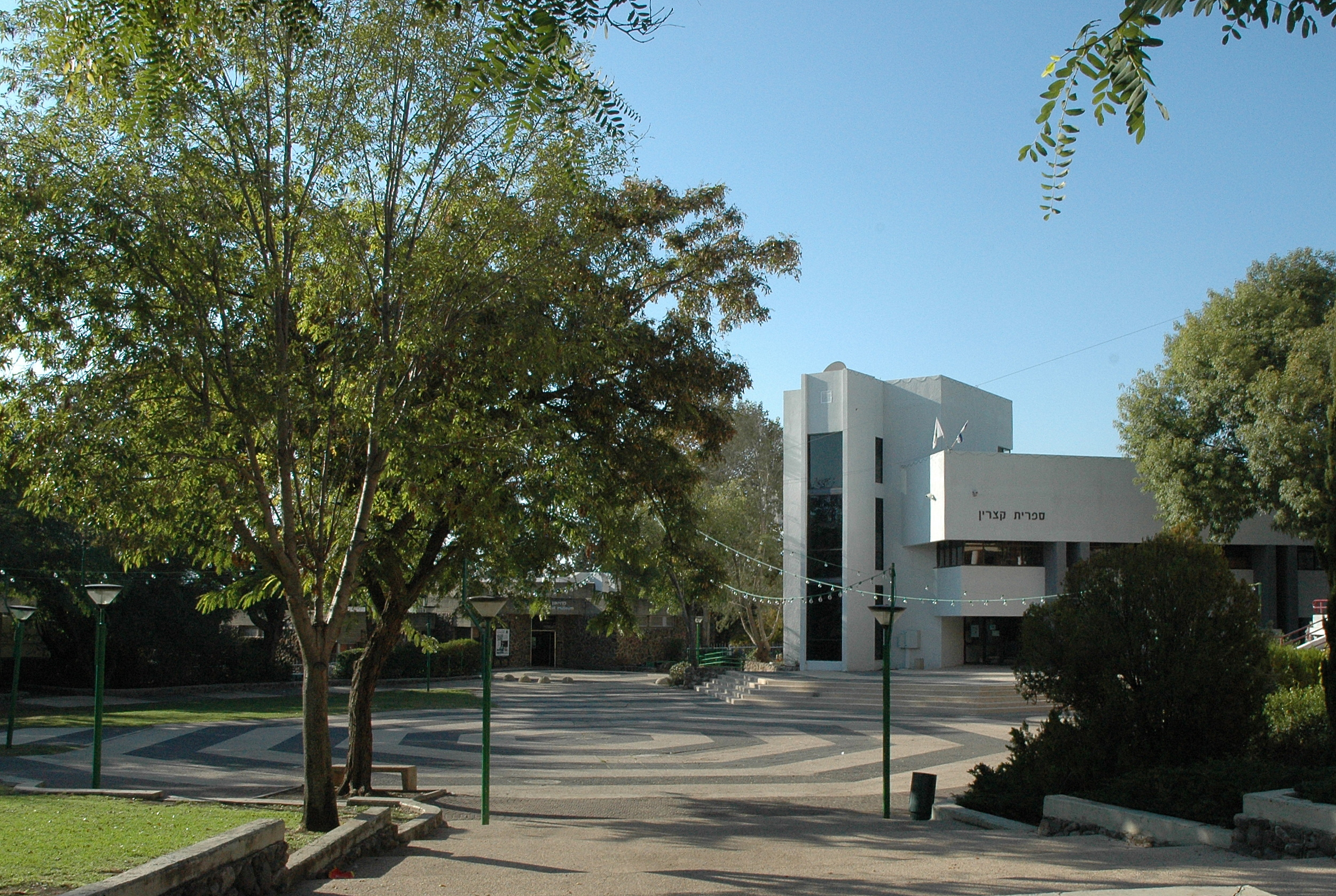
- Street in Katzrin, the largest community in the Middle Golan Natural Region
- Interactive map of Middle Golan Natural Region
- Country: Israel
- District: Northern
- Subdistrict: Golan
- Largest City: Katzrin

Area
  - Total: 294 km^{2} (114 sq mi)

Population (2024)
  - Total: 13,150

Ethnicity
  - Jews and others: 96.9%
  - Arabs: 0.7%

The Middle Golan Natural Region is a natural region in the Golan Subdistrict, which is administered by Israel as part of its Northern District. Katzrin is the largest town in the natural region.

== Geography ==
Districts, Subdistricts and Natural Regions of the State of Israel, 2018

As its name suggests, the natural region consists of the central portion of the Golan Heights, which geologically is a basaltic plateau. It is due east of Safed, and borders the Sea of Galilee to the southwest. It has an area of 294 km^{2}.

== Demographics ==
The vast majority of residents of the Middle Golan Natural Region are Jewish. There are no Arab towns in the natural region. The largest town in the natural region is Katzrin, which contains 61 percent of the natural region's population.

Historical population
Year	Pop.	±%
1983	2,600	—
1995	6,400	+146.2%
2008	9,300	+45.3%
2022	12,439	+33.8%
2024	13,150	+5.7%

== Administrative local authorities ==
Cities	Local Councils	Villages
[None]	Katzrin	Golan: Aniam; Had Ness; Kanaf; Ma'ale Gamla; Kidmat Tzvi; Ramot; Yonatan

== Politics ==
All communities in the natural region are part of the Golan Regional Council, except for Katzrin, which is its own local council.

In the 2022 election, 47.7 percent of voters in the natural region voted for the parties of the right-wing coalition led by Benjamin Netanyahu, while 46.5 percent voted for the parties of the center-left coalition led by Yair Lapid and 0.1 percent voted for the Arab parties.

In the 2026 election, 46 percent of voters in the natural region voted for the parties of the right-wing coalition led by Benjamin Netanyahu, while 45 percent voted for the parties of the center-left coalition led by Gadi Eisenkot and 0.3 percent voted for the Arab parties. An additional 4 percent voted for the Reservists, and 3 percent voted for Amcha Yisrael. Voter turnout increased 24 percent from the 2022 election.
