= Idan Nachmias =

Israeli footballer

Personal information
- Date of birth: 17 March 1997 (age 29)
- Place of birth: Ein Zivan, Israel
- Height: 1.92 m (6 ft 3 1/2 in)
- Position: Centre-back

Team information
- Current team: Hapoel Be'er Sheva
- Number: 15

Youth career
- 2010–2011: Golan Katzrin Community Center
- 2011–2017: Ironi Kiryat Shmona

Senior career*
| Years | Team | Apps | (Gls) |
| 2017–2021 | Ironi Kiryat Shmona | 114 | (5) |
| 2021–2025 | Maccabi Tel Aviv | 76 | (4) |
| 2025–2026 | Ludogorets Razgrad | 25 | (1) |
| 2026– | Hapoel Be'er Sheva | 5 | (0) |

International career^{‡}
| 2013 | Israel U17 | 1 | (0) |
| 2015–2016 | Israel U19 | 15 | (1) |
| 2017–2018 | Israel U21 | 10 | (1) |
| 2020– | Israel | 23 | (0) |
- * Club domestic league appearances and goals as of 07:03, 18 November 2026 (UTC) ‡ National team caps and goals as of 02:53, 18 November 2026 (UTC)

Idan Nachmias (Hebrew: עידן נחמיאס; born 17 March 1997) is an Israeli professional footballer who plays as a centre-back for Israeli Premier League club Hapoel Be'er Sheva and the Israel national team.

== Early life ==
Nachmias was born in kibbutz Ein Zivan, Golan Heights, to an Israeli family of Sephardi Jewish (Greek-Jewish) descent. He grew up in moshav Ani'am, Golan Heights.

He also holds a Portuguese passport, on account of his Sephardi Jewish ancestors, which eases the move to certain European football leagues.

== Club career ==
Nachmias made his professional debut for Ironi Kiryat Shmona in the Israeli Premier League on 6 May 2017, coming on as a substitute in the 58th minute for Ahmed Abed against Hapoel Kfar Saba, which finished as a 1–4 home loss.

On 21 June 2021, Nachmias signed for 4 years in Israeli Premier League club Maccabi Tel Aviv.

On 2nd August 2025, Nachmias signed a 3-year deal as a free transfer with Bulgarian side Ludogorets Razgrad.

On 31 August 2026, Nachmias signed a three-year contract with Israeli Premier League club Hapoel Be'er Sheva.

== International career ==
Nachmias made his senior international debut for Israel on 14 October 2020 in the 2020–21 UEFA Nations League B, coming on as a substitute for Orel Dgani in the second half against Slovakia, this away match finished as a 3–2 win.

== Career statistics ==
=== International ===
As of 14 November 2026

Appearances and goals by national team and year
| National team | Year | Apps | Goals |
|---|---|---|---|
| Israel | 2020 | 1 | 0 |
| Israel | 2024 | 8 | 0 |
| Israel | 2025 | 7 | 0 |
| Israel | 2026 | 6 | 0 |
| Israel | Total | 22 | 0 |

== See also ==
- List of Jewish footballers
- List of Jews in sports
- List of Israelis
