= Bnei Yehuda =

Bnei Yehuda (Hebrew: בני יהודה, lit. Sons of Yehuda) may refer to:

- Bnei Yehuda, Golan Heights, a moshav on the Golan Heights
- Bnei Yehuda Tel Aviv F.C., a football club from Tel Aviv
