= Givat Yoav =

Israeli settlement in the Golan Heights

Givat Yoav: גִּבְעַת יוֹאָב (Hebrew)

Hebrew transcription(s)
  - Standard: Giv'at Yo'av
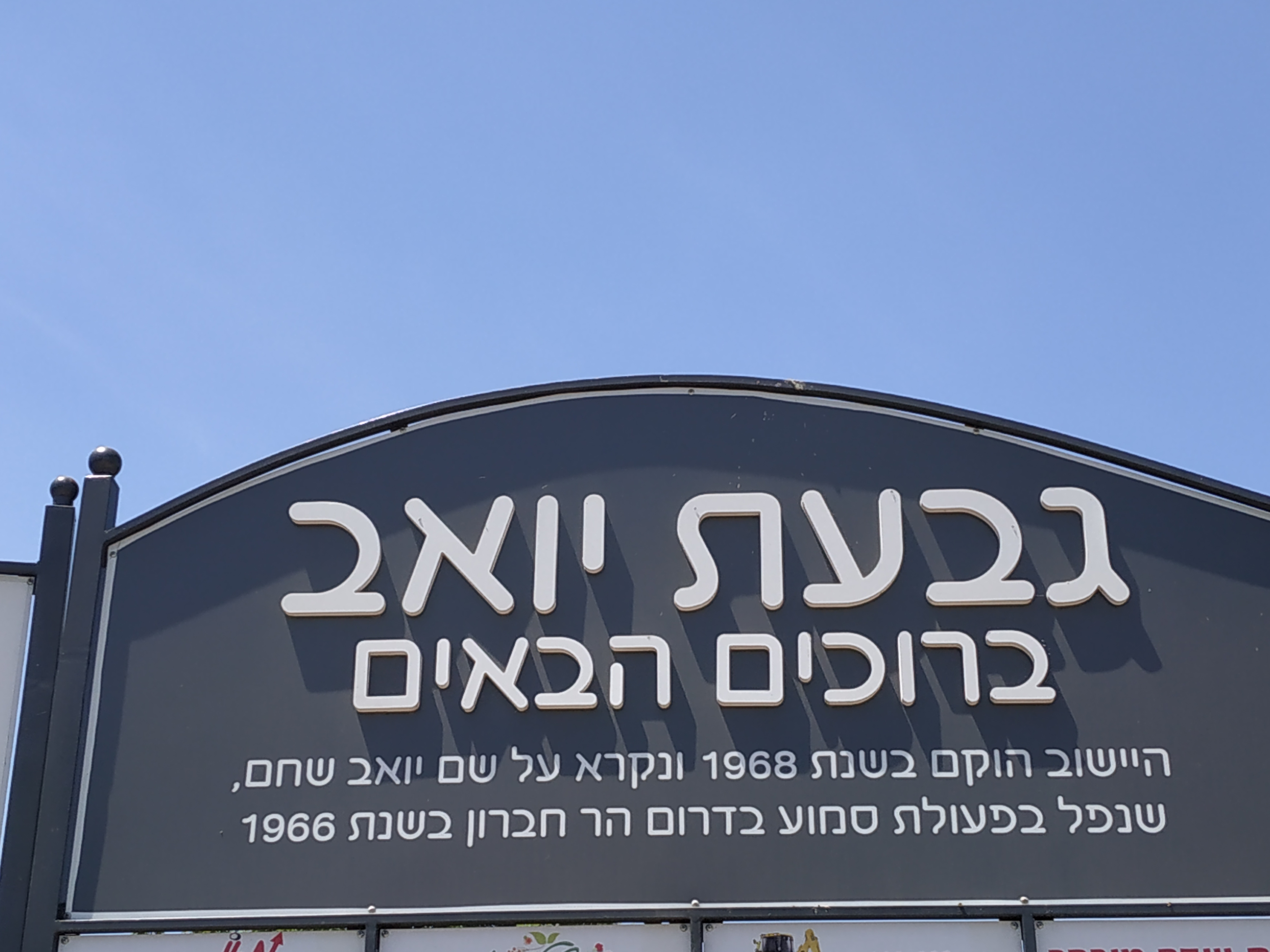
- The entrance sign to Givat Yoav (2019)
- Etymology: Yo'av's Hill
- Location within the Golan Heights Location within the Golan Heights
- Coordinates: 32°47′53″N 35°40′51″E
- Country: Golan Heights (Internationally recognized as Syrian territory occupied by Israel.)
- District: Northern
- Subdistrict: Golan
- Council: Golan
- Affiliation: Moshavim Movement
- Founded: 1968
- Population (2024): 804

Givat Yoav (Hebrew: גִּבְעַת יוֹאָב) is an Israeli settlement organized as a moshav, located in the Golan Heights. The international community considers Israeli settlements in the Golan Heights illegal under international law, but the Israeli government disputes this.

In 2024, it had a population of 804.

== History ==
The settlement was built in the 1960s and was named for Col. Yoav Shaham, who was killed during the Samu Incident in 1966. It falls under the municipal jurisdiction of the Golan Regional Council.

== Transportation ==
The Golan Regional Council operates five buses per day from Givat Yoav to the Israeli city of Tiberias. The bus line begins at Geshur, and also stops at Bnei Yehuda, Ne'ot Golan, Afik, Metzar, Kfar Haruv, and Mevo Hama. The bus ride to Tiberias takes approximately 54 minutes. Egged also operates eight buses per day from Givat Yoav to Beit She'an (and ultimately all the way to Jerusalem). Givat Yoav is also located 5 kilometers from Highway 98, the primary road through the Golan Heights.

== See also ==
- Israeli-occupied territories
