= Neot Golan =

Israeli settlement in the Golan Heights

Neot Golan: נְאוֹת גּוֹלָן (Hebrew)

Hebrew transcription(s)
  - Standard: Ne'ot Golan
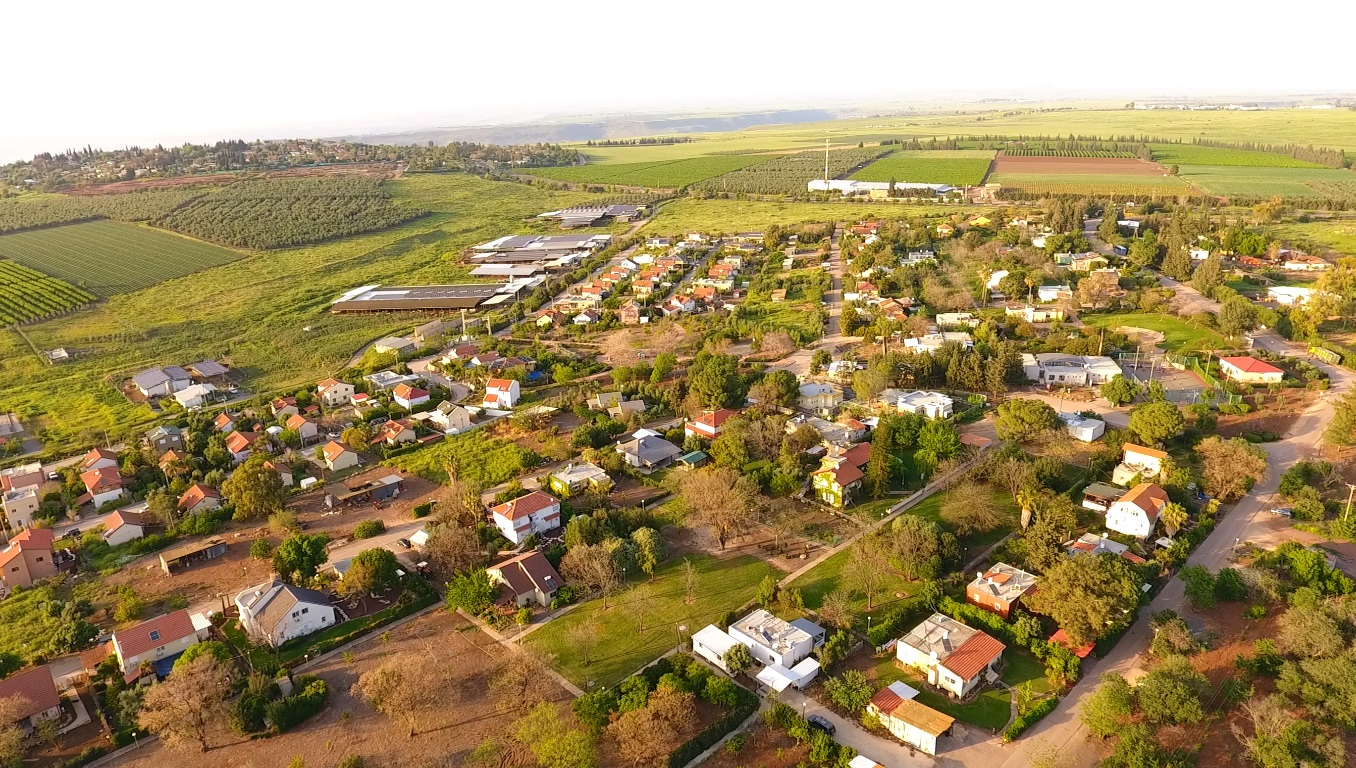
- Neot Golan from above facing west
- Etymology: Abodes of the Golan
- Location within the Golan Heights Location within the Golan Heights
- Coordinates: 32°47′15″N 35°41′37″E
- Country: Golan Heights (Internationally recognized as Syrian territory occupied by Israel.)
- District: Northern
- Subdistrict: Golan
- Council: Golan
- Region: Golan Heights
- Affiliation: HaOved HaTzioni
- Founded: 1968
- Population (2024): 741

Neot Golan (Hebrew: נְאוֹת גּוֹלָן) is an Israeli settlement and moshav, in the southern Golan Heights, under the occupation of Israel. It falls under the jurisdiction of Golan Regional Council, and had a population of 741 in 2024.

The international community considers Israeli settlements in the Golan Heights illegal under international law, but the Israeli government disputes this.

== History ==
The moshav was built in 1968, when Golan area was a part of the Israeli Military Governorate.

== Transportation ==
The Golan Regional Council operates five buses per day from Neot Golan to the Israeli city of Tiberias. The bus line begins at Geshur, and also stops at Giv'at Yoav, Bnei Yehuda, Afik, Metzar, Kfar Haruv, and Mevo Hama. The bus ride to Tiberias takes approximately 47 minutes. Egged also operates eight buses per day from Neot Golan to Beit She'an (and ultimately all the way to Jerusalem). Neot Golan is also located a couple of kilometers from Highway 98, the primary road through the Golan Heights.

== See also ==
- Israeli-occupied territories
