= Kidmat Tzvi =

Israeli settlement in the Golan Heights

Kidmat Tzvi: קִדְמַת צְבִי (Hebrew)
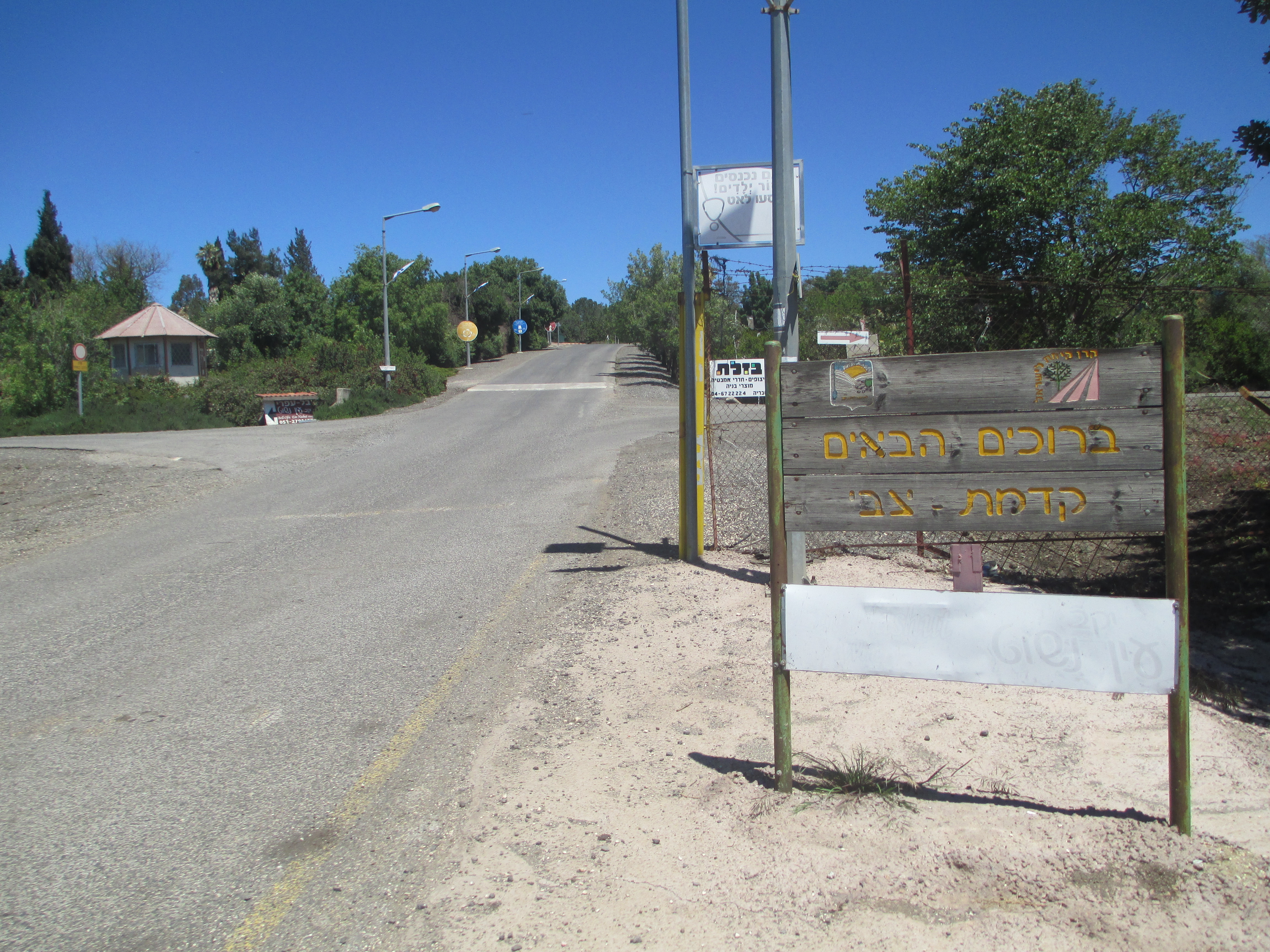

- Location within the Golan Heights Location within the Golan Heights
- Coordinates: 33°1′49″N 35°41′56″E
- Country: Golan Heights (Internationally recognized as Syrian territory occupied by Israel.)
- District: Northern
- Subdistrict: Golan
- Council: Golan
- Region: Golan Heights
- Affiliation: Hitahdut HaIkarim
- Founded: 1981
- Population (2024): 734

Kidmat Tzvi (Hebrew: קִדְמַת צְבִי) is an Israeli settlement organized as a moshav in the central Golan Heights. Located to the north of Katzrin, it falls under the jurisdiction of Golan Regional Council. In 2024 it had a population of 734.

The international community considers Israeli settlements in the Golan Heights illegal under international law, but the Israeli government disputes this.

== Etymology ==
The settlement is named after Tzvi Isaacson, who was president of the Farmers' Association.

== History ==
Control of the area was won by the Israeli Army in the Six-Day War and later occupied. The settlement was built in 1981, in the same year when Israel unilaterally annexed the Golan region and applied civil Israeli rule on the area.

In May 1989, members of the moshav invaded an apple orchard that belonged to a disbanded kibbutz Kela and prevented members of Kibbutz El Rom from entering it. The kibbutz El Rom claimed this orchard too. This invasion finished after some days after an agreement, and Kidmat Tzvi stayed with the orchard.

Near the kibbutz entrance is a memorial, Yad Otniel, dedicated to Israeli Air Force pilot Otniel Shamir, near the site where the plane was shot down by Syrian forces during the Six-Day War. His body was only recovered in 1974, and he was buried in his home, Dorot.

Kidmat Tzvi is a secular community, with no synagogue.

== Economy ==
It is a productive agricultural community where chickens are raised and apples, grapes, pears, and cherries are grown. The town contains five boutique wineries with a combined output of over 130,000 bottles per annum.

== Transportation ==
The Golan Regional Council operates eight buses per day from Kidmat Tzvi to the Israeli city of Kiryat Shmona. The bus line begins at Katzrin, and also stops at Ortal, Ein Zivan, Merom Golan, and Kela Alon. The bus ride to Kiryat Shmona takes approximately 55 minutes. Kidmat Tzvi is located close to Highway 91, a major road running through the Golan Heights.
