= Kfar Haruv =

Israeli settlement in the Golan Heights

Kfar Haruv: כְּפַר חָרוּב (Hebrew)
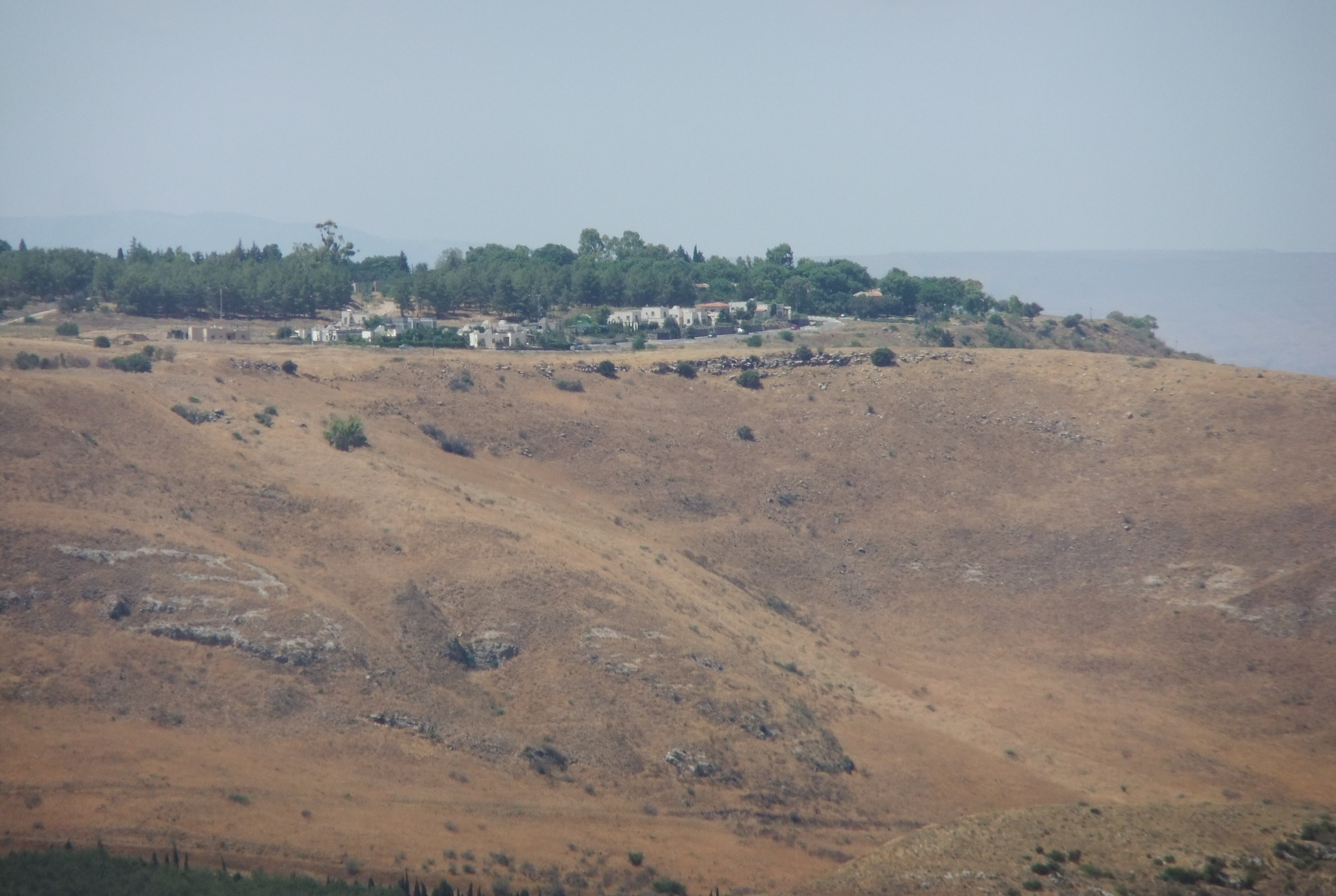

- Location within the Golan Heights Location within the Golan Heights
- Coordinates: 32°45′45″N 35°39′49″E
- Country: Golan Heights (Internationally recognized as Syrian territory occupied by Israel.)
- District: Northern
- Subdistrict: Golan
- Council: Golan Regional Council
- Region: Golan Heights
- Affiliation: Kibbutz Movement
- Founded: 1974
- Founder: Hashomer Hatzair members
- Population (2024): 544

Kfar Haruv (Hebrew: כְּפַר חָרוּב, lit. Carob Village) is an Israeli settlement organized as a kibbutz located in the southern Golan Heights. It was built on the site of the depopulated Syrian village of Kafr Harib (كفر حارب). A member of the Kibbutz Movement, it falls under the jurisdiction of Golan Regional Council. The international community considers Israeli settlements in the Golan Heights illegal under international law, but the Israeli government disputes this. In 2024 it had a population of 544.

== Geography ==
The kibbutz is located on the edge of the cliffs 315 meters (1,033 ft) above sea level (about 525 meters (1,722 ft) above the Sea of Galilee) and 2 kilometers (1.2 mi) east of the sea.

== History ==
=== Antiquity ===
The site is associated with the ancient Jewish village of Kefar Harub (Hebrew: כפר חרוב). Located in the territory of Hippos, it was mentioned in both the Mosaic of Rehob, the Tosefta and the Jerusalem Talmud.

The village is recorded as Kapar Haribos (Καπαρ Ηαριβου) in the Diocletianic boundary stones corpus, dated to c. 300 CE.

=== Ottoman era ===
Kafr Harib, existed at the south edge of the current settlement's built-up area. Kafr Harib appeared in Ottoman tax registers in 1596 as a village in the Nahiya of Jawlan Garbi in the Qada of Hawran. It had a population of 5 Muslim households and 7 bachelors and paid taxes on wheat, barley and goats or beehives. In 1888, Gottlieb Schumacher described it as a village of 70 stone and mud huts with about 200 "affable and hospitable" inhabitants, who ran an excellent bee industry in addition to cultivation.

=== British Mandate ===
Later the village lay just outside the borders of Mandatory Palestine, though some of its lands lay inside Palestine. Kafr Harib village had about 1900 inhabitants when it was depopulated during the Six Day War in 1967.

=== Modern era ===
The Israeli settlement was founded in 1973, and took its name from Kafr Harib. The new Israeli founders settled temporarily in Afik camp, and moved to the present-day location (the site of a Syrian army base that overlooks Ein Gev and HaOn) in 1974. The sixteenth Israeli settlement established in the Golan Heights, its members are native Israelis and immigrants from the United States. In 2011, there were 400 residents, 90 of them living in a neighborhood built in 2004.

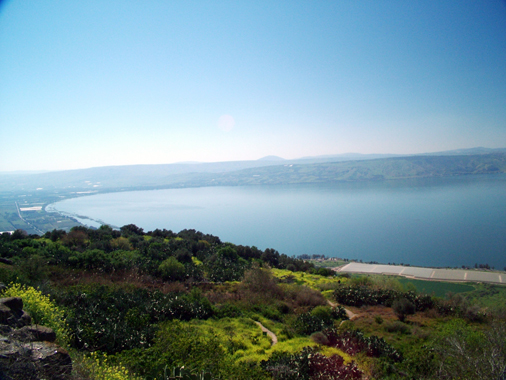
View from Kfar Haruv

== Economy ==
The main economic branch is A.R.I. Kfar Haruv which manufactures hydraulic equipment. Other sources of income are orchards, cows, traditional crops, and tourist lodging. Kfar Haruv also has a laundromat and a drapery workshop. It is a co-operator of Hamat Gader, and operates Mitzpe LeShalom (Peace Vista), a tourist attraction on the edge of the cliffs.

== Transportation ==
The Golan Regional Council operates five buses per day from Kfar Haruv to the Israeli city of Tiberias. The bus line begins at Geshur, and also stops at Giv'at Yoav, Bnei Yehuda, Ne'ot Golan, Afik, Metzar, and Mevo Hama. The bus ride to Tiberias takes approximately 32 minutes. Kfar Haruv is also located close to Highway 98, the primary road through the Golan Heights.

== See also ==
- Israeli-occupied territories
- Status of territories occupied by Israel in 1967
- Israeli Military Governorate
