= Golan Regional Council =

Coordinates: 33°0′N 35°42′E

Golan גולן מועצה אזורית גולן
- Regional council
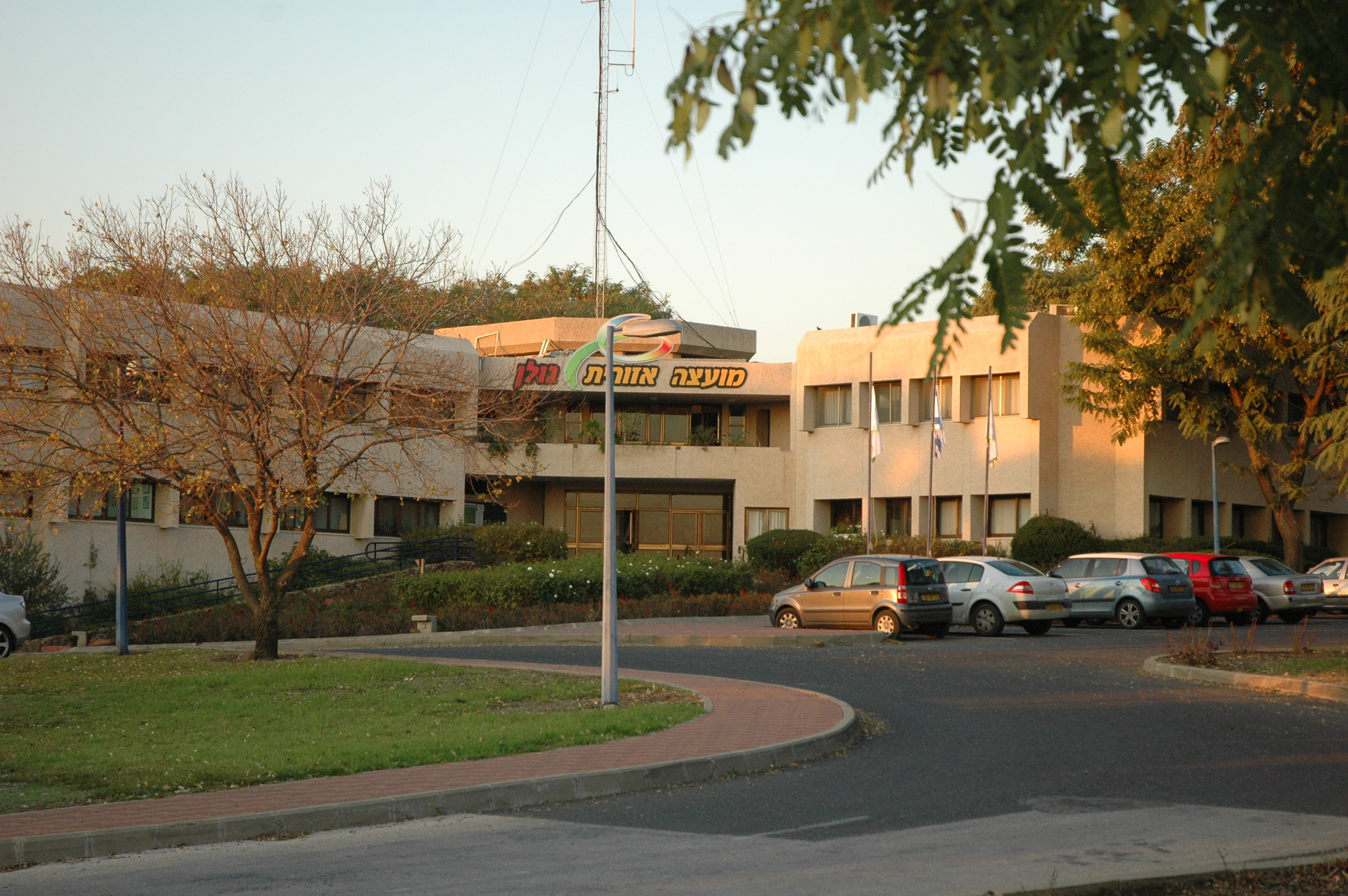
- Interactive map of Golan
- Country: Israel
- District: Northern
- Subdistrict: Golan
- Natural region: Hermon, Middle Golan, Northern Golan, Southern Golan

Government
  - Head of Municipality: Ori Kallner

Area
  - Total: 1,090,220 dunams (1,090.22 km^{2}; 420.94 sq mi)

Population (2026)
  - Total: 20,520
  - Density: 18.82/km^{2} (48.75/sq mi)
- Website: m.e.golan.org.il

Golan Regional Council (Hebrew: מועצה אזורית גולן) is a regional council that supervises regional services to Israeli settlements located on the Golan Heights. It is made up 33 settlements: 18 moshavim, 9 kibbutzim, 6 community settlements and one Moshava. The council headquarters is in the town of Katzrin. The current Head of Council is Ori Kallner.

== Heads of council ==
- Moshe Gorlik (1978–79)
- Eytan Lis (1979–88)
- Yehuda Vulman (1988–2001)
- Eli Malka (2001–2018)
- Haim Rokach (2018–2024)
- Ori Kallner (2024–)

Shimon Sheves was deputy council head in the early years of the council's existence.

== Jurisdiction boundaries ==
The Golan Regional Council's describes its jurisdiction as 'From Mount Hermon in the north to Hamat Gader in the south, and from the ceasefire lines with Syria in the east to the Jordan Valley, the Sea of Galilee and the Jordan River in the west.':

== Settlements ==
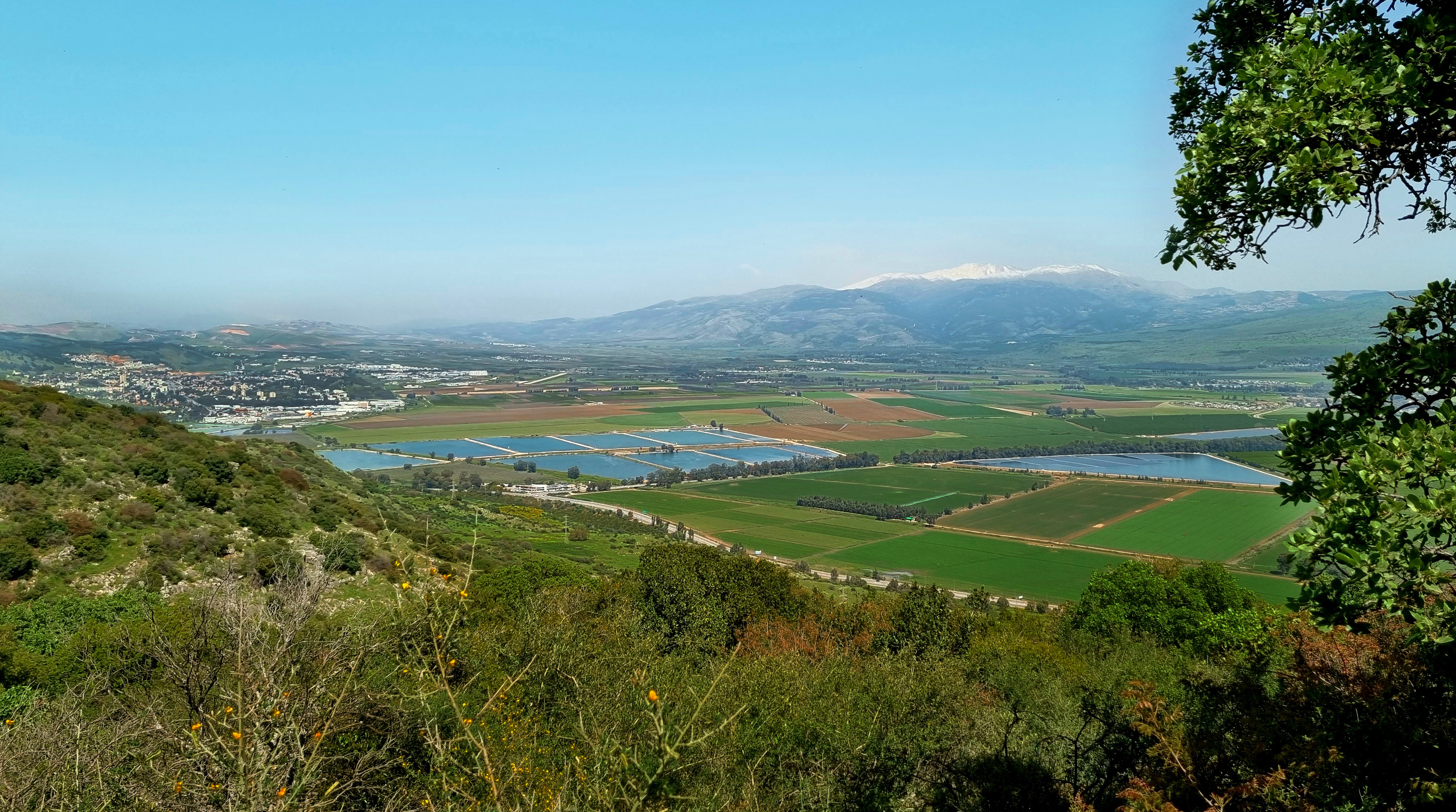
View of the Galilee Panhandle from Naftali Mountains to the Hula Valley, the Golan Heights and the Hermon Range

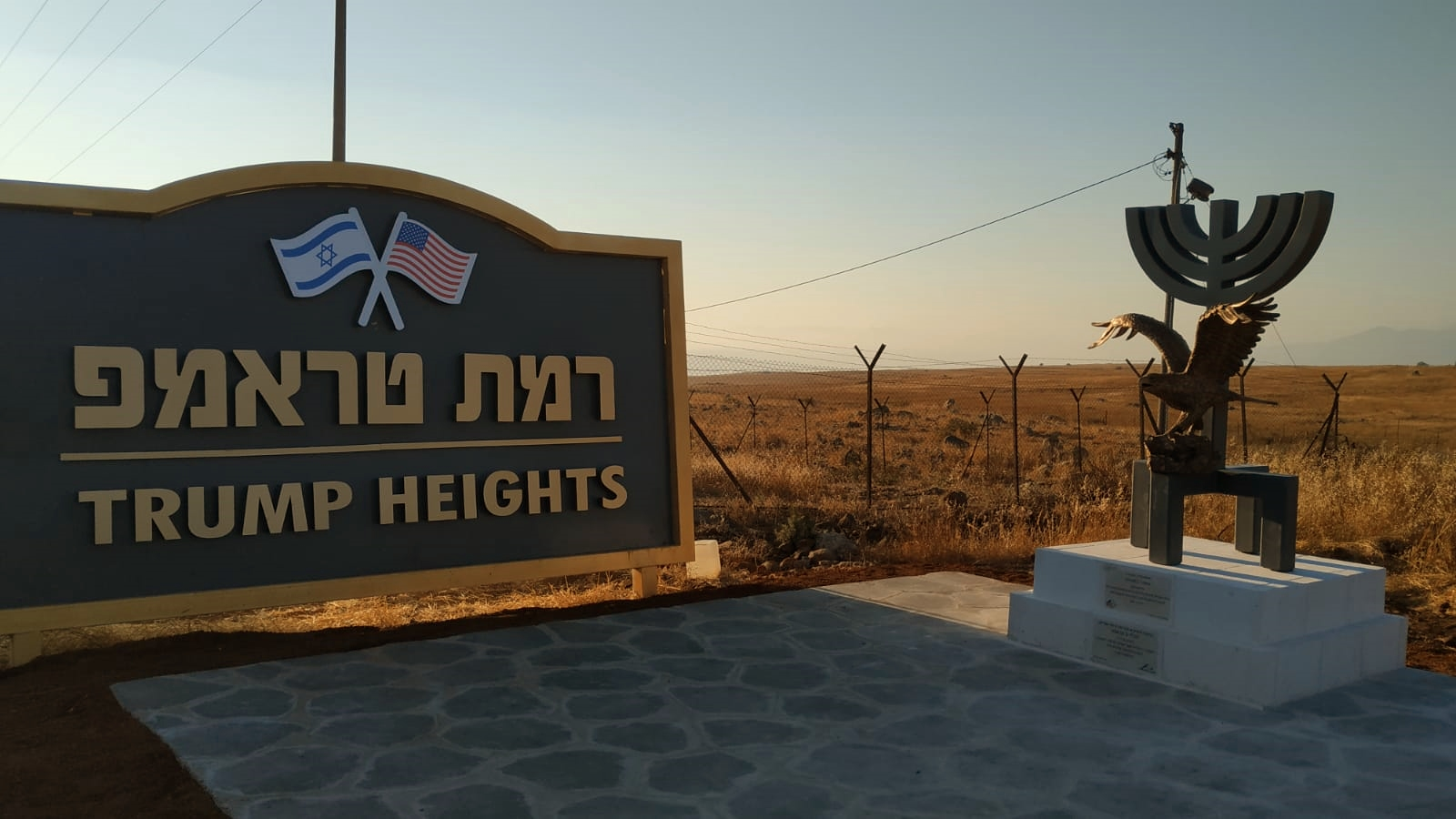
Ramat Trump/Trump Heights sign and Eagle

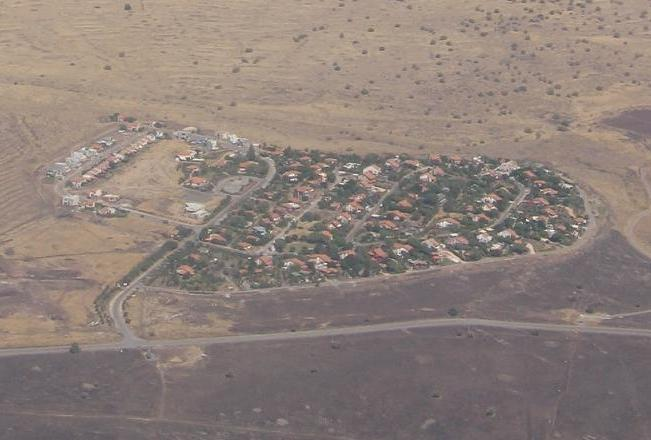
Had Nes from above

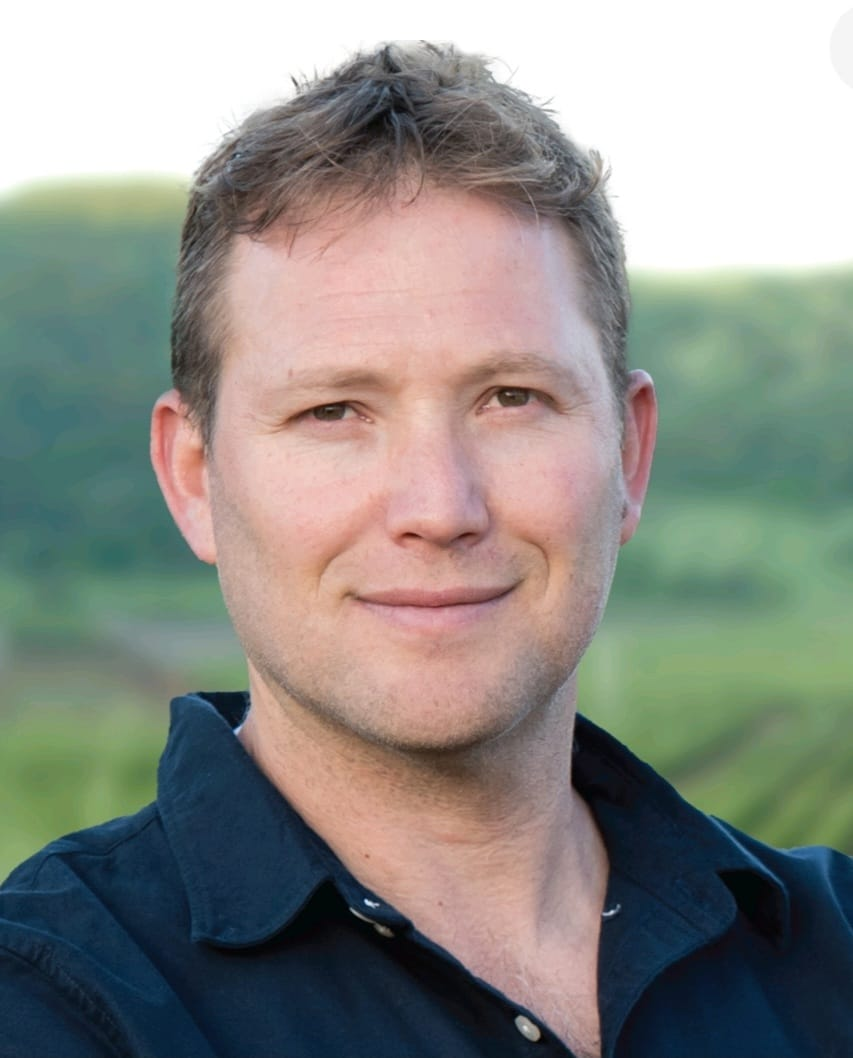
Ori Kallner, Current Head of the Council

Name	Type	Founded	Population (2019)
Afik	Kibbutz	1972	345
Alonei HaBashan	Moshav	1981	457
Aniam	Moshav	1978	533
Avnei Eitan	Moshav	1978	725
Bnei Yehuda	Community settlement	1972	1,085
Ein Zivan	Kibbutz	1968	370
El Rom	Kibbutz	1971	398
Eliad	Moshav	1968	433
Geshur	Kibbutz	1976	280
Givat Yoav	Moshav	1970	707
Had Nes	Community settlement	1989	810
Hispin (Haspin)	Community settlement	1978	2,055
Kanaf	Moshav	1991	461
Kela Alon	Community settlement	1991	319
Keshet	Moshav	1974	799
Kfar Haruv	Kibbutz	1974	434
Kidmat Tzvi	Moshava	1981	499
Ma'ale Gamla	Moshav	1975	557
Merom Golan	Kibbutz	1967	743
Metzar	Kibbutz	1981	299
Mevo Hama	Kibbutz	1968	459
Natur	Kibbutz	1980	713
Neot Golan	Moshav	1968	632
Neve Ativ	Moshav	1968	110
Nimrod	Moshav	1982	16
Nov	Moshav	1974	965
Odem	Moshav	1975	155
Ortal	Kibbutz	1977	343
Ramat Magshimim	Moshav	1968	705
Ramat Trump/Trump Hights	Community settlement	2019	0
Ramot	Moshav	1969	552
Sha'al	Moshav	1980	276
Yonatan	Moshav	1978	745

== Demographics ==
As of February 2026, the Council has a population of 20,520. Approximately 40% of the population is under 18, whereas 10% are senior citizens.

Historical population
Year	Pop.	±%
1983	4,400	—
1995	7,700	+75.0%
2008	11,900	+54.5%
2022	20,326	+70.8%
2024	21,938	+7.9%

== Voting Patterns ==
In the 2022 election, 56 percent of voters in the regional council voted for the parties of the center-left coalition led by Yair Lapid, while 44 percent voted for the parties of the right-wing coalition led by Benjamin Netanyahu and 0.2 percent voted for the Arab parties.

In the 2026 election, 51 percent of voters in the regional council voted for the parties of the center-left coalition led by Gadi Eisenkot, while 38 percent voted for the parties of the right-wing coalition led by Benjamin Netanyahu and 0.2 percent voted for the Arab parties. An additional 4.8 percent voted for the Reservists, and another 4.8 percent voted for Amcha Yisrael. Voter turnout increased 26 percent from the 2022 election.

== Settlement product ban ==
In August 2026, the Dutch government banned products from Israeli settlements in the Golan Heights.
