= Mevo Hama =

Israeli settlement in the Golan Heights

Mevo Hama: מְבוֹא חַמָּה (Hebrew)
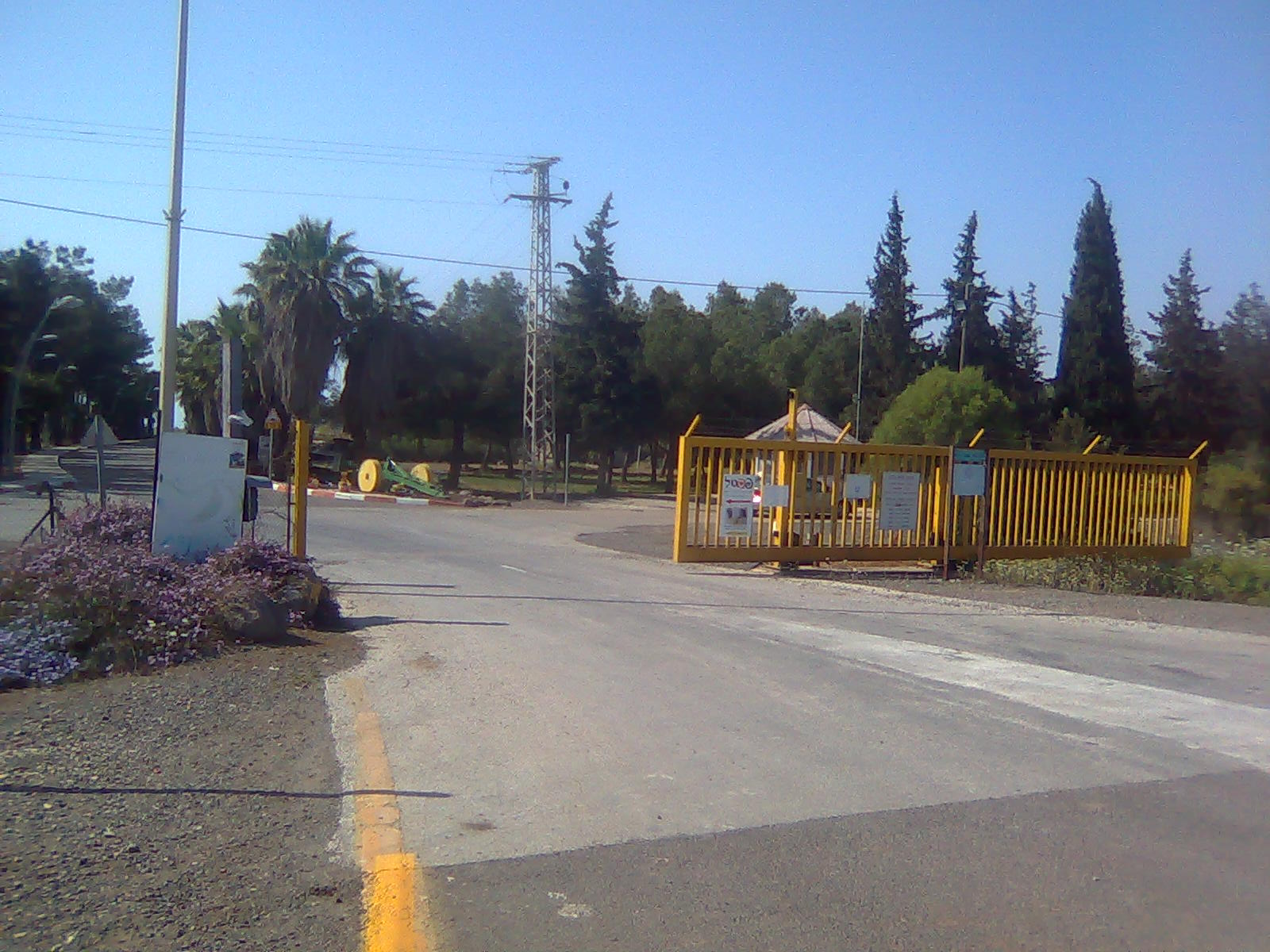
- Entrance gate to the kibbutz

- Location within the Golan Heights Location within the Golan Heights
- Coordinates: 32°44′13″N 35°39′18″E
- Country: Golan Heights (Internationally recognized as Syrian territory occupied by Israel.)
- District: Northern
- Subdistrict: Golan
- Council: Golan
- Region: Golan Heights
- Affiliation: Kibbutz Movement
- Founded: 1968
- Population (2024): 568

Mevo Hama (Hebrew: מְבוֹא חַמָּה) is an Israeli settlement organized as a kibbutz in the Golan Heights. The settlement was established as a kibbutz after Israel occupied the area in the Six Day War in 1967. The southernmost Israeli settlement in the Golan, it is located 2 kilometers (1.2 mi) from the Sea of Galilee at a height of 350 meters (1,150 ft) above sea level and falls under the jurisdiction of Golan Regional Council. In 2024 it had a population of 568.

The international community considers Israeli settlements in the Golan Heights illegal under international law, but the Israeli government disputes this.

== History ==
The second Israeli settlement established in the Golan after the 1967 Six-Day War, it was built on a Syrian military base called "Emrit Ez Edeen", from which the Syrians had fired at the kibbutzim on the border (Ein Gev and HaOn). In January 1968, several members of the surrounding kibbutzim gathered and decided to establish a new settlement in the area and in September had settled the ruins of the base. They were joined in 1971 by several youth groups from Israel, Australia and England. The name of the settlement, meaning The Gateway of, or Approach to, the Hot Springs, referring to nearby Hamat Gader, was given to it by author Mattityahu Shalem.

== Transportation ==
The Golan Regional Council operates five buses per day from Mevo Hama to the Israeli city of Tiberias. The bus line begins at Geshur, and also stops at Giv'at Yoav, Bnei Yehuda, Ne'ot Golan, Afik, Metzar, and Kfar Haruv. The bus ride to Tiberias takes approximately 27 minutes. Mevo Hama is also located directly on Highway 98, the primary road through the Golan Heights.

== See also ==
- Israeli-occupied territories
