= Geshur (Israeli settlement) =

Israeli settlement in the Golan Heights

Geshur: גְּשׁוּר (Hebrew)
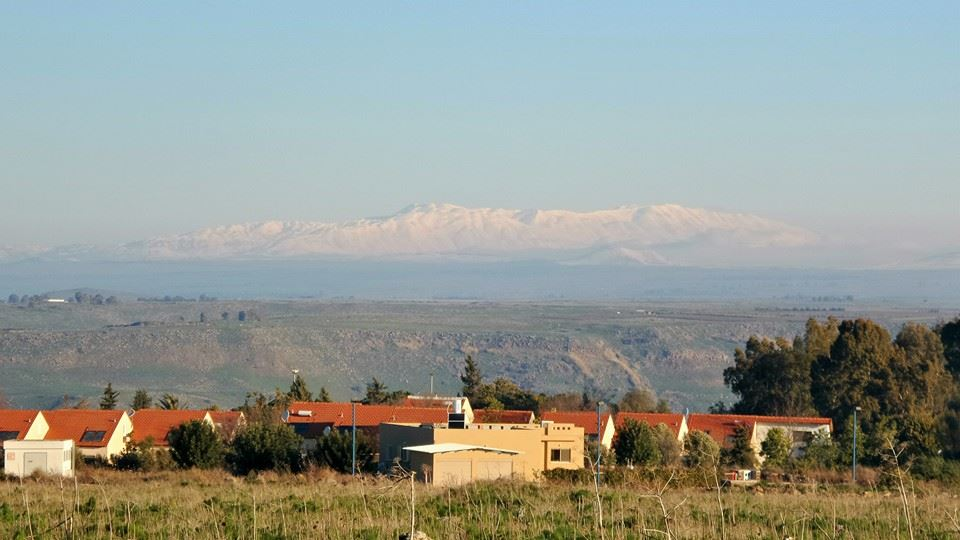

- Location within the Golan Heights Location within the Golan Heights
- Coordinates: 32°49′10″N 35°42′56″E
- Country: Golan Heights (Internationally recognized as Syrian territory occupied by Israel.)
- District: Northern
- Subdistrict: Golan
- Council: Golan
- Region: Golan Heights
- Affiliation: Kibbutz Movement
- Founded: 1971
- Founder: Hashomer Hatzair members
- Population (2024): 357

Geshur (Hebrew: גְּשׁוּר, lit. Bridging) is an Israeli settlement organized as a kibbutz on the ridge of the southern Golan Heights. The international community considers Israeli settlements in the Golan Heights illegal under international law, but the Israeli government disputes this. In 2024 it had a population of 357.

== Etymology ==
The kibbutz is named after a biblical kingdom which may or may not have been in the same area.

== History ==
=== Bronze age ===
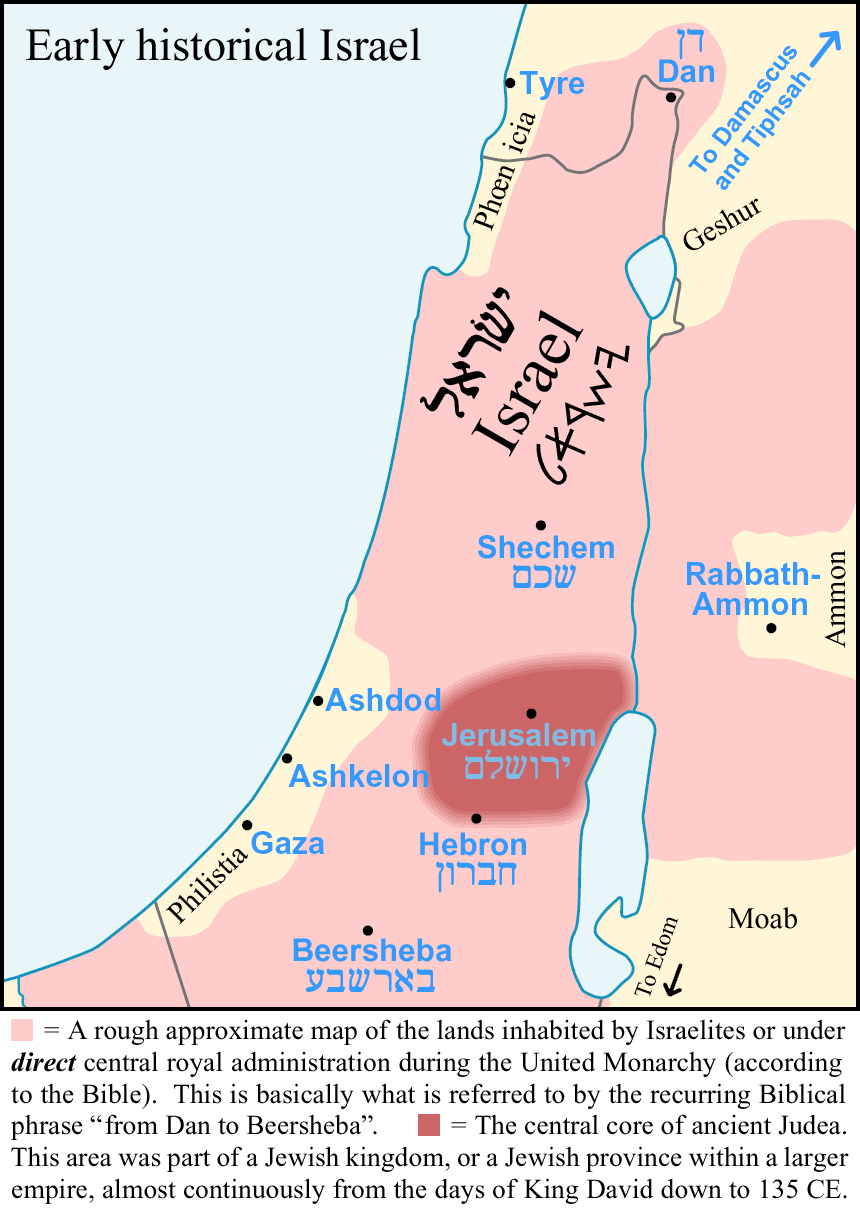
Location of biblical Geshur

According to the Bible, during the time of King David, Geshur was an independent kingdom (Joshua 13:13). David married Maachah, a daughter of Talmai, King of Geshur. (2 Samuel 3:3, 1 Chronicles 3:2) Her son Absalom fled to his mother's native country, after the murder of his half-brother and David's eldest son, Amnon. Absalom stayed there for three years before being rehabilitated by David. (ib. 13:37, 15:8) Geshur managed to maintain its independence from the Aramean kingdoms until after the time of King Solomon.

=== Modern period ===
Kibbutz Geshur was founded in 1971 by Hashomer Hatzair, a socialist-Zionist youth movement, The village was established to the south of the Syrian village of Al-Adaisa, which was depopulated and razed, after being occupied by Israel in 1967. The first Golan Heights vineyards were planted in Geshur in 1976.

== Transportation ==
The Golan Regional Council operates five buses per day from Geshur to the Israeli city of Tiberias. The bus line also stops at Giv'at Yoav, Bnei Yehuda, Ne'ot Golan, Afik, Metzar, Kfar Haruv, and Mevo Hama. The bus ride to Tiberias takes approximately 1 hour and 4 minutes. Geshur is also located 5 kilometers from Highway 98, the primary road through the Golan Heights.
