= Pelter Winery =

Israeli winery

- Location: Ein Zivan
- Coordinates: 33.0964°N 35.7962°E
- Wine region: Galilee
- Founded: 2005
- Key people: Tal Pelter
- Website: www.pelterwinery.com

Pelter Winery (Hebrew: יקב פלטר) is an Israeli winery established in 2005 by Tal Pelter. Headquartered in Tzofit, the winery itself is located in Ein Zivan, an Israeli settlement and Kibbutz in the Golan Heights.

== History ==
After initially producing 4000 bottles from grapes grown in the family farm in Tzofit in 2002, the Pelters selected the location due to the favorable terroir: a cold dry climate, large temperature swings between day and night temperature, basalt soil, high altitude, and high levels of sun radiation. The Golan-based winery was established in 2005, and its 2010 vintage produced 85,000 bottles.

Pelter sources half its grapes from the northern Golan, and the rest from vineyards in the Jerusalem hills and the mountains of the Upper Galilee. It produces wines of several varietals, including Shiraz, Cabernet Sauvignon, Cabernet Franc and Sauvignon blanc, as well as Methode traditionelle sparkling wines, using Chardonnay grapes. It is one of only four wineries in the country that makes sparkling wine.

== Awards ==
The winery was named one of Israel's top 3 wineries by wine and food critic Daniel Rogov

== See also ==
- Israeli wine
