= Afik =

Israeli settlement in the Golan Heights

Afik: אֲפִיק (Hebrew)

Hebrew transcription(s)
  - Official: Afiq
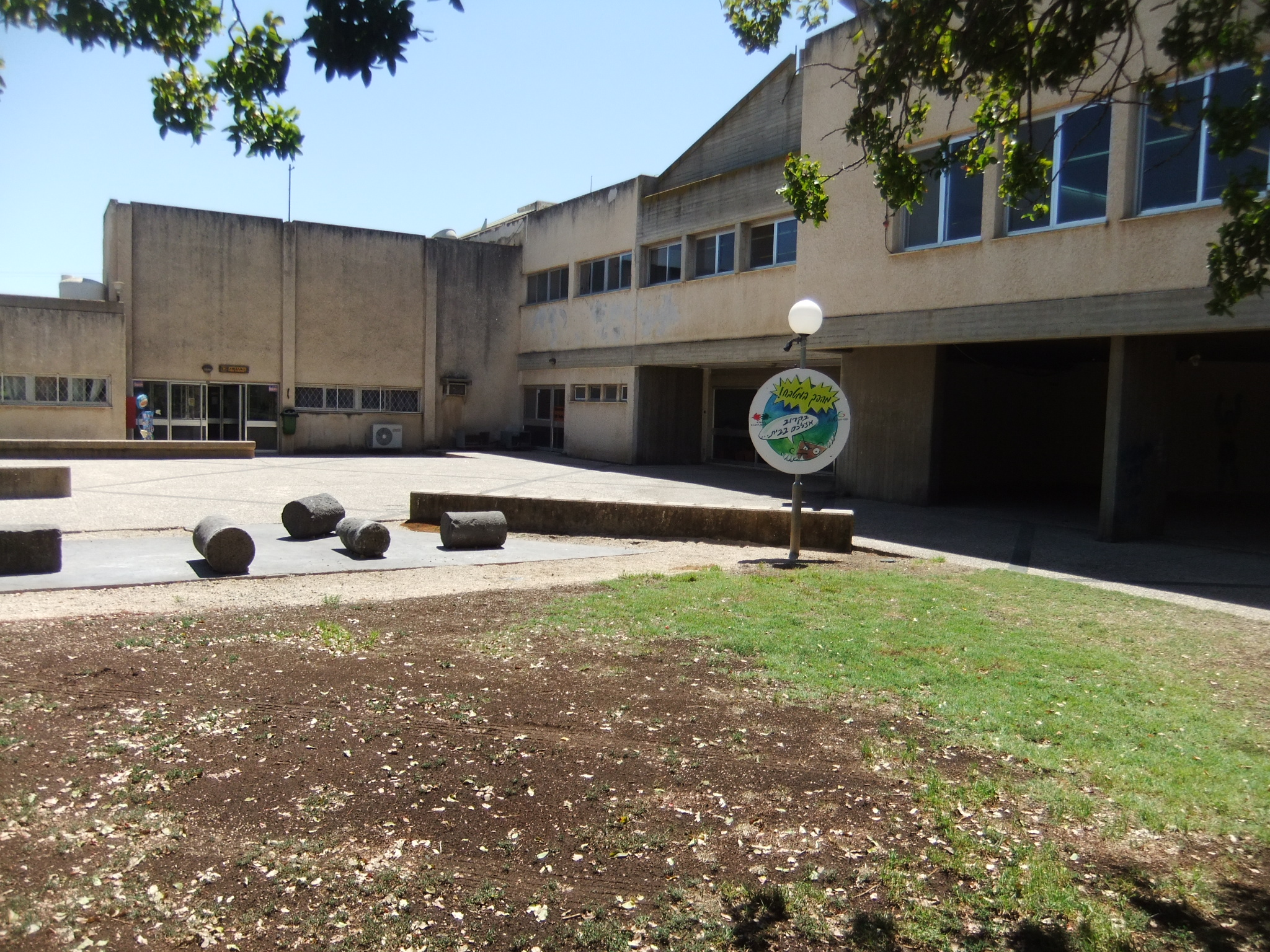

- Location within the Golan Heights Location within the Golan Heights
- Coordinates: 32°46′47″N 35°42′05″E
- Country: Golan Heights (Internationally recognized as Syrian territory occupied by Israel.)
- District: Northern
- Subdistrict: Golan
- Council: Golan Regional Council
- Region: Golan Heights
- Affiliation: Kibbutz Movement
- Founded: 1972
- Population (2024): 402

Afik (Hebrew: אֲפִיק) is an Israeli settlement organized as a kibbutz in the Golan Heights. It was established in 1972 close to the abandoned Syrian village of Fiq following Israel's capture and occupation of the Golan Heights in the 1973 Yom Kippur War. In 2024, it had a population of 402..

The international community considers Israeli settlements in the Golan Heights illegal under international law, while the Israeli government disputes this.

== Etymology ==
Afiq literally means channel, riverbed. The name is derived from the Arab name Fiq and the ancient Biblical city Afeq.

== Name and biblical Aphek ==
There are multiple locations called Aphek in the Bible, and the location of the kibbutz was believed to be adjacent to the ruins of the ancient Aphek mentioned in the Books of Kings (1 Kings 20:26), which tells how King Ahab of Israel defeated Ben-Hadad I of Damascus and the prophet Elisha foretold that King Jehoash of Israel would defeat Ben-Hadad III of Damascus three times. Archaeologists however lately favour Tel 'En Gev/Khirbet el-'Asheq within Kibbutz Ein Gev as the site of biblical Aphek.

== History ==
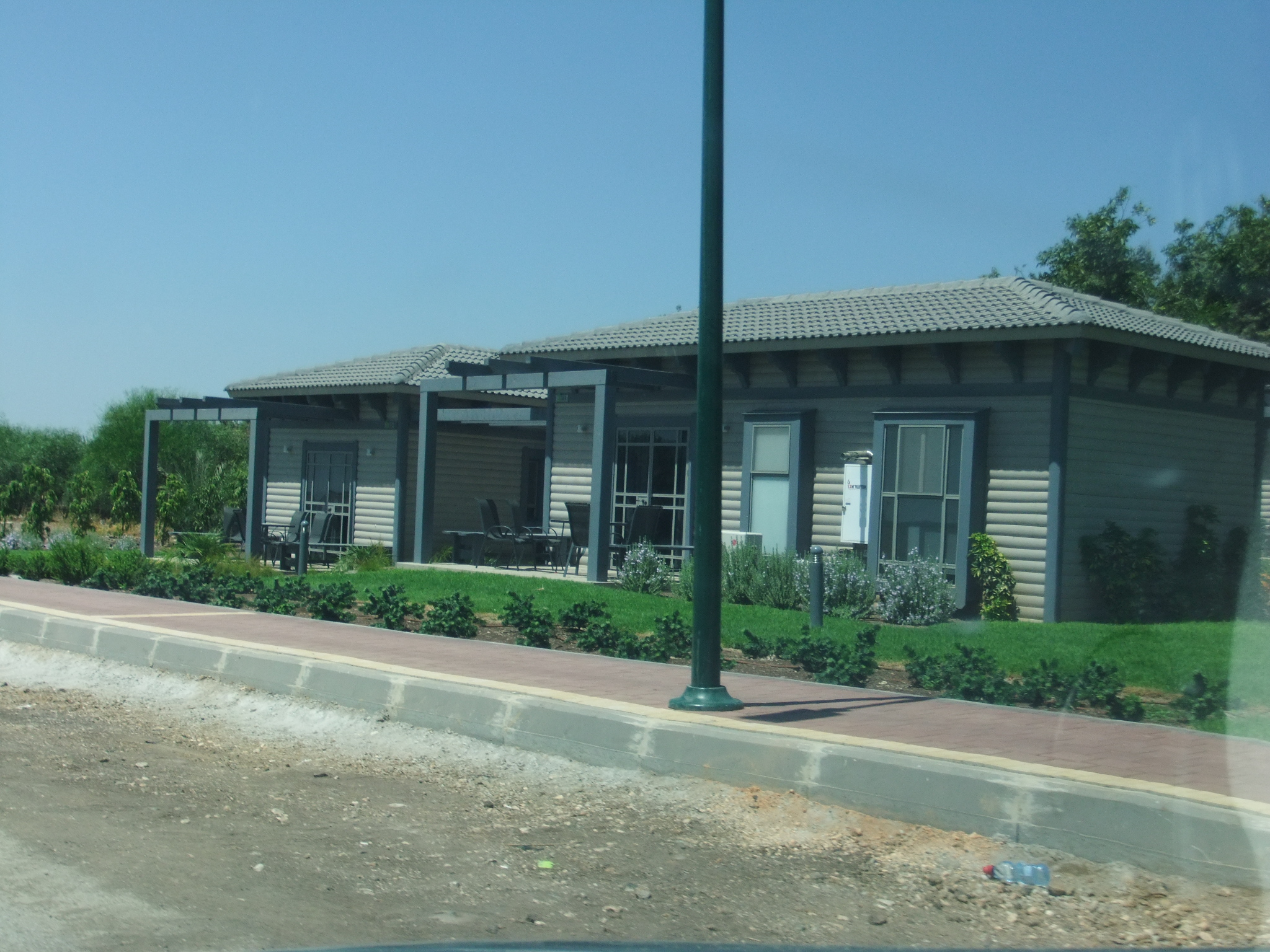
Afik vacation apartments

Kibbutz Afik, affiliated with Ihud HaKvutzot VeHaKibbutzim, was established near the site of the abandoned Syrian village of Fiq on 8 May 1972. It falls under the municipal jurisdiction of the Golan Regional Council, and the Fik Airfield is located nearby.

== Economy ==
Economic branches include agriculture (seasonal vegetables, pulses, and fruit orchards), dairy cattle and chicken coops. The kibbutz also operates several factories in partnership with Yifat such as Afic Printing Solutions, which produces toners and ink cartridges. Afik shares ownership of Hamat Gader, a hot mineral springs health resort, with three other kibbutzim. Another source of employment is the Orhan Afik guesthouse.

== Transportation ==
The Golan Regional Council operates five buses per day from Afik to the Israeli city of Tiberias. The bus line begins at Geshur, and also stops at Giv'at Yoav, Bnei Yehuda, Ne'ot Golan, Metzar, Kfar Haruv, and Mevo Hama. The bus ride to Tiberias takes approximately 45 minutes. Egged also operates eight buses per day from Afik to Beit She'an (and ultimately all the way to Jerusalem). Afik is also located close to Highway 98, the primary road through the Golan Heights.

== Notable people ==
- Shimon Sheves (born 1952), Israeli political strategic advisor

== See also ==
- Israeli-occupied territories
