= Bnei Yehuda (Israeli settlement) =

Israeli settlement in the Golan Heights

Bnei Yehuda: בְּנֵי יְהוּדָה (Hebrew)
- Location within the Golan Heights Location within the Golan Heights
- Coordinates: 32°47′55″N 35°41′23″E
- Country: Golan Heights (Internationally recognized as Syrian territory occupied by Israel.)
- District: Northern
- Subdistrict: Golan
- Council: Golan
- Founded: 1972
- Population (2024): 1,244

Bnei Yehuda (Hebrew: בְּנֵי יְהוּדָה, lit. 'Sons of Judah') is an Israeli settlement organized as a moshav located in the southern Golan Heights. The moshav was built in 1972 and falls under the municipal jurisdiction of the Golan Regional Council. The international community considers Israeli settlements in the Golan Heights illegal under international law, but the Israeli and the U.S government disputes this. In 2024 its population was 1,244.

== History ==
=== Late Ottoman and Mandate periods ===
In the winter of 1885, members of the Old Yishuv in Safed formed the Beit Yehuda Society and purchased 15,000 dunams of land from the village of Ramthaniye in the central Golan. Due to financial hardships and difficulty in securing a kushan (Ottoman land deed), the site was abandoned a year later. Soon afterwards, the society regrouped and purchased 2,000 dunams of land from the village of Bir esh-Shagum on the western slopes of the Golan.

In 1890, six houses were built with the help of the Hovevei Zion organisation from London. In 1906, the population was 33, and the land area was 3,500 dunams (3.5 km^{2}). A Hashomer scheme to settle more farmers there in 1913 was not successful. The Jews fled in the wake of the 1920 Nebi Musa riots. The last to depart was the Bernstein family, who left on 25 April 1920 after Arabs attacked the village and killed two family members.

=== Modern village ===
Modern Bnei Yehuda was founded in 1972 east of the former site by workers of the Negev Nuclear Research Center and Israel Aircraft Industries, following an appeal by the Jewish Agency. The village is located on top of the depopulated and demolished Syrian village of Sqoufiya.

== Transportation ==
The Golan Regional Council operates five buses per day from Bnei Yehuda to the Israeli city of Tiberias. The bus line begins at Geshur, and also stops at Giv'at Yoav, Afik, Ne'ot Golan, Metzar, Kfar Haruv, and Mevo Hama. The bus ride to Tiberias takes approximately 50 minutes. Egged also operates eight buses per day from Bnei Yehuda to Beit She'an (and ultimately all the way to Jerusalem). Bnei Yehuda is also located 4 kilometers from Highway 98, the primary road through the Golan Heights.
