= Highway 98 (Golan Heights) =

Highway in Israel

Coordinates: 33°01′39″N 35°50′14″E

Highway 98
- כביש 98
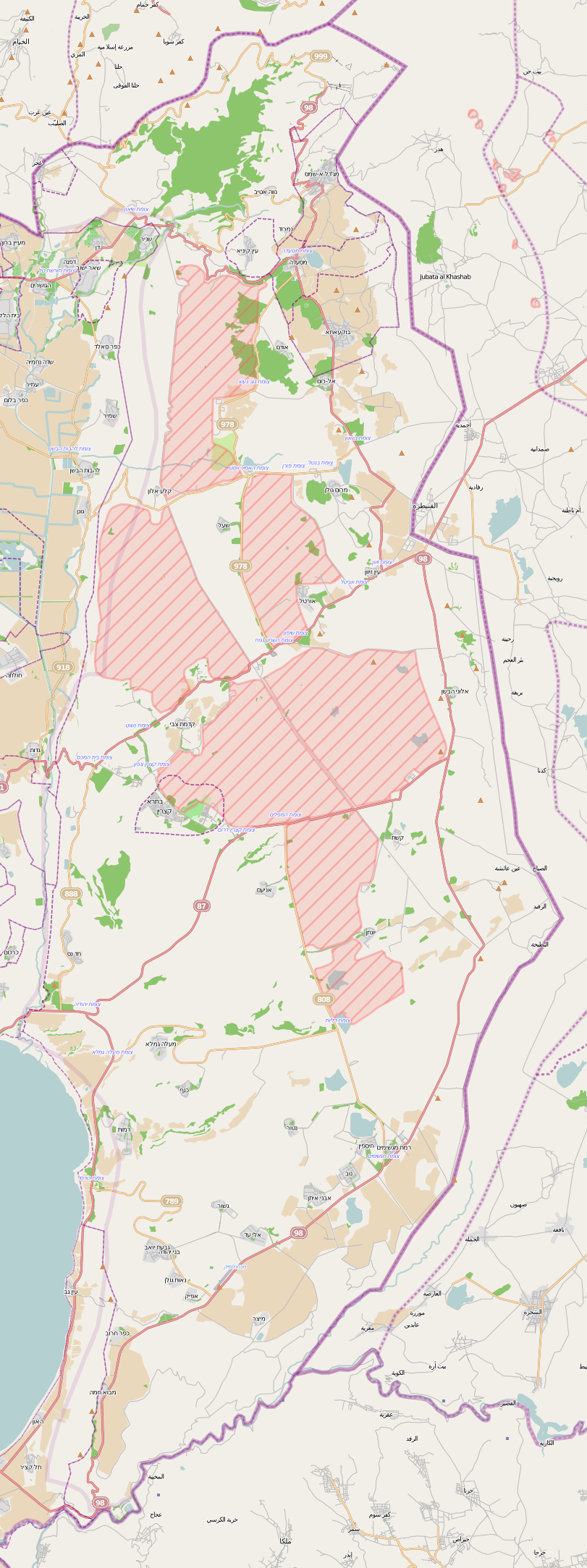

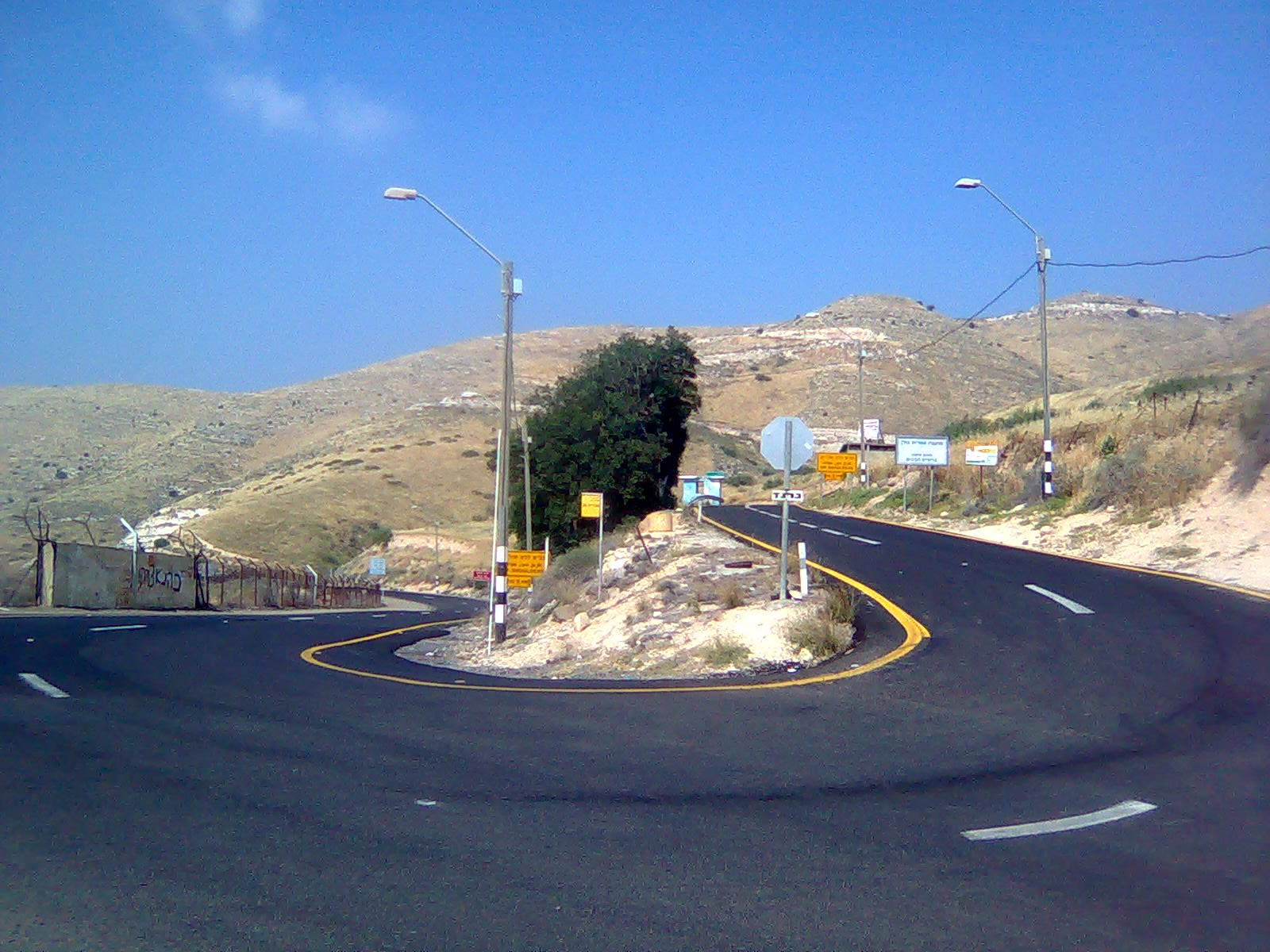
- Highway 98 in Hamat Gader

Route information
- Length: 99 km (62 mi)

Major junctions
- South end: Ma'agan Junction
- North end: The Lower Cable Car

Location
- Country: Israel

Highway system
- Roads in Israel; Highways
| ← Highway 92 | → Highway 99 |

Highway 98 is the primary north-south highway on the Israeli side of the Golan Heights. It is shaped like an archer's bow, and it runs parallel to the ceasefire line with Syria. The route runs from Tzemah junction south of the Kinneret, first through the Yarmuk valley, then it rises up a steep slope into the Golan Heights and crosses it until it reaches the lowest cable-car station on Mount Hermon. There it meets Route 999. Highway 98 is steep compared to the other highways in Israel, rising from 210 meters below sea level at the Kinneret to 1600 meters above sea level on the Hermon.

Route 98 is maintained by the National Roads Company of Israel.

== Junctions and interchanges (south to north) ==
| District | Location | km | mi | Name | Destinations | Notes |
|---|---|---|---|---|---|---|
| Northern | Ma'agan | 0 | 0.0 | צומת מעגן (Ma'agan Junction) | Highway 92 | |
| Northern | Sha'ar HaGolan | 1.5 | 0.93 | צומת שער הגולן (Sha'ar HaGolan Junction) | Entrance to Sha'ar HaGolan | |
| Northern | Hamat Gader | 6.5 | 4.0 | צומת חמת גדר (Hamat Gader Junction) | Road 7599 | |
| Northern | Mevo Hama | 15 | 9.3 | צומת מבוא חמה (Mevo Hama Junction) | Entrance to Mevo Hama | |
| Northern | Kfar Haruv | 18 | 11 | צומת חרוב (Haruv Junction) | Road 7890 | |
| Northern | Metzar | 22 | 14 | צומת מיצר (Metzar Junction) | Road 7893 | |
| Northern | Afik | 23 | 14 | צומת אפיק (Afik Junction) | Route 789 | |
| Northern | Geshur | 25 | 16 | צומת גשור (Geshur Junction) | Road 8690 | |
| Northern | Eli-ad | 27 | 17 | צומת אלי-עד (Eli-ad Junction) | Road 8692 | |
| Northern | Avnei Eitan | 29 | 18 | צומת אבני איתן (Avnei Eitan Junction) | Road 8694 | |
| Northern | Nov | 32 | 20 | צומת נוב (Nov Junction) | Road 8696 | |
| Northern | Haspin | 33 | 21 | צומת חספין (Haspin Junction) | Road 8698 | |
| Northern | Ramat Magshimim | 34 | 21 | צומת מגשימים (Magshimim Junction) | Route 808 | |
| Northern | Tal Saki | 38 | 24 | צומת תל סאקי (Tal Saki Junction) | Entrance to Tal Saki | |
| Northern | Yonatan | 45 | 28 | צומת אורחה (Orha Junction) | Petroleum Road | |
| Northern | Givat Pazra | 55 | 34 | צומת פזרה (Pazra Junction) | Highway 87 | |
| Northern | Alonei HaBashan | 58 | 36 | צומת בשן (Bashan Junction) | Road 9091 | |
| Northern | Ein Zivan | 67 | 42 | צומת זיוון (Zivan Junction) | Highway 91; Access to Quneitra Crossing | |
| Northern | Mount Avital | 70 | 43 | צומת אביטל (Avital Junction) | Entrance to Mount Avital and Mount Bental | |
| Northern | Merom Golan | 75 | 47 | צומת בראון (Bar'on Junction) | Route 959 | |
| Northern | El Rom | 78 | 48 | צומת אל רום (El Rom Junction) | Road 9799 | |
| Northern | Buq'ata | 81 | 50 | צומת בוקעתא (Buq'ata Junction) | Entrance to Buq'ata | |
| Northern | Mas'ade | 84.5 | 52.5 | צומת יער אודם (Odem Forest Junction) | Route 978 | |
| Northern | Mas'ade | 85 | 53 | צומת מסעדה (Mas'ade Junction) | Highway 99 | |
| Northern | Mount Ram | 88 | 55 | צומת יער אודם (Odem Forest Junction) | Road 9898; Access to Nimrod | |
| Northern | Majdal Shams | 90 | 56 | צומת מג'דל שמס (Majdal Shams Junction) | Route 989 | |
| Northern | Mount Hermon | 99 | 62 | הרכבל התחתון (The Lower Cable Car) | Route 999 | |
1.000 mi = 1.609 km; 1.000 km = 0.621 mi

== Places of interest near Highway 98 ==
- The Kinneret
- Hamat Gader
- Metzukei HaOn Nature Reserve
- Meitzar Stream
- El Al Nature Reserve
- Iris Grand-dufii reserve
- Hushniyya iris reserve
- Bashanit Range reserve
- A view into Kuneitra across the ceasefire line
- Mount Avital reserve
- Hermonit reserve
- Valley of Tears
- Odem Forest
- Berekhat Ram
- Sa'ar Stream
- Mount Hermon

== See also ==
- List of highways in Israel
