= El Rom =

Israeli settlement in the Golan Heights

El Rom: אֶל רוֹם (Hebrew)
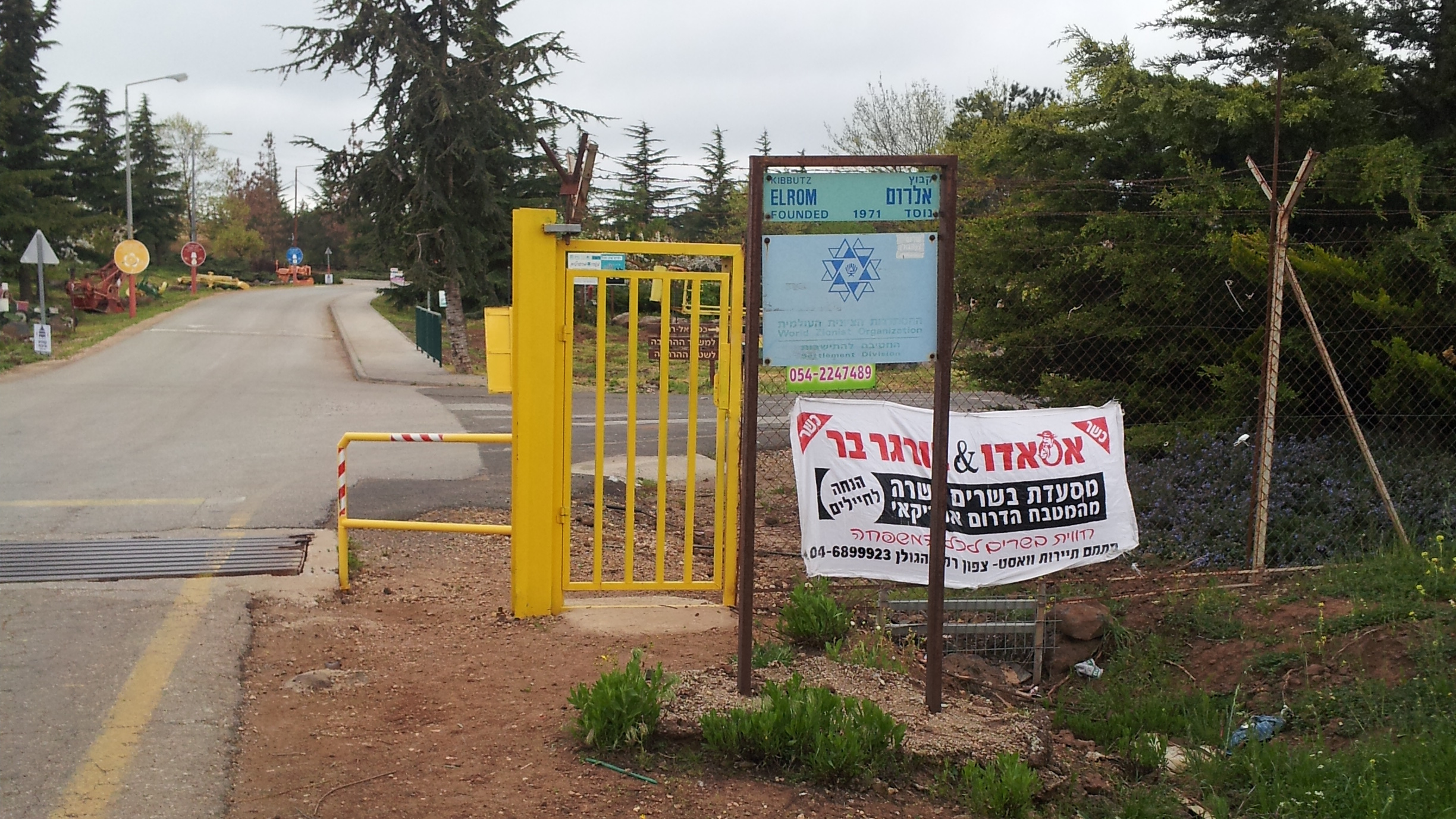
- Entrance into the kibbutz
- Etymology: To Height
- Location within the Golan Heights Location within the Golan Heights
- Coordinates: 33°10′46″N 35°46′17″E
- Country: Golan Heights (Internationally recognized as Syrian territory occupied by Israel.)
- District: Northern
- Subdistrict: Golan
- Council: Golan Regional Council
- Region: Golan Heights
- Affiliation: Kibbutz Movement
- Founded: 1971
- Founder: Members of the Zionist youth movement
- Population (2024): 620
- Website: kfar-elrom.com

El Rom (Hebrew: אֶל רוֹם, lit. To Height) is an Israeli settlement organized as a kibbutz in the northern Golan Heights. It is in the municipal territory of the Golan Regional Council. The international community considers Israeli settlements in the Golan Heights illegal under international law, but the Israeli government disputes this. In 2024 it had a population of 620.

== Geography ==
The kibbutz is about ten kilometers (6.2 mi) south of Mount Hermon, at an elevation of 1,050–1,070 meters (3,440–3,510 ft) above sea level. El Rom and the nearby moshav Odem are the two Jewish settlements in Israel with the highest elevation after Nimrod.

== History ==
The kibbutz was founded in 1971 by a core group of settlers from the Machanot HaOlim Zionist youth movement. Although they had intended to settle in Beit HaArava in the southern Jordan River Valley, they were eventually persuaded to move to the Golan Heights. The original settlement was shelled during the Yom Kippur War, and most buildings were repaired except for one or two prefabs.

== Climate ==
El Rom has a Mediterranean-type climate, with warm and dry summer followed by cold and humid winter. Being at the northern part of the Golan Heights and at an altitude of over one thousand meters (3,300 ft) above sea level gives it a unique year-round weather in comparison to most of Israel. Summer time, in between May and September, is dry with almost no precipitation at all and temperatures of 25–30 °C (77–86 °F) during the day in the hot months of July and August. Nights are mostly cool due to the continental wind blowing from the vast desert to the east. Winter temperature averages 7 °C (45 °F) in the cold months of January and February during the day and lows of 2–3 °C (36–37 °F), at times dropping down to −15 °C (5 °F). The rains start in September and go on until May, filling up the reservoirs and giving a lot of water to the Sea of Galilee. The annual precipitation averages 940 millimeters (37 in) of rain and occasional snow, but the last few years show lesser precipitation and higher temperatures. Fog is very common throughout the year.

== Economy ==
The economy is based primarily on agriculture. Crops include apples, pears, strawberries, and grapes for wine. A cider house producing British-style alcoholic cider operates on the kibbutz. They also raise cattle and chickens. In 1984, the kibbutz established El Rom Studios to provide an alternative employment opportunities and revenue stream. The studios command a large share of the market for adding subtitles as well as other translation services for film and television. In Israel, since foreign language movies and TV programs are rarely dubbed, there is a constant need to provide these services.

== Transportation ==
The Golan Regional Council operates three buses per day from El Rom to the Israeli city of Kiryat Shmona. The bus line also stops at Buq'ata, Mas'ade, Majdal Shams, and Neve Ativ. The bus ride to Kiryat Shmona takes approximately 35 minutes. El Rom is located close to Highway 98, a major road running through the Golan Heights.

== See also ==
- Israeli-occupied territories
- Status of territories occupied by Israel in 1967
