= Ortal (Israeli settlement) =

Israeli settlement in the Golan Heights

Ortal: אוֹרְטַל (Hebrew)
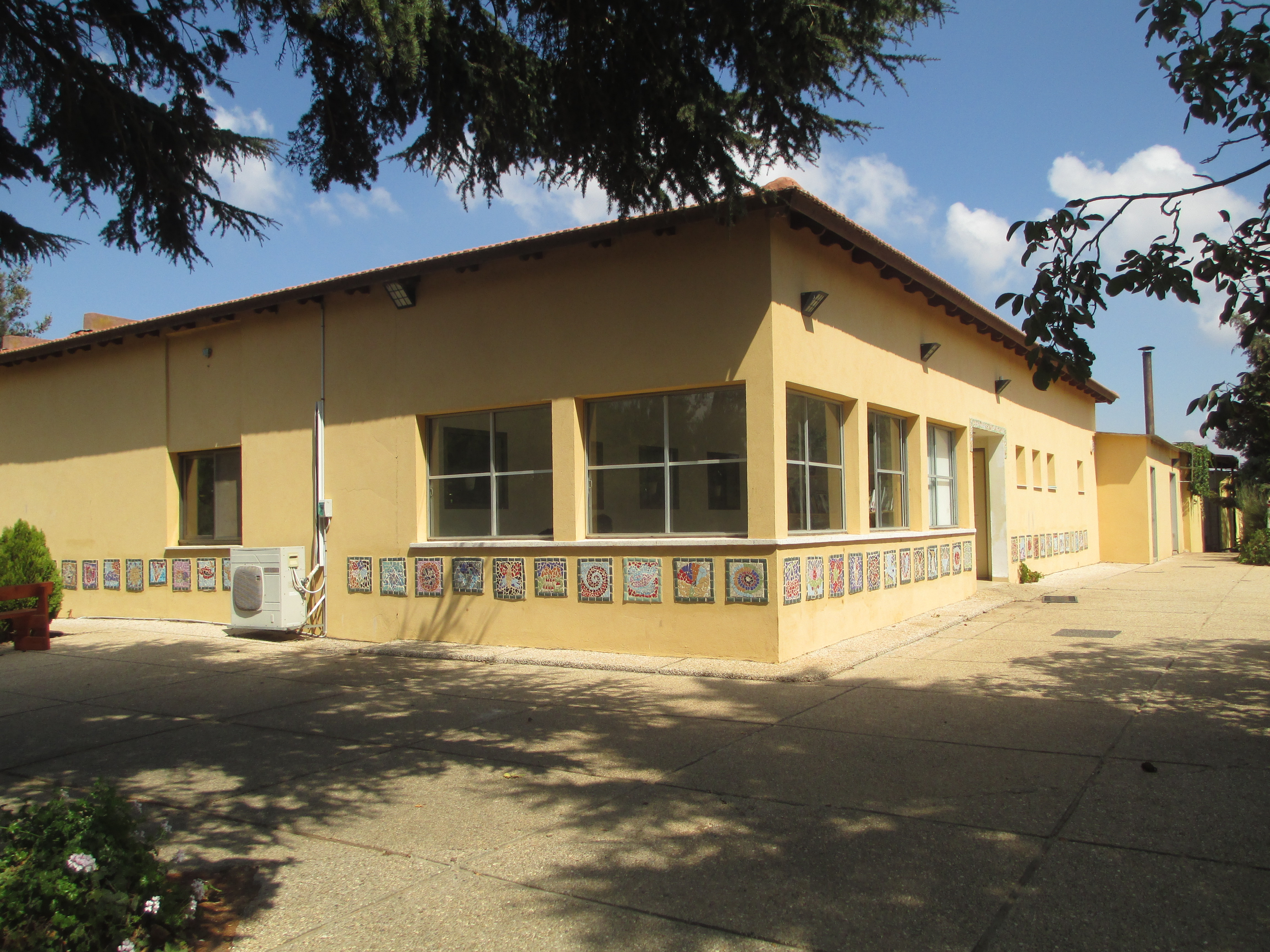
- Kibbutz dining room

- Location within the Golan Heights Location within the Golan Heights
- Coordinates: 33°5′6″N 35°45′41″E
- Country: Golan Heights (Internationally recognized as Syrian territory occupied by Israel.)
- District: Northern
- Subdistrict: Golan
- Council: Golan Regional Council
- Region: Golan Heights
- Affiliation: Kibbutz Movement
- Founded: 1978
- Population (2024): 374
- Website: ortal.org.il

Ortal (Hebrew: אוֹרְטַל) is an Israeli settlement organized as a kibbutz in the northern Golan Heights, which Israel administers as part of its sovereign territory. The settlement was established as a kibbutz after Israel occupied the area in the Six Day War in 1967. Located 915 meters above sea level and 20 kilometres (12 mi) northeast of Katzrin, it falls under the jurisdiction of Golan Regional Council. In 2024 it had a population of 374. The international community considers Israeli settlements in the Golan Heights illegal under international law, but the Israeli government disputes this.

== Economy ==
As of 2006, the kibbutz vineyard, affiliated with the Golan Heights Winery, produced three varieties of grapes: chardonnay, cabernet, and merlot.

== Transportation ==
The Golan Regional Council operates eight buses per day from Ortal to the Israeli city of Kiryat Shmona. The bus line begins at Katzrin, and also stops at Kidmat Tzvi, Ein Zivan, Merom Golan, and Kela Alon. The bus ride to Kiryat Shmona takes approximately 44 minutes. Ortal is located close to Highway 91, a major road running through the Golan Heights.

== See also ==
- Israeli-occupied territories
