= Kanaf =

Israeli settlement in the Golan Heights

Kanaf: כָּנָף (Hebrew)
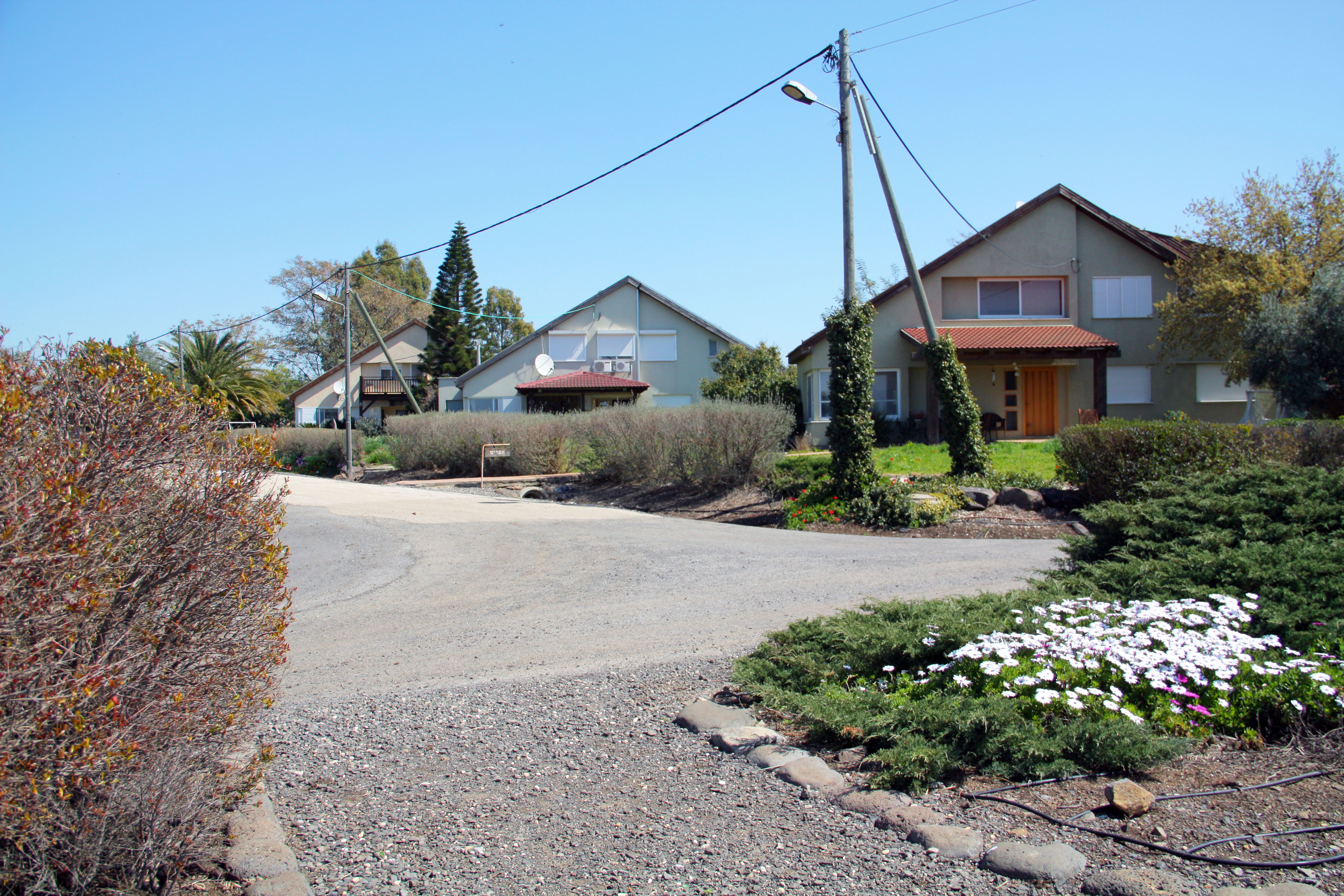
- Etymology: Wing
- Location within the Golan Heights Location within the Golan Heights
- Coordinates: 32°52′11″N 35°42′2″E
- Country: Golan Heights (Internationally recognized as Syrian territory occupied by Israel.)
- District: Northern
- Subdistrict: Golan
- Council: Golan
- Region: Golan Heights
- Affiliation: Moshavim Movement
- Founded: 1985
- Population (2024): 543

Kanaf (Hebrew: כָּנָף) is an Israeli settlement in the southern Golan Heights organized as a moshav shitufi, under the administration of Israel. One of four Golan settlements that overlook the Sea of Galilee, it falls under the jurisdiction of Golan Regional Council. The settlement began to be populated in 1991, and had a population of 543 in 2024.

The international community considers Israeli settlements in the Golan Heights illegal under international law, but the Israeli government disputes this.

== History ==
The establishment of Kanaf was approved by the government in the summer of 1984. In April 1985, members of the settlement group moved to a temporary site at Moshav Eliad for six years. In 1991, they moved to a permanent location near Mazra'at Kanaf (the site of a farm that had about 160 inhabitants when depopulated in 1967). Some of the residents were veterans of the Israeli Navy.

== Ancient synagogue ==
Near Kanaf, on the west bank of the Kanaf River, are the remains of a Byzantine-era synagogue. Called the Dir Aziz synagogue, it was first described by Laurence Oliphant in 1885. In his report were details of an extant three-meter-high wall, but it is believed to have collapsed in a 1920 earthquake. Features of the synagogue that have survived include a basalt stone floor, remains of eight pillars, and three benches. Archeologists recovered hundreds of Byzantine coins from beneath the floor of the synagogue. Olive presses, s cemetery and what may be a pottery workshop were documented in surveys of the site. In 1998–2004, excavation of the synagogue uncovered a unique basilica structure, an apse and a magnificent bimah.

The synagogue is unlike other Golan Heights synagogues in that when the worshipers faced south they were facing the structure's long wall rather than its wide one. In that regard, the synagogue shares a feature common to synagogues in the southern Hebron Hills.

== See also ==
- Ancient synagogues in Israel
