= Odem =

Israeli settlement in the Golan Heights

Odem: אֹדֶם (Hebrew)
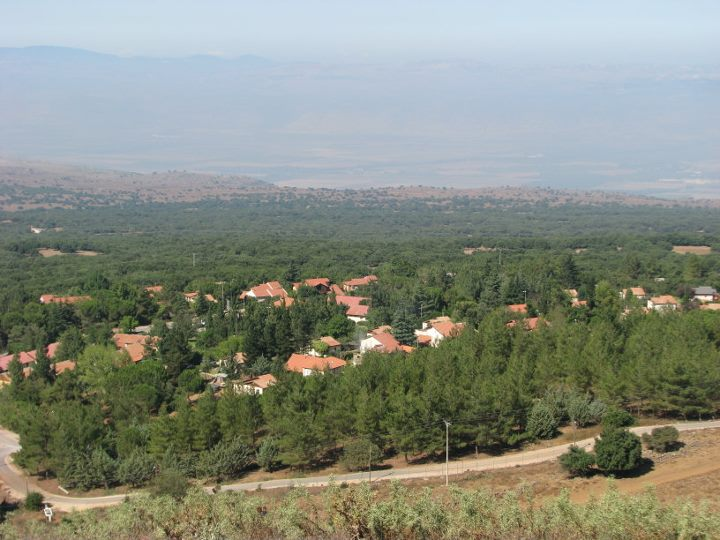

- Location within the Golan Heights Location within the Golan Heights
- Coordinates: 33°11′37″N 35°44′58″E
- Country: Golan Heights (Internationally recognized as Syrian territory occupied by Israel.)
- District: Northern
- Subdistrict: Golan
- Council: Golan
- Region: Golan Heights
- Affiliation: HaOved HaTzioni
- Founded: 1975
- Population (2024): 314

Odem (Hebrew: אֹדֶם or אודם) is an Israeli settlement and moshav shitufi in the northern part of the Golan Heights. Located on Mount Odem, at a height of 1,090 meters (3,580 ft) above sea level, it is the second-highest town in Israel and the Israeli-occupied territories. It is surrounded by the Odem Forest and falls under the jurisdiction of Golan Regional Council. In 2024 it had a population of 314.

The international community considers Israeli settlements in the Golan Heights illegal under international law, but the Israeli government disputes this.

== Etymology ==
Odem means ruby and signifies the red color. In this case it refers to the color of the rocks of Mount Odem, an extinct volcano.

== History ==
The Israeli government approved the establishment of the settlement in 1975, and a group of young people occupied an abandoned Syrian military base nearby. Most of these original settlers left, however, because of the frigid temperatures and strong winds. Those that remained were joined in 1981 by a new group, and the current settlement was established. The population was about 150 in 1993, about one-third of them children.

== Economy ==
The chief industries are a factory that manufactures plastic for furniture and an optics factory that manufactures protective lenses and safety goggles. Odem Mountain Winery is also located there.

== See also ==
- Israeli Military Governorate
