= Merom Golan =

Israeli settlement in the Golan Heights

Merom Golan: מרום גולן (Hebrew)
- Kibbutz
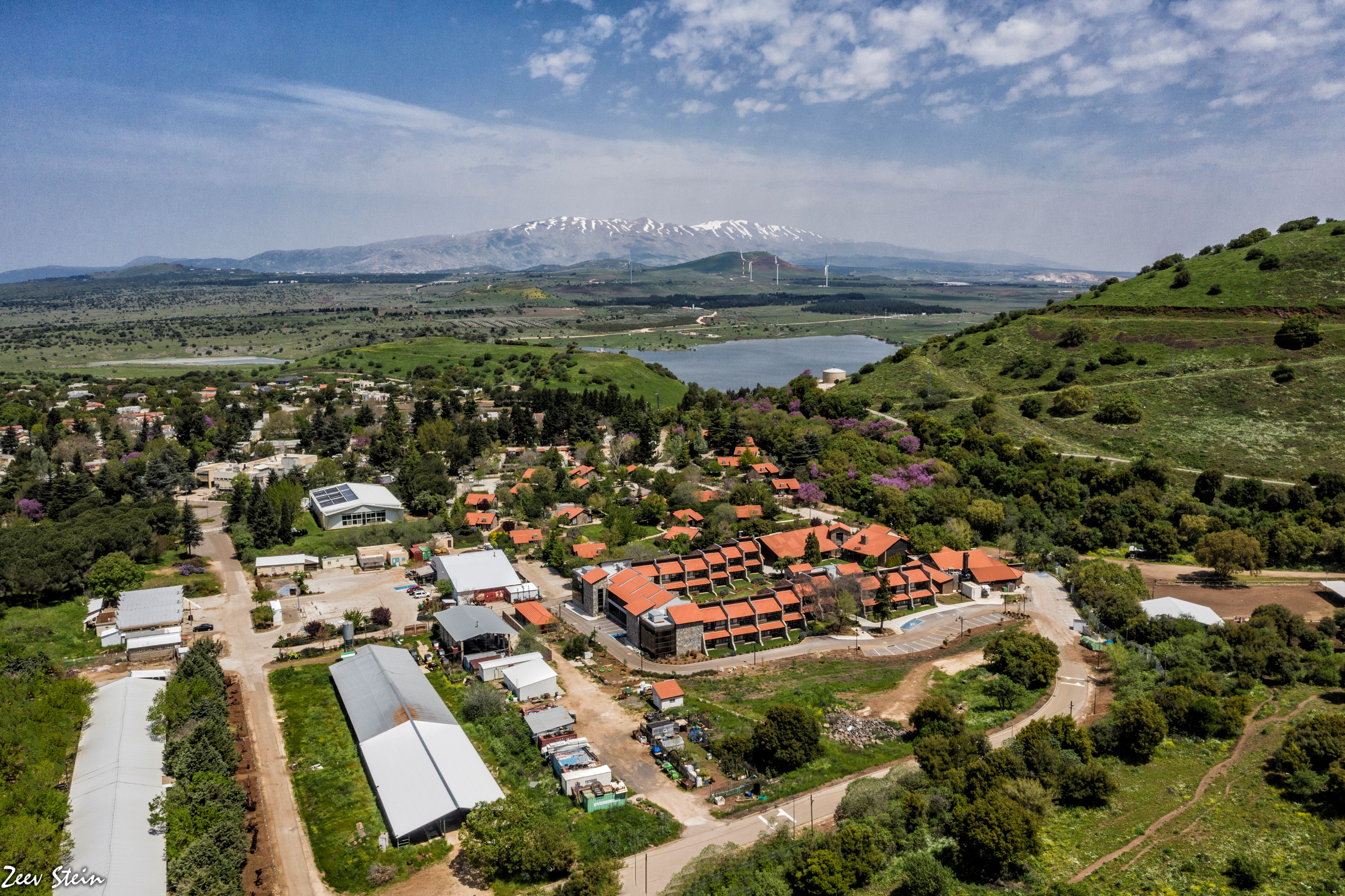
- View of Merom Golan

- Location within the Golan Heights Location within the Golan Heights
- Coordinates: 33°08′00″N 35°46′33″E
- Country: Golan Heights (Internationally recognized as Syrian territory occupied by Israel.)
- District: Northern
- Subdistrict: Golan
- Council: Golan
- Affiliation: Kibbutz Movement
- Founded: 14 July 1967; 59 years ago
- Population (2024): 818
- Website: merom-golan.org.il

Merom Golan (Hebrew: מרום גולן) is an Israeli settlement organized as a kibbutz in the Golan Heights. Located at the bottom of the volcanic crater of Mount Bental, it falls under the jurisdiction of Golan Regional Council. In 2024, it had a population of 818.

The international community considers Israeli settlements in the Golan Heights illegal under international law, but the Israeli government disputes this. The Golan Heights region is internationally recognized as Syrian territory, occupied by Israel since 1967. Israel views it as part of its sovereign territory ever since the passage of the Golan Heights Law, which applied Israeli civilian law to it.

== History ==
Merom Golan was established on 14 July 1967 with funds from the Upper Galilee Regional Council on the site of the abandoned Syrian military camp of Aleika, and was the first Israeli settlement to be established in the Golan Heights after the Six-Day War, about a month after the end of the war. Initially, the kibbutz was called Golan, and in November 1968 its name was changed to Merom Golan.

Between the years 1969 and 1973, Merom Golan was shelled many times by the Syrian army. In March 1972, the settlement moved to its current location, and this location also suffered many shellings. During the Yom Kippur War, the women and children were evacuated to Beit HaShita and remained there until the end of the fighting. However, the settlement was also shelled by the Syrians after that.

== Geography ==
=== Climate ===
Merom Golan had the lowest temperature ever recorded by an Israeli weather station: -14.2° C. The previous record was -13.7C in the Beit Netofa Valley.

Climate data for Merom Golan (Temperature: 1995–2010, Precipitation: 1980-2010)
Month	Jan	Feb	Mar	Apr	May	Jun	Jul	Aug	Sep	Oct	Nov	Dec	Year
Record high °C (°F)	21.2 (70.2)	22.0 (71.6)	29.7 (85.5)	33.3 (91.9)	38.2 (100.8)	38.0 (100.4)	40.8 (105.4)	41.4 (106.5)	38.3 (100.9)	35.1 (95.2)	28.6 (83.5)	24.2 (75.6)	41.4 (106.5)
Mean daily maximum °C (°F)	9.9 (49.8)	11.0 (51.8)	14.5 (58.1)	18.8 (65.8)	24.5 (76.1)	27.7 (81.9)	29.2 (84.6)	29.4 (84.9)	27.7 (81.9)	24.1 (75.4)	17.5 (63.5)	12.3 (54.1)	20.6 (69.0)
Daily mean °C (°F)	5.7 (42.3)	6.5 (43.7)	9.3 (48.7)	12.8 (55.0)	17.2 (63.0)	20.7 (69.3)	23.1 (73.6)	23.1 (73.6)	20.9 (69.6)	17.5 (63.5)	11.8 (53.2)	7.9 (46.2)	14.7 (58.5)
Mean daily minimum °C (°F)	1.5 (34.7)	2.0 (35.6)	4.1 (39.4)	6.8 (44.2)	10.0 (50.0)	13.8 (56.8)	17.0 (62.6)	16.8 (62.2)	14.1 (57.4)	10.9 (51.6)	6.1 (43.0)	3.4 (38.1)	8.9 (48.0)
Record low °C (°F)	−14.2 (6.4)	−12.5 (9.5)	−6.7 (19.9)	−4.5 (23.9)	−0.2 (31.6)	4.0 (39.2)	7.7 (45.9)	6.7 (44.1)	3.4 (38.1)	−2.0 (28.4)	−6.1 (21.0)	−8.8 (16.2)	−14.2 (6.4)
Average rainfall mm (inches)	201 (7.9)	196 (7.7)	115 (4.5)	40 (1.6)	9.1 (0.36)	0 (0)	0 (0)	0 (0)	1.9 (0.07)	22 (0.9)	86 (3.4)	159 (6.3)	830 (32.73)
Average rainy days (≥ 0.1 mm)	13	13	10	5	2.0	0.5	0.1	0	0.7	5	8	11	68.3
Average relative humidity (%)	80	79	73	64	57	57	60	67	65	62	69	78	68
Source: Israel Meteorological Service

== Transportation ==
The Golan Regional Council operates eight buses per day from Merom Golan to the Israeli city of Kiryat Shmona. The bus line begins at Katzrin, and also stops at Kidmat Tzvi, Ortal, Ein Zivan, and Kela Alon. The bus ride to Kiryat Shmona takes approximately 31 minutes. Merom Golan is located close to Highway 959, which runs east-west through the northern Golan Heights.

== Notable people ==
- Yehuda Harel (born 1934), former politician
- Joop de Jong (born 1951), Israeli-Dutch sculptor
