= Yonatan (Israeli settlement) =

Israeli settlement in the Golan Heights

Yonatan: יוֹנָתָן (Hebrew)
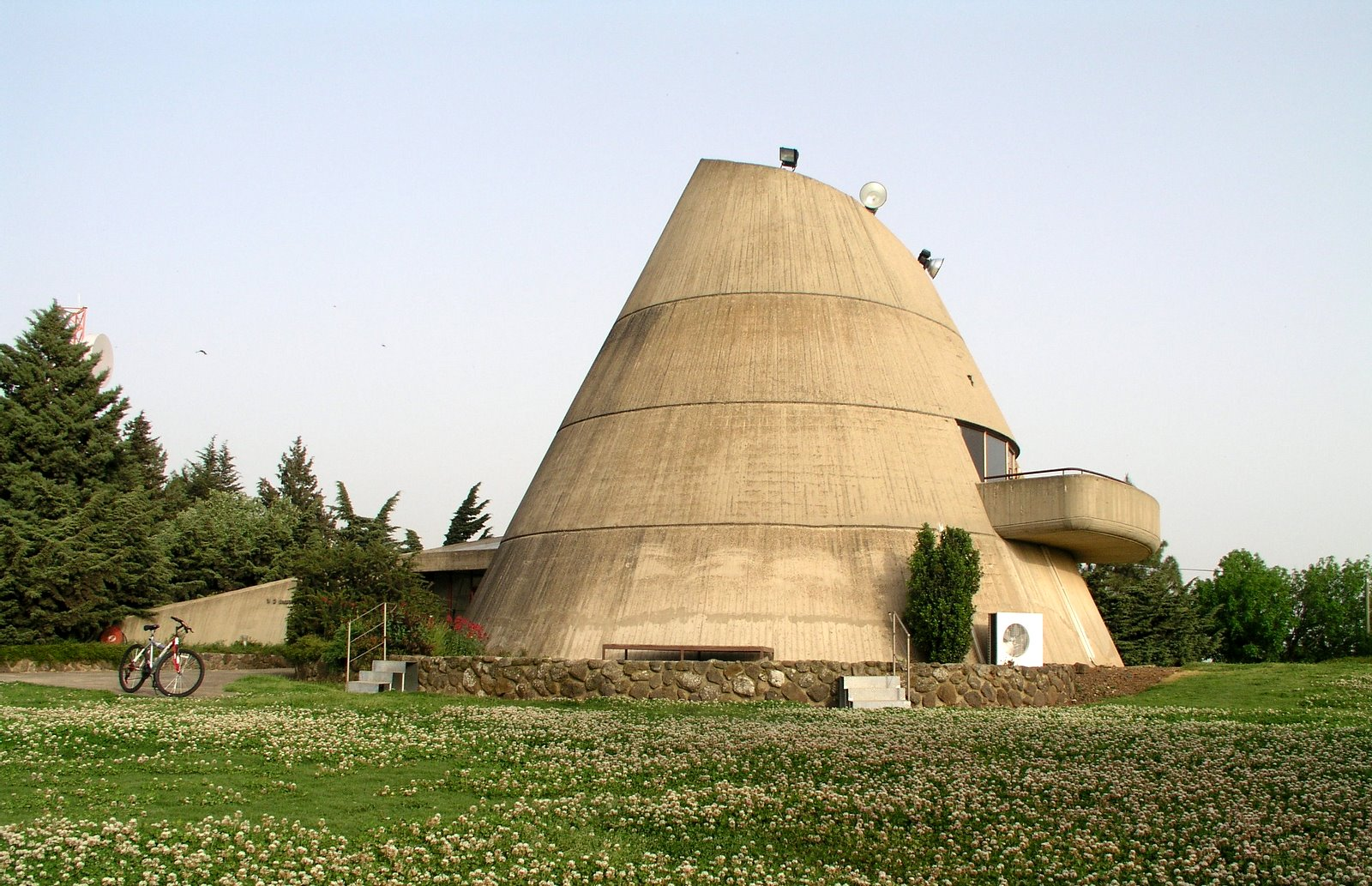
- The Cultural Centre building in the moshav

- Location within the Golan Heights Location within the Golan Heights
- Coordinates: 32°56′11″N 35°47′40″E
- Country: Golan Heights (Internationally recognized as Syrian territory occupied by Israel.)
- District: Northern
- Subdistrict: Golan
- Council: Golan
- Region: Golan Heights
- Affiliation: Hapoel HaMizrachi
- Founded: 1975
- Population (2024): 895

Yonatan (Hebrew: יוֹנָתָן) is an Israeli settlement and moshav located in the central Golan Heights. Initially a moshav shitufi, it underwent a privatization process to become a community settlement. The settlement is affiliated with the Hapoel HaMizrachi movement, and is under the jurisdiction of Golan Regional Council. In 2024 it had a population of 895.

The international community considers Israeli settlements in the Golan Heights illegal under international law, but the Israeli government disputes this.

== Etymology ==
The settlement is named after Yonatan Rosenman, who was killed while operating a tank during the Yom Kippur War.

== See also ==
- Israeli-occupied territories
