= Ani'am =

Israeli settlement in the Golan Heights

Ani'am אֲנִיעָם

Hebrew transcription(s)
  - Also spelled: Aniam (unofficial)
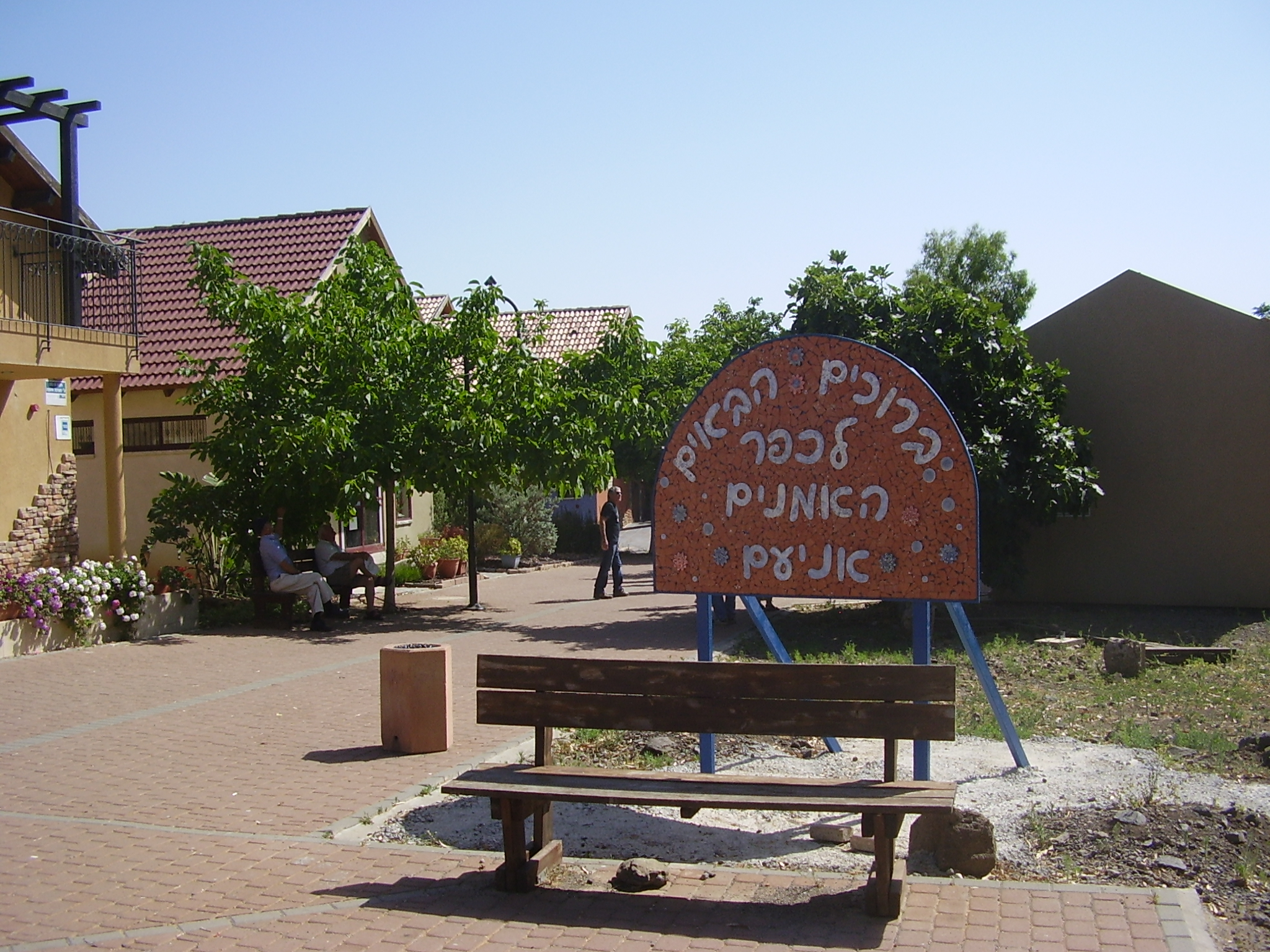
- The entrance to the Artists' Quarter in Ani'am

- Location within the Golan Heights Location within the Golan Heights
- Coordinates: 32°57′28″N 35°44′25″E
- Country: Israel
- District: HaTsafon
- Subdistrict: Golan
- Council: Golan
- Founded: 1978

Population (2024)
  - Total: 475

Aniam (Hebrew: אֲנִיעָם) is an Israeli settlement organized as a moshav located in the Golan Heights. The settlement was built in 1978 and falls under the municipal jurisdiction of the Golan Regional Council. In 2024 it had a population of 475.

The international community considers Israeli settlements in the Golan Heights illegal under international law, but the Israeli government disputes this.

== Etymology ==
The name Ani'am is derived from a member of the Menashe tribe (1 Chronicles 7:19), whose tribal area included the Golan Heights.

== Economy ==
The economy of Ani'am is based on the provision of engineering services, on agriculture (mango, citrus vines and grapes for the production of wine and flowers) and the raising of Merino sheep. The village also has a distribution board factory. Many artists have settled in Ani'am and have created the "Artists' boulevard" in the settlement, with art galleries where each artist has built a structure unique to his or her artistic style. There are also boutiques, a pub-restaurant as well as guest cabins in Ani'am.

== See also ==
- Israeli-occupied territories
- Israeli settlement
