= Ein Zivan =

Israeli settlement in the Golan Heights

Ein Zivan: עֵין זִיוָן (Hebrew)
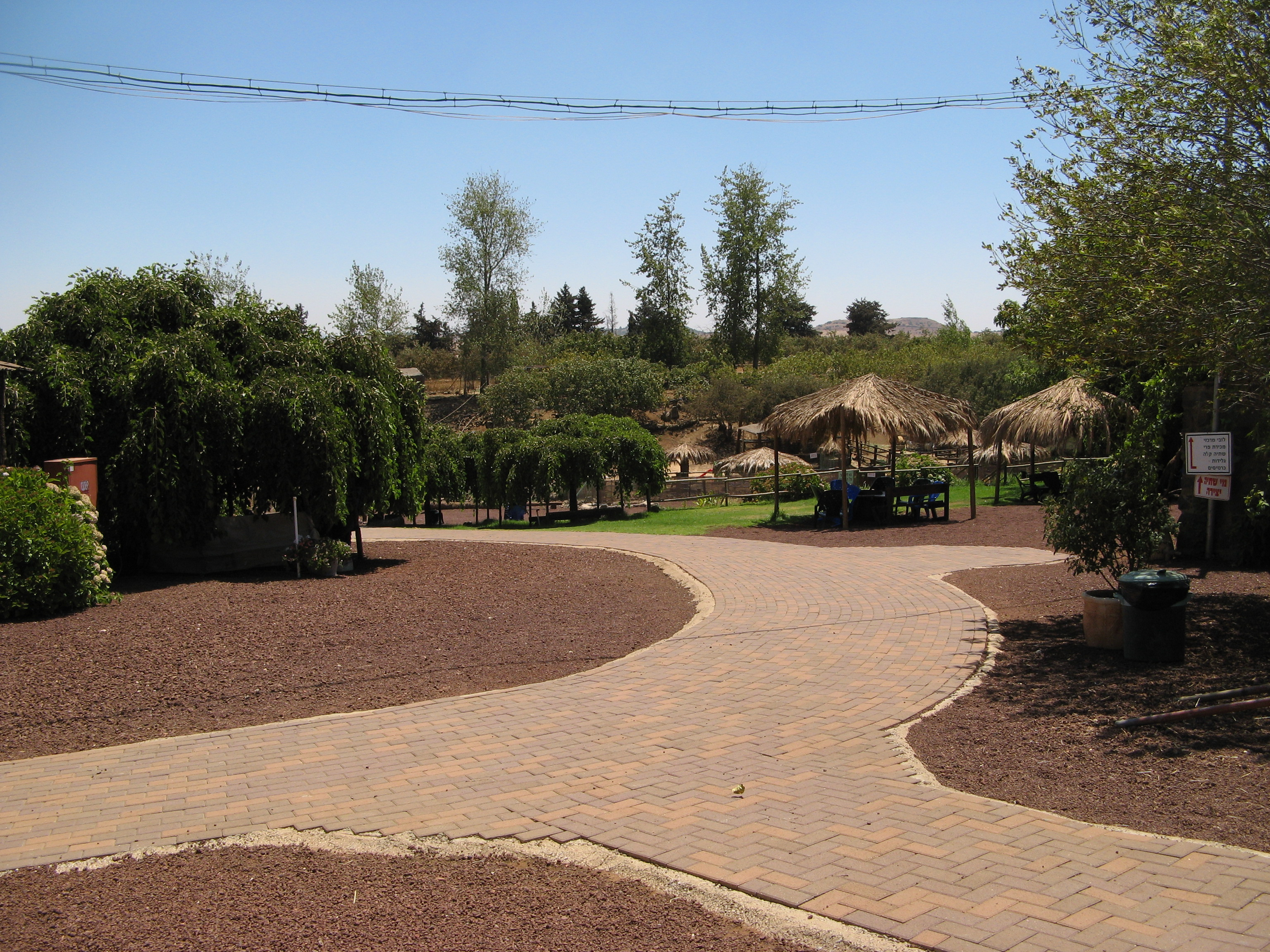

- Location within the Golan Heights, Syria Location within Israeli-occupied Golan Heights
- Coordinates: 33°05′47″N 35°47′47″E
- Country: Golan Heights (Internationally recognized as Syrian territory occupied by Israel.)
- District: Northern
- Subdistrict: Golan
- Council: Golan
- Syrian Governorate: Quneitra
- Affiliation: Kibbutz Movement
- Population (2024): 534

Ein Zivan (Hebrew: עֵין זִיוָן) is an Israeli settlement organized as a kibbutz in the northern Golan Heights. It is under the jurisdiction of the Golan Regional Council. The international community considers Israeli settlements in the Golan Heights illegal under international law, but the Israeli government disputes this. In 2024 it had a population of 534.

== History ==
The kibbutz was founded in 1968 by Israeli-born youth with a kibbutz background. Later they were joined by Gar'inei Nahal (Nahal core groups) and volunteers from abroad. In the 2000s a community expansion program was open to accommodate families seeking a high quality of life away from urban centers. The population of Ein Zivan today consists thus of kibbutz members (43 families) and residents (40 families). It was the first kibbutz to initiate the process of privatization of common property.

== Demography ==
In November 2011 the kibbutz had a population of 83 families (243 people).

== Economy ==
Ein Zivan's economy is based mostly on agriculture. It has one of the largest deciduous orchards, containing apples, cherries, peaches, pears and nectarines. The northern kibbutz also has vineyards, linked to the Golan Heights Winery. Chocolatier Carina Chaplinsky, a new immigrant from Argentina, runs a chocolate business at the kibbutz that includes a factory, a boutique outlet, a workshop and tasting rooms. The Pelter Winery, established in 2002, is also located at Ein Zivan. The winery produced 85,000 bottles in 2010. Winemaker Tal Pelter has been hailed by Haaretz wine critic Daniel Rogov as a "rising star". Ein Zivan also runs a bed and breakfast establishment, Lan BaGolan.

== Transportation ==
The Golan Regional Council operates eight buses per day from Ein Zivan to the Israeli city of Kiryat Shmona. The bus line begins at Katzrin, and also stops at Kidmat Tzvi, Ortal, Merom Golan, and Kela Alon. The bus ride to Kiryat Shmona takes approximately 39 minutes. Ein Zivan is located at the junction of Highway 91 and Highway 98, two major roads running through the Golan Heights.

== See also ==
- Commune
- Israeli wine
- Israeli-occupied territories
