= Metzar =

Israeli settlement in the Golan Heights

Metzar: מֵיצָר (Hebrew)
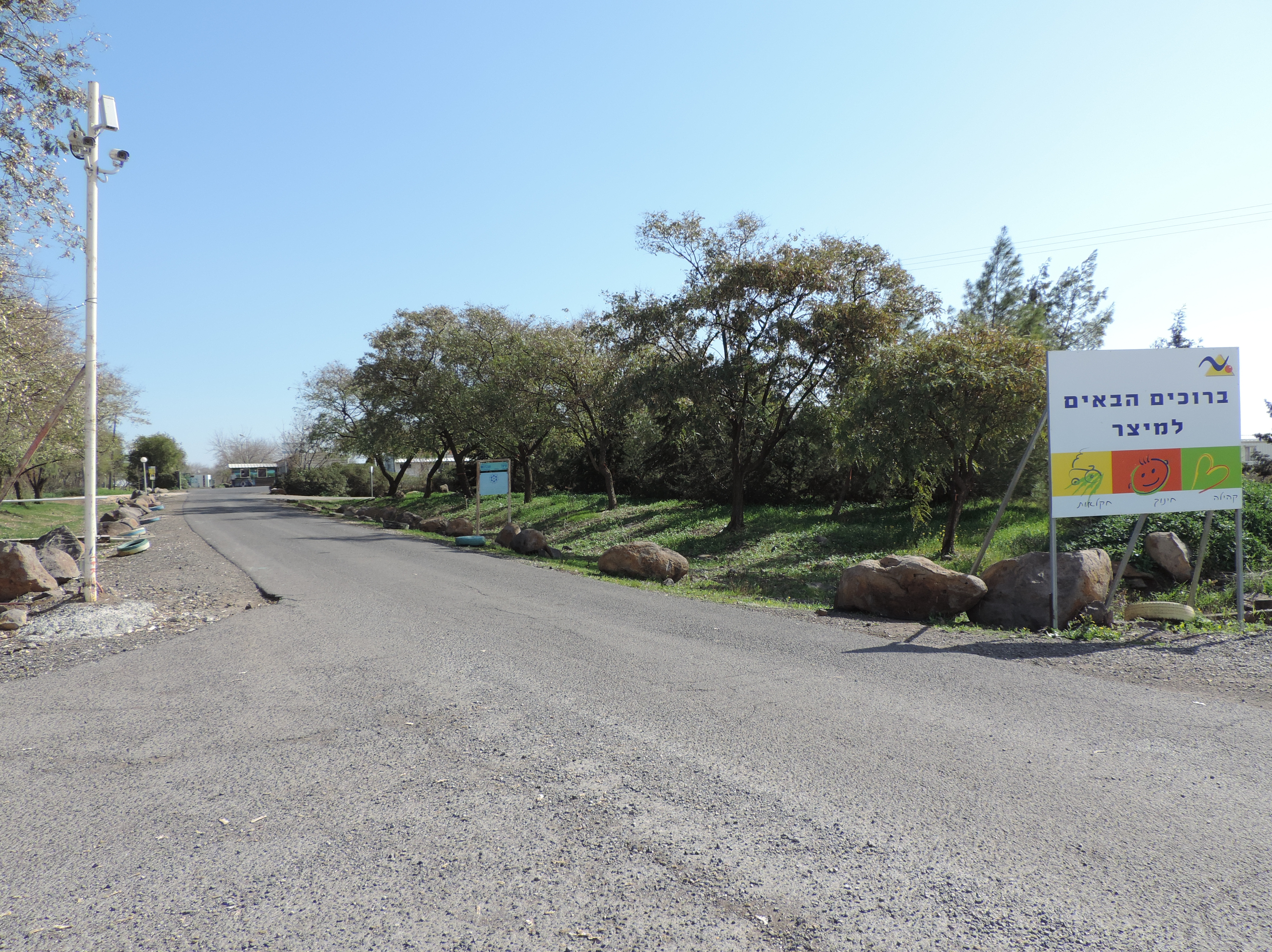
- Settlement entrance

- Location within the Golan Heights Location within the Golan Heights
- Coordinates: 32°46′05″N 35°44′13″E
- Country: Golan Heights (Internationally recognized as Syrian territory occupied by Israel.)
- District: Northern
- Subdistrict: Golan
- Council: Golan
- Region: Golan Heights
- Affiliation: Kibbutz Movement
- Founded: 1981
- Population (2024): 379

Metzar (Hebrew: מֵיצָר) is an Israeli settlement organized as a kibbutz in the southern Golan Heights. The settlement was established as a kibbutz after Israel occupied the area in the Six Day War in 1967. The 29th settlement on the Golan Heights, it falls under the jurisdiction of Golan Regional Council. In 2024 it had a population of 379.

The international community considers Israeli settlements in the Golan Heights illegal under international law, but the Israeli government disputes this.

== See also ==
- Israeli-occupied territories
