= List of rivers of Israel =

This is a list of rivers of Israel. This list is arranged by drainage basin, with respective tributaries indented under each larger stream's name.

Nahal (Hebrew, wiktionary:נחל) and Wadi (Arabic) commonly translate to Stream, more seldom River. Both words, when used as common nouns, also signify '(stream/river) valley'.

Streams entirely on the West Bank are not listed here.

== Mediterranean Sea ==
Rivers emptying into the Mediterranean Sea, listed from north to south.

- Nahal Betzet (Arabic: Wadi Karkara)
- Nahal Kziv (Arabic: Wadi al-Qarn)
- Ga'aton River
  - Nahal Meirav
- Na'aman River (Hebrew: Nahal Na'aman, Arabic: Nahr al-Na'mein), ancient Belus River
- Kishon River
  - Nahal Ma'apilim (Arabic: Wadi Abu Alhiya), formerly Nahal Nahash
- Nahal Daliya/Dalya/Dalia; ends in estuary NW of Zichron Ya'akov and Kibbutz Ma'ayan Zvi, among fish ponds continuing south to Kibbutz Ma'agan Michael and Nahal Taninim
- Nahal Taninim (Arabic: Wadi az-Zarqa); basin and tributaries include 'Ada, Barkan, Alona and Mishmarot streams
- Hadera Stream (Arabic: Nahr Akhdar)
- Nahal Alexander
- Nahal Poleg (Arabic: Wadi al-Faliq)
- Yarkon River
  - Wadi Qana or Qanah (Hebrew: Nahal Qanah)
  - Ayalon River (Arabic name: Wadi Musrara)
    - Wadi Natuf/Nahal Natuf; flows into the Ayalon near Ben Gurion Airport; tributary Wadi Beitunia/Nahal Modi'im or Modi'in reaches it within Latrun salient
  - Nahal Shillo or Shiloh (Arabic names in the West Bank change: Wadi Ali, Wadi Amuriya, etc.)
- Nahal Sorek (Arabic: Wadi al-Sarar)
- Lakhish River (Arabic: Wadi Suqrir)
  - Nahal Guvrin/Guvrin Stream, passes by Beit Guvrin, mouth north of Masu'ot Yitzhak
- Nahal Shikma or Shiqma (Arabic: Wadi el-Hesi), location of an important First World War-time battle
- HaBesor Stream (Arabic: Wadi Ghazzeh/Gaza [downstream] and Wadi esh-Shallaleh [upstream])
  - Nahal Gerar (Arabic: Wadi esh-Sheri'a / Wady el Sharia)
  - Nahal Be'er Sheva
    - Nahal Hevron (English: Hebron River or Stream, Arabic: Wadi al-Samen or Wadi al-Khalil)

== Dead Sea ==
Rivers emptying into the Dead Sea. Tributaries of the Jordan River are listed north to south, where needed east to west.

=== Jordan River and its tributaries ===
- Jordan River

==== From the foothills of Mount Hermon and South Lebanon ====
  - Banias River (Hebrew: Nahal Hermon)
  - Dan River
  - Hasbani River (Hebrew: Nahal Snir)
  - Ayun Stream

==== From Galilee to the Upper Jordan River ====
  - Dishon Stream (Arabic: Wadi al-Hindaj etc.)
  - Hazor Stream
  - Mahanayim Stream
  - Rosh Pina Stream

==== From the Golan to the Sea of Galilee ====
The Golan Heights, by international law, are part of Syria. Much of the region has been annexed by Israel, a move only recognised by the United States. Some of the Golan Heights streams cross into internationally recognised Israeli territory, while some don't. For the sake of a comprehensive hydrological overview, the Golan tributaries of the Jordan River via the lake are tentatively listed here for now.

Five streams - the Jordan plus four more - run through the Bethsaida Valley (Batikha or Buteikha in Arabic), the first four forming the Meshushim and Zaki Lagoons before reaching the Sea of Galilee.

  - Meshushim River (Hebrew), Wadi el-Hawa/Fakhura/Zaki (Arabic). Tributaries not reaching Israel:
    - Katzrin Stream (intermittent)
    - Zavitan Stream
      - Yosifon Stream (Nahal Yosifon)
  - Yehudiya River (see Yehudiya, Yehudiya Forest Nature Reserve)
    - Batra Stream
  - Daliyot River. Tributaries not reaching Israel:
    - Gamla Stream (Nahal Gamla)
      - Bazelet Stream (Nahal Bazelet)
  - Sfamnun Stream
  - Kanaf Stream
  - Samakh Stream. Tributary not reaching Israel:
    - El Al Stream (Nahal El Al)
  - En Gev Stream (Nahal En Gev), commonly spelled Ein Gev
  - Metzar/Meitsar Stream (Nahal Metzar)

==== From Galilee to the Sea of Galilee ====
  - Nahal Korazim
  - Nahal Amud (Arabic: Wadi al-Amud)
  - Nahal Tzalmon or Zalmon (Arabic: Wadi al-Rubudiyeh)
  - Nahal Arbel (Arabic: Wadi al-Hamam)

==== From Galilee to the Lower Jordan River ====
  - Nahal Yavne’el (Arabic: Wadi Fidjdjas, sometimes spelled Fijas)
  - Yarmouk River
  - Nahal Tavor (English: Tabor Stream, Tavor Stream)
  - Nahal Yissakhar

==== From the Valleys to the Jordan River ====
  - Harod Stream ("Nahal Harod", "Wadi Jalud" in Arabic)

The West Bank tributaries are not listed here. This concerns creeks entirely on the West Bank, from spring to the Dead Sea.

=== From the Judaean desert to the Dead Sea ===
- Nahal Yishai (West Bank and Israel)
- Nahal David, Wadi Sdeir (West Bank and Israel)
- Nahal Arugot (West Bank and Israel); Arabic names: Wadi el-Jihar (upper course), Wadi el-Ghar (central section) and Wadi Areijeh (lower course)
- Nahal Tsruya (West Bank and Israel)
- Nahal Hever (West Bank and Israel)
- Nahal Asa'el (West Bank and Israel)
- Nahal Mishmar (mostly Israel)
- Nahal Miflat (Israel)
- Tze'elim Stream (Israel)
    - Nahal Keresh (West Bank and Israel)
    - Nahal Harduf (West Bank and Israel)
      - Nahal Keresh
      - Nahal Tzaftzafa
    - Nahal Shafan (West Bank and Israel)
      - Nahal Arnav
      - Nahal Adashah (West Bank and Israel)
        - Nahal Betah, Nahal Hardon, Nahal Nazir, Nahal Hatzron, Nahal Badar

=== From the Negev to the Dead Sea ===
- Nahal Zin, related to the Zin Desert (see also 2014 Israeli oil spill)

=== Negev to Arava Valley to the Dead Sea ===
- Nahal HaArava
  - Nahal Neqarot
    - Nahal Ramon
  - Nahal Shivya
  - Nahal Paran
  - Nahal Hiyyon

== Red Sea (Gulf of Eilat) ==
Streams emptying into the Gulf of Eilat of the Red Sea.

- Nahal Shahmon
- Nahal Shlomo (lit. Solomon Stream)

== See also ==
- Geography of Palestine: Rivers and lakes
