= Highway 92 (Israel-Syria) =

Highway in Israel

Coordinates: 32°47′19″N 35°38′33″E

Highway 92
- כביש 92
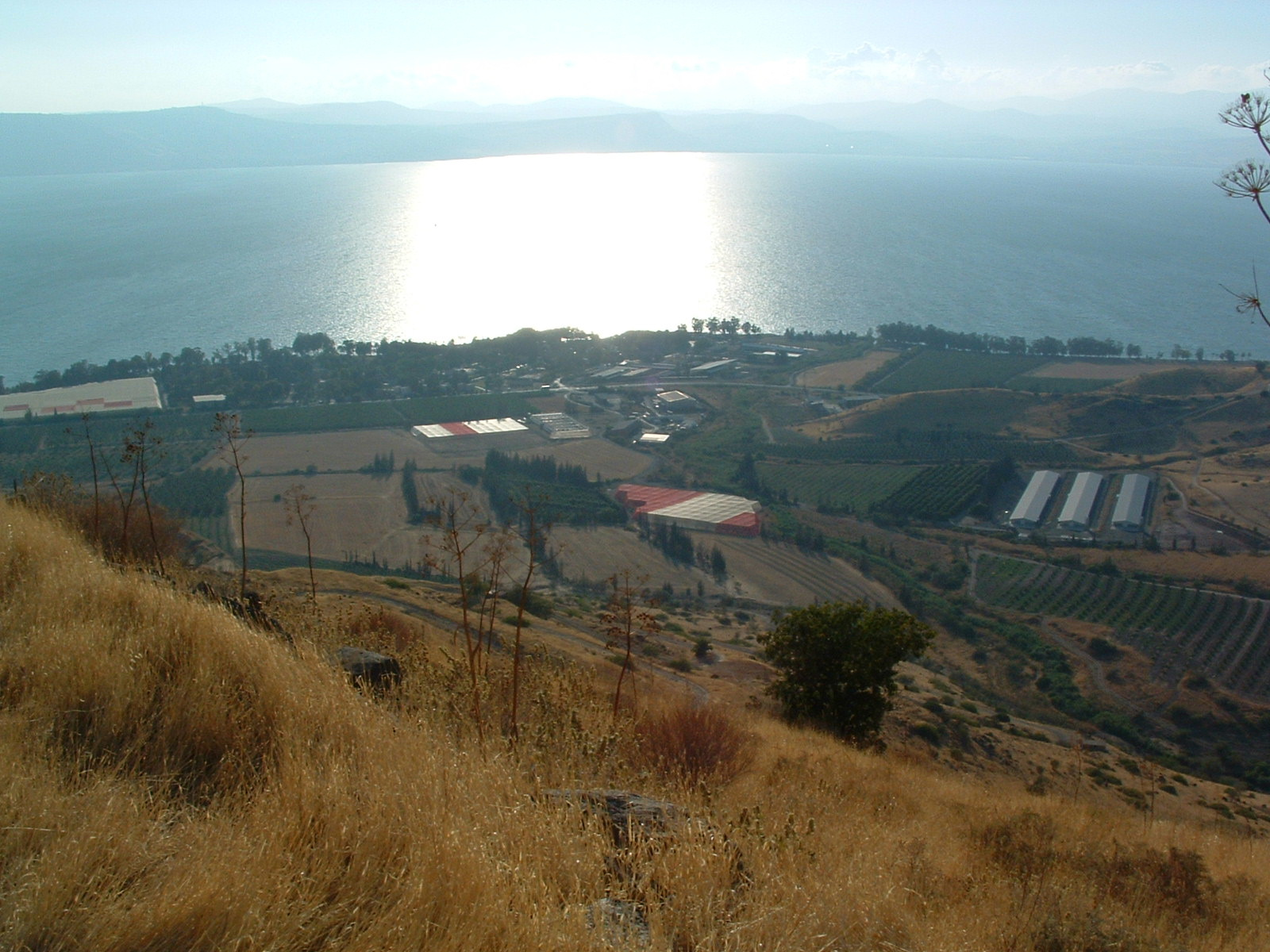
- Highway 92 near Ein Gev

Route information
- Length: 26.15 km (16.25 mi)

Major junctions
- South end: Samakh Junction
- North end: Yehudiya Junction

Location
- Country: Israel

Highway system
- Roads in Israel; Highways
← Highway 91	→ Highway 98

Highway 92 is a north-south highway in northeastern Israel and in the Golan Heights. It follows the eastern edge of the Kinneret from Ma'agan junction in the south at Highway 98 to Yehudiya junction in the north at Highway 87. It is 26.15 km long.

Route 92 is maintained by the National Roads Company of Israel.

== History ==
The southern part of the road, from Samakh to Ein Gev, was paved immediately after the end of the 1948 Palestine war as part of Israel's efforts to establish facts on the ground in the demilitarized territories according to the armistice agreements between Israel and Syria and was inaugurated in June 1950. Solel Boneh paved the road, one-third in concrete and the rest asphalt. The rest of the road was paved in stages. At the end of 1969, the road was extended from Ein Gev to Kursi, as part of the construction of Route 789 from Kursi to Afik. It was already planned to pave Highway 87 which would go up from the Kfar Nahum junction to the Golan and Highway 92 was planned to connect to this road, in such a way that the Kinneret is surrounded by the road. The road was inaugurated in April 1978.

== Junctions and interchanges (south to north) ==
The junction from Kursi to the Bethsaida Valley is situated in territory internationally recognized as part of Syria (the Quneitra Governorate), under Israeli occupation since 1967.

District	Location	km	mi	Name	Destinations	Notes
Northern	Samakh	0.00	0.00	צומת צמח (Samakh Junction)	Highway 90	
Northern	Ma'agan	1.28	0.80	צומת מעגן (Ma'agan Junction)	Highway 98	
Northern	Tel Katzir	3.39	2.11	צומת תל קציר (Tel Katzir Junction)	Entrance to Tel Katzir	
Northern	HaOn	4.37	2.72	צומת האון (HaOn Junction)	Entrance to HaOn	
Northern	Ein Gev	11.72	7.28	צומת עין גבר (Ein Gev Junction)	Entrance to Ein Gev	
Northern	Kursi	16.86	10.48	צומת כורסי (Kursi Junction)	Route 789	
Northern	Ramot	20.76	12.90	צומת רמות (Ramot Junction)	Entrance to Ramot	
Northern	Ma'ale Gamla	23.30	14.48	צומת מעלה גמלא (Ma'ale Gamla Junction)	Route 869	
Northern	Bethsaida Valley	26.15	16.25	צומת יהודיה (Yehudiya Junction)	Highway 87	
1.000 mi = 1.609 km; 1.000 km = 0.621 mi

== Places of interest near Highway 92 ==
- Kibbutz HaOn
- Monument for Turkish soldiers
- Sussita archaeological site
- Kursi national park
- Luna-Gal beach
- Bethsaida, Bethsaida Valley and nature reserve

== See also ==
- List of highways in Israel
