= Tsemah Junction =

Tsemah Junction צומת צמח
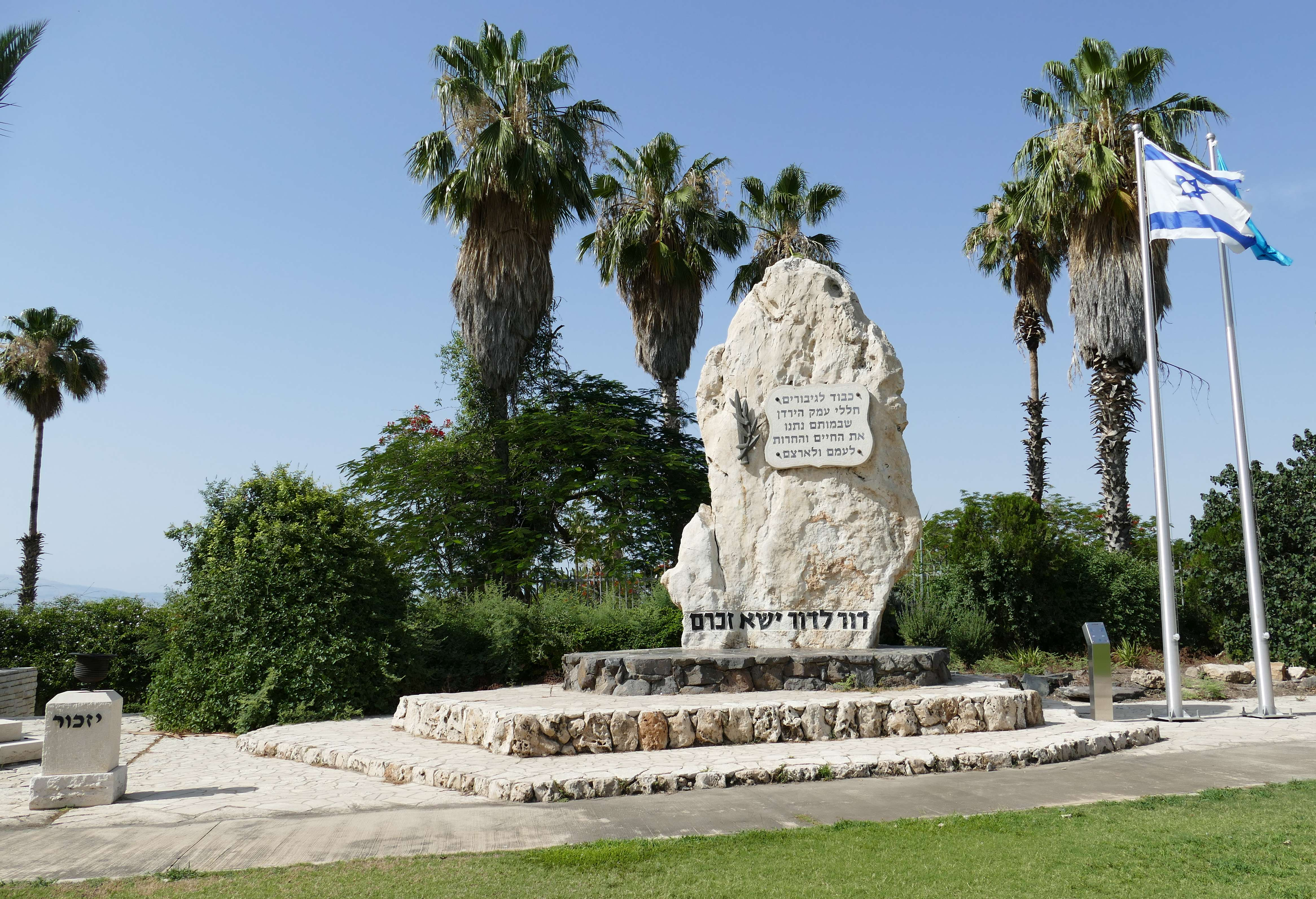
- War Memorial at the Junction
- Interactive map of Tsemah Junction צומת צמח

Location
- Galilee, Israel
- Coordinates: 32°42′17″N 35°35′11″E
- Roads at junction: Highway 90; Highway 92

Construction
- Type: Roundabout intersection
- Opened: 1920s

Tsemah Junction (Hebrew: צומת צמח, Tzomet Tzemach) is a road junction at the southern tip of the Sea of Galilee, where Highway 90 continues along the western shore of the lake towards Tiberias, while Highway 92 splits off to follow the eastern shore. A few kilometres to the east Highway 98 branches off Highway 92 and climbs up to the Golan Heights plateau.

== Etymology ==
According to Strong's Concordance, the Hebrew word tsemach signifies 'branch','sprout' or 'shoot', also being used in a metaphorical way "to denote growth, new beginnings, or a future hope", in the Hebrew Bible often symbolising the anticipated coming of the Messiah, a "sprout" from the line of David.

== History ==
Until 1948, the Arab village of Samakh was situated at this location. In 1920, the Zionist "Labor Brigade" (Hebrew: Gdud HaAvoda) paved the road from Tiberias to Tzemah. Until that date, Samakh's only direct connection to Tiberias had been by boat.

Currently, the Tzemach regional center is developing around the road junction.

== See also ==
- List of junctions and interchanges in Israel
