= Samakh =

Samakh can mean:

- Samakh, Tiberias, a depopulated former Palestinian village at the south end of the Sea of Galilee in Israel
- Samekh, a letter in the Hebrew and various other Semitic alphabets
