= Highway 87 (Golan Heights and Israel) =

Road in Israel

Coordinates: 32°55′11″N 35°40′32″E

Highway 87
- כביש 87
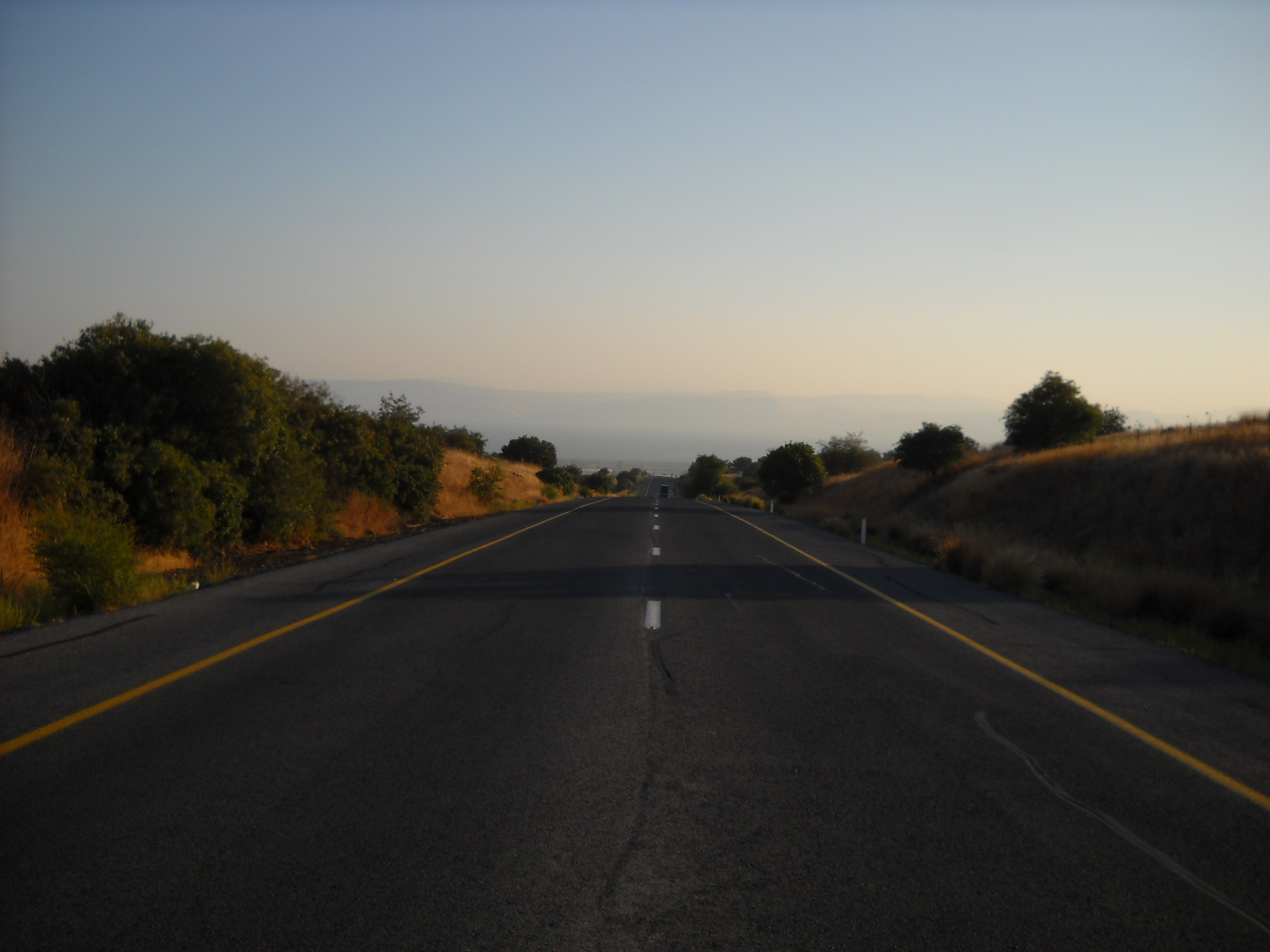
- Highway 87, looking westwards

Route information
- Length: 35 km (22 mi)

Major junctions
- West end: Kfar Nahum Junction
- East end: Pazra Junction

Location
- Country: Israel

Highway system
- Roads in Israel; Highways
← Highway 85	→ Highway 89

Highway 87 is a 35 km long east-west highway in northern Israel and the Israeli-occupied Golan Heights. It extends from the northern shores of Lake Kinneret through the central Golan Heights. It begins in the west at Kfar Nahum/Capernaum and ends in the east at Bashan Junction.

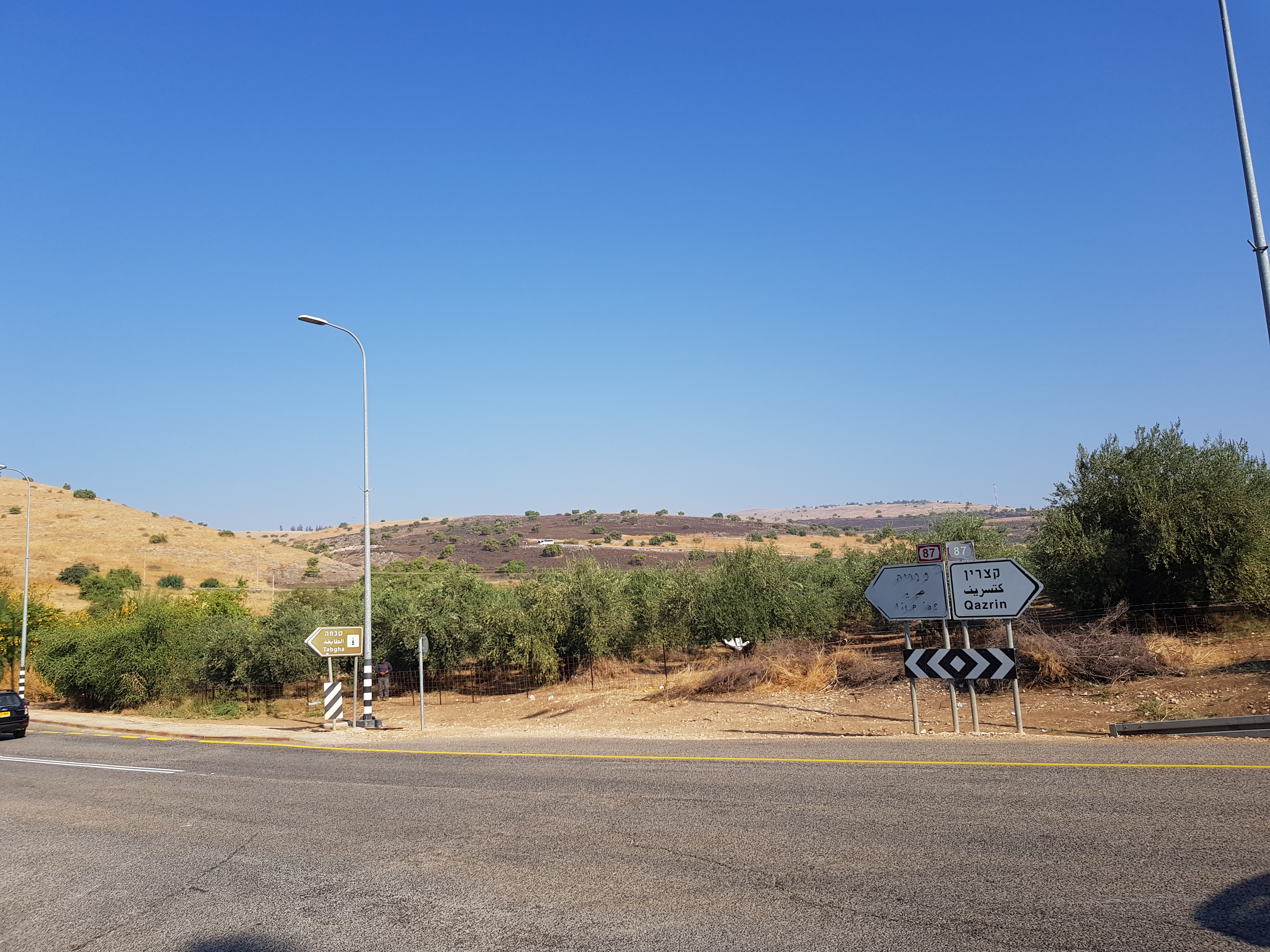
Highway 87 near its western end in Tabgha

== Junctions & Interchanges (West to East) ==
District	Location	km	mi	Name	Destinations	Notes
Northern	Kfar Nahum	0	0.0	צומת כפר נחום (Kfar Nahum Junction)	Highway 90	
Northern	Almagor	6	3.7	צומת אלמגור (Almagor Junction)	Road 8277	
Northern	Bethsaida	10	6.2	צומת בית צידה (Bethsaida Junction)	Route 888	
Northern	Bethsaida Valley	12	7.5	צומת יהודיה (Yehudiya Junction)	Highway 92	
Northern	Katzrin	24	15	צומת קצרין דרום (South Katzrin Junction)	Road 9088	
Northern	Golan Heights	27	17	צומת המפלים (Waterfalls Junction)	Route 808	
Northern	Keshet	30	19	צומת קשת (Keshet Junction)	Petroleum Road	
Northern	Givat Pazra	35	22	צומת פזרה (Pazra Junction)	Highway 98	
1.000 mi = 1.609 km; 1.000 km = 0.621 mi

== Places of interest near Highway 87 ==
- Tabgha/Ein Sheva with the Church of the Multiplication and the Church of the Primacy of St. Peter
- Church of the Beatitudes
- Capernaum/Kfar Nahum – the Franciscan side of the archaeological site with the ancient synagogue, and the Greek Orthodox side and monastery
- Arik Bridge
- Bethsaida, Bethsaida Valley and nature reserve
- Yehudiya Forest Nature Reserve and Yehudiya Stream
- Memorial statue for the IDF's 7th brigade
- Husayniyah (חושנייה)

== See also ==
- List of highways in Israel
