= Tze'elim Stream =

Stream and canyon in Israel

Coordinates: 31°20′16.22″N 35°15′58.9″E

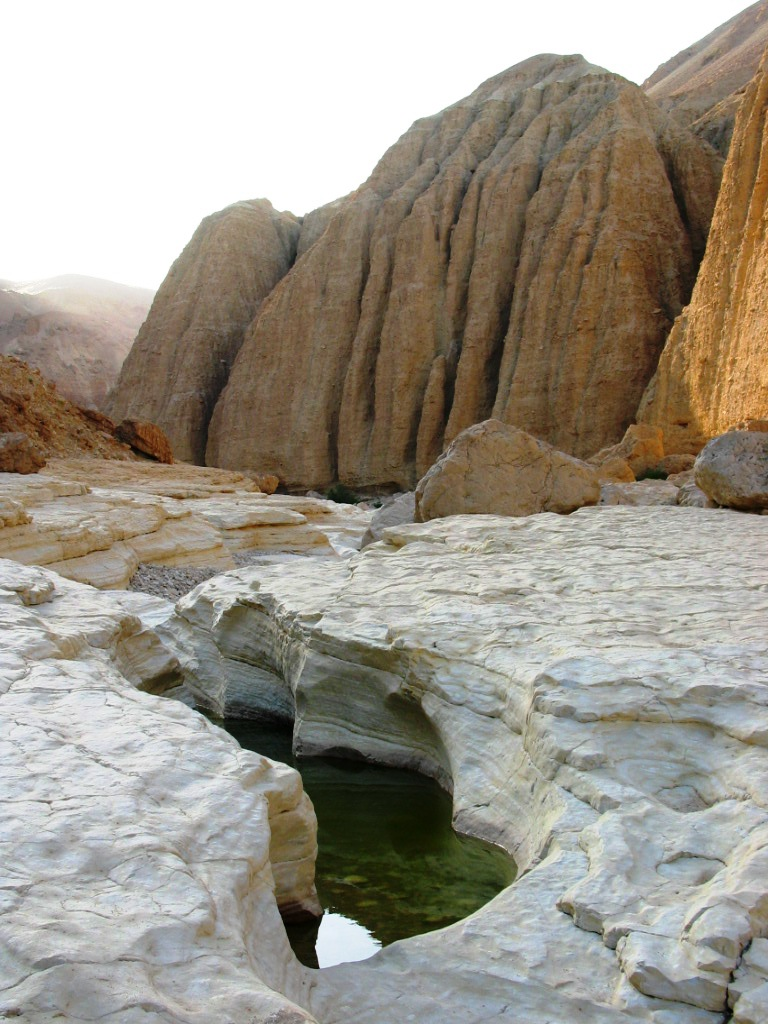

The Tze'elim Stream (Hebrew: נחל צאלים, Nahal Tze'elim, also Nahal Se'elim) is a wadi and canyon situated in the Judean Desert, Israel, near Masada, descending towards the Dead Sea. It receives the waters of its tributary, Nahal Harduf, before reaching and flowing into the Dead Sea. Ein Namer, which means "Leopard Spring", is a spring located in the middle of the canyon, providing water during the year to local flora and fauna.

The stream passes through the territory of the city of Arad.

== See also ==
- List of rivers of Israel
