= Bazelet River =

Coordinates: 32°55′23.6″N 35°48′29.8″E

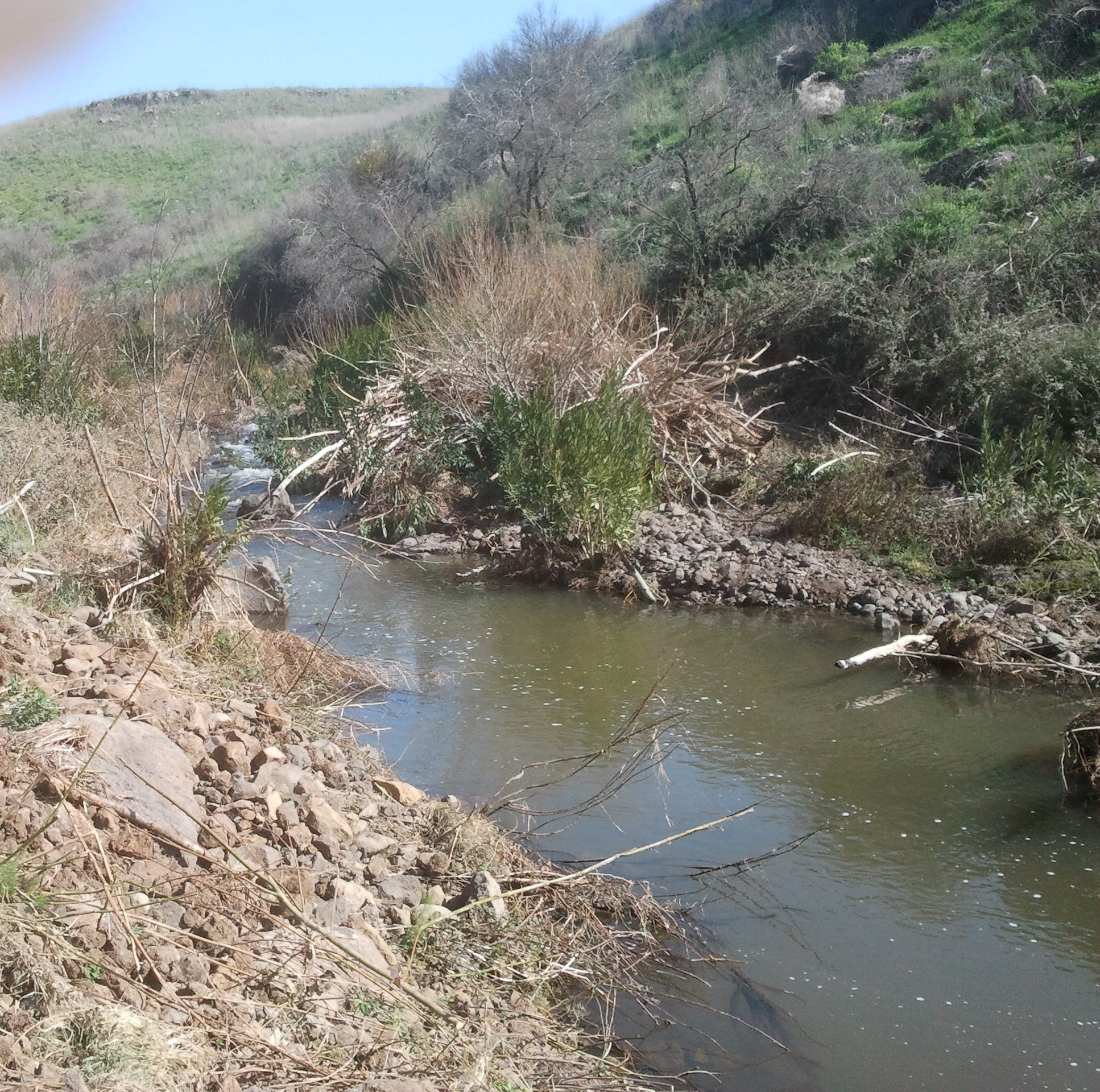
The Bazelet River

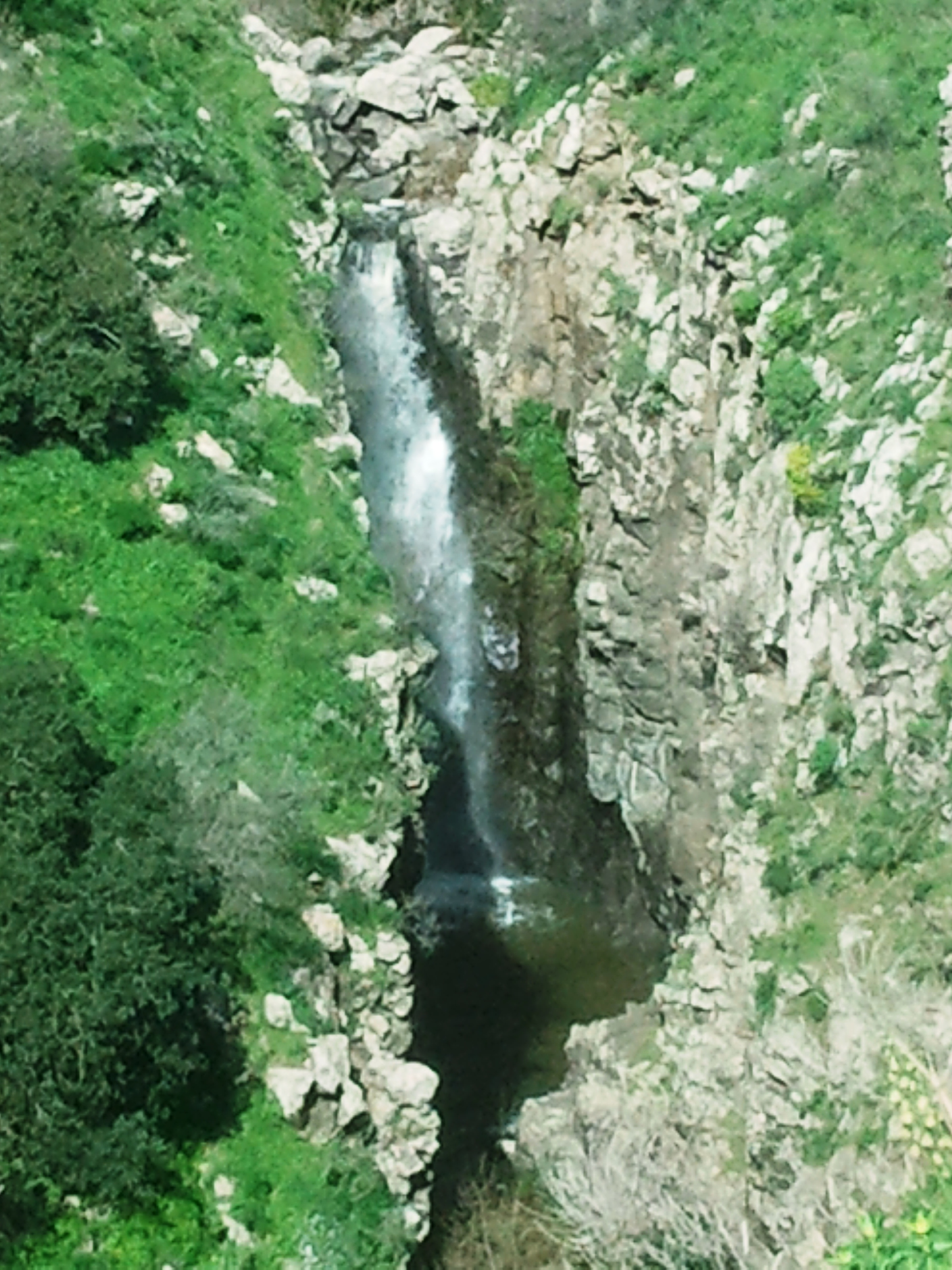
Bazelet Waterfall, Gamla Reserve.

The Bazelet River is a river in the Golan Heights. It flows through the Gamla Nature Reserve. The Bazelet Waterfall is a major feature of the river. A section of the stream west of Road 808 is located in the area of the Yehudiya Forest Reserve.
