= Ramot (Israeli settlement) =

Israeli settlement in the Golan Heights

Ramot: רָמוֹת (Hebrew)
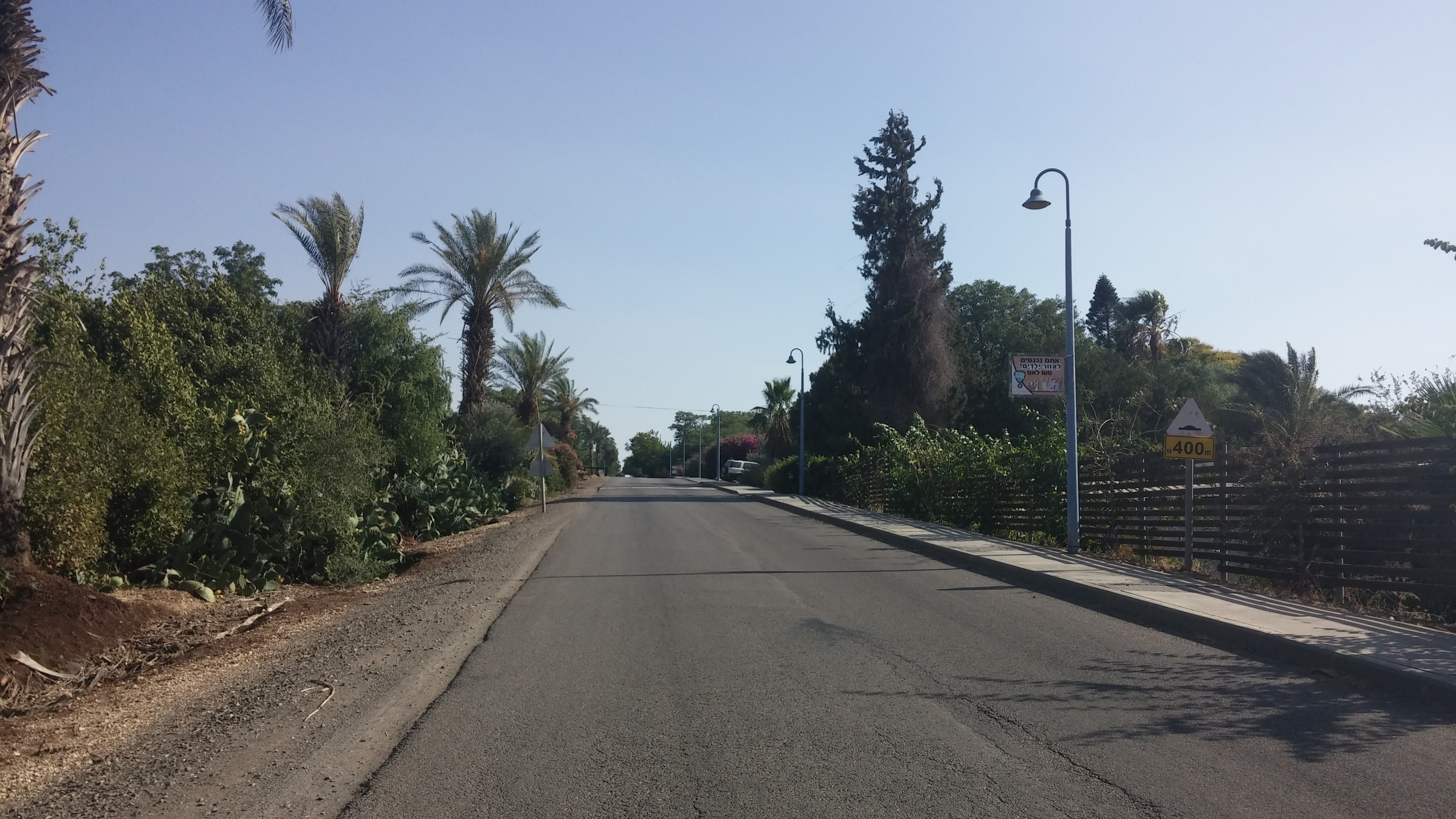
- Entrance road to Moshav Ramot
- Etymology: Heights
- Location within the Golan Heights Location within the Golan Heights
- Coordinates: 32°50′58″N 35°40′03″E
- Country: Golan Heights (Internationally recognized as Syrian territory occupied by Israel.)
- District: Northern
- Subdistrict: Golan
- Council: Golan Regional Council
- Region: Golan Heights
- Affiliation: Moshavim Movement
- Founded: 1969
- Population (2024): 872

Ramot (Hebrew: רָמוֹת, lit. "Heights") is an Israeli settlement organized as a moshav, near the eastern shores of the Sea of Galilee in the western Golan Heights. Named "Ramot" because it is located on two hills, it falls under the jurisdiction of Golan Regional Council. In 2024 it had a population of 872.

The international community considers Israeli settlements in the Golan Heights illegal under international law, but the Israeli government disputes this.

== Geography ==
The community is located on a small hill, which is the lowest step on the slope that falls from the Golan Heights to the Sea of Galilee, about 10 meters (33 ft) below sea level (compared to the Sea of Galilee which is about 210 meters (690 ft) below sea level). The community is 2 kilometers (1.2 mi) east of the Sea of Galilee and 7 kilometers (4.3 mi) north of Ein Gev.

== History ==
The moshav was founded in 1969, when Golan area was a part of the Israeli Military Governorate. In 1981, the area of Golan was unilaterally annexed by Israel, applying Israeli civil rule on the area. The founders first lived in the houses of the abandoned village of Skoufiya, and then settled two years later to temporary "triangle houses" in what is now the Ramot recreation village. In 1973, they resettled in the moshav's current location. The moshav is a member of the Moshavim Movement.

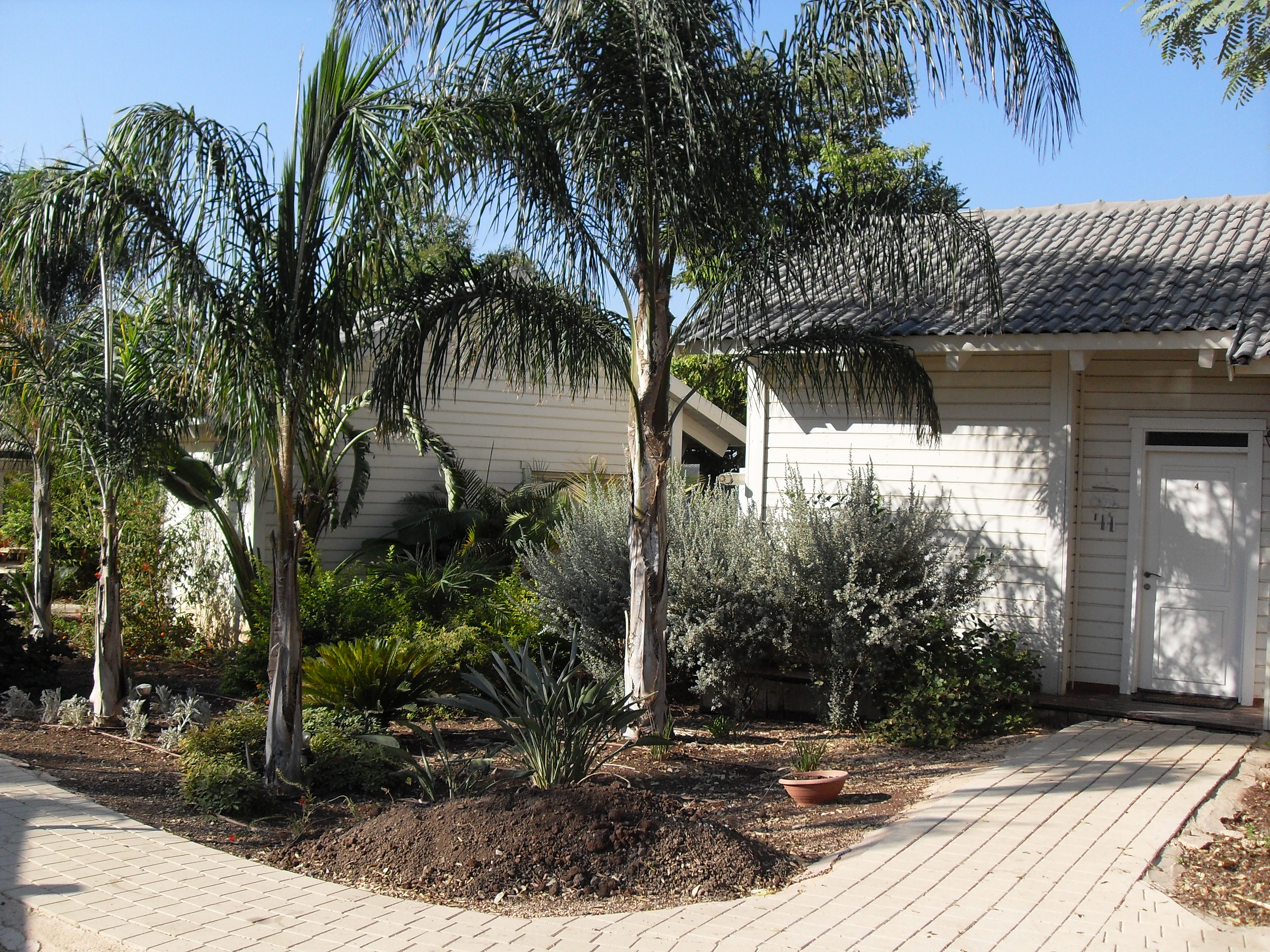
Guest houses

== Population ==
In 2012, the moshav had 478 inhabitants, and in 2024, 872..

== Economy ==
The economy of the community is based on irrigated agriculture (bananas, mangos, lychee, palm trees, guava and avocado, and flowers), poultry production, raising cattle for meat and milk, and raising sheep.

== Transportation ==
The Golan Regional Council operates 24 buses per day from Ramot to the Israeli city of Tiberias. The bus ride to Tiberias takes approximately 39 minutes. Ramot is also located close to Highway 92, the primary road along the east side of the Sea of Galilee.

=== Tourism ===
Ramot is a popular vacation destination. Among the moshav's tourist facilities are a resort hotel, guest houses, and a horse ranch.

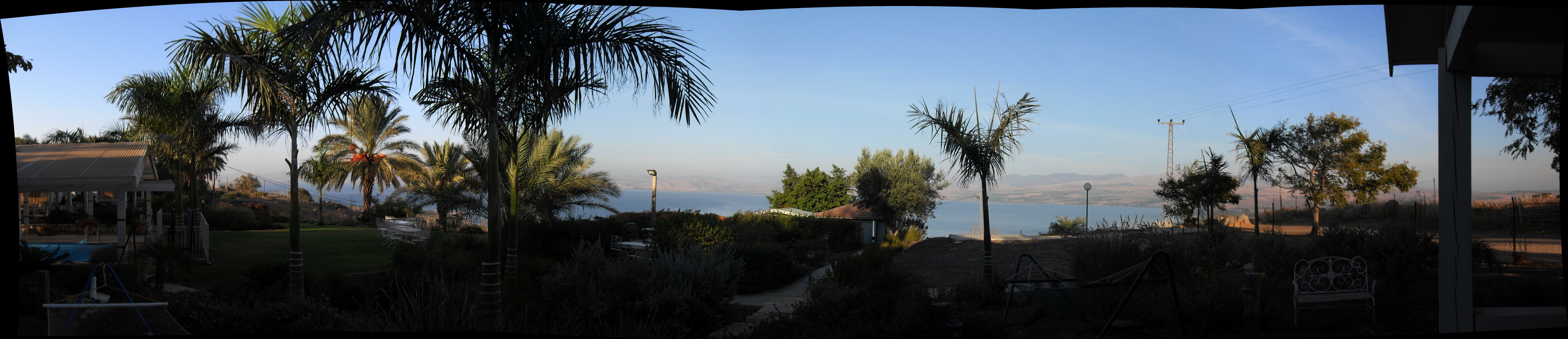
A panoramic view of the Sea of Galilee at sunrise from Ramot
