= Mahanayim Stream =

Coordinates: 33°01′41″N 35°37′50″E

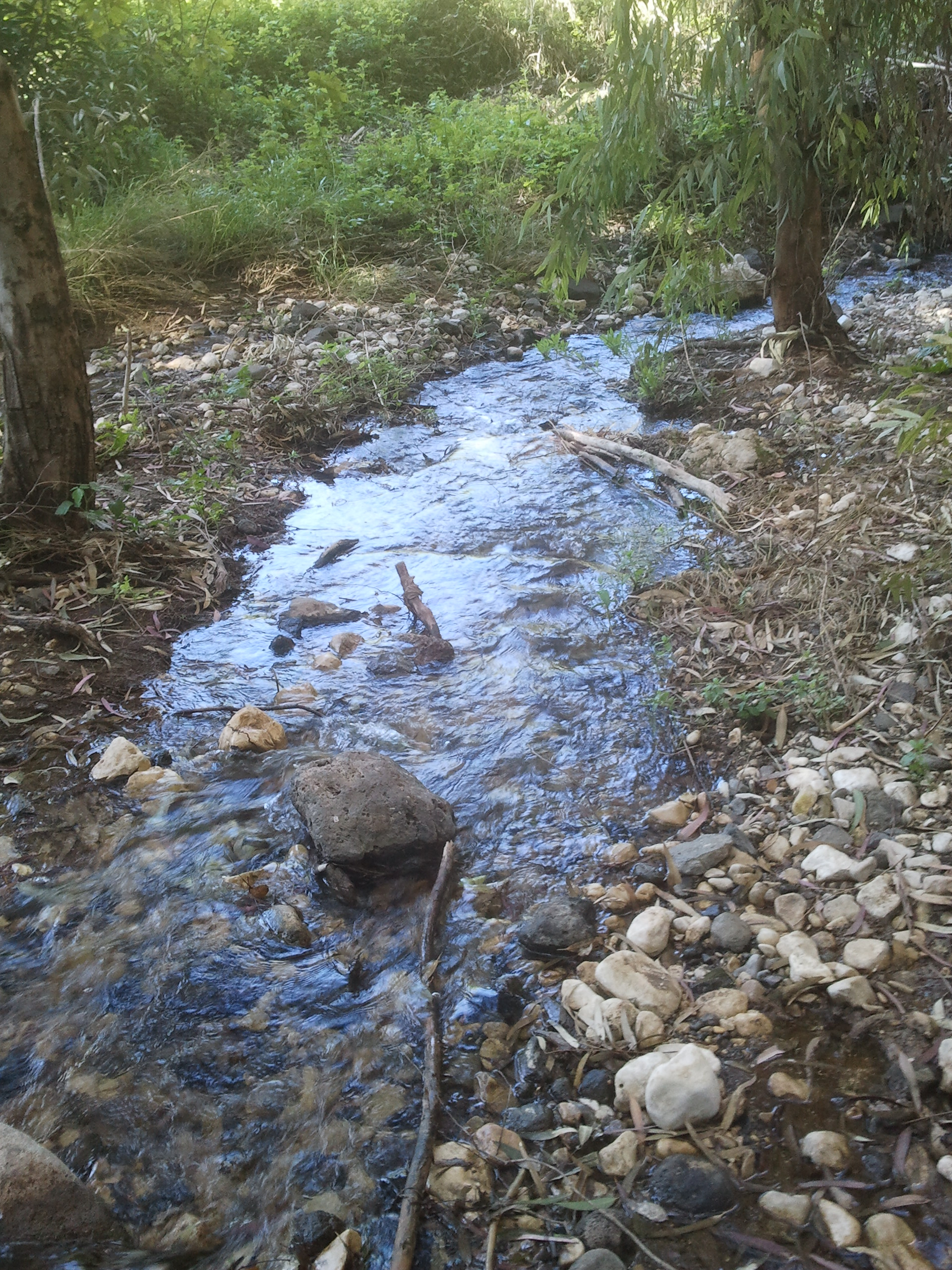

Location
- State: Israel
- Region: Upper Galilee

Mahanayim Stream (Hebrew: נחל מחניים, romanised Nahal Mahanayim, lit. 'Stream of the Two Camps') is a stream named after Kibbutz Mahanayim, located in the eastern Upper Galilee of Israel.

== Geography ==
The stream begins at an elevation of approximately 900 meters above sea level near the community settlement of Amuka, on the eastern slopes of Mount Yavnit. From there, it flows in a steep descent towards the southeast to Hatzor HaGlilit, crossing the settlement from west to east. At this point, the stream turns northeast, reaching the Korazim Plateau, passing north of Kibbutz Maḥanayim, Moshav Mishmar HaYarden, and Kibbutz Gadot, and empties into the Jordan River in an artificial channel diverted for drainage and agricultural purposes.

The stream forms the northern boundary of the Korazim Plateau. It is 13 kilometers long, and its drainage basin covers an area of 21 square kilometers.

== Hydrology ==
Several small springs emerge along the stream, enabling a continuous flow of water in parts of the stream, making these sections perennial. Near the ruins of Yardah, the "Ein Yardah" spring emerges, with a flow of up to 5 cubic meters per hour. These waters were previously utilized for agriculture and are now released into the stream.

=== Springs ===
In the section of the stream between Amuka and Hatzor HaGlilit, the springs Ein Honi, named after Honi HaMe'agel, and Ein Marganit, a seasonal spring, flow. This section of the stream is well known for the blooming of the large Sternbergia. Near Hatzor HaGlilit, a tomb attributed to Honi HaMa'agel is located.

=== Recreational activities ===
In the section of the stream northeast of Kibbutz Maḥanayim, the Upper Galilee Regional Council has established a bicycle trail that runs parallel to the stream.

== Archaeological significance ==
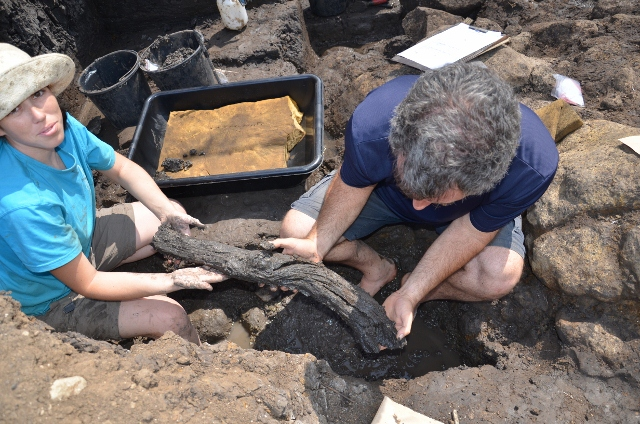
Prehistoric tree branch, Prehistoric wood, Nahal Mahanayim Outlet (NMO) excavation

At the confluence of the Maḥanayim Stream with the Jordan River, north of the Bnot Ya'akov Bridge, is a prehistoric archaeological site associated with the Middle Paleolithic period (Mousterian culture). The site has been radiometrically dated to approximately 65,000 years ago. The site contains remains of aurochs bones and flint tools used for butchering animals after hunting. Discovered in 1999, the site was excavated by Gonen Sharon on behalf of the Hebrew University and Tel-Hai College.

== See also ==
- List of rivers of Israel
