= Hexagon Pool =

Lake in Golan Heights

Coordinates: 32°56′19″N 35°39′56″E

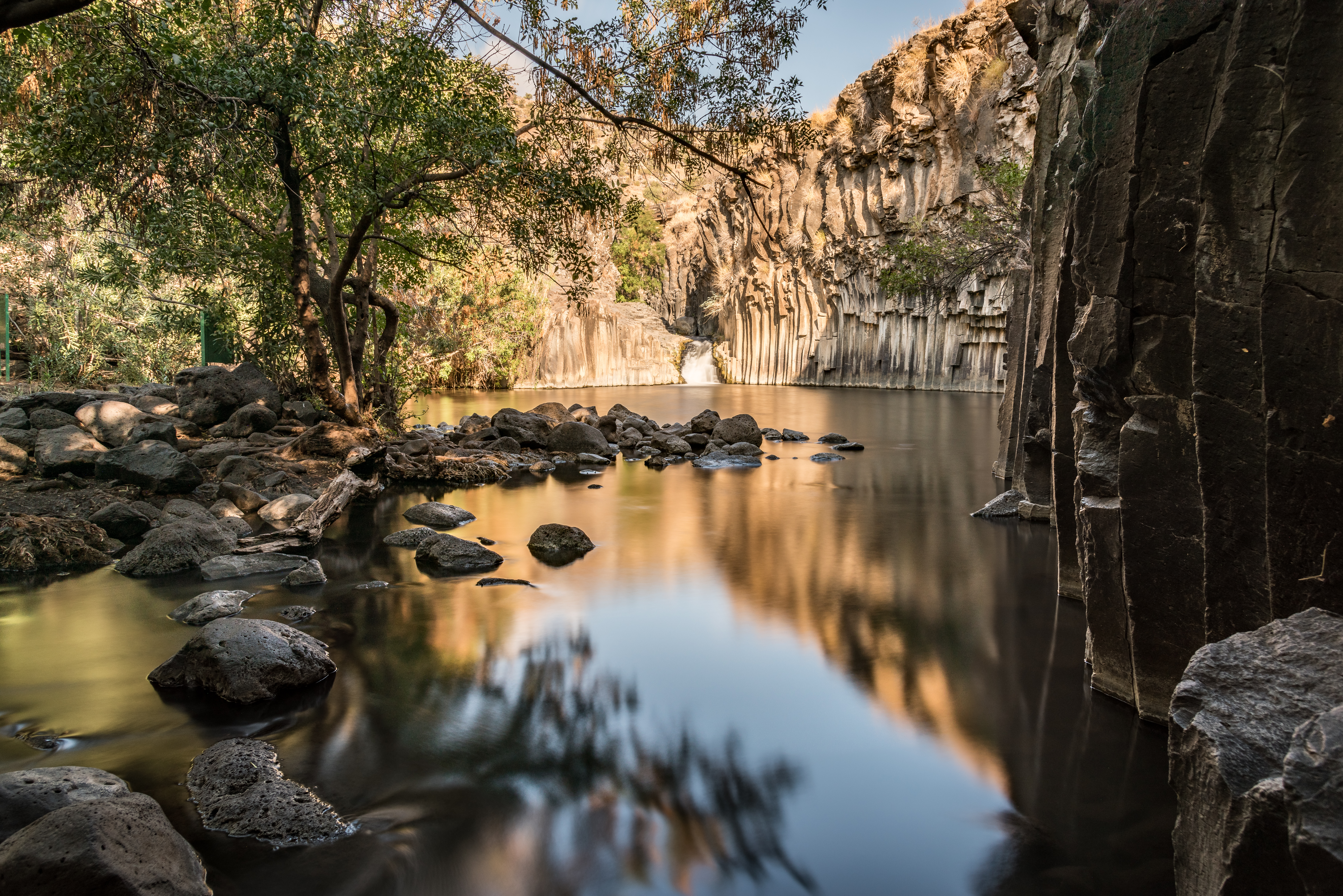
Hexagon Pool

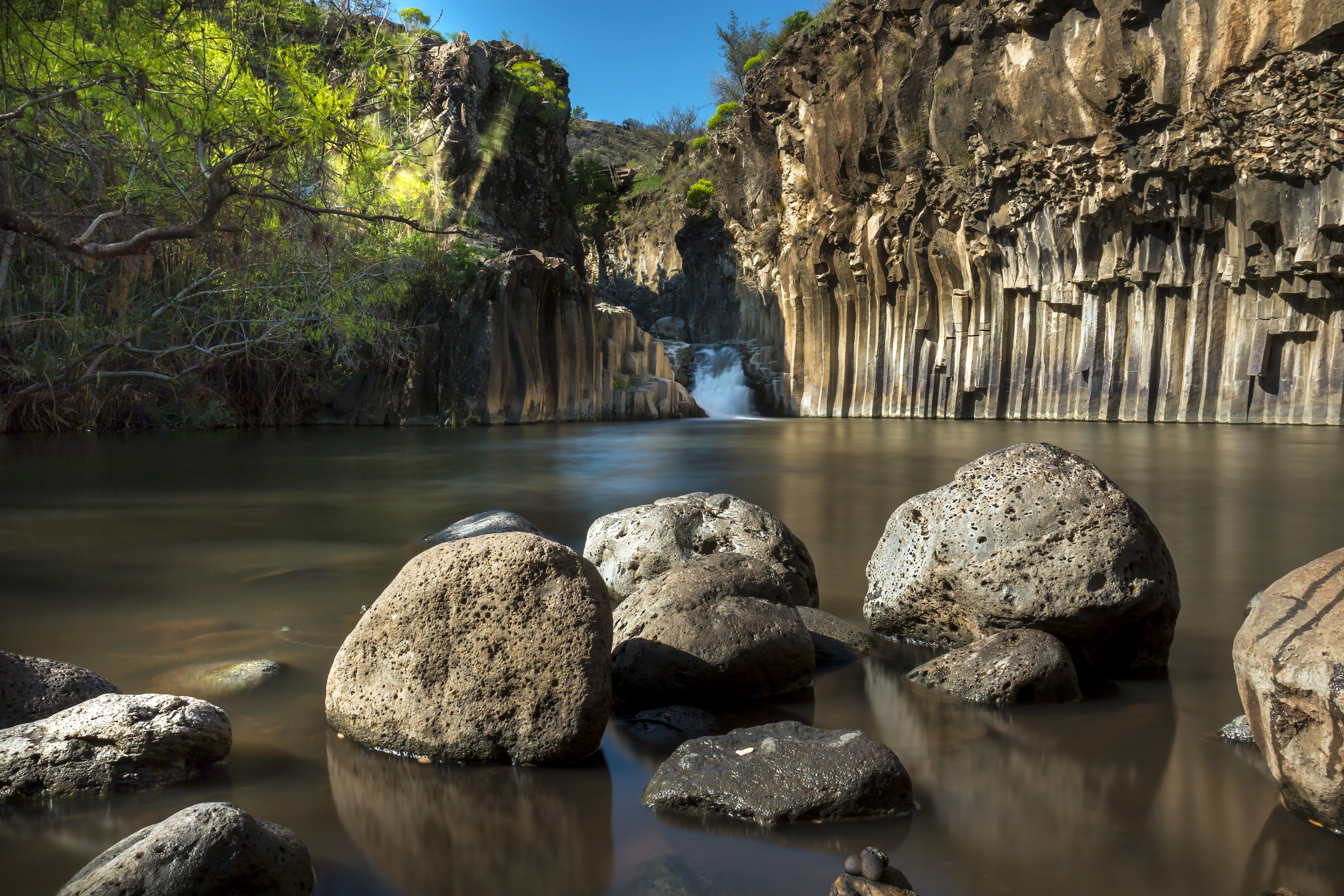
Hexagon Pool

The Hexagon Pool (Hebrew: בריכת המשושים, Breichat HaMeshushim) is a natural pool by the Meshushim River in the Yehudiya Forest Nature Reserve, the central Golan Heights.

The pool, at the bottom of a canyon, is named after the shape of the hexagonal basalt columns that make up its walls. This geological formation was created by the slow cooling of layers of lava flows over a long period. When the lava solidified and cooled, it was split into polygonal shapes due to its contraction.

== Hydrology and Flora ==
The Meshushim Stream flows for approximately 20 kilometers from the northern Golan Heights down to the Kinneret (Sea of Galilee). While it is fed by natural springs and central tributaries like the Zavitan and Katzrin streams in its lower sections, its natural flow is significantly affected by the massive water management and collection systems in the Golan Heights, which include artificial reservoirs built near its headwaters. While historical deforestation, particularly during the Ottoman era, depleted much of the region's woodlands, the surrounding Yehudiya Forest Nature Reserve is undergoing gradual ecological recovery. The plant life enveloping the canyon and trail features scattered Mediterranean flora, predominantly Mount Tabor oak (Quercus ithaburensis), alongside officinal storax, Atlantic pistachio, Syrian ash, and Christ's thorn jujube. Near the water's edge, riparian vegetation such as oleander (Nerium oleander) and willows exist.The steep eastern cliffs of the canyon provide nesting sites for various birds.

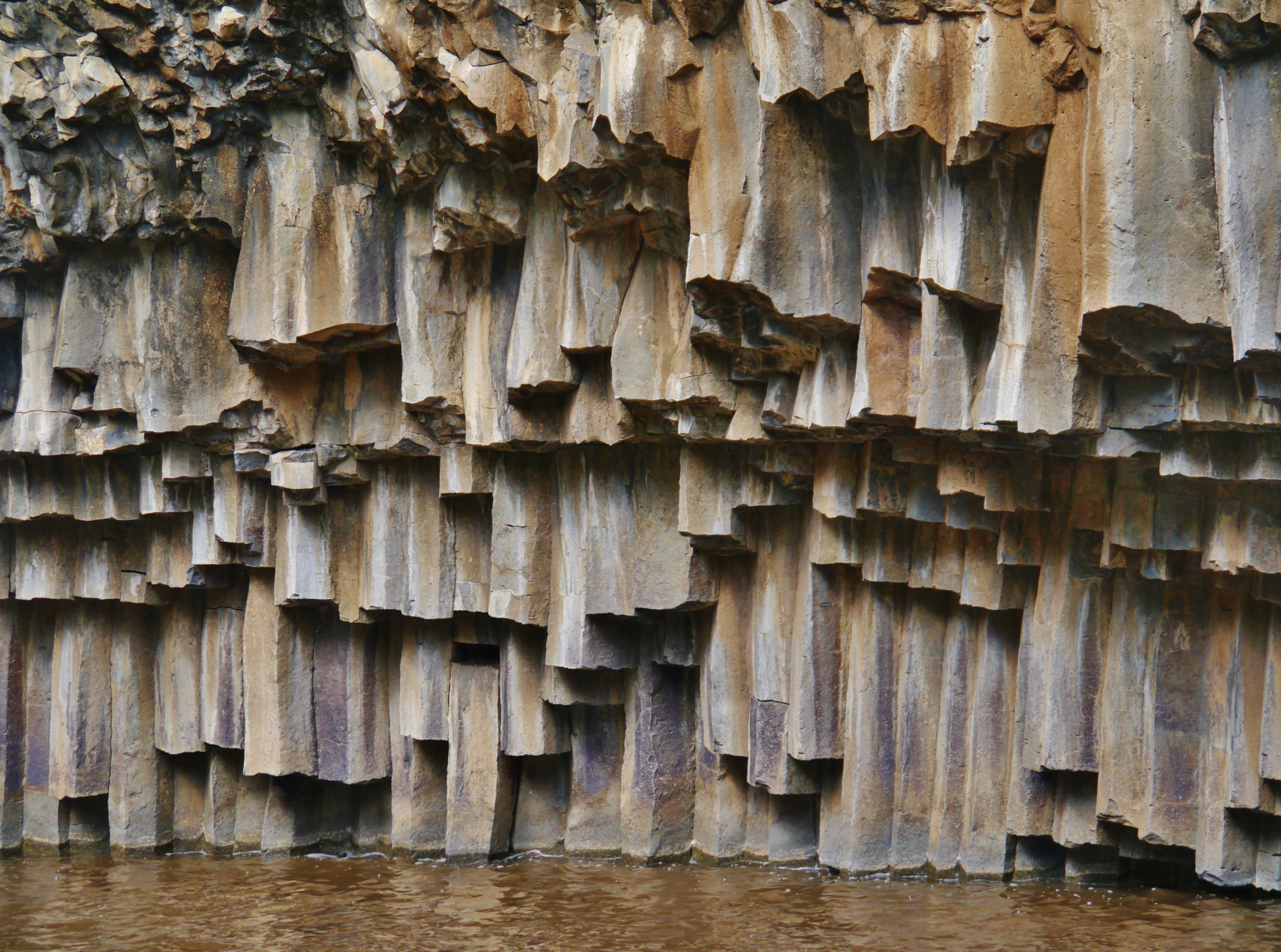
Detail of the walls

== Geology ==
A cascade of water, such as a waterfall, created the pool. The walls are columns of basalt in angular formations that appear man-made. The columns reach a height of approximately 5 metres (16 ft), and most have five or six sides. The diameter of each column is between 30 and 40 centimetres (1.0 and 1.3 ft). Walls of basalt columns exist in other places in the Golan Heights, along the Meshushim and Zavitan Rivers.

The crystalline structure of the Hexagon Pool's walls is an example of columnar jointing, a geological process where thick basaltic lava flows contract symmetrically as they cool down. While the majority of the columns exhibit five or six sides, four-sided and seven-sided polygonal formations can also be observed within the canyon walls. The pool itself reaches a maximum depth of approximately 6 to 7 meters.

== Regulations and Swimming ==
Being an un-monitored body of water, there are no active lifeguards on duty, and swimming is permitted strictly for experienced swimmers. To preserve the natural ecosystem and protect visitors from potential hazards, the Israel Nature and Parks Authority enforces strict regulations at the site, which include a ban on eating near the water's edge, diving into the pool, and a partial closure of the shaded sections of the water due to rockfall risks.

== Trails and Hiking ==
The easiest access to the reserve is located 2.5 kilometres (1.6 miles) north of the community settlement of Had Nes on Route 888 where a junction leads to the Nature Reserve's main entrance. Access to the pool is normally allowed year-round, though the water temperature rarely exceeds 18 °C (64 °F), even in summer.

The canyon and the Hexagon Pool offer multiple trail variations categorized by length and difficulty. The short, standard route requires a 30-minute downhill walk, descending approximately 130 meters into the canyon floor along a steep incline that features around 400 stone steps. For a more extensive hike, the circular "Stream Trail" (Hebrew: שביל הנחל, Shvil HaNahal) adds several hundred meters to the trek; it routes visitors through an old olive grove dating back to the Syrian administration era and involves a minor technical descent and climb utilizing installed rungs and footholds to cross the riverbeds via footbridges.

Additionally, a longer 6 to 7 hour linear route connects the lower section of the nearby Zavitan Stream directly to the Hexagon Pool, starting from the Yehudia parking lot and necessitating a two-vehicle setup to coordinate between the distinct entry and exit trailheads. Another advanced option extends the hike by 5.6 kilometers, continuing past the pool along an unshaded dirt track used historically by the Syrian military before terminating at Route 87 near the Beit Zaida intersection.

== See also ==
- List of places with columnar basalt
