= Yehudiya Forest Nature Reserve =

Nature reserve in the Golan Heights

Coordinates: 32.93919°N 35.69868°E

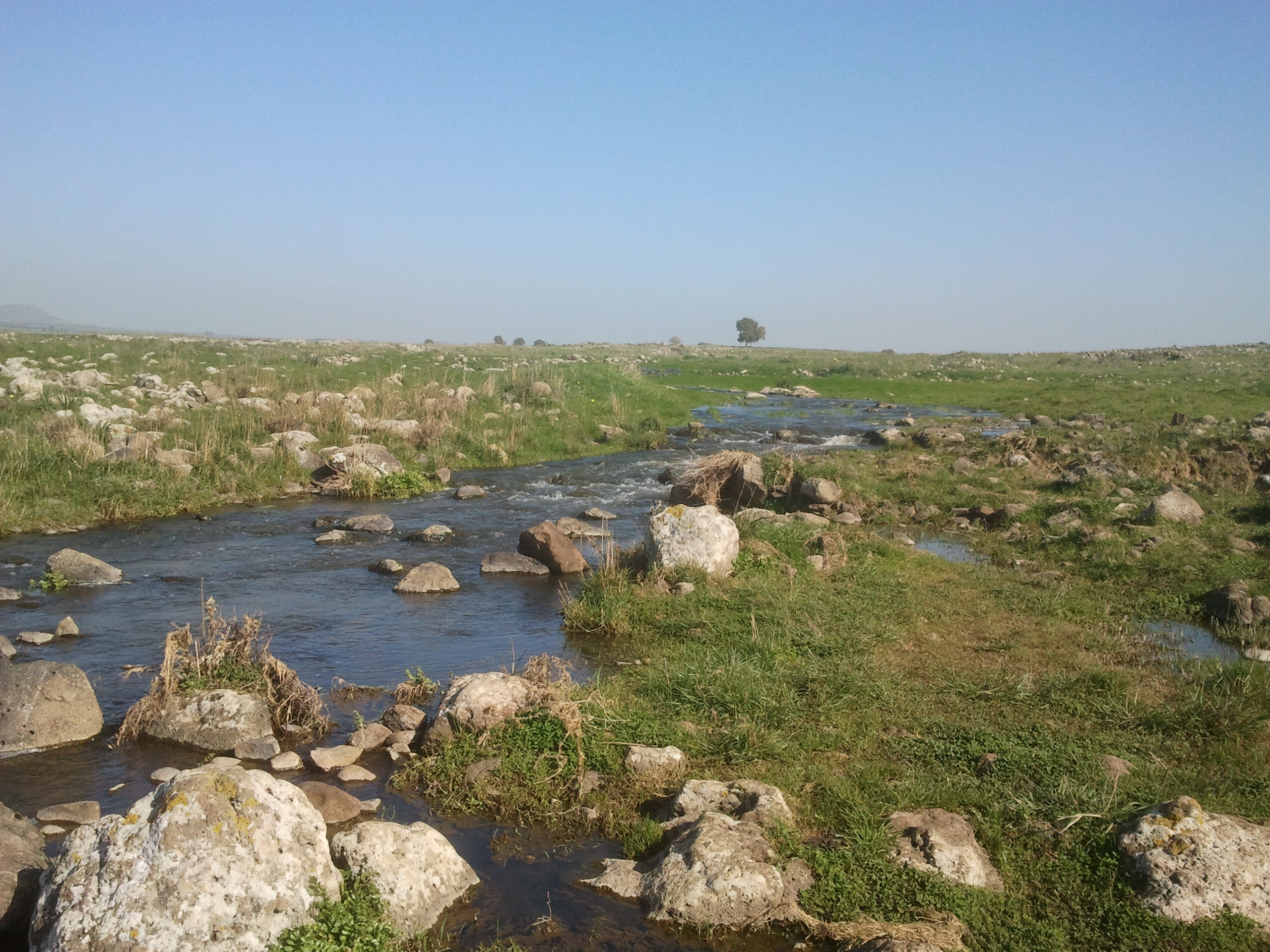
Bazelet River within the reserve

The Yehudiya Reserve (Hebrew: שמורת יהודיה) is a nature reserve in the central Golan Heights. With the area of 134 sq. km, it is the largest reserve in the Golans. The height differential of its landscape - from 200 meters below the sea level to 600 meters above - provides for high waterfalls. It is named after the ancient village of Yehudiya, one of many archaeological sites located within the reserve. Due to the varied scenery of streams, gorges with waterfalls, woodlands, rich wildlife, and volcanic basalt landscape it is a popular tourist destination in Israel.

It is located between Katsrin in the north east and Bethsaida (north of the Sea of Galilee) in the south west, and between Road 888 in the west (Bethsaida junction – Customs House Junction) and the borders of the Gamla nature reserve and Road 869 in the south. Road 87 from Yehudiya Junction to Katsrin South Junction crosses it.

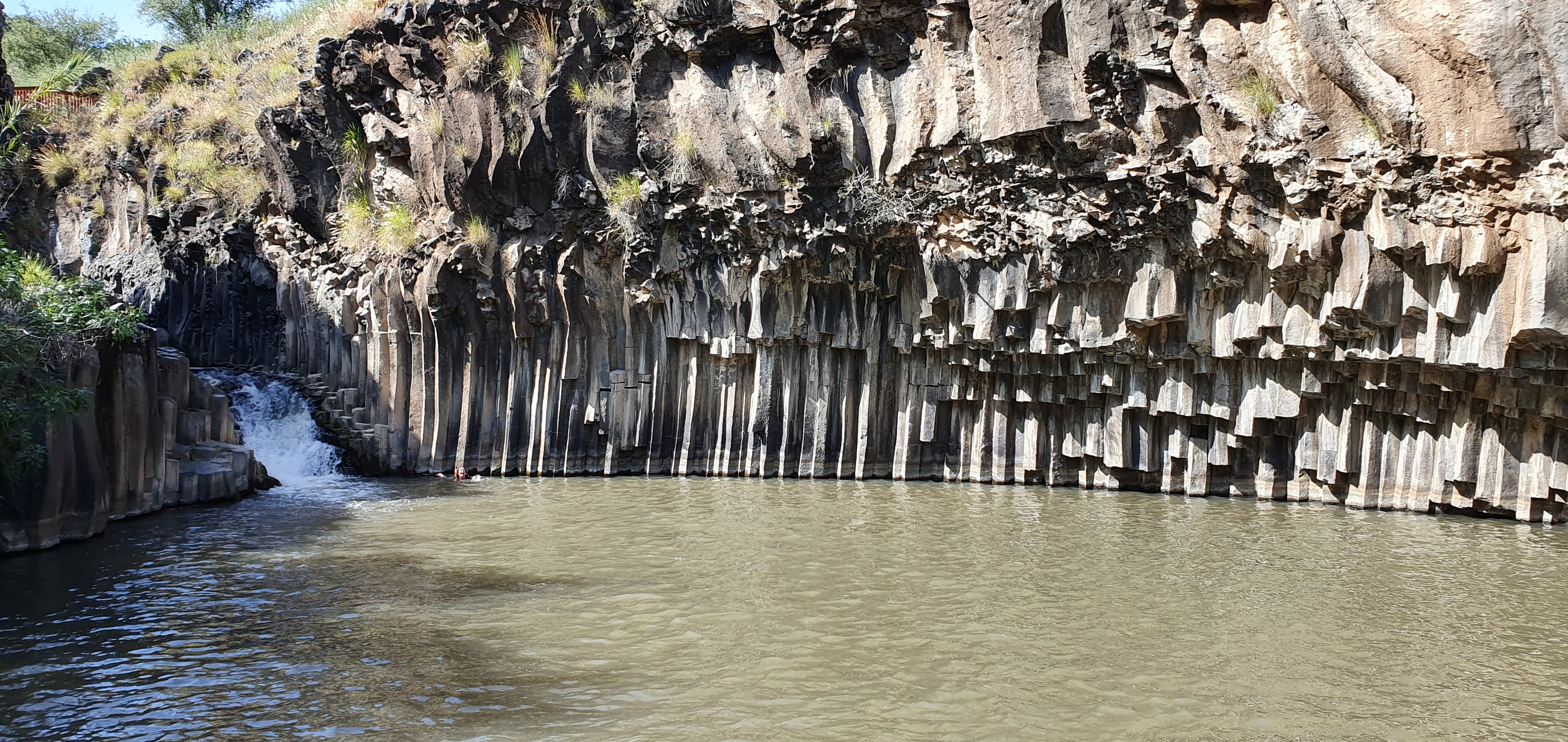
Hexagons Pool

Most of the area are covered by basalt strata. In many places there are hexagonal basalt columns. The most impressive display of them is in the Hexagon Pool on the Meshushim Stream (Nahal Meshushim, "Hexagons Stream"), although notable hexagonal formations exist by the Zavitan Stream (Nahal Zavitan) and the Ayit Waterfall.

A part of the reserve (south of Yehudiya River towards the Daliyot River) is a training area for the Israel Defense Forces, which sometimes causes fires.

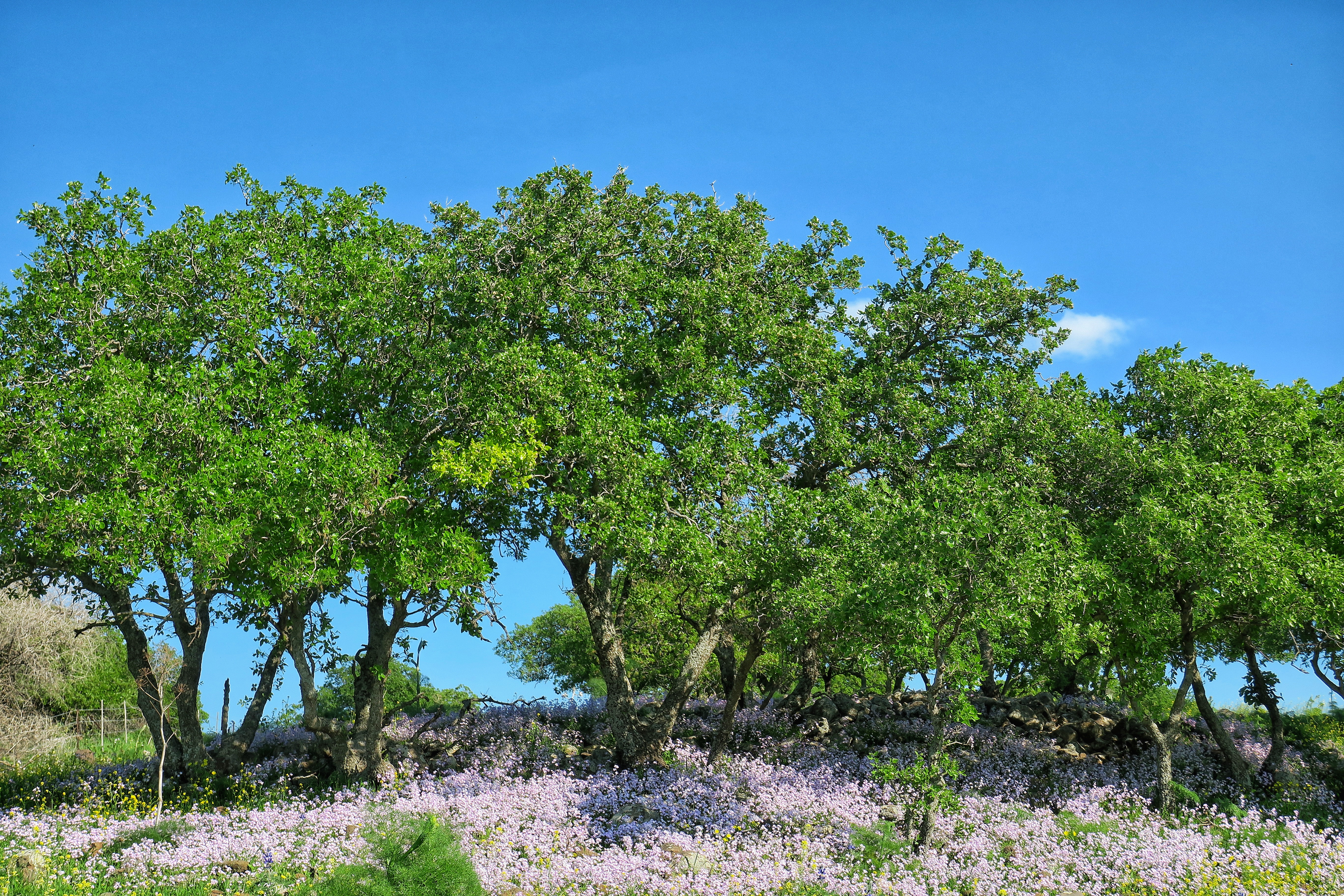
A tree grove in the woodland

The Yehudiya forest area covers 66 square kilometers. It is rather sparse and trees cover about 10% of the woodland, and the rest is savanna-like landscape. The most prevalent tree is Quercus ithaburensis (Mount Tabor Oak).

The reserve is abundant in water sources. Most important rivers (streams) are Meshushim, Zavitan, Yehudiya, Gamla, and Daliyot.

In June 2024, Hezbollah launched a series of rocket and drone attacks on the Golan Heights, resulting in the destruction of 10,000 dunams of open areas by fire. The fire damaged parts of the Yehudiya Forest Nature Reserve, including hiking trails and the reserve's Black Canyon. According to an official from the Nature and Parks Authority, it will take years for the local flora to recover.

In October 2025, archaeologists from the Zinman Institute of Archaeology at the University of Haifa and the Department of Land of Israel Studies at Kinneret College unearthed a 1,500-year-old synagogue in the park.
