= Ma'ale Gamla =

Israeli settlement in the Golan Heights

Ma'ale Gamla: מַעֲלֵה גַּמְלָא (Hebrew)
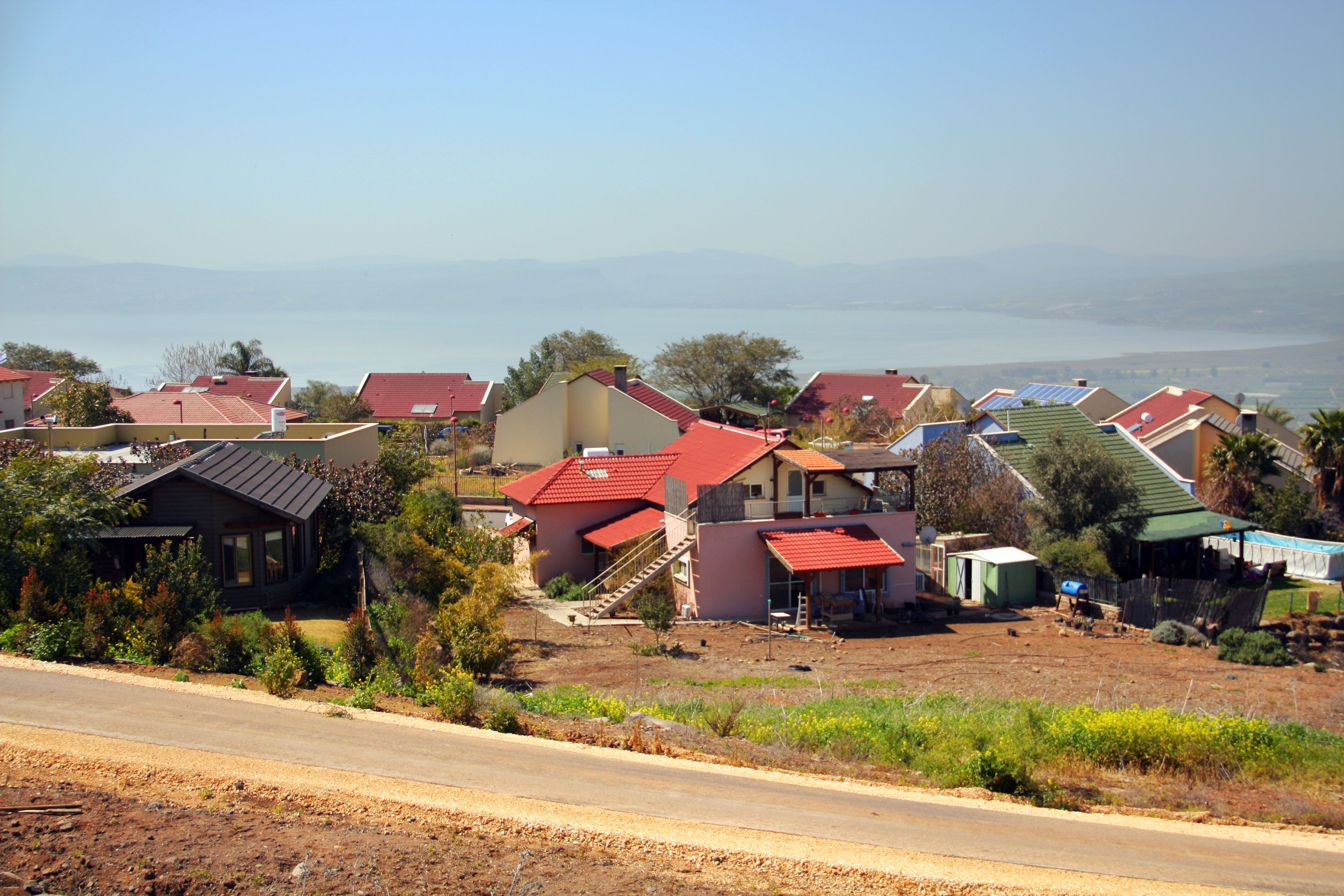

- Location within the Golan Heights Location within the Golan Heights
- Coordinates: 32°53′17″N 35°41′7″E
- Country: Golan Heights (Internationally recognized as Syrian territory occupied by Israel.)
- District: Northern
- Subdistrict: Golan
- Council: Golan
- Affiliation: Moshavim Movement
- Founded: 1975
- Population (2024): 734
- Website: www.mgamla.org.il

Ma'ale Gamla (Hebrew: מַעֲלֵה גַּמְלָא) is an Israeli settlement and moshav located in the west part of the Golan Heights, under the occupation of Israel. It falls under the municipal jurisdiction of Golan Regional Council. In 2024 it had a population of 734.

The international community considers Israeli settlements in the Golan Heights illegal under international law, but the United States and the Israeli government dispute this.

== Notable residents ==
- Shlomi Binder

== History ==
The moshav was built in 1975 and was named after the ancient town of Gamla, destroyed in the course of the Jewish–Roman war in the 1st century CE, and believed to be the ruin of Tell es Salam, 6 km (3.7 mi) to the west.

== See also ==
- Israeli-occupied territories
