= Daliyot River =

Coordinates: 32°54′0.4″N 35°42′44.3″E

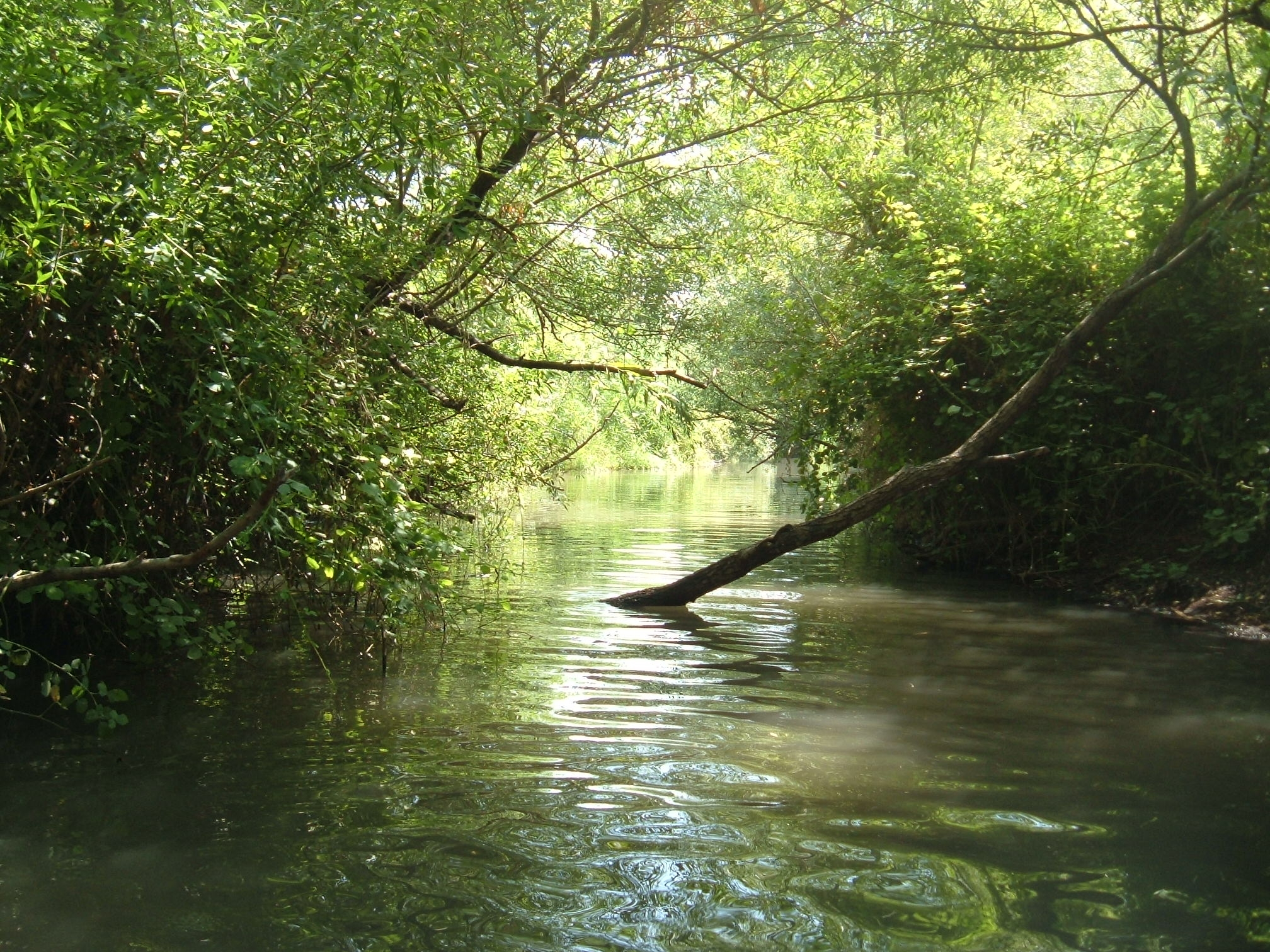
Daliyot River.

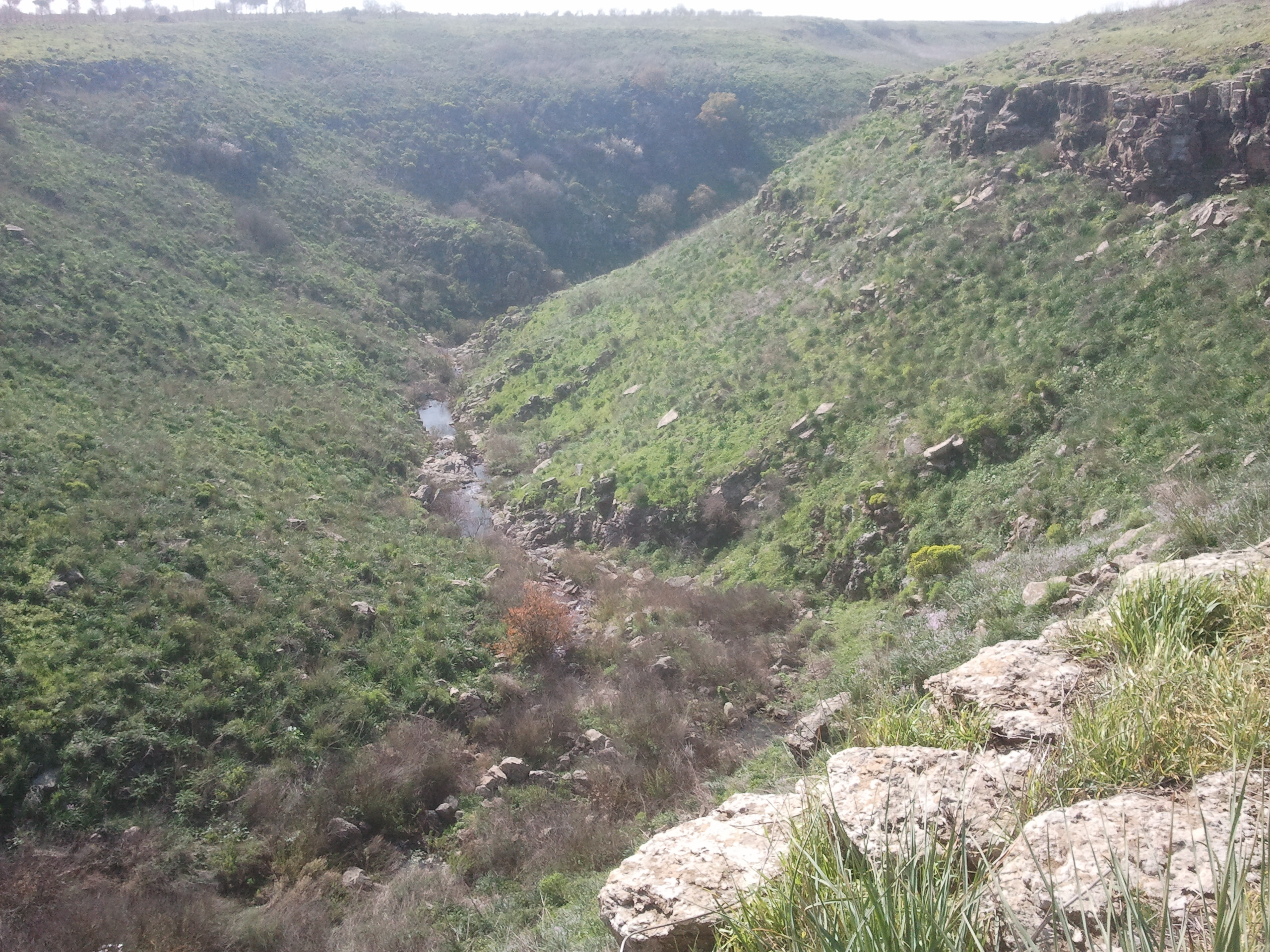
Daliyot River

The Daliyot River (Hebrew: Nahal Daliyot) is a river in the Golan Heights. It flows from the Golan Heights plateau, through the Gamla Nature Reserve and down the western slopes of the Heights, and into the Sea of Galilee.

== The estuary, Majrase ==
The Jordan River and the streams coming down from the Central Golan create a landscape of swamps and open water surfaces, variously called deltas, estuaries or lagoons.

The Daliyot River is one of five rivers running through the Bethsaida Valley (Batikha or Buteikha in Arabic): the Jordan at the northern edge, Meshushim (Wadi el-Hawa in Arabic; collects the waters of the Katzrin Stream and Zavitan Stream), Yehudiya (with Batra as a tributary), Daliyot - together they form the Meshushim and Zaki Lagoons before reaching the Sea of Galilee -, and Sfamnun.

The Daliyot River estuary, best known as Majrassa or Majrase, is the largest freshwater nature reserve controlled by Israel. It carries water from the Golan Heights and forms lagoons when it reaches the Sea of Galilee.

The Majrase Nature Reserve stretches over 5000 dunams, some of it agricultural land.

== See also ==
- National parks and nature reserves of Israel
