= Ma'agan =

Ma'agan: מעגן (Hebrew)
- Kibbutz
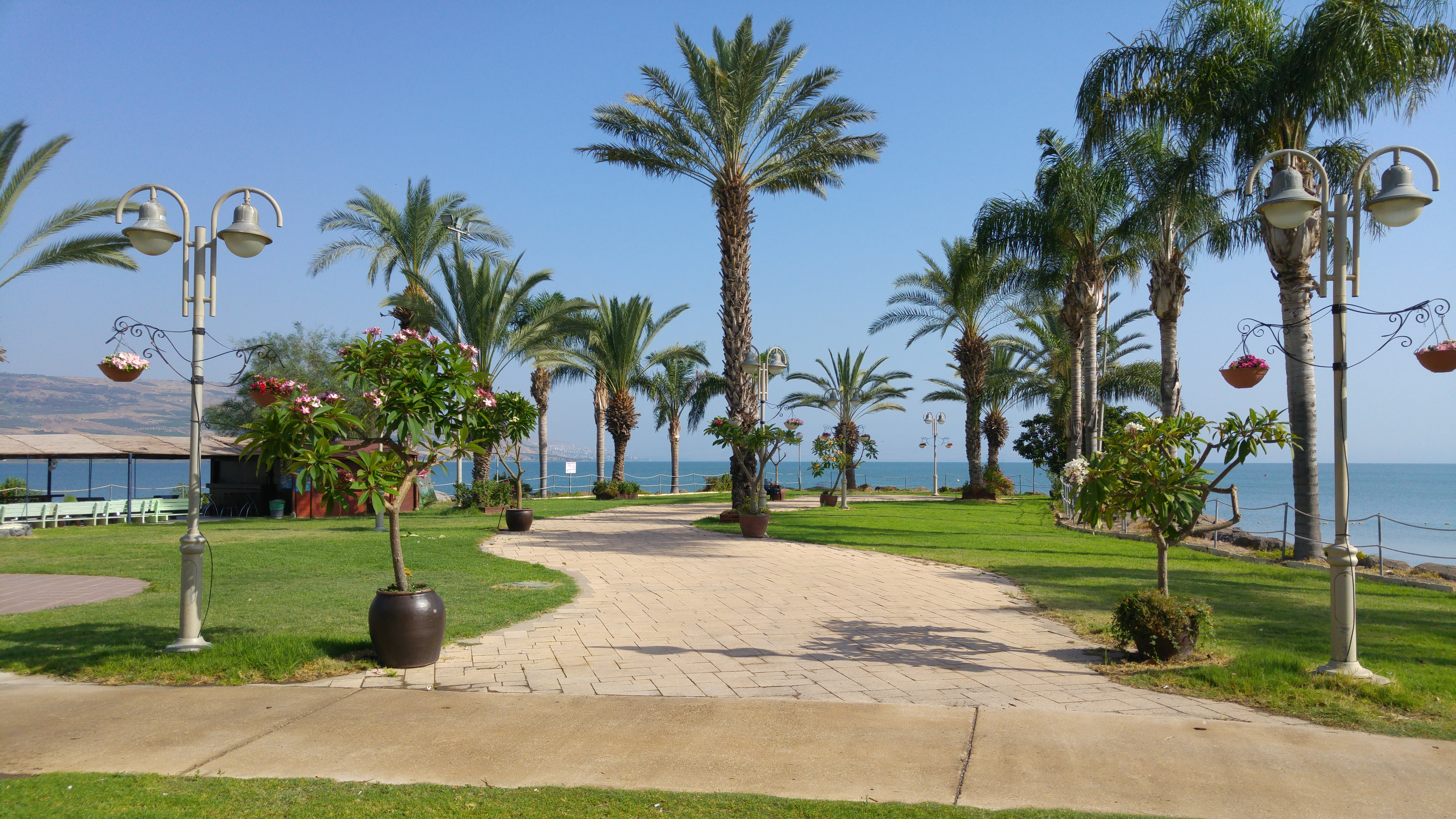
- Etymology: Harbour
- Location within Northeast Israel Location within Israel
- Coordinates: 32°42′23″N 35°36′0″E
- Country: Israel
- District: Northern
- Subdistrict: Kinneret
- Council: Emek HaYarden
- Affiliation: Kibbutz Movement
- Founded: 1949
- Founder: Transylvanian immigrants
- Population (2024): 894
- Website: www.maagan.org.il

Ma'agan (Hebrew: מעגן, lit. 'Harbour') is a kibbutz in northern Israel. Located on the southern shore of the Sea of Galilee, it falls under the jurisdiction of Emek HaYarden Regional Council. In 2024 it had a population of 894.

== History ==
The village was founded in 1949 by immigrants from Transylvania on land located near the Arab village of Samakh, which was depopulated in 1948. Notable residents include Ami Ayalon, who grew up in the kibbutz.

Due to the fact it was situated in the Israel–Syria demilitarised zone under the 1949 Armistice Agreements, Ma'agan was claimed by Syria as its territory during negotiations for a peace agreement in the 1990s. The Israeli government rejected the claims, as it would have led to Syria having territory west of the 1923 border between Mandatory Palestine and the French Mandate of Syria.
