= Samakh, Tiberias =

Samakh سمخ Samach
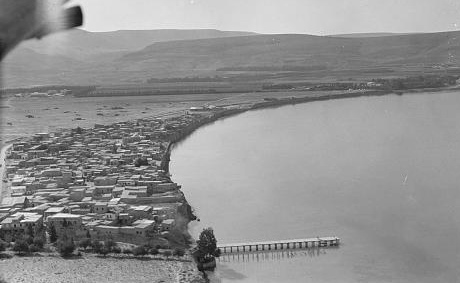
- Samakh from the air, 1931
- Etymology: "fish" or "gum"
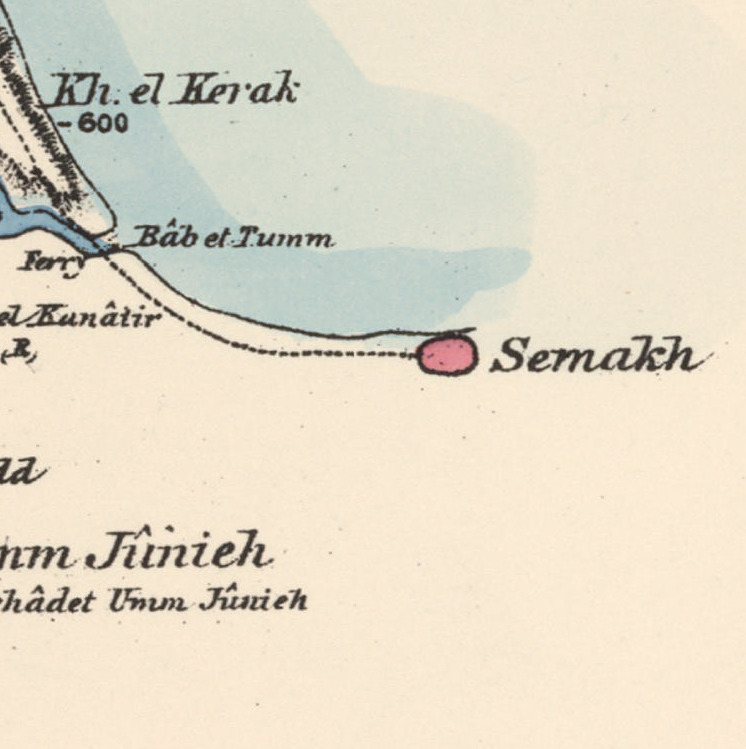
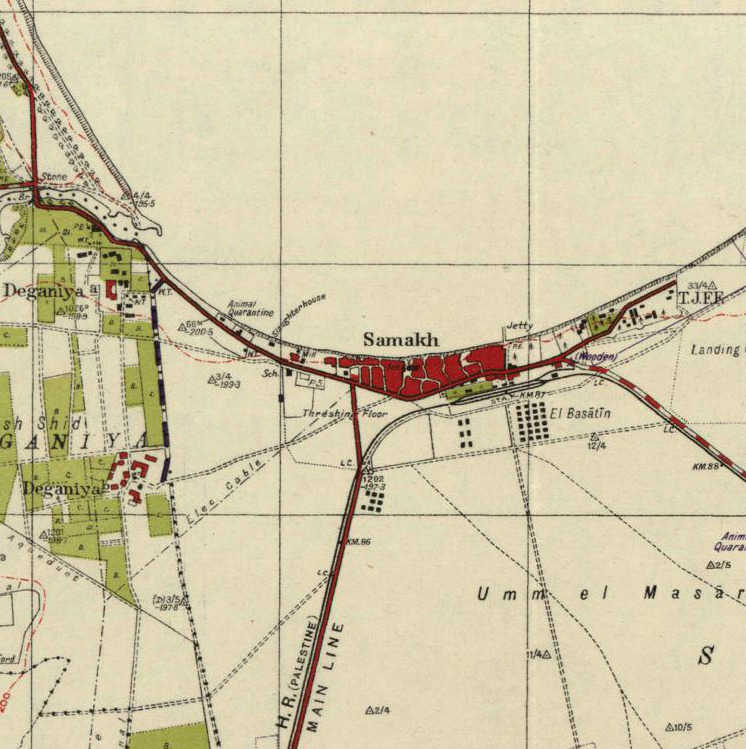
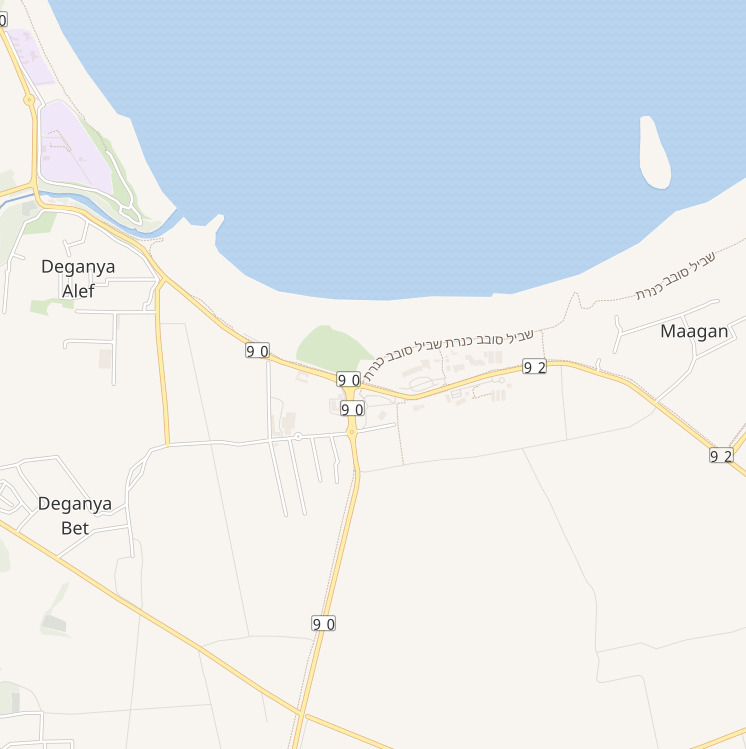
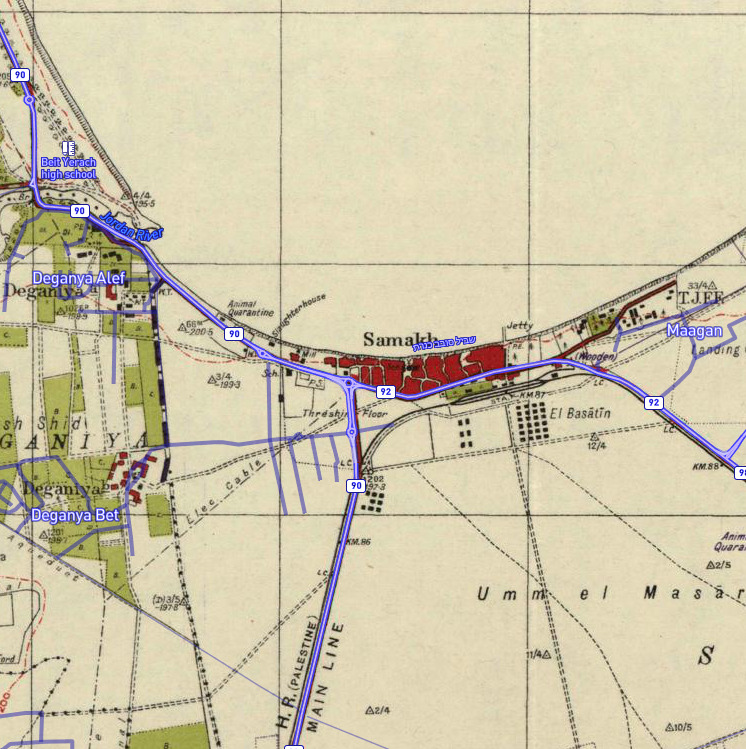
- 1870s map 1940s map modern map 1940s with modern overlay map A series of historical maps of the area around Samakh, Tiberias (click the buttons)

- Location within Mandatory Palestine
- Coordinates: 32°42′18″N 35°35′15″E
- Palestine grid: 205/234
- Geopolitical entity: Mandatory Palestine
- Subdistrict: Tiberias
- Date of depopulation: 28 April 1948

Area
  - Total: 9,265 dunams (9.265 km^{2}; 3.577 sq mi)

Population (1945)
  - Total: 3,460
- Cause(s) of depopulation: Military assault by Yishuv forces
- Current Localities: Ma'agan Tel Katzir Masada, Sha'ar HaGolan

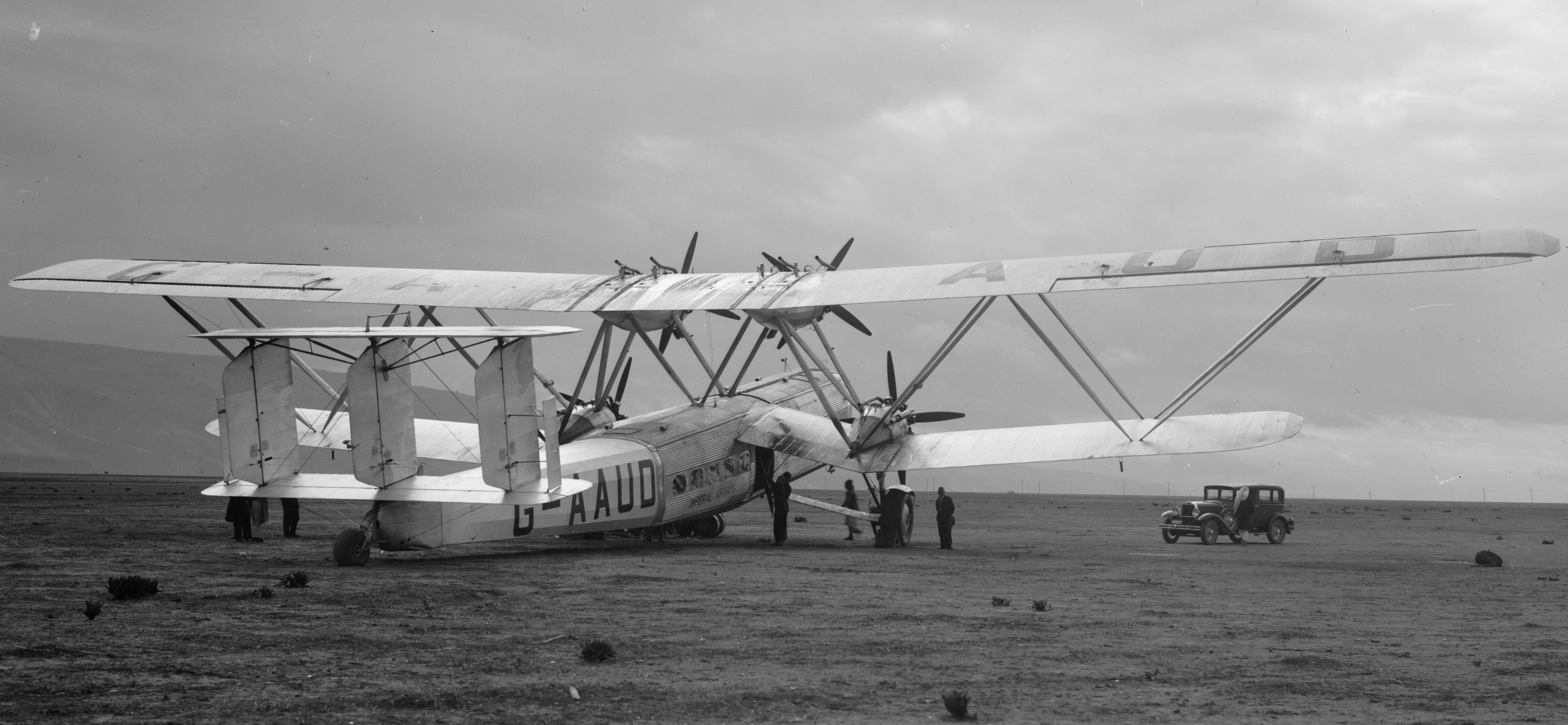
Handley Page H.P.42, British four-engined long-range biplane airliner of Imperial Airways, at Samakh, October 1931.

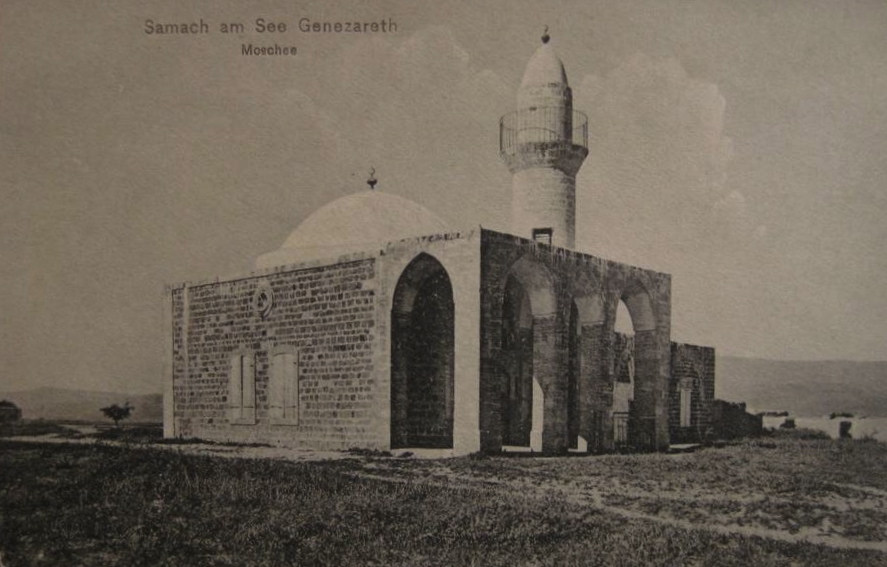
The mosque at Samakh, between WWI and WW2

Samakh (Arabic: سمخ) was a Palestinian Arab village at the south end of Lake Tiberias (the Sea of Galilee) in Ottoman Galilee and later Mandatory Palestine (now in Israel). It was the site of battle in 1918 during World War I.

In the 19th century, Algerian migrants settled in Samakh, transforming it into one of the largest Algerian concentrations in the district. Between 1905 and 1948, the town was an important stop on the Jezreel Valley railway and Hejaz railway, being the last effective stop in the British Mandate of Palestine (the station at al-Hamma was geographically isolated). It had a population of 3,320 Arab Muslims and Arab Christians in 1945.

The town's inhabitants fled after Haganah forces captured the town on 3 March 1948, and the remainder left in the wake of an assault by the Golani Brigade against the Syrian army on 18 April 1948. Most of the former residents became internally displaced refugees in the Arab city of Nazareth. Today, the Tzemah Industrial Zone and part of kibbutz Ma'agan are on the site of the former village.

== Location ==
The village was on flat land in the Jordan Valley, on the southernmost shore of Lake Tiberias, only a short distance east of the point where River Jordan exits from the lake. Samakh was the largest village in the Tiberias district in terms of area and population and was a major transportation link. A station served the village on the railroad line that ran on the Jezreel Valley railway, an extension of the Hejaz Railway. This railway station was the border station between the British Mandate of Palestine and the French Mandate of Syria. It lay on a highway that ran along the lake shore and led to the city of Tiberias in the northwest. Sailing routes on Lake Tiberias also linked Samakh with Tiberias's harbour.

== History ==
=== Ottoman era ===
In the late Ottoman era, Pierre Jacotin named the village Semak on his map from 1799. Most houses were built of adobe, but some were built of the black (basalt) stone that was abundant in the Golan area near Samakh. Johann Ludwig Burckhardt, a Swiss traveler to Palestine who saw the village (which he called Szammagh), in 1812, described it as a collection of thirty or forty mud houses alongside more costly houses built of black stone. He said about 100 faddans (1 fadda = 100–250 dunams) were cultivated in the immediate vicinity.

In 1838 Edward Robinson also found the village to contain 30-40 adobe huts, and a few built of black stone.

In 1875, Victor Guérin found the village to be divided into two parts, and built of adobe bricks or volcanic stones. In 1881, the PEF's Survey of Western Palestine described it as a village of 200 inhabitants who cultivated the surrounding plain.

G. Schumacher, who visited the site in 1883, described the village as being inhabited mostly by people who immigrated there from Algiers.

Samakh was the location of one of the first airfields in Palestine, built by the Turks (with German assistance) in 1917 for military use.

==== Battle of Samakh ====
The village and its railway station were the site of a battle between British/Australian and German/Turkish forces in World War I. The battle ended in an Allied victory and opened up the way to Damascus for General Allenby's troops. It was described by Field Marshal Wavell as the most fierce and cruel battle in the Palestinian theater.

=== British Mandate era ===
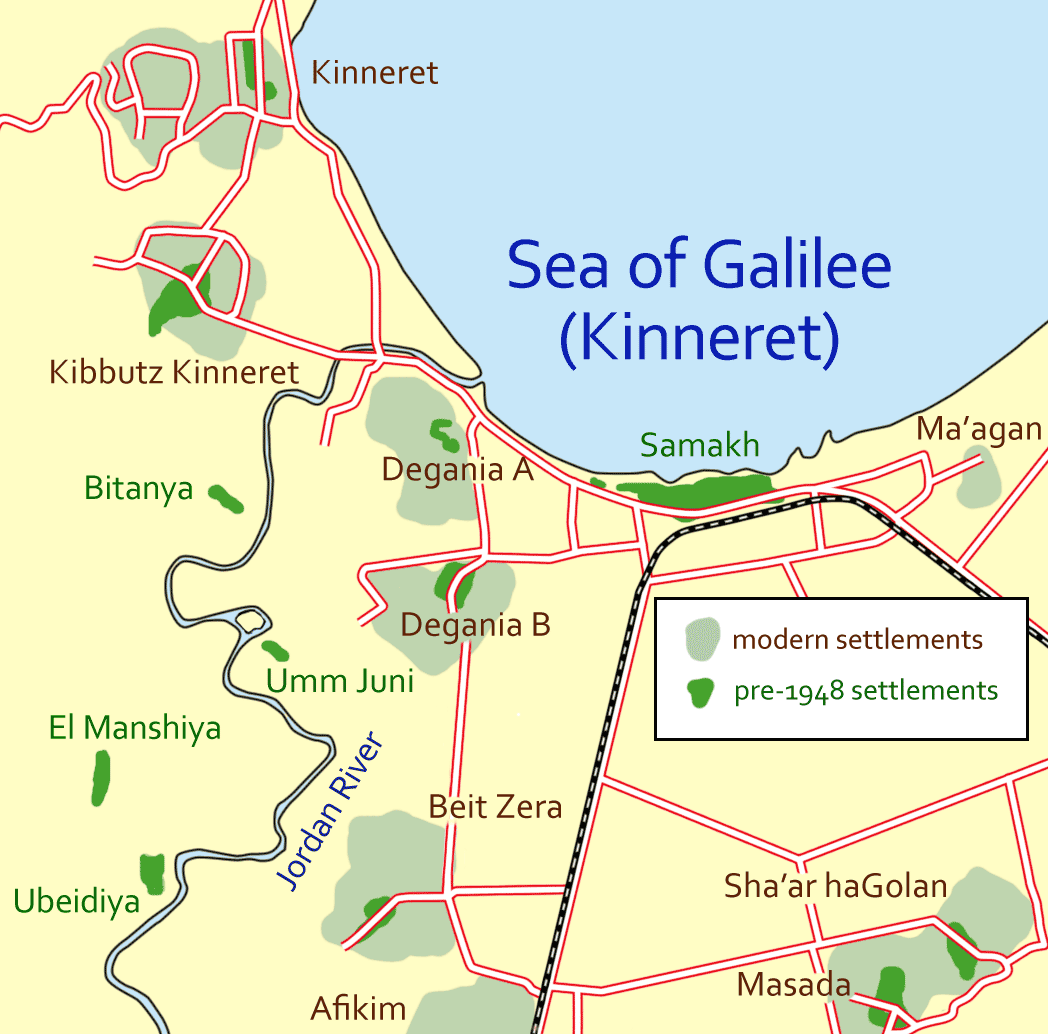
Samakh region in historical perspective.

During the British Mandate era Samakh grew in importance, because of its railway station at the border of Palestine to Syria.

The railway provided Damascene with access to the Mediterranean through Haifa, along a route partly outside French control. In 1922, high freight rates in French Mandate regions led merchants to send large quantities of goods to Haifa rather than Beirut. Approximately half of those goods where re-exported to ports in the French Mandate. Hence in 1923, the French High commissioner required Damas, Hama et Prolongement railway company to reduce its freight rates by one third. Damascene merchants continued to use the route to Haifa as a leverage in disputes concerning transport through Beirut.

Customs officials also continued to operate at Samakh despite the regional customs-free trade arrangement. It is in the railway's passport-control office, that travellers, crossing between Palestine and Syria needed to show a valid passport issued by their own government and a visa from the neighbouring regional administration.

==== Growth ====
In the 1922 census of Palestine, conducted by the British Mandate authorities, Samakh, together with Al-Hamma, had a total population of 976. Of these, 922 were Muslims, 28 Jews, one follower of the Baháʼí Faith and 25 Christians; where the Christians were 6 Orthodox, 1 Roman Catholic, 2 Melkite, 11 Armenian and 5 Anglican. In the 1931 census the population had increased to 1900; 4 Druse, 76 Christians, 40 Jews and 1780 Muslims, in a total of 480 houses.

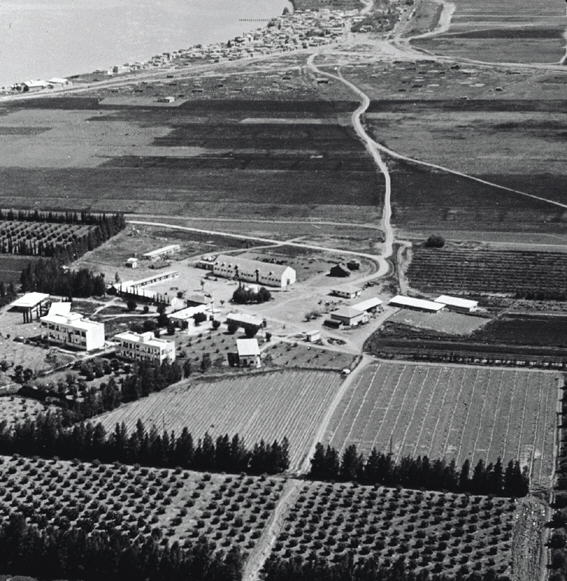
Samakh 1925, Degania in foreground

In 1923 a local council was created, which still administered Samakh by 1945. The council's expenditure grew steadily, from P£310 in 1929 to P£1,100 in 1944.

In 1929–1935, the airfield in Samakh was used for Imperial Airways passenger services as a stop en route to Baghdad and further to Karachi. Difficult weather conditions in the area led to destruction of a Hannibal aircraft, and to relocation of the passenger services to Gaza.

In the 1944/45 statistics, the population of Samakh had increased to 3,320 Muslims, 130 Christians and 10 of other faiths, a total of 3,460 persons. The majority of the population belonged to the settled Bedouin tribes of the 'Arab al-Suqur and 'Arab al-Bashatiwa. The village had two schools, one for boys and another for girls. Their chief crops were bananas and grain; in 1944/45 8,523 dunums were planted in cereals, while 239 dunams were built-up (urban) land.

==== 1948 events ====
The village was captured by the Haganah in the 1947–1948 Civil War in Mandatory Palestine, along with the British border guard base nearby, and became a military outpost.

=== Israeli period ===
Samakh that changed hands twice in the Battles of the Kinarot Valley, between the Haganah and the Syrian Army. On May 21, 1949, after the Syrian retreat, the Haganah set up a position in Samakh.

Walid Khalidi wrote in 1992, that the structure remaining of Samakh was the ruins of the railway station and a water reservoir. The members of Degania Alef kibbutz built a public park, a petrol station, and factories known as the Tzemah Factories on the village site. The Kinneret College is also located there.

The Tzemah Junction developed next to the site of Samakh. It connects Highway 90, which follows the western shore of the lake, with Highway 92, which follows the eastern shore and also branches off east of the junction into Highway 98, which leads up the Golan Heights. Near the road junction is the Tzemach regional center, with a public beach, a sprawling shopping centre, an industrial area and so forth.

The kibbutzim Masada and Sha'ar HaGolan were established southeast of the village site in 1937, and have since expanded onto lands within Samakh's former jurisdiction. Both Ma'agan and the nearby kibbutz Tel Katzir were built on Samakh's land in 1949. The kibbutzim Deganya Alef and Deganya Bet are also close to Samakh's location, but not on land that belonged to the village.

== See also ==
- Depopulated Palestinian locations in Israel

== Bibliography ==
- Barron, J.B., ed. (1923). Palestine: Report and General Abstracts of the Census of 1922. Government of Palestine.
- Burckhardt, J.L. (1822). Travels in Syria and the Holy Land. London: J. Murray.
- Conder, C.R.; Kitchener, H.H. (1881). The Survey of Western Palestine: Memoirs of the Topography, Orography, Hydrography, and Archaeology. Vol. 1. London: Committee of the Palestine Exploration Fund.
- Department of Statistics (1945). Village Statistics, April, 1945. Government of Palestine.
- Guérin, V. (1880). Description Géographique Historique et Archéologique de la Palestine (in French). Vol. 3: Galilee, pt. 1. Paris: L'Imprimerie Nationale.
- Hadawi, S. (1970). Village Statistics of 1945: A Classification of Land and Area ownership in Palestine. Palestine Liberation Organization Research Center.
- Irby, C.L.; Mangles, J. (1823). Travels in Egypt and Nubia, Syria, and Asia Minor; during the years 1817 & 1818. London: Printed for Private Distribution by T. White & Co.
- Karmon, Y. (1960). "An Analysis of Jacotin's Map of Palestine" (PDF). Israel Exploration Journal. 10 (3, 4): 155–173, 244–253. Archived from the original (PDF) on 2019-12-22.
- Khalidi, W. (1992). All That Remains: The Palestinian Villages Occupied and Depopulated by Israel in 1948. Washington D.C.: Institute for Palestine Studies. ISBN 0-88728-224-5.
- Mills, E., ed. (1932). Census of Palestine 1931. Population of Villages, Towns and Administrative Areas. Jerusalem: Government of Palestine.
- Morris, B. (2004). The Birth of the Palestinian Refugee Problem Revisited. Cambridge University Press. ISBN 978-0-521-00967-6. (pp. 132, 177, 186, 260, 269, 372)
- Murray, Lawrence (1997). The Amazing Spread of Christianity. St. Jude Press. ISBN 0-9722149-2-5.
- Palmer, E.H. (1881). The Survey of Western Palestine: Arabic and English Name Lists Collected During the Survey by Lieutenants Conder and Kitchener, R. E. Transliterated and Explained by E.H. Palmer. Committee of the Palestine Exploration Fund.
- Robinson, E.; Smith, E. (1841). Biblical Researches in Palestine, Mount Sinai and Arabia Petraea: A Journal of Travels in the year 1838. Vol. 3. Boston: Crocker & Brewster.
- Schumacher, G. (1888). The Jaulân: surveyed for the German Society for the Exploration of the Holy Land. London: Richard Bentley & Son.
