= Wadi al-Hawa =

River in Syria

Coordinates: 32°53′00″N 35°37′23″E

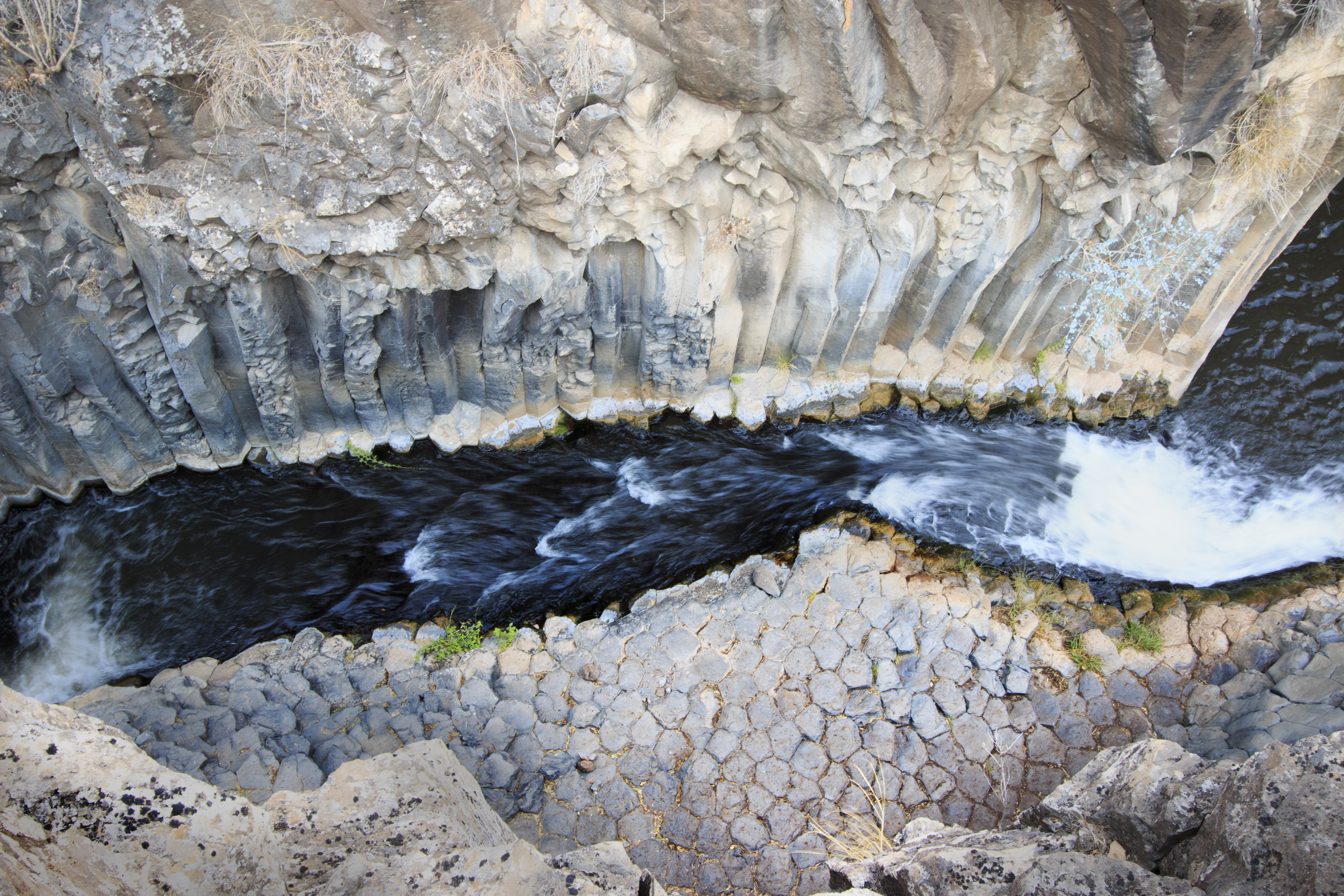
Wadi al-Hawa, with prominent hexagonal basalt columns

The Wadi al-Hawa (Arabic: وادي الهوى, romanized: Wādī al-Hawā); also known as Wādī al-Fākhūra (Note: Arabic: وادي الفاخورة) or Wādī al-Zakī (Note: Arabic: وادي الزكي) is a river located in the Golan Heights, within the Quneitra Governorate of Syria. The stream is referred to by Israeli authorities as the Meshushim Stream (Hebrew: נחל משושים, romanized: Nahal Meshushim, lit. 'Hexagons Stream'), and, under Israeli occupation, it is administered as part of the Yehudiya Forest Nature Reserve.

35 km long, it starts from the foothills of Mount Avital and discharges via the Butayhah Basin into the Sea of Galilee.

The stream owes its Hebrew name to the hexagonal basalt columns visible on the banks in the central part of its course. A prominent example of this kind of geology and a tourist attraction is the Hexagon Pool.

Of the many affluents from the steam's 160 km^{2} drainage area, the most prominent ones are the Zavitan Stream and the intermittent Katzrin Stream.

It is the only river in the Quneitra Governorate not impounded in reservoirs.

== See also ==
- List of rivers of Syria
