= Yehudiya =

Archaeological site in the Golan Heights

Coordinates: 32°56′16″N 35°42′15″E

Yehudiya or Yehudiyye (Arabic: يهودية, lit. "Jewish") is an abandoned village and archaeological site in the center of the Golan Heights, about 5 kilometers south of Katzrin within the Yehudiya Forest Nature Reserve.

== History ==
=== Ancient Jewish settlement ===
In the houses of the village, artifacts were found which attest to the existence of a settlement from the Roman–Byzantine period. According to multiple testimonies, there was a Jewish presence there after the Arab conquest. The Jewish past of the settlement was known to the Arabs who settled there later, hence its name.

It is one of several possible identifications for Soganaea, a village fortified by Josephus in preparation for the First Jewish–Roman War.

=== Modern times ===
In the 19th century Arab peasants settled in the village houses. Near the village there is a large stone house that was used as a farm and employed many local villagers. After the establishment of the State of Israel, the Syrians renamed the village "Arabiya" to blur its Jewish past. The village was depopulated in 1967 with the occupation of the Golan Heights by the IDF during the Six-Day War. The ruins of the village are now part of the Yehudiya Forest reserve, covering 66 square kilometers.

In October 2025, archaeologists from the Zinman Institute of Archaeology at the University of Haifa and the Department of Land of Israel Studies at Kinneret College unearthed a 1,500-year-old synagogue near the village.
