= Butayhah Basin =

Valley in Syria

Coordinates: 32.8845°N 35.6381°E

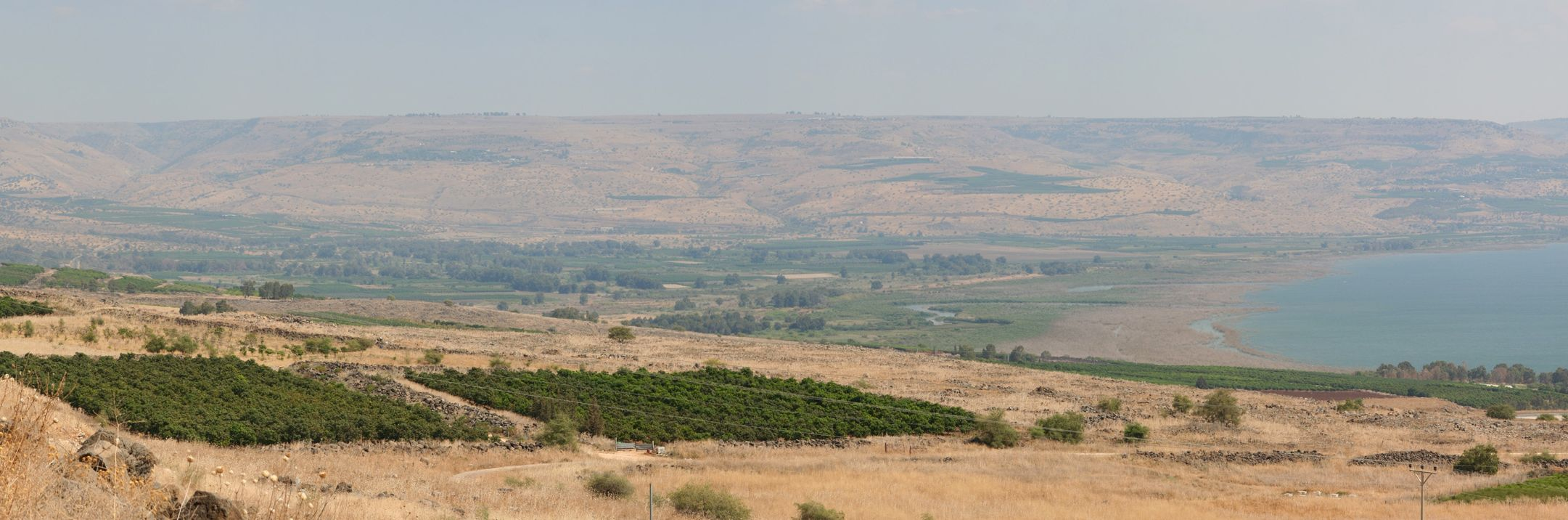
Butayhah Basin by the Sea of Galilee

The Butayhah Basin (Arabic: بقعة البطيحة, romanized: Buq'at al-Butayhah; Hebrew: בקעת הבטיחה, lit. 'Bethsaida Valley') is a valley by the northeast shores of the Sea of Galilee at the steep foothills of the central Golan Heights (administered by Israel).

== Etymology ==
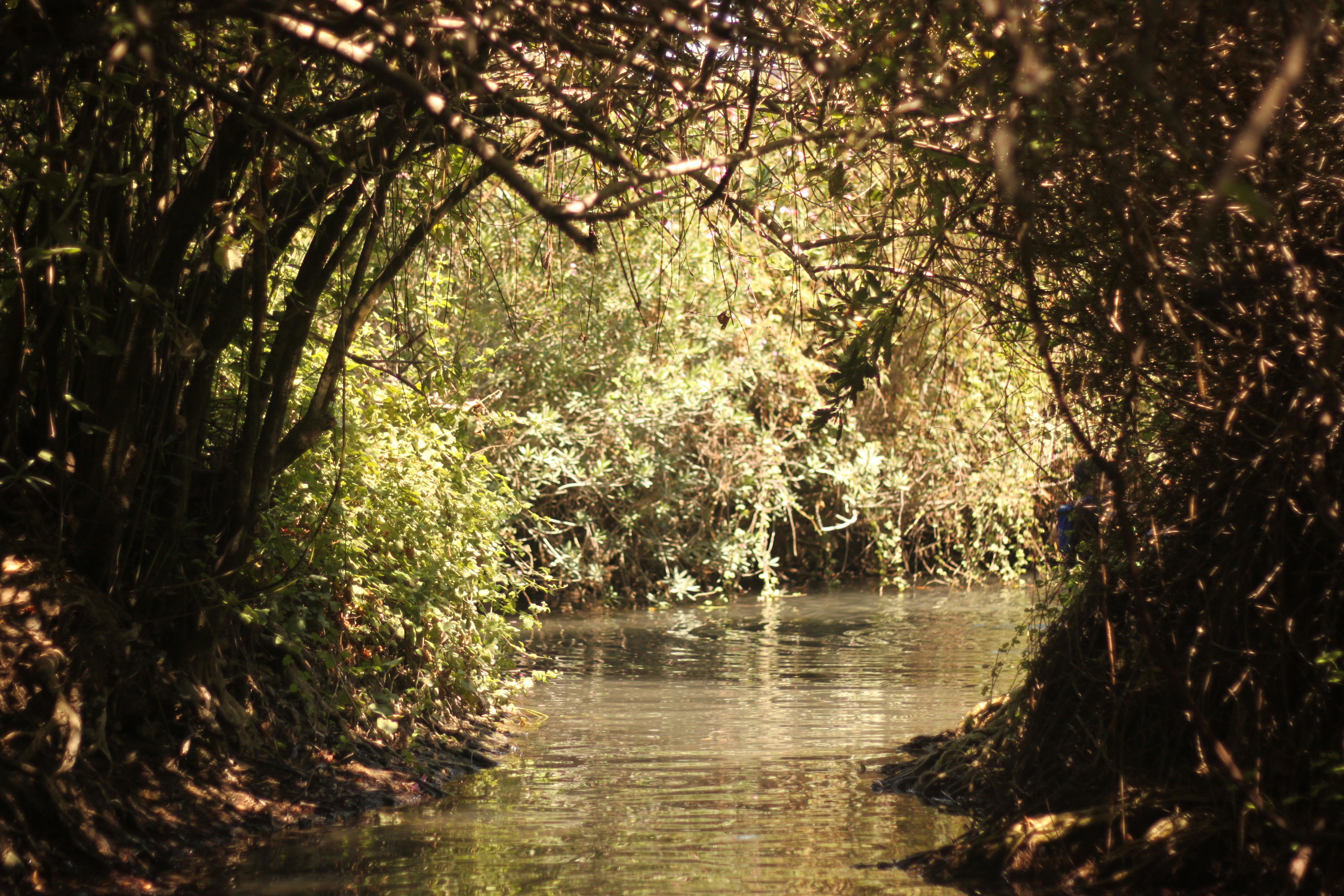
Majrassa nature reserve in Butayhah basin

The name of the valley Buq'at al-Butayhah is also spelled Bik'at Beteiha, or el-Batikha.

Bethsaida Valley is the modern, administratively assigned name used by Israeli authorities, derived from the ancient town of Bethsaida, best known from the New Testament. In Hebrew beit means house, and tzed means both hunting and fishing. The resulting name means either "house of the fisherman" or "house of the hunter". The Hebrew Beit-tzaida, adapted to Greek phonetics (the New Testament was written in Greek) and transliterated to Latin, yields Bethsaida.

== Wetlands ==
The Jordan River and the streams coming down from the Central Golan create a landscape of swamps and open water surfaces, variously called deltas, estuaries or lagoons.

The following five rivers or streams flow through the valley (west to east): Jordan, whose upper course ends here, at the northern edge; then Meshushim (Wadi el-Hawa in Arabic; collects the waters of the Katzrin and Zavitan streams), Yehudiya (with Batra as a tributary), Daliyot, and Sfamnun/Sfamnon (Hebrew: נחל שפמנון Nahal Sfamnon). The wetlands are protected as part of the Majrase – Betiha (Bethsaida Valley) Nature Reserve. The reserve covers 6.930 dunams, some of it agricultural land, and represents a sequence of habitats (river, marshland, lagoon, and lake habitat).

The Meshushim River, which has already received the waters of Zavitan, and the Yehudiya River, merge shortly before reaching the lake and form the Zaki estuary, while Daliyot River creates the Majrase or Majrassa estuary, also known as the Daliyot River estuary. The Majrase is the largest freshwater nature reserve controlled by Israel.

== Archaeology ==
Multiple archaeological sites, including dolmens, suggest that it was settled by farmers and fishermen since the early Bronze Age. From the Second Temple period through the Byzantine period it was densely populated.
