= Gad Degani =

Israeli Professor

Prof. Gad Degani
- גד דגני
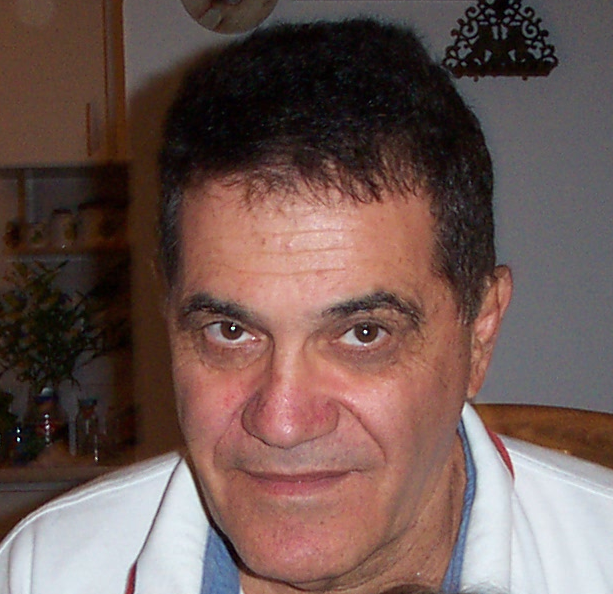
- Born: 6 February 1943 (age 83); Israel
- Citizenship: Israel
- Education: BSc, from University of Haifa, MSc in Biology from Technion, PhD in the faculty of Life Sciences from Tel Aviv University

Gad Degani (Hebrew: גד דגני; born 6 February 1943) is an Israeli Professor in the Faculty of Agriculture in the Hebrew University of Jerusalem, and Professor in the Faculty of science and technology in the Tel-Hai Academic College. Degani is life sciences researcher, zoologist, eco-physiologist, and genetic ecologist. Degani is the initiator and founder of the science and technology faculty in the Tel-Hai Academic College and one of the founders of the MIGAL research institute in Kiryat Shmona.

== Biography ==
Degani was born in Kibbutz Dan, to a family that founded the Kibbutz during the Tower and Stockade (Homa u’Migdal) settlement period, He attended high school in the Kibbutz. In 1962, Degani joined the Nahal as a Kibbutz member, and later on, took an officer course and served as a Platoon commander and an emergency battalion communications officer in the artillery corps base in Shivta, where he also served on reserve until the Six Day War. After the war, he requested to transfer to an infantry corps battalion, and continued to serve as a company commander and later on as a battalion commander as a lieutenant colonel. Upon release from service, Degani returned to Kibbutz Dan, was in charge of the Nahal settlement in the Kibbutz and reestablished Hashomer Hatzair nest in Kiryat Shemona.

== Academic career ==
In 1976, Degani graduated from his MSc in Biology in the Technion, and in 1979 he completed his PhD in the faculty of Life Sciences in the Tel Aviv University. He started his way as a lecturer in zoology in the field of vertebrates and invertebrates. Later on, he studied fields of biotechnology of agriculture and water, and specialized in the nutrition and reproduction of fish. In 1981–1982 he served as a research fellow in the Technion biology department, and between 1983 and 1984 he served as a guest scientist in East Carolina University, United States, where he was also an adjunct professor in 1993. Additionally, he served as a guest scientist in New York City University in Brooklyn in 1991, and in Maryland University in 1994. Between 1990 and 2000 Degani was the head of the Golan Research Institute (today known as the Shamir Research Institute).

Degani is one of the founders of the MIGAL research center in Kiryat Shemona, and he served as the scientific manager of the institute between 1986 and 2011. In 1990, Degani initiated a cooperation with Aliza Amir-Zohar, a member of Kibbutz Bar'am who served as the manager of the regional Tel-Hai Academic College, and with Ya’akov Arazi, the manager of the MIGAL institute, that founded the association founding the science school, that later becomes the science faculty in the Tel-Hai Academic College. Initially, the association submitted a request to open three programs in the college: biotechnology, environmental studies and computer engineering studies. These programs were the core of the Science School, that became, upon reception of the approval of the high education committee in 1993, the faculty of science and technology. Between 1999 and 2003, Degani served as the faculty dean.

In 1996, Degani initiated the opening of other departments in the college, including the environmental studies department, the biotechnology department and the nutrition department. He also initiated the MA in biotechnology, a program which Degani headed since its establishment and until it was approved by the high education committee. Later on, he initiated a BSc in life science. Since 1997, Degani serves as an associate professor, and later on as a professor in the Faculty of Agriculture in the Hebrew University of Jerusalem, and since 1998 he serves as a professor in the faculty of science and technology in the Tel-Hai Academic College. He also served as the academic manager of the Faculty of Agriculture exchange in the Tel-Hai Academic College, between 1987 and 1999, and started the MA program for Masters in biotechnology, which he headed between 2008 and 2013. In 2021, Degani received the Yakir Certificate from Tel Hai Academic College in recognition of the construction of a faculty of science and technology at this college.

== Research and publications ==
Degani research area are: Aquaculture-related biotechnology, molecular endocrinology and molecular markers used in ecology and aquaculture, Biology and ecology of fish and amphibians and their adaptation to various habitats. Gene expression mechanisms in hormonal control of fish growth and reproduction, Animals and fish in the ecological system and environmental effects on habitat selection, Fish and amphibian nutrition, Molecular markers in fish, Aquacultural biotechnology, Fish Nutrition.

Degani published more than 200 essays in peer-reviewed academic journals in life science, mostly in biology, ecology and physiology of fish and amphibians, nutrition of fish and amphibians, the hormonal influence on growth and reproduction of fish (molecular endocrinology) and animal behavior in the ecological system. For his studies, Degani focused on fish growth, controlling their reproduction using hormones and molecular diversity between fish species.

Published works (Partial List):

=== Books ===
- Degani, G & Yom-Din, G., Research on new fish species for aquaculture in northern Israel. Haifa, Israel: Ayalon Offset Ltd, 2005
- Degani, G., Blue gourami (Truchogaster trichopterus) model for labyrinth fish, Israel: Laser Pages Publishing, 2001
- Degani, G., The salamander at the southern limit of its distribution. Israel: Laser Pages Publishing, 1996
- Degani, G. & Gallagher, M.L, Growth and nutrition of eels. Israel: Laser Pages Publishing, 1995
- Degani, G. 2019. The Fire salamandra (Salamandra infraimmaculata) and the Banded newt (Triturus vittatus) along the southern border of their. Published by Scientific Research Publishing, Inc, 2019 ISBN 978-1-61896-693-3

=== Articles ===
- Degani, G., Veksler-Lublinsky, I and Meerson, A., Markers of Genetic Variation in Blue Gourami (Trichogaster trichopterus) as a Model for Labyrinth Fish. Biology. 10, 228, 2021 doi:10.3390/biology10030228
- Atre, Ishwar; Mizrahi, Naama; Hausken, Krist; Yom-Din, Svetlana; Hurvitz, Avshalom; Degani, Gad; Levavi-Sivan, Berta (1 February 2021). "Molecular characterization of kisspeptin receptors and gene expression analysis during oogenesis in the Russian sturgeon (Acipenser gueldenstaedtii)". General and Comparative Endocrinology. 302 113691. doi:10.1016/j.ygcen.2020.113691. ISSN 0016-6480. PMID 33301759.
- Degani, G., Brain control reproduction by the endocrine system of female blue gourami (Trichogaster trichopterus). Biology. 9:109, 2020, pp. 1–16 doi:10.3390/biology9050109
- Degani, G., Ecological and Genetic Variation of the Distribution of Various Species of Amphibians at the Southern Border of their Distribution, Int J Plant Anim Environ Sci. 9, 2019, pp. 21–41
- Degani, Gad; Hurvitz, Avshalom; Eliraz, Yaniv; Meerson, Ari (1 January 2019). "Sex-related gonadal gene expression differences in the Russian sturgeon (Acipenser gueldenstaedtii) grown in stable aquaculture conditions". Animal Reproduction Science. 200: 75–85. doi:10.1016/j.anireprosci.2018.11.013. ISSN 0378-4320. PMID 30522703.
- Gal Levy, G., and Degani, G., The role of brain peptides in the reproduction of blue gourami males (Trichogaster trichopterus), J. Exp. Zool. 9999A, 2013, pp. 1–10 doi:10.1002/jez.1809
- Levy, G. and Degani, G., Involvement of GnRH, PACAP and PRP in the Reproduction of Blue Gourami Females (Trichogaster trichopterus), J Mol Neurosci, 2012 doi:10.1007/s12031-012-9730-8
- Levy, G. and Degani, G., Evidence for a reproduction-related function of pituitary adenylate cyclase-activating polypeptide-related peptide (PRP) in an Anabantidae fish. J. Mol. Endo. 46, 2011, pp. 1–11 doi:10.1530/JME-10-0065
- Goldberg, T., Eviatar, E. & Degani, G., Breeding site selection according to suitability for amphibian larval growth under various ecological conditions in the semi-arid zone of northern Israel, Ecologia Mediterranea 35, 2009, pp. 65–74
- Ezagouri, M, Yom-Din, S., Goldberg, D., Jackson, K., Levavi-Sivan, B. & Degani, G. Expression of the two CYP19 (P450 aromatase) genes in the male and female blue gourami (Trichogaster trichopterus) during the reproduction cycle. Gen. Comp. Endo., 159, 2008, pp. 208–213
- Tzchori, I., Degani, G., Hurvitz, A. & Moav, B., Cloning and developmental expression of the cytochrome P450 aromatase gene (CYP19) in the European eel (Anguilla anguilla). Gen. Comp. Endocrin., 138, 2004, pp. 271–280 doi:10.1016/j.ygcen.2008.08.009
- Degani, G., Goldberg, D., Tzchori, I., Hurvitz, A., Yom-Din, S. and Jackson, K., Cloning of European eel (Anguilla anguilla) FSH subunit, and expression of FSH and LH in males and females after sex determination. Comp. Biochem. Physiol., B 136, 2003, pp. 283–203 doi:10.1016/S1096-4959(03)00207-0
- Degani, G. & Kaplan, D., Distribution of amphibian larvae in Israeli habitats with changeable water availability. Hydrobiologia, 405, 1999, pp. 49–56
- Jackson, K., Goldberg, G., Ofir, Abraham, M. & Degani, G., Blue gourami (Trichogaster trichopterus) gonadotropic subunits (I & II) cDNA sequences and expression during oogenesis, J. Mol. Endocrinol. 23, 1999, pp. 177–187
- Degani, G.; Viola, S.; Yehuda, Y. (1 January 1997). "Apparent digestibility coefficient of protein sources for carp, Cyprinus carpio L." Aquaculture Research. 28 (1): 23–28. doi:10.1046/j.1365-2109.1997.00825.x. ISSN 1355-557X.
- Degani, Gad (1993). "Effect of Sexual Behavior on Oocyte Development and Steroid Changes in Trichogaster trichopterus (Pallas)". Copeia. 1993 (4): 1091–1096. doi:10.2307/1447089. ISSN 0045-8511. JSTOR 1447089.
- Degani, G.; Schreibman, M. P. (1 September 1993). "Pheromone of male blue gourami and its effect on vitellogcnesis, steroidogenesis and gonadotropin cells in pituitary of the female". Journal of Fish Biology. 43 (3): 475–485. Bibcode:1993JFBio..43..475D. doi:10.1111/j.1095-8649.1993.tb00582.x. ISSN 0022-1112.
- Degani, G. Cannibalism among Salamandra salamandra (L.) larvae. Isr. J. Zool. 39, 1993, pp. 125–129
