= Eliezer Shalev =

Israeli gynecologist

Professor Eliezer Shalev
- אליעזר שלו
- Born: Afula, Israel
- Education: Technion Israel Institute of Technology (MD 1977)
- Known for: Pioneering obstetric ultrasonography in Israel; Founding staff of Guangdong Technion Israel Institute of Technology; President of Tel Hai Academic College
- Medical career
- Profession: Physician, researcher, university president
- Field: Obstetrics and gynecology
- Institutions: HaEmek Medical Center; Technion Israel Institute of Technology; Guangdong Technion; Tel Hai Academic College
- Awards: Lifetime Achievement Award (Ministry of Health, 2017)

Eliezer Shalev (Hebrew: אליעזר שלו) is an Israeli gynecologist and current President of Tel Hai Academic College. He also serves as Chairman of the Israeli Ministry of Health National Council for Gynecology, Neonatology and Genetics.

One of the pioneers of obstetric ultrasonography in Israel, Eliezer Shalev previously served as Dean of the Rappaport Faculty of Medicine at the Technion Israel Institute of Technology, Vice-Chancellor of Guangdong Technion, and Chairman of the Israeli Society of Obstetrics and Gynecology.

== Biography ==
Eliezer Shalev was born and raised in Afula in northern Israel. He currently lives in Binyamina, is married and has five children.

=== Education and early career ===
Eliezer Shalev began his medical studies in 1970 at the University of Bologna in Italy, and received his doctorate in medicine from the Technion Israel Institute of Technology in Haifa, in 1977.

In 1977, he started his residency at HaEmek Medical Center in his hometown of Afula, specializing in gynecology, obstetrics and fertility. In 1982, he trained in gynecologic and obstetric ultrasonography at Queen Charlotte's Hospital in London, before returning to Israel and completing his residency training in 1983.

=== Medical career ===
Starting his medical practice at HaEmek Medical Center, Eliezer Shalev focused his initial research on fetal physiology. During this time period, he successfully performed an in utero operation to treat a urinary tract obstruction in a fetus, and performed fetal cardiac resuscitation, among other complex procedures.

Shalev became one of the first medical doctors in Israel to employ ultrasonography in gynecology and obstetrics. In 1981, while still on his residency in Afula, he demonstrated a novel technique to determine a fetus's sex using ultrasound. Between 1985 and 1988, Shalev demonstrated the regular use of ultrasound to conduct cordocentesis, a novel procedure at the time. In 1988, he took part in the establishment of the Ultrasound Unit at Sheba Medical Center, Israel's largest hospital, and in 1995, he helped found the Israeli Society of Ultrasound in Obstetrics and Gynecology, serving as its first elected chairman.

In 1989, Shalev became Head of the Department of Obstetrics and Gynecology at HaEmek Medical Center, a position he held until 2016.

=== Academic career ===
Eliezer Shalev became a senior lecturer at the Technion in 1992. In 2001–2002 he was visiting professor at the University of British Columbia, and in 2003 returned to Haifa to lead the Technion American Medical School (TeAMS) program, after which he became Professor of Obstetrics and Gynecology. In 2005, he was appointed Associate Dean of the Rappaport Faculty of Medicine.

In 2011, Shalev was elected Dean of the Technion's Faculty of Medicine, serving until 2016. His tenure as Dean was characterized by development of the Faculty's international ties, signing partnerships and agreements with the University of Manchester, Florida Atlantic University, and NYU Langone Health, and organizing collaborations with various other institutions worldwide.

Eliezer Shalev was among the founding staff of Guangdong Technion Israel Institute of Technology in Shantou, China, appointed in 2017 as the institution's first Pro-Vice Chancellor for Academic Affairs. In 2018, he succeeded Aaron Ciechanover as Vice Chancellor of Guangdong Technion, a position he held until 2021.

In 2022, Shalev was elected 8th President of Tel Hai Academic College.

=== Ministry of Health ===
In 2013, Eliezer Shalev was elected Chairman of Israel's National Council for Gynecology, Neonatology and Genetics at the Israeli Ministry of Health.

In 2017, the Ministry of Health presented Shalev with a Lifetime Achievement Award, recognizing “a health professional who has left a mark and has laid milestones in the healthcare system”.

== Research ==
Eliezer Shalev established a laboratory for basic fertility research at HaEmek Medical Center in 1994. He subsequently authored or co-authored 250 papers and book chapters in his areas of clinical interest, focusing on fertility and the molecular mechanism of human embryonic implantation and birth. In recent years, his focus has been the development of an ex vivo model of egg cells creation and fertilization. In 2013, his team succeeded in creating laboratory-grown human eggs from amniotic tissue.
