= Zadorov =

Zadorov (Russian: Задоров) is a Russian masculine surname, its feminine counterpart is Zadorova. It may refer to

- Nikita Zadorov (born 1995), Russian ice hockey defenseman
- Roman Zadorov, Ukrainian citizen, who is serving a life sentence in Israel
