= Nofey Golan High School =

High school in Katzrin, Golan Heights

Coordinates: 32.9905°N 35.6952°E

Nofey Golan high school
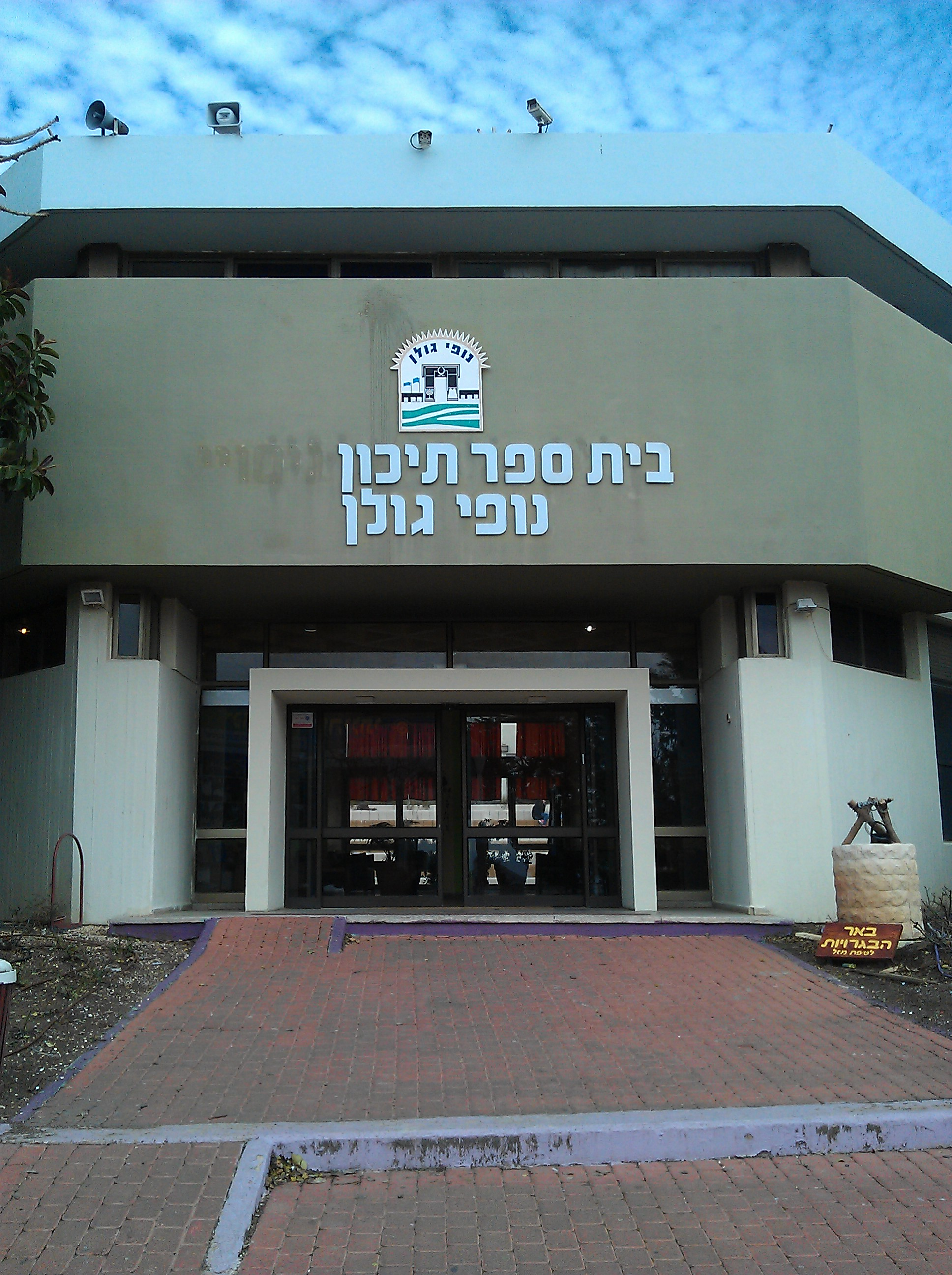
- Nofey Golan high school entrance.

Nofey Golan High School (Hebrew: נופי גולן), was founded in 1985 in the Israeli town of Katzrin in the Golan Heights. The school is the only high school in Katzrin, and the main high school in the whole Golan Heights region. Even though it is the main school in the Golan Heights it only has about 600 students.

The school is notable for the unsolved Murder of Tair Rada, a 13 year old student, which happened on the premises on 2006.

== Programs to encourage excellence ==
Nofey Golan gives the students a chance to participate in many programs, one of them is called "Atidim", and it helps exceptional students in the scientific field achieve a good Bagrut certificate and prepare them for the Atuda.

The second program the school offers is called "Brains Triangle", and its goal is to help 7th grade students learn special and interesting subjects.

The school also offers its students an option to learn at the Tel-Hai Academic College, while learning at the school. The students are sent once a week to learn among the adult students in the academy, and they participate in researches and get used to the academic life.

== Competitions ==
Nofey Golan school sends groups of students to many competitions, some of them are international.

- FIRST Robotics Competition - an international competition, in which the electronics class' students build robots according to the competition's terms. Every year they win high places in the competition in Israel.
- Documentary and featured movies competition- While learning in the Media class, the students apply their creativity to the movie competition. They often finish among the first places.

== Murder of Tair Rada ==
In 2006, in a bathroom stall in the Nofey Golan High School, Tair Rada, 13, was stabbed to death. The murder case gained public media attention in Israel, leading to several documentaries being released about it the following years. In 2010, four years after the slaying, 32-year-old Roman Zadorov, a repair contractor at the school, was found guilty of Rada's murder and sentenced to life imprisonment.

Rada's parents argued that their daughter's murder occurred as a result of negligence, after the school and local authorities hired contract workers, including Zadorov, without carrying out any prior checks on them. Those workers were then permitted to come into close contact with schoolchildren.

According to the indictment, on the day of Rada's murder, Zadorov left the school cellar where he was laying a new floor and came across Rada on a stairwell leading to a bathroom. Zadorov followed Rada into the bathroom and as she tried to close the stall door, he pushed it open and slit her throat. He then slashed her chest and arms before locking the bathroom from the inside and climbing out over Rada's body. He then climbed out of a window to flee the scene.

At the beginning of 2016, the case regained public interest as claims criticizing the liability of the forensic investigation of the case, strengthened. The claims, having existed since the actual accusation, called for a reopening of the case due to the alleged attempt of the police and the prosecution to convict Zadorov, a Russian immigrant, with the murder, in order to quickly lead to the closing of the case with a convicted murderer caught and imprisoned. That attempt, it was claimed, included deliberate incompetence and ignoring of evidence by the police. A 4-episode documentary television series named "Tsel Shel Emet" ("A Shadow of Truth" Hebrew: "צל של אמת"), portraying the flaws in Zadorov's conviction on one hand and discussing another potential explanation for the murder case on the other, was released in March 2016.
