= Murder of Tair Rada =

2006 murder of a teenage girl in Israel

The murder of Tair Rada (Note: Hebrew: תָּאִיר רָאדָה), a 13-year-old Israeli schoolgirl, was committed in 2006, in the girls' bathroom of her school in Katzrin. Roman Zdorov (Note: sometimes mistakenly spelled as Zadorov, Hebrew: רוֹמָן זְדוֹרוֹב), a Ukrainian national residing in Israel and working at the school as a floorer, was initially convicted of the murder and was sentenced to life imprisonment on September 14, 2010. His prosecution and conviction have been a source of controversy, receiving much media coverage, as well as being the focus of an Israeli documentary TV series called Shadow of Truth that has gained worldwide attention on Netflix. On August 26, 2021, Zdorov was released from prison to house arrest after many appeals.

On March 30, 2023 Zdorov was retried and was released as not guilty for the crime.

== Murder and initial investigation ==
In December 6, 2006, 13-year-old Tair Rada of Katzrin reportedly decided to skip the last period of that schoolday. She stayed outside in the schoolyard with friends for a while, before going back into the building to get a drink of water. She was last seen by several students going up a staircase leading to a mid-floor of 10th grade classes. Later that afternoon, when she failed to return home, her mother contacted the police, and a search began. That evening around 7 p.m., she was found murdered in a locked stall in the girls' bathroom—her throat slit twice and multiple additional cuts to her face, torso, and hands.

According to news reports from the evening of the murder, the police's initial estimate was that classmates were involved. This theory was dismissed soon thereafter. On the night of the murder, police detained a homeless person as a suspect. Three days later police detained the school gardener as well. Both were released two days later due to the fact they weren't at or near the school on that day and their alibis were confirmed.

On December 11, police detained and interrogated Zdorov. On December 19, two weeks after the murder, police announced in a press conference during prime time television, on the 8 p.m. evening news, that Roman Zdorov, a maintenance man, is held as the most likely suspect and that he had admitted and reenacted the murder. A day later, his attorney informed that he had recanted his confession.

The motive for the murder, as initially stated by the police, was insults hurled at Zdorov after he denied Tair's request for a cigarette. Both her family and friends, however, stated that not only did she not smoke, but she couldn't even stand the smell of cigarettes. They also stated that rude behaviour and cursing were very uncharacteristic of her. That motive was dropped. Police later claimed that the motive was sexual abuse Zdorov suffered by female classmates when he was an 8-year-old in Ukraine, which caused a rage fit after he suffered continuous pestering by the school's students during his work, but that could not be confirmed. No alternative motive for the murder was presented by police in the indictment.

== Indictment and trial ==
=== DNA ===
Initially, the Israel Police leaked to the press that DNA samples from the crime scene were matched with Zdorov's.

DNA and other "mounting evidence" were cited by the Judge when remanding Zdorov in custody. Later, the indictment was filed with no DNA evidence.

The State Prosecution explained the filing of the indictment with no DNA evidence or laboratory test results as follows:

The fact that the prosecution filed an indictment based on substantial evidence that exists implicating Zdorov without waiting for the U.S. lab results show there is sufficient evidence tying him to the murder, and the case isn't based wholly on that issue.

The DNA test results were inconclusive.

=== Shoe imprints ===
A shoe-print police expert by the name Yaron Shor claimed to have found additional bloody footprints on Tair Rada's jeans that matched Zdorov's Salamander shoes. British shoe imprint expert Dr. Guy Cooper testified in 2009 that the stains could not be considered Zdorov's shoe imprints, if shoe imprints at all. His testimony was dismissed by the Court.

FBI veteran, shoe imprint expert William Bodziak, also claimed in his 2013 testimony that these stains could not be determined to be Zdorov's shoe imprints, if shoe imprints at all. His testimony was also dismissed by the Court.

=== Hair ===
Hair discovered at the murder scene did not match Zdorov. Three pieces of hair found on Rada's body belonged to three different unknown people. Not all of the hair found in the crime scene were tested for DNA, since the police told the lab to stop all tests once Zdorov confessed.

== Students in Tair's high school ==
Media reports in the early days after the murder criticized the Israel Police for searching for the murderer through the vast areas of the Golan Heights and the Galilee, instead of focusing on suspects within the school building itself.

One of the students later testified in Court that she saw under the bathroom stall, where the murder was committed, Tair's Puma shoes, youth-size Allstar shoes and blood.

A long list of students went through the bathroom around the time of the murder, while Tair apparently struggled with the murderers, and some of them even noticed highly suspicious circumstances.

Tair's mother stated on various occasions that she didn't believe that Zdorov was the murderer, and that she believed that the true murderers were "from Tair's world". She alluded that the murderers were high school students whom she believed to be members of a Satanic cult.

In May 2016, an attorney representing two of the female students, Nufar Ben David and Lee Lahyani issued a letter to leaders of Roman Zdorov's support groups a "warning prior to filing a lawsuit" letter, demanding an apology, adequate monetary compensation, and a promise to cease defamatory publication. In response, recipients of the demands and threat published on June 4, 2016 a statement, rejecting the demands. Later that year, slander lawsuits were filed.

== Judicial process ==
Trial commenced in January 2007 with the filing of the indictment in the Nazareth District Court, followed by the September 2010 initial conviction, October 2010 filing of Zdorov's appeal in the Supreme Court of Israel, March 2013 remand to the Nazareth District Court for additional review of the evidence, and February 2014 supplemental judgment by the Nazareth District Court—again convicting Zdorov. On December 23, 2015, the Israeli Supreme Court denied Zdorov's appeal by a 2 to 1 decision of a panel of three justices. Zdorov's team immediately asked for a new hearing by an expanded panel.

No signed confession was filed with the indictment, Zdorov having recanted both his confessions and refused to sign his second one. However, police officers testified that he confessed in investigation that he had committed the murder. No motive for the murder was provided in the indictment.

The 456 page, September 2010 conviction by a three-judge panel headed by Judge Yitzhak Cohen—then Presiding Judge of the Nazareth District Court—was read out in a dramatic open court hearing. It stated that there was no doubt that Zdorov was the murderer, and that his testimony was full of lies and manipulations. Therefore, Zdorov was further convicted on obstruction of a police investigation. The lack of any motive for the murder was found no object by the judges.

In March 2013, the Supreme Court of Israel remanded the case back to the Nazareth District Court for rehearing of evidence by expert witnesses, as requested by Zdorov's lawyers:

- William Bodziak, a world-renowned forensics expert—regarding the footprint found on the clothes of the murdered girl, and
- Dr. Maya Forman-Reznik, a pathologist—regarding the murder weapon and the trauma injuries found on her head.

Key evidence, relating to the murder knife and shoe imprints, key issues in this case, were not settled. In February 2014, the Nazareth District Court returned a supplemental judgment, again convicting Zdorov. The Nazareth District Court rejected the testimony of the defense expert about the kind of knife used in the murder, and called the assertion that it was not possible to identify the bloody shoe print "embarrassing and fundamentally flawed."

The December 23, 2015 denial of the appeal by the Supreme Court of Israel was rendered by a 2:1 split panel. The Jerusalem Post summed up the controversy and the Supreme Court's decision as follows:

The case captivated the media and public. It was a tragic, small-town murder that, from the beginning, was dogged by rumors, including that local teenagers had killed Rada and the town or teachers had covered it up, finding an easy fall guy in Zdorov, an immigrant from the former Soviet Union. The 300-page majority opinion upholding the conviction on Wednesday, which included justices Isaac Amit and Zvi Zylbertal, found three major grounds for its decision, despite the disputes over the shoe prints and the knife. Aspects of Zdorov's confession while under arrest to a confidential informant, of his confession to interrogators and his participation in reenacting aspects of the crime were decisive, wrote the court.

The Supreme Court's denial of the appeal failed to settle the case. Zadorov's team immediately asked for a new hearing by an expanded panel.

The Zdorov case raised the issue of prosecutorial misconduct, lack of oversight of the State Prosecution, false convictions in general, and reluctance of the Israeli courts to reverse false convictions.

On May 11, 2021, the Supreme Court ordered a retrial for Zdorov. In his final ruling as a Supreme Court justice, Hanan Melcer said that based on the evidence presented by his attorneys, there was sufficient reasonable doubt to exonerate Zdorov.

On March 30, 2023, Roman Zadorov was exonerated of the murder. This decision came after 2 Supreme Court judges ruled 2-1 that there is "reasonable doubt" Zadorov is the culprit.

== Judge Yitzhak Cohen affair ==
By September 2014, Presiding Judge Yitzhak Cohen of the Nazareth District Court, who twice convicted Zdorov, left on vacation, and by November 2014 he resigned, after police recommended his prosecution for sexual harassment of a female attorney in his chambers.

In parallel, Justice Minister Livni ordered a probe to determine whether Moshe Lador and other highly placed figures attempted to cover up to the sexual harassment.

Media later reported that Attorney General Yehuda Weinstein instructed Commissioner of Prosecutorial Oversight Judge (ret) Hila Gerstel to stop the cover-up investigation.

== Conduct of the State Prosecution, Dr. Forman and Dr. Kugel affairs ==
Regarding the Zdorov affair, Law Professor Mordechai Kremnitzer wrote in October 2014: "Conduct of the prosecution is scary... the State Prosecution is not seeking the truth... the justice system is mostly busy protecting itself..." His comments were published in the wake of the Tel-Aviv Labor Court judgment in the lawsuit of senior forensic medical expert Dr. Maya Forman against the State of Israel, Ministry of Health and others. Her case became an entirely separate scandal, which was described by Israeli media as persecution, settlement of accounts, and a retaliation campaign by Chief State Prosecutor Shai Nitzan against Dr. Forman for her professional, honest, expert testimony in the Zdorov affair.

The State Prosecution first fought to prevent Dr. Forman from testifying in the Nazareth court in Roman Zdorov's case. Dr. Forman eventually testified for Zdorov in the Nazareth District Court that the murder was committed using a serrated knife, not a smooth-edged Japanese knife.

In its February 2014 supplemental judgment the Nazareth District Court not only rejected Dr. Forman's expert testimony, but also heavily criticized her professional conduct. In the aftermath, Chief State Prosecutor Shai Nitzan, who claimed that he was backed by Attorney General Yehuda Weinstein, tried to impose professional restrictions on Dr. Forman and to prohibit her from further appearances in courts as an expert witness – effectively crippling her professional employment.

The labor dispute became a scandal in its own sake, with the Israeli Medical Association joining as a friend of the court, strongly supporting Dr. Forman. Moreover, while the Israeli Ministry of Health was named Defendant in the labor dispute, Minister of Health Yael German wrote a public letter to the Attorney General, stating that his conduct against Dr. Forman "lacks legal foundation and carries overarching and dangerous implications... blatant violation of Human Rights, the fundamentals of law and justice..."

The case in the Tel-Aviv Labor Court then generated another separate scandal, when the State Prosecution tried to solicit an affidavit in support of its position from another senior forensic medical expert in the State Forensic Institute, Dr. Hen Kugel. Dr. Kugel provided the State Prosecution a curve-ball affidavit, which for the first time disclosed that he also supported Dr. Forman's professional opinion that the murder was committed using a serrated knife. Dr. Kugel never testified in the Nazareth District Court trial. However, the State Prosecution made false representations to the Court, suggesting that Kugel supported the Prosecution's position regarding the knife. It was even relied upon in the Conviction. Dr. Kugel's affidavit in the Tel-Aviv Labor Court also strongly objected to any professional restrictions on an expert, i.e., Dr. Forman, who provided an honest professional opinion in court, as a dangerous precedent.

The State Prosecution first tried to gag Dr. Kugel, and prevent his affidavit from being filed. Then, the State Prosecution tried to heavily edit his affidavit. Eventually, Dr. Kugel's affidavit was filed, unmodified, both in the Tel-Aviv Labor Court and in Zdorov's appeal in the Supreme Court. Furthermore, both the original affidavit and the edited affidavit, proposed by the State Prosecution, were published, causing a new wave of criticism against the State Prosecution: Experts raised concerns that the Prosecution's conduct relative to Dr. Kugel's affidavit amounted to tampering with a witness.

In the wake of Dr. Forman victory in the Tel-Aviv Labor Court, senior law professor and former dean of the Hebrew University Law School Yoav Dotan nicknamed Forman "Dr. Forman and Mr. Nitzan", referencing the literary characters Dr. Jekyll and Mr. Hyde. In his opinion article, Prof Dotan emphasized the wider implications of the entire affair, which undermined due process. Prof Dotan also criticized the extreme concentration of power by the State Prosecution and its lack of accountability, supporting the ongoing calls for a major reform in the offices of Attorney General and Chief State Prosecutor.

The Dr. Forman and Dr. Kugel scandals expanded into a heated debate over integrity, lack of accountability for wrongdoing, and resistance of the State Prosecution to any civilian oversight.

In December 2015, Commissioner of Prosecutorial Oversight, Judge (ret) Hila Gerstel, issued a report, effectively finding that the State Prosecution engaged in tampering with witnesses and perverting/obstruction of justice. Chief State Prosecutor Shai Nitzan objected to Gerstel's report, claiming that Gerstel overstepped her authority.

Attorney General Yehuda Weinstein issued an opinion supporting the State's right to change officials' affidavits.

Also in December 2015, Dr. Hen Kugel, by then Director of the State Forensic Institute, stated in an interview with media: "I am intimidated by the State Prosecution".

The case also raised again the issue of the lack of integrity in the State Forensic Medical Institute before Dr. Forman and Dr. Kugel joined it. Prof Sangero wrote: "For decades the Israel Police and the State Prosecution dominated the Institute. Monopoly of police and the prosecution over scientific evidence has been established, and the evidence has been used almost exclusively to support convictions."

Partly in the wake of the Dr. Forman and Dr. Kugel affairs, Commissioner of Prosecutorial Oversight Judge (ret) Hila Gerstel conducted a review of the relationships between the State Prosecution and the State Forensic Institute, and generated a report, which was due for publication in April 2016. However, in late March 2016, 11 senior prosecutors filed a petition with the Supreme Court, asking to prohibit the publication of the report, claiming that it would "damage their reputation".

Following Commissioner Gerstel's report, regarding conduct of the State Prosecution, relative to the Dr. Kugel affidavit, attempt was made to conduct an ethics complaint procedure against three senior State Prosecution attorneys by the Israel Bar Association. In May 2016, Attorney Avichai Mandelblit (who by then replaced Yehuda Weinstein in that office) used his authority and blocked the Bar complaint process.

== State Prosecutors' strike, Commissioner of Prosecutorial Oversight resignation ==
Commissioner of Prosecutorial Oversight, Judge (ret) Hila Gerstel's review of conduct of the State Prosecution, related to the Zdorov affair, generated ever growing tension between her and the State Prosecution. In December 2015, Commissioner Gerstel issued a letter, which was described by media "rare in its severity", stating that Chief State Prosecutor "is not saying the truth", and that his report to the Attorney General, regarding the Dr. Forman affair was full of falsifications and untruths.

On April 4, 2016, a few days after filing the petition to block the publication of Commissioner Gerstel's report regarding the State Prosecution-Forensic Institute relationships, the State Prosecutors' Union declared a strike for an indefinite period, protesting the authority of Commissioner Gerstlel to oversee their conduct.

On April 18, 2016, facing the State Prosecutors' strike and the petition, and realizing that she had no sufficient backing from Attorney General Yehuda Weinstein and Justice Minister Ayelet Shaked, Commissioner Gerstel resigned. In June 2016, Chair of the State Prosecutors' Union referred in an interview to Commissioner Gerstel as "a pirate".

In an early June 2016 appearance before the Knesset's Constitution, Law, and Justice Committee in a hearing regarding the future of the Commissioner of Prosecutorial Oversight, and referring also to Attorney General Mandelblit's blocking of the Israel Bar Association review of conduct of senior State Prosecutors, relative to the attempt to pervert Dr. Kugel's affidavit, senior law professor and former Justice Minister Daniel Friedman stated in a June 2016 "The Attorney General cannot gag the entire State, and not let anybody voice an opinion".

== Parents, public, and media ==
The victim's mother did not believe that Zdorov is the murderer. In early 2007 she filed a petition with the Israeli Supreme Court, asking for re-opening of the murder investigation. The petition was summarily denied.

In 2010, Tair's mother told media: "As far as I'm concerned, anything to do with the court, the prosecution and the police is pure delinquency. They abandoned my daughter." On various other occasions she explicitly stated that she believed that her daughter was killed by students in the school who were members of a Satanic cult.

In 2011, investigators Haim Sadovsky and Doron Beldinger filed a petition with the Supreme Court, also asking that the Supreme Court mandate re-opening of the police investigation in this case. Their petition was also denied.

In December 2014, a group of activists, who closely followed the case, filed with the Attorney General criminal complaints against the Israel Police investigation team for obstruction of the investigation and fabrication of evidence, and separately against the State Prosecution team - for fraud in the court.

In December 2015 demonstrations were held in Tel-Aviv central square in support of justice for Roman Zdorov and renewed investigation of Tair Rada's murder. An international Avaaz petition was launched, calling upon Israeli President Rivlin to pardon on commute Zdorov's sentence. The petition was endorsed by notable US Rabbi Michael Lerner (rabbi), by notable US public intellectual Prof Noam Chomsky, and by veteran FBI agent and whistle-blower Coleen Rowley.

In a mid January 2016 Knesset oversight committee hearing it was exposed that the Israel Police obtained a court decree and tried to confiscate all materials obtained by Channel 2 investigative journalism program Uvda regarding misconduct in the State Forensic Institute. According to Uvda journalist Omri Essenheim, a policeman had appeared in their editorial offices and demanded to obtain any materials that had been collected as part of their investigative journalism work relative to conduct of the State Forensic Institute. The editorial staff refused to comply with police demands. Mr. Essenheim added: "In the Zdorov affair the State Prosecution acted contrary to its stated mission of seeking the truth."

== Shadow of Truth ==
In early 2016, a four-part documentary TV series was aired in Israel, called Shadow of Truth, reviewing the Tair Rada murder/Roman Zdorov conviction affair. It caused a major media uproar, raising many doubts regarding Zdorov's conviction and pointing at many flaws in his investigation and trial. The fourth episode revealed a never-heard-before testimony of a man (referred to in the series as A.H.), who told the police in 2012 that his ex-girlfriend had confessed to him on the day of the murder, and even showed him a knife and clothes soaked in blood. Following his testimony, his ex-girlfriend (referred to as A.K.) was then arrested by police and investigated under suspicion of murder. While she was in house arrest, she left her home and tried to kill someone, and was subsequently sent to a psychiatric hospital without being further interrogated about her involvement in the Rada case. Along with his own lawyer and Zdorov's public defender, who are also interviewed in the episode, A.H. claims that the investigation had been whitewashed. The Israeli State Attorney, Supreme Court and Justice Ministry have all rejected A.H. claims and found his testimony to be unrealiable and "an attempt to frame his former lover".

After the series aired, Chief State Prosecutor Shai Nitzan stated in a widely reported public appearance that the series is "a danger to democracy". The series' creators responded by saying "He who thinks that freedom of speech endangers democracy, is a danger to it himself". In January 2017, Netflix bought the rights to the series, making it available in over 190 countries around the world.

Shadow of Truth was later re-released in the UK by BBC. A fifth and final episode was aired in July 2023 following the retrial and subsequent acquittal of Zdorov.
