= Kisrin =

Kisrin or Ḳisrin may refer to one of the following:

- Caesarea Maritima
- Caesarea Philippi
- Katzrin
