= David Mintz (judge) =

Israeli jurist (born 1959)

- דָּוִד מִינְץ
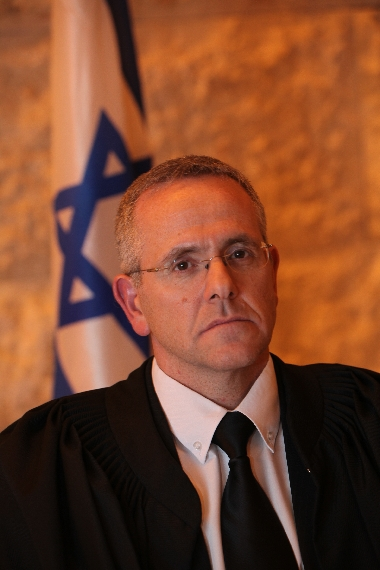
- David Mintz

Justice of the Supreme Court of Israel
- Incumbent
- Assumed office 13 June 2017

Personal details
- Born: May 8, 1959 (age 67) United Kingdom
- Education: Hebrew University of Jerusalem (LLB)

David Mintz (Hebrew: דָּוִד מִינְץ; born 8 May 1959) is a British-Israeli jurist who has served as a justice of the Supreme Court of Israel since 2017. He is considered a conservative justice. In March 2025 he was involved in a controversial ruling of the Supreme Court on the matter of allowing aid in Gaza, amidst the Gaza war.

== Early life and education ==
Mintz was born in the United Kingdom to a Jewish family, and emigrated to Israel with his family in 1970. He studied at the Midrashiat Noam religious high school in Pardes Hanna-Karkur from 1974 to 1977. After graduating high school in 1977, he participated in the hesder program, which combines advanced religious studies with military service in the Israel Defense Forces, serving in the Armored Corps and studying at Yeshivat Har Etzion in Alon Shvut. He was discharged from active service in 1982 and began studying law at the Hebrew University of Jerusalem in 1983 and graduated with a Bachelor of Laws in 1986. During his studies, he served as a research assistant to professors Eliav Sochetman and Berachyahu Lifschitz. In 1986, he clerked for Judge Yehuda Weiss, who was President of the Jerusalem District Court, and at the Supreme Court. In 1987, he interned at a law firm in Jerusalem, and studied for ordination as a rabbi at the Ariel Institute. Later, when he was already a judge, Mintz completed graduate studies in law at the Hebrew University of Jerusalem, earning a Master of Laws in 2008 and a Doctor of Philosophy in law in 2017.

Mintz also continued to serve as an officer in the military reserves, serving as a platoon commander, a deputy company commander, and a company commander. He was due to become a battalion commander in 1996 but was unable to fulfill this role due to having been appointed a judge, but continued to serve as a reserve officer in his armored division until 2010.

== Legal career ==
Mintz was admitted to the Israel Bar Association in 1987, and practiced law as an attorney from 1987 to 1998, first as an associate and then as a partner in an independent law firm. In 1998, he was appointed a judge on the Jerusalem Magistrate's Court. In 2009, he was appointed registrar and acting judge at the Jerusalem District Court. He was appointed to be a judge on the Jerusalem District Court in 2011. He also serves as a lecturer on insolvency law at the Hebrew University of Jerusalem.

In February 2017, he was selected to serve on the Supreme Court by the Judicial Selection Committee. He assumed the position in June 2017, replacing Zvi Zylbertal.

== Controversial rulings ==
In March 2025 he ruled that "The State of Israel is in the midst of a mitzvah war in the full sense of the word", where there was no obligation to "allow the provision of extensive and unlimited aid", drawing criticism of introducing religious language in a legal ruling. This ruling was done during the Gaza war, contributing to the state of Israel keeping its alleged policy of not allowing food in Gaza amidst famine being imminent.

== Personal life ==
Mintz lives in Dolev, an Israeli settlement in the West Bank. He is married to Varda and has five children.
