= Ohalo College =

Israeli teachers colleges

- מכללת אוהלו
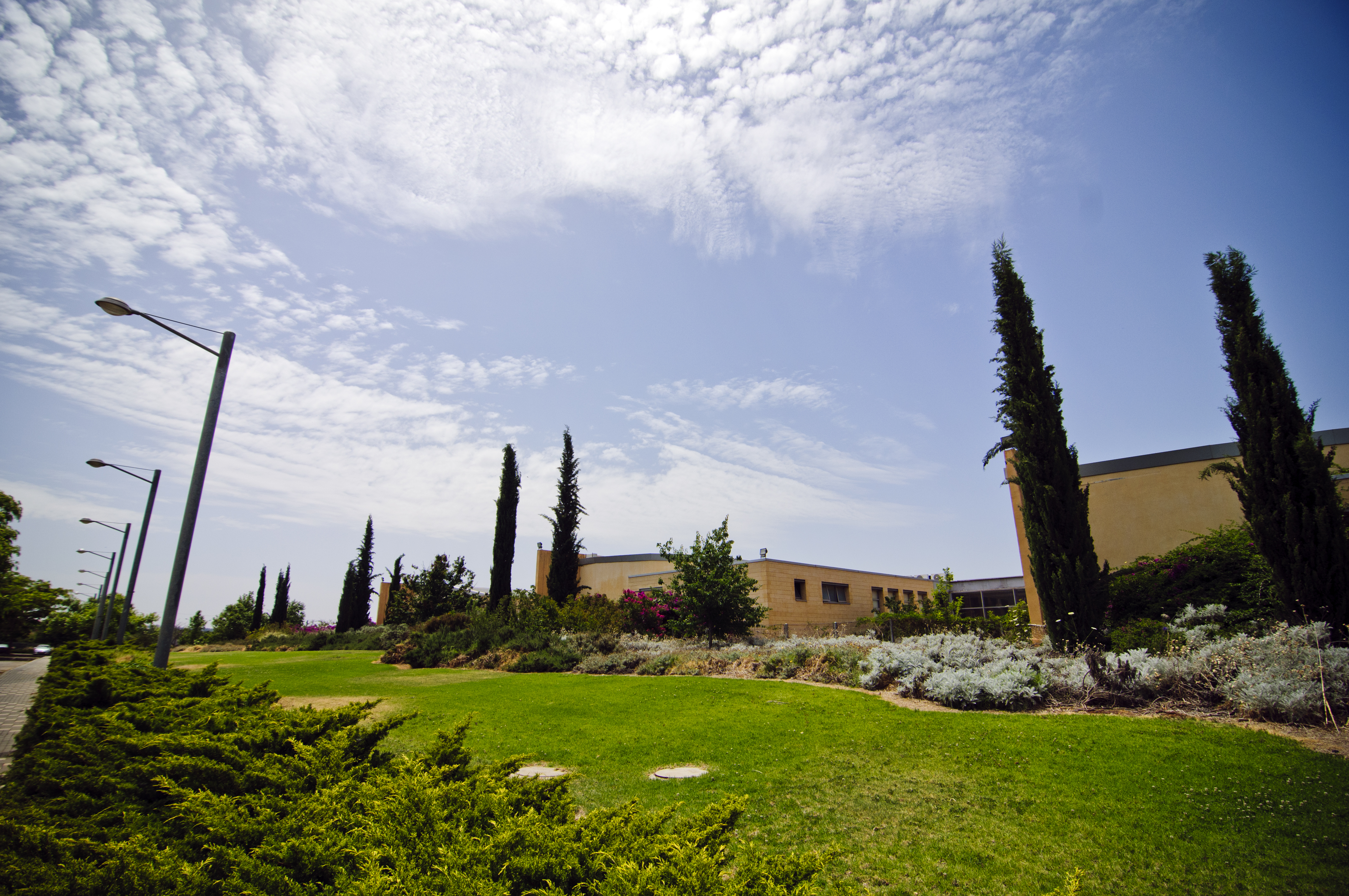
- Motto: אוהלו - מרכז אקדמי פורץ דרך המעצב את דור העתיד
- Motto in English: Ohalo College is a pioneering academic center, shaping and empowering future generations
- Type: Teacher training college
- Established: 1964
- Parent institution: Tel-Hai University
- President: Eitan Simon
- Faculty: c. 100
- Administrative staff: c. 30
- Students: c. 2000
- Location: Katzrin, Golan Heights; 32°59′22.45″N 35°41′48.21″E
- Website: www.ohalo.ac.il

Ohalo College (Hebrew: מכללת אוהלו, romanized: Mikhlelet Ohalo), also known as the Ohalo College of Education (Hebrew: מכללת אוהלו לחינוך, romanized: Mikhlelet Ohalo LeKhinukh), is an Israeli leading institution that specializes in teachers' and kindergarten teachers' training toward a B.Ed. degree in various disciplines, including biology, mathematics, English, special education, Jewish Studies, and physical education, as well as toward an M.Ed. degree in Management and Organizational of Education systems. The college currently has 2,500 learners, of which 60% are students in the Education and Teaching professions, while the rest are in continuing education programs, advanced studies, professional development and external studies. Since 1998 it has been located in the Israeli-occupied Golan Heights.

== History ==
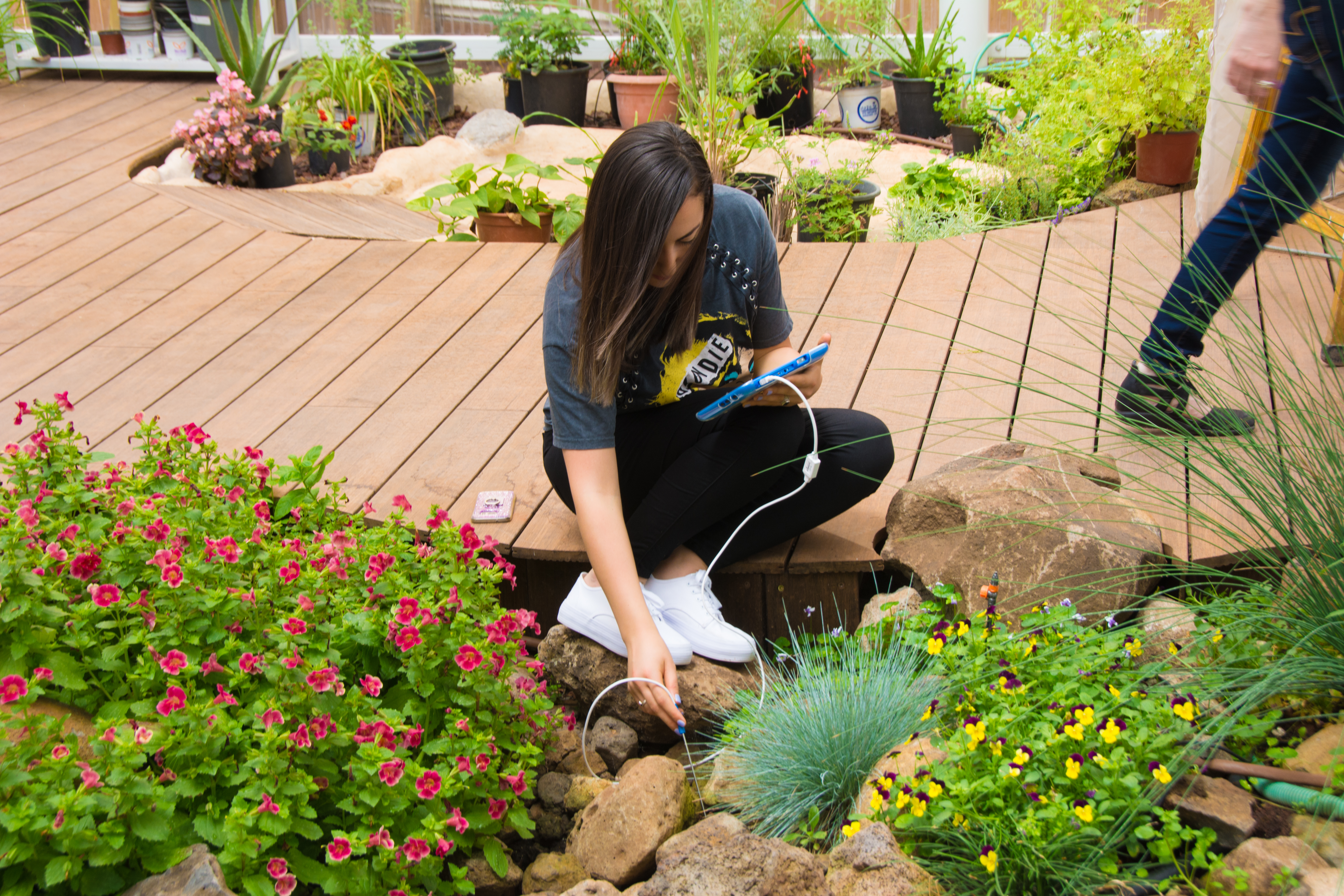
Ohalo biophilic learning space

Ohalo College was established in 1964 in memory of Berl Katznelson by the Ministry of Education and the Centre of Education and Culture of the Histadrut as a teacher training college near Kvutzat Kinneret by the Sea of Galilee. Since its establishment, the college has developed and has offered new four-year teacher training courses to include physical education and special education. In 1998 it moved to its current location in the Israeli settlement of Katzrin in the Israeli-occupied Golan Heights, and since then students of the college are able to specialise in general education combined with special education. Since 2000 the college has offered B.Ed. courses, and from 2001 it has been recognised as an institution of higher education.

== Courses ==
Currently the college offers B.Ed. courses as well as continuing education courses. There is a proposal to introduce Master of Education courses as well in the future depending on the approval of the Council for Higher Education. The current tracks and units of study are aimed at qualifying teachers for all age groups from birth to the twelfth grade in high schools (age 18). The tracks and units are as follows:

- Early Years – from birth to 2nd grade in primary school. Specialisations in this track are music and movement, Judaism, natural sciences, and special education.
- Primary School – from 3rd to 6th grade. Specialisations in this track are English language, Judaism, sciences and special education.
- The Green Track – Sciences and Environment. This track is divided to two: primary school (1st-6th grade) teachers with a specialisation in sciences, and middle school (7th and 8th grades) teachers with a specialisation in biology and environmental studies. The emphasis in this track is on environmental preservation and sensitivity to the values of nature. Postgraduate students of this track can also become qualified tour guides.
- Physical Education – from kindergarten to 12th grade in high school. Specialisations in this track are physical education for adults, maritime sports, outdoor sportive activities, and health promotion.
- State-Religious Education. Students in this unit take courses in Judaism and one specialisation from the following choices: early years, primary school education, biology and environmental studies for middle school, physical education, and special education.
- Physical Trainers. This vocational unit qualifies trainers and instructors in various physical education and sportive disciplines.
- Continuing Education and Professional Development. In this unit qualified teachers with a certificate in education continue to study for a B.Ed. degree in any of the tracks offered. Other academics who do not hold any qualification in education continue to study to gain a certificate in education in any of the tracks offered.
- Mechina. This pre-academic programme in the college operates under the sponsorship and supervision of the Association for Education Progress of the Ministry of Education in order to prepare post-high school youth for academic studies.
- “Excellent for Teaching”. This unique programme of the college grants students who have excellent leading skills and study abilities with financial and curricular privileges in order to nourish the excellence of educational leadership in the education system in Israel.

== Facilities ==
The college offers a range of facilities and services:

- Modern academic library equipped with advanced technology
- Pedagogical resources centre
- Laboratories dedicated to teaching and research in science studies, physiology, bio-mechanics and physical education.
- Computer centre used for teaching
- Medical centre used for training and for testing physical abilities
- Athletic stadium

== International partnerships ==
Every year since the late 80s Ohalo College exchanges student delegations with Alice Salomon college of Hanover, Germany, in order to bring together Israeli and German youths. The main aim of the project is to create a dialogue on Holocaust issues. In addition, the German youth is exposed to the relations between the Arab and Jewish sectors in Israel.

== Department of English ==
English performance at Ohalo, 2010

Ohalo college currently offers a B.Ed. degree with a concentration on English Teaching. Starting in 2008, the English Department initiated two significant changes. It submitted a program to the Israeli Ministry of Education for a complete B.Ed. program in English and has almost doubled the number of courses that it teaches. The department introduced new courses in Media, Linguistics, Culture and Literature and hired new faculty members who are well published scholars and experts on pedagogy, literary and cultural theory, linguistics and almost any other conceivable facet of English Studies.

Ohalo College provides the northern region in Israel with a four-year program in English Culture, Literature, Media, and other facets of English Studies. The English department is also a local provider of English cultural events to the region, hosting a poetry reading in April 2010.
