= Shadow of Truth =

2017 Israeli documentary TV series

- Genre: Documentary
- Written by: Ari Pines; Yotam Guendelman
- Directed by: Ari Pines; Yotam Guendelman
- Theme music composer: Ahuva Ozeri
- Country of origin: Israel
- Original languages: Hebrew & Russian
- No. of seasons: 1
- No. of episodes: 5

Production
- Producers: Mika Timor, Ben Giladi and Yotam Guendelman
- Cinematography: Eitan Hatuka
- Editor: Gal Goffer
- Running time: 31–66 minutes
- Production company: EGG Films

Original release
- Network: Netflix
- Release: January 27, 2017 – present

Shadow of Truth is a true-crime Israeli documentary television series that was created by directors Yotam Guendelman and Ari Pines, and producer Mika Timor. The series was produced by Timor, Guendelman and Ben Giladi through their EGG Films and premiered on Israeli channel HOT8 in March 2016. It was subsequently sold by the producers to Netflix for worldwide distribution and was released with subtitles in over 190 countries on January 27, 2017. In 2018, the series was labeled as one of the most-watched true-crime shows on Netflix.

The series has received positive reviews, and won several awards, including the 2017 Israeli Academy Television Awards for best documentary series, best editing and best visual-design and best special effects.

In 2019, the creators of the show completed a follow-up series titled Coastal Road Killer, which premiered that same year in DOC NYC.

== Subject matter ==
The series follows the 2006 murder case of Tair Rada, a 13-year-old Israeli girl whose body was found in a school bathroom, and the subsequent arrest and trial of Roman Zadorov, a Ukrainian immigrant who had worked at the school. The series is divided into four episodes, each one exploring a different aspect of the case. The first episode focuses on the narrative of the police and prosecution, according to which Zadorov is guilty. The second episode centers on Zadorov's defense team and the deconstruction of his confession. The third episode deals with a widespread conspiracy theory spurred by social media, which points at Tair's classmates as the real culprits. The fourth episode reveals a never-heard-before testimony of a man (referred to in the series as A.H.), who told the police in 2012 that his ex-girlfriend had confessed the murder to him on the very day it happened. The Israeli State Attorney, Supreme Court and Justice Ministry have all rejected A.H.'s claims and found his testimony to be unreliable and "an attempt to frame his former lover".

== Reception ==
Shadow of Truth caused a major media storm and was at the center of public debate for months after being aired, raising many doubts concerning Zadorov's conviction while also exposing flaws in the criminal justice system as a whole. Many critics hailed it as one of the most important shows in Israeli history, both for its in-depth investigative journalism and its high production value and strong artistic and cinematic qualities, often comparing it to the American documentary series Making a Murderer which was released shortly before.

Shadow of Truth created a stir within the Israeli judicial system, which resulted in harsh criticism from the President of the Supreme Court, Miriam Naor, as well as the Israeli State Attorney, Shai Nitzan, who called the series during a press conference "a danger to democracy." The series' creators responded by saying, "He who thinks that freedom of speech endangers democracy, is a danger to it himself."
