= Katzrin ancient village and synagogue =

Museum and archaeological site in the Golan Heights

Ancient Katzrin Synagogue
- קצרין העתיקה (Hebrew)
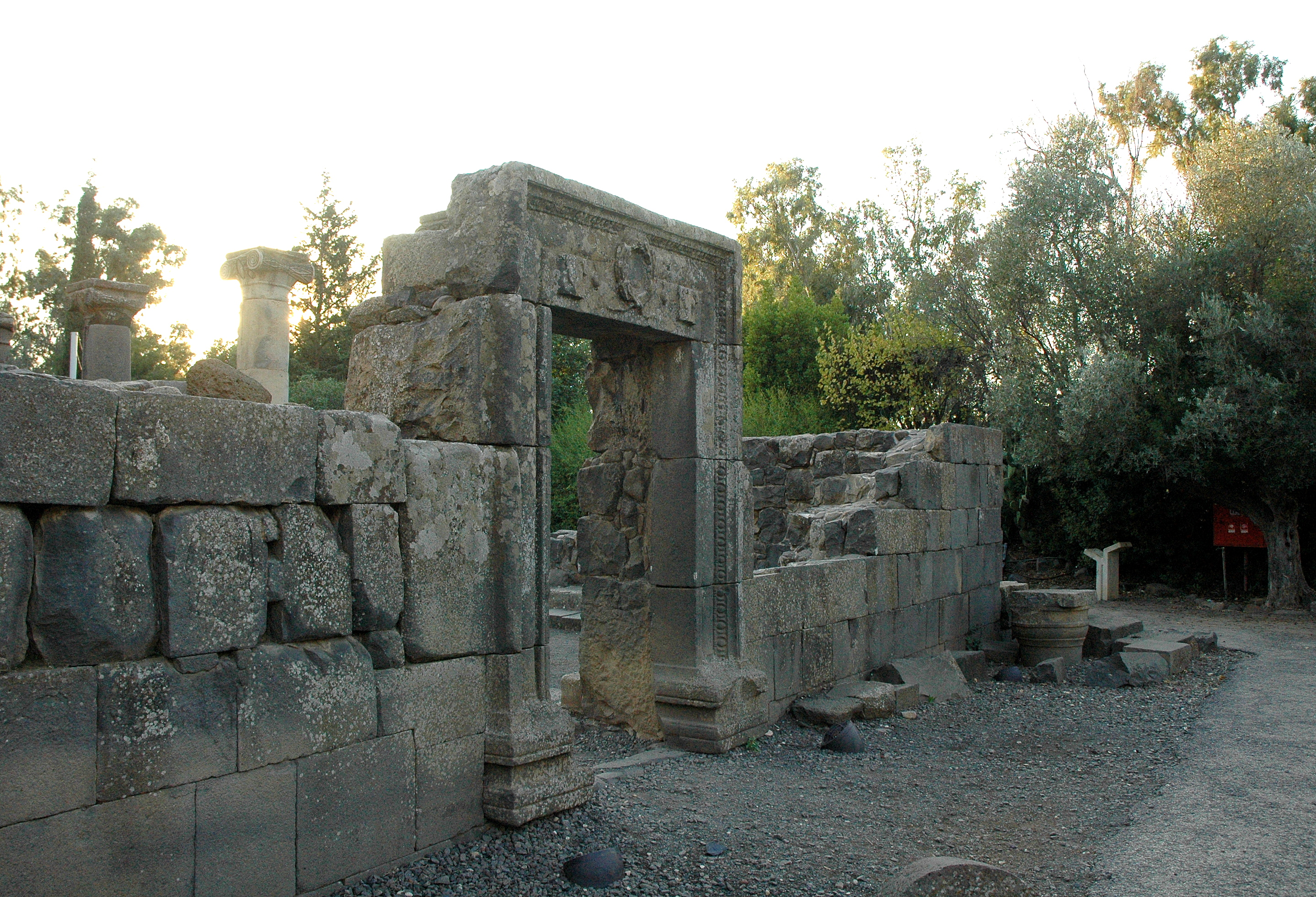
- Entrance to the former ancient synagogue

- Location of the former ancient synagogue in the Golan Heights

Religion
- Affiliation: Judaism (former)
- Ecclesiastical or organisational status: Ancient synagogue; Jewish museum; Archaeological site
- Status: Ruins; (partially rebuilt for educational purposes)

Location
- Location: Katzrin, Golan Heights
- Grid position: 215/266 PAL
- Administration: Occupied by Israel since 1967
- Coordinates: 32°59′31″N 35°41′28″E

Architecture
- Style: Byzantine architecture
- Completed: c. 6th-century CE

History
- Abandoned: 8th century CE

Site notes
- Public access: Yes (as "Ancient Katzrin Park")

The Katzrin ancient village and synagogue (Hebrew: קצרין העתיקה) is an open-air museum located in the Golan Heights on the outskirts of the Israeli settlement of Katzrin on the depopulated Syrian village of Kisrin. It features the partially reconstructed remains of a Talmudic village from the 4th-8th century CE, that is: mainly from the Byzantine period, but starting from the Late Roman and extending into the Early Muslim era (Rashidun and Umayyad periods), or in Jewish historiography, the Talmudic period.

== History, archaeological site and park ==
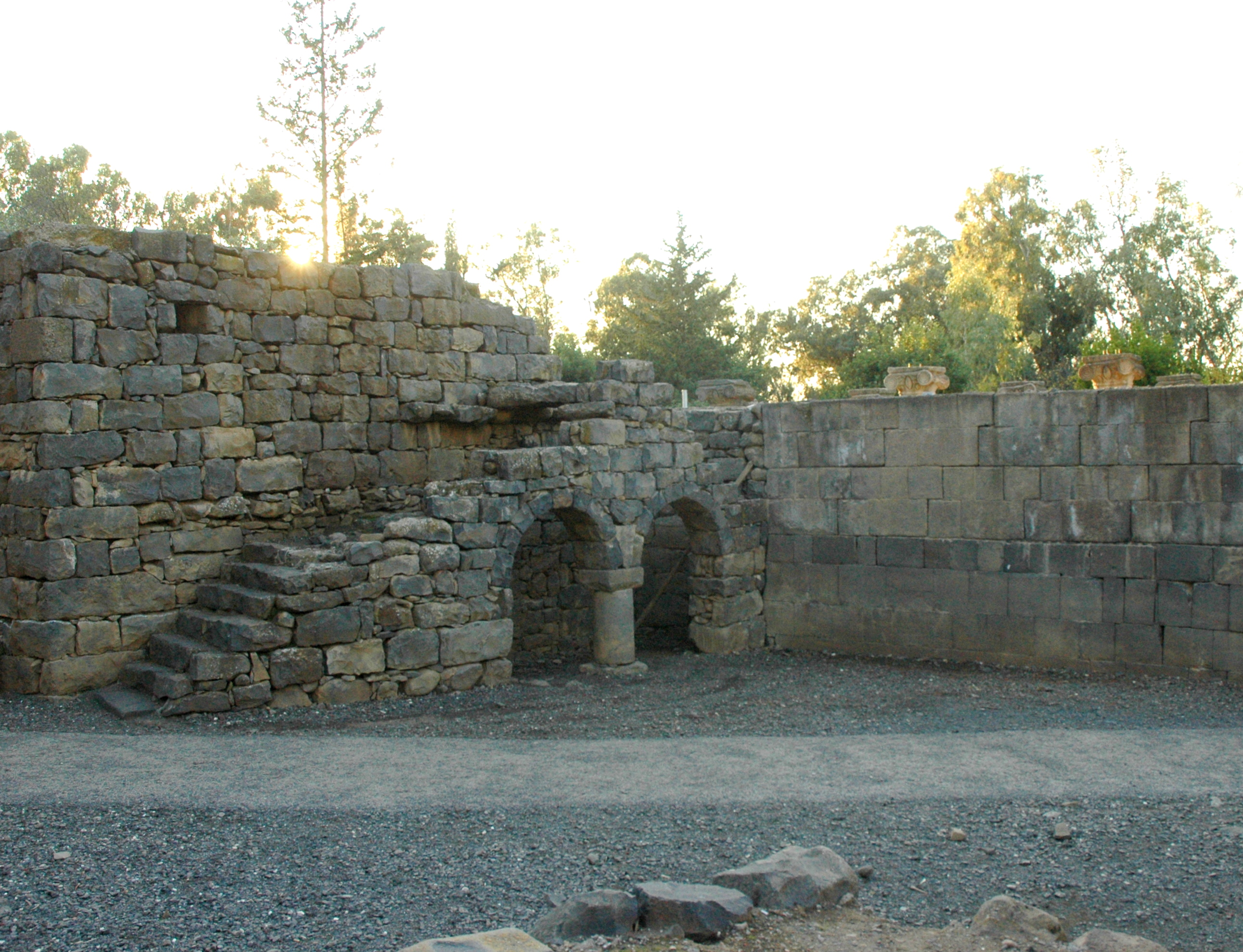
Reconstructed arches leaning against the ashlar-built synagogue (on the right)

The site was inhabited during the Middle Bronze Age, Iron II, Late Roman, Early Islamic, Mamluk, and modern era.

The ancient Jewish farming village of Katzrin was built around a spring, which still flowed until recently. Above-ground ruins already existed at the site, and archaeological excavations have increased the number of accessible ancient buildings. An ancient synagogue was discovered in 1967 and excavated between 1971 and 1984. Other parts of the village were excavated beginning in 1983. Some of the buildings have been reconstructed on their ancient foundations and furnished with replicas of household goods and tools. An ancient wine press and olive press have also been made functional with new ropes and beams. Costumed guides demonstrate and explain in Hebrew and English construction methods, agricultural and manufacturing processes.

=== Synagogue ===
The Katzrin Synagogue was built in the 6th century CE atop a more modest, probably late-4th-century synagogue. It was built with an architectural style characteristic to southern Syria, but not used in Palestine during that period. Fragments of a mosaic floor have been found. The town and synagogue were destroyed by the catastrophic 749 earthquake, and Katzrin was abandoned. In the Mamluk period, part of the standing ruin was roofed and used as a mosque.

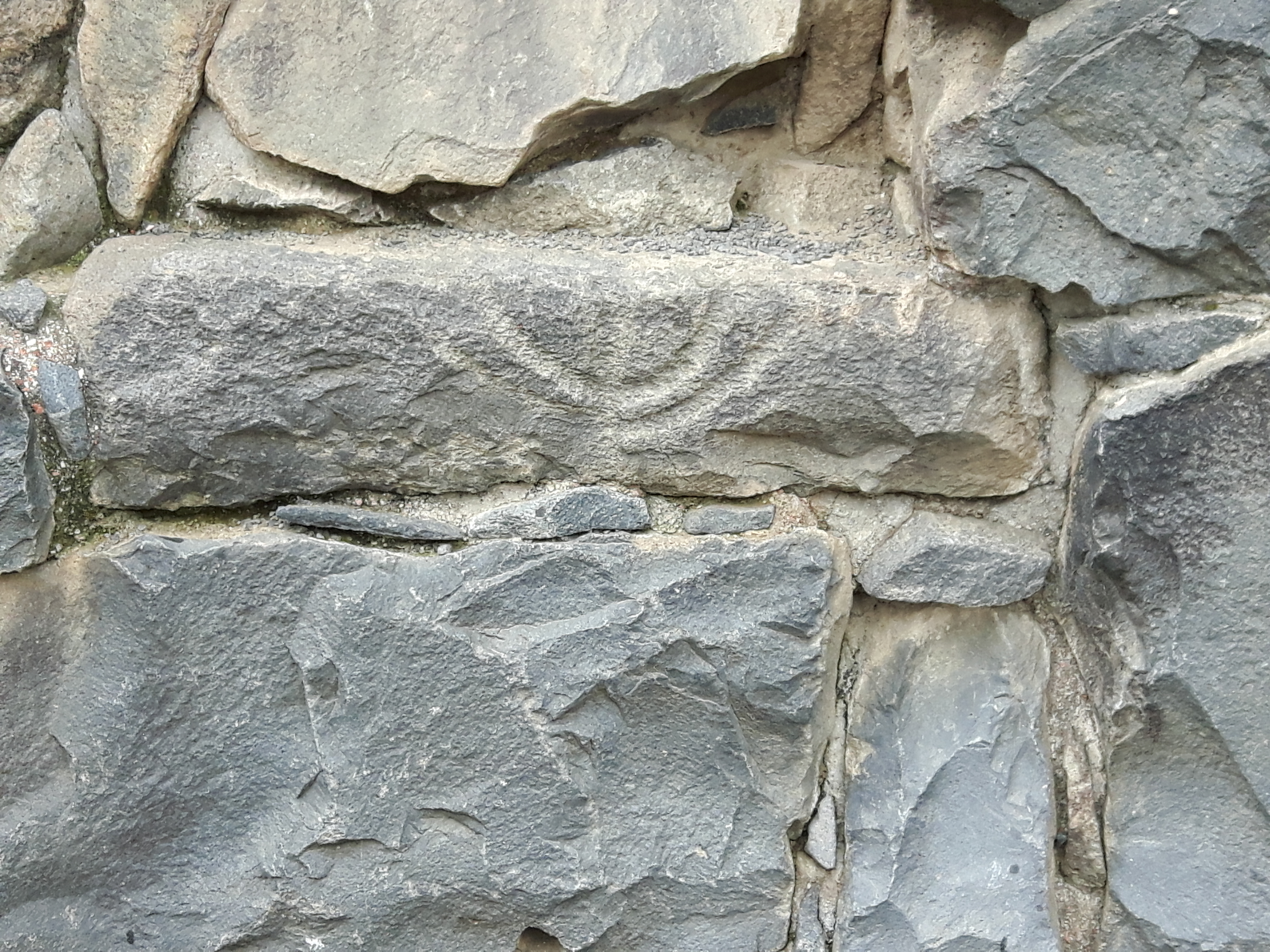
5 branch Menorah in the synagogue

The synagogue had two rows of four columns each. The building was two stories tall with rows of windows at the top of the walls. The roof was built of wooden beams covered with ceramic tiles. In the southern wall, which faces Jerusalem, two massive stone steps lead to a raised stone platform (bimah). It is thought that a wooden Torah ark would have stood here. Under the bimah there is a long, stone-paved space thought to have served as a geniza (storage space for sacred texts no longer in use). The walls were plastered and painted white, with the lower walls decorated with red geometric motifs. The walls were lined with stone benches in the form of a double step.

=== Mamluk village and Mosque ===
In the thirteenth-fourteenth century CE it became a Mamluk village and had a mosque. The Mamluk period is not presented to visitors of the site.

Transhumance shaped settlement in the Golan for centuries because of its harsh winters. The winters "forced tribespeople until the 19th century to live in hundreds of rudimentary 'winter villages' in their tribal territory. Starting in the second part of the 19th century, villages like Kisrin became "fixed and formed the nucleus of fully sedentary life in the 20th century Golan." The Mamluk period is not presented to visitors of the site.

==== Ottoman Syria, French Mandate for Syria and Independent Syria ====
The settlement was the Syrian village of Kisrin. In the 1880s, Kisrin was described as "a small Bedawin winter village, with a group of beautiful oak trees and old ruins, south of el-Ahmediyeh". From the late 19th century to 1967, the village was inhabited by Bedouins and a settled population. Since 1920 and until the independence of Syria in 1944, the area was under the jurisdiction of the French mandate. The Syrian farm of Fakhoura was just to the north-east and had about 250 inhabitants before its depopulation in 1967. The Syrian period is not presented to visitors of the site.

== Criticism of the museum ==
The site has been described by an archeologist as being developed: "with a clear agenda and nationalistic narrative." It has also been criticized for distorting historical items and showing a selective part of history, focusing on the Jewish period leaving out the Mamluk and Syrian periods.

== See also ==
- Archaeology of Israel
- History of the Jews in Syria
- List of synagogues in Syria
- Oldest synagogues in the world

== Bibliography ==
- Boytner, R.; Dodd, L.S.; Parker, B.J. (2010). Controlling the Past, Owning the Future: The Political Uses of Archaeology in the Middle East. University of Arizona Press. ISBN 978-0-8165-2795-3.
- Jameson, J.H. (2004). The Reconstructed Past: Reconstructions in the Public Interpretation of Archaeology and History. Archaeology / Conservation. AltaMira Press. ISBN 978-0-7591-0376-4.
- Killebrew, Ann E.; Grantham, Billy J.; Fine, Steven (2003). "A "Talmudic" House at Qasrin: On the Use of Domestic Space and Daily Life during the Byzantine Period". Near Eastern Archaeology. 66 (1/2). American Schools of Oriental Research: 59–72. doi:10.2307/3210932. ISSN 1094-2076. JSTOR 3210932.
- Macoz, Zvi Uri; Killebrew, Ann (1988). "Ancient Qasrin: Synagogue and Village". The Biblical Archaeologist. 51 (1). The American Schools of Oriental Research: 5–19. doi:10.2307/3210034. ISSN 0006-0895. JSTOR 3210034.
- Sulimani, Gideon; Kletter, Raz (2022). "Settler-Colonialism and the Diary of an Israeli Settler in the Golan Heights: The Notebooks of Izhaki Gal". Journal of Holy Land and Palestine Studies. 21 (1). Edinburgh University Press: 48–71. doi:10.3366/hlps.2022.0283. ISSN 2054-1988.
