= Michael Abraham (rabbi) =

Israeli physicist

- מיכאל אברהם
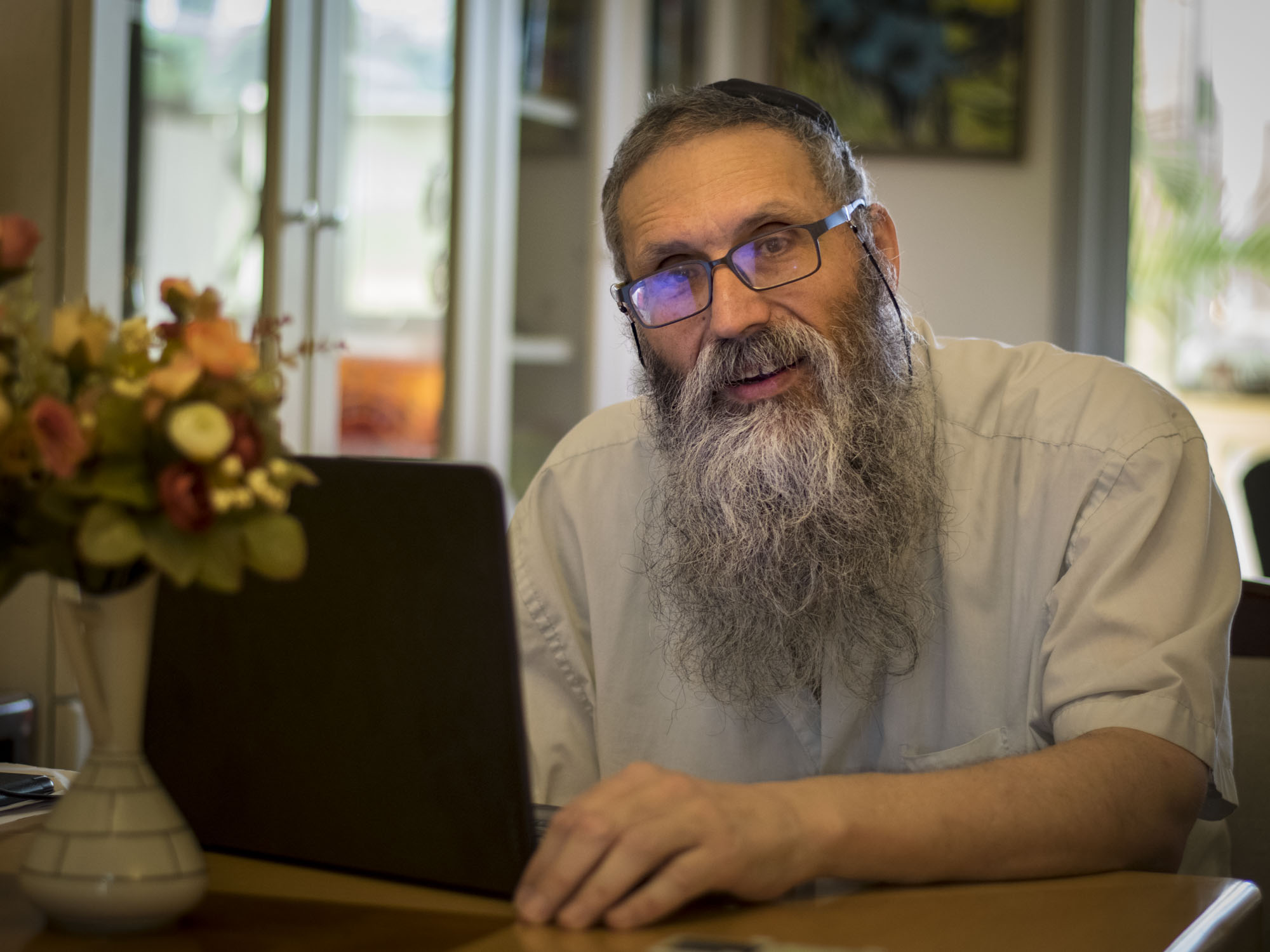
- Rabbi Dr. Michael Abraham
- Born: January 15, 1960 (age 66); Haifa, Israel
- Education: Midrashiat Noam; BSc in Electrical Engineering, Tel Aviv University; MSc in Theoretical Physics, Bar-Ilan University; PhD in Theoretical Physics, Bar-Ilan University
- Occupations: Physicist & Author
- Employer: Bar-Ilan University
- Known for: Contributions to Talmudic logic, Philosophy, Religion, and Science
- Works: The Science of Freedom: An Intriguing Perspective; Various articles in theoretical physics and Talmudic logic
- Children: 6

Michael Abraham (also Michael Avraham) (Hebrew מיכאל אברהם; born January 15, 1960) is an Israeli rabbi at Bar-Ilan University's Machon HaGavoah LeTorah ("Institute of Advanced Torah Studies") and holds a Ph.D. in theoretical physics.

== Personal life ==
Abraham was born in the city of Haifa, studied in a Midrashiat Noam yeshiva high-school and then at Yeshivat Har Etzion. He served in the IDF as a tank commander. He went on to study in an ultra-orthodox yeshiva in Bnei Brak. He received a bachelor's degree in electrical engineering from Tel Aviv University and a master's and Phd in theoretical physics from Bar-Ilan University focused on mesoscopic physics. He spent several years in the town of Yeruham teaching at the local Hesder yeshiva. Since 2012, he lives in Lod and teaches at Bar-Ilan University's Institute of Advanced Torah Studies. Abraham is married and has six children.

== Works ==
Together with Gavriel Hazut, Avrham founded an organization called 'mida tova' focused on the use of formal logic and talmudical hermeneutics in the modern study of Torah and halakha (Jewish law). He is also part of the group in Bar-Ilan University who publish "Studies in Talmudic Logic". Abraham authored a series of popular books analyzing the relationship between Judaism and postmodernism as well as other issues at the intersection of philosophy, religion, and science. Abraham is known as an independent thinker with unorthodox views on several controversial topics including his attitude towards religious dogma and the need to reform parts of Halakha.

== List of publications in English ==
=== Articles ===
- An extension of the multiple trapping models for transient photocurrents in amorphous semiconductors, Philosophical Magazine B 60, p. 523, 1989.
- The effect on recombination in amorphous semiconductors of transitions between localized states, Philosophical Magazine B 62, p. 537, 1990.
- Persistent currents in an interacting 1d disordered ring: manifestations of the Mott-Hubbard transition, Physical Review Letters 70, p. 1509, 1993.
- Persistent currents in interacting lattice models, Physica A 200, p. 519, 1993.
- AC conductance of an interacting quantum dot: single electron level spectroscopy, J. of Physics Condensed Matter 5, p. L175, 1993.
- Mesoscopic persistent current correlations in the presence of strong magnetic fields, Physical Review B 49, p. 1328, 1994.
- Language and codification dependence of long range correlations, Fractals 2, p. 7, 1994.
- Vortex dynamics in a model of superflow: the role of acoustic excitations, Rapid Communication in Physical Review B 52, p. R7018, 1995.
- Effects of symmetry on thermodynamical properties of rotating quantum gases, Z. Olami, Solid state communications 80, p. 657, 1996.
- Thermodynamics of rotating quantum systems, Physica A 233, p. 503, 1996.
- Effect of a rotating potential on a quantum particle, Physical Review A 54, 4, p. 2659, 1996.
- Analysis of the Talmudic Argumentum A Fortiori Inference Rule (Kal-Vachomer) Using Matrix Abduction, Studia Logica 92, 2009, p. 281.
- Logical Analysis of the Talmudic Rules of General and Specific (Klalim-u-Pratim), The journal History and Philosophy of Logic 32, 2011, p. 47.
- Obligations and prohibitions in Talmudic deontic logic, Artificial Intelligence and Law: Volume 19, Issue 2 (2011), Page 117-148
- The handling of loops in Talmudic Logic, with application to odd and even loops in argumentation, proceedings of Howard 60, Manchester Dec 20, 2011, Editors D Rydeheard, A Voronkov and M Korovina, pp 1–25.
- Delegation, count as and security in Talmudic logic, a preliminary study, to Logic without Frontiers: Festschrift for Walter Alexandre Carnielli on the occasion of his 60th Birthday. Jean-Yves Béziau and Marcelo Esteban Coniglio (eds.) Volume 17 of Tribute Series, College Publications. London, 2011. ISBN 978-1-84890-055-4, pp 73–96.
- Obligations and Prohibitions in Talmudic Deontic Logic, DEON 2010, Governatori G., Sartor G., eds., LNAI 6181, Springer, pp. 166–178.

=== Books ===
- The Science of Freedom: An Intriguing Perspective, Questioning Determinism Through Philosophy, Cognitive Neuroscience & Quantum physics, Philogic Publishing (February 4, 2018), ASIN B079LBL1XX
