= Midrashiat Noam =

ORT Midrashiat Noam
- מדרשית נעם
- The school's exterior in 2024
- Kfar Saba, Israel

Information
- Type: Yeshiva high school
- Religious affiliation: Religious Zionism
- Established: 1945
- Oversight: ORT Israel
- Principal: Eliakim Shiuvitz
- Head of school: Rabbi Zvi Azrahi
- Gender: Male
- Website: midrashiatnoam.co.il

Midrashiat Noam (Hebrew: מדרשית נעם, commonly known as The Midrashia) is a prominent religious Zionist yeshiva high school in Israel. Originally established in Pardes Hanna in 1945, it was the first flagship institution of its kind designed to integrate rigorous Torah studies with a high-level general education. Today, the school operates in Kfar Saba under the management of the ORT Israel network.

== History ==
During its operation in Pardes Hanna, the institution became highly influential across Israel. Under the guidance of school leadership and Rabbi Shaul Israeli, the school developed and edited Perakim Be'Machshavat Yisrael (Chapters in Jewish Thought), a pioneering textbook published by Midrashiat Noam in 1952 that was widely adopted by schools throughout Israel for official state matriculation (Bagrut) exams.

By the late 1990s and early 2000s, the Pardes Hanna campus suffered from severe disciplinary issues, student rebellion, and structural vandalism. In 2005, the Kfar Saba preparatory division was expanded into a full six-year high school, and the original Pardes Hanna campus permanently closed its doors following the graduation of its final class in 2007.

== 2023 Documentary ==
In 2023, an investigative documentary film titled The Midrashia (also known as Once Upon a School)—directed by school alumnus Tal Bechar alongside Netanel Yemin and Yair Agmon—was screened at the Docaviv film festival before broadcasting nationally on Kan 11. The film documented a long-standing internal culture of intense peer pressure, severe hazing rituals (known as "Zobors"), widespread vandalism, and institutional negligence that plagued the boarding school environment during its final decades in Pardes Hanna.

== Notable alumni ==
The school has produced numerous influential figures in Israeli politics, law, education, and military, including:

- Ofir Sofer – Minister of Aliyah and Integration.
- Yaakov Neeman – Former Minister of Justice and Minister of Finance.
- Eitan Cabel – Former Member of the Knesset for the Labor Party.
- Yehudah Glick – Rabbi, activist, and former Member of the Knesset.
- David Mintz – Justice of the Supreme Court of Israel.
- Michael Abraham – Rabbi, prominent analytical philosopher, author, and researcher at Bar-Ilan University.
- Yoram Cohen – Former Director of the Shin Bet (Israel Security Agency).
