= HaEmek Medical Center =

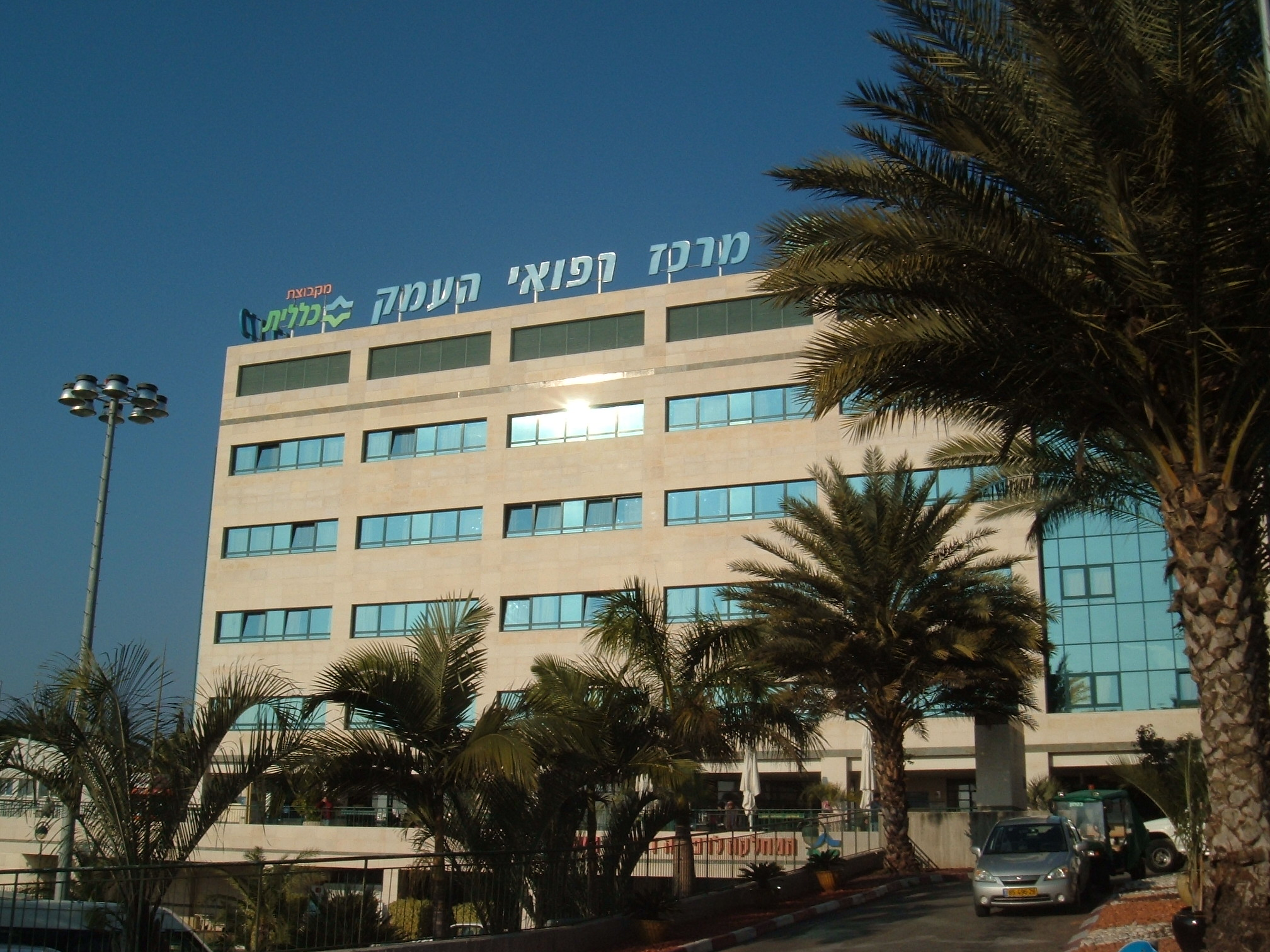
- Front view of the HaEmek Medical Center Campus

Geography
- Location: Afula, Israel
- Coordinates: 32°37′15″N 35°18′57″E

Organisation
- Type: District General, Teaching
- Affiliated university: Rappaport Faculty of Medicine

Services
- Beds: 580

History
- Opened: 29 April 1930

Links
- Lists: Hospitals in Israel

HaEmek Medical Center (Hebrew: מרכז רפואי העמק, Merkaz refu'i ha-Emek, lit. "The Valley Medical Center") is a regional hospital in the northern Israeli city of Afula.

Located in the central part of the Jezreel Valley (Emek Yizrael), the hospital is one in a network of hospitals owned and operated by Clalit Health Services, and is affiliated with the Technion's Rappaport Faculty of Medicine.

== History ==
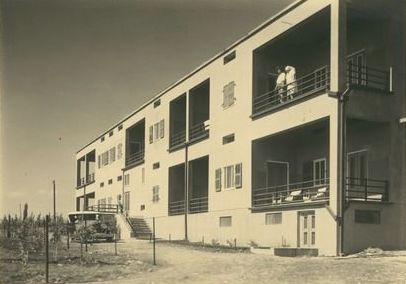
HaEmek Hospital in the 1930s

The origins of this medical institution date back to a design by Alexander Baerwald in 1924. The hospital was opened on April 29, 1930. In 1932 it was temporarily closed due to lack of funds. Through the years the hospital gradually grew into one of the biggest medical facilities in Israel. Nowadays the hospital serves about 700,000 residents of the adjacent region. The hospital has about 1,900 employees.

The hospital is located at an altitude of about 500 meters northeast of Afula, off of Highway 65.

The hospital is said to be a place of Arab-Israeli co-existence, and the two peoples work closely together.

== See also ==
- Health care in Israel
