= Hydrobiologia =

Peer-reviewed scientific journal

- Discipline: Hydrobiology
- Language: English
- Edited by: Koen Martens

Publication details
- History: 1948–present
- Publisher: Springer
- Open access: Hybrid
- Impact factor: 2.385 (2019)

Standard abbreviations
- ISO 4: Hydrobiologia

Indexing
- ISSN: 0018-8158 (print); 1573-5117 (web)

Links
- Journal homepage

Hydrobiologia, The International Journal of Aquatic Sciences, is a peer-reviewed scientific journal publishing 21 issues per year, for a total of well over 4000 pages per year. Hydrobiologia publishes original research, reviews and opinions investigating the biology of freshwater and marine habitats, including the impact of human activities. Coverage includes molecular-, organism-, community -and ecosystem-level studies dealing with biological research in limnology and oceanography, including systematics and aquatic ecology. In addition to hypothesis-driven experimental research, it presents theoretical papers relevant to a broad hydrobiological audience, and collections of papers in special issues covering focused topics.

== History ==
Hydrobiologia changed on the appointment of Henri Dumont to be its editor-in-chief. He introduced peer review, and expanded production from 6 issues per year to more than 20 per year. Koen Martens took over the responsibility as editor-in-chief in 2003, with the aim of increasing the relevance and impact of the journal to a broader readership. In 2015, due to the increase in the number of submissions, three associate editors-in-chief started helping him to manage a group of about 45 academic editors.

== Abstracting and indexing ==
The journal is indexed by Web of Science, Scopus, PubMed, Scimago, and several other indexes.

== Notable articles ==
The three most highly cited papers in Hydrobiologia, with more than 600 citations, are:

- Søndergaard, M., Jensen, J. P., & Jeppesen, E. Søndergaard, Martin; Jensen, Jens Peder; Jeppesen, Erik (2003). "Role of sediment and internal loading of phosphorus in shallow lakes". Hydrobiologia. 506 (1–3): 135–145. Bibcode:2003HyBio.506..135S. doi:10.1023/B:HYDR.0000008611.12704.dd. S2CID 4852225.
- ter Braak, C. J., & Juggins, S. Ter Braak, Cajo J. F.; Juggins, Steve (1993). "Weighted averaging partial least squares regression (WA-PLS): an improved method for reconstructing environmental variables from species assemblages". Hydrobiologia. 269 (1): 485–502. Bibcode:1993HyBio.269..485T. doi:10.1007/BF00028046. S2CID 15402155.
- Qin, B., Xu, P., Wu, Q., Luo, L., & Zhang, Y. Qin, Boqiang; Xu, Pengzhu; Wu, Qinglong; Luo, Liancong; Zhang, Yunlin (2007). "Environmental issues of lake Taihu, China". Hydrobiologia. 581 (1): 3–14. Bibcode:2007HyBio.581....3Q. doi:10.1007/s10750-006-0521-5. S2CID 21108027.
