= Zvi Zylbertal =

Israeli jurist

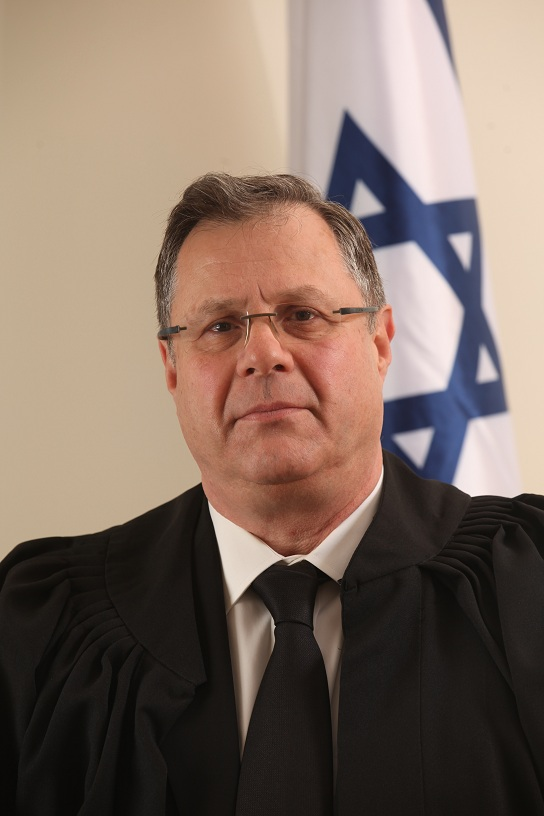

Zvi Zylbertal (Hebrew: צְבִי זִילְבֶּרְטַל; born 1952) is an Israeli jurist who served on the Supreme Court of Israel between 2012 and 2017. Prior to his Supreme Court tenure, he served on the Jerusalem District Court.

== Career ==
Zylbertal was born in Jerusalem in 1952. He was admitted to the Israeli Bar Association in 1983. He was appointed to the Jerusalem District Court in 2000, where he served as a judge until being appointed to the Supreme Court in 2012. In March 2016, he made a surprise announcement that he planned to retire in April 2017, which he did. He was replaced by David Mintz.
