= Tel-Hai University of Kiryat Shmona in the Galilee =

Coordinates: 33°14′8.32″N 35°34′43.89″E

- תל־חי אוניברסיטת קריית שמונה בגליל
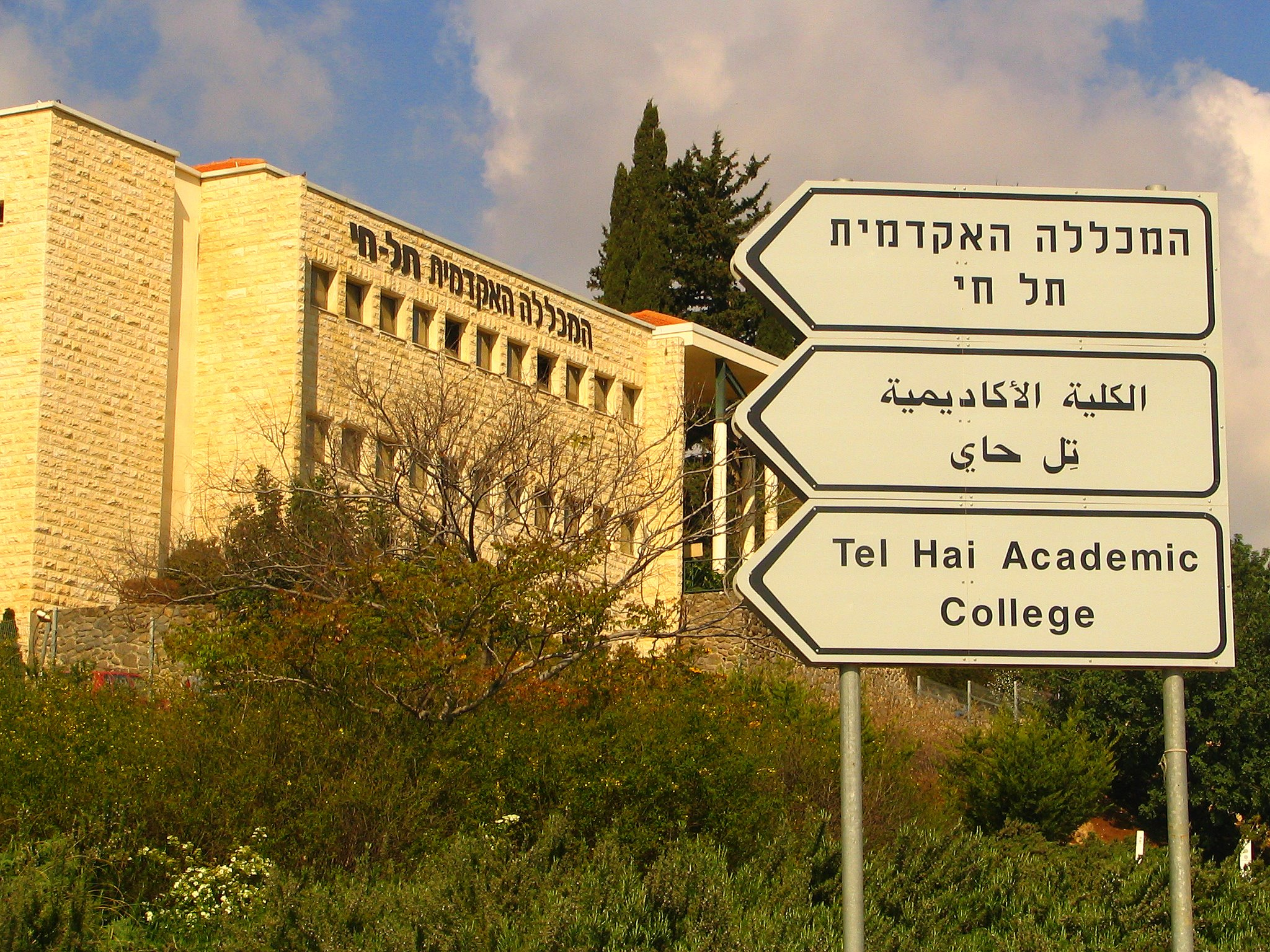
- Roadsign before a building within the Tel-Hai Western Campus
- Former name: Tel-Hai Academic College
- Type: Public
- Established: 1957
- Chairman: Ze'ev Peldman
- President: Eliezer Shalev
- Provost: Eli Kohen
- Faculty: 1,715
- Students: 6,000
- Undergraduates: 3,009
- Postgraduates: 536
- Location: Tel Hai, HaTzafon, Israel
- Campus: Tel-Hai Western Campus, Tel-Hai Eastern Campus, Ohalo Campus, MIGAL Research Institute, Tel-Hai Kiryat Shmona Campus
- Language: Hebrew
- Colors: Green and White
- Mascot: The Roaring Lion
- Website: http://english.telhai.ac.il/

Tel-Hai University is a university and college located in Tel Hai in northern Israel, with campuses near Kibbutz Kfar Giladi and north of Kiryat Shmona, as well as in Katzrin and within Kiryat Shmona itself. Tel-Hai University (formerly Tel-Hai Regional College) is a university located in the Galilee Panhandle, north of Kiryat Shmona, at the site where the early settlement of Tel-Hai once stood (now part of Kibbutz Kfar Giladi) and the site of a historic battle in 1920. In 2021, it merged with the Ohalo College of Education (located on the Katzrin campus). In May 2024, the Council for Higher Education in Israel approved the college's transition to university status. On January 19, 2026, the Council officially accredited it as a university, completing the process. It is the first university in the Upper Galilee and the third in the Galilee region of northern Israel, following the Technion (1924) and the University of Haifa (1963).

== History ==
In 1957, the Upper Galilee Regional Council established an adult education school and an arts center at Tel Hai. In 1963, vocational education was added. By the mid-1960s, the center served approximately 400-500 members of nearby kibbutzim, randing from high school students to retirees. By the 1970s, the school was renamed the Tel-Hai Regional College and conducted academic programs under the auspices of the University of Haifa.

On 22 May 2024, amidst the aggression of Hezbollah against northern municipalities during the Gaza war, the Council for Higher Education led by the Israeli Minister of Education Yoav Kisch decided to initiate the process of transforming the college into a university. On January 19, 2026, the Council for Higher Education granted the college university status, thereby completing the transition. Consequently, the college changed its name to "Tel-Hai – Kiryat Shmona University in the Galilee". Prof. Eliezer Shalev serves as the university's president.

== See also ==
- List of universities and colleges in Israel
