= Katzrin =

Israeli settlement in the Golan Heights

Katzrin קצרין (Hebrew) قصرين (Arabic)
- Local council
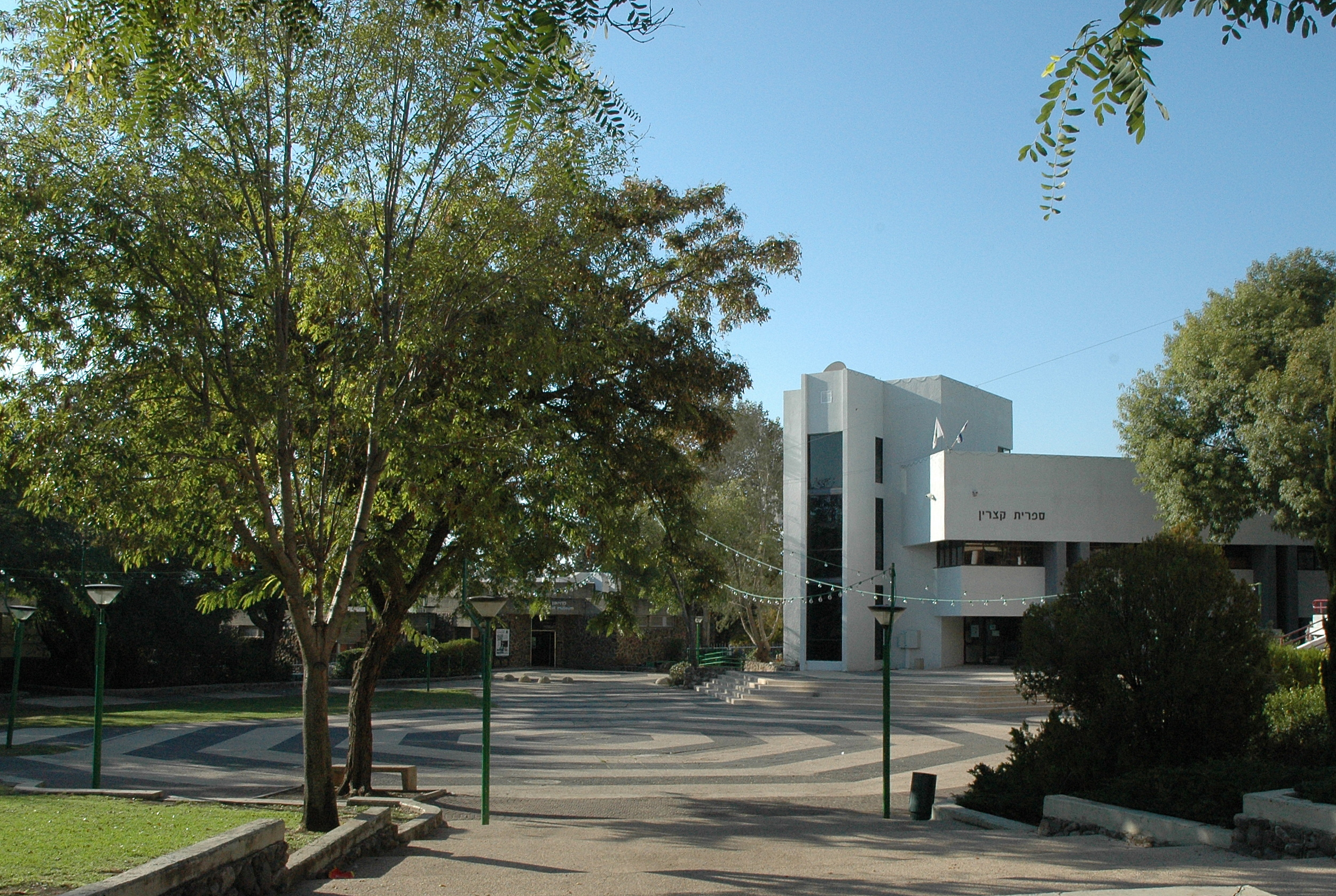
- Street in Katzrin

- Coat of arms

- Location within the Golan Heights Location within Israel Location within Syria
- Coordinates: 32°59′31″N 35°41′28″E
- Israeli District: Northern
- Israeli Subdistrict: Golan
- Natural Region: Middle Golan
- Syrian Governorate: Quneitra
- Syrian District: Quneitra
- Syrian Subdistrict: Quneitra
- Founded: 1977; 49 years ago

Government
  - Head of Municipality: Yehuda Dua

Area
  - Total: 10,930 dunams (10.93 km^{2}; 4.22 sq mi)
- Elevation: 339 m (1,112 ft)

Population (2024)
  - Total: 8,013
  - Density: 733.1/km^{2} (1,899/sq mi)

Ethnicity
  - Jews and others: 99.0%
  - Arabs: 1.0%
- Time zone: UTC+2 (IST)
  - Summer (DST): UTC+3 (IDT)
- Website: katsrin.com

Katzrin (Hebrew: קצרין; Arabic: قصرين, romanized: Qaṣrīn), also Qatzrin, is an Israeli settlement organized as a local council in the Golan Heights, taken from Syria in the Six-Day War. Known as "the capital of the Golan", it is the second-largest locality there after Majdal Shams, and the largest Israeli settlement. It is the seat of Golan Regional Council. In 2024 it had a population of 8,013.

Most of the international community considers Israeli settlements in the Golan Heights illegal under international law, though the governments of Israel, the United States, and Colombia dispute this. Since 2019, the United States has recognized that the Golan Heights are under the sovereignty of Israel, and since 2026, Colombia has done the same.

== History ==
=== Bronze Age to Early Islamic period ===
The site was occupied from the Middle Bronze Age, continuing into the Iron Age, the Hellenistic and Roman periods (during the latter it was once destroyed), while the most substantial structural remains date from the Late Roman, Byzantine and Early Islamic periods (3rd–4th to mid-8th centuries), when the site was a Jewish village with a synagogue called Katzrin.

Katzrin served as an important trading location in the region but started to decline with the change of trading routes after the Islamic conquest of the Levant by Rashidun Caliphate in 634–638 CE. The village was destroyed in the 749 Galilee earthquake, under the Umayyad Caliphate. As a result of the earthquake the declining Jewish population abandoned the location.

=== Mamluk period ===
During the Mamluk period (13th–14th centuries), Kasrein was a Muslim village, and a mosque was built upon the ruins (Note: Those synagogue ruins are estimated to have been 500-900 years old at the time of the construction of the mosque (Note: Based on facts from elsewhere in this article)) of the synagogue.

=== Ottoman, French and Syrian periods ===
In the 1880s, Kisrin, at the east edge of the modern town, was described as "a small Bedawin winter village, with a group of beautiful oak trees and old ruins". From the late 19th century to 1967, the village was occupied by Bedouin and a settled population. Since 1920 and until the independence of Syria in 1944, the area was under the jurisdiction of the French Mandate. The Syrian farm of Fakhoura was just to the north-east and had about 250 inhabitants before its depopulation in 1967.

=== Israeli occupation ===
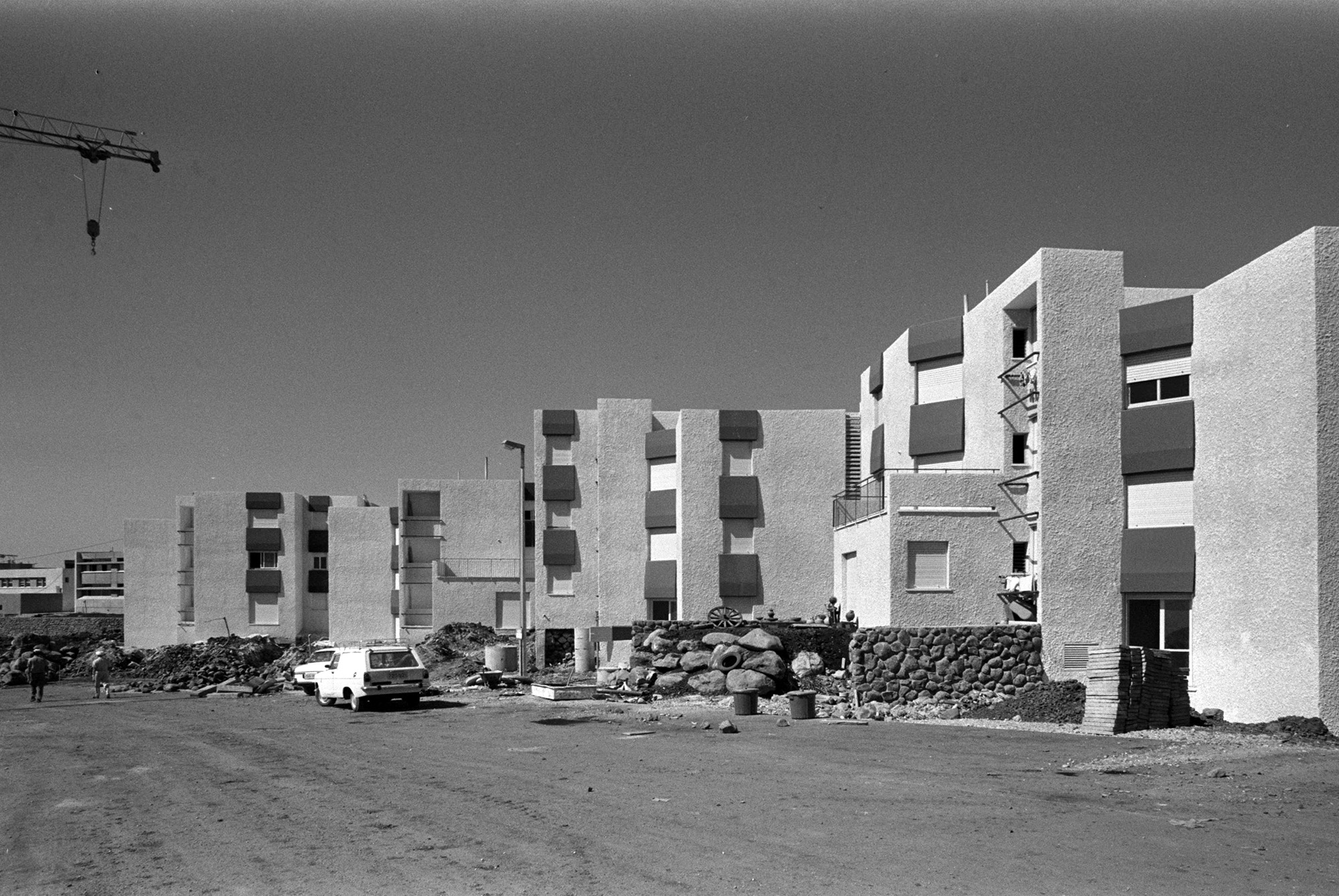
Katzrin, 1977

Katzrin was established in 1977 as a planned urban center for the Golan Heights based on a decision of the Israeli government in November 1973. Construction began in 1976. In 1981, under the Golan Heights Law, Israel applied Israeli civil law in the Golan Heights (including Katzrin). This law was condemned internationally and by the United Nations Security Council (UNSC). Katzrin serves as a district town, that provides educational, administrative and cultural services to the surrounding region.

== Geography ==
To the south of Katzrin is the Sea of Galilee, to the north Mount Hermon, and to the west are the Upper Galilee hills of Israel.

== Demographics ==
Historical population
Year	Pop.	±%
1983	1,900	—
1995	4,900	+157.9%
2008	6,500	+32.7%
2022	7,633	+17.4%
2024	8,012	+5.0%

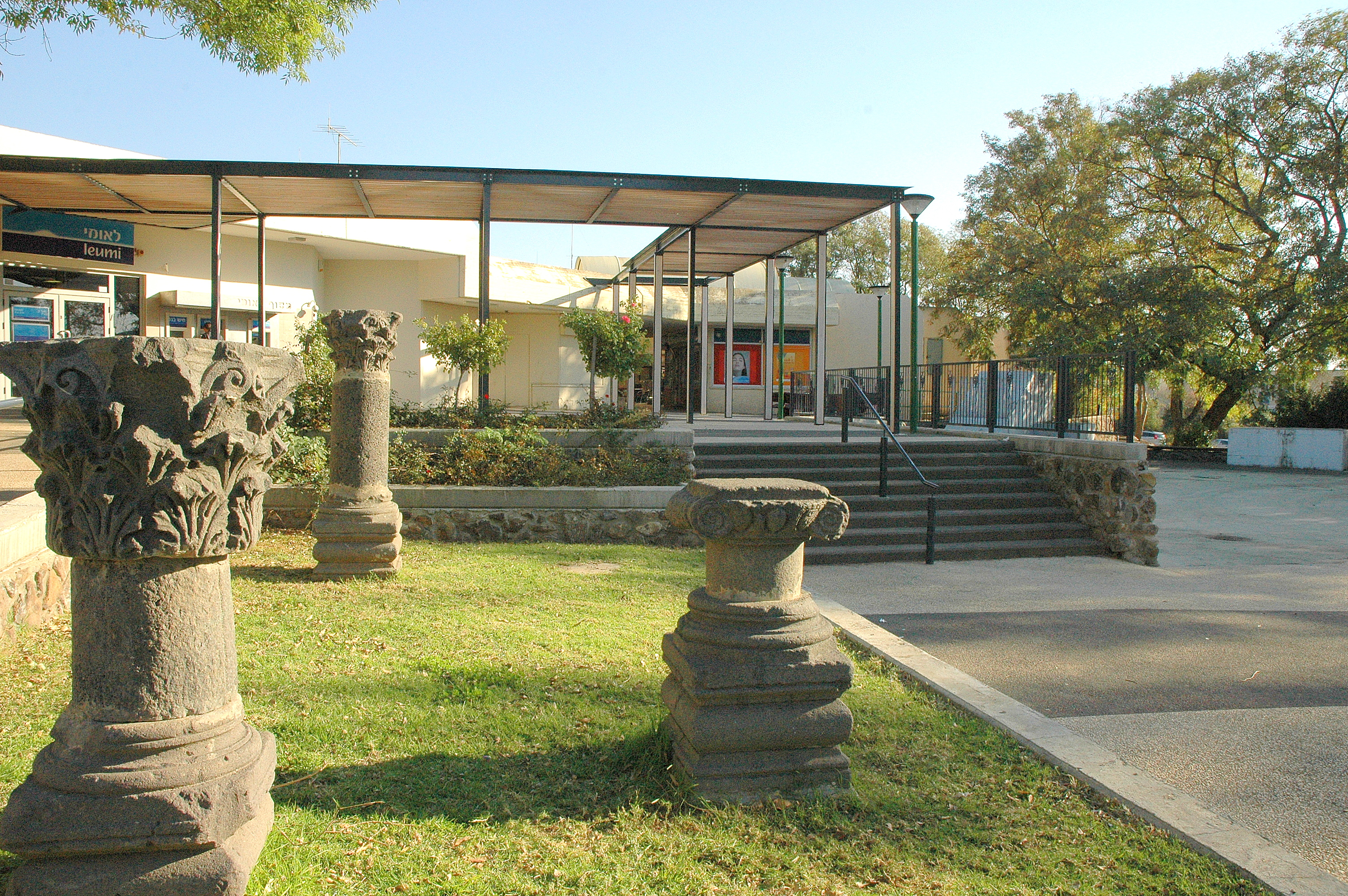
Entrance to Katzrin Mall

According to the Israel Central Bureau of Statistics (CBS), Katzrin had a population of about 8,013 at the end of 2024, making it the second largest locality in the Golan Heights after Majdal Shams, and the largest Israeli settlement.

The early residents were young couples and professionals from Tel Aviv and Haifa. At the end of the 1980s, many Soviet Jews settled in Katzrin. Today, a third of the city's residents are Jews from the former Soviet Union and their descendants. Religious educators also moved to Katzrin, establishing a religious day school and a premilitary academy. There are also 30 Druze families and a few Israeli Arab families living in the town.

Katzrin is divided into six neighbourhoods: Gamla, Naveh, Kedma, Afek, Batra, and Hen. Building of infrastructure for an additional neighbourhood, Yovel, began in 2018.

=== Education ===
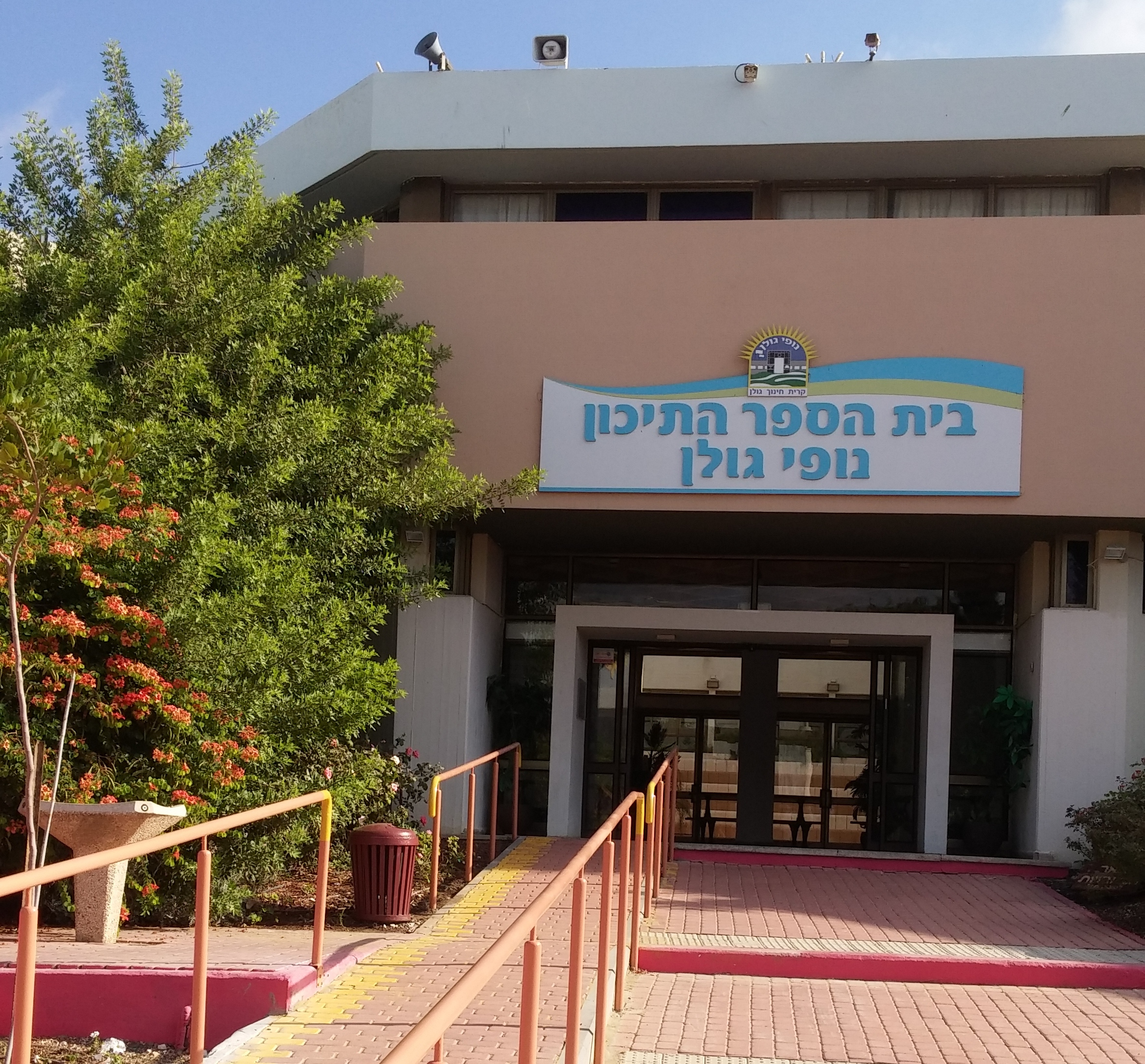
Nofey Golan High School

Ohalo College, a teacher training college, moved to Katzrin in 1988. In 2010, the college opened a department devoted to sustainable development and renewable energy. Students explore the interrelationship of different renewable energy sources and their impact on the sustainability of development in the Golan Heights and Galilee. Katzrin has twelve preschools (including three for special needs children); two elementary schools (one religious and one secular) and a comprehensive regional Nofey Golan High School with over 1,000 students.

== Economy ==
The Golan Heights Winery is located in Katzrin. In 2008, the large Chinese solar company Suntech Power and Israeli company Solarit Doral built Israel's largest solar power station, a 50 kW rooftop project near the town, and connected it to the electric grid. The Mey Eden mineral water bottling plant and the Golan Olive Oil Mill are in Katzrin. Golan Olive Oil produces some 50 tons of olive oil, sold locally and exported. During the olive harvest season, which begins in October, visitors can watch the processing procedure, from crushing to bottling.

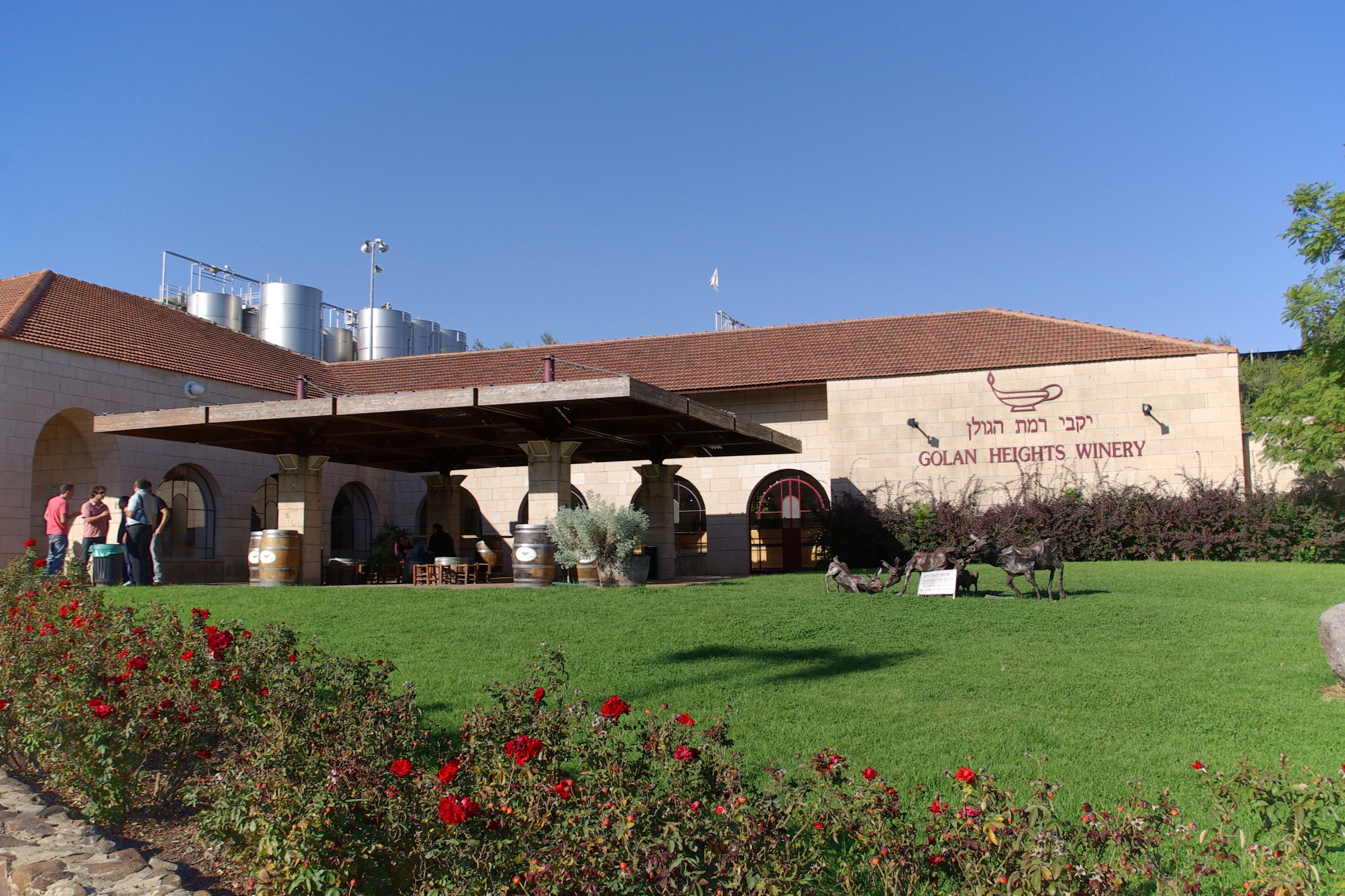
Golan Heights Winery, Katzrin

A tourist attraction in Katzrin is the Magic of the Golan, a special effects movie screened at the local mall that depicts the spectacular scenery of the region.

Near Katzrin in 2015, Afek Oil & Gas, a subsidiary of Genie Energy Ltd. and controls Genie Energy Ltd.'s oil and gas exploratory project in Northern Israel and the Golan Heights region, discovered significant oil and natural gas reserves. (Note: As of 2015, Israel consumes 270,000 barrels of oil per day.) As of October 2015, an estimate of the volume of resources and to what extent they may be extractable is unknown.

== Transportation ==
The Golan Regional Council operates seven buses per day from Katzrin to the Israeli city of Tiberias, a ride which takes approximately 49 minutes. Egged also operates twice-a-day bus service to Rosh Pinna (and ultimately all the way to Haifa). Katzrin is located between Highway 87 and Highway 91, major roads running through the Golan Heights.

== Culture ==
=== Archaeology ===
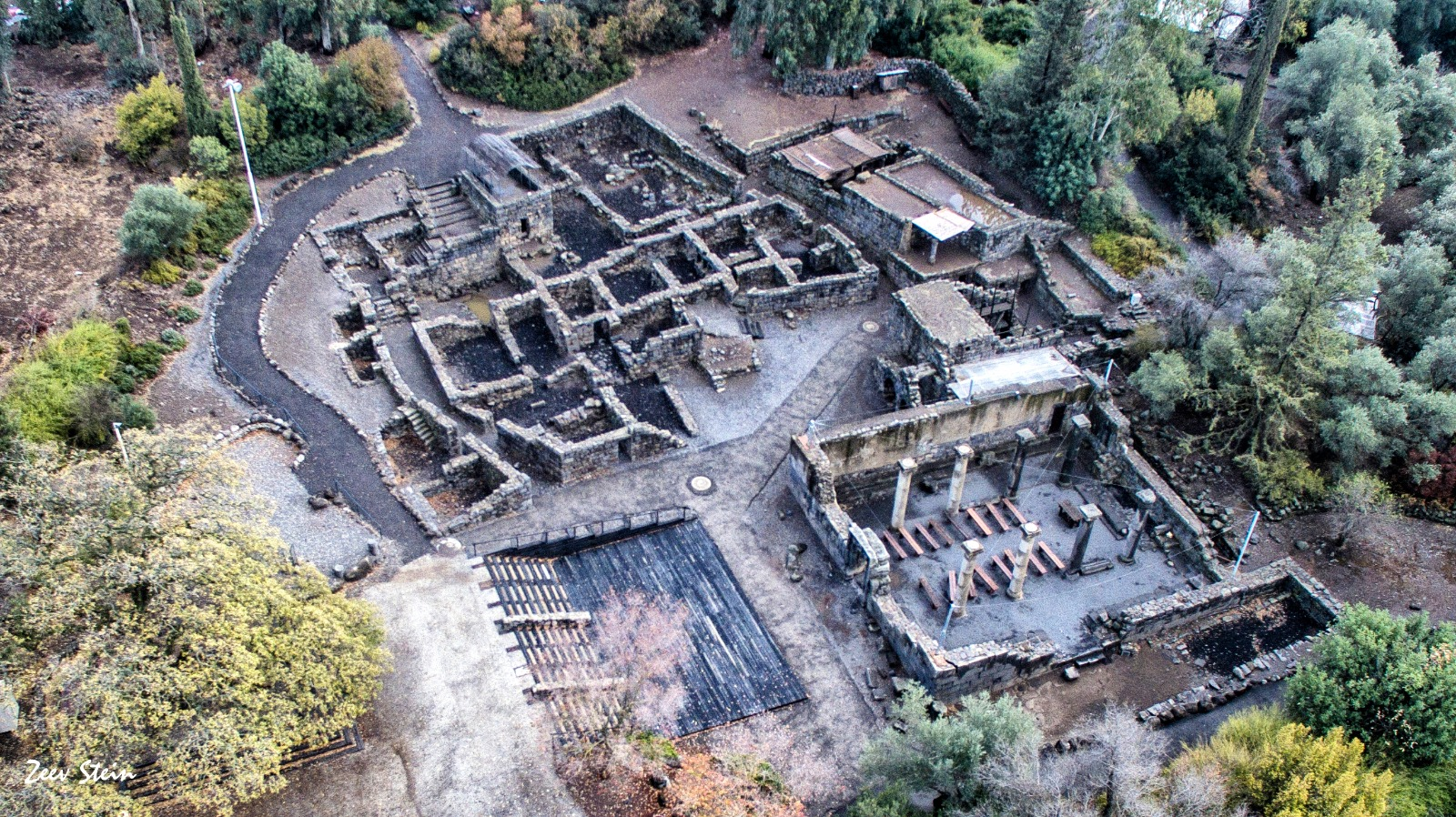
Katzrin ancient village

Before 1967, the antiquities site on the outskirts of Katzrin was a closed military zone and off-limits to archaeological research. Investigation by Israeli archaeologists commenced in 1972. Katzrin ancient village and synagogue was reconstructed and opened to the public as a "Talmudic village" set in a national park. The Golan Antiquities Museum in Katzrin houses archeological findings from the region and screens an audiovisual presentation about Gamla, a Jewish town in the Golan Heights that fought the Romans in the 1st century.

== Voting Patterns ==
In the 2022 election, 57 percent of voters in Katzrin voted for the parties of the right-wing coalition led by Benjamin Netanyahu, while 39 percent voted for the parties of the center-left coalition led by Yair Lapid and 0.1 percent voted for the Arab parties.

In the 2026 election, 56 percent of voters in Katzrin voted for the parties of the right-wing coalition led by Benjamin Netanyahu, while 37 percent voted for the parties of the center-left coalition led by Gadi Eisenkot and 0.3 percent voted for the Arab parties. An additional 2.6 percent voted for the Reservists, and 2.6 percent voted for Amcha Yisrael. Voter turnout increased 25 percent from the 2022 election.

== Twin towns – sister cities ==
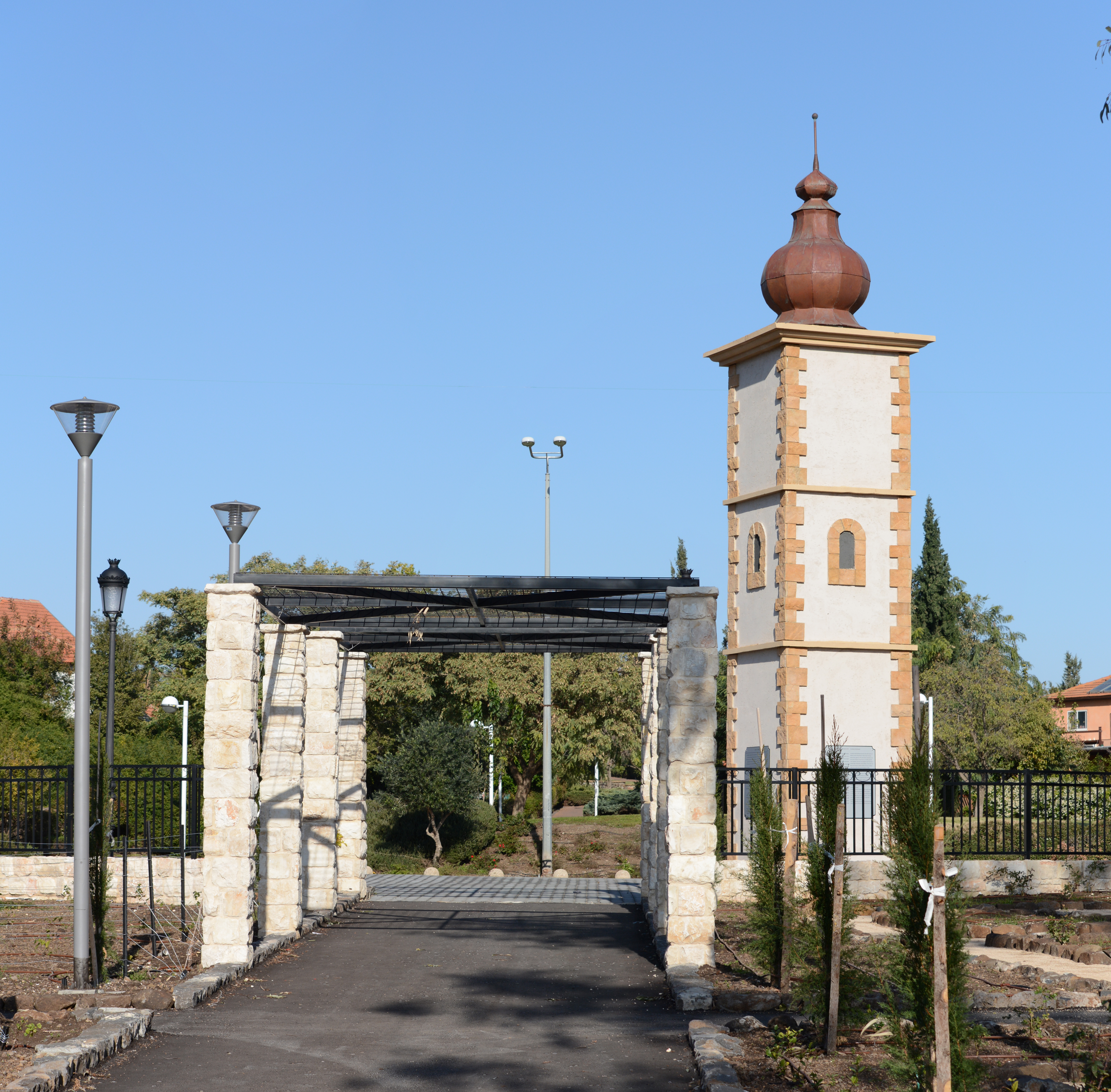
Mikulov Park in Katzrin

Katzrin is twinned with:

- (Czech Republic) Mikulov, Czechia – In 2012, a Czech delegation visiting Israel and the Golan Heights attended a cornerstone ceremony for Mikulov Park in Katzrin attended by the Czech Deputy Ambassador to Israel. Special features of the park are a miniature replica of the clock tower of Mikulov and an audio station where visitors can learn about the history of Mikulov.
