= Natur (Israeli settlement) =

Israeli settlement in the Golan Heights

Natur: נָטוּר (Hebrew)
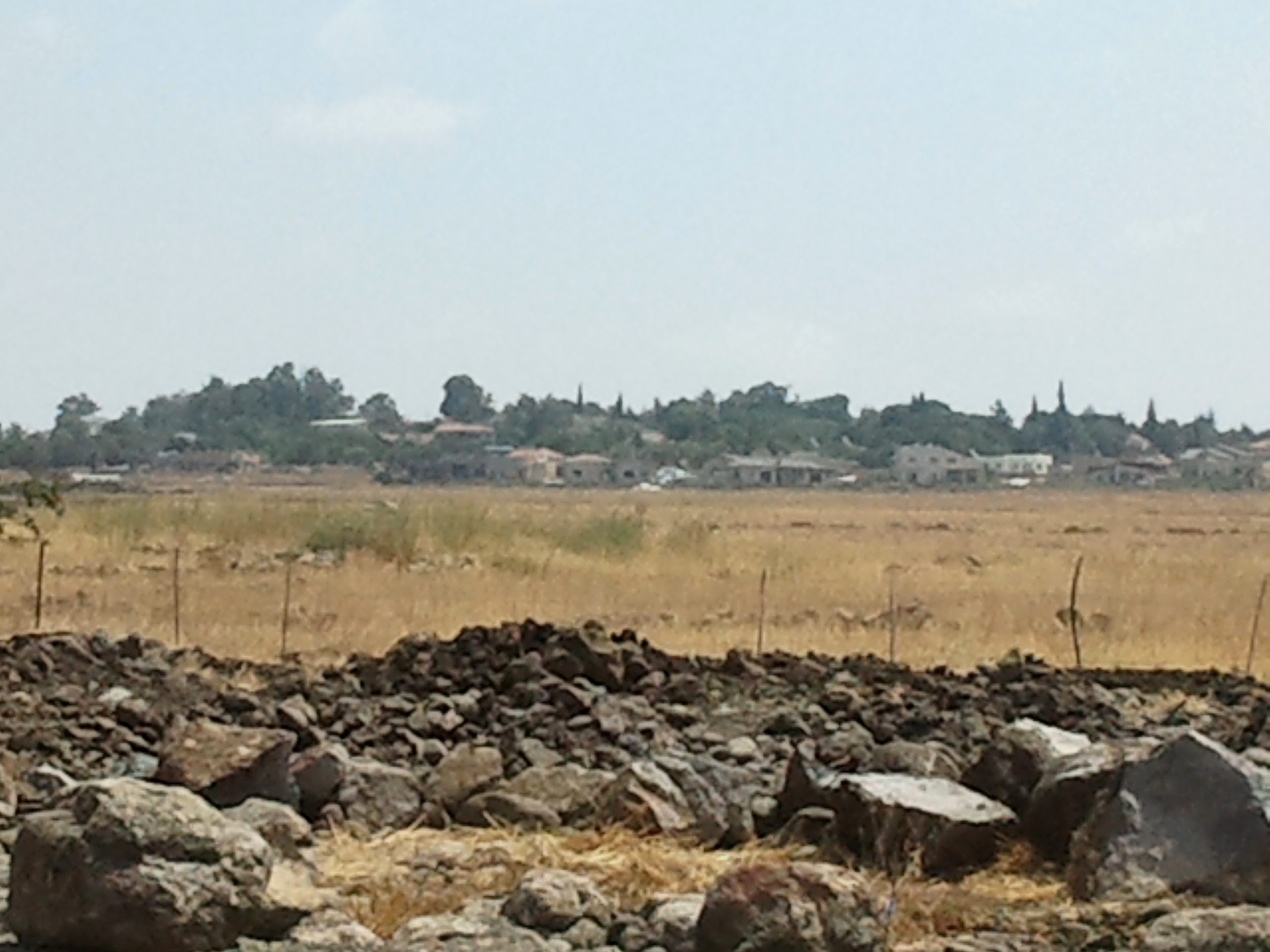

- Location within the Golan Heights Location within the Golan Heights
- Coordinates: 32°51′12″N 35°45′13″E
- Country: Golan Heights (Internationally recognized as Syrian territory occupied by Israel.)
- District: Northern
- Subdistrict: Golan
- Council: Golan Regional Council
- Region: Golan Heights
- Affiliation: Kibbutz Movement
- Founded: 1980; 46 years ago
- Founder: Hashomer Hatzair members

Natur is an Israeli settlement and mixed secular-religious moshav in the southern Golan Heights. It is located near one of the region’s largest streams, Nahal Samakh, and about 10 kilometers from Lake Kinneret. It falls under the jurisdiction of the Golan Regional Council. The international community considers Israeli settlements in the Golan Heights illegal under international law, but the Israeli government disagrees.

The settlement was founded as a kibbutz in 1980 by members of the Hashomer Hatzair movement, amid internal debates about settlement in the region. In December 2007, it was transformed into a moshav due to financial difficulties and the inability to attract new residents; at its peak as a kibbutz, it had only about 30 members. This transformation made Natur one of only three kibbutzim in Israel's history to convert into a cooperative moshav, alongside Masu'ot Yitzhak and Bnei Darom in the Lachish region during the 1950s and 1960s. Today, Natur is home to both religious and secular families, with a population of 1000 as of 2024.

== History ==
The establishment of the settlement began in the summer of 1977 with the formation of a settlement core by Hashomer Hatzair youth movement. By late 1978, land preparation work was completed and construction began. The kibbutz was officially founded on February 8, 1980.

The settlement's establishment was accompanied by controversy between the Kibbutz Artzi movement and the Hashomer Hatzair, which opposed settlements beyond the Green Line, while Kibbutz Artzi passed a resolution supporting border adjustments in the Golan Heights and settlement in the western part of the plateau. Ultimately, a compromise was reached whereby Nahal soldiers who were Hashomer Hatzair members would establish the settlement.

In 1985, the kibbutz, along with other Golan Heights and Jordan Valley settlements, received emergency government assistance following Israel's inflationary crisis and accumulated debts. In 1991, following the Madrid Conference and the opening of peace talks between Israel and Syria, kibbutz residents declared they would refuse to leave the settlement as part of any peace agreement.

In December 2007, the kibbutz transformed into a mixed secular-religious moshav. The change was attributed to difficulties in establishing itself financially and in attracting new residents; at its peak, the kibbutz had only about 30 members. Since the founding of the kibbutz movement in 1909, only two other kibbutzim—Masu'ot Yitzhak and Bnei Darom in the Lachish region—had undergone a similar transformation, becoming cooperative moshavim during the 1950s and 1960s. This change occurred despite opposition from the "Shared Headquarters", an organization attempting to preserve collective kibbutzim against the trend of privatization.

== Attractions ==
Natur is built on the ruins of an ancient Jewish village. Excavations near the moshav uncovered a synagogue dating to the Mishnah period, considered one of the most impressive synagogues found in the region. The community hosts art and craft studios, including Natur Farm, established in 2014, which serves as a cultural center and medicinal herb nursery offering workshops, accommodations, and views of the Golan Heights and Lake Kinneret. Nearby is the archaeological site of Umm el-Kanatir, home to a reconstructed ancient synagogue, as well as the tomb of Sheikh Marzuk.

== Geography ==
Natur is located in the southern Golan Heights, near one of the region’s largest streams, Nahal Samakh. It lies close to Moshavs Ramat Magshimim and Geshur, and is just 10 kilometers from Lake Kinneret. The community of Natur consists of religious and non-religious families, with approximately 1,000 people living there.

== Transportation ==
The Golan Regional Council operates twenty buses per day from Natur to the Israeli city of Tiberias. The bus line also stops at Ramat Magshimim, Haspin, Nov, Avnei Eitan, Eliad, Afik, Neot Golan, and Bnei Yehuda. The bus ride to Tiberias takes approximately 54 minutes.

== See also ==
- Israeli-occupied territories
