= Avnei Eitan =

Israeli settlement in the Golan Heights

Avnei Eitan: אבני איתן (Hebrew)

Hebrew transcription(s)
  - Official: Avne Eitan
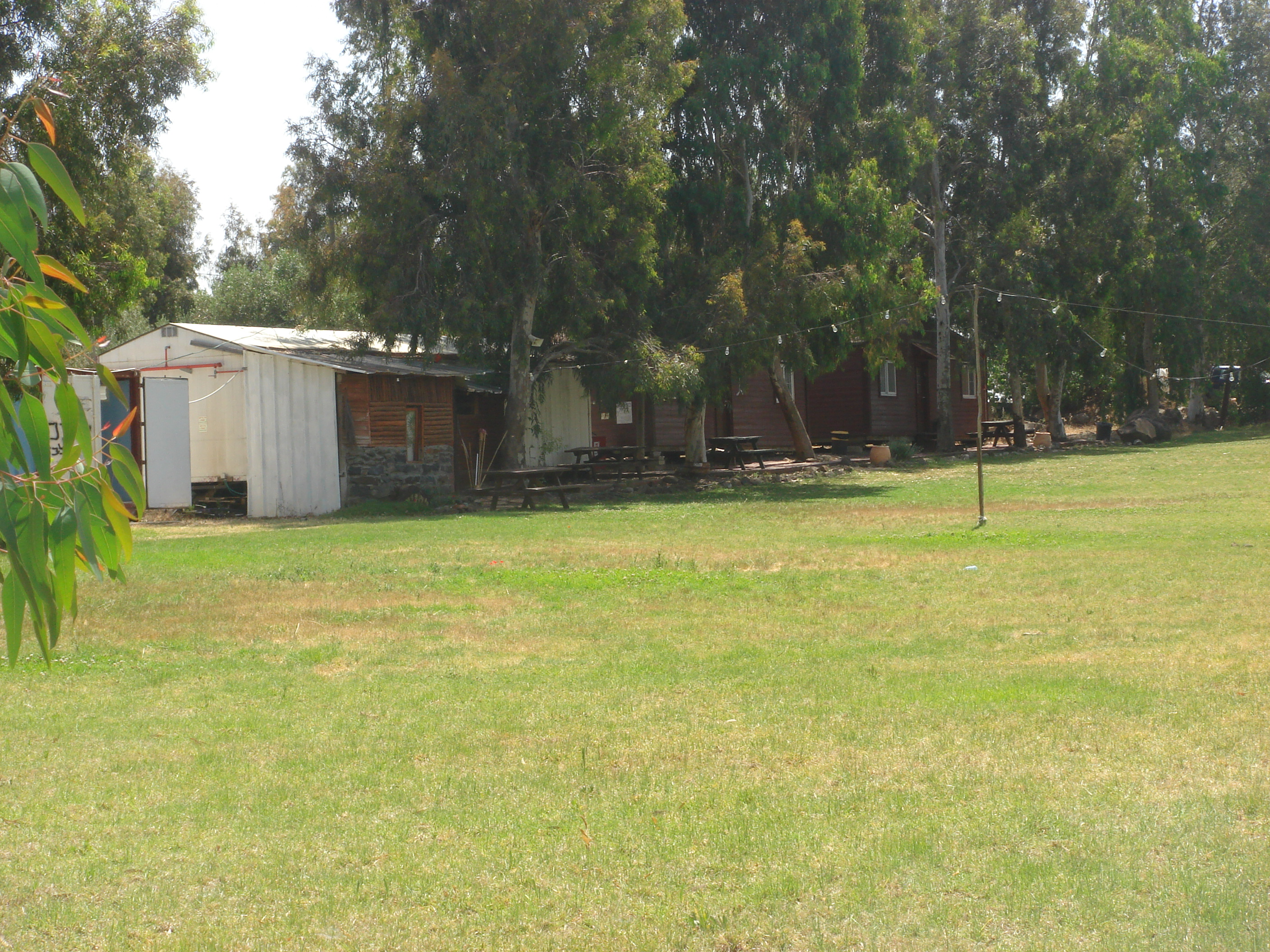
- Boarding house in Avnei Eitan

- Location within the Golan Heights Location within the Golan Heights
- Coordinates: 32°49′29″N 35°46′00″E
- Country: Golan Heights (Internationally recognized as Syrian territory occupied by Israel.)
- District: Northern
- Subdistrict: Golan
- Council: Golan
- Region: Golan Heights
- Affiliation: Hapoel HaMizrachi
- Population (2024): 1,078

Avnei Eitan (Hebrew: אַבְנֵי אֵיתָן) is an Israeli settlement organized as a moshav in the southern Golan Heights. It is located at an elevation of 385 meters (1,263 ft) above sea level. Located to the east of the Sea of Galilee, it falls under the municipal jurisdiction of Golan Regional Council. In 2024 it had a population of 1,078. It is part of the Hapoel HaMizrachi movement.

The international community considers Israeli settlements in the Golan Heights illegal under international law, but the Israeli government disputes this.

== History ==
Part of the families lived temporarily in the nearby settlement Nov, and later Avnei Eitan was founded in 1978. The settlement is named after seven people who died in the area, including five people killed when their jeep hit a mine in 1970. war victims including 3 soldiers that were killed in the Yom Kippur War, and a woman that deceased from a serious illness.

In December 1991, members of the moshav left the settlement and moved to live three kilometers east of it, near the ceasefire line fence between Israel and Syria. The moshav, which belongs to the Hapoel HaMizrachi movement, was shut down in protest of foreclosures on property and money carried out by the banks. Members that left the moshav burned tires at the entrance to the settlement and later confronted IDF officers, who demanded that they evacuate the place because they posed a security risk. Police forces, under the command of the Golan Heights Police Chief, back then Superintendent Shimon Koren, also arrived at the scene and addressed the strikers with a similar demand. At the same time, the police prevented roadblocks and major traffic routes in the Golan Heights. The Golan Heights police arrested four moshav members for questioning.

== Geography ==
The nearby stream, Nahal El Al (Hebrew) or Wadi Dafila (Arabic) is a popular hiking destination and contains the Black Waterfall, named for its black basalt rock and located closest to Avnei Eitan, and the White Waterfall, named for its white limestone rock.

== Details ==
Avnei Eitan is an Orthodox Jewish agricultural community in Gush Hispin, a bloc of religious communities in the southern Golan Heights. The moshav receives municipal services from the Golan Regional Council.

About 130 families live in Avnei Eitan, including families evicted from Gush Katif, mainly from Netzer Hazani and Kfar Darom.

The community has hosted the Mechinat Avnei Eitan pre-military yeshiva, also known as the "Leadership Yeshiva Academy," attended mainly by English-speaking overseas students. Many graduates of the school serve in elite units in the Israel Defense Forces.

== Transportation ==
The Golan Regional Council operates twenty buses per day from Avnei Eitan to the Israeli city of Tiberias. The bus line begins at Natur, and also stops at Ramat Magshimim, Haspin, Nov, Eliad, Afik, Neot Golan, and Bnei Yehuda. The bus ride to Tiberias takes approximately 40 minutes. Egged also operates eight buses per day from Avnei Eitan to Beit She'an (and ultimately all the way to Jerusalem). Avnei Eitan is also located close to Highway 98, the primary road through the Golan Heights.

== See also ==
- Israeli-occupied territories
