= Eliad (Israeli settlement) =

Israeli settlement in the Golan Heights

Eli-ad אֵלִי־עַד
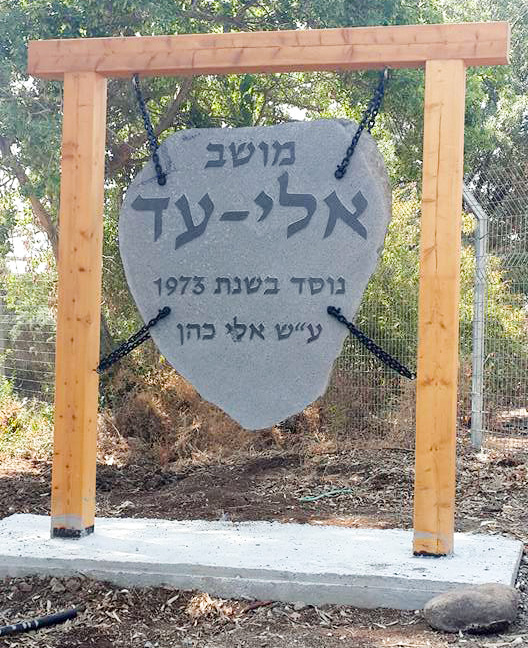
- A sign at the entrance to Eli-ad

- Location within the Golan Heights Location within the Golan Heights
- Coordinates: 32°48′18″N 35°44′3″E
- Country: Golan Heights (Internationally recognized as Syrian territory occupied by Israel.)
- District: Northern
- Subdistrict: Golan
- Council: Golan Regional Council
- Region: Golan Heights
- Affiliation: Moshavim Movement
- Founded: 1968
- Founder: Nahal
- Population (2024): 594

Eli-ad (Hebrew: אֵלִי־עַד) is an Israeli settlement organized as a moshav in the southern Golan Heights. It falls under the jurisdiction of Golan Regional Council and in 2024 had a population of 594.

The international community considers Israeli settlements in the Golan Heights illegal under international law, but the Israeli government disputes this.

== History ==
Israel captured the area from Syria in June 1967 in the Six-Day War. In 1968 as a Nahal settlement was founded, and became a moshav two years later. It was originally called El Al (Hebrew: אֶל עָל), "skyward", the same as Israel's national airline El Al (as an alteration of the name of the Arab village of Al ‘Al = "the high place"), and later renamed Eli Al (Hebrew: אֵלִי עַל), before assuming its current name. It is named in memory of the initially successful Israeli spy Eli Cohen, who was captured and hanged in Syria.

== Transportation ==
The Golan Regional Council operates twenty buses per day from Eliad to the Israeli city of Tiberias. The bus line begins at Natur, and also stops at Ramat Magshimim, Haspin, Nov, Avnei Eitan, Afik, Neot Golan, and Bnei Yehuda. The bus ride to Tiberias takes approximately 39 minutes. Egged also operates eight buses per day from Eliad to Beit She'an (and ultimately all the way to Jerusalem). Eliad is also located close to Highway 98, the primary road through the Golan Heights.

== Landmarks ==
Eliad is home to the Château Golan winery.

The nearby stream, Nahal El Al (Hebrew) or Wadi Dafila (Arabic) is a popular hiking destination and contains the Black Waterfall, named for its black basalt rock and situated closer to Avnei Eitan, and the downstream White Waterfall, named for its white limestone rock and located next to Eliad.

== See also ==
- Israeli-occupied territories
