= Nov (Israeli settlement) =

Israeli settlement in the Golan Heights

Nov: נוֹב (Hebrew)
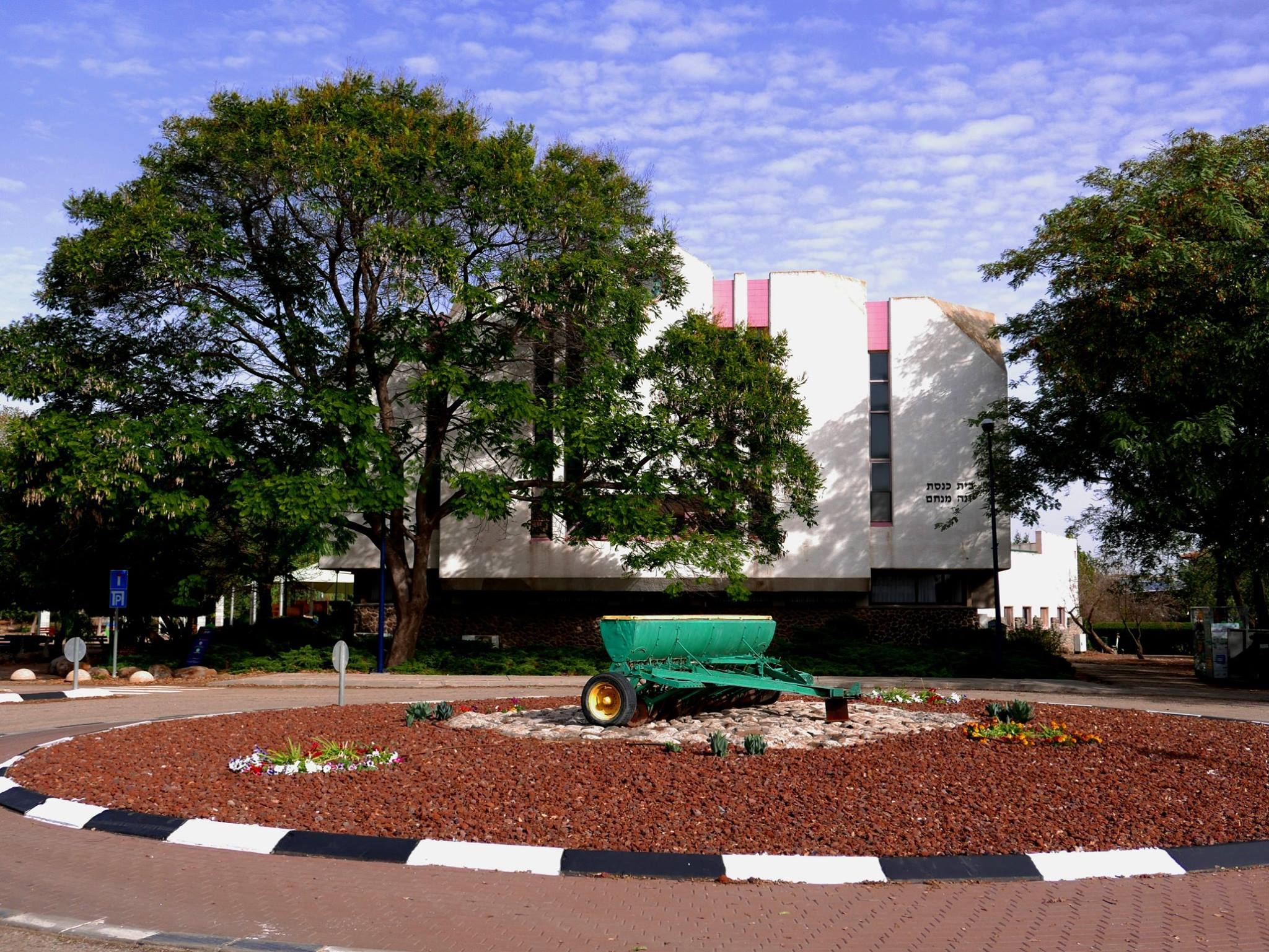

- Location within the Golan Heights Location within the Golan Heights
- Coordinates: 32°49′57″N 35°46′59.15″E
- Country: Golan Heights (Internationally recognized as Syrian territory occupied by Israel.)
- District: Northern
- Subdistrict: Golan
- Council: Golan
- Region: Golan Heights
- Affiliation: Hapoel HaMizrachi
- Founded: 1974
- Population (2024): 1,192

Nov (Hebrew: נוֹב) is an Israeli settlement and religious moshav in the southern Golan Heights. Located to the east of the Sea of Galilee, it falls under the municipal jurisdiction of Golan Regional Council. In 2024 it had a population of 1,192.

The international community considers Israeli settlements in the Golan Heights illegal under international law, but the Israeli and American governments dispute this.

== History ==
The site is mentioned in the 3rd century Mosaic of Rehob.

Until 1967 the site was home to the Syrian village of Mazraat Nab (Arabic: ناب), that had about 330 inhabitants before it was depopulated in 1967.

The Israeli settlement was established in 1974, and was named after a village on the site mentioned in the Jerusalem Talmud.

== Transportation ==
The Golan Regional Council operates twenty buses per day from Nov to the Israeli city of Tiberias. The bus line begins at Natur, and also stops at Ramat Magshimim, Haspin, Avnei Eitan, Eliad, Afik, Neot Golan, and Bnei Yehuda. The bus ride to Tiberias takes approximately 42 minutes. Egged also operates eight buses per day from Nov to Beit She'an (and ultimately all the way to Jerusalem). Nov is also located close to Highway 98, the primary road through the Golan Heights.

== Notable people ==
- Effi Eitam

== See also ==
- Israeli-occupied territories
