= Haspin =

Israeli settlement in the Golan Heights

Haspin: חַסְפִּין (Hebrew)
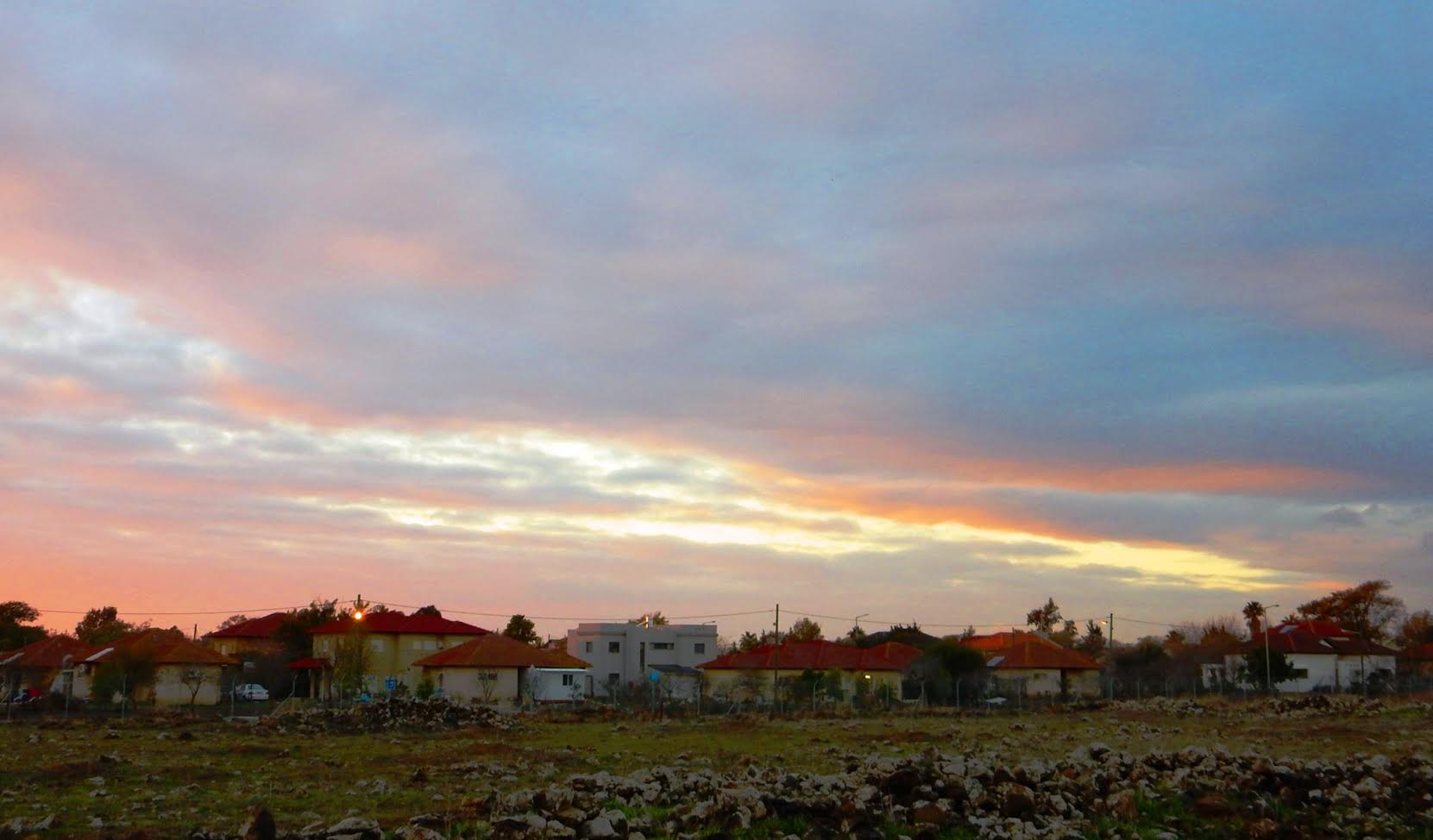

- Location within the Golan Heights Location within the Golan Heights
- Coordinates: 32°50′42″N 35°47′33″E
- Country: Golan Heights (Internationally recognized as Syrian territory occupied by Israel.)
- District: Northern
- Subdistrict: Golan
- Council: Golan
- Founded: 1978
- Population (2024): 1,956

Haspin (Hebrew: חַסְפִּין), widely known as Hispin, is a religious Israeli settlement organized as a community settlement in the southern Golan Heights. The international community considers the settlement illegal under international law, but the Israeli government disputes this.

== History ==
The modern Haspin was established in 1978 at the site of the abandoned village Khisfin (Arabic: خسفين). During G. Schumacher's visit to the village in 1883, it was inhabited by about 270 people, living in some 60 huts. Three-fourths of the village already lay waste or deserted.

Haspin now falls under the municipal jurisdiction of the Golan Regional Council. In 2024 the village had a population of 1,956. Yeshivat HaGolan, a Hesder Yeshiva is located in the town.

In antiquity, Haspin (Khisfin) is first mentioned in sources describing the military exploits of Judas Maccabeus (I Maccabbees 5:26), under the name Chaspho. The town features prominently in the early rabbinic writings of the 3rd century CE (corresponding with the late Roman-early Byzantine period), under the name Hisfiyya. It is also mentioned in the 3rd century-4th century Mosaic of Rehob, listed among the 'forbidden' towns within the territory of Susita. This designation indicates that, according to rabbinic standards, the town was subject to Jewish shmita regulations applicable within the Land of Israel. By the late sixth to early seventh centuries, the Jewish population in the village had likely diminished, with the town's residents being replaced by Samaritans and Christians.

== Geographical description ==
Haspin lies on the northern border of the most productive agricultural region of the southern Golan Heights, which, in ages past, was part of the main road leading up from Hamat Gader and from the Yarmuk valley to the northern regions of the Golan (Jaulan) as far as Hauran. An ancient Roman road criss-crossed the region. The area is rich in natural springs.

== Transportation ==
The Golan Regional Council operates twenty buses per day from Haspin to the Israeli city of Tiberias. The bus line begins at Natur, and also stops at Ramat Magshimim, Nov, Avnei Eitan, Eliad, Afik, Neot Golan, and Bnei Yehuda. The bus ride to Tiberias takes approximately 43 minutes. Egged also operates eight buses per day from Haspin to Beit She'an (and ultimately all the way to Jerusalem). Haspin is also located close to Highway 98, the primary road through the Golan Heights.

== Archaeology ==
Many ancient artefacts from the Roman and Byzantine periods have been unearthed in Haspin. An ancient doorpost stone featuring a three-branched menorah and a lintel adorned with symbols typically associated with Jewish public structures, such as a palm-tree, rosettes, grapevines, and a garland with a Hercules' knot, were found during an archaeological survey at Haspin.

Sir Laurence Oliphant, who visited the area on 15 March 1885, described the remains of a large fort, measuring 68 yards (62 m) x 54 yards (49 m) (the outer wall) and the thickness of the wall that surrounded it measuring 9 feet (2.7 m) in diameter, nestled between Haspin and Nâb. This is probably the fortified caravanserai (khan) described by Gottlieb Schumacher in his book The Jaulân, situated west of the town of Haspin. According to Oliphant, the fortress dates from the Early Arab period, and was used by the Crusaders in a later period. Its location is currently unknown.

== Notable people ==
- Maximus the Confessor, Christian monk, theologian and scholar, is said to have been born in the area (Khifsin), though this is disputed.
- Bezalel Smotrich, leader of the Religious Zionist Party and former Israeli Minister of Transportation, was born in Haspin.
- Netanel Kula, the Chief Military Censor.

== See also ==
- Israeli-occupied territories
