= Nimrod (Israeli settlement) =

Israeli settlement in the Golan Heights

Nimrod: נִמְרוֹד (Hebrew)
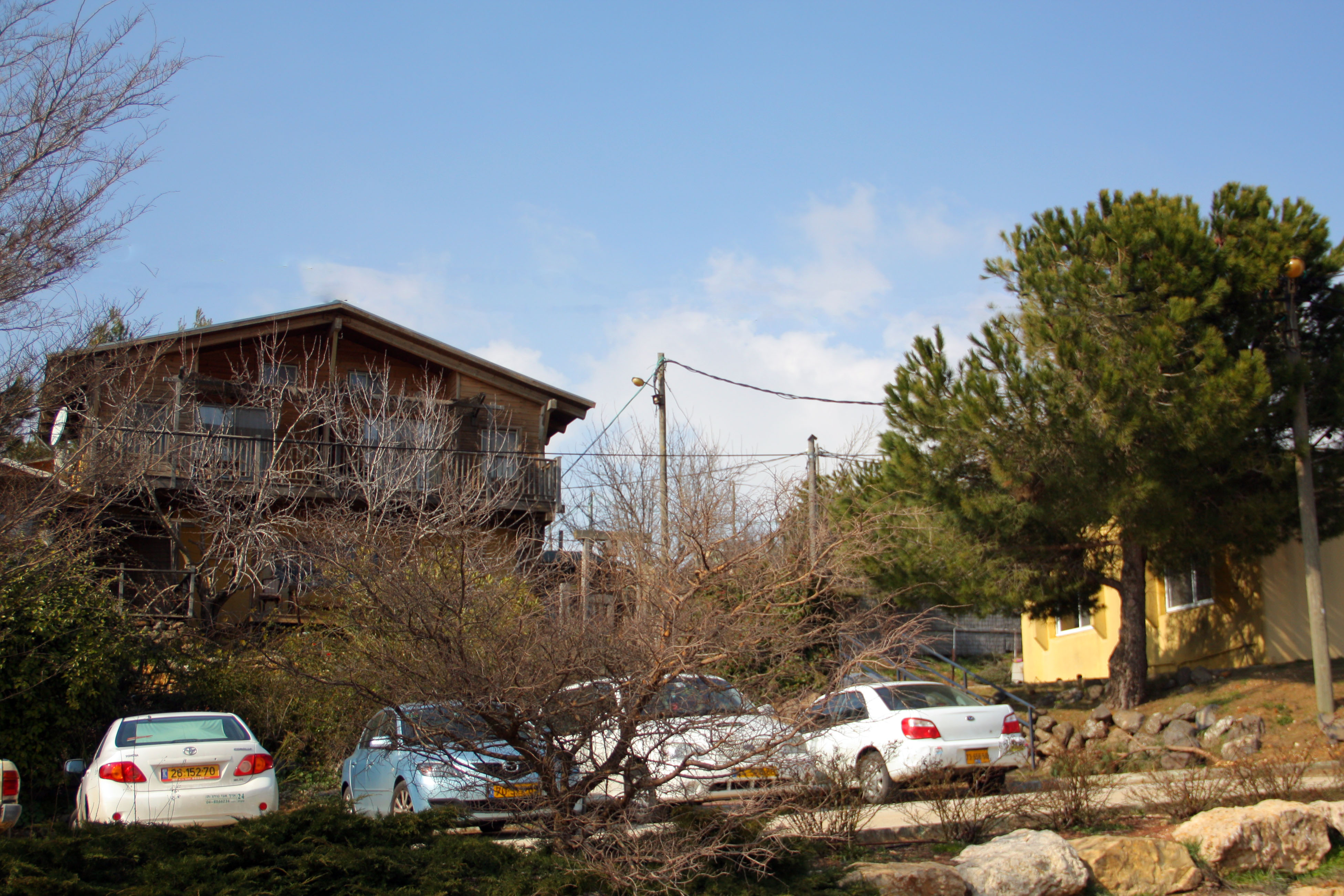
- Houses in Nimrod

- Location within the Golan Heights Location within the Golan Heights
- Coordinates: 33°14′43″N 35°45′05″E
- Country: Golan Heights (Internationally recognized as Syrian territory occupied by Israel.)
- District: Northern
- Subdistrict: Golan
- Council: Golan
- Region: Golan Heights
- Founded: 1982
- Population (2019): 16

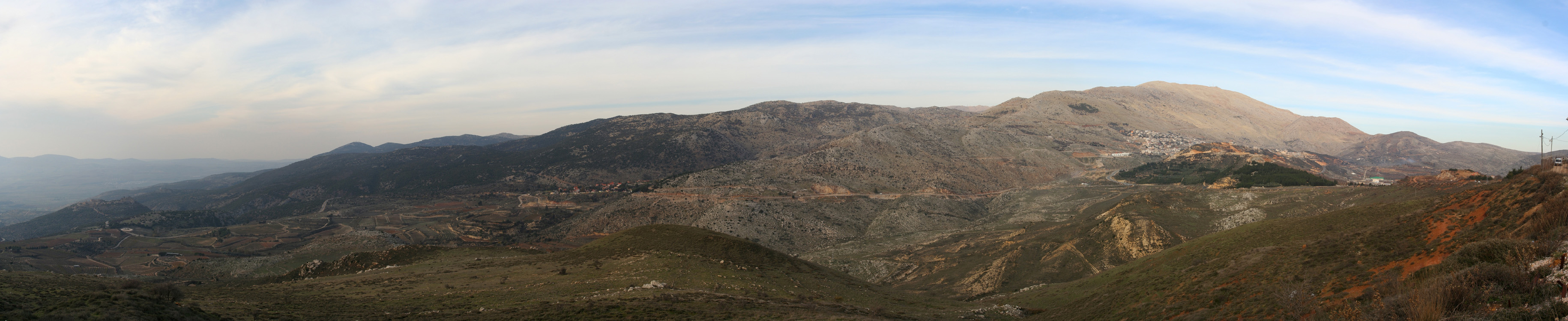
View of Mount Hermon from the village

Nimrod (Hebrew: נִמְרוֹד) is a small Israeli settlement organized as a moshav, in the Golan Heights on the southern slopes of Mount Hermon, and is the highest such civilian settlement in Israeli-controlled territory at 1,110 meters (3,640 ft) above sea level. Located near the Israeli settlement of Neve Ativ and the Druze towns of Majdal Shams, Mas'ade, and Ein Qiniyye, it falls under the jurisdiction of Golan Regional Council. In 2019 it had a population of 16.

The international community considers Israeli settlements in the Golan Heights illegal under international law, but the Israeli government disputes this.

== History ==
The settlement was originally established as a paramilitary Nahal outpost on 31 January 1982, with groundbreaking on that year's Israeli Independence Day. It was named after the nearby ancient Nimrod Fortress. Nimrod became a civilian town in January 1999, and in 2019 was home to five families. The village is centred on catering to tourists, and operates a restaurant and bungalows.

== See also ==
- Israeli-occupied territories
