= Hermon Natural Region =

Coordinates: 33°16′12″N 35°46′16″E

- Natural Region
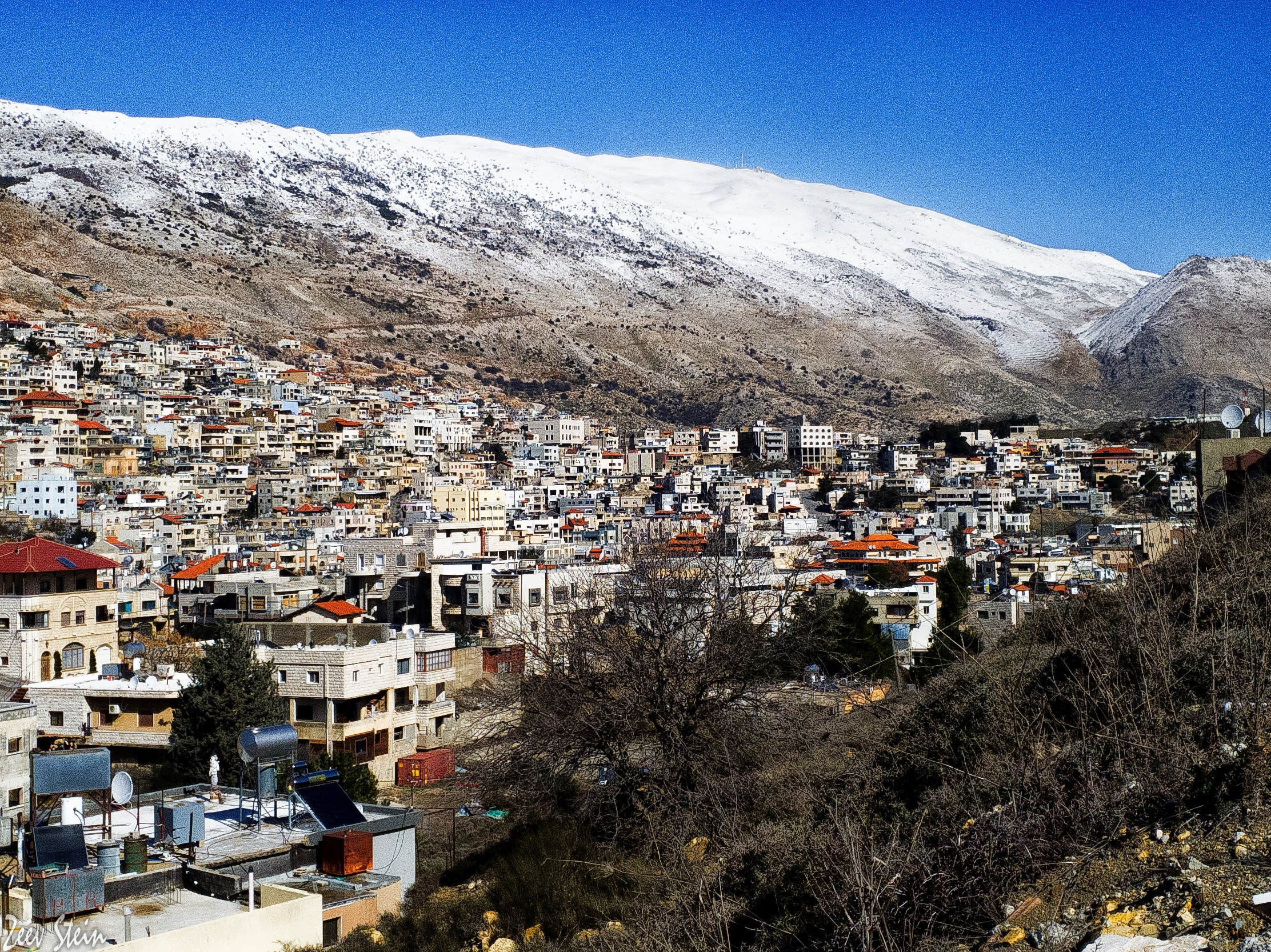
- View of Majdal Shams, the largest town in the Hermon Natural Region
- Interactive map of Hermon Natural Region
- Country: Israel
- District: Northern
- Subdistrict: Golan
- Largest City: Majdal Shams

Area
  - Total: 99 km^{2} (38 sq mi)

Population (2024)
  - Total: 13,960

Ethnicity
  - Jews and others: 1.5%
  - Arabs: 98.1%

The Hermon Natural Region is a natural region in the Golan Subdistrict, which is administered by Israel as part of its Northern District. Majdal Shams is the largest town in the natural region.

== Geography ==
Districts, Subdistricts and Natural Regions of the State of Israel, 2018

The natural region comprises the northernmost portion of the Golan Heights, north of Mas'ade and the Sa'ar Stream and east of Ghajar. It is overlooked by the eponymous Mount Hermon, the dominant natural feature of the area. It has an area of 99 km^{2}. The largest town in the natural region is Majdal Shams, the largest of the four Druze towns in the Golan, which contains 81 percent of the natural region's population. The only other communities in the Natural Region are Ein Qiniyye, a local council, and Neve Ativ and Nimrod, two villages of the Golan Regional Council.

== Demographics ==
At 98 percent Arab (almost all of whom are Druze), the natural region has the largest proportion of Arabs of any officially designated natural region in Israel. Majdal Shams and Ein Qiniyye are populated by Druze, while Neve Ativ and Nimrod are populated by Jews.

Historical population
Year	Pop.	±%
1983	6,400	—
1995	8,900	+39.1%
2008	11,300	+27.0%
2022	13,680	+21.1%
2024	13,960	+2.0%

== Administrative local authorities ==
Cities	Local Councils	Villages
[None]	Ein Qiniyye; Majdal Shams	Golan: Neve Ativ; Nimrod

== Voting Patterns ==
In the 2022 election, 72 percent of voters in the natural region voted for the parties of the center-left coalition led by Yair Lapid, while 22 percent voted for the parties of the right-wing coalition led by Benjamin Netanyahu and 1 percent voted for the Arab parties.

In the 2026 election, 77 percent of voters in the natural region voted for the parties of the center-left coalition led by Gadi Eisenkot, while 11 percent voted for the parties of the right-wing coalition led by Benjamin Netanyahu and 2 percent voted for the Arab parties. An additional 1.8 percent voted for the Reservists, and 0.4 percent voted for Amcha Yisrael. Voter turnout increased 358 percent from the 2022 election, by far the largest increase of any natural region in Israel, which is mostly attributable to the surge in Israeli citizenship among the Golan Druze as a result of the fall of the Assad regime and the 2025 massacres of Druze in southern Syria.
