= Netanel Kula =

Israeli military officer and Chief Military Censor

- נתנאל קולה
- Born: 1977 (age 48–49); Hispin, Israel
- Military career
- Allegiance: Israel
- Branch: Israel Defense Forces
- Rank: Brigadier general
- Commands: Chief Intelligence Officer of Central Command; Chief Military Censor

Netanel Kula (Hebrew: נתנאל קולה; born 1977) is an Israeli military officer with the rank of brigadier general in the Israel Defense Forces (IDF), serving as the Chief Military Censor.

== Biography ==
Kula was born and raised in Hispin, Israel. He is the son of Dina and Asher Kula, a retired deputy president of the Nazareth District Court. His father serves as the Judicial Ombudsman.

Kula served in the Israeli Intelligence Corps and held the position of Chief Intelligence Officer of the IDF's Central Command.

In 2021, he was among the first three Israeli military officers to make an official visit to Morocco following the Abraham Accords and the establishment of diplomatic relations between Israel and Morocco.

In April 2025, Israeli Minister of Defense Israel Katz announced Kula's appointment as Chief Military Censor, succeeding Kobi Mandelblit. Upon assuming the position, he was promoted to the rank of brigadier general.

Kula holds a bachelor's degree in law from the Interdisciplinary Center Herzliya (now Reichman University) and a master's degree in business administration from Ono Academic College.
