= Umm el-Qanatir =

Archaeological site in the Golan Heights

- ام القناطر (Arabic)
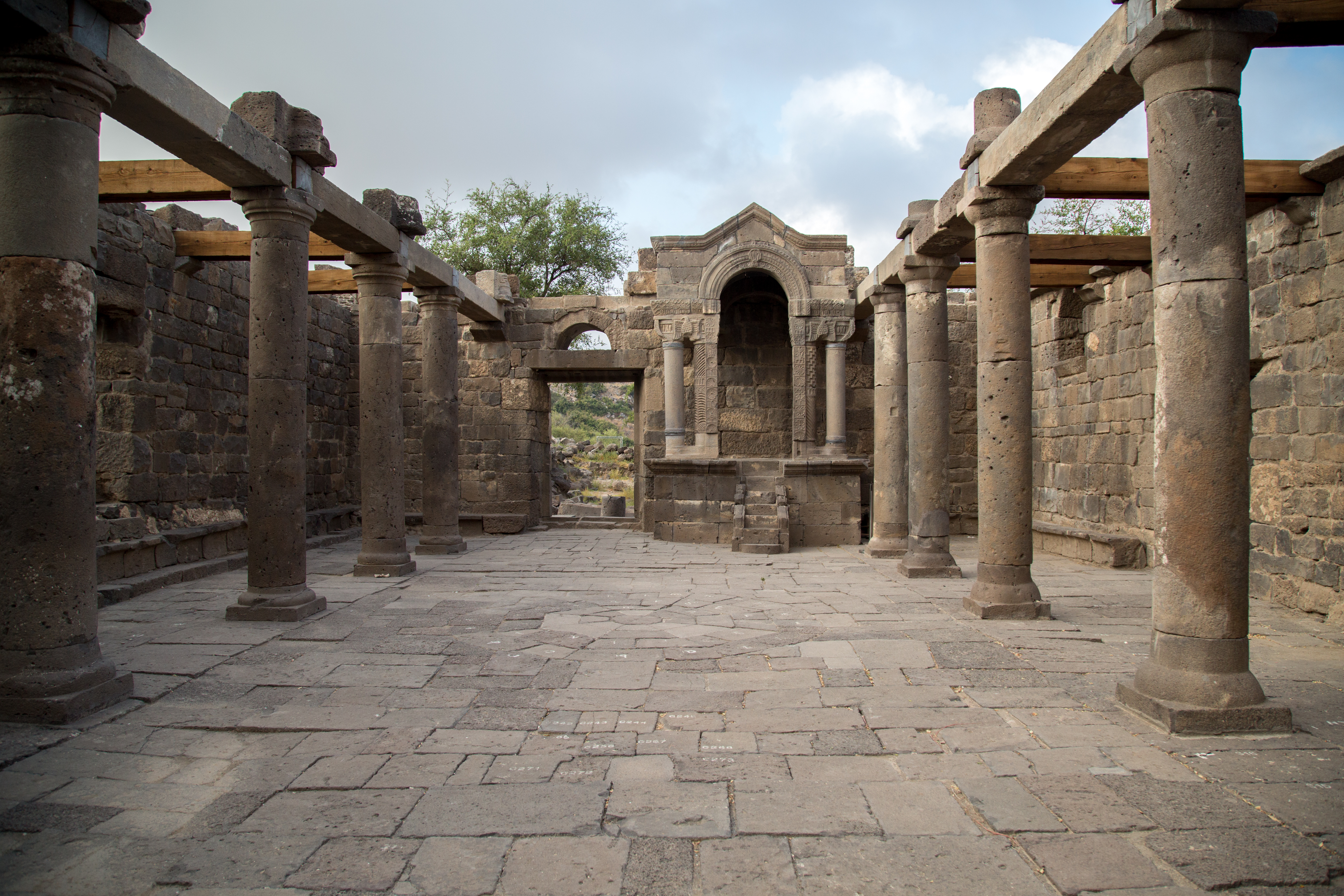
- Partially reconstructed synagogue, in 2016

- Location of the ancient former synagogue in the Golan Heights

Religion
- Affiliation: Judaism (former)
- Ecclesiastical or organisational status: Ancient synagogue; Archaeological site
- Status: Ruins; partially reconstructed

Location
- Location: Golan Heights
- Coordinates: 32°50′58.92″N 35°44′16.18″E
- Hebrew: עין קשתות (Ein Keshatot)
- Type: Settlement
- Periods: Roman period to Umayyad period
- Cultures: Hellenistic, Pagan, Jewish

History
- Abandoned: 749 CE

Site notes
- Archaeologists: Yehoshua "Yeshu" Dray (reconstruction)
- Public access: Yes

Umm el-Qanatir, also spelled Umm el-Kanatir (Arabic: ام القناطر, romanized: Umm al-Qanāṭir, lit. 'mother of the arches'), known as Ein Keshatot (Hebrew: עין קשתות, lit. 'spring of the arches') in Israel, is an archaeological site, located on the Israeli-occupied Golan Heights, whose main phase is dated to the mid-5th–8th centuries. Excavations have revealed a Roman-period Pagan and later Jewish settlement, who left behind the ruins of a synagogue when they abandoned the town after it being destroyed by the catastrophic 749 earthquake. The archaeological site is located 10 km (6.2 mi) east of the Dead Sea Transform, and 1 km (0.62 mi) southwest of Natur.

Identification attempts based on Jewish sources have led to two possible ancient names: Kantur, mentioned by Rabbi Menachem di Luzano in his book Ma'arikh (16th/early 17th century); and Qamtra, the name of a place mentioned in the Talmud and with a Jewish past dating back to the Byzantine period.

== Etymology ==
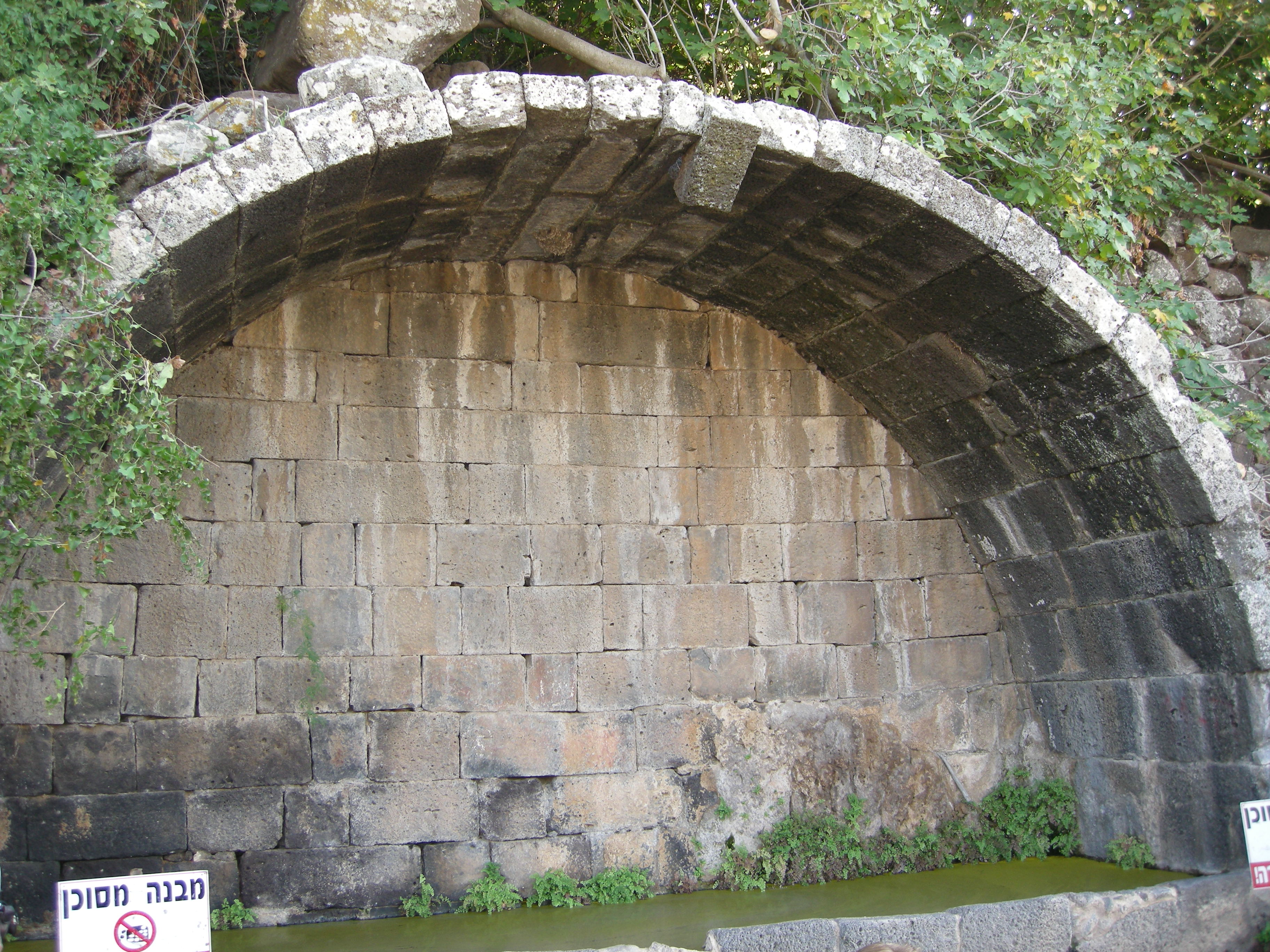
Basalt arch over the spring

The Arabic word qantara, pl. qanatir, can mean arch, a bridge built of stone or masonry, an aqueduct or a dam, and a high building. The name of the site derives from its location 200 metres from a natural spring that flows from the cliff into three basins that were once topped by monumental basalt arches, one of which has survived.

Some Israeli authorities are starting to use the new Hebrew name of Ein Keshatot ("Spring of the Arches"), such as seen on official postage stamps. The site is also being advertised as Rehavam's Arches, so named after former Israeli Minister of Tourism, Rehavam Ze'evi.

== History ==
=== Ancient town: Pagan, then Jewish ===
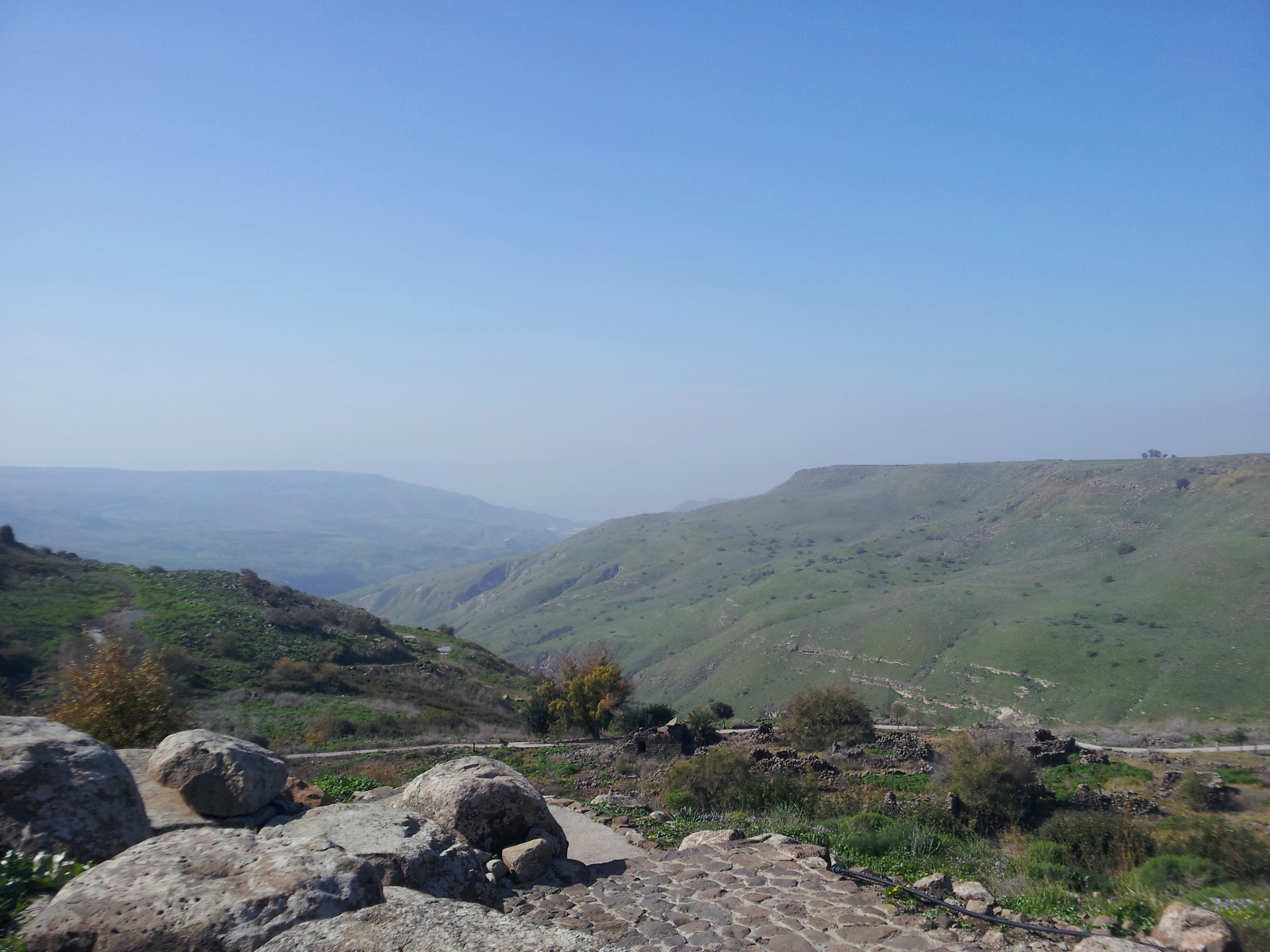
View from Umm el-Qanatir towards south west

The site is believed to have been a Pagan Roman town that venerated the nearby spring. Jews began to settle in the vicinity in 23 BCE. Early Jewish inhabitants of Umm el-Qanatir established a flax industry there, using the water for washing and whitening flax from which they wove fine cloth. The textiles were sold to wealthy residents in the nearby towns of Sussita and Beit Saida. The villagers may have engaged in mixed farming, and raised sheep and olives, although no terracing has been found.

The catastrophic 749 earthquake brought the settlement to an end.

=== Syrian village ===
Local Syrian shepherds continued to inhabit the ruins of Umm el-Qanatir into the 1950s, reusing the carved stones. The Syrian census of 1960 listed a farm here with 90 inhabitants.

== Ancient synagogue ==
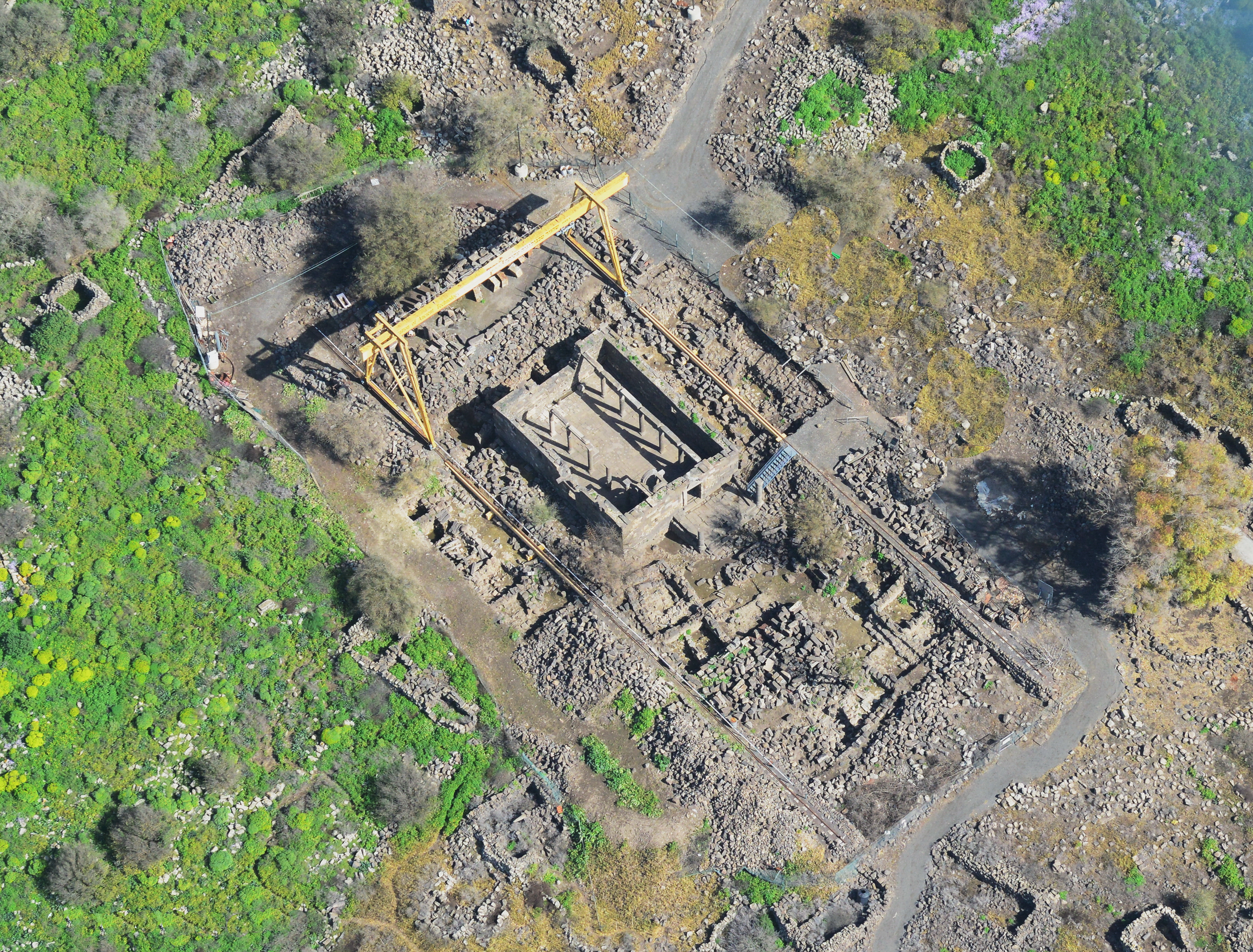
The ancient synagogue from the air, 2013

=== Use in antiquity (5th-8th century) ===
It was apparently in the fifth century that the Jewish residents built a large synagogue, which they embellished during the sixth century. The building was 18 meters (59 feet) long by 13 meters (43 feet) wide and calculated to have been 12 meters (39 feet) high, making it one of the largest of at least 25 ancient synagogues discovered in the region. It was destroyed in the Golan earthquake of 749, when the Jewish inhabitants left the shattered settlement.

=== Rediscovery ===
The existence of a synagogue at the site was first documented in 1884, by Laurence Oliphant and Gottlieb Schumacher. Amid ruined walls and large blocks of stone, Oliphant discovered a stone carving of a vulture, a fragment of a cornice, a large triangular slab that he believes was placed on the lintel of the main entrance and fragments of Corinthian capitals. The vulture, a well-known motif in ancient Jewish art, particularly in the Golan and Galilee, is visible on a double column and on the front gable of the synagogue and might come from the same workshop as the decorated Torah shrine base from 'En Samsam, another Golan Heights site.

=== Reconstruction ===
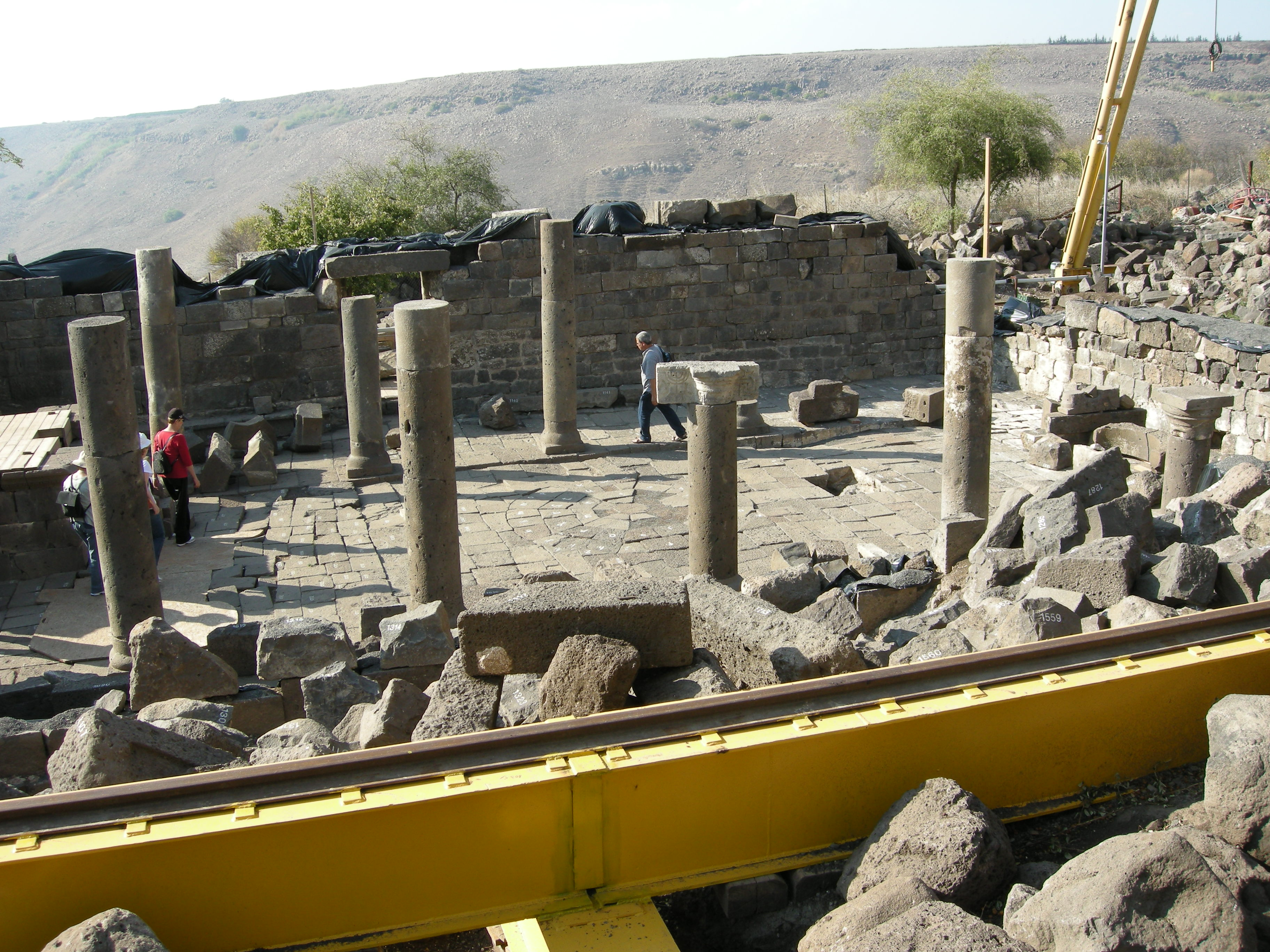
The synagogue reconstruction in progress, 2008

Reconstruction of the synagogue was completed by an Israeli consortium team, thanks to Yehoshua Dray and Haim Ben-David of Kinneret Academic College and Bar-Ilan University. The project, inaugurated in 2003, used special high-tech computer technology to code and digitally record the stones. Blocks were then labelled with RFID chips and a special crane lifted and inserted them in the correct sequence. With the help of this technology, the synagogue was restored with great accuracy.

== See also ==
- History of the Jews in Syria
- Oldest synagogues in the world
