= Buq'ata =

Druze town in the Israeli-occupied Syrian Golan Heights

Buq'ata بقعاثا בוקעאתא
- Town
- Buq'ata, with Mount Hermon in the background

- The Golan on the map of Syria; Buq'ata on the map of the Golan. Buq'ata (Syria) Buq'ata (the Golan Heights)
- Coordinates: 33°12′N 35°47′E
- Country: Golan Heights, internationally recognised as Syrian territory occupied by Israel. See Status of the Golan Heights.
- Israeli District: Northern
- Israeli Subdistrict: Golan
- Natural Region: Northern Golan
- Syrian Governorate: Quneitra Governorate
- Syrian District: Quneitra District
- Syrian Subdistrict: Mas'ade Subdistrict

Population (2024)
  - Total: 6,982

Buq'ata (Arabic: بقعاثا, romanized: Buqʿāthā; Hebrew: בוקעאתא) is a Druze town in the Golan Heights region, Quneitra Governorate, Syria. Since the 1967 Six-Day War, it has been under Israeli occupation and is administered by Israel as a local council in the Northern District. In 2024, Buq'ata had a population of 6,982.

While residents historically maintained allegiance to Syria like their fellow Golan Druze, the town has seen accelerated integration and a sharp rise in Israeli naturalization amid growing insecurity and persecution of Syrian Druze following the Suwayda massacres.

== Geography ==
Buq'ata is one of the four remaining Syrian-Druze communities on the Israeli-occupied portion of the Golan Heights, alongsided Majdal Shams, Ein Qiniyye and Mas'ade.

Located in the northern area of the Golan between Mount Hermonit and Mount Varda at an elevation of 1,070 metres above sea level, Buq'ata covers an area of 7,000 dunams (7km^{2}) on a volcanic basalt plateau.

== History ==
The presence of Druze around Mount Hermon is documented since the founding of the Druze religion in the beginning of the 11th century. Buq'ata was founded in the 1880s by families from the neighboring town of Majdal Shams. It was established on a late antique and medieval settlement where sherds from the Roman, Byzantine and Mamluk periods were found. Greek inscriptions were discovered at the village.

Buq'ata was destroyed in 1888 during a series of feuds between rival villages in the area, and again in 1925, during the Great Syrian Revolt against the French mandatory rule. It became part of independent Syria in 1946.

In the course of the Six-Day War in 1967, the town was captured by Israel.

Buq'ata achieved Israeli local council status in 1982.

In 2012, amid the Syrian civil war, residents loyal to President Bashar al-Assad clashed with Syrian opposition activists.

== Demography ==
Historical population
Year	Pop.	±%
1983	3,200	—
1995	4,000	+25.0%
2008	5,700	+42.5%
2022	6,720	+17.9%
2024	6,983	+3.9%

According to data compiled by Israel's Central Bureau of Statistics in 2001, Buq'ata ranked 2 out of 10 on the national socioeconomic index. In 2000, 72.5% of Grade 12 students graduated with a Bagrut matriculation certificate. In 2021, 98.9% of students matriculated, 2nd best in the country, though only 1.1% did so at the maximum level of mathematics and English studies, 9th worst in the country.

=== Citizenship and residency ===
The 1981 Golan Heights Law, which effectively annexed the territory to Israel, granted Golan Druze the right to apply for Israeli citizenship. The vast majority rejected naturalization in favor of permanent residency and retaining Syrian citizenship. Following the 2011 outbreak of the Syrian Civil War and the subsequent 2024 collapse of the Assad regime, Golan Druze increasingly became Israeli citizens. The July 2025 Suwayda massacre of Druze in Syria, which community leaders blamed on forces loyal to Syrian president Ahmed al-Sharaa, further accelerated integration with Israel and deepened alienation from Syria. By March 2026, 41% of Buq'ata's residents had become Israeli citizens according to Israel's Ministry of the Interior.

== Economy ==
The local economy is predominantly agricultural, with apples and grapes being the main crops. In 2013, Buq'ata harvested 55,000 tons of apples, which it sold to markets in Israel or Syria.

== Transportation ==
Buq'ata is situated along Highway 98, the primary north–south route in the Golan Heights. The town is served by regional bus lines connecting it to neighboring communities and nearby hubs such as Kiryat Shmona.

== Voting Patterns ==
In the 2026 election, 80 percent of voters in Buq'ata voted for the parties of the center-left coalition led by Gadi Eisenkot, while 15 percent voted for the parties of the right-wing coalition led by Benjamin Netanyahu and 1.4 percent voted for the Arab parties. An additional 1.1 percent voted for the Reservists. Voter turnout more than quintupled compared to the 2022 election, one of the largest increases of any town in Israel (the only other comparable towns are the three other Druze towns in the Golan), which is mostly attributable to the surge in Israeli citizenship among the Golan Druze as a result of the fall of the Assad regime and the 2025 massacres of Druze in southern Syria.

== See also ==
- Druze in Syria
- Status and position of Golan Heights Druze
