= Nimrod Castle =

Medieval fortress situated in the Golan Heights

Nimrod Fortress
- قلعة الصبيبة מבצר נמרוד
- Golan Heights
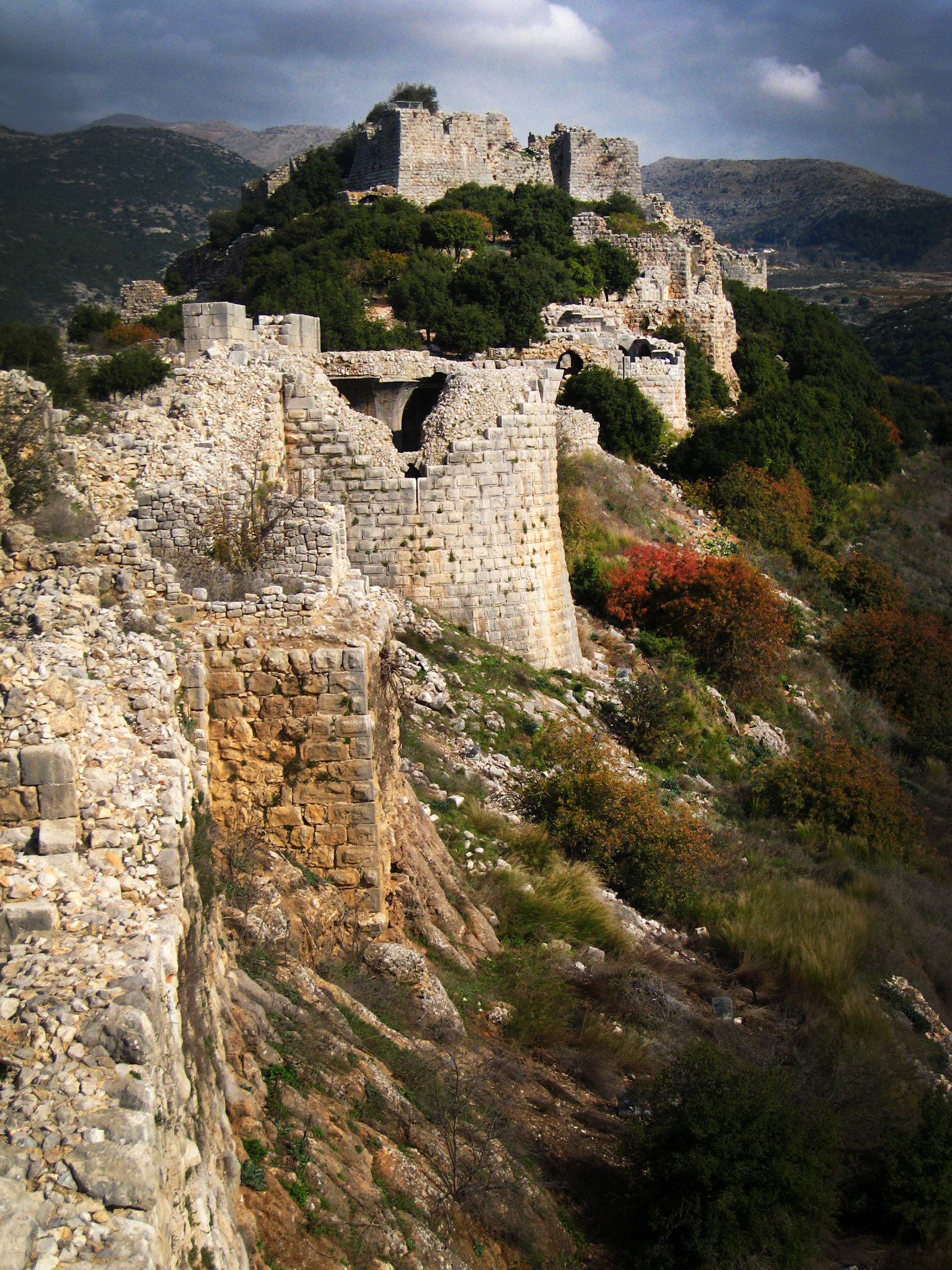

Site information
- Type: Castle
- Open to the public: April–September: 8 a.m. – 5 p.m. October–March: 8 a.m. – 4 p.m.

Location
- Location within the Golan Heights
- Coordinates: 33.252778°N 35.714722°E

Site history
- Built: Early structure : Hellenistic period (up to 30 AD)/Byzantine period (4th to 7th century AD); Late structure : Ayyubid period (12th and 13th century Between 1229 and 1290
- Built by: Early structure : Unknown; Late structure :Al-Aziz Uthman

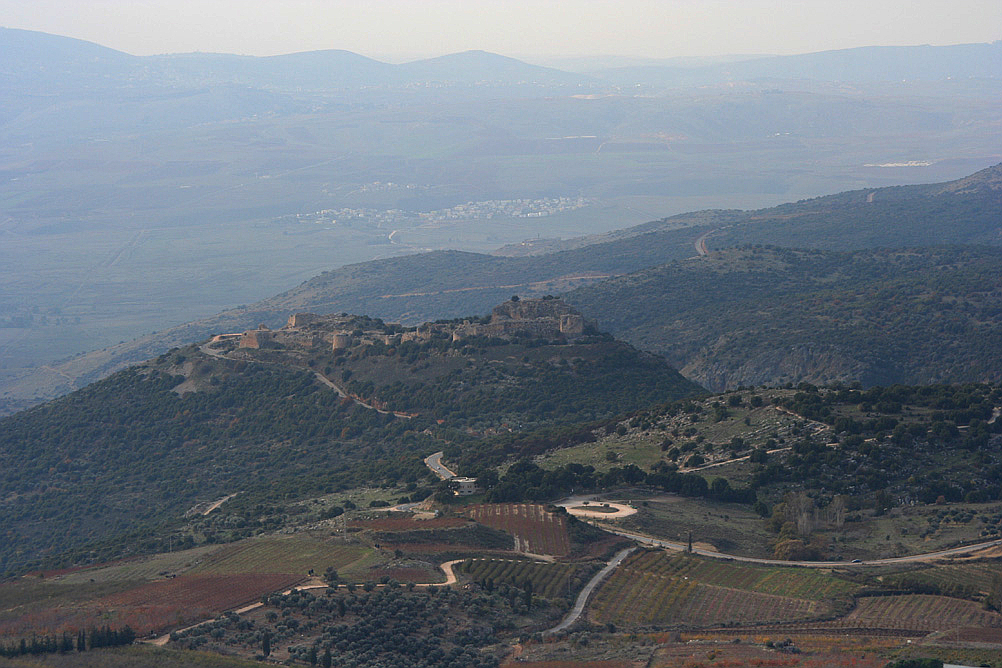
Nimrod Fortress

The Nimrod Fortress (Arabic: قلعة الصبيبة Qal'at al-Subeiba, "Castle of the Large Cliff", later Qal'at Namrud, "Nimrod's Castle"; Hebrew: מבצר נמרוד, Mivtzar Nimrod, "Nimrod's Fortress"), also called Nimrod Castle, is a castle built by the Ayyubids and greatly enlarged by the Mamluks, situated on the southern slopes of Mount Hermon, on a ridge rising about 800 m (2600 feet) above sea level. It overlooks the Golan Heights and was built with the purpose of guarding a major access route to Damascus against armies coming from the west.

Alternative forms and spellings include: Kal'at instead of Qal'at, the prefix as- instead of al-, and Subayba, Subaybah and Subeibeh in place of Subeiba. The association of the fortress with the biblical king, mighty warrior and hunter Nimrod, who entered post-koranic Islamic interpretive literature as Nimrud, came from the Druze, who only settled in the area in the 19th century.

The area is under Israeli occupation and administration since 1967 together with the adjacent Golan Heights. The international community sees the area as Syrian territory.

== History ==
=== Ancient (Hellenistic?) period ===
Based on archaeological findings (so-called "Massive masonry style" and other typical Hellenistic elements, followed by Crusader, Ayyubid, and Mamluk masonry styles) and the study of the effect of seismic events on the masonry, correlated with historical knowledge about the major regional earthquakes, researchers reached the conclusion that a first castle was probably built at the site by the ancient Greco-Syrians, i.e. during the Hellenistic period (after 332 BCE), but not by the Herodians or Romans (ruling the region from the 1st century BCE onward). The Phoenicians were also mentioned as a possibility by Edward Robinson in 1856. The earthquake which damaged the oldest masonry was identified as the catastrophic 749 event. Who the builders of the first castle exactly were must yet be archaeologically investigated.

=== Crusader period ===
Based on masonry and building style, first and foremost including the cross-shaped rib vaults of the Eastern Hall in the castle's inner section (a shape never utilised by the Muslims), Alon Margalit considers a Crusader building phase as firmly proven. The Crusader masonry shows signs of a different type of seismic damage, dated to the 1202 earthquake and absent from the later, Ayyubid and Mamluk masonry.

=== Ayyubids and Mongols ===
The fortress was rebuilt around 1228 by Al-Aziz Uthman, the son of Saladin's brother al-'Adil, to preempt an attack on Damascus by the armies of the Sixth Crusade. It was named Qal'at al-Subeiba, "Castle of the Large Cliff" in Arabic. The fortress was further expanded to contain the whole ridge by 1230. In 1260 the Mongols captured the castle, dismantled some of its defenses and left their ally, the son of Al-Aziz 'Uthman, in charge of it and the nearby town of Banias.

=== Mamluk period ===
After the subsequent Mamluk victory over the Mongols at the Battle of Ain Jalut, Sultan Baibars strengthened the castle and added larger towers. The fortress was given to Baibars's second-in-command, Bilik. The new governor started the broad construction activities. When the construction was finished, Bilik memorialized his work and glorified the name of the sultan in a 1275 inscription. After the death of Baibars, his son arranged for Bilik to be murdered, apparently because he feared his power.

At the end of the 13th century, following the Muslim conquest of the port city of Acre (Akko) and the end of Crusader rule in the Holy Land, the fortress lost its strategic value and fell into disrepair.

=== Ottoman period ===
The Ottoman Turks conquered the land in 1517 and used the fortress as a luxury prison for Ottoman nobles. The fortress was abandoned later in the 16th century and local shepherds and their flocks were the sole guests within its walls.

The fortress was significantly damaged by an earthquake in 1759 that hit the region.

Druze who came to the region during the 1860 conflict between themselves and the Maronites began calling it Qal'at Namrud (Nimrod's Castle).

== Description ==
The entire fortress complex is 420 m (1350 feet) in length and 150 m (500 feet) in width, and is built of large, carefully squared stones. Along the walls are numerous rectangular and semi-circular towers, roofed with pointed cross-arches.

Overlooking the high, eastern edge of the fortress stood a large keep, measuring 65 by 45 metres (200 by 150 feet) and protected by massive rectangular towers. Remains of several luxurious halls, water pools, rooms, suggest that this might have been the residence of the governor as well.

The fortress overlooks the deep, narrow valley that separates Mount Hermon from the rest of the Golan Heights, the road linking the Galilee with Damascus, and the former Crusader town of Banias.

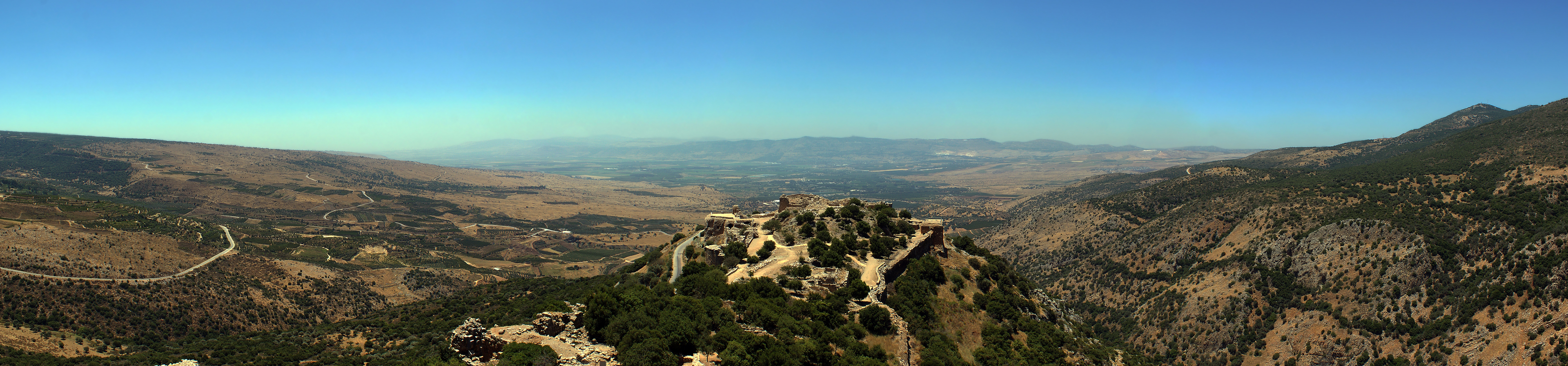
A panoramic photograph of Nimrod's Fortress, looking West.

== Current condition ==
The site is managed by the Israel Nature and Parks Authority, and visitors can explore the excavated and restored portions of the fortress.

The fortress entrance is from the west, and the first section contains "secret corridors"—winding staircases and underground water cisterns with some of the original plaster still visible. There are many examples of "loopholes" in fortress—special windows that are narrow on the outside but wide on the inside. They were designed specifically for shooting bows and arrows or crossbows, giving the defender inside the fortress plenty of room but the attacker only a narrow slit as a target. The central part, which is accessible by a path within the fortress, contains the remains of a keep surrounded by large rectangular towers. In the western section, there are the remains of an inner fortress, which was protected by its own moat and drawbridge. This is the oldest part of the castle.

The park entrance is located on Route 989 between Kiryat Shmona and Mount Hermon, about twenty minutes east of Kiryat Shmona.

Nimrod, an Israeli settlement, is located nearby.

In the Israeli film Beaufort, the castle substituted for Beaufort Castle, which is located in southern Lebanon.

== Gallery ==
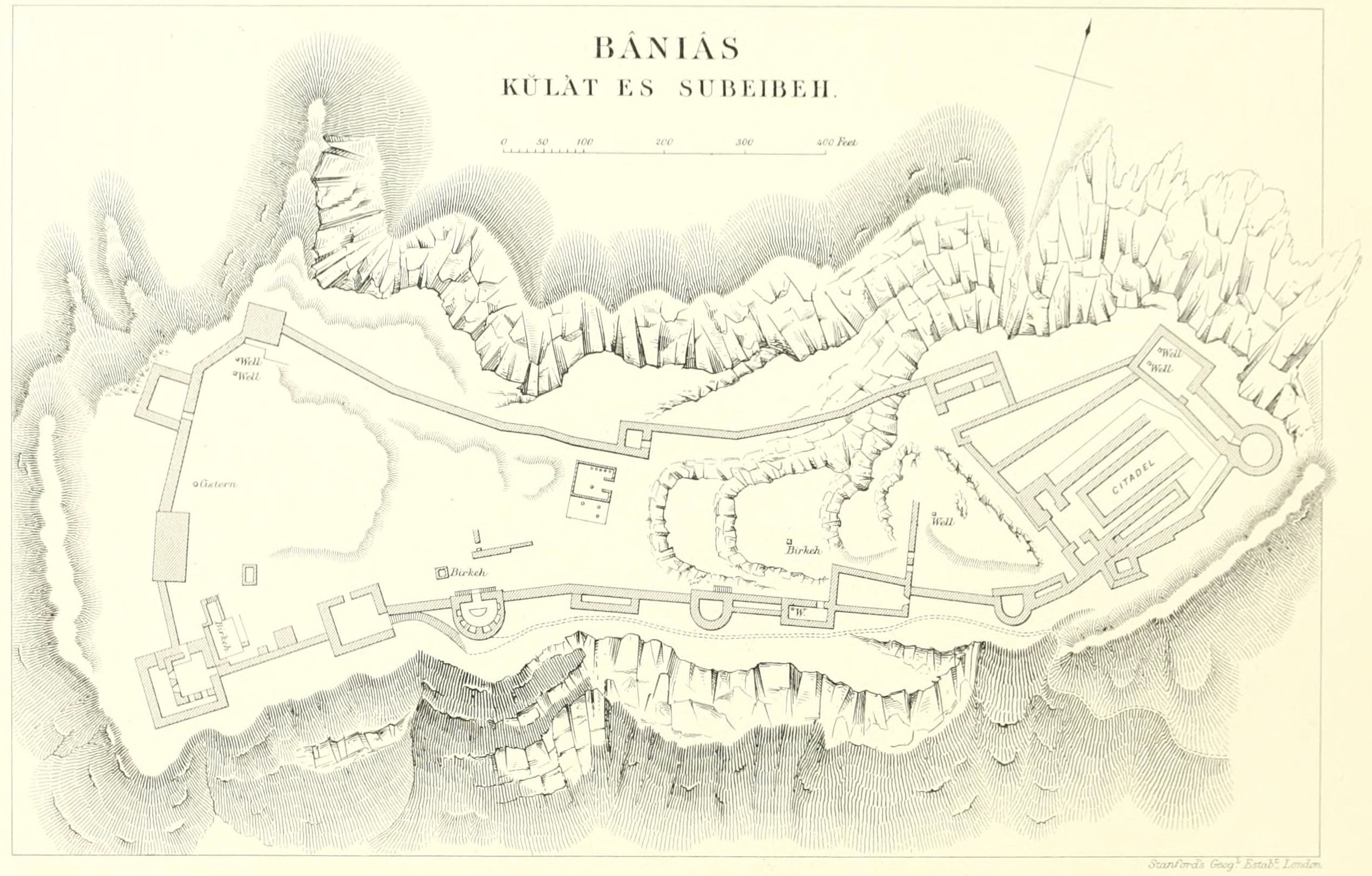
Plan from the 1871-77 PEF Survey of Palestine

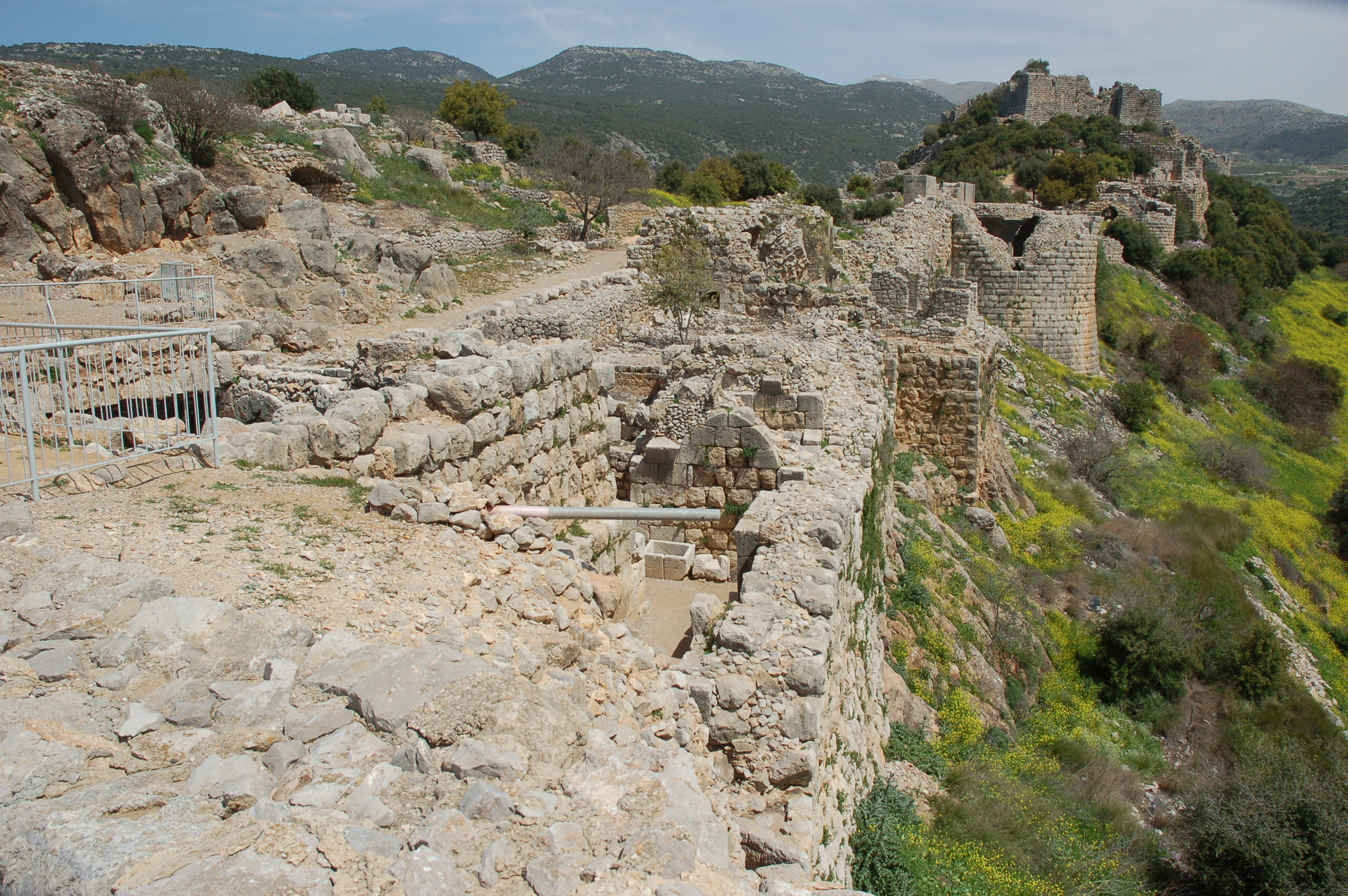
Nimrod Fortress - view towards the keep

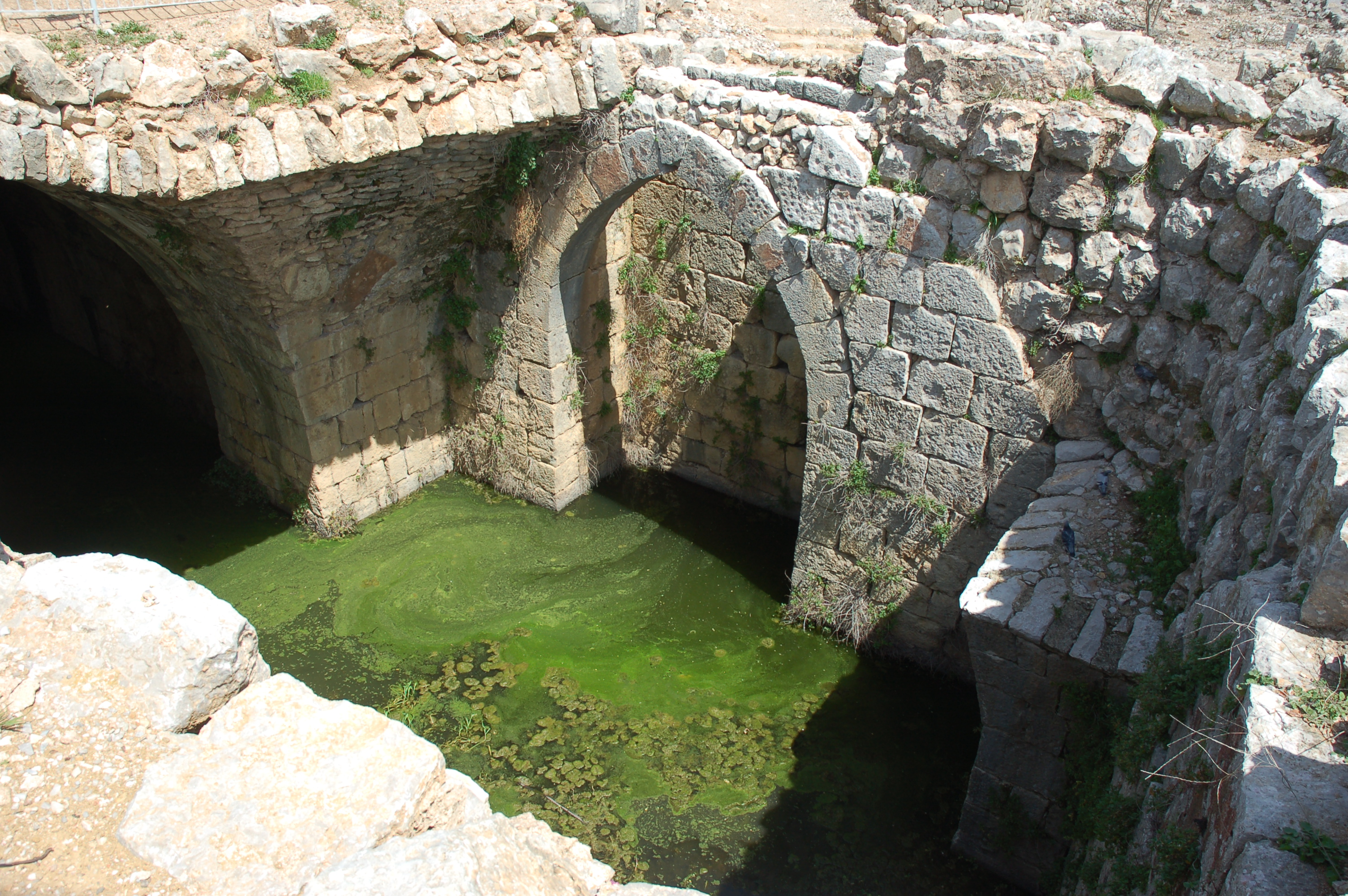
Nimrod Fortress - cistern

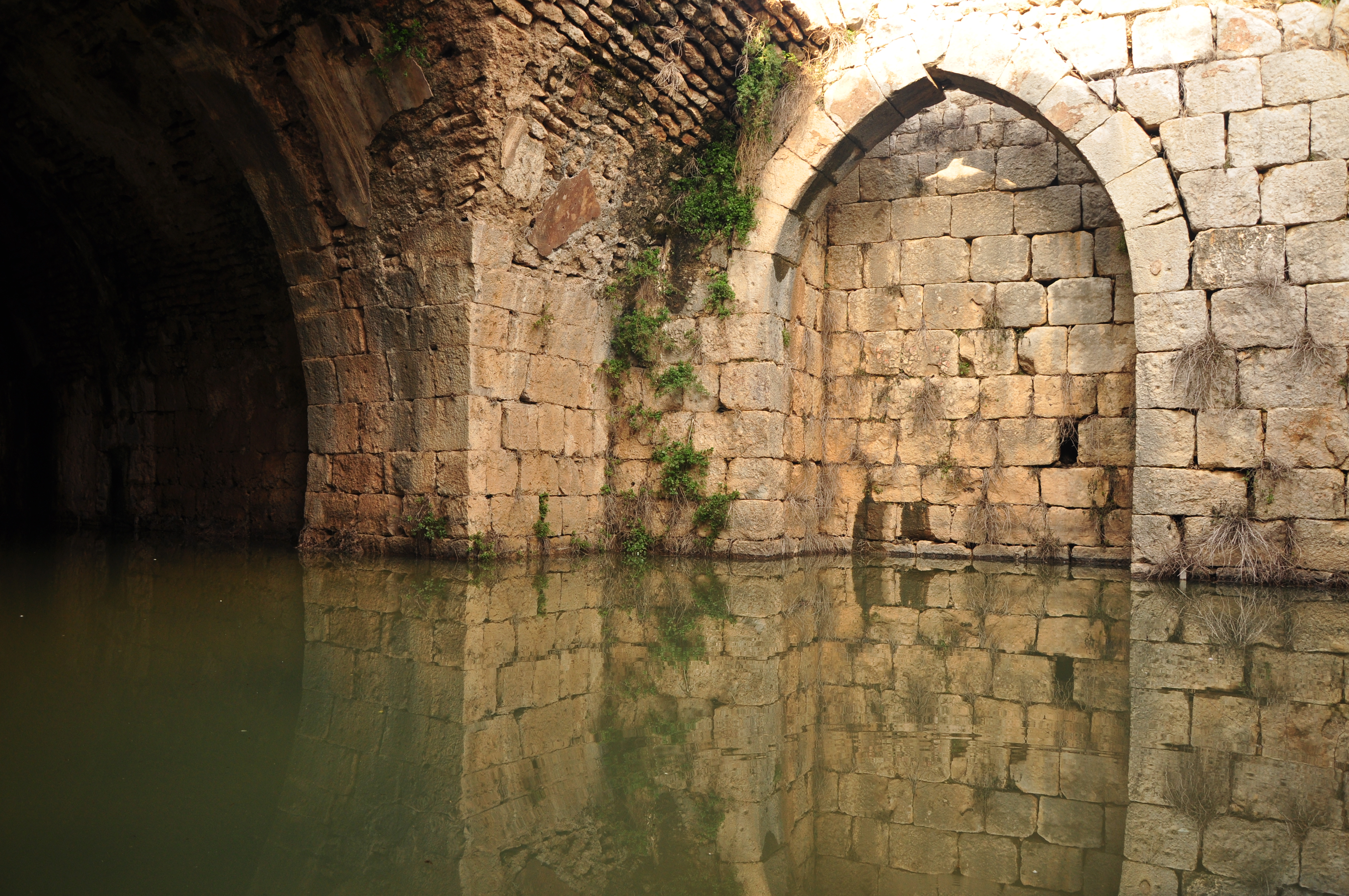
Nimrod Fortress - cistern

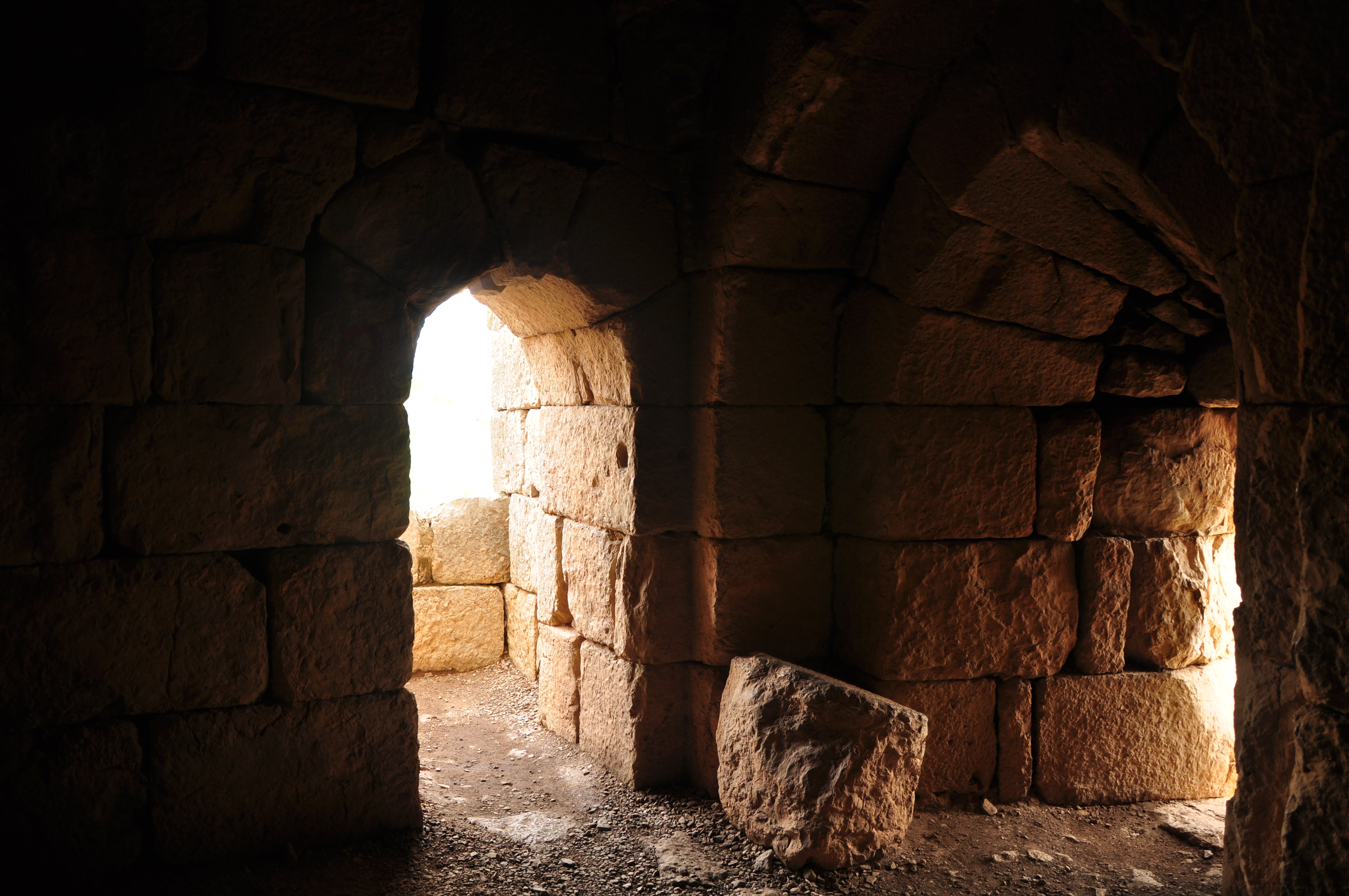
Nimrod Fortress - room with door, loophole

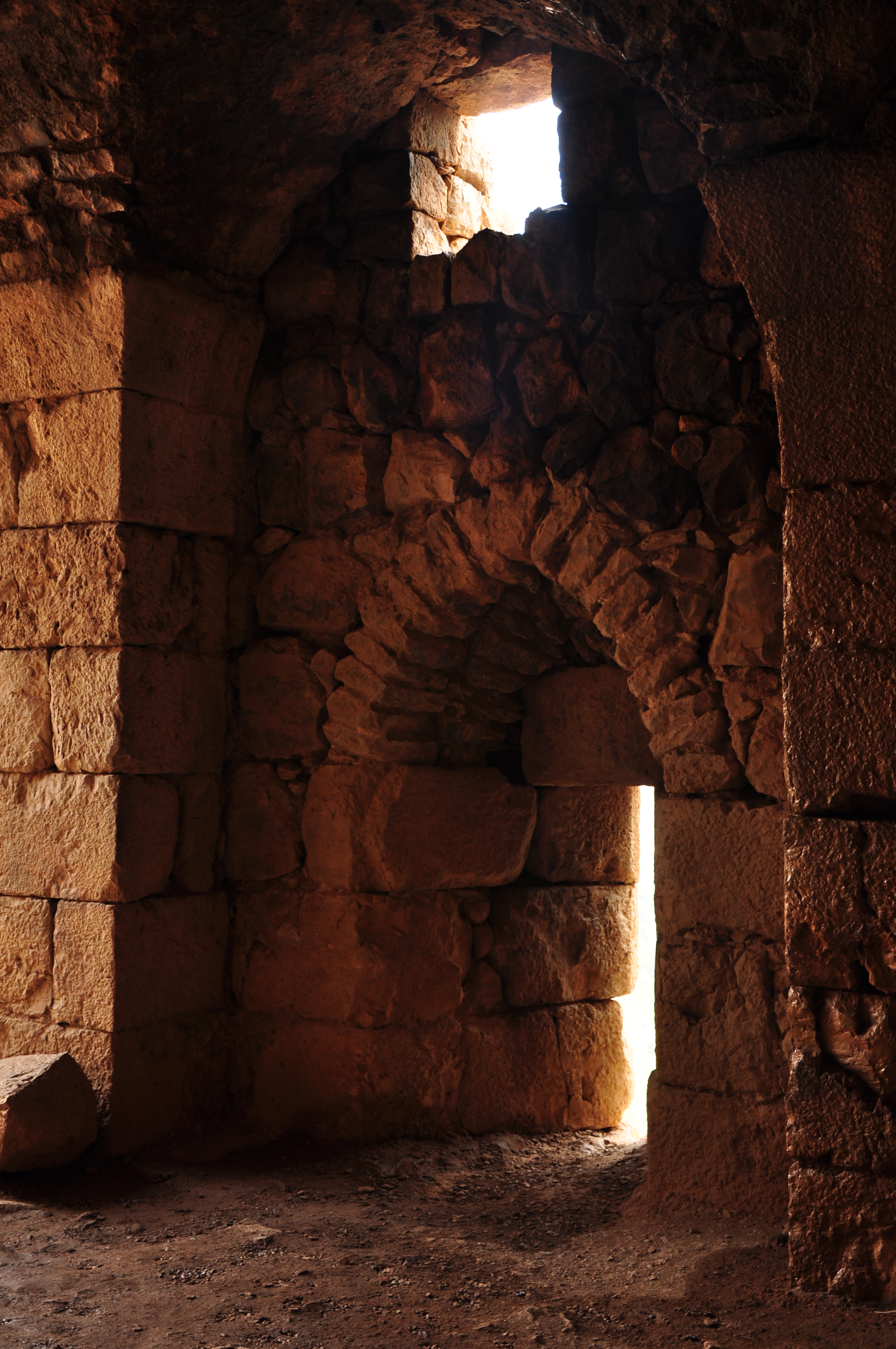
Nimrod Fortress - room with loophole

== See also ==
- List of castles in Syria
