= Mechinat Avnei Eitan =

Educational institution in Avnei Eitan, Golan Heights, Israel

Coordinates: 32.827258°N 35.762622°E

Mechinat Avnei Eitan (Hebrew: מכינת אבנ"י אית"ן), also referred to as Leadership Yeshiva Academy in English, is a pre-military mechina which combines classical Yeshiva learning with the preparation for the service in the Israel Defense Forces and leadership functions in Jewish communities. The mechina, the first of its kind for English speakers, was founded in 2004, in Avnei Eitan, an Israeli settlement organized as a moshav in the Golan Heights.

== Campus ==
The campus, on the moshav, consists of sapartments, Beit Medrash and classrooms, a large Hebrew and English library, a student lounge, sports and workout facilities including a basketball court, a computer room with Internet access, a kitchen, and more.

== Students ==
The students come from the U.S., Canada, Israel, Switzerland, Ethiopia, and other countries as well. They attend special programs including army training exercises, group dynamics, survival courses, treks, martial arts, etc. Students also undertake several courses intended to give them "an in depth understanding of contemporary Jewish and Israeli national issues. This will help them better understand and represent Israel to their peers and on college campuses."

A high percentage of the students who have graduated from the mechina tend to serve in Sayerot, or elite units, in the Israeli army.

While attending the mechina, students are urged to take upon themselves projects that they can work on throughout the year. Examples include raising awareness for the imprisoned Israeli spy, Jonathan Pollard and the organization Et'chem Kol Ha'derech which coordinates visits to injured soldiers. During the Second Lebanon War, a crew that would rush to katyusha explosions to help clean up the devastation was organized.
