= Château Golan =

Israeli winery

- Location: Eliad
- Coordinates: 32.8045°N 35.7341°E
- Wine region: Galilee
- Founded: 1999; 26 years ago
- First vintage: 2000
- Key people: Uri Hetz, winemaker
- Distribution: National
- Website: www.chateaugolan.com

Château Golan (Hebrew: יקב שאטו גולן) is an Israeli winery established in 1999. It is located in the southern Golan Heights, near the point where the Yarmuk River and wadi Ruqqad meet.

The winemaker is Uri Hetz. The winery features a French-style Château, built from basalt, which is also used for art exhibitions.

The winery grows thirteen grape types, including Bordelaise varieties Cabernet Sauvignon, Merlot, Cabernet Franc and Petit Verdot; Mediterranean varieties of French and Spanish origin: Syrah, Grenache, Mourvèdre, Carignan, Petite Syrah, Roussanne, Grenache blanc and Viognier; and the Portuguese variety Touriga Nacional. Production is about 75,000 bottles annually
