= Ein Qiniyye =

Druze village in the northern Golan Heights

Ein Qiniya عين قنية עין קנייא
- Village
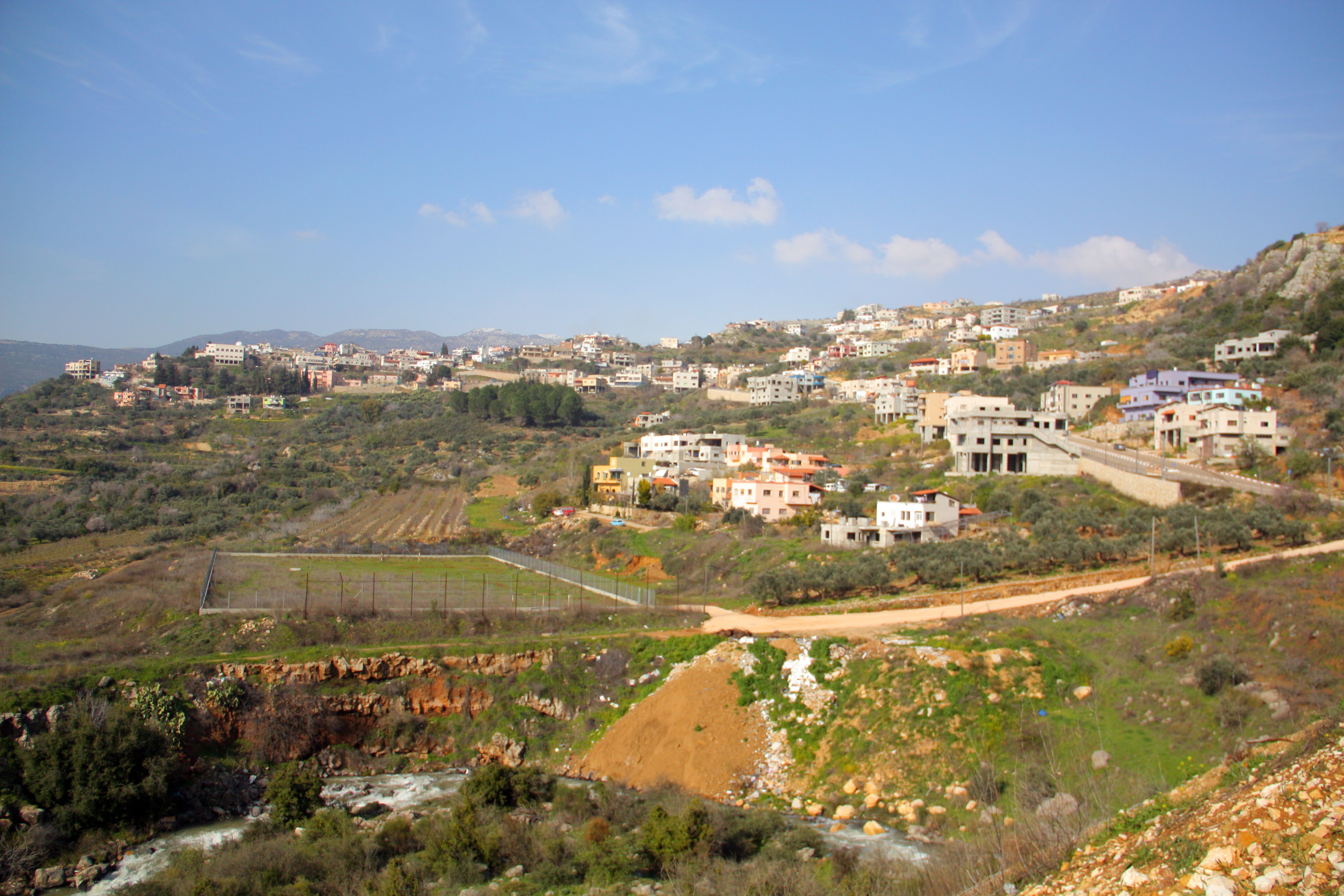
- Ein Qiniyye

- Golan Heights on the map of Syria. Ein Qiniyye on the map of the Golan Heights. Ein Qiniya (Syria)
- Coordinates: 33°14′13″N 35°43′51″E
- Country: Golan Heights, internationally recognized as Syrian territory occupied by Israel. See Status of the Golan Heights.
- Israeli District: Northern District
- Israeli Subdistrict: Golan Subdistrict
- Natural Region: Hermon
- Syrian Governorate: Quneitra Governorate
- Syrian District: Quneitra District
- Syrian Subdistrict: Mas'ade Subdistrict

Population (2024)
  - Total: 2,470

Ein Qiniyye or 'Ayn Qunya (Arabic: عين قنية; Hebrew: עֵין קֻנִיֶּה) is a Druze town located in the Golan Heights, in the southern foothills of Mount Hermon. The village lies at an elevation of approximately 750 metres above sea level. It has been under Israeli occupation since 1967 and is administered by Israel as a local council since 1982.

Its inhabitants are mostly Syrian citizens with permanent residency status in Israel (for more about the status and position of the Golan Heights Druze community see here). In 2024 it had a population of 2,470.

== History ==
The presence of Druze around Mount Hermon is documented since the founding of the Druze religion in the beginning of the 11th century.

In 1838, Eli Smith noted Ein Qiniyye's population as Druze, Antiochian Greek Christians and Maronites.

Ein Qiniyye is one of the four remaining Druze-Syrian communities on the Israeli-occupied side of Mount Hermon and the Golan Heights, together with Majdal Shams, Mas'ade and Buq'ata. Geographically a distinction is made between the Golan Heights and Mount Hermon, the boundary being marked by the Sa'ar Stream; however, administratively usually they are lumped together. Ein Qiniyye and Majdal Shams are on the Hermon side of the boundary, thus sitting on limestone, while Buq'ata and Mas'ade are on the Golan side, characterised by black volcanic rock (basalt).

Since the adoption of the 1981 Golan Heights Law, Ein Qiniyye is under Israeli civil law, and incorporated into the Israeli system of local councils. Some of the young people of the village used to study at Syrian universities, but at the end of 2012 a Druze cleric advised them against applying until the Syrian civil war was over. Most of the town's residents are Druze, but a few Christians remain of a much larger community that left the town in the 1940s and 1950s.

== Demography ==
Historical population
Year	Pop.	±%
1983	1,100	—
1995	1,400	+27.3%
2008	1,700	+21.4%
2022	2,361	+38.9%
2024	2,470	+4.6%

== Transportation ==
The Golan Regional Council operates eight buses per day from Ein Qiniyye to the Israeli city of Kiryat Shmona. The bus line also stops at Ghajar along the way. The bus ride to Kiryat Shmona takes approximately 31 minutes. Ein Qiniyye is located two kilometers from Highway 99, an east-west road running through the northern Golan Heights.

== Voting Patterns ==
In the 2026 election, 59 percent of voters in Ein Qiniyye voted for the parties of the center-left coalition led by Gadi Eisenkot, while 9 percent voted for the parties of the right-wing coalition led by Benjamin Netanyahu and 2 percent voted for the Arab parties. An additional 1.3 percent voted for the Reservists, while 0.8 percent voted for Amcha Yisrael and 28 percent voted for the minor party Israel First. Voter turnout was more than ten times higher than in the 2022 election, the largest increase of any town in Israel (the only other comparable towns are the three other Druze towns in the Golan), which is mostly attributable to the surge in Israeli citizenship among the Golan Druze as a result of the fall of the Assad regime and the 2025 massacres of Druze in southern Syria.

== Religious buildings ==
Ein Qiniyye has a church:

- St. George of the Maronite Church

== Sister city ==
- (United States) Great Neck, New York, USA (2022)

== See also ==
- Druze in Syria
- Christianity in Syria
