= Ramat Magshimim =

Israeli settlement in the Golan Heights

Ramat Magshimim: רָמַת מַגְשִׁימִים (Hebrew)
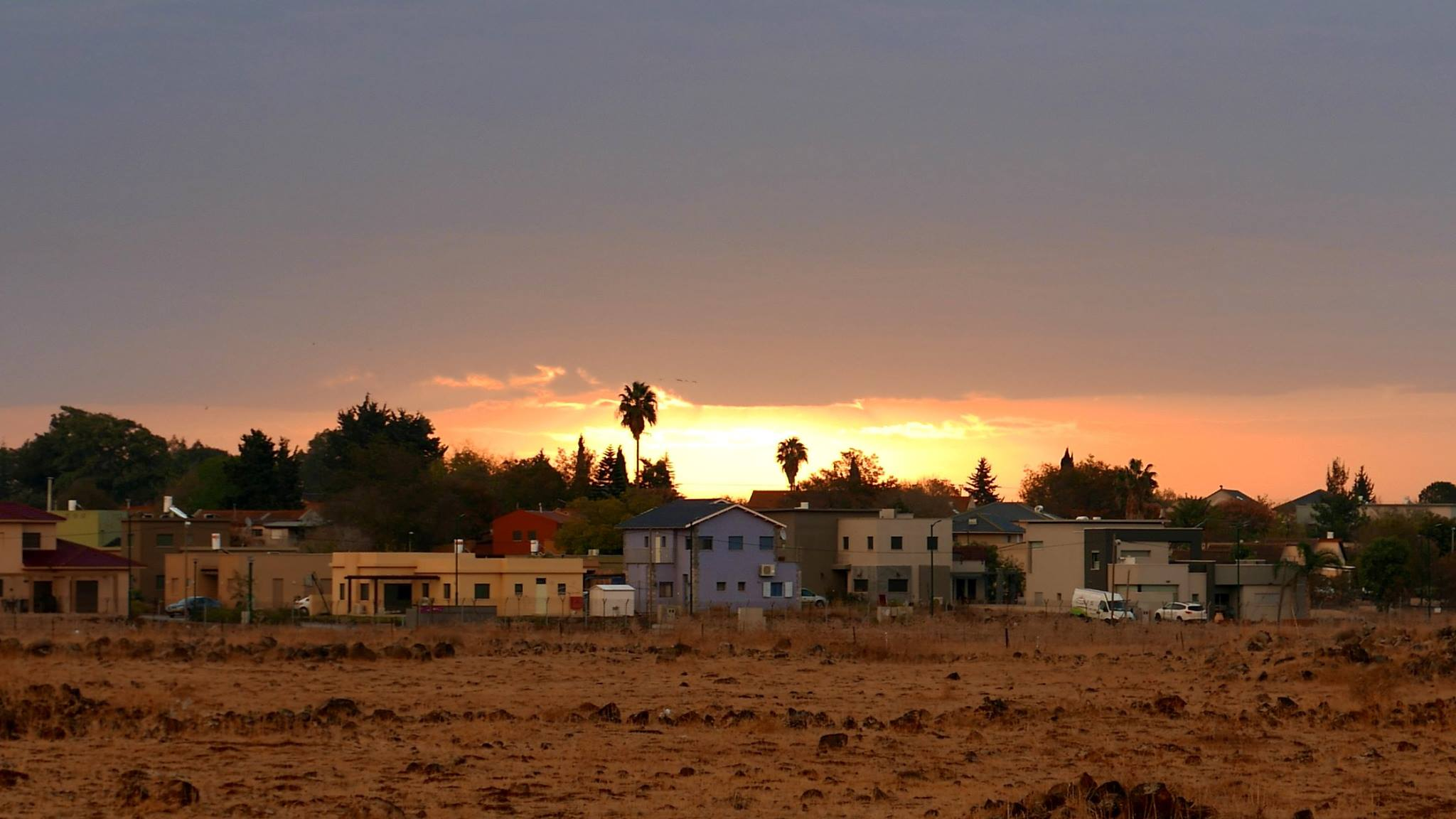
- Etymology: Height of the Pioneers
- Location within the Golan Heights Location within the Golan Heights
- Coordinates: 32°50′46″N 35°48′31″E
- Country: Golan Heights (Internationally recognized as Syrian territory occupied by Israel.)
- District: Northern
- Subdistrict: Golan
- Council: Golan
- Region: Golan Heights
- Affiliation: Hapoel HaMizrachi
- Founded: 1968
- Population (2024): 815

Ramat Magshimim (Hebrew: רָמַת מַגְשִׁימִים, lit "Height of the Pioneers") is an Israeli settlement and moshav in the southern Golan Heights. In 2024 it had a population of 815.

The international community considers Israeli settlements in the Golan Heights illegal under international law, but the Israeli government disputes this.

== History ==
The settlement was one of the first in the Golan Heights, and the first religious settlement. The community was established in 1968, initially living in abandoned houses in Fiq. After eight months they moved to an abandoned Syrian army camp adjacent to the current location, before moving again in the summer of 1972. At the time, the Golan Heights were part of the Israeli Military Governorate; in 1981, the area of Golan was unilaterally annexed by Israel, abolishing the military occupation system and establishing Israeli civil rule on the area.

== See also ==
- Hesder
