= Golan Subdistrict =

Disputed subdistrict in northern Israel

Coordinates: 33°0′0.0″N 35°45′0.0″E

Golan Subdistrict נפת גולן قضاء الجولان
- Subdistrict
- Northern District in blue, with Golan Subdistrict in dark blue
- Interactive map of Golan Subdistrict
- Country: Israel
- District: Northern District

Area
  - Total: 1,154 km^{2} (446 sq mi)

Population (2024)
  - Total: 57,611

Ethnicity
  - Jews and others: 50.1%
  - Arabs (mostly Druze): 48.1%

The Golan Subdistrict is an area administered by Israel as a subdistrict of the Northern District. The subdistrict encompasses the Golan Heights, occupied by Israel from Syria since the 1967 Six-Day War and annexed under the Golan Heights Law. The region is internationally recognized to encompass Syria's Quneitra Governorate, which itself is composed of two districts and five subdistricts.

== Towns and administration ==
The largest city in the subdistrict is the Druze town of Majdal Shams, with a population of circa 11.5 thousand. The largest Israeli settlement in the subdistrict is the town of Katzrin, with a population of c. 8 thousand.

Most localities in the subdistrict are organized as part of the Golan Regional Council, with the exception of six towns which are run as separate local councils. These are Katzrin, the four Druze towns (Buq'ata, Ein Qiniyye, Majdal Shams and Mas'ade), and the southern part of the Alawite town of Ghajar.

== History ==
Historically Syrian territory, Israel occupied the area in 1967 as a result of the 1967 Six-Day War.

On December 14, 1981, the Israeli Knesset passed the Golan Heights Law, applying Israeli laws to the territory and creating the Golan Subdistrict as an administrative body.

On March 25, 2019, the United States officially recognized the Golan Heights as being under the sovereignty of Israel. Israeli officials lobbied the United States into recognizing Israeli sovereignty over the territory.

In 2026, Colombia also officially recognized the Golan Heights as being under the sovereignty of Israel.

== Demography ==
With a 2024 population of 57,611 people, the Golan Subdistrict is the least populous officially designated subdistrict in Israel. The population consists mainly of Israeli Jews, Druze (see Status of Druze in the Israeli-occupied Golan Heights and Druze in Syria), and the Alawites of Ghajar. A slight majority of the population is Jewish.

Historical population
Year	Pop.	±%
1983	17,900	—
1995	27,800	+55.3%
2008	40,400	+45.3%
2022	54,862	+35.8%
2024	57,611	+5.0%

== Administrative local authorities ==
Cities	Local Councils	Regional Councils
[None]	Buq'ata; Ein Qiniyye; Ghajar; Katzrin; Majdal Shams; Mas'ada	Golan

== Voting Patterns ==
In the 2022 election, 53 percent of voters in the subdistrict voted for the parties of the center-left coalition led by Yair Lapid, while 46 percent voted for the parties of the right-wing coalition led by Benjamin Netanyahu, and just 1 percent voted for the Arab parties (most of whose votes came from Ghajar).

In the 2026 election, 53 percent of voters in the subdistrict voted for the parties of the center-left coalition led by Gadi Eisenkot, while 36 percent voted for the parties of the right-wing coalition led by Benjamin Netanyahu and 2 percent voted for the Arab parties. An additional 3.5 percent voted for the Reservists, and another 3.5 percent voted for Amcha Yisrael. Voter turnout increased 48 percent from the 2022 election.

== Natural Regions ==
Districts, Subdistricts and Natural Regions of the State of Israel, 2018

- 291 Hermon
  - Population (2024): 13,960
  - Largest city: Majdal Shams
- 292 Northern Golan
  - Population (2024): 19,056
  - Largest city: Buq'ata
- 293 Middle Golan
  - Population (2024): 13,150
  - Largest city: Katzrin
- 294 Southern Golan
  - Population (2024): 11,445
  - Largest city: Haspin
