= Nabataean architecture =

Ancient Near East construction style

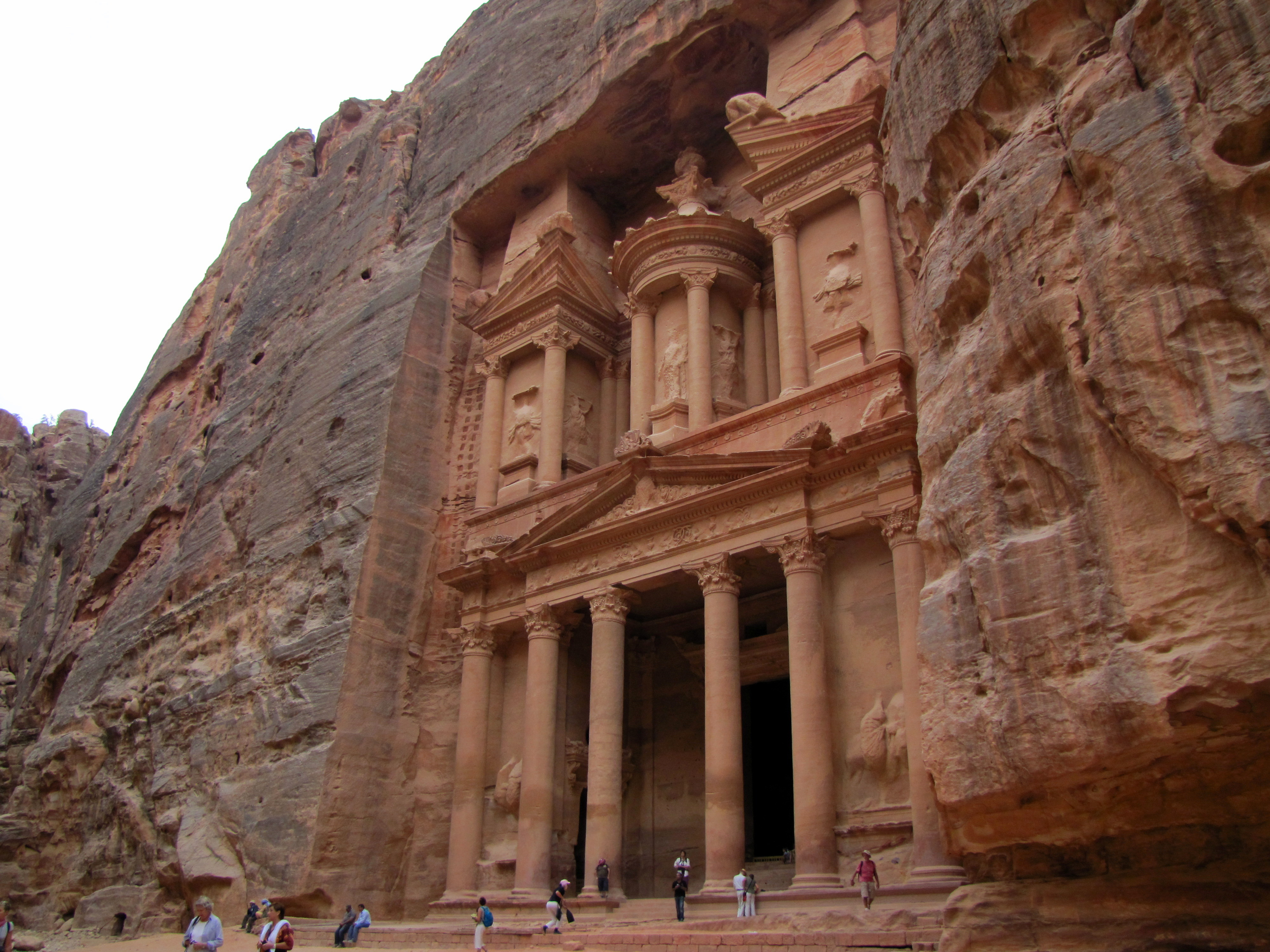
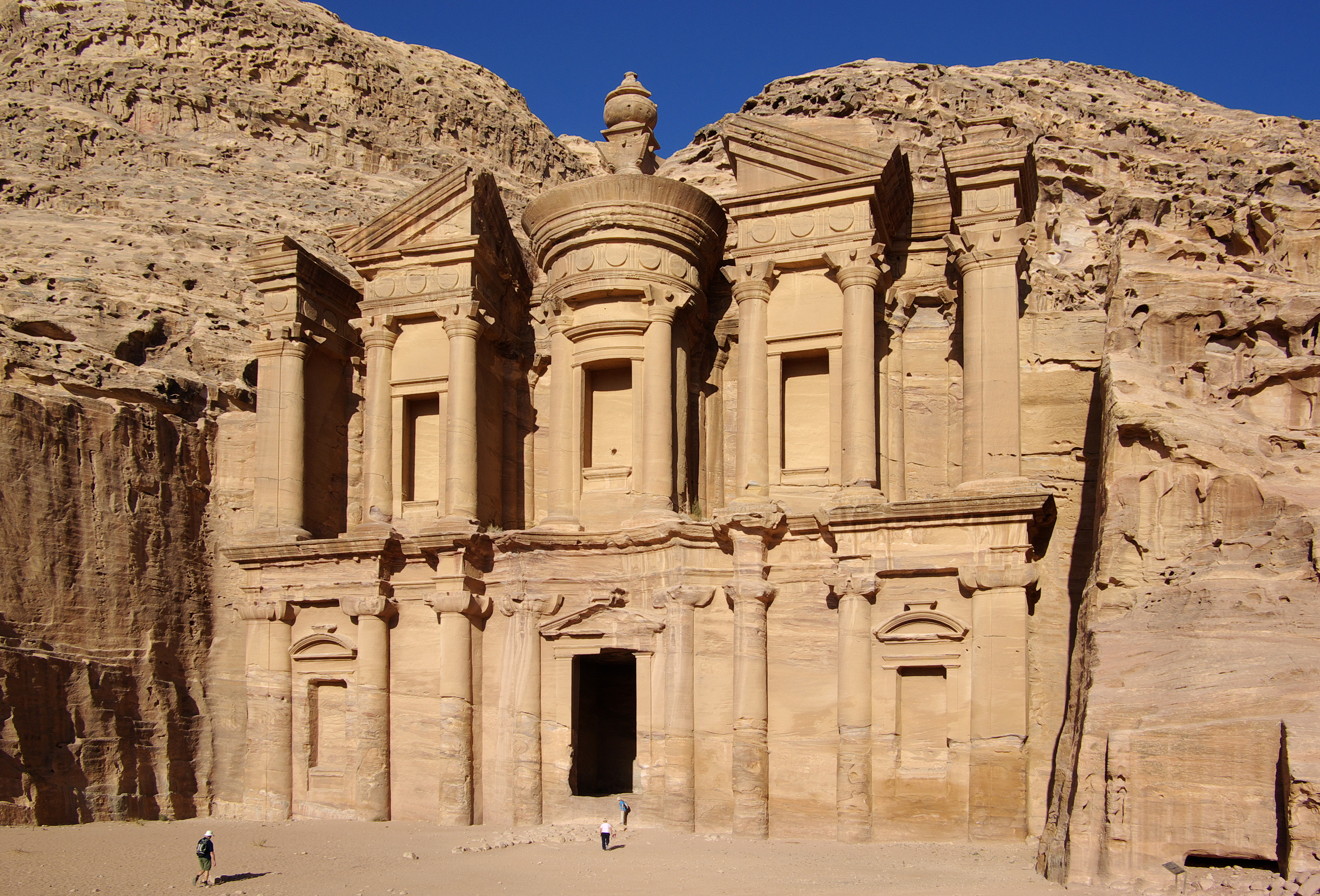
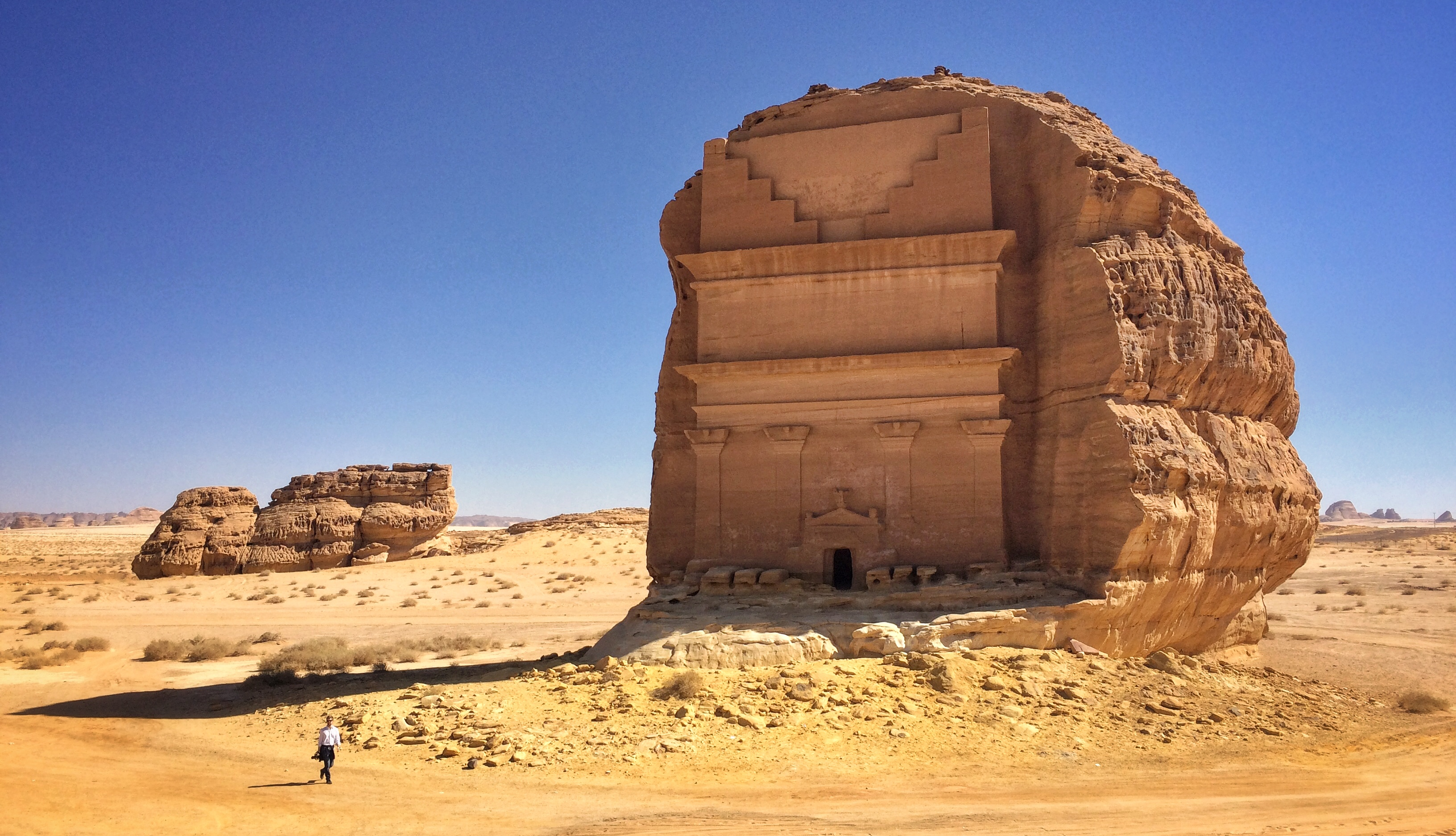
- Top: Al-Khazneh; Middle: Ed-Deir; Bottom: Qasr Al-Farid in Hegra (Mada’in Salih)
- Years active: 4th century BC – 2nd century AD

Nabataean architecture or Nabatean architecture refers to the building traditions of the Nabateans, an ancient Arab people who inhabited northern Arabia and the southern Levant. Their settlements—most prominently the assumed capital city of Raqmu (present-day Petra, Jordan), Nabataean architecture is found across ancient settlements in northwestern Arabia, as well as throughout the Southern Levant including the Hauran region and the Negev Desert, reflecting the broad geographic reach of Nabataean civilization.

Their architectural style is notable for its temples and tombs, most famously the ones found in Petra. The style appears to be a mix of Mesopotamian, Hellenistic, and South Arabian influences modified to suit the Arab architectural taste. Petra, the capital of the Nabataean Kingdom, is as famous now as it was in the antiquity for its remarkable rock-cut tombs and temples. Most architectural Nabatean remains, dating from the 1st century BC to the 2nd century AD, are highly visible and well-preserved, with over 500 monuments in Petra, in modern-day Jordan, and 110 well preserved tombs set in the desert landscape of Hegra, now in modern-day Saudi Arabia. Much of the surviving architecture was carved out of rock cliffs, hence the columns do not actually support anything but are used for purely ornamental purposes. In addition to the most famous sites in Petra, there are also Nabatean complexes at Obodas (Avdat) and residential complexes at Mampsis (Kurnub) and a religious site of et-Tannur.

The accomplishments the Nabateans had with hydraulic technology forged the power and the increase of the standard of living of the residents living in the capital of the ancient Nabataean Kingdom. Cited among the most powerful of Pre-Islamic Arabia, Petra does not hold its fame and its prosperity only by its buildings dug and sculpted in the rocks of the surrounding mountains; it is above all through its extraordinary hydraulic system, built over the centuries, that Petra was able to develop in the middle of an inhospitable desert and become a strategic crossroad for which stood halfway between the opening to the Gulf of Aqaba and the Dead Sea at a point where the Incense Route from Arabia to Damascus was crossed by the overland route from Petra to Gaza City. This position gave the Nabateans a hold over the trade along the Incense Route.

Although the Nabataean kingdom became a client state of the Roman Empire in the first century BC, it was only in 106 AD that it lost its independence. Petra fell to the Romans, who annexed Nabataea and renamed it as Arabia Petraea. Petra's importance declined as sea trade routes emerged. The earthquake of the year 363 caused an end to the development of the city and to the maintenance of the hydraulic network that survived the epoch of the Roman rule, mainly the storage tanks and the aqueducts, part of which was destroyed and no longer allowed transport water to the various buildings and the partially destroyed thermal baths. In the Byzantine era several Christian churches were built, but the city continued to decline, and by the early Islamic era it was abandoned except for a handful of nomads. It remained unknown until it was rediscovered in 1812 by Johann Ludwig Burckhardt.

== Types ==
=== Religious architecture ===
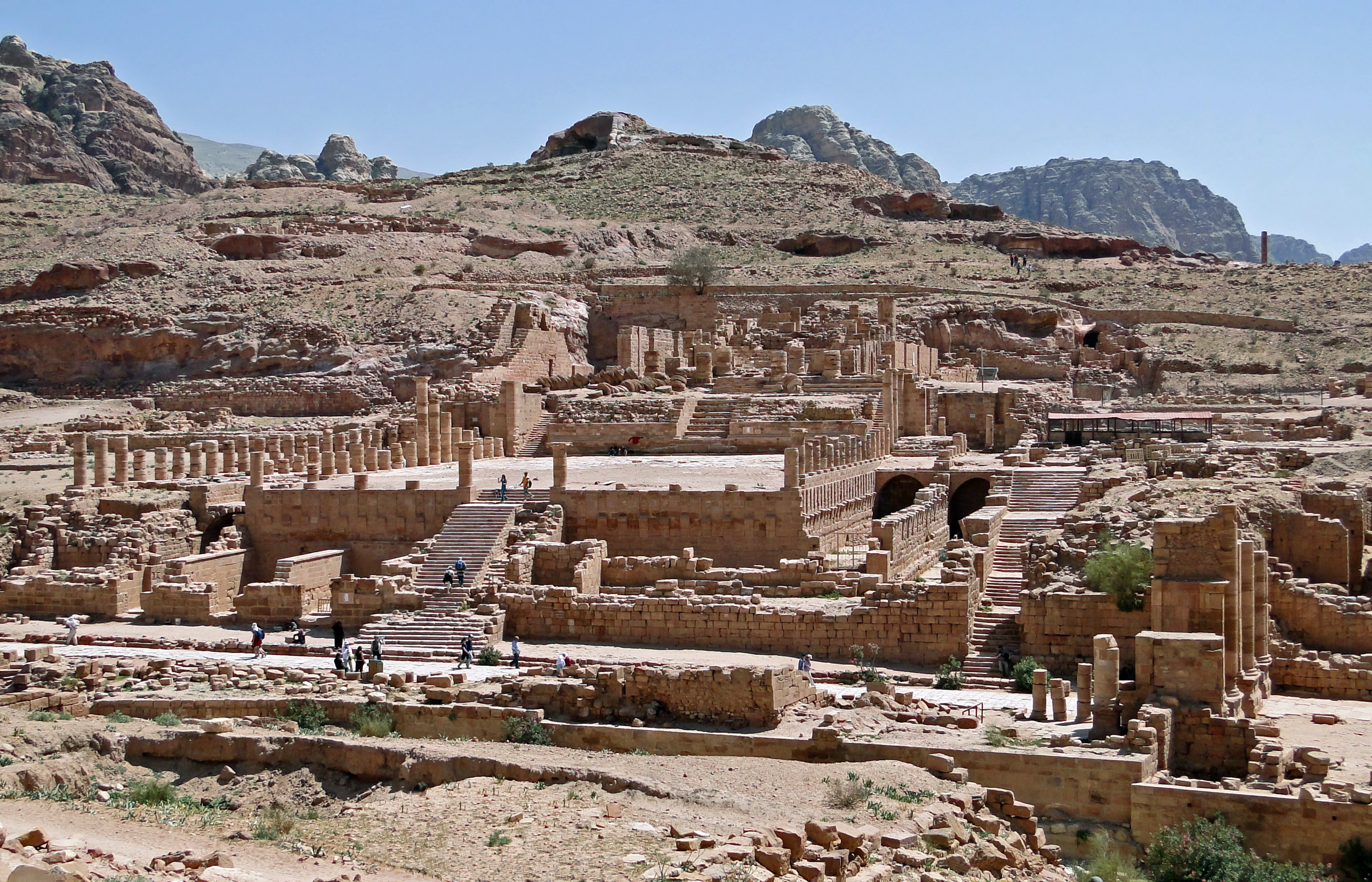
The Great Temple in Petra, Jordan

The religious architecture was mostly represented by the Nabatean temples, represented by several architectural models built to suit the Nabatean rituals of worship, most notably the Great Temple and the Temple of the Winged Lions.

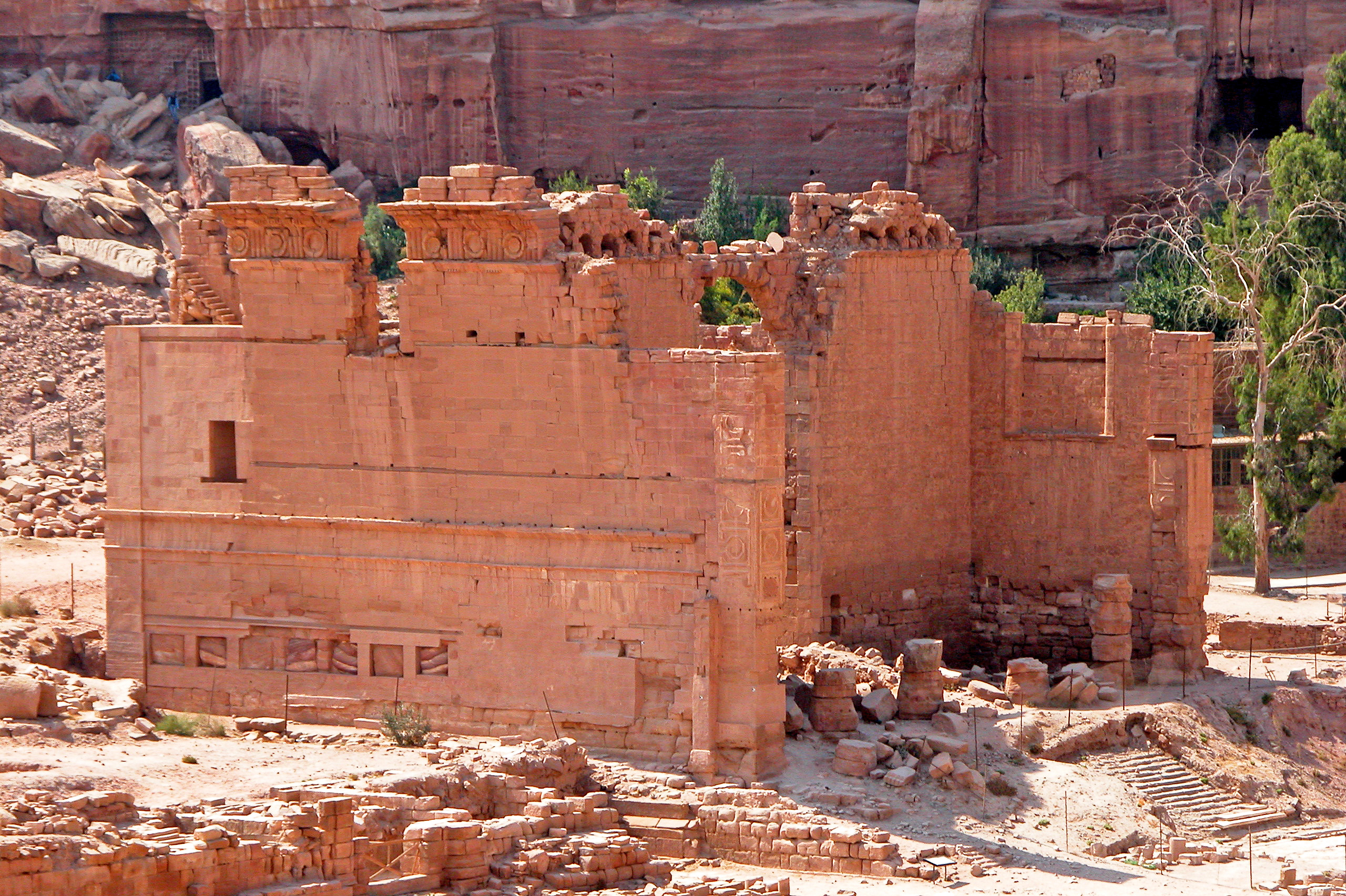
Qasr al-Bint temple

The Nabataeans had numerous places for religious practice and cult worship. Known as “High places”, the shrines, temples, and altars would usually be open air structures placed atop nearby mountains. These places throughout the Nabataean kingdom would be dedicated to the worship of the same god(s), how they would go about this worship would vary from site to site. Offering would vary from material goods and foods, to live sacrifice of animals, maybe humans. The Nabataean kingdom can broke up into five religious regions each containing locations of religious significance: The Southern Jordan, Northwestern Saudi Arabia (Hejaz), The Negev, The Hauran, and finally Central Jordan. All of the religious sites at these locations are in varying states of preservation, making it difficult to know which deities would have been worshiped at specific shrines, altars, and temples. It is also difficult to know the specifics of the cult practices, meaning educated speculations can be made.

=== Southern Jordan ===
Petra

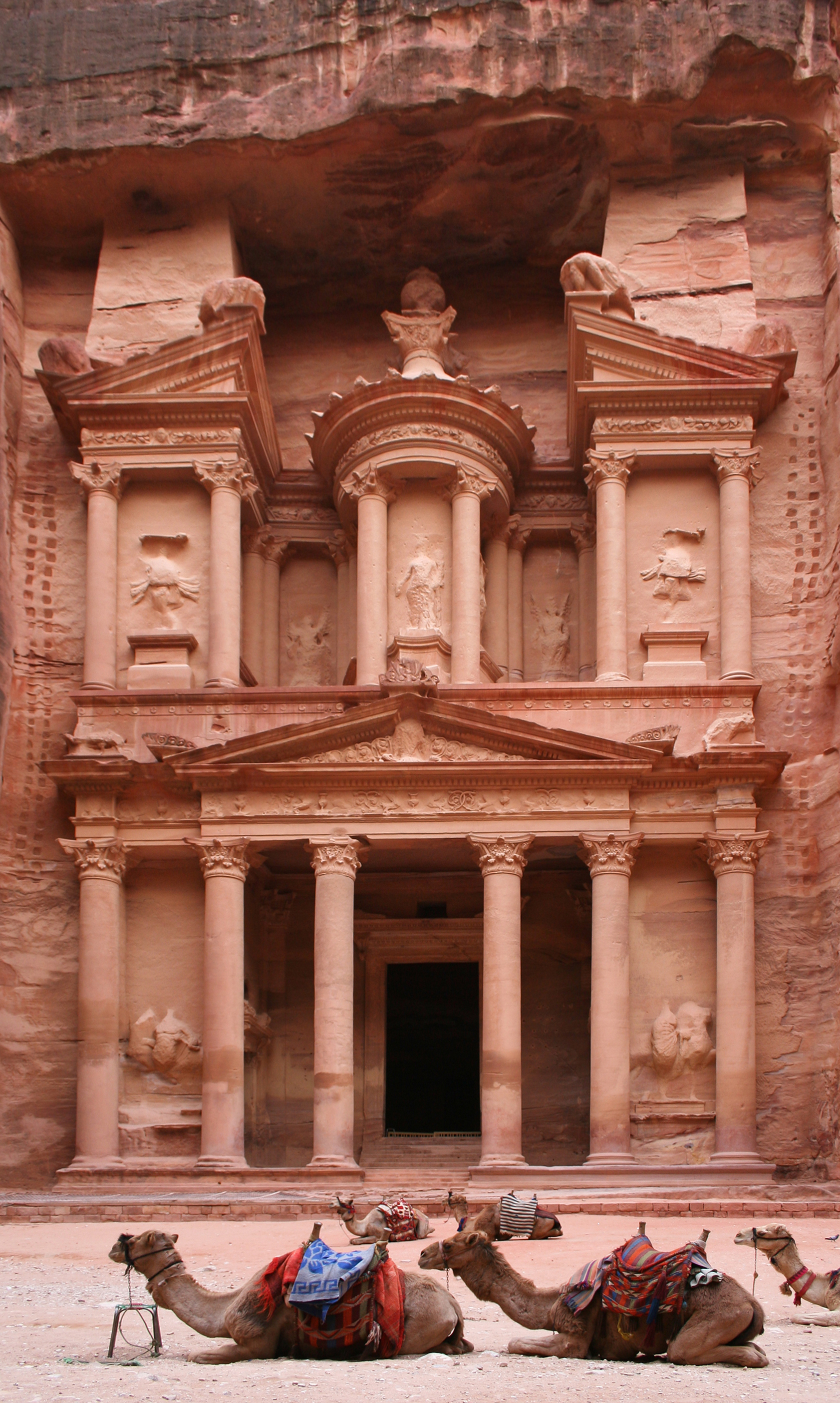
Al-Khazneh (The Treasury) in Petra is the most famous Nabataean monument

Capital of the Nabataean Kingdom in around 312 BC. The city is famous for its marvelous rock-cut architecture. Located within the Shara Mountains, Dushara was the primary male god accompanied by the female trinity: Al-'Uzzá, Allat, and Manāt. A Stele dedicated to the Edomite god Qos is located within the city. Nabataeans worshiped pre-Islamic Arab gods and goddesses, along with deified kings, such as Obodas I. Temple layout and design shows influence from Rome, Greek, Egyptian, and Persian temple architecture. The temples of Qasr al-Bint and temple of the Winged Lion are examples of this. The podium within the Temple of the Winged Lion housed the altar, where sacrifices would have been made, or the betyl of the worshiped deity. Based on the idols and imagery found within the Temple of the Winged Lion, it is theorized to be dedicated to Dushara. The High Place is located atop the mountains that surround Petra. Used as a place for offering gifts and sacrificing animals, maybe humans, to the gods, The High place consists of a pool for collecting water, two altars, and a large open courtyard.

Hawara

A temple with a 20m long processional way which leads to a courtyard with a view of Jebel Qalkha is found in this region. The design of the Betyls as well as the remains of offering points to the possible worship of Dushara, maybe even Jupiter.

Wadi Ramm

Temple to Allat. Rock sanctuary to Ayn esh-Shallaleh located behind temple to Allat. Betyls and cult niches to Dushara and Baalshamin.

=== Northwestern Saudi Arabia ===
Hegra

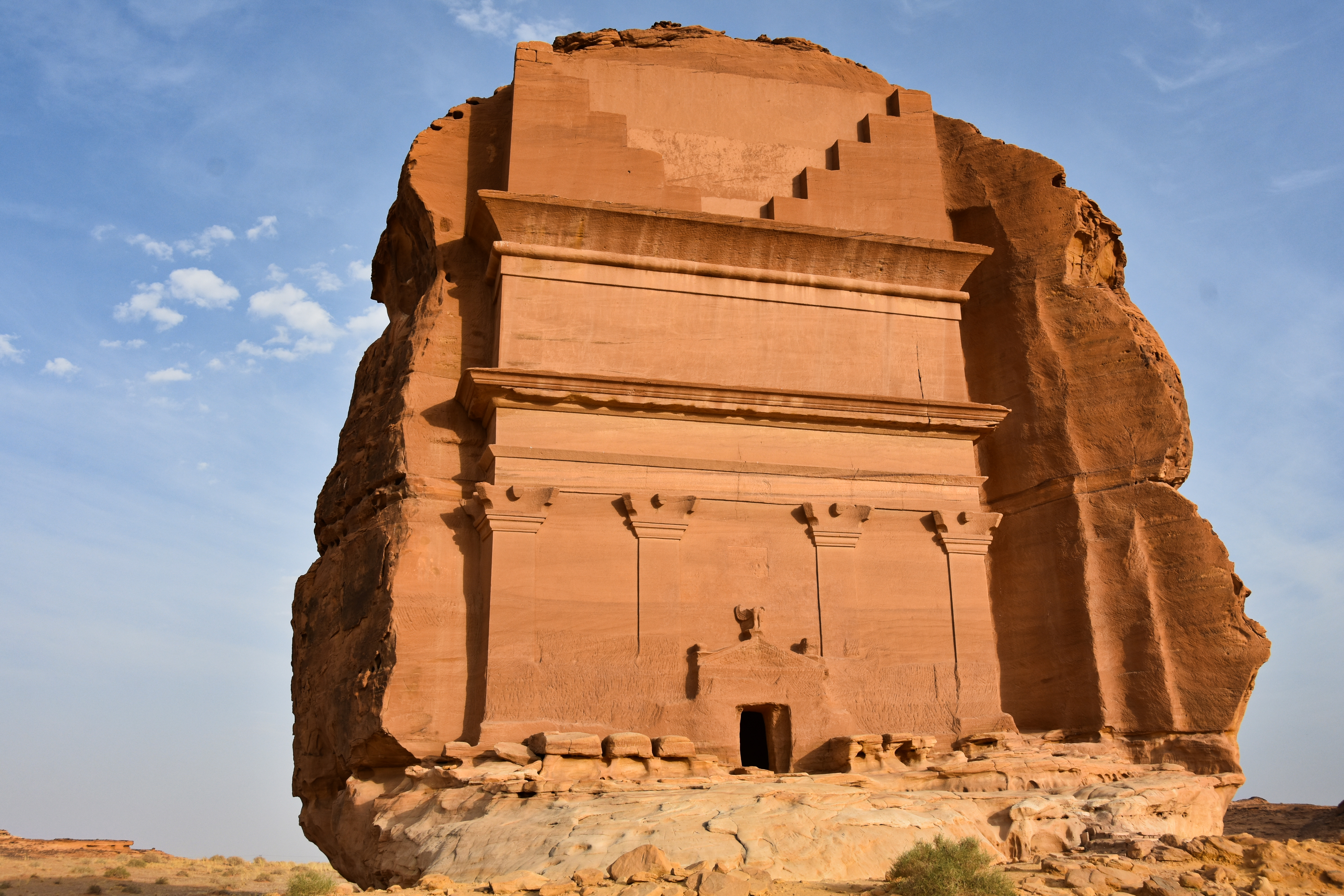
Qasr Al-Farid "lonely Castle", Hegra, Saudi Arabia.

Hegra (Arabic: ٱلْحِجْر, romanized: al-Ḥijr), also known as Mada’in Salih (Arabic: مَدَائِن صَالِح, romanized: Madāʼin Ṣāliḥ, lit. 'Cities of Salih'), is an archaeological site located in the area of al-'Ula within Medina Province in the Hejaz, Saudi Arabia. A majority of the remains date from the Nabataean Kingdom (1st century AD). The site constitutes the kingdom's southernmost settlement and its second largest city after Petra (now in Jordan), its capital city. Traces of Lihyanite and Roman occupation before and after the Nabatean rule, respectively, can also be found. A Cult ritual circle on top of the mountain Jibel Ithlib rests on a rocky outcropping. Small betyls and cult niches to other gods appear around the Jibel Ithlib site. Inscription of “Lord of the Temple,” may refer to Dushara. Marseha cults located here. Today Hegra is known as Mada’in Saleh.

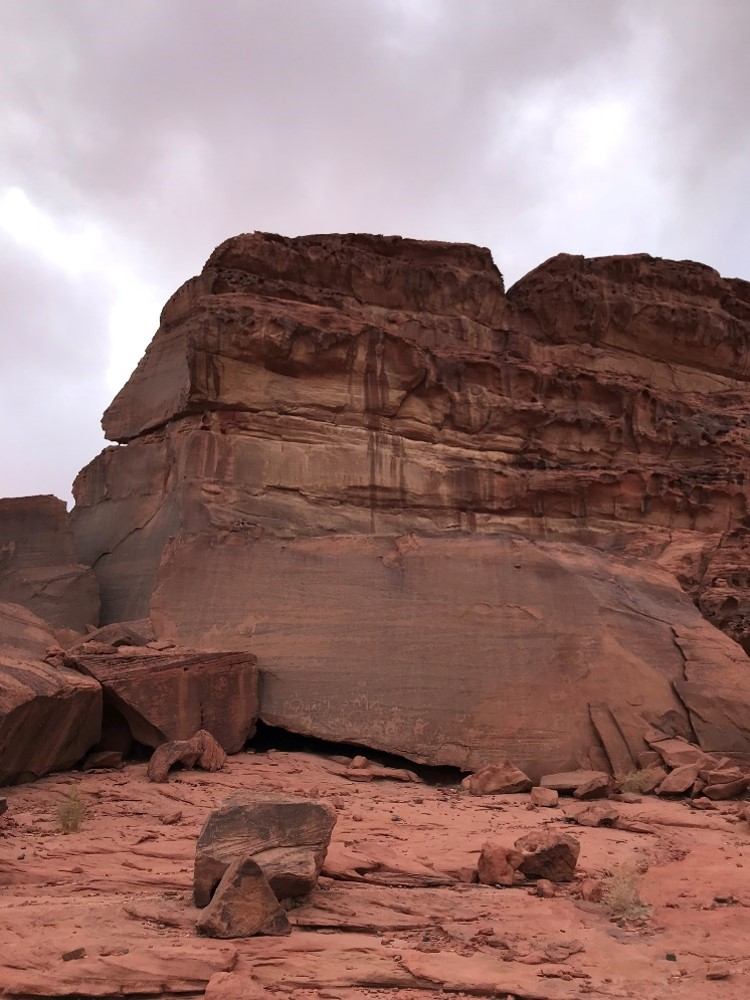
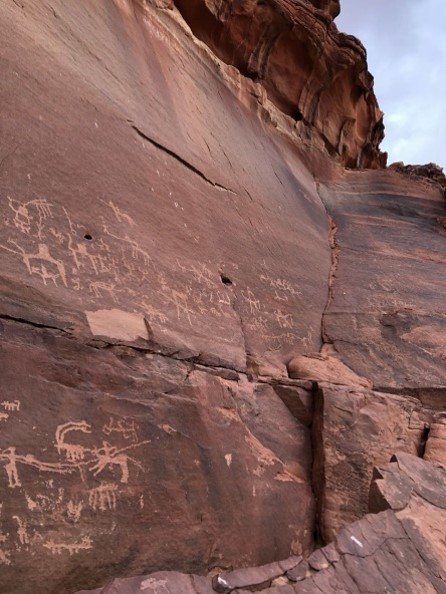
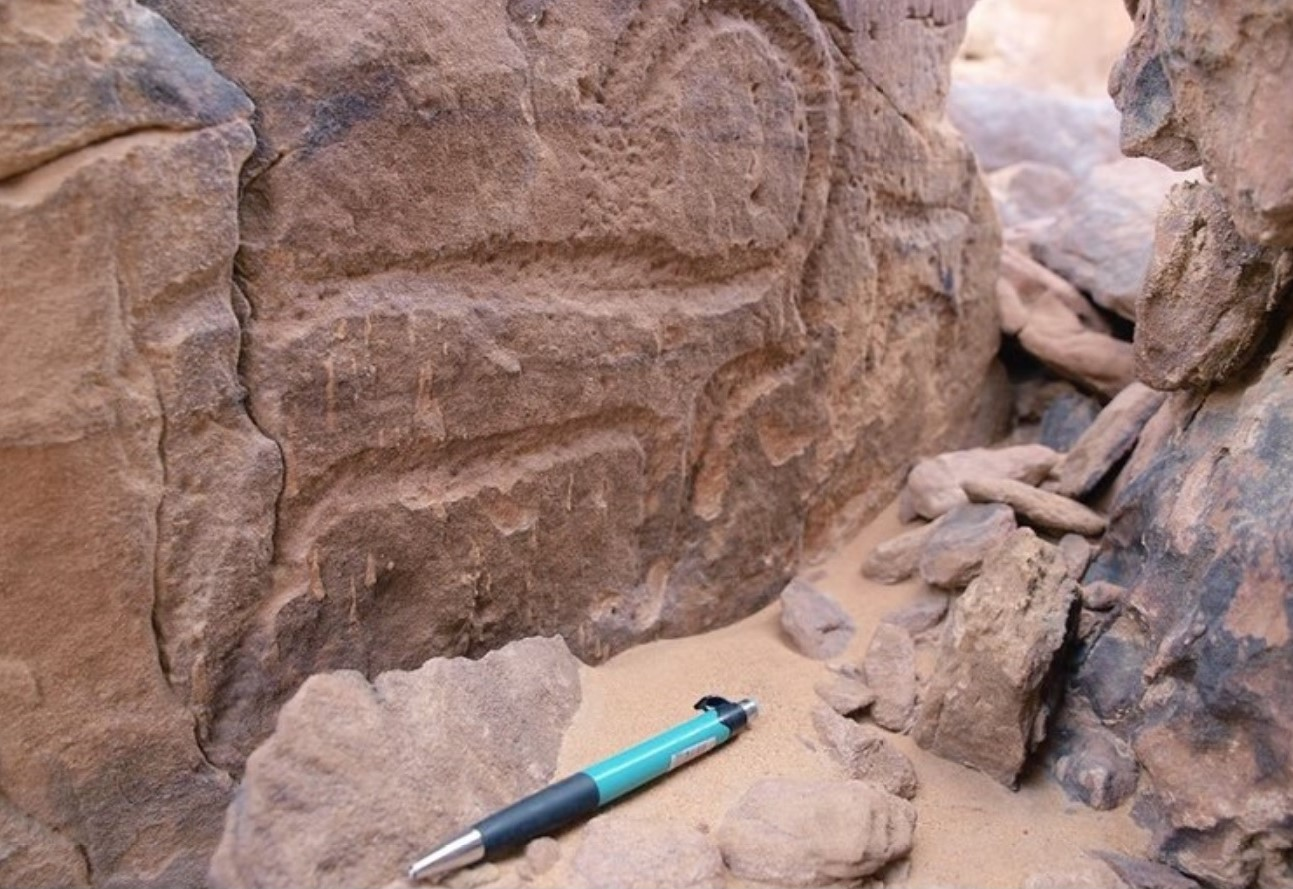
Archeological remains in Al-Rawwafah.

Rawwafah

Located 300 km from Petra in Tabuk province, Saudi Arabia A single temple in the Nabataean style has been discovered. The inscription on the lintel dates the temple to after the fall of the Nabataean kingdom.

=== The Negev ===
Sobata

Located about 40k southwest from Beersheba is the city of Sobata, one of the major cities within the Nabataean kingdom. Very little archeological remains of any form of Nabataean cult worship, temples, shrines, or altars have been found. A small amount of evidence has been found for the worship of Dushara.

Avdat

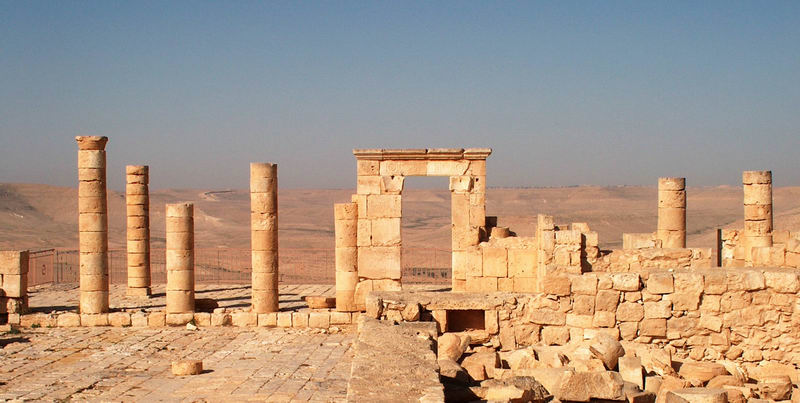
Temple of Oboda

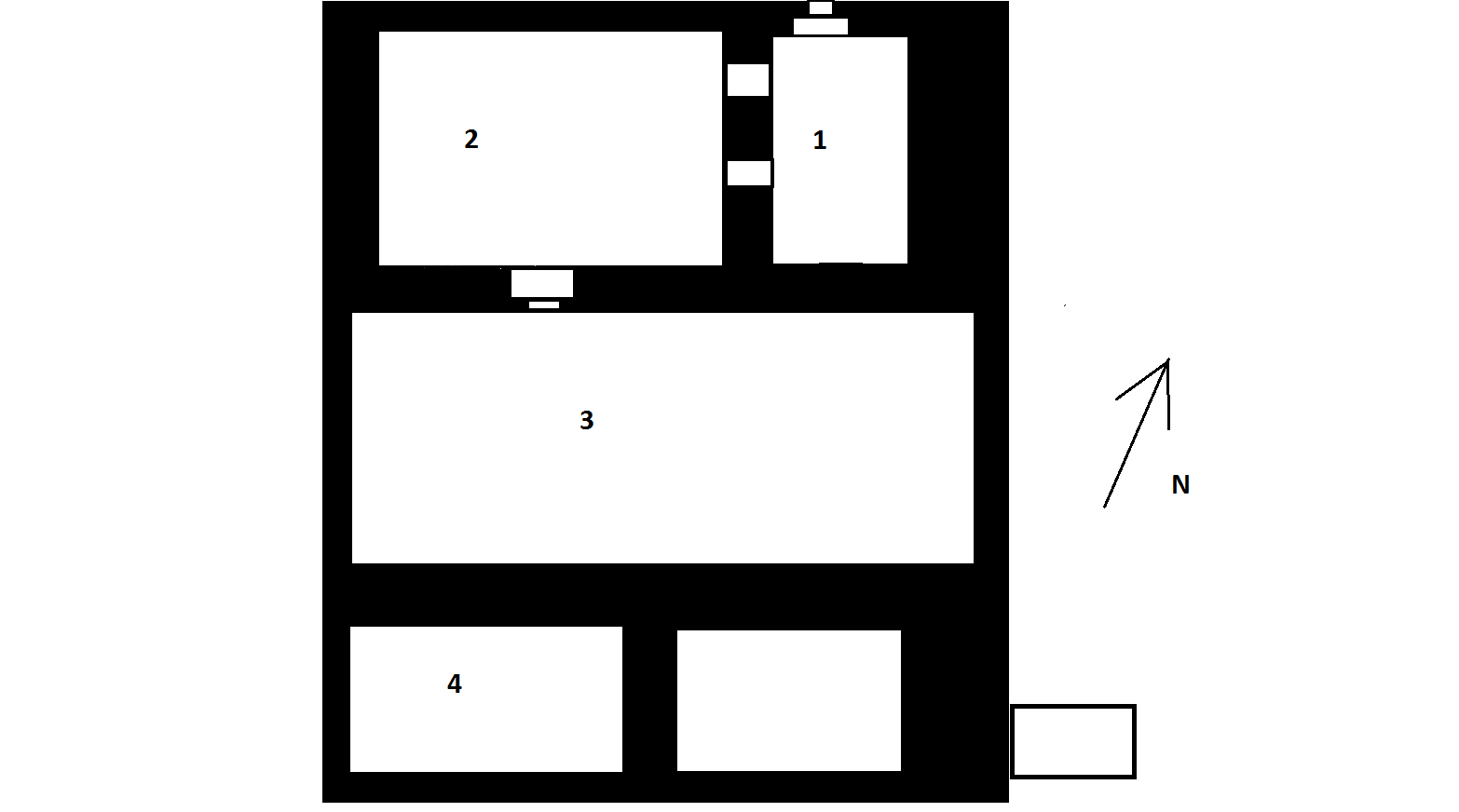
Temple Layout

The building complex known as The Temple of Oboda sits on the acropolis of the city. The temple was built as a dedication to the deified Nabataean king Obodas I. The temple stands adjacent to the east of two other buildings: a Christian chapel and a second temple known as the “western temple.” The temple dedicated to the cult of Obodas the King was built with a hard-limestone in the year 9 BCE during the reign of Obodas II. The temple is a tripartite structure: consisting of a porch, hall and adytum; its overall dimensions are 14 by 11 metres (46 ft × 36 ft). The building was divided into four rooms. The first and second rooms were unequal subdivisions of the adytum (debir), the first room is the eastern room which is the smaller of the two measuring at 3 by 4 metres (9.8 ft × 13.1 ft). The second room was the western room and the larger of the two rooms measuring 5 by 4 metres (16 ft × 13 ft).

The third room was the hall (hekhal), an oblong shape measuring 8 metres (26 ft), which is now completely covered by a Talus. The fourth room is the porch (‘ulam) divided into two compartments one facing west measuring approximately 4 by 4 metres (13 ft × 13 ft) and the other facing east measuring approximately 4 by 4.5 metres (13 ft × 15 ft) were divided by a 60-centimetre (2 ft) wall. A worshiper entered through the porch, which faces south, proceeded through the hall to the rooms of the adytum at the northern end. The worshiper then turned about face toward south to worship the images of the deities placed in niches in the wall. The western room contained two niches which may have contained the images of two Nabataean gods Allat and Dushura. The other room contained a larger single niche where it is believed the deified image of Obodas the King was worshiped. The temple was built to be his eternal resting place and the center of worship for his cult.

Mampsis

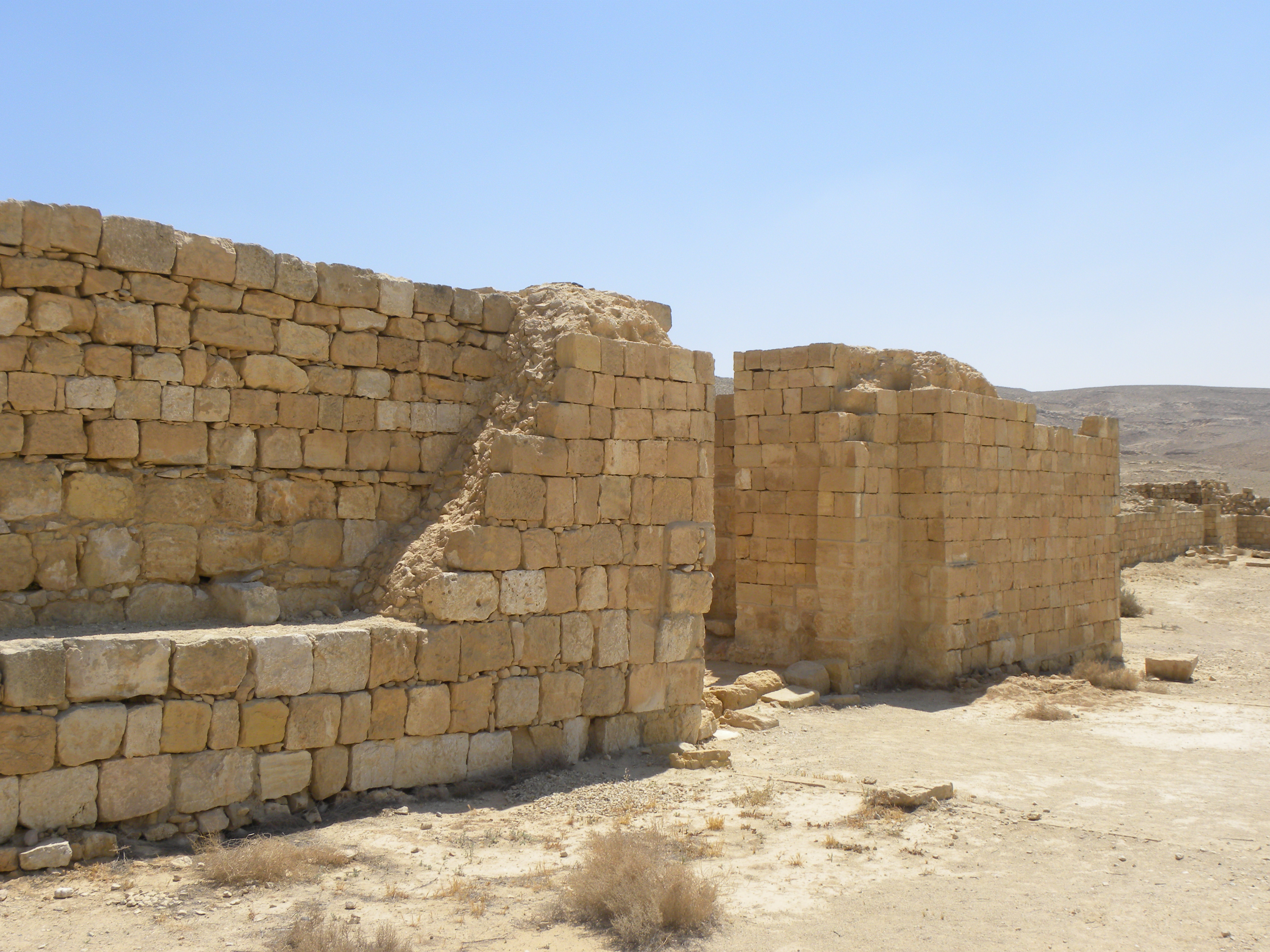
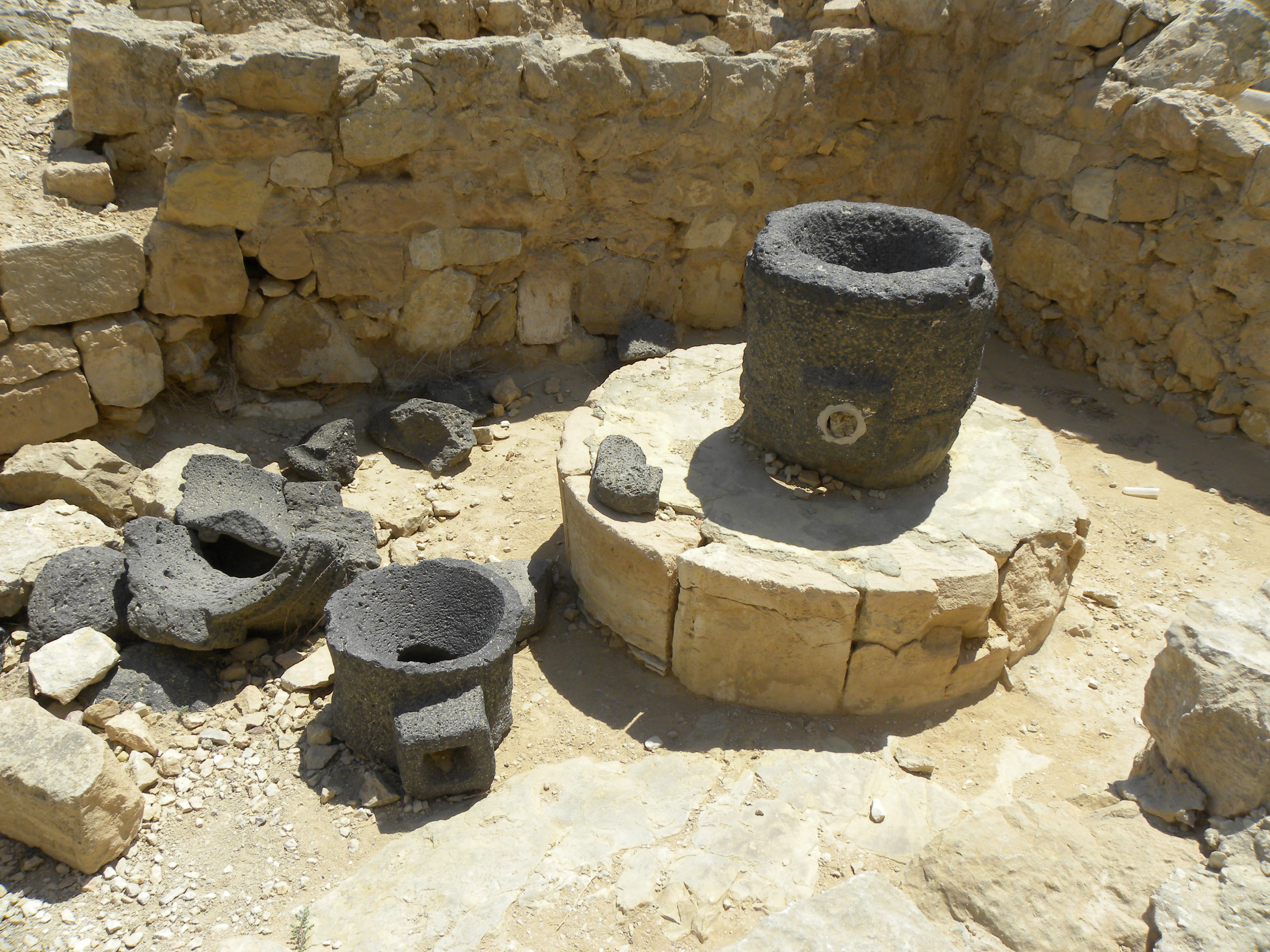
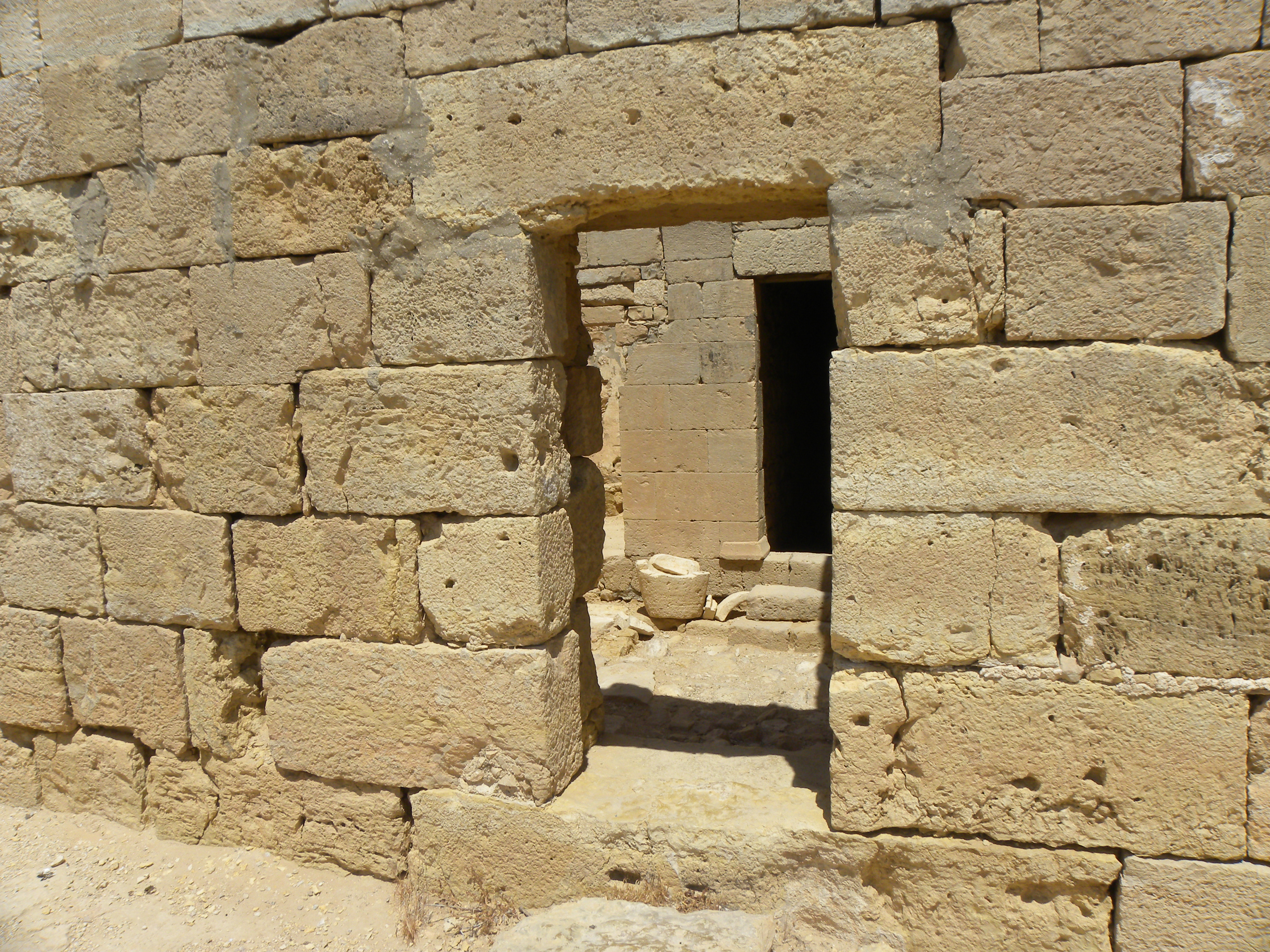
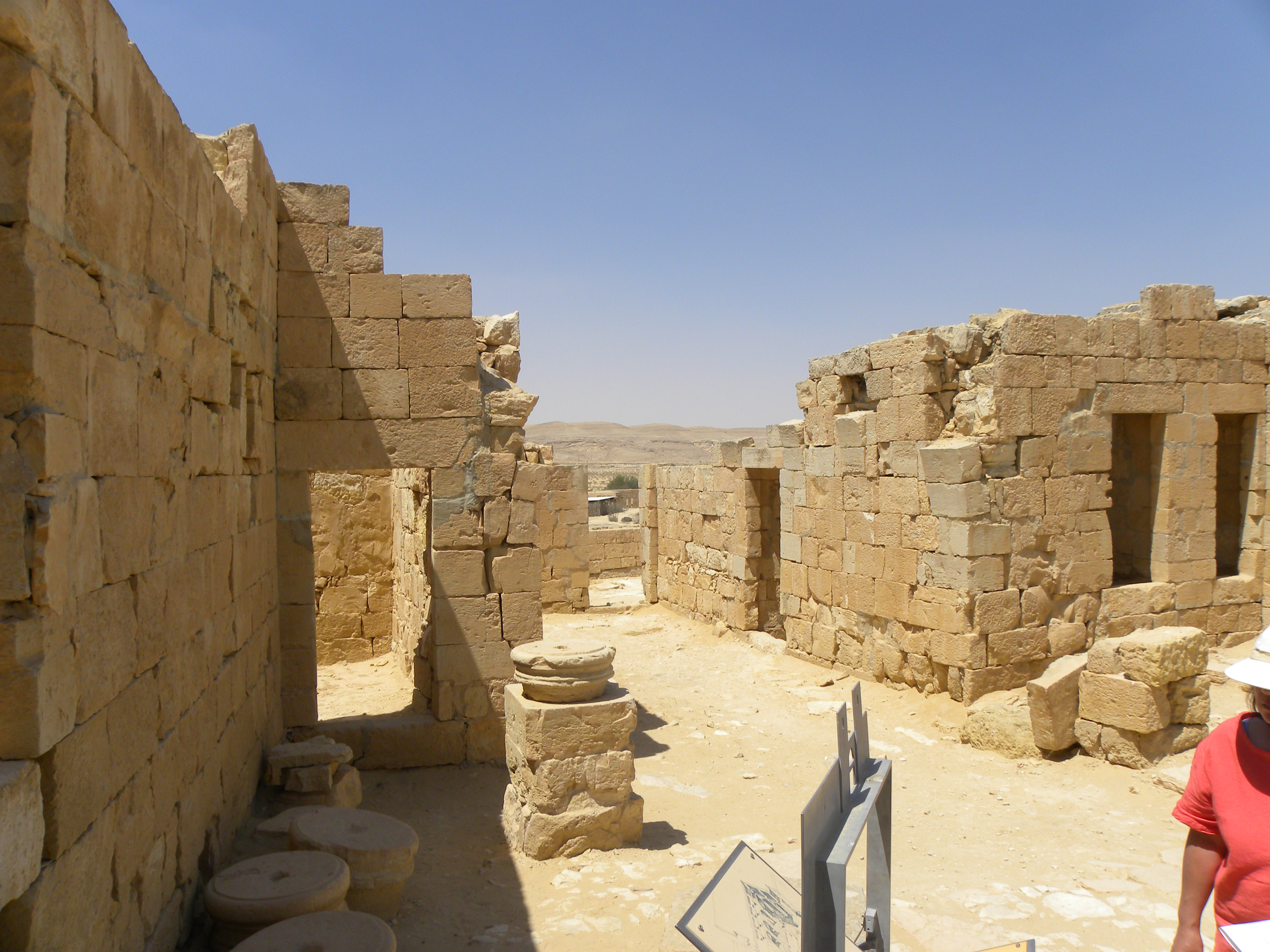
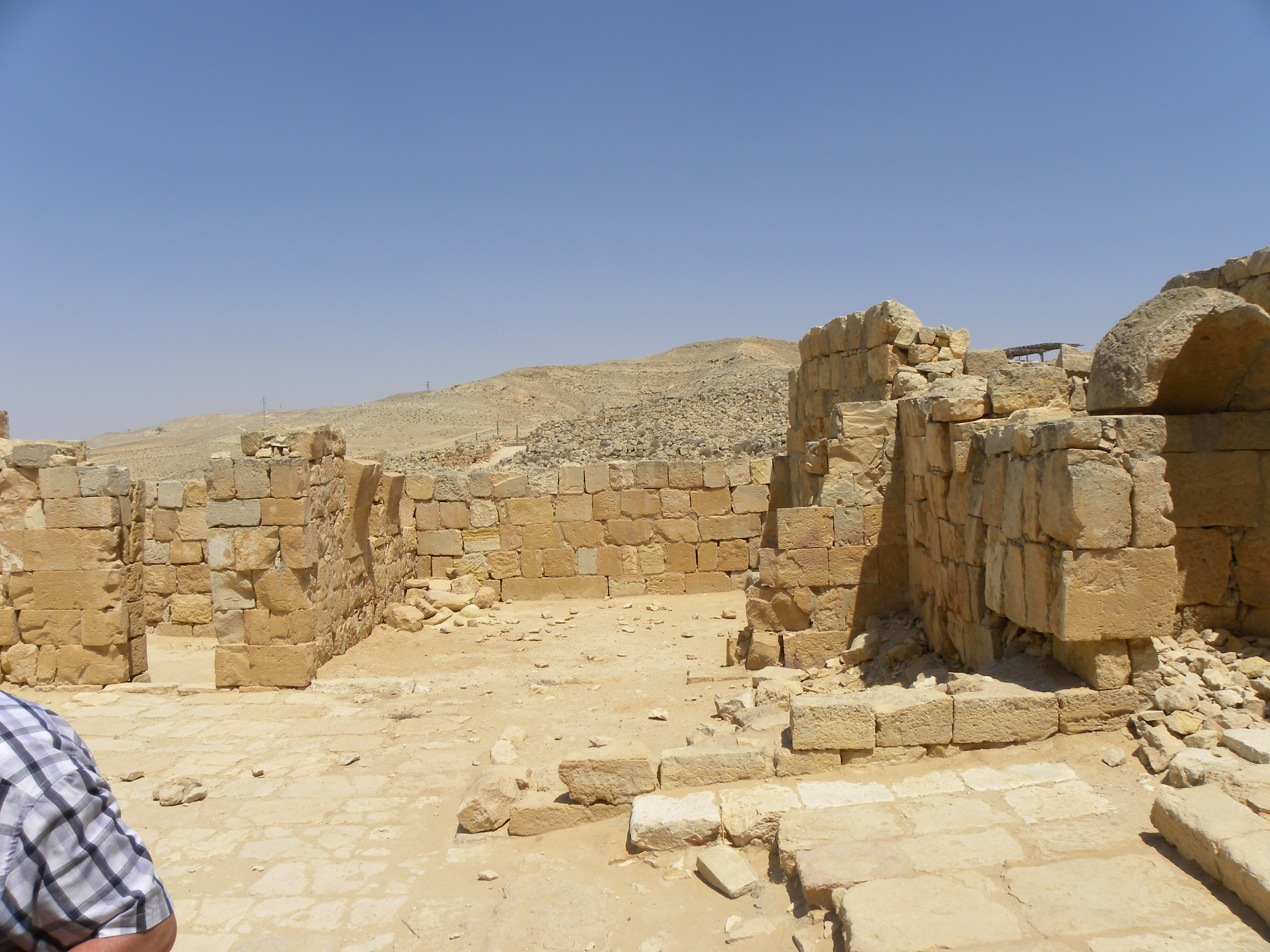
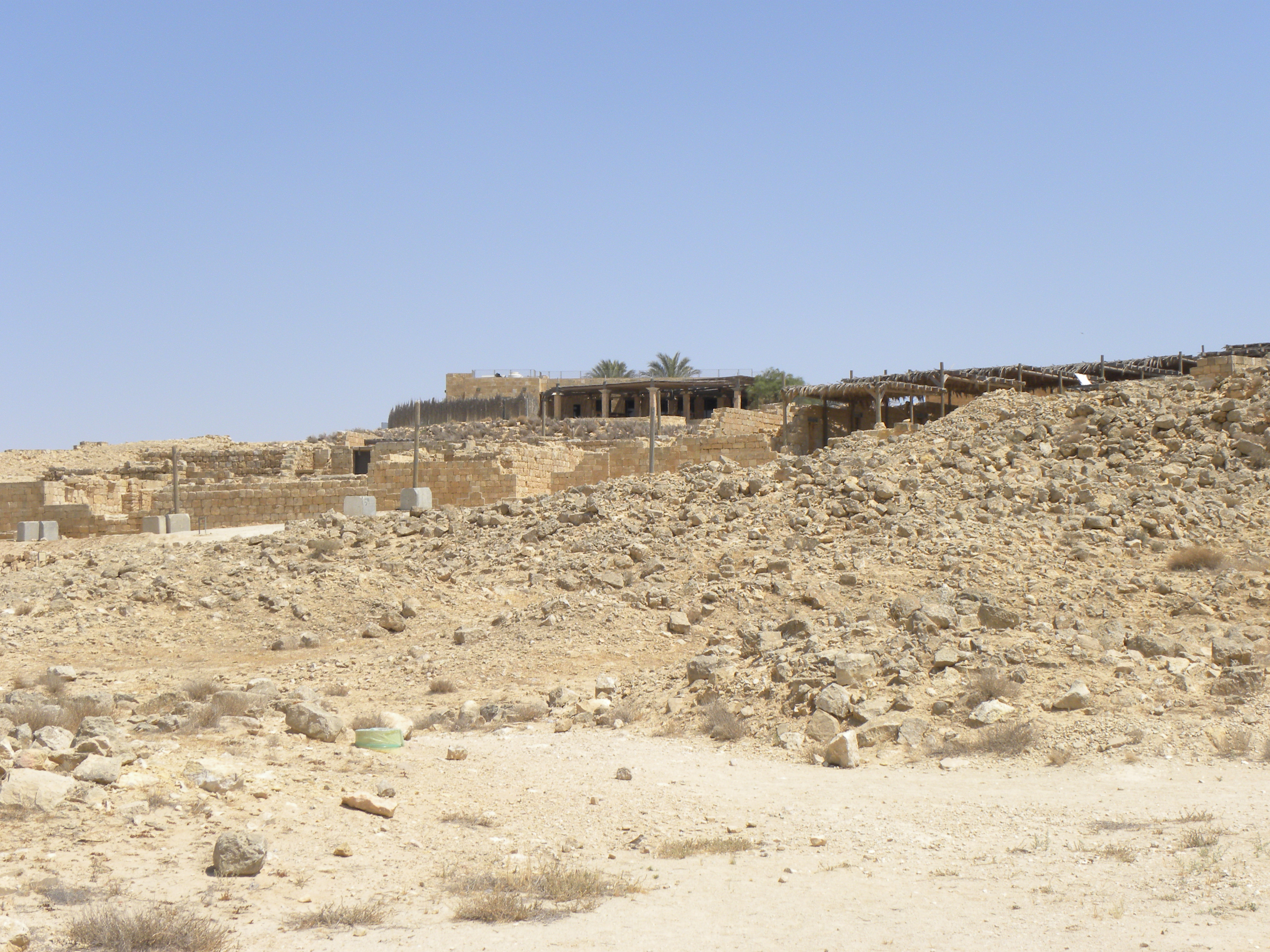
Nabatean remains at Mampsis.

Mampsis (Medieval Greek: Μάμψις) or Memphis (Ancient Greek: Μέμφις), today Mamshit (Hebrew: ממשית), Arabic Kurnub, is a former Nabataean caravan stop and Byzantine city. In the Nabataean period, Mampsis was an important station on the Incense Road, connecting Southern Arabia through Edom, the Arabah and Ma'ale Akrabim, to the Mediterranean ports, as well as to Jerusalem via Beersheba and Hebron. The city covers 10 acres (40,000 m^{2}) and is the smallest but best restored ancient city in the Negev Desert. The once-luxurious houses feature unusual architecture not found in any other Nabataean city.

The reconstructed city gives the visitor a sense of how Mampsis once looked. Entire streets have survived intact, and there are also large groups of Nabataean buildings with open rooms, courtyards, and terraces. The stones are carefully chiseled and the arches that support the ceiling are remarkably well constructed.

The Incense Route – Desert Cities in the Negev, including Mampsis, Haluza, Avdat, and Shivta, were declared a World Heritage Site by UNESCO in June 2005.

=== The Hauran ===
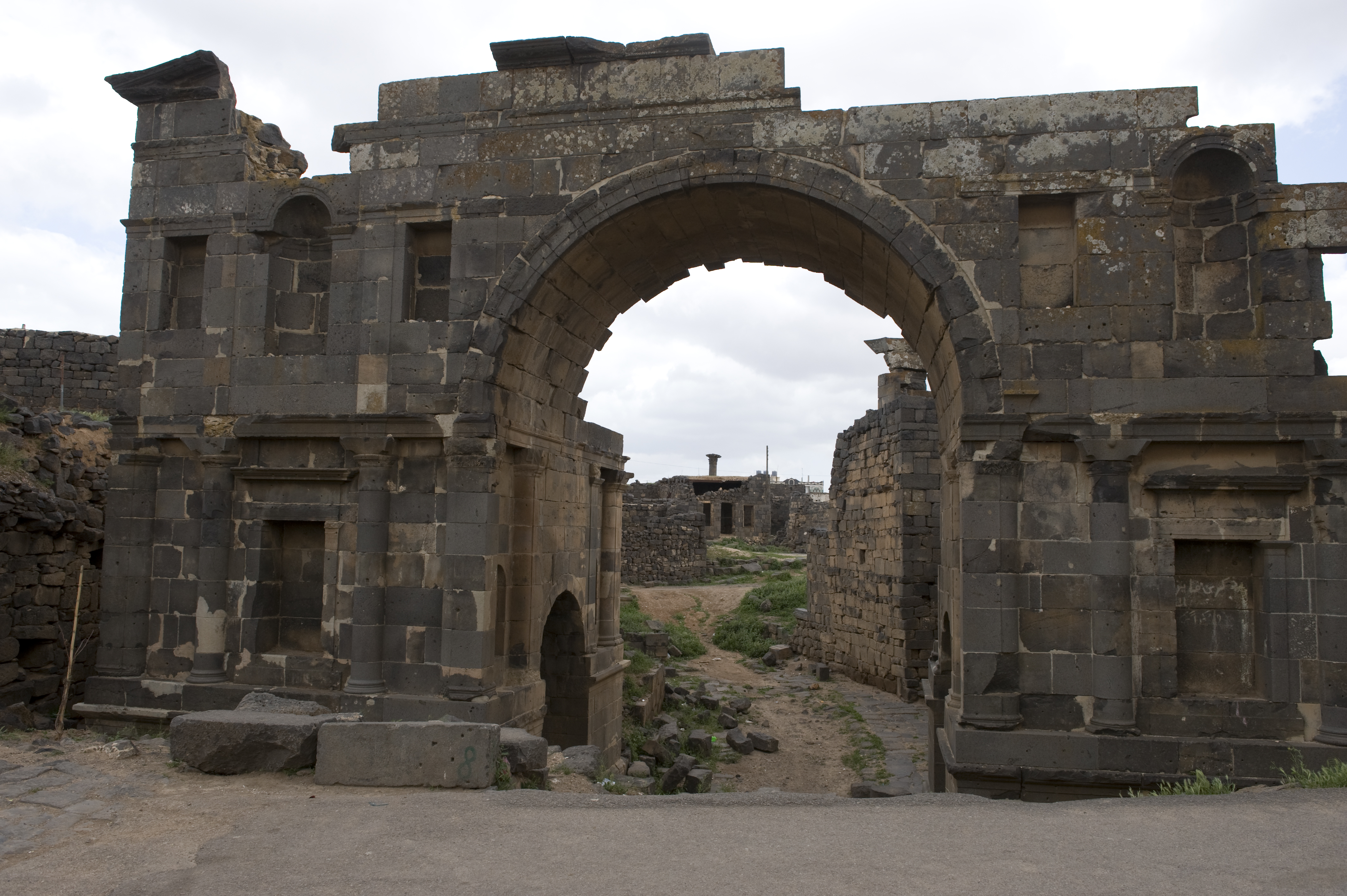
The Nabataean gate in Bosra, Syria

Bosra which is located in southern Syria, and was the northern capital of the Nabataean kingdom. Bosra has evidence of temples being located at major intersections of the city. At the city center is a temple complex dedicated to Dushara-A’ra. A’ra is thought to be the god of Nabataean kings and city of Bostra itself. Modern building make it difficult to find archaeological evidence of Nabataean cult worship. An inscription that reads “This is the wall which ... and windows which Taymu bar ... built for ... Dushara and the rest of the gods of Bostra” is located on what is thought to be this temple.

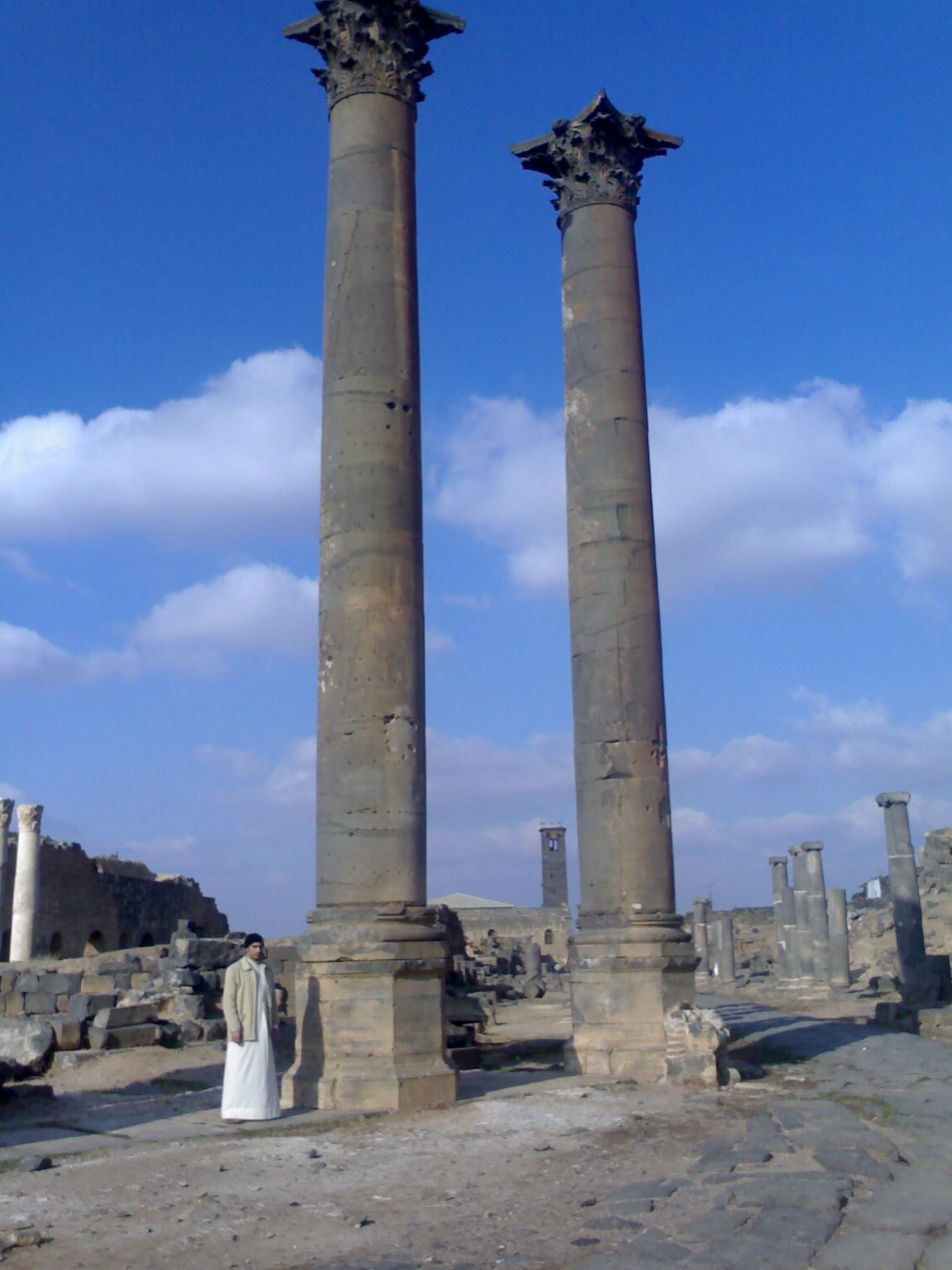
Colossal Nabataean columns stand in Bosra, Syria

Seeia which is located north of Bostra near Canatha. The settlement has three large temples, the largest is dedicated to Baalshamin. The two smaller temples are to unknown deities. One contains an inscription to the local goddess, Seeia, and may have been used to worship her. The temple complex is not Nabataean in design, but is an amalgamation of architectural building styles from the cultures on the northern Nabataean border. Seeia (Seia, Sî) in northern Hauran (ancient Auranitis), boasted 3 temples and a necropolis (but see cationary note by A. Negeve here-above).

Sahr temples similar in style to the ones located in Wadi Rumm, Dharih, Tannur, and Qasrawet. Sur temples similar in style to the ones located in Wadi Rumm, Dharih, Tannur, and Qasrawet. Al-Suweida Temples similar to those located near Petra in Wadi Rumm, Dharih, Tannur, and Qasrawet. Nabataean inscription indicate cults dedicated to Allat and Baalshamin.

=== Central Jordan ===
Khirbet Al-Tannur

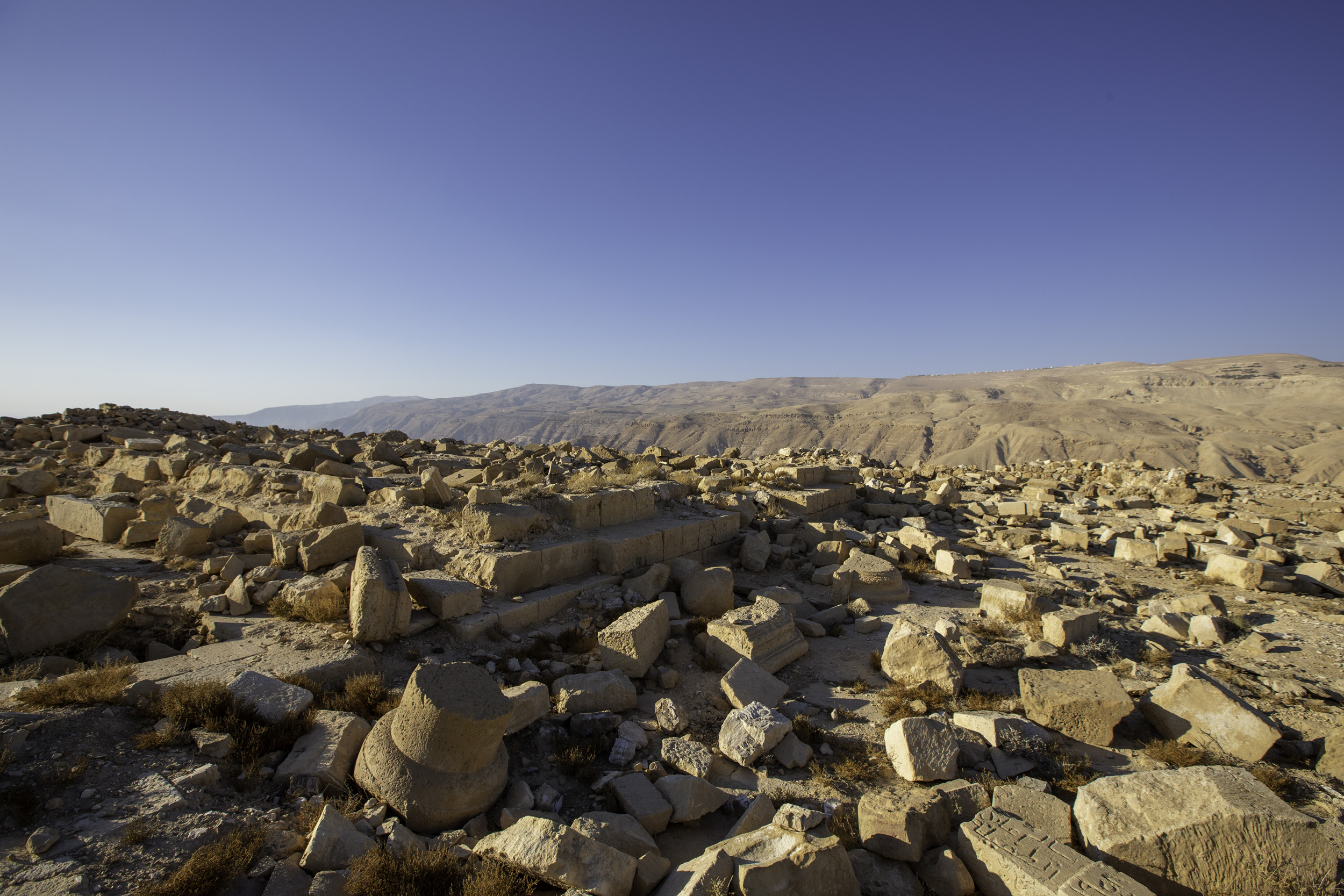
Khirbet Al-Tannur

Located in Central Jordan. The temple, High place, is located alone, atop the summit of Jebal Tannur. It is only accessible via a single, steep staircase pathway. The sites seclusion may indicate that it was of high religious importance to the Nabataeans. The doorway to the inner sanctuary of the temple is decorated with representations of vegetation, foliage, and fruits. Glueck identifies these as representing the Syrian goddess Atargatis. The inner sanctuary decorated with images of fruit, fishes, vegetation, thunderbolts, as well as representation of deities. Glueck attributes these iconographies to the Mesopotamian storm-god Hadad, but Tyche and Nike are also represented. Starckly notes that the only named god is the Edomite weather god, Qos. An inscription on a stele at the site names him as the god of Hurawa.

Khirbet edh-Dharih

Located 7 km south of Hurawa, the temple at Khirbet edh-Dharih is astonishingly well preserved. The temple complex is surrounded by an outer and inner courtyard, with a paved pathway to the porticoes. There are also has benches the form a theatron. The temple itself is divided into three sections, in a large open vestibule. From here is the cella, which was painted in rich, vibrant colors. At the back of the cella was the motab and betyl, a square podium flanked by stairs which was the seat of the divine. Despite its good condition, it is not known which god would have been worshipped here.

=== Residential architecture ===
Residential buildings includes palaces, large urban houses, rural houses, and simple small houses usually made out of the local materials found in the region. Relatively little archaeological research has been done in the residential areas of Petra. Work in Petra's az-Zantur area has indicated that there has been an evolution from non-permanent housing (tents) to built structures, with sedentarisation happening only gradually and tents coexisting with stately mansions even in later phases of evolution. Even the well-researched, stone-built and elaborately decorated Nabataean az-Zantur mansion consisted of a sumptuous representational wing, with western stucco and fresco decoration, and a simple residential wing. There were also caves used for residential purposes. The residential area in Hegra is located in the middle of the plain, far from the outcrops. The primary material of construction for the houses and the enclosing wall was sun-dried mudbrick. Few vestiges of the residential area remain.

=== Public space ===
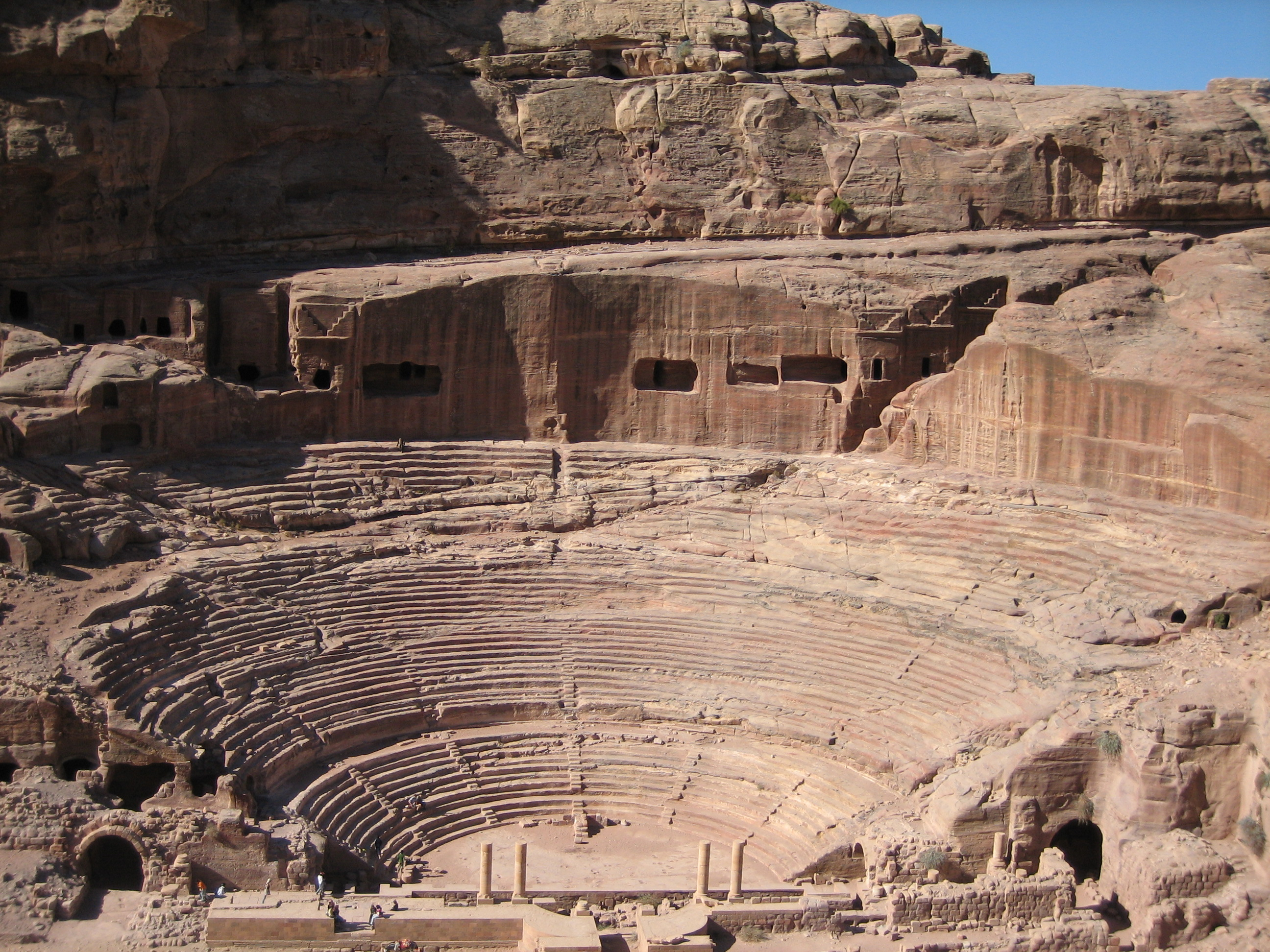
The Nabataean Petra theater built by king Aretas IV (9 BC-40 AD),

The monuments of Petra are a well-known example of this type of use of Nabatean architecture, these architectural works include all types of public buildings in addition to private buildings. The architectural elements of the urban area of Petra were built according to the city's general urban plan, as the main streets were influenced by the Roman city plans. Those places divided the city into two halves, both of which aligns with the valley, the Nabatean engineers also built several canals under the streets' ground.

A little farther from the Treasury, at the foot of the mountain called en-Nejr, is a massive theatre, positioned so as to bring the greatest number of tombs within view. At the point where the valley opens out into the plain, the site of the city is revealed with striking effect. The theatre was cut into the hillside and into several of the tombs during its construction. Rectangular gaps in the seating are still visible. Almost enclosing it on three sides are rose-coloured mountain walls, divided into groups by deep fissures and lined with knobs cut from the rock in the form of towers. The theatre was said to hold around 8,500 people. The performances that audiences were able to attend here were poetry readings and dramas. Gladiator fights were also said to be held here and attracted the most audience, although no gladiator was able to gain any momentum or fame due to the heavy mortality rate that came with it. The theatre was one of many structures in Petra that took significant damage due to the 363 Galilee earthquake.

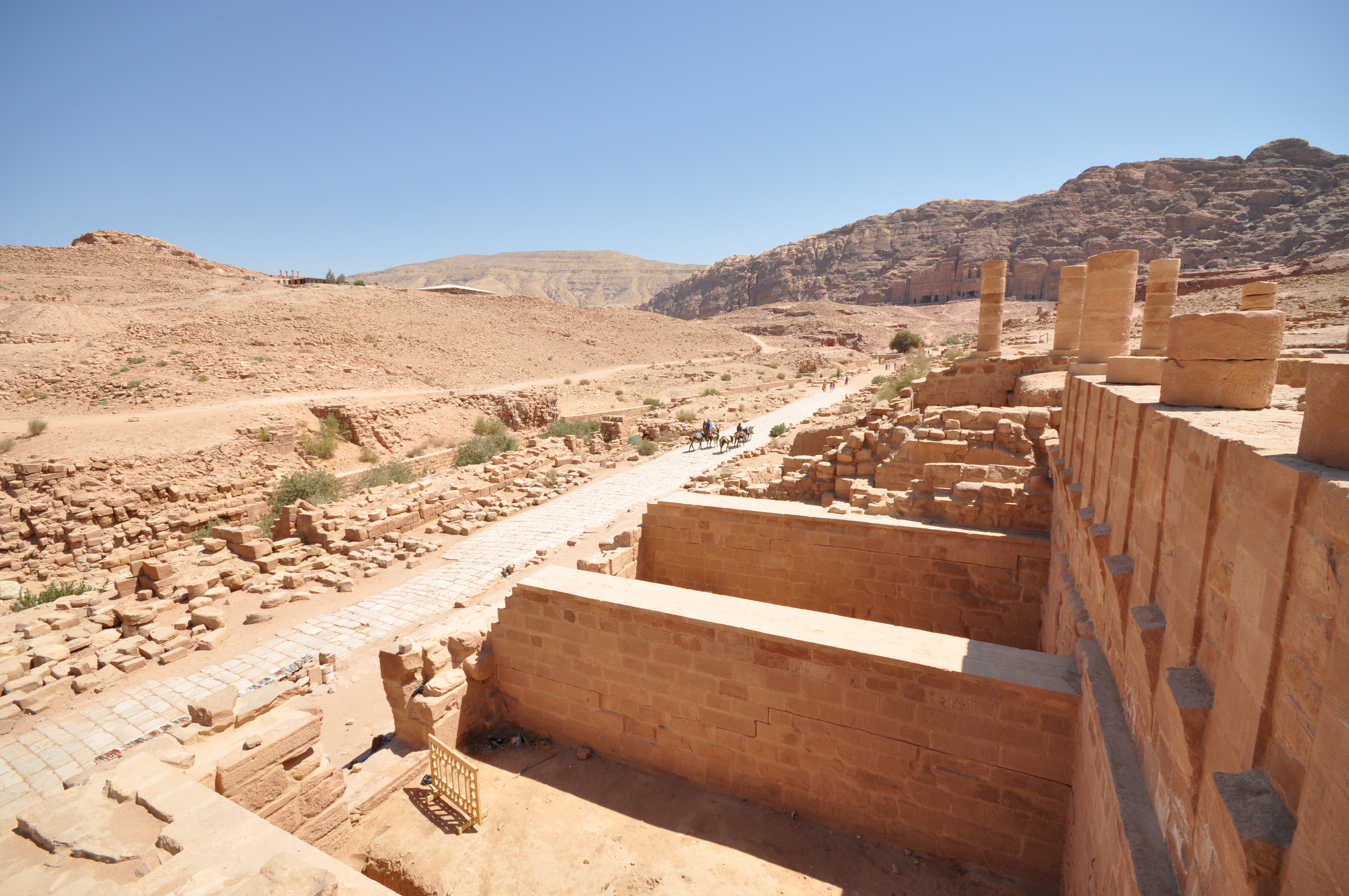
Petra Pool and Garden Complex

The Petra Pool and Garden Complex is a series of structures within the city center. Originally said to be a market area, excavations at the site have allowed scholars to identify it as an elaborate Nabataean garden, which included a large swimming pool, an island-pavilion, and an intricate hydraulic system.

Ahead of the Petra Pool and Garden Complex, lies Colonnaded street, which is among few artifacts of Petra that was constructed rather than natural. This street used to hold a semi-circle nymphaeum, which is now in ruins due to flash flooding, and used to hold Petra's only tree. This was intended to be a symbol for the peaceful atmosphere that the Nabataens were able to construct in Petra. Once the Romans took control of the city, Colonnaded street was narrowed to make room for a side walk, and 72 columns were added to each side.

=== Funerary architecture ===
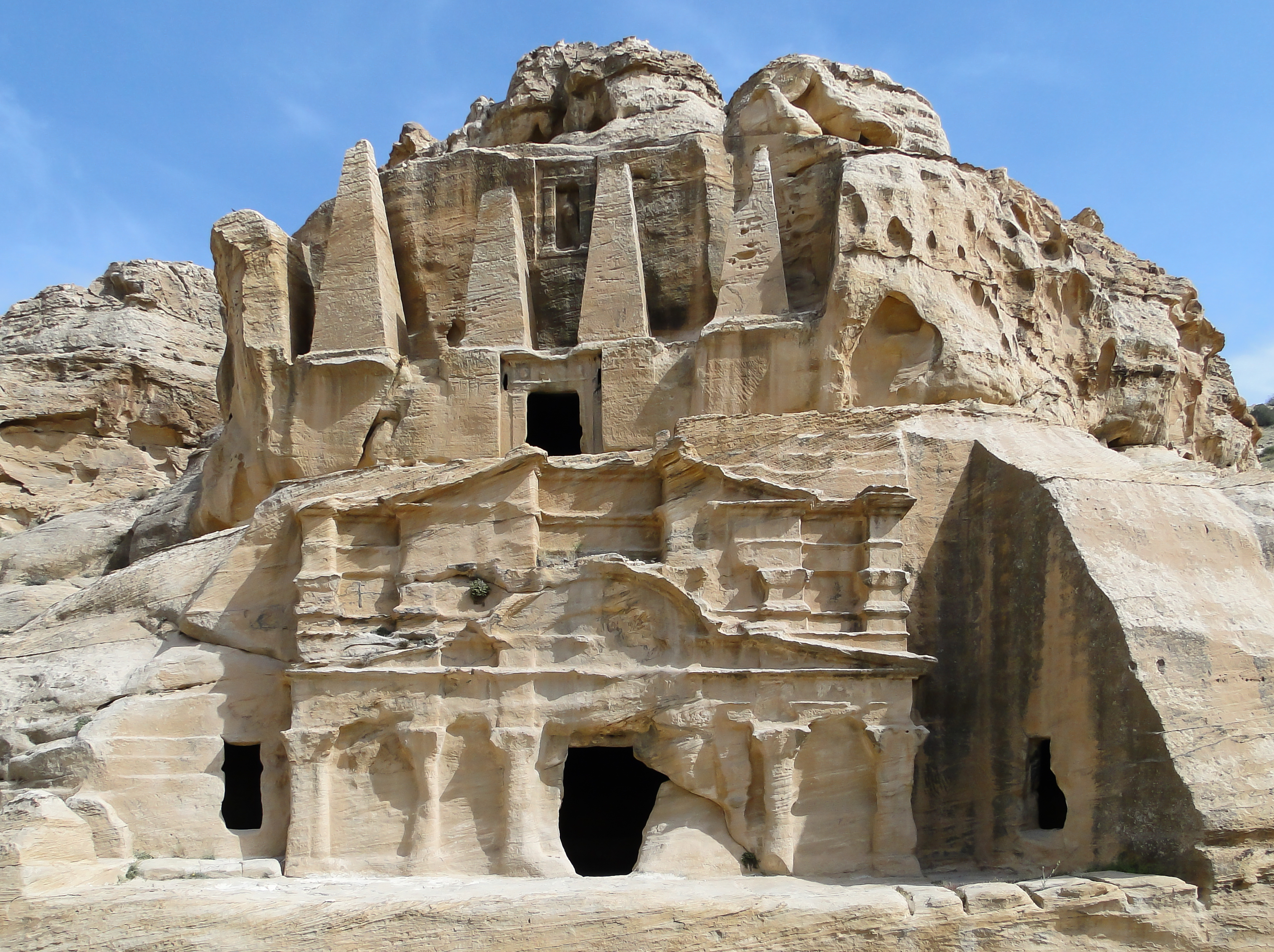
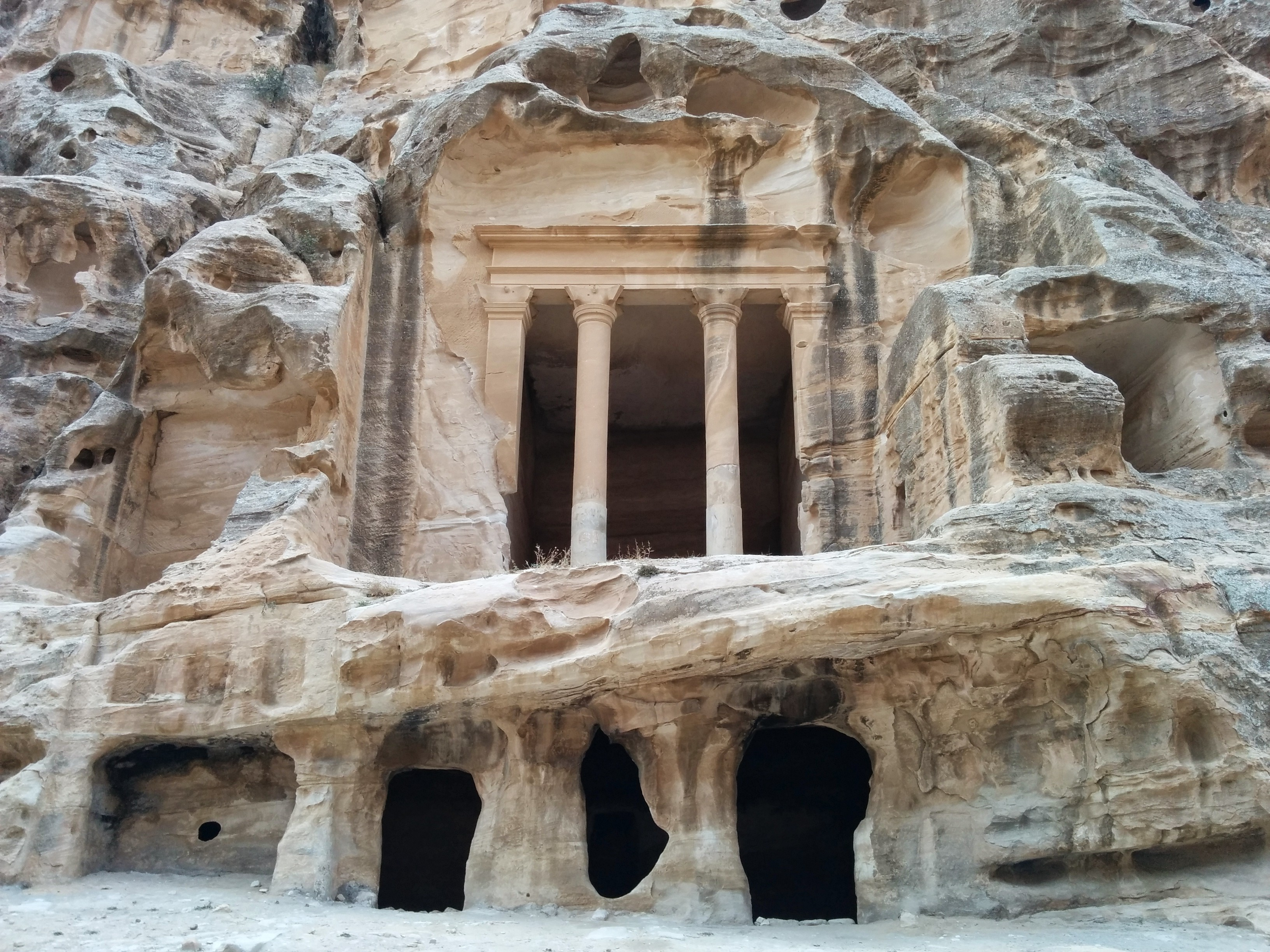
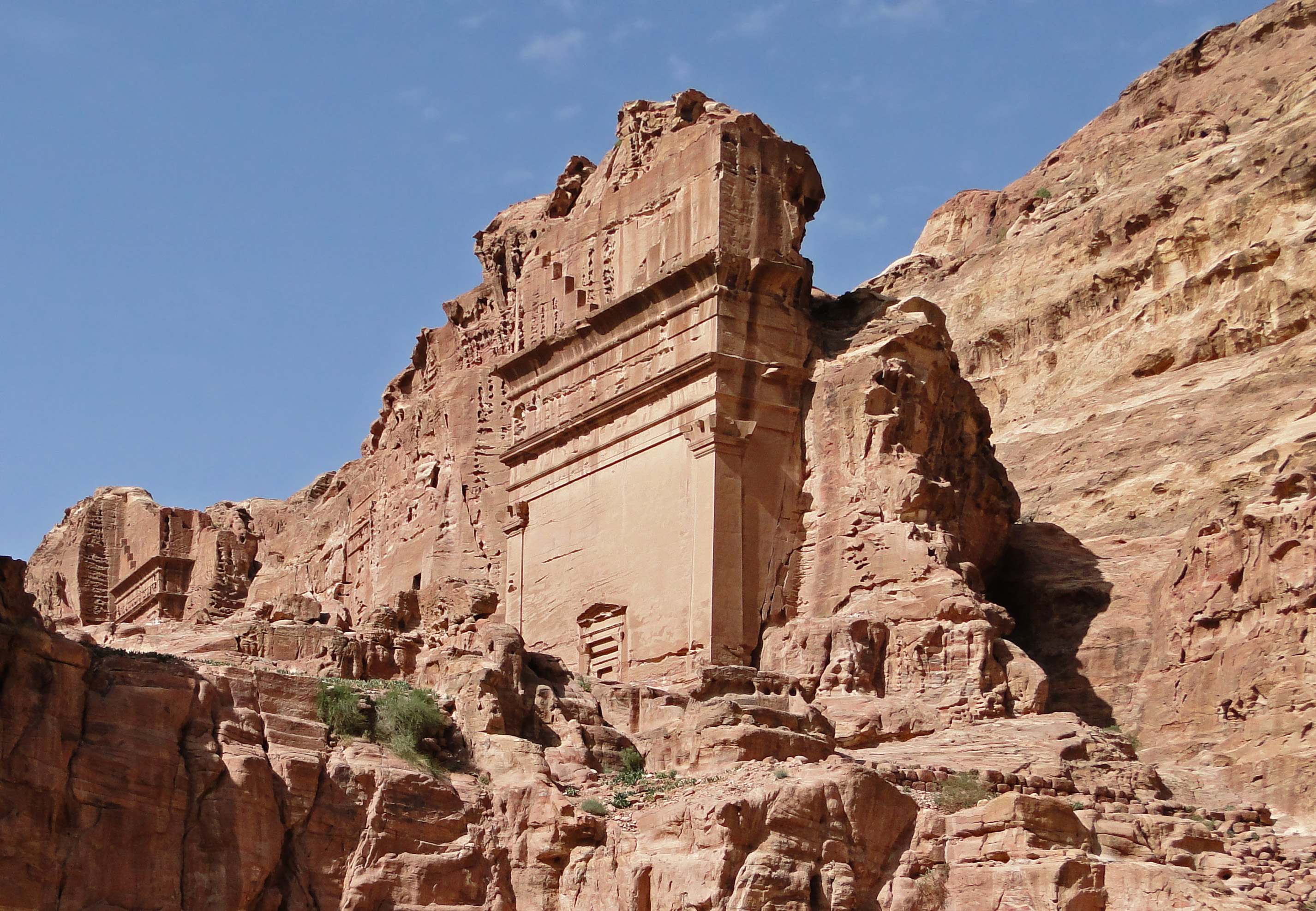
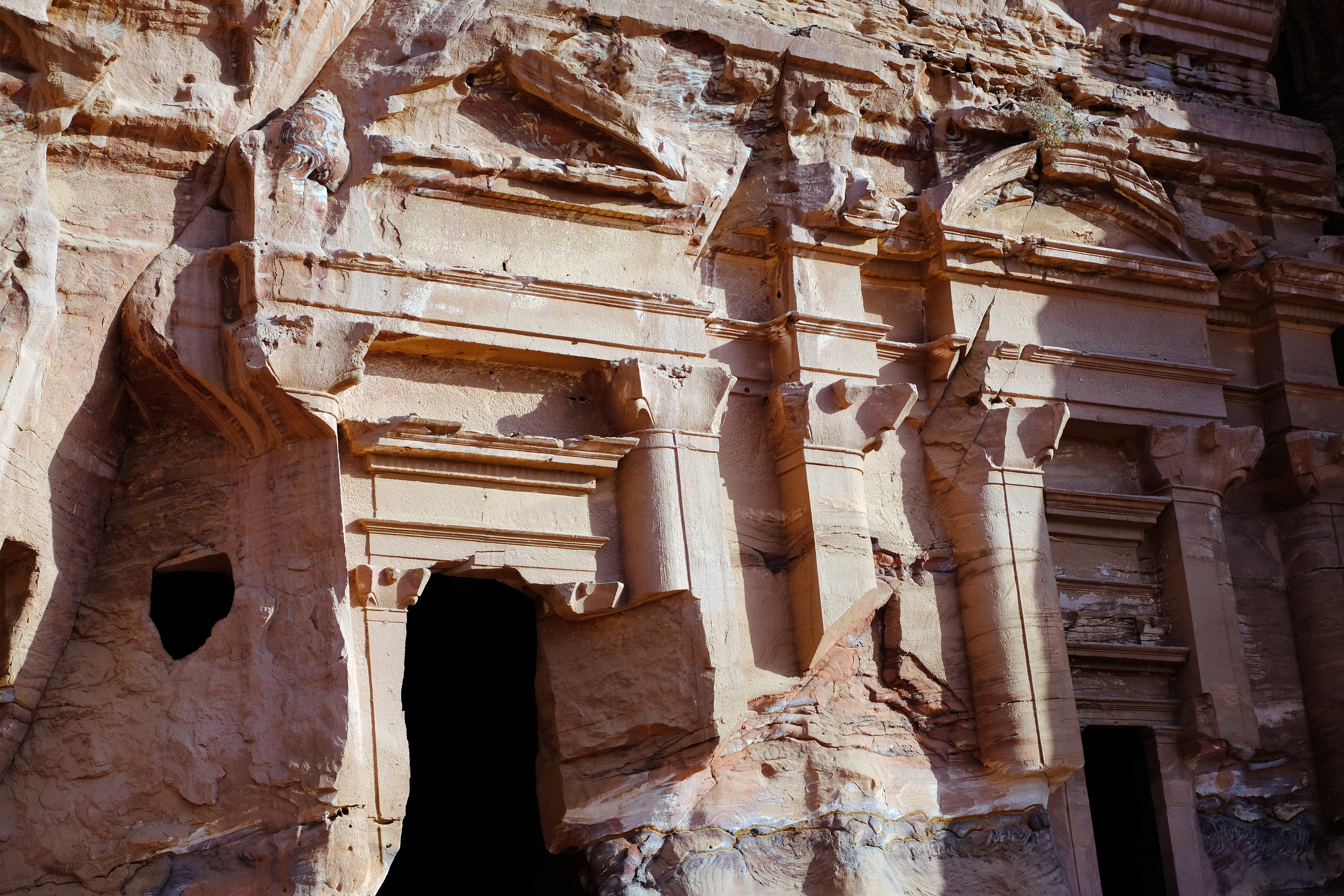
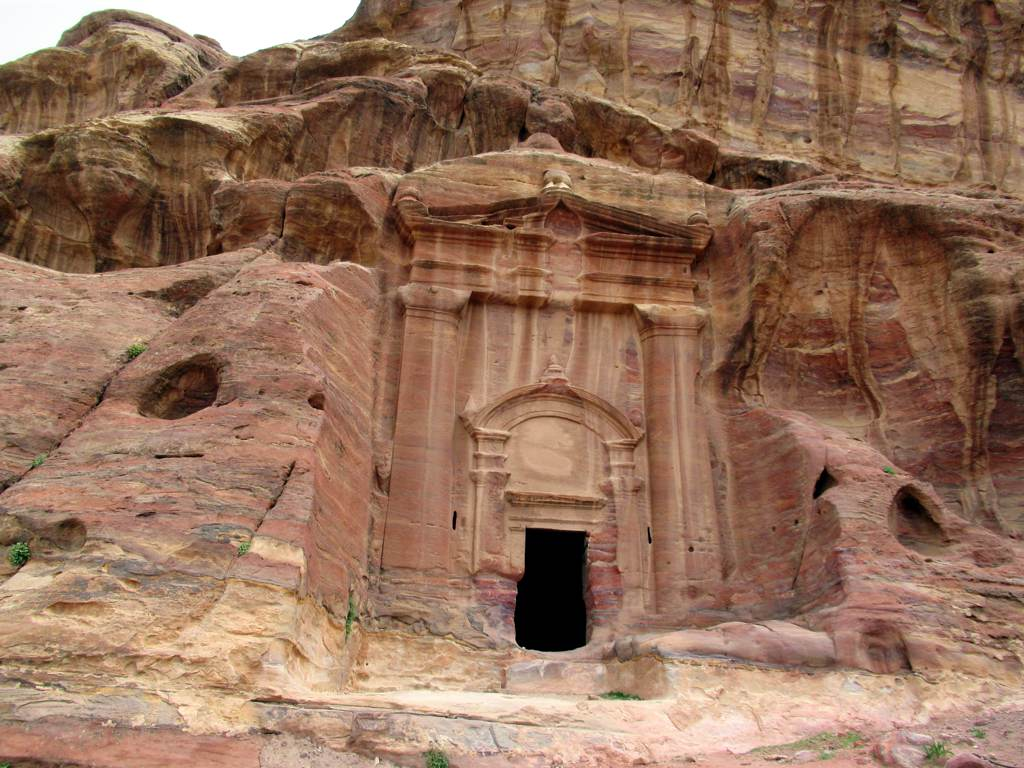
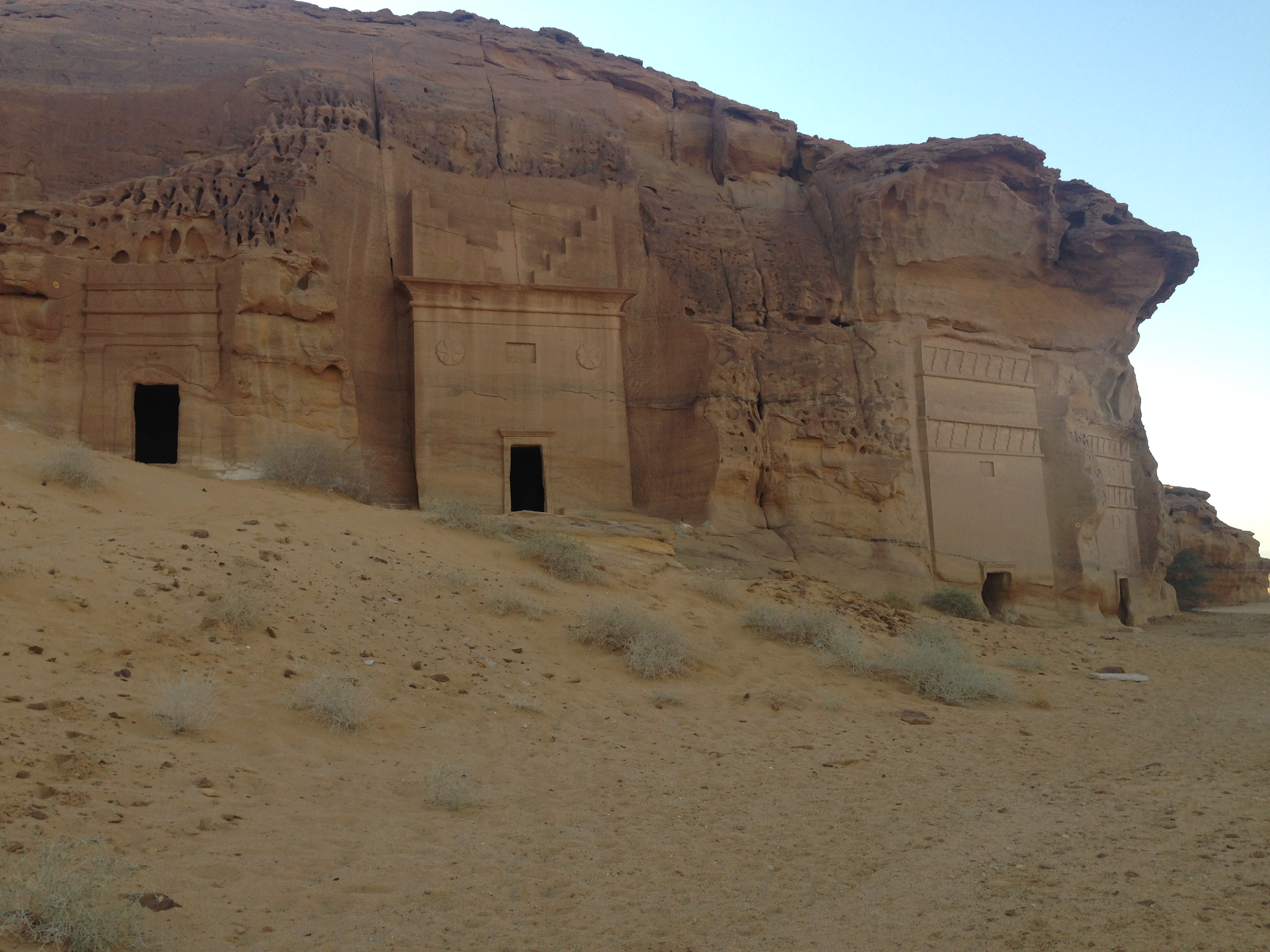
Photos of various Nabatean tombs, the Nabataean order on top of the buildings' columns is a distinctive order only found in Nabataean cities like Bosra and Petra.

Funerary monuments were represented by carved royal tombs and tombs built with cut stone. The Nabataeans paid great attention to their tombs, this was reflected in their architecture, in which a lot of architectural and artistic methods of respecting the dead were developed, which suggests the Nabataeans' interest in the afterlife. Of the most famous Nabatean monuments are the carved royal tombs. Several archeological studies which have been conducted on them have concluded that the Nabataean engineer combined external influences from neighboring Arab and non-Arab civilizations with the Nabataean architectural style. Many of these tombs can be seen in different places in and around Petra, especially on the way before reaching the Siq. Among the famous Petra funerary monuments are: The Obelisk tomb, The Urn tomb, and the Windowed Tomb.

Nabataean tombs are primarily "Rock-Cut tombs." They are created from cutting directly into the landscape, traditionally rock (see Rock-cut tombs in ancient Palestine). Rock-cut tombs are the most frequently found within excavated Nabataean archeological sites. There have been nearly 900 rock-cut tombs found in Petra and Hegra. Nabataean tombs are a fusion Hellenistic and Roman styles as well as a gradual creation of the Nabataean style. Some offer features of clear Greek influence, such as pediments, metope and triglyph entablatures, and capitals. They were built to honour gods and leaders as well as house generations of a specific family. Tombs are located normally inside the city. These tombs are simple in style but elaborated in function, often featuring steps, platforms, libation holes, cisterns, water channels and sometimes banqueting halls. Many feature numerous religious icons, inscriptions, and sanctuaries found in association with springs, catchment pools, and channels.

Crenelated tombs (see crenelation) were also popular within Nabataean architecture. There are several variations of crenelation, wavering in number of tiers. Crenelated tombs were created in order to represent fortifications, creating a symbol of cities, strength, military power. Later, under Achaemenid Persians, the fortification context was removed, giving a greater scope to a sign of kingship and authority.

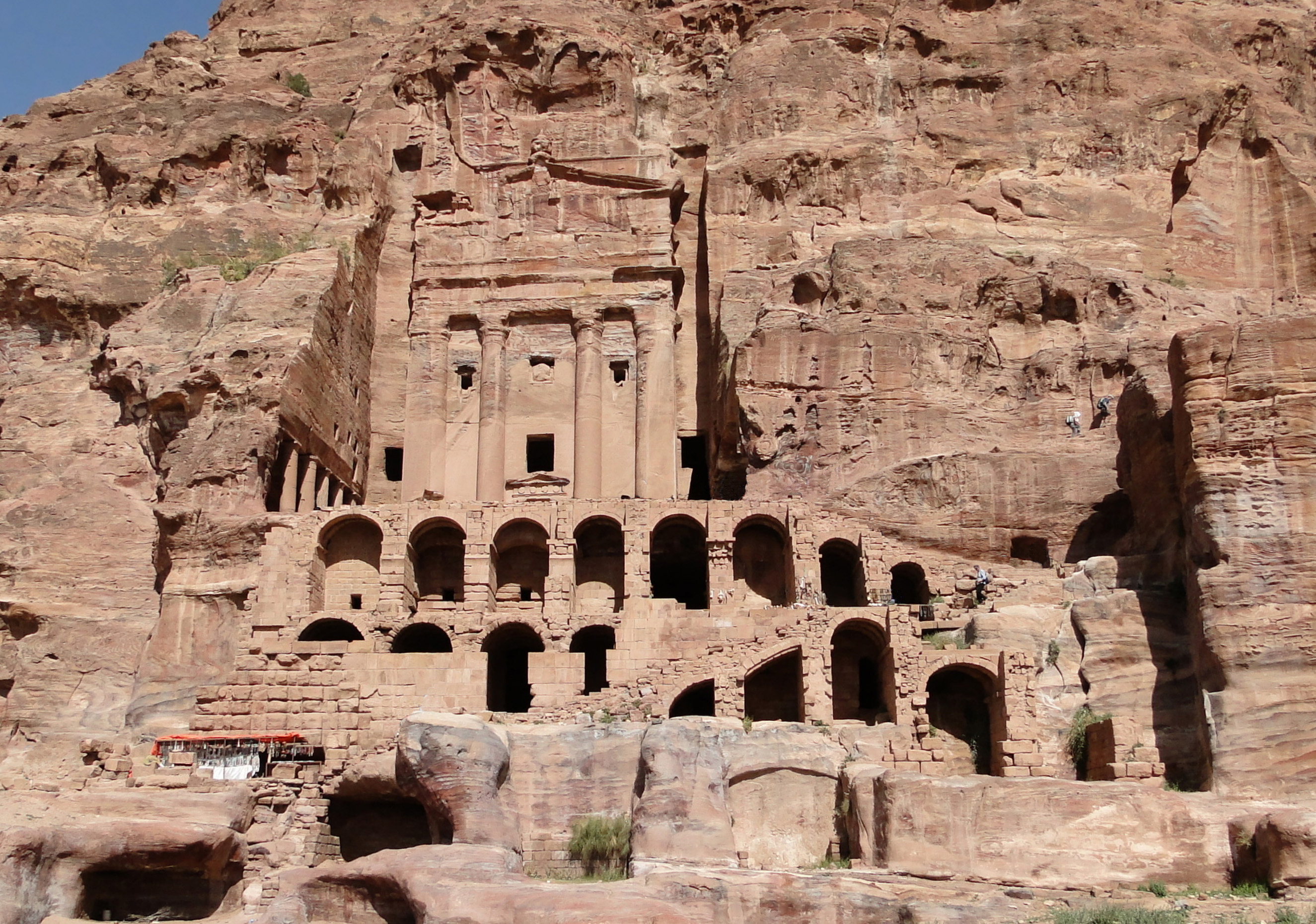
Urn Tomb, Petra

Several tombs feature obelisks on their exterior. Obelisks are a narrow tapering monument, often used to represent the Nephesh, specific leaders, and gods of monolithic societies. They are often found in Near Eastern and Egyptian architecture.

Tombs with detailed facades are also quite popular in the Nabataean community. There are a total of eight different façade types: Single Pylon, Double Pylon, Step, Proto-Hegr, Hegr, Arch, Simple Classical and Complex Classical. Single Pylon, Double Pylon, Step, Proto-Hegr, and Hegr are characterised by variations on the crowstep motif, combined with elements from classical architecture. Arch, Simple Classical, and Complex Classical have only classical motifs, which have been given Nabataean interpretation.

At Petra, there is a series of tombs called the "Royal Tombs." These tombs are split into four sections: the Urn Tomb, the Silk Tomb, the Corinthian Tomb, and the Palace Tomb. The Urn Tomb is built high on the mountain side, and requires climbing up a number of flights of stairs. It has been suggested that this is the tomb of Nabataean King Malchus II who died in 70 AD. Beside it is the Silk Tomb, named from its rich color of the sandstone. The Corinthian Tomb is next, featuring Greek Corinthian columns. Finally the Palace Tomb with three distinct stories in its facade.

== Artistic elements ==
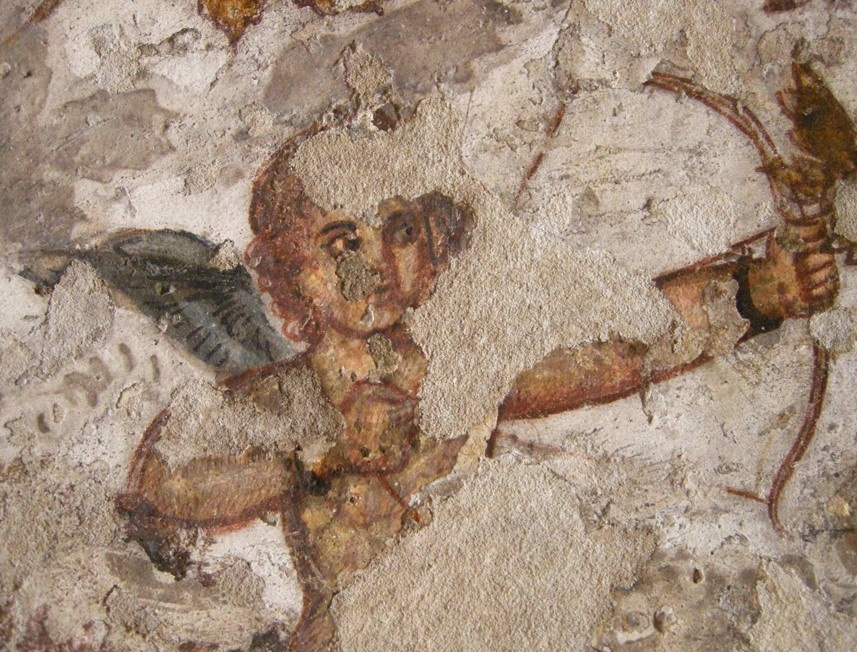
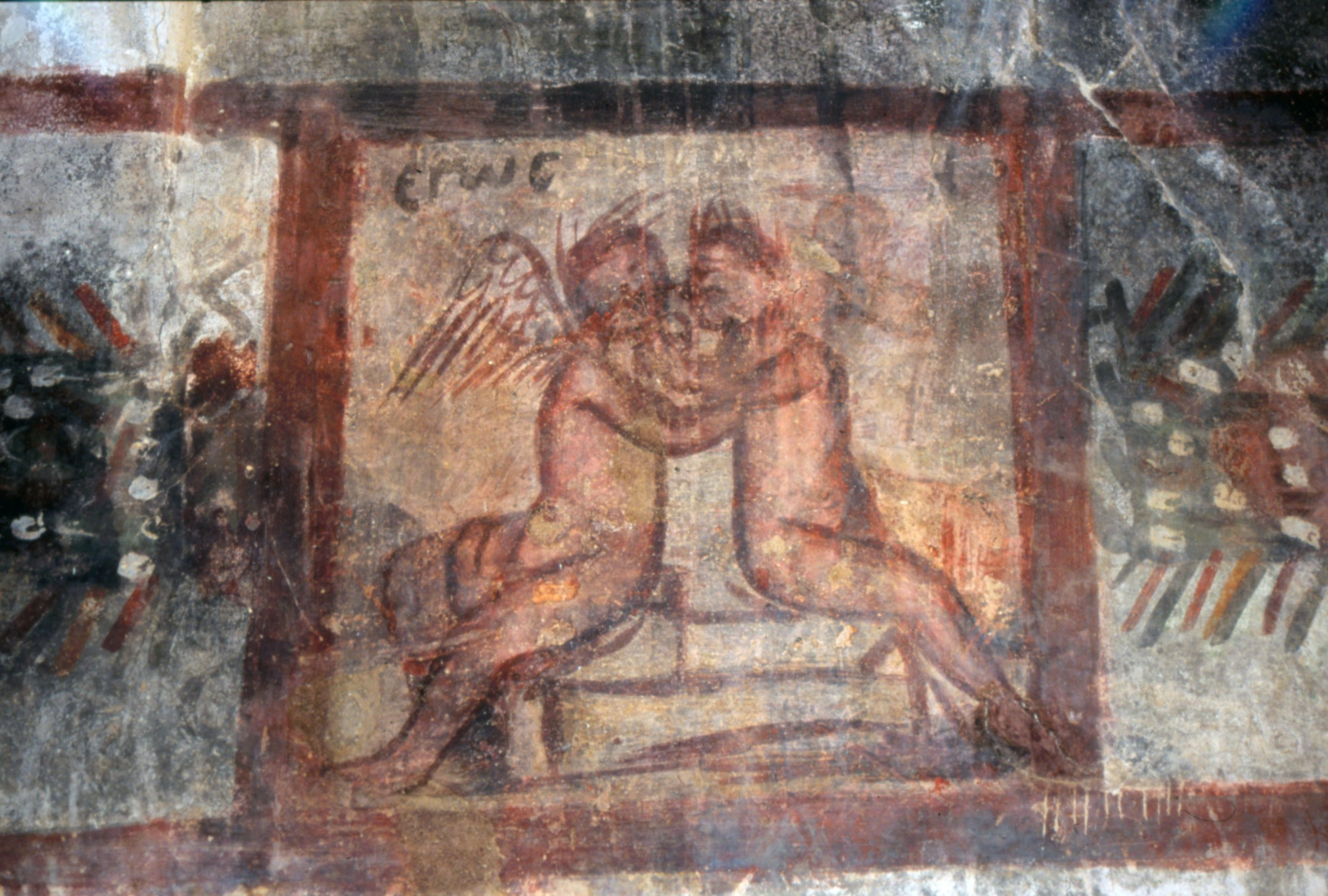
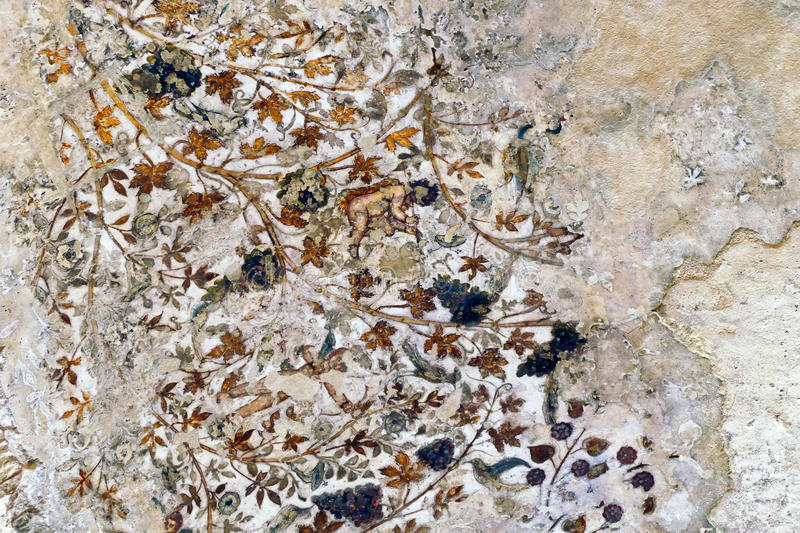
Nabatean Arab frescoes.

Few instances of Nabataean painting have survived. Most are fragments of purely decorative interior painting. There has been enough to demonstrate, however, that they follow the contemporary Hellenistic style, in which few paintings remain.

In 2010, it was revealed that a biclinium, now known colloquially as the Painted House, at Little Petra in Jordan had extensive ceiling frescoes, which had long been concealed under soot from Bedouin campfires, and other inscriptions in the ensuing centuries. A three-year restoration project had made them visible again. They depict, in extensive detail and with a variety of media, including glazes and gold leaf, imagery such as grapevines and putti associated with the Greek god Dionysus, suggesting the space may have been used for wine consumption, perhaps with visiting merchants. In addition to being the only known example of Nabataean interior figurative painting in situ, they are one of the very few examples of Hellenistic painting extant, and have been considered superior to later Roman imitations of the style at Herculaneum.

The wall paintings in the Painted Biclinium can be grouped into two major scenes. The larger chamber has its south wall decorated with stucco, creating faux architectural elements reminiscent of some Pompeian wall painting.

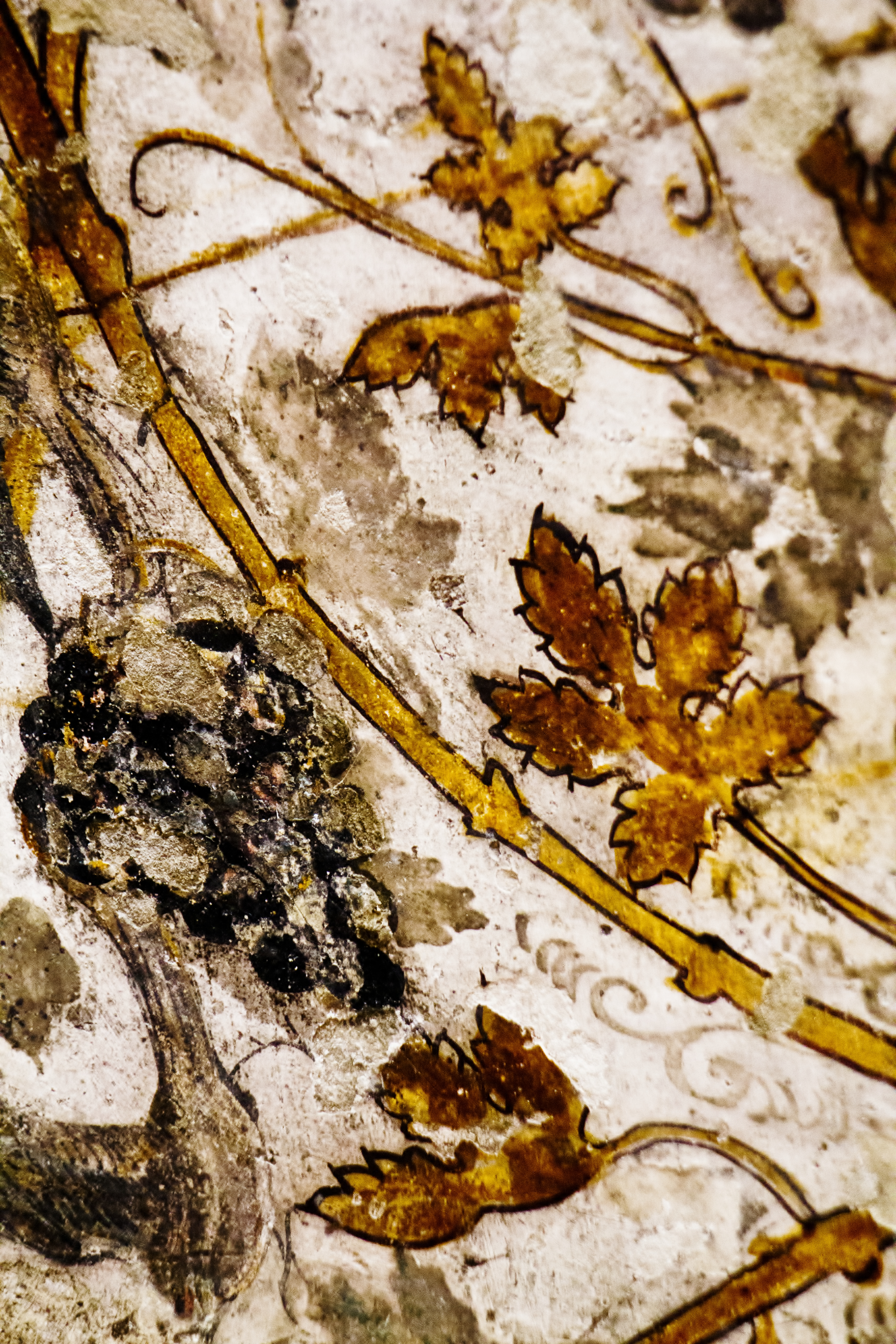
Details of one of the frescoes at the Biclinium, showing a grape vine.

The inner room has painted decoration in a completely different style than the larger outer room. Instead of architectural embellishment, the walls and vaulted ceiling of this room exhibit a complex program of intertwining vines, flowers, figures, several varieties of local birds, and insects. Several erotes—small winged gods associated with love and occasionally the cultivation of wine—are seen participating in viticulture management, using ladders and pruning hooks, carrying baskets of gathered grapes, and defending the vines from scavenging birds. The erotes are armed with bows, arrows, and spears. In addition to the domesticated and harvested grape vines, wild raspberry vines and field bindweed flowers wrap throughout the scene to pay homage to the local flora of Petra's northern hinterland. Twaissi et al. (2010) were able to identify an additional anthropomorphic figure in the scene in addition to the erotes, who they interpret as a representation of the Romanized Egyptian goddess. However, the overall iconographic scene and architectural parallels elsewhere in the area of Petra lend weight to the attribution of the space as a center of Dionysiac worship.

In addition to the figural and floral painting within the inner room of the Painted Biclinium, the room appears to have been further embellished with an intricate program of stuccoed decoration. Remnants of an entablature are preserved on the east and west walls of the room, and the center of the vault once held a stucco medallion.

=== Nabataean Order ===
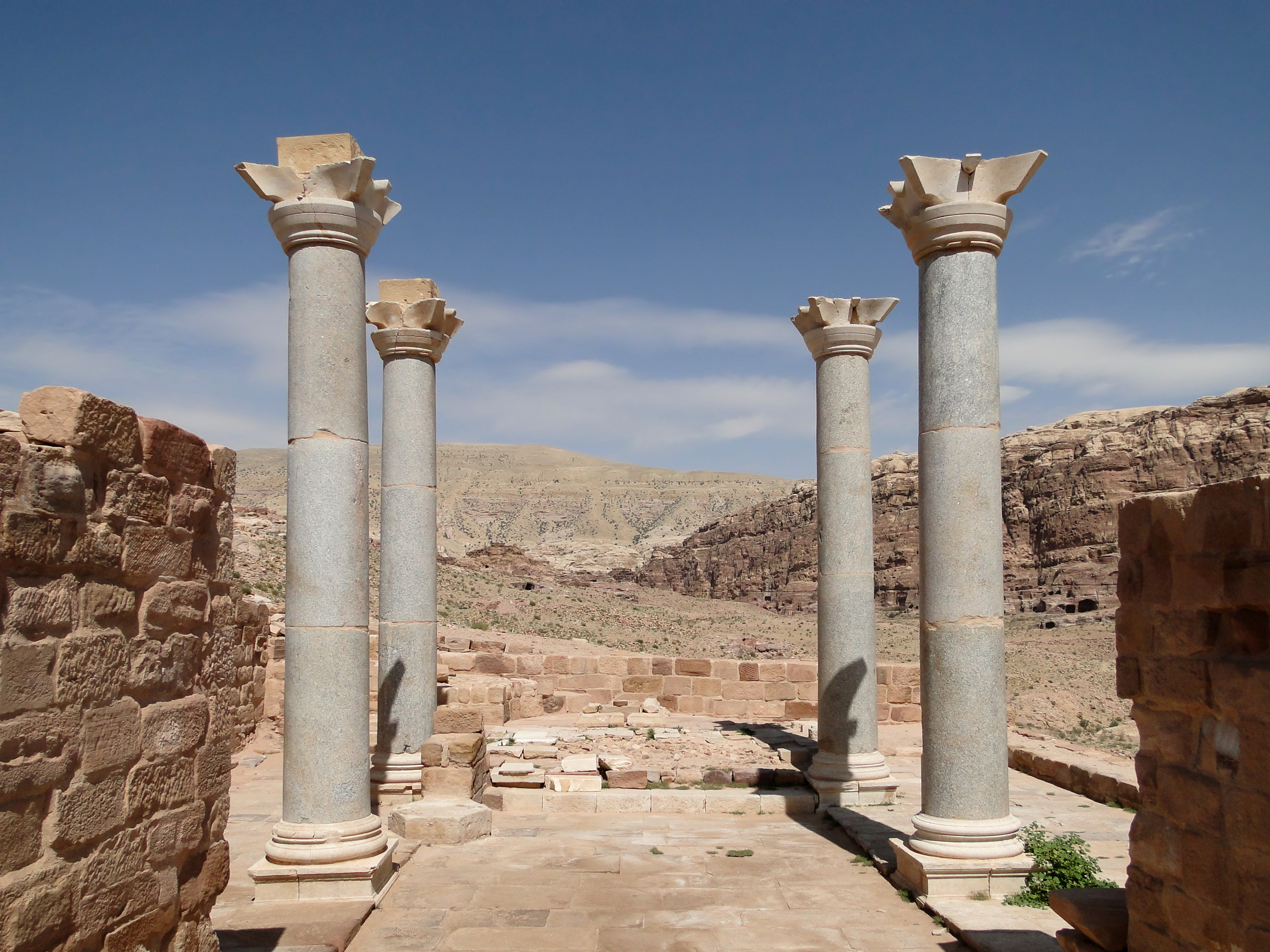
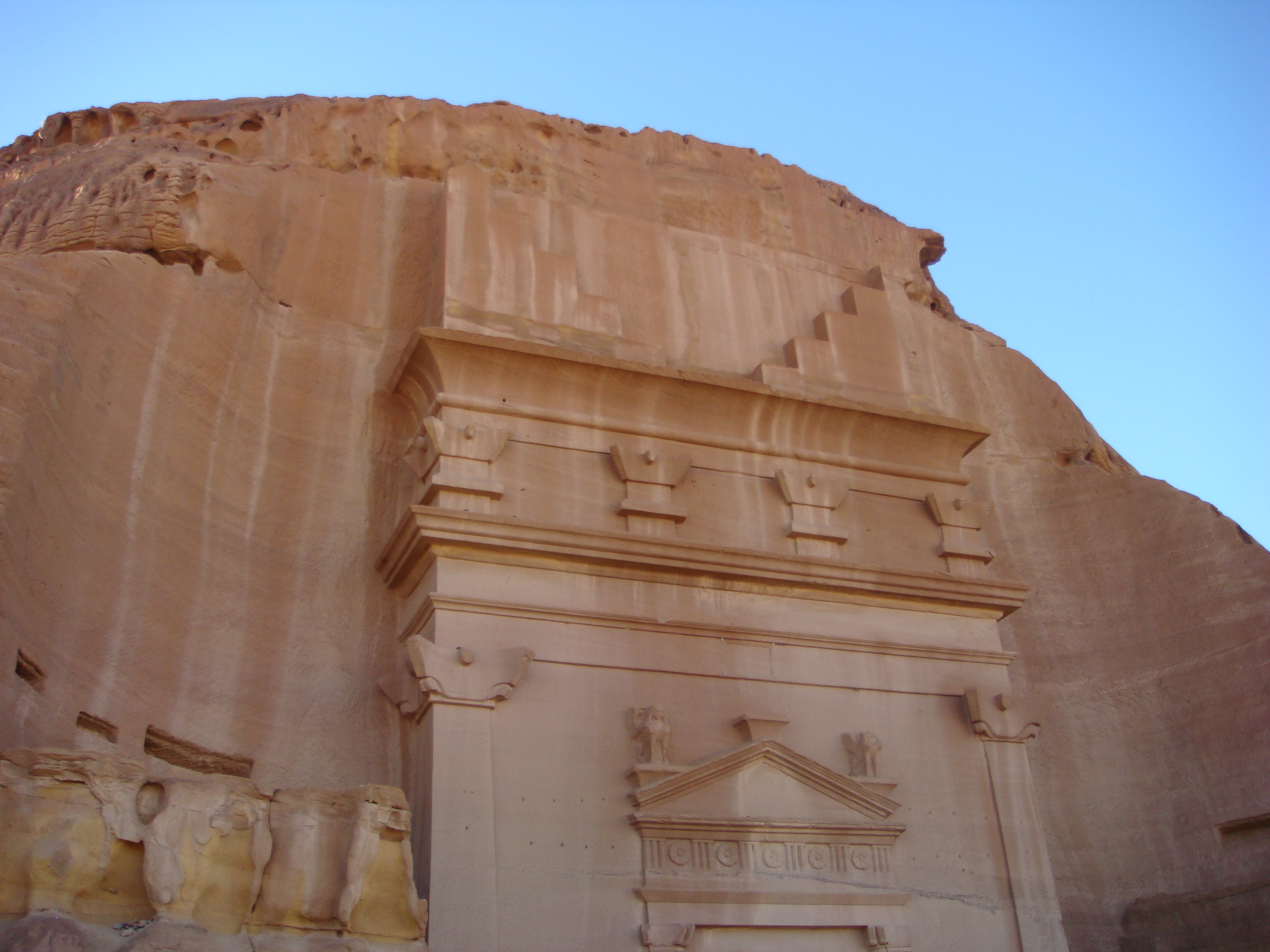
The Nabatean capital as it appears in the cities of Petra, Hegra and Bosra.

The Nabataean capital represents a distinctive architectural order, characterized by a markedly enlarged abacus and concave lateral profiles. This form is attested in several prominent Nabataean urban centers, including Petra, Bosra, Hegra (Mada'in Salih) and Si' (Seeia).

=== Significance ===
The significance of these paintings lies in their figurative elements, a subject that is often absent in preserved Nabataean painting and other media. While a small fragment of a human face was found during the excavations of the Great Temple and the excavation of the Temple of the Winged Lions brought to light other select fragments, the frescoes at the Painted Biclinium form both the most complete painted scene in the Nabataean archaeological record and the only one remaining in situ. The features of the figural composition, including the almond eyes and round chins, have parallels with other pieces of Hellenistic painting and mosaic, while the floral and faunal subjects are distinctly local. In addition, while the archaeological record pointing to Dionysiac worship appears prolific among the Nabataean elite, few contexts preserve any record of this practice outside of architecture and pottery. The Painted Biclinium, then, serves to provide a colorful flourish to our understanding of this religious tradition in the cultivated rich semi-arid landscape around Petra.

== Water management ==
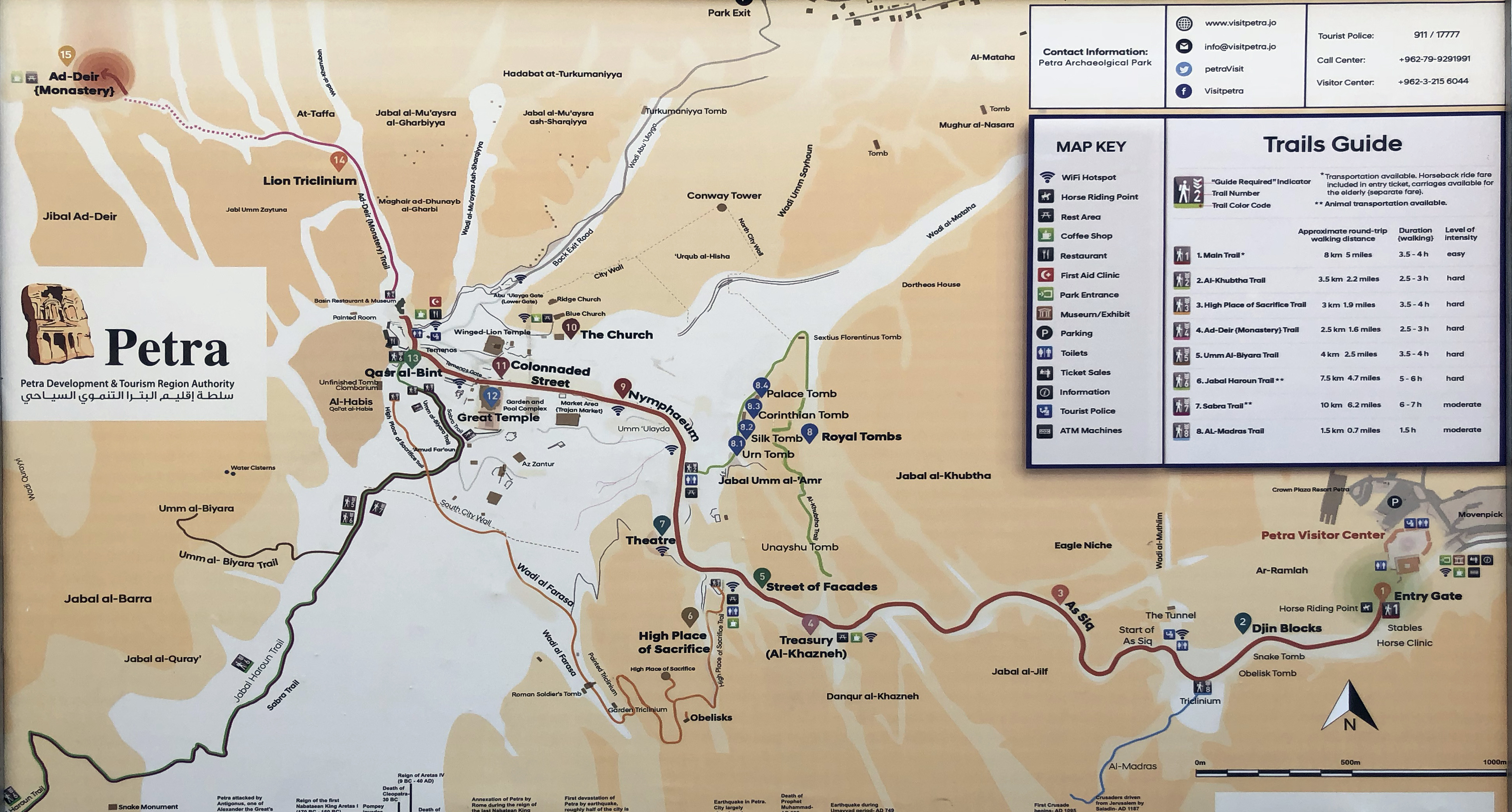
Map of Petra.

The engineering system of water supplies is the most important achievement of the Nabataean civilization in their capital, this made life possible in the dry region of the Jordanian desert. This system included methods of water conservation and dams that collected rainwater during the winter. The Nabateans also used a controlled system of canals and tubes of clay to distribute water throughout the city.

Excavations have demonstrated that it was the ability of the Nabataeans to control the water supply that led to the rise of the desert city, creating an artificial oasis. The area is visited by flash floods, but archaeological evidence shows that the Nabataeans controlled these floods by the use of dams, cisterns, and water conduits. These innovations stored water for prolonged periods of drought and enabled the city to prosper from its sale.

=== Hydrology and hydraulics ===
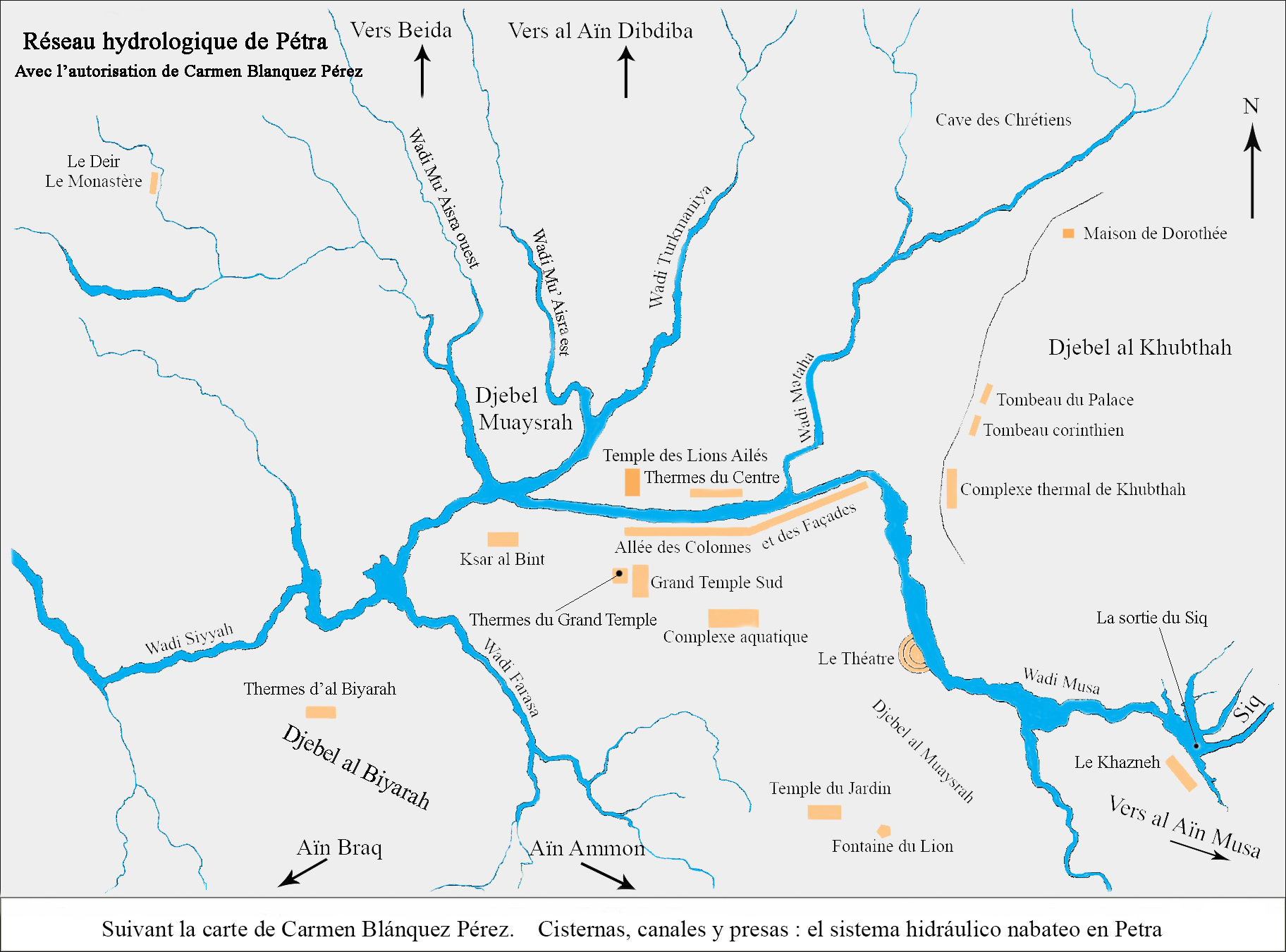
Map showing the hydraulic network of Petra.

Water, its hydrology and hydraulics were the main engines of the city of Petra; the city is built in a valley surrounded by mountains, crossed by the wadi Musa, a torrent flowing from east to west, which divides the city in two and constitutes its backbone. Strabo, a Greek geographer of the 1st century BC, indicates that the urban center in his journey to the East and to Petra: "...is situated as a whole in a flat and uniform terrain (...) protected in a circle by steep and abrupt rocks..."

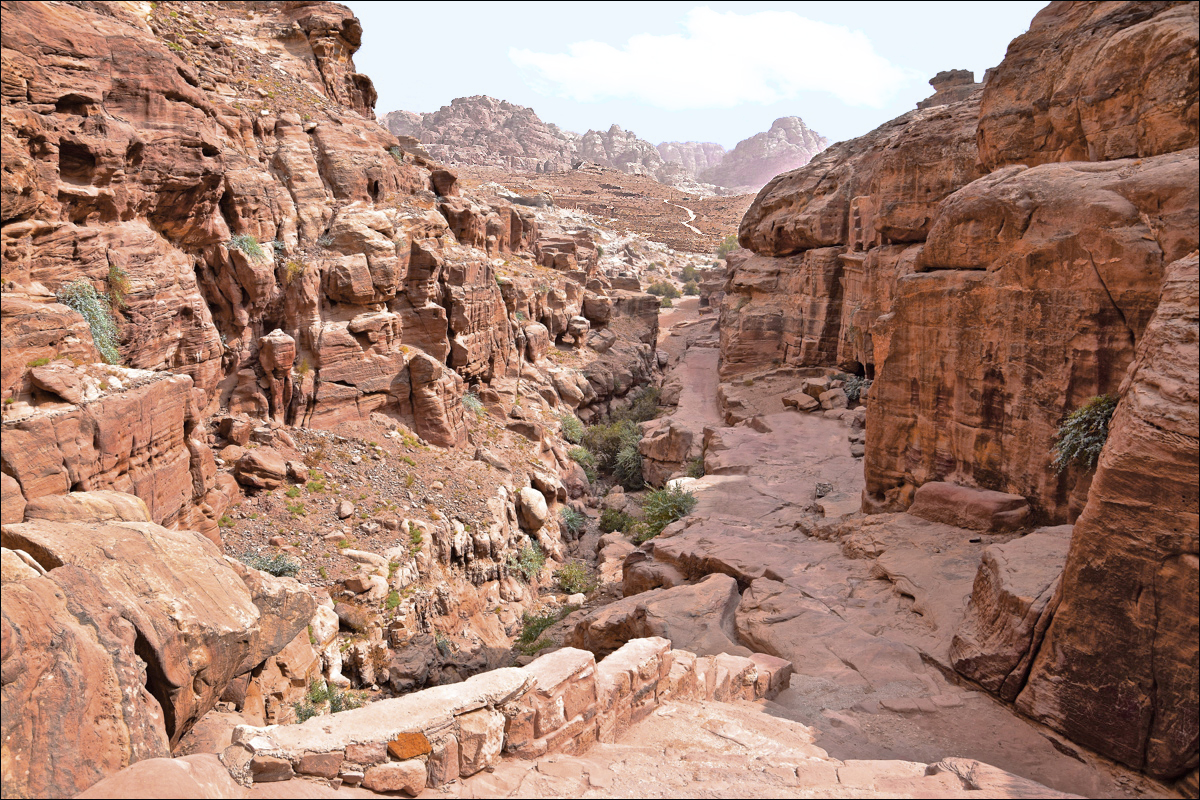
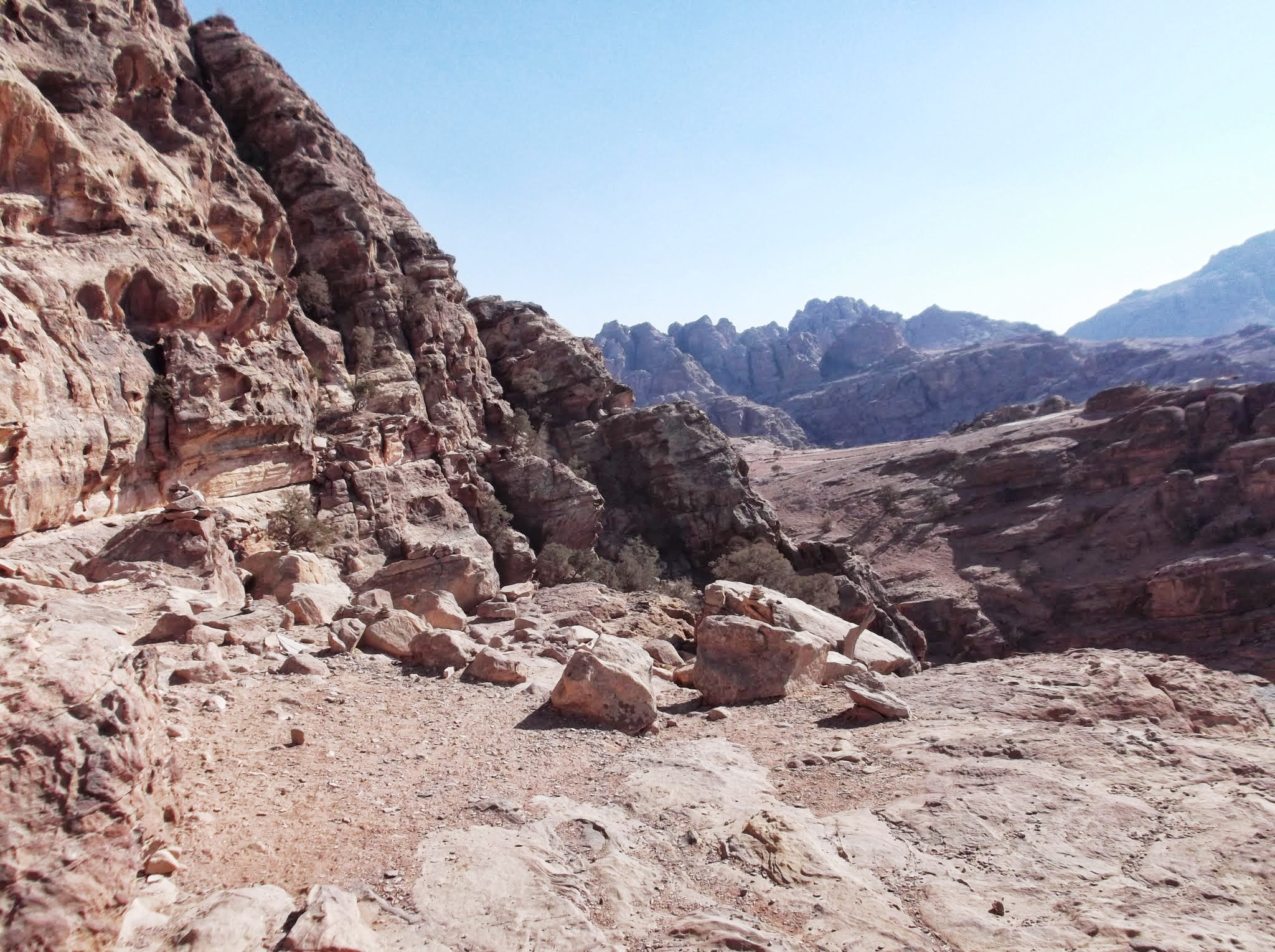
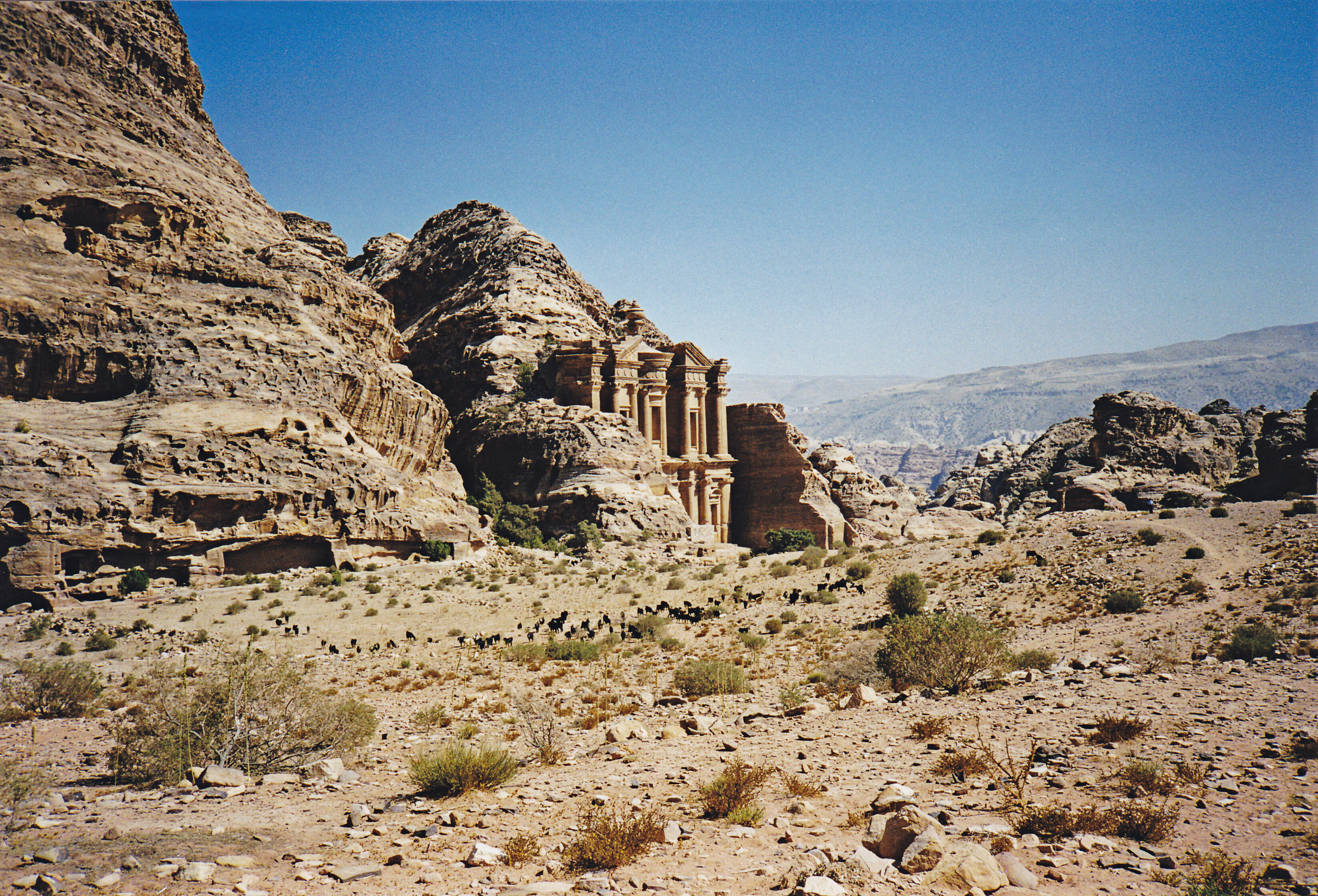
Photos of the trail leading to "Al-Deir" (اَلدَّيْر, the monastery).

Apart from a few springs, some of them low-flowing, the whole site of Petra is devoid of perennial water flows, not sufficient for the needs of a city that kept expanding for nearly a millennium. Charles Ortloff, an archaeologist from the University of Chicago, estimates that at its peak, the urban population of Petra reached 30,000. "...We must therefore appeal to human constructions so that life becomes possible in a natural environment where there is a lack of water on the surface..." . Petra receives significant quantities of rainwater for several months each year, which resulted in the construction of hydraulic installations to allow the capture of the rainwater, its storage and its distribution of in order to provide for the needs of the city.

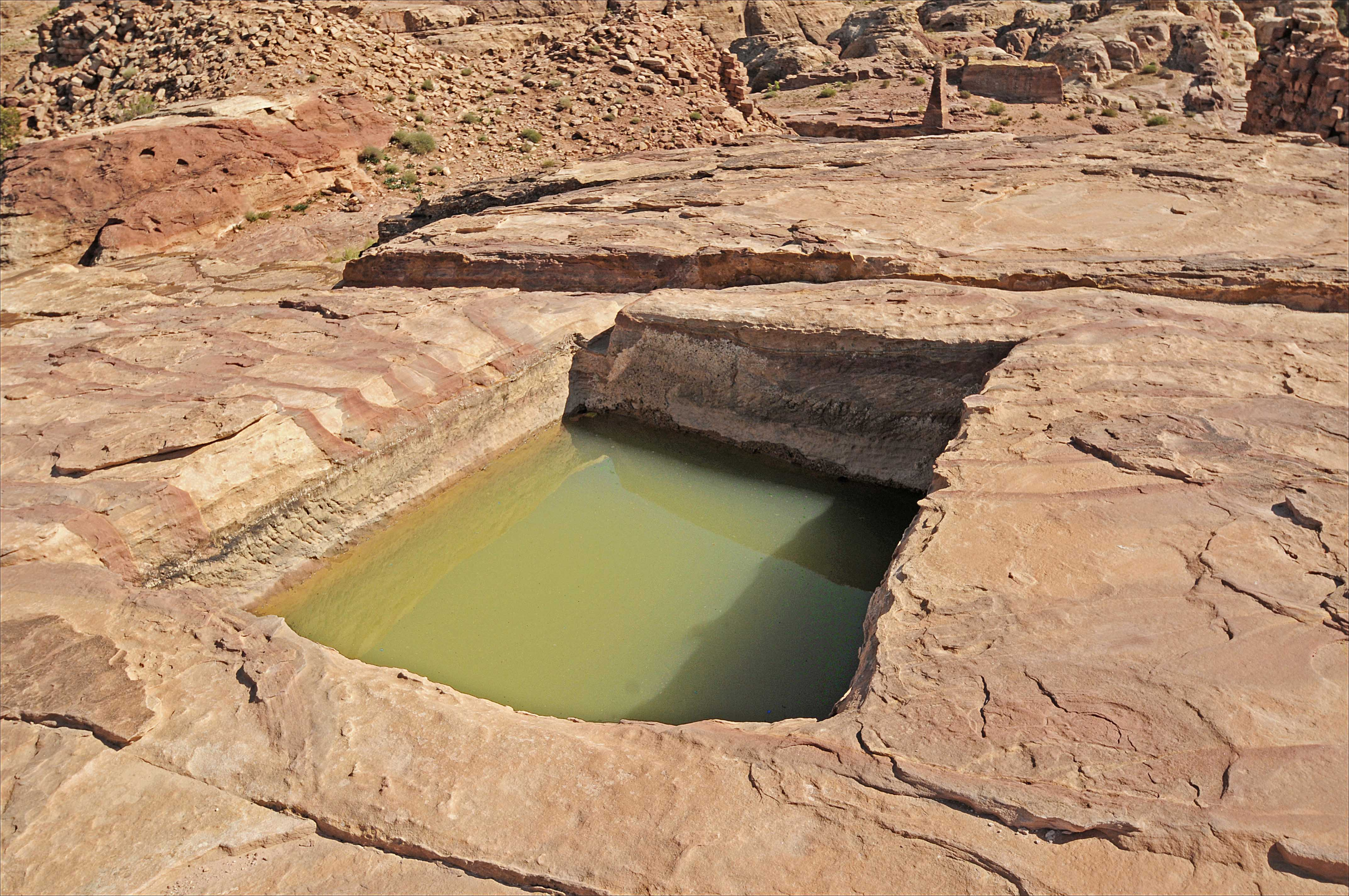
Water storage tank, dug in the rocky ground of the desert around Petra.

Several mountains, such as the Sharah mountains which rises to 1,550 m on the western part of the city, have several water sources such as - Aïn Musa, Aïn Debdebeh, Aïn Umm Sar'ab, Aïn Ammon, Aïn Beidha, Aïn Bebdbeh and Aïn Braq - whose waters are channeled to Petra. "...The solutions adopted, the methods and techniques employed, confirm that Nabataean hydraulic design could meet, if not exceed, the needs of Petra and were one of the main reasons for the prosperity of the city for centuries ..." Water was scarce in Petra, especially during the hot, dry season from June to September, when plants, animals and humans need it most. The first works, carried out with rudimentary tools, were generally small – cisterns, trenches, aqueducts – and carried out in the plains or in land with low resistance to digging. "...As soon as one finds a development of any size and regularity, canalization or built basin, one immediately sees the marks of orientalized Hellenism first, then of Rome and, later, that of Byzantium..."

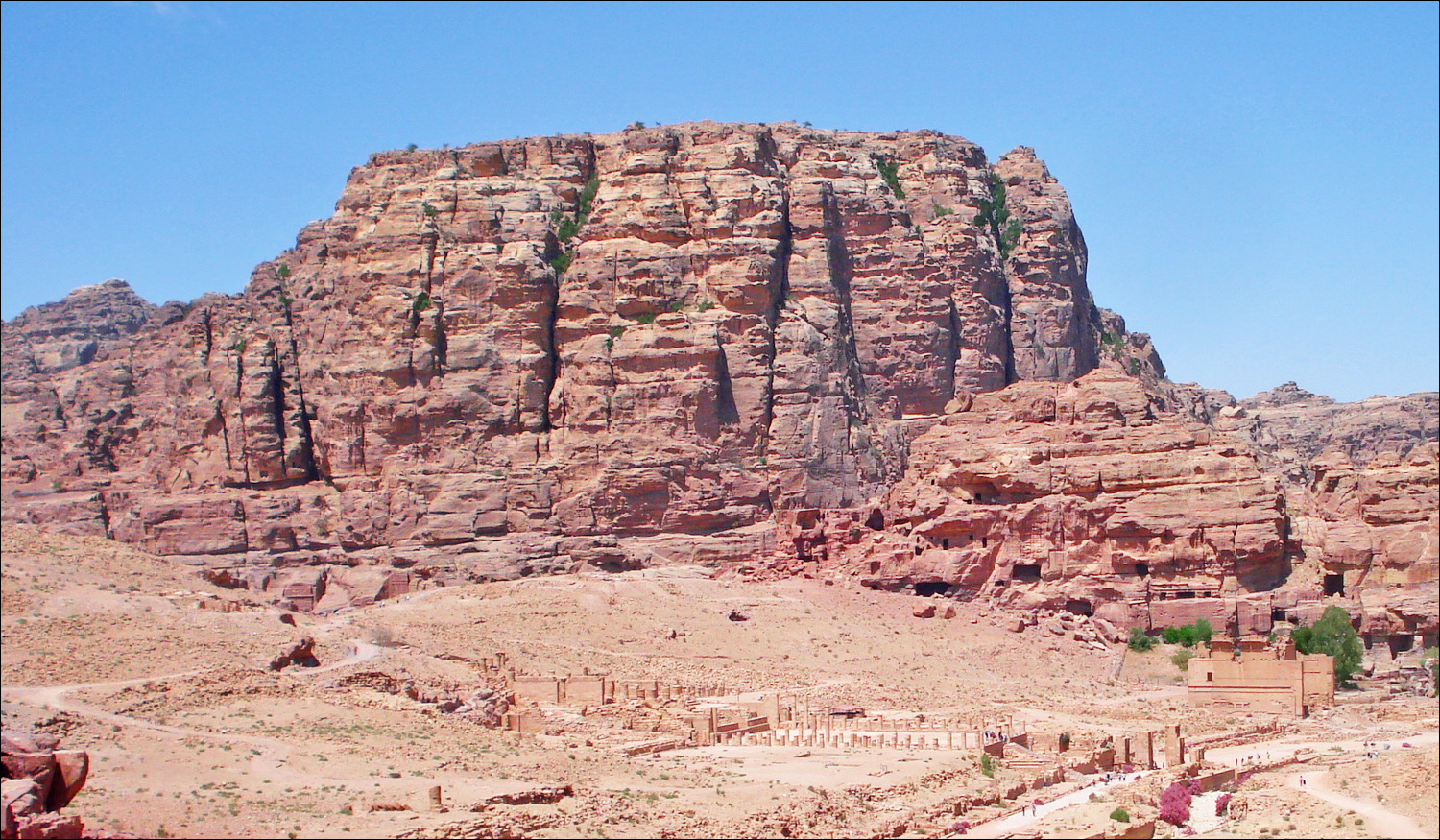
The mountain of Al Biyara - the mother of cisterns - with the center of Petra.

Strabo also spoke of waters from abundant springs: "...and the inner part of the city having springs in abundance, both for domestic needs and for watering the gardens...". To capture fresh water from the few available springs and to retain the torrential waters that flow from the mountains into the valley from November to April, the inhabitants have erected structures there over the centuries for the capture, storage and distribution of these waters coming from the sky or underground. One can also find several arches supporting narrow aqueducts to pass from one cliff to another, without changing level, and qanats dug in the depths of the mountain.

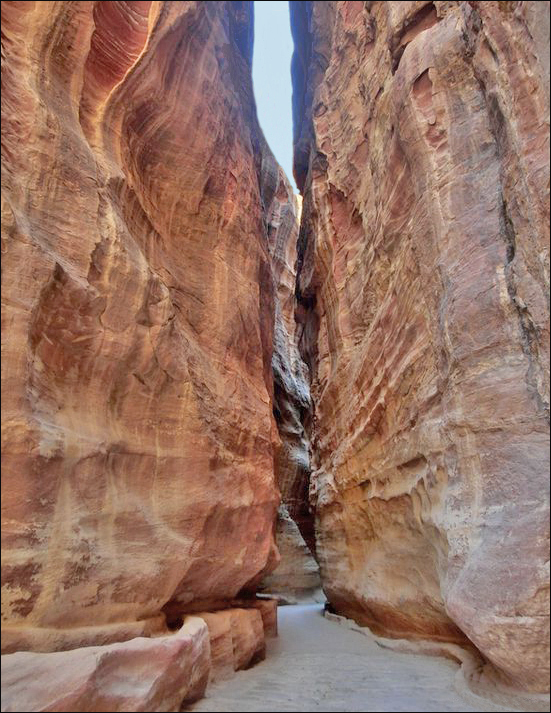
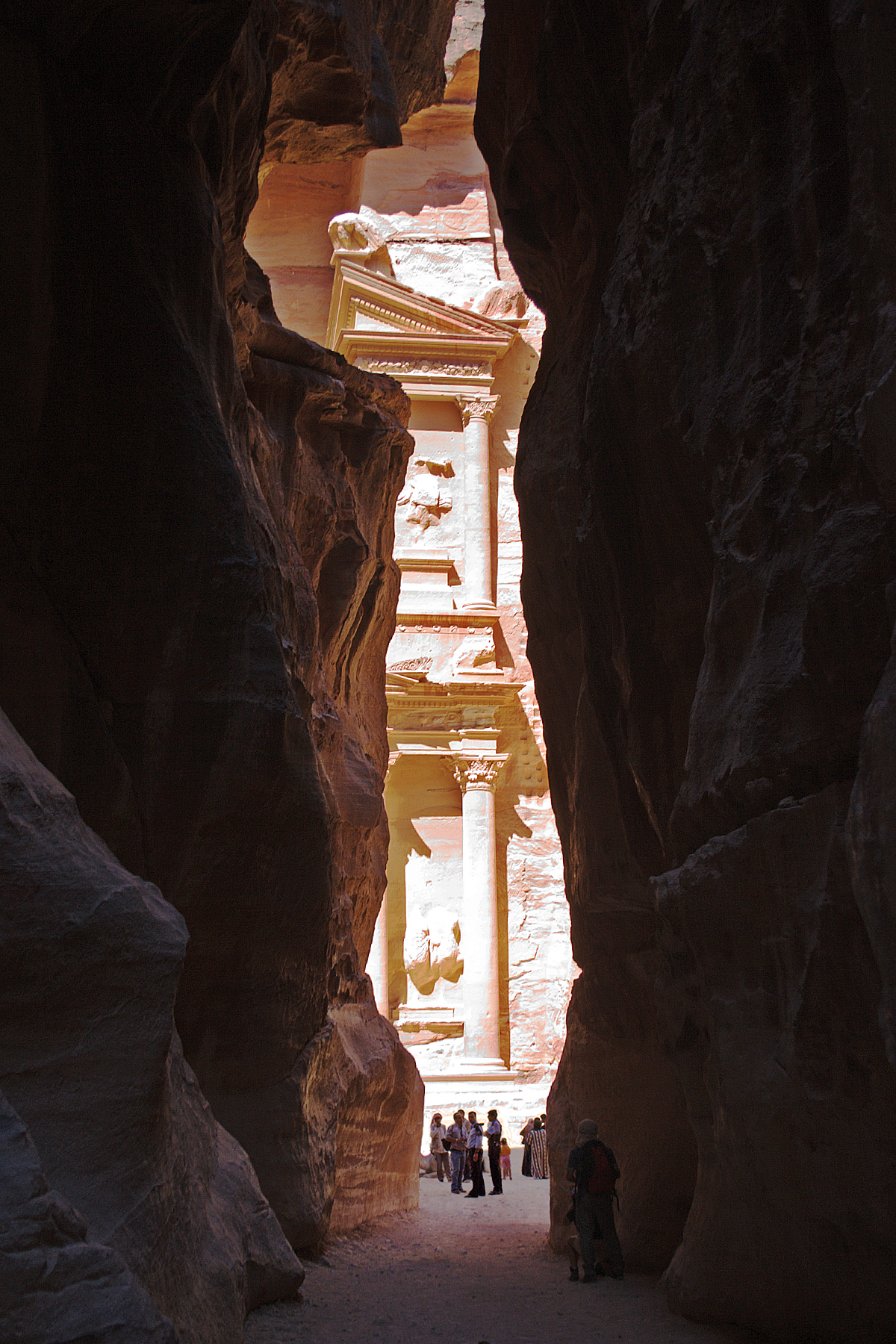
The "Siq" in its south-north passage, with several channels dug on each side of the rock fault (left) and "the Treasury", as seen from as-Siq, right before the passage ends (right).

“...Umm al-Biyara, [ Arabic: أم البيارة, the mother of cisterns], is a vast rocky area that dominates the city to the west. The numerous traces of cisterns dug in sandstone or limestone, attributed to the Edomites, from the middle of the first millennium BC and probably earlier, generally have the shape of bottles, a narrow neck for the opening, an enlargement in the depth then...” For the capture of the water, its filtration and storage, its transport sometimes over long distances, the Arab Nabatean hydraulicians and plumbers of Petra were inspired by techniques already used a few millennia earlier, in the cities of the Indus Valley. - Mohenjo Daro, Harappa, and those of Jerusalem, or for the supply of the Palace of Knossos in the island of Crete. However the geographical and hydrological conditions of the city, forced them to rethink new hydraulic techniques, more appropriate to the needs of the populations of Petra such as the permanent resident populations or simply the caravanners, Myrrh traders and travellers.

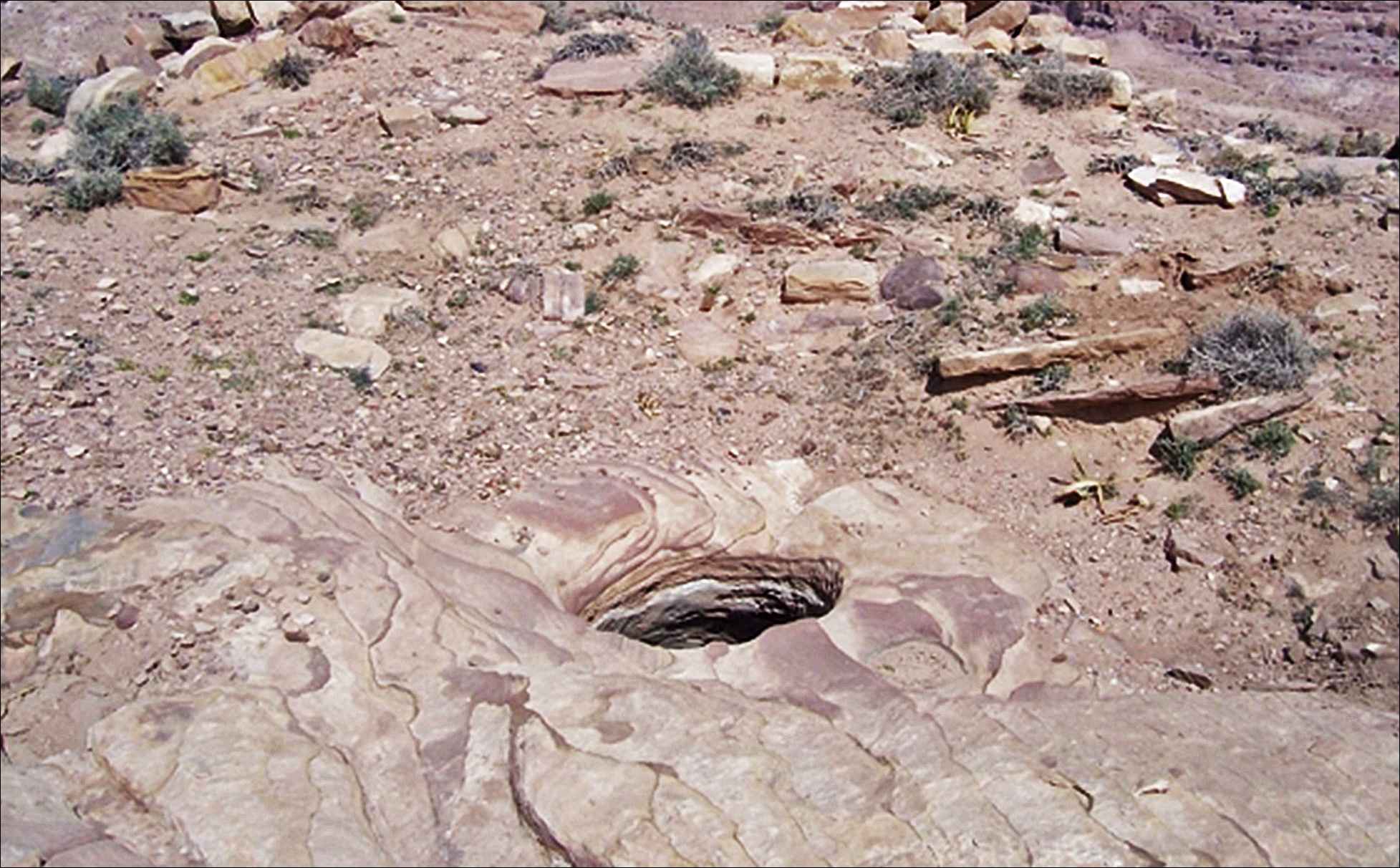
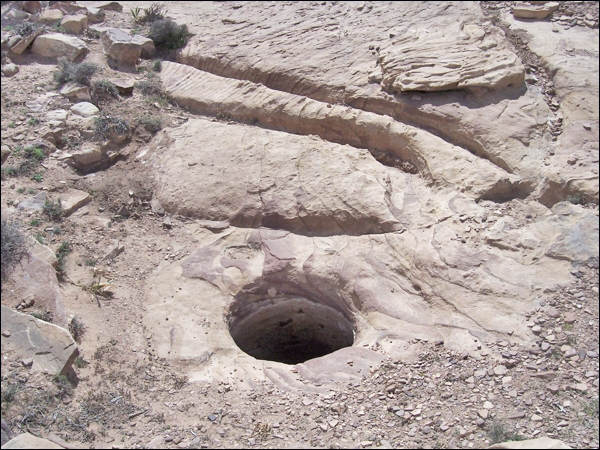
Two cisterns constructed by the Nabatean Arabs.

"...Technical means to capture and store a fraction of rain runoff through dams and cisterns, such as the construction of flood control systems, pipes and canals to bring water from distant sources and managing these resources for the continued supply of water to the city, is crucial to understanding Nabataean contributions to hydraulic science [...]. While water storage was one of the keys to the survival of the city, a number of sources internal and external to the city […] Ain Mousa, Ain Umm Sar'ab, etc., provide water which was channeled towards the city [...] This constituted the main source of water supply for the urban center...”

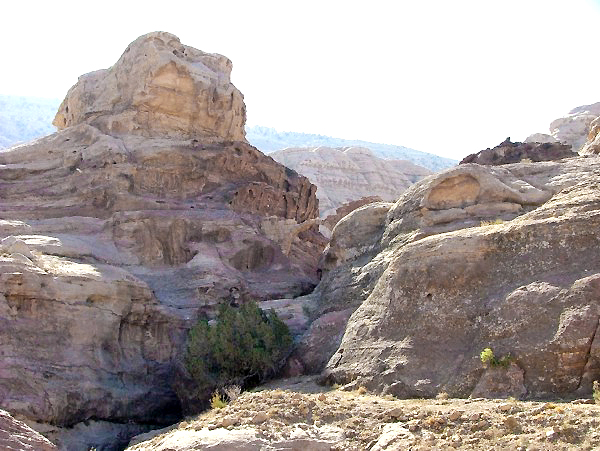
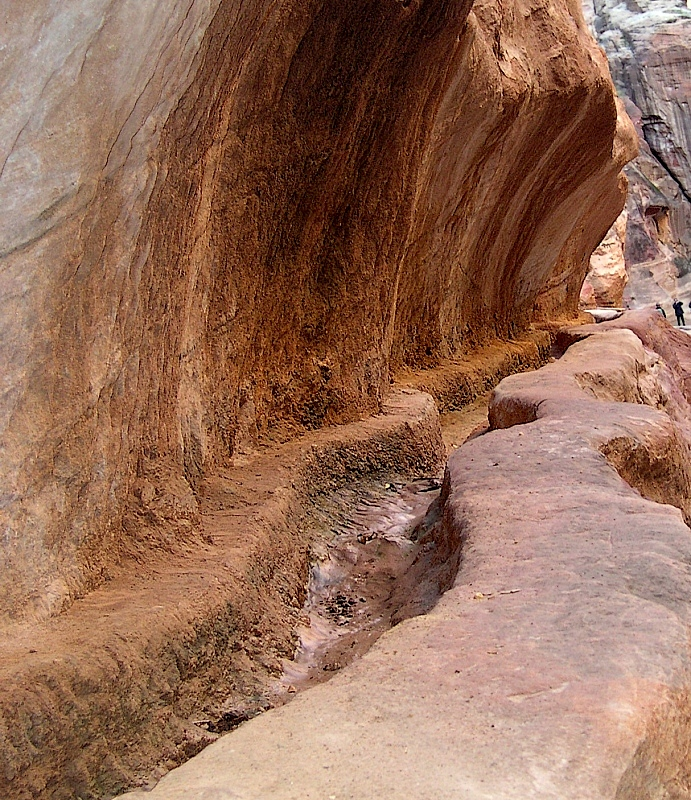
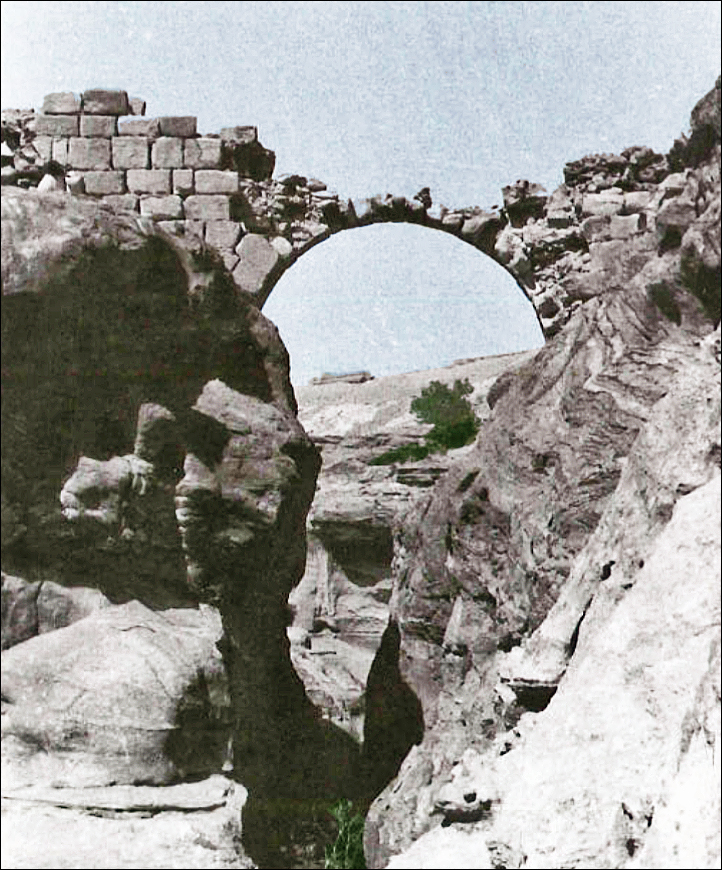
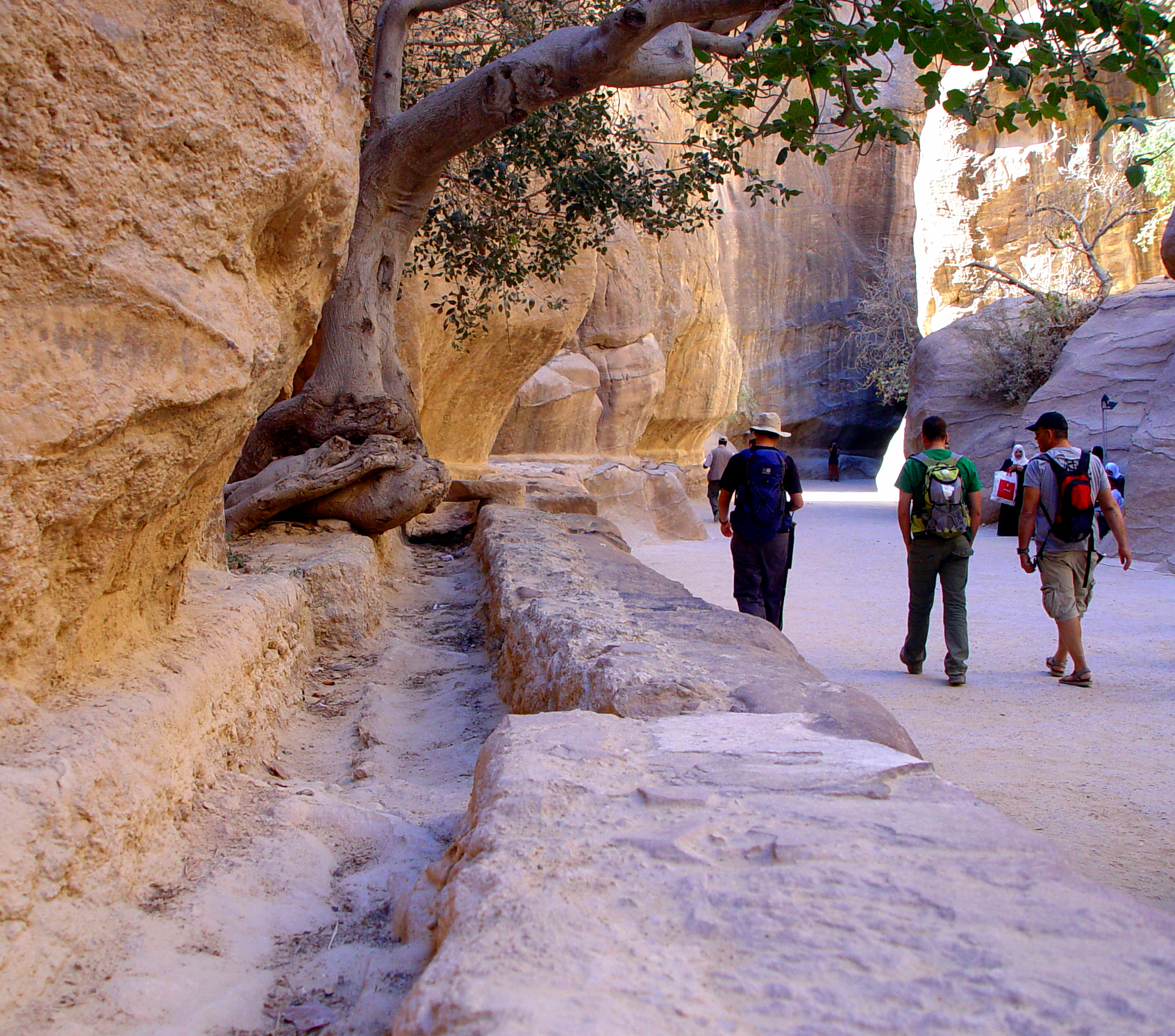
Various examples of Nabatean aqueducts.

Charles R. Ortloff was able to reconstruct the plan of the hydraulic network of ancient Petra and count a set of 8 water sources, 40 dams and water reservoirs, more than 200 reservoirs and cisterns, with a set of pipes exceeding 200 km. This does not include the water reservoirs on the side of the mountains, with the construction of stone walls for the construction of terraces for crops. This Arabic principle of traditional water capture is the oldest system, both for capturing and storing rainwater for agricultural purposes.

=== Water capture ===
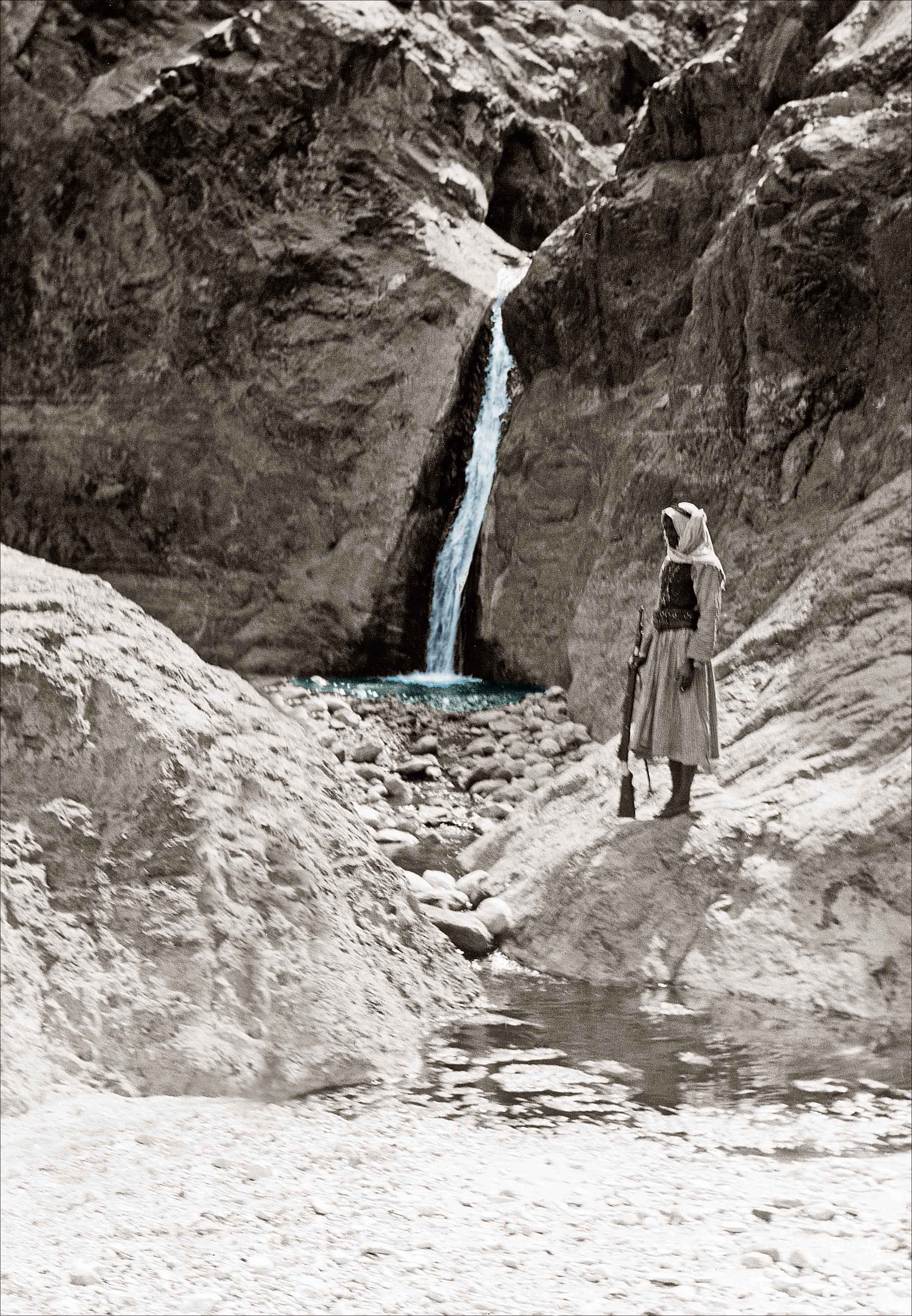
A waterfall on Wadi Siyyagh around 1900.

Water capture was the start of any Nabatean hydraulic distribution system; entire sectors of the region of Petra were deprived of springs, in the early period of the Nabataean settlements, the main supply of spring water came from a wide stone channel placed on the ground coming from the source of 'Ain Moussa (lit: source of Moses), located 7 km east of Petra, taking the waters of the source of Ain Umm Sar'ab and bringing the water to the Siq which crossed Petra. Subsequently, depending on the needs of the city, other sources were directed to the center of Petra: Ain Braq, Ain Dibdiba, Ain Ammon, al Beidha, Ain Bebdbeh.

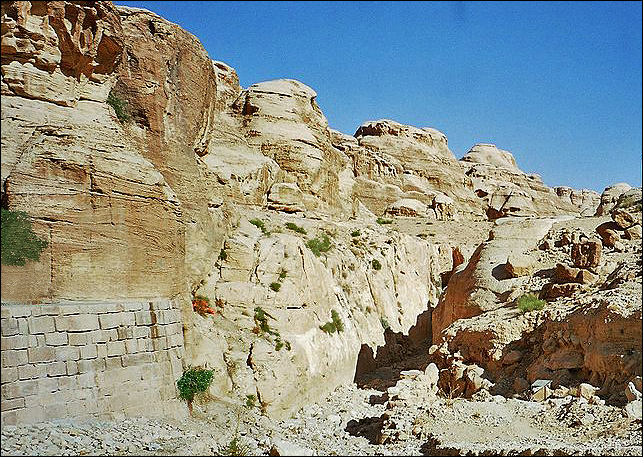
Ancient dam at the entrance of the Siq, with deviation towards the tunnel.

Rainwater harvesting was generally done by cofferdams or dams in the lower part of the wadis, or torrents descending from the surrounding mountains. This collection system allowed the retention and regulation of water during torrential rains, which tumbled down the mountains and destroyed crops and structures in the valleys. These dams or reservoirs increased the irrigated areas and therefore the cultivable areas after the deposit of silt, a technique perhaps copied in the Nile Valley.

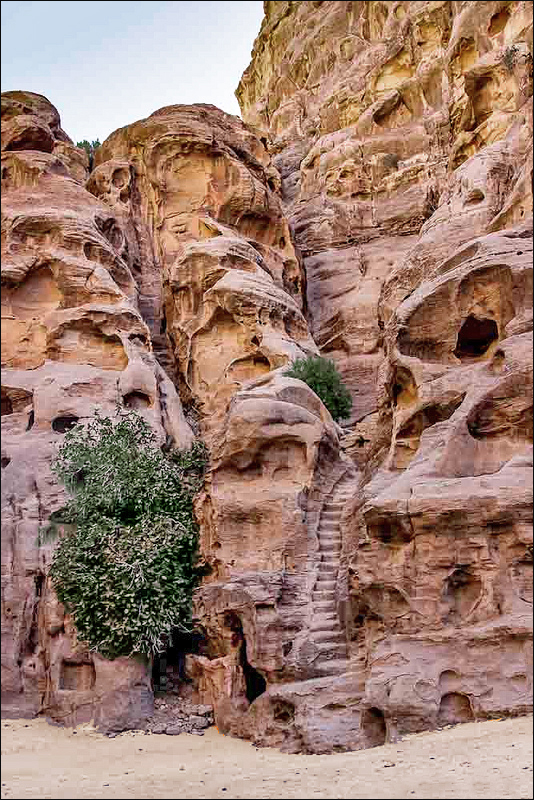
Mountain filled with holes dug by water, Petra.

"...This technique consists of having the field built by the alluvial deposits of flowing water, then using the field to absorb the water retained behind small dikes..." A little before the entry into the Siq, a Nabatean structure under the mountain, of an 80 m diversion tunnel, is found, this structure which directed the waters of wadi Mousa towards wadi Muhlima, made it possible to reduce the risk of flooding in the center of Petra, whose waters previously passed directly through the Siq. The capture of water from the mountains was also done by gutters or channels dug in the middle or in the lower part of the slope, which then made it possible to lead this water to reservoirs or cisterns, both of which were used for the storage of water, but also for its decantation, in order to eliminate solid particles.

=== Decantation ===
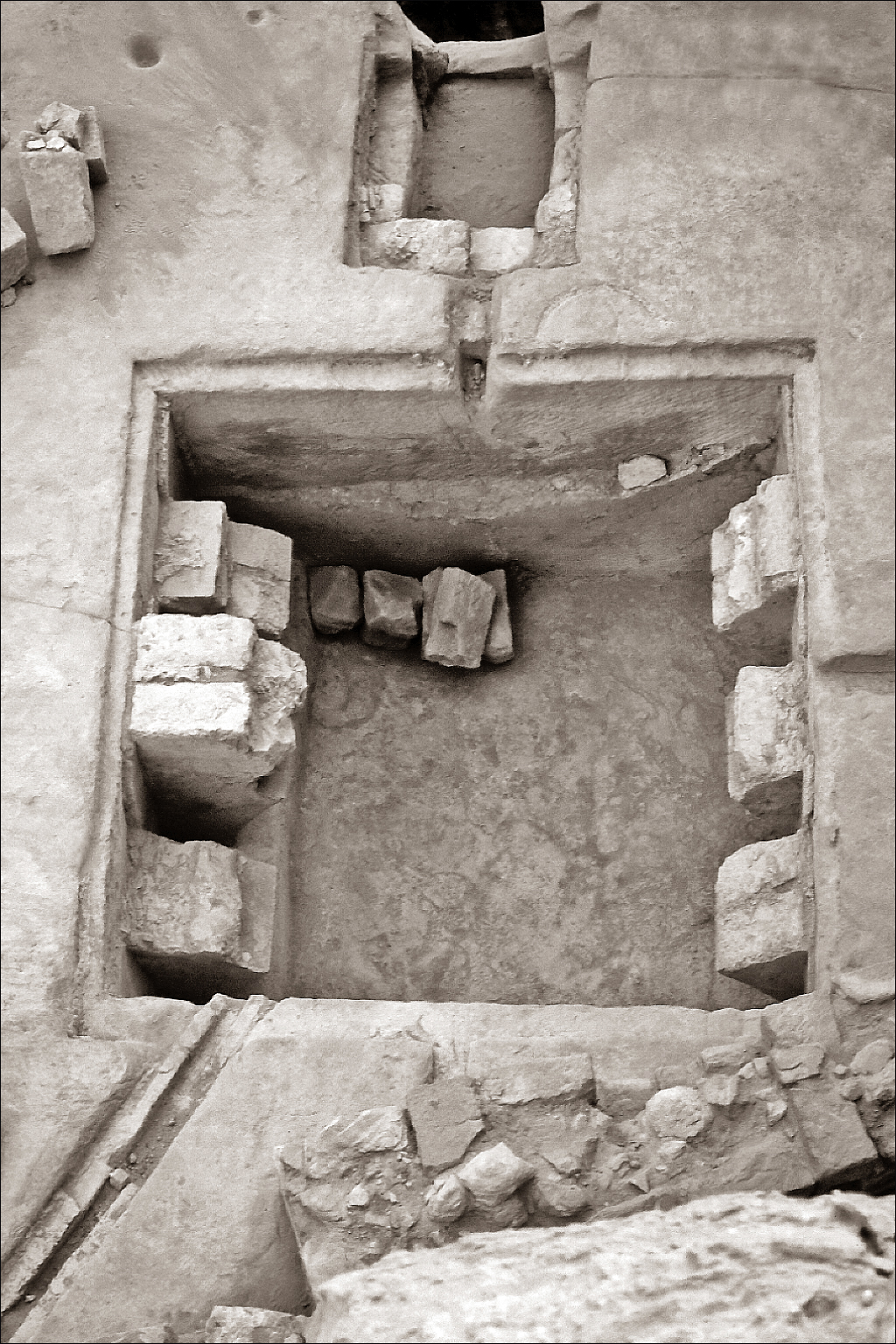
The castellum divisorium on the wadi Farasah, used for decantation and the redistribution of water.

The decantation of the water after its capture was the responsibility of the inhabitants responsible for the city's water management, including the "Master of the Water", this was done in order to preserve its clarity and drinkability, as well as to limit excessive evaporation over time, but also to regulate its use according to the city's needs. This technique was also used in even older cities such as Mohenjo Daro, Knossos, Harapa, etc. The purification of water was done by passing the water after its capture in one or more consecutive basins. This process greatly reduced the speed of the water and facilitated the descent of heavy particles to the bottom of the reservoir, in order to be subsequently removed. This simple filtration system allowed better conservation of water for domestic needs, especially in the case of buried storage tanks; it avoided solid deposits in pipes and gutters.

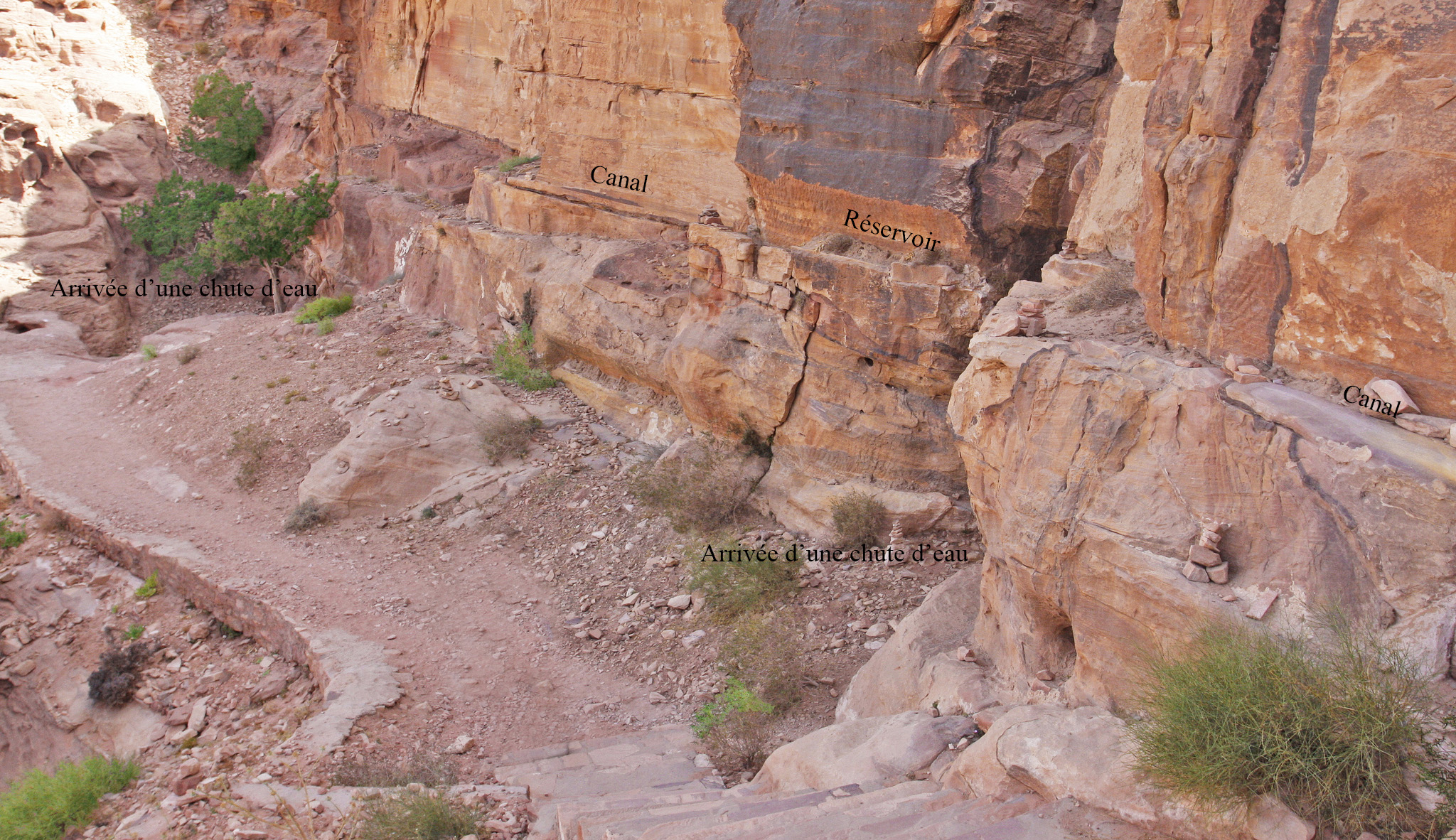
Canals and reservoirs dug in the lower part of the mountain.

Each cistern and reservoir generally had a settling pit attached to its water inlet and a low wall at the inlet to the reservoir which allowed the speed of the water to be slowed down to facilitate the deposit of particles heavier than water, but also to avoid stirring up the deposits in the bottom of the pit and increasing the turbidity of the water. The volume of the cistern does not always reflect the volume of water available; at the end of the dry season, the water at the bottom of the cisterns was unfit for consumption, it stagnated there for several months and some cisterns were only partially or never cleaned.

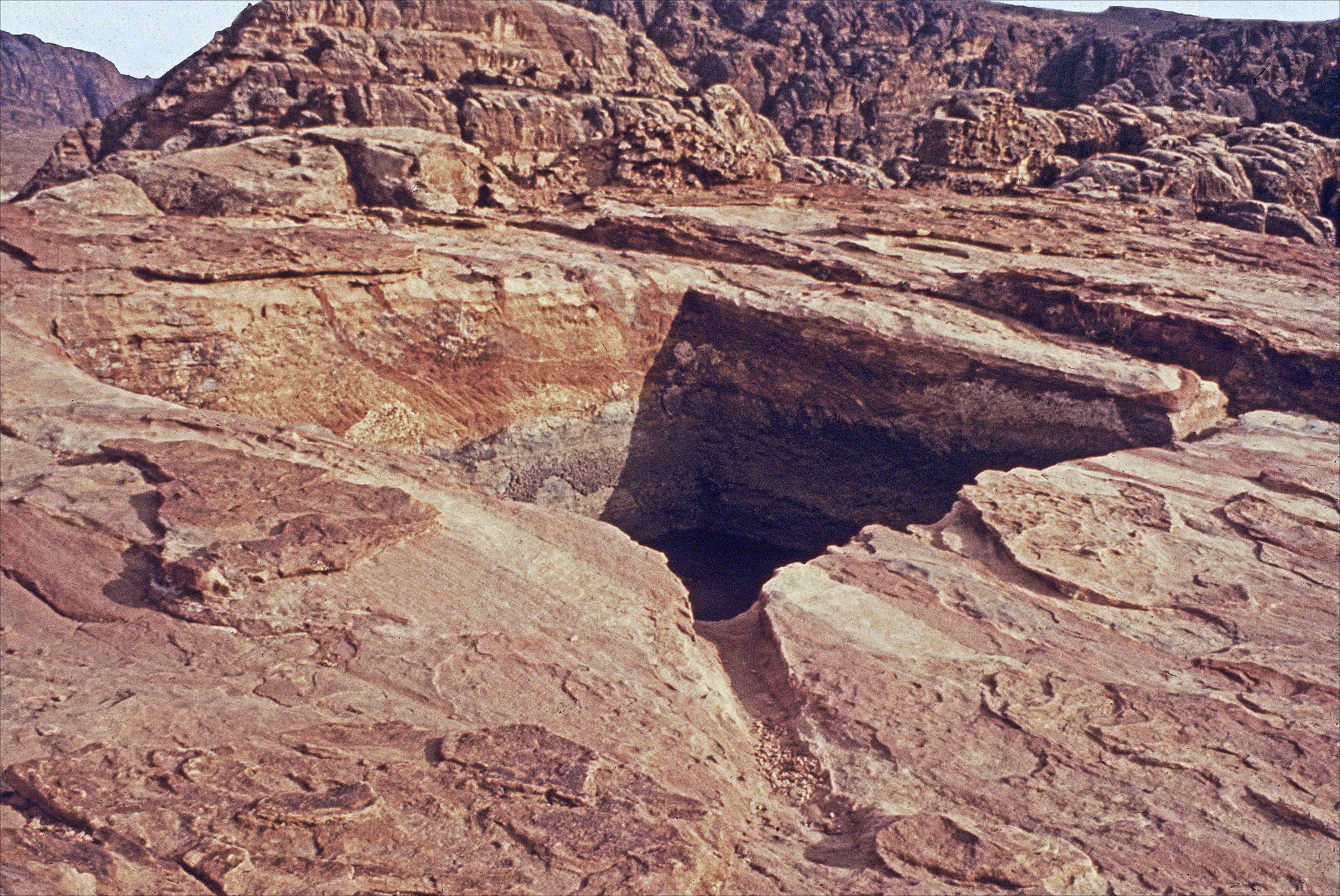
Reservoir dug in the rocky desert with the water supply channels.

=== Water storage ===
Water storage was an essential element for the development and survival of the city, as it allowed to have a sufficient volume of water throughout the year. Hundreds of buried cisterns and open reservoirs have been built on the site of Petra since its occupation by the Edomites. These storages were dug into the rock of the mountain or built on the ground. The interior walls of these cisterns and reservoirs were left as they were or coated with waterproof mortar, depending on the nature and porosity of the rock. Cisterns and reservoirs have varying dimensions and are adapted to the ground on which they are dug or built. One of the tanks is 32 m long by 2 m wide and 3 m deep; some reservoirs can have a capacity of up to 2,500 m^{3}. Several successive cisterns can be connected to each other by their overflow, both to allow a more efficient form of decantation, but also to increase water storage in the case of a high concentration of habitat.

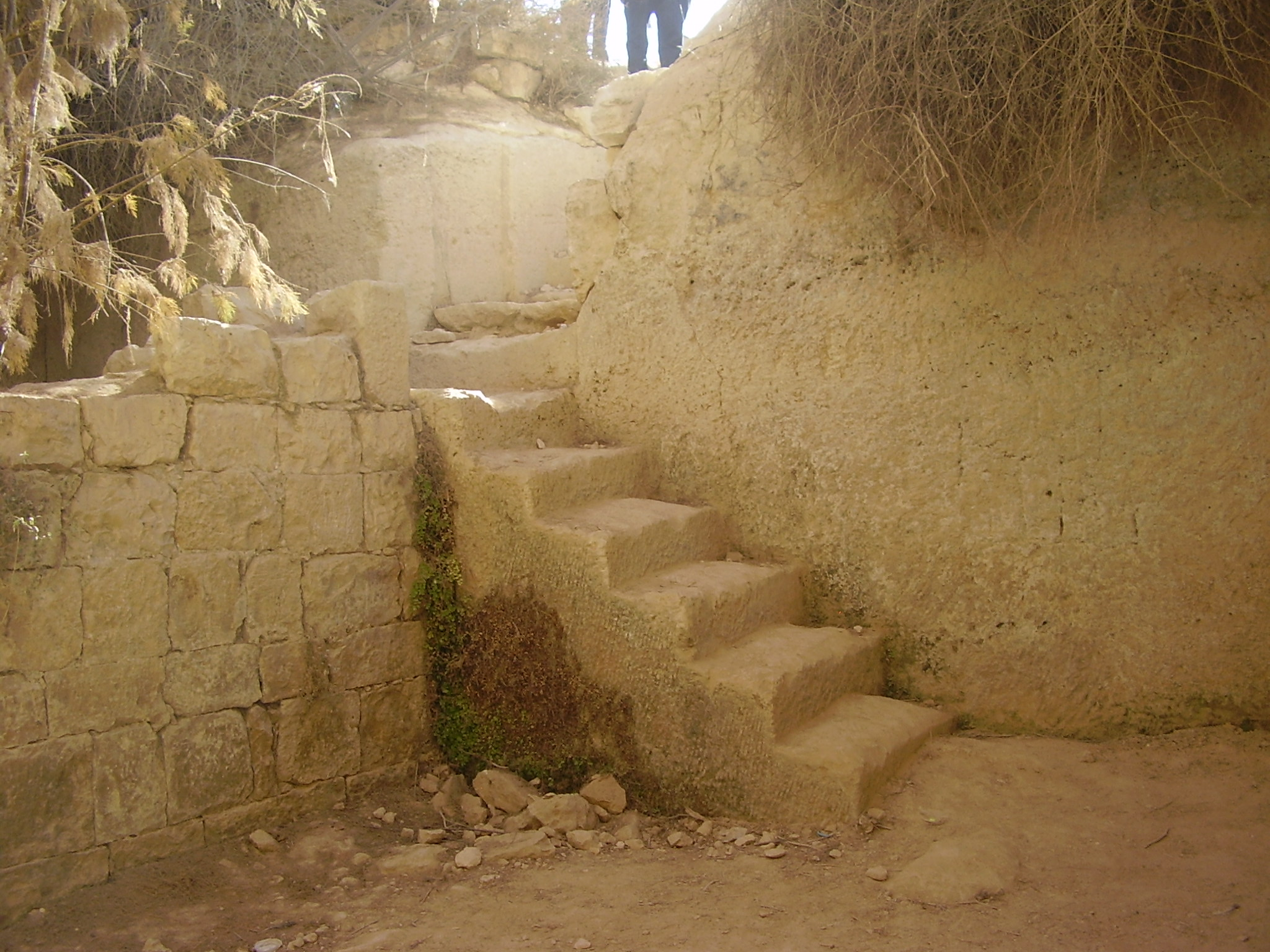
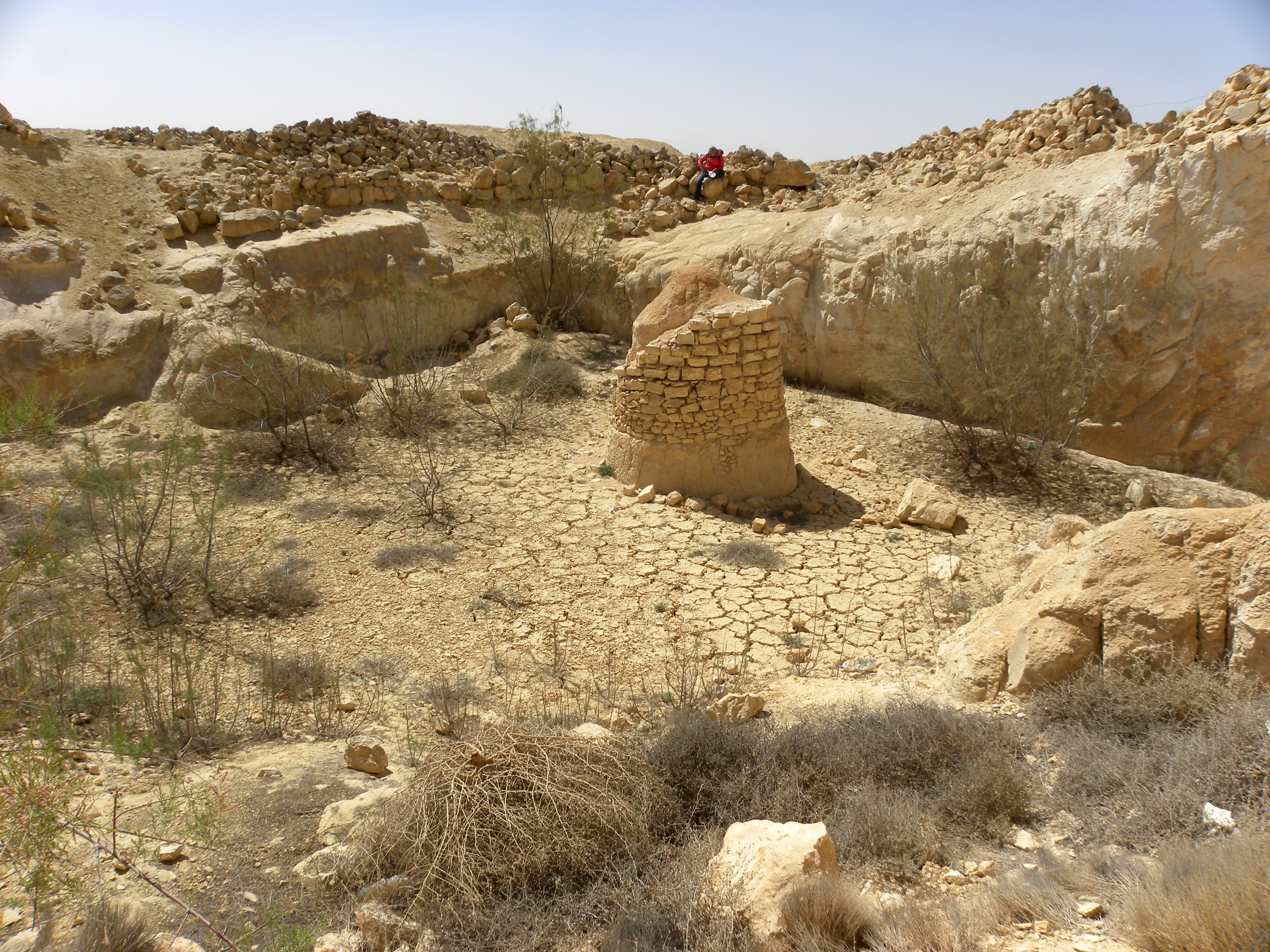
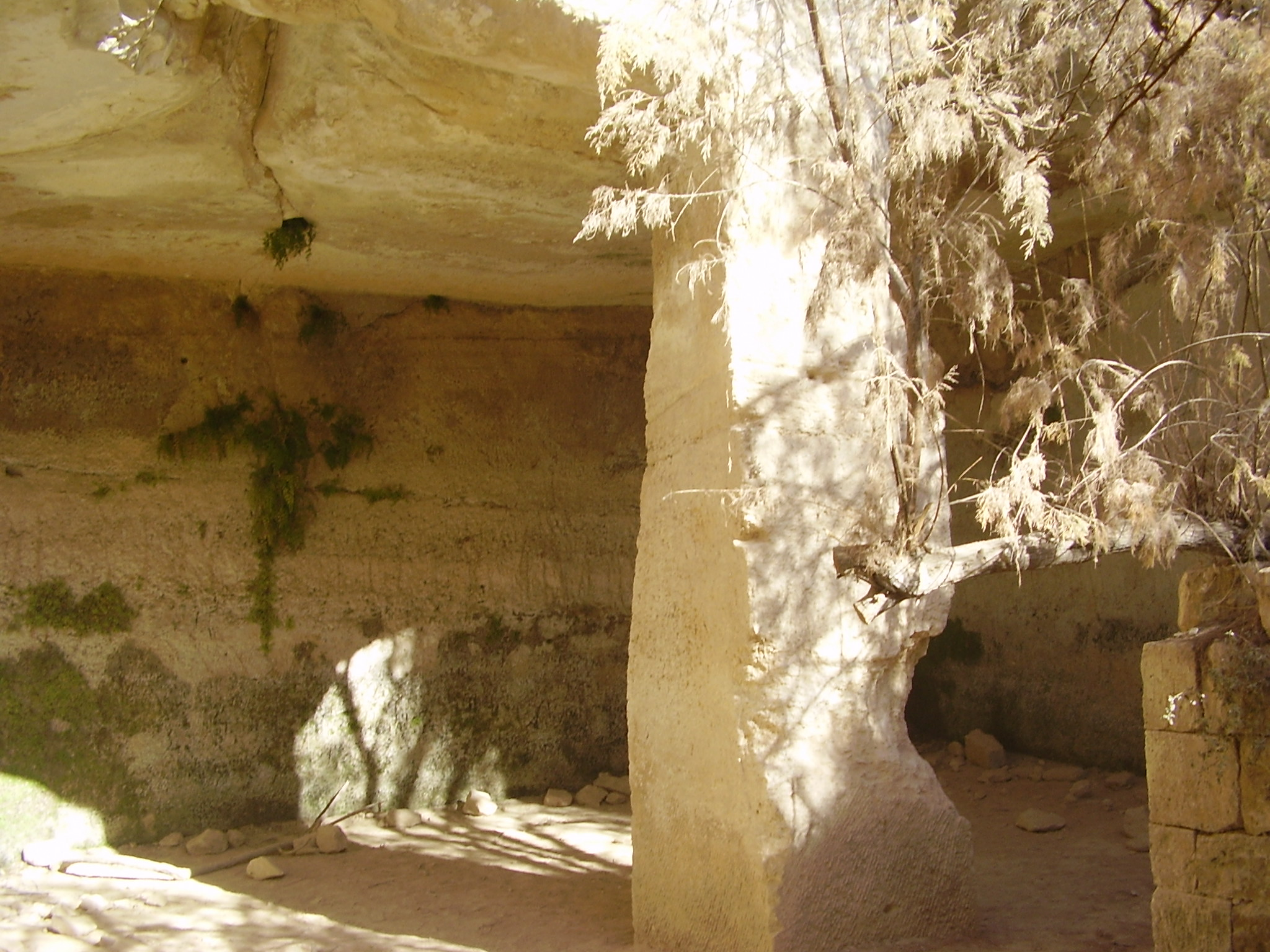
Ancient Nabatean Arab wells and cisterns in Naqab, Levant.

During the prehistoric period and the occupation of Petra by nomadic tribes, the Nabataens knew the location of these buried cisterns used to store water. But these bottle-shaped cisterns with narrow entrances could also serve as a defense system and refuge in case of necessity. Diodorus of Sicily, a 1st-century-BC ancient Greek historian, talked in his writings about the Nabateans facing an enemy, a description which corresponds quite well to the current knowledge that academics have on the buried cisterns around Petra: "...they fled into the desert which serves them of a fortress: the lack of water makes it inaccessible to others, but for them alone who have dug reservoirs in the earth covered with a lime plaster, it is a safe haven. [...] After having filled these reservoirs with rainwater, they plug the openings and level the ground around them, leaving signs known to them, but imperceptible to others..."

=== Water distribution ===
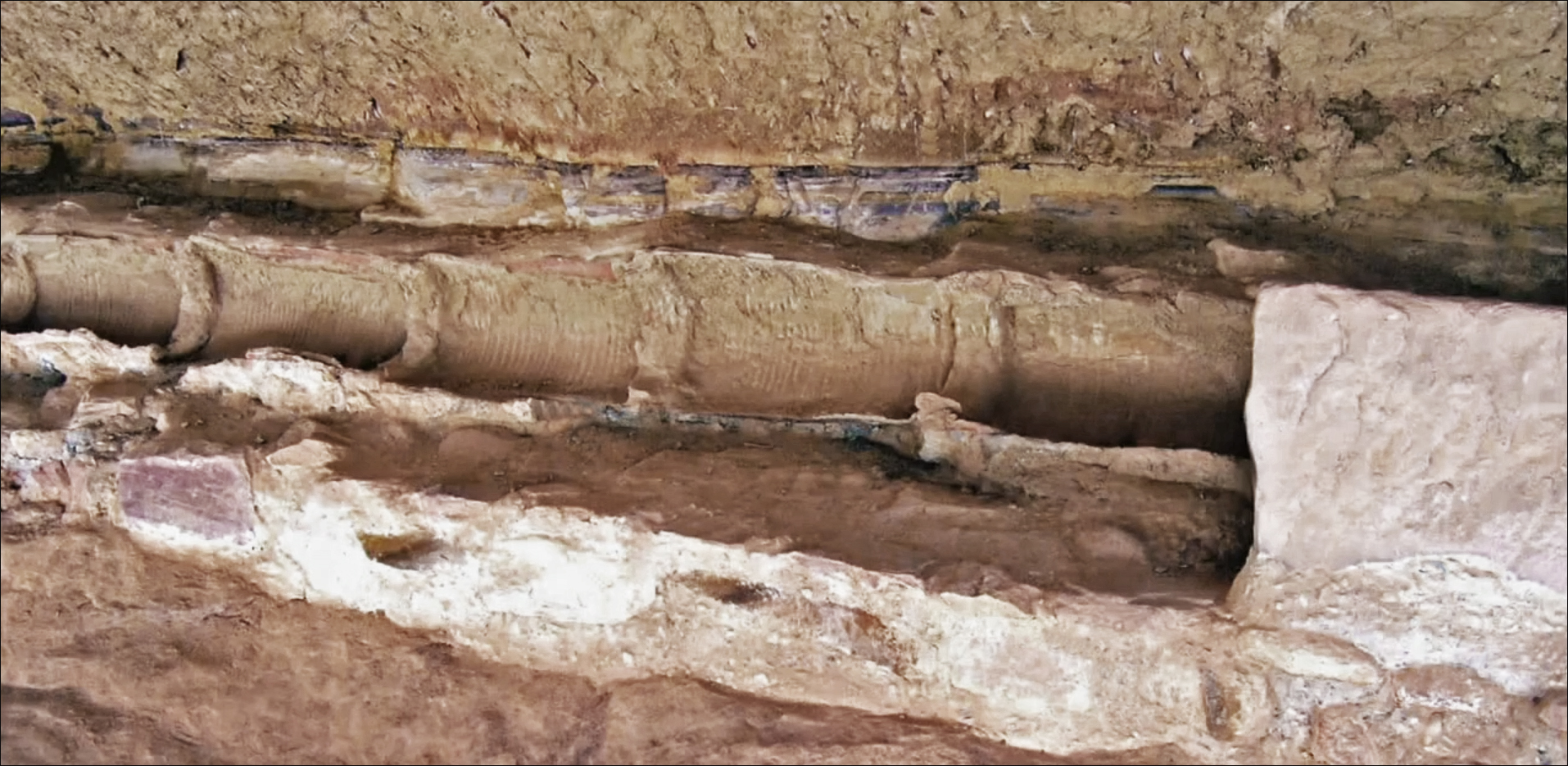
Nabatean terracotta piping placed in a channel with stone protection on the right.

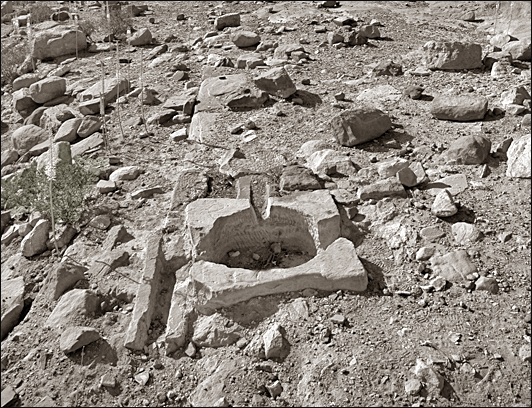
Water collection and distribution reservoir on Wadi Farasah.

The distribution of water in Petra had a varying morphology and used several techniques, some simple and others more elaborate. Recent research indicates a total volume for all the systems in Petra of 40,000 m^{3} of water transported daily by all the hydraulic networks of the Nabataean city.

Many canals were dug on the mountain-side from springs, sometimes very far away from the inhabitants. The water source of Aïn Mousa is 7 km away from the center of the city. In order to recover water from these sometimes distant springs, work for the construction and maintenance of these canals and channels on the side of the mountains required both rigorous design and construction by workers whose experience exceeded the skills of the average nomad, Nabatean professionals were trained in these techniques in the other regions of the Near East.

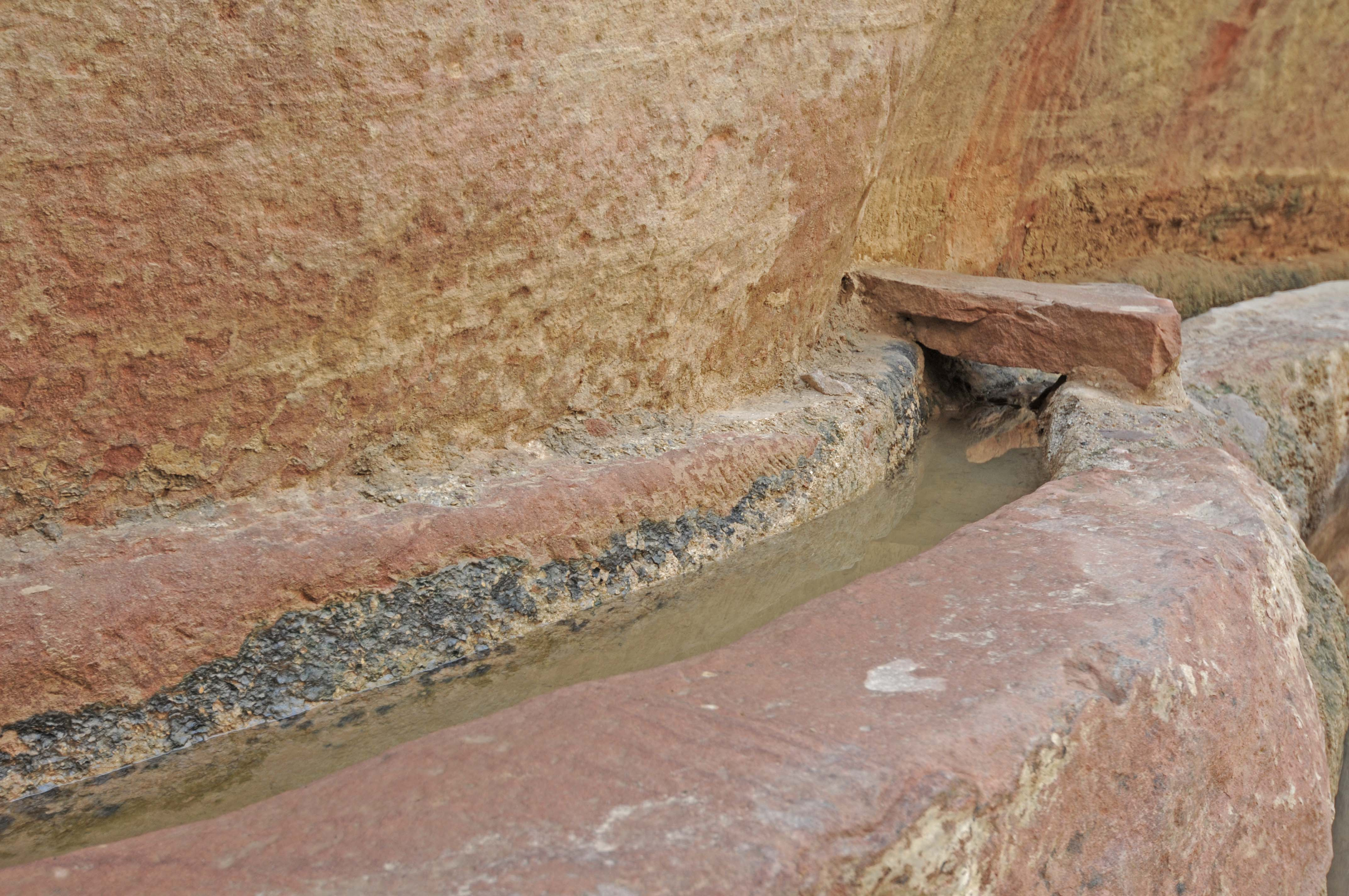
Canal with the principle of protection by an old cover stone.

Several canals were made of stone cut from blocks of local marl or limestone. With a length of 60 to 90 cm, this type of canal has been used since the 1st century BC, until the Byzantine period. The so-called gravity system was most often used, the networks of pressurized pipes - ceramic pipes - were little used for the transportation of water to the city of Petra. The slope of the channel was constructed for an optimal flow and according to its course, the channel was in the open air or covered with flat stones. In the case of too steep slopes, and in order to avoid overflow and water losses, wells were built along the course in order to "break" the speed of the water, but also to allow the settling of the particles of sand and stone that could be carried away by the current.

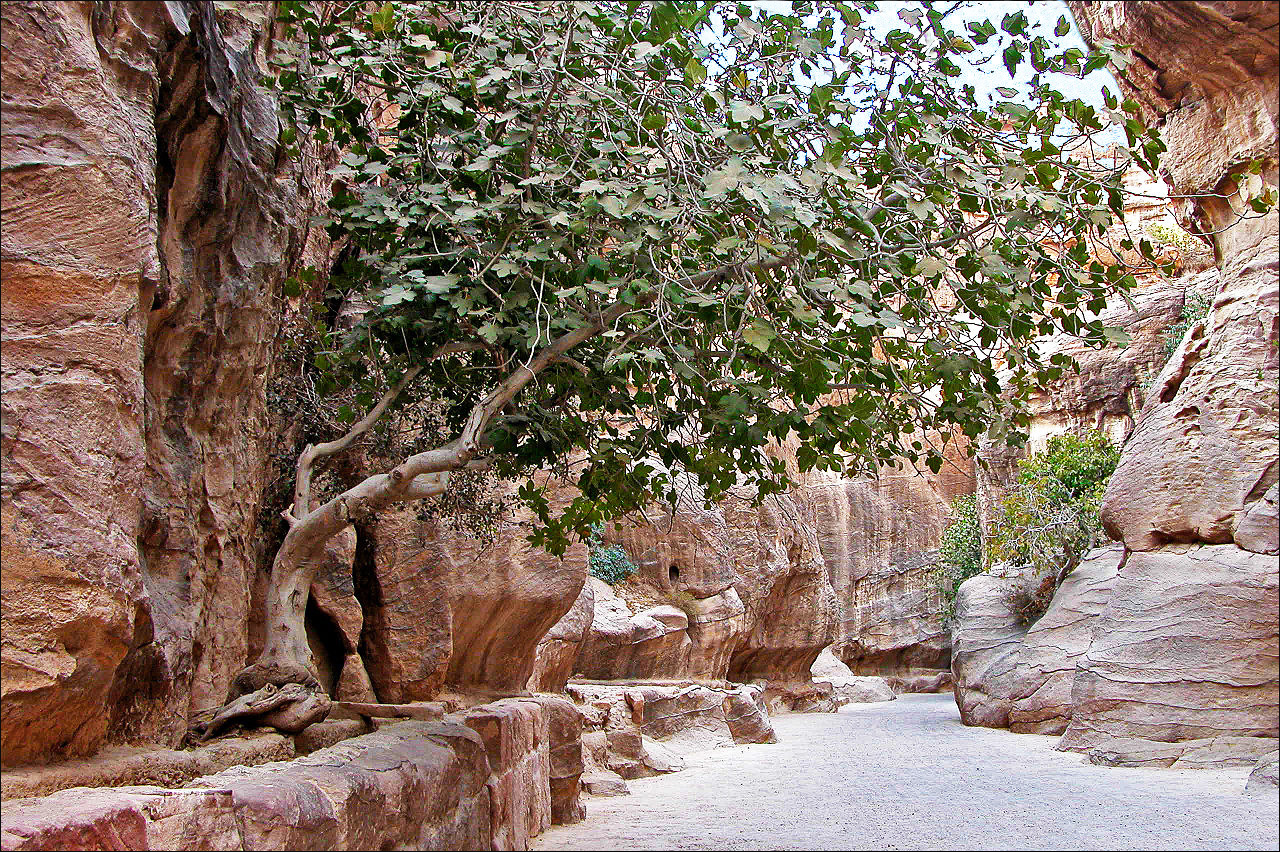
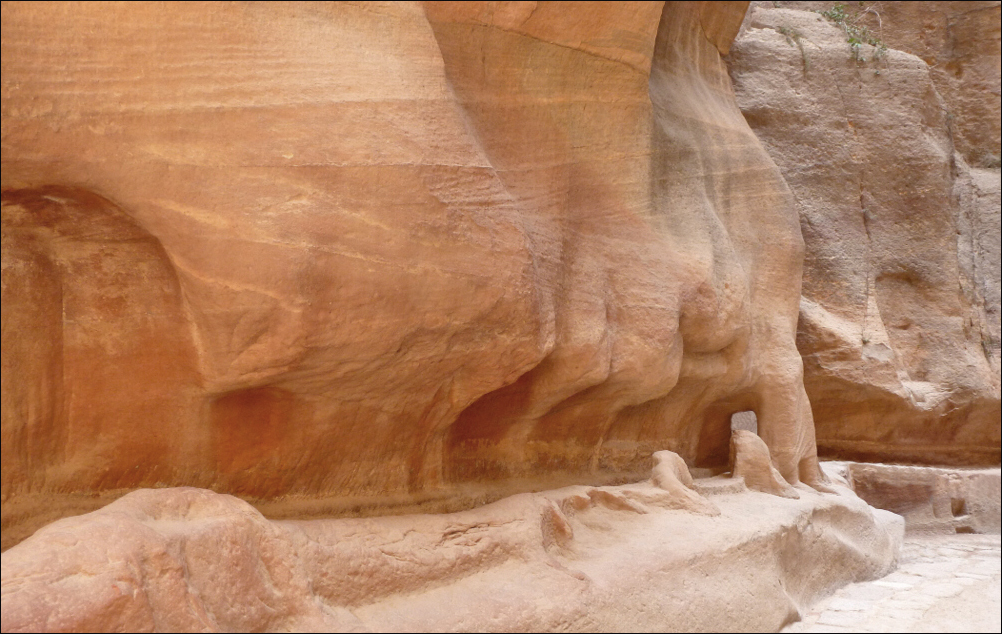
Water channels on the side of Al-Siq.

According to archaeologists, the canals covered with stones were used for the transport of water for domestic use, while the canals left in the open air were used to transport water intended for livestock or gardens and agriculture. At the time of the Roman occupation, the digging of canals on the mountainside was reinforced by the laying of terracotta pipes, sometimes placed themselves in the old canals on east side of the Siq. These new networks consisted of terracotta pipes – low-fired clay pipe – with sockets and mortar joints, with thicknesses that can vary from 1 to 6 cm and diameters from 15 to 25 cm.

"...Archaeologist Pilipp C. Hammond found pipes made of pottery sockets in the theater...". Some pipe networks were made of ceramic – high-fired clay pipes – with a thickness of 5 mm or sometimes less and a length of 30 cm. The peculiarity of these pipe networks was twofold: each pipe element, mainly those in terracotta, 30 to 100 cm long, had a narrowed shape in the middle, as if to create a "venturi" during the passage of water, a specific shape reminiscent of the shape of the terracotta pipes of the palace of Knossos in Crete. Another peculiarity of certain terracotta pipes laid in Petra is found in the sinusoidal undulations in the inner part of the pipe, made at the time of manufacture and which, according to experts, allowed an increase in the flow of the pipe.

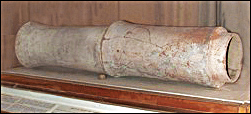
Tube of ceramic or terracotta from the Roman period, Petra.

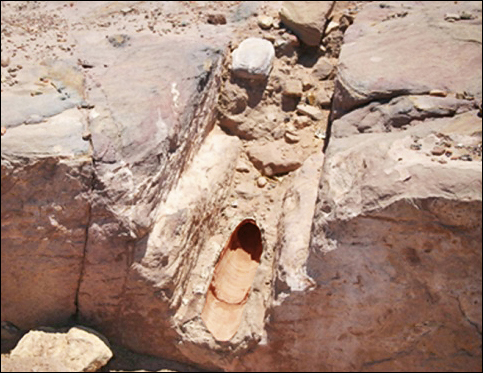
Remains of a terracotta pipe placed in a stone channel.

Most likely during the Roman period, lead pipes were used for the distribution of water to private houses, fountains and certain thermal baths. The use of this material was reserved either for the final connection of new installations, or in the context of network repairs. The network of pipes to the east of the Great Temple was modified at the time of the Roman occupation, in order to supply water to the souks as well as the commercial buildings along the Cardo after its Romanization. "...Sections of lead pipes were installed at the base of the Great Temple platform and continued eastward [...] The lead pipes generally indicate manufacture and use by the Romans before and after the modifications...”

The process of laying these terracotta pipes was also unique: generally installed in a gutter dug on the side of the mountain - this is the case of the pipes on one side of the Siq - its slope was calculated to allow maximum flow, with an optimized filling of the piping, leaving an air space in its upper part with a minimum loss by friction. This is an empirical application of the current principle of CFD Computational fluid dynamics, a branch of fluid mechanics that uses numerical analysis and data structures to analyze and solve problems that involve fluid flows, with the conservation laws (conservation of mass, momentum and energy) governing the motion of fluids. John Peter Oleson, classical archaeologist and historian of ancient technology, speaks of a 60 m stretch of pressure piping – probably ceramic hight-fired clay pipes, installed at the end of the Ain Braq aqueduct. The particularity of this section lies in the creation of an "inverted siphon", a technique widely used by the Romans, both in Gaul (siphons of Gier) and in other parts of the Roman Empire (Pergamon, Almuñecar, Gades (Cadiz), etc.).

Petra's water supply combined the use of two main sources: rainwater, available in the winter season, and spring water, with a more or less regular flow throughout the year. This concept of the dual design of the supply and distribution networks ensured that water can come from different sources, depending on the variations in spring flows and rainfall, allowing the filling of reservoirs and cisterns.

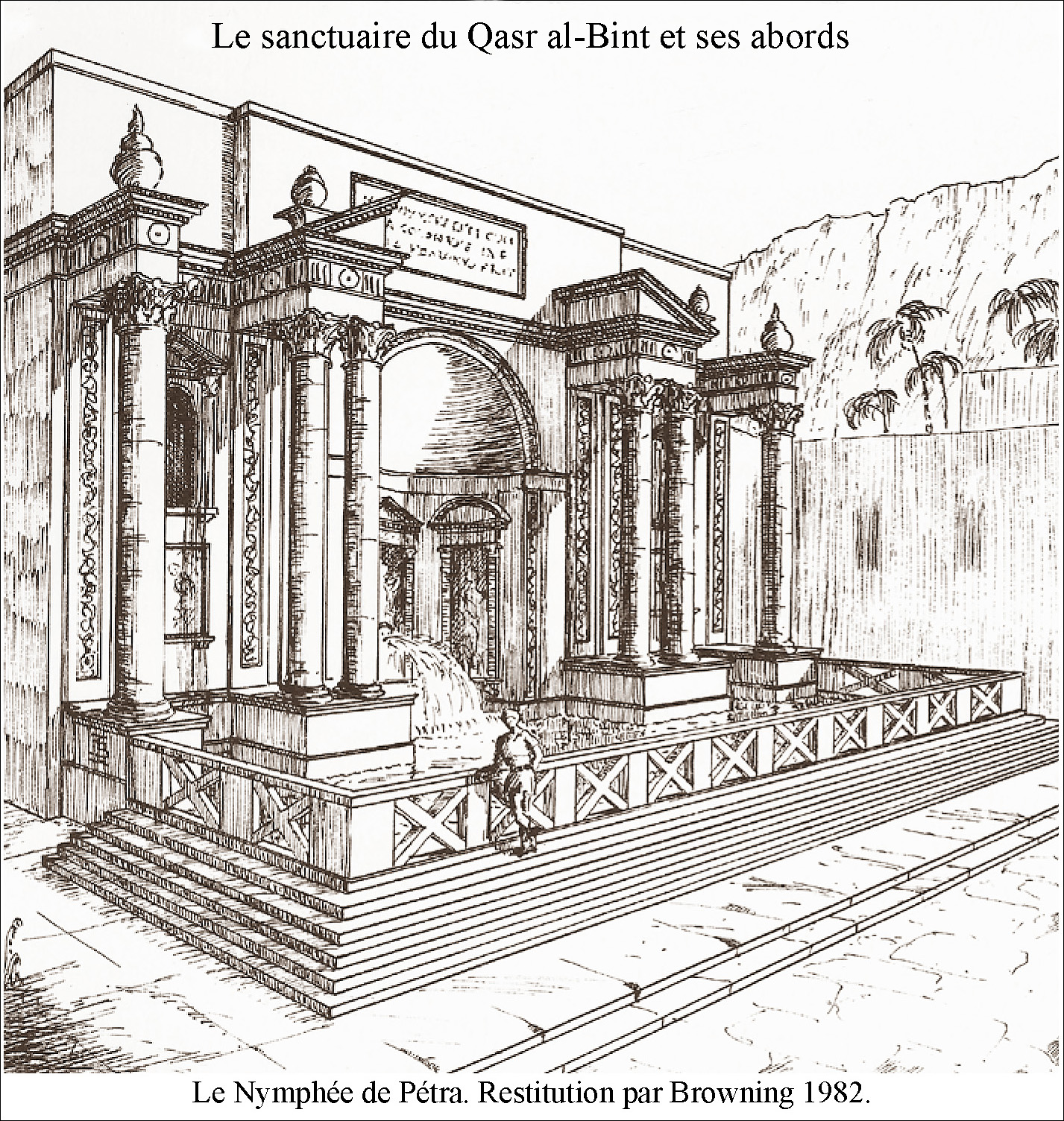
The Nymphaeum of Petra. Restitution by Browning in 1982.

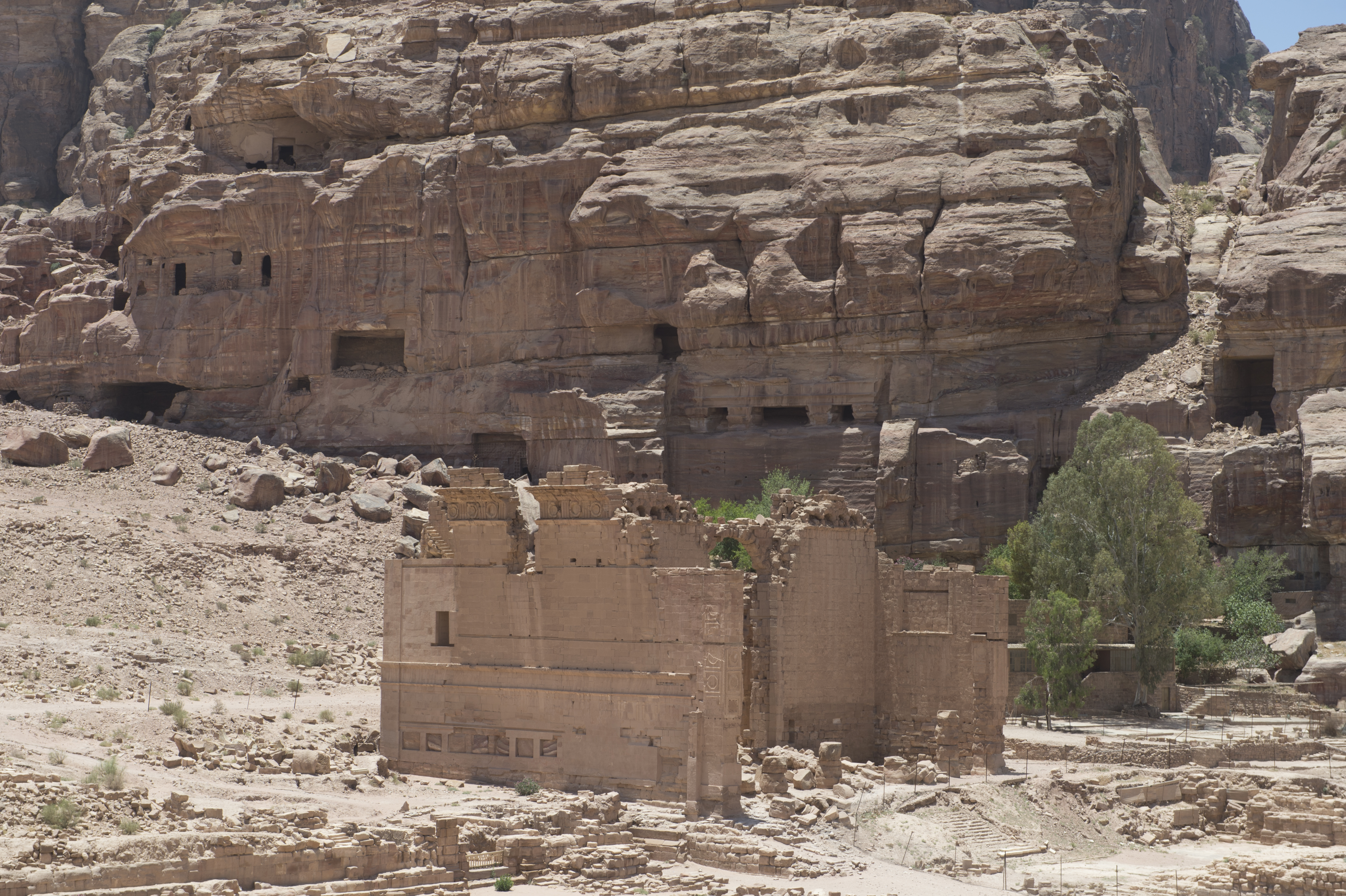
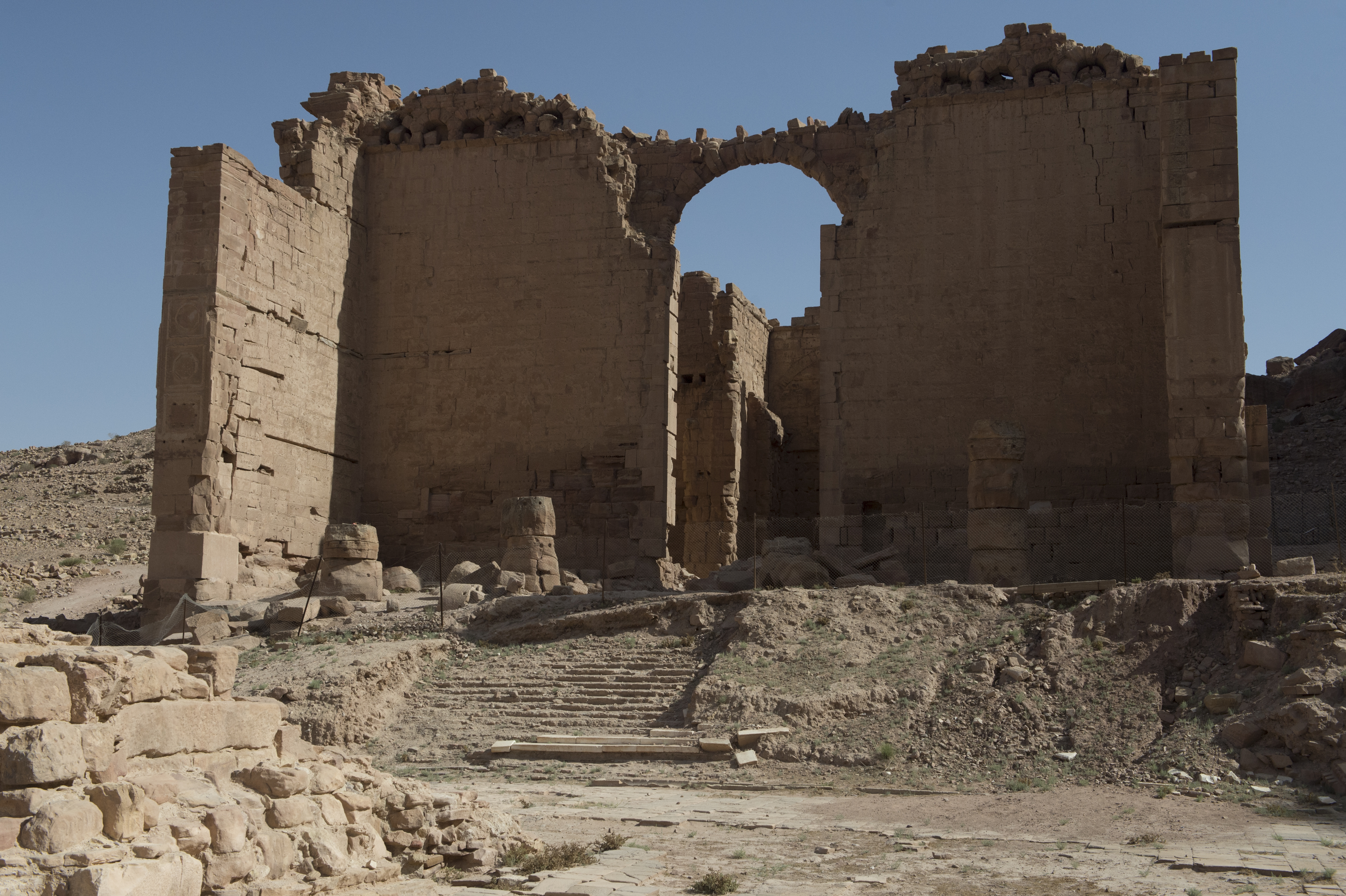
Qasr al-Bint temple complex (ar: قَصْر الْبِنْت), Petra.
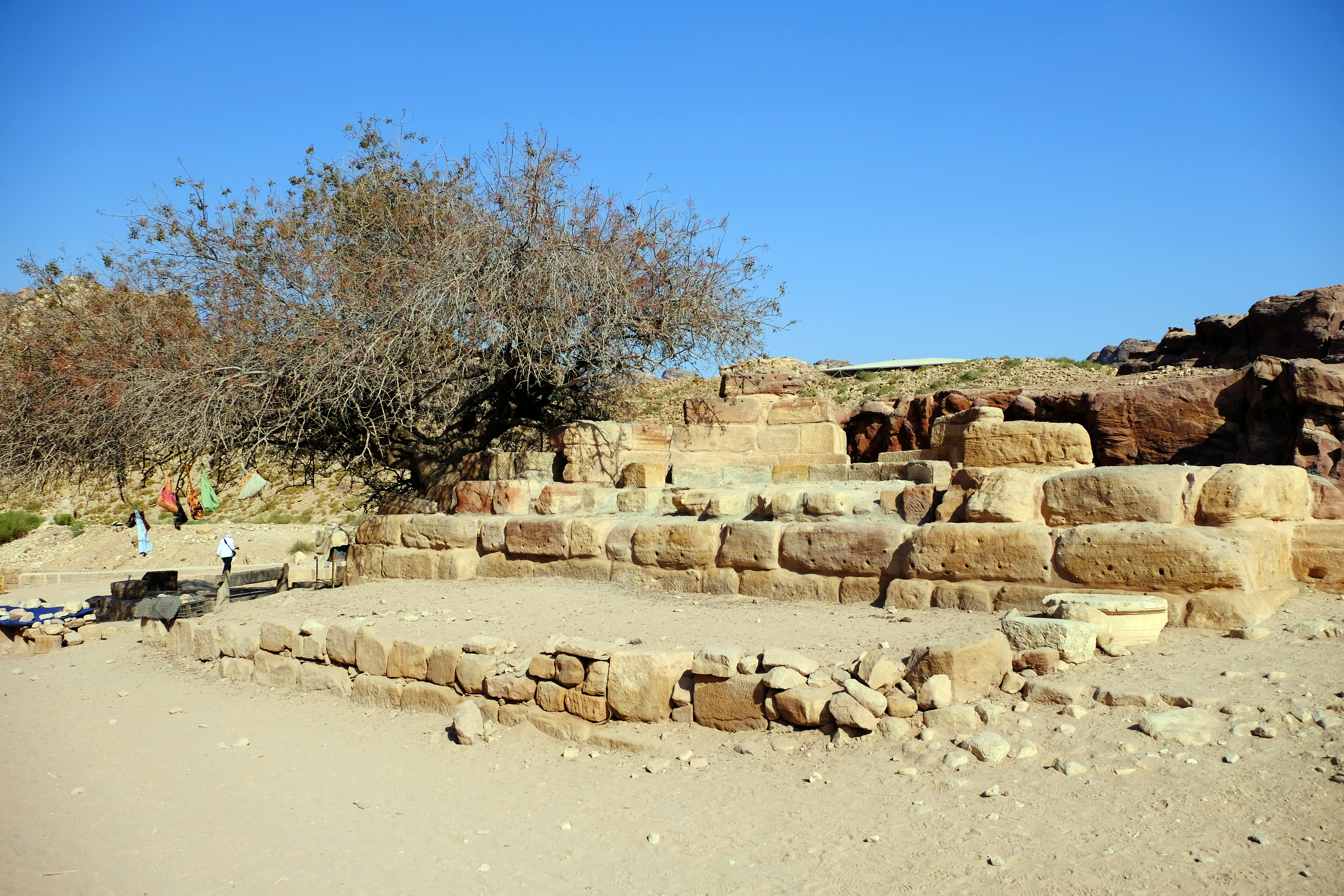
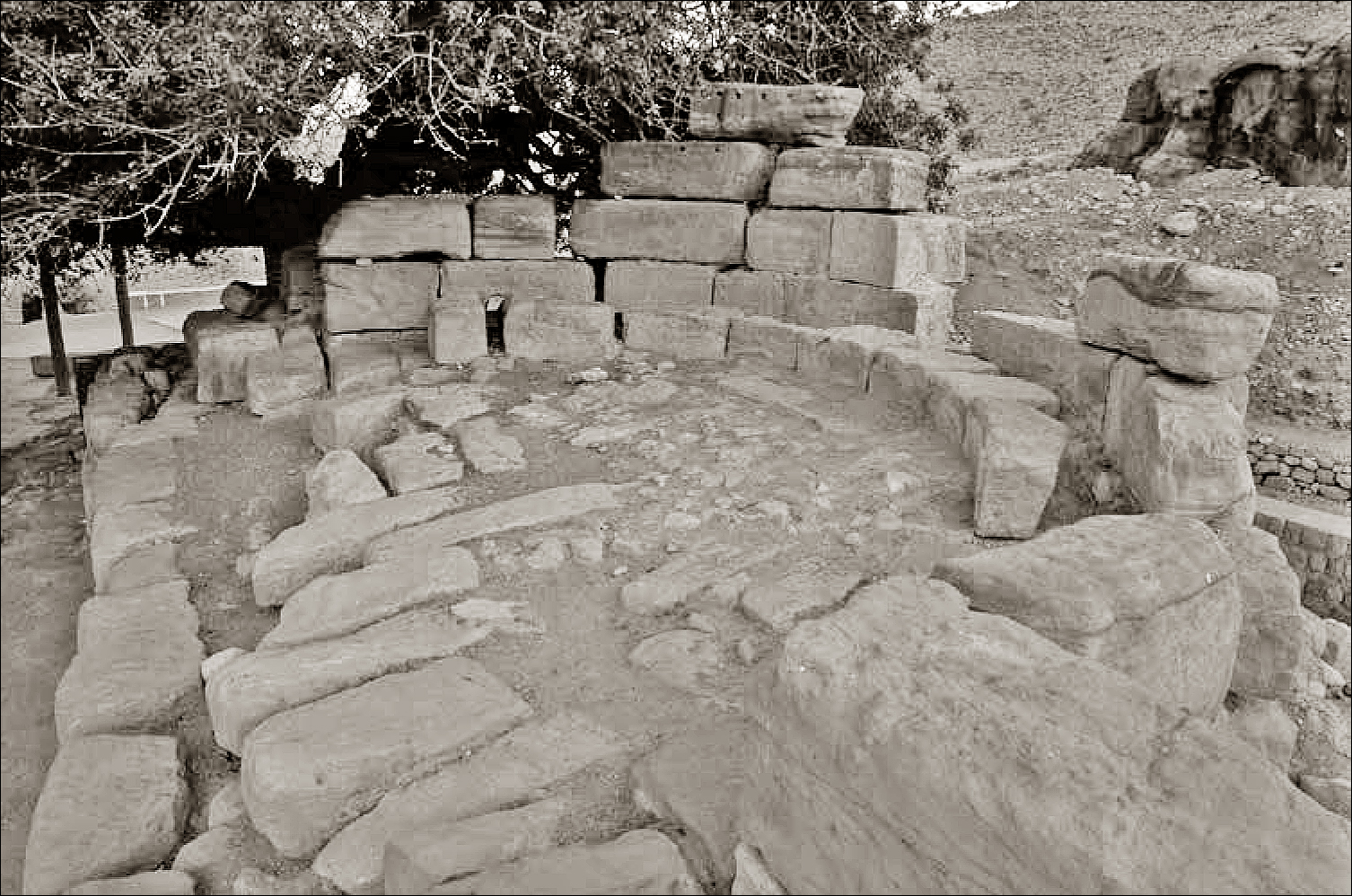
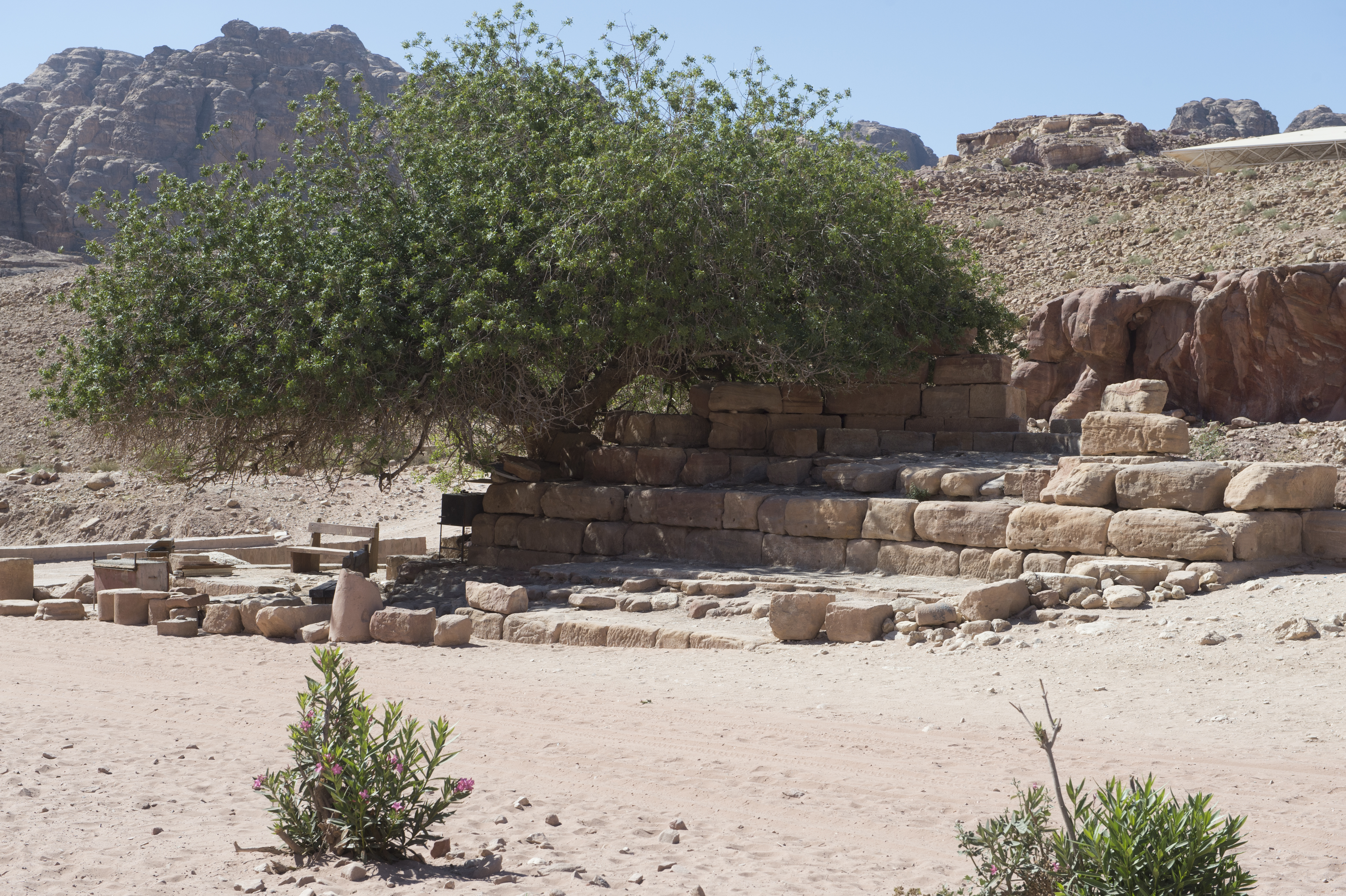
Remains of the Nymphaeums, Petra.

In order to also optimize the supply of certain areas of the city or of specific buildings such as thermal baths, nymphaeums, places of worship, Paradeisos (Koine Greek for enclosed parks), and private residences, the doubling of supplies for the supply of a place or a building made it possible to meet the water needs, whatever the variations in the flow of certain sources, or the contributions coming from the pluviometry. "...While there is no doubt that the Tomb of the Roman soldier complex had a rainwater supply system collected in a sophisticated network of multiple basins and cisterns, interconnected by pipes that linked the Wadi Farasah to the rest of the city of Petra, it is on the other hand more difficult to determine whether the site benefited from a substantial supply of fresh water...” (spring water).

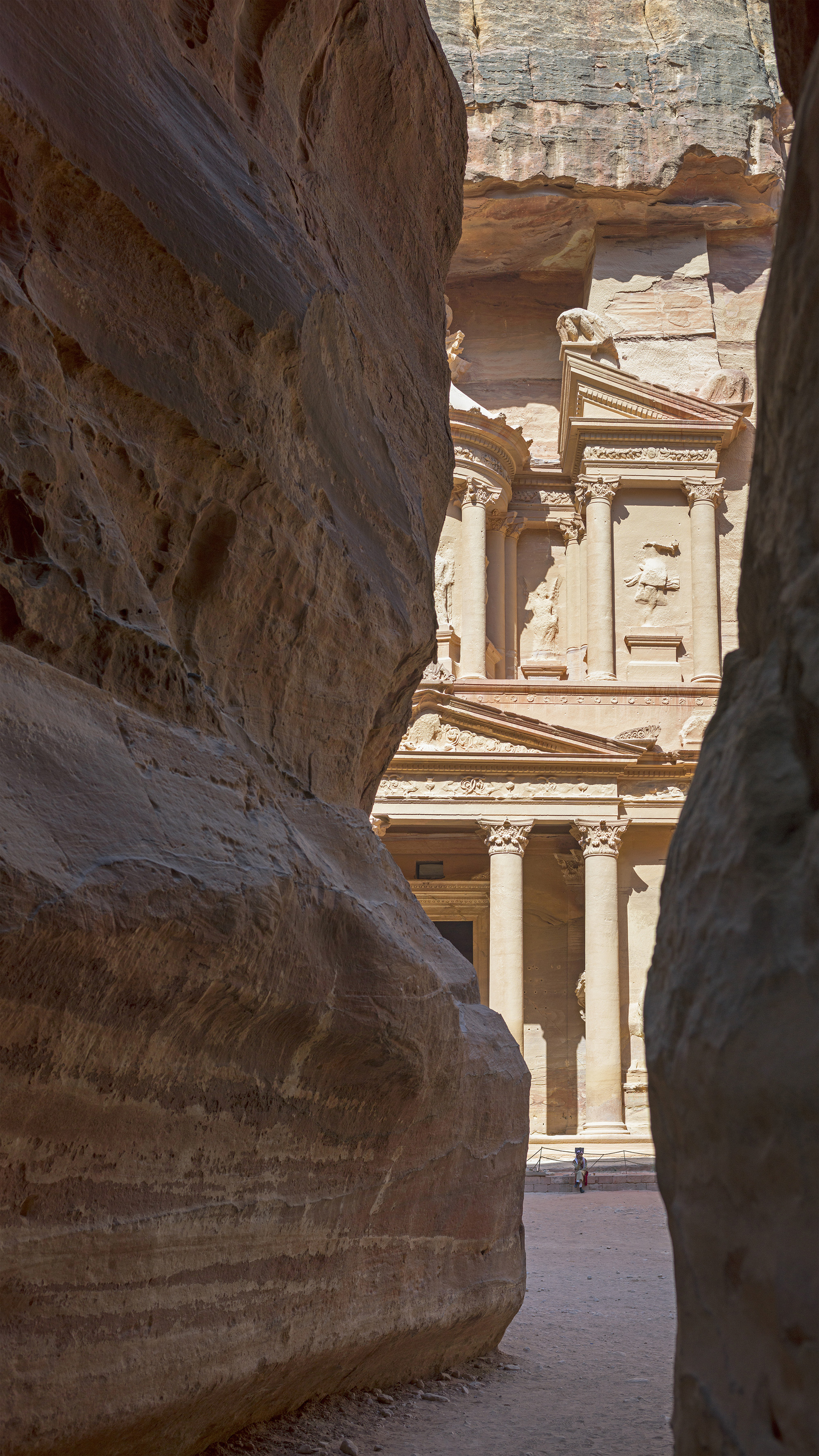
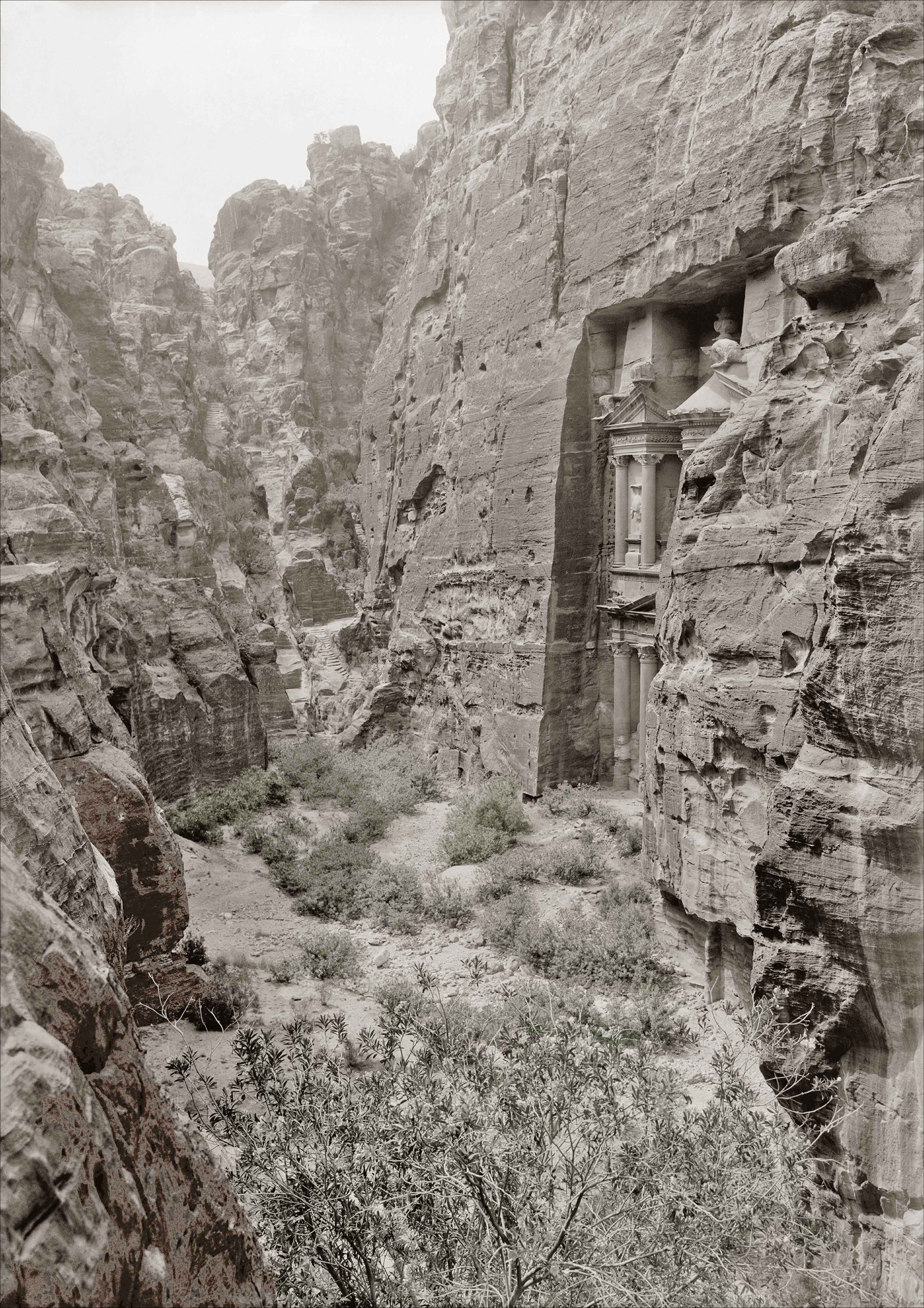
Al-khaznah seen from the Wadi Musa.

On the first section of the course on the east side of the Siq, the remains of several tens of meters of terracotta pipes are found, they remain above the path and finely interlocked and jointed; these pipes are embedded in a gutter carved into the mountain and covered with stones and mortar.

At the end of the Siq, where the Khazneh can be seen, on one of the sides of about fifty meters in length, the remains of this same terracotta pipe bringing water to downtown Petra are still visible. The short lengths of the terracotta or cut stone pipe elements – 30 cm to 60 cm or even 100 cm – made it possible to make fairly short bends and changes of direction, in particular for bypassing hills and mountains. On the opposite side of the Siq, an open gutter, perfectly well preserved, meanders over almost all of its course.

=== Maintenance ===
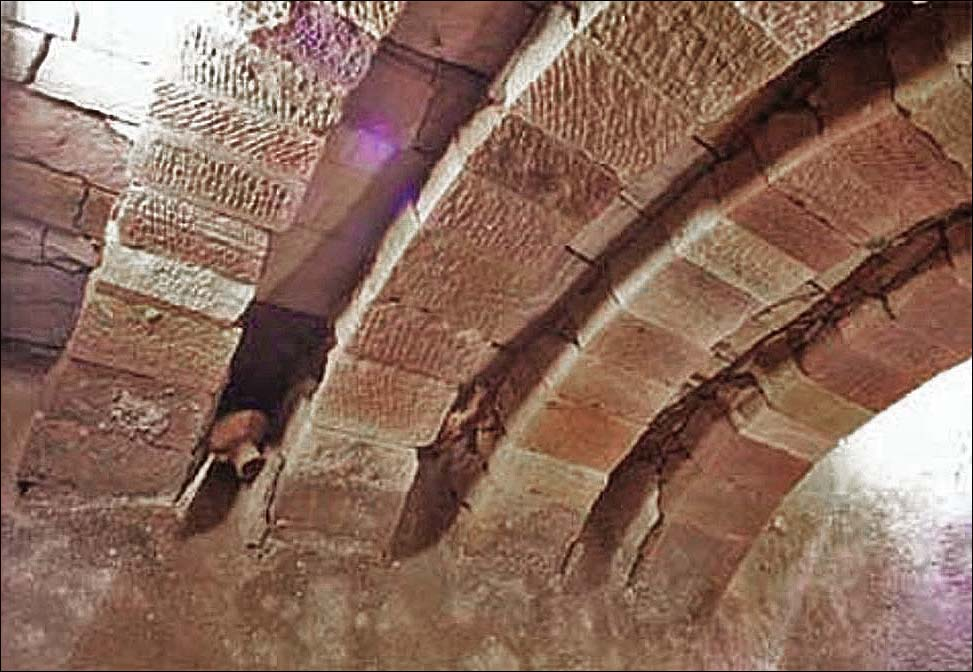
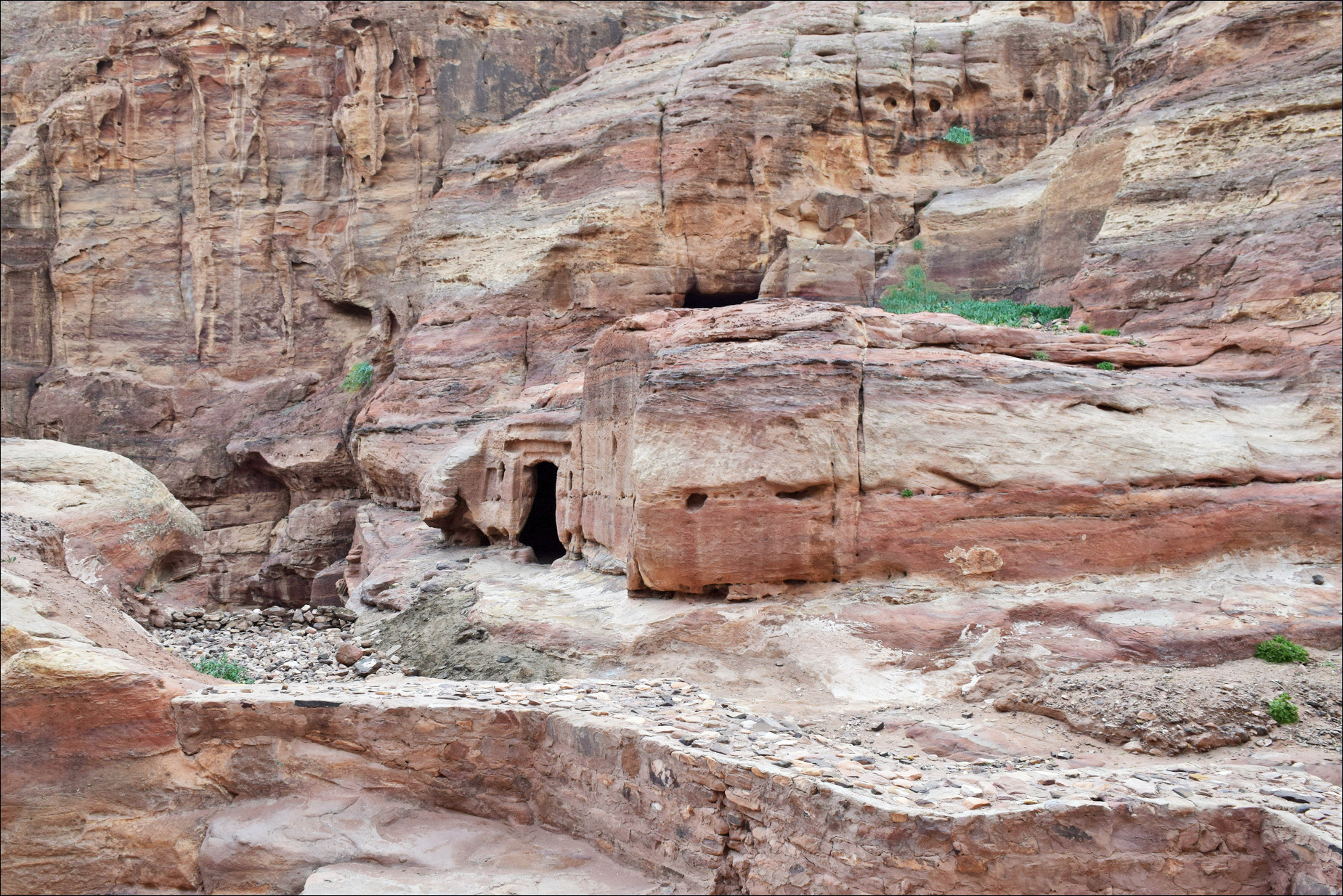
The support arches of the roof of a cistern under room 27 site ez Zantur IV. Gabions used as protections against erosions of a wadi (right).

The maintenance of the infrastructures of the entire hydraulic and hydrological system supplying the city of Petra was done according to a centralized management of the city's water. Due to its complexity, its different sources of water collection, the storage and the means of distribution, the network required the development and construction of equipment perfectly coordinated according to the needs, evolving over the centuries with the expansion of the city, but it also required quality, well-managed and regular maintenance of the hydraulic networks. "...it is indisputable that the management of water in the Petra region is an impressive testimony to the establishment of an efficient central administration, all the more remarkable in that it was established by ancient nomads."

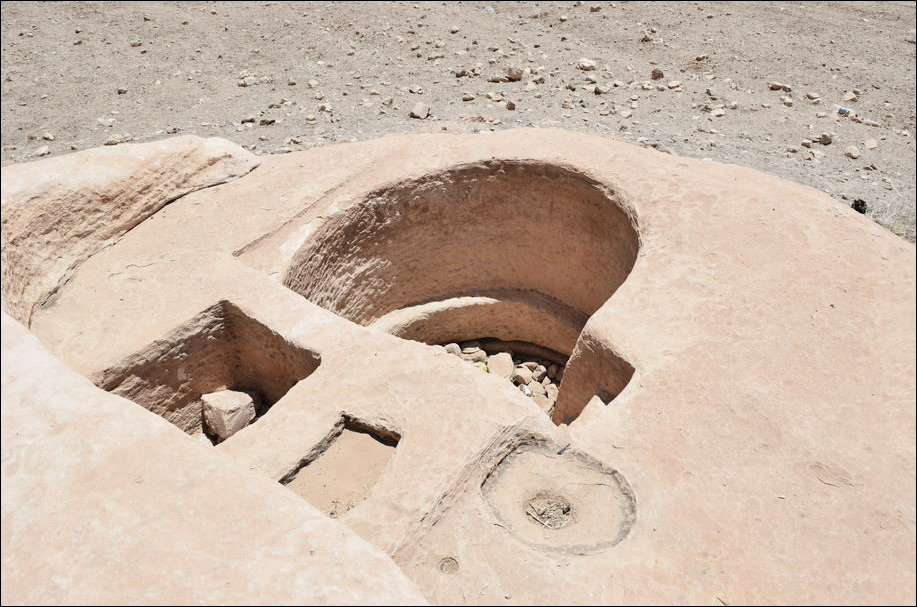
Cistern in the desert rock with a decantation tank.

For this it was necessary to train and sustain a skilled Arab Nabatean workforce for the construction and maintenance of this hydraulic assembly. "...The realization of the projects ultimately depended on a decision-making and regulatory authority which presupposed a structured political organization..." The design and installation of these complex networks over such long distances was the work of the Nabatean inhabitants skilled in the techniques of laying complex networks of pipes for the supply of the city of Petra, rather than the work of the nomadic segment of the population.

== Heat production ==
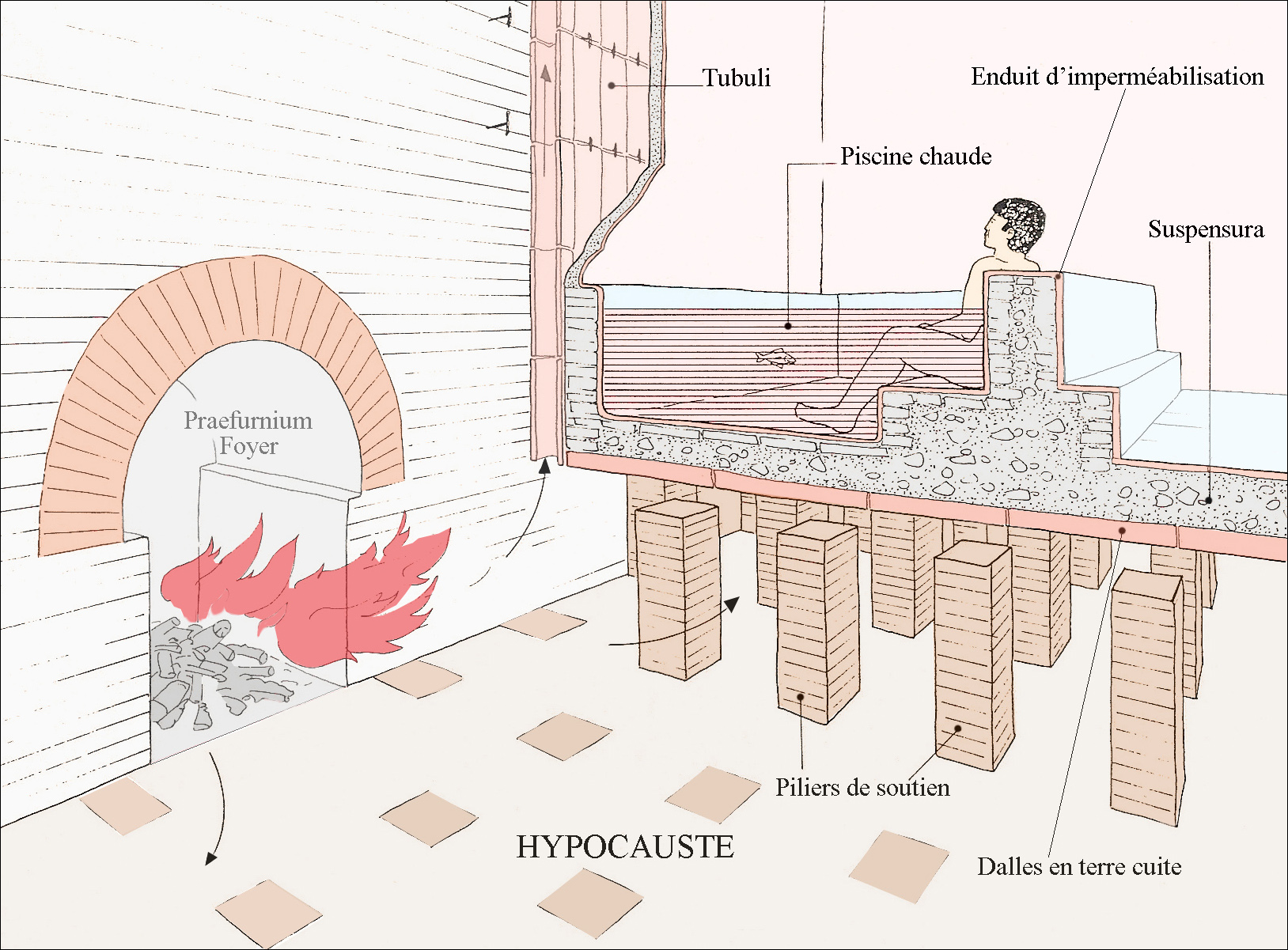
Schematic drawing showing the mechanism of the hypocaust.

The production of heat for the needs of the thermal baths, consists of several elements, the realization of which was worked on from the beginning of the construction of the thermal baths. Together with the water supply, the heat production forms the two main elements taken into account during the construction of the thermal baths. This heat production must be used to heat certain premises, as well as to heat water for hot baths.

- The heating room - Praefurnium - and the firewood storage room.
- The hypocaust with the pillars and its compound ceiling - Suspensura.
- The distribution of hot air, the tubes and the smoke evacuation ducts.

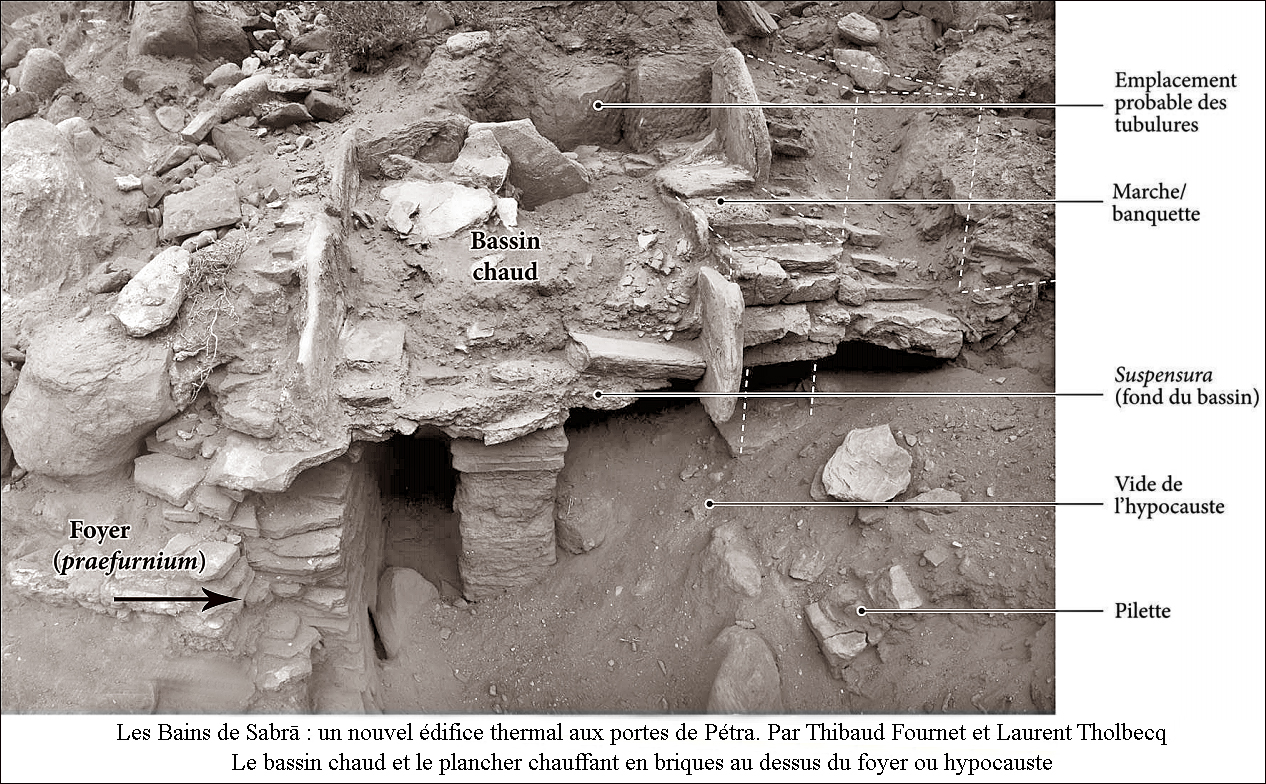
Hot basin and the hypocaust of the thermas of Sabra.

The heating system with the hypocaust worked by forcing hot air and smoke to circulate under a suspended floor raised by pillars (pilae). The heat radiated through the floor, heating the floor surface as well as the room and bath above. This heating system was invented by the Greeks in the 3rd century BC with an inefficient "proto-hypocaust", which used ducts placed under the floors and inside the walls, bringing hot air into rooms to be heated. The system was perfected by the Romans, with the principle of the suspended ceiling - Suspensura - in the 2nd century BC. known to be the hypocaust of Vitruvius, who himself adds: There are discoveries which, we know, date only from our time. “...The tubulus is a ceramic (terracotta) heating pipe developed by the Romans to create wall cavities through which hot air could circulate. An extension of the hypocaust system, tubuli systems, were one of the most advanced heating systems used in antiquity, and were used throughout the Roman Empire..."

=== Praefurnium ===
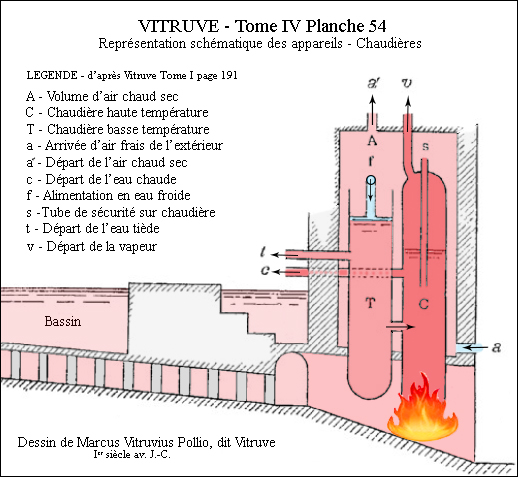
Schematic drawing of the production of heat.

The heating room or hearth - Praefurnium - is generally placed at a lower level of the premises to be heated, in order to facilitate the diffusion of heat as can be seen in al Biyara, wadi Sabra. With the natural slope of the terrain often taken into account. Depending on the importance of the thermal baths, there may be a single heating room, more or less large depending on the number of rooms and baths to be heated; some baths may have several hearths such as in ez Zantur.

The structure of this square or rectangular shaped room, had an opening on the ignition and fuel reserve side, as well as for the supply of fresh air and another opening on the side of the hypocaust, for the exit of smoke and gas as well as hot air. The walls were made of stone or brick, depending on the materials available. The walls were thick and the ceiling was often vaulted.

A room adjoining the hearth allowed the storage of fuel, wood or charcoal. This service room opened directly onto the outside, to facilitate the supply of fuel.

=== Hypocaust ===
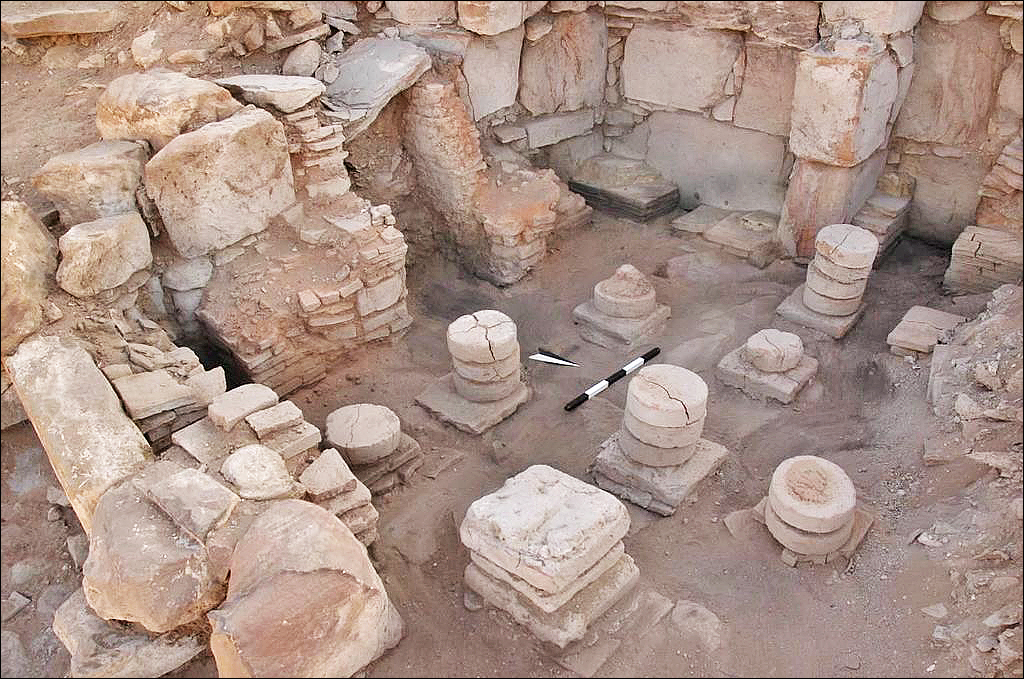
Remains of a hypocaust, Petra.

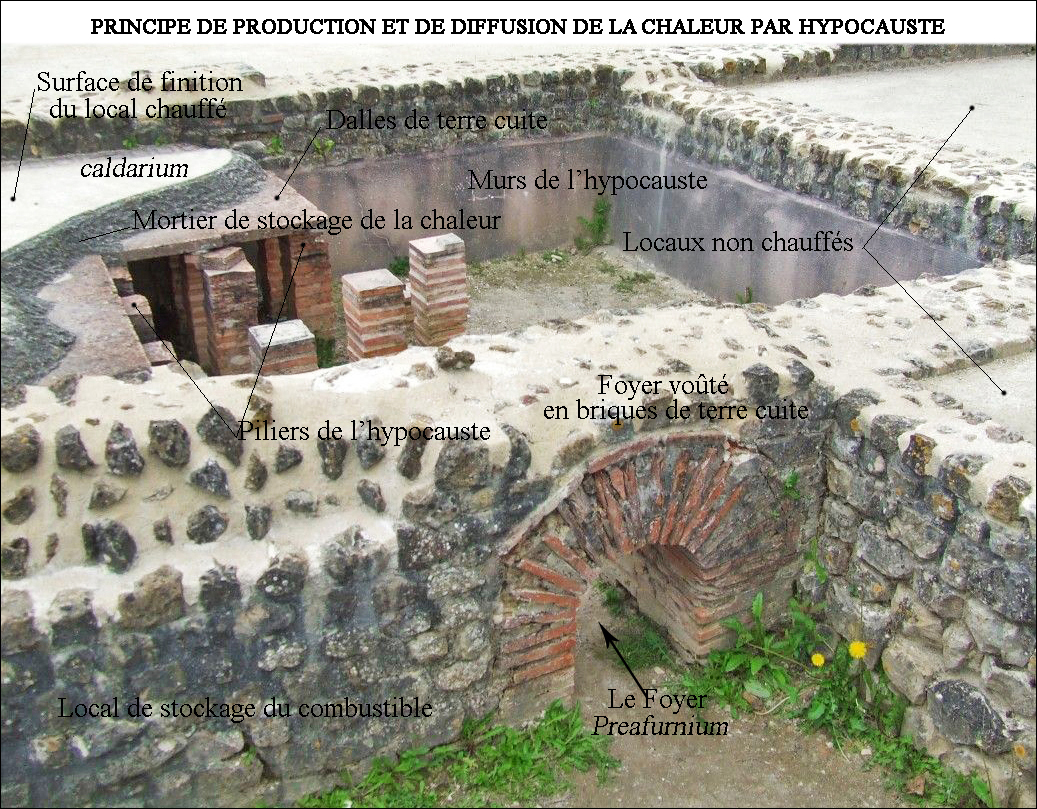
The elements of production and diffusion of heat by hypocaust.

The hypocaust was composed of several elements: generally there is a void under the building of 0.50 m to 1.00 m used for the diffusion and distribution of heat inside the premises, the ground is generally stabilized and clad in stone or rests on the rock. A set of brick pillars, of round or square section, supported the floor of the premises (suspensura) or the baths to be heated. “... The suspensura is a type of basement with a ceiling made of terracotta slabs, which are nothing more than large tiles supported on pillars. Care is taken to ensure that the progress of the fumes takes place in a constantly ascending movement; this condition agrees in the most natural way with the sloping arrangement of the riffles of the basins...”

Terracotta slabs used to rest on the pillars and form both the basic structure of the floor, a kind of formwork, which supported a thick layer of tile mortar. Before being covered by the stone or marble paving, a sealing layer was made, generally by lead plates. This compact assembly of terracotta slabs and mortar allowed heat storage with great inertia, and heat transmission by radiation. This heating principle also makes it possible to maintain the temperature, both in the volume of the premises, but also that of the ground. This required a certain skill in the management of the heat installation of the thermal baths, but also in the adjustment of all the parameters allowing to provide the right temperature in the premises and in the baths. This principle of heating was comfortable for the visitors of the thermal baths, it made it possible to maintain a constant temperature, long after the end of the fuelling of the hearth, without stopping it and allowing its fast resumption the following day.

=== Tubuli ===
The heating of the premises was also done by hot air distribution ducts called tubulis, these are elements of terracotta ducts of different shapes, allowing the circulation of hot air from the hypocaust to the upper parts of the thermal baths. Tubuli heating systems were one of the most advanced heating designs used in antiquity and were employed throughout the Roman Empire. The ducts were placed vertically against the exterior walls of the premises to be heated and sealed with mortar.

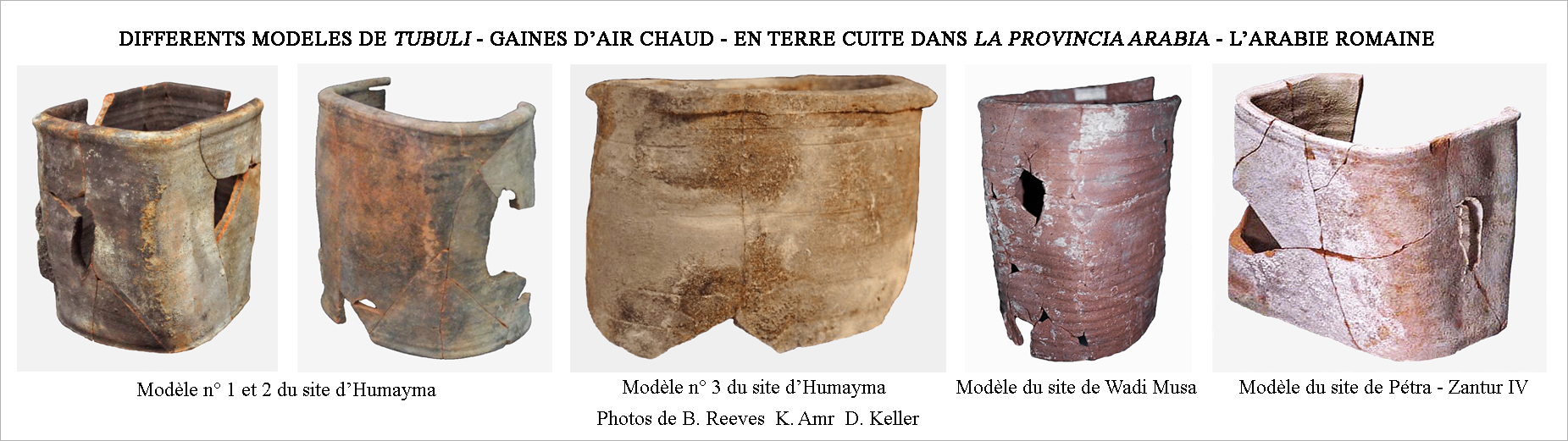
Various hot air ducts used in Roman Arabia and some of the thermal baths at Petra.

“...they formed vertical columns allowing hot air to circulate. To increase its circulation, ventilation holes were drilled in the side part of the ducts, allowing the transmission of hot air between the adjacent columns...” The first use of the tubulus dates from the end of the 1st century BC, with an improvement and a more intensive use, in particular in the thermal baths of Petra, in the 1st and 2nd century AD. The tubuli replaced the other techniques previously used for the heating by the walls. The first systems of wall heating, used by the Romans, were made up of terracotta plates, placed vertically against the walls and whose angles had a protuberance allowing them to be moved apart to allow air to pass - the tegulae mammatae. With other, less elaborate manufacturing systems, they were simple terracotta plates, fixed by hooks with their built-in spacer system.

Seneca the younger, a 1st century Roman philosopher, playwright and statesman, reveals that the wall heating system was most valued by the Romans for its ability to heat the rooms of the bath evenly, top and bottom: “.. It is to man, it is not to the sage, that we owe these inventions [...] like the baths suspended above their hearths, and these tubes, applied in the walls, which circulate heat and maintain it from bottom to top always equal...”

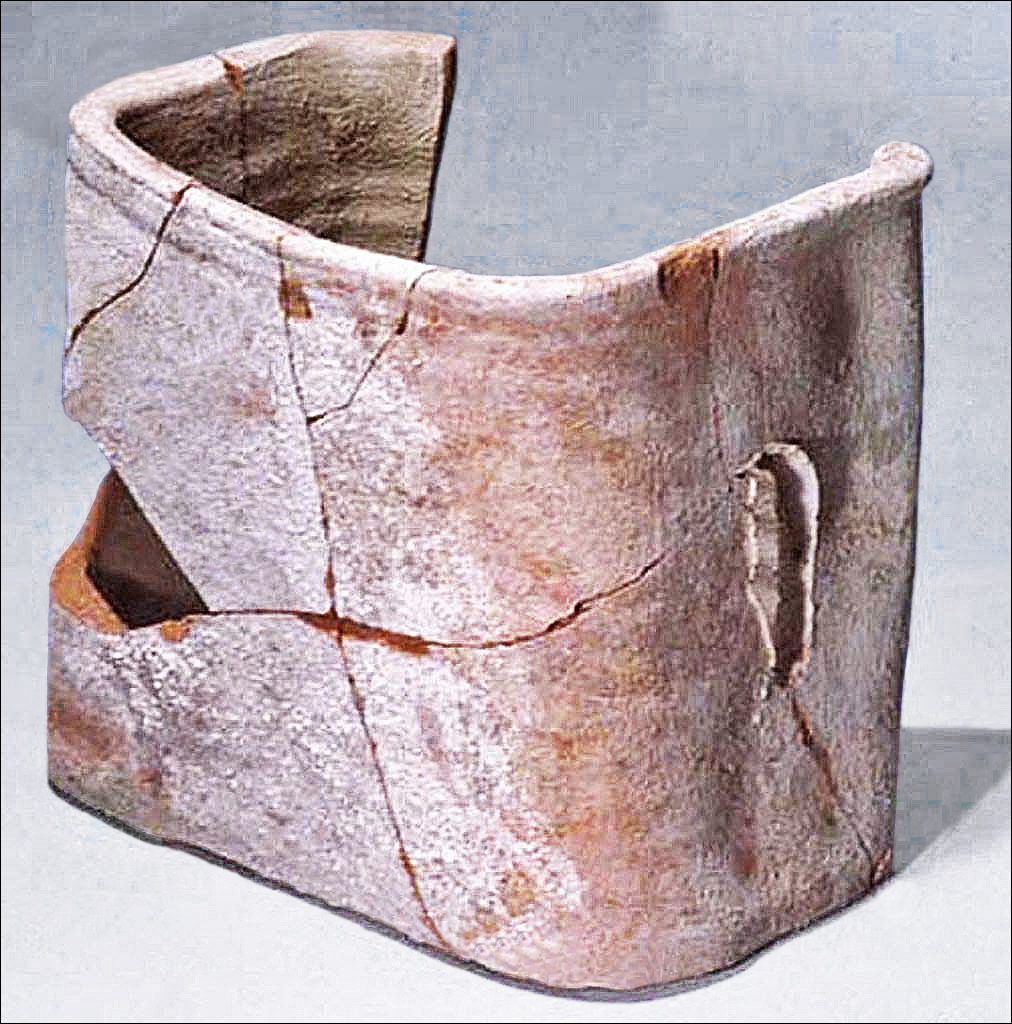
Residence of ez Zantur IV. Terracotta hot air duct.

The vertical shafts were jointed and fixed to each other, and sealed to the walls with mortar. In some cases, T-hooks placed between two elements and fixed to the walls allowed the maintenance and proper spacing of the ducts. The whole was generally covered with stucco, before finishing with marble slabs or mosaic. Parts of the ducts had openings to allow the passage of air from one duct to the other.

In the rooms which required a high temperature - laconicum, sudatorium - the ceiling was vaulted and was equipped with an opening in the upper part, with a bronze disc which, depending on its position, made it possible to regulate the temperature in the room. Many remains of tubuli networks have been found during the various excavations, particularly for the lower part of the networks, but due to the fragility of the material constituting the tubuli, the upper part of the network is mixed among the terracotta debris and the archaeologists and historians know very little about this upper part of the heating system.

=== Heating of the basins ===
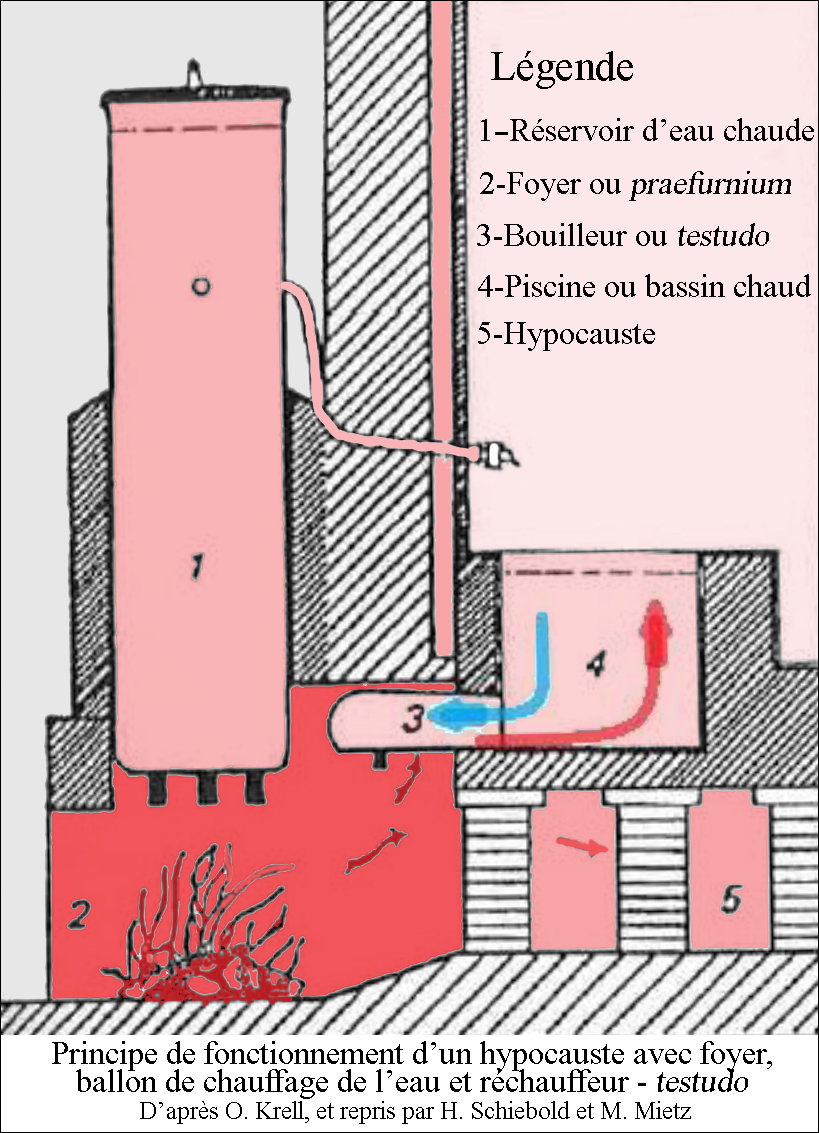
Schematic drawing of the heat production of thermas.

The heating of the basins, generally supplied with cold water by a nearby tank, was done partially by the transmission of heat through the floor of the hypocaust, but this means of heating the water was not always sufficient. The increase in the temperature of the basin or the swimming pool was then done by means of boilers (hot water tank) placed above a hearth which heated the water of the baths to the desired temperature, for the lukewarm bath of the tepidarium and hot bath for the caldarium. These boilers were to supply the laconicum, a hot and dry room, and the sudatorium, the hot and humid room.

The base part of the tanks, in contact with the fire, was in brass - bronze - the upper part was in lead. In order to reduce the heating time of the water in the basins and to allow better control of the diffusion of heat, many thermal baths included a metal "box", the testudo, generally made of copper, open at the bottom of the basin, and closed on the chimney side. This closed part was exposed to the heat of the hearth, thus heating the water of this part of the basin; the temperature difference between the very hot water of this "heater" and the colder temperature of the basin created a circular current equalizing the temperature in the basin

=== Drainage of the basins ===
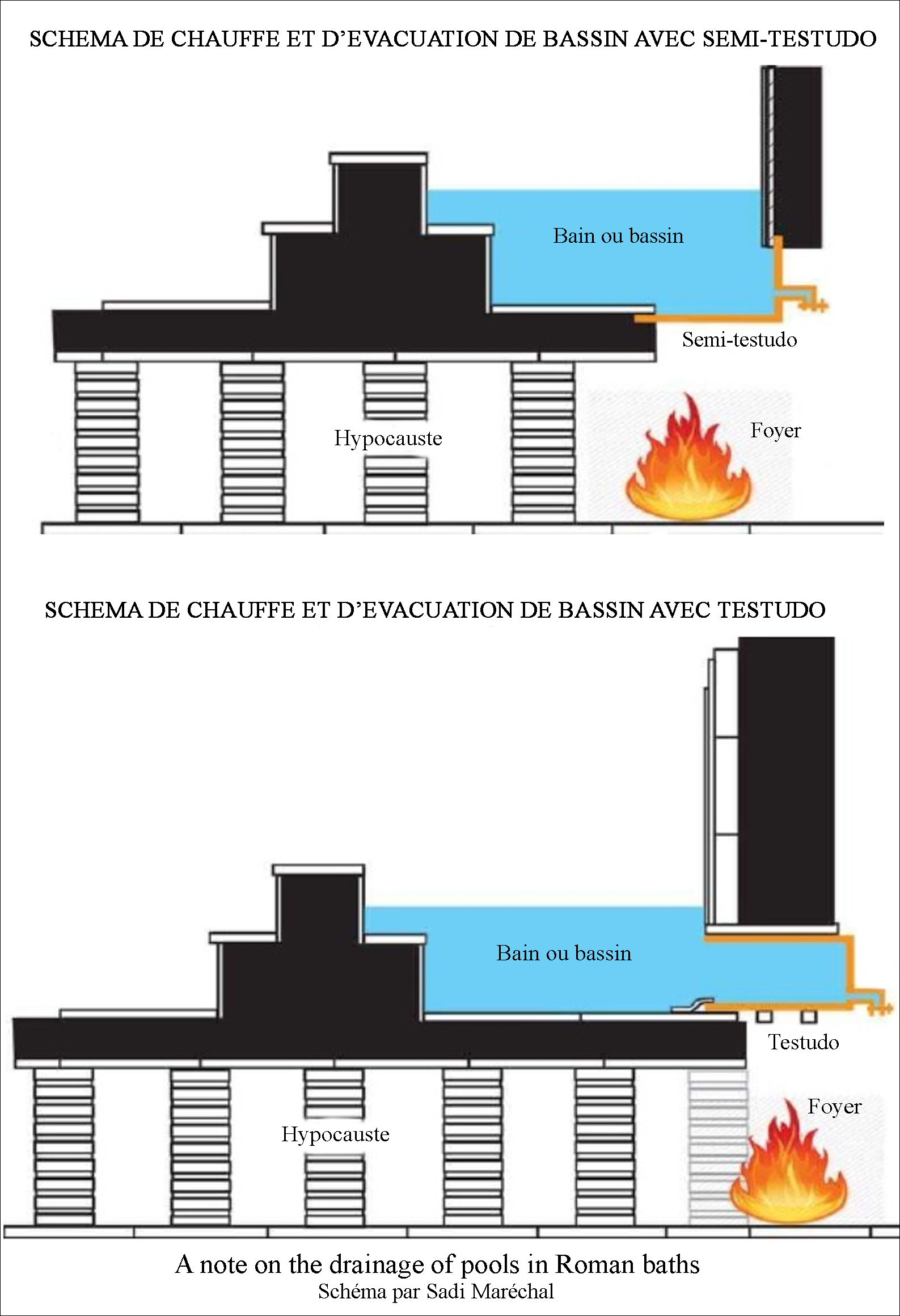
Schematic drawing of the production of heat for the Roman baths.

The drainage of the basins and swimming pools, or cold baths, the frigidarium and the loutron, as well as the swimming pools and piscinae, which were fed by a water tank, itself fed by an aqueduct, was generally done according to the Roman technique, which was to direct the evacuation or emptying water, lightly charged, towards the latrines, then being used for the evacuation of the most major waste, before being led towards the wadis. The emptying of these basins could be done directly in the water network of the city, or the nearby wadi.

The emptying of the basins and hot baths was done from a tap fixed to the "heater" - testudo or semi-testudo - then directed directly into a canal bringing the water into the city network or a wadi. The drain could also be used to clean the floor of the hypocaust below, before being sent to a canal connected to the city network or directly to a wadi; in some cases the water passed through the hearth and was used to clean it, insofar as it was cold. Vitruvius in the 1st century BC, in his book Volume I on the heating of the thermal baths, gives the explanations to the way this system worked: “...The hearth is installed in the basement. The water, supplied by a reservoir fed by the city pipes, is gradually heated in a boiler T and a boiler-boiler C. The body of these boilers is housed in a masonry chamber and receives [...] direct heat from the fireplace. [...] The warm water boiler communicates with the food basin (of cold water) and the boiler, with the warm water boiler. So that any hot water intake is automatically replaced by an influx of lukewarm water; the latter in turn, by an influx of cold water..." As for the various thermal baths of Petra, the destruction due to earthquakes, the wear and tear of time or the flooding of the wadis, did not yet make it possible to perfectly define the drainage system of the various basins and swimming pools, the excavations of which are still in progress.

=== Smoke evacuation ===
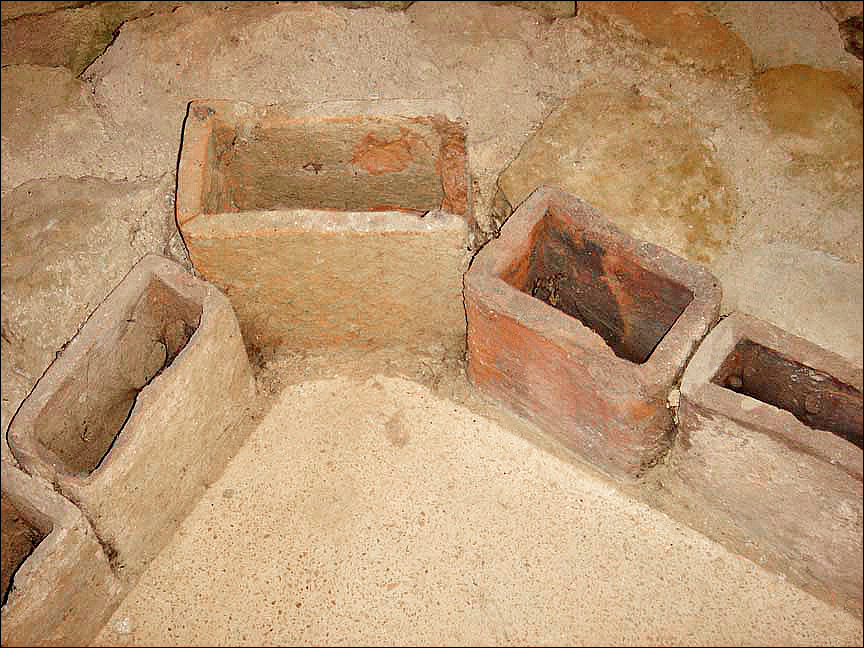
Hot air and smoke ducts used in the Roman baths at Petra.

The evacuation of smoke, like the suitable diffusion of hot air, was an integral part of the proper functioning of a hypocaust and of the whole heat production of the system. The flue was directed into the chimney in the upper part, or sent directly outside by crossing the ceiling or the terrace. The hearth was fed according to the heat needs in the premises and in the pools. This work was intended for slaves, specialized in the proper functioning of the thermal baths, supervised by the balneator or supervisor of the thermal baths.

The smoke pipes, in terracotta, were generally placed next to the hot air ducts (tubuli) conveying high temperature air. They also helped to heat the premises.

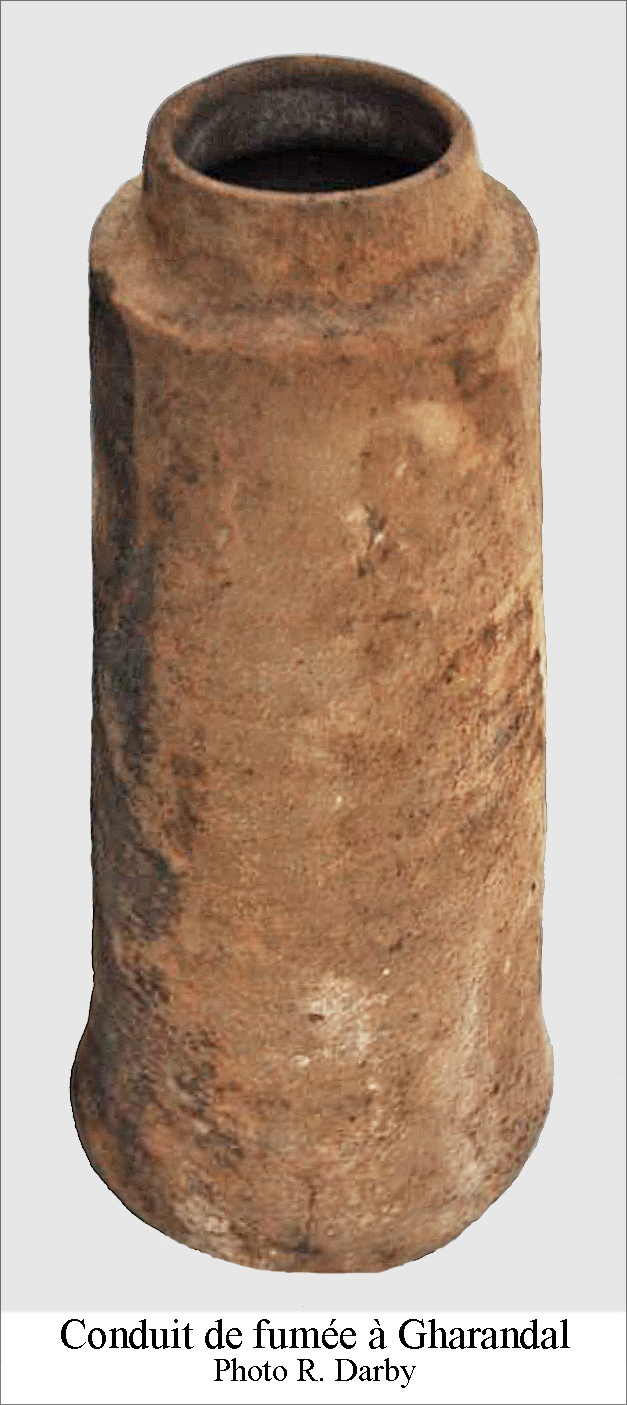
Terracotta smoke pipe.

The hot air ducts as well as the flues had an active role in the heating system of the thermal baths, but they also had a passive role in the insulation of the buildings and avoided condensation on the walls.

In 1998, a team of archaeologists and engineers reconstructed a set of thermal baths, using materials and techniques from the Roman period: "...This experience has made it possible to better understand many aspects of the construction and operation public baths, including the unresolved relationship between the tubuli (carrying the hot air) and the smoke exhaust ducts...” The most economical design had the hot air tubuli completely separate from the fireplace. In this system, each column of tubuli was blocked in the upper part and the smoke coming from the hearth and the hypocaust did not pass into the tubuli, they were evacuated directly, in the upper part, outside the building, or In the chimney.

Once the trials were complete and all the data collected, the engineers found that the method of blocking off three out of four tubuli columns and leaving the last remaining open proved to be effective. Despite the low draft, hot air circulation still took place in the tubuli, and the wall was sufficiently heated. But the tubuli were not completely effective in removing smoke and gases from the hypocaust. This discovery suggests that the heating systems could operate efficiently, without a direct connection to the smoke exhaust duct. The question of the separation of toxic fumes and hot air, at the exit of the hearth, does not seem to be perfectly well defined by archaeologists and historians. According to Vitruvius, the evacuation of smoke was done by means of pottery tubes, which placed along the wall allowed the draft of the hearth. «...The use of fuel with a clear flame, avoided excessive soot deposits...».

=== Operation and maintenance ===
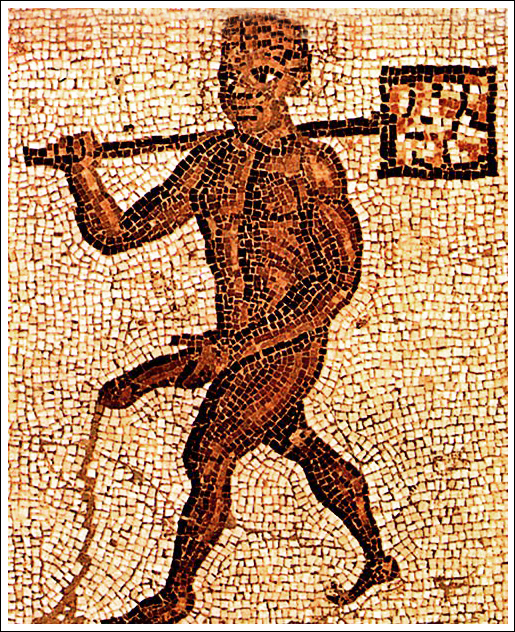
Mosaic of a slave carrying embers for the hearth of the baths.

The operation and maintenance of the facilities were managed by several teams of slaves, generally housed on site, who were responsible for maintaining the premises of the thermal baths, ensuring the constant supply of water, cold and hot, and their correct temperature depending on the baths. The slaves assigned to the thermal baths were also responsible for the maintenance and proper functioning of all the heat production for the thermal baths: hearths, hypocausts, air diffusion ducts and smoke ducts. The slaves had to ensure the permanent supply of the hearth according to the hours of use, in order to maintain a pleasant temperature in the premises and in the baths at the time of their occupation, but keeping the costs of using fuel to a minimum.

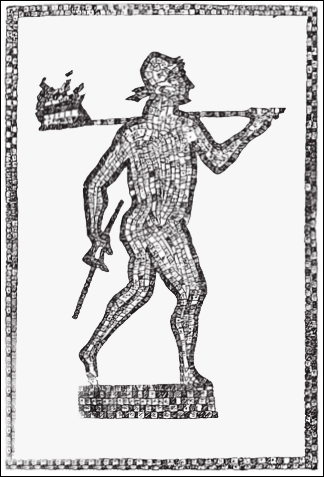
Mosaic of a slave in Roman baths carrying the fire to the hearth with a fire iron in his hand.

The stoker, or man in charge of the household, was called a fornacator (Note: Not to be confused with fornicator.) and was usually a slave. Two North African mosaics support this claim. Both show naked men carrying a basket filled with embers. That of Bir-Shana Moghane, shows the flaming embers, to underline its link with the hearth of the thermal baths - praefurnium - and also includes a fire iron in the other hand. The fire iron could symbolize the task of the fireman who was also to supervise the combustion in the hearth, to correct the air supply if necessary for the good combustion of wood or coal. It could also indicate that some skill was needed to balance the airflow, the air diffusion temperature in the hypocaust and the tubuli, the energy efficiency and the water temperature of the baths.

Restarting the thermal baths after a complete shutdown took several days and significant fuel consumption. The thermal baths, according to their importance, could be either private, or be public buildings belonging to the city; there were also imperial baths, under the direct responsibility of the Emperor.

A set of baths was run by a director - conductor - usually controlled by the municipality. A guardian of the thermal baths - curator operis thermarum or balneator - had the function of supervising the work of each of the workers on the site; the balneator was a free man. The fornacatores in charge of the homes were slaves who lived on site, they worked as a team; their task was to ensure the continuity of the home's supply, from the stock of fuel and the orders of the supervisor or balneator, to maintain the correct temperature of the pools, to the satisfaction of the owners and users of the thermal baths. “...The good reputation of the thermal baths was that it was always sufficiently warm; the supervisor was held responsible for the quality of the baths. [...] The citizens could complain to the municipal supervisor if the baths were not heated enough..." Teams of slaves specialized in the maintenance of the baths, were also to be always present on the site, in order to quickly repair any faults that may arise during the occupation of the thermal baths. The preventive and programmed maintenance of the thermal baths by the supervisor, had to occupy a certain number of qualified slaves in the cleaning of the basins and the aqueducts of water supply, the recovery of the marble or mosaic slabs, the degradations due to infiltrations of water, the replacement of the elements of the hearths destroyed by the fire. Other teams had to take care of the maintenance of the access roads as well as around the thermal baths.

== Techniques and materials ==
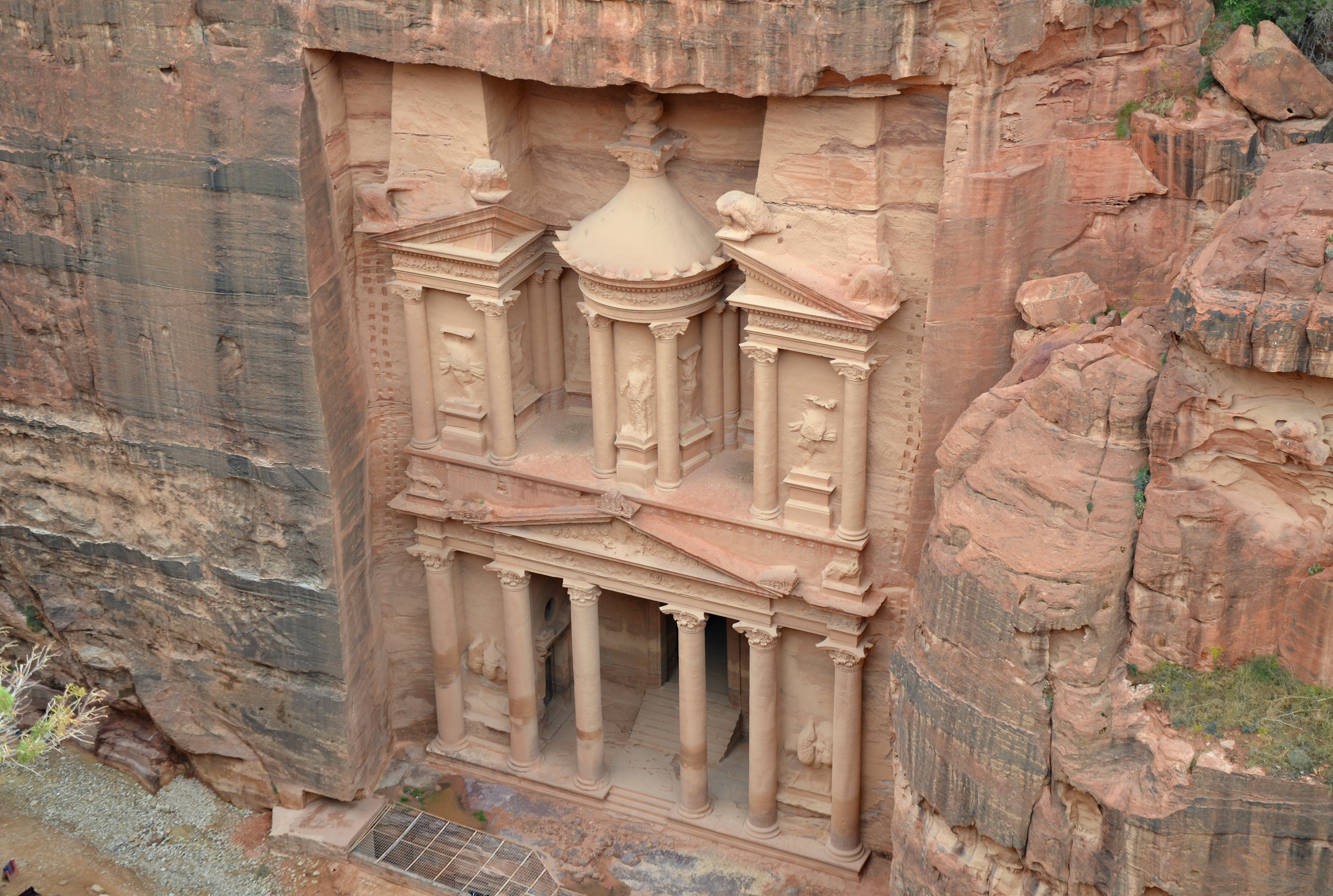
Al Khazneh or the Treasury at Petra

Artisans in the Nabataean city of Petra, in modern Jordan, extended the Western Asian tradition, carving their temples and tombs into the yellowish-orange rock that defines the canyons and gullies of the region. These structures, dating from 1st century BCE to about 2nd century CE, are particularly important in the history of architecture given their experimental forms. Because the structures served as tombs, the interiors were rather perfunctory. In Petra one even finds a theater where the seats are cut out of the rock.

Small-scale production of concrete-like materials was pioneered by the Nabatean traders who occupied and controlled a series of oases and developed a small empire in the regions of southern Syria and northern Jordan from the 4th century BC. They discovered the advantages of hydraulic lime, with some self-cementing properties, by 700 BC. They built kilns to supply mortar for the construction of rubble masonry houses, concrete floors, and underground waterproof cisterns. They kept the cisterns secret as these enabled the Nabataeans to thrive in the desert. Some of these structures survive to this day.

== Architects and stonemasons ==
=== The architect Apollodorus ===
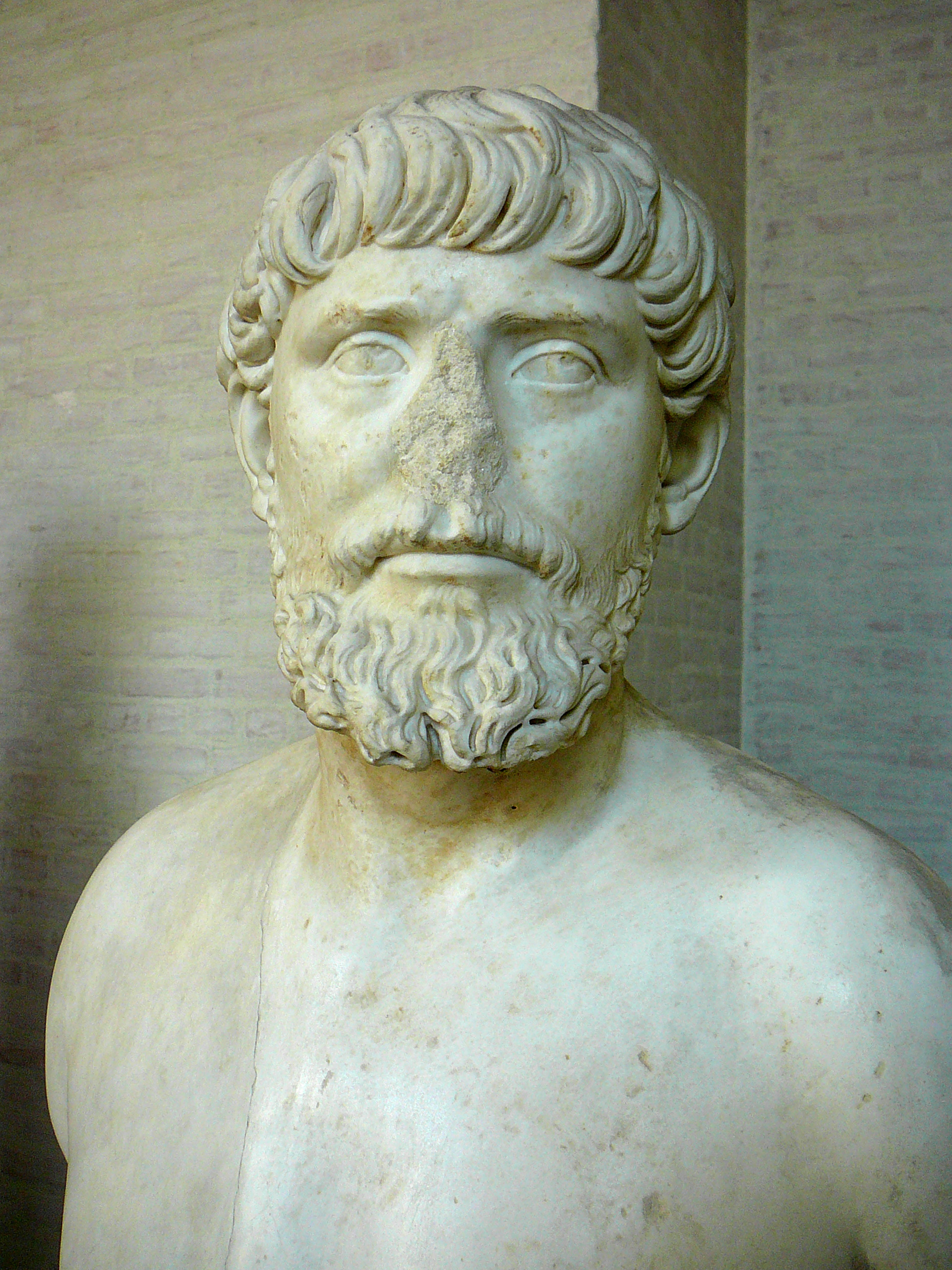
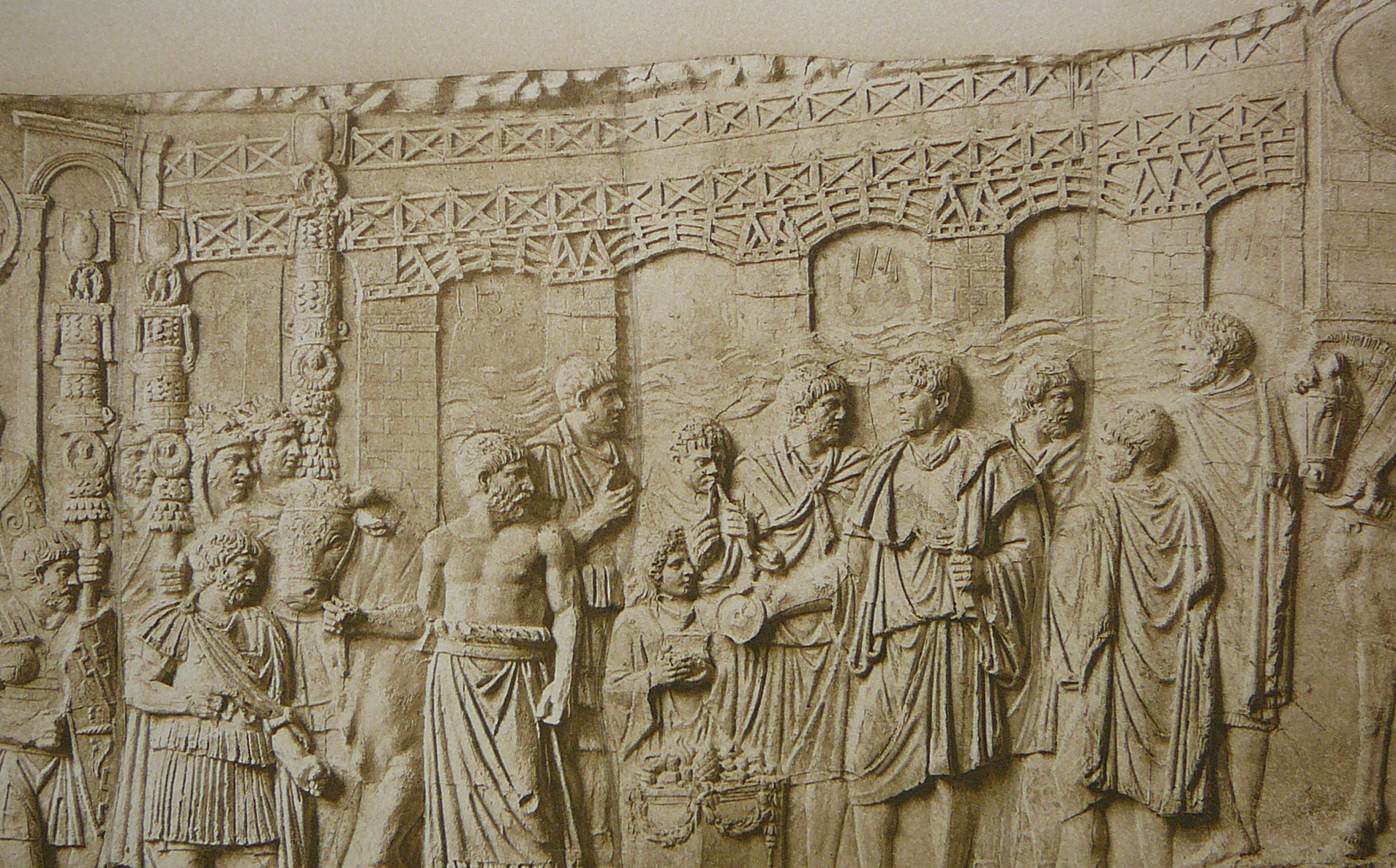
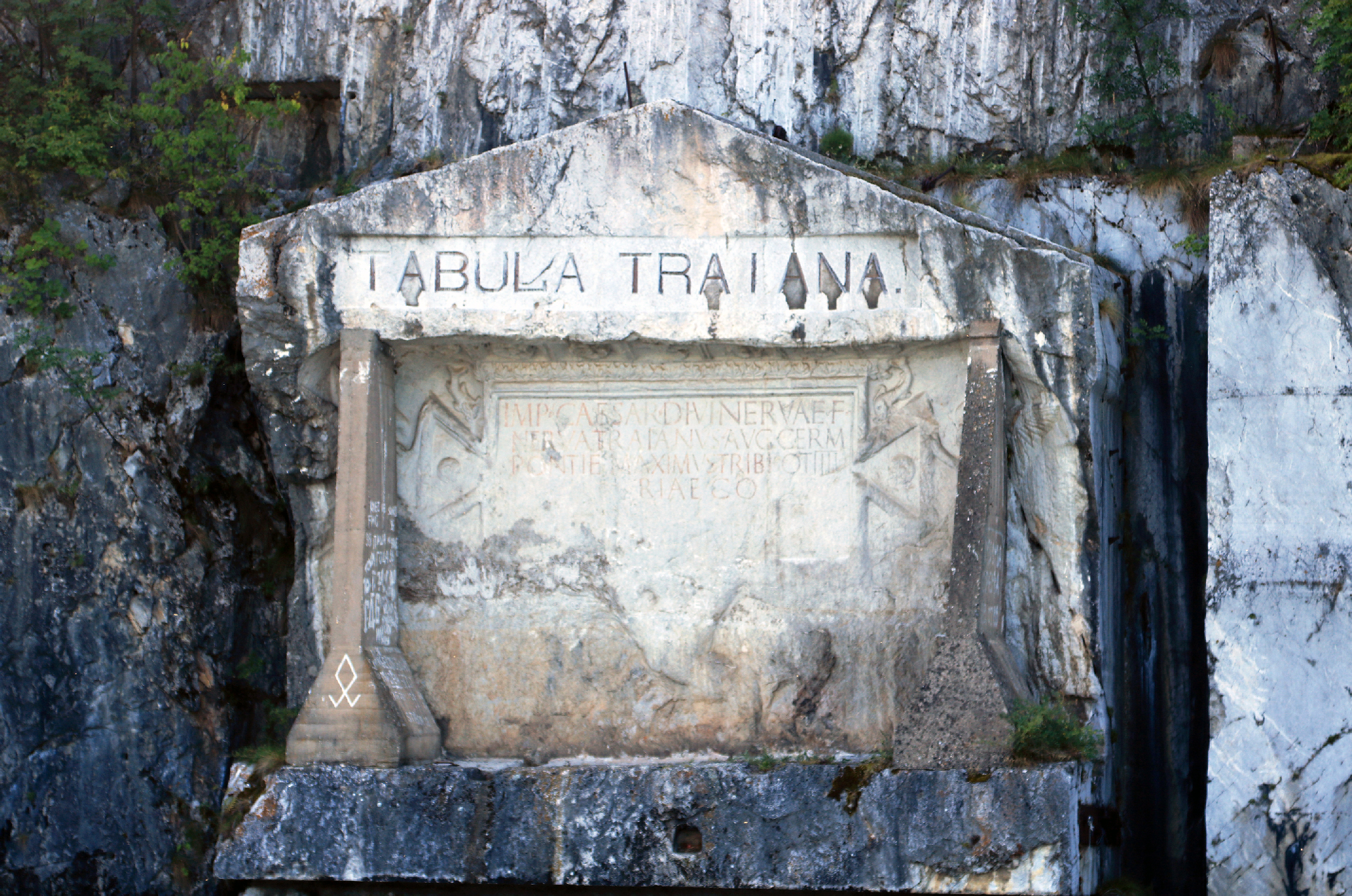
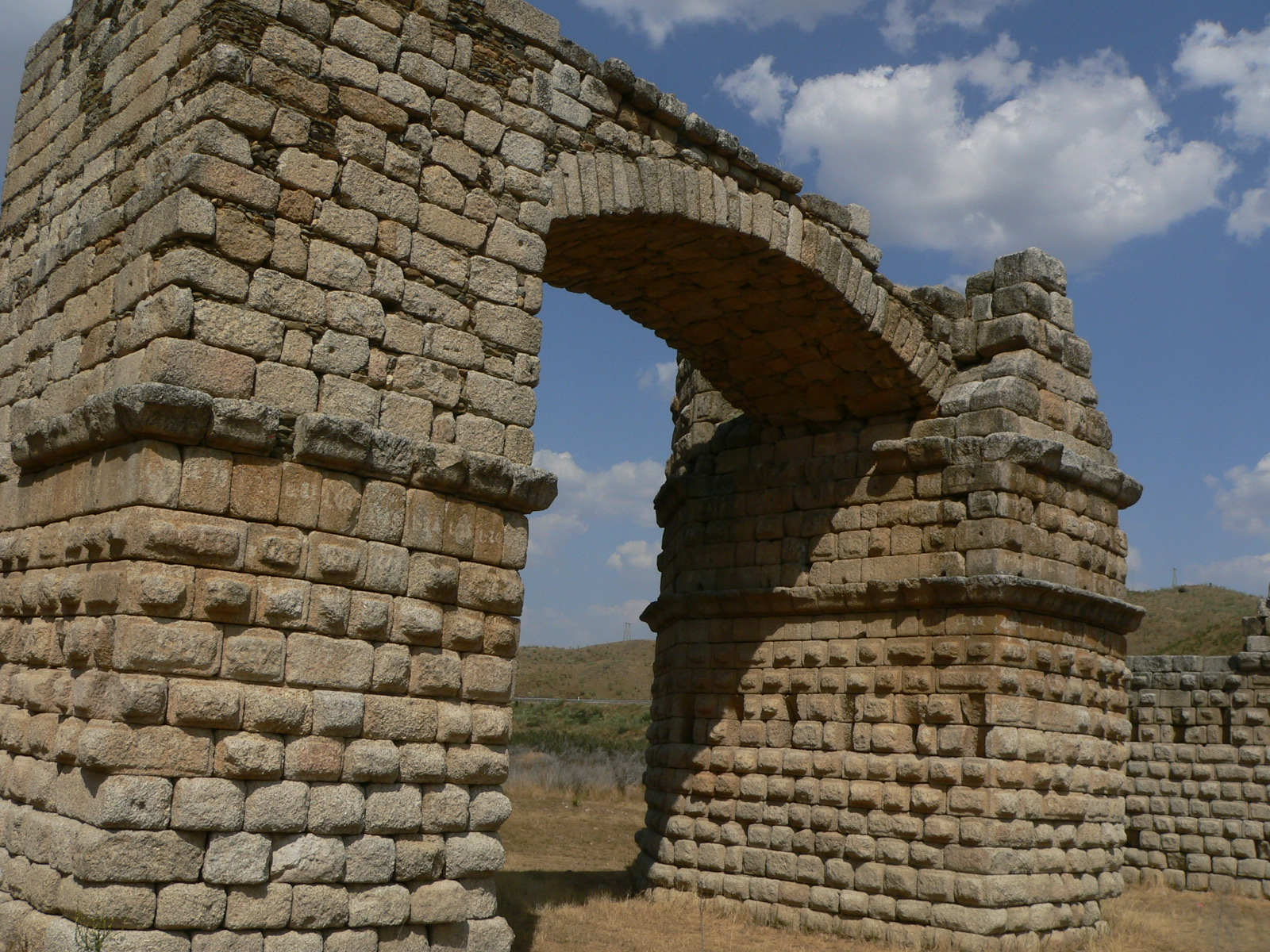
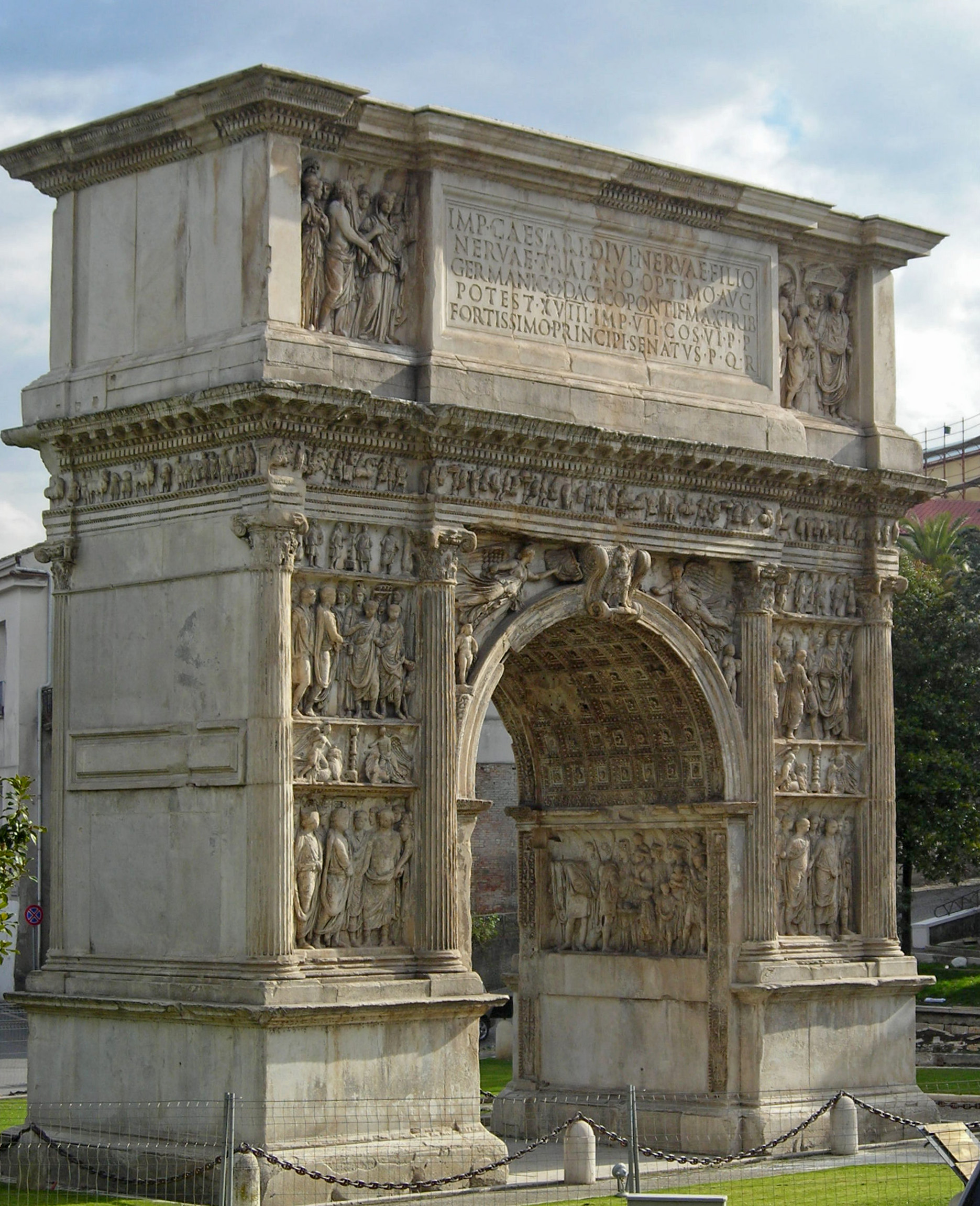
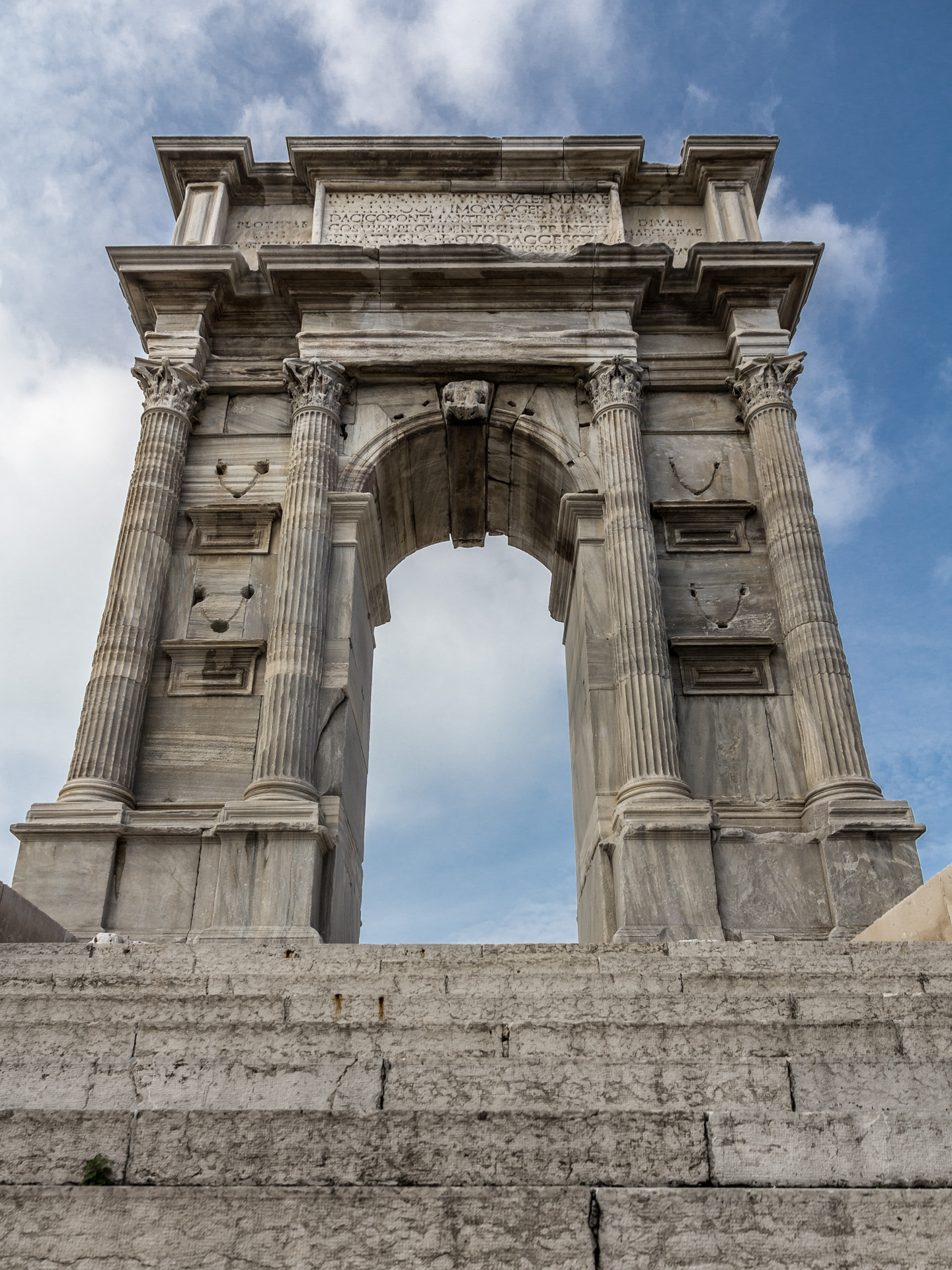
(counter-clockwise from top left) Apollodorus of Damascus (bust from 130/140 AD in the Glyptothek), Arch no. 3 of the Alconétar Bridge (the right pier, no. 3, preserves the sloping support for the Roman segmental arch), arch of Trajan, the Arch of Trajan in Ancona, relocated Tabula Traiana, and depiction of the monumental Danube Bridge of Apollodorus on Trajan's Column. Apollodorus himself stands in the foreground behind the sacrificing emperor.

Apollodorus of Damascus was an architect and engineer from Damascus, Roman Syria, who flourished during the 2nd century AD. Ancient scholars and historians don't mention his origins, but modern sources refer to him as either Nabataean or as Greek (see article). His massive architectural output gained him immense popularity during his time. He is one of the few architects whose name survives from antiquity, and is credited with introducing several Eastern innovations to the Roman Imperial style, such as making the dome a standard. Apollodorus was Trajan's favored architect and engineer. He designed and oversaw the construction of the Forum, Markets, and Temple, and Column of Trajan (the first monument of its kind), and the Stadium of Domitian within the city of Rome. Outside the capital, Apollodorus built bridges across the Danube and the Tagus in Spain and designed the triumphal arches of Trajan at Benevento and Ancona. He is the author of Siege Engines (Πολιορκητικά), dedicated to an unnamed emperor, likely Trajan.

=== The stonemasons of Hegra ===
Nabataean architects and sculptors were in reality contractors, who negotiated the costs of specific tomb types and their decorations, adapting them to the financial possibilities of the customer. Tombs were therefore executed based on the desires and financial abilities of the customer (for more see below at Halaf'allahi). There were two main schools or workshops of stonemasons at Hegra and the trade was at least in some cases a family affair.

Wahb'allahi's family workshop/school

- Wahb'allahi - a first-century stonemason who worked in the city of Hegra. Wahb'allahi was the brother of the stonemason 'Abdharetat and the father of 'Abd'obodat. He is named in an inscription as the responsible stonemason on the oldest datable tomb in Hegra in the ninth year of the Nabataean king Aretas IV (1 BC/AD).
- 'Abd'obodat son of Wahballahi - a 1st-century stonemason who worked in the city of Hegra. He is named by inscriptions on five of the tomb facades typical of Hegra as the executing craftsman. On the basis of the inscriptions, four of the facades can be dated to the reigns of kings Aretas IV and Malichus II. 'Abd'obodat was evidently a successful craftsman. He succeeded his father Wahb'allahi and his uncle 'Abdharetat in at least one workshop in the second generation of Nabatean architects. 'Abd'obodat is considered to be the main representative of one of the two main schools of the Nabataean stonemasons, to which his father and his uncle belonged. Two more tomb facades are assigned to the school on the basis of stylistic investigations; 'Abd'obodat is probably to be regarded as the stonemason who carried out the work.

'Aftah workshop/school

- 'Aftah - a stonemason who became prominent in the beginning of the third decade of the first century. 'Aftah is attested in inscriptions on eight of the tomb facades in Hegra and one tomb as the executing stonemason. The facades are dated to the late reign of King Aretas IV. On one of the facades he worked with Halaf'allahi, on another with Wahbu and Huru. A tenth facade without an inscription was attributed to the 'Aftah sculpture school due to technical and stylistic similarities. He is the main representative of one of the two stonemason schools in the city of Hegra.
- Halaf'allahi - a first-century stonemason who worked in the city of Hegra. Halaf'allahi is named in inscriptions on two tombs there as the responsible stonemason in the reign of King Aretas IV. The first tomb, which can be dated to the year 26-27 CE, was created together with the stonemason 'Aftah. He is therefore assigned to the workshop of 'Aftah. Nabataean architects and sculptors were contractors, who negotiated the costs of specific tomb types and their decorations. Tombs were therefore executed based on the desires and financial abilities of their owners. The activities of Halaf'allahi offer an excellent example of this, as he had been commissioned with the execution of a simple tomb for a person who apparently belonged to the lower middle class, but he was also in charge of completing a more sophisticated tomb for one of the local military officials.

== Conservation ==
Petra is a site at the intersection of natural and cultural heritage forming a unique cultural landscape. Ever since Johann Ludwig Burckhardt aka Sheikh Ibrahim had rediscovered the ruin city in Petra, Jordan, in 1812, the cultural heritage site has attracted different people who shared an interest in the ancient history and culture of the Nabataeans such as travellers, pilgrims, painters and savants. However, it was not until the late 19th century that the ruins were systematically approached by archaeological researchers. Since then regular archaeological excavations and ongoing research on the Nabataean culture have been part of today's UNESCO world cultural heritage site Petra. Through the excavations in the Petra Archaeological Park an increasing number of Nabataean cultural heritage is being exposed to environmental impact. A central issue is the management of water impacting the built heritage and the rock hewn facades. The large number of discoveries and the exposure of structures and findings demand conservation measures respecting the interlinkage between the natural landscape and cultural heritage, as especially this connection is a central challenge at the UNECSO World Heritage Site.

=== Conservation of cultural heritage ===
In recent years different conservation campaigns and projects were established at the cultural heritage site of Petra. The main works first focussed on the entrance situation of the Siq to protect tourists and to facilitate access. Also, different projects for conservation and conservation research were conducted. Following is a list of projects, to be continued.

- 1958 Restoration of the third pillar of the Treasury building (Al-Khazneh). This project was funded by the United States Agency for International Development (USAID)
- 1974–1990 Conservation work in the excavated area of the Winged Lions Temple
- 1981 Different restoration works by the Department of Antiquities of Jordan
- 1985 Restoration works at the Qasr El Bint Temple by the Department of Antiquities of Jordan
- 1990–1998 Excavation and Conservation of the Byzantine Church by the American Centre of Research (ACOR)
- 1992–2002 Conservation and Restoration Center in Petra CARCIP, German GTZ Project.
- 1993–2000 Excavation, conservation and restoration of the Great Temple, funded by the Brown University, USA.
- 1996 onwards, Restoration of the Siq and rehabilitation of the Siq floor by the Petra National Trust founded by the Jordanian-Swiss counterpart Fund, the Swiss Agency for Development and the World Monuments Fund.
- 2001 Restoration of the altar in front of the Casr Bint Firaun by UNESCO
- 2003 Development of a conservation and maintenance plan of the ancient drainage systems to protect the rock-cut facades
- 2003–2017 Evaluation of desalination and restoration at the tomb facades
- 2006–2010 Preservation and consolidation of the Wall Paintings in Siq al Barid by the Petra National Trust in cooperation with the Department of Antiquities of Jordan and the Courtauld Institute of Art (London).
- 2009 onwards, renewed effort to preserve and rehabilitate the Winged Lions Temple by The Temple of the Winged Lions Cultural Management (TWLCRM) Initiative, the Petra Archaeological Park (PAP) and the Department of Antiquities of Jordan
- 2016–2019 Characterisation and Conservation of Paintings on Walls and Sculpture from Nabataean Petra "The Petra Painting Conservation Project (PPCP)", funded by the German Research Foundation (Project number 285789434).

== Archeological sites ==
=== Syria (south) ===
- Bosra

=== Jordan ===
- Petra and Little Petra

=== Israel, Negev Desert ===
Nabataean road stations, today in the Negev Desert in Israel:

- Avdat (Obodas), precursor to a Byzantine colony
- Haluza (Elusa)
- Mamshit (Mampsis)
- Shivta (Sobota)

=== Saudi Arabia (northwest) ===
In northwest Saudi Arabia:

- Mada'in Saleh
- Mugha'ir Shu'ayb ("Caves of Shuayb/Jethro") aka/at al-Bad'/el-Bed' archaeological site in Tabuk Province

=== Egypt, Sinai Peninsula ===
In the Sinai Peninsula, Egypt:

- Dahab in southern Sinai; an excavated Nabataean trading port

== See also ==
- Nabataean art
- Nabatean kingdom
- Nabatean religion
- Arab culture
- History of the Arabs
