= Israeli wine =

Overview of wine production in Israel

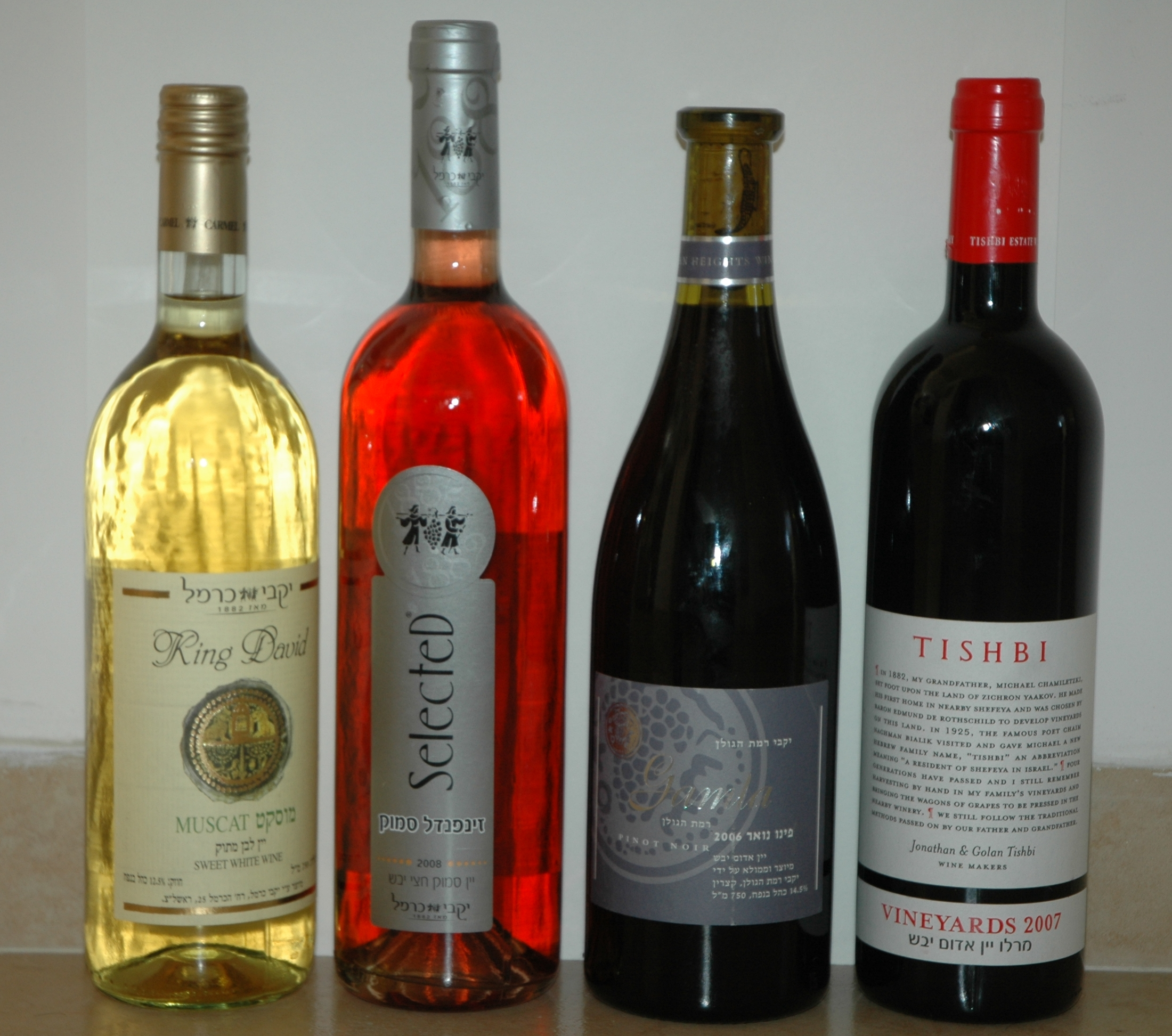
Israeli wines

Israeli wine is produced by hundreds of wineries, ranging in size from small boutique enterprises to large companies producing over ten million bottles per year.

Wine has been produced in the Land of Israel since biblical times. Wine was exported to Rome during the Roman period, but under the Muslim rulers the production was virtually wiped out. Under the Crusaders, winemaking was temporarily revived.

The modern Israeli wine industry was founded by Baron Edmond James de Rothschild, owner of the Bordeaux estate Château Lafite-Rothschild. Today, Israeli winemaking takes place in five vine-growing regions: Galil (Galilee, including the Golan Heights), the region most suited for viticulture due to its high elevation, cool breezes, marked day and night temperature changes and rich, well-drained soils; the Judean Hills, surrounding the city of Jerusalem; Shimshon (Samson), located between the Judean Hills and the Coastal Plain; the Negev, a semi-arid desert region, where drip irrigation has made grape growing possible; and the Sharon plain near the Mediterranean coast and just south of Haifa, surrounding the towns of Zichron Ya'akov and Binyamina, which is the largest grape growing area in Israel.

In 2011, Israeli wine exports totaled over $26.7 million. As of 2012, Israel had 5,000 hectares (12,355 acres) of vineyards.

== History ==
=== Ancient and Classic era ===
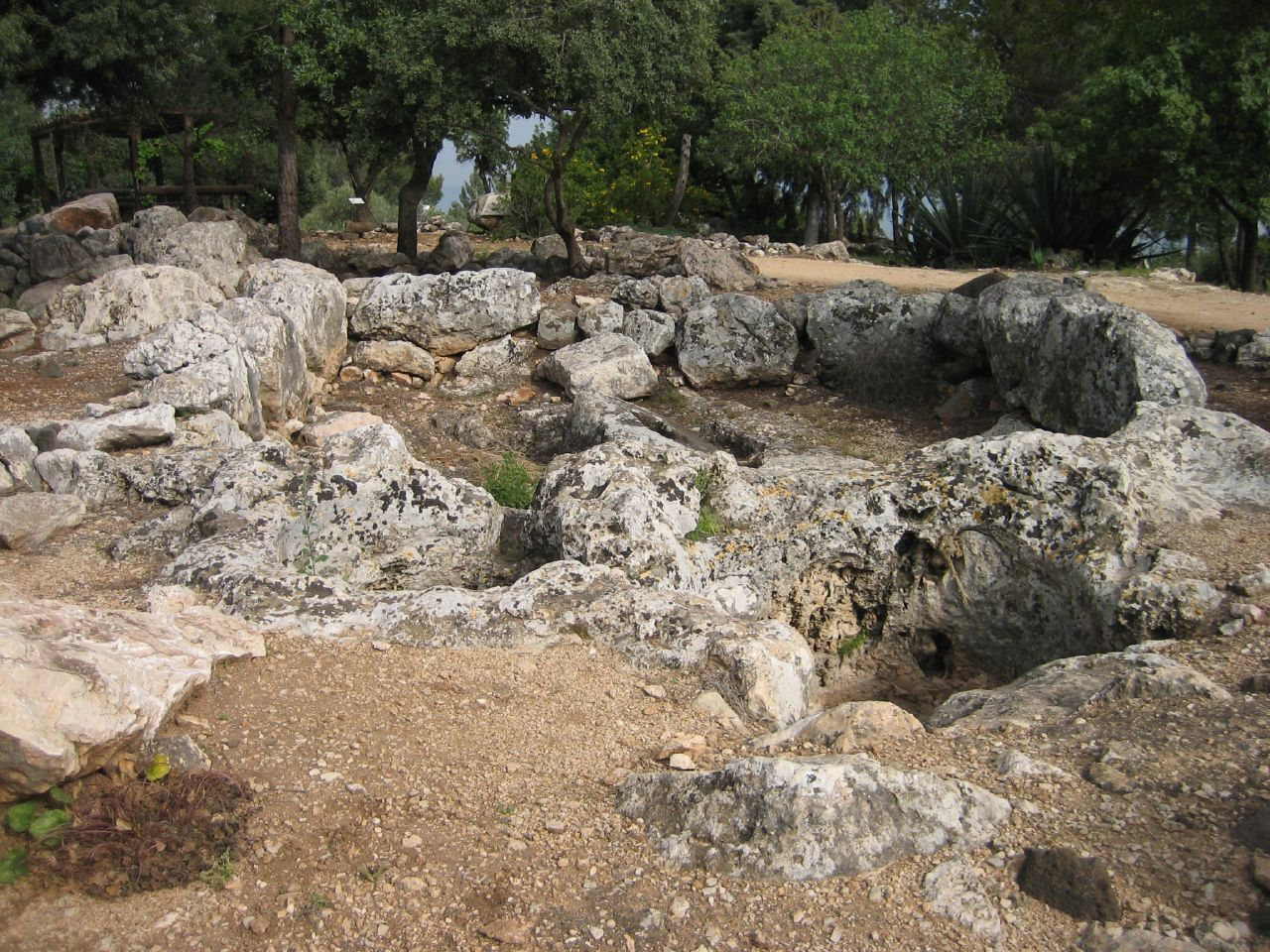
Ruins of an ancient Israeli wine press dating to the Talmudic period (100–400 CE)

Viticulture has existed in the land of Israel since biblical times. In the book of Deuteronomy, the fruit of the vine was listed as one of the seven blessed species of fruit found in the land of Israel(Deut. 8:8). The location of Israel along a historic wine trading route between Mesopotamia and Egypt brought winemaking knowledge and influence to the area. Wine played a significant role in the religion of the early Israelites with images of grape growing, harvesting and winemaking often being used to illustrate religious ideals. In Roman times, wine from Israel was exported to Rome with the most sought after wines being vintage, dated with the name of the winemaker inscribed on the amphora.

=== Middle Ages ===
Winemaking, limited under Islamic rule, was temporarily revived in the Crusader states from around 1100 to 1300 but the return of Islamic rule and the subsequent Jewish Diaspora extinguished the industry once again.

=== Modern ===
==== Ottoman and British periods ====
In 1848, a rabbi in Jerusalem founded the first documented winery in modern times but this establishment was short lived. In 1870, the first Jewish agricultural college, Mikveh Israel, was founded and featured a course on viticulture. The root of the modern Israeli wine industry can be traced to the late 19th century when the French Baron Edmond de Rothschild, owner of the Bordeaux estate Château Lafite-Rothschild, began importing French grape varieties and technical know how to the region. In 1882, he helped establish Carmel Winery with vineyards and wine production facilities in Rishon LeZion and Zikhron Ya'akov near Haifa. Still in operation today, Carmel is the largest producer of Israeli wine and has been at the forefront of many technical and historical advances in both winemaking and Israeli history.

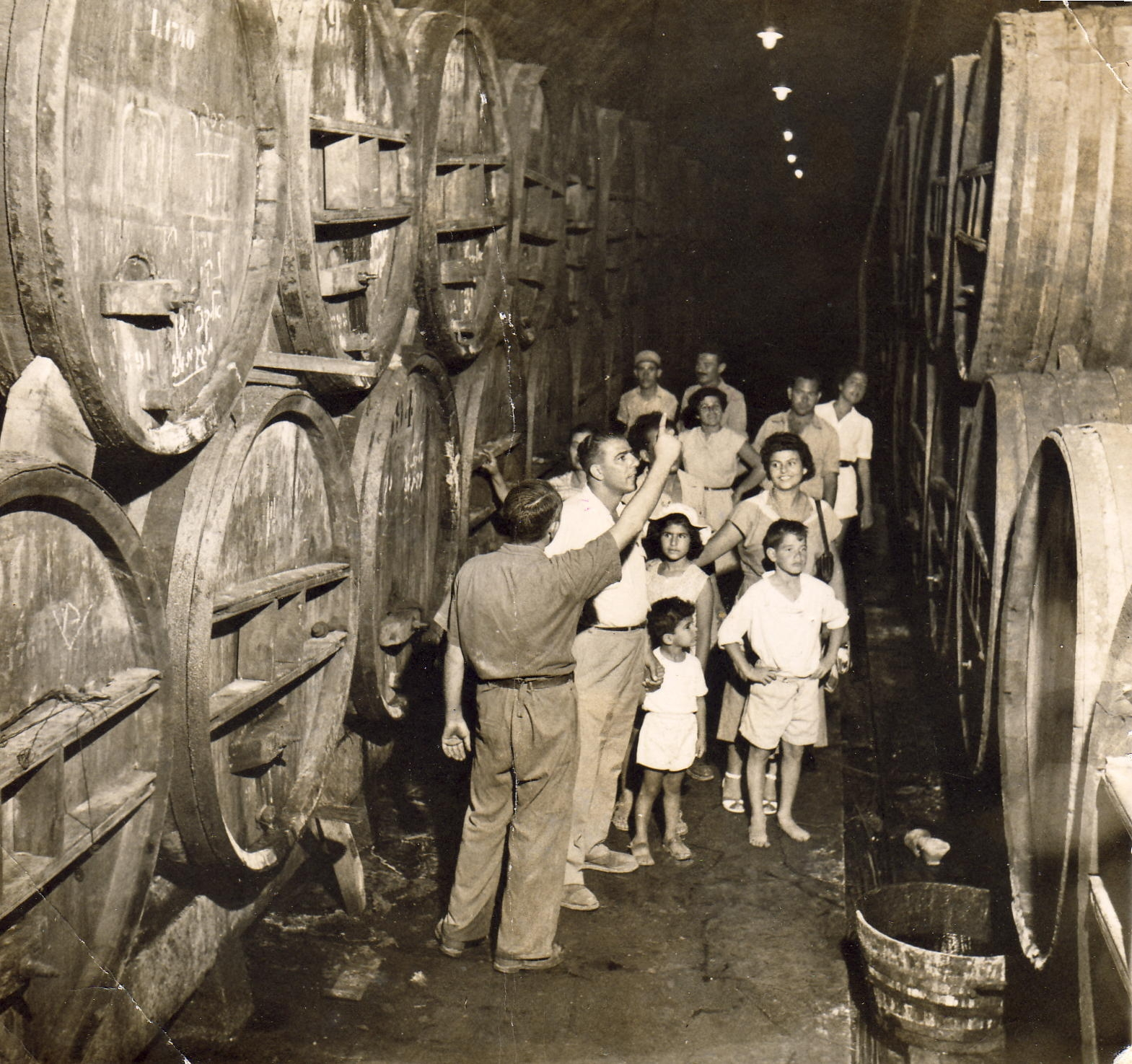
Zichron Yaakov winery, 1945

One of the first telephones in Israel was installed at Carmel and the country's first Prime Minister, David Ben-Gurion, worked in Carmel's cellars in his youth.

==== After Israeli independence ====
For most of its history in the modern era, the Israeli wine industry was based predominantly on the production of Kosher wines which were exported worldwide to Jewish communities. The quality of these wines were varied, with many being produced from high-yielding vineyards that valued quantity over quality. Many of these wines were also somewhat sweet. Today's wine production in Israel comes from grape varieties traced to French varieties. In the late 1960s, Carmel Winery was the first Israeli winery to make a dry table wine. It was not until the 1980s that the industry at large saw a revival in quality winemaking, when an influx of winemaking talent from Australia, California and France brought modern technology and technical know-how to the growing Israeli wine industry. In 1989, the first boutique winery in Israel, Margalit Winery, was founded. By the 1990s, Israeli estates such as Golan Heights Winery and Domaine du Castel were winning awards at international wine competitions. The 1990s saw a subsequent "boom" in the opening of boutique wineries. By 2000 there 70 wineries in Israel, and by 2005 that numbered jumped to 140.

Today, less than 15% of Israeli wine is produced for sacramental purposes. The three largest producers—Carmel Winery, Barkan Wine Cellars and Golan Heights Winery—account for more than 80% of the domestic market. The United States is the largest export destination. Even though it contains only around one-quarter of the planted acreage as Lebanon, Israel has emerged as a driving force for winemaking in the Eastern Mediterranean, due to its willingness to adopt new technology and its large export market. The country has also seen the emergence of a modern wine culture with upscale restaurants featuring international wines dedicated to an ever-increasing wine-conscious clientele.

== Climate and geography ==
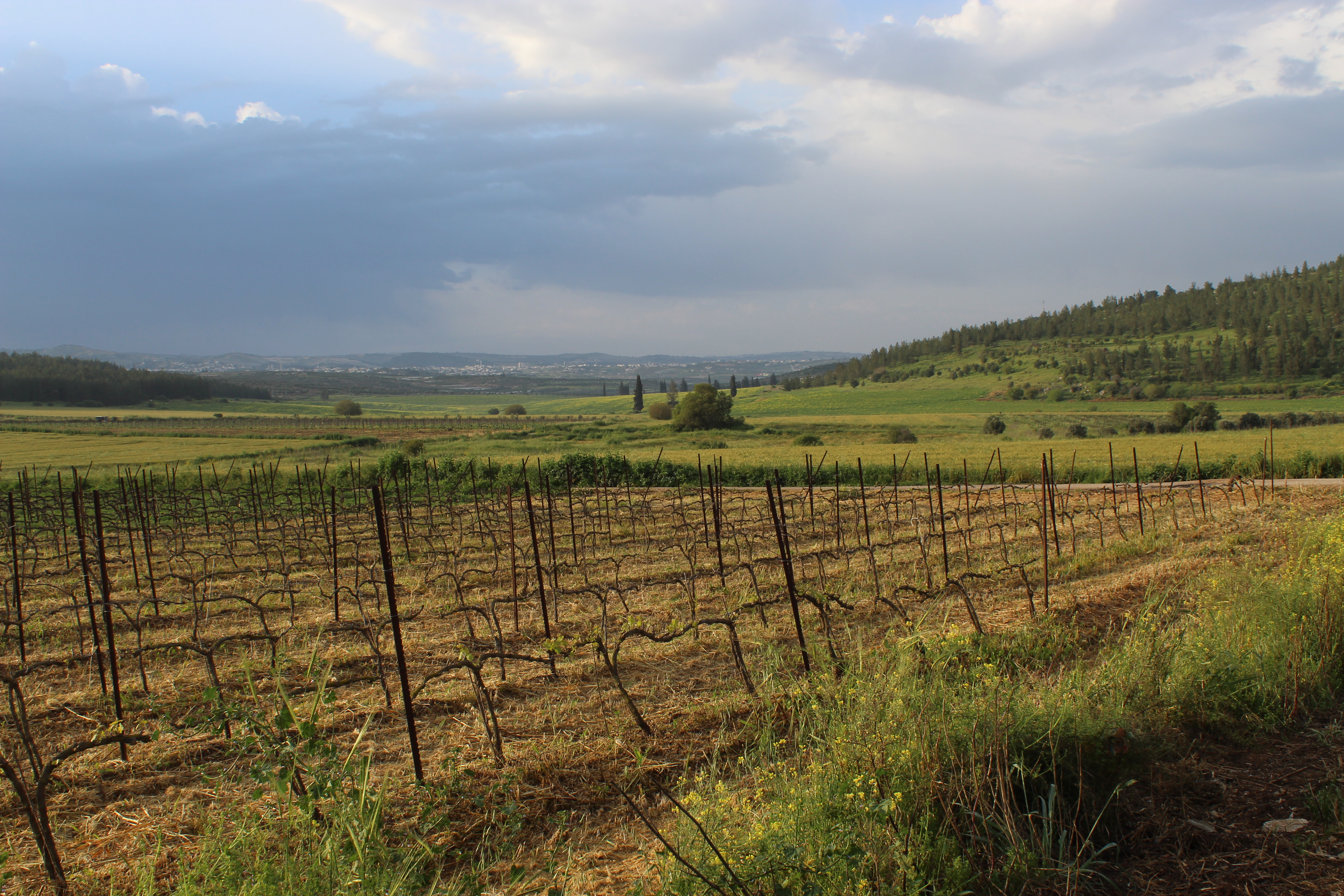
Vineyard in the Elah Valley of Israel

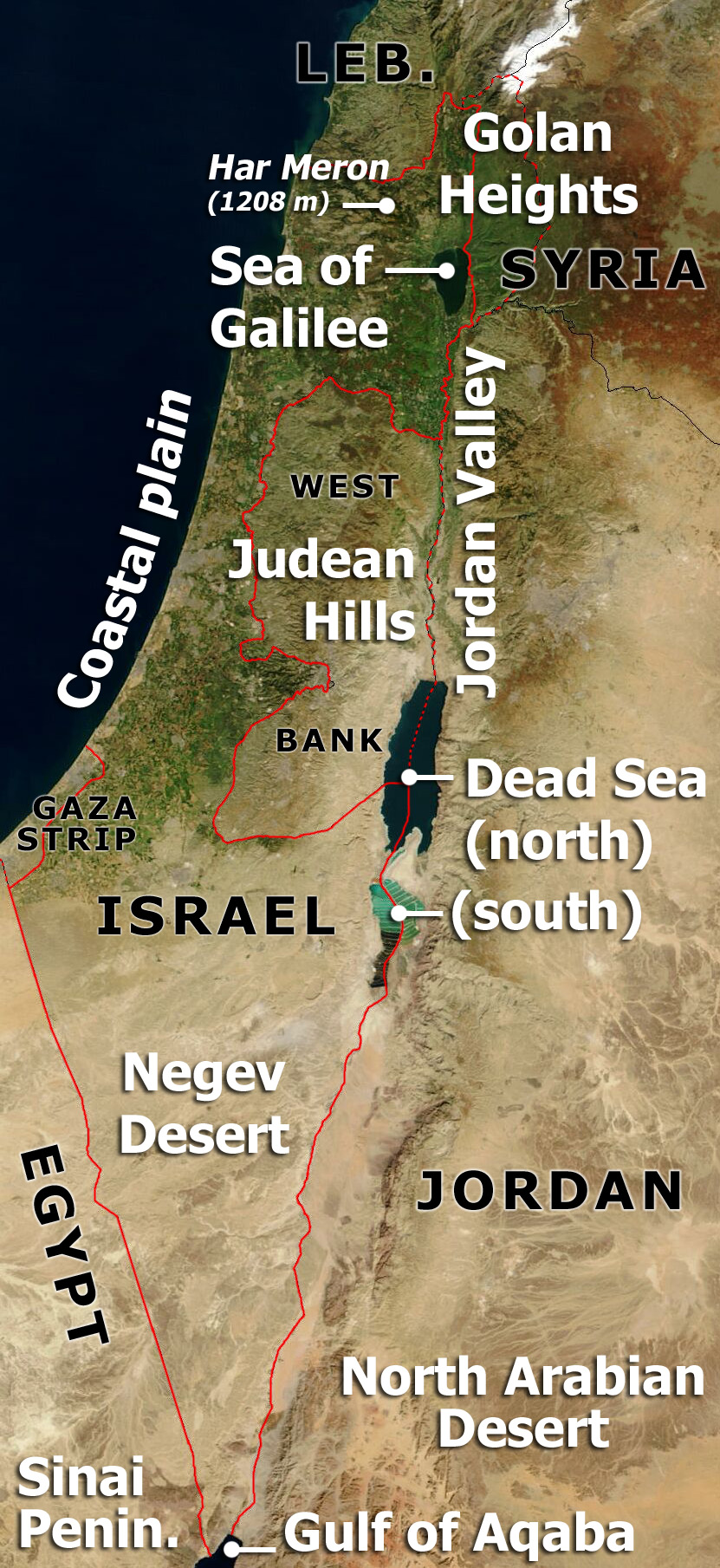

Israel has a distinctly Mediterranean climate, with the country located along roughly the same latitude as San Diego and the Mexico – United States border. There are two primary seasons - a hot, humid summer season running from April to October with very little precipitation and a cold, rainy winter season from late October to March. During winter, average precipitation is around 20 inches (50 cm) with some areas seeing as much as 35 inches (90 cm) annually. Some vineyards in the higher elevation regions of Golan Heights can see snow in the winter months. With a dry growing season, drip irrigation is essential to sustaining viticulture. Vineyard managers will utilize pruning and canopy management techniques to maximize shade production from the sunlight. Harvest will often take place during the cooler temperatures of night time. The dryness of the growing seasons serves a protective barrier to many grape diseases that thrive in damp weather and allows vineyard managers to control vigor and yields with by irrigation.

Israel is roughly equal in size to the state of New Jersey and is bordered by Lebanon and Syria to the north/northeast, the Mediterranean Sea to the west, the deserts leading to the border with Egypt to the southwest, the Jordan River and Dead Sea region along with the border to Jordan comprise the country's eastern boundaries. Vines are grown throughout the country ranging from the mountain ranges along the Lebanon, Syria borders down to Beersheba and Arad in the south. Small plantings are also found on the Mizpe Ramon plateau and at Neot Smadar in the desert north of Eilat. The vast majority of Israeli winemaking takes place in the more temperate northern climate: Galilee, Sharon Plain, Samson, Golan Heights, and the Judean foothills in the West Bank.

Across Israel there is a wide range of microclimates due to differing soil types and topography. Most areas have limestone based soils with layers of marl and hard dolomites. The color of the soils range from red terra rosa in Judea and Galilee near Mount Tabor to gray in the mountain ranges stretching from Mount Carmel to Zikhron Ya'akov. Marine sediments are found in the loam soils of the coastal plains and at the base of the elevated foothills around Binyamina-Giv'at Ada and Latroun. The Golan Heights and parts of the Upper and Lower Galilee regions have significant layers of basalt deposits of clay and tuff created by centuries of volcanic activity and lava flows. Wind blown sediment deposits help create the loess based and alluvial sand soils of the Negev area.

== Israel as a wine region ==
After many years where in Israel the wine industry was almost non-existent, the past twenty years herald a change in path. In the late eighties there were only a couple of wineries in Israel, making mostly boiled wines for sacramental use. That is part of the reason why wines from Israel are mistakenly considered to be boiled wines and Israel is not yet considered and recognized to be a wine region as many other countries are. Over the last twenty years, the Israeli wine industry has grown tremendously and today there are around 300 wineries of different sizes in all areas of Israel.

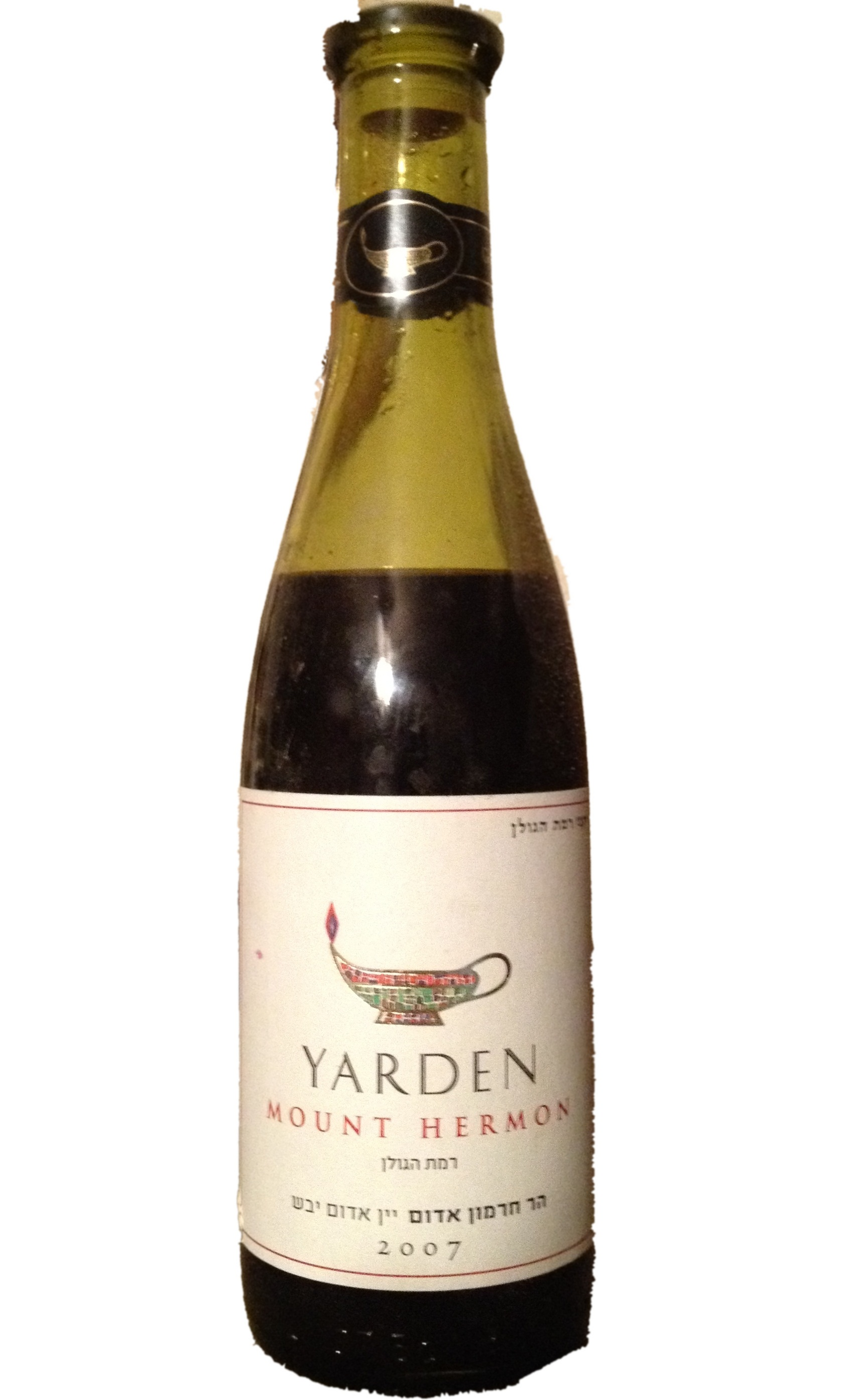
Yarden wine from Israel's vineyards on Mount Hermon

Israeli wine is produced in five regions: Galilee (which includes the sub-regions of the Golan Heights, Upper Galilee and Lower Galilee); the Samson region, located between the southern West Bank and the Coastal Plain; the Negev desert region; the West Bank, and the Sharon plain located near the Mediterranean coast and just south of Haifa. As of 2012, Israel has 50,000 dunams of vineyards. More than 80% of the vineyards planted in Israel are located in the southern West Bank, Samson and Galilee regions.

The Golan contains some of the highest elevated vineyards in Israel, with vineyard planted upwards of 4,000 feet (1,200 metres) from the Sea of Galilee towards Mount Hermon. There are seven Israeli wineries in the Golan Heights that cultivate a total of 1,600 acres (647 ha). These include four boutiques, and Château Golan, Bazelet Hagolan, and the Golan Heights Winery whose Yarden, Gamla/Gilgal, Harmon, and Golan labels enjoy international renown.

== Grape varieties ==
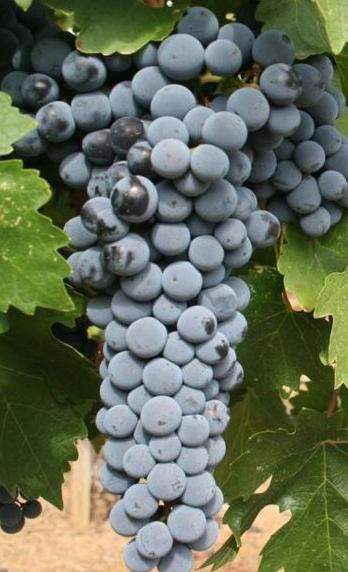
Cabernet Sauvignon

During centuries of Islamic rule, alcohol production was banned as part of the Islamic dietary laws. Ancient vineyards that were cultivated in the country under Muslim rule were not used to produce wine, but strictly for food production. The Arab geographer al-Muqaddasi wrote in 985 that, in his day, the best raisins in Palestine came from the species known as ʻAinūnī and Durī, prepared from grapes that grew in Bayt ʻAinūn and Dura, places lying respectively to the northeast and southwest of Hebron. In the mid- and late 19th century, the names of the varieties of grapes grown by Arab husbandmen included names such as Hebroni, Dabouki, Marawi (also known as Hamdani), Halbani, Sharwishi, Jandali amongst the whites and Zeitani, Karkashani, Razaki, Karashi, Balouti (Baladi) and Bituni amongst the reds. Most were grown in the Bethlehem or Hebron areas primarily by Arabs and the names reflect their Arab origins. These varieties were sold to the few Jewish wineries that existed at that time. Today, the wine industry produces primarily French grape varieties imported during the late 19th century. The most widely planted varieties include Cabernet Sauvignon, Chardonnay, Merlot and Sauvignon blanc. Emerging varieties that have recently been increasing in popularity include Cabernet Franc, Gewurztraminer, Muscat Canelli, Riesling and Syrah. Other varieties planted to some significant degree include Emerald Riesling, Muscat of Alexandria and the crossing Argaman.

A primary concern in Israeli wine production is maintaining acid levels to balance the naturally high sugars that the warm climate of the region produces. Vineyards at higher elevations, as opposed to the lower coastal plains, have more consistently produced wines with the necessary acid balance. Cabernet Sauvignon has shown the greatest aging potential thus far. The smooth texture and ripe tannins of Israeli Merlot has increased that wine's popularity in the market. Chardonnay grown in Israel has shown itself to be highly reflective of terroir and reflective of the particular characteristics of vineyard soils. It is also the primary grape used in Israeli sparkling wine production made according to the methode champenoise.

== Production figures and consumption ==
As of 2012, the Israeli wine industry produced an average of 36 million bottles of wine annually in a variety of styles ranging from red, white, rosé, still, sparkling and dessert wines. There are 35 commercial wineries in Israel, and over 250 boutique wineries. The 10 largest wineries in Israel, in terms of production volume, are Carmel, Barkan, Golan Heights, Teperberg 1870, Binyamina Wine Cellar, Galil Mountain, Tishbi Winery, Tabor, Recanati and Dalton Winery. The industry is fairly concentrated, with 75% of the nationwide production coming from the top 5 producers.

Annual wine consumption among Israelis averages 4.6 liters of wine per person.

== Enotourism ==
It was announced in early 2008 that a 150-acre (0.61 km^{2}) wine park would be created on the slopes between Zichron Ya'akov and Binyamina in order to promote tourism in the area and enotourism in Israel in general.

Another center of enotourism in Israel is the Ramat Dalton Industrial Park, a green industrial park located near Dalton and Kerem Ben Zimra in the Upper Galilee. As of 2024, the park hosts seven wineries: Adir, Dalton, Feldstein, Luria, Recanati, Rimon (Northern Lake Winery), and Kamisa. The area also supports agritourism, providing various guesthouses (tzimmers) for accommodation.

Hamas terrorists killed vintner Gideon Pauker in the 2023 Nir Oz attack. In 2025 his grandson opened the Pauker Winery to visitors, making available Pauker's 2022 Nir Oz Red. A 2025 Times of Israel story on the Galai Winery, part of the fifty-member Negev Wine Consortium, reported that tourists were "slowly returning" to the winery and its restaurant after the October 7 attacks.

== Assessment by wine critics ==
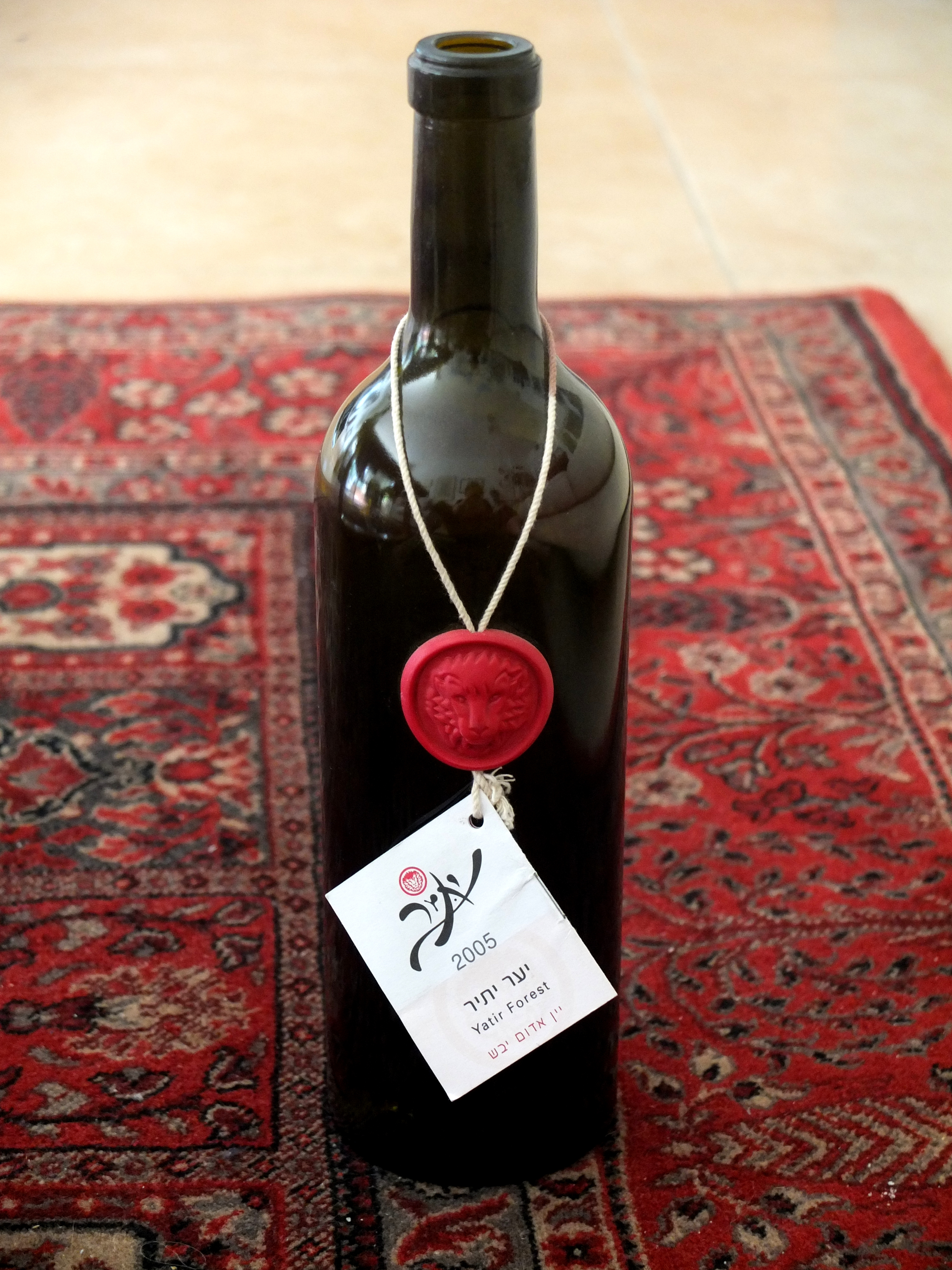
Bottle of Yatir Forest, 2005

Annually from 2005 to 2012 Daniel Rogov, Israel's leading wine critic and Food & Wine Critic for Haaretz, ranked Israeli wines in his Rogov's Guide to Israeli Wines. In the 2012 edition, Rogov describes, sorts and ranks more than 2500 wines from over 150 Israeli wineries.

Today Israeli wineries receive recognition from the worldwide wine industry as they are highly rated and win the most important wine awards. One of the first accomplishments by an Israeli winery in the global world of wines was made by Domaine du Castel when their white wine was chosen as one of the best new releases in 2001. In 2012, Golan Heights winery received a Wine Star award from Wine Enthusiast magazine. The Golan Heights winery has also won the Gran Vinitaly Special Award as the best wine producer title in Vinitaly competition of 2011.

The wine advocate Robert Parker has been rating Israel's wines for more than five years now, when many Israeli wines received a score of more than 90. Yatir Forest wine by Yatir winery scored above 90 points for seven consecutive vintages, the same was achieved by Domaine du Castel's Grand Vin wine. The Cabernet reserve of Flam winery of the Judean Hills, was included in the French La Revue Du Vin France magazine list of 100 outstanding wines.

Galil Mountain winery won two awards in the Citadelles du Vin 2011 competition which was held at the Vinexpo 2011 in France. In Hugh Johnson's wine pocket book, written by the British important wine critic, Domaine du Castel winery received the full 4 stars and Yatir winery 3-4 stars, the highest rating available, since 2008. Hugh Johnson has also selected Domaine du Castel's Grand Vin wine to be one of his personal 200 favorite wines from all around the world.

Israel's reds, whites and rosés also have been praised by Robert Parker and Oz Clarke. When Parker first reviewed Israeli wines in 2007, he awarded 14 of them more than 90 out of a maximum 100 points, rating them world-class. Clarke included two Israeli wineries, Domaine du Castel and Yatir Winery, in his Pocket Wine Book 2010. Kim Marcus, managing editor of Wine Spectator magazine, was not impressed by Israel's wineries in the 1990s, but in 2008, he wrote that quality had improved immensely, especially the red wines.

== Manufacturers by certification ==
=== Kosher wine ===
To be considered kosher, a wine may only be handled by observant Jews from the time the grapes are crushed. If, however, the wine is boiled or pasteurized, it may subsequently be handled by anyone without losing its kosher status. Additionally, kosher wine cannot contain any non-kosher ingredients or fining agents such as isinglass, gelatin or casein. Although not all Israeli wine is kosher, virtually all of the large producers in Israel have kosher certification.

=== Arab Christian wine manufacturers (non-Kosher) ===
There are at least two Israeli Arab wine producers, both Christians. They run respectively the Ashkar winery near the border with Lebanon and the Jascala winery. The winery in Kafr Yasif is run by descendants of the Christian villagers of Iqrit. The Jascala winery is based in Jish. The wine is non-kosher and the producers cater both to Arab restaurants in places like Nazareth, Haifa, Ramallah, Jerusalem and Acre, and to non-Kosher restaurants in Tel Aviv. The Israeli chef Yotam Ottolenghi is reputedly one of their clients.

== Export problems ==
Several wines such as the one coming from the "Judean Hills" and the Golan Heights, may actually refer to areas that are Israeli-occupied territories., which is a subject of legal contention abroad.

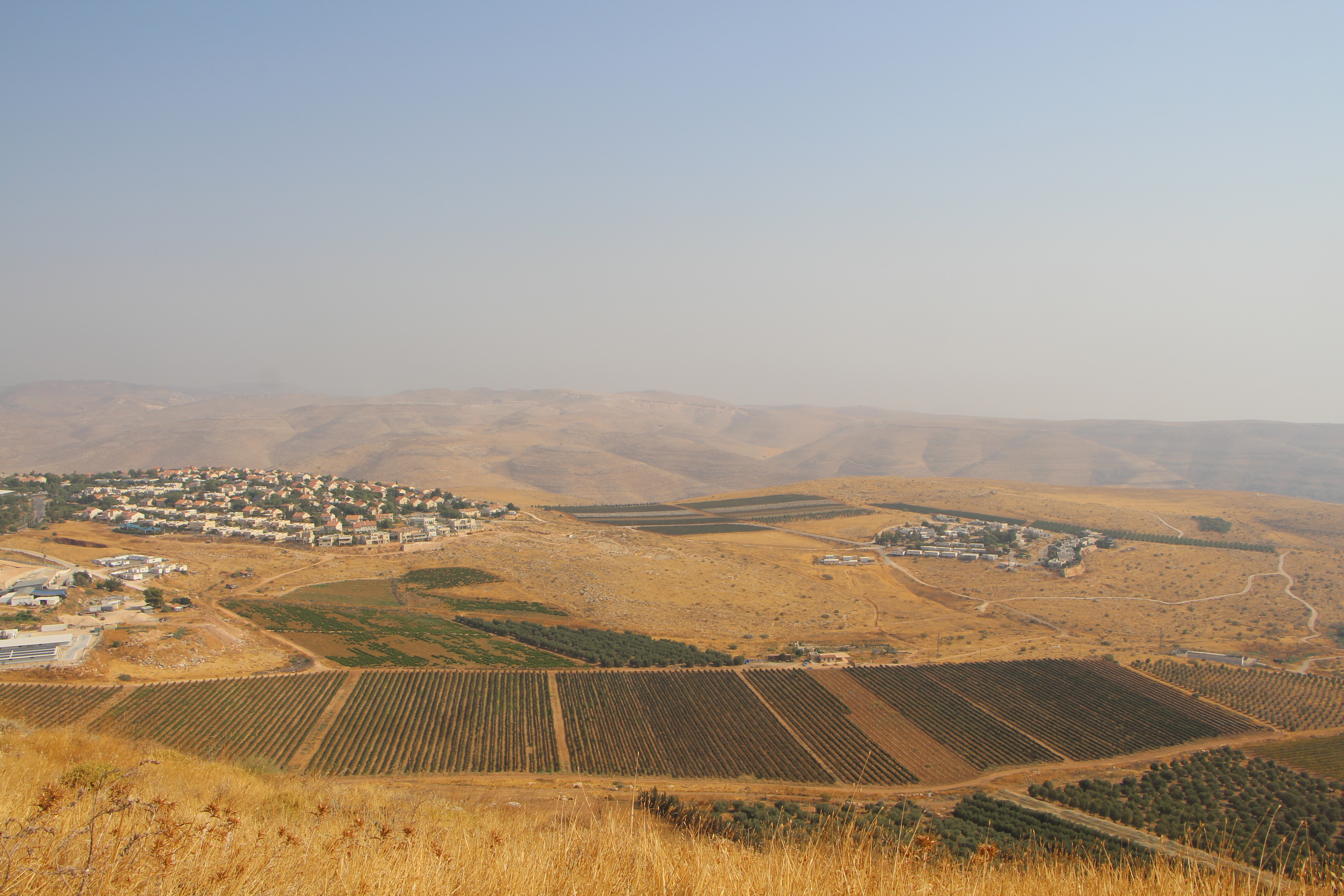
Vinyard of the Israeli settlement of Kokhav HaShahar, in the occupied West Bank.

In a 2011 report drawn up by the Coalition of Women for Peace, the researchers concluded that all major Israeli wineries use grapes harvested from the occupied territories of the Golan Heights and the West Bank. Taking advantage of tax breaks, Israel's largest producer, Barkan Wine Cellars, which grew out of an old winery in Petah Tikva established a plant in the West Bank's Barkan Industrial Park. By 2011 it was estimated that the West Bank had 29 wineries run by Israeli entrepreneurs, as opposed to 14 in the Golan Heights. One of the largest of the West Bank operations is in the area circumscribed by the settlements of Shilo, Eli, Rechlim and Ma'ale Levona, on land owned or claimed by Palestinians. In the case of the Yatir winery, technically it is located within Israel's recognized boundaries, but the grapes are grown in West Bank settlements across the divide such as Beit Yatir, Carmel, Ma'on and Susya.

In November 2015 the European Union determined that settlement products could not use the label "Made in Israel". In July 2019 the Federal Court of Canada, following up on a complaint of false labelling made by David Kattenberg, a son of Holocaust survivors, ruled that characterizing wines produced in Israeli settlements as 'Israeli' was "false, misleading and deceptive." Kattenberg's original complaint had been accepted by the Canadian Food Inspection Agency (CFIA), only to be overruled within hours, with the CFIA affirming that the Canada–Israel Free Trade Agreement (CIFTA) overrode domestic consumer protection laws.

The Golan Heights, occupied by Israel since the Six-Day War in 1967, are located northeast of Israel proper, though Israel considers it a sub-region of the Galilee. The legal status in international law of the Golan Heights has resulted in controversy on the export market. In one example, following domestic demand for kosher wine, a number of Golan Heights wines were marketed by Systembolaget, Sweden's state-owned monopoly alcohol retailer, as "Made in Israel" on shelves and in the sales catalogue. Following customer complaints and consultation with Sweden's foreign ministry, Systembolaget changed the shelf labelling to read, "Made in Israeli-occupied Syrian territories." However this prompted further complaints, from some customers and a Member of Parliament. Systembolaget's solution was to simply remove all reference to the product's country of origin on shelves and in catalogues, classifying the wine as of "other origins." The actual bottles remained unchanged throughout the controversy, and carried the producer's English-language labels.

On 12 February 2013, Der Spiegel reported that Israel falsely labels products from Golan as "made in Israel", mentioning wine as one example.

In June 2019 the Advocate general of the European Court of Justice set forth his advisory legal opinion that a decision made by a French court in 2018, which waived the requirement to identify the origin of Israeli wines in the West Bank, was invalid. A binding decision was deferred to November 12, 2019, at which date the court confirmed that retailers must specify in their labelling when selling foodstuffs if they come from the occupied territories, including East Jerusalem, and whether they are produced in an Israeli settlement.

In 2020, the Netherlands Food and Consumer Product Safety Authority warned the Christian Zionist organisation "Christenen voor Israël" for selling wines produced in Kiryat Arba (near Hebron) with the designation "Made in an Israeli village in Judea and Samaria", already having been changed from "Made in Israel".

== See also ==
- Economy of Israel
- History of wine
- Israeli cuisine
- Kosher wine
- Palestinian wine
- Wine in the Middle East
- Gaza wine produced in the Byzantine period in southern Palestine and shipped from Gaza
