= Barkan Wine Cellars =

Israeli winery

- Location: Hulda, Israel
- Coordinates: 31°49′44″N 34°53′03″E
- Wine region: Samson
- Other labels: dOmaine, Derekh Eretz
- Founded: 1990
- Key people: Shmuel Boxer, Yair Lerner
- Parent company: Tempo Beer Industries
- Other products: Stock 84, Keglevich Vodka, Stock Liqueurs
- Distribution: International
- Website: www.barkan-winery.co.il

Barkan Wine Cellars (Hebrew: יקבי ברקן) is the largest Israeli winery, producing 12-14 million bottles a year. The main building of the winery is located at Kibbutz Hulda, east of Tel Aviv. Barkan receives grapes from vineyards in the Golan Heights, Upper Galilee, Lower Galilee, Mount Tabor region, the Jerusalem Mountains and Mitzpe Ramon.

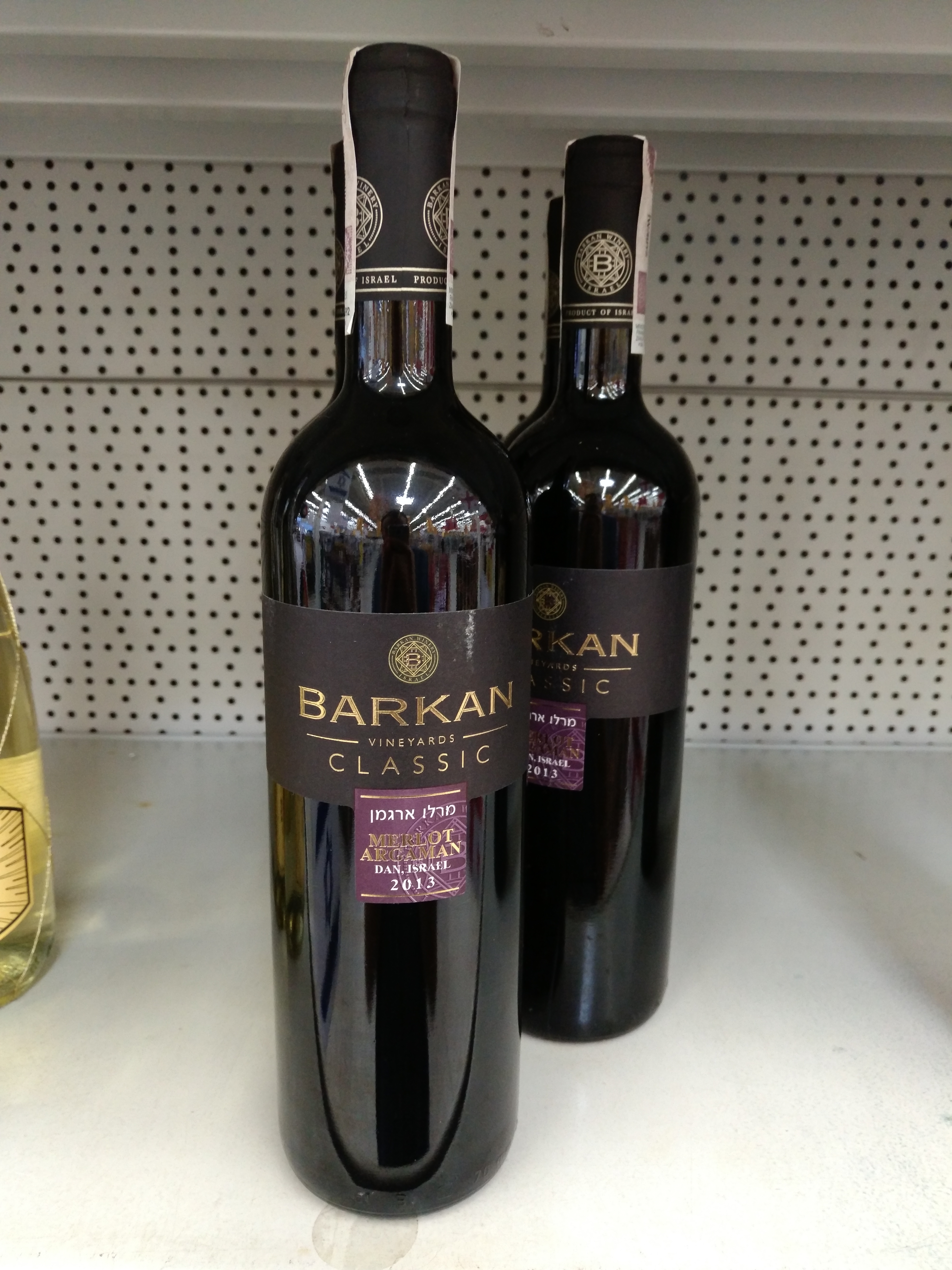
Barkan Classic Red

== History ==
In 1899, Shlomo Friedman established the Friedman Winery in Petah Tikva to produce sweet Kiddush wine and brandy for the Jewish community in Palestine. Shlomo's son, Bezalel, took over the business and moved to Kiryat Matalon, Petah-Tikva's industrial zone, then a desolate sand dune. In 1964, the winery was acquired by Tnuva, which supplied the grapes, mainly Alicante and Carignane. The winery's name was changed to Tnuva-Friedman.

In 1971 Tnuva sold the winery to the Stock liqueur company, which produced mainly brandy, vodka, liqueurs, vermouth, and other non-wine alcoholic beverages. The winery in Petah Tikva was renamed Hamartef (The Cellar), and began producing wines from better grape varieties such as Cabernet Sauvignon, and Sauvignon Blanc.

In 1988, Stock built a new winery near the Israeli settlement of Ariel, in the Barkan Industrial Park. Two years later, two of Stock's major grape growers purchased the company and renamed it Barkan Wine Cellars. After acquiring the Segal Winery in 2001, Barkan became Israel's second largest winery.

In 1990, a new facility opened at Kibbutz Hulda. The Hulda vineyard, covering over 1,200 dunams, is the largest single vineyard in Israel. The location was chosen for its proximity to the Hulda vineyards and major Israeli highways. The winery at Hulda received its first shipment of grapes in 2000. Bottling facilities moved to Hulda in 2003. Since the completion of a new warehouse in 2007, the entire operation has moved there. The winery, covering an area of 50,000 square meters, has a 12-million liter tank farm, an automated crushing and fermentation plant, and a 10,000 square meter filling and case storage building.

Segal wine has been produced at the Barkan winery at Kibbutz Hulda since 2001, but it continues to be marketed independently.

Barkan is now developing a vineyard of 150 dunams in Mitzpe Ramon.

In 2012, the winery agreed to dismantle the fences it built around new vineyards in the vicinity of Beit Nekofa at the request of the Society for the Protection of Nature in Israel and environmentalists who claimed that gazelles became entangled in them.

According to the Israel Export and International Cooperation Institute, Barkan is one of Israel's leading wine producers. Of some 25 Israeli wineries exporting to America, Barkan heads the list, along with Binyamina, Carmel, Dalton, Domaine du Castel, Efrat, Galil Mountain, Golan Heights Winery, Recanati and Tishbi.

The company wines include Village, La Tavola, Barkan Classic, Reserve, Signature, Superior and Altitude. Barkan works in partnership with wineries all over the world, including the Royal Wine Company (United States), Kedem Europe Ltd. (United Kingdom); Ron Riess Import Export (Germany) and S.A.R.L.-Zaoui (France).

== Controversy ==
In June 2018, an undercover news investigation by Israel's Kan 11 television station claimed that the company had banned some employees from coming in contact with its wine

== See also ==
- Israeli wine
- Israeli cuisine
