= Argaman (disambiguation) =

Argaman is an Israeli settlement in the West Bank.

Argaman may also refer to:

- Argaman (grape), Israeli wine grape
- Argaman (surname)
- A Hebrew and Canaanite purple dye, possibly Tyrian purple
