= Palestinian wine =

Wine making in Palestine

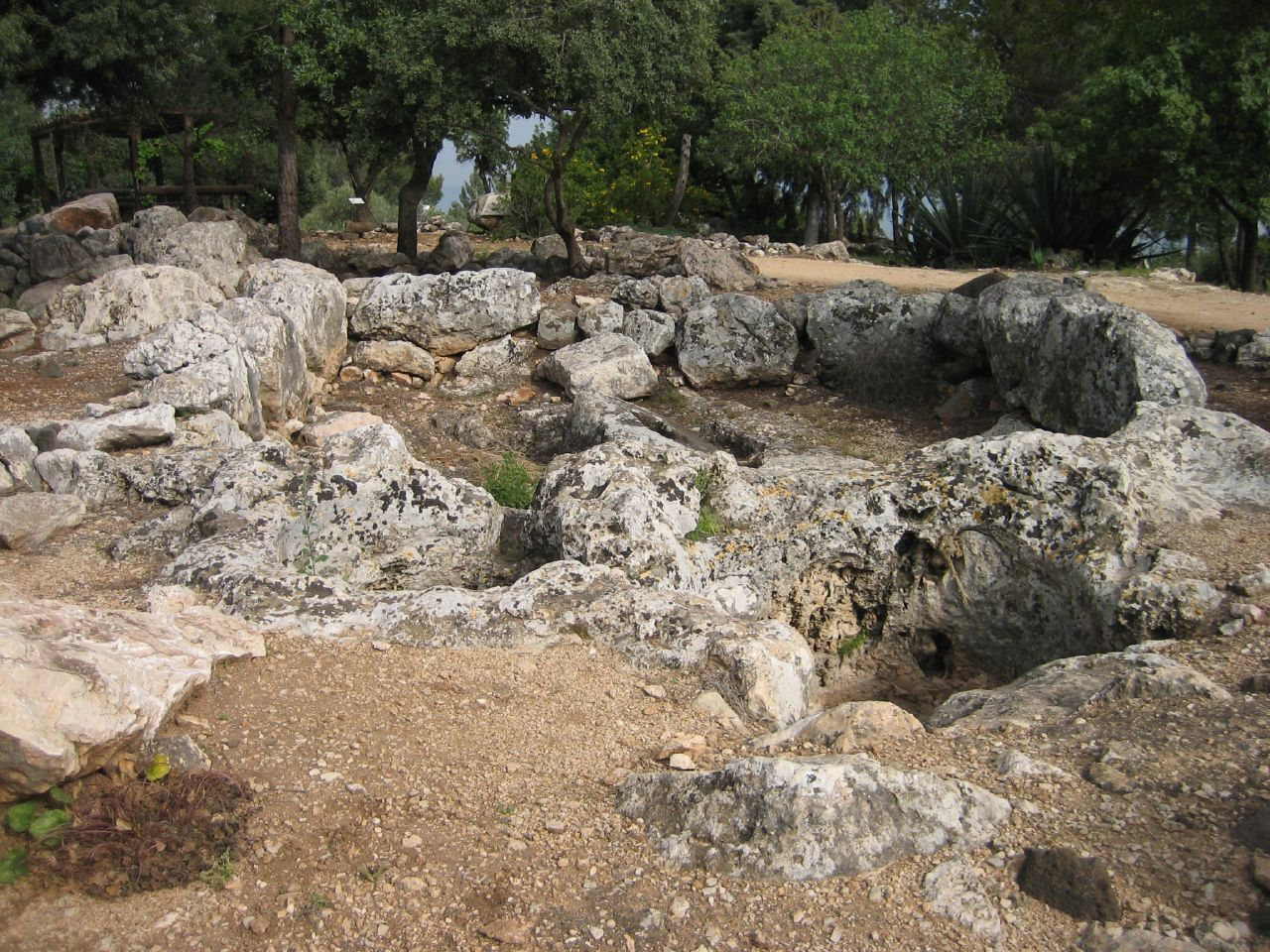
Ruins of an ancient wine press dating to the Talmudic period (100–400 CE), Vered Hagalil, Israel

Wine has been produced in the Holy Land since ancient times. Wine was not only an important factor in Jewish religious ritual, but used as a catalyzer of social interaction, a component of the local diet and for medicinal purposes. During the Byzantine period, large-scale production led to international commerce, with wine exported around the Mediterranean region. Production by Christians diminished with the Islamic conquest in the 7th century and was temporarily revived with the settlement of Frankish Christians under the Crusades in the 12th-13th centuries. Jews continued to cultivate vineyards in the late 15th century into the Ottoman period. The first modern wineries were established by German Templers at Sarona (now a neighborhood of Tel Aviv in Israel) in 1874/5 and by Jews supported by Baron Edmond de Rothschild from France at Rishon LeZion (also in Israel) in 1882.

== Antiquity ==
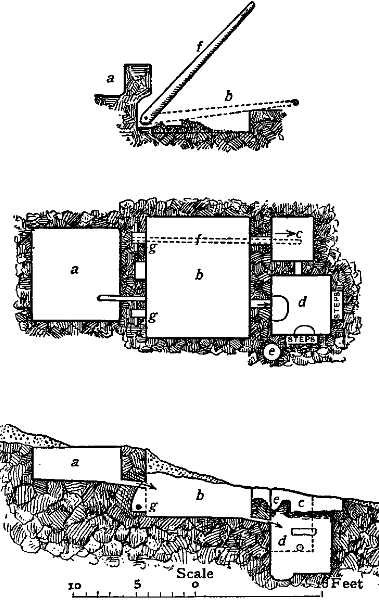
Plan and sections of an ancient Canaan wine press

Ancient Egypt was supplied with Canaan wine as early as the Early and Late Bronze Ages. Tell es-Sakan was an Egyptian city near the Mediterranean Coast. During its inhabitation between c. 3300 and 3000 BCE it functioned as a trading hub and based on the extent of discoveries of wine jars at the site the archaeologists Moain Sadeq and Pierre de Miroschedji hypothesise that it exported wine from the region to Egypt. Many Canaan wine jugs were discovered at Abydos, Egypt inside the royal Umm el-Qa'ab tombs of the Early Dynastic Period of Egypt (c. 3100 BCE), suggesting that wine from Canaan was a crucial part of elite banquets. Wine offerings were a common feature of Near Eastern ancient worship. Egyptians from the 15th century BCE described the wine of Canaan as being "more abundant than water." Wine was also to be used later in the Jewish sacrificial ritual to supplement other offerings.

== Roman and Byzantine period ==
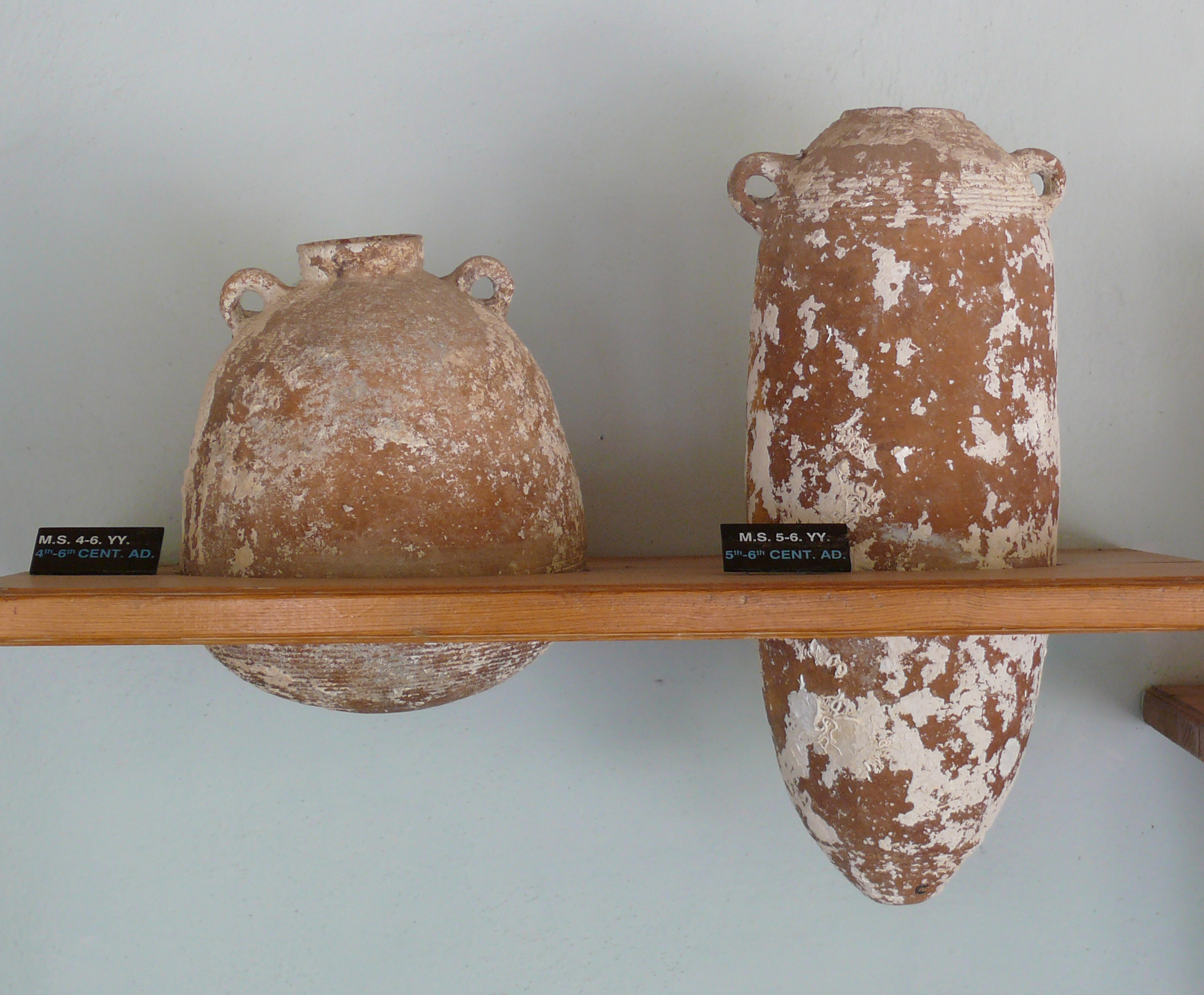
Roman-era Palestinian amphorae, Bodrum Castle, Turkey

Vines were among the three major crops cultivated in Roman and Byzantine Palestine and there are numerous remains of ancient winery installations. Wine was produced throughout the region, from the fertile plains in the north, to the arid areas of the Negev. In Akhziv, an enormous press with the capacity for 59,000 litres was dated to the 4th century. Archaeology suggests that there was a substantial increase in production in the early Byzantine period and most of the large-scale presses date to this era. The rabbis of the Talmudic era devoted much attention to wine production and commerce and instituted many laws religious pertaining to it. Although the Talmud states that "the wine of Tyre was cheaper than Palestinian wine," nowhere does it mention that wine was ever exported abroad. Various other sources from the Byzantine period reveal that this indeed occurred. Around the mid-fourth century, the anonymous writer of Expositio totius mundi et gentium states: "Ashkelon and Gaza...export the best wine to all Syria and Egypt." Transport jars or amphorae have been found in large quantities at various Mediterranean sites, at harbours and as parts of shipwrecked cargos off the shores of Cyprus, Greece and Asia Minor. Significant international trade in Palestinian wine started in the early 5th century, and lasted another 250 years. The deposits of Palestinian amphorae in foreign regions is substantial. They show that Palestinian wines were exported as far as Spain, Gaul and the British Isles. In this period, they accounted for 45% of amphorae found in Carthage, 20% at 6th-century Argos and Marseille and 16% at Naples in the 7th century. It is assumed that the Palestinian Bag Jar, one of the most common forms of pottery to be found in the southern Levant, carried white Palestinian wine when exported. John the Almsgiver (7th-cent.) is said to have admired the aromatic bouquet of the expensive Palestinian wine he was offered in Alexandria. Coming from the land of the Bible, Palestinian wine appealed to Christian priests for use during the Eucharist.

== Islamic and Crusader period ==
In the late 7th century, the Western Church stopped using Palestinian wine, probably because it became too expensive or unavailable after the Arab invasion. During the first Islamic centuries, wine continued to be produced and was not only consumed by Christians and Jews, but by Muslims as well, who compiled "wine poems" in their honour. In the later periods of Muslim domination, wine making diminished as the cultivation of vineyards was either restricted or was forbidden by religious Islamic law. An ancient press vat found at Rehovot (in Israel) indicates that it went out of use during the 8th-9th centuries, it being used instead as a rubbish pit. When the Crusaders took Palestine in the 12th century, the demand for wine by the Latin Church and among the Frankish city-dwellers made vine-growing a lucrative business once again. The Franks established vine-growing settlements and even after they abandoned their colony at Ramathes (modern day Al-Ram) in 1187, it continued to produce wine until the late 15th century. Meshullam of Volterra (1481) found that in Gaza, only the Jews were involved in the production of wine.

== Ottoman era and British Mandate ==
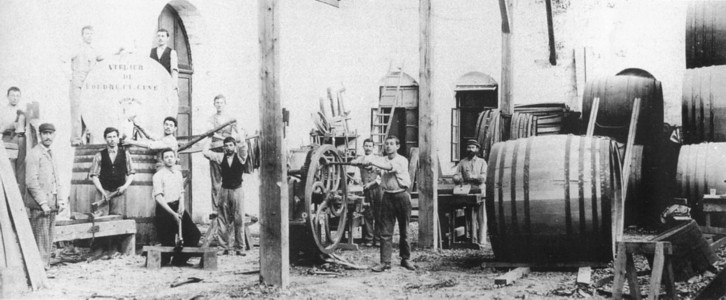
Winemaking in Zikhron Yaakov, 1890s

=== 1500s–1700s ===
In the 16th century, although the Ottoman authorities forbade wine consumption by Muslims, they tolerated its sale to non-Muslims. Later, in 1754, an Ottoman regulation aimed at preventing drunkenness and immodesty, prohibited Jews from selling wine to Muslims or Christians.

=== 1800s–1900s ===
The mid-19th century saw a rapid expansion of grape cultivation, mostly by Jewish farmers. Rabbi Isaac Schorr founded a modern winery in Jerusalem in 1848. The same year, a Palestinian messenger (i.e. a Jewish community representative) on a fund-raising mission to Jamaica brought with him 32 barrels of wine of the Land of Israel, with the proceeds from its sale going to relief for the Jews back in the Holy Land. In 1870, Rabbi Abraham Tepperberg founded the Efrat winery in the Old City of Jerusalem and the Jewish Agricultural School at Mikveh Israel began growing the first vines of European variety.

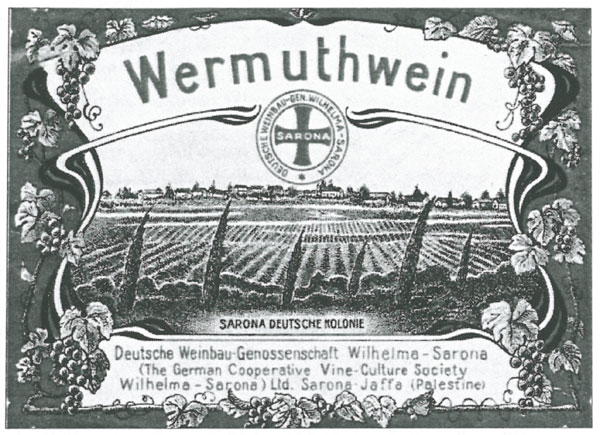
Label on wine produced in Sarona, c. 1920

The German Templers who founded a colony at Sarona in 1871 adopted viticulture as one of their industries. They introduced the first wine factory and the first modern wine cellars into Palestine. In 1874/5 a winery co-operative was formed and the first winery and cellars were built. A second winery was built in 1890 and export of wine to Germany began. In 1898 a new larger winery was built by the Deutsche Weinbaugenossenschaft Sarona-Jaffa (German Winegrowers' Co-operative of Sarona-Jaffa). By the end of the 1890s, there were 150 hectares of vineyards producing 4000 hectoliters (106,000 US gallons) annually.

The new Templer settlement of Wilhelma was added to the wine cooperative in 1902. Wine production at Sarona and Wilhelma continued during the British Mandate, with overseas sales mostly to southern Germany.

Jewish vine cultivation on a large commercial scale began in 1882 with the opening of the Carmel Winery in Rishon LeZion. It was the initiative of Baron Edmond James de Rothschild who invested millions of francs to develop Palestinian viticulture, the growing and the production of wines and cognacs. American vine stocks were imported upon which French shoot were grafted. French experts were brought over to assist in the project. A large wine cellar was built and modern machinery was installed. Rothschild was nevertheless forced to purchase Palestinian wine at above-market prices to keep the operation viable.

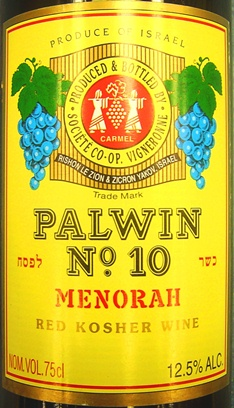
Palestine Wine remains a prominent choice for British Jews today.

Kosher red wine was sweet and lacking in sophistication. British Prime Minister Benjamin Disraeli remarked that it tasted "not so much like wine, but more like what I expect to receive from my doctor as a remedy for a bad winter cough."

Other wineries established in this period and still functioning today include the Cremisan Monastery, near Bethlehem, where Italian Salesian monks have been making wine since 1885 and the Latrun Monastery where French Trappist monks began winemaking in 1899. Vineyard acreage in the Jewish sector totalled around 11,000 dunam in 1890 and around 26,000 dunam by 1900.

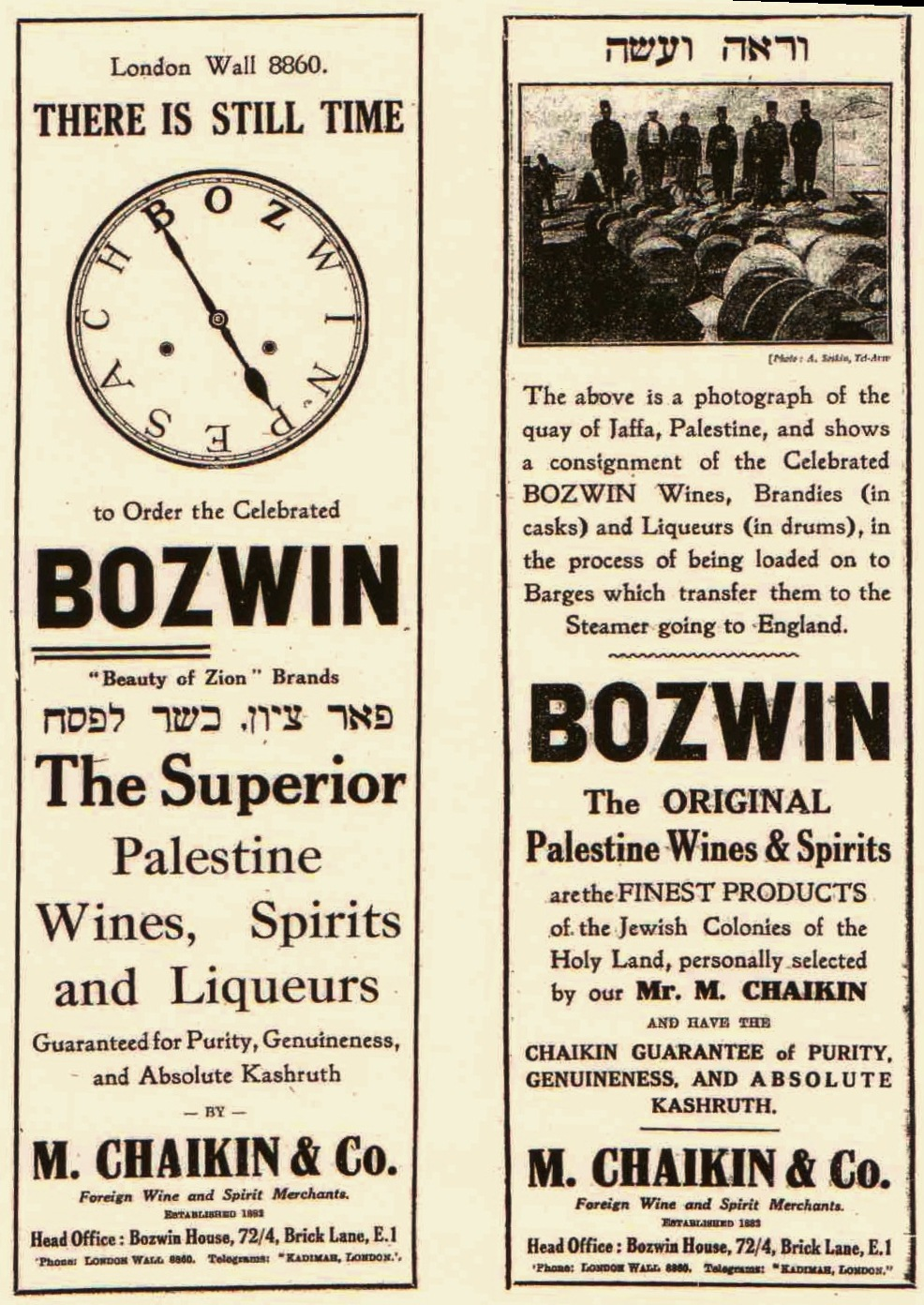
Bozwin advert, Jewish Chronicle, 1930s

In 1883, M. Chaikin & Co. was founded in the United Kingdom. It imported wine produced in Petah Tikva bearing the name "Bozwin" (Beauty of Zion Wine). In 1898, another London company, the Palestine Wine Trading Co., was established. A "wine-war" erupted between the two British companies, both claiming the exclusive importation of kosher Palestinian wine. Today, Palwin, an abbreviation for "Palestine wine" and produced by Carmel Winery, is Israel's oldest brand, producing 100,000 bottles every year. Palestinian wine received the gold medal at the Paris Exposition of 1900.

By 1903, wine constituted Palestine's third-largest export and continued to be a key economic commodity. The Standard Encyclopedia of the Alcohol Problem (1929) stated that Palestinian wine was intoxicating, contrary to statements which asserted that it is "so light and pure, that a person may drink almost any quantity of it without feeling any unpleasant effects."

Before World War I, the United States and Russia were the largest markets for Palestine wine. Due to the war and with the advent of Prohibition in the United States in 1920, the market declined dramatically. In the early 1920s, American Orthodox Jewish congregations unsuccessfully petitioned the authorities to allow the import of Palestinian wine for sacramental use over the Passover holiday. Large stocks of unsold wine was being used to make jam and concentrated grape juice for the European markets. In December 1926, the US prohibition department allowed the import of Palestinian kosher wine, which was obtained by Jews through the rabbis of their congregations. The Repeal of Prohibition in 1933 led to an American contract with Rothschild winery which initially provided for the importation of one million bottles of wines and liquor from Palestine over three years, a $15,000,000 concern. The contract was later revised to allow for the import of for 3,000,000 bottles in 1934 alone. Early 1934 saw a 30% increase in the export of Palestinian wine, most of it shipped to the US, from where Palestine had been receiving "urgent requests for tens of thousands of bottles of Jewish wine." In order to meet the demand, Palestinian vintners planned to establish new areas in Samaria for grape cultivation. The lifting of the Prohibition in the United States and permission to import Palestinian wine rejuvenated the wine growing business in Palestine. Yet, in Poland, sales of Palestinian wine reached a record low in 1936 owing to poverty among Jewish buyers. In March 1936, the issue of whether increasing alcohol consumption in Palestine was arousing resentment among the Arabs was raised in the House of Commons. The Colonial Secretary rejected a request that the issuance of retail liquor sale licenses in Palestine be halted. When food distribution was disrupted during WWII, Jewish merchants in Palestine agreed to exchange 500 tons of potatoes from Syria for the equivalent in wine.

== Modern industry ==
Cremisan Winery, founded in 1885, is the oldest winery in Palestine and produces wines sold globally. The vineyard was founded and is owned by the Salesians who founded it to create local jobs and fund assistance to the needy.

Nadim Khoury, a Palestinian who is known for establishing Taybeh Brewery, has also opened a winery in the West Bank Christian majority village of Taybeh. Using 21 indigenous varieties of grapes, the wines produced were quick to gain visitors' praise. Khoury admits that Israeli restrictions has made it difficult to do business, his shipments for example, including his wine-making equipment, have been delayed because of Israeli checkpoint inspections. Other problems that the business owners endure, is difficulty shipping to the United States, due to the fact that there is no free trade agreement between the two countries. A wine festival is now held annually in the town.

== See also ==
- History of wine
- Israeli wine
- Wine in the Middle East
- Winemaking
- Agriculture in Palestine

== Bibliography ==
- Adler, Elkan Nathan (2004). Jewish Travellers. Routledge. ISBN 0415344662.
- Bard, Kathryn A., ed. (1999). Encyclopedia of the archaeology of ancient Egypt. Psychology Press. ISBN 0415185890.
- Barnay, Y. (1992). The Jews in Palestine in the eighteenth century: under the patronage of the Istanbul Committee of Officials for Palestine. University of Alabama Press. ISBN 0817305726.
- Baron, Salo Wittmayer; Kahan, Arcadius; Gross, Nachum (1975). Economic history of the Jews. Schocken Books. ISBN 0198225369.
- Baron, Salo Wittmayer; Baron, Jeannette Meisel (1943). Palestinian messengers in America, 1849-79. Ayer Publishing. ISBN 0405102267.
- Bowden, William (2003). Theory and practice in late antique archaeology. BRILL. ISBN 9004125671.
- Broshi, Magen (2001). Bread, wine, walls and scrolls. Continuum International Publishing Group. ISBN 1841272019.
- Cantor, Norman F. (1969). Medieval history: the life and death of a civilization. Macmillan. ISBN 9780023190704. "using Palestinian wine in the Eucharist and published its."
- Cesarani, David (1994). The Jewish chronicle and Anglo-Jewry, 1841-1991. Cambridge University Press. ISBN 0521434343.
- Cherrington, Ernest Hurst (1929). Standard encyclopedia of the alcohol problem, Volume 5. American issue publishing company.
- Cohen, Amnon (2002). Economic Life in Ottoman Jerusalem By. Cambridge University Press. ISBN 0521524350.
- Fouracre, Paul (1995). The New Cambridge Medieval History: c. 500-c. 700. Cambridge University Press. ISBN 0521362911.
- Gilbar, Gad G. (1986). Palestine in the late Ottoman period: political, social, and economic transformation. BRILL. ISBN 9004077928.
- Glenk, Helmut; Blaich, Horst; Haering, Manfred (2005). From Desert Sands to Golden Oranges: The History of the German Templer Settlement of Sarona in Palestine 1871-1947. Trafford Publishing.
- Hazony, Yoram (2001). The Jewish state: the struggle for Israel's soul. Basic Books. ISBN 0465029027.
- Hezser, Catherine (2010). The Oxford Handbook of Jewish Daily Life in Roman Palestine. Oxford University Press. ISBN 978-0199216437.
- de Miroschedji, Pierre; Sadeq, Moain (2008). "Sakan, Tell es-". The New Encyclopedia of Archaeological Excavations in the Holy Land. Vol. 5: Supplementary Volume. Israel Exploration Society/Biblical Archaeology Society (BAS). Archived from the original on 23 June 2024 – via BAS Library.
- de Miroschedji, Pierre (2015). "Les relations entre l'Égypte et le levant aux IVe et IIIe millénaires à la lumière des fouilles de Tell Es-Sakan" [Relations between Egypt and the Levant in the 4th and 3rd millennia in the light of the excavations at Tell Es-Sakan]. Comptes rendus des séances de l'Académie des Inscriptions et Belles-Lettres (in French). 159 (2): 1003–1038. doi:10.3406/CRAI.2015.94831.
- Opaiț, Andrei (2004). Local and imported ceramics in the Roman province of Scythia (4th-6th centuries AD). Archaeopress. ISBN 1841716278.
- Prawer, Joshua (1980). Crusader institutions. Clarendon Press. ISBN 0198225369.
- Pringle, Denys (1998). The Churches of the Crusader Kingdom of Jerusalem: L-Z (excluding Tyre). Cambridge University Press. ISBN 0521390370.
- Rabinowicz, Tzvi (1997). A world apart: the story of the Chasidim in Britain. Vallentine Mitchell. ISBN 0853032610.
- Robinson, Leonard George (1912). The agricultural activities of the Jews in America. American Jewish committee.
- Rogov, Daniel (2004). Rogov's guide to Israeli wines 2005. Toby Press. ISBN 1592640877. "was Rabbi Itzhak Schorr, who founded a newwinery in Jerusalem in 1848."
- Sharon, Moshe (1999). Corpus inscriptionum Arabicarum Palaestinae. BRILL. ISBN 9004110836.
- Singer, Isidore; Adler, Cyrus (1925). The Jewish encyclopedia: a descriptive record of the history, religion, literature, and customs of the Jewish people from the earliest times to the present day, Volume 9. Funk and Wagnalls. ISBN 0465029027.
- Sperber, Daniel (1978). Roman Palestine, 200-400, the land: crisis and change in agrarian society as reflected in rabbinic sources, Volume 2. Bar-Ilan University.
- Tilbury, Neil (1992). Israel: a travel survival kit. Lonely Planet. ISBN 0864421281. "Bethlehem is the Cremisan Monastery, whose ."
- Ward, Walter David (2008). From provincia arabia to palaestina tertia: The impact of geography, economy, and religion on sedentary and nomadic communities in the later Roman province of Third Palestine. ISBN 978-1109053562.
- Woodman, Jesse Earle (1964). The Exposition Totius Mundi et Gentium: its geography and its language. Ohio State University. Archived from the original on 2017-02-24.

Jewish Telegraphic Agency Press Releases

- Jewish Telegraphic Agency (September 26, 1924) (20 March 2015). Manufacture of Jam in Palestine. Press Release.
- Jewish Telegraphic Agency (March 24, 1926) (20 March 2015). Import of Palestine Wine for Passover Denied by Prohibition Authorities. Press Release.
- Jewish Telegraphic Agency (December 23, 1926) (20 March 2015). Prohibition Dept. Allows Import of Palestine Wine for Sacramental Uses. Press Release.
- Jewish Telegraphic Agency (December 5, 1933) (20 March 2015). Million Bottles of Wine to Be Imported Here from Palestine Within 3 Years. Press Release.
- Jewish Telegraphic Agency (January 24, 1934) (20 March 2015). Palestine Wine Cargo Shipped to New York. Press Release.
- Jewish Telegraphic Agency (March 15, 1934) (20 March 2015). Palestine Vintners Helped by Repeal. Press Release.
- Jewish Telegraphic Agency (April 12, 1934) (20 March 2015). Palestine Wine Export Increases. Press Release.
- Jewish Telegraphic Agency (March 30, 1936) (20 March 2015). Sale of Liquor in Palestine Stirs Queries in Commons. Press Release.
- Jewish Telegraphic Agency (April 9, 1936) (20 March 2015). Joyless, Quiet Passover in Poland. Press Release.
- Jewish Telegraphic Agency (November 29, 1940). No Serious Food Shortage in Palestine, Z.O.A. Says. Press Release.
