= Rimon Winery =

Israeli winery specializing in pomegranate wine

- Location: Kerem Ben Zimra, Israel
- Coordinates: 33.0271°N 35.4774°E
- Founded: 2004
- Key people: Nachmias family
- Varietals: Dry wine, dessert wine, port wine, sparkling wine
- Other products: Pomegranate juice, Pomegranate seed oil
- Distribution: Israel, United States, Japan, Canada and China
- Website: www.rimonwinery.com

Rimon Winery (Hebrew: יקב רימון) is an Israeli winery specialized in producing pomegranate wine, with over a dozen varieties. Rimon is the Hebrew word for pomegranate. Rimon Winery was the first company in the world to commercially make wine from pomegranates.

At Kosherfest 2007 Rimon Winery won "Best New Wine, Beer or Spirit", upon its expansion into the United States. In 2008 Rimon Winery expanded into the United Kingdom, debuting at the London International Wine Fair.

== History ==
In 1996, father and son, Gaby and Avi Nachmias, developed a new strain of pomegranates that they claim is "sweeter, deeper in color and richer in vitamins and antioxidants than other varieties." The Nehemias bottled its first pomegranate wines in 2003, 2,000 bottles of pomegranate dessert wine They founded Rimon Winery the following year, including a commercial production line. By 2007, they offered dry, port, and dessert wines. Rimon produces their wine by crushing the fruit, fermenting it in stainless steel, and then aging the wine in French oak barrels.

The Nachmias are third generation farmers at Kerem Ben Zimra, a Moshav in the Upper Galilee and there developed their special pomegranate species, which has exceptionally large and very sweet fruits. The high concentration of sugar in these fruits, similar to the sugar concentration in grapes, makes this species suitable for wine making.

Rimon Winery was established in 2004 at the Dalton Industrial Park in the Upper Galilee and was the first to produce pomegranate wine commercially. The winery distributes its products in Israel, United States, Japan, Canada and China.

In 2012 OK Kosher Certification stripped Rimon Winery of their kosher certification due to various kashrut issues.

== Wine production process ==
The first stage in the production process of pomegranate wine is the separation of grains from the peel. Then the grains are compressed and the resulting juice is fermented between two and four months. Finally, the wine is transferred into French oak barrels for further aging.

== Prizes ==
In 2007 Rimon port won the bronze medal in the categories best fruit wine and best wine priced at New York's Finger Lakes wine competition in New York. In 2006 Rimon dessert wine won a gold in the category fruit dessert wine Puerto Rico's Curibe Vinos 2006 competition.

== See also ==
- Israeli cuisine
