= Marawi (grape) =

Variety of grape

Marawi, also known as Hamdani, is a white grape variety indigenous to the Southern Levant. Menahem de Lonsano mentioned it as one of the wine varieties available in Jerusalem in the 17th century.

In the 2010s, researchers at Ariel University undertook field work to locate ancient indigenous grape varieties mentioned in historical sources, including the Marawi grape, which had survived as a table grape. In 2014, two wineries released wines made from this grape: Recanati winery, which produced an initial batch of around 2,480 bottles presented internationally, and Cremisan Cellars, located in the Cremisan valley between Jerusalem and Bethlehem, which made wine from Hamdani and Jandali grapes grown in the Hebron and Bethlehem areas. The effort was noted as among the first commercial releases using grapes believed to have ancient roots in the Levant, and wine commentators described the project as a significant step in reconnecting contemporary viticulture in the region with its historical past, as indigenous varieties had largely been supplanted by European grapes in previous centuries.
