= Recanati winery =

Winery in Upper Galilee, Israel

Recanati Winery
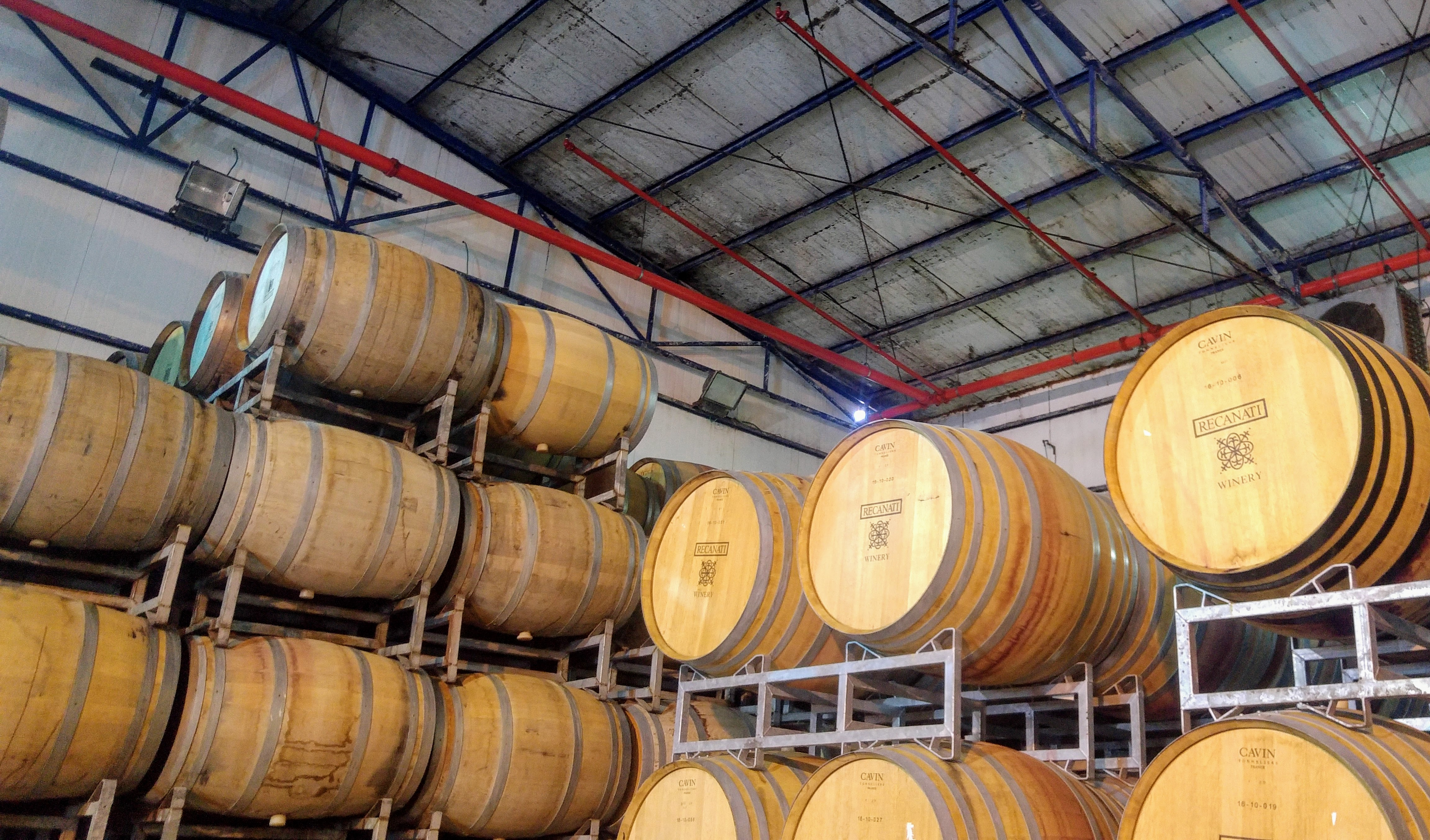
- Location: Ramat Dalton; Upper Galilee, Israel
- Coordinates: 32°24′17.61″N 34°53′49.04″E
- Founded: 2000
- Key people: Lenny Recanati
- Distribution: International
- Website: www.recanati-winery.co.il

Recanati Winery is a winery situated in the Upper Galilee in Israel. Production is 900,000–1 million bottles annually.

== History ==
The winery was founded in 2000 by Lenny Recanati (b. 1953). The winery produces young red and white blends under its Yasmin label, varietals under its Recanati and Reserve labels, and a Special Reserve. All grapes are hand-harvested, two-thirds originating in Recanati’s high-altitude Manara vineyards in the Upper Galilee with which it has contracts, and the remainder from vineyards planted in the clay-rich soil of the Jezreel Valley.

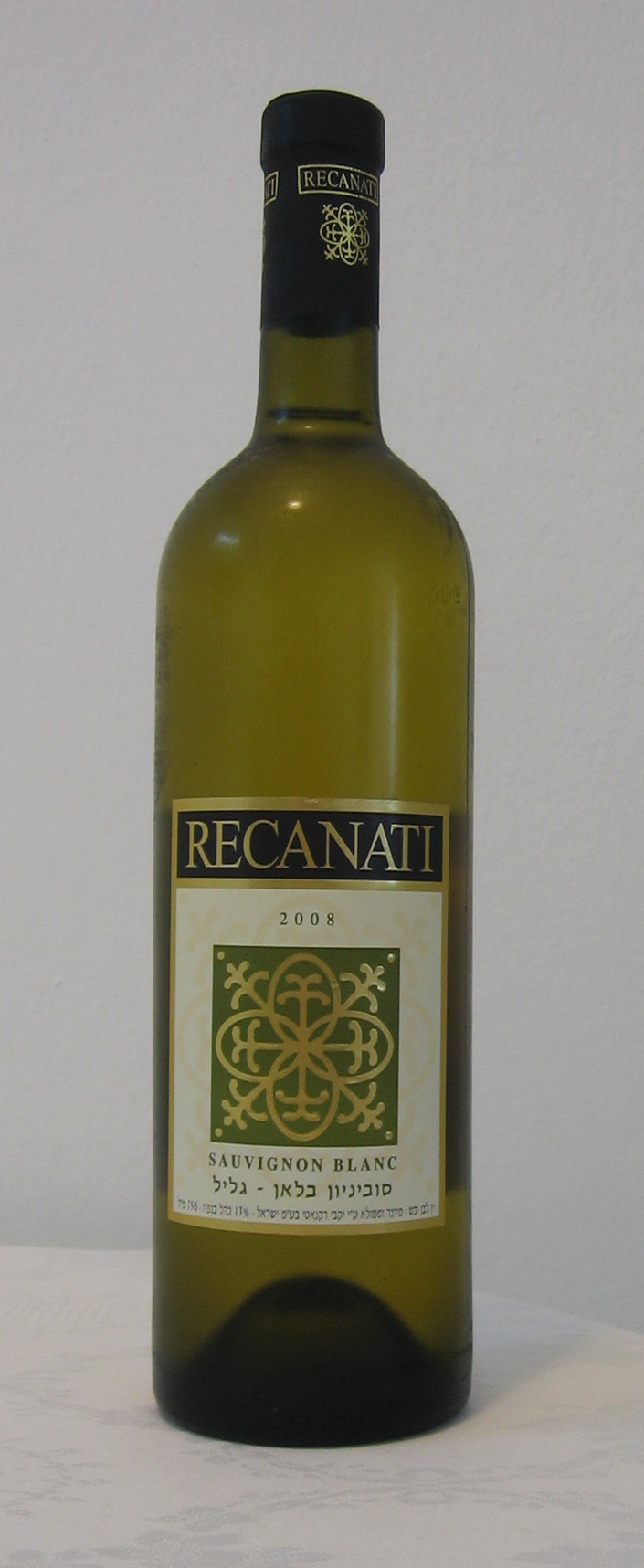
A bottle of Recanati Sauvignon Blanc

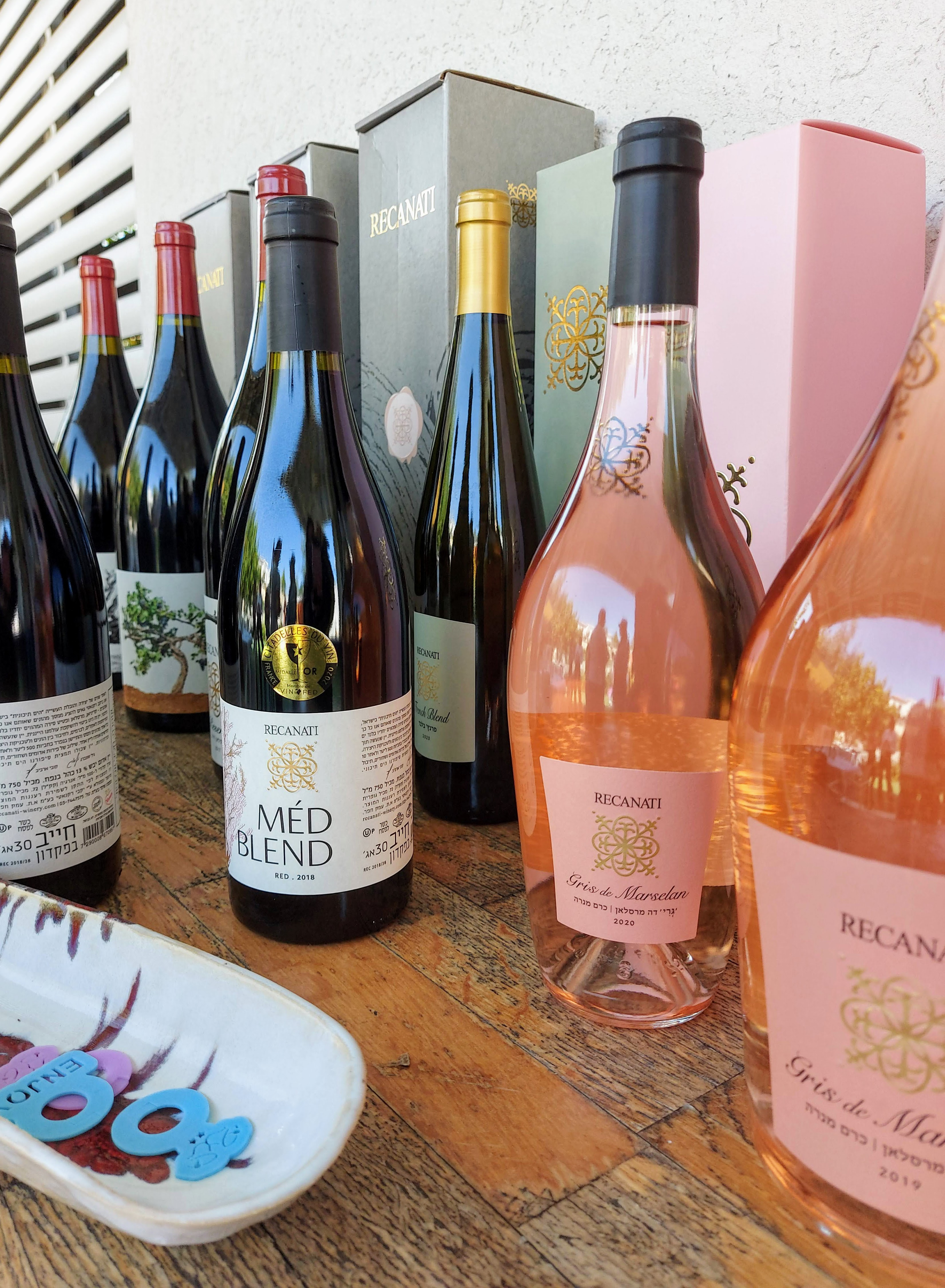
Recanati Marselsan and med blend

Chief winemaker Gil Shatsberg, a graduate of the U.C. Davis wine program, worked for Amphorae and Carmel wineries before joining Recanati. Shatsberg replaced Lewis Pasco, previously winemaker for Chimney Rock and Marimar Torres in California.

In August 2022, after six years of planning and construction, the winery relocated the Hefer Valley to a new site at the Ramat Dalton Industrial Park, in Upper Galilee. Eli Gidron, the winery's CEO, explained that the primary goal of this relocation was to be closer to the vineyards and to strengthen the winery's Israeli roots by contributing to the development of the Galilee region. The new winery is situated on a cliff at an elevation of 850 meters, offering views of Kerem Ben Zimra, Lebanon, the Hula Valley, the Dishon Plateau, and Mount Hermon. A new visitor center was constructed adjacent to the winery.

== See also ==
- Israeli wine
- Israeli cuisine
