= Jose the Galilean =

Jewish sage 1st and 2nd centuries CE

Jose the Galilean (Hebrew: רַבִּי יוֹסֵי הַגְּלִילִי, Rabbi Yose HaGelili), d. 15 Av, was a Jewish sage who lived in the 1st and 2nd centuries CE. He was one of the Tannaim, the rabbis whose work was compiled in the Mishna.

== Biography ==
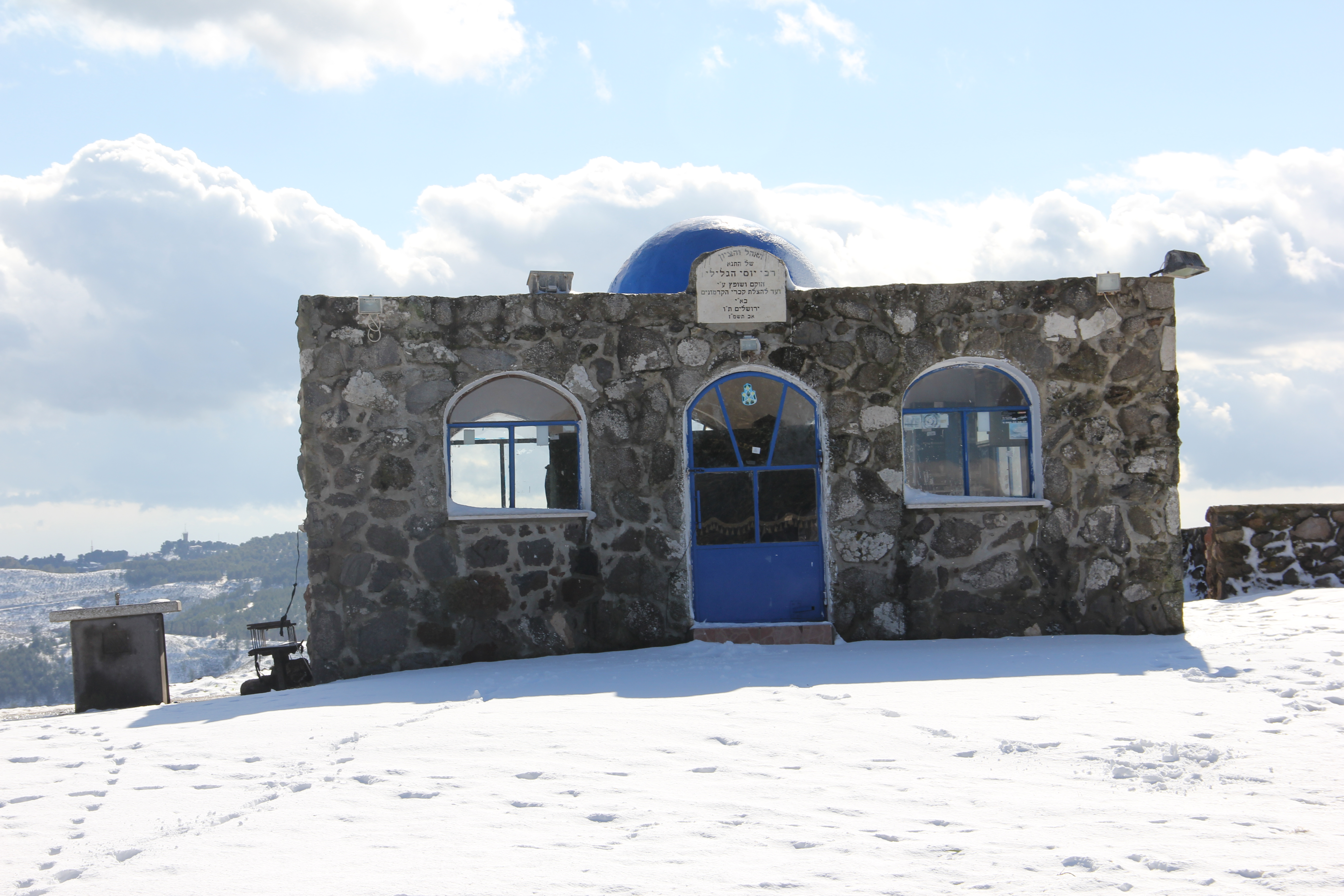
The tomb of Rabbi Yose HaGelili in Dalton, Israel

Neither the name of his father nor the circumstances of his youth are known, though his name ("HaGelili") indicates that he was a native of Galilee. He suffered from the stereotype of Galileans commonly held by Judeans; once a woman who wanted to make a point with him began by calling him a "foolish Galilean".

Jose was a contemporary and colleague of Rabbi Akiva, Rabbi Tarfon, and Eleazar ben Azariah. When he entered the academy at Yavne, he was entirely unknown. It is also noted that he was extremely modest and addressed Tarfon as "my master". He was, nevertheless, a thorough scholar even then, and his arguments nonplused both Tarfon and Akiva. His first appearance at Yavne thus obtained for him general recognition, and the two rabbis considered him not as a pupil, but as a colleague. Akiva was obliged to endure more than one sharp criticism from Jose, who once said to him: "Though you expound the whole day, I shall not listen to you". Tarfon expressed his high esteem of Jose by interpreting Daniel 8:4-7 as though it contained an allusion to him: "I saw the ram, that is, Akiva, and saw that no beast might stand before him; and I beheld the he-goat, that is, Jose the Galilean, come, and cast him down to the ground." As a matter of fact, Jose was the only one who opposed Akiva successfully, and Akiva frequently abandoned his own interpretation in favor of Jose's.

Jose was famed for his piety. An amora of the 3rd century says: "When, for their sins, there is drought in Israel, and such a one as Jose the Galilean prays for rain, the rain comes straightway". The popular invocation, "O Jose ha-Gelili, heal me!" survived even to the 10th century. This invocation is condemned by the Karaite Sahl ben Matzliah.

Jose's married life was unhappy. His wife was malicious and quarrelsome, and frequently insulted him in the presence of his pupils and friends; on the advice of the friends he divorced her. When she married again and was in poverty, Jose was magnanimous enough to support her and her husband. Jose did have a son, Eliezer ben Jose, who followed in his father's footsteps and became a great rabbinic authority.

== Teachings ==
Jose frequently showed a tendency to revert to the older Halakha, explaining the text according to its literal meaning

Generally, though, his halakic exegesis differed little from that of Akiva, and both often employed the same rules of interpretation. He taught that poultry may be cooked in milk and eaten, as was done in his own native town; and that during Passover one may enjoy anything that is leavened, except as food.

Of his aggadic opinions the two following may be mentioned: The command of the Torah that the "face of the old man" shall be honored includes, by implication, the young man who has acquired wisdom. The words "He shall rule over thee" do not include every form of power.

=== Quotes ===
- The righteous have their desires in their power, but the wicked are under the power of their desires.

== Resources ==
- Singer, Isidore and acob Zallel Lauterbach. "Jose the Galilean". Jewish Encyclopedia. Funk and Wagnalls, 1901–1906; which contains the following bibliography:

- Frankel, Hodegetica in Mischnam, pp. 125-127, Leipsic, 1859;
- Brüll, Einleitung in die Mischna, pp. 125-130, Frankfort-on-the-Main, 1876;
- Bacher, Ag. Tan. i. 252-265;
- Weiss, Dor, ii. 119-120.
