= Argaman (grape) =

Variety of grape

- Grape (Vitis)
- Color of berry skin: Noir
- Species: Vitis vinifera
- Origin: Israel
- VIVC number: 17294

Argaman (Hebrew: ארגמן (ענבים)) is an Israeli wine grape. It is a crossing of Souzão and Carignan.

The intention was to produce a variety of wine grape with good rich color, which had been a problem in Israeli wine. Roi Spiegel of the Volcani Institute of Agricultural Research and Shlomo Cohen of the Israeli Wine Institute created the Argaman (lit. "crimson") with this purpose in mind. After hundreds of attempts and micro-vinifications, successful wines were produced from it. Barkan Wine Cellars is one of the wineries that uses the variety.

According to The Oxford Companion to Wine, the Argaman is used primarily for low quality jug wines.

However, Segal Wines, produced from Argaman grapes grown in a vineyard in the Upper Galilee, has won prestigious awards, among them a gold medal at the Bordeaux wine competition. In addition, Jezreel Valley winery won a silver medal at Terravino 2012 with a red blend which includes Argaman. A red wine blend that contains Argaman, the Jezreel 2014 Adumim, has earned 93 out of 100 points by the Wine Enthusiast. Jezreel Valley Winery is one of the leading revolutionaries in the resurgence of Argaman and has successfully bottled a single varietal Argaman which is rich, spicy and complex. In the 2022 Decanter World Wine Awards the Jezreel Argaman was awarded 96 points, the highest rated Israeli wine of that vintage.

== See also ==
- Agricultural research in Israel
- Yael (Grape)
