= Domaine du Castel =

Israeli winery

- Location: Ramat Raziel, Israel
- Coordinates: 31°46′34.94″N 35°4′9.96″E
- Wine region: Jerusalem Hills
- First vintage: 1992
- Key people: Eli Ben-Zaken
- Cases/yr: 8000
- Known for: Castel Grand Vin
- Website: www.castel.co.il

Domaine du Castel (Hebrew: יקב קסטל) is a family owned winery in the Jerusalem corridor, Israel. It produces approximately 100,000 bottles of wine a year, half of which are exported.

== History ==
Domaine du Castel was founded in 1983 by Eli Ben Zaken in Moshav Ramat Raziel on the outskirts of Jerusalem. From its modest start, producing two barrels a year, Domaine du Castel has become a 13-hectare vineyard producing 8,000 cases a year - 40% Cabernet Sauvignon, 29% Merlot, 25% Chardonnay and 6% Petit Verdot. Vines are dense planted and cropped at low yields.

Since the release of 600 bottles in 1992, Ben Zaken and his son, Ariel, oversee the production of 100,000 bottles a year. Haaretz food and wine critic Daniel Rogov writes that Domaine du Castel produces some of the best wines in the country. The winery uses only locally grown grapes from its own vineyards or from those under its full supervision.

== Awards ==
In December 2007, the influential wine critic Robert M. Parker, Jr. and his The Wine Advocate awarded three of Domaine du Castel's wines 90-92 points on his 100-point scale. A total of 14 Israeli wines were rated at least 90 points on this occasion (ranging from 90 to 93), which represented the highest Parker scores ever awarded to wines of the eastern Mediterranean region and was seen as a sign of breakthrough for Israeli wine. A 2005 white wine from Domaine du Castel was the highest-scoring of all white wines.
