= Wine in religious communities of the Middle East =

The production and consumption of wine has been widespread in the Middle East and has been tolerated to varying extents by different religious groups. Islam forbade all intoxicants (khamr) for Muslims. Wine was traded and used among the Jews, at least in Egypt, including for sacramental purposes, and had to be prepared by Jews according to stated practices. Many Christian monasteries in the region made and sold wine to raise revenue. Finally, the Zoroastrian communities of Persia continued to make and drink wine after the Islamic conquest.

== Early period ==
Though written sources regarding alcoholic drinks before the early 7th century are scarce, literature concerning the early Muslims reveals a great deal of information about alcohol at the time of Muhammad. The Hadith collected by al-Bukhari, records a number of fermented drinks available in the Arabian Peninsula at that time. According to ‘Umar ibn al-Khaṭṭāb, “Intoxicants (khamr) are prepared from five things: raisins, dates, wheat, barley, or honey,” while Anas ibn Malik mentions wines made from at least four different kinds of dates. In addition to declaring wine to be haram, Muhammad reportedly considered other cooked or fermented drinks such as tilā’ and naqir as inebriating and thus forbade the pressing of grapes and the drinking of pressed grape juice. The early caliphs, however, distributed cooked wine (tilā’) to Muslim troops, and it was not until the reign of ‘Umar II that the caliph prohibited drinking such a drink.

As the early Muslim armies conquered more territory, though, increasing populations of non-Muslims were brought under Muslim rule, necessitating the development of a body of law regulating the interaction between Muslims and non-Muslim dhimmis. A document used for guiding Muslim pacts with dhimmi communities known as the Shuruṭ ‘Umar forbids dhimmis from selling forbidden products: pork, wine, carrion – to Muslims.

== Wine in Jewish communities ==
The Egyptian Jewish communities of the medieval period used wine sacramentally in feasts, prayers, and at holy events, and also prescribed its use in Talmudic medicine. As the wine had to be prepared according to Jewish doctrine, only Jews could undertake its preparation, so a “ramified wine-trade was a necessity of life.” According to the documents of the Cairo Geniza, which mainly describe Jewish life in medieval Egypt, there were four types of Jewish wine-traders: those who invested in wine merchantry, full-time wine retailers or cellarers (Arabic nabbādhīn), religious dignitaries, and physicians; some Egyptian Jews are also listed as “grape-pressers” (Arabic ‘assar). Court records show that Jewish wine producers (Arabic karrām) leased pre-existing vineyards from the Ayyubid and Mamluk governments. Both alternated between imposing “vice taxes,” which taxed wine, hashish, and prostitution, among other things, and yielded vast tax revenues and banning outright the production of wine. As a result, there were often “distinct and prolonged conflict[s]…between the desire to combat vice, in accordance with religious conscience, and the reluctance of the rulers to renounce the abundant revenue it provided.” Egyptian Jews, despite the Muslim prohibition on alcoholic beverages and intermittent state action to ban its production and sale, engaged in a lively wine business, the volume of which “was no doubt significant…for the taxes on it…yielded the state very high revenues.”

Wine today is common in Israel, local wineries can be found at most of Israel's villages as well as inside towns and cities, there is also a wine made of pomegranate.

== Wine in Christian communities ==
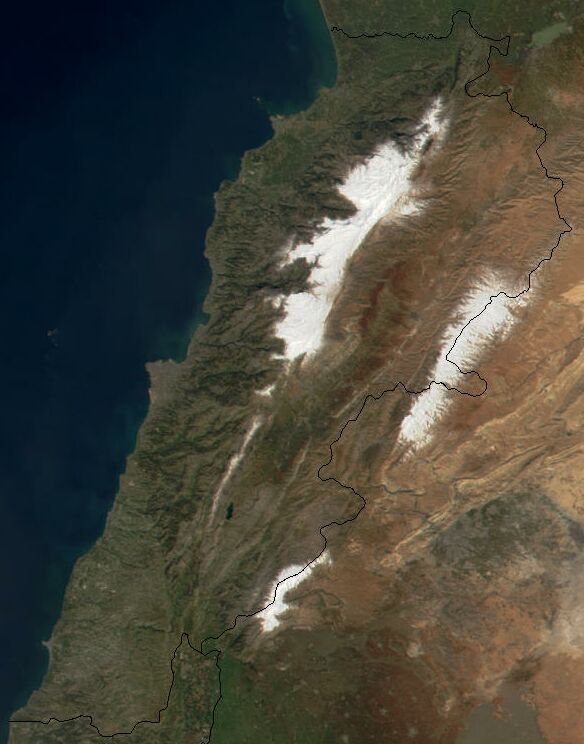
Map of Lebanon: Vitis vinifera evidence from ancient Rome shows wine was cultivated and then domesticated in Lebanon, at least 2000 years before Alexander the Great.

Lebanon is among the oldest sites of wine production in the world. The Israelite prophet Hosea (780–725 BC) is said to have urged his followers to return to Yahweh so that "they will blossom as the vine, [and] their fragrance will be like the wine of Lebanon". The Phoenicians of its coastal strip were instrumental in spreading wine and viticulture throughout the Mediterranean in ancient times. Despite the many conflicts of the region, the country has an annual production of about 600,000 cases of wine. Recently, the sector has been witnessing an unprecedented growth. The number of wineries went from 5 in 1998 to over 30 today.

Monasteries (Arabic dayr دير) that were numerous in what are now Iraq, Syria, Palestine, and Egypt usually included, in addition to a church and monks< cells, an inn or caravanserais and land for agricultural cultivation. The monasteries drew revenue to meet their needs from their agricultural produce, most commonly date and olive products, and wine. Monasteries often became notable for their vintages, the inns and taverns attached to them became popular as private destinations for urban elites who enjoyed alcohol, and monasteries eventually came to figure prominently in Arabic khamriyya poetry. Monasteries and convents such as those in Qutrabbul, ‘Ana, Karkh, Falluj, Mosul, and Zandaward in Iraq, and the Convent of the Transfiguration in Syria, produced wine to such an extent that “monks became thus the biggest producers of wine in the Muslim lands.”

The Arab elites, in particular, visited monastery taverns frequently enough that an entire literary genre, known as dayriyyāt, developed. The Kitāb al-Diyārāt (“monastery books”) collected poems and stories that described time spent in revelry at monasteries.

== Wine in Zoroastrian communities ==
In the Sassanian period in Persia, wine was an important part of court ritual, and imperial presses have been discovered in Fars. These presses were shut down after the Muslim conquests in the late 7th and early 8th centuries, but the production of wine by the local Zoroastrian communities continued. The Zoroastrians, because of a unique confluence of their laws regarding commerce with Muslims and Muslim laws regarding commerce with Zoroastrians, produced and sold wine, and opened taverns to such an extent that the Persian term mobadhcheh (“son of a magus,” where “magus” is a term referring to Zoroastrians) became a well-known device referring to wine stewards in Persian bacchic poetry. Additionally, Persian-produced wine is mentioned frequently in both Arabic and Persian bacchic poetry, implying the presence of wine in those regions. Hafiz refers both to drinking adventures occurring “within the Magian tavern,” and Zoroastrian tavern-wenches serving wine and providing entertainment. Abu Nuwas “refer[s] several times to “superb Persian wine, “wine [selected] for Persian kings,” and “vintage Persian red,” and refers to vintages by their location.

== See also ==
- History of wine
- Phoenicians and wine
- Lebanese wine
- Alcohol in Islam
- Persian wine
  - Shiraz wine
- Israeli wine
