= Argaman (surname) =

Agraman is a Hebrew-language surname. Notable people with this surname include:

- Nadav Argaman (born 1960), Israeli intelligence officer
- Yosef Argaman (born 1947), Israeli writer and military historian
- Rachel Shane Argaman (born 1955), Israeli actress, writer, film director and producer
- Shahar Argaman, IDF general
