= Teperberg 1870 =

Winery in the Judean Hills, Israel

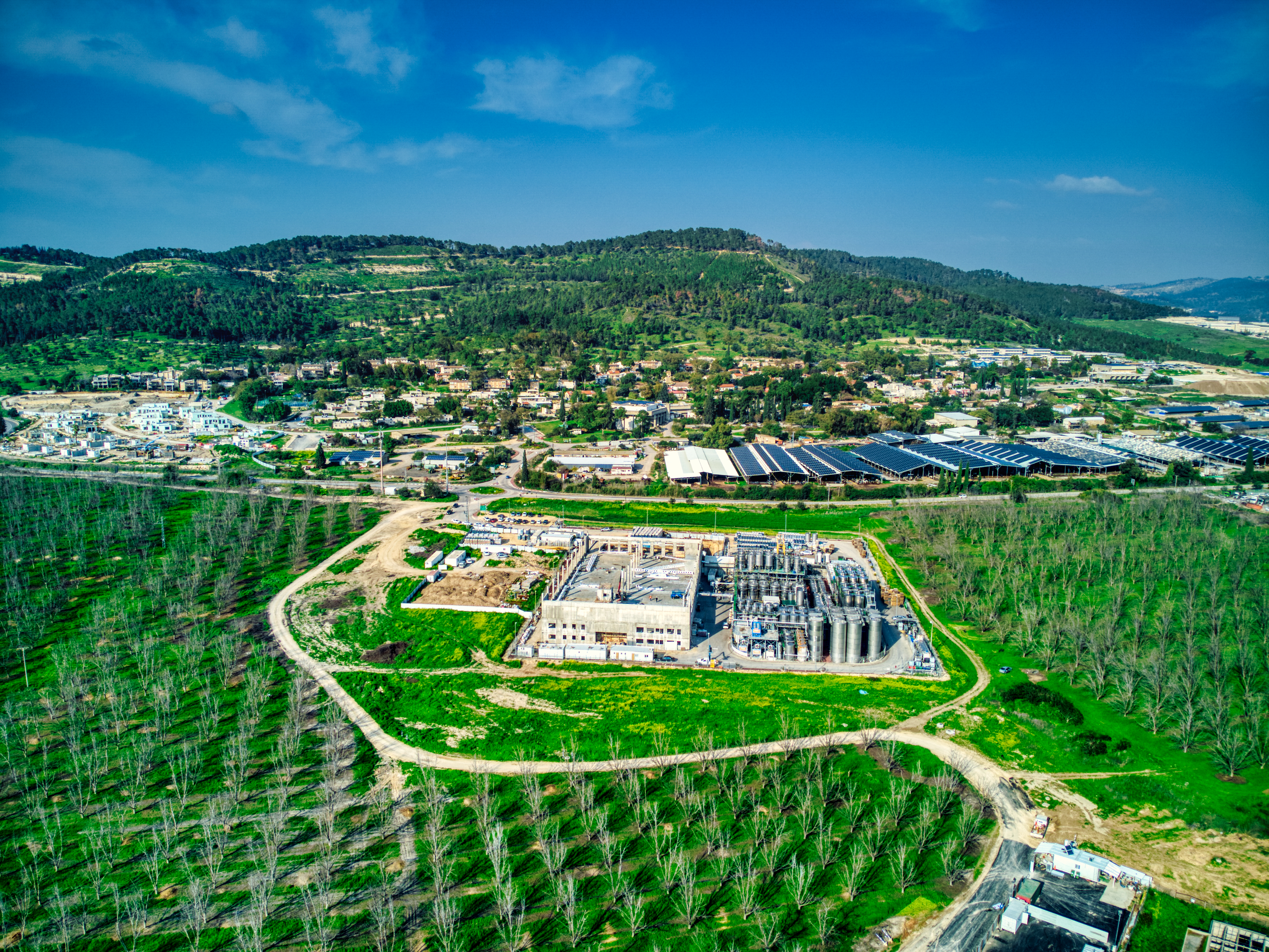
- Tzora Kibbutz and Teperberg 1870 Winery
- Location: Tzora, Israel
- Coordinates: 31°47′38.37″N 35°10′3.75″E
- Wine region: Judean Hills
- Formerly: Efrat
- Other labels: Efrat
- Founded: 1870
- Website: teperbergwinery.co.il/en/

Teperberg 1870 Winery (Hebrew: יקב טפרברג 1870) is a winery near kibbutz Tzora in the foothills of the Judean hills, Israel. Founded in 1870 in Ottoman Palestine, it is Israel's oldest winery, as well as its fourth largest.

== History ==
Originally called Efrat, the winery was founded in 1870 by Avraham Teperberg and his son, Zeev Zaid Teperberg. The name was based on the biblical "Efrata shehi Beit Lechem", the road by which the grapes were brought to the winery. It was first established in the Old City of Jerusalem. When Zeev Teperberg died in 1905, his son, Mordechai Shimon, took over the management. The Mandate government ruled that all "industries" had to leave the Old City of Jerusalem, so the winery moved outside the city walls to various locations. In 1950, Mordechai's sons Menachem and Yitzhak established another winery in Nahalat Yitzhak. When Yitzhak died in 1960, Menachem continued to manage the family winery on his own. In 1964, Menachem purchased land in Motza, just outside Jerusalem, to accommodate the growing business. A modern winery was established there in 1967. Starting in 2002 the winery began an effort to make more sophisticated wines, moved to kibbutz Tzora, and changed its name to Teperberg 1870.

== Today ==
Managed by Moti Teperberg, Teperberg is now one of Israel's leading wineries, producing over 100 varieties of wine and grape juice. The company markets over four million bottles a year, locally and worldwide. Teperberg has been cited as one of Israel's most notable wineries.

== See also ==
- Israeli wine
