= Dalton Winery =

Winery in Upper Galilee, Israel

- Location: Dalton, Israel
- Coordinates: 33.0176°N 35.491°E
- Wine region: Galilee
- Other labels: Matatia, Alma, Canaan
- Founded: 1995
- First vintage: 1993
- Key people: Guy Eshel, Na'ama Sorkin
- Varietals: Cabernet Sauvignon, Merlot, Shiraz, Barbera, Zinfandel, Chardonnay, Sauvignon blanc, Viognier, Muscat (grape)
- Distribution: Global
- Tasting: free for members, 15 NIS for everyone else
- Website: www.dalton-winery.com

Red canaan
- Type: Wine
- Manufacturer: Dalton winery
- Distributor: Hacarem
- Origin: Galilee, Israel
- Introduced: 2010
- Alcohol by volume: 14%
- Colour: Red
- Flavour: Slightly
- Ingredients: Cabernet Sauvignon, Merlot, Petite Sirah and Shiraz
- Website: Red canaan - Dalton Winery

White canaan
- Type: Wine
- Manufacturer: Dalton winery
- Distributor: Hacarem
- Origin: Galilee, Israel
- Introduced: 2010
- Alcohol by volume: 12.2%
- Colour: White
- Flavour: Sweet
- Ingredients: Sauvignon Blanc, Muscat of Alexandria and Chardonnay
- Website: White Canaan - Dalton Winery

Cabernet Sauvignon
- Type: Wine
- Manufacturer: Dalton winery
- Distributor: Hacarem
- Origin: Galilee, Israel
- Alcohol by volume: 13.5%
- Colour: Red
- Flavour: Rich
- Ingredients: pH – 3.58%
- Website: Cabernet Sauvignon - Dalton Winery

Shiraz
- Type: Wine
- Manufacturer: Dalton winery
- Distributor: Hacarem
- Origin: Galilee, Israel
- Alcohol by volume: 14.7%
- Colour: Red
- Flavour: Slightly
- Ingredients: Shiraz grapes, pH – 3.67%
- Website: Shiraz

Merlot
- Type: Wine
- Manufacturer: Dalton winery
- Distributor: Hacarem
- Origin: Galilee, Israel
- Alcohol by volume: 13.7%
- Colour: Red
- Flavour: Slightly
- Ingredients: Merlot grapes, pH – 3.40%
- Website: Merlot - Dalton Winery

Shiraz Reserve
- Type: Wine
- Manufacturer: Dalton winery
- Distributor: Hacarem
- Origin: Galilee, Israel
- Alcohol by volume: 14.6%
- Colour: Red – Nearly black
- Ingredients: 90% Shiraz, 10% Viognier Loveland, pH – 3.6%
- Website: Shiraz Reserve - Dalton Winery

Cabernet Sauvignon Reserve
- Type: Wine
- Manufacturer: Dalton winery
- Distributor: Hacarem
- Origin: Galilee, Israel
- Alcohol by volume: 14.3%
- Colour: Red
- Ingredients: Cabernet Sauvignon grapes, pH – 3.57%
- Website: Cabernet Sauvignon Reserve - Dalton Winery

Sauvignon Blanc Reserve
- Type: Wine
- Manufacturer: Dalton winery
- Distributor: Hacarem
- Origin: Galilee, Israel
- Alcohol by volume: 13.5%
- Colour: Greenish – Nearly clear
- Ingredients: Sauvignon Blanc grapes, pH – 3.57%
- Website: Sauvignon Blanc Reserve - Dalton Winery

Viognier Reserve
- Type: Wine
- Manufacturer: Dalton winery
- Distributor: Hacarem
- Origin: Galilee, Israel
- Alcohol by volume: 13.8%
- Colour: White
- Ingredients: Viognier grapes, pH – 3.33%
- Website: Viognier Reserve - Dalton Winery

Rosé
- Type: Wine
- Manufacturer: Dalton winery
- Distributor: Hacarem
- Origin: Galilee, Israel
- Alcohol by volume: 13.5%
- Colour: Pink
- Flavour: Slightly sour and tingling
- Ingredients: Cabernet Sauvignon grapes, pH – 3.45%
- Website: Rosé - Dalton Winery

Moscato
- Type: Wine
- Manufacturer: Dalton winery
- Distributor: Hacarem
- Origin: Galilee, Israel
- Alcohol by volume: 6%
- Colour: White
- Flavour: Slightly sweetish
- Ingredients: Muscat of Alexandria grapes, pH – 3.2%
- Website: Moscato - Dalton Winery

Matatia 2006
- Type: Wine
- Manufacturer: Dalton winery
- Distributor: Hacarem
- Origin: Galilee, Israel
- Introduced: 2006
- Alcohol by volume: 13.8%
- Colour: Red – Nearly black
- Ingredients: Cabernet Sauvignon, Merlot and Cabernet Franc grapes, pH – 3.68%
- Website: Matatia 2006 - Dalton Winery

Zinfandel
- Type: Wine
- Manufacturer: Dalton winery
- Distributor: Hacarem
- Origin: Galilee, Israel
- Alcohol by volume: 15%
- Colour: Dark purple – Nearly black
- Flavour: Slightly sour and tingling
- Ingredients: Zinfandel grapes, pH – 3.5%
- Website: Zinfandel - Dalton Winery

The Dalton Winery (Hebrew: יקב דלתון) was founded in 1995 by members of the Haruni family who moved to Israel from England. The chief winemaker is Guy Eshel, who replaced Na'ama Sorkin in 2015. The winery releases wines under several labels, and beginning with the 2006 vintage the winery released wines under the Matatia label, destined to become the company's flagship brand, with wines released only in select vintage years as judged by the winemakers. Current production is about 850,000 bottles annually.
