= Kerem Ben Zimra =

Kerem Ben Zimra: כֶּרֶם בֶּן זִמְרָה (Hebrew)
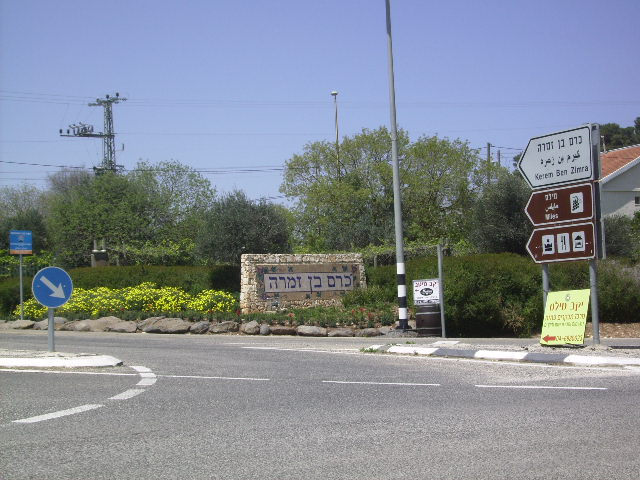
- Village entrance

- Location within Northeast Israel Location within Israel
- Coordinates: 33°2′18″N 35°28′7″E
- Country: Israel
- District: Northern
- Subdistrict: Safed
- Council: Merom HaGalil
- Affiliation: Hapoel HaMizrachi
- Founded: 1949
- Population (2024): 705

Kerem Ben Zimra (Hebrew: כֶּרֶם בֶּן זִמְרָה) is a moshav in northern Israel. Near Safed in the Upper Galilee, it falls under the jurisdiction of Merom HaGalil Regional Council. In 2024, it had a population of 705.

== History ==
The moshav was founded in 1949 by immigrants to Israel from Turkey. Rabbi Meir Yehuda Getz (1924–1995), a kabbalist and the first rabbi of the Western Wall in Jerusalem, was among the founders of the moshav, which was named after Rabbi David Ben Zimra, who was buried with his father Yosef nearby.

New immigrants from Romania and Morocco later joined the moshav.

The moshav is the home of the Rimon Winery.

== Kerem Ben Zimra nature reserve ==
In 1968, a 68-dunam nature reserve was declared on the land south of the moshav. Flora includes Mt. Atlas mastic trees (terebinth), Valonia oaks, Palestine Oaks, Buckthorns, and Styrax officinalis.
