= Daniel Rogov =

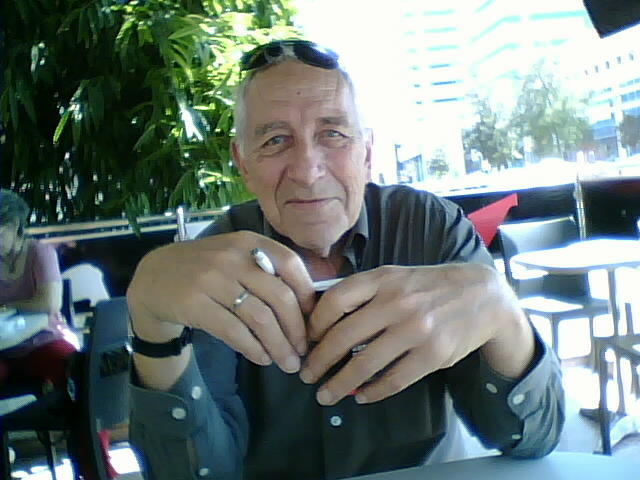
Daniel Rogov

Daniel Rogov (Hebrew: דניאל רוגוב; October 30, 1935 – September 7, 2011) was an Israeli food and wine critic. Rogov wrote Rogov's Guide to Israeli Wines, a series of books on Israeli wine, and was a columnist for both Haaretz and The Jerusalem Post.

== Biography ==
David Joroff (known by his pen name Daniel Rogov) was born in Brooklyn, New York, and grew up in Borough Park. After graduating from high school in the early 1960s, he moved to Paris. He began his career writing food and wine articles for American magazines and newspapers. In December 1976, he moved to Israel and wrote book and restaurant reviews for The Jerusalem Post. In 1984, he began contributing to Haaretz newspaper, where he had a weekly column on food and restaurants, and later added a weekly column on wine as well. In 2010, Rogov retired from his function as restaurant critic of Haaretz but continued to write about wine until his death.

Rogov died in September 2011 from lung cancer. His obituary, which he wrote and posted on his website, says, "This is a difficult letter to write, and that because as it posted it will serve to let forum members, guests, and friends know that I have died." After his death, Carmel Winery released a limited edition of brandy called Rogov Brandy in Rogov's honor.

== Published works ==
Rogov wrote several books on food, wine, and travel, including his series Rogov's Guide to Israeli Wine, described by the Jewish Telegraph Agency as "an authoritative collection of tasting notes and rankings." First published in 2005, the final volume was released posthumously in 2011, and now sells approximately 10,000 copies per year. The bulk of the book contains Rogov's tasting notes on 2500 wines from over 150 Israeli wineries. The guide also includes a history of winemaking in Israel, discussions of Israel's wine regions and vintage years, and an overview of what makes wines kosher. In 2010 and 2011, Rogov also authored Rogov's Guide to World Kosher Wines.

Rogov is also the author of Rogues, Writers & Whores: Dining With the Rich & Infamous, in which he tells the stories of 69 foods and the personalities after whom they were named.
