= Tishbi Winery =

Israeli winery

- Location: Binyamina, Israel
- Coordinates: 32.5823°N 34.9513°E
- Wine region: Shomron
- Founded: 1984
- Key people: Jonathan Tishbi, founder
- Other products: Wine jam, Fruit jam
- Distribution: Global
- Website: www.tishbi.com

The Tishbi Winery (Hebrew: יקבי תשבי), located in Binyamina, is Israel's sixth largest with production of about 1 million bottles of wine annually. Its wines are sold in 25 countries.

The Tishbi family was commissioned by Baron Edmond de Rothschild to plant the first modern vineyard in Israel. In 1984 Jonathan Tishbi founded the Tishbi winery.
