= Dalton, Israel =

Dalton: דַּלְתּוֹן (Hebrew)
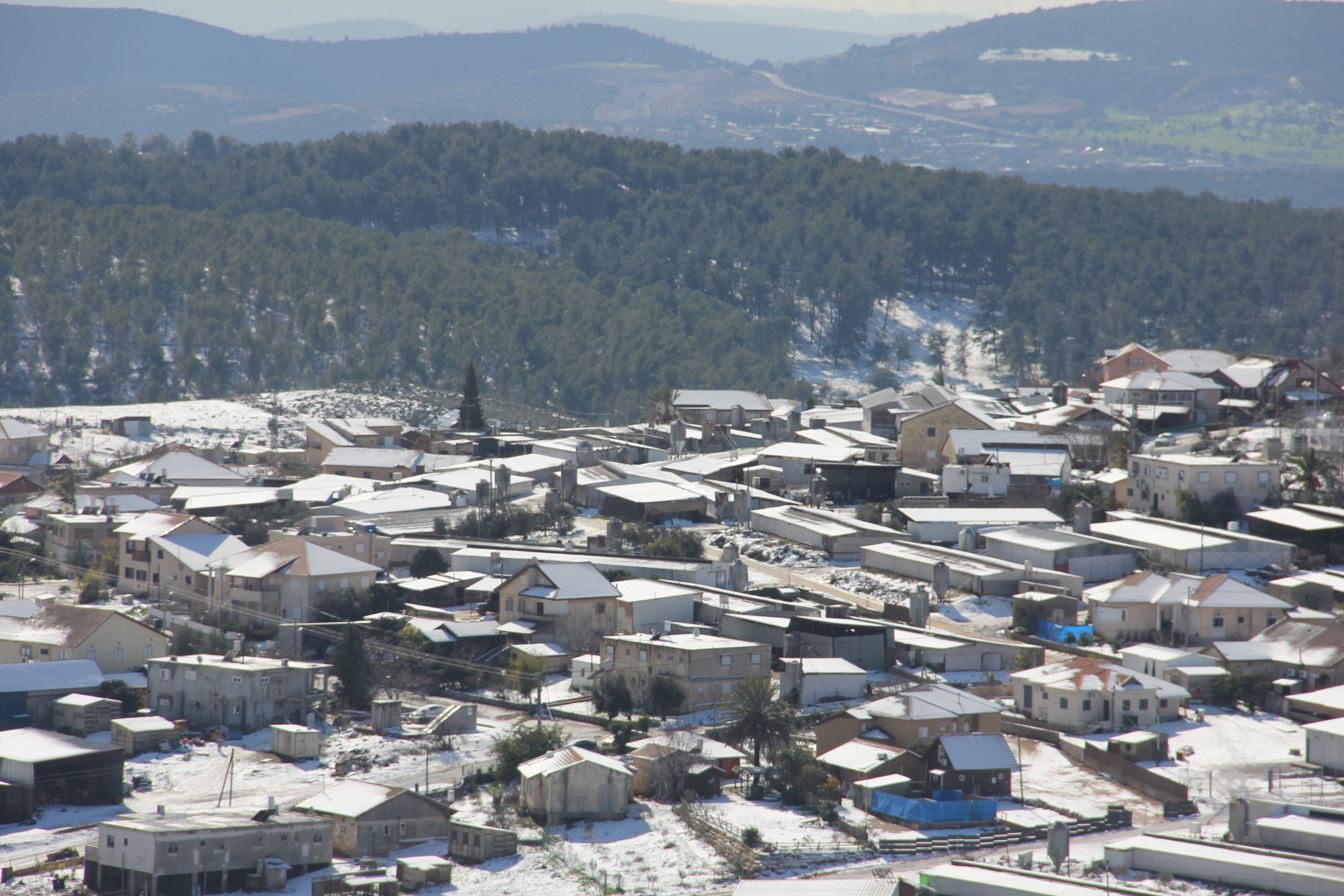

- Location within Northeast Israel Location within Israel
- Coordinates: 33°0′58″N 35°29′15″E
- Country: Israel
- District: Northern
- Subdistrict: Safed
- Council: Merom HaGalil
- Affiliation: Hapoel HaMizrachi
- Founded: 1950
- Founder: Hapoel HaMizrachi
- Population (2024): 1,019

Dalton (Hebrew: דַּלְתּוֹן) is a moshav near Safed in northern Israel under the jurisdiction of Merom HaGalil Regional Council. It was founded by immigrants from Tripoli in Libya in 1950 under the leadership of Hapoel HaMizrachi.

The moshav is built near the ruins of an ancient village of the same name, which was home to a Jewish community during the Middle Ages. On the grounds of the moshav is a tomb ascribed to 2nd century rabbinic sages Jose the Galilean and his son rabbi Yishmael. The economy is based on agriculture, the Dalton Winery and a guesthouse. As of 2024 it had a population of 1,019.

== History ==
Dalton is mentioned in medieval literature and documents discovered in the Cairo Geniza, indicating it was home to a Jewish community during the Middle Ages. In the Geniza there is a portion of a letter sent from Dalton to Egypt which is signed by "Shlomo HaKohen from the city of Dalton, son of Yosef." Also, regarding the wise man Eliyahu HaKohen who died in Tyre in 1063, it is written that all of Israel carried his body on their shoulders to a mountain in the Galilee, to Dalton atop the mountain.

According to Jewish tradition, Tannaim Jose the Galilean (Rabbi Yose HaGelili) and his son rabbi Yishmael are buried in Dalton. The former's ohel is located here. The editors of a Hebrew book "Holy Places and Graves of Righteous Men in the Land of Israel" believe that Yosi Haglili's son is really Rabbie El'azar, a fourth-generation Tanna, and not Rabbi Yishma'el. The mistake apparently derives from the fact that there was also a Tanna named Rabbi Yishmael ben Rabbi Yose, but he was a fifth-generation Tanna. Rabbi Yosi Haglili was a third-generation Tanna at the beginning of the 2nd century CE and was one of the scholars of Yavne.

Dalton was established on land near the Palestinian village of Dallata, which was depopulated in the 1948 Arab-Israeli War. Among the findings found at the site is a marble column inscribed with Hebrew and Aramaic blessings, though only the ends of the lines remain. This column might have been part of a chancel screen within an ancient synagogue.

== Archaeology ==
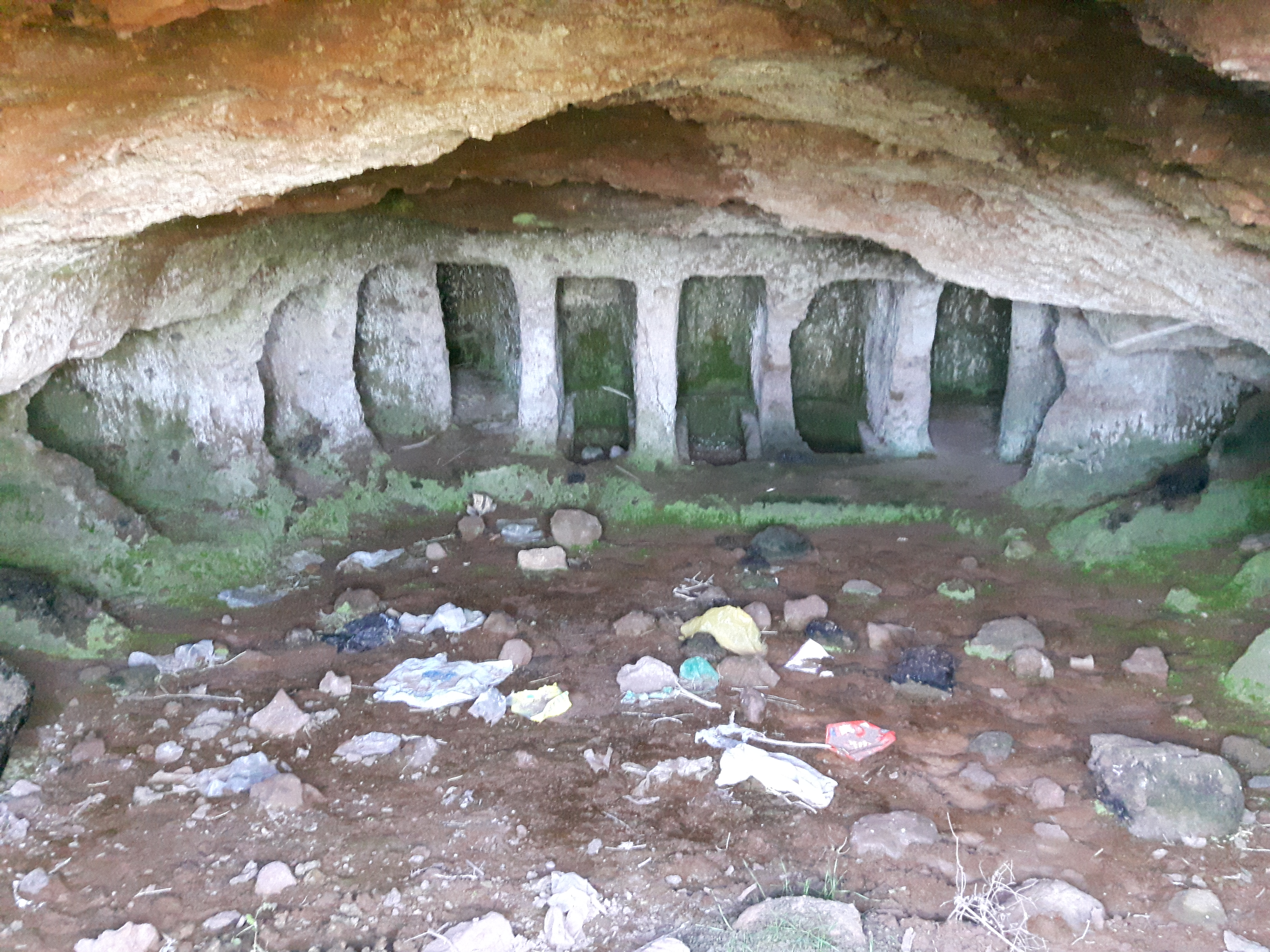
One of many Jewish burial caves on the south slope of Mount Dalton

In a ruin outside the moshav are remnants of an old synagogue. Later a marble pillar was found in the synagogue with an Aramaic inscription which includes text found in other contemporary synagogues. It roughly translates as "The ruler of the world is remembered for good."

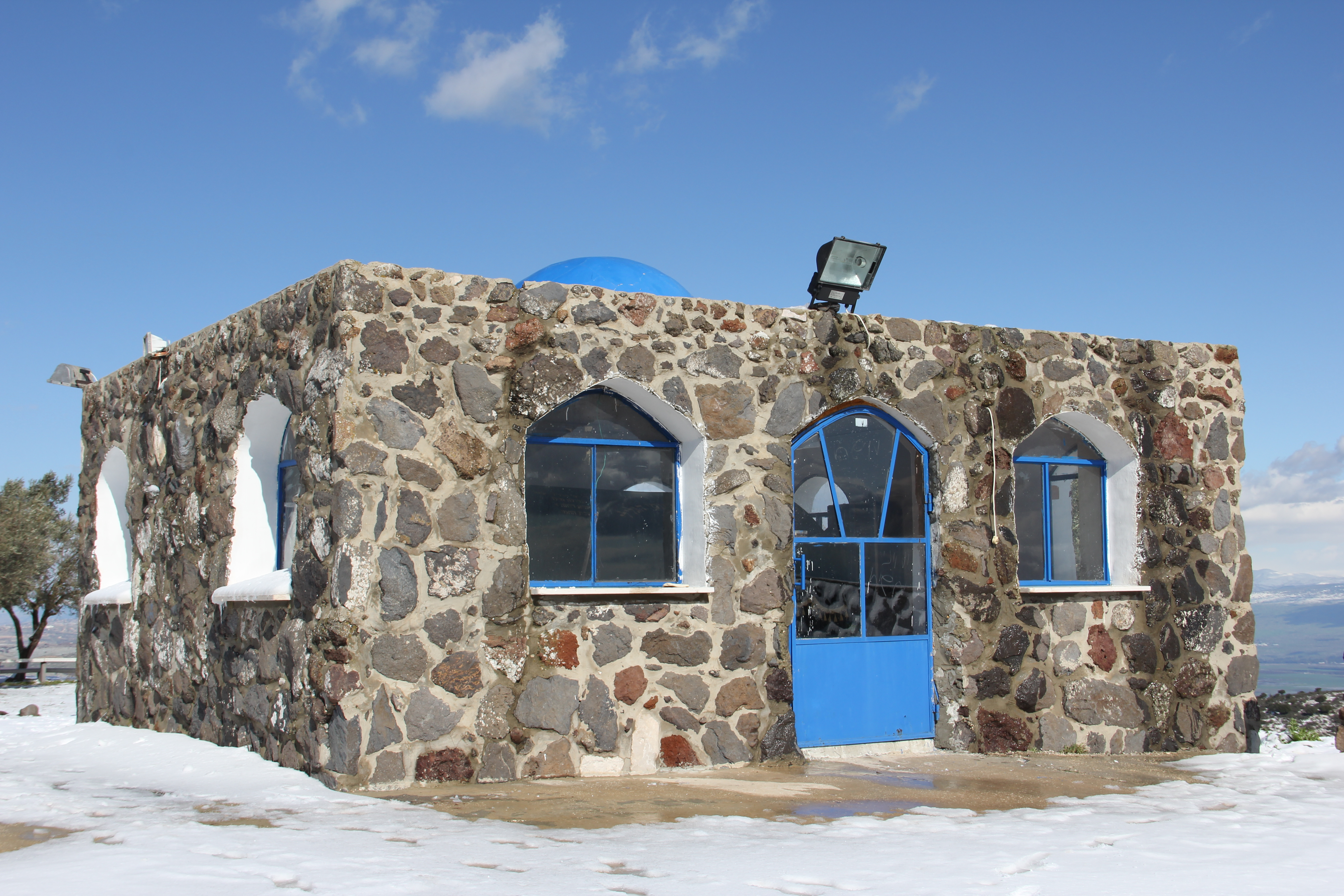
Tomb of Yossi Haglili

In May–June 2006, a salvage excavation was conducted near Moshav Dalton prior to the construction of a communications antenna. The excavation was carried out on behalf of the Israel Antiquities Authority. The site, about 500 m northeast of the moshav 50 m west of the local cemetery, is situated on a rise at the foot of Mt. Dalton, which overlooks the moshav. The excavation area is on the edge of the abandoned Arab village of Dalata. Earlier explorations turned up remnants of a late Roman–Early Byzantine period synagogue. During the Middle Ages, Dalata, as well as the nearby villages of Alma and Baram, were a destination for Jewish pilgrims and was populated with Jews. Dalata was mentioned in pilgrimage literature and a letter discovered in the Cairo Geniza.

== Geology ==
Near the pond in Dalton is a long depression surrounded by hard basalt rocks which appears to be from a secondary explosion of the type found on the slopes of a volcanic mountain. Sometimes volcanic ash expelled in eruptions covers an area with standing water, creating secondary explosions and flows.

== Wine production and enotourism ==
The Dalton winery, which released its first 50,000 bottles in 1993, is now producing 880,000 bottles annually, including Cabernet Sauvignon, Merlot, Sauvignon blanc and Chardonnay. Its vineyards are near the border with Lebanon.

As of 2024, the Ramat Dalton Industrial Park, hosts seven wineries: Adir, Dalton, Feldstein, Luria, Recanati, Rimon (Northern Lake Winery), and Kamisa. These wineries contribute to the area's reputation as a notable destination for wine tourism, which is sometimes referred to as the "Tuscany of Israel." The park provides opportunities for visitors to tour the wineries, sample local wines, explore wine cellars, and appreciate the surrounding vineyards. In addition to wine tourism, the Ramat Dalton area supports agritourism, featuring numerous guesthouses (tzimmers) for accommodation.
