= Goldstar (beer) =

Israeli beer

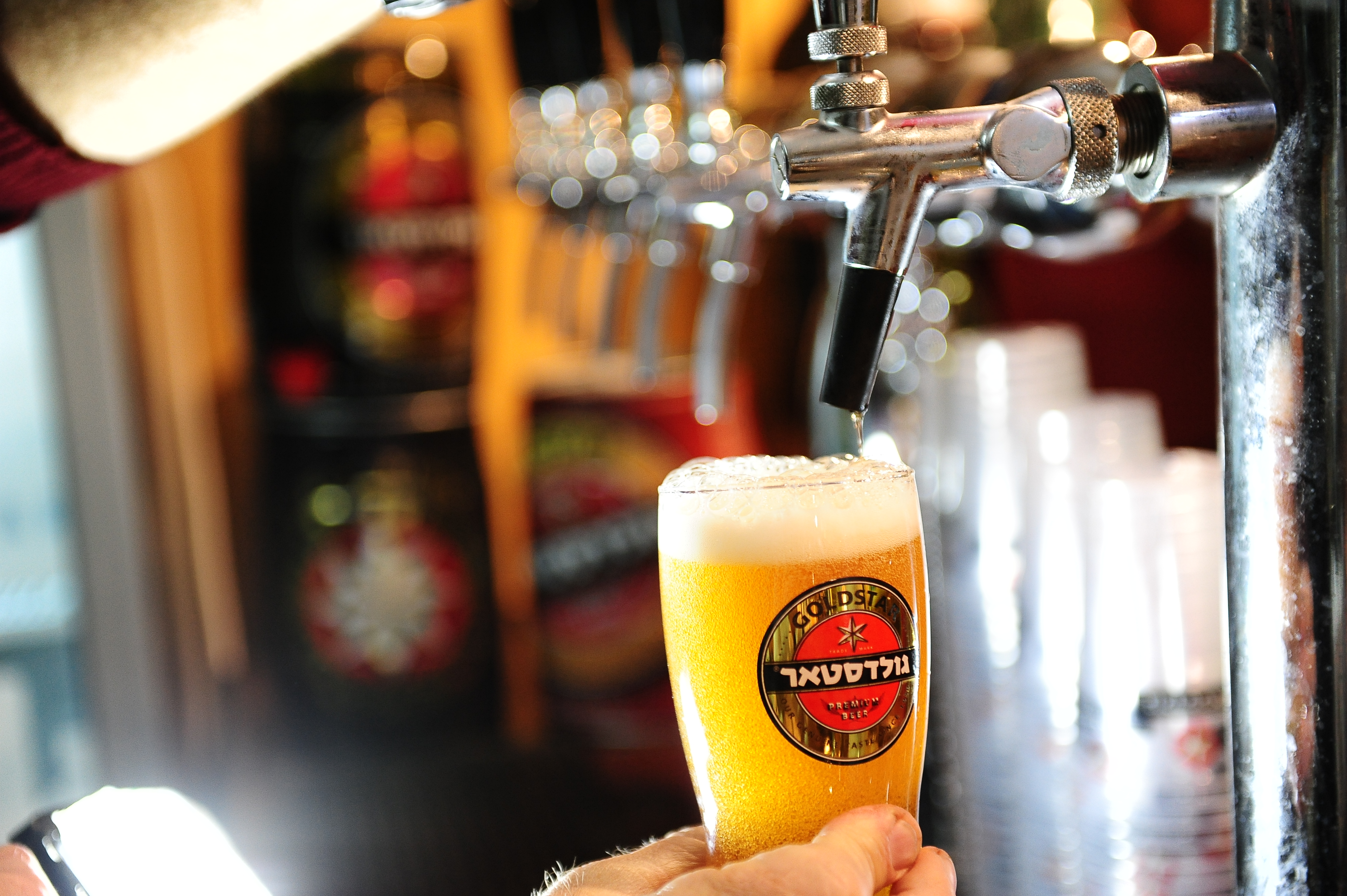
- Goldstar beer from the tap
- Type: Israeli lager
- Manufacturer: Tempo
- Introduced: 1950; 76 years ago
- Alcohol by volume: 4.9%
- Variants: Goldstar Unfiltered, Goldstar Black Roast, Goldstar Light
- Website: https://en.tempo.co.il/brands/gold-star/

Goldstar (Hebrew: גולדסטאר) is an Israeli brand of 4.9% abv lager brewed by Tempo in Netanya, Israel. It is marketed as a dark lager beer, though it is amber in appearance.

== History ==
According to Tempo Beer Industries, Goldstar was developed by brewmaster Menachem Berliner in 1950 and was the first Israeli draft beer. In 1965 "Israeli Beer Industry Ltd" merged with "Leumit Brewery". It was among the products acquired by Tempo in 1985.

Goldstar was initially marketed as a sub-brand of the company's flagship beer, Nesher Beer, and was called "Goldstar Eagle". The familiar eagle of Nesher beer appeared on the label, to which the name Goldstar was added.

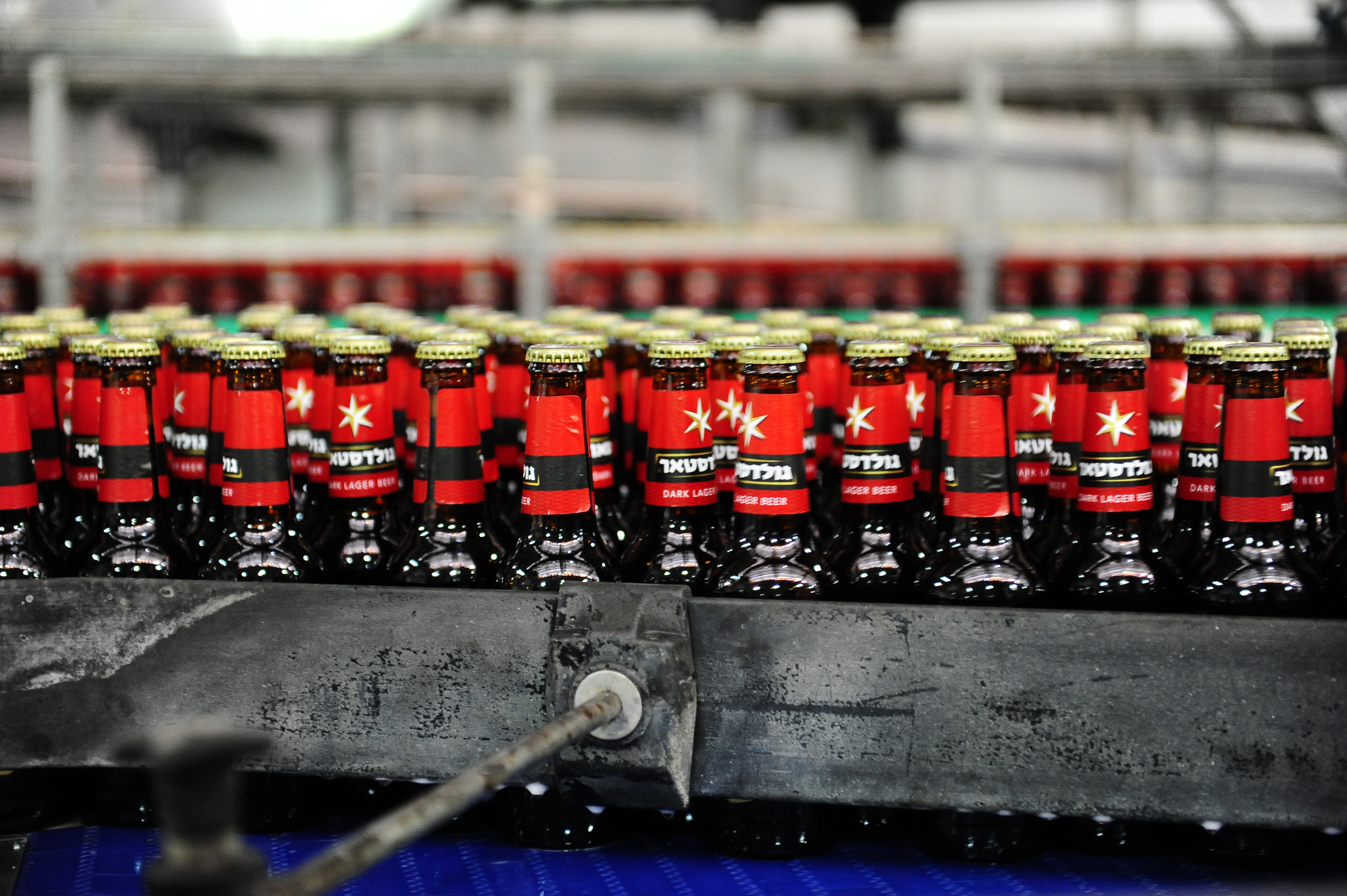

== Name ==
The name of the beer Goldstar and the emblem, a six-pointed star, originate from the emblem of the brewers' guild in the Middle Ages. The star, known as "Bierstern" or "Brauerstern" was the symbol of the guild, and has been stamped since the Middle Ages on beers that were considered pure and high quality.

== Markets ==
Goldstar is considered Tempo's "flagship brand". Certified kosher, it is currently the top-selling beer in Israel.

== Advertising and sponsorship ==
A number of celebrity images have been used to advertise the beer, ranging from Paul Newman to Claudia Schiffer. In 2015, Tempo has faced media criticism for a "sexist" ad.

Goldstar is the title sponsor of the Goldstar Zappa Sound System music festival.

== Reception ==
The Forward called Goldstar and several other beers commonly consumed in Israel "light, easy-drinking beers — the stuff zayde might drink on a hot day". However, Haaretz has referred to Goldstar as "beer few Israelis are proud of".
