= Nesher (disambiguation) =

Nesher is a city in the Haifa District of Israel.

Nesher (Hebrew: נֶשֶׁר) literally meaning "Eagle" may also refer to:

- IAI Nesher, Israeli fighter aircraft
- Nesher Beer
- Avi Nesher, Israeli film producer, film director, screenwriter and actor
- Doron Nesher (born 1954) Israeli actor, writer, screenwriter, poet, director, comedian, radio broadcaster and television host
- Hana Wirth-Nesher, American-Israeli literary scholar and university professor
- Ron Nesher, Israeli rapper, songwriter and composer
- 414th Field Intelligence Battalion "Nesher" of Combat Intelligence Collection Corps (Israel)
