= Prigat =

Juice and syrup manufacturer in Israel

- Industry: Beverage
- Founded: 1940 in Givat Haim, Israel
- Headquarters: Givat Haim (Meuhad) and Givat Haim (Ichud), Israel
- Number of employees: 280 (2006)
- Website: www.prigat.co.il

Prigat (Hebrew: פריגת) (originally called Gat) is a juice and syrup manufacturer in Israel owned by Gat Foods and Israel Beer Breweries. Prigat's headquarters are located in two kibbutzim, Givat Haim (Meuhad) and Givat Haim (Ichud), near Hadera. Prigat is Israel's second largest manufacturer in the juice industry, with 280 employees as of 2006.

== History ==
A grapefruit juice product of Prigat, while under the "Gat" trademark

Prigat was founded in 1940 when the leaders of the Givat Haim kibbutz decided to build a factory for canned fruit and vegetable products. The factory was named "Gat" in 1941 and quickly began the marketing of the company's first products, which were jams, tomato puree and applesauce. The British Army in Mandatory Palestine ordered 775,000 syrup bottles for 55,000 Palestinian pounds in 1943. The company began using mechanical juice extraction in 1947 based on the FMC citrus juice extractor, which finished developing the same year.

=== Post-independence ===
The company began marketing sweetcorn seeds in tin cans in 1957. Then-foreign minister Golda Meir approved the "Jaffa Champion" company trademark for marketing outside of Israel in 1958. The company's peanut factory was established in 1959, and was later separated from the company's juice production, and is not handled by Prigat today. The company's frozen juice and vegetables department was established in 1962.

The company won the best exporter award for 1971. A plastic factory for the six fluid ounce frozen juice and vegetables boxes was established in 1976. The "Prigat" trademark was first used referring to the frozen food department of the company in 1977. The production line for juice in small bags was established in 1982. The production line for juice in paperboard cartons was established in 1987. The company began marketing in Romania in 1993. The production line for squeezed juice was established in 1995. Prigat's merged with Israel Beer Breweries in 2003. El Al flights serves drinks from Prigat.

== International activity ==
Prigat primarily markets in Israel; however, it contains products and/or exports to 15 other countries as well: Australia, Austria, Belgium, Bulgaria, Canada, Ethiopia, France, Ghana, Hungary, Kenya, North Macedonia, Romania, South Africa, Spain, United Kingdom and the US. Prigat overseas export revenue is estimated at US$65.5 million as of 2006, 59.5% of their total revenue.

== Jewish National Fund ==
Prigat has also been involved with the non-profit Jewish National Fund helping to plant trees. The company spent a total of 3 million NIS on treeplanting, of which 2 million square metres of orchards were planted in the Negev area as of 2006. The company sent employees to restore the Birya forest after numerous Katyusha rockets fell in the area following the 2006 Lebanon War.

== See also ==
- Israeli cuisine
- Squash (drink)
- Limonana
