= Israel Beer Breweries =

Israeli beer company

International Beer Breweries Ltd (IBBL) is a brewery founded in 1992 in Ashkelon, Israel as Israel Beer Breweries. It is also known as Carlsberg Israel.

== History ==
The company was founded in 1992 by Central Bottling Company, then Israel's dominant soft drink company, as a way to challenge the near monopoly held by Tempo Beer Industries, beginning by importing Carlsberg Beer. In 2004, IBBL was ranked the second largest company in Israel's beer and cider market, behind Tempo Beer. In July 2008, Carlsberg announced it sold its share of IBBL stock to CBC Group in a deal valued at $80 million.

By 2012, Tempo Beer Industries and Central Bottling Company had become an effective duopoly that was able to raise Israeli prices for beer in unison, with Tempo controlling nearly half the market and Central Bottling about 40%.

Israel Beer Breweries is a subsidiary of Central Bottling Company, which has held the Israeli franchise for Coca-Cola products since 1968.

The brewery is located above an underground aquifer and uses its water in the production process. There are approximately 320 employees.

The brewery is part of the IBBL visitors center, in which visitors tour the brewery and the Carlsberg factory.

IBBL produces Carlsberg Beer and Tuborg Beer. In addition to beer, the company produces "Malty", a non-alcoholic beverage, as well as the "Prigat" brand juice-based drinks and nectars.

== See also ==
- Beer in Israel
- Israeli cuisine
- Israeli wine
- Economy of Israel
