= Givat Haim (Ihud) =

Kibbutz in central Israel

Givat Haim (Ihud): גבעת חיים (איחוד) (Hebrew); جفعات حاييم (إيحود) (Arabic)
- Etymology: Haim's Hill (Union)
- Location within Central Israel Location within Israel
- Coordinates: 32°23′53″N 34°55′54″E
- Country: Israel
- District: Central
- Subdistrict: HaSharon
- Council: Hefer Valley
- Affiliation: Kibbutz Movement
- Founded: 1952
- Founder: Mapai supporters from Givat Haim
- Population (2024): 1,283

Givat Haim (Ihud) (Hebrew: גבעת חיים (איחוד), lit. the hill of life [Khaim's Hill] (Union)) is a kibbutz near Hadera in Israel. It is located within the jurisdiction of the Hefer Valley Regional Council. In 2024 it had a population of 1,283.

== History ==
It was formed in 1952 by an ideological split in kibbutz Givat Haim (founded 1932), with Mapam-supporting members forming Givat Haim (Meuhad) which joined the HaKibbutz HaMeuhad movement, and Mapai-supporting members breaking away to create Givat Haim (Ihud), which joined the Mapai-affiliated Ihud HaKvutzot veHaKibbutzim. Today both kibbutzim belong to the Kibbutz Movement.

== Economy ==
As well as agriculture, the kibbutz is home to Prigat, a major soft drink company in Israel.
