= Golan Heights Winery =

Winery located in the Israeli settlement of Katzrin, Israeli-occupied Golan Heights

- Location: Katzrin
- Coordinates: 32.988°N 35.707°E
- Other labels: Golan, Yarden and Gamla
- Founded: 1983
- First vines planted: 1976
- First vintage: 1984
- Key people: Victor Schoenfeld, winemaker
- Distribution: Global

The Golan Heights Winery (Hebrew: יקבי רמת הגולן) is an Israeli winery located in the Israeli settlement of Katzrin in the Israeli-occupied Golan Heights. It is Israel's third largest winery. In 2012, Golan Heights Winery was named New World Winery of the Year by Wine Enthusiast magazine.

== History ==
The Golan Heights Winery is jointly owned by eight Israeli settlements—moshavim and kibbutzim, which also supply the grapes. Its first vintage was released in 1984. Production in 2008 reached 6 million bottles a year, 30% of which was exported.

The Golan Heights winery markets brands under the Golan, Yarden and Gamla labels and is the parent company of Galilee's Galil Mountain Winery. Golan sources its grapes from sixteen vineyards in the Golan Heights and one vineyard in the Upper Galilee. The chief winemaker is Napa native Victor Schoenfeld.

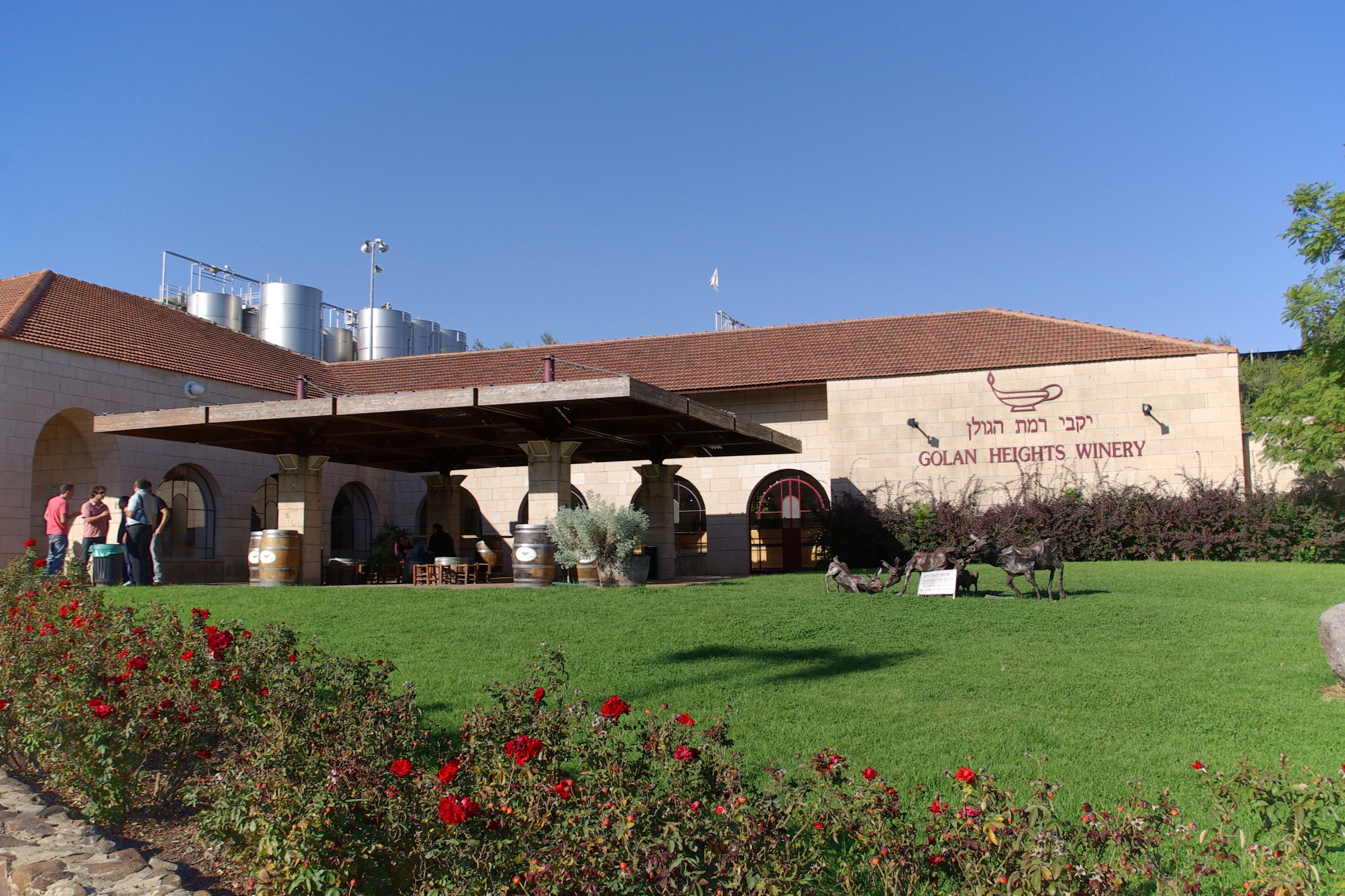
Golan Heights Winery

The winery employs 110 people and incorporates technology using pneumatic membrane presses, must chiller and computer-controlled cooling of stainless steel tanks. The winery also has an "experimental winery" for research and quality control of new wines and improvement of existing lines.

Traditional vinification techniques include barrel-fermented Chardonnay, Methode traditionelle sparkling wines, carbonic maceration for light reds and maturation in French and American oak barrels for premium red and white wines.

The Golan Heights Winery is credited with starting the "quality revolution" in Israeli wine, creating a brand identity for the country's vintages, spurring the creation of new wineries and motivating existing wineries to improve the quality of their wines. Michal Neeman, director of the Israel Export & International Cooperation Institute's food and beverage division, describes the role of the winery as crucial: "Everyone agrees that they were the first winery to produce excellent wine. Then came the boutique wineries, then the medium-sized, and then the large ones. There were a lot of other factors as well, but when you pinpoint the revolution, it started at Golan Heights."

== Swedish labeling dispute ==
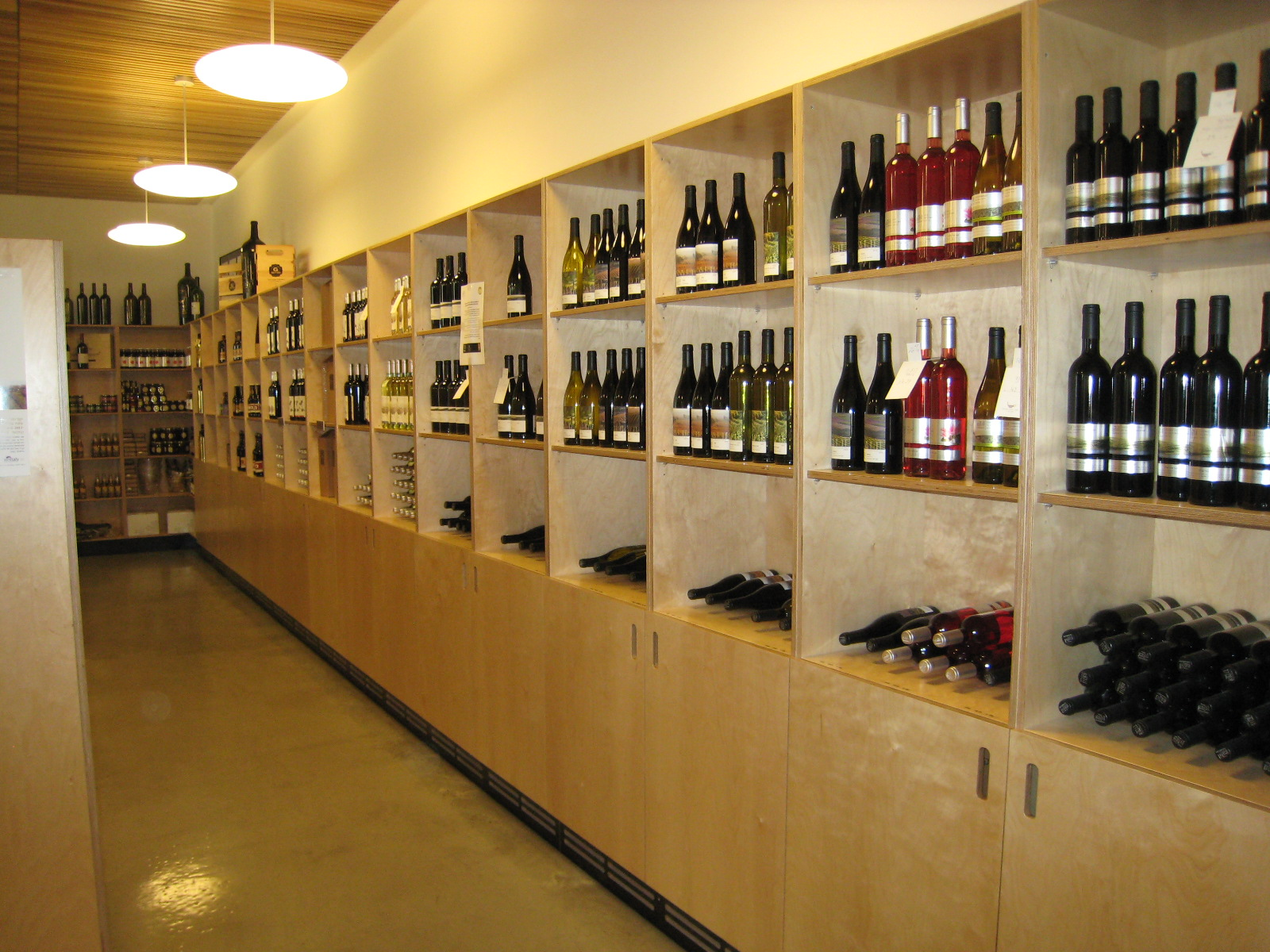
Golan Heights visitors centre

A number of Golan Heights wines were marketed by Systembolaget, Sweden's state-owned monopoly alcohol retailer, as "Made in Israel" on shelves and in the sales catalogue. Following customer complaints and consultation with Sweden's foreign ministry, Systembolaget changed the shelf labeling to read, "Made in Israeli-occupied Syrian territories." However, this prompted complaints from Annelie Enochson, a Christian Democratic politician and officials in Israel. Systembolaget's solution was to remove all reference to the product's country of origin on shelves and in catalogues, classifying the wine as of "other origins."

== Awards ==
The winery has won worldwide acclaim and awards at the most prestigious festivals, including wine shows in France. Golan Heights Winery was named Best Foreign Winery at the Prague Trophy 2008 international wine competition. At a ceremony on January 16, 2009, the winery received the award after winning seven medals at the competition. In 2011, Golan Heights Winery won the Gran Vinitaly Special Award as the best wine producer at the 19th International Vinitaly Wine Competition in Italy. The winery earned two Grand Gold Medals for its 2009 Yarden Chardonnay Odem Organic Vineyard and its 2008 Yarden HeightsWine. Its 2004 Yarden Cabernet Sauvignon was the first Israeli wine to be listed on the Wine Spectator Top 100.

== See also ==
- Golan Brewery
- Israeli wine
- Kosher wine
- List of companies of Israel
