= Golan Brewery =

Brewery in Qatzrin, Golan Heights

- Type: Brewery
- Industry: Alcohol beverage
- Founded: 2006
- Founder: Naftali Pinchevsky, Haim Ohayon
- Headquarters: Qatzrin
- Key people: Nikolaus Starkmeth (brewmaster, 2006–2011); Omri Zilberman (brewmaster, 2011– )
- Products: Beer
- Production output: 130,000 liters/year
- Website: www.golanbrewery.co.il

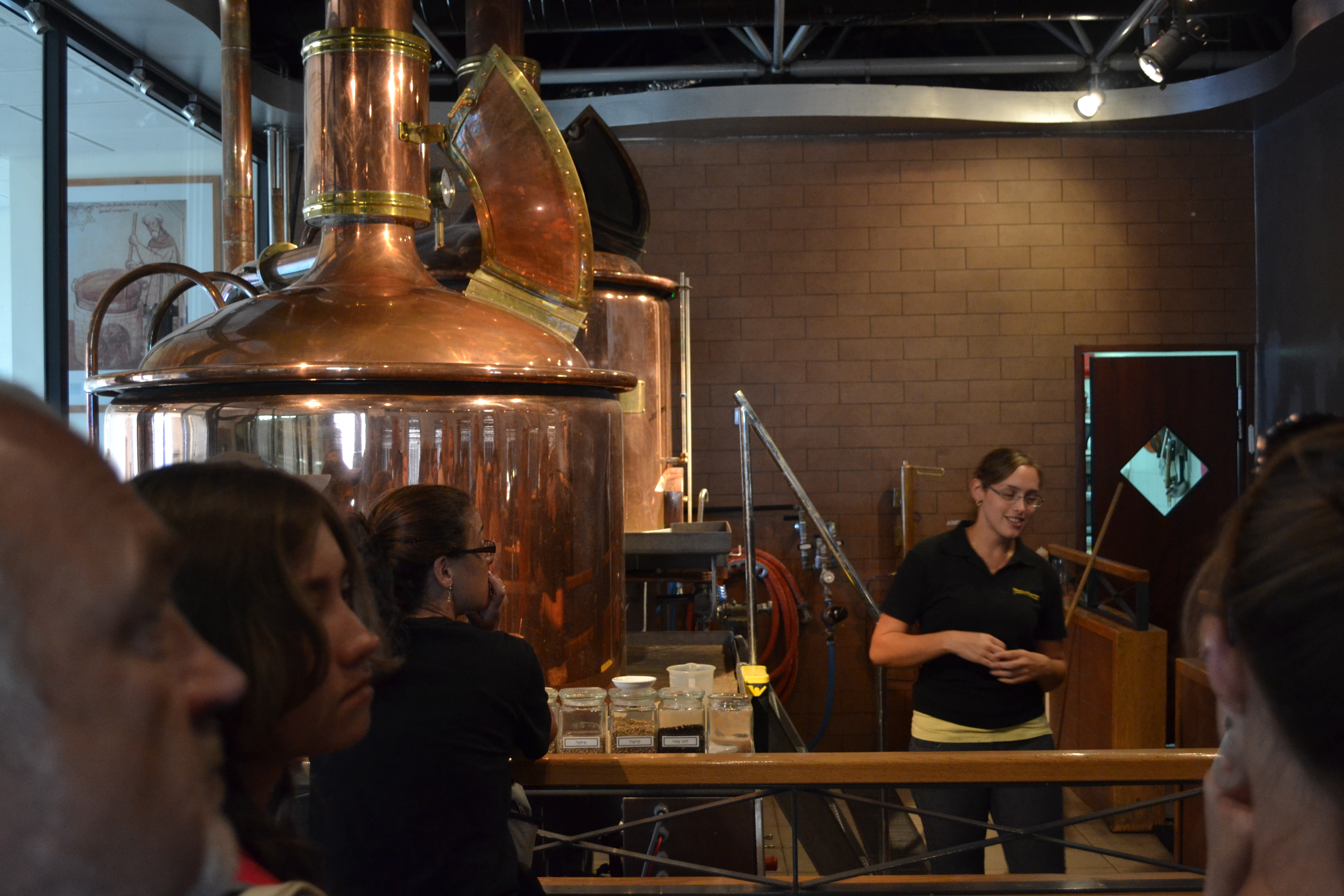
Golan Brewery beer presentation

Golan Brewery (Hebrew: מבשלת הגולן) is a brewery in the Golan Heights settlement of Qatzrin. It won the award for Best Israeli Brewery at the BIRA 2011 competition.

== History ==
Archeological evidence has indicated that beer was produced in the Golan Heights in ancient times. The Golan Brewery, founded in late 2006 by Naftali Pinchevsky and Haim Ohayon, was established with a mind to reviving the region's ancient tradition. Years earlier Pinchevsky was importing homebrewing kits to Israel, but he was ahead of his time and the idea did not catch on. He later established Murphy's bars in Herzliya and Modi'in. Ohayon, a land developer who co-founded nearby Kanaf and who has also invested in the Hapoel Gilboa Galil basketball club and in a local genetics startup, says he is driven by a determination to demonstrate that "even though we are far from the center of the country, we will do it best."

In 2009 the Golan Brewery entered into a strategic collaboration agreement with the Golan Heights Winery, the latter investing ₪3 million ($750,000) in the venture. Ohayon envisioned the joining of forces between the two entities as a vehicle for growing his brewery into the third largest in Israel. In 2012 the Golan Brewery was ranked seventh on a list of Israel's top ten microbreweries.

== Brewery ==
The premises of the Golan Brewery include the brewery itself, a brewpub and a visitor center. The brewpub is frequented by United Nations forces. Visitors can tour the brewery and view the brewing vats, cooling chambers and bottling area. German freelance brewmaster Nikolaus Starkmeth, a former cinematographer, was with the Golan Brewery since its establishment. He was replaced by Omri Zilberman in 2011. The brewery shuts down for the Passover holiday. Its vats are made of copper.

Prior to the Golan Brewery's collaboration agreement with the Golan Heights Winery in 2009, its yearly output was 150,000 bottles per year and the beer had a shelf life of only a few days. As of 2012, the brewery produces 130,000 liters per year. The Golan Brewery's beers were featured at the third Beer & Beyond beer festival in Haifa in 2010. In 2010 the Golan Brewery opened the Golan Brewery Express in downtown Jerusalem for local distribution of its beers on tap. At the BIRA 2011 competition in Ramat Gan, the Golan Brewery won the award for Best Israeli Brewery. National supermarket chain Tiv Ta'am is among the distributors of the Golan Brewery's beers as of 2012.

== Beers ==
In 2007 the Golan Brewery produced four varieties of non-pasteurized German purity law-compliant beer using water from local springs: a German-style wheat beer, a barley lager, a red lager, and a dark lager. The brewery imported its raw hops and malt from Germany and the yeast from Belgium. According to Starkmeth, the water used in the brewing process originates in the Golan's basalt stratum and undergoes a natural process of filtration as it travels through the basalt rocks.

=== Year-round brews ===
In 2010 the Golan Brewery rolled out the Bazelet series, consisting of four hand-crafted brews packaged in retro-themed bottles:

- Bazelet Pilsner – classic pilsner consisting of 3 varieties of malt roasted in Germany, perle hops, and lager yeast; 4.9% ABV, 27 EBUs.
- Bazelet Wheat – Bavarian-style wheat beer consisting of four varieties of malt (70% wheat, rest Bavarian barley) roasted in Germany, select hops, and ale yeast imported from Ingolstadt; 5.1% ABV, 17 EBUs. In the category of best wheat beer, Bazelet Wheat won a gold medal at the BIRA 2011 competition.
- Bazelet Amber Ale – amber ale inspired by German, Belgian and Irish traditions consisting of four varieties of barley malt and one wheat malt all of Bamberg provenance and roasted in Germany, Tettnang hops, and ale yeast imported from Ingolstadt; 6.4% ABV, 22 EBUs. In the category of best ale, Bazelet Amber Ale won a silver medal at the BIRA 2011 competition.
- Bazelet Double Bock – strong dark lager in the doppelbock tradition consisting of five varieties of barley malt of Bamberg provenance, Hersbrucker hops, and lager yeast; 8% ABV, 20 EBUs. In the category of best lager, Bazelet Double Bock won a silver medal at the BIRA 2011 competition. In 2012 it won a silver medal in the category of German-style Doppelbock at the European Beer Star competition in Nuremberg, Germany.

=== Seasonals ===
- Og Jinji – red lager consisting of barley malt, Tettnang and Hallertau hops, and traditional lager yeast; 4.1% ABV, 33 EBUs. Season: late summer, early fall. In the category of best lager, Og Jinji won a gold medal at the BIRA 2011 competition, as well as the award for Best of Pale Lagers.
- Og Summer Ale – IPA consisting of various malts, Hallertau and Citra hops, and ale yeast; 4.5% ABV, 28 EBUs. Season: summer.
- Og Wheat Double Bock – wheat doppelbock consisting of wheat (70%) and barley (30%) malts, Spalt Select hops, and Bavarian wheat yeast; 7.5% ABV, 12 EBUs. Season: winter. The Og Wheat Double Bock was featured at the BEERS 2012 beer expo in Tel Aviv.

== See also ==
- Beer in Israel
