= Yitzhak Ben-Aharon =

Israeli politician (1906–2006)

- יִצְחָק בֵּן אַהֲרוֹן
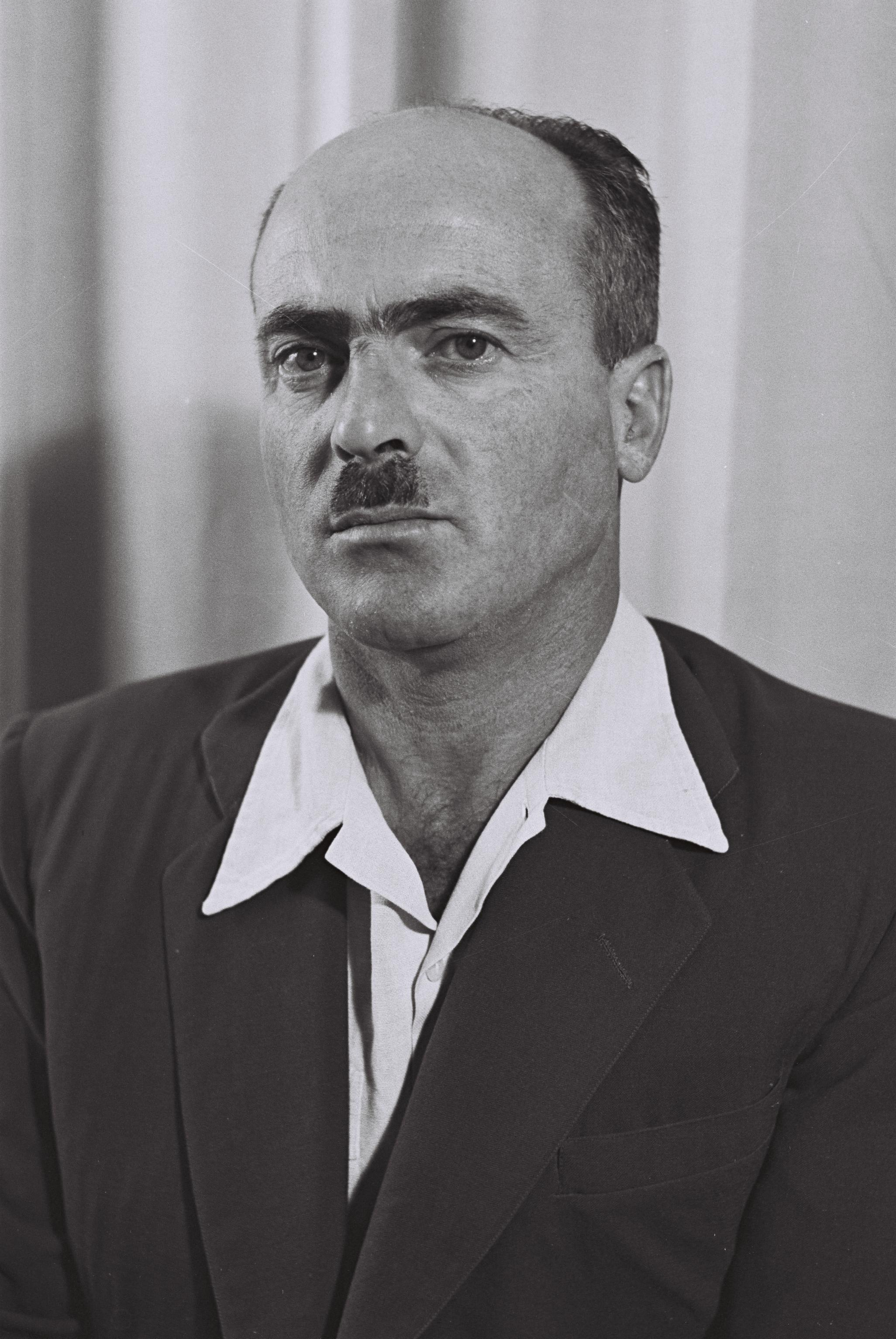

Ministerial roles
- 1959–1962: Minister of Transport

Faction represented in the Knesset
- 1949–1954: Mapam
- 1954–1964: Ahdut HaAvoda
- 1969–1977: Alignment

Personal details
- Born: 17 July 1906 Bosanci, Bukovina, Austria-Hungary
- Died: 19 May 2006 (aged 99) Givat Haim Meuhad, Israel

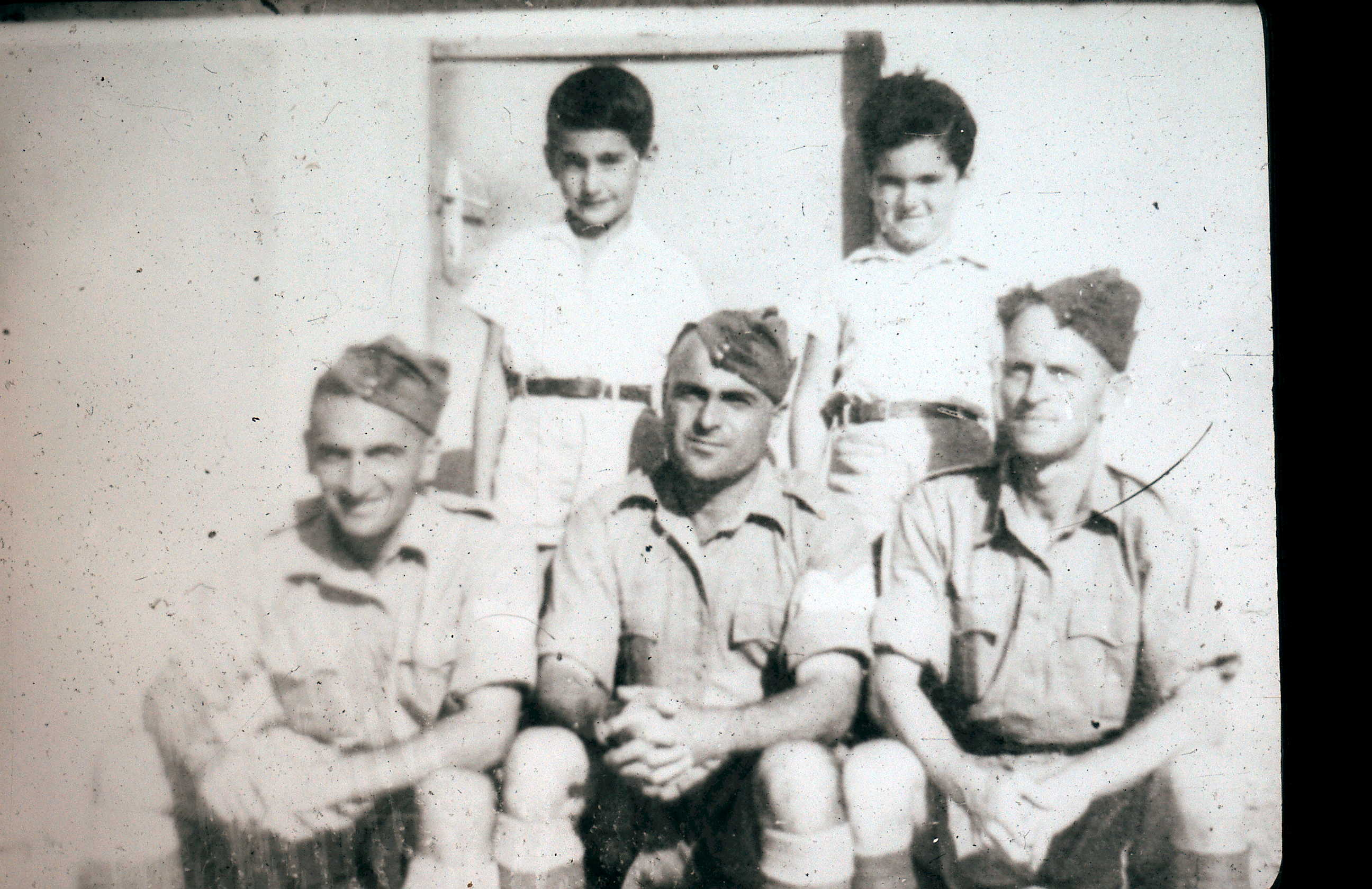
Yitzhak ben Aharon and other members of Kibbutz Givat Haim Meuchad, as British soldiers (between 1940 and 1946)

Yitzhak Ben-Aharon (Hebrew: יִצְחָק בֵּן אַהֲרוֹן, lit. 'Isaac, son of Aaron'; 17 July 1906 – 19 May 2006) was an Austro-Hungarian–born Israeli left-wing politician.

He was a Knesset member from the first to the fifth Knessets and in the seventh and eighth, and a former Minister of Transport and General secretary of the Histadrut. The philosopher Yeshayahu Ben-Aharon is his son.

== Biography ==
=== Early life and career ===
Yitzhak Nussenbaum (later Ben-Aharon) was born in the village of Bosanci, not far from the city of Suceava in the Bukovina region of the Austro-Hungarian Empire (today Romania). His parents, Aharon and Perl, were originally from Galicia. He was their seventh child, and was born when his parents were older, fourteen years younger than his previous sibling. He attended high school in Cernăuţi and studied at the Advanced School for Political Science in Berlin.

He became a leader in Hashomer Hatzair in Romania, and in 1928 he emigrated to Mandate Palestine. In 1933, he became a member of kibbutz Givat Haim and after the 1952 split in the Kibbutz Movement, he joined the Mapam-affiliated Givat Haim (Meuhad), where he remained a member for the rest of his life.

From 1932–38, he was Secretary of the Tel Aviv Workers' Council. In the summer of 1935, he served for a few months as the envoy for the Halutz organization in Nazi Germany until he was expelled by the Gestapo. From 1938–39, he was Secretary of Mapai.

In 1940, he enlisted in the British Army to fight against Nazi Germany in World War II, where he reached the rank of Major. He was captured on the Greek front in 1941 towards the end of the German invasion of Greece, along with other soldiers from the Yishuv, and was a POW until 1945.

=== Political career ===
After the war, he joined Mapam and from 1948 became one of its leaders. After the split in Mapam in 1954, he became one of the leaders of a split that formed the Ahdut HaAvoda party.

He was elected to the Knesset seven times, and member of several parliamentary committees. From 1958 to 1962 he served as Minister of Transport, but resigned over what he called the government's anti-labour socioeconomic policy. In 1964 he resigned from the Knesset to allow Halil-Salim Jabara, one of Ahdut HaAvoda's Arab members, to take his place. From 1969– to 1973 he was General-Secretary of the Histadrut. In 1977 he retired from active political life, but continued to express critical, pro-socialist views for the rest of his life.

He was the author of several books and articles. On 19 May 2006, he died in his kibbutz. Ben-Aharon donated his body to science, so there was no burial.

== Awards and recognition ==
In 1995, Ben-Aharon was awarded the Israel Prize for his special contribution to society and the State of Israel.

Upon learning of Ben-Aharon's death, President of Israel, Moshe Katzav stated that: "Israel has lost one of its builders and shapers of its social character." Prime Minister Ehud Olmert said that "the State of Israel has lost one of its giants, a true zionist and honest ideologue, who during tens of years did not hesitate to express his unique and penetrating views." Israel's Vice Prime Minister, Minister for the Development of the Negev and Galilee, Shimon Peres said that: "One of the spiritual fathers of the Israeli labour movement has left us." The Minister of Defense, Amir Peretz, said: "Today, one the giants of the State of Israel has left us. If there is a man that can be said to have been one of the titans of the generation, it is Yitzhak Ben-Aharon."

== See also ==
- Transportation in Israel
- List of Israel Prize recipients
