= Givat Haim =

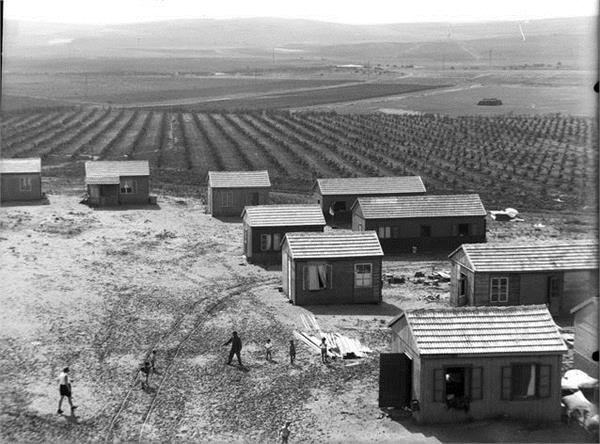
Givat Haim, 1935

Givat Haim (Hebrew: גִּבְעַת חַיִּים, lit. 'Haim Hill') was a kibbutz located around five kilometres south of Hadera in Israel. It split along ideological lines in 1952, creating two new kibbutzim, Givat Haim (Meuhad) and Givat Haim (Ihud).

== History ==
Founded in 1932 by European immigrants, it was originally called Kibbutz Gimel, but was later renamed in honour of Haim Arlosoroff, who was assassinated in 1933. Like Ein Harod, the kibbutz split in 1952 in the wake of ideological differences between supporters of the two main socialist parties, Mapai and Mapam. This created two new and separate kibbutzim: Givat Haim (Ihud), affiliated with Mapai and belonging to Ihud HaKvutzot veHaKibbutzim and Givat Haim (Meuhad), affiliated with Mapam and belonging to HaKibbutz HaMeuhad

== Gallery ==
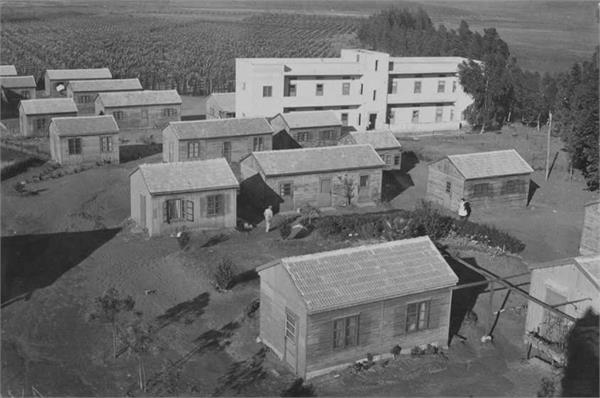
Givat Haim 1936

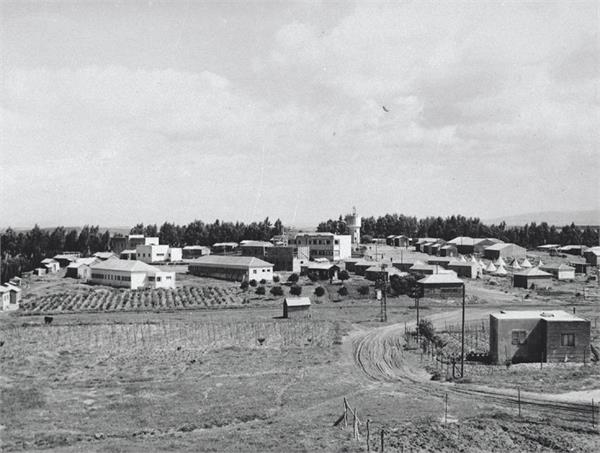
Givat Haim 1939

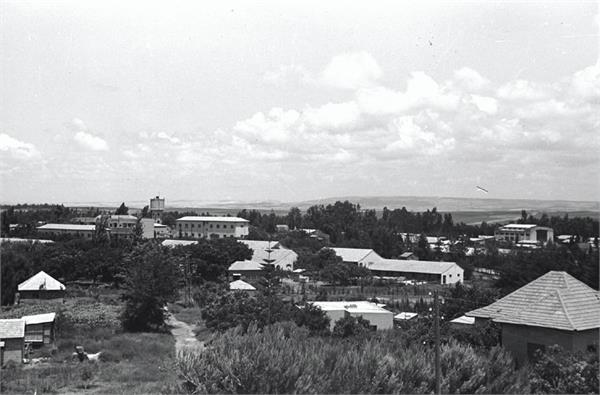
Givat Haim 1947

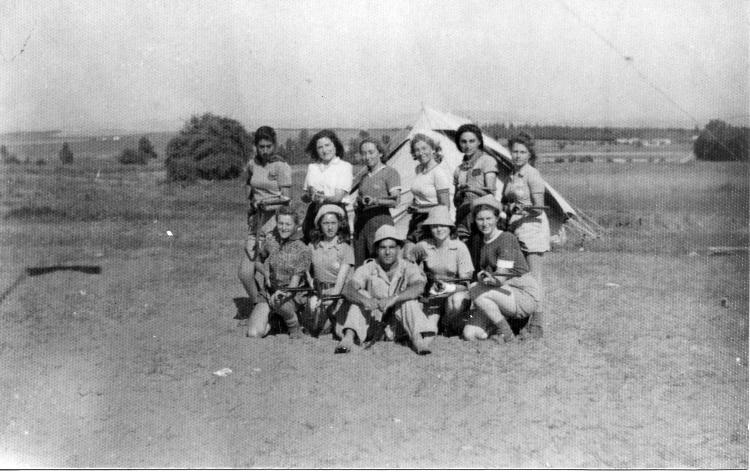
Members of the Maccabi Youth Movement training at Givat Haim in 1948

== Notable residents ==
- Yitzhak Ben-Aharon, Minister of Transport and member of the Knesset for Mapam.
