= Beer in Israel =

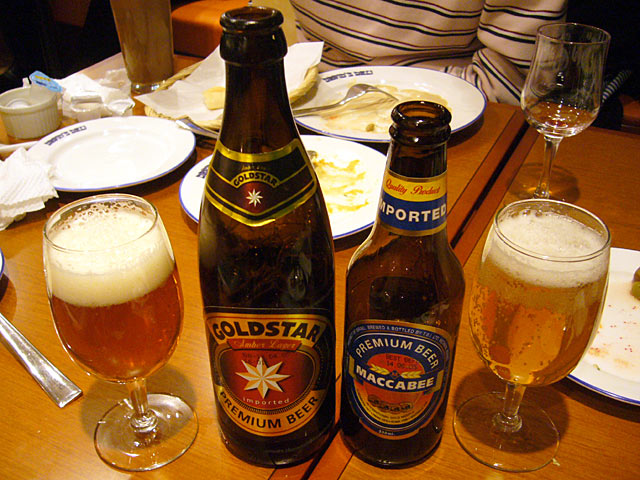
Israeli commercial beers "Goldstar" and "Maccabee" (with bottle labels in English for export), produced by Tempo Beer Industries Ltd.

Beer in Israel is manufactured primarily by two major breweries – Tempo Beer Industries and Israel Beer Breweries. Over the past decade numerous microbreweries have established themselves throughout the country. Beer festivals are held annually in Israel, of which one of the largest is in Jerusalem.

== History ==
Like the Phoenicians, the Greeks and the Romans, the ancient Israelites were far more drawn to wine than they were to beer. After the exile of the Jews to Babylonia in the sixth century BC, they began embracing beer and several rabbis became established brewers. Two notable Babylonian Jewish brewers were Rav Chisda and his pupil Rav Papa, both of whom lived in the vicinity of Sura during the fourth century CE.

In 1934–35 James Armand de Rothschild, identifying a demand for beer on the part of British nationals residing in Palestine, established the first local commercial brewery in partnership with Gaston Dreyfus, in Rishon LeZion. In 1940 the Palestine Brewery (Hebrew: תעשיות בירה א"י) – or, as it was also known, the Nesher Brewery – was commissioned by the AACI to supply beer to Australian troops stationed in Palestine. By 1942 the brewery was compelled to enlarge its plant in order to meet increased demand, generated by both military and civilian consumers.

Construction of what was at the time the largest brewery in the Middle East, the National Brewery, began in April 1952 in the city of Netanya, founded by a group of investors led by Louis Herzberg. Upon completion in May 1953, the National Brewery had an annual production capacity of 400,000 barrels. In 1954 it shipped what was theretofore "[t]he largest single shipment of imported beer ever to enter the United States" – 180,000 bottles of its Abir label beer. The National Brewery merged with the Palestine Brewery and the Galilee Brewery in 1973, whereby it came to control 90% of Israel's beer market. The company was acquired in 1976 by Canadian land developer Murray Goldman for $8 million. In 1980 a canned beer bearing a label indicating its origin as the National Brewery in Netanya was being sold in Egypt in spite of an Egyptian boycott of Israeli products. Called O.K. beer, it proved more successful than Heineken and Tuborg and was consumed at premier bars in Cairo and other locations in Egypt, even as conservative religious Muslim leaders campaigned to ban the sale of alcoholic drinks in the country. After entering into a license agreement with Anheuser-Busch International in 1983 for production of the first American beer in Israel, the National Brewery began producing Budweiser in 1984.

The National Brewery was acquired by Tempo Beer Industries in 1985.

== Breweries ==
In 1926, the first industrial brewery in the Land of Israel was established in Acre, called Max Brau. The entrepreneurs and owners were the brothers Aharon-Zvi (Herman) and Mordechai (Motel) Rosenberg, who had immigrated to the country from Poland two years earlier. The location of the brewery was chosen due to its proximity to the Kaberi springs, which were known for their water quality. The beer produced at the brewery was a Pilsner style. The brewery closed after three years of operation.

Since the 1950s, the Israeli beer industry has been dominated by no more than two companies at a time. Beginning in the 1990s with the establishment of Israel Beer Breweries, it and Tempo Beer Industries control 70% of Israel's beer market. Tempo produces the Goldstar and Maccabee labels, while Israel Beer produces Carlsberg and Tuborg. In addition, around two dozen licensed commercial microbreweries operate in the country.

Netanya-based Tempo is the largest brewery in Israel. In 1999 Tempo's Goldstar and Maccabee beers accounted for 60% of all beer sales in the country. Tempo also imports Heineken and Amstel. Israel Beer Breweries entered the market in 1991–92 as a partnership between Carlsberg Group and the local Coca-Cola company. In 1996 it began distributing Guinness. Israel Beer Breweries operates a beer-themed visitor center in Ashkelon.

=== Craft and boutique beer ===
Craft brewing began to develop midway through the first decade of the 2000s. Journalist Shai Cooper, along with brewer Gadi Deviri, founded the 'Israeli Beer Club' in 2002, unofficially uniting most of the homebrewers in Israel at the time. The two also organized several homebrewing competitions, initially attended by a few brewers, but already in the third edition, dozens of contestants participated. Many of them, such as Uri Shagai from Alexander Brewery, David Cohen from Dancing Camel Brewery, the Shapira brothers from Shapira Brewery, Asaf Levi who founded Malka Brewery, and brewers who later founded additional boutique breweries, all took part and later became owners of their own boutique breweries. At one point, Tempo Beer Industries sponsored Cooper and Deviri's homebrewing competition and the Israeli Beer Club, under the name 'Samuel Adams Long Shot', similarly to the competition in the United States. Later on, Shai Cooper himself founded a homebrewing competition called the 'Stout Challenge', along with the Carlsberg Brewery in Ashkelon.

The Dancing Camel Brewery, which opened in Tel Aviv in 2006, was the first microbrewery to open in Israel. Later that year the Golan Brewery opened up in the Golan Heights region of Israel. Jem's Beer Factory, Israel's first kosher microbrewery, opened in Petah Tikva in 2009. By the end of 2009 there were microbreweries operating from Dekel and Qiryat Gat in Israel's south; through Sal'it, Petah Tikva and Tel Aviv; up to Haifa, the Jezreel Valley, Ramot Naftali, and Yehi'am; and as far as Qatzrin in the Golan Heights. 2010 was an especially active year for new microbreweries.

Name	Location	Foundation	Brand	Notes
Dancing Camel Brewery	Tel Aviv	2006	Dancing Camel	Closed in 2022
Bira Malka	Migdal Tefen	2006	Malka	
Golan Brewery	Katzerin	2006	Bazelet, Oog	
Isis Brewery	Dekel	2007	Isis	
Lone Tree Brewery	Kfar Etzion	2009	Lone Tree	Defunct. Kosher microbrewery founded by David Shire.
Libira Brewery	Haifa	2007	Libira	
Negev Brewery	Kiryat Gat	2008	Negev	Merged with Malka Brewery in 2016
Salara Brewery	Gan Yavne	2008	Salara	
Oak and Fire	Beit Shemesh	2008	Esh, A-bir	Closed in 2019
Jem's	Petah Tikva	2009	James	brewery closed, but the brand is still produced and sold in chain restaurants.
HaAm Brewery	Even Yehuda	2009	HaDovim	Closed in 2015, and later the HaDovim brand was produced by HaAretz Brewery.
Alexander Beer	Emek Hefer	2010	Alexander Beer	
Shita Brewery	Arad	2010	Shita	
Shapiro Beer	Atsor	2011	Shapiro Beer	
Galil Brewery	Kibbutz Moran	2011	Galil	
Shrigim Brewery	Shrigim-Leon	2011	Emeq HaEla, Ronen	
Midan Brewery	Carmiel	2013	Midan	Non gluten beer

== Beers ==
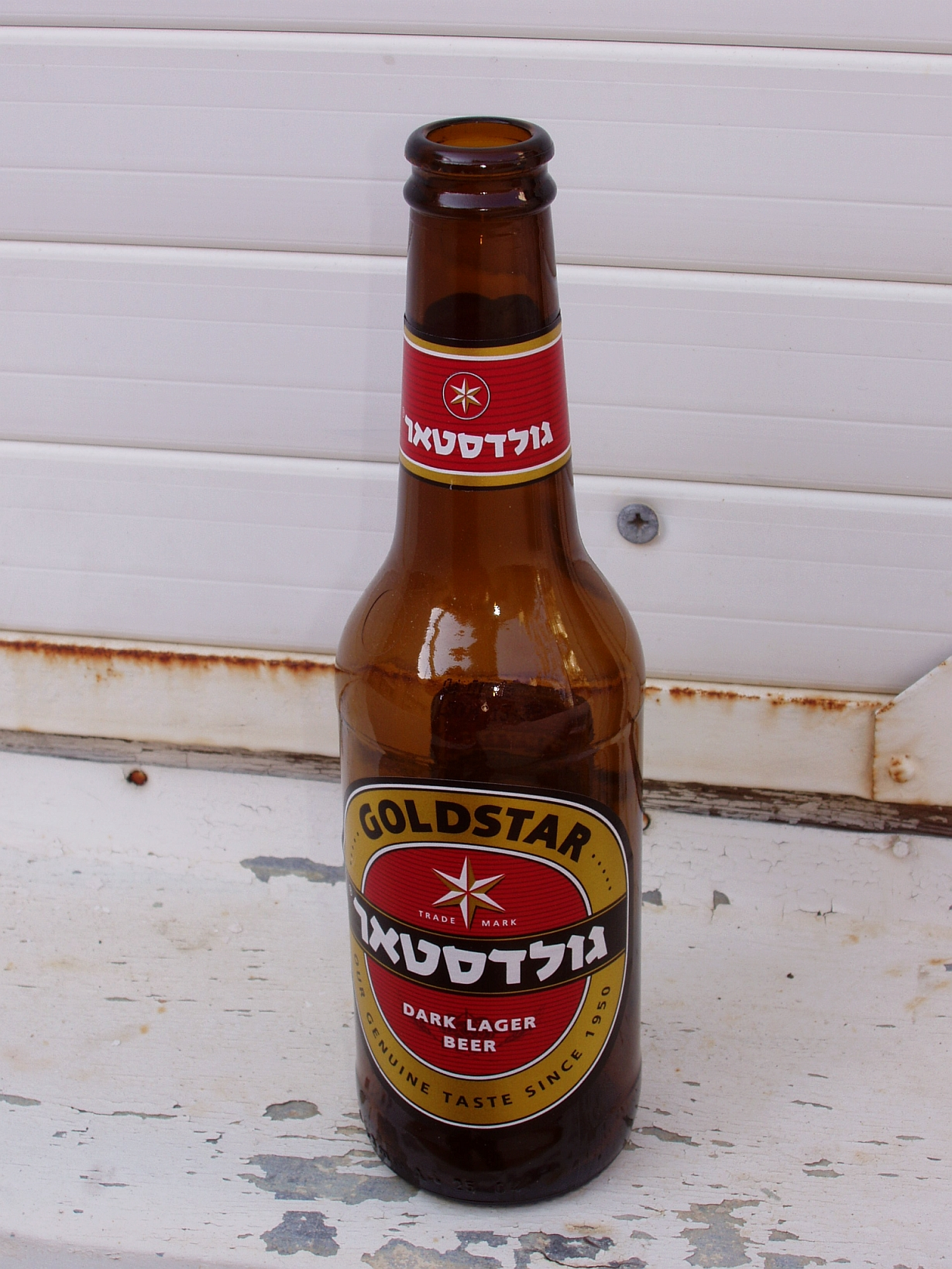
A bottle of Goldstar Dark Lager, an Israeli beer

The first native beer label to emerge in what would soon become the State of Israel was Nesher, in the 1930s. In its early years it was the leading beer label locally and was produced in quantities of 10,000 liters per year. Two varieties of Nesher were available at that time – a pilsner lager and a malt beer. Nesher Malt continues to be known in Hebrew as bira shechora ("black beer").

Goldstar, a pale lager brewed in Israel since 1950, was originally produced at the Cabeer Brewery in Rishon LeZion. In the years between 1952 and the mid-1980s a popular beer brewed in Israel was Abir. Maccabee, a pilsner invented by brewmaster Menachem Berliner, was introduced in 1968 and competed with Goldstar for market share until the 1970s. Goldstar and Maccabee were acquired in 1975 by a single partnership and were sold to Tempo in 1986. Goldstar won a Monde Selection gold medal in 2007, and in 2011 it won an Israeli Product of the Year award.

The brews produced by the Dancing Camel microbrewery are adapted to accommodate Israel's palate which, according to founder David Cohen, eschews bitter flavors. Thus the Dancing Camel IPA offsets the bitterness of its hops with silan, a syrup extracted from dates. Dancing Camel also produces seasonal beers inspired by the Jewish holidays: for Rosh Hashanah Dancing Camel releases a pomegranate beer, and for Sukkoth a wheat beer made with etrog.

== Culture ==
=== Bars ===
The first Irish pub in Israel was Molly Bloom's, which opened in central Tel Aviv in 2000 as a partnership between Israel Beer Breweries and an Irish entrepreneur. By 2004 there were Irish pubs in Tel Aviv, Herzliya, Rehovoth, and Glilot. Porter and Sons in Tel Aviv, which opened in 2010, has the most beers on tap of any establishment in Israel – 50 as of 2012. In the category of Best Beer Restaurant in Israel, Beers.co.il awarded Porter and Sons first place in 2012. In June 2012 a new bar was opened next to Shuk HaCarmel called Beer Bazaar. They serve over 80 Israeli beers, more than 10 Israeli ciders and also have their own beer on tap.

=== Festivals ===
The Jerusalem Beer Festival is one of the largest beer festivals in Israel, held annually in the summer since 2004. The festival is held for two days usually between August 28–29. Other festivals are held in Tel Aviv, Haifa and the Mateh Yehuda region. A wine and beer festival is held annually in Beer Sheva. The city of Ashdod held its first beer festival in 2011.

=== Israeli Beer Club ===
In 2002 the Israeli Beer Club was established by Shai Cooper and Gadi Deviri in order to promote the culture of beer in Israel and specifically to serve as a platform for helping small-scale brewers and importers to get their products onto the market. The club offers homebrewing and beer tasting workshops and is involved in organizing beer competitions.

=== Beer communities on the internet ===
At the end of the second decade of the 21st century, there was significant activity on the internet centered around local beer brewers and the import of beers from abroad. The communities, led by the Facebook group "One Beer a Day" have driven producers and importers to significantly increase the variety of beers in the country, as well as to introduce the production of new styles that have been revealed to the growing audience.

== Economy ==
In 1937, in an effort to protect the local brewing industry from competition issuing from neighboring breweries in Syria and Lebanon, the British High Commissioner for Palestine ordered a tariff of 10 mils on each liter of imported beer.

In the late 1990s beer sales in Israel totaled $100 million, of which Tempo accounted for 73%. The malt beverage industry generated a separate $10 million in sales. Between 1992 and 1997 the share of international labels in the market grew from 9% to 36%, with a concomitant decline in the share of domestic labels over the same period from 91% to 64%. The value of Israel's beer market was estimated at ₪1.2 billion in 2009. Its size in 2010 was estimated at 950,000–1,000,000 hectoliters, up from 800,000 in 2005.

With a strong local economy the alcoholic drinks market in general is growing within Israel, with particular growth in beer sales. The leading beer companies, such as Tempo Beer Industries and Israel Beer Breweries, launched new beer brands in 2007, with the most significant introductions being Goldstar Light, Tuborg T and Samuel Adams. Goldstar and Maccabee are the overall leading brands in Israel. Over 75% of beer sales in Israel are from off-sales locations such as supermarkets, rather than bars.

In 2012 Israel's finance minister signed an order to raise the purchase tax on beer from NIS2.18 to NIS4.19 per liter. The move was opposed by Eli Yishai of the Shas party, who said it would have fatal repercussions vis-a-vis Israel's local boutique breweries.

== Kashrut ==
According to Ludwig Horlein of the Hartmannsdorf Brewery in Germany, with respect to ingredients there is no difference between kosher and non-kosher beer. In general, observant Jews will only drink unflavored beers without a kosher certification (compared to flavored beers, which do require a kosher certification). But according to Israeli beer expert Gad Deviri, kosher certification is not a consideration for many observant Jews in Israel. However, while unflavored beers with no additives are acceptable even without Kosher certification, some beers may contain additives that are not kosher. It is also generally accepted that, as a beverage made with grains such as barley, beer is considered chametz and never kosher for Passover.

== Links ==
One Beer a Day - Facebook community

== See also ==
- Beer and breweries by region
- Beer in Palestine
