= Tempo Beer Industries =

Israeli brewer

Tempo Beer Industries Ltd.

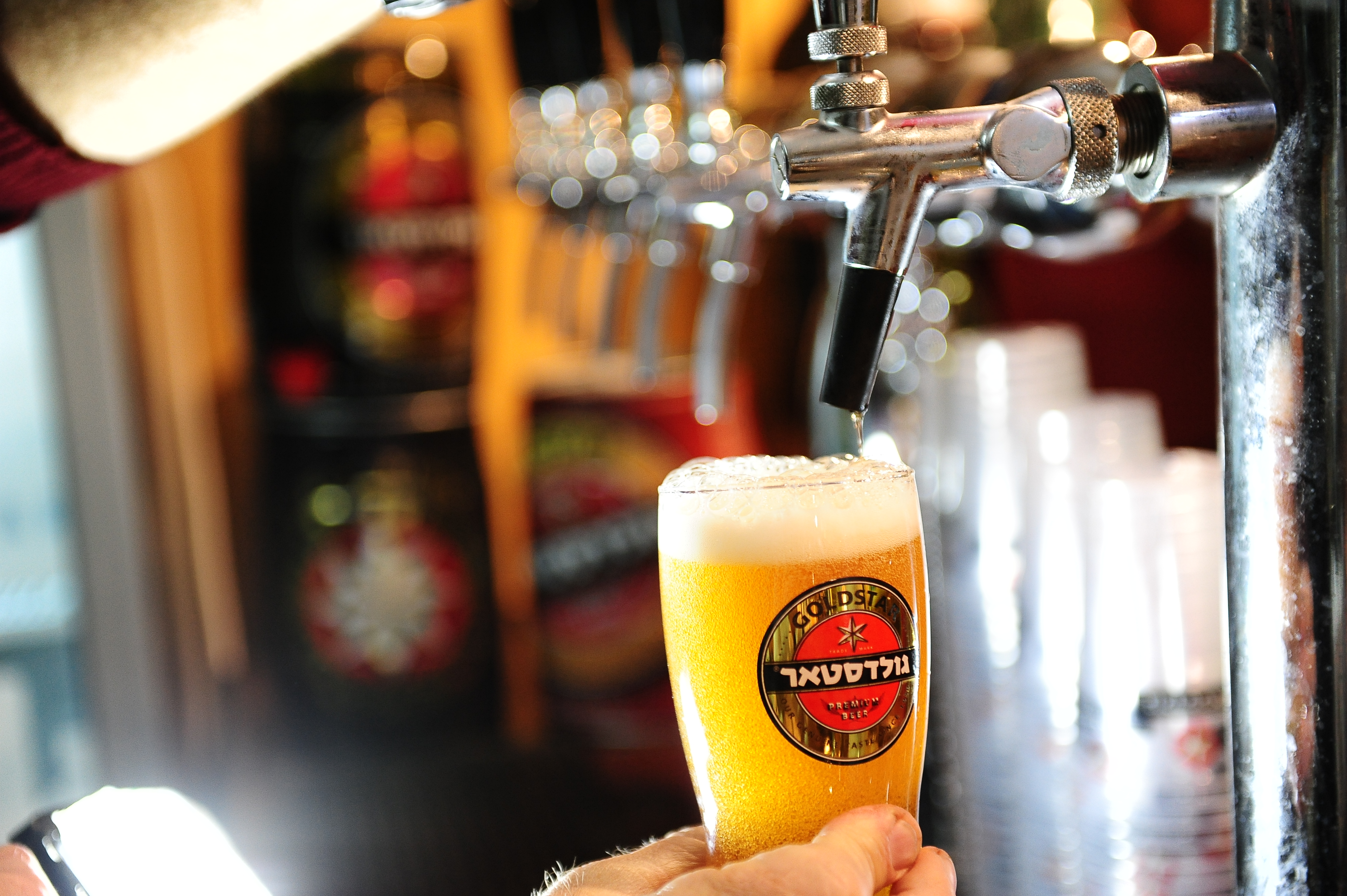
- Goldstar beer
- Location: Netanya, Israel
- Opened: 1952
- Annual production volume: 500,000 hectolitres (430,000 US bbl)
- Owned by: Publicly traded since 1982 on the Tel Aviv Stock Exchange
- Website: en.tempo.co.il

Active beers
Name	Type
Maccabee	Pilsner
Goldstar	Pale lager
Goldstar Unfiltered	Kellerbier
Eagle Premium	Pale lager
Eagle Strong	Amber lager
Nesher	Pale lager
Nesher Malt	Schankbier

Tempo Beer Industries (Tempo) is Israel's largest brewer and the country's second-largest beverage company.

== Products ==
=== Beers ===
Tempo produces three brands of pale lager:

- Goldstar, which was acquired in a 1985 merger
- Maccabee, also marketed in the United States and Europe
- Nesher Malt, brewed in both alcoholic and non-alcoholic versions

Goldstar (Hebrew: גולדסטאר) is a 4.9% ABV pale lager which has been produced since the 1950s. It is marketed as a dark lager beer ("בירה לאגר כהה"), though it is pale golden in appearance. In January 2007, Tempo introduced 4% Goldstar Light with a commercial starring Moshe Datz, from the Israeli duet Duo Datz. The beer is certified kosher by the Chief Rabbi of Netanya, Israel.

Maccabee (Hebrew: מכבי) is a 4.9% ABV pale lager that was first brewed in 1968. It is distributed in Israel and is also marketed in the United States and Europe.

Nesher Malt was the first commercial beer to be brewed in Israel. It is produced in both alcoholic and non-alcoholic styles, and has been brewed since 1935.

By 2012, Tempo Beer Industries and Central Bottling Company had become an effective duopoly that was able to raise Israeli prices for beer in unison, with Tempo controlling nearly half the market and Central Bottling about 40%.

=== Soft drinks ===
Tempo produces juice-based drinks under the Jump brand and is also the local bottler of PepsiCo soft drinks.

== Distribution ==
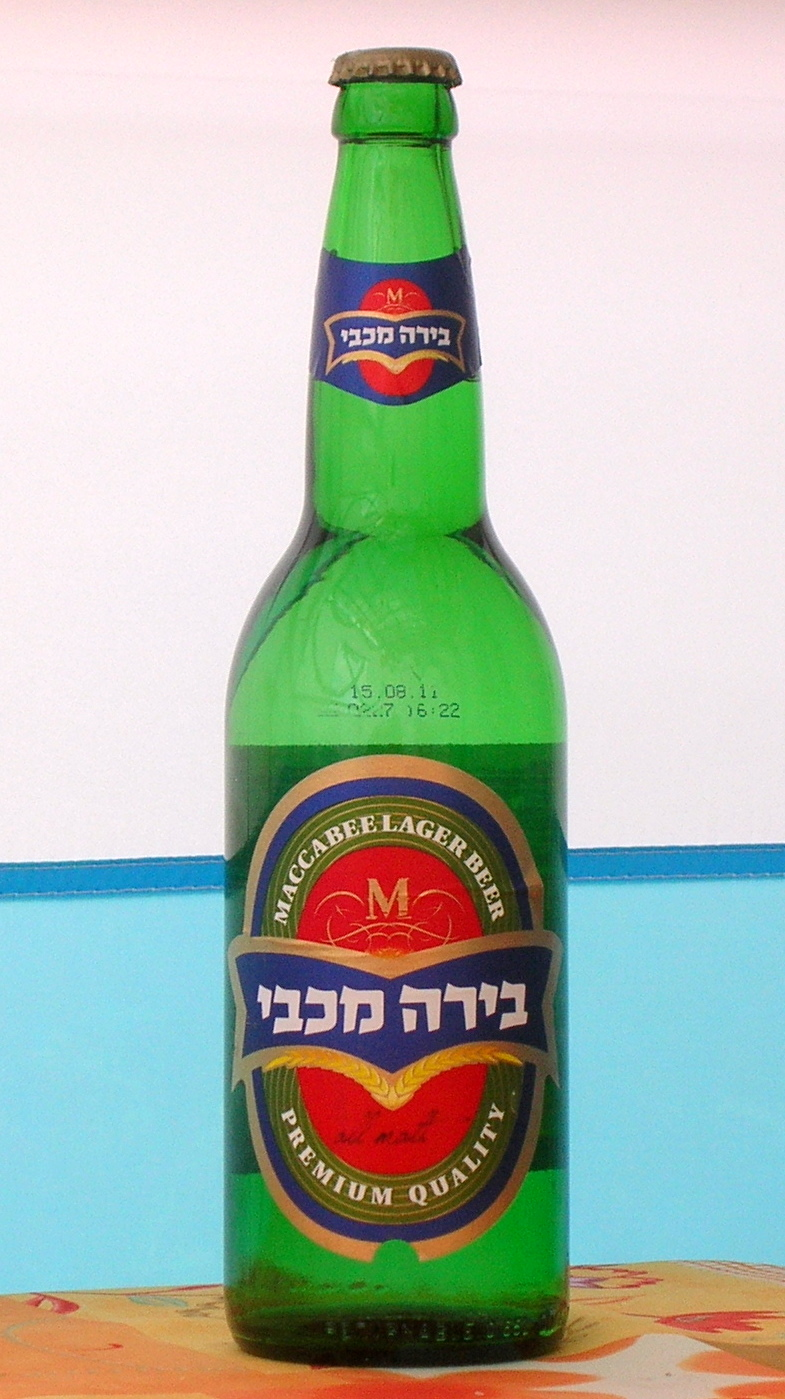
A bottle of Maccabee beer.

Since 1992, Tempo has been an importer of Heineken lager, and in 2005 they became the sole distributor in Israel for Samuel Adams lager. Heineken International owns a 40% share of Tempo, which has its main office in Netanya.

== Barkan Wine Cellars ==
In September 2004, Tempo acquired a 39% controlling interest in Barkan Wine Cellars, which is Israel's second-largest winery. Barkan produces the Segal brand of wine.

== Popular culture ==
- Goldstar beer was referred to in the song "Tel Aviv" by Duran Duran in their 1981 album Duran Duran.
- For some reason, at many American Reform Jewish summer camps an old Tempo commercial jingle is often sung. Tempo was once one of Israel's largest soft drink brands, with a line of drinks called Tempo Kan-Kan (טמפו קן-קן), which featured several flavors, such as orange and cola. Today, Tempo is Pepsi's Israeli bottler.

== See also ==
- Beer in Israel
- Malt beer
