= Givat Haim (Meuhad) =

Kibbutz in central Israel

Givat Haim (Meuhad): גבעת חיים (מאוחד) (Hebrew); جفعات حاييم (مئوحاد) (Arabic)
- Location within Central Israel Location within Israel
- Coordinates: 32°23′31″N 34°55′48″E
- Country: Israel
- District: Central
- Subdistrict: HaSharon
- Council: Hefer Valley
- Affiliation: Kibbutz Movement
- Founded: 1932
- Founder: Mapam supporters from Givat Haim
- Population (2024): 1,264

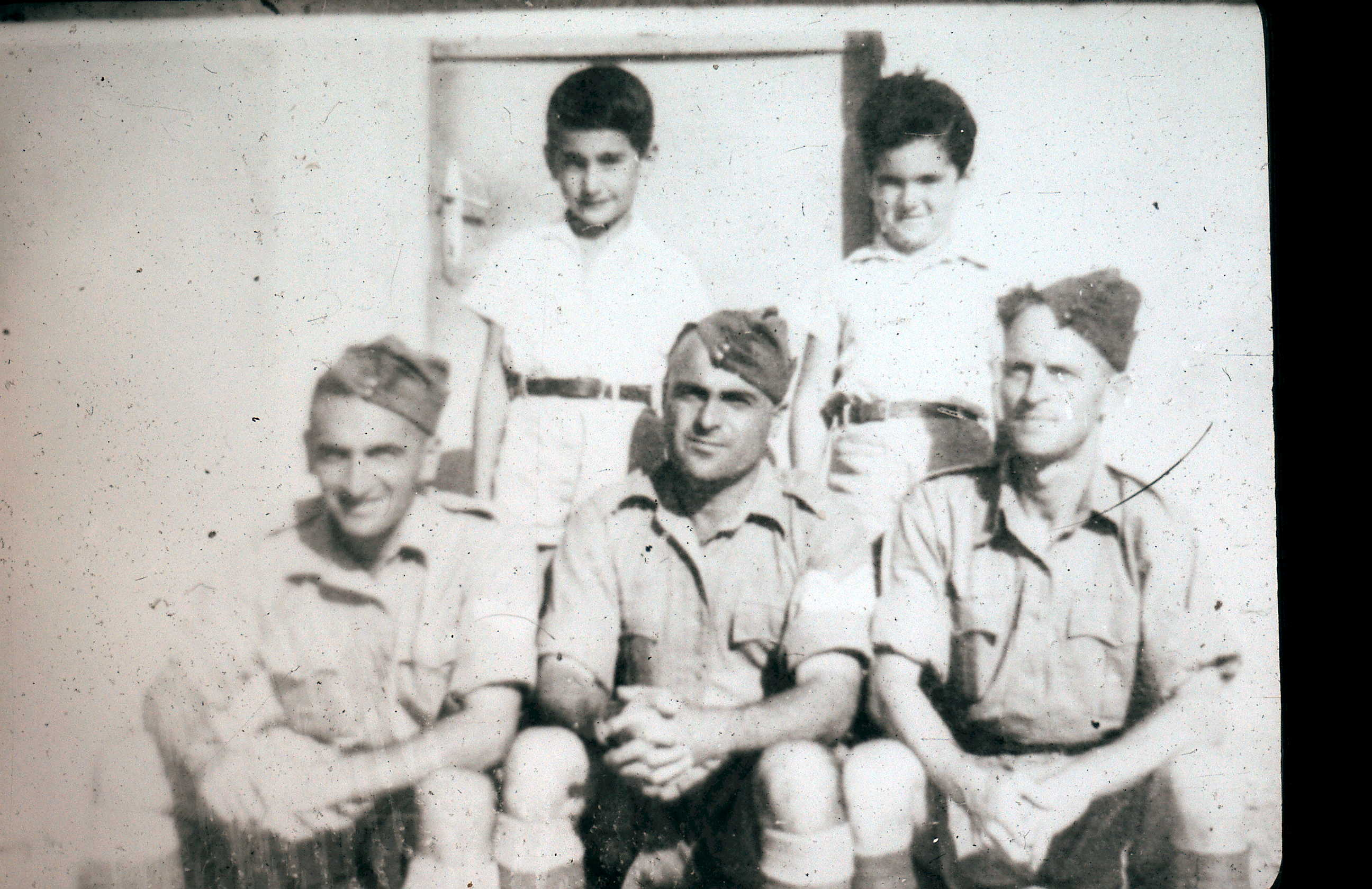
Yitzhak ben Aharon and other members of Kibbutz Givat Haim Meuchad, as British soldiers (between 1940 and 1946)

Givat Haim (Meuhad) (Hebrew: גבעת חיים (מאוחד), lit. Haim Hill (United)) is a kibbutz near Hadera in Israel. It falls under the jurisdiction Hefer Valley Regional Council. In 2024 it had a population of 1,264.

== History ==
It was formed in 1952 by an ideological split in kibbutz Givat Haim (founded 1932), with Mapai-supporting members breaking away to create Givat Haim (Ihud), which joined the Mapai-affiliated Ihud HaKvutzot veHaKibbutzim, whilst Mapam-supporting members formed Givat Haim (Meuhad) which joined the HaKibbutz HaMeuhad movement. Today both kibbutzim belong to the Kibbutz Movement.

== Economy ==
As well as agriculture, the kibbutz is home to Prigat, a major soft drink company in Israel.

== Notable people ==
- Yitzhak Ben-Aharon, Minister of Transport and member of the Knesset for Mapam
- Uri Gil
- Uzi Geller
