= Nesher Beer =

Israeli beer and non-alcoholic malt beverages

Nesher
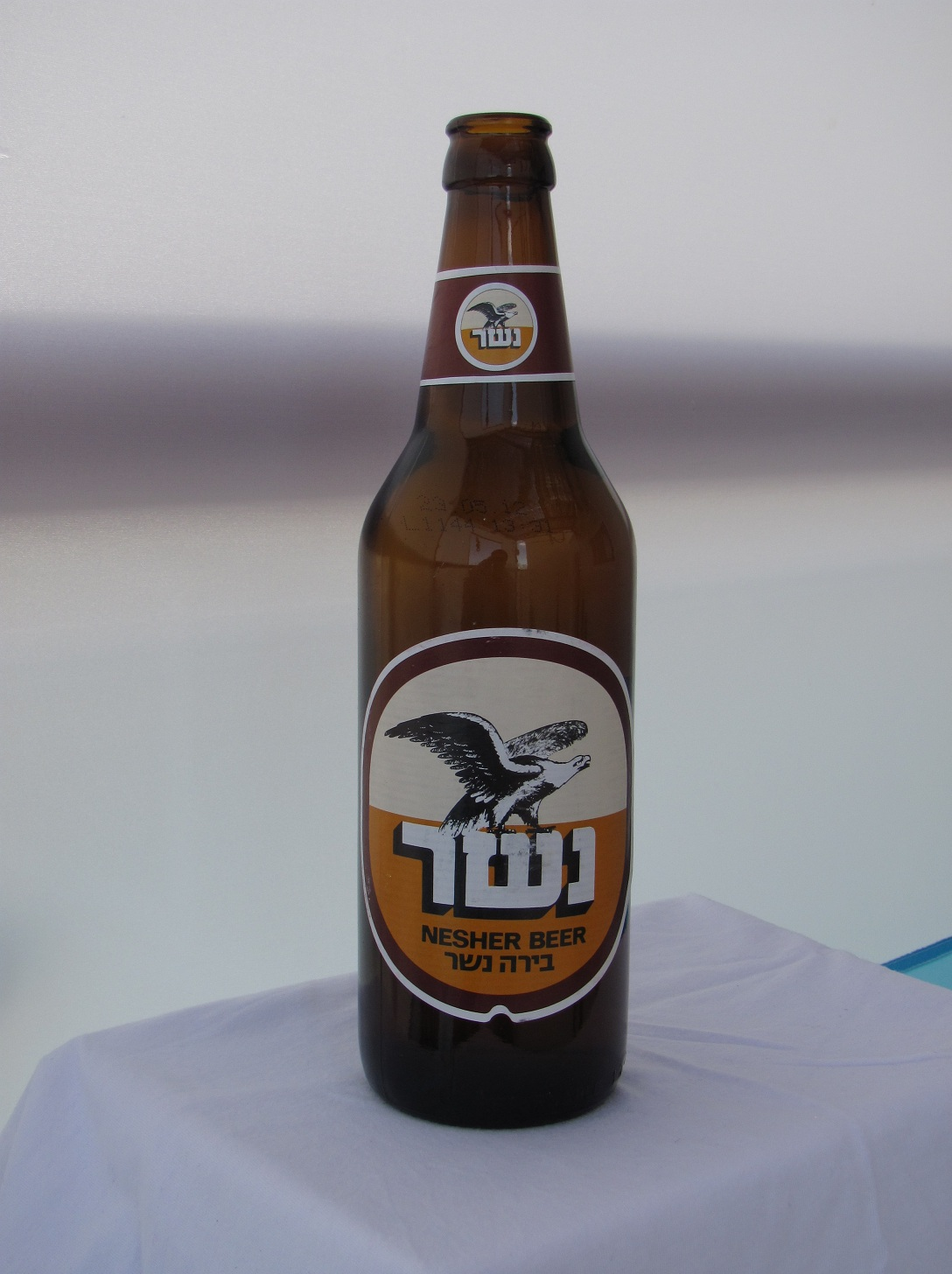
- Type: Nesher Beer: light pale lager Nesher Malt: non-alcoholic malt
- Manufacturer: Tempo
- Origin: Israel
- Introduced: 1934
- Alcohol by volume: White Nesher: 3.8% Nesher Malt: < 0.5%
- Variants: Nesher Beer, Nesher Malt, Nesher Malt Diet
- Website: tempo.co.il/beers/white-nesher/

Nesher Beer (Hebrew: בירה נשר) (Beera Nesher) is a brand of Israeli beer and non-alcoholic malt beverages.

== History ==
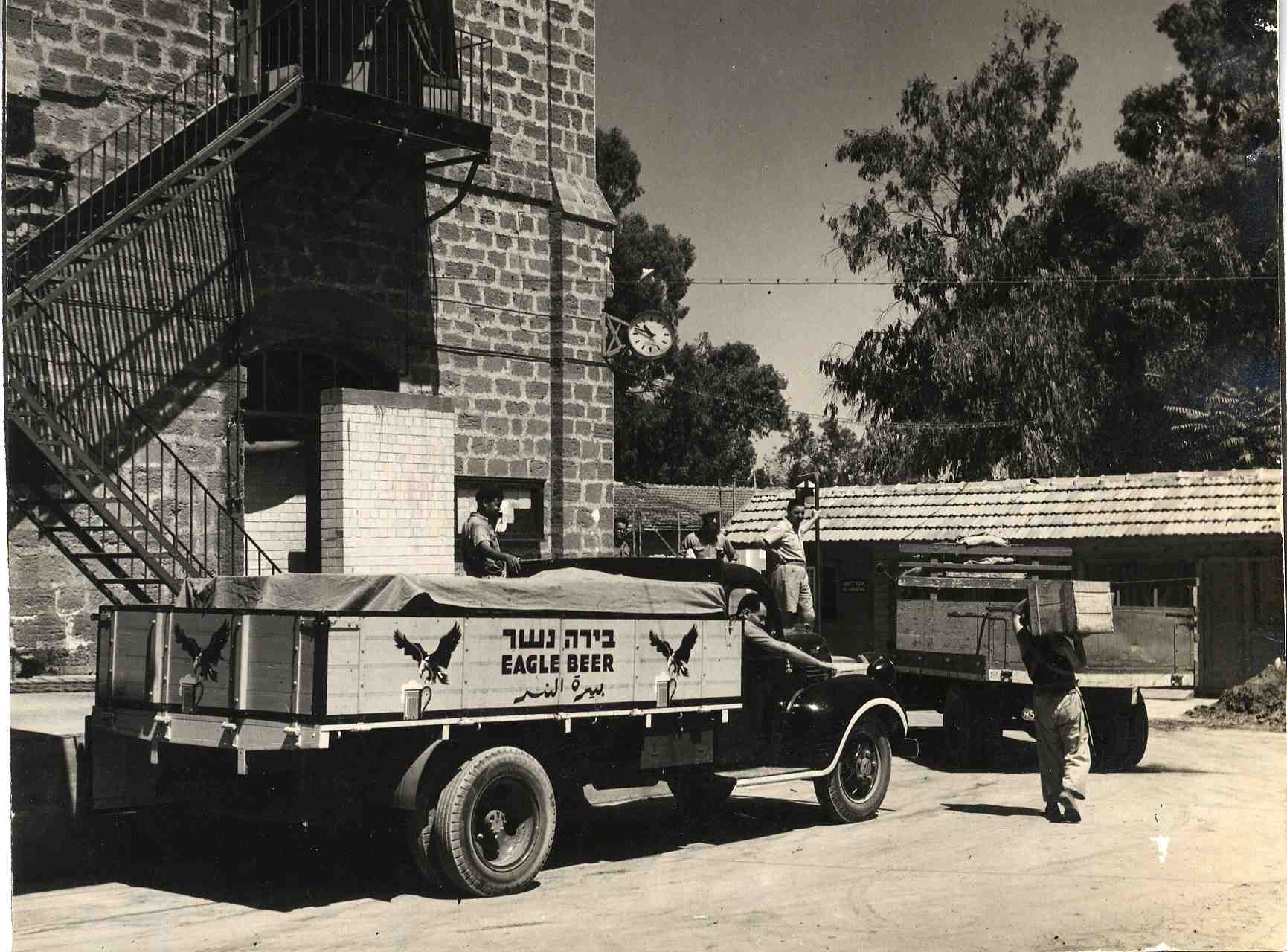
Nesher Beer factory, 1941

Nesher Beer was the country's first industrially brewed beer. It was a joint French-Yishuv venture. Production began in 1935 at the "Palestine Brewery Ltd" in Bat Yam. The distinctive, spread-wing eagle logo, still used today, was selected in a public competition advertised in the Palestine Post (now the Jerusalem Post).

Today Nesher Beer is produced by Tempo Beer Industries in Netanya.

== Beers ==
Nesher Beer is a pale lager beer produced from various grains. It is a light beer, defined as a Schankbier. Nesher Malt (or black beer) is non-alcoholic. It has a sweet taste and is sold in glass bottles of 330 ml or 500 ml and in 1.5 liter plastic bottles.

== See also ==
- Beer in Israel
